= 2018 Internazionali di Tennis Città dell'Aquila – Doubles =

Doubles
- 2018 Internazionali di Tennis Città dell'Aquila

Final
- Champions: (Italy) Filippo Baldi (Italy) Andrea Pellegrino
- Runners-up: (Spain) Pedro Martínez (Netherlands) Mark Vervoort
- Score: 4–6, 6–3, [10–5]

Events
Singles	Doubles
← 2017 ·	Internazionali di Tennis Città dell'Aquila	· 2019 →

Steven de Waard and Ben McLachlan were the defending champions but chose not to defend their title.

Filippo Baldi and Andrea Pellegrino won the title after defeating Pedro Martínez and Mark Vervoort 4–6, 6–3, [10–5] in the final.

== Seeds ==
1. (Argentina) Facundo Bagnis / (Uruguay) Ariel Behar (quarterfinals)
2. (Philippines) Ruben Gonzales / (United States) Nathaniel Lammons (first round)
3. (Italy) Julian Ocleppo / (Italy) Andrea Vavassori (semifinals)
4. (Ecuador) Roberto Quiroz / (Mexico) Manuel Sánchez (withdrew)

== Draw ==
=== Key ===
- Q = Qualifier
- WC = Wild card
- LL = Lucky loser
- Alt = Alternate
- SE = Special exempt
- PR = Protected ranking
- ITF = ITF entry
- JE = Junior exempt
- w/o = Walkover
- r = Retired
- d = Defaulted
- SR = Special ranking

First round
1	(Argentina) F Bagnis (Uruguay) A Behar	6^{4}	7^{7}	[10]
PR	(Italy) A Arnaboldi (Italy) D Bracciali	7^{7}	6^{5}	[6]
(Spain) Carlos Boluda-Purkiss (Spain) B Zapata Miralles	4	2
(Brazil) D Dutra da Silva (Brazil) R Dutra Silva	6	6
Alt	(Argentina) H Casanova (China) Zh Zhang	4	4
WC	(Italy) F Baldi (Italy) A Pellegrino	6	6
WC	(Italy) Riccardo Balzerani (Italy) G Fonio	3	6	[6]
(Brazil) G Clezar (Colombia) A González	6	4	[10]
(Bolivia) B Arias (Bolivia) H Dellien	6^{4}	6	[10]
Alt	(Italy) M Bortolotti (Italy) W Trusendi	7^{7}	2	[8]
WC	(Italy) Alessio De Bernardis (Italy) Giorgio Portaluri	6	0	[3]
3	(Italy) J Ocleppo (Italy) A Vavassori	4	6	[10]
(Brazil) T Monteiro (Brazil) J Souza	4	2
(Spain) P Martínez (Netherlands) M Vervoort	6	6
(Uruguay) M Cuevas (Italy) A Motti	1	6	[11]
2	(Philippines) R Gonzales (United States) N Lammons	6	3	[9]

Quarterfinals
1	(Argentina) F Bagnis (Uruguay) A Behar	2	7^{7}	[9]
(Brazil) D Dutra da Silva (Brazil) R Dutra Silva	6	6^{5}	[11]
WC	(Italy) F Baldi (Italy) A Pellegrino	w/o
(Brazil) G Clezar (Colombia) A González
(Bolivia) B Arias (Bolivia) H Dellien	6^{2}	6^{6}
3	(Italy) J Ocleppo (Italy) A Vavassori	7^{7}	7^{8}
(Spain) P Martínez (Netherlands) M Vervoort	6	6
(Uruguay) M Cuevas (Italy) A Motti	4	3

Semifinals
(Brazil) D Dutra da Silva (Brazil) R Dutra Silva
WC	(Italy) F Baldi (Italy) A Pellegrino	w/o
3	(Italy) J Ocleppo (Italy) A Vavassori	4	6	[6]
(Spain) P Martínez (Netherlands) M Vervoort	6	3	[10]

Final
WC	(Italy) F Baldi (Italy) A Pellegrino	4	6	[10]
(Spain) P Martínez (Netherlands) M Vervoort	6	3	[5]
