= 2023 Internazionali di Tennis Città di Todi – Singles =

Singles
- 2023 Internazionali di Tennis Città di Todi

Final
- Champion: (Italy) Luciano Darderi
- Runner-up: (France) Clément Tabur
- Score: 6–4, 6–7^{(5–7)}, 6–1

Events
Singles	Doubles
← 2022 ·	Internazionali di Tennis Città di Todi	· 2024 →

Pedro Cachin was the defending champion but chose not to defend his title.

Luciano Darderi won the title after defeating Clément Tabur 6–4, 6–7^{(5–7)}, 6–1 in the final.

== Seeds ==
1. (Hungary) Zsombor Piros (second round)
2. (Argentina) Camilo Ugo Carabelli (withdrew)
3. (Argentina) Mariano Navone (first round)
4. (Croatia) Duje Ajduković (second round)
5. (Italy) Andrea Pellegrino (first round)
6. (Argentina) Román Andrés Burruchaga (first round)
7. (Italy) Luciano Darderi (champion)
8. (Italy) Francesco Maestrelli (semifinals)

== Draw ==
=== Key ===
- Q = Qualifier
- WC = Wild card
- LL = Lucky loser
- Alt = Alternate
- SE = Special exempt
- PR = Protected ranking
- ITF = ITF entry
- JE = Junior exempt
- w/o = Walkover
- r = Retired
- d = Defaulted
- SR = Special ranking

=== Finals ===
Semifinals
(France) Clément Tabur	7	4	6
(Italy) Giovanni Fonio	5	6	3
7	(Italy) Luciano Darderi	7^{9}	6
8	(Italy) Francesco Maestrelli	6^{7}	4

Final
(France) Clément Tabur	4	7^{7}	1
7	(Italy) Luciano Darderi	6	6^{5}	6

=== Top half ===
First round
1	(Hungary) Z Piros	6	6
(Poland) D Michalski	2	4
(Italy) S Caruso	6	2	0
(France) C Tabur	4	6	6
(Belgium) M Geerts	5	6	7
Q	(Italy) G Oradini	7	3	5
(Tunisia) M Echargui	6	6
5	(Italy) A Pellegrino	3	1
3	(Argentina) M Navone	6^{4}	3
WC	(Italy) E Dalla Valle	7^{7}	6
Q	(United Kingdom) F Gill	7^{10}	4	7^{7}
(Italy) F Forti	6^{8}	6	6^{2}
(Italy) G Fonio	7^{7}	6
Q	(Brazil) O Luz	6^{4}	4
Q	(Italy) J Ocleppo	6	6
6	(Argentina) RA Burruchaga	3	4

Second round
1	(Hungary) Z Piros	0	1
(France) C Tabur	6	6
(Belgium) M Geerts	2	1
(Tunisia) M Echargui	6	6
WC	(Italy) E Dalla Valle	7	4	4
Q	(United Kingdom) F Gill	5	6	6
(Italy) G Fonio	6	6^{5}	6
Q	(Italy) J Ocleppo	3	7^{7}	4

Quarterfinals
(France) C Tabur	6	3	7^{9}
(Tunisia) M Echargui	4	6	6^{7}
Q	(United Kingdom) F Gill	3	4
(Italy) G Fonio	6	6

Semifinals
(France) C Tabur	7	4	6
(Italy) G Fonio	5	6	3

=== Bottom half ===
First round
7	(Italy) L Darderi	6	6
Alt	(Germany) Lucas Gerch	2	3
Q	(Serbia) M Zekić	6^{1}	6	6
Alt	(Spain) Carlos López Montagud	7^{7}	3	4
Q	(Spain) C Sánchez Jover	7^{7}	6
WC	(Italy) Fabrizio Andaloro	6^{3}	2
(Spain) J Barranco Cosano	3	4
4	(Croatia) D Ajduković	6	6
8	(Italy) F Maestrelli	6	6
WC	(Italy) Giorgio Tabacco	1	4
(Croatia) N Serdarušić	6	7^{8}
(Spain) O Roca Batalla	3	6^{6}
(France) G Debru	6	7^{7}
(Germany) H Squire	3	6^{3}
(Italy) L Giustino	6^{4}	0
LL	(France) Mathys Erhard	7^{7}	6

Second round
7	(Italy) L Darderi	6	6
Q	(Serbia) M Zekić	4	4
Q	(Spain) C Sánchez Jover	6	7
4	(Croatia) D Ajduković	3	5
8	(Italy) F Maestrelli	6	6^{4}	6
(Croatia) N Serdarušić	2	7^{7}	2
(France) G Debru	6	2	6
LL	(France) M Erhard	4	6	4

Quarterfinals
7	(Italy) L Darderi	6	6
Q	(Spain) C Sánchez Jover	0	1
8	(Italy) F Maestrelli	7^{7}	6
(France) G Debru	6^{4}	4

Semifinals
7	(Italy) L Darderi	7^{9}	6
8	(Italy) F Maestrelli	6^{7}	4
