= 2014 Distal & ITR Group Tennis Cup – Singles =

Singles
- 2014 Distal & ITR Group Tennis Cup and the Astra Italy Tennis Cup

Final
- Champion: (Slovenia) Aljaž Bedene
- Runner-up: (Hungary) Márton Fucsovics
- Score: 2–6, 7–6^{(7–4)}, 6–4

Events
Singles	men	women
Doubles	men	women
← 2013 ·	Distal & ITR Group Tennis Cup	· 2015 →
← 2013 ·	Astra Italy Tennis Cup	· 2015 →

Pere Riba was the defending champion but did not participate.

Aljaž Bedene won the title, defeating Márton Fucsovics in the final, 2–6, 7–6^{(7–4)}, 6–4.

== Seeds ==
1. (Austria) Andreas Haider-Maurer (semifinals)
2. (Argentina) Máximo González (quarterfinals)
3. (Italy) Filippo Volandri (second round)
4. (Slovakia) Norbert Gomboš (quarterfinals)
5. (Slovenia) Aljaž Bedene (champion)
6. (Slovakia) Andrej Martin (second round)
7. (Italy) Thomas Fabbiano (first round)
8. (Italy) Andrea Arnaboldi (second round)

== Draw ==
=== Key ===
- Q = Qualifier
- WC = Wild card
- LL = Lucky loser
- Alt = Alternate
- SE = Special exempt
- PR = Protected ranking
- ITF = ITF entry
- JE = Junior exempt
- w/o = Walkover
- r = Retired
- d = Defaulted
- SR = Special ranking

=== Finals ===
Semifinals
1	(Austria) Andreas Haider-Maurer	7^{7}	3	5
5	(Slovenia) Aljaž Bedene	6^{5}	6	7
(Hungary) Márton Fucsovics	3	6	6
(Spain) Enrique López-Pérez	6	3	0

Final
5	(Slovenia) Aljaž Bedene	2	7^{7}	6
(Hungary) Márton Fucsovics	6	6^{4}	4

=== Top half ===
First round
1	(Austria) A Haider-Maurer	6	6^{5}	6
Q	(Argentina) R Olivo	0	7^{7}	2
(Chile) H Podlipnik-Castillo	6^{2}	3
(France) L Pouille	7^{7}	6
(Spain) R Ramírez Hidalgo	6	6
(Italy) L Giustino	2	4
Q	(Argentina) G Durán	4	5
8	(Italy) A Arnaboldi	6	1^{r}
3	(Italy) F Volandri	3	7^{6}	6
WC	(Italy) R Marcora	6	6^{5}	4
(Austria) M Fischer	2	6	6
(Spain) R Carballés Baena	6	4	3
(Croatia) T Androić	6	6
(Italy) M Donati	4	3
Alt	(Argentina) A Molteni	7	4	4
5	(Slovenia) A Bedene	6^{4}	6	6

Second round
1	(Austria) A Haider-Maurer	6	6
(France) L Pouille	2	3
(Spain) R Ramírez Hidalgo	6	6
(Argentina) G Durán	1	1
3	(Italy) F Volandri	7^{7}	6^{2}	3
(Austria) M Fischer	6^{2}	7^{7}	6
(Croatia) T Androić	6	4	4
5	(Slovenia) A Bedene	4	6	6

Quarterfinals
1	(Austria) A Haider-Maurer	6	7
(Spain) R Ramírez Hidalgo	3	5
(Austria) M Fischer	3	3
5	(Slovenia) A Bedene	6	6

Semifinals
1	(Austria) A Haider-Maurer	7^{7}	3	5
5	(Slovenia) A Bedene	6^{5}	6	7

=== Bottom half ===
First round
6	(Slovakia) A Martin	6	6
(France) A Michon	3	1
WC	(Italy) S Travaglia	5	2
(Hungary) M Fucsovics	6	6
(Japan) T Daniel	6	2	6
(Italy) F Cipolla	3	6	4
(Egypt) M Safwat	6^{4}	2
4	(Slovakia) N Gomboš	7^{7}	6
7	(Italy) T Fabbiano	2	2
Q	(Austria) M Neuchrist	6	6
WC	(Italy) Antonio Massara	0	4
(Spain) E López-Pérez	6	6
(Brazil) G Clezar	4	6	7^{7}
(Switzerland) Y Marti	6	1	^{2}
WC	(Italy) A Giannessi	6^{4}	2
2	(Argentina) M González	7^{7}	6

Second round
6	(Slovakia) A Martin	6	6^{4}	2
(Hungary) M Fucsovics	4	7^{7}	6
(Japan) T Daniel	2	3
4	(Slovakia) N Gomboš	6	6
Q	(Austria) M Neuchrist	7^{7}	6^{6}	3
(Spain) E López-Pérez	6^{5}	7^{8}	6
(Brazil) G Clezar	2	4
2	(Argentina) M González	6	6

Quarterfinals
(Hungary) M Fucsovics	6	6
4	(Slovakia) N Gomboš	4	2
(Spain) E López-Pérez	7	3	6
2	(Argentina) M González	6^{4}	6	1

Semifinals
(Hungary) M Fucsovics	3	6	6
(Spain) E López-Pérez	6	3	0
