= 2014 Distal & ITR Group Tennis Cup – Doubles =

Doubles
- 2014 Distal & ITR Group Tennis Cup and the Astra Italy Tennis Cup

Final
- Champions: (Argentina) Guillermo Durán (Argentina) Máximo González
- Runners-up: (Italy) Riccardo Ghedin (Germany) Claudio Grassi
- Score: 6–1, 3–6, [10–7]

Events
| Singles | men | women |
| Doubles | men | women |
| ← 2013 · | Distal & ITR Group Tennis Cup | · 2015 → |
| ← 2013 · | Astra Italy Tennis Cup | · 2015 → |

Santiago Giraldo and Cristian Rodríguez were the defending champion but Giraldo did not participate that year. Rodríguez played alongside Enrico Fioravante and they lost in the First Round.

Guillermo Durán and Máximo González won the title, defeating Riccardo Ghedin and Claudio Grassi in the final, 6–1, 3–6, [10–7].

== Seeds ==
1. (Argentina) Guillermo Durán / (Argentina) Máximo González (champions)
2. (Italy) Riccardo Ghedin / (Germany) Claudio Grassi (final)
3. (Netherlands) Stephan Fransen / (Netherlands) Wesley Koolhof (quarterfinals)
4. (Venezuela) Roberto Maytín / (Argentina) Andrés Molteni (semifinals)

== Draw ==
=== Key ===
- Q = Qualifier
- WC = Wild card
- LL = Lucky loser
- Alt = Alternate
- SE = Special exempt
- PR = Protected ranking
- ITF = ITF entry
- JE = Junior exempt
- w/o = Walkover
- r = Retired
- d = Defaulted
- SR = Special ranking

=== Draw ===
First round
1 | (Argentina) G Durán (Argentina) M González | 6 | 7^{7}
(Uruguay) A Behar (United States) V Mirzadeh | 4 | 6^{2}
WC | (Italy) Lorenzo Santini (Italy) Lorenzo Trapani | 1 | 2
(Slovakia) N Gomboš (Slovakia) A Martin | 6 | 6
3 | (Netherlands) S Fransen (Netherlands) W Koolhof | 3 | 6 | [10]
(Philippines) R Gonzales (United Kingdom) S Thornley | 6 | 1 | [8]
WC | (Italy) Enrico Fioravante (Colombia) C Rodríguez | 7^{7} | 4 | [6]
(Italy) A Giannessi (Italy) A Motti | 6^{2} | 6 | [10]
(Brazil) G Clezar (Peru) S Galdós | 3 | 6^{2}
(France) A Michon (France) L Pouille | 6 | 7^{7}
(Austria) S Bader (Austria) A Haider-Maurer | 5 | 4
4 | (Venezuela) R Maytín (Argentina) A Molteni | 7 | 6
(Argentina) Facundo Alvo (Italy) M Fioroni | 1 | 3
(Austria) M Neuchrist (Egypt) M Safwat | 6 | 6
(Slovenia) A Bedene (Argentina) R Olivo | 1 | 7^{9} | [6]
2 | (Italy) R Ghedin (Germany) G Grassi | 6 | 6^{7} | [10]

Quarterfinals
1 | (Argentina) G Durán (Argentina) M González | 3 | 6 | [11]
(Slovakia) N Gomboš (Slovakia) A Martin | 6 | 3 | [9]
3 | (Netherlands) S Fransen (Netherlands) W Koolhof | 6^{3} | 6^{2}
(Italy) A Giannessi (Italy) A Motti | 7^{7} | 7^{7}
(France) A Michon (France) L Pouille | 4 | 7 | [4]
4 | (Venezuela) R Maytín (Argentina) A Molteni | 6 | 5 | [10]
(Austria) M Neuchrist (Egypt) M Safwat | 4 | 1
2 | (Italy) R Ghedin (Germany) G Grassi | 6 | 6

Semifinals
1 | (Argentina) G Durán (Argentina) M González | 7^{9} | 5 | [11]
(Italy) A Giannessi (Italy) A Motti | 6^{7} | 7 | [9]
4 | (Venezuela) R Maytín (Argentina) A Molteni | 6^{1} | 6^{5}
2 | (Italy) R Ghedin (Germany) G Grassi | 7^{7} | 7^{7}

Final
1 | (Argentina) G Durán (Argentina) M González | 6 | 3 | [10]
2 | (Italy) R Ghedin (Germany) G Grassi | 1 | 6 | [7]
