= 2015 Distal & ITR Group Tennis Cup – Doubles =

Doubles
- 2015 Distal & ITR Group Tennis Cup

Final
- Champion: (Italy) Flavio Cipolla (Argentina) Máximo González
- Runner-up: (Germany) Andreas Beck (Germany) Peter Gojowczyk
- Score: 6–4, 6–1

Events
Singles	Doubles
← 2014 ·	Internazionali di Tennis dell'Umbria	· 2016 →

Guillermo Durán and Máximo González were the defending champions, but Durán did not participate this year. González defended his title alongside Flavio Cipolla, beating Andreas Beck and Peter Gojowczyk 6–4, 6–1.

== Seeds ==
1. (Italy) Flavio Cipolla / (Argentina) Máximo González (champions)
2. (Mexico) César Ramírez / (Mexico) Miguel Ángel Reyes-Varela (quarterfinals)
3. (United States) James Cerretani / (Romania) Costin Pavăl (semifinals)
4. (Philippines) Ruben Gonzales / (South Africa) Ruan Roelofse (first round)

== Draw ==
=== Key ===
- Q = Qualifier
- WC = Wild card
- LL = Lucky loser
- Alt = Alternate
- SE = Special exempt
- PR = Protected ranking
- ITF = ITF entry
- JE = Junior exempt
- w/o = Walkover
- r = Retired
- d = Defaulted
- SR = Special ranking

First round
1	(Italy) F Cipolla (Argentina) M González	7	6
(Romania) P Grigoriu (Serbia) Ilija Vučić	5	2
(Croatia) D Marcan (Slovenia) B Rola	6^{5}	4
WC	(Italy) Omar Giacalone (Italy) S Napolitano	7^{7}	6
3	(United States) J Cerretani (Romania) C Pavăl	4	6	[10]
(Argentina) A Collarini (Peru) S Galdós	6	4	[8]
WC	(Italy) S Caruso (Italy) F Gaio	1	4
(Slovakia) A Martin (Austria) G Melzer	6	6
(France) M Bourque (France) L Pouille	6	1	[7]
(Argentina) N Kicker (Sweden) C Lindell	4	6	[10]
(Italy) A Motti (France) S Robert	6	6
4	(Philippines) R Gonzales (South Africa) R Roelofse	4	4
(Germany) A Beck (Germany) P Gojowczyk	1	6	[10]
(Belgium) N Desein (Belgium) G Gigounon	6	3	[5]
WC	(United States) Sam Barnett (United States) K Kim	0	3
2	(Mexico) C Ramírez (Mexico) MÁ Reyes-Varela	6	6

Quarterfinals
1	(Italy) F Cipolla (Argentina) M González	6	6^{4}	[10]
WC	(Italy) O Giacalone (Italy) S Napolitano	3	7^{7}	[6]
3	(United States) J Cerretani (Romania) C Pavăl	7^{7}	2	[10]
(Slovakia) A Martin (Austria) G Melzer	6^{4}	6	[3]
(Argentina) N Kicker (Sweden) C Lindell	6	6
(Italy) A Motti (France) S Robert	3	4
(Germany) A Beck (Germany) P Gojowczyk	6	6
2	(Mexico) C Ramírez (Mexico) MÁ Reyes-Varela	1	2

Semifinals
1	(Italy) F Cipolla (Argentina) M González	7	7^{8}
3	(United States) J Cerretani (Romania) C Pavăl	5	6^{6}
(Argentina) N Kicker (Sweden) C Lindell	6	4	[7]
(Germany) A Beck (Germany) P Gojowczyk	3	6	[10]

Final
1	(Italy) F Cipolla (Argentina) M González	6	6
(Germany) A Beck (Germany) P Gojowczyk	4	1
