= 2016 Internazionali di Tennis dell'Umbria – Singles =

Singles
- 2016 Internazionali di Tennis dell'Umbria

Final
- Champion: (Serbia) Miljan Zekić
- Runner-up: (Italy) Stefano Napolitano
- Score: 6–7^{(6–8)}, 6–4, 6–3

Events
Singles	Doubles
← 2015 ·	Internazionali di Tennis dell'Umbria	· 2017 →

Aljaž Bedene was the two-time defending champion but chose not to participate.

Miljan Zekić won the title after defeating Stefano Napolitano 6–7^{(6–8)}, 6–4, 6–3 in the final.

== Seeds ==
1. (Slovakia) Andrej Martin (quarterfinals)
2. (Italy) Marco Cecchinato (semifinals)
3. (Argentina) Marco Trungelliti (semifinals)
4. (Hungary) Márton Fucsovics (quarterfinals)
5. (Italy) Alessandro Giannessi (quarterfinals)
6. (Italy) Luca Vanni (quarterfinals)
7. (Argentina) Facundo Argüello (first round)
8. (Turkey) Marsel İlhan (first round)

== Draw ==
=== Key ===
- Q = Qualifier
- WC = Wild card
- LL = Lucky loser
- Alt = Alternate
- SE = Special exempt
- PR = Protected ranking
- ITF = ITF entry
- JE = Junior exempt
- w/o = Walkover
- r = Retired
- d = Defaulted
- SR = Special ranking

=== Finals ===
Semifinals
Q	(Serbia) Miljan Zekić	6	6
3	(Argentina) Marco Trungelliti	2	2
WC	(Italy) Stefano Napolitano	6	6
2	(Italy) Marco Cecchinato	4	2

Final
Q	(Serbia) Miljan Zekić	6^{6}	6	6
WC	(Italy) Stefano Napolitano	7^{8}	4	3

=== Top half ===
First round
1	(Slovakia) A Martin	6	5	6
(France) C Lestienne	3	7	3
(Egypt) M Safwat	6	0	1
WC	(Italy) G Quinzi	3	6	6
(Kazakhstan) D Popko	7	6
(Spain) J Samper-Montaña	5	3
Q	(Serbia) M Zekić	7	6
8	(Turkey) M İlhan	5	1
3	(Argentina) M Trungelliti	6	2	7
Q	(Bosnia and Herzegovina) T Brkić	3	6	5
(Romania) A Ungur	6	3	2
Alt	(Russia) D Medvedev	1	6	6
WC	(Italy) F Gaio	7^{9}	6^{5}	4
(Italy) M Donati	6^{7}	7^{7}	6
(Italy) A Arnaboldi	4	4
6	(Italy) L Vanni	6	6

Second round
1	(Slovakia) A Martin	7	2	6
WC	(Italy) G Quinzi	5	6	1
(Kazakhstan) D Popko	2	4
Q	(Serbia) M Zekić	6	6
3	(Argentina) M Trungelliti	6	7
Alt	(Russia) D Medvedev	2	5
(Italy) M Donati	6	5	4
6	(Italy) L Vanni	0	7	6

Quarterfinals
1	(Slovakia) A Martin	3	6^{7}
Q	(Serbia) M Zekić	6	7^{9}
3	(Argentina) M Trungelliti	6	7^{7}
6	(Italy) L Vanni	3	6^{5}

Semifinals
Q	(Serbia) M Zekić	6	6
3	(Argentina) M Trungelliti	2	2

=== Bottom half ===
First round
7	(Argentina) F Argüello	3	4
WC	(Italy) S Napolitano	6	6
Q	(Italy) S Caruso	3	4
(Slovenia) B Rola	6	6
WC	(Italy) L Sonego	1	6	6
(Spain) D Pérez Sanz	6	3	0
LL	(Turkey) C İlkel	6	6^{1}	1
4	(Hungary) M Fucsovics	2	7^{7}	6
5	(Italy) A Giannessi	5	7	6
(Canada) S Diez	7	5	1
(France) G Barrère	3	7	4
(Belgium) A De Greef	6	5	6
(Spain) E López-Pérez	3	4
Q	(India) R Ramanathan	6	6
(France) M Bourgue	2	3
2	(Italy) M Cecchinato	6	6

Second round
WC	(Italy) S Napolitano	6	6
(Slovenia) B Rola	3	3
WC	(Italy) L Sonego	7^{7}	4	1
4	(Hungary) M Fucsovics	6^{5}	6	6
5	(Italy) A Giannessi	4	6	6
(Belgium) A De Greef	6	0	1
Q	(India) R Ramanathan	6^{6}	4
2	(Italy) M Cecchinato	7^{8}	6

Quarterfinals
WC	(Italy) S Napolitano	6	5	6
4	(Hungary) M Fucsovics	1	7	4
5	(Italy) A Giannessi	4	6	3
2	(Italy) M Cecchinato	6	2	6

Semifinals
WC	(Italy) S Napolitano	6	6
2	(Italy) M Cecchinato	4	2
