= 2018 Internazionali di Tennis Città dell'Aquila – Singles =

Singles
- 2018 Internazionali di Tennis Città dell'Aquila

Final
- Champion: (Argentina) Facundo Bagnis
- Runner-up: (Italy) Paolo Lorenzi
- Score: 2–6, 6–3, 6–4

Events
Singles	Doubles
← 2017 ·	Internazionali di Tennis Città dell'Aquila	· 2019 →

Federico Delbonis was the defending champion but chose not to defend his title.

Facundo Bagnis won the title after defeating Paolo Lorenzi 2–6, 6–3, 6–4 in the final.

== Seeds ==
1. (Spain) Roberto Carballés Baena (second round)
2. (Italy) Paolo Lorenzi (final)
3. (Bolivia) Hugo Dellien (first round)
4. (Brazil) Rogério Dutra Silva (first round)
5. (Brazil) Thiago Monteiro (semifinals)
6. (Argentina) Facundo Bagnis (champion)
7. (Italy) Gianluigi Quinzi (quarterfinals)
8. (Italy) Luca Vanni (second round)

== Draw ==
=== Key ===
- Q = Qualifier
- WC = Wild card
- LL = Lucky loser
- Alt = Alternate
- SE = Special exempt
- PR = Protected ranking
- ITF = ITF entry
- JE = Junior exempt
- w/o = Walkover
- r = Retired
- d = Defaulted
- SR = Special ranking

=== Finals ===
Semifinals
6/Alt	(Argentina) Facundo Bagnis	6	5	7^{7}
(Brazil) Guilherme Clezar	3	7	6^{4}
5	(Brazil) Thiago Monteiro	6^{5}	7^{7}	3
2	(Italy) Paolo Lorenzi	7^{7}	6^{3}	6

Final
6/Alt	(Argentina) Facundo Bagnis	2	6	6
2	(Italy) Paolo Lorenzi	6	3	4

=== Top half ===
First round
1	(Spain) R Carballés Baena	3	7^{7}	7
WC	(Italy) Giovanni Fonio	6	6^{5}	5
WC	(Italy) J Ocleppo	4	2
(Colombia) DE Galán	6	6
(Colombia) A González	3	3
LL	(Italy) G Mager	6	6
WC	(Italy) A Pellegrino	4	7^{7}	2
6/Alt	(Argentina) F Bagnis	6	6^{4}	6
3	(Bolivia) H Dellien	6	6^{5}	6^{4}
(Uruguay) M Cuevas	3	7^{7}	7^{7}
Q	(Italy) R Bonadio	4	5
(Brazil) G Clezar	6	7
Q	(Germany) B Hassan	6^{6}	6	7
Q	(Argentina) A Velotti	7^{8}	2	5
(Ecuador) R Quiroz	2	4
7	(Italy) G Quinzi	6	6

Second round
1	(Spain) R Carballés Baena	5	3
(Colombia) DE Galán	7	6
LL	(Italy) G Mager	4	4
6/Alt	(Argentina) F Bagnis	6	6
(Uruguay) M Cuevas	3	6	2
(Brazil) G Clezar	6	1	6
Q	(Germany) B Hassan	3	4
7	(Italy) G Quinzi	6	6

Quarterfinals
(Colombia) DE Galán	6^{5}	0
6/Alt	(Argentina) F Bagnis	7^{7}	6
(Brazil) G Clezar	6	1	7^{12}
7	(Italy) G Quinzi	3	6	6^{10}

Semifinals
6/Alt	(Argentina) F Bagnis	6	5	7^{7}
(Brazil) G Clezar	3	7	6^{4}

=== Bottom half ===
First round
5	(Brazil) T Monteiro	6	6
(Argentina) H Casanova	3	2
(Argentina) R Olivo	3	4
(Spain) B Zapata Miralles	6	6
(Italy) GM Moroni	6	6
(Italy) A Arnaboldi	4	0
(Spain) P Martínez	5	7^{7}	6
4	(Brazil) R Dutra Silva	7	6^{3}	4
8	(Italy) L Vanni	6	4	6
(Germany) J Choinski	3	6	2
(Argentina) A Collarini	6^{5}	1^{r}
Alt	(Italy) F Baldi	7^{7}	2
Q	(Germany) J Härteis	6	2	4
WC	(Italy) Riccardo Balzerani	4	6	6
(Spain) Carlos Boluda-Purkiss	5	6	4
2	(Italy) P Lorenzi	7	3	6

Second round
5	(Brazil) T Monteiro	6	6
(Spain) B Zapata Miralles	4	1
(Italy) GM Moroni	6	7
(Spain) P Martínez	2	5
8	(Italy) L Vanni	3	4
Alt	(Italy) F Baldi	6	6
WC	(Italy) R Balzerani	4	4
2	(Italy) P Lorenzi	6	6

Quarterfinals
5	(Brazil) T Monteiro	3
(Italy) GM Moroni	1^{r}
Alt	(Italy) F Baldi	4	6^{3}
2	(Italy) P Lorenzi	6	7^{7}

Semifinals
5	(Brazil) T Monteiro	6^{5}	7^{7}	3
2	(Italy) P Lorenzi	7^{7}	6^{3}	6
