= 2016 Internazionali di Tennis dell'Umbria – Doubles =

Doubles
- 2016 Internazionali di Tennis dell'Umbria

Final
- Champions: (Brazil) Marcelo Demoliner (Brazil) Fabrício Neis
- Runners-up: (Italy) Salvatore Caruso (Italy) Alessandro Giannessi
- Score: 6–1, 3–6, [10–5]

Events
Singles	Doubles
← 2015 ·	Internazionali di Tennis dell'Umbria	· 2017 →

Flavio Cipolla and Máximo González were the defending champions but chose not to defend their title.

Marcelo Demoliner and Fabrício Neis won the title after defeating Salvatore Caruso and Alessandro Giannessi 6–1, 3–6, [10–5] in the final.

== Seeds ==
1. (Brazil) Marcelo Demoliner / (Brazil) Fabrício Neis (champions)
2. (Argentina) Facundo Argüello / (Peru) Sergio Galdós (first round)
3. (Uruguay) Ariel Behar / (Spain) Enrique López-Pérez (first round)
4. (Italy) Alessandro Motti / (Chinese Taipei) Peng Hsien-yin (quarterfinals)

== Draw ==
=== Key ===
- Q = Qualifier
- WC = Wild card
- LL = Lucky loser
- Alt = Alternate
- SE = Special exempt
- PR = Protected ranking
- ITF = ITF entry
- JE = Junior exempt
- w/o = Walkover
- r = Retired
- d = Defaulted
- SR = Special ranking

First round
1	(Brazil) M Demoliner (Brazil) F Neis	6	6
(Russia) D Medvedev (Kazakhstan) D Popko	3	3
(Italy) R Ghedin (India) R Ramanathan	7^{7}	6
(Canada) S Diez (Spain) D Pérez Sanz	6^{1}	1
4	(Italy) A Motti (Chinese Taipei) H-y Peng	7^{7}	4	[10]
(France) G Barrère (France) M Bourgue	6^{2}	6	[6]
(Hungary) M Fucsovics (Slovakia) A Martin	6	6
WC	(Austria) L Miedler (Italy) G Quinzi	4	3
WC	(Turkey) T Altuna (Turkey) C İlkel	1	5
(Belgium) S Gillé (Belgium) J Vliegen	6	7
(Slovenia) B Rola (Serbia) M Zekić	7	6
3	(Uruguay) A Behar (Spain) E López-Pérez	5	3
WC	(Italy) M Bortolotti (Italy) S Napolitano	5	6	[12]
(Belgium) A De Greef (Switzerland) L Margaroli	7	1	[14]
(Italy) S Caruso (Italy) A Giannessi	6	6
2	(Argentina) F Argüello (Peru) S Galdós	4	4

Quarterfinals
1	(Brazil) M Demoliner (Brazil) F Neis	6^{4}	7^{16}	[10]
(Italy) R Ghedin (India) R Ramanathan	7^{7}	6^{14}	[7]
4	(Italy) A Motti (Chinese Taipei) H-y Peng	7^{7}	1	[6]
(Hungary) M Fucsovics (Slovakia) A Martin	6^{1}	6	[10]
(Belgium) S Gillé (Belgium) J Vliegen	4	6^{5}
(Slovenia) B Rola (Serbia) M Zekić	6	7^{7}
(Belgium) A De Greef (Switzerland) L Margaroli	6^{4}	6	[7]
(Italy) S Caruso (Italy) A Giannessi	7^{7}	3	[10]

Semifinals
1	(Brazil) M Demoliner (Brazil) F Neis	7	6
(Hungary) M Fucsovics (Slovakia) A Martin	5	2
(Slovenia) B Rola (Serbia) M Zekić	3	7^{7}	[10]
(Italy) S Caruso (Italy) A Giannessi	6	6^{4}	[12]

Final
1	(Brazil) M Demoliner (Brazil) F Neis	6	3	[10]
(Italy) S Caruso (Italy) A Giannessi	1	6	[5]
