= 2022 Internazionali di Tennis Città di Todi – Doubles =

Doubles
- 2022 Internazionali di Tennis Città di Todi

Final
- Champions: (Argentina) Guido Andreozzi (Argentina) Guillermo Durán
- Runners-up: (Monaco) Romain Arneodo (France) Jonathan Eysseric
- Score: 6–1, 2–6, [10–6]

Events
Singles	Doubles
← 2021 ·	Internazionali di Tennis Città di Todi	· 2023 →

Francesco Forti and Giulio Zeppieri were the defending champions but chose not to defend their title.

Guido Andreozzi and Guillermo Durán won the title after defeating Romain Arneodo and Jonathan Eysseric 6–1, 2–6, [10–6] in the final.

== Seeds ==
1. (Monaco) Romain Arneodo / (France) Jonathan Eysseric (final)
2. (Greece) Markos Kalovelonis / (Ukraine) Vladyslav Manafov (first round)
3. (Argentina) Guido Andreozzi / (Argentina) Guillermo Durán (champions)
4. (Italy) Luciano Darderi / (Argentina) Juan Bautista Torres (withdrew)

== Draw ==
=== Key ===
- Q = Qualifier
- WC = Wild card
- LL = Lucky loser
- Alt = Alternate
- SE = Special exempt
- PR = Protected ranking
- ITF = ITF entry
- JE = Junior exempt
- w/o = Walkover
- r = Retired
- d = Defaulted
- SR = Special ranking

First round
1	(Monaco) R Arneodo (France) J Eysseric	6	5	[10]
(Croatia) Z Babić (Croatia) N Serdarušić	2	7	[8]
(Italy) G Fonio (Italy) M Gigante	6	6
WC	(Spain) D Marrero (United States) Dhruva Mulye	3	1
Alt	(Italy) M Arnaldi (Italy) A Motti	6	3	[5]
Andrey Chepelev (Romania) A Jecan	4	6	[10]
(France) T Arribagé (France) L Sanchez	6	6
(Kazakhstan) G Lomakin (Ukraine) O Prihodko	3	4
(Moldova) A Cozbinov (France) E Furness	5	6	[5]
(Brazil) P Boscardin Dias (Brazil) D Dutra da Silva	7	3	[10]
WC	(Italy) Alessio De Bernardis (Italy) F Passaro	4	2
3	(Argentina) G Andreozzi (Argentina) G Durán	6	6
(Argentina) A Collarini (Argentina) N Kicker	6	6^{7}	[11]
(Germany) D Masur (Kazakhstan) D Popko	1	7^{9}	[9]
(Kazakhstan) T Skatov (Argentina) TA Tirante	6	2	[10]
2	(Greece) M Kalovelonis (Ukraine) V Manafov	4	6	[5]

Quarterfinals
1	(Monaco) R Arneodo (France) J Eysseric	w/o
(Italy) G Fonio (Italy) M Gigante
A Chepelev (Romania) A Jecan	6^{2}	6^{1}
(France) T Arribagé (France) L Sanchez	7^{7}	7^{7}
(Brazil) P Boscardin Dias (Brazil) D Dutra da Silva	3	4
3	(Argentina) G Andreozzi (Argentina) G Durán	6	6
(Argentina) A Collarini (Argentina) N Kicker	6	6
(Kazakhstan) T Skatov (Argentina) TA Tirante	3	3

Semifinals
1	(Monaco) R Arneodo (France) J Eysseric	7	7
(France) T Arribagé (France) L Sanchez	5	5
3	(Argentina) G Andreozzi (Argentina) G Durán	7	6
(Argentina) A Collarini (Argentina) N Kicker	5	4

Final
1	(Monaco) R Arneodo (France) J Eysseric	1	6	[6]
3	(Argentina) G Andreozzi (Argentina) G Durán	6	2	[10]
