= 2015 Distal & ITR Group Tennis Cup – Singles =

Singles
- 2015 Distal & ITR Group Tennis Cup

Final
- Champion: (United Kingdom) Aljaž Bedene
- Runner-up: (Argentina) Nicolás Kicker
- Score: 7–6^{(7–3)}, 6–4

Events
Singles	Doubles
← 2014 ·	Internazionali di Tennis dell'Umbria	· 2016 →

Aljaž Bedene was the defending champion, and retained his title after defeat Nicolás Kicker 7–6^{(7–3)}, 6–4.

Stefano Napolitano defeated Augusto Virgili in the qualifying 6–0, 6–3, winning the first set without dropping a single point, so called golden set.

== Seeds ==
1. (United Kingdom) Aljaž Bedene (champion)
2. (Serbia) Dušan Lajović (first round)
3. (Slovenia) Blaž Rola (first round)
4. (France) Lucas Pouille (second round)
5. (Belgium) Kimmer Coppejans (first round)
6. (Colombia) Alejandro González (quarterfinals)
7. (Italy) Luca Vanni (first round)
8. (Argentina) Máximo González (first round)

== Draw ==
=== Key ===
- Q = Qualifier
- WC = Wild card
- LL = Lucky loser
- Alt = Alternate
- SE = Special exempt
- PR = Protected ranking
- ITF = ITF entry
- JE = Junior exempt
- w/o = Walkover
- r = Retired
- d = Defaulted
- SR = Special ranking

=== Finals ===
Semifinals
1	(United Kingdom) Aljaž Bedene	7^{7}	6
(Italy) Marco Cecchinato	6^{3}	3
Q	(Italy) Matteo Donati	6^{3}	6	3
(Argentina) Nicolás Kicker	7^{7}	4	6

Final
1	(United Kingdom) Aljaž Bedene	7^{7}	6
(Argentina) Nicolás Kicker	6^{3}	4

=== Top half ===
First round
1	(United Kingdom) A Bedene	7^{13}	6
(Austria) G Melzer	6^{11}	2
WC	(Italy) F Gaio	3	3
(Germany) A Beck	6	6
(Belgium) G Gigounon	6	6
(Germany) P Gojowczyk	4	1
Q	(Portugal) FF Silva	6^{4}	6	6
7	(Italy) L Vanni	7^{7}	4	1
3	(Slovenia) B Rola	6	6^{5}	4
(Sweden) C Lindell	3	7^{7}	6
(Italy) T Fabbiano	1	4
(Italy) M Cecchinato	6	6
(Slovakia) J Kovalík	4	2
Q	(France) S Robert	6	6
WC	(Italy) G Mager	2	6	6
8	(Argentina) M González	6	4	3

Second round
1	(United Kingdom) A Bedene	6	5	6
(Germany) A Beck	3	7	2
(Belgium) G Gigounon	7^{7}	6
Q	(Portugal) FF Silva	6^{4}	3
(Sweden) C Lindell	3	2
(Italy) M Cecchinato	6	6
Q	(France) S Robert	7^{7}	6
WC	(Italy) G Mager	6^{4}	2

Quarterfinals
1	(United Kingdom) A Bedene	6	6
(Belgium) G Gigounon	4	1
(Italy) M Cecchinato	6	7^{7}
Q	(France) S Robert	3	6^{5}

Semifinals
1	(United Kingdom) A Bedene	7^{7}	6
(Italy) M Cecchinato	6^{3}	3

=== Bottom half ===
First round
5	(Belgium) K Coppejans	5	1
SE	(Slovakia) A Martin	7	6
(Romania) V Hănescu	6	2	2
WC	(Italy) A Arnaboldi	1	6	6
Q	(Italy) M Donati	2	7^{7}	6
(Argentina) R Olivo	6	6^{6}	3
Q	(Italy) L Giustino	3	1
4	(France) L Pouille	6	6
6/Alt	(Colombia) A González	6	6
(Estonia) J Zopp	2	3
(Belgium) N Desein	5	1
Alt	(France) M Bourgue	7	6
(Serbia) L Djere	4	1
(Spain) A Montañés	6	6
(Argentina) N Kicker	6	1	6
2	(Serbia) D Lajović	4	6	4

Second round
SE	(Slovakia) A Martin	6^{7}	6	3
WC	(Italy) A Arnaboldi	7^{9}	3	6
Q	(Italy) M Donati	7	4	6
4	(France) L Pouille	5	6	3
6/Alt	(Colombia) A González	6	2	6
Alt	(France) M Bourgue	4	6	4
(Spain) A Montañés	5	3
(Argentina) N Kicker	7	6

Quarterfinals
WC	(Italy) A Arnaboldi	6^{3}	4
Q	(Italy) M Donati	7^{7}	6
6/Alt	(Colombia) A González	3	2
(Argentina) N Kicker	6	6

Semifinals
Q	(Italy) M Donati	6^{3}	6	3
(Argentina) N Kicker	7^{7}	4	6
