= 2023 Internazionali di Tennis Città di Todi =

- Date: 14–19 August
- Edition: 17th
- Surface: Clay
- Location: Todi, Italy

Champions

Singles
- (Italy) Luciano Darderi

Doubles
- (Brazil) Fernando Romboli / (Brazil) Marcelo Zormann
← 2022 ·	Internazionali di Tennis Città di Todi	· 2024 →

The 2023 Internazionali di Tennis Città di Todi was a professional tennis tournament played on clay courts. It was the 17th edition of the tournament which was part of the 2023 ATP Challenger Tour. It took place in Todi, Italy between 14 and 19 August 2023.

== Singles main-draw entrants ==
=== Seeds ===
Country	Player	Rank^{1}	Seed
HUN	Zsombor Piros	120	1
~~ARG~~	~~Camilo Ugo Carabelli~~	~~171~~	~~2~~
ARG	Mariano Navone	177	3
CRO	Duje Ajduković	216	4
ITA	Andrea Pellegrino	217	5
ARG	Román Andrés Burruchaga	245	6
ITA	Luciano Darderi	248	7
ITA	Francesco Maestrelli	249	8

- ^{1} Rankings are as of 7 August 2023.

=== Other entrants ===
The following players received wildcards into the singles main draw:

- (Italy) Fabrizio Andaloro
- (Italy) Enrico Dalla Valle
- (Italy) Giorgio Tabacco

The following players received entry into the singles main draw as alternates:

- (Germany) Lucas Gerch
- (Spain) Carlos López Montagud

The following players received entry from the qualifying draw:

- (United Kingdom) Felix Gill
- (Brazil) Orlando Luz
- (Italy) Julian Ocleppo
- (Italy) Giovanni Oradini
- (Spain) Carlos Sánchez Jover
- (Serbia) Miljan Zekić

The following player received entry as a lucky loser:

- (France) Mathys Erhard

== Champions ==
=== Singles ===
- (Italy) Luciano Darderi def. (France) Clément Tabur 6–4, 6–7^{(5–7)}, 6–1.

=== Doubles ===
- (Brazil) Fernando Romboli / (Brazil) Marcelo Zormann def. (Argentina) Román Andrés Burruchaga / (Brazil) Orlando Luz 6–7^{(13–15)}, 6–4, [10–5].
