= 2024 Internazionali di Tennis Città di Todi – Doubles =

Doubles
- 2024 Internazionali di Tennis Città di Todi

Final
- Champions: (Serbia) Ivan Sabanov (Serbia) Matej Sabanov
- Runners-up: (Sweden) Filip Bergevi (Netherlands) Mick Veldheer
- Score: 6–4, 7–6^{(7–3)}

Events
Singles	Doubles
- Internazionali di Tennis Città di Todi

Fernando Romboli and Marcelo Zormann were the defending champions but chose not to defend their title.

Ivan and Matej Sabanov won the title after defeating Filip Bergevi and Mick Veldheer 6–4, 7–6^{(7–3)} in the final.

== Seeds ==
1. (France) Théo Arribagé / (France) Jonathan Eysseric (quarterfinals)
2. (Italy) Marco Bortolotti / (Australia) Matthew Romios (first round)
3. (Sweden) Filip Bergevi / (Netherlands) Mick Veldheer (final)
4. (Serbia) Ivan Sabanov / (Serbia) Matej Sabanov (champions)

== Draw ==
Key

- Q = Qualifier
- WC = Wild card
- LL = Lucky loser
- Alt = Alternate
- ITF = ITF entry
- PR = Protected ranking
- SR = Special ranking
- SE = Special exempt
- JE = Junior exempt
- JR = Junior Accelerator Programme entrant
- CO = College Accelerator Programme entrant
- NG = Next Gen Accelerator Program entrant
- w/o = Walkover
- r = Retired
- d = Defaulted

=== Draw ===
First round
1	(France) T Arribagé (France) J Eysseric	6	6
WC	(Spain) M Alcalá Gurri (Italy) Alessio De Bernardis	4	4
(Italy) Gabriele Maria Noce (Italy) L Rottoli	3	3
(Czech Republic) H Bartoň (Croatia) M Dodig	6	6
3	(Sweden) F Bergevi (Netherlands) M Veldheer	6	7
(Spain) Í Cervantes (Spain) D Vega Hernández	3	5
WC	(Italy) Peter Buldorini (Italy) G Vulpitta	2	2
(Italy) G Cadenasso (Italy) Niccolò Catini	6	6
(Brazil) L Britto (Israel) R Stepanov	6^{2}	6^{4}
(Argentina) V Aboian (Argentina) G Villanueva	7^{7}	7^{7}
(Croatia) Z Babić (Bulgaria) A Donski	5	4
4	(Serbia) I Sabanov (Serbia) M Sabanov	7	6
(Italy) G Ricca (Italy) Augusto Virgili	6	6
(United Kingdom) Liam Hignett (United Kingdom) J MacKinlay	2	4
(Italy) F Agamenone (Argentina) S Rodríguez Taverna	6	6
2	(Italy) M Bortolotti (Australia) MC Romios	2	4

Quarterfinals
1	(France) T Arribagé (France) J Eysseric	4	6^{8}
(Czech Republic) H Bartoň (Croatia) M Dodig	6	7^{10}
3	(Sweden) F Bergevi (Netherlands) M Veldheer	6	6
(Italy) G Cadenasso (Italy) N Catini	1	4
(Argentina) V Aboian (Argentina) G Villanueva	6	6^{3}	[5]
4	(Serbia) I Sabanov (Serbia) M Sabanov	4	7^{7}	[10]
(Italy) G Ricca (Italy) A Virgili	4	7^{7}	[11]
(Italy) F Agamenone (Argentina) S Rodríguez Taverna	6	6^{5}	[9]

Semifinals
(Czech Republic) H Bartoň (Croatia) M Dodig	6^{7}	6	[12]
3	(Sweden) F Bergevi (Netherlands) M Veldheer	7^{9}	3	[14]
4	(Serbia) I Sabanov (Serbia) M Sabanov	6	6
(Italy) G Ricca (Italy) A Virgili	2	1

Final
3	(Sweden) F Bergevi (Netherlands) M Veldheer	4	6^{3}
4	(Serbia) I Sabanov (Serbia) M Sabanov	6	7^{7}
