= 2019 Internazionali di Tennis Città dell'Aquila =

Men's tennis tournament

- Date: 19 – 25 August
- Edition: 13th
- Category: ATP Challenger Tour
- Surface: Clay
- Location: L'Aquila, Italy

Champions

Singles
- (Argentina) Andrea Collarini

Doubles
- (Bosnia and Herzegovina) Tomislav Brkić / (Croatia) Ante Pavić
← 2018 ·	Internazionali di Tennis Città dell'Aquila	· 2020 →

The 2019 Internazionali di Tennis Città dell'Aquila, also known for sponsorship reasons as the 2019 Aterno Gas & Power Tennis Cup, was a professional tennis tournament played on clay courts. It was the 13th edition of the men's tournament which was part of the 2019 ATP Challenger Tour. The event took place in L'Aquila, Italy between 19 – 25 August 2019.

== Singles main draw entrants ==
=== Seeds ===
Country	Player	Rank^{1}	Seed
SVK	Andrej Martin	136	1
CHI	Alejandro Tabilo	242	2
KAZ	Dmitry Popko	262	3
BRA	Thomaz Bellucci	263	4
RUS	Pavel Kotov	264	5
CRO	Nino Serdarušić	269	6
RUS	Aslan Karatsev	270	7
POR	Frederico Ferreira Silva	273	8
AUS	Aleksandar Vukic	274	9
ITA	Raúl Brancaccio	277	10
ARG	Facundo Mena	278	11
ITA	Gian Marco Moroni	288	12
IND	Sasikumar Mukund	290	13
ARG	Francisco Cerúndolo	292	14
SUI	Marc-Andrea Hüsler	303	15
CHI	Marcelo Tomás Barrios Vera	304	16

- ^{1} Rankings as of 12 August 2019.

=== Other entrants ===
The following players received wildcards into the singles main draw:

- (Spain) Carlos Alcaraz
- (Italy) Gianluca Di Nicola
- (Italy) Francesco Forti
- (Italy) Luca Pancaldi
- (Hungary) Máté Valkusz

The following player received entry into the singles main draw as an alternate:

- (Croatia) Ante Pavić

The following players received entry into the singles main draw using their ITF World Tennis Ranking:

- (Argentina) Francisco Cerúndolo
- (Argentina) Juan Pablo Ficovich
- (France) Tom Jomby
- (Australia) Christopher O'Connell
- (Kazakhstan) Dmitry Popko

The following players received entry from the qualifying draw:

- (Colombia) Cristian Rodríguez
- (Italy) Andrea Vavassori

== Champions ==
=== Singles ===
- (Argentina) Andrea Collarini def. (Slovakia) Andrej Martin 6–3, 6–1.

=== Doubles ===
- (Bosnia and Herzegovina) Tomislav Brkić / (Croatia) Ante Pavić def. (Switzerland) Luca Margaroli / (Italy) Andrea Vavassori 6–3, 6–2.
