= 2017 Internazionali di Tennis dell'Umbria – Doubles =

Doubles
- 2017 Internazionali di Tennis dell'Umbria

Final
- Champions: (Australia) Steven de Waard (New Zealand) Ben McLachlan
- Runners-up: (Croatia) Marin Draganja (Croatia) Tomislav Draganja
- Score: 6–7^{(7–9)}, 6–4, [10–7]

Events
Singles	Doubles
- Internazionali di Tennis dell'Umbria

Marcelo Demoliner and Fabrício Neis were the defending champions but chose not to defend their title.

Steven de Waard and Ben McLachlan won the title after defeating Marin and Tomislav Draganja 6–7^{(7–9)}, 6–4, [10–7] in the final.

== Seeds ==
1. (Australia) Steven de Waard / (New Zealand) Ben McLachlan (champions)
2. (Croatia) Marin Draganja / (Croatia) Tomislav Draganja (final)
3. (Turkey) Tuna Altuna / (Italy) Alessandro Motti (first round)
4. (Poland) Tomasz Bednarek / (Netherlands) David Pel (semifinals)

== Draw ==
Key

- Q = Qualifier
- WC = Wild card
- LL = Lucky loser
- Alt = Alternate
- ITF = ITF entry
- PR = Protected ranking
- SR = Special ranking
- SE = Special exempt
- JE = Junior exempt
- JR = Junior Accelerator Programme entrant
- CO = College Accelerator Programme entrant
- NG = Next Gen Accelerator Program entrant
- w/o = Walkover
- r = Retired
- d = Defaulted

First round
(Italy) Pietro Licciardi (Italy) GM Moroni	2	6	[10]
(Italy) S Caruso (Brazil) G Clezar	6	2	[5]
4	(Poland) T Bednarek (Netherlands) D Pel	6	6
WC	(Italy) Alessio De Bernardis (Italy) Andrea Del Federico	3	0
(Colombia) DE Galán (Colombia) C Rodríguez	7	6^{3}	[10]
WC	(Italy) Gianluca Di Nicola (Italy) Samuele Ramazzotti	5	7^{7}	[8]
(Spain) R Ojeda Lara (Spain) C Taberner
(Lithuania) L Grigelis (Italy) S Travaglia	w/o
(Mexico) H Hach Verdugo (United States) A Lawson	6	6^{3}	[13]
3	(Turkey) T Altuna (Italy) A Motti	1	7^{7}	[11]
(Italy) L Caruana (Italy) G Mager	6	6
(Italy) Omar Giacalone (Italy) Antonio Massara	3	2
WC	(Italy) Mauro Antonini (Italy) Lorenzo Tarpani	1	0
2	(Croatia) M Draganja (Croatia) T Draganja	6	6

Quarterfinals
1	(Australia) S de Waard (New Zealand) B McLachlan	7^{7}	7^{7}
(Italy) P Licciardi (Italy) GM Moroni	6^{4}	6^{0}
4	(Poland) T Bednarek (Netherlands) D Pel	6	6
(Colombia) DE Galán (Colombia) C Rodríguez	3	1
(Lithuania) L Grigelis (Italy) S Travaglia	6	6
(Mexico) H Hach Verdugo (United States) A Lawson	2	4
(Italy) L Caruana (Italy) G Mager	3	2
2	(Croatia) M Draganja (Croatia) T Draganja	6	6

Semifinals
1	(Australia) S de Waard (New Zealand) B McLachlan	6	3	[10]
4	(Poland) T Bednarek (Netherlands) D Pel	3	6	[6]
(Lithuania) L Grigelis (Italy) S Travaglia	1	5
2	(Croatia) M Draganja (Croatia) T Draganja	6	7

Final
1	(Australia) S de Waard (New Zealand) B McLachlan	6^{7}	6	[10]
2	(Croatia) M Draganja (Croatia) T Draganja	7^{9}	4	[7]
