= 2024 Internazionali di Tennis Città di Todi – Singles =

Singles
- 2024 Internazionali di Tennis Città di Todi

Final
- Champion: (Spain) Carlos Taberner
- Runner-up: (Argentina) Santiago Rodríguez Taverna
- Score: 6–4, 6–3

Events
Singles	Doubles
- Internazionali di Tennis Città di Todi

Luciano Darderi was the defending champion but chose not to defend his title.

Carlos Taberner won the title after defeating Santiago Rodríguez Taverna 6–4, 6–3 in the final.

== Seeds ==
1. (Italy) Stefano Travaglia (semifinals)
2. (Romania) Filip Cristian Jianu (first round)
3. (France) Clément Tabur (first round)
4. (Italy) Francesco Maestrelli (second round)
5. (Argentina) Genaro Alberto Olivieri (first round)
6. (Argentina) Andrea Collarini (first round)
7. (France) Geoffrey Blancaneaux (first round)
8. (Italy) Enrico Dalla Valle (withdrew)
9. (Italy) Gianluca Mager (first round)

== Draw ==
Key

- Q = Qualifier
- WC = Wild card
- LL = Lucky loser
- Alt = Alternate
- ITF = ITF entry
- PR = Protected ranking
- SR = Special ranking
- SE = Special exempt
- JE = Junior exempt
- JR = Junior Accelerator Programme entrant
- CO = College Accelerator Programme entrant
- NG = Next Gen Accelerator Program entrant
- w/o = Walkover
- r = Retired
- d = Defaulted

=== Finals ===
Semifinals
1	(Italy) Stefano Travaglia	6	4	2
(Spain) Carlos Taberner	4	6	6
(Romania) Cezar Crețu	6	6^{5}	4
(Argentina) Santiago Rodríguez Taverna	3	7^{7}	6

Final
(Spain) Carlos Taberner	6	6
(Argentina) Santiago Rodríguez Taverna	4	3

=== Top half ===
First round
1	(Italy) S Travaglia	5	6	6
Alt	(Argentina) JB Torres	7	3	4
WC	(Italy) G Piraino	1	2
(Spain) Carlos López Montagud	6	6
LL	(Australia) Matthew Dellavedova	1	1
(Portugal) G Elias	6	6
(Italy) F Agamenone	6	7
5	(Argentina) GA Olivieri	3	5
4	(Italy) F Maestrelli	7^{7}	3
Alt	(Italy) Andrea Picchione	6^{4}	2^{r}
(Austria) L Neumayer	7^{7}	3	0
Q	(France) L Pavlovic	6^{4}	6	6
Q	(Italy) Pierluigi Basile	6^{1}	6	6
WC	(Italy) Gabriele Pennaforti	7^{7}	4	3
(Spain) C Taberner	6	6
7	(France) G Blancaneaux	3	1

Second round
1	(Italy) S Travaglia	6	6
(Spain) C López Montagud	4	4
(Portugal) G Elias	6	6
(Italy) F Agamenone	4	3
4	(Italy) F Maestrelli	6	2	3
Q	(France) L Pavlovic	2	6	6
Q	(Italy) P Basile	3	3
(Spain) C Taberner	6	6

Quarterfinals
1	(Italy) S Travaglia	7^{7}	6
(Portugal) G Elias	6^{1}	4
Q	(France) L Pavlovic	4	7^{8}	6^{5}
(Spain) C Taberner	6	6^{6}	7^{7}

Semifinals
1	(Italy) S Travaglia	6	4	2
(Spain) C Taberner	4	6	6

=== Bottom half ===
First round
9	(Italy) G Mager	3	3
(United Kingdom) F Gill	6	6
(Italy) G Fonio	2	1
(Romania) C Crețu	6	6
Alt	(Slovakia) M Kližan	4	3
Q	(Italy) Facundo Juárez	6	6
Q	(Argentina) LE Ambrogi	7	7^{7}
3	(France) C Tabur	5	6^{5}
6	(Argentina) A Collarini	3	5
(Croatia) M Dodig	6	7
Q	(Italy) G Cadenasso	3	3
(Italy) L Giustino	6	6
WC	(Italy) G Ferrari	4	0
Q	(Italy) Luca Castagnola	6	6
(Argentina) S Rodríguez Taverna	6	0	6
2	(Romania) FC Jianu	4	6	3

Second round
(United Kingdom) F Gill	6	6^{5}	4
(Romania) C Crețu	2	7^{7}	6
Q	(Italy) F Juárez	6	6
Q	(Argentina) LE Ambrogi	3	2
(Croatia) M Dodig	6	6^{4}	1
(Italy) L Giustino	4	7^{7}	6
Q	(Italy) L Castagnola	6^{7}	3
(Argentina) S Rodríguez Taverna	7^{9}	6

Quarterfinals
(Romania) C Crețu	5	7	0
Q	(Italy) F Juárez	7	5	0^{r}
(Italy) L Giustino	6	2	4
(Argentina) S Rodríguez Taverna	2	6	6

Semifinals
(Romania) C Crețu	6	6^{5}	4
(Argentina) S Rodríguez Taverna	3	7^{7}	6
