= 2018 Internazionali di Tennis Città dell'Aquila =

- Date: 18 – 24 June
- Edition: 12th
- Category: ATP Challenger Tour
- Surface: Clay
- Location: L'Aquila, Italy

Champions

Singles
- (Argentina) Facundo Bagnis

Doubles
- (Italy) Filippo Baldi / (Italy) Andrea Pellegrino
← 2017 ·	Internazionali di Tennis Città dell'Aquila	· 2019 →

The 2018 Internazionali di Tennis Città dell'Aquila was a professional tennis tournament played on clay courts. It was the 12th edition of the men's tournament which was part of the 2018 ATP Challenger Tour. The event took place in L'Aquila, Italy between 18 – 24 June 2018.

== Singles main draw entrants ==
=== Seeds ===
Country	Player	Rank^{1}	Seed
ESP	Roberto Carballés Baena	73	1
ITA	Paolo Lorenzi	74	2
BOL	Hugo Dellien	113	3
BRA	Rogério Dutra Silva	139	4
BRA	Thiago Monteiro	140	5
ARG	Facundo Bagnis	192	6
ITA	Gianluigi Quinzi	200	7
ITA	Luca Vanni	201	8

- ^{1} Rankings as of 11 June 2018.

=== Other entrants ===
The following players received wildcards into the singles main draw:

- (Italy) Riccardo Balzerani
- (Italy) Giovanni Fonio
- (Italy) Julian Ocleppo
- (Italy) Andrea Pellegrino

The following players received entry into the singles main draw as alternates:

- (Argentina) Facundo Bagnis
- (Italy) Filippo Baldi

The following players received entry from the qualifying draw:

- (Italy) Riccardo Bonadio
- (Germany) Johannes Härteis
- (Germany) Benjamin Hassan
- (Argentina) Agustín Velotti

The following player received entry as a lucky loser:

- (Italy) Gianluca Mager

== Champions ==
=== Singles ===
- (Argentina) Facundo Bagnis def. (Italy) Paolo Lorenzi 2–6, 6–3, 6–4.

=== Doubles ===
- (Italy) Filippo Baldi / (Italy) Andrea Pellegrino def. (Spain) Pedro Martínez / (Netherlands) Mark Vervoort 4–6, 6–3, [10–5].
