= 2016 Internazionali di Tennis dell'Umbria =

- Date: 4 – 10 July
- Edition: 10th
- Category: ATP Challenger Tour
- Prize money: €42,500+H
- Surface: Clay
- Location: Todi, Italy

Champions

Singles
- (Serbia) Miljan Zekić

Doubles
- (Brazil) Marcelo Demoliner / (Brazil) Fabrício Neis
← 2015 ·	Internazionali di Tennis dell'Umbria	· 2017 →

The 2016 Internazionali di Tennis dell'Umbria is a professional tennis tournament played on clay courts. It is the 10th edition of the men's tournament which is part of the 2016 ATP Challenger Tour, offering a total of €42,500+H in prize money. The event will take place at the Tennis Club Todi in Todi, Italy, on 4 – 10 July 2016.

== Singles main draw entrants ==
=== Seeds ===
Country	Player	Rank^{1}	Seed
SVK	Andrej Martin	105	1
ITA	Marco Cecchinato	130	2
ARG	Marco Trungelliti	150	3
HUN	Márton Fucsovics	163	4
ITA	Alessandro Giannessi	164	5
ITA	Luca Vanni	171	6
ARG	Facundo Argüello	175	7
TUR	Marsel İlhan	180	8

- ^{1} Rankings as of 27 June 2016

=== Other entrants ===
The following players received wildcards into the singles main draw:

- (Italy) Federico Gaio
- (Italy) Stefano Napolitano
- (Italy) Gianluigi Quinzi
- (Italy) Lorenzo Sonego

The following player received entry as an alternate:

- (Russia) Daniil Medvedev

The following players received entry from the qualifying draw:

- (Bosnia and Herzegovina) Tomislav Brkić
- (Italy) Salvatore Caruso
- (India) Ramkumar Ramanathan
- (Serbia) Miljan Zekić

The following player received entry as a lucky loser:

- (Turkey) Cem İlkel

== Champions ==
=== Singles ===
- (Serbia) Miljan Zekić def. (Italy) Stefano Napolitano, 6–7^{(6–8)}, 6–4, 6–3

=== Doubles ===
- (Brazil) Marcelo Demoliner / (Brazil) Fabrício Neis def. (Italy) Salvatore Caruso / (Italy) Alessandro Giannessi, 6–1, 3–6, [10–5]
