= 2015 Distal & ITR Group Tennis Cup =

- Date: 6 – 12 July
- Edition: 9th
- Category: ATP Challenger Tour
- Prize money: €42,500+H
- Surface: Clay
- Location: Todi, Italy

Champions

Singles
- (United Kingdom) Aljaž Bedene

Doubles
- (Italy) Flavio Cipolla / (Argentina) Máximo González
← 2014 ·	Internazionali di Tennis dell'Umbria	· 2016 →

The 2015 Distal & ITR Group Tennis Cup was a professional tennis tournament played on clay courts. It was the 9th edition of the men's tournament which was part of the 2015 ATP Challenger Tour, offering a total of €42,500+H in prize money. The event took place at the Tennis Club Todi in Todi, Italy, on 6 – 12 July 2015.

== Singles main draw entrants ==
=== Seeds ===
Country	Player	Rank^{1}	Seed
GBR	Aljaž Bedene	75	1
SRB	Dušan Lajović	86	2
SLO	Blaž Rola	93	3
FRA	Lucas Pouille	96	4
BEL	Kimmer Coppejans	97	5
COL	Alejandro González	104	6
ITA	Luca Vanni	113	7
ARG	Máximo González	115	8

- ^{1} Rankings as of 29 June 2015

=== Other entrants ===
The following players received wildcards into the singles main draw:

- (Italy) Andrea Arnaboldi
- (Italy) Federico Gaio
- (Italy) Gianluca Mager

The following players received entry as alternates:

- (France) Mathias Bourgue
- (Colombia) Alejandro González

The following player received entry as a special exempt:

- (Slovakia) Andrej Martin

The following players received entry from the qualifying draw:

- (Italy) Matteo Donati
- (Italy) Lorenzo Giustino
- (France) Stéphane Robert
- (Portugal) Frederico Ferreira Silva

== Champions ==
=== Singles ===
- (United Kingdom) Aljaž Bedene def. (Argentina) Nicolás Kicker 7–6^{(7–3)}, 6–4

=== Doubles ===
- (Italy) Flavio Cipolla / (Argentina) Máximo González def. (Germany) Andreas Beck / (Germany) Peter Gojowczyk 6–4, 6–1
