= 2022 Internazionali di Tennis Città di Todi =

- Date: 4–10 July
- Edition: 16th
- Surface: Clay
- Location: Todi, Italy

Champions

Singles
- (Argentina) Pedro Cachin

Doubles
- (Argentina) Guido Andreozzi / (Argentina) Guillermo Durán
← 2021 ·	Internazionali di Tennis Città di Todi	· 2023 →

The 2022 Internazionali di Tennis Città di Todi was a professional tennis tournament played on clay courts. It was the 16th edition of the tournament which was part of the 2022 ATP Challenger Tour. It took place in Todi, Italy between 4 and 10 July 2022.

== Singles main-draw entrants ==
=== Seeds ===
Country	Player	Rank^{1}	Seed
ARG	Pedro Cachin	120	1
ITA	Flavio Cobolli	145	2
FRA	Alexandre Müller	161	3
CRO	Nino Serdarušić	167	4
ARG	Santiago Rodríguez Taverna	176	5
SVK	Filip Horanský	191	6
ARG	Thiago Agustín Tirante	194	7
KAZ	Dmitry Popko	195	8

- ^{1} Rankings are as of 27 June 2022.

=== Other entrants ===
The following players received wildcards into the singles main draw:

- (Italy) Mattia Bellucci
- (Italy) Matteo Gigante
- (Italy) Francesco Passaro

The following player received entry into the singles main draw as a special exempt:

- (Argentina) Juan Bautista Torres

The following player received entry into the singles main draw as an alternate:

- (Netherlands) Jelle Sels

The following players received entry from the qualifying draw:

- (Switzerland) Rémy Bertola
- Andrey Chepelev
- (Belgium) Joris De Loore
- (Italy) Giovanni Fonio
- (United Kingdom) Billy Harris
- (Italy) Francesco Maestrelli

== Champions ==
=== Singles ===
- (Argentina) Pedro Cachin def. (Argentina) Nicolás Kicker 6–4, 6–4.

=== Doubles ===
- (Argentina) Guido Andreozzi / (Argentina) Guillermo Durán def. (Monaco) Romain Arneodo / (France) Jonathan Eysseric 6–1, 2–6, [10–6].
