= 2022 Internazionali di Tennis Città di Todi – Singles =

Singles
- 2022 Internazionali di Tennis Città di Todi

Final
- Champion: (Argentina) Pedro Cachin
- Runner-up: (Argentina) Nicolás Kicker
- Score: 6–4, 6–4

Events
Singles	Doubles
- Internazionali di Tennis Città di Todi

Mario Vilella Martínez was the defending champion but chose not to defend his title.

Pedro Cachin won the title after defeating Nicolás Kicker 6–4, 6–4 in the final.

== Seeds ==
1. (Argentina) Pedro Cachin (champion)
2. (Italy) Flavio Cobolli (quarterfinals)
3. (France) Alexandre Müller (first round)
4. (Croatia) Nino Serdarušić (second round)
5. (Argentina) Santiago Rodríguez Taverna (quarterfinals)
6. (Slovakia) Filip Horanský (first round)
7. (Argentina) Thiago Agustín Tirante (second round)
8. (Kazakhstan) Dmitry Popko (first round)

== Draw ==
Key

- Q = Qualifier
- WC = Wild card
- LL = Lucky loser
- Alt = Alternate
- ITF = ITF entry
- PR = Protected ranking
- SR = Special ranking
- SE = Special exempt
- JE = Junior exempt
- JR = Junior Accelerator Programme entrant
- CO = College Accelerator Programme entrant
- NG = Next Gen Accelerator Program entrant
- w/o = Walkover
- r = Retired
- d = Defaulted

=== Finals ===
Semifinals
1	(Argentina) Pedro Cachin	6^{7}	6	6
WC	(Italy) Francesco Passaro	7^{9}	2	1
(Germany) Daniel Masur	2	6	4
(Argentina) Nicolás Kicker	6	3	6

Final
1	(Argentina) Pedro Cachin	6	6
(Argentina) Nicolás Kicker	4	4

=== Top half ===
First round
1	(Argentina) P Cachin	6	7^{7}
(Slovakia) L Klein	2	6^{4}
WC	(Italy) M Gigante	6	7
(Italy) F Gaio	3	5
(Brazil) D Dutra da Silva	6	4	6
Q	(United Kingdom) B Harris	3	6	1
Q	(Switzerland) R Bertola	7	3	4
5	(Argentina) S Rodríguez Taverna	5	6	6
4	(Croatia) N Serdarušić	6	4	3
(Croatia) D Ajduković	4	6	2^{r}
Q	(Belgium) J De Loore	6	4	1
WC	(Italy) F Passaro	2	6	6
(Italy) GM Moroni	4	5
(Italy) L Darderi	6	7
Q	(Italy) G Fonio	6	3	6
8	(Kazakhstan) D Popko	4	6	1

Second round
1	(Argentina) P Cachin	7^{7}	6
WC	(Italy) M Gigante	6^{4}	0
(Brazil) D Dutra da Silva	2	6	2
5	(Argentina) S Rodríguez Taverna	6	4	6
4	(Croatia) N Serdarušić	4	6^{1}
WC	(Italy) F Passaro	6	7^{7}
(Italy) L Darderi	6	7^{7}
Q	(Italy) G Fonio	3	6^{3}

Quarterfinals
1	(Argentina) P Cachin	6	6
5	(Argentina) S Rodríguez Taverna	3	2
WC	(Italy) F Passaro	6^{3}	6	6
(Italy) L Darderi	7^{7}	3	4

Semifinals
1	(Argentina) P Cachin	6^{7}	6	6
WC	(Italy) F Passaro	7^{9}	2	1

=== Bottom half ===
First round
7	(Argentina) TA Tirante	4	6	6
Q	Andrey Chepelev	6	3	2
WC	(Italy) M Bellucci	3	7^{7}	2
(Germany) D Masur	6	6^{5}	6
(France) E Furness	6	3	2
SE	(Argentina) JB Torres	4	6	6
Q	(Italy) F Maestrelli	3	7^{7}	6
3	(France) A Müller	6	6^{2}	1
6	(Slovakia) F Horanský	7	3	1
(Kazakhstan) T Skatov	5	6	6
(Argentina) N Kicker	3	7	1
(Netherlands) J de Jong	6	5	0^{r}
(Italy) M Arnaldi	3	4
Alt	(Netherlands) J Sels	6	6
(Argentina) A Collarini	3	3
2	(Italy) F Cobolli	6	6

Second round
7	(Argentina) TA Tirante	4	1
(Germany) D Masur	6	6
SE	(Argentina) JB Torres	7^{7}	6^{2}	2
Q	(Italy) F Maestrelli	6^{5}	7^{7}	6
(Kazakhstan) T Skatov	4	3
(Argentina) N Kicker	6	6
Alt	(Netherlands) J Sels	4	4
2	(Italy) F Cobolli	6	6

Quarterfinals
(Germany) D Masur	6	6
Q	(Italy) F Maestrelli	2	3
(Argentina) N Kicker	6	6
2	(Italy) F Cobolli	3	3

Semifinals
(Germany) D Masur	2	6	4
(Argentina) N Kicker	6	3	6
