= 2017 Internazionali di Tennis dell'Umbria =

- Date: 19 – 25 June
- Edition: 11th
- Category: ATP Challenger Tour
- Surface: Clay
- Location: Todi, Italy

Champions

Singles
- (Argentina) Federico Delbonis

Doubles
- (Australia) Steven de Waard / (New Zealand) Ben McLachlan
← 2016 ·	Internazionali di Tennis dell'Umbria	· 2018 →

The 2017 Internazionali di Tennis dell'Umbria was a professional tennis tournament played on clay courts. It was the 11th edition of the men's tournament which was part of the 2017 ATP Challenger Tour. The event took place at the Tennis Club Todi in Todi, Italy, between 19 and 25 June 2017.

== Singles main draw entrants ==
=== Seeds ===
Country	Player	Rank^{1}	Seed
SRB	Dušan Lajović	84	1
ITA	Marco Cecchinato	97	2
MDA	Radu Albot	101	3
ARG	Facundo Bagnis	104	4
ARG	Federico Delbonis	110	5
POR	Gastão Elias	111	6
BEL	Arthur De Greef	117	7
ITA	Alessandro Giannessi	118	8

- ^{1} Rankings as of 12 June 2017.

=== Other entrants ===
The following players received wildcards into the singles main draw:

- (Italy) Simone Bolelli
- (Italy) Liam Caruana
- (Italy) Gianluca Mager
- (Italy) Lorenzo Sonego

The following player received entry into the singles main draw as an alternate:

- (Serbia) Miljan Zekić

The following players received entry from the qualifying draw:

- (Colombia) Daniel Elahi Galán
- (Austria) Andreas Haider-Maurer
- (Ukraine) Artem Smirnov
- (Spain) Carlos Taberner

== Champions ==
=== Singles ===
- (Argentina) Federico Delbonis def. (Italy) Marco Cecchinato 7–5, 6–1.

=== Doubles ===
- (Australia) Steven de Waard / (New Zealand) Ben McLachlan def. (Croatia) Marin Draganja / (Croatia) Tomislav Draganja 6–7^{(7–9)}, 6–4, [10–7].
