= 2017 Internazionali di Tennis dell'Umbria – Singles =

Singles
- 2017 Internazionali di Tennis dell'Umbria

Final
- Champion: (Argentina) Federico Delbonis
- Runner-up: (Italy) Marco Cecchinato
- Score: 7–5, 6–1

Events
Singles	Doubles
- Internazionali di Tennis dell'Umbria

Miljan Zekić was the defending champion but lost in the first round to Arthur De Greef.

Federico Delbonis won the title after defeating Marco Cecchinato 7–5, 6–1 in the final.

== Seeds ==
1. (Serbia) Dušan Lajović (semifinals)
2. (Italy) Marco Cecchinato (final)
3. (Moldova) Radu Albot (first round)
4. (Argentina) Facundo Bagnis (quarterfinals)
5. (Argentina) Federico Delbonis (champion)
6. (Portugal) Gastão Elias (quarterfinals)
7. (Belgium) Arthur De Greef (quarterfinals)
8. (Italy) Alessandro Giannessi (first round, retired)

== Draw ==
Key

- Q = Qualifier
- WC = Wild card
- LL = Lucky loser
- Alt = Alternate
- ITF = ITF entry
- PR = Protected ranking
- SR = Special ranking
- SE = Special exempt
- JE = Junior exempt
- JR = Junior Accelerator Programme entrant
- CO = College Accelerator Programme entrant
- NG = Next Gen Accelerator Program entrant
- w/o = Walkover
- r = Retired
- d = Defaulted

=== Finals ===
Semifinals
1	(Serbia) Dušan Lajović	3	4
5	(Argentina) Federico Delbonis	6	6
WC	(Italy) Liam Caruana	2	2
2	(Italy) Marco Cecchinato	6	6

Final
5	(Argentina) Federico Delbonis	7	6
2	(Italy) Marco Cecchinato	5	1

=== Top half ===
First round
1	(Serbia) D Lajović	6	6
(Spain) R Ojeda Lara	1	1
Q	(Ukraine) A Smirnov	6	2	4
(Spain) J Munar	4	6	6
(Italy) M Donati	5	6	6
(Italy) F Gaio	7	1	1
(Brazil) G Clezar	6	3	4
6	(Portugal) G Elias	3	6	6
4	(Argentina) F Bagnis	6	0	7
(Germany) Jeremy Jahn	4	6	5
WC	(Italy) S Bolelli	7^{7}	6
Q	(Spain) C Taberner	6^{5}	2
(Belgium) Y Reuter	4	4
(Italy) S Travaglia	6	6
(Spain) E López-Pérez	1	3
5	(Argentina) F Delbonis	6	6

Second round
1	(Serbia) D Lajović	6	6
(Spain) J Munar	3	3
(Italy) M Donati	6^{4}	2
6	(Portugal) G Elias	7^{7}	6
4	(Argentina) F Bagnis	6	2	6
WC	(Italy) S Bolelli	3	6	2
(Italy) S Travaglia	4	7	5
5	(Argentina) F Delbonis	6	5	7

Quarterfinals
1	(Serbia) D Lajović	6	6
6	(Portugal) G Elias	3	4
4	(Argentina) F Bagnis	6	5	1
5	(Argentina) F Delbonis	1	7	6

Semifinals
1	(Serbia) D Lajović	3	4
5	(Argentina) F Delbonis	6	6

=== Bottom half ===
First round
8	(Italy) A Giannessi	6	0^{r}
(Lithuania) L Grigelis	3	1
(Italy) A Arnaboldi	4	3^{r}
WC	(Italy) L Caruana	6	4
Q	(Austria) A Haider-Maurer	4	6	2
WC	(Italy) L Sonego	6	3	0^{r}
(France) G Sakharov	7^{7}	7^{7}
3	(Moldova) R Albot	6^{4}	6^{2}
7	(Belgium) A De Greef	6	6
Alt	(Serbia) M Zekić	2	4
(Chile) C Garin	6^{5}	2
(Slovakia) J Kovalík	7^{7}	6
WC	(Italy) G Mager	4	6^{2}
(Italy) S Caruso	6	7^{7}
Q	(Colombia) DE Galán	3	4
2	(Italy) M Cecchinato	6	6

Second round
(Lithuania) L Grigelis	5	3
WC	(Italy) L Caruana	7	6
Q	(Austria) A Haider-Maurer	2	4
(France) G Sakharov	6	6
7	(Belgium) A De Greef	6	6
(Slovakia) J Kovalík	2	3
(Italy) S Caruso	3	3
2	(Italy) M Cecchinato	6	6

Quarterfinals
WC	(Italy) L Caruana	6	7
(France) G Sakharov	4	5
7	(Belgium) A De Greef	5	3
2	(Italy) M Cecchinato	7	6

Semifinals
WC	(Italy) L Caruana	2	2
2	(Italy) M Cecchinato	6	6
