= 2024 Internazionali di Tennis Città di Todi =

- Date: 12–17 August
- Edition: 18th
- Surface: Clay
- Location: Todi, Italy

Champions

Singles
- (Spain) Carlos Taberner

Doubles
- (Serbia) Ivan Sabanov / (Serbia) Matej Sabanov
- Internazionali di Tennis Città di Todi

The 2024 Internazionali di Tennis Città di Todi was a professional tennis tournament played on clay courts. It was the 18th edition of the tournament which was part of the 2024 ATP Challenger Tour. It took place in Todi, Italy between 12 and 17 August 2024.

== Singles main-draw entrants ==
=== Seeds ===
Country	Player	Rank^{1}	Seed
ITA	Stefano Travaglia	236	1
ROU	Filip Cristian Jianu	238	2
FRA	Clément Tabur	244	3
ITA	Francesco Maestrelli	246	4
ARG	Genaro Alberto Olivieri	249	5
ARG	Andrea Collarini	257	6
FRA	Geoffrey Blancaneaux	259	7
~~ITA~~	~~Enrico Dalla Valle~~	~~261~~	~~8~~
ITA	Gianluca Mager	266	9

- ^{1} Rankings are as of 5 August 2024.

=== Other entrants ===
The following players received wildcards into the singles main draw:

- (Italy) Gianmarco Ferrari
- (Italy) Gabriele Pennaforti
- (Italy) Gabriele Piraino

The following players received entry into the singles main draw as alternates:

- (Italy) ~~Marco Cecchinato~~
- (Slovakia) Martin Kližan
- (Italy) Andrea Picchione
- (Argentina) Juan Bautista Torres

The following players received entry from the qualifying draw:

- (Argentina) Luciano Emanuel Ambrogi
- (Italy) Pierluigi Basile
- (Italy) Gianluca Cadenasso
- (Italy) Luca Castagnola
- (Italy) Facundo Juárez
- (France) Luka Pavlovic

The following player received entry as a lucky loser:

- (Australia) Matthew Dellavedova

== Champions ==
=== Singles ===
- (Spain) Carlos Taberner def. (Argentina) Santiago Rodríguez Taverna 6–4, 6–3.

=== Doubles ===
- (Serbia) Ivan Sabanov / (Serbia) Matej Sabanov def. (Sweden) Filip Bergevi / (Netherlands) Mick Veldheer 6–4, 7–6^{(7–3)}.
