= Ben McLachlan =

New Zealand-born Japanese tennis player

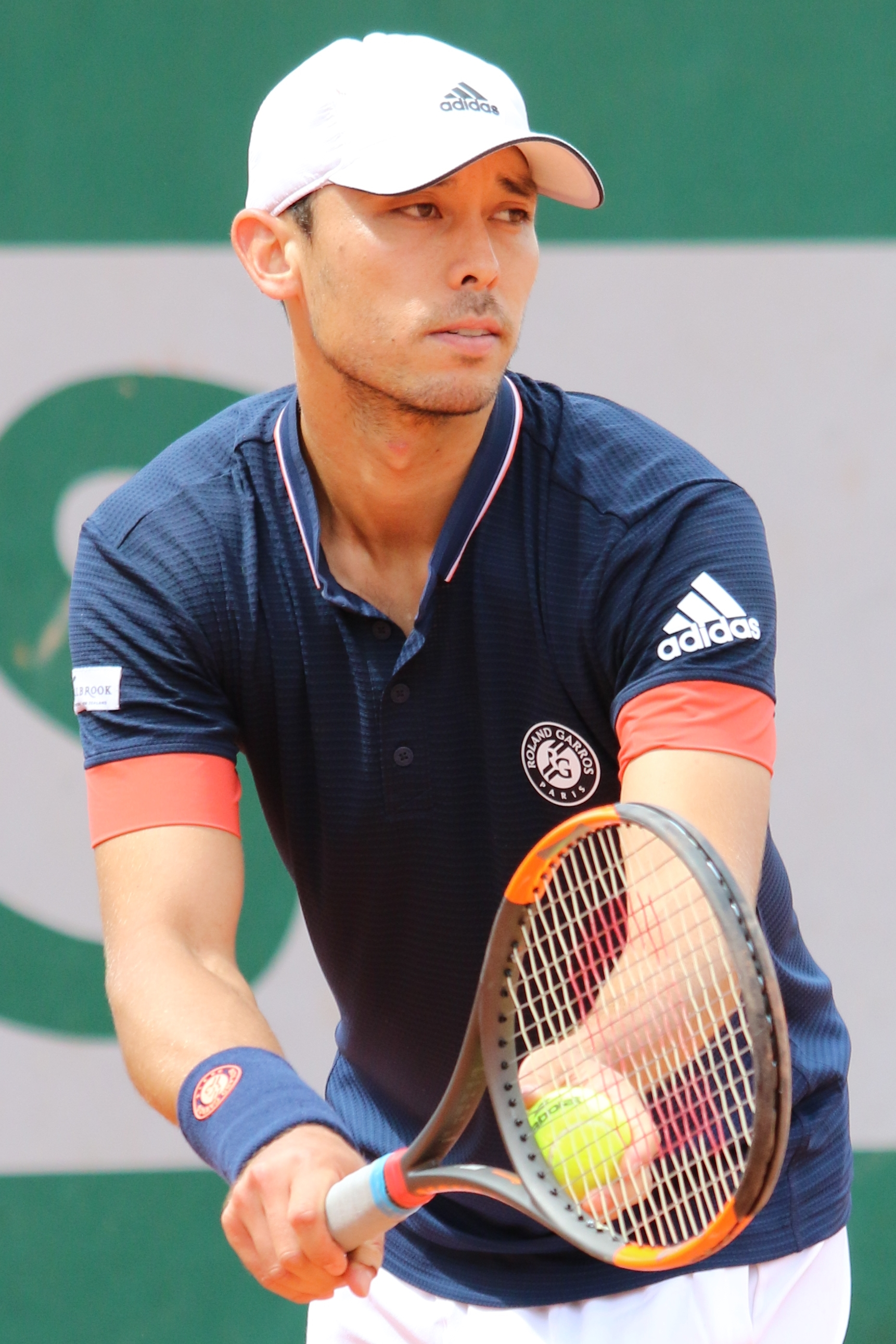
- McLachlan at the 2018 French Open
- Country (sports): New Zealand (2012 – 25 June 2017); Japan (26 June 2017 –)
- Residence: Queenstown, New Zealand
- Born: 10 May 1992 (age 34) Queenstown, New Zealand
- Height: 1.85 m (6 ft 1 in)
- Turned pro: May 2014
- Retired: 2024
- Plays: Right-handed (one-handed backhand)
- College: California
- Coach: Riki McLachlan, Lan Bale
- Prize money: US$1,492,230

Singles
- Career record: 0–0
- Career titles: 0
- Highest ranking: No. 729 (15 June 2015)

Doubles
- Career record: 130–150
- Career titles: 7 (and 6 Challenger)
- Highest ranking: No. 18 (5 November 2018)

Grand Slam doubles results
- Australian Open: SF (2018)
- French Open: 2R (2021)
- Wimbledon: QF (2018, 2021)
- US Open: QF (2019)

Other doubles tournaments
- Olympic Games: QF (2021)

Grand Slam mixed doubles results
- Australian Open: QF (2022)
- French Open: 2R (2022)
- Wimbledon: 3R (2018)
- US Open: 2R (2021)
- Last updated on: 31 December 2025.

Ben McLachlan (/məˈklɒxlən/ mə-KLOKH-lən; マクラクラン 勉, Makurakuran Ben; born 10 May 1992) is a Japanese former professional tennis player who previously represented New Zealand.

He is a doubles specialist with a career-high ATP ranking of world No. 18, achieved in November 2018. McLachlan has won seven doubles titles on the ATP Tour, including three at ATP 500 level. He reached his first Grand Slam semifinal at the 2018 Australian Open alongside Jan-Lennard Struff, and has reached four further major quarterfinals in men's and mixed doubles. McLachlan has represented Japan in the Davis Cup since 2017, and also competed at the 2020 Olympic Games in Tokyo, reaching the quarterfinals in both men's and mixed doubles.

== Early life ==
McLachlan was born in Queenstown, New Zealand. His mother Yuriko is Japanese and his father Craig is Kiwi. He attended Wakatipu High School and then joined the California Golden Bears at the University of California from 2011 to 2014, along with his brother Riki, who has since become Ben's primary tennis coach. Former player and family friend Lan Bale recommended the brothers to University of California head tennis coach Peter Wright when they were 12 and 13 years old. McLachlan took regular trips to Japan as a child, learning "reasonably fluent" Japanese, and switched to representing Japan in 2017. Bale and Thomas Shimada helped to facilitate the change of allegiance, in order for McLachlan to take advantage of the funding and support on offer from the Japan Tennis Association. McLachlan got engaged to Georgia Brown, a personal trainer whom he has known since primary school, in December 2020.

== Tennis career ==
=== 2017 ===
He won three ATP Challenger doubles titles, at the Internazionali dell'Umbria, Gwangju Open and Kobe Challenger.

He was selected in the Japan Davis Cup team in September, being Japan's top-ranked doubles player at that time.

In October, he caused a surprise by winning the Japan Open, his first ATP World Tour event. He and his partner Yasutaka Uchiyama beat Jean-Julien Rojer and Horia Tecău, the world's third-ranked pair, in the quarterfinals and then Jamie Murray and Bruno Soares, the fourth-ranked pair, in the final.

=== 2018 ===
McLachlan played his first Grand Slam tournament at the Australian Open, partnering German Jan-Lennard Struff to reach the semifinals after defeating the top-seeded and world No. 1 pair of Łukasz Kubot and Marcelo Melo. In the semifinals they lost to the seventh-seeded team of Oliver Marach and Mate Pavić, who went on to win the tournament.

McLachlan then teamed with Hugo Nys to reach the finals in Montpellier, where they lost to English brothers Ken and Neal Skupski. They lost in the semifinals of the Delray Beach Open to the eventual winners Jack Sock and Jackson Withrow. After first-round losses at Acapulco (partnered by Nicholas Monroe) and Indian Wells, and a second-round loss in the Irving Classic (the latter two with Julio Peralta), he and Struff teamed up for the first time since the Australian Open to contest the Miami Open. After good wins in the first three rounds, they came up against the Bryan brothers in the semi-finals, and lost to the eventual winners 5–7, 4–6. He then travelled to Houston for the U.S. Clay Court Championships, where he partnered Ryan Harrison for the first time. In a major upset, they lost to the wildcard pair of Dustin Brown and Frances Tiafoe in the first round.

From there it was across to Europe, and the Monte Carlo Masters. Yet another new partner (Santiago González) awaited him, and they went out in the first round to a wildcard pair in local Romain Arneodo and McLachlan's former partner in Hugo Nys. Reunited with Struff for the Hungarian Open, they won their first two matches comfortably before being beaten in three tie-breaks in their semifinal against Andrés Molteni and Matwé Middelkoop. McLachlan went on to Istanbul for his next tournament, partnered again by Monroe, and they were the top seeds. They went all the way to the final, losing in a match tie-break after taking the first set. In Madrid they beat John Isner and Jack Sock in the first round and Ivan Dodig and Rajeev Ram in the second, before losing to Pierre-Hugues Herbert and Nicolas Mahut in the quarter-finals.

McLachlan's last stop before the French Open was in Lyon, where he paired up with Marcin Matkowski for the first time, losing in the first round in a match tie-break. Reunited with Struff at Roland Garros, the pair suffered a surprise defeat at the hands of Marcelo Arévalo and Jamie Cerretani in the first round, losing in three sets. He also played mixed doubles for the first time, his partner being Makoto Ninomiya, but they lost in the first round to second seeds Latisha Chan and Ivan Dodig. Ninomiya would go on to be runner-up in the women's doubles with Eri Hozumi.

For their first grass-court tournament together, McLachlan and Struff went to Stuttgart, where they lost in the first round. They changed partners so that Struff would have a fellow German with him at Halle, and McLachlan teamed up with Japanese No. 1 Kei Nishikori, a very infrequent doubles player. It was not an auspicious start, as they were beaten in straight sets by Marcel Granollers and Robin Haase. McLachlan's last tournament before Wimbledon was at Eastbourne where, teaming up again with Matkowski, they suffered the same result as in Lyon – a first round loss.

At Wimbledon McLachlan and Struff dropped only one set in their first three matches on the way through to the quarter-finals. They lost there in four sets, the three which went against them all being tie-breaks, to Frederik Nielsen and Joe Salisbury. Even with that defeat, they remained the only pair in the whole competition not to have lost a service game. In the mixed doubles McLachlan teamed up with Eri Hozumi. As 14th seeds they had a bye in the first round, then had a walkover in the second, before losing to fourth seeds Jean-Julien Rojer and Demi Schuurs.

McLachlan and Struff then moved on to the German Open, where they lost in the semifinals to Julio Peralta and Horacio Zeballos, and McLachlan then went to Washington, where he and Ivan Dodig had a superb win over Łukasz Kubot and Marcelo Melo in the first round, before losing in a big upset to Denis Kudla and Frances Tiafoe in their quarterfinal. It was the second time, following Houston in February, that Tiafoe had inflicted a defeat on McLachlan.

The two North American Masters 1000 events, in Toronto and Cincinnati, saw McLachlan team up with Matwé Middelkoop. In Toronto, they lost in the second round to Jean-Julien Rojer and Horia Tecău, the latter playing his first tournament in several months after an injury break. Cincinnati also saw a second round defeat, this time to Colombians Juan Sebastián Cabal and Robert Farah.

In his last tournament before the US Open, McLachlan resumed his partnership with Struff at Winston-Salem, but they were knocked out in the first round by eventual runners-up Jamie Cerretani and Leander Paes. In the year's final major event, he and Struff were the 12th seeds in the men's doubles, but were knocked out in the first round by the Italian pair of Matteo Berrettini and Andreas Seppi. In the mixed doubles McLachlan resumed his partnership with Makoto Ninomiya, but they lost in the first round to the eventual runners-up, Alicja Rosolska and Nikola Mektić.

The next event for McLachlan was the Davis Cup tie in Osaka against Bosnia/Herzegovina where, reunited with Yasutaka Uchiyama, they beat Tomislav Brkić and Nerman Fatić in straight sets to seal victory for Japan.

At the end of September, McLachlan won his second title on the ATP Tour at the Shenzhen Open, partnering Joe Salisbury. A week later he successfully defended his Japan Open crown in Tokyo, but this time with regular partner Jan-Lennard Struff, beating Raven Klaasen and Michael Venus in the final. They then lost in the first round of the European Open in Antwerp, beaten 13–11 in a match tie-break by Máximo González and Nicolás Jarry, and McLachlan finished his season when he and Struff went out in the first round of the Paris Masters, beaten 6–3, 6–4, by Dominic Inglot and Franko Škugor.

=== 2019 ===
McLachlan and Struff started the new year in Brisbane, where they easily won their first match, but suffered a big upset defeat in the quarterfinals. From there they headed to Auckland, where they beat Łukasz Kubot and Horacio Zeballos in the first round, Marcus Daniell and Wesley Koolhof in the quarterfinals and the top seeds Oliver Marach and Mate Pavić in the semi-final, requiring two tie-breaks in all three matches. In the final they were up against Raven Klaasen and Michael Venus, and took the first set 6–3. Down 2–4 in the second set, they won four games in a row to take the match and the title. They lost in a tight third set tie-break to Radu Albot and Malek Jaziri in the first round of the Australian Open. Reunited with Yasutaka Uchiyama for the Davis Cup tie against China, they lost to Gong Mao-xin and Zhang Ze in three sets, although Japan won the tie 3–2 to qualify for the finals in Madrid in November. McLachlan and Struff then lost in the first round at Rotterdam.

McLachlan changed partners for the Open 13 in Marseille as Struff didn't attend, teaming up with Matwé Middelkoop to go all the way to the final, where they lost in a match tie-break to Jérémy Chardy and Fabrice Martin. Dubai was the next stop where, reunited with Struff, he again lost in a final, this time to Rajeev Ram and Joe Salisbury. They had their revenge on that pair in their very next match, in the first round at Indian Wells, but it was Venus and Klaasen's turn for revenge in the second round, winning 6–4, 7–6^{(4)}. Struff elected to play singles only in Miami, so McLachlan joined forces with Neal Skupski. They lost in the first round to Radu Albot and Nikoloz Basilashvili.

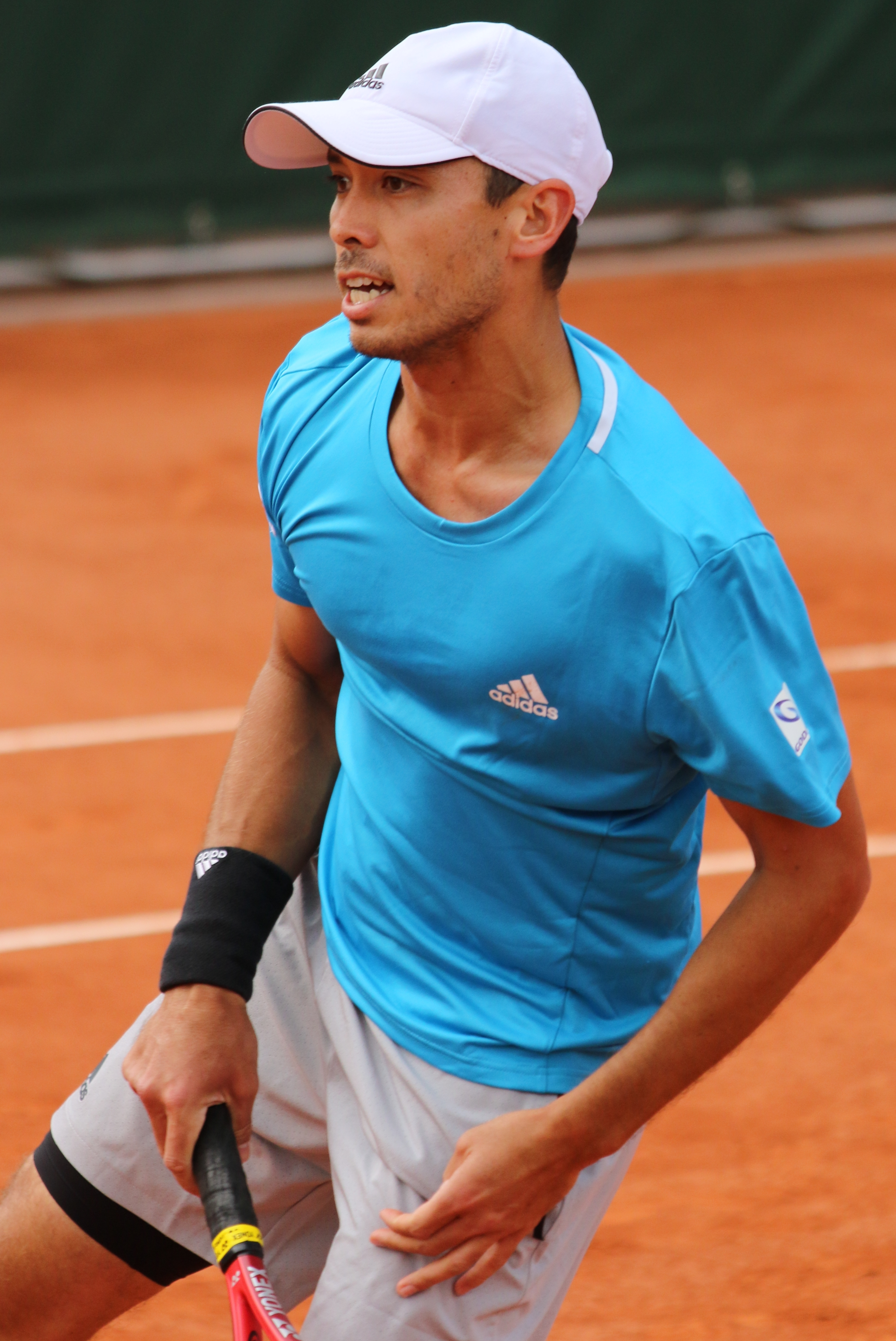
McLachlan at the 2019 French Open

More first round losses followed over the next three months, the streak reaching eight with his and Struff's exit from Roland-Garros, where they had been seeded 15th, at the hands of eventual runners-up Jérémy Chardy and Fabrice Martin. He also played mixed doubles at the French Open, teaming up again with his partner from Wimbledon, Eri Hozumi, but they lost in a first round match tie-break to María José Martínez Sánchez and Neal Skupski.

He broke the losing streak in resounding fashion by winning the Surbiton Trophy with Marcel Granollers to start the grass season in style. Back with Struff in Germany, they lost to Łukasz Kubot and Marcelo Melo in the semifinals at Halle before McLachlan headed to Eastbourne where, this time with Freddie Nielsen, they lost to Fabrice Martin and Édouard Roger-Vasselin in the quarterfinals. Then it was on to Wimbledon, where McLachlan and Struff met Kubot and Melo, now the top seeds, in the first round. It was their third match in two months, with the same result as the others, but it was a really high-class encounter over four sets, lasting just under three hours. McLachlan's poor results in mixed doubles continued, as he and Miyu Kato lost in the first round to Hsieh Su-wei and Hsieh Cheng-peng.

McLachlan had a new partner for his next three tournaments in the US, teaming up with Australian John-Patrick Smith. They lost in the semifinals at Newport to Marcelo Arévalo and Miguel Ángel Reyes-Varela, in the quarterfinals in Atlanta and in the first round at Los Cabos. McLachlan's next tournament was in Vancouver, where he started a partnership with Luke Bambridge that has continued for every non-Japanese team match since. They won their first match, but lost the quarterfinal to Treat Huey and Adil Shamasdin in two titanic tie-breaks, 7–5, 6–7^{(11)}, 12–14.

They also lost in the quarterfinals at both Winston-Salem and the US Open, the latter to top seeds and defending champions Juan Sebastián Cabal and Robert Farah. Their next tournament was in Metz, where they lost to eventual champions Struff and Robert Lindstedt in the first round. Again they were on the wrong end of a huge tie-break, losing 4–6, 6–7^{(15)} on Struff and Lindstedt's fifth match point. A run of first and second round losses continued for the next month, their last event together for 2019 being in Vienna, where they had to qualify before eventually losing in the quarterfinals to Rajeev Ram and Joe Salisbury, the latter going on to defend the title he had won the previous year with Neal Skupski.

McLachlan's last event of the 2019 season was the Davis Cup finals in Madrid, where he was reunited with Yasutaka Uchiyama to represent Japan. They lost two very close matches, beaten 6–7^{(4)}, 6–4, 7–5 by the French pair of Pierre-Hugues Herbert and Nicolas Mahut, and 7–6^{(5)}, 7–6^{(4)} by Janko Tipsarević and Viktor Troicki of Serbia.

=== 2020 ===
With just a month's break after the Davis Cup, McLachlan resumed his career in the 2020 ATP Cup in Perth. Japan was eliminated in the round-robin phase, McLachlan's contributions being a win over Uruguay and a loss to Georgia with Toshihide Matsui, and a loss with Go Soeda to Pablo Carreño Busta and Rafael Nadal of Spain, the eventual group and tournament winners.

McLachlan and Bambridge made a winning start to the year in Auckland, taking their first title together by defeating Marcus Daniell and Philipp Oswald in the final. That form didn't continue in the Australian Open, where they lost in the first round to 10th seeds Mate Pavić and Bruno Soares. They also lost early in two events in the United States before going all the way to the final in Delray Beach, where they lost to Bob and Mike Bryan in a match tie-break. Acapulco saw another first-round loss, this time to top seeds Cabal and Farah.

McLachlan had only one more match before the COVID-19 coronavirus halted tennis. This was a Davis Cup match against Ecuador in Miki, where he and Uchiyama were beaten by Gonzalo Escobar and Diego Hidalgo. Ecuador won the tie 3–0 to qualify for the finals in Madrid in November (but which were subsequently postponed), with Japan returning to World Group I, where they are scheduled to eventually play away to Pakistan.

McLachlan and Bambridge had a mixture of first and second-round losses once the tour resumed in September, including a bad first-round loss in the US Open, their first tournament back. They ended their partnership after losing in the first round at the French Open to Wesley Koolhof and Nikola Mektić, the runners-up in the US Open. McLachlan and Franko Škugor reached the semifinals in St Petersburg, losing to eventual champions Jürgen Melzer and Édouard Roger-Vasselin.

McLachlan teamed up with Raven Klaasen in Cologne, becoming champions in their first tournament together when they defeated French Open title-holders Kevin Krawietz and Andreas Mies in straight sets in the final. McLachlan rejoined Skugor in Nur-Sultan, losing in the semifinals, before he and Klaasen were upset in the first round of the Paris Masters by Taylor Fritz and Casper Ruud.

=== 2024: Retirement ===
McLachlan announced his retirement from professional tennis in April 2024.

== ATP career finals ==
=== Doubles: 13 (7 titles, 6 runner-ups) ===
Legend Grand Slam tournaments (0–0) ATP World Tour Finals (0–0) ATP World Tour Masters 1000 (0–0) ATP World Tour 500 Series (3–1) ATP World Tour 250 Series (4–5)	Finals by surface Hard (7–5) Clay (0–1) Grass (0–0)	Finals by setting Outdoor (5–2) Indoor (2–3)

Result	W–L	Date	Tournament	Tier	Surface	Partner	Opponents	Score
Win	1–0	Oct 2017	Japan Open	500 Series	Hard	(Japan) Yasutaka Uchiyama	(United Kingdom) Jamie Murray (Brazil) Bruno Soares	6–4, 7–6^{(7–1)}
Loss	1–1	Feb 2018	Open Sud de France	250 Series	Hard (i)	(France) Hugo Nys	(United Kingdom) Ken Skupski (United Kingdom) Neal Skupski	6–7^{(2–7)}, 4–6
Loss	1–2	May 2018	Istanbul Open, Turkey	250 Series	Clay	(United States) Nicholas Monroe	(United Kingdom) Dominic Inglot (Sweden) Robert Lindstedt	3–6, 6–3, [8–10]
Win	2–2	Sep 2018	Shenzhen Open, China	250 Series	Hard	(United Kingdom) Joe Salisbury	(Sweden) Robert Lindstedt (United States) Rajeev Ram	7–6^{(7–5)}, 7–6^{(7–4)}
Win	3–2	Oct 2018	Japan Open (2)	500 Series	Hard (i)	(Germany) Jan-Lennard Struff	(South Africa) Raven Klaasen (New Zealand) Michael Venus	6–4, 7–5
Win	4–2	Jan 2019	Auckland Open, New Zealand	250 Series	Hard	(Germany) Jan-Lennard Struff	(South Africa) Raven Klaasen (New Zealand) Michael Venus	6–3, 6–4
Loss	4–3	Feb 2019	Open 13, France	250 Series	Hard (i)	(Netherlands) Matwé Middelkoop	(France) Jérémy Chardy (France) Fabrice Martin	3–6, 7–6^{(7–4)}, [3–10]
Loss	4–4	Mar 2019	Dubai Tennis Championships, United Arab Emirates	500 Series	Hard	(Germany) Jan-Lennard Struff	(United States) Rajeev Ram (United Kingdom) Joe Salisbury	6–7^{(4–7)}, 3–6
Win	5–4	Jan 2020	Auckland Open, New Zealand (2)	250 Series	Hard	(United Kingdom) Luke Bambridge	(New Zealand) Marcus Daniell (Austria) Philipp Oswald	7–6^{(7–3)}, 6–3
Loss	5–5	Feb 2020	Delray Beach Open, United States	250 Series	Hard	(United Kingdom) Luke Bambridge	(United States) Bob Bryan (United States) Mike Bryan	6–3, 5–7, [5–10]
Win	6–5	Oct 2020	Cologne Championship, Germany	250 Series	Hard (i)	(South Africa) Raven Klaasen	(Germany) Kevin Krawietz (Germany) Andreas Mies	6–2, 6–4
Win	7–5	Jul 2021	Washington Open, United States	500 Series	Hard	(South Africa) Raven Klaasen	(United Kingdom) Neal Skupski (New Zealand) Michael Venus	7–6^{(7–4)}, 6–4
Loss	7–6	Feb 2022	Open 13, France	250 Series	Hard (i)	(South Africa) Raven Klaasen	(Ukraine) Denys Molchanov (Russia) Andrey Rublev	6–4, 5–7, [7–10]

== ATP Challenger and ITF Futures finals ==
=== Singles: 1 (1 runner-up) ===
Legend
ATP Challengers (0–0)
ITF Futures (0–1)

Result	W–L	Date	Tournament	Tier	Surface	Opponent	Score
Loss	0–1	Nov 2014	Pensacola, United States	Futures	Clay	(France) Théo Fournerie	2–6, 5–7

=== Doubles: 33 (21 titles, 12 runners-up) ===
Legend
ATP Challengers (8–6)
ITF Futures (13–6)

Result	W–L	Date	Tournament	Tier	Surface	Partner	Opponents	Score
Loss	0–1	Jun 2014	Akishima, Japan	Futures	Clay	(Japan) Keisuke Watanuki	(Japan) Sho Katayama (Japan) Arata Onozawa	7–6^{(7–4)}, 3–6, [4–10]
Loss	0–2	Aug 2014	Rosarito, Mexico	Futures	Hard	(Australia) Jarryd Chaplin	(Mexico) Daniel Garza (Mexico) Antonio Ruiz-Rosales	6–0, retired
Win	1–2	Nov 2014	Pensacola, United States	Futures	Clay	(United States) Justin S. Shane	(United Kingdom) Julian Cash (France) Florian Lakat	7–6^{(7–2)}, 6–2
Loss	1–3	Feb 2015	Colombo, Sri Lanka	Futures	Clay	(United States) Andre Dome	(Serbia) Arsenije Zlatanović (Serbia) Miljan Zekić	2–6, 4–6
Loss	1–4	Apr 2015	Tsukuba, Japan	Futures	Hard	(Australia) Jarryd Chaplin	(Japan) Shintaro Imai (Japan) Takuto Niki	2–6, 4–6
Win	2–4	May 2015	Orange Park, United States	Futures	Hard	(United States) Jean-Yves Aubone	(Argentina) Maximiliano Estévez (Argentina) Facundo Mena	6–4, 6–4
Win	3–4	Jun 2015	Karuizawa, Japan	Futures	Clay	(Japan) Keisuke Watanuki	(Japan) Sho Katayama (Japan) Arata Onozawa	6–1, 3–6, [10–3]
Win	4–4	Jun 2015	Akishima, Japan	Futures	Clay	(Japan) Yuya Kibi	(Japan) Arata Onozawa (Japan) Keisuke Watanuki	6–3, 6–2
Win	5–4	Aug 2015	Ashkelon, Israel	Futures	Hard	(Australia) Jarryd Chaplin	(France) Jonathan Kanar (France) Elie Rousset	6–2, 4–6, [10–8]
Win	6–4	Sep 2015	Kiryat Gat, Israel	Futures	Hard	(Australia) Jarryd Chaplin	(Israel) Mor Bulis (Israel) Edan Leshem	7–6^{(7–2)}, 6–2
Win	7–4	Sep 2015	Meitar, Israel	Futures	Hard	(Australia) Jarryd Chaplin	(Belgium) Michael Geerts (Italy) Stefano Napolitano	7–6^{(7–5)}, 6–3
Win	8–4	Feb 2016	Baku, Azerbaijan	Futures	Carpet (i)	(Latvia) Miķelis Lībietis	(Uzbekistan) Sanjar Fayziev (Kazakhstan) Timur Khabibulin	7–6^{(7–2)}, 6–7^{(2–7)}, [10–6]
Win	9–4	Feb 2016	Tel Aviv, Israel	Futures	Hard	(Latvia) Miķelis Lībietis	(United States) Alexios Halebian (United States) Ryan Lipman	3–6, 7–6^{(7–3)}, [12–10]
Loss	9–5	Mar 2016	Nishi-Tama, Japan	Futures	Hard	(Chinese Taipei) Huang Liang-chi	(Japan) Yuya Kibi (Japan) Toshihide Matsui	3–6, 1–6
Win	10–5	Apr 2016	Tsukuba, Japan	Futures	Hard	(New Zealand) Finn Tearney	(Japan) Yuichi Ito (Japan) Sho Katayama	3–6, 6–4, [10–4]
Win	11–5	May 2016	Ramat Gan, Israel	Futures	Hard	(Australia) Jarryd Chaplin	(United States) Nicolas Meister (United States) Hunter Reese	7–5, 7–6^{(7–1)}
Win	12–5	Jun 2016	Kiryat Shmona, Israel	Futures	Hard	(Australia) Jarryd Chaplin	(United States) Cameron Silverman (United States) Quinton Vega	6–2, 6–3
Win	13–5	Jun 2016	Akko, Israel	Futures	Hard	(Australia) Jarryd Chaplin	(United States) Nick Chappell (Germany) Milen Ianakiev	2–6, 6–3, [10–5]
Loss	13–6	Mar 2016	Kelowna, Canada	Futures	Hard	(Australia) Jarryd Chaplin	(United States) John Paul Fruttero (Chinese Taipei) Jason Jung	4–6, 6–7^{(4–7)}
Loss	0–1	Aug 2016	Aptos, United States	Challenger	Hard	(United States) Mackenzie McDonald	(South Africa) Nicolaas Schultz (South Africa) Tucker Vorster	7–6^{(7–5)}, 3–6, [8–10]
Loss	0–2	Oct 2016	Monterrey, Mexico	Challenger	Hard	(Australia) Jarryd Chaplin	(United States) Evan King (United States) Denis Kudla	7–6^{(7–4)}, 4–6, [2–10]
Win	1–2	Jun 2017	Todi, Italy	Challenger	Clay	(Australia) Steven de Waard	(Croatia) Marin Draganja (Croatia) Tomislav Draganja	6–7^{(7–9)}, 6–4, [10–7]
Loss	1–3	Jul 2017	Cortina d'Ampezzo, Italy	Challenger	Clay	(Australia) Steven de Waard	(Argentina) Guido Andreozzi (Austria) Gerald Melzer	2–6, 6–7^{(4–7)}
Win	2–3	Sep 2017	Gwangju, South Korea	Challenger	Hard	(Chinese Taipei) Chen Ti	(Australia) Jarryd Chaplin (Australia) Luke Saville	2–6, 7–6^{(7–1)}, [10–1]
Loss	2–4	Oct 2017	Ho Chi Minh City, Vietnam	Challenger	Hard	(Japan) Go Soeda	(India) Saketh Myneni (India) Vijay Sundar Prashanth	6–7^{(3–7)}, 6–7^{(5–7)}
Win	3–4	Nov 2017	Kobe, Japan	Challenger	Hard (i)	(Japan) Yasutaka Uchiyama	(India) Jeevan Nedunchezhiyan (Indonesia) Christopher Rungkat	4–6, 6–3, [10–8]
Win	4–4	Jun 2019	Surbiton, United Kingdom	Challenger	Grass	(Spain) Marcel Granollers	(South Korea) Kwon Soon-woo (India) Ramkumar Ramanathan	4–6, 6–3, [10–2]
Loss	4–5	Apr 2022	Barletta, Italy	Challenger	Clay	(Poland) Szymon Walków	Evgeny Karlovskiy; Evgenii Tiurnev	3–6, 4–6
Win	5–5	Aug 2022	Chicago, United States	Challenger	Hard	(Sweden) André Göransson	(United States) Evan King (United States) Mitchell Krueger	6–4, 6–7^{(3–7)}, [10–5]
Win	6–5	Aug 2022	Vancouver, Canada	Challenger	Hard	(Sweden) André Göransson	(Philippines) Treat Huey (Australia) John-Patrick Smith	6–7^{(4–7)}, 7–6^{(9–7)}, [11–9]
Win	7–5	Jan 2023	Canberra, Australia	Challenger	Hard	(Sweden) André Göransson	(Australia) Andrew Harris (Australia) John-Patrick Smith	6–3, 5–7, [10–5]
Win	8–5	Feb 2023	Monterrey, Mexico	Challenger	Hard	(Sweden) André Göransson	(Venezuela) Luis David Martínez (Colombia) Cristian Rodríguez	6–3, 6–4
Loss	8–6	Mar 2023	Puerto Vallarta, Mexico	Challenger	Hard	(Sweden) André Göransson	(United States) Robert Galloway (Mexico) Miguel Ángel Reyes-Varela	0–3, retired

== Davis Cup (7) ==
Legend Group membership World Group (1–6) Group I (0) Group II (0) Group III (0) Group IV (0)	Results by surface Hard (1–6) Grass (0–0) Clay (0–0) Carpet (0–0)	Results by setting Outdoors (1–2) Indoors (0–4)

- ▲ ▼ indicates the outcome of the Davis Cup match followed by the score, date, place of event, the zonal classification and its phase, and the court surface.

Rubber outcome	No.	Rubber	Match type (partner if any)	Opponent nation	Opponent player(s)	Score
▲3–1; 15–17 September 2017; Utsubo Tennis Center, Osaka, Japan; World Group Play-off, Play-off round; hard surface
Defeat	1.	III	Doubles (with Yasutaka Uchiyama)	Brazil	Marcelo Melo / Bruno Soares	6–7^{(2–7)}, 4–6, 2–6
▼1–3; 2–4 February 2018; Morioka Takaya Arena, Morioka, Japan; World Group first round; hard (i) surface
Defeat	2.	III	Doubles (with Yasutaka Uchiyama)	Italy	Simone Bolelli / Fabio Fognini	5–7, 7–6^{(7–4)}, 6–7^{(3–7)}, 5–7
▲4–0; 14–16 September 2018; ITC Utsubo Tennis Center, Osaka, Japan; World Group Play-off, Play-off round; hard surface
Victory	1.	III	Doubles (with Yasutaka Uchiyama)	Bosnia and Herzegovina	Tomislav Brkić / Nerman Fatić	6–2, 6–4, 6–4
▲3–2; 1–2 February 2019; Guangdong Olympic Tennis Centre, Guangzhou, China; qualifying round; hard surface
Defeat	3.	III	Doubles (with Yasutaka Uchiyama)	China	Gong Maoxin / Zhang Ze	7–5, 5–7, 4–6
▼1–2; 19 November 2019; Caja Mágica, Madrid, Spain; Finals Group A, round robin, first round; hard (i) surface
Defeat	4.	III	Doubles (with Yasutaka Uchiyama)	France	Pierre-Hugues Herbert / Nicolas Mahut	7–6^{(7–4)}, 4–6, 5–7
▼0–3; 20 November 2019; Caja Mágica, Madrid, Spain; Finals Group A, round robin, second round; hard (i) surface
Defeat	5.	III	Doubles (with Yasutaka Uchiyama)	Serbia	Janko Tipsarević / Viktor Troicki	6–7^{(5–7)}, 6–7^{(4–7)}
▼0–3; 6–7 March 2020; Bourbon Beans Dome, Miki, Japan; qualifying round; hard (i) surface
Defeat	6.	III	Doubles (with Yasutaka Uchiyama)	Ecuador	Gonzalo Escobar / Diego Hidalgo	6–7^{(3–7)}, 3–6

== Doubles performance timeline ==
Key
W	F	SF	QF	#R	RR	Q#	DNQ	A	NH

(W) winner; (F) finalist; (SF) semifinalist; (QF) quarterfinalist; (#R) rounds 4, 3, 2, 1; (RR) round-robin stage; (Q#) qualification round; (DNQ) did not qualify; (A) absent; (NH) not held; (SR) strike rate (events won / competed); (W–L) win–loss record.

=== Men's doubles ===
Current through the 2024 Australian Open.

	New Zealand				Japan								
Tournament	2014	2015	2016	2017	2018	2019	2020	2021	2022	2023	2024	SR	W–L
Grand Slam tournaments
Australian Open	A	A	A	A	SF	1R	1R	1R	3R	2R	1R	0 / 7	7–7
French Open	A	A	A	A	1R	1R	1R	2R	1R	1R	A	0 / 6	1–6
Wimbledon	A	A	A	A	QF	1R	NH	QF	1R	1R	A	0 / 5	6–5
US Open	A	A	A	A	1R	QF	1R	2R	1R	2R	A	0 / 6	5–6
Win–loss	0–0	0–0	0–0	0–0	7–4	3–4	0–3	5–4	2–4	2–4	0–1	0 / 24	19–24
ATP World Tour Masters 1000
Indian Wells Masters	A	A	A	A	1R	2R	NH	1R	1R	A	A	0 / 4	1–4
Miami Open	A	A	A	A	SF	1R	NH	1R	1R	A	A	0 / 4	3–4
Monte-Carlo Masters	A	A	A	A	1R	1R	NH	QF	A	A	A	0 / 3	2–3
Madrid Open	A	A	A	A	QF	1R	NH	2R	1R	A	A	0 / 4	3–4
Italian Open	A	A	A	A	A	1R	A	2R	2R	A	A	0 / 3	2–3
Canadian Open	A	A	A	A	2R	A	NH	1R	A	A	A	0 / 2	1–2
Cincinnati Masters	A	A	A	A	2R	A	A	1R	A	A	A	0 / 2	1–2
Shanghai Masters	A	A	A	A	2R	A	NH			A	A	0 / 1	1–1
Paris Masters	A	A	A	A	1R	A	1R	1R	A	A	A	0 / 3	0–3
Win–loss	0–0	0–0	0–0	0–0	8–8	1–5	0–1	4–8	1–4	0–0	0–0	0 / 26	14–26
National representation
Davis Cup	A	A	A	PO	1R	RR	PO	A	PO	WG1	A	0 / 4	3–7
ATP Cup	Not Held						RR	RR	A	Not Held		0 / 2	2–3
Career statistics
Tournaments	0	0	0	2	30	20	12	31	27	16	2	140	
Titles	0	0	0	1	2	1	2	1	0	0	0	7	
Finals	0	0	0	1	4	3	3	1	1	0	0	13	
Overall win–loss	0–0	0–0	0–0	5–2	36–29	24–29	16–13	23–11	13–28	13–16	0–2	130–150	
Year-end ranking	758	397	198	73	18	44	48	37	79	79	—	46.43%	

=== Mixed doubles ===
Although the US and French Opens took place in 2020, mixed doubles were not included in either event due to COVID-19.

Tournament	2018	2019	2020	2021	2022	SR	W–L
Grand Slam tournaments
Australian Open	A	1R	A	A	QF	0 / 2	2–2
French Open	1R	1R	NH	A	2R	0 / 3	1–3
Wimbledon	3R	1R	NH	A	1R	0 / 3	0–3
US Open	1R	A	NH	2R	A	0 / 2	1–2
Win–loss	0–3	0–3	0–0	1–1	3–3	0 / 10	4–10
