= 2013 Distalnet Tennis Cup =

- Date: 1 – 7 July
- Edition: 7th
- Surface: Clay
- Location: Todi, Italy

Champions

Singles
- (Spain) Pere Riba

Doubles
- (Colombia) Santiago Giraldo / (Colombia) Cristian Rodríguez
← 2012 ·	Internazionali di Tennis dell'Umbria	· 2014 →

The 2013 Distalnet Tennis Cup was a professional tennis tournament played on clay courts. It was the seventh edition of the tournament which was part of the 2013 ATP Challenger Tour. It took place in Todi, Italy between 1 and 7 July 2013.

== Singles main draw entrants ==
=== Seeds ===
Country	Player	Rank^{1}	Seed
ESP	Albert Ramos	62	1
ITA	Paolo Lorenzi	73	2
COL	Santiago Giraldo	91	3
ARG	Martín Alund	101	4
POR	João Sousa	106	5
SVK	Andrej Martin	149	6
ARG	Renzo Olivo	195	7
ITA	Gianluca Naso	207	8

- ^{1} Rankings are as of June 24, 2013.

=== Other entrants ===
The following players received wildcards into the singles main draw:

- (Italy) Andrea Arnaboldi
- (Italy) Marco Cecchinato
- (Italy) Thomas Fabbiano
- (Spain) Albert Ramos

The following players received entry using a protected ranking:

- (Spain) Pere Riba

The following players received entry from the qualifying draw:

- (Germany) Richard Becker
- (Italy) Alberto Brizzi
- (Croatia) Mate Delić
- (Italy) Adelchi Virgili

== Champions ==
=== Singles ===
- (Spain) Pere Riba def. (Colombia) Santiago Giraldo 7–6^{(7–5)}, 2–6, 7–6^{(8–6)}

=== Doubles ===
- (Colombia) Santiago Giraldo / (Colombia) Cristian Rodríguez def. (Italy) Andrea Arnaboldi / (Italy) Gianluca Naso 4–6, 7–6^{(7–2)}, [10–3]
