= 2014 Distal & ITR Group Tennis Cup and the Astra Italy Tennis Cup =

2014 Distal & ITR Group Tennis Cup and Astra Italy Tennis Cup
- Date: 30 June – 6 July
- Edition: 8th (men); 5th (women)
- Category: ATP Challenger Tour (men); ITF Women's Circuit (women)
- Prize money: €35,000+H (men) $10,000 (women)
- Surface: Clay
- Location: Todi, Italy

Champions

Men's singles
- (Slovenia) Aljaž Bedene

Women's singles
- (Italy) Alice Savoretti

Men's doubles
- (Argentina) Guillermo Durán / (Argentina) Máximo González

Women's doubles
- (Italy) Deborah Chiesa / (Italy) Beatrice Lombardo
← 2013 ·	Distal & ITR Group Tennis Cup	· 2015 →
← 2013 ·	Astra Italy Tennis Cup	· 2015 →

The 2014 Distal & ITR Group Tennis Cup and the Astra Italy Tennis Cup were professional tennis tournaments played on clay courts. It was the 8th edition of the men's tournament which was part of the 2014 ATP Challenger Tour, offering a total of €35,000+H in prize money, and fifth edition of the women's tournament, which was part of the 2014 ITF Women's Circuit, offering a total of $10,000 in prize money. The two events took place together at the Tennis Club Todi in Todi, Italy, on 30 June – 6 July 2014.

== Men's singles entrants ==
=== Seeds ===
Country	Player	Rank^{1}	Seed
AUT	Andreas Haider-Maurer	95	1
ARG	Máximo González	116	2
ITA	Filippo Volandri	117	3
SVK	Norbert Gomboš	128	4
SLO	Aljaž Bedene	140	5
SVK	Andrej Martin	162	6
ITA	Thomas Fabbiano	170	7
ITA	Andrea Arnaboldi	171	8

- ^{1} Rankings as of 23 June 2014

=== Other entrants ===
The following players received wildcards into the singles main draw:

- (Italy) Alessandro Giannessi
- (Italy) Roberto Marcora
- (Italy) Antonio Massara
- (Italy) Stefano Travaglia

The following players received entry from the qualifying draw:

- (Italy) Matteo Donati
- (Argentina) Guillermo Durán
- (Austria) Maximilian Neuchrist
- (Argentina) Renzo Olivo

== Women's singles entrants ==
=== Seeds ===
Country	Player	Rank^{1}	Seed
SWE	Rebecca Peterson	244	1
ITA	Corinna Dentoni	327	2
ITA	Alice Balducci	373	3
SUI	Lisa Sabino	518	4
USA	Lauren Embree	531	5
DOM	Francesca Segarelli	586	6
SUI	Tess Sugnaux	605	7
ITA	Angelica Moratelli	627	8

- ^{1} Rankings as of 23 June 2014

=== Other entrants ===
The following players received wildcards into the singles main draw:

- (United States) Zoe Adeline Katz
- (Italy) Tatiana Pieri
- (Italy) Beatrice Torelli
- (United States) Madison Westby

The following players received entry from the qualifying draw:

- (Argentina) Camila Aguirri
- (Italy) Lisa Bastianello
- (Italy) Martina Caciotti
- (Latvia) Laura Gulbe
- (Italy) Beatrice Lombardo
- (India) Sri Vaishnavi Peddi Reddy
- (Bosnia and Herzegovina) Jelena Simić
- (Italy) Anna Turati

The following player received entry as a lucky loser:

- (Italy) Alessandra Gisonna

== Champions ==
=== Men's singles ===
- (Slovenia) Aljaž Bedene def. (Hungary) Márton Fucsovics 2–6, 7–6^{(7–4)}, 6–4

=== Women's singles ===
- (Italy) Alice Savoretti def. (United States) Lauren Embree 6–3, 6–3

=== Men's doubles ===
- (Argentina) Guillermo Durán / (Argentina) Máximo González def. (Italy) Riccardo Ghedin / (Germany) Claudio Grassi 6–1, 3–6, [10–7]

=== Women's doubles ===
- (Italy) Deborah Chiesa / (Italy) Beatrice Lombardo def. (Italy) Federica Di Sarra / (Italy) Alice Savoretti 6–3, 3–6, [10–8]
