= Steven de Waard =

Australian tennis player

- Country (sports): Australia
- Residence: Melbourne, Australia
- Born: 5 May 1991 (age 34) Brisbane, Australia
- Height: 1.80 m (5 ft 11 in)
- Plays: Right-handed (two-handed backhand)
- Coach: Gary Stickler
- Prize money: $50,704

Singles
- Career record: 0–0
- Career titles: 0
- Highest ranking: No. 707 (14 November 2016)

Doubles
- Career record: 0–0
- Career titles: 0; 1 Challenger, 13 Futures
- Highest ranking: No. 124 (17 July 2017)

Steven de Waard (born 5 May 1991) is an Australian tennis player.

De Waard has a career high ATP singles ranking of No. 707 achieved on 14 November 2016 and a career high doubles ranking of No. 124 achieved on 17 July 2017.

De Waard has won 1 ATP Challenger doubles title at the 2017 Internazionali di Tennis dell'Umbria.

== Tour finals ==
Legend
Grand Slam (0)
ATP Masters Series (0)
ATP Tour (0)
Challengers (1)

=== Doubles ===
Result	Date	Category	Tournament	Surface	Partner	Opponents	Score
Loss	Jul 2016	Tampere, Finland	Challenger	Clay	(Germany) Andreas Mies	(Spain) David Pérez Sanz (United States) Max Schnur	4–6, 4–6
Winner	23 June 2017	Challenger	Todi, Italy	Clay	(New Zealand) Ben McLachlan	(Croatia) Marin Draganja (Croatia) Tomislav Draganja	6–7^{(7–9)}, 6–4, [10–7]
