= Nicolás Kicker =

Argentine tennis player

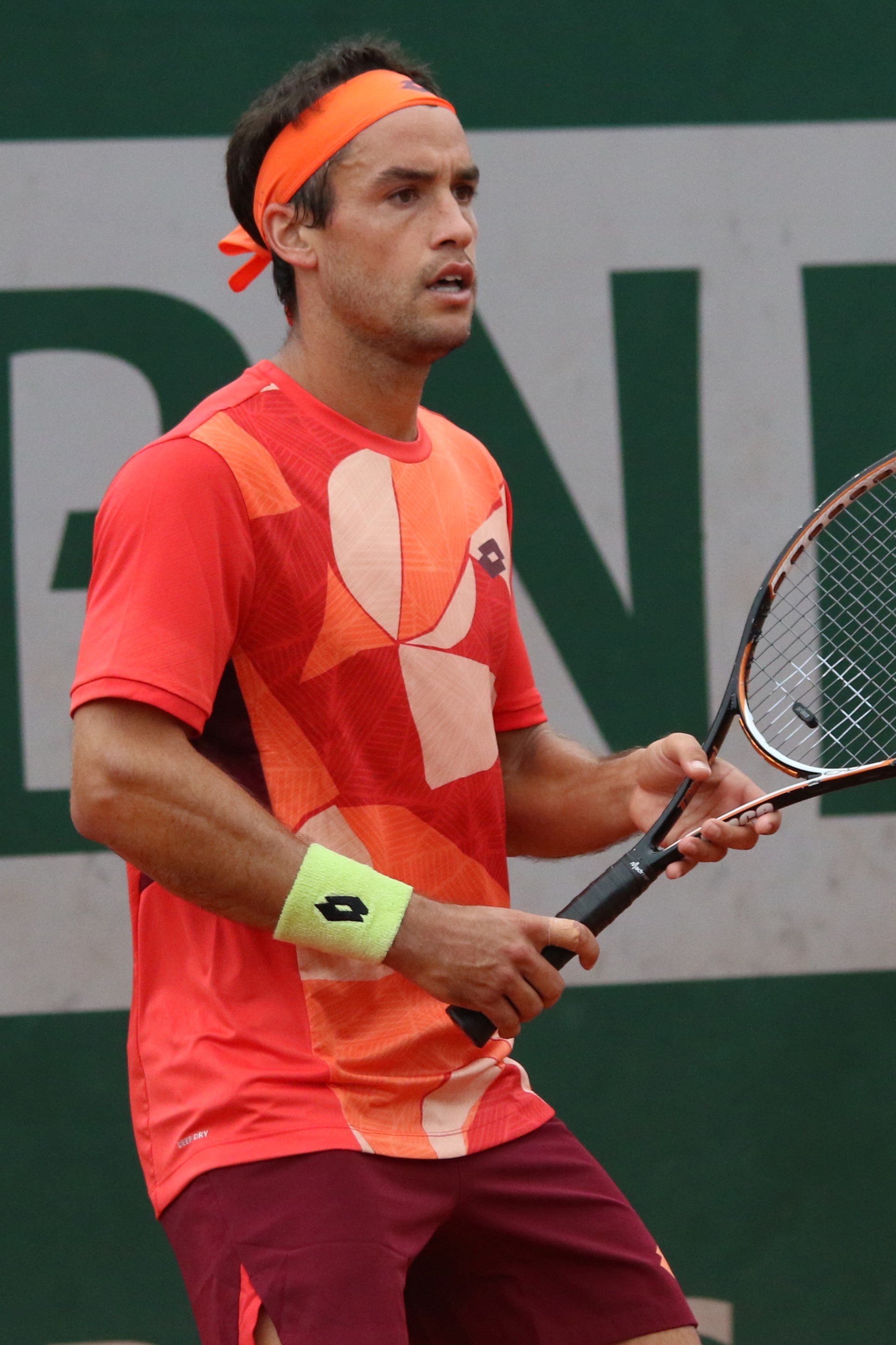
- Kicker at the 2023 French Open
- Country (sports): Argentina
- Residence: Merlo, Argentina
- Born: 16 August 1992 (age 34) Merlo, Argentina
- Height: 5 ft 10 in (1.77 m)
- Turned pro: 2009
- Plays: Right-handed (one-handed backhand)
- Coach: Juan Pablo Gandara
- Prize money: US $1,251,333

Singles
- Career record: 19–29
- Career titles: 0
- Highest ranking: No. 78 (12 June 2017)
- Current ranking: No. 322 (13 July 2026)

Grand Slam singles results
- Australian Open: 3R (2018)
- French Open: 2R (2017)
- Wimbledon: 1R (2017)
- US Open: 1R (2017)

Doubles
- Career record: 4–8
- Career titles: 0
- Highest ranking: No. 215 (9 May 2016)
- Current ranking: No. 264 (13 July 2026)

Grand Slam doubles results
- Wimbledon: 1R (2017)
- Last updated on: 15 July 2026.

Nicolás Kicker (Spanish pronunciation: [nikoˈlas ˈkikeɾ], born 16 August 1992 in Merlo) is an Argentine professional tennis player. He has a career-high ATP singles ranking of world No. 78 achieved on 12 June 2017 and a doubles ranking of No. 215, reached on 9 May 2016.

His best career result is reaching a major third round in singles, at the 2018 Australian Open.

Kicker plays mainly on the ATP Challenger Tour, where he has won four titles in singles and two in doubles. He also earned 21 titles combined on the ITF Men's Tour, 14 in singles and seven in doubles.

== Career ==
In 2018, Kicker was suspended for six years and fined $25,000 for committing match-fixing offences under the Tennis Anti-Corruption Program. He was banned from professional tennis until January 2021.

Kicker returned to the Tour at the 2021 Córdoba Open with a wildcard.

== ATP Tour finals ==
=== Doubles: 1 (runner-up) ===
Legend Grand Slam (–) ATP 1000 (–) ATP 500 (–) ATP 250 (0–1)	Finals by surface Hard (–) Clay (0–1) Grass (–)	Finals by setting Outdoor (0–1) Indoor (–)

Result	W–L	Date	Tournament	Tier	Surface	Partner	Opponents	Score
Loss	0–1	Feb 2026	Argentina Open, Argentina	ATP 250	Clay	(Argentina) Andrea Collarini	(Brazil) Orlando Luz (Brazil) Rafael Matos	5–7, 3–6

== ATP Challenger Tour finals ==
=== Singles: 13 (4 titles, 9 runner-ups) ===
Legend ATP Challenger Tour (4–9)	Finals by surface Hard (0–1) Clay (4–8)

Result	W–L	Date	Tournament	Tier	Surface	Opponent	Score
Loss	0–1	Jul 2015	Todi Tennis Cup, Italy	Challenger	Clay	(United Kingdom) Aljaž Bedene	6–7^{(3–7)}, 4–6
Loss	0–2	Jul 2015	Biella Challenger, Italy	Challenger	Clay	(Slovakia) Andrej Martin	4–6, 2–6
Loss	0–3	Feb 2016	Milex Open, Dominican Republic	Challenger	Clay	(Argentina) Guido Andreozzi	0–6, 4–6
Win	1–3	Jun 2016	Perugia Cup, Italy	Challenger	Clay	(Slovenia) Blaž Rola	2–6, 6–3, 6–0
Loss	1–4	Aug 2016	Adriatic Challenger, Italy	Challenger	Clay	(Brazil) João Souza	4–6, 7–6^{(14–12)}, 2–6
Win	2–4	Nov 2016	Challenger de Guayaquil, Ecuador	Challenger	Clay	(Belgium) Arthur De Greef	6–3, 6–2
Win	3–4	Oct 2017	Copa Fila, Argentina	Challenger	Clay	(Argentina) Horacio Zeballos	6–7^{(5–7)}, 6–0, 7–5
Loss	3–5	Jul 2021	Tampere Open, Finland	Challenger	Clay	(Czech Republic) Jiří Lehečka	7–5, 4–6, 3–6
Loss	3–6	Jul 2022	Internazionali Città di Todi, Italy	Challenger	Clay	(Argentina) Pedro Cachín	4–6, 4–6
Win	4–6	Sep 2022	Challenger de Villa María, Argentina	Challenger	Clay	(Argentina) Mariano Navone	7–5, 6–3
Loss	4–7	Nov 2022	Challenger de Temuco, Chile	Challenger	Hard	(Argentina) Guido Andreozzi	6–4, 4–6, 2–6
Loss	4–8	Mar 2025	Challenger Concepción, Chile	Challenger	Clay	(United States) Emilio Nava	1–6, 6–7^{(3–7)}
Loss	4–9	Aug 2026	Internazionali Città di Todi, Italy	Challenger	Clay	(Czech Republic) Maxim Mrva	2–6, 2–6

=== Doubles: 3 (2 titles, 1 runner-up) ===
Legend ATP Challenger Tour (2–1)

Result	W–L	Date	Tournament	Tier	Surface	Partner	Opponents	Score
Win	1–0	Apr 2016	Sarasota Open, US	Challenger	Clay (green)	(Argentina) Facundo Argüello	(El Salvador) Marcelo Arévalo (Peru) Sergio Galdós	4–6, 6–4, [10–6]
Win	2–0	Apr 2023	Tallahassee Challenger, US	Challenger	Clay (green)	(Argentina) Federico Agustín Gómez	(United States) William Blumberg (Venezuela) Luis David Martínez	7–6^{(7–2)}, 4–6, [13–11]
Loss	2–1	Apr 2023	Savannah Challenger, US	Challenger	Clay (green)	(Argentina) Federico Agustín Gómez	(United States) William Blumberg (Venezuela) Luis David Martínez	1–6, 4–6

== ITF Tour titles ==
=== Singles: 14 (14 titles) ===
Legend
ITF Futures (14)

No.	Date	Tournament	Surface	Opponent	Score
1.	Sep 2013	Córdoba, Argentina	Clay	(Uruguay) Martín Cuevas	2–6, 6–4, 6–3
2.	Sep 2013	Córdoba, Argentina	Clay	(Argentina) Pedro Cachín	6–3, 6–2
3.	Jun 2014	Villa María, Argentina	Clay	(Argentina) Tomás Lipovšek Puches	6–4, 6–3
4.	Aug 2014	Misiones, Argentina	Clay	(Brazil) João Pedro Sorgi	6–1, 6–2
5.	Aug 2014	La Rioja, Argentina	Clay	(Argentina) Juan Pablo Paz	7–6^{(7–4)}, 7–5
6.	Sep 2014	Santiago del Estero, Argentina	Clay	(Argentina) Federico Coria	6–3, 6–0
7.	Sep 2014	Villa del Dique, Argentina	Clay	(Argentina) Federico Coria	7–5, 6–1
8.	Mar 2015	Guaymallén, Argentina	Clay	(Argentina) Juan Ignacio Galarza	6–3, 6–4
9.	May 2015	Córdoba, Argentina	Clay	(Argentina) Nicolás Alberto Arreche	6–2, 6–0
10.	May 2015	Villa Allende, Argentina	Clay	(Argentina) Tomás Lipovšek Puches	6–1, 6–2
11.	Mar 2021	Villa María, Argentina	Clay	(Argentina) Camilo Ugo Carabelli	6-3, 6–4
12.	May 2021	Pensacola, US	Clay	(Bulgaria) Adrian Andreev	6–7^{(4–7)}, 6–3, 6–2
13.	Jun 2021	Santo Domingo, Dominican Republic	Hard	(Brazil) Igor Marcondes	6–7^{(5–7)}, 6–1, 7–6^{(2–7)}
14.	Jun 2021	Tulsa, US	Hard	(Argentina) Genaro Olivieri	6–4, 6–0

== See also ==
- Match fixing in tennis
- International Tennis Integrity Agency
