= Internazionali di Tennis Città di Todi =

- 2024 Internazionali di Tennis Città di Todi

ATP Challenger Tour
- Event name: Internazionali di Tennis Città di Todi
- Location: Todi, Italy
- Venue: Tennis Club Todi 1971
- Category: ATP Challenger Tour
- Surface: Clay
- Draw: 32S/32Q/16D
- Prize money: €74,825 (2025),43,000+H
- Website: Website

The Internazionali di Tennis Città di Todi is a professional tennis tournament played on outdoor clay courts. It is currently part of the Association of Tennis Professionals (ATP) Challenger Tour and has been held annually in Todi, Italy since 2007. In 2018 and 2019, the tournament was held in L'Aquila. Since 2010, the event has been held in combination with the Astra Italy Tennis Cup, a $10,000 tournament on the ITF Women's Circuit.

== Past finals ==
=== Men's singles ===
| Year | Champion | Runner-up | Score |
|---|---|---|---|
| 2026 | (Czech Republic) Maxim Mrva | (Argentina) Nicolás Kicker | 6–2, 6–2 |
| 2025 | (Kazakhstan) Timofey Skatov | (Italy) Stefano Travaglia | 7–6^{(7–4)}, 0–6, 6–2 |
| 2024 | (Spain) Carlos Taberner | (Argentina) Santiago Rodríguez Taverna | 6–4, 6–3 |
| 2023 | (Italy) Luciano Darderi | (France) Clément Tabur | 6–4, 6–7^{(5–7)}, 6–1 |
| 2022 | (Argentina) Pedro Cachin | (Argentina) Nicolás Kicker | 6–4, 6–4 |
| 2021 | (Spain) Mario Vilella Martínez | (Italy) Federico Gaio | 7–6^{(7–3)}, 1–6, 6–3 |
| 2020 | (Germany) Yannick Hanfmann | (Spain) Bernabé Zapata Miralles | 6–3, 6–3 |
| 2019 | (Argentina) Andrea Collarini | (Slovakia) Andrej Martin | 6–3, 6–1 |
| 2018 | (Argentina) Facundo Bagnis | (Italy) Paolo Lorenzi | 2–6, 6–3, 6–4 |
| 2017 | (Argentina) Federico Delbonis | (Italy) Marco Cecchinato | 7–5, 6–1 |
| 2016 | (Serbia) Miljan Zekić | (Italy) Stefano Napolitano | 6–7^{(6–8)}, 6–4, 6–3 |
| 2015 | (United Kingdom) Aljaž Bedene | (Argentina) Nicolás Kicker | 7–6^{(7–3)}, 6–4 |
| 2014 | (Slovenia) Aljaž Bedene | (Hungary) Márton Fucsovics | 2–6, 7–6^{(7–4)}, 6–4 |
| 2013 | (Spain) Pere Riba | (Colombia) Santiago Giraldo | 7–6^{(7–5)}, 2–6, 7–6^{(8–6)} |
| 2012 | (Russia) Andrey Kuznetsov | (Italy) Paolo Lorenzi | 6–3, 2–0 ret. |
| 2011 | (Argentina) Carlos Berlocq | (Italy) Filippo Volandri | 6–3, 6–1 |
| 2010 | (Argentina) Carlos Berlocq | (Spain) Marcel Granollers | 6–4, 6–3 |
| 2009 | (Germany) Simon Greul | (Romania) Adrian Ungur | 2–6, 6–1, 7–6^{(8–6)} |
| 2008 | (Italy) Tomas Tenconi | (Spain) Rubén Ramírez Hidalgo | 4–6, 6–3, 6–0 |
| 2007 | (Italy) Stefano Galvani | (Romania) Adrian Ungur | 7–5, 6–2 |

=== Men's doubles ===
| Year | Champions | Runners-up | Score |
|---|---|---|---|
| 2026 | (France) Arthur Reymond (France) Luca Sanchez | (Spain) Mario Mansilla Díez (Spain) Benjamín Winter López | 6–2, 6–4 |
| 2025 | (Italy) Filippo Romano (Italy) Jacopo Vasamì | (Israel) Daniel Cukierman (Denmark) Johannes Ingildsen | 6–4, 6–3 |
| 2024 | (Serbia) Ivan Sabanov (Serbia) Matej Sabanov | (Sweden) Filip Bergevi (Netherlands) Mick Veldheer | 6–4, 7–6^{(7–3)} |
| 2023 | (Brazil) Fernando Romboli (Brazil) Marcelo Zormann | (Argentina) Román Andrés Burruchaga (Brazil) Orlando Luz | 6–7^{(13–15)}, 6–4, [10–5] |
| 2022 | (Argentina) Guido Andreozzi (Argentina) Guillermo Durán | (Monaco) Romain Arneodo (France) Jonathan Eysseric | 6–1, 2–6, [10–6] |
| 2021 | (Italy) Francesco Forti (Italy) Giulio Zeppieri | (Argentina) Facundo Díaz Acosta (Peru) Alexander Merino | 6–3, 6–2 |
| 2020 | (Uruguay) Ariel Behar (Kazakhstan) Andrey Golubev | (France) Elliot Benchetrit (France) Hugo Gaston | 6–4, 6–2 |
| 2019 | (Bosnia and Herzegovina) Tomislav Brkić (Croatia) Ante Pavić | (Switzerland) Luca Margaroli (Italy) Andrea Vavassori | 6–3, 6–2 |
| 2018 | (Italy) Filippo Baldi (Italy) Andrea Pellegrino | (Spain) Pedro Martínez (Netherlands) Mark Vervoort | 4–6, 6–3, [10–5] |
| 2017 | (Australia) Steven de Waard (New Zealand) Ben McLachlan | (Croatia) Marin Draganja (Croatia) Tomislav Draganja | 6–7^{(7–9)}, 6–4, [10–7] |
| 2016 | (Brazil) Marcelo Demoliner (Brazil) Fabrício Neis | (Italy) Salvatore Caruso (Italy) Alessandro Giannessi | 6–1, 3–6, [10–5] |
| 2015 | (Italy) Flavio Cipolla (Argentina) Máximo González | (Germany) Andreas Beck (Germany) Peter Gojowczyk | 6–4, 6–1 |
| 2014 | (Argentina) Guillermo Durán (Argentina) Máximo González | (Italy) Riccardo Ghedin (Germany) Claudio Grassi | 6–1, 3–6, [10–7] |
| 2013 | (Colombia) Santiago Giraldo (Colombia) Cristian Rodríguez | (Italy) Andrea Arnaboldi (Italy) Gianluca Naso | 4–6, 7–6^{(7–2)}, [10–3] |
| 2012 | (Austria) Martin Fischer (Austria) Philipp Oswald | (Italy) Marco Cecchinato (Italy) Alessio di Mauro | 6–3, 6–2 |
| 2011 | (Italy) Stefano Ianni (Italy) Luca Vanni | (Austria) Martin Fischer (Italy) Alessandro Motti | 6–4, 1–6, [11–9] |
| 2010 | (Italy) Flavio Cipolla (Italy) Alessio di Mauro | (Spain) Marcel Granollers (Spain) Gerard Granollers | 6–1, 6–4 |
| 2009 | (Austria) Martin Fischer (Austria) Philipp Oswald | (Spain) Pablo Santos (Spain) Gabriel Trujillo Soler | 7–5, 6–3 |
| 2008 | (Italy) Gianluca Naso (Italy) Walter Trusendi | (Italy) Alberto Brizzi (Italy) Alessandro Motti | 4–6, 7–6^{(7–3)}, [10–4] |
| 2007 | (Italy) Daniele Giorgini (Italy) Alessandro Motti | (Italy) Enrico Burzi (Italy) Stefano Galvani | 3–6, 7–5, [10–4] |

=== Women's singles ===
| Year | Champion | Runner-up | Score |
|---|---|---|---|
| 2014 | (Italy) Alice Savoretti | (United States) Lauren Embree | 6–3, 6–3 |
| 2013 | (Italy) Alice Balducci | (Armenia) Ani Amiraghyan | 6–4, 6–3 |
| 2012 | (Spain) Sara Sorribes Tormo | (Spain) Rocío de la Torre Sánchez | 4–6, 6–1, 6–3 |
| 2011 | (Italy) Alice Balducci | (Italy) Alice Moroni | 6–1, 4–6, 6–3 |
| 2010 | (Italy) Federica Di Sarra | (Austria) Lisa Maria Reichmann | 6–1, 6–3 |

=== Women's doubles ===
| Year | Champions | Runners-up | Score |
|---|---|---|---|
| 2014 | (Italy) Deborah Chiesa (Italy) Beatrice Lombardo | (Italy) Federica Di Sarra (Italy) Alice Savoretti | 6–3, 3–6, [10–8] |
| 2013 | (Armenia) Ani Amiraghyan (Italy) Alice Balducci | (Italy) Claudia Giovine (Japan) Yuka Mori | 6–2, 6–3 |
| 2012 | (Belarus) Nastassia Rubel (Spain) Rocío de la Torre Sánchez | (Italy) Alessia Camplone (Italy) Sara Sussarello | 6–1, 6–0 |
| 2011 | (Italy) Federica Di Sarra (Italy) Angelica Moratelli | (Australia) Stephanie Bengson (United States) Kirsten Flower | 7–6^{(7–5)}, 7–5 |
| 2010 | (Switzerland) Lisa Sabino (Italy) Maria-Letizia Zavagli | (Italy) Alice Balducci (Italy) Federica Grazioso | 0–6, 7–6^{(7–4)}, [10–8] |
