= 2012 Seguros Bolívar Open Barranquilla – Singles =

Singles
- 2012 Seguros Bolívar Open Barranquilla

Final
- Champion: (Colombia) Alejandro Falla
- Runner-up: (Argentina) Horacio Zeballos
- Score: 6–4, 6–1

Events
Singles	Doubles
← 2011 ·	Seguros Bolívar Open Barranquilla	· 2013 →

Facundo Bagnis is the defending champion but lost in the quarterfinals.
Alejandro Falla won the title, defeating Horacio Zeballos 6–4, 6–1 in the final.

== Seeds ==
1. (Colombia) Alejandro Falla (champion)
2. (Brazil) João Souza (first round)
3. (Argentina) Diego Junqueira (first round)
4. (France) Éric Prodon (second round, retired due to a left knee injury)
5. (Chile) Paul Capdeville (first round)
6. (Spain) Rubén Ramírez Hidalgo (second round)
7. (Argentina) Horacio Zeballos (final)
8. (Italy) Matteo Viola (first round)

== Draw ==
=== Key ===
- Q = Qualifier
- WC = Wild card
- LL = Lucky loser
- Alt = Alternate
- SE = Special exempt
- PR = Protected ranking
- ITF = ITF entry
- JE = Junior exempt
- w/o = Walkover
- r = Retired
- d = Defaulted
- SR = Special ranking

=== Finals ===
Semifinals
1/WC	(Colombia) Alejandro Falla	7^{7}	3	6
(Argentina) Martín Alund	6^{5}	6	2
Q	(Portugal) Pedro Sousa	6^{6}	4
7	(Argentina) Horacio Zeballos	7^{8}	6

Final
1/WC	(Colombia) Alejandro Falla	6	6
7	(Argentina) Horacio Zeballos	4	1

=== Top half ===
First round
1/WC	(Colombia) A Falla	6	7^{7}
WC	(Colombia) R Farah	1	6^{5}
(Argentina) S Decoud	7^{7}	7^{7}
Q	(Argentina) A Molteni	6^{5}	6^{5}
(Italy) M Marrai	6	4	6
(Brazil) A Ghem	4	6	3
(Colombia) A González	7^{9}	3	7
5	(Chile) P Capdeville	6^{7}	6	5
4	(France) É Prodon	6	6
(Brazil) G Clezar	3	3
(Brazil) R Hocevar	5	4
(Argentina) Marco Trungelliti	7	6
(Argentina) M Alund	6	6
(Colombia) E Struvay	4	0
Q	(Germany) S Stadler	2	4
6	(Spain) R Ramírez Hidalgo	6	6

Second round
1/WC	(Colombia) A Falla	6	2	6
(Argentina) S Decoud	3	6	4
(Italy) M Marrai	6	4	6
(Colombia) A González	1	6	2
4	(France) É Prodon	3	0^{r}
(Argentina) Marco Trungelliti	6	4
(Argentina) M Alund	6	6
6	(Spain) R Ramírez Hidalgo	3	2

Quarterfinals
1/WC	(Colombia) A Falla	6	6
(Italy) M Marrai	3	1
(Argentina) Marco Trungelliti	4	3
(Argentina) M Alund	6	6

Semifinals
1/WC	(Colombia) A Falla	7^{7}	3	6
(Argentina) M Alund	6^{5}	6	2

=== Bottom half ===
First round
8	(Italy) M Viola	1	1
(Italy) S Vagnozzi	6	6
(Dominican Republic) V Estrella	3	3
(Argentina) G Pella	6	6
WC	(Chile) N Massú	2	2
(United Kingdom) J Ward	6	6
Q	(Portugal) P Sousa	6	2	6
3	(Argentina) D Junqueira	1	6	0
7	(Argentina) H Zeballos	6	6
(Chile) G Rivera-Aránguiz	1	4
(Colombia) C Salamanca	6	6
Q	(United States) N Monroe	1	3
(Chinese Taipei) T Chen	1	1
WC	(Chile) M Sborowitz	6	6
(Argentina) F Bagnis	1	7^{7}	6
2	(Brazil) J Souza	6	6^{5}	4

Second round
(Italy) S Vagnozzi	3	4
(Argentina) G Pella	6	6
(United Kingdom) J Ward	3	1
Q	(Portugal) P Sousa	6	6
7	(Argentina) H Zeballos	6	6
(Colombia) C Salamanca	3	3
WC	(Chile) M Sborowitz	2	3
(Argentina) F Bagnis	6	6

Quarterfinals
(Argentina) G Pella	6	0	3
Q	(Portugal) P Sousa	2	6	6
7	(Argentina) H Zeballos	6	6
(Argentina) F Bagnis	4	2

Semifinals
Q	(Portugal) P Sousa	6^{6}	4
7	(Argentina) H Zeballos	7^{8}	6
