= 2014 Seguros Bolívar Open Barranquilla – Singles =

Singles
- 2014 Seguros Bolívar Open Barranquilla

Final
- Champion: (Uruguay) Pablo Cuevas
- Runner-up: (Slovakia) Martin Kližan
- Score: 6–3, 6–1

Events
Singles	Doubles
← 2013 ·	Seguros Bolívar Open Barranquilla	· 2015 →

Federico Delbonis was the defending champion, but decided not to compete.

Pablo Cuevas won the title, defeating Martin Kližan in the final, 6–3, 6–1.

== Seeds ==
1. (Colombia) Alejandro Falla (quarterfinals)
2. (Spain) Albert Ramos (semifinals)
3. (Slovakia) Martin Kližan (final)
4. (Austria) Andreas Haider-Maurer (quarterfinals)
5. (Argentina) Facundo Argüello (second round)
6. (Romania) Adrian Ungur (semifinals)
7. (Spain) Pere Riba (quarterfinals)
8. (Slovenia) Blaž Rola (quarterfinals)

== Draw ==
=== Key ===
- Q = Qualifier
- WC = Wild card
- LL = Lucky loser
- Alt = Alternate
- SE = Special exempt
- PR = Protected ranking
- ITF = ITF entry
- JE = Junior exempt
- w/o = Walkover
- r = Retired
- d = Defaulted
- SR = Special ranking

=== Finals ===
Semifinals
(Uruguay) Pablo Cuevas	6	6^{2}	6
6	(Romania) Adrian Ungur	4	7^{7}	2
3	(Slovakia) Martin Kližan	4	6	6
2	(Spain) Albert Ramos	6	3	2

Final
(Uruguay) Pablo Cuevas	6	6
3	(Slovakia) Martin Kližan	3	1

=== Top half ===
First round
1	(Colombia) A Falla	6	6
WC	(Argentina) E Schwank	3	2
(Brazil) R Dutra da Silva	7^{7}	3	6^{2}
Q	(Australia) J Kubler	6^{3}	6	7^{7}
(Germany) M Zverev	3	0^{r}
(Uruguay) P Cuevas	6	0
(Venezuela) D Souto	3	2
5	(Argentina) F Argüello	6	6
4	(Austria) A Haider-Maurer	7^{7}	6
Q	(France) J Eysseric	6^{2}	2
(Italy) P Starace	2	0^{r}
Q	(Dominican Republic) J Hernández	6	0
(Italy) T Fabbiano	6^{6}	5
Q	(Croatia) A Veić	7^{8}	7
(Chile) P Capdeville	4	4
6	(Romania) A Ungur	6	6

Second round
1	(Colombia) A Falla	w/o
Q	(Australia) J Kubler
(Uruguay) P Cuevas	6	6
5	(Argentina) F Argüello	4	0
4	(Austria) A Haider-Maurer	7	2	6
Q	(Dominican Republic) J Hernández	5	6	2
Q	(Croatia) A Veić	1	7	1
6	(Romania) A Ungur	6	5	6

Quarterfinals
1	(Colombia) A Falla	5	6	1
(Uruguay) P Cuevas	7	4	6
4	(Austria) A Haider-Maurer	3	2
6	(Romania) A Ungur	6	6

Semifinals
(Uruguay) P Cuevas	6	6^{2}	6
6	(Romania) A Ungur	4	7^{7}	2

=== Bottom half ===
First round
8	(Slovenia) B Rola	6	4	6
WC	(Colombia) N Barrientos	1	6	4
(Japan) T Daniel	5	4
(Argentina) M González	7	6
(Argentina) F Bagnis	3	6	6
(Argentina) G Andreozzi	6	4	1
(Argentina) R Olivo	4	2
3	(Slovakia) M Kližan	6	6
7	(Spain) P Riba	6	6
WC	(Colombia) C Salamanca	3	4
(Argentina) DS Schwartzman	7^{12}	6
(Argentina) M Alund	6^{10}	2
(Argentina) A Collarini	5	4
(Portugal) G Elias	7	6
WC	(Germany) A Zverev	1	0
2	(Spain) A Ramos	6	6

Second round
8	(Slovenia) B Rola	4	6	7^{7}
(Argentina) M González	6	3	6^{4}
(Argentina) F Bagnis	2	2
3	(Slovakia) M Kližan	6	6
7	(Spain) P Riba	6	6
(Argentina) DS Schwartzman	3	2
(Portugal) G Elias	6^{4}	6	3
2	(Spain) A Ramos	7^{7}	3	6

Quarterfinals
8	(Slovenia) B Rola	4	2
3	(Slovakia) M Kližan	6	6
7	(Spain) P Riba	3	4
2	(Spain) A Ramos	6	6

Semifinals
3	(Slovakia) M Kližan	4	6	6
2	(Spain) A Ramos	6	3	2
