= 2012 Seguros Bolívar Open Barranquilla – Doubles =

Doubles
- 2012 Seguros Bolívar Open Barranquilla

Final
- Champions: (United States) Nicholas Monroe (United States) Maciek Sykut
- Runners-up: (Uruguay) Marcel Felder (Germany) Frank Moser
- Score: 2–6, 6–3, [10–5]

Events
Singles	Doubles
← 2011 ·	Seguros Bolívar Open Barranquilla	· 2013 →

Flavio Cipolla and Paolo Lorenzi were the defending champions but decided not to participate.
Nicholas Monroe and Maciek Sykut won the final against Marcel Felder and Frank Moser 2–6, 6–3, [10–5] to win the title.

== Seeds ==
1. (Spain) Rubén Ramírez Hidalgo / (Argentina) Horacio Zeballos (semifinals)
2. (Uruguay) Marcel Felder / (Germany) Frank Moser (final)
3. (United States) Nicholas Monroe / (United States) Maciek Sykut (champions)
4. (Italy) Simone Vagnozzi / (Italy) Matteo Viola (first round)

== Draw ==
=== Key ===
- Q = Qualifier
- WC = Wild card
- LL = Lucky loser
- Alt = Alternate
- SE = Special exempt
- PR = Protected ranking
- ITF = ITF entry
- JE = Junior exempt
- w/o = Walkover
- r = Retired
- d = Defaulted
- SR = Special ranking

=== Draw ===
First round
1	(Spain) R Ramírez Hidalgo (Argentina) H Zeballos	6	6
(Ecuador) JC Campozano (Dominican Republic) V Estrella	2	0
(Chile) J Aguilar (Mexico) D Garza	6	6
WC	(United States) Sam Barnett (United States) K Kim	1	1
3	(United States) N Monroe (United States) M Sykut	7	6
(Colombia) R Farah (Colombia) A González	5	2
(Argentina) F Bagnis (Uruguay) A Behar	6	6
WC	(Dominican Republic) Michael-Ray Pallares-González (United States) Murphey Parker	2	3
(Argentina) A Molteni (Argentina) Marco Trungelliti	3	3
Alt	(Brazil) M Demoliner (Argentina) G Pella	6	6
(Argentina) M Alund (Argentina) D Junqueira	6	6
4	(Italy) S Vagnozzi (Italy) M Viola	2	3
(Argentina) S Decoud (Germany) S Stadler	6	6
WC	(Colombia) C Salamanca (Colombia) E Struvay	2	4
(Canada) S Diez (United Kingdom) J Ward	6	4	[8]
2	(Uruguay) M Felder (Germany) F Moser	2	6	[10]

Quarterfinals
1	(Spain) R Ramírez Hidalgo (Argentina) H Zeballos	7^{7}	6
(Chile) J Aguilar (Mexico) D Garza	6^{3}	2
3	(United States) N Monroe (United States) M Sykut	6	6^{6}	[10]
(Argentina) F Bagnis (Uruguay) A Behar	2	7^{8}	[6]
Alt	(Brazil) M Demoliner (Argentina) G Pella	1	2
(Argentina) M Alund (Argentina) D Junqueira	6	6
(Argentina) S Decoud (Germany) S Stadler	1	2
2	(Uruguay) M Felder (Germany) F Moser	6	6

Semifinals
1	(Spain) R Ramírez Hidalgo (Argentina) H Zeballos	1	7	[8]
3	(United States) N Monroe (United States) M Sykut	6	5	[10]
(Argentina) M Alund (Argentina) D Junqueira	3	1
2	(Uruguay) M Felder (Germany) F Moser	6	6

Final
3	(United States) N Monroe (United States) M Sykut	2	6	[10]
2	(Uruguay) M Felder (Germany) F Moser	6	3	[5]
