= Borna Ćorić career statistics =

Career finals
Discipline	Type	Won	Lost	Total	WR
Singles	Grand Slam	–	–	–	–
Singles	ATP Finals	–	–	–	–
Singles	ATP 1000	1	1	2	0.50
Singles	ATP 500	1	1	2	0.50
Singles	ATP 250	1	3	4	0.25
Singles	Olympics	–	–	–	–
Singles	Total	3	5	8	0.38
Doubles	Grand Slam	–	–	–	–
Doubles	ATP Finals	–	–	–	–
Doubles	ATP 1000	–	–	–	–
Doubles	ATP 500	–	–	–	–
Doubles	ATP 250	–	–	–	–
Doubles	Olympics	–	–	–	–
Doubles	Total	–	–	–	–

This is a list of main career statistics of Croatian professional tennis player Borna Ćorić. All statistics are according to the ATP Tour and ITF websites.

== Performance timelines ==
Key
W	F	SF	QF	#R	RR	Q#	DNQ	A	NH

(W) winner; (F) finalist; (SF) semifinalist; (QF) quarterfinalist; (#R) rounds 4, 3, 2, 1; (RR) round-robin stage; (Q#) qualification round; (DNQ) did not qualify; (A) absent; (NH) not held; (SR) strike rate (events won / competed); (W–L) win–loss record.
To avoid confusion and double counting, these charts are updated at the conclusion of a tournament or when the player's participation has ended.

Only main-draw results in ATP Tour, Grand Slam tournaments, Davis Cup/ATP Cup/United Cup/Laver Cup and Olympic Games are included in win–loss records.

=== Singles ===
Current through the 2025 US Open.

Tournament	2013	2014	2015	2016	2017	2018	2019	2020	2021	2022	2023	2024	2025	2026	SR	W–L	Win%
Grand Slam Tournaments
Australian Open	A	A	1R	1R	1R	1R	4R	1R	2R	A	1R	1R	1R	A	0 / 10	4–10	29%
French Open	A	A	3R	3R	2R	3R	3R	1R	A	2R	3R	1R	Q1		0 / 9	12–9	57%
Wimbledon	A	Q1	2R	1R	1R	1R	A	NH	A	A	1R	2R	A		0 / 6	2–6	25%
US Open	A	2R	1R	1R	3R	4R	2R	QF	A	2R	1R	1R	1R		0 / 11	12–10	55%
Win–loss	0–0	1–1	3–4	2–4	3–4	5–4	6–2	4–3	1–1	2–2	2–4	1–4	0–2	0–0	0 / 36	30–35	46%
National representation
Summer Olympics	NH			1R	NH				A	NH		A	NH		0 / 1	0–1	0%
Davis Cup	PO	PO	1R	F	A	W	1R	A (Note: Edition is split into two years due to COVID-19.)		SF	RR	A	A		1 / 7	16–9	64%
Year-end championships
ATP Finals	DNQ					Alt	DNQ								0 / 0	0–0	–
ATP Masters 1000
Indian Wells Open	A	A	2R	3R	1R	SF	2R	NH	A	1R	2R	2R	A	A	0 / 8	9–8	53%
Miami Open	A	A	2R	1R	3R	QF	QF	NH	A	2R	2R	A	A	A	0 / 7	10–7	59%
Monte-Carlo Masters	A	A	1R	1R	1R	2R	QF	NH	A	1R	1R	2R	A	A	0 / 8	5–8	38%
Madrid Open	A	A	A	2R	QF	3R	1R	NH	A	1R	SF	2R	1R	A	0 / 8	11–8	58%
Italian Open	A	A	Q2	1R	A	1R	3R	2R	A	1R	QF	1R	A		0 / 7	6–7	46%
Canadian Open	A	A	1R	2R	2R	2R	2R	NH	A	1R	1R	2R	1R		0 / 9	5–9	36%
Cincinnati Open	A	A	2R	QF	1R	2R	1R	2R	A	W	2R	Q1	1R		1 / 9	13–8	62%
Shanghai Masters	A	A	2R	A	Q1	F	1R	NH			A	Q1	A		0 / 3	6–3	67%
Paris Masters	A	A	2R	A	2R	3R	1R	2R	A	1R	A	A	A		0 / 6	4–6	40%
Win–loss	0–0	0–0	5–7	7–7	7–7	19–9	9–9	3–3	0–0	7–7	8–7	4–5	0–3	0–0	1 / 65	69–64	52%
Career statistics
	2013	2014	2015	2016	2017	2018	2019	2020	2021	2022	2023	2024	2025	2026	Career		
Tournaments	1	5	27	21	27	20	22	10	3	13	19	18	7	0	Career total: 193		
Titles	0	0	0	0	1	1	0	0	0	1	0	0	0	0	Career total: 3		
Finals	0	0	0	2	1	2	1	1	0	1	0	1	0	0	Career total: 9		
Overall win–loss	0–2	7–6	26–28	22–24	24–26	40–20	27–22	16–12	6–3	20–13	22–19	12–19	1–8	0–0	3 / 193	223–202	52%
Win (%)	0%	54%	48%	48%	48%	67%	55%	57%	67%	61%	54%	39%	11%	–	Career total: 52%		
Year-end ranking	303	102	44	48	48	12	28	24	73	26	37	90	115		$13,515,306		

=== Doubles ===
Tournament	2013	2014	2015	2016	2017	2018	2019	2020	2021	2022	2023	SR	W–L	Win %
Grand Slam Tournaments
Australian Open	A	A	A	A	A	A	A	A	A	A	A	0 / 0	0–0	–
French Open	A	A	A	A	A	A	A	A	A	A	A	0 / 0	0–0	–
Wimbledon	A	A	A	A	A	A	A	NH	A	A	A	0 / 0	0–0	–
US Open	A	A	A	A	A	A	A	A	A	A	A	0 / 0	0–0	–
Win–loss	0–0	0–0	0–0	0–0	0–0	0–0	0–0	0–0	0–0	0–0	0–0	0 / 0	0–0	–
National representation
Summer Olympics	NH			A	NH				A	NH		0 / 0	0–0	–
Davis Cup	PO	PO	1R	F	A	W	1R	A		SF	RR	1 / 7	0–0	–
ATP Masters 1000
Indian Wells Open	A	A	A	A	A	A	A	NH	A	A	A	0 / 0	0–0	–
Miami Open	A	A	A	A	A	A	A	NH	A	A	A	0 / 0	0–0	–
Monte-Carlo Masters	A	A	A	A	A	A	A	NH	A	A	A	0 / 0	0–0	–
Madrid Open	A	A	A	A	A	A	A	NH	A	A	A	0 / 0	0–0	–
Italian Open	A	A	A	A	A	A	1R	A	A	A	A	0 / 1	0–1	0%
Canadian Open	A	A	A	A	A	1R	A	NH	A	A	A	0 / 1	0–1	0%
Cincinnati Open	A	A	A	A	A	A	A	1R	A	A	A	0 / 1	0–1	0%
Shanghai Masters	A	A	A	A	A	A	1R	NH			A	0 / 1	0–1	0%
Paris Masters	A	A	A	A	A	A	A	A	A	A	A	0 / 0	0–0	–
Win–loss	0–0	0–0	0–0	0–0	0–0	0–1	0–2	0–1	0–0	0–0	0–0	0 / 4	0–4	0%
Career statistics
	2013	2014	2015	2016	2017	2018	2019	2020	2021	2022	2023	Career		
Tournaments	1	0	3	3	3	2	2	1	0	0	1	Career total: 16		
Titles	0	0	0	0	0	0	0	0	0	0	0	Career total: 0		
Finals	0	0	0	0	0	0	0	0	0	0	0	Career total: 0		
Overall win–loss	0–1	0–0	0–3	3–3	0–3	1–2	0–2	0–1	0–0	0–0	0–1	0 / 16	4–16	20%
Win %	0%	–	0%	50%	0%	33%	0%	0%	–	–	0%	Career total: 20%		
Year-end ranking	836	777	–	415	–	451	–	–	–	–	–			

== Significant finals ==
=== ATP 1000 tournaments ===
==== Singles: 2 (1 title, 1 runner-up) ====
Result	Year	Tournament	Surface	Opponent	Score
Loss	2018	Shanghai Masters	Hard	(Serbia) Novak Djokovic	3–6, 4–6
Win	2022	Cincinnati Open	Hard	(Greece) Stefanos Tsitsipas	7–6^{(7–0)}, 6–2

== ATP Tour finals ==
=== Singles: 9 (3 titles, 6 runner-ups) ===
Legend Grand Slam (0–0) ATP Finals (0–0) ATP Masters 1000 (1–1) ATP 500 (1–1) ATP 250 (1–4)	Finals by surface Hard (1–5) Clay (1–1) Grass (1–0)	Finals by setting Outdoor (3–3) Indoor (0–3)

Result	W–L	Date	Tournament	Tier	Surface	Opponent	Score
Loss	0–1	Jan 2016	Maharashtra Open, India	ATP 250	Hard	(Switzerland) Stan Wawrinka	3–6, 5–7
Loss	0–2	Apr 2016	Grand Prix Hassan II, Morocco	ATP 250	Clay	(Argentina) Federico Delbonis	2–6, 4–6
Win	1–2	Apr 2017	Grand Prix Hassan II, Morocco	ATP 250	Clay	(Germany) Philipp Kohlschreiber	5–7, 7–6^{(7–3)}, 7–5
Win	2–2	Jun 2018	Halle Open, Germany	ATP 500	Grass	(Switzerland) Roger Federer	7–6^{(8–6)}, 3–6, 6–2
Loss	2–3	Oct 2018	Shanghai Masters, China	Masters 1000	Hard	(Serbia) Novak Djokovic	3–6, 4–6
Loss	2–4	Sep 2019	St. Petersburg Open, Russia	ATP 250	Hard (i)	(Russia) Daniil Medvedev	3–6, 1–6
Loss	2–5	Oct 2020	St. Petersburg Open, Russia	ATP 500	Hard (i)	(Russia) Andrey Rublev	6–7^{(5–7)}, 4–6
Win	3–5	Aug 2022	Cincinnati Open, United States	Masters 1000	Hard	(Greece) Stefanos Tsitsipas	7–6^{(7–0)}, 6–2
Loss	3–6	Feb 2024	Open Sud de France, France	ATP 250	Hard (i)	(Kazakhstan) Alexander Bublik	7–5, 2–6, 3–6

== ATP Challenger Tour finals ==
=== Singles: 8 (7 titles, 1 runner-up) ===
Legend ATP Challenger Tour (7–1)	Finals by surface Hard (3–1) Clay (4–0)

Result	W–L	Date	Tournament	Tiers	Surface	Opponent	Score
Win	1–0	Sep 2014	İzmir, Turkey	Challenger	Hard	(Tunisia) Malek Jaziri	6–1, 6–7^{(7–9)}, 6–4
Win	2–0	Sep 2015	Barranquilla, Colombia	Challenger	Clay	(Brazil) Rogério Dutra Silva	6–4, 6–1
Win	3–0	Jun 2022	Parma, Italy	Challenger	Clay	(Sweden) Elias Ymer	7–6^{(7–4)}, 6–0
Loss	3–1	Jan 2024	Ottignies-Louvain-la-Neuve, Belgium	Challenger	Hard (i)	(Switzerland) Leandro Riedi	5–7, 2–6
Win	4–1	Feb 2025	Lugano, Switzerland	Challenger	Hard (i)	(Belgium) Raphaël Collignon	6–3, 6–1
Win	5–1	Mar 2025	Thionville, France	Challenger	Hard (i)	(France) Arthur Bouquier	6–4, 6–4
Win	6–1	Mar 2025	Zadar, Croatia	Challenger	Clay	(France) Valentin Royer	3–6, 6–2, 6–3
Win	7–1	Apr 2025	Aix-en-Provence, France	Challenger	Clay	(Switzerland) Stan Wawrinka	6–7^{(5–7)}, 6–3, 7–6^{(7–4)}

== ITF Futures finals ==
=== Singles: 6 (5 titles, 1 runner-up) ===
Legend ITF Futures (5–1)	Finals by surface Hard (4–1) Clay (1–0)

Result	W–L	Date	Tournament	Tiers	Surface	Opponent	Score
Win	1–0	Apr 2013	Great Britain F9, Bournemouth	Futures	Clay	(United Kingdom) Daniel Cox	6–7^{(4–7)}, 6–4, 6–3
Win	2–0	Aug 2013	Turkey F32, İzmir	Futures	Hard	(France) Enzo Couacaud	6–7^{(0–7)}, 7–6^{(7–1)}, 7–5
Win	3–0	Aug 2013	Turkey F33, İzmir	Futures	Hard	(South Africa) Tucker Vorster	6–4, 6–4
Win	4–0	Oct 2013	Nigeria F1, Lagos	Futures	Hard	(Croatia) Ante Pavić	6–4, 6–3
Win	5–0	Dec 2013	Turkey F51, Istanbul	Futures	Hard (i)	(Turkey) Barış Ergüden	6–4, 3–6, 6–3
Loss	5–1	Apr 2014	China F4, Chengdu	Futures	Hard	(China) Wu Di	4–6, 2–6

=== Doubles: 2 (2 runner-ups) ===
Legend ITF Futures (0–2)

Result	W–L	Date	Tournament	Tier	Surface	Partner	Opponents	Score
Loss	0–1	Oct 2013	Nigeria F1, Lagos	Futures	Hard	(Croatia) Dino Marcan	(Croatia) Ante Pavić (South Africa) Ruan Roelofse	6–7^{(3–7)}, 2–6
Loss	0–2	Oct 2013	Nigeria F2, Lagos	Futures	Hard	(Croatia) Dino Marcan	(Croatia) Ante Pavić (South Africa) Ruan Roelofse	5–7, 3–6

== Junior Grand Slam finals ==
=== Singles: 1 (1 title) ===
Result	Year	Tournament	Surface	Opponent	Score
Win	2013	US Open	Hard	(Australia) Thanasi Kokkinakis	3–6, 6–3, 6–1

== Best Grand Slam results details ==
Australian Open
2019 Australian Open (11th seed)
Round	Opponent	Score
1R	(Belgium) Steve Darcis (PR)	6–1, 6–4, 6–4
2R	(Hungary) Márton Fucsovics	6–4, 6–3, 6–4
3R	(Serbia) Filip Krajinović	2–6, 6–3, 6–4, 6–3
4R	(France) Lucas Pouille (28)	7–6^{(7–4)}, 4–6, 5–7, 6–7^{(2–7)}

Wimbledon Championships
2015 Wimbledon (not seeded)
Round	Opponent	Score
1R	(Ukraine) Sergiy Stakhovsky	4–6, 7–6^{(7–5)}, 6–2, 1–6, 9–7
2R	(Italy) Andreas Seppi (25)	6–4, 4–6, 7–6^{(7–3)}, 1–6, 1–6

French Open
2015 French Open (not seeded)
Round	Opponent	Score
1R	(United States) Sam Querrey	7–6^{(10–8)}, 6–3, 0–6, 6–3
2R	(Spain) Tommy Robredo (18)	7–5, 3–6, 6–2, 4–6, 6–4
3R	(United States) Jack Sock	2–6, 1–6, 4–6
... 2016, 2018, 2019 (Note: Ćorić has third round as his highest result at the French Open, first achieved in 2015 and then repeated it in 2016, 2018 and 2019.)
2023 French Open (15th seed)
Round	Opponent	Score
1R	(Argentina) Federico Coria	7–6^{(7–3)}, 6–7^{(5–7)}, 6–3, 6–3
2R	(Argentina) Pedro Cachín	6–3, 4–6, 4–6, 6–3, 6–4
3R	(Argentina) Tomás Martín Etcheverry	3–6, 6–7^{(5–7)}, 2–6

US Open
2020 US Open (27th seed)
Round	Opponent	Score
1R	(Spain) Pablo Andújar	7–5, 6–3, 6–1
2R	(Argentina) Juan Ignacio Londero	7–5, 4–6, 6–7^{(5–7)}, 6–2, 6–3
3R	(Greece) Stefanos Tsitsipas (4)	6–7^{(2–7)}, 6–4, 4–6, 7–5, 7–6^{(7–4)}
4R	(Australia) Jordan Thompson	7–5, 6–1, 6–3
QF	(Germany) Alexander Zverev (5)	6–1, 6–7^{(5–7)}, 6–7^{(1–7)}, 3–6

== Wins over top 10 players ==
- Ćorić has a 19–43 record against players who were, at the time the match was played, ranked in the top 10.

Year	2014	2015	2016	2017	2018	2019	2020	2021	2022	2023	2024	2025	2026	Total
Wins	1	1	1	3	6	0	2	0	4	0	1	0	0	19

#	Player	Rank	Event	Surface	Rd	Score	BCR	Year	Ref
1	(Spain) Rafael Nadal	3	Swiss Indoors, Switzerland	Hard (i)	QF	6–2, 7–6^{(7–4)}	124	2014	
2	(United Kingdom) Andy Murray	3	Dubai Championships, UAE	Hard	QF	6–1, 6–3	84	2015	
3	(Spain) Rafael Nadal	5	Cincinnati Open, United States	Hard	3R	6–1, 6–3	49	2016	
4	(Austria) Dominic Thiem	8	Miami Open, United States	Hard	2R	6–1, 7–5	62	2017	
5	(United Kingdom) Andy Murray	1	Madrid Open, Spain	Clay	3R	6–3, 6–3	59	2017	
6	(Germany) Alexander Zverev	6	US Open, United States	Hard	2R	3–6, 7–5, 7–6^{(7–1)}, 7–6^{(7–4)}	61	2017	
7	(Spain) Pablo Carreño Busta	10	Qatar Open	Hard	1R	5–7, 6–2, 7–6^{(10–8)}	48	2018	
8	(South Africa) Kevin Anderson	9	Indian Wells Open, United States	Hard	QF	2–6, 6–4, 7–6^{(7–3)}	49	2018	
9	(Germany) Alexander Zverev	3	Halle Open, Germany	Grass	1R	6–1, 6–4	34	2018	
10	(Switzerland) Roger Federer	1	Halle Open, Germany	Grass	F	7–6^{(8–6)}, 3–6, 6–2	34	2018	
11	(Argentina) Juan Martín del Potro	4	Shanghai Masters, China	Hard	3R	7–5, ret.	19	2018	
12	(Switzerland) Roger Federer	2	Shanghai Masters, China	Hard	SF	6–4, 6–4	19	2018	
13	(Austria) Dominic Thiem	4	ATP Cup, Sydney, Australia	Hard	GS	7–6^{(7–4)}, 2–6, 6–3	28	2020	
14	(Greece) Stefanos Tsitsipas	6	US Open, United States	Hard	3R	6–7^{(7–2)}, 6–4, 4–6, 7–5, 7–6^{(7–4)}	32	2020	
15	(Spain) Rafael Nadal	3	Cincinnati Open, United States	Hard	2R	7–6^{(11–9)}, 4–6, 6–3	152	2022	
16	(Canada) Félix Auger-Aliassime	9	Cincinnati Open, United States	Hard	QF	6–4, 6–4	152	2022	
17	(Greece) Stefanos Tsitsipas	7	Cincinnati Open, United States	Hard	F	7–6^{(7–0)}, 6–2	152	2022	
18	(Greece) Stefanos Tsitsipas	5	Vienna Open, Austria	Hard (i)	2R	4–6, 6–4, 7–6^{(7–4)}	27	2022	
19	(Denmark) Holger Rune	7	Montpellier Open, France	Hard (i)	SF	6–3, 4–1 ret.	37	2024	
