= 2014 Seguros Bolívar Open Barranquilla – Doubles =

Doubles
- 2014 Seguros Bolívar Open Barranquilla

Final
- Champion: (Uruguay) Pablo Cuevas (Spain) Pere Riba
- Runner-up: (Czech Republic) František Čermák (Russia) Michail Elgin
- Score: 6–4, 6–3

Events
Singles	Doubles
← 2013 ·	Seguros Bolívar Open Barranquilla	· 2015 →

Facundo Bagnis and Federico Delbonis were the defending champions, although they did not play together. Facundo Bagnis played alongside Diego Sebastián Schwartzman, while Federico Delbonis did not participate.

Facundo Bagnis and Diego Sebastián Schwartzman lost in the semifinals to Pablo Cuevas and Pere Riba.

Pablo Cuevas and Pere Riba won the title, defeating František Čermák and Michail Elgin in the final, 6–4, 6–3.

== Seeds ==
1. (Czech Republic) František Čermák / (Russia) Michail Elgin (final)
2. (Italy) Daniele Bracciali / (Italy) Potito Starace (first round)
3. (Argentina) Máximo González / (Argentina) Eduardo Schwank (semifinals)
4. (United States) Vahid Mirzadeh / (New Zealand) Artem Sitak (first round)

== Draw ==
=== Key ===
- Q = Qualifier
- WC = Wild card
- LL = Lucky loser
- Alt = Alternate
- SE = Special exempt
- PR = Protected ranking
- ITF = ITF entry
- JE = Junior exempt
- w/o = Walkover
- r = Retired
- d = Defaulted
- SR = Special ranking

=== Draw ===
First round
1	(Czech Republic) F Čermák (Russia) M Elgin	6^{5}	7^{7}	[10]
(Argentina) G Andreozzi (Argentina) F Argüello	7^{7}	6^{4}	[6]
WC	(Germany) A Zverev (Germany) M Zverev	4	7^{7}	[2]
(Brazil) RD da Silva (Argentina) R Olivo	6	6^{5}	[10]
3	(Argentina) M González (Argentina) E Schwank	6	3	[10]
(Japan) T Daniel (Venezuela) D Souto	1	6	[6]
(Italy) T Fabbiano (Romania) A Ungur	6	6
WC	(Colombia) Jhan Fontalvo Silva (Dominican Republic) J Hernández	2	2
(Chinese Taipei) H-y Peng (Chinese Taipei) T-h Yang	6	6
WC	(Argentina) Gregorio Cordonnier (Argentina) M Trungelliti	1	3
(Argentina) F Bagnis (Argentina) DS Schwartzman	6	6
4	(United States) V Mirzadeh (New Zealand) A Sitak	2	2
(Argentina) M Alund (Argentina) G Durán	2	2
(Uruguay) P Cuevas (Spain) P Riba	6	6
(Colombia) N Barrientos (Colombia) C Salamanca	7^{11}	7^{7}
2	(Italy) D Bracciali (Italy) P Starace	6^{9}	6^{3}

Quarterfinals
1	(Czech Republic) F Čermák (Russia) M Elgin	6	7^{7}
(Brazil) RD da Silva (Argentina) R Olivo	3	6^{5}
3	(Argentina) M González (Argentina) E Schwank	6	6
(Italy) T Fabbiano (Romania) A Ungur	3	1
(Chinese Taipei) H-y Peng (Chinese Taipei) T-h Yang	6^{2}	6^{2}
(Argentina) F Bagnis (Argentina) DS Schwartzman	7^{7}	7^{7}
(Uruguay) P Cuevas (Spain) P Riba	6	6
(Colombia) N Barrientos (Colombia) C Salamanca	1	4

Semifinals
1	(Czech Republic) F Čermák (Russia) M Elgin	7^{7}	6
3	(Argentina) M González (Argentina) E Schwank	6^{5}	4
(Argentina) F Bagnis (Argentina) DS Schwartzman	4	2
(Uruguay) P Cuevas (Spain) P Riba	6	6

Final
1	(Czech Republic) F Čermák (Russia) M Elgin	4	3
(Uruguay) P Cuevas (Spain) P Riba	6	6
