= 2025 Kia Open Barranquilla – Doubles =

Doubles
- 2025 Kia Open Barranquilla

Final
- Champions: (United States) Benjamin Kittay (Colombia) Cristian Rodríguez
- Runners-up: (Morocco) Taha Baadi (Canada) Dan Martin
- Score: 6–2, 6–4

Events
Singles	Doubles
- Kia Open Barranquilla

Alejandro Falla and Eduardo Struvay were the defending champions but were unable to defend their title as they had retired from professional tennis.

Benjamin Kittay and Cristian Rodríguez won the title after defeating Taha Baadi and Dan Martin 6–2, 6–4 in the final.

== Seeds ==
1. (Venezuela) Luis David Martínez / (Argentina) Santiago Rodríguez Taverna (quarterfinals)
2. (United States) Pranav Kumar / (United States) Joshua Sheehy (quarterfinals)
3. (Peru) Arklon Huertas del Pino / (Brazil) Paulo André Saraiva dos Santos (quarterfinals)
4. (United States) Alfredo Perez / (United States) Jamie Vance (semifinals)

== Draw ==
Key

- Q = Qualifier
- WC = Wild card
- LL = Lucky loser
- Alt = Alternate
- ITF = ITF entry
- PR = Protected ranking
- SR = Special ranking
- SE = Special exempt
- JE = Junior exempt
- JR = Junior Accelerator Programme entrant
- CO = College Accelerator Programme entrant
- NG = Next Gen Accelerator Program entrant
- w/o = Walkover
- r = Retired
- d = Defaulted

=== Draw ===
First round
1	(Venezuela) LD Martínez (Argentina) S Rodríguez Taverna	w/o
(United States) A Ganesan (United States) C Kingsley
(Venezuela) B Pérez (United States) N Schachter	6	3	[8]
(Morocco) T Baadi (Canada) D Martin	4	6	[10]
3	(Peru) A Huertas del Pino (Brazil) PA Saraiva dos Santos	6	7^{7}
(Colombia) Samuel Alejandro Linde Palacios (Colombia) N Mejía	4	6^{3}
(Colombia) A Soriano Barrera (Colombia) Miguel Tobón	6	2	[10]
WC	(Colombia) Alejandro Arcila (Colombia) Samuel Heredia	2	6	[6]
PR	(Barbados) D King (Antigua and Barbuda) J Maginley	6	6
WC	(Colombia) Mateo Castañeda (Colombia) Salvador Price	3	1
(Dominican Republic) P Bertran (United States) Felix Corwin	4	4
4	(United States) A Perez (United States) Jamie Vance	6	6
(Colombia) JS Gómez (Colombia) Johan Alexander Rodríguez	7^{7}	3	[3]
(United States) B Kittay (Colombia) C Rodríguez	6^{4}	6	[10]
(United States) Zachary Fuchs (United States) Wally Thayne	5	6	[3]
2	(United States) P Kumar (United States) J Sheehy	7	2	[10]

Quarterfinals
1	(Venezuela) LD Martínez (Argentina) S Rodríguez Taverna	5	7^{7}	[6]
(Morocco) T Baadi (Canada) D Martin	7	6^{4}	[10]
3	(Peru) A Huertas del Pino (Brazil) PA Saraiva dos Santos	6^{3}	2
(Colombia) A Soriano Barrera (Colombia) M Tobón	7^{7}	6
PR	(Barbados) D King (Antigua and Barbuda) J Maginley	4	4
4	(United States) A Perez (United States) Jam Vance	6	6
(United States) B Kittay (Colombia) C Rodríguez	6	6
2	(United States) P Kumar (United States) J Sheehy	4	1

Semifinals
(Morocco) T Baadi (Canada) D Martin	6	4	[10]
(Colombia) A Soriano Barrera (Colombia) M Tobón	3	6	[8]
4	(United States) A Perez (United States) Jam Vance	6	3	[9]
(United States) B Kittay (Colombia) C Rodríguez	2	6	[11]

Final
(Morocco) T Baadi (Canada) D Martin	2	4
(United States) B Kittay (Colombia) C Rodríguez	6	6
