= 2025 Challenger Seguros del Estado – Singles =

Singles
- 2025 Challenger Seguros del Estado

Final
- Champion: (Colombia) Nicolás Mejía
- Runner-up: (Colombia) Juan Sebastián Gómez
- Score: 6–4, 6–4

Events
Singles	Doubles
- Challenger Seguros del Estado

This was the first edition of the tournament.

Nicolás Mejía won the title after defeating Juan Sebastián Gómez 6–4, 6–4 in the final.

== Seeds ==
1. (Argentina) Juan Pablo Ficovich (semifinals)
2. (Colombia) Nicolás Mejía (champion)
3. (Mexico) Rodrigo Pacheco Méndez (first round)
4. (Kazakhstan) Dmitry Popko (first round, retired)
5. (Argentina) Santiago Rodríguez Taverna (second round)
6. (Bolivia) Murkel Dellien (quarterfinals)
7. (United States) Garrett Johns (first round)
8. (United States) Stefan Kozlov (quarterfinals)

== Draw ==
Key

- Q = Qualifier
- WC = Wild card
- LL = Lucky loser
- Alt = Alternate
- ITF = ITF entry
- PR = Protected ranking
- SR = Special ranking
- SE = Special exempt
- JE = Junior exempt
- JR = Junior Accelerator Programme entrant
- CO = College Accelerator Programme entrant
- NG = Next Gen Accelerator Program entrant
- w/o = Walkover
- r = Retired
- d = Defaulted

=== Finals ===
Semifinals
1	(Argentina) Juan Pablo Ficovich	7^{7}	2	4
Q	(Colombia) Juan Sebastián Gómez	6^{5}	6	6
(Argentina) Facundo Mena	6^{6}	6	2
2	(Colombia) Nicolás Mejía	7^{8}	1	6

Final
Q	(Colombia) Juan Sebastián Gómez	4	4
2	(Colombia) Nicolás Mejía	6	6

=== Top half ===
First round
1	(Argentina) JP Ficovich	6	3	6
(Brazil) M Alves	4	6	3
WC	(Colombia) Salvador Price	4	2
(United States) Tristan McCormick	6	6
(Brazil) PA Saraiva dos Santos	6	2	4
Q	(Colombia) N Barrientos	3	6	6
(Mexico) A Hernández	7^{7}	6
7	(United States) G Johns	6^{4}	2
4	(Kazakhstan) D Popko	6	1^{r}
Q	(United States) K Poling	3	4
WC	(Colombia) Samuel Heredia	1	5
Q	(Colombia) JS Gómez	6	7
(Spain) D Jordà Sanchis	6	6
LL	(South Korea) G Campaña Lee	3	1
(Argentina) JB Torres	0	6	3
8	(United States) S Kozlov	6	4	6

Second round
1	(Argentina) JP Ficovich	6	3	6
(United States) T McCormick	1	6	3
Q	(Colombia) N Barrientos	6	6
(Mexico) A Hernández	3	4
Q	(United States) K Poling	7	3	2
Q	(Colombia) JS Gómez	5	6	6
(Spain) D Jordà Sanchis	4	4
8	(United States) S Kozlov	6	6

Quarterfinals
1	(Argentina) JP Ficovich	6	6
Q	(Colombia) N Barrientos	2	2
Q	(Colombia) JS Gómez	4	6	7
8	(United States) S Kozlov	6	4	5

Semifinals
1	(Argentina) JP Ficovich	7^{7}	2	4
Q	(Colombia) JS Gómez	6^{5}	6	6

=== Bottom half ===
First round
6	(Bolivia) M Dellien	6	6
(Canada) D Martin	3	2
Q	(Mexico) A Magadán	1	1
Q	(Dominican Republic) P Bertran	6	6
(United States) Maxwell McKennon	6	2	6
Q	(United States) Ryan Dickerson	3	6	4
(Argentina) F Mena	6	6
3	(Mexico) R Pacheco Méndez	4	3
5	(Argentina) S Rodríguez Taverna	6^{5}	6	6
WC	(Colombia) Samuel Alejandro Linde Palacios	7^{7}	3	1
(Peru) JP Varillas	6	6
(Argentina) Lorenzo Joaquín Rodríguez	2	4
(Spain) Àlex Martínez	6	6
Alt	(Colombia) Miguel Tobón	4	1
(Romania) Sebastian Gima	3	6^{2}
2	(Colombia) N Mejía	6	7^{7}

Second round
6	(Bolivia) M Dellien	6	6
Q	(Dominican Republic) P Bertran	4	4
(United States) M McKennon	3	4
(Argentina) F Mena	6	6
5	(Argentina) S Rodríguez Taverna	4	6^{3}
(Peru) JP Varillas	6	7^{7}
(Spain) À Martínez	3	2
2	(Colombia) N Mejía	6	6

Quarterfinals
6	(Bolivia) M Dellien	2	4
(Argentina) F Mena	6	6
(Peru) JP Varillas	6^{5}	2
2	(Colombia) N Mejía	7^{7}	6

Semifinals
(Argentina) F Mena	6^{6}	6	2
2	(Colombia) N Mejía	7^{8}	1	6
