= 2016 Claro Open Barranquilla – Doubles =

Doubles
- 2016 Claro Open Barranquilla

Final
- Champions: (Colombia) Alejandro Falla (Colombia) Eduardo Struvay
- Runners-up: (Ecuador) Gonzalo Escobar (Ecuador) Roberto Quiroz
- Score: 6–4, 7–5

Events
Singles	Doubles
- Claro Open Barranquilla

Marcelo Arévalo and Sergio Galdós were the defending champions, but only Arévalo decided to defend his title, partnering Darian King. Arévalo lost in the quarterfinals to Alejandro Falla and Eduardo Struvay.

Alejandro Falla and Eduardo Struvay won the title after defeating Gonzalo Escobar and Roberto Quiroz 6–4, 7–5 in the final.

== Seeds ==
1. (Argentina) Facundo Argüello / (Venezuela) Luis David Martínez (first round)
2. (Brazil) Fernando Romboli / (Brazil) Caio Zampieri (semifinals)
3. (El Salvador) Marcelo Arévalo / (Barbados) Darian King (quarterfinals)
4. (Dominican Republic) José Hernández / (Chile) Juan Carlos Sáez (quarterfinals)

== Draw ==
Key

- Q = Qualifier
- WC = Wild card
- LL = Lucky loser
- Alt = Alternate
- ITF = ITF entry
- PR = Protected ranking
- SR = Special ranking
- SE = Special exempt
- JE = Junior exempt
- JR = Junior Accelerator Programme entrant
- CO = College Accelerator Programme entrant
- NG = Next Gen Accelerator Program entrant
- w/o = Walkover
- r = Retired
- d = Defaulted

First round
1	(Argentina) F Argüello (Venezuela) LD Martínez	4	1
(Argentina) Maximiliano Estévez (Argentina) JI Londero	6	6
(Brazil) D Dutra da Silva (Brazil) R Hocevar	7	7^{9}
WC	(Argentina) Gregorio Cordonnier (Colombia) JS Gómez	5	6^{7}
4	(Dominican Republic) J Hernández (Chile) JC Sáez	6	6
(United States) A El Mihdawy (Brazil) B Sant'Anna	1	3
(Ecuador) G Escobar (Ecuador) R Quiroz	6	6
(Colombia) José Daniel Bendeck (Colombia) A González	2	2
(Colombia) A Falla (Colombia) E Struvay	6	7
WC	(Colombia) C Rodríguez (Venezuela) R Rodríguez	0	5
(Mexico) D Garza (Mexico) T Hank	0	2
3	(El Salvador) M Arévalo (Barbados) D King	6	6
(Argentina) F Mena (Argentina) A Velotti	4	7	[10]
(Brazil) JP Sorgi (Brazil) M Zormann	6	5	[8]
WC	(Colombia) Felipe Mantilla (Colombia) Juan Montes	4	1
2	(Brazil) F Romboli (Brazil) C Zampieri	6	6

Quarterfinals
(Argentina) M Estévez (Argentina) JI Londero	3	1
(Brazil) D Dutra da Silva (Brazil) R Hocevar	6	6
4	(Dominican Republic) J Hernández (Chile) JC Sáez	1	2
(Ecuador) G Escobar (Ecuador) R Quiroz	6	6
(Colombia) A Falla (Colombia) E Struvay	6	4	[10]
3	(El Salvador) M Arévalo (Barbados) D King	3	6	[7]
(Argentina) F Mena (Argentina) A Velotti	0	1
2	(Brazil) F Romboli (Brazil) C Zampieri	6	6

Semifinals
(Brazil) D Dutra da Silva (Brazil) R Hocevar	2	4
(Ecuador) G Escobar (Ecuador) R Quiroz	6	6
(Colombia) A Falla (Colombia) E Struvay	6	6
2	(Brazil) F Romboli (Brazil) C Zampieri	3	0

Final
(Ecuador) G Escobar (Ecuador) R Quiroz	4	5
(Colombia) A Falla (Colombia) E Struvay	6	7
