= 2013 Seguros Bolívar Open Barranquilla – Doubles =

Doubles
- 2013 Seguros Bolívar Open Barranquilla

Final
- Champions: (Argentina) Facundo Bagnis (Argentina) Federico Delbonis
- Runners-up: (Brazil) Fabiano de Paula (Italy) Stefano Ianni
- Score: 6–3, 7–5

Events
Singles	Doubles
← 2012 ·	Seguros Bolívar Open Barranquilla	· 2014 →

Nicholas Monroe and Maciek Sykut were the defending champions but decided not to participate.
Facundo Bagnis and Federico Delbonis defeated Fabiano de Paula and Stefano Ianni 6–3, 7–5 in the final to win the title.

== Seeds ==
1. (Argentina) Facundo Bagnis / (Argentina) Federico Delbonis (champions)
2. (Brazil) Fabiano de Paula / (Italy) Stefano Ianni (final)
3. (Argentina) Renzo Olivo / (Argentina) Marco Trungelliti (quarterfinals)
4. (Chile) Jorge Aguilar / (Ecuador) Julio César Campozano (first round)

== Draw ==
=== Key ===
- Q = Qualifier
- WC = Wild card
- LL = Lucky loser
- Alt = Alternate
- ITF = ITF entry
- PR = Protected ranking
- SR = Special ranking
- SE = Special exempt
- JE = Junior exempt
- JR = Junior Accelerator Programme entrant
- CO = College Accelerator Programme entrant
- NG = Next Gen Accelerator Program entrant
- w/o = Walkover
- r = Retired
- d = Defaulted

=== Draw ===
First round
1	(Argentina) F Bagnis (Argentina) F Delbonis	6	6
WC	(Colombia) Jhan Fontalvo Silva (Colombia) Francisco Franco	1	0
(Dominican Republic) V Estrella (Italy) R Ghedin	6	6
(France) J Dasnières de Veigy (France) Laurent Rochette	1	4
3	(Argentina) R Olivo (Argentina) M Trungelliti	4	6	[10]
(Croatia) T Androić (Croatia) D Marcan	6	4	[6]
WC	(Colombia) N Barrientos (Colombia) E Struvay	6	6
(France) Florian Reynet (France) M Teixeira	4	3
WC	(Colombia) Felipe Escobar (Colombia) Felipe Mantilla	4	2
(Uruguay) M Felder (Argentina) DS Schwartzman	6	6
(Colombia) A González (Italy) C Grassi	6	6
4	(Chile) J Aguilar (Ecuador) JC Campozano	3	2
(Germany) G Kretschmer (Germany) A Satschko	6^{4}	5
(Georgia (country)) N Basilashvili (Colombia) C Salamanca	7^{7}	7
(Czech Republic) M Michalička (United States) W Odesnik	2	4
2	(Brazil) F de Paula (Italy) S Ianni	6	6

Quarterfinals
1	(Argentina) F Bagnis (Argentina) F Delbonis	w/o
(Dominican Republic) V Estrella (Italy) R Ghedin
3	(Argentina) R Olivo (Argentina) M Trungelliti	6^{5}	3
WC	(Colombia) N Barrientos (Colombia) E Struvay	7^{7}	6
(Uruguay) M Felder (Argentina) DS Schwartzman	6^{8}	7	[10]
(Colombia) A González (Italy) C Grassi	7^{10}	5	[6]
(Georgia (country)) N Basilashvili (Colombia) C Salamanca	5	0
2	(Brazil) F de Paula (Italy) S Ianni	7	6

Semifinals
1	(Argentina) F Bagnis (Argentina) F Delbonis	6	4
WC	(Colombia) N Barrientos (Colombia) E Struvay	3	1^{r}
(Uruguay) M Felder (Argentina) DS Schwartzman	4	6	[4]
2	(Brazil) F de Paula (Italy) S Ianni	6	3	[10]

Final
1	(Argentina) F Bagnis (Argentina) F Delbonis	6	7
2	(Brazil) F de Paula (Italy) S Ianni	3	5
