= 2025 Challenger Seguros del Estado – Doubles =

Doubles
- 2025 Challenger Seguros del Estado

Final
- Champions: (Venezuela) Luis David Martínez (Colombia) Cristian Rodríguez
- Runners-up: (Colombia) Nicolás Barrientos (United States) Benjamin Kittay
- Score: 6–1, 6–4

Events
Singles	Doubles
- Challenger Seguros del Estado

This was the first edition of the tournament.

Luis David Martínez and Cristian Rodríguez won the title after defeating Nicolás Barrientos and Benjamin Kittay 6–1, 6–4 in the final.

== Seeds ==
1. (Ecuador) Gonzalo Escobar / (Mexico) Miguel Ángel Reyes-Varela (quarterfinals)
2. (Venezuela) Luis David Martínez / (Colombia) Cristian Rodríguez (champions)
3. (Colombia) Nicolás Barrientos / (United States) Benjamin Kittay (final)
4. (Brazil) Mateus Alves / (Antigua and Barbuda) Jody Maginley (first round)

== Draw ==
Key

- Q = Qualifier
- WC = Wild card
- LL = Lucky loser
- Alt = Alternate
- ITF = ITF entry
- PR = Protected ranking
- SR = Special ranking
- SE = Special exempt
- JE = Junior exempt
- JR = Junior Accelerator Programme entrant
- CO = College Accelerator Programme entrant
- NG = Next Gen Accelerator Program entrant
- w/o = Walkover
- r = Retired
- d = Defaulted

First round
1	(Ecuador) G Escobar (Mexico) M Reyes-Varela	6	6
Alt	(United States) S Kozlov (Argentina) S Rodríguez Taverna	4	2
PR	(Colombia) JS Gómez (Colombia) Johan Alexander Rodríguez	6^{4}	6^{2}
(Mexico) A Magadán (United States) K Poling	7^{7}	7^{7}
3	(Colombia) N Barrientos (United States) B Kittay	7^{7}	6
(Venezuela) Juan José Bianchi (Venezuela) B Pérez	6^{4}	3
(Argentina) Valentín Basel (Argentina) F Ribero	7^{7}	4	[10]
(United States) Tristan McCormick (Brazil) PA Saraiva dos Santos	6^{5}	6	[3]
WC	(United States) Ryan Dickerson (Romania) Sebastian Gima	3	6	[10]
WC	(Colombia) Juan Sebastián Osorio (Colombia) Salvador Price	6	3	[8]
Alt	(Colombia) Samuel Heredia (Colombia) Miguel Tobón	5	6	[10]
4	(Brazil) M Alves (Antigua and Barbuda) J Maginley	7	3	[5]
(Argentina) Thiago Cigarrán (Argentina) Lorenzo Joaquín Rodríguez	6	7^{7}
(Spain) Àlex Martínez (United States) Maxwell McKennon	3	6^{3}
(Mexico) A Hernández (Mexico) M Sánchez	4	6^{4}
2	(Venezuela) LD Martínez (Colombia) C Rodríguez	6	7^{7}

Quarterfinals
1	(Ecuador) G Escobar (Mexico) M Reyes-Varela	3	6	[11]
(Mexico) A Magadán (United States) K Poling	6	3	[13]
3	(Colombia) N Barrientos (United States) B Kittay	6	7^{7}
(Argentina) V Basel (Argentina) F Ribero	4	6^{3}
WC	(United States) R Dickerson (Romania) S Gima	6	3	[16]
Alt	(Colombia) S Heredia (Colombia) M Tobón	3	6	[14]
(Argentina) T Cigarrán (Argentina) LJ Rodríguez	4	4
2	(Venezuela) LD Martínez (Colombia) C Rodríguez	6	6

Semifinals
(Mexico) A Magadán (United States) K Poling	7^{7}	4	[10]
3	(Colombia) N Barrientos (United States) B Kittay	6^{4}	6	[12]
WC	(United States) R Dickerson (Romania) S Gima	6^{4}	5
2	(Venezuela) LD Martínez (Colombia) C Rodríguez	7^{7}	7

Final
3	(Colombia) N Barrientos (United States) B Kittay	1	4
2	(Venezuela) LD Martínez (Colombia) C Rodríguez	6	6
