= 2025 Stockholm Open – Singles =

Singles
- 2025 Stockholm Open

Final
- Champion: (Norway) Casper Ruud
- Runner-up: (France) Ugo Humbert
- Score: 6–2, 6–3

Details
- Draw: 28 (4 Q / 3 WC)
- Seeds: 8

Events
| Singles | Doubles |
- Stockholm Open

Casper Ruud defeated Ugo Humbert in the final, 6–2, 6–3 to win the singles title at the 2025 Stockholm Open. It was his 14th ATP Tour title.

Tommy Paul was the reigning champion, but withdrew before the tournament began due to injury.

== Seeds ==
The top four seeds received a bye into the second round.

1. (Denmark) Holger Rune (semifinals, retired)
2. (Norway) Casper Ruud (champion)
3. (Canada) Denis Shapovalov (semifinals)
4. (France) Ugo Humbert (final)
5. (Netherlands) Tallon Griekspoor (first round)
6. (France) Alexandre Müller (first round)
7. (Australia) Alexei Popyrin (first round)
8. (Argentina) Camilo Ugo Carabelli (first round, retired)

== Draw ==
Key

- Q = Qualifier
- WC = Wild card
- LL = Lucky loser
- Alt = Alternate
- ITF = ITF entry
- PR = Protected ranking
- SR = Special ranking
- SE = Special exempt
- JE = Junior exempt
- JR = Junior Accelerator Programme entrant
- CO = College Accelerator Programme entrant
- NG = Next Gen Accelerator Program entrant
- w/o = Walkover
- r = Retired
- d = Defaulted

=== Finals ===
Semifinals
1 | (Denmark) Holger Rune | 6 | 2^{r}
4 | (France) Ugo Humbert | 4 | 2
3 | (Canada) Denis Shapovalov | 3 | 4
2 | (Norway) Casper Ruud | 6 | 6

Final
4 | (France) Ugo Humbert | 2 | 3
2 | (Norway) Casper Ruud | 6 | 6

=== Top half ===
First round
(Netherlands) J de Jong | 1 | 2
(Hungary) M Fucsovics | 6 | 6
Q | (Estonia) M Lajal | 6^{5} | 7^{7} | 3
(Argentina) TM Etcheverry | 7^{7} | 6^{5} | 6
(Serbia) M Kecmanović | 6 | 6
6 | (France) A Müller | 4 | 1
(Italy) M Berrettini | 6 | 6
Q | (Italy) G Zeppieri | 4 | 2
Q | (United Kingdom) A Fery | 4 | 2
(Italy) L Sonego | 6 | 6
(United States) A Kovacevic | 4 | 7 | 4
8 | (Argentina) C Ugo Carabelli | 6 | 5 | 0^{r}

Second round
1 | (Denmark) H Rune | 6 | 6
(Hungary) M Fucsovics | 4 | 4
(Argentina) TM Etcheverry | 6 | 4 | 6
(Serbia) M Kecmanović | 4 | 6 | 3
4 | (France) U Humbert | 7^{7} | 6
(Italy) M Berrettini | 6^{5} | 3
(Italy) L Sonego | 7^{7} | 6
(United States) A Kovacevic | 6^{3} | 1

Quarterfinals
1 | (Denmark) H Rune | 6^{4} | 6 | 6
(Argentina) TM Etcheverry | 7^{7} | 3 | 4
4 | (France) U Humbert | 6^{3} | 6 | 6
(Italy) L Sonego | 7^{7} | 0 | 3

Semifinals
1 | (Denmark) H Rune | 6 | 2^{r}
4 | (France) U Humbert | 4 | 2

=== Bottom half ===
First round
5 | (Netherlands) T Griekspoor | 3 | 7^{8} | 6^{5}
(United Kingdom) J Fearnley | 6 | 6^{6} | 7^{7}
WC | (Sweden) E Ymer | 6 | 7^{7}
WC | (Sweden) M Ymer | 2 | 6^{4}
WC | (Sweden) L Borg | 6 | 6
PR | (Austria) S Ofner | 3 | 4
7 | (Australia) A Popyrin | 7^{7} | 1 | 3
(United States) S Korda | 6^{4} | 6 | 6
(Poland) K Majchrzak | 6 | 6
Q | (Austria) F Misolic | 2 | 2
NG | (Norway) N Budkov Kjær | 5 | 3
(Croatia) M Čilić | 7 | 6

Second round
(United Kingdom) J Fearnley | 2 | 2
WC | (Sweden) E Ymer | 6 | 6
WC | (Sweden) L Borg | 2 | 7 | 1
3 | (Canada) D Shapovalov | 6 | 5 | 6
(United States) S Korda | 6 | 4 | 7
(Poland) K Majchrzak | 4 | 6 | 5
(Croatia) M Čilić | 6^{2} | 4
2 | (Norway) C Ruud | 7^{7} | 6

Quarterfinals
WC | (Sweden) E Ymer | 4 | 7^{7} | 1
3 | (Canada) D Shapovalov | 6 | 6^{3} | 6
(United States) S Korda | 7^{7} | 4 | 4
2 | (Norway) C Ruud | 6^{5} | 6 | 6

Semifinals
3 | (Canada) D Shapovalov | 3 | 4
2 | (Norway) C Ruud | 6 | 6

== Qualifying ==
=== Seeds ===
1. (United States) Ethan Quinn (qualifying competition)
2. (Austria) Filip Misolic (qualified)
3. (Peru) Ignacio Buse (first round)
4. (Croatia) Dino Prižmić (first round, retired)
5. (Italy) Matteo Gigante (first round, retired)
6. (Estonia) Mark Lajal (qualified)
7. (Italy) Giulio Zeppieri (qualified)
8. (United Kingdom) Jay Clarke (qualifying competition)

=== Qualifiers ===
1. (Estonia) Mark Lajal
2. (Austria) Filip Misolic
3. (United Kingdom) Arthur Fery
4. (Italy) Giulio Zeppieri

=== Qualifying draw ===
==== First qualifier ====
First round
1 | (United States) Ethan Quinn | 6 | 6
WC | (Sweden) Nikola Slavic | 3 | 2
(Japan) Rei Sakamoto | 1 | 4
6 | (Estonia) Mark Lajal | 6 | 6

Qualifying competition
1 | (United States) Ethan Quinn | 6 | 4 | 4
6 | (Estonia) Mark Lajal | 3 | 6 | 6

==== Second qualifier ====
First round
2 | (Austria) Filip Misolic | 6^{4} | 6 | 6
WC | (Sweden) William Rejchtman Vinciguerra | 7^{7} | 4 | 4
(Norway) Viktor Durasovic | 4
5 | (Italy) Matteo Gigante | 2^{r}

Qualifying competition
2 | (Austria) Filip Misolic | 6 | 3 | 7^{7}
(Norway) Viktor Durasovic | 3 | 6 | 6^{4}

==== Third qualifier ====
First round
3 | (Peru) Ignacio Buse | 3 | 1
(United Kingdom) Arthur Fery | 6 | 6
(France) Sascha Gueymard Wayenburg | 6 | 6^{4} | 3
8 | (United Kingdom) Jay Clarke | 3 | 7^{7} | 6

Qualifying competition
(United Kingdom) Arthur Fery | 6 | 4 | 6
8 | (United Kingdom) Jay Clarke | 2 | 6 | 3

==== Fourth qualifier ====
First round
4 | (Croatia) Dino Prižmić | 6 | 2^{r}
Alt | (Germany) Patrick Zahraj | 1 | 3
(Ukraine) Vitaliy Sachko | 2 | 4
7 | (Italy) Giulio Zeppieri | 6 | 6

Qualifying competition
Alt | (Germany) Patrick Zahraj | 1 | 4
7 | (Italy) Giulio Zeppieri | 6 | 6
