= 2025 Kia Open Barranquilla – Singles =

Singles
- 2025 Kia Open Barranquilla

Final
- Champion: (United Kingdom) Arthur Fery
- Runner-up: (Australia) Bernard Tomic
- Score: Walkover

Events
Singles	Doubles
- Kia Open Barranquilla

Diego Schwartzman was the defending champion from the last time the tournament was held in 2016 but was unable to defend his title as he had retired from professional tennis in February.

Arthur Fery won the title after Bernard Tomic withdrew before the final to concentrate on attempting to qualify for the 2025 US Open.

== Seeds ==
1. (Argentina) Juan Pablo Ficovich (semifinals)
2. (Chile) Tomás Barrios Vera (quarterfinals)
3. (Australia) Bernard Tomic (final, withdrew)
4. (Argentina) Santiago Rodríguez Taverna (first round)
5. (Ukraine) Vitaliy Sachko (second round)
6. (Colombia) Nicolás Mejía (quarterfinals)
7. (Spain) Pol Martín Tiffon (first round)
8. (Paraguay) Daniel Vallejo (first round)

== Draw ==
Key

- Q = Qualifier
- WC = Wild card
- LL = Lucky loser
- Alt = Alternate
- ITF = ITF entry
- PR = Protected ranking
- SR = Special ranking
- SE = Special exempt
- JE = Junior exempt
- JR = Junior Accelerator Programme entrant
- CO = College Accelerator Programme entrant
- NG = Next Gen Accelerator Program entrant
- w/o = Walkover
- r = Retired
- d = Defaulted

=== Finals ===
Semifinals
1	(Argentina) Juan Pablo Ficovich	3	3
(United Kingdom) Arthur Fery	6	6
3	(Australia) Bernard Tomic	4	6	6
Alt	(Colombia) Johan Alexander Rodríguez	6	4	3

Final
(United Kingdom) Arthur Fery	w/o
3	(Australia) Bernard Tomic

=== Top half ===
First round
1	(Argentina) JP Ficovich	7^{7}	6
Alt	(Brazil) PA Saraiva dos Santos	6^{3}	0
WC	(Colombia) Samuel Heredia	6	1	3
(Dominican Republic) P Bertran	3	6	6
(United States) A Perez	6	7^{7}
(Canada) D Martin	4	6^{3}
Q	(United States) B Kuzuhara	4	6	6
7	(Spain) P Martín Tiffon	6	4	1
4	(Argentina) S Rodríguez Taverna	6	4	4
(United States) C Kingsley	4	6	6
Q	(United States) Jacob Brumm	5	4
Alt	(Colombia) JS Gómez	7	6
(United Kingdom) A Fery	7	6
PR	(Barbados) D King	5	3
WC	(Colombia) Miguel Tobón	6	6
8	(Paraguay) AD Vallejo	3	4

Second round
1	(Argentina) JP Ficovich	6	6
(Dominican Republic) P Bertran	3	1
(United States) A Perez	5	6	6
Q	(United States) B Kuzuhara	7	4	4
(United States) C Kingsley	7	6
Alt	(Colombia) JS Gómez	5	2
(United Kingdom) A Fery	6	6
WC	(Colombia) M Tobón	4	2

Quarterfinals
1	(Argentina) JP Ficovich	6	6
(United States) A Perez	3	1
(United States) C Kingsley	4	4
(United Kingdom) A Fery	6	6

Semifinals
1	(Argentina) JP Ficovich	3	3
(United Kingdom) A Fery	6	6

=== Bottom half ===
First round
6	(Colombia) N Mejía	7^{7}	3
(United States) A Ganesan	6^{3}	0^{r}
(Colombia) A Soriano Barrera	6^{7}	6	3
Q	(United States) J Sheehy	7^{9}	4	6
Q	(Argentina) F Bagnis	6	6^{2}	6
(United States) Felix Corwin	3	7^{7}	3
Q	(Morocco) T Baadi	3	1
3	(Australia) B Tomic	6	6
5	(Ukraine) V Sachko	7	3	6
(Dominican Republic) R Cid Subervi	5	6	3
Alt	(Colombia) Johan Alexander Rodríguez	6	6
Q	(United States) N Schachter	1	2
(Ecuador) A Andrade	7	6
WC	(Colombia) Samuel Alejandro Linde Palacios	5	2
(Japan) Kenta Miyoshi	1	5
2	(Chile) T Barrios Vera	6	7

Second round
6	(Colombia) N Mejía	6	6^{2}	6
Q	(United States) J Sheehy	1	7^{7}	4
Q	(Argentina) F Bagnis
3	(Australia) B Tomic	w/o
5	(Ukraine) V Sachko	3	2
Alt	(Colombia) JA Rodríguez	6	6
(Ecuador) A Andrade	2	1
2	(Chile) T Barrios Vera	6	6

Quarterfinals
6	(Colombia) N Mejía	7^{7}	3	4
3	(Australia) B Tomic	6^{5}	6	6
Alt	(Colombia) JA Rodríguez	7^{7}	7
2	(Chile) T Barrios Vera	6^{5}	5

Semifinals
3	(Australia) B Tomic	4	6	6
Alt	(Colombia) JA Rodríguez	6	4	3
