= 2016 Claro Open Barranquilla – Singles =

Singles
- 2016 Claro Open Barranquilla

Final
- Champion: (Argentina) Diego Schwartzman
- Runner-up: (Brazil) Rogério Dutra Silva
- Score: 6–4, 6–1

Events
Singles	Doubles
- Claro Open Barranquilla

Borna Ćorić was the defending champion but chose not to participate.

Diego Schwartzman won the title after defeating Rogério Dutra Silva 6–4, 6–1 in the final.

== Seeds ==
1. (Argentina) Diego Schwartzman (champion)
2. (Dominican Republic) Víctor Estrella Burgos (quarterfinals)
3. (Brazil) Rogério Dutra Silva (final)
4. (Colombia) Santiago Giraldo (semifinals)
5. (Argentina) Máximo González (semifinals)
6. (Colombia) Alejandro González (quarterfinals)
7. (Barbados) Darian King (first round)
8. (El Salvador) Marcelo Arévalo (second round)

== Draw ==
Key

- Q = Qualifier
- WC = Wild card
- LL = Lucky loser
- Alt = Alternate
- ITF = ITF entry
- PR = Protected ranking
- SR = Special ranking
- SE = Special exempt
- JE = Junior exempt
- JR = Junior Accelerator Programme entrant
- CO = College Accelerator Programme entrant
- NG = Next Gen Accelerator Program entrant
- w/o = Walkover
- r = Retired
- d = Defaulted

=== Finals ===
Semifinals
1	(Argentina) Diego Schwartzman	7	6
4/WC	(Colombia) Santiago Giraldo	5	2
3	(Brazil) Rogério Dutra Silva	6	6
5	(Argentina) Máximo González	3	1

Final
1	(Argentina) Diego Schwartzman	6	6
3	(Brazil) Rogério Dutra Silva	4	1

=== Top half ===
First round
1	(Argentina) D Schwartzman	6	6
(Argentina) JI Londero	2	4
(Argentina) F Argüello	6	4	4
Q	(Colombia) JS Gómez	3	6	6
(Dominican Republic) J Hernández	7	6
Q	(Brazil) B Sant'Anna	5	2
(Ecuador) R Quiroz	0	6	6
7	(Barbados) D King	6	3	2
4/WC	(Colombia) S Giraldo	6	6
(Brazil) R Hocevar	0	2
WC	(Argentina) Gregorio Cordonnier	4	1
(Colombia) A Falla	6	6
Alt	(Brazil) JP Sorgi	1	3
(Argentina) A Velotti	6	6
WC	(Colombia) José Daniel Bendeck	1	2
8	(El Salvador) M Arévalo	6	6

Second round
1	(Argentina) D Schwartzman	6	6
Q	(Colombia) JS Gómez	3	2
(Dominican Republic) J Hernández	7^{7}	4	6
(Ecuador) R Quiroz	6^{3}	6	2
4/WC	(Colombia) S Giraldo	6	3	7
(Colombia) A Falla	2	6	5
(Argentina) A Velotti	6	6
8	(El Salvador) M Arévalo	4	2

Quarterfinals
1	(Argentina) D Schwartzman	6	6
(Dominican Republic) J Hernández	1	0
4/WC	(Colombia) S Giraldo	6	6
(Argentina) A Velotti	0	4

Semifinals
1	(Argentina) D Schwartzman	7	6
4/WC	(Colombia) S Giraldo	5	2

=== Bottom half ===
First round
6	(Colombia) A González	6	6
Q	(France) G Mina	2	1
(Colombia) C Rodríguez	6	6
(Brazil) D Dutra da Silva	1	0
(Argentina) Maximiliano Estévez	6	1
(United States) A El Mihdawy	1	0^{r}
(Chile) JC Sáez	0	4
3	(Brazil) R Dutra Silva	6	6
5	(Argentina) M González	7^{7}	3	0
(Colombia) E Struvay	6^{3}	6	0^{r}
(Ecuador) G Escobar	4	5
(Argentina) F Mena	6	7
(Brazil) M Zormann	3	1
Q	(Brazil) F Romboli	6	6
(Brazil) C Zampieri	5^{r}
2/WC	(Dominican Republic) V Estrella Burgos	6

Second round
6	(Colombia) A González	1	6	6
(Colombia) C Rodríguez	6	1	2
(Argentina) M Estévez	1	0
3	(Brazil) R Dutra Silva	6	6
5	(Argentina) M González	6	6
(Argentina) F Mena	1	2
Q	(Brazil) F Romboli	6	2	2
2/WC	(Dominican Republic) V Estrella Burgos	4	6	6

Quarterfinals
6	(Colombia) A González	4	4
3	(Brazil) R Dutra Silva	6	6
5	(Argentina) M González	4	6	6
2/WC	(Dominican Republic) V Estrella Burgos	6	3	4

Semifinals
3	(Brazil) R Dutra Silva	6	6
5	(Argentina) M González	3	1
