= 2013 Seguros Bolívar Open Barranquilla =

- Date: 8–14 April
- Edition: 3rd
- Draw: 32S / 16D
- Prize money: $50,000+H
- Surface: Clay
- Location: Barranquilla, Colombia

Champions

Singles
- (Argentina) Federico Delbonis

Doubles
- (Argentina) Facundo Bagnis / (Argentina) Federico Delbonis
| ← 2012 · | Seguros Bolívar Open Barranquilla | · 2014 → |

The 2013 Seguros Bolívar Open Barranquilla was a professional tennis tournament played on clay courts. It was the third edition of the tournament which was part of the 2013 ATP Challenger Tour. It took place in Barranquilla, Colombia between 8 and 14 April 2013.

== Singles main draw entrants ==
=== Seeds ===
| Country | Player | Rank^{1} | Seed |
|---|---|---|---|
| COL | Santiago Giraldo | 77 | 1 |
| ARG | Federico Delbonis | 118 | 2 |
| USA | Wayne Odesnik | 120 | 3 |
| FRA | Jonathan Dasnières de Veigy | 146 | 4 |
| ARG | Diego Sebastián Schwartzman | 149 | 5 |
| COL | Alejandro González | 165 | 6 |
| CHI | Jorge Aguilar | 182 | 7 |
| ARG | Marco Trungelliti | 184 | 8 |

- ^{1} Rankings are as of April 1, 2013.

=== Other entrants ===
The following players received wildcards into the singles main draw:

- (Colombia) Felipe Escobar
- (Uruguay) Marcel Felder
- (Colombia) Felipe Mantilla
- (Colombia) Eduardo Struvay

The following player received entry using a protected ranking:

- (Dominican Republic) Víctor Estrella

The following players received entry from the qualifying draw:

- (Ecuador) Iván Endara
- (Italy) Claudio Grassi
- (Chile) Cristóbal Saavedra-Corvalán
- (Chile) Juan Carlos Sáez

== Doubles main draw entrants ==
=== Seeds ===
| Country | Player | Country | Player | Rank^{1} | Seed |
|---|---|---|---|---|---|
| ARG | Facundo Bagnis | ARG | Federico Delbonis | 330 | 1 |
| BRA | Fabiano de Paula | ITA | Stefano Ianni | 330 | 2 |
| ARG | Renzo Olivo | ARG | Marco Trungelliti | 331 | 3 |
| CHI | Jorge Aguilar | ECU | Julio César Campozano | 524 | 4 |

- ^{1} Rankings as of April 1, 2013.

=== Other entrants ===
The following pairs received wildcards into the doubles main draw:

- (Colombia) Nicolás Barrientos / (Colombia) Eduardo Struvay
- (Colombia) Jhan Fontalvo Silva / (Colombia) Francisco Franco
- (Colombia) Felipe Escobar / (Colombia) Felipe Mantilla

== Champions ==
=== Singles ===
- (Argentina) Federico Delbonis def. (Argentina) Facundo Bagnis, 6–3, 6–2

=== Doubles ===
- (Argentina) Facundo Bagnis / (Argentina) Federico Delbonis def. (Brazil) Fabiano de Paula / (Italy) Stefano Ianni, 6–3, 7–5
