= 2015 Seguros Bolívar Open Barranquilla =

- Date: 7–13 September
- Edition: 5th
- Draw: 32S / 16D
- Prize money: $50,000+H
- Surface: Clay
- Location: Barranquilla, Colombia

Champions

Singles
- (Croatia) Borna Ćorić

Doubles
- (El Salvador) Marcelo Arévalo / (Peru) Sergio Galdós
← 2014 ·	Seguros Bolívar Open Barranquilla	· 2016 →

The 2015 Seguros Bolívar Open Barranquilla was a professional tennis tournament played on clay courts. It was the fifth edition of the tournament which was part of the 2015 ATP Challenger Tour. It took place in Barranquilla, Colombia between 7 and 13 September 2015.

== Singles main-draw entrants ==
=== Seeds ===
Country	Player	Rank	Seed
CRO	Borna Ćorić	33	1
ESP	Marcel Granollers	77	2
BRA	João Souza	91	3
JPN	Taro Daniel	110	4
COL	Alejandro González	119	5
BRA	André Ghem	130	6
ARG	Máximo González	163	7
ARG	Nicolás Kicker	171	8

=== Other entrants ===
The following players received wildcards into the singles main draw:

- (Croatia) Borna Ćorić
- (Japan) Taro Daniel
- (Colombia) José Daniel Bendeck
- (Spain) Marcel Granollers

The following players received entry from the qualifying draw:

- (Peru) Mauricio Echazú
- (Colombia) Daniel Elahi Galán
- (Colombia) Felipe Mantilla
- (South Africa) Ruan Roelofse

== Doubles main-draw entrants ==
=== Seeds ===
Country	Player	Country	Player	Rank	Seed
MEX	César Ramírez	MEX	Miguel Ángel Reyes-Varela	221	1
RSA	Dean O'Brien	RSA	Ruan Roelofse	268	2
ARG	Guido Andreozzi	USA	Matt Seeberger	287	3
ESA	Marcelo Arévalo	PER	Sergio Galdós	407	4

=== Other entrants ===
The following pairs received wildcards into the doubles main draw:

- (Colombia) Felipe Escobar / (Colombia) Felipe Mantilla
- (Colombia) José Daniel Bendeck / (Colombia) Alejandro Gómez
- (Argentina) Gregorio Cordonnier / (Colombia) Juan Sebastián Gómez

== Champions ==
=== Singles ===
- (Croatia) Borna Ćorić def. (Brazil) Rogério Dutra Silva 6–4, 6–1

=== Doubles ===
- (El Salvador) Marcelo Arévalo / (Peru) Sergio Galdós def. (Peru) Duilio Beretta / (Peru) Mauricio Echazú 6–1, 6–4
