= 2011 Seguros Bolívar Open Barranquilla =

- Date: 28 March – 3 April
- Edition: 1st
- Location: Barranquilla, Colombia

Champions

Singles
- (Argentina) Facundo Bagnis

Doubles
- (Italy) Flavio Cipolla / (Italy) Paolo Lorenzi
Seguros Bolívar Open Barranquilla	· 2012 →

The 2011 Seguros Bolívar Open Barranquilla was a professional tennis tournament played on hard courts. It was the first edition of the tournament which was part of the 2011 ATP Challenger Tour. It took place in Barranquilla, Colombia between 28 March – 3 April 2011.

== ATP entrants ==
=== Seeds ===
Country	Player	Rank^{1}	Seed
RUS	Teymuraz Gabashvili	77	1
ARG	Horacio Zeballos	88	2
ARG	Brian Dabul	107	3
COL	Alejandro Falla	108	4
ARG	Eduardo Schwank	121	5
FRA	Éric Prodon	129	6
ITA	Paolo Lorenzi	154	7
ARG	Diego Junqueira	155	8

- Rankings are as of March 21, 2011.

=== Other entrants ===
The following players received wildcards into the singles main draw:

- (Argentina) Manuel Barros
- (Norway) Sander Brendmoe
- (Spain) Javier Martí
- (Brazil) Rogério Dutra da Silva

The following players received entry from the qualifying draw:

- (United States) Wayne Odesnik
- (Argentina) Marco Trungelliti
- (United States) Dennis Zivkovic
- (Argentina) Martín Vassallo Argüello

== Champions ==
=== Singles ===
(Argentina) Facundo Bagnis def. (Argentina) Diego Junqueira, 1–6, 7–6(4), 6–0

=== Doubles ===
(Italy) Flavio Cipolla / (Italy) Paolo Lorenzi def. (Colombia) Alejandro Falla / (Colombia) Eduardo Struvay, 6–3, 6–4
