= 2025 Stockholm Open =

Men's tennis tournament

- Date: 13–19 October
- Edition: 56th
- Category: ATP 250
- Draw: 28S / 16D
- Surface: Hard (indoor)
- Location: Stockholm, Sweden
- Venue: Kungliga tennishallen

Champions

Singles
- (Norway) Casper Ruud

Doubles
- (Austria) Alexander Erler / (United States) Robert Galloway
- Stockholm Open

The 2025 BNP Paribas Nordic Open was a professional men's tennis tournament played on indoor hard courts. It was the 56th edition of the tournament, and an ATP 250 event on the 2025 ATP Tour. It took place at the Kungliga tennishallen in Stockholm, Sweden from 13 to 19 October 2025.

== Champions ==
=== Singles ===
- (Norway) Casper Ruud def. (France) Ugo Humbert, 6–2, 6–3

=== Doubles ===
- (Austria) Alexander Erler / (United States) Robert Galloway def. (United States) Vasil Kirkov / (Netherlands) Bart Stevens, 6–3, 6–2

== Singles main-draw entrants ==
=== Seeds ===
Country	Player	Rank^{1}	Seed
DEN	Holger Rune	11	1
NOR	Casper Ruud	12	2
CAN	Denis Shapovalov	24	3
FRA	Ugo Humbert	26	4
NED	Tallon Griekspoor	31	5
FRA	Alexandre Müller	39	6
AUS	Alexei Popyrin	40	7
ARG	Camilo Ugo Carabelli	45	8

- Rankings are as of 29 September 2025.

=== Other entrants ===
The following players received wildcards into the singles main draw:

- (Sweden) Leo Borg
- (Sweden) Elias Ymer
- (Sweden) Mikael Ymer

The following player received a late entry into the singles main draw:

- (Denmark) Holger Rune

The following player received entry through the Next Gen Accelerator programme:

- (Norway) Nicolai Budkov Kjær

The following player received entry using a protected ranking into the singles main draw:

- (Austria) Sebastian Ofner

The following players received entry from the qualifying draw:

- (United Kingdom) Arthur Fery
- (Estonia) Mark Lajal
- (Austria) Filip Misolic
- (Italy) Giulio Zeppieri

=== Withdrawals ===
- (Bulgaria) Grigor Dimitrov → replaced by (United States) Sebastian Korda
- (United Kingdom) Cameron Norrie → replaced by (Netherlands) Jesper de Jong
- (United States) Tommy Paul → replaced by (United Kingdom) Jacob Fearnley

== Doubles main-draw entrants ==
=== Seeds ===
Country	Player	Country	Player	Rank^{1}	Seed
ITA	Simone Bolelli	ITA	Andrea Vavassori	29	1
POR	Francisco Cabral	AUT	Lucas Miedler	51	2
IND	Yuki Bhambri	AUS	John Peers	53	3
FRA	Sadio Doumbia	FRA	Fabien Reboul	54	4

- Rankings are as of 29 September 2025

=== Other entrants ===
The following pairs received wildcards into the doubles main draw:

- (Sweden) Leo Borg / (Sweden) Nikola Slavic
- (Sweden) Erik Grevelius / (Sweden) Adam Heinonen

The following pair received entry as alternates:

- (Netherlands) Jesper de Jong / (United States) Ethan Quinn

=== Withdrawals ===
- (Argentina) Tomás Martín Etcheverry / (Argentina) Camilo Ugo Carabelli → replaced by (Netherlands) Jesper de Jong / (United States) Ethan Quinn
