= 2025 Kia Open Barranquilla =

- Date: 11–16 August
- Edition: 7th
- Surface: Hard
- Location: Barranquilla, Colombia

Champions

Singles
- (United Kingdom) Arthur Fery

Doubles
- (United States) Benjamin Kittay / (Colombia) Cristian Rodríguez
- Kia Open Barranquilla

The 2025 Kia Open Barranquilla was a professional tennis tournament played on hard courts. It was the seventh edition of the tournament which was part of the 2025 ATP Challenger Tour. It took place in Barranquilla, Colombia between 11 and 16 August 2025.

== Singles main-draw entrants ==
=== Seeds ===
| Country | Player | Rank^{1} | Seed |
|---|---|---|---|
| ARG | Juan Pablo Ficovich | 127 | 1 |
| CHI | Tomás Barrios Vera | 131 | 2 |
| AUS | Bernard Tomic | 184 | 3 |
| ARG | Santiago Rodríguez Taverna | 190 | 4 |
| UKR | Vitaliy Sachko | 222 | 5 |
| COL | Nicolás Mejía | 238 | 6 |
| ESP | Pol Martín Tiffon | 243 | 7 |
| PAR | Daniel Vallejo | 245 | 8 |

- ^{1} Rankings as of 4 August 2025.

=== Other entrants ===
The following players received wildcards into the singles main draw:

- (Colombia) Samuel Heredia
- (Colombia) Samuel Alejandro Linde Palacios
- (Colombia) Miguel Tobón

The following player received entry into the singles main draw using a protected ranking:

- (Barbados) Darian King

The following players received entry into the singles main draw as alternates:

- (Colombia) Juan Sebastián Gómez
- (Colombia) Johan Alexander Rodríguez
- (Brazil) Paulo André Saraiva dos Santos

The following players received entry from the qualifying draw:

- (Morocco) Taha Baadi
- (Argentina) Facundo Bagnis
- (United States) Jacob Brumm
- (United States) Bruno Kuzuhara
- (United States) Noah Schachter
- (United States) Joshua Sheehy

== Champions ==
=== Singles ===
- (United Kingdom) Arthur Fery def. (Australia) Bernard Tomic by walkover.

=== Doubles ===
- (United States) Benjamin Kittay / (Colombia) Cristian Rodríguez def. (Morocco) Taha Baadi / (Canada) Dan Martin 6–2, 6–4.
