= 2025 Challenger Seguros del Estado =

- Date: 24 – 30 November
- Edition: 1st
- Surface: Clay
- Location: Bogotá, Colombia

Champions

Singles
- (Colombia) Nicolás Mejía

Doubles
- (Venezuela) Luis David Martínez / (Colombia) Cristian Rodríguez
- Challenger Seguros del Estado

The 2025 Challenger Seguros del Estado was a professional tennis tournament played on clay courts. It was the first edition of the tournament which was part of the 2025 ATP Challenger Tour. It took place in Bogotá, Colombia between 24 and 30 November 2025.

== Singles main-draw entrants ==
=== Seeds ===
Country	Player	Rank^{1}	Seed
ARG	Juan Pablo Ficovich	164	1
COL	Nicolás Mejía	212	2
MEX	Rodrigo Pacheco Méndez	216	3
KAZ	Dmitry Popko	227	4
ARG	Santiago Rodríguez Taverna	235	5
BOL	Murkel Dellien	265	6
USA	Garrett Johns	279	7
USA	Stefan Kozlov	306	8

- ^{1} Rankings are as of 17 November 2025.

=== Other entrants ===
The following players received wildcards into the singles main draw:

- (Colombia) Samuel Heredia
- (Colombia) Samuel Alejandro Linde Palacios
- (Colombia) Salvador Price

The following player received entry into the singles main draw as an alternate:

- (Colombia) Miguel Tobón

The following players received entry from the qualifying draw:

- (Colombia) Nicolás Barrientos
- (Dominican Republic) Peter Bertran
- (United States) Ryan Dickerson
- (Colombia) Juan Sebastián Gómez
- (Mexico) Alan Magadán
- (United States) Karl Poling

The following player received entry as a lucky loser:

- (South Korea) Gerard Campaña Lee

== Champions ==
=== Singles ===
- (Colombia) Nicolás Mejía def. (Colombia) Juan Sebastián Gómez 6–4, 6–4.

=== Doubles ===
- (Venezuela) Luis David Martínez / (Colombia) Cristian Rodríguez def. (Colombia) Nicolás Barrientos / (United States) Benjamin Kittay 6–1, 6–4.
