= 2015 Seguros Bolívar Open Barranquilla – Doubles =

Doubles
- 2015 Seguros Bolívar Open Barranquilla

Final
- Champions: (El Salvador) Marcelo Arévalo (Peru) Sergio Galdós
- Runners-up: (Peru) Duilio Beretta (Peru) Mauricio Echazú
- Score: 6–1, 6–4

Events
Singles	Doubles
- Seguros Bolívar Open Barranquilla

Pablo Cuevas and Pere Riba are the defending champions, but chose not to participate.

== Seeds ==
1. (Mexico) César Ramírez / (Mexico) Miguel Ángel Reyes-Varela (semifinals)
2. (South Africa) Dean O'Brien / (South Africa) Ruan Roelofse (semifinals)
3. (Argentina) Guido Andreozzi / (United States) Matt Seeberger (first round)
4. (El Salvador) Marcelo Arévalo / (Peru) Sergio Galdós (champions)

== Draw ==
Key

- Q = Qualifier
- WC = Wild card
- LL = Lucky loser
- Alt = Alternate
- ITF = ITF entry
- PR = Protected ranking
- SR = Special ranking
- SE = Special exempt
- JE = Junior exempt
- JR = Junior Accelerator Programme entrant
- CO = College Accelerator Programme entrant
- NG = Next Gen Accelerator Program entrant
- w/o = Walkover
- r = Retired
- d = Defaulted

First round
1	(Mexico) C Ramírez (Mexico) MÁ Reyes-Varela	w/o
(Argentina) N Kicker (Argentina) F Mena
WC	(Colombia) Felipe Escobar (Colombia) Felipe Mantilla	w/o
(Brazil) R Dutra Silva (Brazil) J Souza
4	(El Salvador) M Arévalo (Peru) S Galdós	6	6
WC	(Colombia) Jose Daniel Bendeck (Colombia) A Gómez	3	1
(Japan) T Daniel (Brazil) A Ghem	6	6^{3}	[10]
WC	(Argentina) Gregorio Cordonnier (Colombia) JS Gómez	2	7^{7}	[5]
(United States) A El Mihdawy (Ecuador) I Endara	4	6	[10]
(Ecuador) G Lapentti (Argentina) JI Londero	6	3	[4]
Alt	(Peru) D Beretta (Peru) M Echazú	6	6
3	(Argentina) G Andreozzi (United States) M Seeberger	4	4
(Brazil) Wilson Leite (Sweden) C Lindell	6	3	[4]
(Ecuador) G Escobar (Ecuador) E Gómez	3	6	[10]
(Venezuela) LD Martínez (Colombia) E Struvay	7^{7}	2	[8]
2	(South Africa) D O'Brien (South Africa) R Roelofse	6^{5}	6	[10]

Quarterfinals
1	(Mexico) C Ramírez (Mexico) MÁ Reyes-Varela	6	6
WC	(Colombia) F Escobar (Colombia) F Mantilla	4	2
4	(El Salvador) M Arévalo (Peru) S Galdós	w/o
(Japan) T Daniel (Brazil) A Ghem
(United States) A El Mihdawy (Ecuador) I Endara	5	3
Alt	(Peru) D Beretta (Peru) M Echazú	7	6
(Ecuador) G Escobar (Ecuador) E Gómez	3	6	[7]
2	(South Africa) D O'Brien (South Africa) R Roelofse	6	2	[10]

Semifinals
1	(Mexico) C Ramírez (Mexico) MÁ Reyes-Varela	3	4
4	(El Salvador) M Arévalo (Peru) S Galdós	6	6
Alt	(Peru) D Beretta (Peru) M Echazú	6	3	[10]
2	(South Africa) D O'Brien (South Africa) R Roelofse	0	6	[7]

Final
4	(El Salvador) M Arévalo (Peru) S Galdós	6	6
Alt	(Peru) D Beretta (Peru) M Echazú	1	4
