= 2025 Stockholm Open – Doubles =

Doubles
- 2025 Stockholm Open

Final
- Champions: (Austria) Alexander Erler (United States) Robert Galloway
- Runners-up: (United States) Vasil Kirkov (Netherlands) Bart Stevens
- Score: 6–3, 6–2

Events
Singles	Doubles
← 2024 ·	Stockholm Open	· 2026 →

Alexander Erler and Robert Galloway defeated Vasil Kirkov and Bart Stevens in the final, 6–3, 6–2 to win the doubles tennis title at the 2025 Stockholm Open. They did not lose a set en route to the title.

Harri Heliövaara and Henry Patten were the reigning champions but did not participate this year.

== Seeds ==
1. (Italy) Simone Bolelli / (Italy) Andrea Vavassori (semifinals)
2. (Portugal) Francisco Cabral / (Austria) Lucas Miedler (quarterfinals)
3. (India) Yuki Bhambri / (Australia) John Peers (first round)
4. (France) Sadio Doumbia / (France) Fabien Reboul (quarterfinals)

== Draw ==
=== Key ===
- Q = Qualifier
- WC = Wild card
- LL = Lucky loser
- Alt = Alternate
- ITF = ITF entry
- PR = Protected ranking
- SR = Special ranking
- SE = Special exempt
- JE = Junior exempt
- JR = Junior Accelerator Programme entrant
- CO = College Accelerator Programme entrant
- NG = Next Gen Accelerator Program entrant
- w/o = Walkover
- r = Retired
- d = Defaulted

=== Draw ===
First round
1	(Italy) S Bolelli (Italy) A Vavassori	6	6
WC	(Sweden) E Grevelius (Sweden) A Heinonen	3	4
(Serbia) M Kecmanović (France) A Müller	6	7^{7}
(India) R Bopanna (Netherlands) T Griekspoor	4	6^{4}
3	(India) Y Bhambri (Australia) J Peers	5	3
(Austria) A Erler (United States) R Galloway	7	6
(Austria) N Oberleitner (Austria) D Pichler	6	6
(Germany) H Jebens (Brazil) F Romboli	3	4
(United States) V Kirkov (Netherlands) B Stevens	6^{8}	6	[10]
Alt	(Netherlands) J de Jong (United States) E Quinn	7^{10}	1	[7]
(Sweden) A Göransson (United States) J Withrow	7^{7}	6^{6}	[5]
4	(France) S Doumbia (France) F Reboul	6^{2}	7^{8}	[10]
(Czech Republic) A Pavlásek (Poland) J Zieliński	6	7^{14}
(United States) R Cash (United States) JJ Tracy	4	6^{12}
WC	(Sweden) L Borg (Sweden) N Slavic	1	0
2	(Portugal) F Cabral (Austria) L Miedler	6	6

Quarterfinals
1	(Italy) S Bolelli (Italy) A Vavassori	4	6	[10]
(Serbia) M Kecmanović (France) A Müller	6	1	[5]
(Austria) A Erler (United States) R Galloway	6	7
(Austria) N Oberleitner (Austria) D Pichler	3	5
(United States) V Kirkov (Netherlands) B Stevens	6	3	[10]
4	(France) S Doumbia (France) F Reboul	2	6	[4]
(Czech Republic) A Pavlásek (Poland) J Zieliński	5	6	[10]
2	(Portugal) F Cabral (Austria) L Miedler	7	3	[7]

Semifinals
1	(Italy) S Bolelli (Italy) A Vavassori	6^{4}	6^{1}
(Austria) A Erler (United States) R Galloway	7^{7}	7^{7}
(United States) V Kirkov (Netherlands) B Stevens	6	3	[13]
(Czech Republic) A Pavlásek (Poland) J Zieliński	4	6	[11]

Final
(Austria) A Erler (United States) R Galloway	6	6
(United States) V Kirkov (Netherlands) B Stevens	3	2
