= 2011 Seguros Bolívar Open Barranquilla – Doubles =

Doubles
- 2011 Seguros Bolívar Open Barranquilla

Final
- Champions: (Italy) Flavio Cipolla (Italy) Paolo Lorenzi
- Runners-up: (Colombia) Alejandro Falla (Colombia) Eduardo Struvay
- Score: 6–3, 6–4

Events
Singles	Doubles
- Seguros Bolívar Open Barranquilla

Flavio Cipolla and Paolo Lorenzi won the first edition of the tournament, defeating Alejandro Falla and Eduardo Struvay in the final.

== Seeds ==
1. (Colombia) Juan Sebastián Cabal / (Colombia) Robert Farah (semifinals)
2. (Argentina) Pablo Galdón / (Argentina) Eduardo Schwank (quarterfinals)
3. (Italy) Flavio Cipolla / (Italy) Paolo Lorenzi (champions)
4. (Argentina) Brian Dabul / (Russia) Teymuraz Gabashvili (first round)

== Draw ==
Key

- Q = Qualifier
- WC = Wild card
- LL = Lucky loser
- Alt = Alternate
- ITF = ITF entry
- PR = Protected ranking
- SR = Special ranking
- SE = Special exempt
- JE = Junior exempt
- JR = Junior Accelerator Programme entrant
- CO = College Accelerator Programme entrant
- NG = Next Gen Accelerator Program entrant
- w/o = Walkover
- r = Retired
- d = Defaulted

=== Draw ===
First round
1	(Colombia) JS Cabal (Colombia) R Farah	6	7
(Argentina) F Bagnis (Argentina) A Molteni	2	6^{4}
(Argentina) JP Brzezicki (Argentina) L Mayer	6	4	[10]
(Uruguay) M Felder (Colombia) C Salamanca	4	6	[8]
4	(Argentina) B Dabul (Russia) T Gabashvili	4	6	[6]
WC	(Colombia) A Falla (Colombia) E Struvay	6	4	[10]
(Brazil) R Dutra da Silva (Brazil) D Dutra da Silva	6	6
(Mexico) L Díaz-Barriga (Dominican Republic) V Estrella	2	1
(Chile) J Aguilar (Mexico) D Garza	7	6
WC	(Ecuador) JC Campozano (Ecuador) G Lapentti	6^{4}	3
WC	(Colombia) N Barrientos (Colombia) Sebastián Serrano	5	3
3	(Italy) F Cipolla (Italy) P Lorenzi	7	6
(Argentina) D Junqueira (Argentina) M Vassallo Argüello	7	3	[10]
(Canada) P-L Duclos (United Kingdom) J Ward	6^{2}	6	[2]
(Argentina) S Decoud (Italy) R Ghedin	6	6^{5}	[6]
2	(Argentina) P Galdón (Argentina) E Schwank	2	7	[10]

Quarterfinals
1	(Colombia) JS Cabal (Colombia) R Farah	w/o
(Argentina) JP Brzezicki (Argentina) L Mayer
WC	(Colombia) A Falla (Colombia) E Struvay	6	3	[10]
(Brazil) R Dutra da Silva (Brazil) D Dutra da Silva	2	6	[7]
(Chile) J Aguilar (Mexico) D Garza	4	2
3	(Italy) F Cipolla (Italy) P Lorenzi	6	6
(Argentina) D Junqueira (Argentina) M Vassallo Argüello	2	7	[10]
2	(Argentina) P Galdón (Argentina) E Schwank	6	6^{2}	[7]

Semifinals
1	(Colombia) JS Cabal (Colombia) R Farah	6^{3}	1
WC	(Colombia) A Falla (Colombia) E Struvay	7	6
3	(Italy) F Cipolla (Italy) P Lorenzi	4	7	[10]
(Argentina) D Junqueira (Argentina) M Vassallo Argüello	6	6^{2}	[8]

Final
WC	(Colombia) A Falla (Colombia) E Struvay	3	4
3	(Italy) F Cipolla (Italy) P Lorenzi	6	6
