= 2011 Seguros Bolívar Open Barranquilla – Singles =

Singles
- 2011 Seguros Bolívar Open Barranquilla

Final
- Champion: (Argentina) Facundo Bagnis
- Runner-up: (Argentina) Diego Junqueira
- Score: 1–6, 7–6(4), 6–0

Events
Singles	Doubles
- Seguros Bolívar Open Barranquilla

This was the first edition of the event.

Facundo Bagnis won this tournament, defeating Diego Junqueira 1–6, 7–6(4), 6–0 in the final.

== Seeds ==
1. (Russia) Teymuraz Gabashvili (second round)
2. (Argentina) Horacio Zeballos (semifinals)
3. (Argentina) Brian Dabul (second round, retired)
4. (Colombia) Alejandro Falla (second round)
5. (Argentina) Eduardo Schwank (quarterfinals)
6. (France) Éric Prodon (first round)
7. (Italy) Paolo Lorenzi (quarterfinals)
8. (Argentina) Diego Junqueira (final)

== Draw ==
Key

- Q = Qualifier
- WC = Wild card
- LL = Lucky loser
- Alt = Alternate
- ITF = ITF entry
- PR = Protected ranking
- SR = Special ranking
- SE = Special exempt
- JE = Junior exempt
- JR = Junior Accelerator Programme entrant
- CO = College Accelerator Programme entrant
- NG = Next Gen Accelerator Program entrant
- w/o = Walkover
- r = Retired
- d = Defaulted

=== Finals ===
Semifinals
(Italy) Flavio Cipolla	1	6^{2}
(Argentina) Facundo Bagnis	6	7
8	(Argentina) Diego Junqueira	7	6^{5}	6
2	(Argentina) Horacio Zeballos	6^{5}	7	1

Final
(Argentina) Facundo Bagnis	1	7	6
8	(Argentina) Diego Junqueira	6	6^{4}	0

=== Top half ===
First round
1	(Russia) T Gabashvili	6	6
(Brazil) F Romboli	1	1
Q	(Argentina) M Vassallo Argüello	6	6
WC	(Norway) Sander Brendmoe	0	0
(Colombia) R Farah	6	6
WC	(Argentina) Manuel Barros	1	0
(Italy) F Cipolla	6	6
6	(France) É Prodon	3	4
4	(Colombia) A Falla	6	3	7
(Dominican Republic) V Estrella	3	6	5
WC	(Spain) J Martí	1	5
(Argentina) F Bagnis	6	7
(Chile) N Massú	2	5
(Ecuador) G Lapentti	6	7
(United Kingdom) J Ward	2	5
7	(Italy) P Lorenzi	6	7

Second round
1	(Russia) T Gabashvili	1	6^{3}
Q	(Argentina) M Vassallo Argüello	6	7
(Colombia) R Farah	7	5	6^{5}
(Italy) F Cipolla	6^{5}	7	7
4	(Colombia) A Falla	6	2	2
(Argentina) F Bagnis	4	6	6
(Ecuador) G Lapentti	7	3	0^{r}
7	(Italy) P Lorenzi	6^{6}	6	2

Quarterfinals
Q	(Argentina) M Vassallo Argüello	7	4	3
(Italy) F Cipolla	6^{3}	6	6
(Argentina) F Bagnis	6	2	6
7	(Italy) P Lorenzi	1	6	2

Semifinals
(Italy) F Cipolla	1	6^{2}
(Argentina) F Bagnis	6	7

=== Bottom half ===
First round
8	(Argentina) D Junqueira	6	6
Q	(Argentina) Marco Trungelliti	4	3
(Colombia) JS Cabal	6^{5}	6	4
(Argentina) L Mayer	7	0	6
WC	(Brazil) R Dutra da Silva	7	6
Alt	(Italy) R Ghedin	6^{9}	3
(Argentina) A Molteni	6^{5}	0
3	(Argentina) B Dabul	7	6
5	(Argentina) E Schwank	6	6
Q	(United States) Dennis Zivkovic	0	2
Q	(United States) W Odesnik	6	2	1
(Argentina) JP Brzezicki	4	6	6
(Argentina) S Decoud	6	3	4
(Colombia) C Salamanca	2	6	6
(Chile) J Aguilar	3	2
2	(Argentina) H Zeballos	6	6

Second round
8	(Argentina) D Junqueira	7	3
(Argentina) L Mayer	5	2^{r}
WC	(Brazil) R Dutra da Silva	6
3	(Argentina) B Dabul	6^{r}
5	(Argentina) E Schwank	6	6^{5}	6
(Argentina) JP Brzezicki	2	7	3
(Colombia) C Salamanca	3	6	6^{1}
2	(Argentina) H Zeballos	6	4	7

Quarterfinals
8	(Argentina) D Junqueira	6	6
WC	(Brazil) R Dutra da Silva	3	4
5	(Argentina) E Schwank	6	3	4
2	(Argentina) H Zeballos	3	6	6

Semifinals
8	(Argentina) D Junqueira	7	6^{5}	6
2	(Argentina) H Zeballos	6^{5}	7	1
