= 2012 Seguros Bolívar Open Barranquilla =

- Date: 26 March – 1 April
- Edition: 2nd
- Surface: Clay
- Location: Barranquilla, Colombia

Champions

Singles
- (Colombia) Alejandro Falla

Doubles
- (United States) Nicholas Monroe / (United States) Maciek Sykut
← 2011 ·	Seguros Bolívar Open Barranquilla	· 2013 →

The 2012 Seguros Bolívar Open Barranquilla was a professional tennis tournament played on clay courts. It was the second edition of the tournament which was part of the 2012 ATP Challenger Tour. It took place in Barranquilla, Colombia between 26 March – 1 April 2012.

== Singles main draw entrants ==
=== Seeds ===
Country	Player	Rank^{1}	Seed
COL	Alejandro Falla	71	1
BRA	João Souza	104	2
ARG	Diego Junqueira	112	3
FRA	Éric Prodon	114	4
CHI	Paul Capdeville	119	5
ESP	Rubén Ramírez Hidalgo	121	5
ARG	Horacio Zeballos	127	7
ITA	Matteo Viola	154	8

- ^{1} Rankings are as of March 19, 2012.

=== Other entrants ===
The following players received wildcards into the singles main draw:

- (Colombia) Alejandro Falla
- (Colombia) Robert Farah
- (Chile) Nicolás Massú
- (Chile) Matías Sborowitz

The following players received entry from the qualifying draw:

- (Argentina) Andrés Molteni
- (United States) Nicholas Monroe
- (Portugal) Pedro Sousa
- (Germany) Simon Stadler

== Champions ==
=== Singles ===
- (Colombia) Alejandro Falla def. (Argentina) Horacio Zeballos, 6–4, 6–1

=== Doubles ===
- (United States) Nicholas Monroe / (United States) Maciek Sykut def. (Uruguay) Marcel Felder / (Germany) Frank Moser, 2–6, 6–3, [10–5]
