= 2013 Seguros Bolívar Open Barranquilla – Singles =

Singles
- 2013 Seguros Bolívar Open Barranquilla

Final
- Champion: (Argentina) Federico Delbonis
- Runner-up: (Argentina) Facundo Bagnis
- Score: 6–3, 6–2

Events
| Singles | Doubles |
- Seguros Bolívar Open Barranquilla

Alejandro Falla was the defending champion but chose not to compete.
Federico Delbonis defeated Facundo Bagnis 6–3, 6–2 in the final to win the title.

== Seeds ==
1. (Colombia) Santiago Giraldo (second round)
2. (Argentina) Federico Delbonis (champion)
3. (United States) Wayne Odesnik (quarterfinals)
4. (France) Jonathan Dasnières de Veigy (first round)
5. (Argentina) Diego Sebastián Schwartzman (second round)
6. (Colombia) Alejandro González (quarterfinals)
7. (Chile) Jorge Aguilar (second round)
8. (Argentina) Marco Trungelliti (quarterfinals)

== Draw ==
Key

- Q = Qualifier
- WC = Wild card
- LL = Lucky loser
- Alt = Alternate
- ITF = ITF entry
- PR = Protected ranking
- SR = Special ranking
- SE = Special exempt
- JE = Junior exempt
- JR = Junior Accelerator Programme entrant
- CO = College Accelerator Programme entrant
- NG = Next Gen Accelerator Program entrant
- w/o = Walkover
- r = Retired
- d = Defaulted

=== Finals ===
Semifinals
(Argentina) Facundo Bagnis | 3 | 6 | 6
(Belgium) Arthur De Greef | 6 | 2 | 4
(Portugal) Pedro Sousa | 2 | 6^{2}
2 | (Argentina) Federico Delbonis | 6 | 7^{7}

Final
(Argentina) Facundo Bagnis | 3 | 2
2 | (Argentina) Federico Delbonis | 6 | 6

=== Top half ===
First round
1 | (Colombia) S Giraldo | 6 | 6
(Italy) R Ghedin | 1 | 4
(Argentina) F Bagnis | 6 | 6
(Croatia) T Androić | 4 | 2
(Venezuela) D Souto | 6 | 4 | 0
(Argentina) R Olivo | 1 | 6 | 6
Q | (Italy) C Grassi | 7^{7} | 2 | 2
5 | (Argentina) DS Schwartzman | 6^{3} | 6 | 6
4 | (France) J Dasnières de Veigy | 6^{1} | 3
(France) Florian Reynet | 7^{7} | 6
(Belgium) A De Greef | 3 | 6 | 6
WC | (Colombia) Felipe Mantilla | 6 | 3 | 3
WC | (Colombia) Felipe Escobar | 4 | 0^{r}
(Colombia) N Barrientos | 6 | 4
(France) M Teixeira | 3 | 5
8 | (Argentina) M Trungelliti | 6 | 7

Second round
1 | (Colombia) S Giraldo | 6^{4} | 5
(Argentina) F Bagnis | 7^{7} | 7
(Argentina) R Olivo | 7 | 6
5 | (Argentina) DS Schwartzman | 5 | 3
(France) F Reynet | 6^{1} | 6^{5}
(Belgium) A De Greef | 7^{7} | 7^{7}
(Colombia) N Barrientos | 6 | 2 | 1
8 | (Argentina) M Trungelliti | 2 | 6 | 6

Quarterfinals
(Argentina) F Bagnis | 6 | 6
(Argentina) R Olivo | 3 | 1
(Belgium) A De Greef | 6 | 3 | 6
8 | (Argentina) M Trungelliti | 3 | 6 | 3

Semifinals
(Argentina) F Bagnis | 3 | 6 | 6
(Belgium) A De Greef | 6 | 2 | 4

=== Bottom half ===
First round
7 | (Chile) J Aguilar | 7^{7} | 6
(Ecuador) JC Campozano | 6^{5} | 2
(Colombia) C Salamanca | 6^{4} | 6 | 4
(Portugal) P Sousa | 7^{7} | 1 | 6
WC | (Uruguay) M Felder | 5 | 6 | 6
(Georgia (country)) N Basilashvili | 7 | 3 | 1
(Brazil) F de Paula | 4 | 3
3 | (United States) W Odesnik | 6 | 6
6 | (Colombia) A González | 3 | 6 | 6
Q | (Chile) C Saavedra-Corvalán | 6 | 3 | 2
(France) Laurent Rochette | 6 | 3 | 6
Q | (Ecuador) I Endara | 4 | 6 | 1
WC | (Colombia) E Struvay | 2 | 6^{2}
Q | (Chile) JC Sáez | 6 | 7^{7}
PR | (Dominican Republic) V Estrella | 3 | 1
2 | (Argentina) F Delbonis | 6 | 6

Second round
7 | (Chile) J Aguilar | 1 | 4
(Portugal) P Sousa | 6 | 6
WC | (Uruguay) M Felder | 6^{6} | 6^{6}
3 | (United States) W Odesnik | 7^{8} | 7^{8}
6 | (Colombia) A González | 7 | 6
(France) L Rochette | 5 | 1
Q | (Chile) JC Sáez | 1 | 6 | 3
2 | (Argentina) F Delbonis | 6 | 3 | 6

Quarterfinals
(Portugal) P Sousa | 0 | 6 | 6
3 | (United States) W Odesnik | 6 | 4 | 1
6 | (Colombia) A González | 3 | 3
2 | (Argentina) F Delbonis | 6 | 6

Semifinals
(Portugal) P Sousa | 2 | 6^{2}
2 | (Argentina) F Delbonis | 6 | 7^{7}
