= 2015 Seguros Bolívar Open Barranquilla – Singles =

Singles
- 2015 Seguros Bolívar Open Barranquilla

Final
- Champion: (Croatia) Borna Ćorić
- Runner-up: (Brazil) Rogério Dutra Silva
- Score: 6–4, 6–1

Events
Singles	Doubles
- Seguros Bolívar Open Barranquilla

Pablo Cuevas was the defending champion, but chose not to participate. Borna Ćorić won the title over Rogério Dutra Silva.

== Seeds ==
1. (Croatia) Borna Ćorić (champion)
2. (Spain) Marcel Granollers (quarterfinals)
3. (Brazil) João Souza (first round)
4. (Japan) Taro Daniel (quarterfinals)
5. (Colombia) Alejandro González (second round)
6. (Brazil) André Ghem (second round)
7. (Argentina) Máximo González (quarterfinals, retired)
8. (Argentina) Nicolás Kicker (first round)

== Draw ==
Key

- Q = Qualifier
- WC = Wild card
- LL = Lucky loser
- Alt = Alternate
- ITF = ITF entry
- PR = Protected ranking
- SR = Special ranking
- SE = Special exempt
- JE = Junior exempt
- JR = Junior Accelerator Programme entrant
- CO = College Accelerator Programme entrant
- NG = Next Gen Accelerator Program entrant
- w/o = Walkover
- r = Retired
- d = Defaulted

=== Finals ===
Semifinals
1/WC	(Croatia) Borna Ćorić	6	6
(Argentina) Juan Ignacio Londero	3	2
(Brazil) Rogério Dutra Silva	6^{3}	6	6
(Ecuador) Giovanni Lapentti	7^{7}	1	2

Final
1/WC	(Croatia) Borna Ćorić	6	6
(Brazil) Rogério Dutra Silva	4	1

=== Top half ===
First round
1/WC	(Croatia) B Ćorić	6	6
(Brazil) Wilson Leite	1	1
(Ecuador) E Gómez	6	0	2
(Colombia) JS Gómez	2	6	6
(Argentina) Patricio Heras	6^{6}	0
(Argentina) F Mena	7^{8}	6
(Colombia) E Struvay	2	2
7	(Argentina) M González	6	6
4/WC	(Japan) T Daniel	6	4
Q	(Peru) M Echazú	1	1^{r}
Q	(Colombia) DE Galán	6	6
(Ecuador) I Endara	1	2
WC	(Colombia) Jose Daniel Bendeck	1	2
(Argentina) JI Londero	6	6
(Argentina) G Andreozzi	7	4	0^{r}
6	(Brazil) A Ghem	5	6	0

Second round
1/WC	(Croatia) B Ćorić	7^{8}	7
(Colombia) JS Gómez	6^{6}	5
(Argentina) F Mena	4	2
7	(Argentina) M González	6	6
4/WC	(Japan) T Daniel	6	6
Q	(Colombia) DE Galán	1	3
(Argentina) JI Londero	6	6
6	(Brazil) A Ghem	3	2

Quarterfinals
1/WC	(Croatia) B Ćorić	0	6	3
7	(Argentina) M González	6	4	3^{r}
4/WC	(Japan) T Daniel	6^{2}	6	6^{5}
(Argentina) JI Londero	7^{7}	3	7^{7}

Semifinals
1/WC	(Croatia) B Ćorić	6	6
(Argentina) JI Londero	3	2

=== Bottom half ===
First round
5	(Colombia) A González	6	6
Q	(Colombia) Felipe Mantilla	1	4
(Peru) D Beretta	0	1
(Brazil) R Dutra Silva	6	6
Q	(South Africa) R Roelofse	1	6^{3}
(Sweden) C Lindell	6	7^{7}
(Ecuador) G Escobar	6	6
3	(Brazil) J Souza	3	4
8	(Argentina) N Kicker	6	2	5
(Ecuador) G Lapentti	2	6	7
(El Salvador) M Arévalo	3
(United States) A El Mihdawy	0^{r}
(Portugal) J Domingues	6	3	1
(Dominican Republic) J Hernández	4	6	6
(Colombia) A Gómez	4	0
2/WC	(Spain) M Granollers	6	6

Second round
5	(Colombia) A González	4	4
(Brazil) R Dutra Silva	6	6
(Sweden) C Lindell	6	2	7^{7}
(Ecuador) G Escobar	4	6	6^{5}
(Ecuador) G Lapentti	6	7
(El Salvador) M Arévalo	4	5
(Dominican Republic) J Hernández	1	3
2/WC	(Spain) M Granollers	6	6

Quarterfinals
(Brazil) R Dutra Silva	6	7
(Sweden) C Lindell	3	5
(Ecuador) G Lapentti	7^{9}	0	6
2/WC	(Spain) M Granollers	6^{7}	6	3

Semifinals
(Brazil) R Dutra Silva	6^{3}	6	6
(Ecuador) G Lapentti	7^{7}	1	2
