= Challenger Seguros del Estado =

- 2025 Challenger Seguros del Estado

ATP Challenger Tour
- Location: Bogotá, Colombia
- Venue: Club Los Lagartos
- Category: ATP Challenger Tour
- Surface: Clay
- Prize money: $100,000

The Challenger Seguros del Estado is a professional tennis tournament played on clay courts. It is currently part of the ATP Challenger Tour. It was first held in Bogotá, Colombia in 2025.

== Past finals ==
=== Singles ===
Year	Champion	Runner-up	Score
2025	(Colombia) Nicolás Mejía	(Colombia) Juan Sebastián Gómez	6–4, 6–4

=== Doubles ===
Year	Champions	Runners-up	Score
2025	(Venezuela) Luis David Martínez (Colombia) Cristian Rodríguez	(Colombia) Nicolás Barrientos (United States) Benjamin Kittay	6–1, 6–4
