= 2016 Claro Open Barranquilla =

Tennis tournament

- Date: 6–11 September
- Edition: 6th
- Draw: 32S / 16D
- Prize money: $50,000+H
- Surface: Clay
- Location: Barranquilla, Colombia

Champions

Singles
- (Argentina) Diego Schwartzman

Doubles
- (Colombia) Alejandro Falla / (Colombia) Eduardo Struvay
- Claro Open Barranquilla

The 2016 Claro Open Barranquilla was a professional tennis tournament played on clay courts. It was the sixth edition of the tournament which was part of the 2016 ATP Challenger Tour. It took place in Barranquilla, Colombia between 6 and 11 September 2016.

== Singles main-draw entrants ==
=== Seeds ===
Country	Player	Rank	Seed
ARG	Diego Schwartzman	69	1
DOM	Víctor Estrella Burgos	83	2
BRA	Rogério Dutra Silva	108	3
COL	Santiago Giraldo	132	4
ARG	Máximo González	146	5
COL	Alejandro González	158	6
BAR	Darian King	166	7
ESA	Marcelo Arévalo	176	8

=== Other entrants ===
The following players received wildcards into the singles main draw:

- (Colombia) Santiago Giraldo
- (Argentina) Gregorio Cordonnier
- (Colombia) José Daniel Bendeck
- (Dominican Republic) Víctor Estrella Burgos

The following player received entry into the singles main draw as an alternate:

- (Brazil) João Pedro Sorgi

The following players received entry from the qualifying draw:

- (France) Gianni Mina
- (Brazil) Fernando Romboli
- (Colombia) Juan Sebastián Gómez
- (Brazil) Bruno Sant'Anna

== Champions ==
=== Singles ===
* (Argentina) Diego Schwartzman def. (Brazil) Rogério Dutra Silva 6–4, 6–1.

=== Doubles ===
- (Colombia) Alejandro Falla / (Colombia) Eduardo Struvay def. (Ecuador) Gonzalo Escobar / (Ecuador) Roberto Quiroz 6–4,7–5.
