= Arthur Fery =

British tennis player (born 2002)

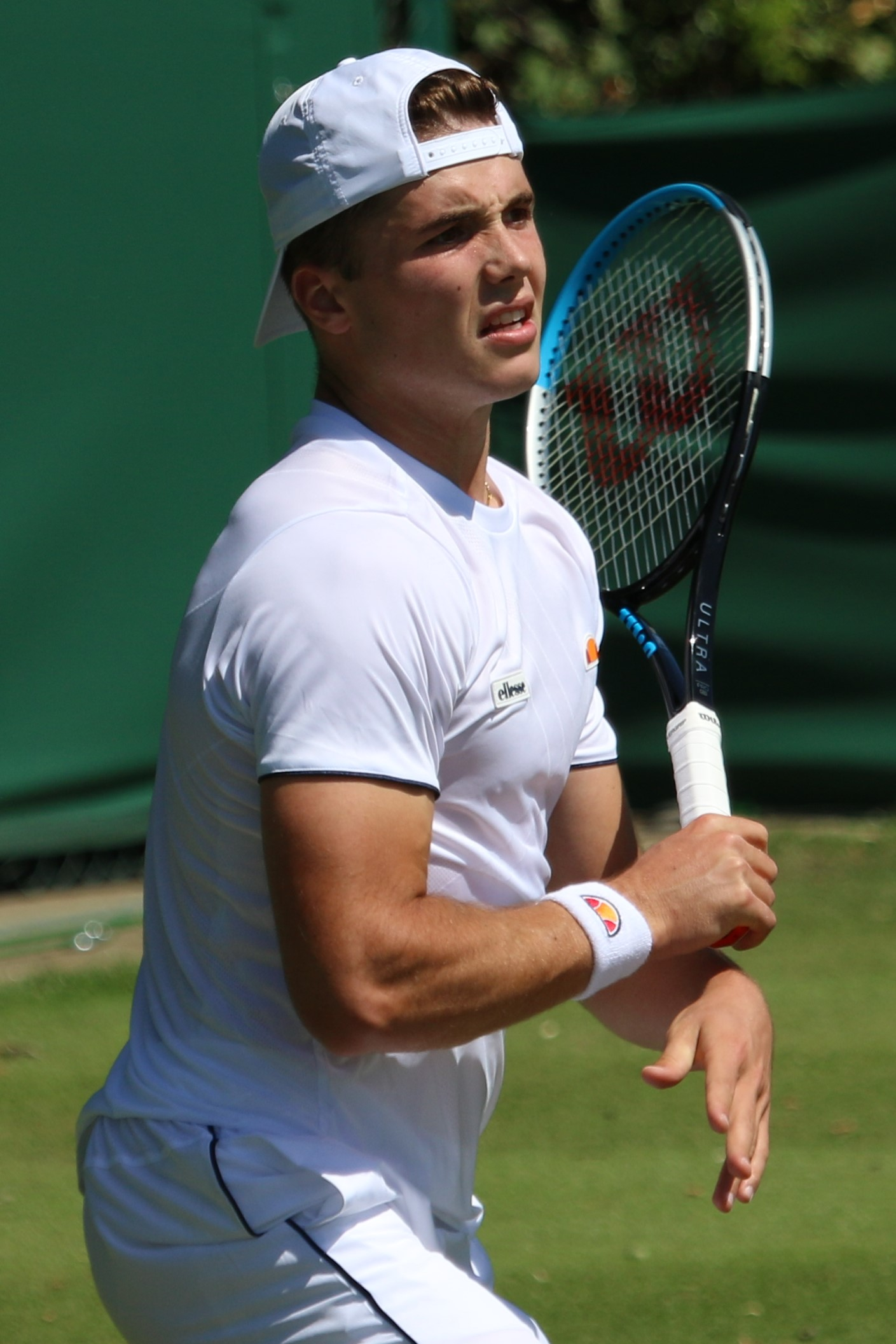
- Fery at the 2022 Wimbledon Championships
- Native name: Arthur Féry
- Country (sports): Great Britain
- Residence: Wimbledon, England, UK
- Born: 12 July 2002 (age 24) Sèvres, Hauts-de-Seine, France
- Height: 1.75 m (5 ft 9 in)
- Turned pro: 2021
- Plays: Right-handed (two-handed backhand)
- College: Stanford
- Coach: Jeroen Benard; Benoît Foucher
- Prize money: US $2,516,081

Singles
- Career record: 20–16
- Career titles: 0
- Highest ranking: No. 32 (2 November 2026)
- Current ranking: No. 33 (9 November 2026)

Grand Slam singles results
- Australian Open: 2R (2026)
- French Open: Q2 (2026)
- Wimbledon: SF (2026)
- US Open: 1R (2026)

Doubles
- Career record: 4–3
- Career titles: 0
- Highest ranking: No. 201 (29 July 2024)

Grand Slam doubles results
- Wimbledon: 3R (2024)
- US Open: 2R (2026)

Grand Slam mixed doubles results
- Wimbledon: 3R (2021)
- Last updated on: 2 November 2026.

Arthur Fery (French: Arthur Féry; born 12 July 2002) is a British professional tennis player. He has a career-high ATP singles ranking of world No. 32 achieved on 2 November 2026 and a doubles ranking of No. 201 achieved on 29 July 2024. His breakthrough came at the 2026 Wimbledon Championships, reaching his first tour-level semifinal, on a wildcard entry. He is the current British No. 1 in singles.

== Early and personal life ==
Arthur Féry was born in Sèvres, France, to French parents. His mother, Olivia Féry (née Gravereaux), is a former professional tennis player, featuring in the main draw of the women's doubles at the 1991 French Open and later representing the Hong Kong Fed Cup team when she became a resident of Hong Kong. His father is Loïc Féry, a businessman and the president of French association football club Lorient.

Fery grew up in Wimbledon, London, following his parents' move from France to the UK when he was a month old, and attended local Donhead Preparatory School and the nearby King's College School. In London, his father worked as a hedge fund manager, while his mother was a business development manager at the Lawn Tennis Association (LTA). Fery represented France at the under-12 level before switching his representation to Great Britain; he holds dual citizenship of both countries. He is a fan of Premier League club Chelsea.

== College education ==
For his higher education, Fery attended Stanford University on a tennis scholarship for a science, technology, and society degree programme, playing in the Pac-12 Conference for three years. During his tenure at Stanford, he was the Pac-12 champion in 2021, a two-time ITA All-American, and the Pac-12 Singles Player of the Year in 2023. As a sophomore, he became the first Stanford player to be ranked No. 1 in singles by the NCAA since Bob Bryan. In both 2022 and 2023, he reached the quarterfinals of the NCAA Men's Tennis Championship in singles, as well as the round of 16 in doubles.

== Career ==
=== 2019–20: Juniors ===
Fery competed in ITF junior events, reaching the semifinals of the 2019 Wimbledon Championships – Boys' doubles and the 2020 Australian Open – Boys' doubles. He reached a career high junior world ranking of No. 12 on 2 March 2020.

=== 2021–22: Major doubles debut ===
Fery received a wildcard into Wimbledon qualifying in 2021, where he beat Prajnesh Gunneswaran and Matthew Ebden, before losing in five sets in the final round of qualifying to Tallon Griekspoor, despite winning the first two sets and going a break up in the third. He was entered into the mixed doubles of the 2021 Wimbledon Championships as an alternate, partnering Tara Moore, after the withdrawal of Aslan Karatsev and Elena Vesnina. Fery and Moore were eliminated in the third round. Fery made his major men's doubles debut at the 2022 Wimbledon Championships, where he and his partner Felix Gill received a wildcard into the draw. They won their first round match against Ariel Behar and Gonzalo Escobar before losing to Kevin Krawietz and Andreas Mies in the second round.

=== 2023–24: Major and top 250 debuts ===
In June 2023, Fery secured his first win at the Challenger level when he defeated Steve Johnson at the Nottingham Open. In July, ranked No. 391, Fery received a wildcard for the singles main draw of the Wimbledon Championships, for his Grand Slam singles debut. Fery lost to third seed Daniil Medvedev. Fery made his top 250 debut on 6 May 2024. He received a wildcard for the singles main draw of the 2024 Wimbledon Championships. He also reached the third round of the doubles tournament, partnering with Charles Broom.

=== 2025: Major singles win ===
In July, Fery recorded his first Grand Slam singles win upsetting 20th seed Alexei Popyrin at Wimbledon, but lost in the second round to Luciano Darderi. In August, Fery won his maiden Challenger title in Barranquilla by walkover as Bernard Tomic withdrew before the final to concentrate on attempting to qualify for the 2025 US Open. In September, Fery made his debut for the Great Britain Davis Cup team against Poland in their World Group I tie in Gdynia, defeating Olaf Pieczkowski in the second match. Fery made his ATP Tour singles debut as a qualifier at the Stockholm Open but lost to Lorenzo Sonego in the first round.

=== 2026: Major semifinal and tour-level final, Masters & top 35 debuts, British No. 1 ===
In January, Fery made his Australian Open debut as a qualifier and defeated 20th seed Flavio Cobolli in the first round for his second Grand Slam win. As a result he reached a career-high singles ranking of No. 152 on 2 February 2026.

In March, Fery made his Masters 1000 debut at the Miami Open as a qualifier but lost in the first round to Stefanos Tsitsipas.

In June, ranked at a career-high of No. 140, Fery was granted a wildcard into the main draw of the 2026 Queen's Club Championships where he defeated wildcard Toby Samuel in the first round. Later that day, he was granted a main draw wildcard for the 2026 Wimbledon Championships. The following day, he reached his first ATP Tour quarterfinal defeating Adrian Mannarino in the second round. Later that month, Fery became the last British singles player in the main draw at Wimbledon after reaching the third round, and subsequently the fourth round of a Grand Slam event for the first time in his career. Next, he reached the quarterfinals with a win over another wildcard entry Grigor Dimitrov. He was only the fifth wildcard player to reach that stage at Wimbledon in the Open Era. He then defeated top-10 player and Roland Garros finalist Flavio Cobolli in straight sets. He was the first British male wildcard player to reach a Grand Slam singles semifinal, and the first unseeded British player, man or woman, to do so at Wimbledon in the Open Era, and only the second wildcard player to have reached that stage at the event, after Goran Ivanišević in 2001. Ranked No. 114, he was the third player outside the ATP top 100 to make it into the last four in the last 40 years. He lost to second seed Alexander Zverev in the semifinals. As a result, he reached the top 50 in the singles rankings on 13 July 2026, one day after his 24th birthday, becoming the British No. 1, ahead of Cameron Norrie.

After his Wimbledon run, Fery went to the Cincinnati Open where he won his first match against James Duckworth, before losing in the second round to fifth seed Alex de Minaur. The following week, in Winston-Salem, seeded 4th, Fery reached his first ATP tour final after defeating Cruz Hewitt, Mees Röttgering, and Aleksandar Kovacevic. He reached the final after opponent James Duckworth retired during the second set of their semifinal. He lost to Ignacio Buse in the final and broke into the top 35 ranking.

== Performance timeline ==
Key
W	F	SF	QF	#R	RR	Q#	DNQ	A	NH

(W) winner; (F) finalist; (SF) semifinalist; (QF) quarterfinalist; (#R) rounds 4, 3, 2, 1; (RR) round-robin stage; (Q#) qualification round; (DNQ) did not qualify; (A) absent; (NH) not held; (SR) strike rate (events won / competed); (W–L) win–loss record.
To avoid confusion and double counting, these charts are updated at the conclusion of a tournament or when the player's participation has ended.

=== Singles ===
Current through the 2026 Rolex Paris Masters.

Tournament	2021	2022	2023	2024	2025	2026	SR	W–L	Win%
Grand Slam tournaments
Australian Open	A	A	A	A	A	2R	0 / 1	1–1	50%
French Open	A	A	A	A	A	Q2	0 / 0	0–0	–
Wimbledon	Q3	Q2	1R	1R	2R	SF	0 / 4	6–4	60%
US Open	A	A	A	A	A	1R	0 / 1	0–1	0%
Win–loss	0–0	0–0	0–1	0–1	1–1	6–3	0 / 6	7–6	54%
ATP 1000 tournaments
Indian Wells Open	A	A	A	A	A	A	0 / 0	0–0	–
Miami Open	A	A	A	A	A	1R	0 / 1	0–1	0%
Monte-Carlo Masters	A	A	A	A	A	A	0 / 0	0–0	–
Madrid Open	A	A	A	A	A	A	0 / 0	0–0	–
Italian Open	A	A	A	A	A	A	0 / 0	0–0	–
Canadian Open	A	A	A	A	A	A	0 / 0	0–0	–
Cincinnati Open	A	A	A	A	Q2	3R	0 / 1	1–1	50%
Shanghai Masters	A	A	A	A	A	2R	0 / 1	1–1	50%
Paris Masters	A	A	A	A	A	1R	0 / 1	0–1	50%
Win–loss	0–0	0–0	0–0	0–0	0–0	2–4	0 / 4	2–4	33%
Career statistics
	2021	2022	2023	2024	2025	2026	Career		
Tournaments	0	0	1	1	2	13	Career total: 17		
Overall win–loss	0–0	0–0	0–1	0–1	2–2	18–13	0 / 17	20–17	54%
Year-end ranking	738	473	271	483	189				

== ATP Tour finals ==
=== Singles: 1 (runner-up) ===
Legend Grand Slam (–) ATP 1000 (–) ATP 500 (–) ATP 250 (0–1)	Finals by surface Hard (0–1) Clay (–) Grass (–)	Finals by setting Outdoor (0–1) Indoor (–)

Result	W–L	Date	Tournament	Tier	Surface	Opponent	Score
Loss	0–1	Aug 2026	Winston-Salem Open, US	ATP 250	Hard	(Peru) Ignacio Buse	3–6, 2–6

== ATP Challenger and ITF Tour finals ==
=== Singles: 10 (6 titles, 4 runner-ups) ===
Legend ATP Challenger (1–2) ITF World Tennis (WTT) (5–2)	Finals by surface Hard (6–4) Clay (–)

Result	W–L	Date	Tournament	Tier	Surface	Opponent	Score
Loss	0–1	Oct 2023	Vendée International, France	Challenger	Hard (i)	(Czech Republic) Tomáš Macháč	3–6, 4–6
Win	1–1	Aug 2025	Barranquilla Open, Colombia	Challenger	Hard	(Australia) Bernard Tomic	walkover
Loss	1–2	Nov 2025	Athens Challenger, Greece	Challenger	Hard	(Belgium) Michael Geerts	5–7, 6–4, 2–6
Win	1–0	Jul 2022	M25 Nottingham, UK	WTT	Hard	(United Kingdom) Daniel Cox	7–5, 2–6, 7–5
Win	2–0	Oct 2022	M25 Sheffield, UK	WTT	Hard	(United Kingdom) Giles Hussey	6–3, 6–2
Loss	2–1	Oct 2022	M25 Sunderland, UK	WTT	Hard	(United Kingdom) Harry Wendelken	4–6, 4–6
Win	3–1	Jan 2023	M25 Malibu, US	WTT	Hard	(United States) Alex Michelsen	6–4, 2–6, 6–4
Win	4–1	Aug 2023	M25 Aldershot, UK	WTT	Hard	(United Kingdom) Toby Samuel	6–4, 6–4
Loss	4–2	Sep 2023	M25 Pozzuoli, Italy	WTT	Hard	(Italy) Francesco Forti	4–6, 3–6
Win	5–2	Feb 2025	M25 Roehampton, UK	WTT	Hard	(United Kingdom) George Loffhagen	6–4, 6–4

=== Doubles: 8 (5 titles, 3 runner-ups) ===
Legend ATP Challenger (1–1) ITF Futures/WTT (4–2)	Finals by surface Hard (3–3) Clay (2–0)

Result	W–L	Date	Tournament	Tier	Surface	Partner	Opponents	Score
Loss	0–1	Nov 2022	Drummondville Challenger, Canada	Challenger	Hard (i)	(United Kingdom) Giles Hussey	(United Kingdom) Julian Cash (United Kingdom) Henry Patten	3–6, 3–6
Win	1–1	Jan 2024	Nonthaburi Challenger, Thailand	Challenger	Hard	(United Kingdom) Joshua Paris	(Thailand) Pruchya Isaro (Thailand) Maximus Jones	6–2, 7–5
Win	1–0	Nov 2019	M15 Nules, Spain	WTT	Clay	(France) Emilien Voisin	(Switzerland) Mirko Martinez (Switzerland) Damien Wenger	7–6^{(7–2)}, 6–4
Win	2–0	Aug 2021	M15 Gdynia, Poland	WTT	Clay	(United Kingdom) Luke Johnson	(Poland) Michał Mikuła (Poland) Yann Wójcik	6–3, 6–1
Loss	2–1	Aug 2022	M25 Roehampton, UK	WTT	Hard	(United Kingdom) Mark Whitehouse	(United Kingdom) Giles Hussey (United Kingdom) Joe Tyler	5–7, 3–6
Win	3–1	Oct 2022	M25 Sunderland, UK	WTT	Hard	(Croatia) Mili Poljičak	(United Kingdom) Giles Hussey (United Kingdom) Johannus Monday	6–3, 6–4
Win	4–1	Apr 2023	M25 Porto, Portugal	WTT	Hard	(United Kingdom) Stuart Parker	(Chile) Diego Fernandez Flores (Portugal) Duarte Vale	6–1, 6–3
Loss	4–2	Aug 2023	M25 Aldershot, UK	WTT	Hard	(United Kingdom) Anton Matusevich	(United Kingdom) Emile Hudd (United Kingdom) Johannus Monday	3–6, 6–3, [8–10]

== Wins over top-10 players ==
- Fery has a 1–1 (50%) record against players who were ranked in the top 10 at the time the match was played.

Season	2026	Total
Wins	1	1

#	Player	Rk	Event	Surface	Rd	Score	Rk	Ref
2026
1.	(Italy) Flavio Cobolli	10	Wimbledon, United Kingdom	Grass	QF	6–4, 7–6^{(7–4)}, 6–0	114	

- Key: (Rk) first use, opponent rank; (Rd) round; (Rk) 2nd use, player rank; (Ref) reference; (F) final; (SF) semifinal; (QF) quarterfinal; (#R) rounds 4, 3, 2, 1; (RR) round-robin stage; (Q#) qualifying rounds or stages (3), 2, 1.

* As of 8 July 2026.
