= Benjamin Kittay =

American tennis player (born 2003)

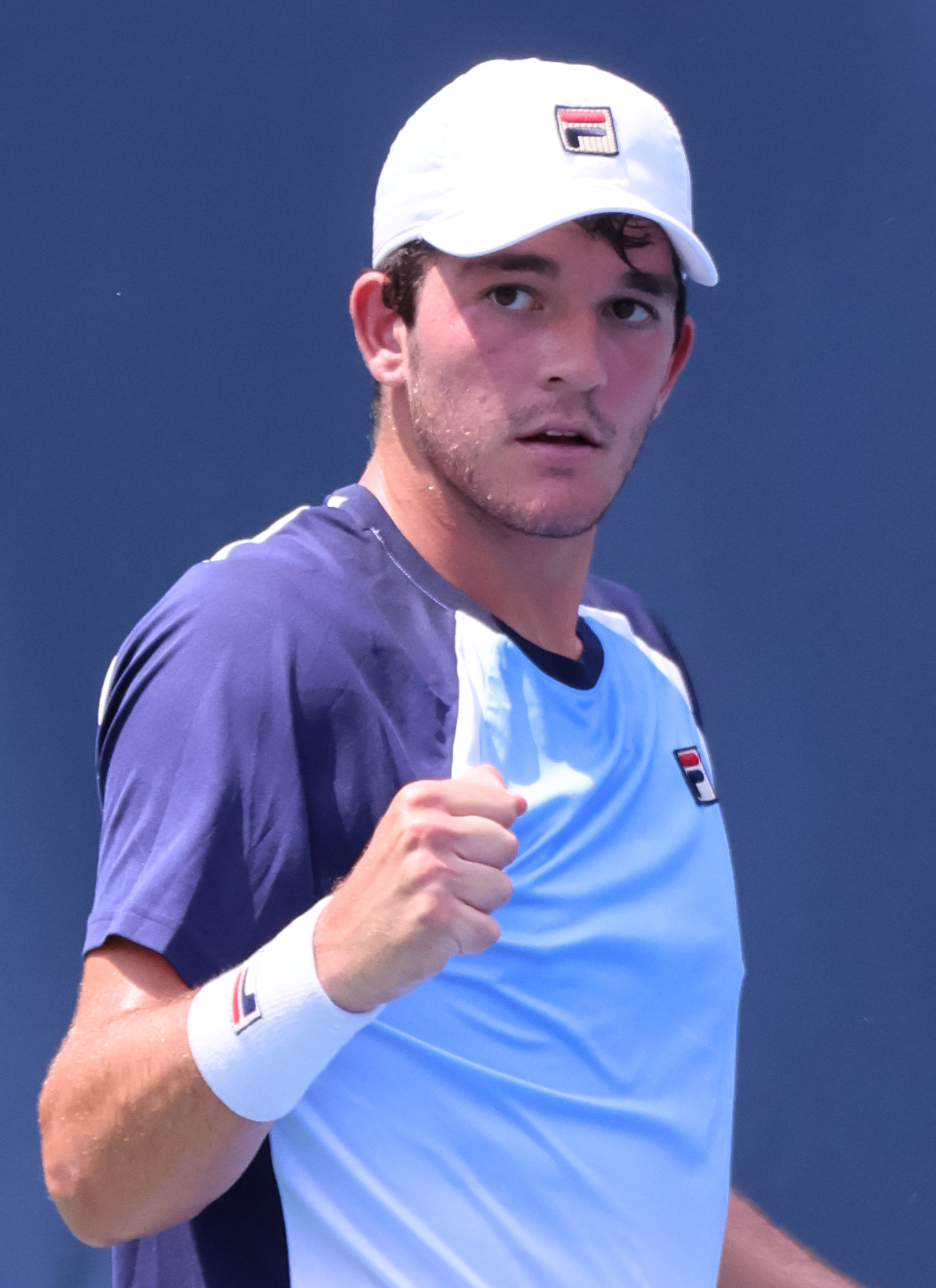
- Kittay at the 2023 Washington Open
- Country (sports): United States
- Born: August 27, 2003 (age 23) Washington, D.C., U.S.
- Height: 1.93 m (6 ft 4 in)
- Plays: Right-handed (two-handed backhand)
- College: North Carolina; Michigan
- Prize money: US $79,274

Singles
- Career record: 0–0 (at ATP Tour level, Grand Slam level, and in Davis Cup)
- Career titles: 0
- Highest ranking: No. 1,634 (August 15, 2022)

Doubles
- Career record: 2–5 (at ATP Tour level, Grand Slam level, and in Davis Cup)
- Career titles: 4 Challenger
- Highest ranking: No. 89 (June 15, 2026)
- Current ranking: No. 89 (June 15, 2026)

Grand Slam doubles results
- French Open: 2R (2026)
- Wimbledon: 1R (2026)
- Last updated on: June 15, 2026.

Benjamin Kittay (born August 27, 2003) is an American tennis player. Kittay has a career high ATP singles ranking of No. 1,634 achieved on August 15, 2022 and a career high ATP doubles ranking of No. 89 achieved on May 18, 2026.

Kittay has won his first ATP Challenger doubles title at the 2025 Kia Open Barranquilla.

Kittay played college tennis at North Carolina before transferring to Michigan.

== ATP Tour finals ==
=== Doubles: 1 (1 runner-up) ===
Result	W–L	Date	Tournament	Tier	Surface	Partner	Opponents	Score
Loss	0–1	Feb 2026	Delray Beach Open, United States	ATP 250	Hard	(United States) Ryan Seggerman	(United States) Austin Krajicek (Croatia) Nikola Mektić	7–6^{(7–3)}, 3–6, [9–11]

== ATP Challenger finals ==
=== Doubles: 7 (5 titles, 2 runner-ups) ===
Legend ATP Challenger Tour (5–2)	Finals by surface Hard (4–1) Clay (1–1)

Result	W–L	Date	Tournament	Tier	Surface	Partner	Opponents	Score
Win	1–0	Aug 2025	Barranquilla, Colombia	Challenger	Hard	(Colombia) Cristian Rodríguez	(Morocco) Taha Baadi (Canada) Dan Martin	6–2, 6–4.
Win	2–0	Sep 2025	Las Vegas, US	Challenger	Hard	(United States) Joshua Sheehy	(New Zealand) Finn Reynolds (New Zealand) James Watt	7–5, 7–6^{(7–2)}
Loss	2–1	Sep 2025	Tiburon, US	Challenger	Hard	(United States) Joshua Sheehy	(New Zealand) Finn Reynolds (New Zealand) James Watt	2–6, 3–6
Loss	2–2	Nov 2025	Bogotá, Colombia	Challenger	Clay	(Colombia) Nicolás Barrientos	(Venezuela) Luis David Martínez (Colombia) Cristian Rodríguez	1–6, 4–6
Win	3–2	Jan 2026	Bangalore, India	Challenger	Hard	(Colombia) Nicolás Barrientos	(France) Arthur Reymond (France) Luca Sanchez	7–6^{(11–9)}, 7–5
Win	4–2	May 2026	Francavilla al Mare, Italy	Challenger	Clay	(United States) Ryan Seggerman	(France) Arthur Reymond (France) Luca Sanchez	6–4, 7–6^{(7–3)}
Win	5–2	Oct 2026	Villena, Spain	Challenger	Hard	(Japan) Takeru Yuzuki	(Israel) Daniel Cukierman (Brazil) Fernando Romboli	6–4, 5–7, [10–7]
