= 2014 Seguros Bolívar Open Barranquilla =

- Date: 24–30 March
- Edition: 4th
- Draw: 32S / 16D
- Prize money: $50,000+H
- Surface: Clay
- Location: Barranquilla, Colombia

Champions

Singles
- (Uruguay) Pablo Cuevas

Doubles
- (Uruguay) Pablo Cuevas / (Spain) Pere Riba
- Seguros Bolívar Open Barranquilla

The 2014 Seguros Bolívar Open Barranquilla was a professional tennis tournament played on clay courts. It was the fourth edition of the tournament which was part of the 2014 ATP Challenger Tour. It took place in Barranquilla, Colombia between 24 and 30 March 2014.

== Singles main-draw entrants ==
=== Seeds ===
| Country | Player | Rank | Seed |
|---|---|---|---|
| COL | Alejandro Falla | 68 | 1 |
| ESP | Albert Ramos | 87 | 2 |
| SVK | Martin Kližan | 88 | 3 |
| AUT | Andreas Haider-Maurer | 109 | 4 |
| ARG | Facundo Argüello | 121 | 5 |
| ROU | Adrian Ungur | 123 | 6 |
| ESP | Pere Riba | 121 | 7 |
| SVN | Blaž Rola | 128 | 8 |

=== Other entrants ===
The following players received wildcards into the singles main draw:

- (Argentina) Eduardo Schwank
- (Colombia) Nicolás Barrientos
- (Colombia) Carlos Salamanca
- (Germany) Alexander Zverev

The following players received entry from the qualifying draw:

- (Australia) Jason Kubler
- (France) Jonathan Eysseric
- (Dominican Republic) José Hernández
- (Croatia) Antonio Veić

== Doubles main-draw entrants ==
=== Seeds ===
| Country | Player | Country | Player | Rank | Seed |
|---|---|---|---|---|---|
| CZE | František Čermák | RUS | Michail Elgin | 127 | 1 |
| ITA | Daniele Bracciali | ITA | Potito Starace | 188 | 2 |
| ARG | Máximo González | ARG | Eduardo Schwank | 278 | 3 |
| USA | Vahid Mirzadeh | NZL | Artem Sitak | 331 | 4 |

=== Other entrants ===
The following pairs received wildcards into the doubles main draw:

- (Germany) Alexander Zverev / (Germany) Mischa Zverev
- (Colombia) Jhan Fontalvo Silva / (Dominican Republic) José Hernández
- (Argentina) Gregorio Cordonnier / (Argentina) Marco Trungelliti

== Champions ==
=== Singles ===
- (Uruguay) Pablo Cuevas def. (Slovakia) Martin Kližan, 6–3, 6–1

=== Doubles ===
- (Uruguay) Pablo Cuevas / (Spain) Pere Riba def. (Czech Republic) František Čermák and (Russia) Michail Elgin, 6–4, 6–3
