= Open Barranquilla =

- 2025 Kia Open Barranquilla

ATP Challenger Tour
- Event name: Kia Open Barranquilla
- Location: Barranquilla, Colombia
- Venue: Parque Distrital de Raquetas de la Puerta de Oro de Colombia
- Category: ATP Challenger Tour
- Surface: Clay
- Draw: 32S/32Q/16D
- Prize money: $100,000 (2025), 50,000+H
- Website: website

The Kia Open Barranquilla (formerly Claro Open Barranquilla and Seguros Bolívar Open) is a tennis tournament held in Barranquilla, Colombia since 2011. The event is part of the ATP Challenger Tour and has been played on clay courts since 2011. In 2025 it came back on the Challenger Tour, branded as the Kia Open Barranquilla.

== Past finals ==
=== Singles ===
Year	Champion	Runner-up	Score
2025	(United Kingdom) Arthur Fery	(Australia) Bernard Tomic	Walkover
2017–2024	Not held		
2016	(Argentina) Diego Schwartzman	(Brazil) Rogério Dutra Silva	6–4, 6–1
2015	(Croatia) Borna Ćorić	(Brazil) Rogério Dutra Silva	6–4, 6–1
2014	(Uruguay) Pablo Cuevas	(Slovakia) Martin Kližan	6–3, 6–1
2013	(Argentina) Federico Delbonis	(Argentina) Facundo Bagnis	6–3, 6–2
2012	(Colombia) Alejandro Falla	(Argentina) Horacio Zeballos	6–4, 6–1
2011	(Argentina) Facundo Bagnis	(Argentina) Diego Junqueira	1–6, 7–6(4), 6–0

=== Doubles ===
Year	Champions	Runners-up	Score
2025	(United States) Benjamin Kittay (Colombia) Cristian Rodríguez	(Morocco) Taha Baadi (Canada) Dan Martin	6–2, 6–4
2017–2024	Not held		
2016	(Colombia) Alejandro Falla (Colombia) Eduardo Struvay	(Ecuador) Gonzalo Escobar (Ecuador) Roberto Quiroz	6–4, 7–5
2015	(El Salvador) Marcelo Arévalo (Peru) Sergio Galdós	(Peru) Duilio Beretta (Peru) Mauricio Echazú	6–1, 6–4
2014	(Uruguay) Pablo Cuevas (Spain) Pere Riba	(Czech Republic) František Čermák (Russia) Michail Elgin	6–4, 6–3
2013	(Argentina) Facundo Bagnis (Argentina) Federico Delbonis	(Brazil) Fabiano de Paula (Italy) Stefano Ianni	6–3, 7–5
2012	(United States) Nicholas Monroe (United States) Maciek Sykut	(Uruguay) Marcel Felder (Germany) Frank Moser	2–6, 6–3, [10–5]
2011	(Italy) Flavio Cipolla (Italy) Paolo Lorenzi	(Colombia) Alejandro Falla (Colombia) Eduardo Struvay	6–3, 6–4
