= 2011 Cerveza Club Premium Open – Singles =

Singles
- 2011 Cerveza Club Premium Open

Final
- Champion: (Argentina) Sebastián Decoud
- Runner-up: (Spain) Daniel Muñoz-de la Nava
- Score: 6–3, 7–6^{(7–3)}

Events
Singles	Doubles
← 2010 ·	Cerveza Club Premium Open	· 2012 →

Giovanni Lapentti was the defending champion but chose not to participate.
Sebastián Decoud won the final against Daniel Muñoz-de la Nava 6–3, 7–6^{(7–3)}:

== Seeds ==
1. (France) Éric Prodon (second round)
2. (Italy) Paolo Lorenzi (first round)
3. (South Africa) Izak van der Merwe (first round)
4. (Spain) Rubén Ramírez Hidalgo (semifinals)
5. (Spain) Daniel Muñoz-de la Nava (final)
6. (Argentina) Facundo Bagnis (quarterfinals)
7. (Colombia) Carlos Salamanca (quarterfinals, retired)
8. (France) Guillaume Rufin (quarterfinals)

== Draw ==
=== Key ===
- Q = Qualifier
- WC = Wild card
- LL = Lucky loser
- Alt = Alternate
- SE = Special exempt
- PR = Protected ranking
- ITF = ITF entry
- JE = Junior exempt
- w/o = Walkover
- r = Retired
- d = Defaulted
- SR = Special ranking

=== Finals ===
Semifinals
(Germany) Andre Begemann	6^{2}	6^{2}
(Argentina) Sebastián Decoud	7^{7}	7^{7}
4	(Spain) Rubén Ramírez Hidalgo	4	6	6^{7}
5	(Spain) Daniel Muñoz-de la Nava	6	2	7^{9}

Final
(Argentina) Sebastián Decoud	6	7^{7}
5	(Spain) Daniel Muñoz-de la Nava	3	6^{3}

=== Top half ===
First round
1	(France) É Prodon	6	6
(France) N Devilder	2	2
(Germany) A Begemann	7	6
WC	(Ecuador) Walter Valarezo	5	1
(Argentina) D Schwartzman	6	6
(Mexico) M Sánchez	1	0
Q	(Argentina) Juan Pablo Ortiz	3	3
6	(Argentina) F Bagnis	6	6
3	(South Africa) I van der Merwe	2	0
(Argentina) S Decoud	6	6
(Lebanon) B Beidas	4	4
(Argentina) Nicolás Pastor	6	6
(Portugal) P Sousa	3	7	5
(Argentina) Cristián Benedetti	6	5	7
Q	(Colombia) JS Gómez	3	3
7	(Colombia) C Salamanca	6	6

Second round
1	(France) É Prodon	6^{5}	6^{7}
(Germany) A Begemann	7^{7}	7^{9}
(Argentina) D Schwartzman	2	6^{5}
6	(Argentina) F Bagnis	6	7^{7}
(Argentina) S Decoud	6	6
(Argentina) N Pastor	2	2
(Argentina) C Benedetti	7^{7}	3	6^{3}
7	(Colombia) C Salamanca	6^{4}	6	7^{7}

Quarterfinals
(Germany) A Begemann	2	6	6
6	(Argentina) F Bagnis	6	4	4
(Argentina) S Decoud	7^{11}
7	(Colombia) C Salamanca	6^{9}	r

Semifinals
(Germany) A Begemann	6^{2}	6^{2}
(Argentina) S Decoud	7^{7}	7^{7}

=== Bottom half ===
First round
8	(France) G Rufin	7^{7}	7^{7}
(Argentina) M Alund	6^{4}	6^{3}
(Argentina) A Velotti	6	6
WC	(United States) Joseph Correa	1	2
(Mexico) L Díaz-Barriga	6	3	6
(United States) M Sykut	3	6	1
WC	(United States) E Nunez	6^{4}	4
4	(Spain) R Ramírez Hidalgo	7^{7}	6
5	(Spain) D Muñoz-de la Nava	6	6
Q	(Colombia) N Barrientos	4	3
WC	(Ecuador) J-S Vivanco	4	6	4
(Australia) Chris Letcher	6	4	6
(Argentina) Guillermo Durán	6	3	2
(Monaco) B Balleret	4	6	6
Q	(Colombia) E Struvay	7	7^{9}
2	(Italy) P Lorenzi	5	6^{7}

Second round
8	(France) G Rufin	6	6
(Argentina) A Velotti	3	4
(Mexico) L Díaz-Barriga	4	2
4	(Spain) R Ramírez Hidalgo	6	6
5	(Spain) D Muñoz-de la Nava	6	6
(Australia) C Letcher	2	1
(Monaco) B Balleret	7^{7}	7^{7}
Q	(Colombia) E Struvay	6^{1}	6^{4}

Quarterfinals
8	(France) G Rufin	6^{3}	2
4	(Spain) R Ramírez Hidalgo	7^{7}	6
5	(Spain) D Muñoz-de la Nava	6	6
(Monaco) B Balleret	4	4

Semifinals
4	(Spain) R Ramírez Hidalgo	4	6	6^{7}
5	(Spain) D Muñoz-de la Nava	6	2	7^{9}
