= 2011 Cerveza Club Premium Open =

- Date: 17 – 23 October
- Edition: 17th
- Location: Quito, Ecuador

Champions

Singles
- (Argentina) Sebastián Decoud

Doubles
- (Colombia) Juan Sebastián Gómez / (United States) Maciek Sykut
← 2010 ·	Cerveza Club Premium Open	· 2012 →

The 2011 Cerveza Club Premium Open was a professional tennis tournament played on clay courts. It was the 17th edition of the tournament which was part of the 2011 ATP Challenger Tour. It took place in Quito, Ecuador between 17 and 23 October 2011.

== Singles main draw entrants ==
=== Seeds ===
Country	Player	Rank^{1}	Seed
FRA	Éric Prodon	90	1
ITA	Paolo Lorenzi	110	2
RSA	Izak van der Merwe	132	3
ESP	Rubén Ramírez Hidalgo	133	4
ESP	Daniel Muñoz de la Nava	157	5
ARG	Facundo Bagnis	174	6
COL	Carlos Salamanca	241	7
FRA	Guillaume Rufin	243	8

- ^{1} Rankings are as of October 10, 2011.

=== Other entrants ===
The following players received wildcards into the singles main draw:

- (United States) Joseph Correa
- (United States) Eric Nunez
- (Ecuador) Walter Valarezo
- (Ecuador) Juan-Sebastián Vivanco

The following players received entry from the qualifying draw:

- (Colombia) Nicolás Barrientos
- (Colombia) Juan Sebastián Gómez
- (Argentina) Juan Pablo Ortiz
- (Colombia) Eduardo Struvay

== Champions ==
=== Singles ===
(Argentina) Sebastián Decoud def. (Spain) Daniel Muñoz de la Nava, 6–3, 7–6^{(7–3)}

=== Doubles ===
(Colombia) Juan Sebastián Gómez / (United States) Maciek Sykut def. (Germany) Andre Begemann / (South Africa) Izak van der Merwe, 3–6, 7–5, [10–8]
