= 2011 Cerveza Club Premium Open – Doubles =

Doubles
- 2011 Cerveza Club Premium Open

Final
- Champions: (Colombia) Juan Sebastián Gómez (United States) Maciek Sykut
- Runners-up: (Germany) Andre Begemann (South Africa) Izak van der Merwe
- Score: 3–6, 7–5, [10–8]

Events
Singles	Doubles
← 2010 ·	Cerveza Club Premium Open	· 2012 →

The 2011 Cerveza Club Premium Open was a professional tennis tournament played on clay courts. It was the 17th edition of the tournament which was part of the 2011 ATP Challenger Tour. It took place in Quito, Ecuador between 17 and 23 October 2011.

== Doubles ==
Daniel Garza and Eric Nunez were the defending champions but Garza decided not to participate.
Nunez played alongside Benjamin Balleret but lost in the first round.
Juan Sebastián Gómez and Maciek Sykut won the tournament after defeating Andre Begemann and Izak van der Merwe 3–6, 7–5, [10–8] in the final.

== Seeds ==
1. (Spain) Daniel Muñoz de la Nava / (Spain) Rubén Ramírez Hidalgo (semifinals)
2. (Germany) Andre Begemann / (South Africa) Izak van der Merwe (final)
3. (Argentina) Facundo Bagnis / (Argentina) Guillermo Durán (first round)
4. (Mexico) Luis Díaz-Barriga / (United States) Chris Kwon (first round)

== Draw ==
=== Key ===
- Q = Qualifier
- WC = Wild card
- LL = Lucky loser
- Alt = Alternate
- ITF = ITF entry
- PR = Protected ranking
- SR = Special ranking
- SE = Special exempt
- JE = Junior exempt
- JR = Junior Accelerator Programme entrant
- CO = College Accelerator Programme entrant
- NG = Next Gen Accelerator Program entrant
- w/o = Walkover
- r = Retired
- d = Defaulted

=== Draw ===
First round
1	(Spain) D Muñoz de la Nava (Spain) R Ramírez Hidalgo	6	6
(Monaco) B Balleret (United States) E Nunez	3	4
(France) N Devilder (France) É Prodon	5	6	[7]
(United States) Peter Aarts (Australia) Chris Letcher	7	4	[10]
4	(Mexico) L Díaz-Barriga (United States) Chris Kwon	3	5
(Argentina) M Alund (Argentina) Nicolás Pastor	6	7
(Colombia) JS Gómez (United States) M Sykut	6	6
WC	(Italy) Enrico Becuzzi (Italy) P Lorenzi	3	3
(Colombia) N Barrientos (Mexico) M Sánchez	6^{4}	3
(Argentina) Diego Schwartzman (Argentina) A Velotti	7^{7}	6
(Colombia) C Salamanca (Colombia) E Struvay	6^{5}	6	[10]
3	(Argentina) F Bagnis (Argentina) Guillermo Durán	7^{7}	3	[8]
WC	(Ecuador) Walter Valarezo (Ecuador) J-S Vivanco	6	4	[5]
(Spain) Óscar Burrieza (Portugal) P Sousa	2	6	[10]
WC	(Lebanon) B Beidas (United States) Joseph Correa	2	4
2	(Germany) A Begemann (South Africa) I van der Merwe	6	6

Quarterfinals
1	(Spain) D Muñoz de la Nava (Spain) R Ramírez Hidalgo	6	7
(United States) P Aarts (Australia) C Letcher	3	5
(Argentina) M Alund (Argentina) N Pastor	3	4
(Colombia) JS Gómez (United States) M Sykut	6	6
(Argentina) D Schwartzman (Argentina) A Velotti	2	4
(Colombia) C Salamanca (Colombia) E Struvay	6	6
(Spain) Ó Burrieza (Portugal) P Sousa	4	3
2	(Germany) A Begemann (South Africa) I van der Merwe	6	6

Semifinals
1	(Spain) D Muñoz de la Nava (Spain) R Ramírez Hidalgo	7^{7}	3	[3]
(Colombia) JS Gómez (United States) M Sykut	6^{2}	6	[10]
(Colombia) C Salamanca (Colombia) E Struvay
2	(Germany) A Begemann (South Africa) I van der Merwe	w/o

Final
(Colombia) JS Gómez (United States) M Sykut	3	7	[10]
(Germany) A Begemann (South Africa) I van der Merwe	6	5	[8]
