= 2020 Internazionali di Tennis Città di Todi – Doubles =

Doubles
- 2020 Internazionali di Tennis Città di Todi

Final
- Champions: (Uruguay) Ariel Behar (Kazakhstan) Andrey Golubev
- Runners-up: (France) Elliot Benchetrit (France) Hugo Gaston
- Score: 6–4, 6–2

Events
Singles	Doubles
← 2019 ·	Internazionali di Tennis Città di Todi	· 2021 →

Tomislav Brkić and Ante Pavić were the defending champions but only Brkić chose to defend his title, partnering Alessandro Giannessi. Brkić withdrew in the first round for medical reasons.

Ariel Behar and Andrey Golubev won the title after defeating Elliot Benchetrit and Hugo Gaston 6–4, 6–2 in the final.

== Seeds ==
1. (Uruguay) Ariel Behar / (Kazakhstan) Andrey Golubev (champions)
2. (Switzerland) Luca Margaroli / (Italy) Andrea Vavassori (first round)
3. (Poland) Karol Drzewiecki / (Poland) Szymon Walków (semifinals)
4. (Italy) Marco Bortolotti / (Spain) Mario Vilella Martínez (quarterfinals)

== Draw ==
=== Key ===
- Q = Qualifier
- WC = Wild card
- LL = Lucky loser
- Alt = Alternate
- SE = Special exempt
- PR = Protected ranking
- ITF = ITF entry
- JE = Junior exempt
- w/o = Walkover
- r = Retired
- d = Defaulted
- SR = Special ranking

First round
WC	(Italy) L Musetti (Italy) G Zeppieri	6	7
(Argentina) A Collarini (Italy) L Giustino	3	5
3	(Poland) K Drzewiecki (Poland) S Walków	7^{7}	7
(France) M Janvier (Spain) B Zapata Miralles	6^{3}	5
(Spain) R Carballés Baena (Argentina) M Trungelliti	7^{7}	2	[10]
(Italy) F Baldi (France) A Hoang	6^{4}	6	[7]
WC	(Italy) F Cobolli (Italy) M Gigante	w/o
(Bosnia and Herzegovina) T Brkić (Italy) A Giannessi
(Argentina) JP Ficovich (Argentina) F Mena	3	3
4	(Italy) M Bortolotti (Spain) M Vilella Martínez	6	6
(Argentina) F Bagnis (Argentina) R Olivo	6	5	[8]
WC	(Italy) Alessio De Bernardis (Italy) F Forti	2	7	[10]
(France) E Benchetrit (France) H Gaston	6	4	[11]
2	(Switzerland) L Margaroli (Italy) A Vavassori	4	6	[9]

Quarterfinals
1	(Uruguay) A Behar (Kazakhstan) A Golubev	7	7^{7}
WC	(Italy) L Musetti (Italy) G Zeppieri	5	6^{4}
3	(Poland) K Drzewiecki (Poland) S Walków	w/o
(Spain) R Carballés Baena (Argentina) M Trungelliti
WC	(Italy) F Cobolli (Italy) M Gigante	6	6
4	(Italy) M Bortolotti (Spain) M Vilella Martínez	1	3
WC	(Italy) A De Bernardis (Italy) F Forti	2	6	[4]
(France) E Benchetrit (France) H Gaston	6	4	[10]

Semifinals
1	(Uruguay) A Behar (Kazakhstan) A Golubev	6	6
3	(Poland) K Drzewiecki (Poland) S Walków	2	4
WC	(Italy) F Cobolli (Italy) M Gigante	1	4
(France) E Benchetrit (France) H Gaston	6	6

Final
1	(Uruguay) A Behar (Kazakhstan) A Golubev	6	6
(France) E Benchetrit (France) H Gaston	4	2
