= 2009 Club Premium Open – Doubles =

Doubles
- 2009 Club Premium Open

Final
- Champions: (Mexico) Santiago González (United States) Travis Rettenmaier
- Runners-up: (Ecuador) Michael Quintero (Spain) Fernando Vicente
- Score: 1–6, 6–3, [10–3]

Events
Singles	Doubles
← 2008 ·	Club Premium Open	· 2010 →

Hugo Armando and Leonardo Mayer were the defending champions.
Santiago González and Travis Rettenmaier defeated Michael Quintero and Fernando Vicente 1–6, 6–3, [10–3] in the final.

== Seeds ==
1. (Mexico) Santiago González / (United States) Travis Rettenmaier (champions)
2. (United States) Eric Nunez / (Brazil) Márcio Torres (quarterfinals)
3. (Colombia) Santiago Giraldo / (Colombia) Alejandro González (quarterfinals)
4. (Colombia) Michael Quintero / (Spain) Fernando Vicente (final)

== Draw ==
=== Key ===
- Q = Qualifier
- WC = Wild card
- LL = Lucky loser
- Alt = Alternate
- SE = Special exempt
- PR = Protected ranking
- ITF = ITF entry
- JE = Junior exempt
- w/o = Walkover
- r = Retired
- d = Defaulted
- SR = Special ranking

=== Draw ===
First round
1	(Mexico) S González (United States) T Rettenmaier	6	6
(Tunisia) M Jaziri (France) V Millot	3	3
WC	(Chile) Guillermo Rivera-Aranguiz (Colombia) Sebastián Serrano	7	6
(Peru) M Echazú (Spain) C Poch-Gradin	6^{5}	4
3	(Colombia) S Giraldo (Colombia) A González	7	7
(Argentina) D Álvarez (Argentina) F del Bonis	5	6^{3}
WC	(Ecuador) D Acosta (Ecuador) R Quiroz	1	5
(Uruguay) M Felder (Colombia) C Salamanca	6	7
(Ecuador) JC Campozano (Brazil) M Demoliner	6	6
WC	(Ecuador) Carlos Luna Romero (Ecuador) Hugo Minda	4	2
(Argentina) S Decoud (Canada) P Polansky	6	6^{2}	[4]
4	(Colombia) M Quintero (Spain) F Vicente	4	7	[10]
(Germany) A Begemann (Italy) R Ghedin	4	3
(Ecuador) I Endara (Ecuador) Walter Valarezo	6	6
(Ecuador) G Lapentti (Argentina) G Marcaccio	3	6^{5}
2	(United States) E Nunez (Brazil) M Torres	6	7

Quarterfinals
1	(Mexico) S González (United States) T Rettenmaier	6	6
WC	(Chile) G Rivera-Aranguiz (Colombia) S Serrano	1	3
3	(Colombia) S Giraldo (Colombia) A González	6	1	[2]
(Uruguay) M Felder (Colombia) C Salamanca	3	6	[10]
(Ecuador) JC Campozano (Brazil) M Demoliner	3	4
4	(Colombia) M Quintero (Spain) F Vicente	6	6
(Ecuador) I Endara (Ecuador) W Valarezo	4	7	[10]
2	(United States) E Nunez (Brazil) M Torres	6	6^{4}	[4]

Semifinals
1	(Mexico) S González (United States) T Rettenmaier	6	6
(Uruguay) M Felder (Colombia) C Salamanca	1	1
4	(Colombia) M Quintero (Spain) F Vicente	7	6^{7}	[10]
(Ecuador) I Endara (Ecuador) W Valarezo	5	7	[6]

Finals
1	(Mexico) S González (United States) T Rettenmaier	1	6	[10]
4	(Colombia) M Quintero (Spain) F Vicente	6	3	[3]
