= 2012 Quito Challenger – Doubles =

Doubles
- 2012 Quito Challenger

Final
- Champions: (Colombia) Juan Sebastián Cabal (Colombia) Carlos Salamanca
- Runners-up: (Brazil) Marcelo Demoliner (Brazil) João Souza
- Score: 7–6^{(9–7)}, 7–6^{(7–4)}

Events
Singles	Doubles
← 2011 ·	Quito Challenger	· 2013 →

Juan Sebastián Gómez and Maciek Sykut were the defending champions but decided not to participate.
Juan Sebastián Cabal and Carlos Salamanca won the title, defeating Marcelo Demoliner and João Souza 7–6^{(9–7)}, 7–6^{(7–4)} in the final.

== Seeds ==
1. (Brazil) Marcelo Demoliner / (Brazil) João Souza (final)
2. (Colombia) Juan Sebastián Cabal / (Colombia) Carlos Salamanca (champions)
3. (Montenegro) Goran Tošić / (United States) Denis Zivkovic (quarterfinals)
4. (Argentina) Martín Alund / (Peru) Duilio Beretta (semifinals)

== Draw ==
=== Key ===
- Q = Qualifier
- WC = Wild card
- LL = Lucky loser
- Alt = Alternate
- SE = Special exempt
- PR = Protected ranking
- ITF = ITF entry
- JE = Junior exempt
- w/o = Walkover
- r = Retired
- d = Defaulted
- SR = Special ranking

=== Draw ===
First round
1	(Brazil) M Demoliner (Brazil) J Souza	6	7
WC	(United States) Lucas Dages (United States) Ognjen Samardzic	0	5
(Colombia) N Barrientos (Chile) G Rivera-Aránguiz	w/o
(Argentina) Maximiliano Estévez (Sweden) C Lindell
3	(Montenegro) G Tošić (United States) D Zivkovic	6	6
WC	(Ecuador) Juan Sebastian Carvajal (United States) Joseph Correa	1	1
(Philippines) R Gonzales (Australia) Chris Letcher	6^{6}	6^{7}
(Ecuador) JC Campozano (Dominican Republic) V Estrella	7^{8}	7^{9}
(Argentina) S Decoud (Portugal) F Gil	7^{7}	1	[5]
(Argentina) Guillermo Durán (Argentina) A Molteni	6^{5}	6	[10]
(El Salvador) M Arévalo (Mexico) MÁ Reyes-Varela	6	4	[12]
4	(Argentina) M Alund (Peru) D Beretta	4	6	[14]
(United States) Sam Barnett (United States) K Kim	3	2
(Italy) Piercarlo Bianciardi (United States) J Witten	6	6
(Ecuador) I Endara (France) L Recouderc	4	1
2	(Colombia) JS Cabal (Colombia) C Salamanca	6	6

Quarterfinals
1	(Brazil) M Demoliner (Brazil) J Souza	6	6
(Colombia) N Barrientos (Chile) G Rivera-Aránguiz	4	4
3	(Montenegro) G Tošić (United States) D Zivkovic	3	3
(Ecuador) JC Campozano (Dominican Republic) V Estrella	6	6
(Argentina) G Durán (Argentina) A Molteni	5	6	[7]
4	(Argentina) M Alund (Peru) D Beretta	7	1	[10]
(Italy) P Bianciardi (United States) J Witten	3	1
2	(Colombia) JS Cabal (Colombia) C Salamanca	6	6

Semifinals
1	(Brazil) M Demoliner (Brazil) J Souza	w/o
(Ecuador) JC Campozano (Dominican Republic) V Estrella
4	(Argentina) M Alund (Peru) D Beretta	3	1
2	(Colombia) JS Cabal (Colombia) C Salamanca	6	6

Final
1	(Brazil) M Demoliner (Brazil) J Souza	6^{7}	6^{4}
2	(Colombia) JS Cabal (Colombia) C Salamanca	7^{9}	7^{7}
