= 2021 Quito Challenger =

- Date: 13–19 September
- Edition: 22nd
- Surface: Clay
- Location: Quito, Ecuador

Champions

Singles
- (Argentina) Facundo Mena

Doubles
- (Colombia) Alejandro Gómez / (Argentina) Thiago Agustín Tirante
- Quito Challenger

The 2021 Quito Challenger was a professional tennis tournament played on clay courts. It was the 22nd edition of the tournament which was part of the 2021 ATP Challenger Tour. It took place in Quito, Ecuador between 13 and 19 September 2021.

== Singles main-draw entrants ==
=== Seeds ===
Country	Player	Rank^{1}	Seed
SVK	Andrej Martin	122	1
ECU	Emilio Gómez	161	2
ESP	Mario Vilella Martínez	170	3
ARG	Renzo Olivo	215	4
ARG	Juan Pablo Ficovich	254	5
ARG	Facundo Mena	262	6
ARG	Thiago Agustín Tirante	268	7
ECU	Roberto Quiroz	294	8

- ^{1} Rankings are as of 30 August 2021.

=== Other entrants ===
The following players received wildcards into the singles main draw:

- (Ecuador) Álvaro Guillén Meza
- (Ecuador) Antonio Cayetano March
- (Ecuador) Gian Carlos Rodríguez

The following players received entry from the qualifying draw:

- (Switzerland) Luca Castelnuovo
- (France) Alexis Gautier
- (Colombia) Alejandro Gómez
- (United States) Christian Langmo

== Champions ==
=== Singles ===
- (Argentina) Facundo Mena def. (Chile) Gonzalo Lama 6–4, 6–4.

=== Doubles ===
- (Colombia) Alejandro Gómez / (Argentina) Thiago Agustín Tirante def. (Spain) Adrián Menéndez Maceiras / (Spain) Mario Vilella Martínez 7–5, 6–7^{(5–7)}, [10–8].
