= 2009 Club Premium Open – Singles =

Singles
- 2009 Club Premium Open

Final
- Champion: (Colombia) Carlos Salamanca
- Runner-up: (Argentina) Sebastián Decoud
- Score: 7–6(4), 6–7(5), 6–4

Events
Singles	Doubles
← 2008 ·	Club Premium Open	· 2010 →

Giovanni Lapentti tried to defend his 2008 title, but he was eliminated by Santiago Giraldo in the quarterfinals.
Carlos Salamanca became the new champion, after beating Sebastián Decoud 7–6(4), 6–7(5), 6–4 in the final.

== Seeds ==
1. (Colombia) Santiago Giraldo (semifinals)
2. (Argentina) Sebastián Decoud (final)
3. (Canada) Peter Polansky (quarterfinals)
4. (Mexico) Santiago González (quarterfinals)
5. (Spain) Carles Poch-Gradin (second round)
6. (Ecuador) Giovanni Lapentti (quarterfinals)
7. (France) Vincent Millot (second round)
8. (Argentina) Federico del Bonis (first round)

== Draw ==
=== Key ===
- Q = Qualifier
- WC = Wild card
- LL = Lucky loser
- Alt = Alternate
- SE = Special exempt
- PR = Protected ranking
- ITF = ITF entry
- JE = Junior exempt
- w/o = Walkover
- r = Retired
- d = Defaulted
- SR = Special ranking

=== Final eight ===
Semifinals
1	(Colombia) Santiago Giraldo	3	6	6^{2}
(Colombia) Carlos Salamanca	6	1	7
(Germany) Andre Begemann	3	4
2	(Argentina) Sebastián Decoud	6	6

Final
(Colombia) Carlos Salamanca	7	6^{5}	6
2	(Argentina) Sebastián Decoud	6^{4}	7	4

=== Top half ===
First round
1	(Colombia) S Giraldo	6	6
(Brazil) L Kirche	2	2
WC	(Ecuador) Juan-Sebastián Vivanco	7	3	3
(Peru) M Echazú	6^{1}	6	6
(Venezuela) J de Armas	4	3
Q	(Chile) G Rivera Aránguiz	6	6
Q	(Colombia) M Quintero	2	4
6	(Ecuador) G Lapentti	6	6
3	(Canada) P Polansky	6	5	6
(Uruguay) M Felder	1	7	4
WC	(Ecuador) I Endara	6	6
WC	(United States) Carlton Fiorentino	3	3
(Ecuador) C Avellán	3	4
(Colombia) C Salamanca	6	6
(Brazil) M Demoliner	4	4
5	(Spain) C Poch-Gradin	6	6

Second round
1	(Colombia) S Giraldo	6	6
(Peru) M Echazú	4	2
Q	(Chile) G Rivera Aránguiz	6^{2}	2
6	(Ecuador) G Lapentti	7	6
3	(Canada) P Polansky	6	7
WC	(Ecuador) I Endara	2	6^{3}
(Colombia) C Salamanca	6	7
5	(Spain) C Poch-Gradin	1	6^{3}

Quarterfinals
1	(Colombia) S Giraldo	6	2	7
6	(Ecuador) G Lapentti	4	6	6^{2}
3	(Canada) P Polansky	6^{4}	7	6^{3}
(Colombia) C Salamanca	7	6^{1}	7

Semifinals
1	(Colombia) S Giraldo	3	6	6^{2}
(Colombia) C Salamanca	6	1	7

=== Bottom half ===
First round
8	(Argentina) F del Bonis	6^{7}	4
(Germany) A Begemann	7	6
Q	(Argentina) N Todero	7	3	7
(Colombia) A González	5	6	6^{1}
(Argentina) D Álvarez	6	6
(Ecuador) JC Campozano	4	4
(Italy) R Ghedin	4	4
4	(Mexico) S González	6	6
7	(France) V Millot	6	6
(Tunisia) M Jaziri	2	4
(United States) E Nunez	7	6
(Brazil) E Ribeiro Neto	5	4
Q	(Mexico) B Rodríguez	6	6
WC	(Chile) M Sborowitz	2	0
(Spain) F Vicente	3	6	6^{6}
2	(Argentina) S Decoud	6	3	7

Second round
(Germany) A Begemann	6	6
Q	(Argentina) N Todero	2	4
(Argentina) D Álvarez	6^{7}	6	6^{5}
4	(Mexico) S González	7	4	7
7	(France) V Millot	5	6^{5}
(United States) E Nunez	7	7
Q	(Mexico) B Rodríguez	5	3
2	(Argentina) S Decoud	7	6

Quarterfinals
(Germany) A Begemann	6	6
4	(Mexico) S González	4	3
(United States) E Nunez	5	6^{4}
2	(Argentina) S Decoud	7	7

Semifinals
(Germany) A Begemann	3	4
2	(Argentina) S Decoud	6	6
