= 2009 Club Premium Open =

- Date: 28 September–4 October
- Edition: 15th
- Location: Quito, Ecuador

Champions

Singles
- (Colombia) Carlos Salamanca

Doubles
- (Mexico) Santiago González / (United States) Travis Rettenmaier
← 2008 ·	Club Premium Open	· 2010 →

The 2009 Club Premium Open was a professional tennis tournament played on outdoor red clay courts. It was part of the 2009 ATP Challenger Tour. It took place in Quito, Ecuador between 28 September and 4 October 2009.

== Singles main draw entrants ==
=== Seeds ===
Country	Player	Rank^{1}	Seed
COL	Santiago Giraldo	123	1
ARG	Sebastián Decoud	165	2
CAN	Peter Polansky	188	3
MEX	Santiago González	191	4
ESP	Carles Poch-Gradin	215	5
ECU	Giovanni Lapentti	219	6
FRA	Vincent Millot	220	7
ARG	Federico del Bonis	231	8

- Rankings are as of 21 September 2009.

=== Other entrants ===
The following players received wildcards into the singles main draw:

- (Ecuador) Iván Endara
- (United States) Carlton Fiorentino
- (Chile) Matías Sborowitz
- (Ecuador) Juan-Sebastián Vivanco

The following players received entry from the qualifying draw:

- (Chile) Guillermo Rivera Aránguiz
- (Mexico) Bruno Rodríguez
- (Argentina) Nicolás Todero
- (Colombia) Michael Quintero

== Champions ==
=== Singles ===
(Colombia) Carlos Salamanca def. (Argentina) Sebastián Decoud, 7–6(4), 6–7(5), 6–4

=== Doubles ===
(Mexico) Santiago González / (United States) Travis Rettenmaier def. (Spain) Fernando Vicente / (Colombia) Michael Quintero, 1–6, 6–3, [10–3]
