= 2012 Quito Challenger =

- Date: 1–7 October
- Edition: 18th
- Surface: Clay
- Location: Quito, Ecuador

Champions

Singles
- (Brazil) João Souza

Doubles
- (Colombia) Juan Sebastián Cabal / (Colombia) Carlos Salamanca
← 2011 ·	Quito Challenger	· 2013 →

The 2012 Quito Challenger was a professional tennis tournament played on clay courts. It was the 18th edition of the tournament which was part of the 2012 ATP Challenger Tour. It took place in Quito, Ecuador between 1 and 7 October 2012.

== Singles main draw entrants ==
=== Seeds ===
Country	Player	Rank^{1}	Seed
POR	Frederico Gil	131	1
FRA	Guillaume Rufin	132	2
ARG	Martín Alund	134	3
BRA	João Souza	152	4
ARG	Eduardo Schwank	170	5
DOM	Víctor Estrella	186	6
COL	Carlos Salamanca	235	7
ECU	Júlio César Campozano	247	8

- ^{1} Rankings are as of September 24, 2012.

=== Other entrants ===
The following players received wildcards into the singles main draw:

- (United States) Joseph Correa
- (United States) Lucas Dages
- (Ecuador) José Chamba Gómez
- (Chile) Nicolás Massú

The following players received entry from the qualifying draw:

- (Ecuador) Juan Carvajal
- (Portugal) Frederico Gil
- (Mexico) Miguel Ángel Reyes-Varela
- (Montenegro) Goran Tošić

== Champions ==
=== Singles ===
- (Brazil) João Souza def. (France) Guillaume Rufin, 6–2, 7–6^{(7–4)}

=== Doubles ===
- (Colombia) Juan Sebastián Cabal / (Colombia) Carlos Salamanca def. (Brazil) Marcelo Demoliner / (Brazil) João Souza, 7–6^{(9–7)}, 7–6^{(7–4)}
