= 2020 Internazionali di Tennis Città di Todi – Singles =

Singles
- 2020 Internazionali di Tennis Città di Todi

Final
- Champion: (Germany) Yannick Hanfmann
- Runner-up: (Spain) Bernabé Zapata Miralles
- Score: 6–3, 6–3

Events
Singles	Doubles
← 2019 ·	Internazionali di Tennis Città di Todi	· 2021 →

Andrea Collarini was the defending champion but lost in the first round to Marco Cecchinato.

Yannick Hanfmann won the title after defeating Bernabé Zapata Miralles 6–3, 6–3 in the final.

== Seeds ==
1. (Spain) Roberto Carballés Baena (second round)
2. (Italy) Marco Cecchinato (quarterfinals)
3. (Italy) Federico Gaio (quarterfinals)
4. (Germany) Cedrik-Marcel Stebe (quarterfinals)
5. (Argentina) Facundo Bagnis (quarterfinals, retired)
6. (France) Antoine Hoang (semifinals)
7. (Germany) Yannick Hanfmann (champion)
8. (Italy) Lorenzo Giustino (first round)

== Draw ==
=== Key ===
- Q = Qualifier
- WC = Wild card
- LL = Lucky loser
- Alt = Alternate
- SE = Special exempt
- PR = Protected ranking
- ITF = ITF entry
- JE = Junior exempt
- w/o = Walkover
- r = Retired
- d = Defaulted
- SR = Special ranking

=== Finals ===
Semifinals
(Spain) Bernabé Zapata Miralles	6	6
6	(France) Antoine Hoang	2	3
(Italy) Gian Marco Moroni	6^{4}	1
7	(Germany) Yannick Hanfmann	7^{7}	6

Final
(Spain) Bernabé Zapata Miralles	3	3
7	(Germany) Yannick Hanfmann	6	6

=== Top half ===
First round
1	(Spain) R Carballés Baena	6	6
(Austria) J Rodionov	2	1
(Italy) R Marcora	3	1
(Spain) B Zapata Miralles	6	6
WC	(Italy) G Zeppieri	6	7^{7}
(Argentina) R Olivo	2	6^{4}
(France) H Gaston	4	6	1
5	(Argentina) F Bagnis	6	4	6
3	(Italy) F Gaio	3	6	7
(Italy) M Viola	6	3	5
(Italy) A Giannessi	6	6
(France) M Janvier	2	3
Q	(Italy) A Arnaboldi	3	6^{3}
(Spain) M Vilella Martínez	6	7^{7}
(France) H Grenier	4	6	3
6	(France) A Hoang	6	3	6

Second round
1	(Spain) R Carballés Baena	2	1
(Spain) B Zapata Miralles	6	6
WC	(Italy) G Zeppieri	2	4
5	(Argentina) F Bagnis	6	6
3	(Italy) F Gaio	6	6
(Italy) A Giannessi	4	2
(Spain) M Vilella Martínez	6	3	4
6	(France) A Hoang	4	6	6

Quarterfinals
(Spain) B Zapata Miralles	5
5	(Argentina) F Bagnis	3^{r}
3	(Italy) F Gaio	5	6	4
6	(France) A Hoang	7	4	6

Semifinals
(Spain) B Zapata Miralles	6	6
6	(France) A Hoang	2	3

=== Bottom half ===
First round
8	(Italy) L Giustino	6	3	2
(Germany) D Altmaier	3	6	6
(Italy) GM Moroni	6	6
Q	(Spain) C Alcaraz	3	2
(France) E Benchetrit	6	6
(Argentina) F Mena	1	4
Q	(Italy) A Vavassori	1	3
4	(Germany) C-M Stebe	6	6
7	(Germany) Y Hanfmann	6	7
Q	(Croatia) V Galović	4	5
WC	(Italy) F Forti	6^{4}	3
WC	(Italy) L Musetti	7^{7}	6
(Argentina) JP Ficovich	4	6	6
(Argentina) M Trungelliti	6	4	2
(Argentina) A Collarini	3	6	3
2	(Italy) M Cecchinato	6	1	6

Second round
(Germany) D Altmaier	6	4	4
(Italy) GM Moroni	3	6	6
(France) E Benchetrit	4	0
4	(Germany) C-M Stebe	6	6
7	(Germany) Y Hanfmann	3	6	6
WC	(Italy) L Musetti	6	4	3
(Argentina) JP Ficovich	3	4
2	(Italy) M Cecchinato	6	6

Quarterfinals
(Italy) GM Moroni	2	7	6
4	(Germany) C-M Stebe	6	5	3
7	(Germany) Y Hanfmann	6	6
2	(Italy) M Cecchinato	4	4

Semifinals
(Italy) GM Moroni	6^{4}	1
7	(Germany) Y Hanfmann	7^{7}	6
