= 2010 Cerveza Club Premium Open – Singles =

Singles
- 2010 Cerveza Club Premium Open

Final
- Champion: (Ecuador) Giovanni Lapentti
- Runner-up: (Brazil) João Souza
- Score: 2–6, 6–3, 6–4

Events
Singles	Doubles
- Cerveza Club Premium Open

Carlos Salamanca was the defending champion, but he lost to Júlio César Campozano already in the first round.
Giovanni Lapentti, who received wildcard into the singles main draw, won this tournament, by defeating João Souza 2–6, 6–3, 6–4 in the final.

== Seeds ==
1. (Brazil) João Souza (final)
2. (Brazil) Marcos Daniel (second round)
3. (Brazil) Rogério Dutra da Silva (semifinals)
4. (Colombia) Carlos Salamanca (first round)
5. (Germany) Andre Begemann (first round)
6. (Brazil) Júlio Silva (first round, retired)
7. (Colombia) Robert Farah (quarterfinals)
8. (Argentina) Sebastián Decoud (semifinals)

== Draw ==
Key

- Q = Qualifier
- WC = Wild card
- LL = Lucky loser
- Alt = Alternate
- ITF = ITF entry
- PR = Protected ranking
- SR = Special ranking
- SE = Special exempt
- JE = Junior exempt
- JR = Junior Accelerator Programme entrant
- CO = College Accelerator Programme entrant
- NG = Next Gen Accelerator Program entrant
- w/o = Walkover
- r = Retired
- d = Defaulted

=== Finals ===
Semifinals
1	(Brazil) João Souza	7	7
3	(Brazil) Rogério Dutra da Silva	6^{1}	6^{4}
WC	(Ecuador) Giovanni Lapentti	4	7	7
8	(Argentina) Sebastián Decoud	6	6^{5}	6^{9}

Final
1	(Brazil) João Souza	6	3	4
WC	(Ecuador) Giovanni Lapentti	2	6	6

=== Top half ===
First round
1	(Brazil) J Souza	6^{4}	7	7
(Germany) G Kretschmer	7	6^{5}	6^{4}
(Brazil) C Zampieri	6	6^{2}	1
(Brazil) E Ribeiro Neto	3	7	6
(Monaco) B Balleret	6^{4}	4
(United States) E Nunez	7	6
Q	(Argentina) D Álvarez	6^{1}	7	1
6	(Brazil) J Silva	7	5	0^{r}
3	(Brazil) R Dutra da Silva	7	6
(France) J Dasnières de Veigy	5	4
Q	(South Korea) D Yoo	3	6	5
(United States) G Ouellette	6	4	7
(Colombia) JS Cabal	3	6^{4}
(Ecuador) I Endara	6	7
(Brazil) L Kirche	6^{3}	6^{4}
7	(Colombia) R Farah	7	7

Second round
1	(Brazil) J Souza	6	6
(Brazil) E Ribeiro Neto	4	4
(United States) E Nunez	6^{8}	3
Q	(Argentina) D Álvarez	7	6
3	(Brazil) R Dutra da Silva	6	6
(United States) G Ouellette	3	3
(Ecuador) I Endara	4	6^{5}
7	(Colombia) R Farah	6	7

Quarterfinals
1	(Brazil) J Souza	6^{11}	6	6
Q	(Argentina) D Álvarez	7	4	2
3	(Brazil) R Dutra da Silva	6^{4}	6	7
7	(Colombia) R Farah	7	3	6^{9}

Semifinals
1	(Brazil) J Souza	7	7
3	(Brazil) R Dutra da Silva	6^{1}	6^{4}

=== Bottom half ===
First round
5	(Germany) A Begemann	5	4
WC	(Ecuador) G Lapentti	7	6
(Brazil) A Miele	6	6
WC	(Ecuador) W Valarezo	0	3
Q	(United States) M Sykut	6^{4}	4
(Brazil) R Hocevar	7	6
WC	(Ecuador) JC Campozano	1	6	6
4	(Colombia) C Salamanca	6	3	4
8	(Argentina) S Decoud	7	7
Q	(Brazil) T Lopes	6^{5}	6^{2}
LL	(United States) C Racz	2	1
(Mexico) D Garza	6	6
WC	(Ecuador) R Quiroz	6	1	4
(Colombia) A González	2	6	6
(Dominican Republic) V Estrella	3	6	1
2	(Brazil) M Daniel	6	3	6

Second round
WC	(Ecuador) G Lapentti	6	6^{2}	6
(Brazil) A Miele	2	7	2
(Brazil) R Hocevar	6	7
WC	(Ecuador) JC Campozano	2	6^{4}
8	(Argentina) S Decoud	7	7
(Mexico) D Garza	5	5
(Colombia) A González	6	6
2	(Brazil) M Daniel	4	3

Quarterfinals
WC	(Ecuador) G Lapentti	6	3	6
(Brazil) R Hocevar	2	6	3
8	(Argentina) S Decoud	6	6
(Colombia) A González	3	1

Semifinals
WC	(Ecuador) G Lapentti	4	7	7
8	(Argentina) S Decoud	6	6^{5}	6^{9}
