= 2021 Quito Challenger – Singles =

Singles
- 2021 Quito Challenger

Final
- Champion: (Argentina) Facundo Mena
- Runner-up: (Chile) Gonzalo Lama
- Score: 6–4, 6–4

Events
Singles	Doubles
- Quito Challenger

Nicolás Jarry was the defending champion but chose not to defend his title.

Facundo Mena won the title after defeating Gonzalo Lama 6–4, 6–4 in the final.

== Seeds ==
1. (Slovakia) Andrej Martin (first round)
2. (Ecuador) Emilio Gómez (second round)
3. (Spain) Mario Vilella Martínez (second round)
4. (Argentina) Renzo Olivo (second round)
5. (Argentina) Juan Pablo Ficovich (quarterfinals)
6. (Argentina) Facundo Mena (champion)
7. (Argentina) Thiago Agustín Tirante (quarterfinals)
8. (Ecuador) Roberto Quiroz (second round)

== Draw ==
Key

- Q = Qualifier
- WC = Wild card
- LL = Lucky loser
- Alt = Alternate
- ITF = ITF entry
- PR = Protected ranking
- SR = Special ranking
- SE = Special exempt
- JE = Junior exempt
- JR = Junior Accelerator Programme entrant
- CO = College Accelerator Programme entrant
- NG = Next Gen Accelerator Program entrant
- w/o = Walkover
- r = Retired
- d = Defaulted

=== Finals ===
Semifinals
(Spain) Pol Martín Tiffon	6^{11}	4
(Chile) Gonzalo Lama	7^{13}	6
6	(Argentina) Facundo Mena	6	4	6
Q	(France) Alexis Gautier	2	6	2

Final
(Chile) Gonzalo Lama	4	4
6	(Argentina) Facundo Mena	6	6

=== Top half ===
First round
1	(Slovakia) A Martin	6^{6}	5
(Spain) P Martín Tiffon	7^{8}	7
(Colombia) A González	6	7^{7}
Q	(Switzerland) L Castelnuovo	2	6^{4}
(Spain) Eduard Esteve Lobato	6	6
(Portugal) G Oliveira	2	3
(Monaco) L Catarina	2	4
5	(Argentina) JP Ficovich	6	6
3	(Spain) M Vilella Martínez	6	6^{5}	6
Q	(United States) Christian Langmo	3	7^{7}	2
(Chile) G Lama	7	4	6
WC	(Ecuador) A Guillén Meza	5	6	2
(Spain) C Gómez-Herrera	2	4
(Spain) A Menéndez Maceiras	6	6
(United States) P Kypson	7^{9}	1	3
7	(Argentina) TA Tirante	6^{7}	6	6

Second round
(Spain) P Martín Tiffon	4	7^{7}	6
(Colombia) A González	6	6^{4}	3
(Spain) E Esteve Lobato	6	6^{5}	4
5	(Argentina) JP Ficovich	2	7^{7}	6
3	(Spain) M Vilella Martínez	6	6^{4}	3
(Chile) G Lama	3	7^{7}	6
(Spain) A Menéndez Maceiras	5	2
7	(Argentina) TA Tirante	7	6

Quarterfinals
(Spain) P Martín Tiffon	3	6	6
5	(Argentina) JP Ficovich	6	3	4
(Chile) G Lama	7^{7}	7^{7}
7	(Argentina) TA Tirante	6^{5}	6^{4}

Semifinals
(Spain) P Martín Tiffon	6^{11}	4
(Chile) G Lama	7^{13}	6

=== Bottom half ===
First round
6	(Argentina) F Mena	7^{8}	7
Q	(Colombia) A Gómez	6^{6}	5
(Argentina) Matías Zukas	7^{7}	5	6^{4}
(Colombia) C Rodríguez	6^{4}	7	7^{7}
(Argentina) GA Olivieri	3	6	7
(Spain) O Roca Batalla	6	3	5
(Argentina) G Villanueva	4	4
4	(Argentina) R Olivo	6	6
8	(Ecuador) R Quiroz	6	7
(Ecuador) D Hidalgo	4	5
(France) Matthieu Perchicot	6	6
WC	(Ecuador) AC March	4	0
(Switzerland) J Nikles	0	4
Q	(France) Alexis Gautier	6	6
WC	(Ecuador) Gian Carlos Rodríguez	1	2
2	(Ecuador) E Gómez	6	6

Second round
6	(Argentina) F Mena	6	6
(Colombia) C Rodríguez	2	4
(Argentina) GA Olivieri	6	6
4	(Argentina) R Olivo	2	2
8	(Ecuador) R Quiroz	6	2	3
(France) M Perchicot	2	6	6
Q	(France) A Gautier	7	7^{7}
2	(Ecuador) E Gómez	5	6^{2}

Quarterfinals
6	(Argentina) F Mena	6	6
(Argentina) GA Olivieri	4	0
(France) M Perchicot	4	3
Q	(France) A Gautier	6	6

Semifinals
6	(Argentina) F Mena	6	4	6
Q	(France) A Gautier	2	6	2
