= 2014 Quito Challenger =

- Date: 15–21 September
- Edition: 20th
- Surface: Clay
- Location: Quito, Ecuador

Champions

Singles
- (Argentina) Horacio Zeballos

Doubles
- (Brazil) Marcelo Demoliner / (Brazil) João Souza
- Quito Challenger

The 2014 Quito Challenger was a professional tennis tournament played on clay courts. It was the 20th edition of the tournament which was part of the 2014 ATP Challenger Tour. It took place in Quito, Ecuador between 15 and 21 September 2014.

== Singles main-draw entrants ==
=== Seeds ===
Country	Player	Rank^{1}	Seed
DOM	Víctor Estrella Burgos	69	1
BRA	João Souza	103	2
ARG	Horacio Zeballos	112	3
ARG	Guido Pella	158	4
USA	Austin Krajicek	164	5
USA	Chase Buchanan	168	6
ARG	Juan Ignacio Londero	186	7
CRO	Nikola Mektić	230	8

- ^{1} Rankings are as of September 8, 2014.

=== Other entrants ===
The following players received wildcards into the singles main draw:

- (United States) Chase Buchanan
- (Ecuador) Julio César Campozano
- (Ecuador) Gonzalo Escobar
- (United States) David Konstantinov

The following player entered into the singles main draw with a protected ranking:

- (Mexico) Miguel Ángel Reyes-Varela

The following players received entry from the qualifying draw:

- (El Salvador) Marcelo Arévalo
- (Ecuador) Iván Endara
- (Argentina) Facundo Mena
- (Brazil) André Miele

== Champions ==
=== Singles ===
- (Argentina) Horacio Zeballos def. (Chile) Nicolás Jarry, 6–4, 7–6^{(11–9)}

=== Doubles ===
- (Brazil) Marcelo Demoliner / (Brazil) João Souza def. (Peru) Duilio Beretta / (Uruguay) Martín Cuevas, 6–4, 6–4
