= 2014 Quito Challenger – Singles =

Singles
- 2014 Quito Challenger

Final
- Champion: (Argentina) Horacio Zeballos
- Runner-up: (Chile) Nicolás Jarry
- Score: 6–4, 7–6^{(11–9)}

Events
Singles	Doubles
- Quito Challenger

Víctor Estrella Burgos was the defending champion, but lost to Gonzalo Escobar in the second round.

Horacio Zeballos won the title by defeating Nicolás Jarry 6–4, 7–6^{(11–9)} in the final.

== Seeds ==
1. (Dominican Republic) Víctor Estrella Burgos (second round)
2. (Brazil) João Souza (semifinals)
3. (Argentina) Horacio Zeballos (champion)
4. (Argentina) Guido Pella (second round)
5. (United States) Austin Krajicek (first round)
6. (United States) Chase Buchanan (quarterfinals)
7. (Argentina) Juan Ignacio Londero (quarterfinals)
8. (Croatia) Nikola Mektić (first round)

== Draw ==
Key

- Q = Qualifier
- WC = Wild card
- LL = Lucky loser
- Alt = Alternate
- ITF = ITF entry
- PR = Protected ranking
- SR = Special ranking
- SE = Special exempt
- JE = Junior exempt
- JR = Junior Accelerator Programme entrant
- CO = College Accelerator Programme entrant
- NG = Next Gen Accelerator Program entrant
- w/o = Walkover
- r = Retired
- d = Defaulted

=== Finals ===
Semifinals
(Argentina) Andrés Molteni	7	4	5
3	(Argentina) Horacio Zeballos	5	6	7
(Chile) Nicolás Jarry	6^{4}	6	6
2	(Brazil) João Souza	7^{7}	3	3

Final
3	(Argentina) Horacio Zeballos	6	7^{11}
(Chile) Nicolás Jarry	4	6^{9}

=== Top half ===
First round
1	(Dominican Republic) V Estrella Burgos	6	6
(Brazil) Wilson Leite	2	4
WC	(Ecuador) G Escobar	2	6	6
(Peru) D Beretta	6	3	4
Q	(Ecuador) I Endara	5	4
(Argentina) A Molteni	7	6
Q	(Argentina) F Mena	6	7^{7}
5	(United States) A Krajicek	4	6^{4}
3	(Argentina) H Zeballos	6	6
(Uruguay) M Cuevas	4	4
WC	(Ecuador) J César Campozano	3	4
(United States) K King	6	6
(Bolivia) H Dellien	6	7
(Colombia) J Carlos Spir	2	5
(Greece) T Angelinos	6	6
8	(Croatia) N Mektić	3	4

Second round
1	(Dominican Republic) V Estrella Burgos	6	3	6^{4}
WC	(Ecuador) G Escobar	4	6	7^{7}
(Argentina) A Molteni	4	7^{7}	6
Q	(Argentina) F Mena	6	6^{5}	2
3	(Argentina) H Zeballos	7^{10}	5	6
(United States) K King	6^{8}	7	3
(Bolivia) H Dellien	7^{7}	6
(Greece) T Angelinos	6^{4}	4

Quarterfinals
WC	(Ecuador) G Escobar	4	0
(Argentina) A Molteni	6	6
3	(Argentina) H Zeballos	7	7^{7}
(Bolivia) H Dellien	5	6^{5}

Semifinals
(Argentina) A Molteni	7	3	5
3	(Argentina) H Zeballos	5	6	7

=== Bottom half ===
First round
7	(Argentina) J Ignacio Londero	7	6^{6}	7^{7}
Q	(El Salvador) M Arévalo	5	7^{8}	6^{2}
(Colombia) E Struvay	4	6	6
(Brazil) Henrique Cunha	6	2	2
(Chile) N Jarry	6	6
(Argentina) A Velotti	3	4
(Ecuador) G Lapentti	4	2
4	(Argentina) G Pella	6	6
6/WC	(United States) C Buchanan	6	6
(Argentina) M Trungelliti	3	4
(Argentina) T Lipovšek Puches	6	2	4
Q	(Brazil) A Miele	3	6	6
WC	(United States) David Konstantinov	3	0
(Ecuador) E Gómez	6	6
LL	(Peru) M Echazu	3	2
2	(Brazil) J Souza	6	6

Second round
7	(Argentina) J Ignacio Londero	6^{4}	7^{7}	6
(Colombia) E Struvay	7^{7}	6^{1}	3
(Chile) N Jarry	7^{7}	6
4	(Argentina) G Pella	6^{1}	2
6/WC	(United States) C Buchanan	6	6^{3}	6
Q	(Brazil) A Miele	2	7^{7}	1
(Ecuador) E Gómez	2	3
2	(Brazil) J Souza	6	6

Quarterfinals
7	(Argentina) J Ignacio Londero	2	5
(Chile) N Jarry	6	7
6/WC	(United States) C Buchanan	6^{1}	3
2	(Brazil) J Souza	7^{7}	6

Semifinals
(Chile) N Jarry	6^{4}	6	6
2	(Brazil) J Souza	7^{7}	3	3

== Bibliography ==
- Main draw
- Qualifying draw
