= 2021 Internazionali di Tennis Città di Todi – Singles =

Singles
- 2021 Internazionali di Tennis Città di Todi

Final
- Champion: (Spain) Mario Vilella Martínez
- Runner-up: (Italy) Federico Gaio
- Score: 7–6^{(7–3)}, 1–6, 6–3

Events
Singles	Doubles
← 2020 ·	Internazionali di Tennis Città di Todi	· 2022 →

Yannick Hanfmann was the defending champion but chose not to defend his title.

Mario Vilella Martínez won the title after defeating Federico Gaio 7–6^{(7–3)}, 1–6, 6–3 in the final.

== Seeds ==
1. (Italy) Federico Gaio (final)
2. (Spain) Mario Vilella Martínez (champion)
3. (Kazakhstan) Dmitry Popko (second round)
4. (Argentina) Tomás Martín Etcheverry (semifinals)
5. (Argentina) Renzo Olivo (first round)
6. (Argentina) Andrea Collarini (second round)
7. (Italy) Gian Marco Moroni (first round)
8. (Italy) Lorenzo Giustino (first round)

== Draw ==
=== Key ===
- Q = Qualifier
- WC = Wild card
- LL = Lucky loser
- Alt = Alternate
- SE = Special exempt
- PR = Protected ranking
- ITF = ITF entry
- JE = Junior exempt
- w/o = Walkover
- r = Retired
- d = Defaulted
- SR = Special ranking

=== Finals ===
Semifinals
1	(Italy) Federico Gaio	6	6
4	(Argentina) Tomás Martín Etcheverry	2	2
Q	(Brazil) Matheus Pucinelli de Almeida	6^{4}	6	1
2	(Spain) Mario Vilella Martínez	7^{7}	3	6

Final
1	(Italy) Federico Gaio	6^{3}	6	3
2	(Spain) Mario Vilella Martínez	7^{7}	1	6

=== Top half ===
First round
1	(Italy) F Gaio	6	6
PR	(Croatia) V Galović	3	2
Alt	(Tunisia) S Mansouri	3	2
(Argentina) TA Tirante	6	6
WC	(Italy) F Cobolli	3	6	6
(Brazil) P Sakamoto	6	4	3
(Portugal) J Domingues	2	3
6	(Argentina) A Collarini	6	6
4	(Argentina) TM Etcheverry	6	7^{7}
(Italy) M Viola	4	6^{4}
(Italy) J Ocleppo	3	6	4
Q	(Italy) M Arnaldi	6	1	6
(Italy) A Arnaboldi	1	6^{4}
(United States) A Ritschard	6	7^{7}
Q	(Italy) G Fonio	6	6
8	(Italy) L Giustino	4	3

Second round
1	(Italy) F Gaio	6^{1}	6	7^{7}
(Argentina) TA Tirante	7^{7}	1	6^{2}
WC	(Italy) F Cobolli	6	6
6	(Argentina) A Collarini	4	3
4	(Argentina) TM Etcheverry	2	6	4
Q	(Italy) M Arnaldi	6	3	1^{r}
(United States) A Ritschard	6	6
Q	(Italy) G Fonio	3	4

Quarterfinals
1	(Italy) F Gaio	7	6
WC	(Italy) F Cobolli	5	4
4	(Argentina) TM Etcheverry	6	6
(United States) A Ritschard	1	1

Semifinals
1	(Italy) F Gaio	6	6
4	(Argentina) TM Etcheverry	2	2

=== Bottom half ===
First round
7	(Italy) GM Moroni	0	3
(Chile) N Jarry	6	6
(Argentina) P Cachin	6	6
Alt	(Argentina) F Díaz Acosta	3	4
(Italy) F Baldi	6	4	1
Q	(Brazil) M Pucinelli de Almeida	1	6	6
WC	(Italy) F Passaro	7	2	2
3	(Kazakhstan) D Popko	5	6	6
5	(Argentina) R Olivo	6^{5}	4
Q	(France) A Cazaux	7^{7}	6
(Italy) A Pellegrino	6^{2}	6^{4}
(Italy) G Zeppieri	7^{7}	7^{7}
WC	(Italy) F Forti	6	6^{5}	6
LL	(Italy) F Agamenone	2	7^{7}	3
(France) T Lamasine	2	6^{4}
2	(Spain) M Vilella Martínez	6	7^{7}

Second round
(Chile) N Jarry	4	6	7
(Argentina) P Cachin	6	4	5
Q	(Brazil) M Pucinelli de Almeida	3	6	6
3	(Kazakhstan) D Popko	6	1	2
Q	(France) A Cazaux	3	3
(Italy) G Zeppieri	6	6
WC	(Italy) F Forti	3	1
2	(Spain) M Vilella Martínez	6	6

Quarterfinals
(Chile) N Jarry	6	3	1
Q	(Brazil) M Pucinelli de Almeida	3	6	6
(Italy) G Zeppieri	3	3
2	(Spain) M Vilella Martínez	6	6

Semifinals
Q	(Brazil) M Pucinelli de Almeida	6^{4}	6	1
2	(Spain) M Vilella Martínez	7^{7}	3	6
