= 2021 Internazionali di Tennis Città di Todi =

- Date: 12–18 July
- Edition: 15th
- Surface: Clay
- Location: Todi, Italy

Champions

Singles
- (Spain) Mario Vilella Martínez

Doubles
- (Italy) Francesco Forti / (Italy) Giulio Zeppieri
← 2020 ·	Internazionali di Tennis Città di Todi	· 2022 →

The 2021 Internazionali di Tennis Città di Todi was a professional tennis tournament played on clay courts. It was the 15th edition of the tournament which was part of the 2021 ATP Challenger Tour. It took place in Todi, Italy between 12 and 18 July 2021.

== Singles main-draw entrants ==
=== Seeds ===
Country	Player	Rank^{1}	Seed
ITA	Federico Gaio	145	1
ESP	Mario Vilella Martínez	179	2
KAZ	Dmitry Popko	187	3
ARG	Tomás Martín Etcheverry	192	4
ARG	Renzo Olivo	193	5
ARG	Andrea Collarini	206	6
ITA	Gian Marco Moroni	218	7
ITA	Lorenzo Giustino	228	8

- ^{1} Rankings are as of 28 June 2021.

=== Other entrants ===
The following players received wildcards into the singles main draw:

- (Italy) Flavio Cobolli
- (Italy) Francesco Forti
- (Italy) Francesco Passaro

The following player received entry into the singles main draw using a protected ranking:

- (Croatia) Viktor Galović

The following players received entry into the singles main draw as alternates:

- (Argentina) Facundo Díaz Acosta
- (Tunisia) Skander Mansouri

The following players received entry from the qualifying draw:

- (Italy) Matteo Arnaldi
- (France) Arthur Cazaux
- (Italy) Giovanni Fonio
- (Brazil) Matheus Pucinelli de Almeida

The following player received entry as a lucky loser:

- (Italy) Franco Agamenone

== Champions ==
=== Singles ===
- (Spain) Mario Vilella Martínez def. (Italy) Federico Gaio 7–6^{(7–3)}, 1–6, 6–3.

=== Doubles ===
- (Italy) Francesco Forti / (Italy) Giulio Zeppieri def. (Argentina) Facundo Díaz Acosta / (Peru) Alexander Merino 6–3, 6–2.
