= 2014 Quito Challenger – Doubles =

Doubles
- 2014 Quito Challenger

Final
- Champion: (Brazil) Marcelo Demoliner; (Brazil) João Souza
- Runner-up: (Peru) Duilio Beretta; (Uruguay) Martín Cuevas
- Score: 6–4, 6–4

Events
| Singles | Doubles |
- Quito Challenger

Kevin King and Juan Carlos Spir were the defending champions, but lost to Duilio Beretta and Martín Cuevas in the quarterfinals.

Marcelo Demoliner and João Souza won the title by defeating Duilio Beretta and Martín Cuevas 6–4, 6–4 in the final.

== Seeds ==
1. (United States) Austin Krajicek / (Argentina) Horacio Zeballos (semifinals)
2. (United States) Kevin King / (Colombia) Juan Carlos Spir (quarterfinals)
3. (Argentina) Andrés Molteni / (Mexico) César Ramírez (first round)
4. (Brazil) Marcelo Demoliner / (Brazil) João Souza (champions)

== Draw ==
Key

- Q = Qualifier
- WC = Wild card
- LL = Lucky loser
- Alt = Alternate
- ITF = ITF entry
- PR = Protected ranking
- SR = Special ranking
- SE = Special exempt
- JE = Junior exempt
- JR = Junior Accelerator Programme entrant
- CO = College Accelerator Programme entrant
- NG = Next Gen Accelerator Program entrant
- w/o = Walkover
- r = Retired
- d = Defaulted

=== Draw ===
First round

Quarterfinals

Semifinals

Final

1
- (United States) A Krajicek
- (Argentina) H Zeballos
7
4
[10]

- (Chile) N Jarry
- (South Africa) D O'Brien
5
6
[6]

1
- (United States) A Krajicek
- (Argentina) H Zeballos
7^{7}
6

WC
- (Ecuador) I Endara
- (Argentina) F Mena
7
6^{7}
[12]

WC
- (Ecuador) I Endara
- (Argentina) F Mena
6^{5}
4

- (Argentina) JI Londero
- (Argentina) G Pella
5
7^{9}
[10]

1
- (United States) A Krajicek
- (Argentina) H Zeballos
6^{9}
7^{7}
[11]

4
- (Brazil) M Demoliner
- (Brazil) J Souza
7
7^{7}

4
- (Brazil) M Demoliner
- (Brazil) J Souza
7^{11}
6^{1}
[13]

- (Argentina) T Lipovšek Puches
5
6^{3}

4
- (Brazil) M Demoliner
- (Brazil) J Souza
6
6

- (Peru) S Galdós
- (Argentina) M Trungelliti
6
6

- (Peru) S Galdós
- (Argentina) M Trungelliti
3
4

- (Bolivia) H Dellien
- (Ecuador) E Gómez
3
2

4
- (Brazil) M Demoliner
- (Brazil) J Souza
6
6

- (Greece) T Angelinos
- (Croatia) N Mektić
1
4

- (Peru) D Beretta
- (Uruguay) M Cuevas
4
4

- (El Salvador) M Arévalo
- (Puerto Rico) A Llompart
6
6

- (El Salvador) M Arévalo
- (Puerto Rico) A Llompart
6
3
[6]

- (Brazil) Henrique Cunha
- (Ecuador) G Escobar
7^{7}
6

- (Brazil) H Cunha
- (Ecuador) G Escobar
3
6
[10]

3
- (Argentina) A Molteni
- (Mexico) C Ramírez
6^{5}
4

- (Brazil) H Cunha
- (Ecuador) G Escobar
4
5

- (Peru) D Beretta
- (Uruguay) M Cuevas
6
3
[13]

- (Peru) D Beretta
- (Uruguay) M Cuevas
6
7

WC
- (Peru) M Echazú
- (Chile) G Rivera Aránguiz
2
6
[11]

- (Peru) D Beretta
- (Uruguay) M Cuevas
6
6

WC
- (United States) Sam Barnett
- (United States) C Buchanan
0
5

2
- (United States) K King
- (Colombia) JS Spir
3
3

2
- (United States) K King
- (Colombia) JS Spir
6
7
