= 2012 Quito Challenger – Singles =

Singles
- 2012 Quito Challenger

Final
- Champion: (Brazil) João Souza
- Runner-up: (France) Guillaume Rufin
- Score: 6–2, 7–6^{(7–4)}

Events
Singles	Doubles
← 2011 ·	Quito Challenger	· 2013 →

Sebastián Decoud was the defending champion, but lost in the second round.
João Souza won the title, defeating Guillaume Rufin 6–2, 7–6^{(7–4)} in the final.

== Seeds ==
1. (Portugal) Frederico Gil (first round)
2. (France) Guillaume Rufin (final)
3. (Argentina) Martín Alund (semifinals)
4. (Brazil) João Souza (champion)
5. (Argentina) Eduardo Schwank (quarterfinals)
6. (Dominican Republic) Víctor Estrella (quarterfinals, retired because of a right elbow injury)
7. (Colombia) Carlos Salamanca (first round)
8. (Ecuador) Júlio César Campozano (second round)

== Draw ==
=== Key ===
- Q = Qualifier
- WC = Wild card
- LL = Lucky loser
- Alt = Alternate
- SE = Special exempt
- PR = Protected ranking
- ITF = ITF entry
- JE = Junior exempt
- w/o = Walkover
- r = Retired
- d = Defaulted
- SR = Special ranking

=== Finals ===
Semifinals
WC	(Chile) Nicolás Massú	3	2
4	(Brazil) João Souza	6	6
3	(Argentina) Martín Alund	7^{11}	4	6^{2}
2	(France) Guillaume Rufin	6^{9}	6	7^{7}

Final
4	(Brazil) João Souza	6	7^{7}
2	(France) Guillaume Rufin	2	6^{4}

=== Top half ===
First round
1/Q	(Portugal) F Gil	7^{7}	5	4
(United States) D Zivkovic	6^{4}	7	6
Q	(Mexico) MA Reyes-Varela	4	4
WC	(Chile) N Massú	6	6
Q	(Ecuador) Juan Carvajal	6^{5}	6	2
(Australia) Chris Letcher	7^{7}	3	6
(Sweden) C Lindell	1	1^{r}
5	(Argentina) E Schwank	6	4
4	(Brazil) J Souza	7^{7}	7^{7}
(El Salvador) M Arévalo	6^{4}	6^{4}
(Colombia) N Barrientos	4	4
(Peru) D Beretta	6	6
WC	(United States) Lucas Dages	2	2
(United States) J Witten	6	6
(Mexico) D Garza	4	2
6	(Dominican Republic) V Estrella	6	6

Second round
(United States) D Zivkovic	6^{3}	3
WC	(Chile) N Massú	7^{7}	6
(Australia) Chris Letcher	3	2
5	(Argentina) E Schwank	6	6
4	(Brazil) J Souza	7	6^{2}	7
(Peru) D Beretta	5	7^{7}	5
(United States) J Witten	2	2
6	(Dominican Republic) V Estrella	6	6

Quarterfinals
WC	(Chile) N Massú	6	6
5	(Argentina) E Schwank	4	2
4	(Brazil) J Souza	7^{7}	3
6	(Dominican Republic) V Estrella	6^{4}	0^{r}

Semifinals
WC	(Chile) N Massú	3	2
4	(Brazil) J Souza	6	6

=== Bottom half ===
First round
8	(Ecuador) JC Campozano	7^{7}	6^{4}	7
(France) L Recouderc	6^{2}	7^{7}	5
(Argentina) A Molteni	6	6
WC	(Ecuador) José Chamba Gómez	0	0
(Argentina) Guillermo Durán	6	6
(United States) K Kim	2	4
(Argentina) Maximiliano Estévez	4	1
3	(Argentina) M Alund	6	6
7	(Colombia) C Salamanca	6^{4}	7	4
(Colombia) JS Cabal	7^{7}	5	6
(Argentina) S Decoud	6	6
WC	(United States) Joseph Correa	1	2
(Brazil) M Demoliner	6	7^{7}
(Chile) G Rivera-Aránguiz	3	6^{5}
Q	(Montenegro) G Tošić	6^{3}	1
2	(France) G Rufin	7^{7}	6

Second round
8	(Ecuador) JC Campozano	6^{2}	4
(Argentina) A Molteni	7^{7}	6
(Argentina) Guillermo Durán	7^{7}	6^{4}	1
3	(Argentina) M Alund	6^{1}	7^{7}	6
(Colombia) JS Cabal	6	6
(Argentina) S Decoud	4	1
(Brazil) M Demoliner	1	4
2	(France) G Rufin	6	6

Quarterfinals
(Argentina) A Molteni	2	6^{6}
3	(Argentina) M Alund	6	7^{8}
(Colombia) JS Cabal	6	6^{12}	3
2	(France) G Rufin	4	7^{14}	6

Semifinals
3	(Argentina) M Alund	7^{11}	4	6^{2}
2	(France) G Rufin	6^{9}	6	7^{7}
