= 2010 Cerveza Club Premium Open – Doubles =

Doubles
- 2010 Cerveza Club Premium Open

Final
- Champions: (Mexico) Daniel Garza (United States) Eric Nunez
- Runners-up: (Colombia) Alejandro González (Colombia) Carlos Salamanca
- Score: 7–5, 6–4

Events
Singles	Doubles
- Cerveza Club Premium Open

Santiago González and Travis Rettenmaier were the defending champions and did not participate this year.
Another Mexican-American pair: Daniel Garza and Eric Nunez won in the final of this year's edition. They defeated Alejandro González and Carlos Salamanca 7–5, 6–4 in the final.

== Seeds ==
1. (Germany) Andre Begemann / (Germany) Martin Emmrich (quarterfinals)
2. (Germany) Gero Kretschmer / (Germany) Alex Satschko (quarterfinals)
3. (Brazil) ~~Ricardo Hocevar~~ / (Brazil) ~~Caio Zampieri~~ (withdrew due to Zampieri's right arm injury)
4. (Colombia) Juan Sebastián Cabal / (Colombia) Robert Farah (first round)

== Draw ==
Key

- Q = Qualifier
- WC = Wild card
- LL = Lucky loser
- Alt = Alternate
- ITF = ITF entry
- PR = Protected ranking
- SR = Special ranking
- SE = Special exempt
- JE = Junior exempt
- JR = Junior Accelerator Programme entrant
- CO = College Accelerator Programme entrant
- NG = Next Gen Accelerator Program entrant
- w/o = Walkover
- r = Retired
- d = Defaulted

=== Draw ===
First round
1	(Germany) A Begemann (Germany) M Emmrich	6	6
WC	(Ecuador) C Luna Romero (Ecuador) H Minda	0	4
(Dominican Republic) V Estrella (Brazil) J Souza	6	6
(Monaco) B Balleret (France) J Dasnières de Veigy	4	2
4	(Colombia) JS Cabal (Colombia) R Farah	6	6^{6}	[4]
(Ecuador) I Endara (United States) M Sykut	4	7	[10]
WC	(Mexico) D Garza (United States) E Nunez	6	6^{4}	[10]
(United States) G Ouellette (South Korea) D Yoo	4	7	[6]
(Argentina) D Álvarez (Argentina) S Decoud	4	4
(Ecuador) JC Campozano (Mexico) B Rodríguez	6	6
(Brazil) R Grilli (Brazil) L Kirche	6	6
ALT	(Brazil) T Lopes (Ecuador) W Valarezo	4	0
(Brazil) A Miele (Brazil) E Ribeiro Neto	6^{4}	2
(Colombia) A González (Colombia) C Salamanca	7	6
WC	(Ecuador) G Lapentti (Ecuador) R Quiroz	4	4
2	(Germany) G Kretschmer (Germany) A Satschko	6	6

Quarterfinals
1	(Germany) A Begemann (Germany) M Emmrich	6^{4}	6	[10]
(Dominican Republic) V Estrella (Brazil) J Souza	7	3	[12]
(Ecuador) I Endara (United States) M Sykut	6^{8}	7	[6]
WC	(Mexico) D Garza (United States) E Nunez	7	6^{6}	[10]
(Ecuador) JC Campozano (Mexico) B Rodríguez	^{w/o}
(Brazil) R Grilli (Brazil) L Kirche
(Colombia) A González (Colombia) C Salamanca	4	6	[10]
2	(Germany) G Kretschmer (Germany) A Satschko	6	1	[5]

Semifinals
(Dominican Republic) V Estrella (Brazil) J Souza	1	6^{4}
WC	(Mexico) D Garza (United States) E Nunez	6	7
(Brazil) R Grilli (Brazil) L Kirche	2	6	[10]
(Colombia) A González (Colombia) C Salamanca	6	4	[12]

Finals
WC	(Mexico) D Garza (United States) E Nunez	7	6
(Colombia) A González (Colombia) C Salamanca	5	4
