= 2013 Quito Challenger =

- Date: 16–22 September
- Edition: 19th
- Surface: Clay
- Location: Quito, Ecuador

Champions

Singles
- (Dominican Republic) Víctor Estrella

Doubles
- (United States) Kevin King / (Colombia) Juan Carlos Spir
- Quito Challenger

The 2013 Quito Challenger was a professional tennis tournament played on clay courts. It was the 19th edition of the tournament which was part of the 2013 ATP Challenger Tour. It took place in Quito, Ecuador between 16 and 22 September.

== Singles main draw entrants ==
=== Seeds ===
| Country | Player | Rank^{1} | Seed |
|---|---|---|---|
| BRA | João Souza | 118 | 1 |
| ARG | Renzo Olivo | 201 | 2 |
| ARG | Facundo Argüello | 232 | 3 |
| ARG | Marco Trungelliti | 258 | 4 |
| COL | Carlos Salamanca | 267 | 5 |
| DOM | Víctor Estrella Burgos | 271 | 6 |
| USA | Chase Buchanan | 320 | 7 |
| ECU | Emilio Gómez | 340 | 8 |

- ^{1} Rankings are as of September 9, 2013.

=== Other entrants ===
The following players received wildcards into the singles main draw:

- (United States) Sam Barnett
- (Ecuador) Gonzalo Escobar
- (Ecuador) Emilio Gómez
- (Ecuador) Giovanni Lapentti

The following players received entry from the qualifying draw:

- (Peru) Duilio Beretta
- (Ecuador) Iván Endara
- (Colombia) Felipe Mantilla
- (Colombia) Juan Carlos Spir

== Champions ==
=== Singles ===
- (Dominican Republic) Víctor Estrella def. (Argentina) Marco Trungelliti 2–6, 6–4, 6–4

=== Doubles ===
- (United States) Kevin King / (Colombia) Juan Carlos Spir def. (Guatemala) Christopher Diaz-Figueroa / (Colombia) Carlos Salamanca 7–5, 6–7^{(9–11)}, [11–9]
