= 2021 Quito Challenger – Doubles =

Doubles
- 2021 Quito Challenger

Final
- Champions: (Colombia) Alejandro Gómez (Argentina) Thiago Agustín Tirante
- Runners-up: (Spain) Adrián Menéndez Maceiras (Spain) Mario Vilella Martínez
- Score: 7–5, 6–7^{(5–7)}, [10–8]

Events
Singles	Doubles
- Quito Challenger

Marcelo Arévalo and Miguel Ángel Reyes-Varela were the defending champions but chose not to defend their title.

Alejandro Gómez and Thiago Agustín Tirante won the title after defeating Adrián Menéndez Maceiras and Mario Vilella Martínez 7–5, 6–7^{(5–7)}, [10–8] in the final.

== Seeds ==
1. (Ecuador) Diego Hidalgo / (Colombia) Cristian Rodríguez (quarterfinals)
2. (Spain) Adrián Menéndez Maceiras / (Spain) Mario Vilella Martínez (final)
3. (Spain) Eduard Esteve Lobato / (Spain) Oriol Roca Batalla (first round)
4. (Ecuador) Emilio Gómez / (Ecuador) Roberto Quiroz (first round)

== Draw ==
Key

- Q = Qualifier
- WC = Wild card
- LL = Lucky loser
- Alt = Alternate
- ITF = ITF entry
- PR = Protected ranking
- SR = Special ranking
- SE = Special exempt
- JE = Junior exempt
- JR = Junior Accelerator Programme entrant
- CO = College Accelerator Programme entrant
- NG = Next Gen Accelerator Program entrant
- w/o = Walkover
- r = Retired
- d = Defaulted

First round
1	(Ecuador) D Hidalgo (Colombia) C Rodríguez	7^{7}	6
(Monaco) L Catarina (United States) P Kypson	6^{2}	3
(Colombia) A Gómez (Argentina) TA Tirante	6	7
(Argentina) R Olivo (Argentina) Matías Zukas	3	5
4	(Ecuador) E Gómez (Ecuador) R Quiroz	2	7^{7}	[8]
(Argentina) JP Ficovich (Argentina) GA Olivieri	6	6^{5}	[10]
(Switzerland) L Castelnuovo (Switzerland) J Nikles	4	6	[6]
(Peru) A Merino (United States) JA Ore	6	3	[10]
(Slovakia) A Martin (Portugal) G Oliveira	6^{5}	7^{7}	[10]
WC	(Ecuador) AC March (Spain) P Martín Tiffon	7^{7}	6^{3}	[4]
WC	(Ecuador) A Guillén Meza (Argentina) G Villanueva	3	6	[10]
3	(Spain) Eduard Esteve Lobato (Spain) O Roca Batalla	6	3	[8]
(Chile) G Lama (Argentina) F Mena	4	4
(Spain) C Gómez-Herrera (Colombia) A González	6	6
WC	(Ecuador) Gian Carlos Rodríguez (Ecuador) Jorge Ruiz	0	1
2	(Spain) A Menéndez Maceiras (Spain) M Vilella Martínez	6	6

Quarterfinals
1	(Ecuador) D Hidalgo (Colombia) C Rodríguez	4	7	[7]
(Colombia) A Gómez (Argentina) TA Tirante	6	5	[10]
(Argentina) JP Ficovich (Argentina) GA Olivieri	6	7^{7}
(Peru) A Merino (United States) JA Ore	3	6^{4}
(Slovakia) A Martin (Portugal) G Oliveira	7^{7}	6
WC	(Ecuador) A Guillén Meza (Argentina) G Villanueva	6^{5}	4
(Spain) C Gómez-Herrera (Colombia) A González	5	6	[8]
2	(Spain) A Menéndez Maceiras (Spain) M Vilella Martínez	7	2	[10]

Semifinals
(Colombia) A Gómez (Argentina) TA Tirante	7^{7}	7^{11}
(Argentina) JP Ficovich (Argentina) GA Olivieri	6^{4}	6^{9}
(Slovakia) A Martin (Portugal) G Oliveira	4	6	[5]
2	(Spain) A Menéndez Maceiras (Spain) M Vilella Martínez	6	3	[10]

Final
(Colombia) A Gómez (Argentina) TA Tirante	7	6^{5}	[10]
2	(Spain) A Menéndez Maceiras (Spain) M Vilella Martínez	5	7^{7}	[8]
