= 2020 Internazionali di Tennis Città di Todi =

- Date: 17–23 August
- Edition: 14th
- Surface: Clay
- Location: Todi, Italy

Champions

Singles
- (Germany) Yannick Hanfmann

Doubles
- (Uruguay) Ariel Behar / (Kazakhstan) Andrey Golubev
← 2019 ·	Internazionali di Tennis Città di Todi	· 2021 →

The 2020 Internazionali di Tennis Città di Todi was a professional tennis tournament played on clay courts. It was the 14th edition of the tournament which was part of the 2020 ATP Challenger Tour. It took place in Todi, Italy between 17 and 23 August 2020.

== Singles main-draw entrants ==
=== Seeds ===
Country	Player	Rank^{1}	Seed
ESP	Roberto Carballés Baena	99	1
ITA	Marco Cecchinato	113	2
ITA	Federico Gaio	130	3
GER	Cedrik-Marcel Stebe	133	4
ARG	Facundo Bagnis	134	5
FRA	Antoine Hoang	136	6
GER	Yannick Hanfmann	143	7
ITA	Lorenzo Giustino	153	8

- ^{1} Rankings are as of 16 March 2020.

=== Other entrants ===
The following players received wildcards into the singles main draw:

- (Italy) Francesco Forti
- (Italy) Lorenzo Musetti
- (Italy) Giulio Zeppieri

The following players received entry from the qualifying draw:

- (Spain) Carlos Alcaraz
- (Italy) Andrea Arnaboldi
- (Croatia) Viktor Galović
- (Italy) Andrea Vavassori

== Champions ==
=== Singles ===
- (Germany) Yannick Hanfmann def. (Spain) Bernabé Zapata Miralles 6–3, 6–3.

=== Doubles ===
- (Uruguay) Ariel Behar / (Kazakhstan) Andrey Golubev def. (France) Elliot Benchetrit / (France) Hugo Gaston 6–4, 6–2.
