= 2013 Quito Challenger – Singles =

Singles
- 2013 Quito Challenger

Final
- Champion: (Dominican Republic) Víctor Estrella
- Runner-up: (Argentina) Marco Trungelliti
- Score: 2–6, 6–4, 6–4

Events
Singles	Doubles
- Quito Challenger

João Souza is the defending champion but lost in the first round to Giovanni Lapentti.
Víctor Estrella of the Dominican Republic won the title over Argentinian Marco Trungelliti 2–6, 6–4, 6–4.

== Seeds ==
1. (Brazil) João Souza (first round)
2. (Argentina) Renzo Olivo (quarterfinals)
3. (Argentina) Facundo Argüello (first round)
4. (Argentina) Marco Trungelliti (final)
5. (Colombia) Carlos Salamanca (quarterfinals)
6. (Dominican Republic) Víctor Estrella (champion)
7. (United States) Chase Buchanan (semifinals)
8. (Ecuador) Emilio Gómez (quarterfinals)

== Draw ==
Key

- Q = Qualifier
- WC = Wild card
- LL = Lucky loser
- Alt = Alternate
- ITF = ITF entry
- PR = Protected ranking
- SR = Special ranking
- SE = Special exempt
- JE = Junior exempt
- JR = Junior Accelerator Programme entrant
- CO = College Accelerator Programme entrant
- NG = Next Gen Accelerator Program entrant
- w/o = Walkover
- r = Retired
- d = Defaulted

=== Finals ===
Semifinals
WC	(Ecuador) Giovanni Lapentti	3	2
6	(Dominican Republic) Víctor Estrella Burgos	6	6
4	(Argentina) Marco Trungelliti	6	6
7	(United States) Chase Buchanan	4	2

Final
6	(Dominican Republic) Víctor Estrella Burgos	2	6	6
4	(Argentina) Marco Trungelliti	6	4	4

=== Top half ===
First round
1	(Brazil) J Souza	7^{11}	2	6^{5}
WC	(Ecuador) G Lapentti	6^{9}	6	7^{7}
LL	(United States) K King	6^{6}	5
(Italy) G Quinzi	7^{8}	7
WC	(Ecuador) G Escobar	6^{6}	6	6
(Guatemala) C Díaz Figueroa	7^{8}	3	3
(Argentina) F Coria	3	5
8/WC	(Ecuador) E Gómez	6	7
3	(Argentina) F Argüello	3	6^{5}
Q	(Colombia) JC Spir	6	7^{7}
(Barbados) D King	1	1
(Argentina) JI Londero	6	6
(Brazil) J Pereira	6	6^{5}	4
Q	(Peru) D Beretta	4	7^{7}	6
Q	(Ecuador) I Endara	4	4
6	(Dominican Republic) V Estrella Burgos	6	6

Second round
WC	(Ecuador) G Lapentti	6	7
(Italy) G Quinzi	4	5
WC	(Ecuador) G Escobar	0	2
8/WC	(Ecuador) E Gómez	6	6
Q	(Colombia) JC Spir	6	6
(Argentina) JI Londero	3	4
Q	(Peru) D Beretta	2	4
6	(Dominican Republic) V Estrella Burgos	6	6

Quarterfinals
WC	(Ecuador) G Lapentti	7^{8}	7
8/WC	(Ecuador) E Gómez	6^{6}	5
Q	(Colombia) JC Spir	6^{4}	6^{3}
6	(Dominican Republic) V Estrella Burgos	7^{7}	7^{7}

Semifinals
WC	(Ecuador) G Lapentti	3	2
6	(Dominican Republic) V Estrella Burgos	6	6

=== Bottom half ===
First round
5	(Colombia) C Salamanca	6	6
(Brazil) A Miele	3	4
Q	(Colombia) Felipe Mantilla	6	6
WC	(United States) Sam Barnett	0	1
(Bolivia) H Dellien	6	6
(Chile) JC Sáez	1	4
(Brazil) T Turini	7^{7}	6^{5}	4
4	(Argentina) M Trungelliti	6^{3}	7^{7}	6
7	(United States) C Buchanan	6	6
(Brazil) Wilson Leite	1	1
(Brazil) B Sant'Anna	6	3	7
(Peru) M Echazú	2	6	5
(Chile) G Rivera-Aránguiz	3	2
(Colombia) E Struvay	6	6
(Colombia) M Quintero	3	7^{7}	6^{3}
2	(Argentina) R Olivo	6	6^{2}	7^{7}

Second round
5	(Colombia) C Salamanca	6	6
Q	(Colombia) F Mantilla	1	4
(Bolivia) H Dellien	3	2
4	(Argentina) M Trungelliti	6	6
7	(United States) C Buchanan	6	6
(Brazil) B Sant'Anna	3	3
(Colombia) E Struvay	3	2
2	(Argentina) R Olivo	6	6

Quarterfinals
5	(Colombia) C Salamanca	5	4
4	(Argentina) M Trungelliti	7	6
7	(United States) C Buchanan	6	7^{7}
2	(Argentina) R Olivo	4	6^{0}

Semifinals
4	(Argentina) M Trungelliti	6	6
7	(United States) C Buchanan	4	2
