= 2019 Internazionali di Tennis Città dell'Aquila – Doubles =

Tennis tournament event

Doubles
- 2019 Internazionali di Tennis Città dell'Aquila

Final
- Champions: (Bosnia and Herzegovina) Tomislav Brkić (Croatia) Ante Pavić
- Runners-up: (Switzerland) Luca Margaroli (Italy) Andrea Vavassori
- Score: 6–3, 6–2

Events
| Singles | Doubles |
- Internazionali di Tennis Città dell'Aquila

Filippo Baldi and Andrea Pellegrino were the defending champions but chose not to defend their title.

Tomislav Brkić and Ante Pavić won the title after defeating Luca Margaroli and Andrea Vavassori 6–3, 6–2 in the final.

== Seeds ==
1. (Italy) Simone Bolelli / (Spain) David Vega Hernández (first round)
2. (Brazil) Fabrício Neis / (Brazil) Fernando Romboli (first round)
3. (Switzerland) Marc-Andrea Hüsler / (Chile) Hans Podlipnik Castillo (first round)
4. (Serbia) Nikola Čačić / (Croatia) Antonio Šančić (semifinals)

== Draw ==
Key

- Q = Qualifier
- WC = Wild card
- LL = Lucky loser
- Alt = Alternate
- ITF = ITF entry
- PR = Protected ranking
- SR = Special ranking
- SE = Special exempt
- JE = Junior exempt
- JR = Junior Accelerator Programme entrant
- CO = College Accelerator Programme entrant
- NG = Next Gen Accelerator Program entrant
- w/o = Walkover
- r = Retired
- d = Defaulted

First round
1 | (Italy) S Bolelli (Spain) D Vega Hernández | 7^{7} | 4 | [8]
(Bosnia and Herzegovina) T Brkić (Croatia) A Pavić | 6^{4} | 6 | [10]
ITF | (Italy) R Bonadio (Kazakhstan) D Popko | 6 | 6^{1} | [11]
WC | (Chile) MT Barrios Vera (Italy) Gian Marco Ortenzi | 3 | 7^{7} | [9]
4 | (Serbia) N Čačić (Croatia) A Šančić | 6 | 6
WC | (Italy) Alessio De Bernardis (Italy) Giorgio Portaluri | 2 | 2
(Ecuador) G Escobar (Venezuela) LD Martínez | 7^{7} | 4 | [11]
ITF | (Argentina) F Cerúndolo (France) Tom Jomby | 6^{2} | 6 | [9]
(Switzerland) L Margaroli (Italy) A Vavassori | 6 | 7^{7}
WC | (Italy) Gianluca Di Nicola (Colombia) A González | 2 | 6^{3}
(Russia) A Karatsev (Russia) P Kotov | 6 | 7
3 | (Switzerland) M-A Hüsler (Chile) H Podlipnik Castillo | 2 | 5
(Germany) A Begemann (Romania) F Mergea | 6 | 6
(Croatia) N Serdarušić (Chile) A Tabilo | 3 | 4
(Uruguay) M Cuevas (Argentina) F Mena | 7^{11} | 7^{7}
2 | (Brazil) F Neis (Brazil) F Romboli | 6^{9} | 6^{4}

Quarterfinals
(Bosnia and Herzegovina) T Brkić (Croatia) A Pavić | 6 | 6
ITF | (Italy) R Bonadio (Kazakhstan) D Popko | 4 | 3
4 | (Serbia) N Čačić (Croatia) A Šančić | 6 | 3 | [10]
(Ecuador) G Escobar (Venezuela) LD Martínez | 3 | 6 | [8]
(Switzerland) L Margaroli (Italy) A Vavassori | 6 | 6
(Russia) A Karatsev (Russia) P Kotov | 2 | 4
(Germany) A Begemann (Romania) F Mergea | 6^{15} | 6 | [10]
(Uruguay) M Cuevas (Argentina) F Mena | 7^{17} | 3 | [8]

Semifinals
(Bosnia and Herzegovina) T Brkić (Croatia) A Pavić | 6^{11} | 6 | [10]
4 | (Serbia) N Čačić (Croatia) A Šančić | 7^{13} | 4 | [4]
(Switzerland) L Margaroli (Italy) A Vavassori | 6 | 7
(Germany) A Begemann (Romania) F Mergea | 4 | 5

Final
(Bosnia and Herzegovina) T Brkić (Croatia) A Pavić | 6 | 6
(Switzerland) L Margaroli (Italy) A Vavassori | 3 | 2
