= 2010 Cerveza Club Premium Open =

- Date: 4–11 October
- Edition: 16th
- Location: Quito, Ecuador

Champions

Singles
- (Ecuador) Giovanni Lapentti

Doubles
- (Mexico) Daniel Garza / (United States) Eric Nunez
- Cerveza Club Premium Open

The 2010 Cerveza Club Premium Open was a professional tennis tournament played on outdoor red clay courts. It was the sixteenth edition of the tournament which was part of the 2010 ATP Challenger Tour. It took place in Quito, Ecuador between 4 and 11 October 2010.

== ATP entrants ==
=== Seeds ===
Country	Player	Rank^{1}	Seed
BRA	João Souza	112	1
BRA	Marcos Daniel	144	2
BRA	Rogério Dutra da Silva	179	3
COL	Carlos Salamanca	188	4
GER	Andre Begemann	202	5
BRA	Júlio Silva	205	6
COL	Robert Farah	209	7
ARG	Sebastián Decoud	210	8

- Rankings are as of September 27, 2010.

=== Other entrants ===
The following players received wildcards into the singles main draw:

- (Ecuador) Júlio César Campozano
- (Ecuador) Giovanni Lapentti
- (Ecuador) Roberto Quiroz
- (Ecuador) Walter Valarezo

The following players received entry from the qualifying draw:

- (Argentina) Diego Álvarez
- (Brazil) Tiago Lopes
- (United States) Maciek Sykut
- (South Korea) Daniel Yoo
- (United States) Christopher Racz (Lucky loser replacing Bruno Rodríguez)

== Champions ==
=== Singles ===
(Ecuador) Giovanni Lapentti def. (Brazil) João Souza, 2–6, 6–3, 6–4

=== Doubles ===
(Mexico) Daniel Garza / (United States) Eric Nunez def. (Colombia) Alejandro González / (Colombia) Carlos Salamanca, 7–5, 6–4
