= 2021 Internazionali di Tennis Città di Todi – Doubles =

Doubles
- 2021 Internazionali di Tennis Città di Todi

Final
- Champions: (Italy) Francesco Forti (Italy) Giulio Zeppieri
- Runners-up: (Argentina) Facundo Díaz Acosta (Peru) Alexander Merino
- Score: 6–3, 6–2

Events
Singles	Doubles
- Internazionali di Tennis Città di Todi

Ariel Behar and Andrey Golubev were the defending champions but chose not to defend their title.

Francesco Forti and Giulio Zeppieri won the title after defeating Facundo Díaz Acosta and Alexander Merino 6–3, 6–2 in the final.

== Seeds ==
1. (Netherlands) Mark Vervoort / (Bolivia) Federico Zeballos (semifinals)
2. (Italy) Flavio Cobolli / (Italy) Andrea Pellegrino (first round)
3. (Italy) Marco Bortolotti / (Colombia) Cristian Rodríguez (quarterfinals)
4. (Argentina) Tomás Martín Etcheverry / (Argentina) Thiago Agustín Tirante (quarterfinals, retired)

== Draw ==
Key

- Q = Qualifier
- WC = Wild card
- LL = Lucky loser
- Alt = Alternate
- ITF = ITF entry
- PR = Protected ranking
- SR = Special ranking
- SE = Special exempt
- JE = Junior exempt
- JR = Junior Accelerator Programme entrant
- CO = College Accelerator Programme entrant
- NG = Next Gen Accelerator Program entrant
- w/o = Walkover
- r = Retired
- d = Defaulted

First round
(Netherlands) M Hermans (Netherlands) G Smits	7^{7}	7
(Brazil) M Pucinelli de Almeida (Brazil) P Sakamoto	6^{5}	5
3	(Italy) M Bortolotti (Colombia) C Rodríguez	6	1	[10]
(Kazakhstan) D Popko (United States) A Ritschard	4	6	[8]
(Italy) Lorenzo Claverie (Bolivia) A Mendoza	6^{5}	4
(Italy) F Forti (Italy) G Zeppieri	7^{7}	6
WC	(Italy) M Arnaldi (Italy) F Maestrelli	6^{2}	6	[7]
(Argentina) F Díaz Acosta (Peru) A Merino	7^{7}	4	[10]
(Croatia) Z Babić (Germany) F Fallert	4	6	[6]
4	(Argentina) TM Etcheverry (Argentina) TA Tirante	6	3	[10]
(Turkey) T Altuna (Ukraine) V Sachko
PR	(Italy) A Motti (Italy) J Ocleppo	w/o
WC	(Italy) Alessio De Bernardis (Italy) F Passaro	6	6
2/WC	(Italy) F Cobolli (Italy) A Pellegrino	1	2

Quarterfinals
1	(Netherlands) M Vervoort (Bolivia) F Zeballos	5	7	[10]
(Netherlands) M Hermans (Netherlands) G Smits	7	5	[8]
3	(Italy) M Bortolotti (Colombia) C Rodríguez	3	4
(Italy) F Forti (Italy) G Zeppieri	6	6
(Argentina) F Díaz Acosta (Peru) A Merino	3
4	(Argentina) TM Etcheverry (Argentina) TA Tirante	2^{r}
PR	(Italy) A Motti (Italy) J Ocleppo	3	6	[10]
WC	(Italy) A De Bernardis (Italy) F Passaro	6	3	[5]

Semifinals
1	(Netherlands) M Vervoort (Bolivia) F Zeballos	2	6^{6}
(Italy) F Forti (Italy) G Zeppieri	6	7^{8}
(Argentina) F Díaz Acosta (Peru) A Merino	6	3	[10]
PR	(Italy) A Motti (Italy) J Ocleppo	1	6	[5]

Final
(Italy) F Forti (Italy) G Zeppieri	6	6
(Argentina) F Díaz Acosta (Peru) A Merino	3	2
