= 2013 Quito Challenger – Doubles =

Doubles
- 2013 Quito Challenger

Final
- Champions: (United States) Kevin King (Colombia) Juan Carlos Spir
- Runners-up: (Guatemala) Christopher Diaz-Figueroa (Colombia) Carlos Salamanca
- Score: 7–5, 6–7^{(9–11)}, [11–9]

Events
Singles	Doubles
- Quito Challenger

Juan Sebastián Cabal and Carlos Salamanca were the defending champions but Cabal decided not to participate.
Salamanca partnered with Christopher Diaz-Figueroa.

== Seeds ==
1. (Brazil) Joao Souza / (Colombia) Eduardo Struvay (quarterfinals, withdrew, Souza left shoulder)
2. (Argentina) Renzo Olivo / (Argentina) Marco Trungelliti (first round)
3. (El Salvador) Marcelo Arévalo / (Dominican Republic) Víctor Estrella Burgos (first round, Arevalo, late arrival)
4. (Colombia) Carlos Salamanca / (Guatemala) Christopher Diaz-Figueroa (final)

== Draw ==
Key

- Q = Qualifier
- WC = Wild card
- LL = Lucky loser
- Alt = Alternate
- ITF = ITF entry
- PR = Protected ranking
- SR = Special ranking
- SE = Special exempt
- JE = Junior exempt
- JR = Junior Accelerator Programme entrant
- CO = College Accelerator Programme entrant
- NG = Next Gen Accelerator Program entrant
- w/o = Walkover
- r = Retired
- d = Defaulted

=== Draw ===
First round
1	(Brazil) J Souza (Colombia) E Struvay	7^{8}	6^{5}	[10]
(Brazil) A Miele (Brazil) J Pereira	6^{6}	7^{7}	[5]
(Peru) M Echazú (Chile) G Rivera-Aránguiz	6^{5}	1
(United States) K King (Colombia) JC Spir	7^{7}	6
3	(El Salvador) M Arévalo (Dominican Republic) V Estrella Burgos
(Ecuador) E Gómez (Argentina) Sebastian Exequiel Pini	w/o
(Brazil) B Sant'Anna (Brazil) T Turini	6	5	[8]
(Ecuador) G Escobar (Brazil) Wilson Leite	3	6	[10]
(Peru) D Beretta (Colombia) M Quintero	6	6
(Barbados) D King (Australia) Chris Letcher	1	3
WC	(Cuba) Jorge del Valle (Ecuador) Julio Recalde	1	0
4	(Guatemala) C Diaz-Figueroa (Colombia) C Salamanca	6	6
(Bolivia) H Dellien (Argentina) JI Londero	6	6
WC	(United States) Sam Barnett (United States) C Buchanan	2	3
WC	(Venezuela) J de Armas (Ecuador) G Lapentti	7^{14}	7
2	(Argentina) R Olivo (Argentina) M Trungelliti	6^{12}	4

Quarterfinals
1	(Brazil) J Souza (Colombia) E Struvay
(United States) K King (Colombia) JC Spir	w/o
(Ecuador) E Gómez (Argentina) SE Pini	7^{8}	4	[10]
(Ecuador) G Escobar (Brazil) W Leite	6^{6}	6	[3]
(Peru) D Beretta (Colombia) M Quintero	3	7^{8}	[6]
4	(Guatemala) C Diaz-Figueroa (Colombia) C Salamanca	6	6^{8}	[10]
(Bolivia) H Dellien (Argentina) JI Londero	4	4
WC	(Venezuela) J de Armas (Ecuador) G Lapentti	6	6

Semifinals
(United States) K King (Colombia) JC Spir	6	7
(Ecuador) E Gómez (Argentina) SE Pini	3	5
4	(Guatemala) C Diaz-Figueroa (Colombia) C Salamanca	7^{7}	7
(Venezuela) J de Armas (Ecuador) G Lapentti	6^{5}	5

Final
(United States) K King (Colombia) JC Spir	7	6^{9}	[11]
4	(Guatemala) C Diaz-Figueroa (Colombia) C Salamanca	5	7^{11}	[9]
