= 2019 Internazionali di Tennis Città dell'Aquila – Singles =

Singles
- 2019 Internazionali di Tennis Città dell'Aquila

Final
- Champion: (Argentina) Andrea Collarini
- Runner-up: (Slovakia) Andrej Martin
- Score: 6–3, 6–1

Events
Singles	Doubles
- Internazionali di Tennis Città dell'Aquila

Facundo Bagnis was the defending champion but chose not to defend his title.

Andrea Collarini won the title after defeating Andrej Martin 6–3, 6–1 in the final.

== Seeds ==
All seeds receive a bye into the second round.

1. (Slovakia) Andrej Martin (final)
2. (Chile) Alejandro Tabilo (second round)
3. (Kazakhstan) Dmitry Popko (semifinals)
4. (Brazil) Thomaz Bellucci (second round)
5. (Russia) Pavel Kotov (third round)
6. (Croatia) Nino Serdarušić (second round)
7. (Russia) Aslan Karatsev (second round)
8. (Portugal) Frederico Ferreira Silva (third round)
9. (Australia) Aleksandar Vukic (quarterfinals)
10. (Italy) Raúl Brancaccio (second round)
11. (Argentina) Facundo Mena (third round)
12. (Italy) Gian Marco Moroni (second round)
13. (India) Sasikumar Mukund (second round)
14. (Argentina) Francisco Cerúndolo (quarterfinals)
15. (Switzerland) Marc-Andrea Hüsler (third round)
16. (Chile) Marcelo Tomás Barrios Vera (second round)

== Draw ==
Key

- Q = Qualifier
- WC = Wild card
- LL = Lucky loser
- Alt = Alternate
- ITF = ITF entry
- PR = Protected ranking
- SR = Special ranking
- SE = Special exempt
- JE = Junior exempt
- JR = Junior Accelerator Programme entrant
- CO = College Accelerator Programme entrant
- NG = Next Gen Accelerator Program entrant
- w/o = Walkover
- r = Retired
- d = Defaulted

=== Finals ===
Quarterfinals
1	(Slovakia) Andrej Martin	3	7^{7}	6
(Brazil) Guilherme Clezar	6	6^{2}	4
3/ITF	(Kazakhstan) Dmitry Popko	7^{10}	6
(Germany) Johannes Härteis	6^{8}	2
(Argentina) Andrea Collarini	2	6	7^{8}
14/ITF	(Argentina) Francisco Cerúndolo	6	2	6^{6}
9	(Australia) Aleksandar Vukic	3	1
(Spain) Carlos Taberner	6	6

Semifinals
1	(Slovakia) Andrej Martin	6	6
3/ITF	(Kazakhstan) Dmitry Popko	3	0
(Argentina) Andrea Collarini	4	7^{7}	7^{7}
(Spain) Carlos Taberner	6	6^{4}	6^{4}

Final
1	(Slovakia) Andrej Martin	3	1
(Argentina) Andrea Collarini	6	6

=== Top half ===
==== Section 1 ====
First round
(Italy) G Quinzi	6	6
(Colombia) A González	3	1
(Germany) S Fanselow	5	3
(Germany) P Torebko	7	6
(Netherlands) S Griekspoor	3	7^{10}	7^{8}
(Spain) C Gómez-Herrera	6	6^{8}	6^{6}
(Brazil) G Clezar	6	6
Alt	(Croatia) A Pavić	3	2

Second round
1	(Slovakia) A Martin	6	6
(Italy) G Quinzi	3	2
(Germany) P Torebko	3	6	6
16	(Chile) MT Barrios Vera	6	3	2
11	(Argentina) F Mena	7	6
(Netherlands) S Griekspoor	5	2
(Brazil) G Clezar	7	6
7	(Russia) A Karatsev	5	4

Third round
1	(Slovakia) A Martin	6	6
(Germany) P Torebko	2	4
11	(Argentina) F Mena	7^{7}	4	4
(Brazil) G Clezar	6^{3}	6	6

Quarterfinals
1	(Slovakia) A Martin	3	7^{7}	6
(Brazil) G Clezar	6	6^{2}	4

==== Section 2 ====
First round
(Uzbekistan) K Sultanov	6	7^{7}
(Italy) L Musetti	1	6^{3}
ITF	(France) Tom Jomby	2	3
(Estonia) J Zopp	6	6
ITF	(Argentina) JP Ficovich	6^{3}	7^{7}	6
(Uruguay) M Cuevas	7^{7}	6^{5}	1
(Italy) R Bonadio	4	4
(Germany) J Härteis	6	6

Second round
3/ITF	(Kazakhstan) D Popko	6	6
(Uzbekistan) K Sultanov	3	4
(Estonia) J Zopp	7	6
13	(India) S Mukund	5	4
12	(Italy) GM Moroni	4	6	4
ITF	(Argentina) JP Ficovich	6	4	6
(Germany) J Härteis	7^{7}	6
6	(Croatia) N Serdarušić	6^{5}	3

Third round
3/ITF	(Kazakhstan) D Popko	6	7^{7}
(Estonia) J Zopp	3	6^{5}
ITF	(Argentina) JP Ficovich	3	6^{6}
(Germany) J Härteis	6	7^{8}

Quarterfinals
3/ITF	(Kazakhstan) D Popko	7^{10}	6
(Germany) J Härteis	6^{8}	2

=== Bottom half ===
==== Section 3 ====
First round
ITF	(Australia) C O'Connell	4	2
WC	(Spain) C Alcaraz	6	6
(Argentina) A Collarini	6	6
Q	(Colombia) C Rodríguez	2	1
WC	(Italy) Luca Pancaldi	0	2
WC	(Italy) Gianluca Di Nicola	6	6
(Brazil) T Seyboth Wild	6	6
(Bosnia and Herzegovina) T Brkić	2	4

Second round
8	(Portugal) F Ferreira Silva	6	4	6
WC	(Spain) C Alcaraz	3	6	3
(Argentina) A Collarini	6	3	6
10	(Italy) R Brancaccio	3	6	3
14/ITF	(Argentina) F Cerúndolo	5	7^{7}	6
WC	(Italy) G Di Nicola	7	6^{4}	3
(Brazil) T Seyboth Wild	7	7^{7}
4	(Brazil) T Bellucci	5	6^{4}

Third round
8	(Portugal) F Ferreira Silva	4	6	3
(Argentina) A Collarini	6	3	6
14/ITF	(Argentina) F Cerúndolo	6	6
(Brazil) T Seyboth Wild	4	3

Quarterfinals
(Argentina) A Collarini	2	6	7^{8}
14/ITF	(Argentina) F Cerúndolo	6	2	6^{6}

==== Section 4 ====
First round
Q	(Italy) A Vavassori	7	3	7^{7}
(Netherlands) J Sels	5	6	6^{2}
(Ecuador) G Escobar	6	3	7^{7}
WC	(Italy) F Forti	3	6	6^{4}
(Russia) T Gabashvili	4	1
WC	(Hungary) M Valkusz	6	0^{r}
(Spain) C Taberner	7^{7}	7
(Spain) D Gimeno Traver	6^{5}	5

Second round
5	(Russia) P Kotov	6	7^{10}
Q	(Italy) A Vavassori	2	6^{8}
(Ecuador) G Escobar	3	4
9	(Australia) A Vukic	6	6
15	(Switzerland) M-A Hüsler	6	6
(Russia) T Gabashvili	1	3
(Spain) C Taberner	6	6^{7}	6
2	(Chile) A Tabilo	4	7^{9}	0

Third round
5	(Russia) P Kotov	4	3
9	(Australia) A Vukic	6	6
15	(Switzerland) M-A Hüsler	5	2
(Spain) C Taberner	7	6

Quarterfinals
9	(Australia) A Vukic	3	1
(Spain) C Taberner	6	6
