= Juan Sebastián Gómez =

Colombian tennis player (born 1992)

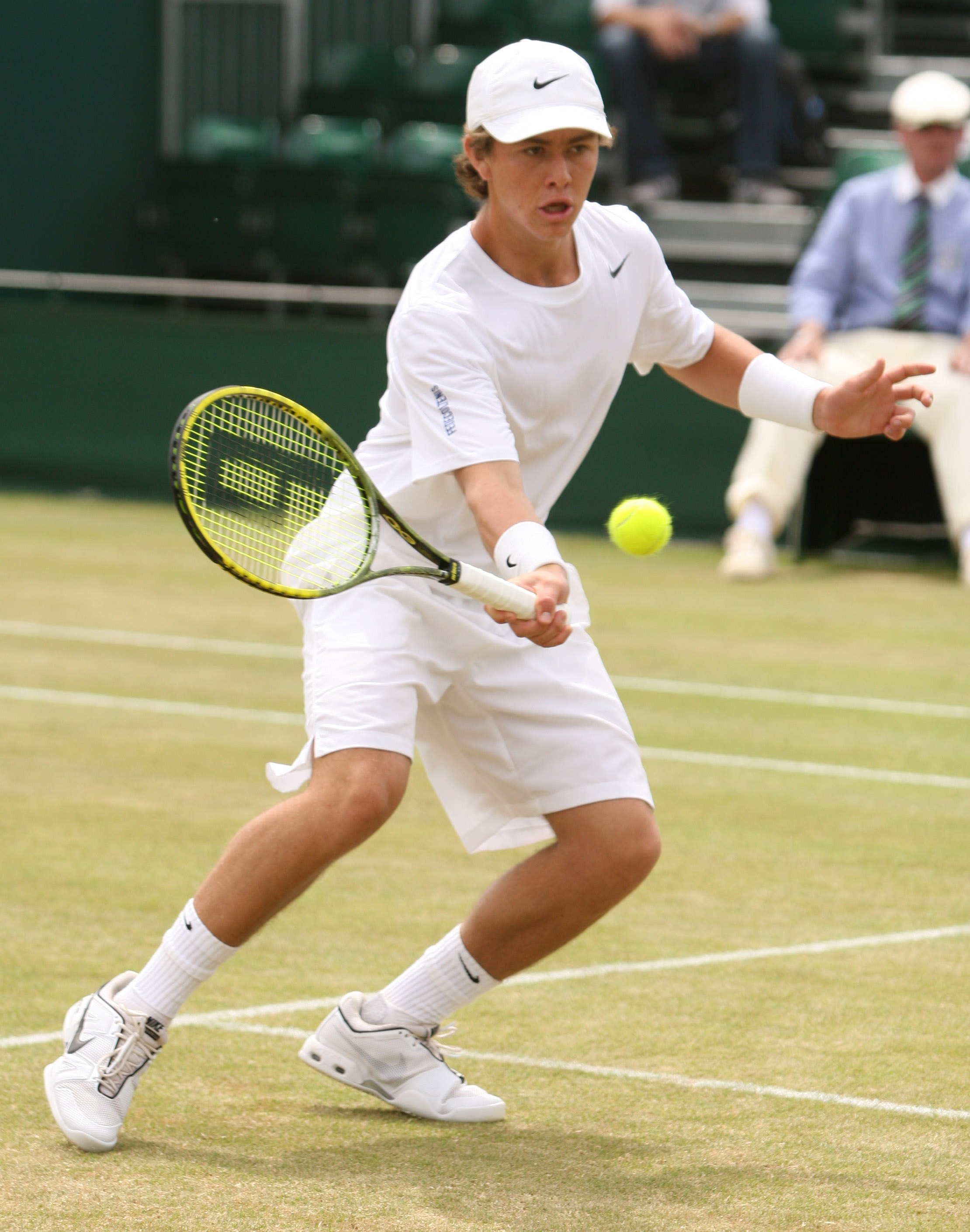
- Full name: Juan Sebastián Gómez Iregui
- Country (sports): Colombia
- Residence: Bogotá, Colombia
- Born: 5 March 1992 (age 34) Bogotá, Colombia
- Height: 1.78 m (5 ft 10 in)
- Turned pro: 2009
- Plays: Right-handed (two-handed backhand)
- Prize money: US $160,263

Singles
- Career record: 0–0
- Career titles: 0
- Highest ranking: No. 469 (5 October 2015)
- Current ranking: No. 578 (9 November 2026)

Doubles
- Career record: 1–1
- Career titles: 0
- Highest ranking: No. 306 (9 November 2015)
- Current ranking: No. 392 (9 November 2026)
Medal record
Representing Colombia
Men's tennis
Event	1st	2nd	3rd
Youth Olympic Games	1	0	0
CAC Games	0	2	1
Bolivarian Games	3	1	0
Total	4	3	1
Central American and Caribbean Games
Silver medal – second place	2026 Santo Domingo	Singles
Silver medal – second place	2026 Santo Domingo	Nations cup
Bronze medal – third place	2026 Santo Domingo	Doubles
Bolivarian Games
Gold medal – first place	2022 Valledupar	Singles
Gold medal – first place	2025 Lima-Ayacucho	Doubles
Gold medal – first place	2025 Lima-Ayacucho	Mixed doubles
Silver medal – second place	2022 Valledupar	Mixed doubles
Youth Olympic Games
Gold medal – first place	2010 Singapore	Singles
- Last updated on: 9 November 2026.

Juan Sebastián Gómez Iregui (Note: In this Spanish name, the first or paternal surname is Gómez and the second or maternal family name is Iregui.) (born 5 March 1992) is a Colombian professional tennis player. He has a career-high ATP singles ranking of No. 469, achieved on 5 October 2015 and a best doubles ranking of No. 306, reached on 9 November 2015. Gómez competes mainly on the ATP Challenger and ITF Tours.

== Summer Youth Olympics ==
=== Singles ===
Result	Year	Tournament	Surface	Opponent	Score
Gold	2010	2010 Youth Olympics, Singapore	Hard	(India) Yuki Bhambri	6–7 ^{(4–7)}, 7–6 ^{(7–4)}, 4–1 ^{(r)}

== ATP Challenger Tour finals ==
=== Singles: 1 (runner-up) ===
Legend ATP Challenger Tour (0–1)	Finals by surface Hard (0–0) Clay (0–1)

Result	W–L	Date	Tournament	Tier	Surface	Opponent	Score
Loss	0–1	Nov 2025	Challenger Seguros del Estado, Colombia	Challenger	Clay	(Colombia) Nicolás Mejía	4–6, 4–6

=== Doubles: 5 (3 title, 2 runner-up) ===
Legend ATP Challenger Tour (3–2)	Finals by surface Hard (0–0) Clay (3–2)

Result	W–L	Date	Tournament	Tier	Surface	Partner	Opponents	Score
Win	1–0	Oct 2011	Cerveza Club Quito Open, Ecuador	Challenger	Clay	(United States) Maciek Sykut	(Germany) Andre Begemann (South Africa) Izak van der Merwe	3–6, 7–5, [10–8]
Loss	1–1	Oct 2015	Open Pereira, Colombia	Challenger	Clay	(El Salvador) Marcelo Arévalo	(Argentina) Andrés Molteni (Brazil) Fernando Romboli	4–6, 6–7^{(10–12)}
Win	2–1	Jun 2023	Open Rionegro, Colombia	Challenger	Clay	(Colombia) Andrés Urrea	(Brazil) Orlando Luz (Ukraine) Oleg Prihodko	6–3, 7–6^{(12–10)}
Loss	2–2	Sep 2024	Cali Open, Colombia	Challenger	Clay	(Colombia) Johan Alexander Rodríguez	(Canada) Juan Carlos Aguilar (Peru) Conner Huertas del Pino	7–5, 3–6, [7–10]
Win	3–2	Mar 2026	Bucaramanga Challenger, Colombia	Challenger	Clay	(Chile) Matías Soto	(Ukraine) Vladyslav Orlov (Colombia) Adrià Soriano Barrera	6–2, 6–4

== ITF World Tennis Tour finals ==
=== Singles: 12 (3 title, 9 runner-ups) ===
Legend ITF Futures/WTT (3–9)	Finals by surface Hard (0–5) Clay (3–4)

Result	W–L	Date	Tournament	Tier	Surface	Opponent	Score
Loss	0-1	Oct 2011	Barquisimeto, Venezuela	Futures	Clay	(Argentina) Juan Pablo Ortiz	6–3, 5–7, 4–6
Loss	0-2	Jun 2014	Santa Margarida de Montbui, Spain	Futures	Clay	(Spain) Roberto Ortega Olmedo	5–4, 1–6
Loss	0-3	Jun 2014	Burgas, Bulgaria	Futures	Clay	(Bulgaria) Dimitar Kuzmanov	4–6, 3–6
Loss	0-4	Mar 2015	Managua, Nicaragua	Futures	Hard	(Mexico) Hans Hach Verdugo	4–6, 3–6
Loss	0-5	Nov 2015	Guatemala, Guatemala	Futures	Hard	(El Salvador) Marcelo Arevalo	2–6, 7–5, 3–6
Loss	0-6	Jun 2016	Cartagena, Colombia	Futures	Hard	(Colombia) Alejandro Gómez	4–6, 6–2, 6–7^{(4–7)}
Win	1-6	Nov 2016	Pereira, Colombia	Futures	Clay	(Peru) Juan Pablo Varillas	6–7^{(4–7)}, 6–1, 6–3
Loss	1-7	Aug 2019	M15 Santa Cruz de la Sierra, Bolivia	WTT	Clay	(Argentina) Juan Bautista Otegui	4–6, 7–5, 5–7
Win	2-7	Aug 2019	M15 La Paz, Bolivia	WTT	Clay	(Brazil) João Hinsching	7–6^{(7–2)}, 6–4
Loss	2-8	Oct 2021	M15 Cancún, México	WTT	Hard	(United States) Christian Langmo	3–6, 3–6
Win	3-8	Apr 2024	M25 Mosquera, Colombia	WTT	Clay	(United States) Harrison Adams	6–3, 6–4
Loss	3-9	Jul 2024	M15 Huamantla, México	WTT	Hard	(Dominican Republic) Peter Bertran	4–6, 3–6

=== Doubles: 8 (4 titles, 4 runner-ups) ===
Legend ITF Futures (4–4)	Finals by surface Hard (3–1) Clay (1–2) Carpet (0–1)

Result	W–L	Date	Tournament	Tier	Surface	Partner	Opponents	Score
Loss	0–1	Feb 2011	F2 Cartagena, Colombia	Futures	Hard	(Argentina) Cristián Benedetti	(Colombia) Felipe Rojas (Colombia) Pedro Pablo Ruiz	6–7 ^{(5–7)}, 6–2, [5–10]
Loss	0–2	Aug 2011	F3 Bogotá, Colombia	Futures	Clay	(United States) Peter Aarts	(United States) Maciek Sykut (United States) Denis Zivkovic	4–6, 3–6
Win	1–2	Aug 2013	F27 Ourense, Spain	Futures	Hard	(Spain) Gabriel Trujillo Soler	(Spain) Oriol Roco Batalla (Spain) Andoni Vivanco-Guzmán	2–6, 6–3, [10–7]
Win	2–2	Aug 2013	F29 Oviedo, Spain	Futures	Clay	(Spain) Gabriel Trujillo Soler	(Spain) José Checa Calvo (Spain) Andoni Vivanco-Guzmán	6–4, 6–3
Loss	2–3	Nov 2013	F40 Puerto de la Cruz, Spain	Futures	Carpet (i)	(Spain) Adam Sanjurjo Hermida	(Spain) Juan-Samuel Arauzo-Martinez (Spain) David Vega Hernández	1–6, 6–2, [6–10]
Win	3–3	Aug 2014	F28 Antalya, Turkey	Futures	Hard	(Spain) Gabriel Trujillo Soler	(Ukraine) Marat Deviatiarov (United States) Alexios Halebian	4–6, 7–6 ^{(7–2)}, [10–2]
Win	4–3	Mar 2015	F1 Managua, Nicaragua	Futures	Hard	(Chile) Julio Peralta	(South Africa) Keith-Patrick Crowley (Mexico) Hans Hach Verdugo	6–3, 6–3
Loss	4–4	May 2015	F3 III Copa Santiago Giraldo, Colombia	Futures	Clay	(Colombia) Felipe Escobar	(Brazil) João Menezes (Brazil) João Walendowsky	3–6, 7–5, [9–11]

== Notes ==
Awards
Preceded by (Sweden) Daniel Berta	ITF Junior World Champion; 2010	Succeeded by (Czech Republic) Jiří Veselý
