= Mario Vilella Martínez =

Spanish tennis player (born 1995)

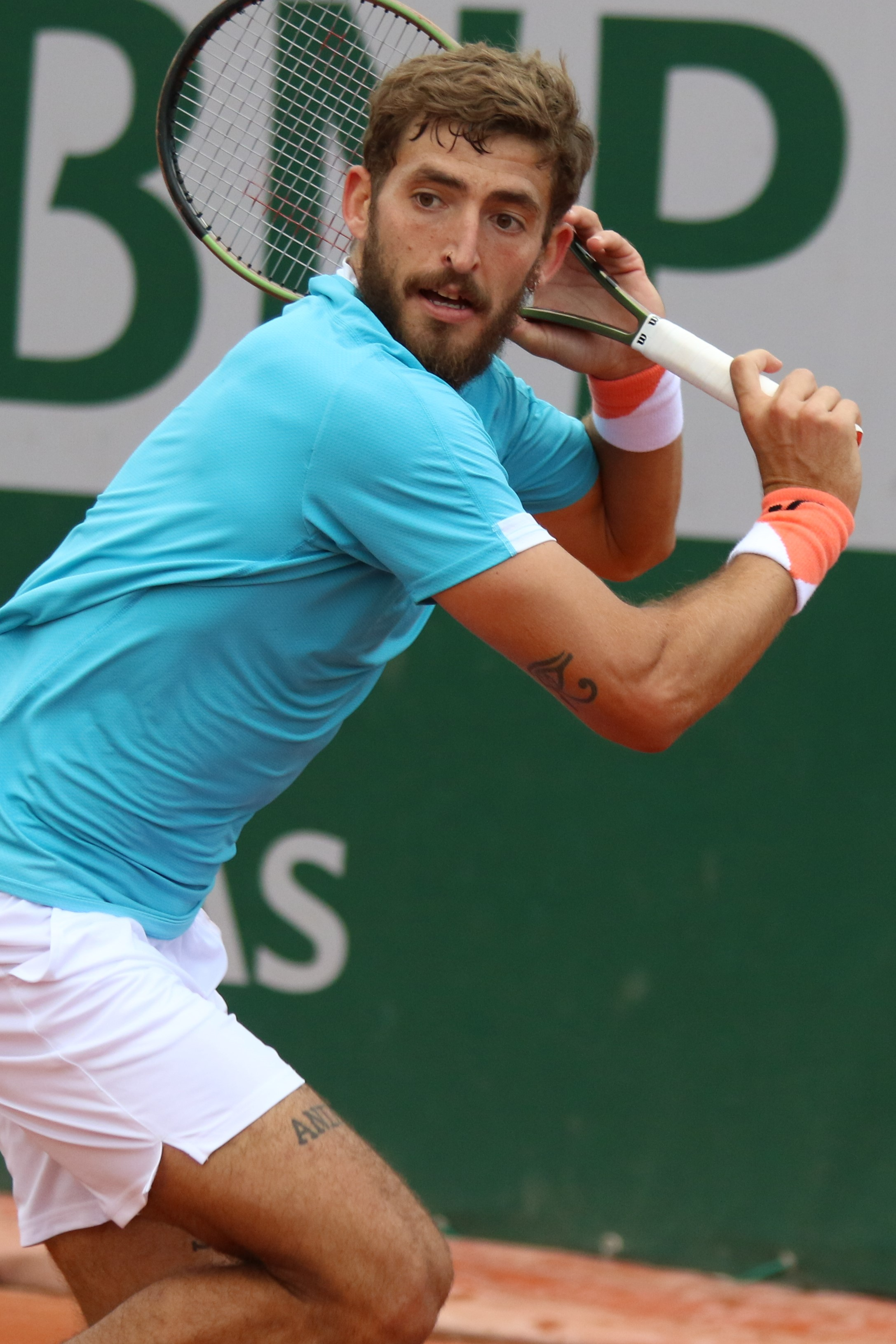
- Vilella Martínez at the 2022 French Open
- Country (sports): Spain
- Residence: Villena, Spain
- Born: 3 July 1995 (age 30) Elche, Spain
- Height: 1.78 m (5 ft 10 in)
- Retired: 2022
- Plays: Right-handed (two-handed backhand)
- Coach: Francisco Martínez Lidón
- Prize money: US$ 554,837

Singles
- Career record: 4–6
- Career titles: 0
- Highest ranking: No. 158 (19 July 2021)

Grand Slam singles results
- Australian Open: 1R (2020, 2021)
- French Open: 1R (2021)
- Wimbledon: Q2 (2022)
- US Open: Q3 (2019)

Doubles
- Career record: 1–2
- Career titles: 0
- Highest ranking: No. 286 (23 November 2020)
- Last updated on: 6 November 2023.

Mario Vilella Martínez (Spanish pronunciation: [ˈmaɾjo βiˈleʎa maɾˈtineθ]; (Note: In isolation, Vilella is pronounced [biˈleʎa].) born 3 July 1995) is a Spanish former tennis player. He has a career high ATP singles ranking of No. 158 achieved on 19 July 2021. He also has a career high ATP doubles ranking of No. 286 achieved on 23 November 2020.

== Professional career ==
=== 2015 ===
Vilella Martínez made his ATP main draw debut at the 2015 Valencia Open in the doubles draw partnering Eduardo Russi Assumpção.

=== 2020 ===
Vilella Martínez made his Grand Slam debut at the 2020 Australian Open as a qualifier where he lost to sixteenth seed Karen Khachanov.

=== 2021 ===
Vilella Martínez qualified for the 2021 Australian Open where he lost in the first round to first time qualifier Tomáš Macháč.

Vilella Martínez made his debut at the 2021 French Open as a qualifier where he lost to eleventh seed fellow Spaniard Roberto Bautista Agut. In July, he won his second Challenger title in Todi, Italy defeating Federico Gaio. As a result he reached a new career high ranking of No. 158 on 19 July 2021.

== Performance timelines ==
Key
W	F	SF	QF	#R	RR	Q#	P#	DNQ	A	Z#	PO	G	S	B	NMS	NTI	P	NH

(W) winner; (F) finalist; (SF) semifinalist; (QF) quarterfinalist; (#R) rounds 4, 3, 2, 1; (RR) round-robin stage; (Q#) qualification round; (P#) preliminary round; (DNQ) did not qualify; (A) absent; (Z#) Davis/Fed Cup Zonal Group (with number indication) or (PO) play-off; (G) gold, (S) silver or (B) bronze Olympic/Paralympic medal; (NMS) not a Masters tournament; (NTI) not a Tier I tournament; (P) postponed; (NH) not held; (SR) strike rate (events won / competed); (W–L) win–loss record.
To avoid confusion and double counting, these charts are updated at the conclusion of a tournament or when the player's participation has ended.

=== Singles ===
Current through the 2022 French Open.

Tournament	2019	2020	2021	2022	SR	W–L
Grand Slam tournaments
Australian Open	A	1R	1R	Q2	0 / 2	0–2
French Open	A	Q2	1R	Q1	0 / 1	0–1
Wimbledon	A	NH	Q1	Q2	0 / 0	0–0
US Open	Q3	A	Q1	A	0 / 0	0–0
Win–loss	0–0	0–1	0–2	0–0	0 / 3	0–3
ATP Masters 1000
Miami Open	A	NH	Q2	A	0 / 0	0–0
Win–loss	0–0	0–0	0–0	0–0	0 / 0	0–0
Career statistics
	2019	2020	2021	2022	Career	
Tournaments	0	1	5	0	6	
Overall win–loss	0-0	0-1	4–5	0–0	4–6	
Year-end ranking	197	191	177	1083	40%	

=== Doubles ===
Current after the 2022 Argentina Open.

Career statistics
	2015	2016	2017	2018	2019	2020	2021	2022	Career
Tournaments	1	0	0	0	0	0	0	1	2
Overall win–loss	0–1	0–0	0–0	0–0	0–0	0–0	0–0	1–1	1–2
Year-end ranking	1301	508	347	421	576	289	358	650	33%

== Challenger and Futures finals ==
=== Singles: 21 (11 titles, 10 runner-ups) ===
Legend (singles) ATP Challenger Tour (2–1) ITF Futures Tour (9–9)	Titles by surface Hard (2–0) Clay (9–10) Grass (0–0) Carpet (0–0)

Result	W–L	Date	Tournament	Tier	Surface	Opponent	Score
Win	1–0	Jan 2015	Tunisia F1, Port El Kantaoui	Futures	Hard	(France) Yannick Jankovits	2–6, 7–6^{(9-7)}, 6–4
Win	2–0	Feb 2015	Tunisia F3, Port El Kantaoui	Futures	Hard	(Spain) Jaime Pulgar-Garcia	6–7^{(4-7)}, 6–4, 7–6^{(7-2)}
Win	3–0	May 2015	Algeria F1, Oran	Futures	Clay	(Spain) David Pérez Sanz	7–6^{(7-4)}, 6–3
Loss	3–1	Aug 2015	Romania F14, Bucharest	Futures	Clay	(Spain) Carlos Boluda-Purkiss	4–6, 6–3, 4–6
Loss	3–2	Mar 2016	Morocco F1, Agadir	Futures	Clay	(Germany) Jeremy Jahn	1–6, 6–3, 2–6
Win	4–2	May 2016	Algeria F2, Algiers	Futures	Clay	(France) Grégoire Jacq	6–4, 6–2
Loss	4–3	Jun 2016	Spain F16, Huelva	Futures	Clay	(Portugal) João Domingues	4–6, 3–6
Win	5–3	Oct 2016	Spain F34, Melilla	Futures	Clay	(Spain) Ricardo Ojeda Lara	6–3, 6–3
Loss	5–4	Feb 2017	Spain F4, Paguera	Futures	Clay	(Spain) Jaume Munar	6–3, 4–6, 1–6
Win	6–4	Apr 2017	Kazakhstan F3, Shymkent	Futures	Clay	(Czech Republic) Zdeněk Kolář	6–4, 3–6, 6–0
Loss	6–5	Apr 2017	Kazakhstan F5, Shymkent	Futures	Clay	(Russia) Ivan Gakhov	3–6, 2–6
Loss	6–6	Jun 2017	Turkey F22, Istanbul	Futures	Clay	(Bolivia) Hugo Dellien	2–6, 6–1, 2–6
Loss	6–7	Dec 2017	Egypt F36, Cairo	Futures	Clay	(Spain) Enrique López Pérez	4–6, 3–6
Loss	6–8	Dec 2017	Egypt F37, Cairo	Futures	Clay	(Spain) Enrique López Pérez	4–6, 2–6
Win	7–8	Dec 2017	Egypt F38, Cairo	Futures	Clay	(Russia) Ronald Slobodchikov	6–4, 7–6^{(7-5)}
Win	8–8	Apr 2018	Spain F9, Madrid	Futures	Clay	(Argentina) Pedro Cachin	6–4, 6–0
Lose	8–9	May 2018	Samarkand, Uzbekistan	Challenger	Clay	(Italy) Luca Vanni	4–6, 4–6
Win	9–9	Jul 2018	Austria F1, Telfs	Futures	Clay	(Austria) Matthias Haim	6–4, 6–4
Lose	9–10	Jul 2018	Germany F7, Bad Schussenried	Futures	Clay	(Austria) Matthias Haim	3–6, 4–6
Win	10–10	Jul 2019	Prague, Czech Republic	Challenger	Clay	(Chinese Taipei) Chun-hsin Tseng	6–4, 6–2
Win	11–10	Jul 2021	Todi, Italy	Challenger	Clay	(Italy) Federico Gaio	7–6^{(7–3)}, 1–6, 6–3

=== Doubles: 15 (7 titles, 8 runner-ups) ===
Legend (doubles) ATP Challenger Tour (1–1) ITF Futures Tour (6–7)	Titles by surface Hard (3–2) Clay (4–6) Grass (0–0) Carpet (0–0)

Result	W–L	Date	Tournament	Tier	Surface	Partner	Opponents	Score
Loss	0–1	Jul 2015	Spain F22, Dénia	Futures	Clay	(Brazil) Eduardo Russi Assumpcao	(Russia) Ivan Gakhov (Russia) Mikhail Korovin	4–6, 2–6
Loss	0–2	Jun 2016	Spain F17, Martos	Futures	Hard	(Spain) Jaume Pla Malfeito	(France) Rémi Boutillier (France) Mick Lescure	7–6^{(7–3)}, 4–6, [5–10]
Loss	0–3	Oct 2016	Spain F34, Melilla	Futures	Clay	(Spain) Albert Alcaraz Ivorra	(Spain) Carlos Boluda-Purkiss (Spain) David Vega Hernández	7–6^{(11–9)}, 6–7^{(5–7)}, [6–10]
Win	1–3	Nov 2016	Spain F37, Cuevas Del Almanzora	Futures	Hard	(Spain) Jaume Pla Malfeito	(Spain) Roberto Ortega Olmedo (Spain) David Vega Hernández	7–6^{(7–4)}, 2–6, [10–5]
Win	2–3	Nov 2016	Spain F38, Cuevas Del Almanzora	Futures	Hard	(Spain) David Vega Hernández	(Spain) Jorge Hernando Ruano (Spain) Pablo Vivero Gonzalez	6–4, 7–6^{(7–5)}
Loss	2–4	Apr 2017	Kazakhstan F4, Shymkent	Futures	Clay	(Russia) Alexander Zhurbin	(Czech Republic) Zdeněk Kolář (Croatia) Nino Serdarušić	2–6, 2–6
Loss	2–5	May 2017	Sweden F2, Båstad	Futures	Clay	(Portugal) Fred Gil	(Sweden) Isak Arvidsson (Sweden) Fred Simonsson	3–6, 6–3, [8–10]
Win	3–5	Jun 2017	Turkey F23, Istanbul	Futures	Clay	(Australia) Bradley Mousley	(Bolivia) Hugo Dellien (Bolivia) Federico Zeballos	6–3, 6–3
Lose	3–6	Jun 2017	Turkey F24, Istanbul	Futures	Clay	(Germany) Marc Sieber	(Germany) Marvin Greven (Germany) Jannis Kahlke	1–2 ret.
Win	4–6	Dec 2017	Egypt F36, Cairo	Futures	Clay	(Brazil) Jordan Correia	(Poland) Karol Drzewiecki (Poland) Szymon Walków	7–6^{(13–11)}, 7–6^{(7–4)}
Lose	4–7	Feb 2018	Tunisia F4, Djerba	Futures	Hard	(Brazil) Eduardo Russi Assumpcao	(France) Jonathan Kanar (France) Laurent Lokoli	5–7, 0–6
Win	5–7	Feb 2018	Spain F5, Murcia	Futures	Clay	(Brazil) Eduardo Russi Assumpcao	(Italy) Dante Gennaro (Brazil) Bruno Santanna	3–6, 6–3, [10–8]
Win	6–7	Jul 2018	Austria F1, Telfs	Futures	Clay	(Italy) Marco Bortolotti	(Austria) Alexander Erler (Russia) Kirill Kivattsev	6–1, 3–6, [10–4]
Win	7–7	Jan 2020	Nouméa, New Caledonia	Challenger	Hard	(Italy) Andrea Pellegrino	(Switzerland) Luca Margaroli (Italy) Andrea Vavassori	7–6^{(7–1)}, 3–6, [12–10]
Loss	7–8	Sep 2021	Quito, Ecuador	Challenger	Clay	(Spain) Adrián Menéndez Maceiras	(Colombia) Alejandro Gómez (Argentina) Thiago Agustín Tirante	5-7, 7-6^{(7-5)}, [8-10]
