= Quito Challenger =

Tournament information
- Location: Quito; Ecuador
- Venue: Club Rancho San Francisco
- Category: ATP Challenger Series
- Surface: Clay / Outdoors
- Draw: 32S/32Q/16D
- Prize money: $63,000 (2026), $40,000+H

The Quito Challenger is a professional tennis event held annually in Quito, Ecuador in 1995-2014, in 2017, 2021, and it restarted in 2026. It is part of the ATP Challenger Tour and is played on outdoor clay courts.

== Past finals ==
=== Singles ===
| Year | Champion | Runner-up | Score |
|---|---|---|---|
| 2026 | (Brazil) Matheus Pucinelli de Almeida | (Argentina) Hernán Casanova | 5–7, 6–3, 6–2 |
| 2022–2025 | Not held | | |
| 2021 | (Argentina) Facundo Mena | (Chile) Gonzalo Lama | 6–4, 6–4 |
| 2018–2020 | Not held | | |
| 2017 | (Chile) Nicolás Jarry | (Austria) Gerald Melzer | 6–3, 6–2 |
| 2015–2016 | Not held | | |
| 2014 | (Argentina) Horacio Zeballos | (Chile) Nicolás Jarry | 6–4, 7–6^{(11–9)} |
| 2013 | (Dominican Republic) Víctor Estrella Burgos | (Argentina) Marco Trungelliti | 2-6, 6–4, 6–4 |
| 2012 | (Brazil) João Souza | (France) Guillaume Rufin | 6–2, 7–6^{(7–4)} |
| 2011 | (Argentina) Sebastián Decoud | (Spain) Daniel Muñoz-de la Nava | 6–3, 7–6^{(7–3)} |
| 2010 | (Ecuador) Giovanni Lapentti (4) | (Brazil) João Souza | 2–6, 6–3, 6–4 |
| 2009 | (Colombia) Carlos Salamanca | (Argentina) Sebastián Decoud | 7–6^{(7-4)}, 6–7^{(5-7)}, 6–4 |
| 2008 | (Ecuador) Giovanni Lapentti (3) | (Italy) Riccardo Ghedin | 6–4, 6–4 |
| 2007 | (Colombia) Santiago Giraldo | (Ecuador) Giovanni Lapentti | 7–6, 6–4 |
| 2006 | (Australia) Chris Guccione | (Argentina) Guillermo Cañas | 6–3, 7–6 |
| 2005 | (Brazil) Thiago Alves | (Brazil) Marcos Daniel | 1–6, 7–6, 6–2 |
| 2004 | (Ecuador) Giovanni Lapentti (2) | (Romania) Răzvan Sabău | 6–4, 6–3 |
| 2003 | (Ecuador) Giovanni Lapentti | (Brazil) Ricardo Mello | 6–3, 6–7, 6–3 |
| 2002 | (Belgium) Dick Norman | (Ecuador) Giovanni Lapentti | 6–4, 6–3 |
| 2001 | (United States) Hugo Armando (2) | (Ecuador) Luis Morejón | 6–7, 6–3, 7–6 |
| 2000 | (United States) Hugo Armando | (Argentina) Patricio Arquez | 6–3, 6–4 |
| 1999 | (Chile) Nicolás Massú (2) | (Ecuador) Luis Morejón | 6–2, 3–6, 6–3 |
| 1998 | (Chile) Nicolás Massú | (Mexico) Mariano Sánchez | 3–6, 6–3, 6–0 |
| 1997 | (Argentina) Mariano Puerta | (Paraguay) Ramón Delgado | 6–1, 7–5 |
| 1996 | (Ecuador) Pablo Campana | (Ecuador) Luis Morejón | 6–3, 6–2 |
| 1995 | (Ecuador) Luis Morejón | (France) Jérôme Golmard | 6–4, 5–6, ret. |

=== Doubles ===
| Year | Champion | Runner-up | Score |
|---|---|---|---|
| 2026 | (Chile) Matías Soto (Bolivia) Federico Zeballos | (Argentina) Hernán Casanova (Brazil) Pedro Sakamoto | 6–1, 6–4 |
| 2022–2025 | Not held | | |
| 2021 | (Colombia) Alejandro Gómez (Argentina) Thiago Agustín Tirante | (Spain) Adrián Menéndez Maceiras (Spain) Mario Vilella Martínez | 7–5, 6–7^{(5–7)}, [10–8] |
| 2018–2020 | Not held | | |
| 2017 | (El Salvador) Marcelo Arévalo (Mexico) Miguel Ángel Reyes-Varela | (Chile) Nicolás Jarry (Ecuador) Roberto Quiroz | 4–6, 6–4, [10–7] |
| 2015–2016 | Not held | | |
| 2014 | (Brazil) Marcelo Demoliner (Brazil) João Souza | (Peru) Duilio Beretta (Uruguay) Martín Cuevas | 6–4, 6–4 |
| 2013 | (United States) Kevin King (Colombia) Juan Carlos Spir | (Guatemala) Christopher Diaz-Figueroa (Colombia) Carlos Salamanca | 7–5, 6–7^{(9–11)}, [11–9] |
| 2012 | (Colombia) Juan Sebastián Cabal (Colombia) Carlos Salamanca | (Brazil) Marcelo Demoliner (Brazil) João Souza | 7–6^{(9–7)}, 7–6^{(7–4)} |
| 2011 | (Colombia) Juan Sebastián Gómez (United States) Maciek Sykut | (Germany) Andre Begemann (South Africa) Izak van der Merwe | 3–6, 7–5, [10–8] |
| 2010 | (Mexico) Daniel Garza (United States) Eric Nunez | (Colombia) Alejandro González (Colombia) Carlos Salamanca | 7–5, 6–4 |
| 2009 | (Mexico) Santiago González (2) (United States) Travis Rettenmaier | (Colombia) Michael Quintero (Spain) Fernando Vicente | 1–6, 6–3, [10–3] |
| 2008 | (United States) Hugo Armando (3) (Argentina) Leonardo Mayer | (Brazil) Ricardo Mello (Brazil) Caio Zampieri | 7–5, 6–2 |
| 2007 | (Argentina) Brian Dabul (Brazil) Marcos Daniel | (United States) Hugo Armando (Brazil) Ricardo Mello | 4–6, 7–5, [10–7] |
| 2006 | (Brazil) Rogério Dutra da Silva (Brazil) Marcelo Melo | (Uruguay) Pablo Cuevas (Argentina) Horacio Zeballos | 6–3, 6–4 |
| 2005 | (United States) Hugo Armando (2) (United States) Glenn Weiner | (Chile) Paul Capdeville (Chile) Adrián García | 6–3, 6–1 |
| 2004 | (Mexico) Santiago González (Mexico) Alejandro Hernández | (Poland) Łukasz Kubot (Germany) Frank Moser | 2–6, 6–2, 6–4 |
| 2003 | (Brazil) Ricardo Mello (Brazil) Alexandre Simoni | (United States) Hugo Armando (Brazil) Ricardo Schlachter | 6–3, 6–4 |
| 2002 | (United States) Hugo Armando (Venezuela) Kepler Orellana | (Brazil) Eduardo Bohrer (Brazil) Ronaldo Carvalho | 6–2, 6–4 |
| 2001 | (Brazil) Ricardo Schlachter (Netherlands) Rogier Wassen | (United States) Hugo Armando (Argentina) Diego del Río | 6–7, 6–4, 7–6 |
| 2000 | (Brazil) Francisco Costa (Georgia (country)) Irakli Labadze | (United States) Eric Nunez (Argentina) Martin Stringari | 6–2, 7–6 |
| 1999 | (Brazil) Paulo Taicher (Argentina) Andrés Zingman | (Mexico) Óscar Ortiz (Mexico) Marco Osorio | 7–5, 4–6, 7–5 |
| 1998 | (Brazil) Adriano Ferreira (Mexico) Óscar Ortiz | (Venezuela) Kepler Orellana (Venezuela) Jimy Szymanski | 6–3, 6–4 |
| 1997 | (Mexico) Bernardo Martínez (Mexico) Marco Osorio | (Paraguay) Ramón Delgado (Argentina) Martín García | 6–4, 6–4 |
| 1996 | (Ecuador) Pablo Campana (Ecuador) Nicolás Lapentti | (Italy) Nicola Bruno (Italy) Mosé Navarra | 6–4, 6–4 |
| 1995 | (United States) Ivan Baron (United States) Ian Williams | (Ecuador) Pablo Campana (Ecuador) Nicolás Lapentti | 6–3, 3–6, 6–3 |
