= Maciek Sykut =

American tennis player

- Country (sports): United States
- Born: June 21, 1986 (age 39) Warsaw, Poland
- Turned pro: 2009
- Plays: Right-handed (two-handed backhand)
- Prize money: US$33,855

Singles
- Career record: 0–0
- Career titles: 0
- Highest ranking: No. 578 (8 August 2011)

Doubles
- Career record: 0–0
- Career titles: 0
- Highest ranking: No. 145 (16 July 2012)

Maciek Sykut (Polish pronunciation: [ˈmatɕɛk ˈsɨkut]; born June 21, 1986) is an American professional tennis player. He competes mainly on the ATP Challenger Tour and ITF Futures, both in singles and doubles. He reached his highest ATP singles ranking of No. 578 achieved on 8 August 2011 and his highest ATP doubles ranking of No. 145 achieved on 16 July 2012.

== Career finals (2) ==
=== Doubles (2) ===
Legend
ATP Challengers (2)

Finals by surface
Hard (0–0)
Clay (2–0)
Grass (0–0)
Carpet (0–0)

Outcome	No.	Date	Tournament	Surface	Partnering	Opponents in the final	Score
Winner	1.	October 23, 2011	Quito, Ecuador	Clay	(Colombia) Juan Sebastián Gómez	(Germany) Andre Begemann (South Africa) Izak van der Merwe	3–6, 7–5, [10–8]
Winner	2.	March 31, 2012	Barranquilla, Colombia	Clay	(United States) Nicholas Monroe	(Uruguay) Marcel Felder (Germany) Frank Moser	2–6, 6–3, [10–5]
