= Eric Nunez =

American tennis player

- Country (sports): United States
- Residence: Aventura, Florida, U.S.
- Born: April 9, 1982 (age 43); St. Petersburg, Florida, U.S.
- Height: 6 ft 2 in (188 cm)
- Turned pro: 2000
- Plays: Right-handed (one-handed backhand)
- Prize money: $159,055

Singles
- Career record: 0–1
- Career titles: 0; 0 Challenger, 4 Futures
- Highest ranking: No. 199 (13 November 2006)

Grand Slam singles results
- Wimbledon: Q2 (2006)
- US Open: Q2 (2002, 2007)

Doubles
- Career record: 0–0
- Career titles: 0; 4 Challenger, 2 Futures
- Highest ranking: No. 178 (13 November 2006)
- Last updated on: 25 January 2022.

Eric Nunez (born April 9, 1982) is an American former professional tennis player. He won four doubles Challenger titles. He is married and has two children.

== ATP Challenger and ITF Futures finals ==
=== Singles: 7 (4–3) ===
Legend ATP Challenger (0–0) ITF Futures (4–3)	Finals by surface Hard (3–2) Clay (1–1) Grass (0–0) Carpet (0–0)

Result	W–L	Date	Tournament	Tier	Surface	Opponent	Score
Win	1-0	Oct 2001	USA F23, Jackson	Futures	Hard	(Argentina) Matías Boeker	6–4, 7–6^{(7–3)}
Win	2-0	Sep 2004	Ecuador F1, Guayaquil	Futures	Clay	(Ecuador) Carlos Avellán	6–3, 6–2
Win	2-1	Sep 2004	Ecuador F3, Guayaquil	Futures	Hard	(Argentina) Sebastián Decoud	3–6, 4–6
Win	3-1	Feb 2005	USA F4, Brownsville	Futures	Hard	(Czech Republic) Petr Kralert	7–6^{(7–3)}, 3–6, 7–5
Win	4-1	Mar 2005	USA F5, Harlingen	Futures	Hard	(United States) Ryan Newport	6–3, 7–6^{(7–2)}
Win	4-2	Jan 2006	USA F2, Kissimmee	Futures	Hard	(United States) Scoville Jenkins	6–7^{(2–7)}, 3–6
Win	4-3	Oct 2008	Brazil F24, São Leopoldo	Futures	Clay	(Brazil) Caio Zampieri	6–0, 6–7^{(7–9)}, 5–7

=== Doubles: 17 (6–11) ===
Legend ATP Challenger (4–8) ITF Futures (2–3)	Finals by surface Hard (5–6) Clay (1–5) Grass (0–0) Carpet (0–0)

Result	W–L	Date	Tournament	Tier	Surface	Partner	Opponents	Score
Loss	0–1	Nov 2000	Quito, Ecuador	Challenger	Clay	(Argentina) Martin Stringari	(Georgia (country)) Irakli Labadze (Brazil) Francisco Costa	2–6, 6–7^{(4–7)}
Loss	0–2	Sep 2001	Mexico F6, Guadalajara	Futures	Clay	(India) Vikrant Chadha	(Argentina) Matías Boeker (United States) Bo Hodge	2–6, 3–6
Win	1–2	Mar 2002	North Miami Beach, United States	Challenger	Hard	(United States) Graydon Oliver	(Czech Republic) Ota Fukárek (United States) Jim Thomas	3–6, 7–6^{(7–5)}, 7–5
Win	2–2	Feb 2004	USA F4, Brownsville	Futures	Hard	(United States) Tres Davis	(United States) Clancy Shields (United States) Luke Shields	6–3, 6–3
Loss	2–3	Apr 2004	Salinas, Ecuador	Challenger	Hard	(Venezuela) José de Armas	(Argentina) Federico Browne (Pakistan) Aisam Qureshi	3–6, 3–6
Loss	2–4	Aug 2004	Manta, Ecuador	Challenger	Hard	(Venezuela) Jimy Szymanski	(Brazil) Marcos Daniel (Mexico) Santiago González	6–3, 2–6, 6–7^{(5–7)}
Loss	2–5	Feb 2005	USA F4, Brownsville	Futures	Hard	(United States) Tres Davis	(United States) Lester Cook (Canada) Robert Steckley	walkover
Win	3–5	Aug 2006	Manta, Ecuador	Challenger	Hard	(Netherlands Antilles) Jean-Julien Rojer	(United States) Nicholas Monroe (Romania) Horia Tecău	6–3, 6–2
Loss	3–6	Oct 2006	Bogotá, Colombia	Challenger	Clay	(Netherlands Antilles) Jean-Julien Rojer	(Brazil) Marcelo Melo (Brazil) André Sá	4–6, 6–7^{(5–7)}
Loss	3–7	Nov 2006	Nashville, United States	Challenger	Hard	(South Africa) Rik de Voest	(United States) Scott Lipsky (United States) David Martin	7–6^{(9–7)}, 4–6, [6–10]
Loss	3–8	Jun 2007	Yuba City, United States	Challenger	Hard	(Netherlands Antilles) Jean-Julien Rojer	(Israel) Harel Levy (United States) Sam Warburg	4–6, 4–6
Loss	3–9	Jul 2007	Cuenca, Ecuador	Challenger	Clay	(Argentina) Brian Dabul	(Brazil) Bruno Soares (Brazil) Márcio Torres	6–7^{(4–7)}, 6–3, [9–11]
Loss	3–10	Aug 2007	Manta, Ecuador	Challenger	Hard	(United States) John Paul Fruttero	(Argentina) Eduardo Schwank (Argentina) Horacio Zeballos	4–6, 2–6
Win	4–10	Jun 2008	Venezuela F3, Valencia	Futures	Hard	(Venezuela) Yohny Romero	(Cuba) Sandor Martinez-Breijo (Venezuela) Román Recarte	6–4, 7–5
Win	5–10	Nov 2008	Puebla, Mexico	Challenger	Hard	(United States) Nicholas Monroe	(Mexico) Daniel Garza (Mexico) Santiago González	4–6, 6–3, [10–6]
Loss	5–11	Feb 2010	USA F4, Palm Coast	Futures	Clay	(Mexico) Daniel Garza	(United States) Benjamin Rogers (United States) Taylor Fogleman	walkover
Win	6–11	Oct 2010	Quito, Ecuador	Challenger	Clay	(Mexico) Daniel Garza	(Colombia) Alejandro González (Colombia) Carlos Salamanca	7–5, 6–4
