= Bernard Tomic career statistics =

Career statistics of professional Australian tennis player

Career finals
| Discipline | Type | Won | Lost | Total | WR^{1} |
|---|---|---|---|---|---|
| Singles | Grand Slam | – | – | – | – |
| Singles | ATP Finals | – | – | – | – |
| Singles | ATP Masters 1000 | – | – | – | – |
| Singles | Olympic Games | – | – | – | – |
| Singles | ATP 500 | – | 1 | 1 | 0.00 |
| Singles | ATP 250 | 4 | 1 | 5 | 0.80 |
| Singles | Total | 4 | 2 | 6 | 0.67 |
| Doubles | Grand Slam | – | – | – | – |
| Doubles | ATP Finals | – | – | – | – |
| Doubles | ATP Masters 1000 | — | — | — | – |
| Doubles | Olympic Games | – | – | – | – |
| Doubles | ATP 500 | – | 1 | 1 | 0.00 |
| Doubles | ATP 250 | – | – | – | – |
| Doubles | Total | – | 1 | 1 | 0.00 |
| Total | | 4 | 3 | 7 | 0.57 |
^{1)} WR = Winning Rate

This is a list of the main career statistics of professional Australian tennis player, Bernard Tomic. All statistics are according to the ATP Tour. To date, Tomic has reached one Grand Slam quarterfinal at the 2011 Wimbledon Championships and won four ATP singles titles including two consecutive titles at the Claro Open Colombia from 2014–2015. He was also a quarterfinalist at the 2015 BNP Paribas Open, the 2015 Shanghai Rolex Masters, the 2016 Western & Southern Open – Men's singles and part of the team which reached the semifinals of the 2015 Davis Cup. He also reached the fourth round of the Australian Open in 2012, 2015 and 2016. Tomic achieved a career high singles ranking of world No. 17 on 11 January 2016.

== Performance timelines ==
Key
| W | F | SF | QF | #R | RR | Q# | P# | DNQ | A | Z# | PO | G | S | B | NMS | NTI | P | NH |

(W) winner; (F) finalist; (SF) semifinalist; (QF) quarterfinalist; (#R) rounds 4, 3, 2, 1; (RR) round-robin stage; (Q#) qualification round; (P#) preliminary round; (DNQ) did not qualify; (A) absent; (Z#) Davis/Fed Cup Zonal Group (with number indication) or (PO) play-off; (G) gold, (S) silver or (B) bronze Olympic/Paralympic medal; (NMS) not a Masters tournament; (NTI) not a Tier I tournament; (P) postponed; (NH) not held; (SR) strike rate (events won / competed); (W–L) win–loss record.
To avoid confusion and double counting, these charts are updated at the conclusion of a tournament or when the player's participation has ended.

=== Singles ===
Current through the 2026 Shanghai Masters.

| Tournament | 2008 | 2009 | 2010 | 2011 | 2012 | 2013 | 2014 | 2015 | 2016 | 2017 | 2018 | 2019 | 2020 | 2021 | 2022 | 2023 | 2024 | 2025 | 2026 | SR | W–L | Win % |
|---|---|---|---|---|---|---|---|---|---|---|---|---|---|---|---|---|---|---|---|---|---|---|
Grand Slam tournaments
| Australian Open | Q2 | 2R | 2R | 3R | 4R | 3R | 1R | 4R | 4R | 3R | Q3 | 1R | Q1 | 2R | Q1 | A | A | Q1 | Q2 | 0 / 11 | 18–11 | 62% |
| French Open | A | 1R | A | 1R | 2R | 1R | 1R | 2R | 2R | 1R | 1R | 1R | A | Q1 | A | A | A | Q2 | Q2 | 0 / 10 | 3–10 | 23% |
| Wimbledon | A | Q3 | 1R | QF | 1R | 4R | 2R | 3R | 4R | 1R | 2R | 1R | NH | Q2 | A | A | A | A | Q2 | 0 / 10 | 14–10 | 58% |
| US Open | A | A | Q2 | 2R | 2R | 2R | 2R^{[a]} | 3R | 1R | 1R | Q1 | A | A | A | A | A | A | Q2 | Q1 | 0 / 7 | 6–6 | 50% |
| Win–loss | 0–0 | 1–2 | 1–2 | 7–4 | 5–4 | 6–4 | 2–3 | 8–4 | 7–4 | 2–4 | 1–2 | 0–3 | 0–0 | 1–1 | 0–0 | 0–0 | 0–0 | 0–0 | 0–0 | 0 / 38 | 41–37 | 53% |
National representation
| Summer Olympics | A | not held | | | 1R | not held | | | A | not held | | | | A | not held | | A | not held | | 0 / 1 | 0–1 | 0% |
| Davis Cup | A | A | PO | PO | Z1 | PO | A | SF | 1R | A | A | A | A | A | A | A | A | A | A | 0 / 2 | 17–4 | 81% |
ATP Masters 1000
| Indian Wells Open | A | A | A | 2R | 1R | 2R | A | QF^{[b]} | 3R | 1R | A | Q1 | NH | A | A | A | A | A | A | 0 / 6 | 6–5 | 54% |
| Miami Open | A | A | A | 1R | 2R | 2R | 1R | 3R | A | A | A | 2R | NH | A | A | A | A | A | A | 0 / 6 | 4–6 | 40% |
| Monte-Carlo Masters | A | A | 1R | Q2 | 2R | 1R | A | 2R | A | 1R | A | Q1 | NH | Q2 | A | A | A | A | A | 0 / 5 | 2–5 | 29% |
| Madrid Open | A | A | A | A | 1R | 1R | Q2 | 1R | 1R | 1R | A | Q1 | NH | A | A | A | A | A | A | 0 / 5 | 0–5 | 0% |
| Italian Open | A | A | A | A | 2R | A | Q1 | 1R | 1R | 1R | A | Q2 | A | A | A | A | A | A | A | 0 / 4 | 1–4 | 20% |
| Canadian Open | A | A | A | 2R | 2R | 1R | 1R | 3R | 3R | A | Q1 | 1R | NH | A | A | A | A | A | A | 0 / 7 | 6–7 | 46% |
| Cincinnati Open | A | A | A | Q1 | 3R | Q1 | 1R | 2R | QF | A | A | Q1 | A | A | A | A | A | A | A | 0 / 4 | 6–4 | 60% |
| Shanghai Masters | NH | A | A | 3R | 1R | 1R | 1R | QF | 1R | A | A | Q1 | NH | | | A | A | Q1 | 1R | 0 / 7 | 5–7 | 42% |
| Paris Masters | A | A | A | Q1 | A | 1R | Q2 | 2R | A | A | A | A | A | A | A | A | A | A | | 0 / 2 | 1–2 | 33% |
| Win–loss | 0–0 | 0–0 | 0–1 | 4–4 | 6–8 | 2–7 | 0–4 | 12–8 | 6–6 | 0–4 | 0–0 | 1–2 | 0–0 | 0–0 | 0–0 | 0–0 | 0–0 | 0–0 | 0–1 | 0 / 46 | 31–45 | 41% |
Career statistics
| | 2008 | 2009 | 2010 | 2011 | 2012 | 2013 | 2014 | 2015 | 2016 | 2017 | 2018 | 2019 | 2020 | 2021 | 2022 | 2023 | 2024 | 2025 | 2026 | Career | | |
| Tournaments | 0 | 3 | 6 | 14 | 26 | 23 | 17 | 28 | 23 | 20 | 8 | 15 | 1 | 1 | 0 | 0 | 0 | 2 | 2 | Career total: 189 | | |
| Titles | 0 | 0 | 0 | 0 | 0 | 1 | 1 | 1 | 0 | 0 | 1 | 0 | 0 | 0 | 0 | 0 | 0 | 0 | 0 | Career total: 4 | | |
| Finals | 0 | 0 | 0 | 0 | 0 | 1 | 2 | 1 | 1 | 0 | 1 | 0 | 0 | 0 | 0 | 0 | 0 | 0 | 0 | Career total: 6 | | |
| Hard win–loss | 0–0 | 1–2 | 3–3 | 11–12 | 17–13 | 15–15 | 14–10 | 34–17 | 19–14 | 3–10 | 5–2 | 4–7 | 0–1 | 1–1 | 0–0 | 0–0 | 0–0 | 0–1 | 2–2 | 4 / 115 | 129–110 | 54% |
| Clay win–loss | 0–0 | 0–1 | 0–1 | 0–1 | 8–10 | 5–4 | 0–2 | 2–6 | 2–6 | 3–5 | 0–2 | 1–5 | 0–0 | 0–0 | 0–0 | 0–0 | 0–0 | 0–0 | 0–0 | 0 / 43 | 21–43 | 33% |
| Grass win–loss | 0–0 | 0–0 | 1–2 | 5–2 | 1–4 | 5–3 | 3–3 | 4–4 | 9–4 | 4–4 | 4–3 | 2–3 | 0–0 | 0–0 | 0–0 | 0–0 | 0–0 | 1–1 | 0–0 | 0 / 31 | 39–33 | 54% |
| Overall win–loss | 0–0 | 1–3 | 4–6 | 16–15 | 26–27 | 25–22 | 17–15 | 40–27 | 30–24 | 10–19 | 9–7 | 7–15 | 0–1 | 1–1 | 0–0 | 0–0 | 0–0 | 1–2 | 2–2 | 4 / 189 | 189–186 | 50% |
| Win % | – | 25% | 40% | 52% | 49% | 53% | 53% | 62% | 58% | 34% | 56% | 32% | 0% | 50% | – | – | – | 33% | 50% | Career total: 50% | | |
| Year-end ranking | 763 | 286 | 208 | 42 | 52 | 51 | 56 | 18 | 26 | 140 | 83 | 185 | 226 | 260 | 462 | 289 | 213 | 192 | | $6,835,360 | | |

Notes
^{a} 2014 US Open counts as 1 win, 0 losses. David Ferrer received a walkover in the second round, after Tomic withdrew.
^{b} 2015 Indian Wells Masters counts as 3 wins, 0 losses. Novak Djokovic received a walkover in the quarterfinals after Tomic withdrew with a back injury.

=== Doubles ===
| Tournament | 2010 | 2011 | 2012 | 2013 | 2014 | 2015 | 2016 | 2017 | SR | W–L |
|---|---|---|---|---|---|---|---|---|---|---|
Grand Slam tournaments
| Australian Open | 1R | A | A | A | A | A | A | A | 0 / 1 | 0–1 |
| French Open | A | A | 1R | A | A | A | 1R | 1R | 0 / 3 | 0–3 |
| Wimbledon | A | A | A | 1R | A | A | A | A | 0 / 1 | 0–1 |
| US Open | A | 1R | 2R | 2R | 1R | A | A | A | 0 / 4 | 2–4 |
| Win–loss | 0–1 | 0–1 | 1–2 | 1–2 | 0–1 | 0–0 | 0–1 | 0–1 | 0 / 9 | 2–9 |
Career statistics
| Titles | 0 | 0 | 0 | 0 | 0 | 0 | 0 | 0 | 0 | |
| Finals | 0 | 0 | 0 | 0 | 0 | 0 | 1 | 0 | 1 | |
| Year-end ranking | 877 | 755 | 562 | 154 | – | 304 | 145 | 285 | | |

== ATP Tour finals ==
=== Singles: 6 (4 titles, 2 runner-ups) ===
| Legend Grand Slam (0–0) ATP Finals (0–0) ATP Masters 1000 (0–0) ATP 500 (0–1) ATP 250 (4–1) | Finals by surface Hard (4–2) Clay (0–0) Grass (0–0) | Finals by setting Outdoor (4–2) Indoor (0–0) |

| Result | W–L | Date | Tournament | Tier | Surface | Opponent | Score |
|---|---|---|---|---|---|---|---|
| Win | 1–0 | Jan 2013 | Sydney International, Australia | ATP 250 | Hard | (South Africa) Kevin Anderson | 6–3, 6–7^{(2–7)}, 6–3 |
| Loss | 1–1 | Jan 2014 | Sydney International, Australia | ATP 250 | Hard | (Argentina) Juan Martín del Potro | 3–6, 1–6 |
| Win | 2–1 | Jul 2014 | Colombia Open, Colombia | ATP 250 | Hard | (Croatia) Ivo Karlović | 7–6^{(7–5)}, 3–6, 7–6^{(7–4)} |
| Win | 3–1 | Jul 2015 | Colombia Open, Colombia (2) | ATP 250 | Hard | (France) Adrian Mannarino | 6–1, 3–6, 6–2 |
| Loss | 3–2 | Feb 2016 | Mexican Open, Mexico | ATP 500 | Hard | (Austria) Dominic Thiem | 6–7^{(6–8)}, 6–4, 3–6 |
| Win | 4–2 | Sep 2018 | Chengdu Open, China | ATP 250 | Hard | (Italy) Fabio Fognini | 6–1, 3–6, 7–6^{(9–7)} |

=== Doubles: 1 (1 runner-up) ===
| Legend Grand Slam (0–0) ATP Finals (0–0) ATP Masters 1000 (0–0) ATP 500 (0–1) ATP 250 (0–0) | Finals by surface Hard (0–1) Clay (0–0) Grass (0–0) | Finals by setting Outdoor (0–1) Indoor (0–0) |

| Result | W–L | Date | Tournament | Tier | Surface | Partner | Opponents | Score |
|---|---|---|---|---|---|---|---|---|
| Loss | 0–1 | Oct 2016 | China Open, China | ATP 500 | Hard | (United States) Jack Sock | (Spain) Pablo Carreño Busta (Spain) Rafael Nadal | 6–7^{(6–8)}, 6–2, [8–10] |

== ATP Challenger Tour finals ==
=== Singles: 9 (4 titles, 5 runner-ups) ===
| Result | W–L | Date | Tournament | Surface | Opponent | Score |
|---|---|---|---|---|---|---|
| Win | 1–0 | Mar 2009 | Melbourne, Australia | Hard | (Australia) Marinko Matosevic | 5–7, 6–4, 6–3 |
| Win | 2–0 | Feb 2010 | Burnie, Australia | Hard | (Australia) Greg Jones | 6–4, 6–2 |
| Loss | 2–1 | Feb 2011 | Caloundra, Australia | Hard | (Slovenia) Grega Žemlja | 6–7^{(4–7)}, 3–6 |
| Loss | 2–2 | May 2018 | Aix-en-Provence, France | Clay | (Australia) John Millman | 1–6, 2–6 |
| Win | 3–2 | Sep 2018 | Manacor, Spain | Hard | (Germany) Matthias Bachinger | 4–6, 6–3, 7–6^{(7–3)} |
| Loss | 3–3 | Oct 2024 | Fairfield, USA | Hard | (United States) Learner Tien | 0–6, 1–6 |
| Loss | 3–4 | Aug 2025 | Lexington, USA | Hard | (United States) Zachary Svajda | 6–2, 3–6, 2–6 |
| Loss | 3–5 | Aug 2025 | Barranquilla, Colombia | Hard | (United Kingdom) Arthur Fery | walkover |
| Win | 4–5 | Jul 2026 | Lincoln, USA | Hard | (Estonia) Mark Lajal | 4–6, 7–6^{(7–4)}, 7–6^{(7–3)} |

== ITF Futures/World Tennis Tour finals ==
=== Singles: 10 (5 titles, 5 runner-ups) ===
| Result | W–L | Date | Tournament | Surface | Opponent | Score |
|---|---|---|---|---|---|---|
| Loss | 0–1 | Aug 2008 | Indonesia F2, Balikpapan | Hard | (Japan) Yūichi Sugita | 3–6, 7–6^{(8–6)}, 3–6 |
| Win | 1–1 | Sep 2022 | M15 Cancún, Mexico | Hard | (United States) Tristan McCormick | 7–6^{(7–4)}, 6–3 |
| Win | 2–1 | Oct 2022 | M15 Cancún, Mexico | Hard | (Moldova) Alexander Cozbinov | 7–6^{(7–5)}, 6–3 |
| Loss | 2–2 | Oct 2022 | M25 Harlingen, USA | Hard | (United States) Martin Damm Jr. | 7–6^{(7–4)}, 3–6, 4–6 |
| Win | 3–2 | Nov 2022 | M15 Santo Domingo, Dominican Rep. | Hard | (Barbados) Darian King | 6–3, 4–6, 6–3 |
| Loss | 3–3 | Jan 2023 | M15 Doha, Qatar | Hard | (Estonia) Kristjan Tamm | 4–6, 6–7^{(5–7)} |
| Win | 4–3 | Oct 2023 | M15 Las Vegas, USA | Hard | (United States) Thai-Son Kwiatkowski | 6–1, 4–6, 6–2 |
| Win | 5–3 | Jan 2024 | M25 Chennai, India | Hard | (India) Mukund Sasikumar | 6–4, 7–6^{(7–3)} |
| Loss | 5–4 | May 2024 | M25 Xalapa, Mexico | Hard | (Mexico) Rodrigo Pacheco Méndez | 7–6^{(7–1)}, 5–7, 4–6 |
| Loss | 5–5 | Jun 2024 | M25 Tulsa, USA | Hard | (United States) Eliot Spizzirri | 4–6, 6–3, 6–7^{(3–7)} |

== Junior Grand Slam finals ==
=== Singles: 2 (2 titles) ===
| Result | Year | Tournament | Surface | Opponent | Score |
|---|---|---|---|---|---|
| Win | 2008 | Australian Open | Hard | (Chinese Taipei) Tsung-Hua Yang | 4–6, 7–6^{(7–5)}, 6–0 |
| Win | 2009 | US Open | Hard | (United States) Chase Buchanan | 6–1, 6–3 |

=== Doubles: 1 (1 runner-up) ===
| Result | Year | Tournament | Surface | Partner | Opponents | Score |
|---|---|---|---|---|---|---|
| Loss | 2008 | Wimbledon | Grass | (Australia) Matt Reid | (Chinese Taipei) Cheng-Peng Hsieh (Chinese Taipei) Tsung-Hua Yang | 4–6, 6–2, [10–12] |

== Top-10 wins ==
- Tomic has an 8–40 (.167) record against players who were, at the time the match was played, ranked in the top 10.

| Season | 2008–2010 | 2011 | 2012 | 2013 | 2014 | 2015 | 2016 | 2017–2023 | 2024 | Total |
| Wins | 0 | 2 | 0 | 1 | 0 | 3 | 2 | 0 | 0 | 8 |

| # | Player | Rank | Event | Surface | Rd | Score | Rank |
|---|---|---|---|---|---|---|---|
2011
| 1. | (Sweden) Robin Söderling | 5 | Wimbledon, United Kingdom | Grass | 3R | 6–1, 6–4, 7–5 | 158 |
| 2. | (United States) Mardy Fish | 9 | Shanghai, China | Hard | 2R | 4–6, 6–1, 6–4 | 49 |
2013
| 3. | (France) Richard Gasquet | 9 | Wimbledon, United Kingdom | Grass | 3R | 7–6^{(9–7)}, 5–7, 7–5, 7–6^{(7–5)} | 59 |
2015
| 4. | (Spain) David Ferrer | 8 | Indian Wells, United States | Hard | 3R | 7–5, 6–4 | 35 |
| 5. | (Croatia) Marin Čilić | 8 | Montreal, Canada | Hard | 2R | 6–3, 6–4 | 26 |
| 6. | (Spain) David Ferrer | 8 | Shanghai, China | Hard | 2R | 6–4, 6–2 | 20 |
2016
| 7. | (Japan) Kei Nishikori | 8 | Brisbane, Australia | Hard | QF | 6–3, 1–6, 6–3 | 18 |
| 8. | (Japan) Kei Nishikori | 7 | Cincinnati, United States | Hard | 3R | 7–6^{(7–1)}, 7–6^{(7–5)} | 21 |

== National representation ==
=== Davis Cup (17–4) ===
| Round | Date | Opponent | Tie score | Venue | Surface | Match | Opponent | Rubber score |
2010 Davis Cup Asia/Oceania Zone Group I
| 1R | Mar 2010 | Chinese Taipei | 5–0 | Melbourne | Hard | Singles 1 | Tsung-Hua Yang | 6–2, 6–1, 6–1 |
| 1R | Mar 2010 | Chinese Taipei | 5–0 | Melbourne | Hard | Singles 5 | Lee Hsin-han | 6–7^{(4–7)}, 6–0, 6–3 |
2011 Davis Cup Asia/Oceania Zone Group I / World Group play-offs
| 2R | Jul 2011 | China | 3–1 | Beijing | Hard (i) | Singles 2 | Ze Zhang | 6–3, 5–7, 6–4, 6–4 |
| PO | Sep 2011 | Switzerland | 2–3 | Sydney | Grass | Singles 1 | Stanislas Wawrinka | 4–6, 6–4, 6–3, 6–3 |
| PO | Sep 2011 | Switzerland | 2–3 | Sydney | Grass | Singles 4 | Roger Federer | 2–6, 5–7, 6–3, 3–6 |
2012 Davis Cup Asia/Oceania Zone Group I / World Group play-offs
| 1R | Feb 2012 | China | 5–0 | Geelong | Grass | Singles 2 | Di Wu | 6–4, 7–6^{(7–3)}, 6–3 |
| 2R | Apr 2012 | South Korea | 5–0 | Brisbane | Hard | Singles 1 | Min Hyeok Cho | 7–5, 6–3, 6–3 |
| 2R | Apr 2012 | South Korea | 5–0 | Brisbane | Hard | Singles 4 | Jeong Suk-young | 6–2, 6–1 |
| PO | Sep 2012 | Germany | 2–3 | Hamburg | Clay | Singles 1 | Cedrik-Marcel Stebe | 2–6, 6–3, 6–4, 7–6^{(7–4)} |
| PO | Sep 2012 | Germany | 2–3 | Hamburg | Clay | Singles 4 | Florian Mayer | 4–6, 2–6, 3–6 |
2013 Davis Cup Asia/Oceania Zone Group I / World Group play-offs
| 2R | Apr 2013 | Uzbekistan | 3–1 | Namangan | Clay (i) | Singles 1 | Farrukh Dustov | 7–6^{(8–6)}, 6–4, 6–4 |
| 2R | Apr 2013 | Uzbekistan | 3–1 | Namangan | Clay (i) | Singles 4 | Denis Istomin | 4–6, 6–2, 6–2, 6–3 |
| PO | Sep 2013 | Poland | 4–1 | Warsaw | Clay (i) | Singles 2 | Michał Przysiężny | 7–5, 7–6^{(7–1)}, 6–4 |
| PO | Sep 2013 | Poland | 4–1 | Warsaw | Clay (i) | Singles 4 | Łukasz Kubot | 6–4, 7–6^{(7–5)}, 6–3 |
2015 Davis Cup World Group
| 1R | Mar 2015 | Czech Republic | 3–2 | Ostrava | Hard (i) | Singles 2 | Jiří Veselý | 6–4, 6–3, 7–6^{(7–5)} |
| 1R | Mar 2015 | Czech Republic | 3–2 | Ostrava | Hard (i) | Singles 4 | Lukáš Rosol | 7–6^{(7–4)}, 6–3, 7–6^{(7–5)} |
| SF | Sep 2015 | Great Britain | 2–3 | Glasgow | Hard (i) | Singles 2 | Dan Evans | 6–3, 7–6^{(7–2)}, 6–7^{(4–7)}, 6–4 |
| SF | Sep 2015 | Great Britain | 2–3 | Glasgow | Hard (i) | Singles 4 | Andy Murray | 5–7, 3–6, 2–6 |
2016 Davis Cup World Group / World Group play-offs
| 1R | Mar 2016 | United States | 2–3 | Melbourne | Grass | Singles 2 | Jack Sock | 7–6^{(7–2)}, 6–3, 3–6, 6–4 |
| 1R | Mar 2016 | United States | 2–3 | Melbourne | Grass | Singles 4 | John Isner | 4–6, 4–6, 7–5, 6–7^{(4–7)} |
| PO | Sep 2016 | Slovakia | 3–0 | Sydney | Grass | Singles 2 | Jozef Kovalík | 7–6^{(7–5)}, 6–4, 6–4 |
