= 2014 Claro Open Colombia – Singles =

Singles
- 2014 Claro Open Colombia

Final
- Champion: (Australia) Bernard Tomic
- Runner-up: (Croatia) Ivo Karlović
- Score: 7–6^{(7–5)}, 3–6, 7–6^{(7–4)}

Events
Singles	Doubles
← 2013 ·	Claro Open Colombia	· 2015 →

Ivo Karlović was the defending champion, but lost in the final to Bernard Tomic, 6–7^{(5–7)}, 6–3, 6–7^{(4–7)}.

== Seeds ==
The top four seeds receive a bye into the second round.

1. (France) Richard Gasquet (quarterfinals)
2. (Croatia) Ivo Karlović (final)
3. (Canada) Vasek Pospisil (quarterfinals)
4. (Czech Republic) Radek Štěpánek (semifinals)
5. (Colombia) Alejandro Falla (second round)
6. (Colombia) Alejandro González (quarterfinals)
7. (Australia) Matthew Ebden (first round, retired)
8. (Dominican Republic) Víctor Estrella Burgos (semifinals)

== Draw ==
=== Key ===
- Q = Qualifier
- WC = Wild card
- LL = Lucky loser
- Alt = Alternate
- SE = Special exempt
- PR = Protected ranking
- ITF = ITF entry
- JE = Junior exempt
- w/o = Walkover
- r = Retired
- d = Defaulted
- SR = Special ranking

=== Finals ===
Semifinals
8	(Dominican Republic) Víctor Estrella Burgos	6^{2}	7^{7}	6^{5}
WC	(Australia) Bernard Tomic	7^{7}	6^{5}	7^{7}
4	(Czech Republic) Radek Štěpánek	4	6	4
2	(Croatia) Ivo Karlović	6	3	6

Final
WC	(Australia) Bernard Tomic	7^{7}	3	7^{7}
2	(Croatia) Ivo Karlović	6^{5}	6	6^{4}

=== Top half ===
First round
WC	(Colombia) JS Cabal	3	7^{12}	6^{4}
(Australia) S Groth	6	6^{10}	7^{7}
Q	(Colombia) N Barrientos	6	4	3
(Canada) P Polansky	3	6	6
Q	(Argentina) JI Londero	5	3
8	(Dominican Republic) V Estrella Burgos	7	6
(United States) A Kuznetsov	6	7^{7}
(France) A Mannarino	4	6^{3}
WC	(Australia) B Tomic	6	6
(Uzbekistan) F Dustov	3	3
(Japan) T Ito	3	2
5	(Colombia) A Falla	6	6

Second round
1	(France) R Gasquet	7^{7}	7^{7}
(Australia) S Groth	6^{3}	6^{5}
(Canada) P Polansky	4	1
8	(Dominican Republic) V Estrella Burgos	6	6
3	(Canada) V Pospisil	7	7
(United States) A Kuznetsov	5	5
WC	(Australia) B Tomic	6	7^{7}
5	(Colombia) A Falla	1	6^{2}

Quarterfinals
1	(France) R Gasquet	3	4
8	(Dominican Republic) V Estrella Burgos	6	6
3	(Canada) V Pospisil	4	4
WC	(Australia) B Tomic	6	6

Semifinals
8	(Dominican Republic) V Estrella Burgos	6^{2}	7^{7}	6^{5}
WC	(Australia) B Tomic	7^{7}	6^{5}	7^{7}

=== Bottom half ===
First round
6	(Colombia) A González	7	3	6
(Russia) E Donskoy	5	6	4
(Netherlands) T de Bakker	2	7^{7}	6
Q	(United States) K King	6	6^{4}	3
WC	(Colombia) E Struvay	3	4
(Argentina) G Pella	6	6
7	(Australia) M Ebden	4	0^{r}
Q	(United Kingdom) J Ward	6	3
(Poland) M Przysiężny	6^{4}	6	3
(Chinese Taipei) J Wang	7^{7}	4	6
(Israel) D Sela	6	6
(Argentina) F Argüello	4	2

Second round
6	(Colombia) A González	6	6
(Netherlands) T de Bakker	3	4
(Argentina) G Pella	6^{2}	2
4	(Czech Republic) R Štěpánek	7^{7}	6
Q	(United Kingdom) J Ward	3	1
(Chinese Taipei) J Wang	6	6
(Israel) D Sela	6^{8}	6^{5}
2	(Croatia) I Karlović	7^{10}	7^{7}

Quarterfinals
6	(Colombia) A González	4	4
4	(Czech Republic) R Štěpánek	6	6
(Chinese Taipei) J Wang	3	6^{6}
2	(Croatia) I Karlović	6	7^{8}

Semifinals
4	(Czech Republic) R Štěpánek	4	6	4
2	(Croatia) I Karlović	6	3	6

== Qualifying ==
=== Seeds ===
1. (United Kingdom) James Ward (qualified)
2. (Argentina) Juan Ignacio Londero (qualified)
3. (Colombia) Nicolás Barrientos (qualified)
4. (Colombia) Carlos Salamanca (qualifying competition)
5. (United States) Kevin King (qualified)
6. (New Zealand) Michael Venus (qualifying competition)
7. (Colombia) Juan Carlos Spir (second round)
8. (El Salvador) Marcelo Arévalo (qualifying competition)

=== Qualifiers ===
1. (United Kingdom) James Ward
2. (Argentina) Juan Ignacio Londero
3. (Colombia) Nicolás Barrientos
4. (United States) Kevin King

=== Qualifying draw ===
==== First qualifier ====
First round
(Mexico) Santiago González	6	6
(Mexico) Tigre Hank	2	1
(Colombia) Michael Quintero	6	6
(Colombia) Sebastián López	2	1
(Colombia) Pablo Tellez	1	4
8	(El Salvador) Marcelo Arévalo	6	6

Second round
1	(United Kingdom) James Ward	1	6	7^{7}
(Mexico) Santiago González	6	1	6^{3}
(Colombia) Michael Quintero	6	5	4
8	(El Salvador) Marcelo Arévalo	2	7	6

Qualifying competition
1	(United Kingdom) James Ward	3	6	6
8	(El Salvador) Marcelo Arévalo	6	4	2

==== Second qualifier ====
First round					Second round					Qualifying competition
					2	(Argentina) Juan Ignacio Londero	6	6
WC	(Colombia) Juan Espinel	6	0	1		(Colombia) Mateo Andrés Ruíz Naranjo	2	4
	(Colombia) Mateo Andrés Ruíz Naranjo	4	6	6						2	(Argentina) Juan Ignacio Londero	6	7^{12}
(India) Divij Sharan		6	6							6	(New Zealand) Michael Venus	4	6^{10}
(Colombia) Juan Montes		0	1			(India) Divij Sharan	6	3	5
					6	(New Zealand) Michael Venus	4	6	7

==== Third qualifier ====
First round
WC	(Colombia) José Fernando Carvajal Torres	6	6
(Thailand) Sanchai Ratiwatana	2	2
(Mexico) César Ramírez	6	6
(United States) Scott Lipsky	2	1
(Thailand) Sonchat Ratiwatana	3	1
7	(Colombia) Juan Carlos Spir	6	6

Second round
3	(Colombia) Nicolás Barrientos	6	7^{7}
WC	(Colombia) José Fernando Carvajal Torres	0	6^{5}
(Mexico) César Ramírez	7	6^{3}	6
7	(Colombia) Juan Carlos Spir	5	7^{7}	3

Qualifying competition
3	(Colombia) Nicolás Barrientos	6	6
(Mexico) César Ramírez	1	4

==== Fourth qualifier ====
First round				Second round				Qualifying competition
				4	(Colombia) Carlos Salamanca	6	6
(Colombia) Steffen Zornosa		4	4		(Colombia) Daniel Elahi Galán	4	3
(Colombia) Daniel Elahi Galán		6	6					4	(Colombia) Carlos Salamanca	7	6^{3}	2
WC	(Colombia) Manuel Arias	2	4					5	(United States) Kevin King	5	7^{7}	6
	(Ecuador) Julio César Campozano	6	6		(Ecuador) Julio César Campozano	1	6^{4}
				5	(United States) Kevin King	6	7^{7}
