= 2013 Claro Open Colombia – Singles =

Singles
- 2013 Claro Open Colombia

Final
- Champion: (Croatia) Ivo Karlović
- Runner-up: (Colombia) Alejandro Falla
- Score: 6–3, 7–6^{(7–4)}

Events
Singles	Doubles
Claro Open Colombia	· 2014 →

Ivo Karlović won the first edition of the tournament, defeating Alejandro Falla 6–3, 7–6^{(7–4)} in the final.

== Seeds ==
1. (Serbia) Janko Tipsarević (quarterfinals)
2. (South Africa) Kevin Anderson (semifinals)
3. (Netherlands) Igor Sijsling (second round)
4. (France) Édouard Roger-Vasselin (second round)
5. (France) Adrian Mannarino (quarterfinals)
6. (Colombia) Santiago Giraldo (quarterfinals)
7. (Slovenia) Aljaž Bedene (first round)
8. (Belgium) Xavier Malisse (first round)

== Draw ==
=== Key ===
- Q = Qualifier
- WC = Wild card
- LL = Lucky loser
- Alt = Alternate
- SE = Special exempt
- PR = Protected ranking
- ITF = ITF entry
- JE = Junior exempt
- w/o = Walkover
- r = Retired
- d = Defaulted
- SR = Special ranking

=== Finals ===
Semifinals
(Colombia) Alejandro Falla	6^{4}	6	6
(Canada) Vasek Pospisil	7^{7}	3	4
(Croatia) Ivo Karlović	6	6^{4}	6
2	(South Africa) Kevin Anderson	4	7^{7}	3

Final
(Colombia) Alejandro Falla	3	6^{4}
(Croatia) Ivo Karlović	6	7^{7}

=== Top half ===
First round
WC	(Colombia) N Barrientos	5	3
(Belgium) R Bemelmans	7	6
(Chinese Taipei) J Wang	1	6	1
(Australia) M Ebden	6	2	6
(Colombia) A Falla	6	3	6
8	(Belgium) X Malisse	1	6	1
(Ukraine) I Marchenko	3	6	0
(Italy) M Viola	6	2	6
(Canada) V Pospisil	6	3	6
(Poland) M Przysiężny	3	6	1
(Australia) J Duckworth	6	6
7	(Slovenia) A Bedene	3	4

Second round
1	(Serbia) J Tipsarević	6	7
(Belgium) R Bemelmans	4	5
(Australia) M Ebden	6^{1}	1
(Colombia) A Falla	7^{7}	6
4	(France) É Roger-Vasselin	3	5
(Italy) M Viola	6	7
(Canada) V Pospisil	7	3	7
(Australia) J Duckworth	5	6	5

Quarterfinals
1	(Serbia) J Tipsarević	6	2	3
(Colombia) A Falla	3	6	6
(Italy) M Viola	6	3	2
(Canada) V Pospisil	3	6	6

Semifinals
(Colombia) A Falla	6^{4}	6	6
(Canada) V Pospisil	7^{7}	3	4

=== Bottom half ===
First round
5	(France) A Mannarino	6	0	6
(Colombia) A González	4	6	4
(Argentina) F Argüello	5	3
Q	(Dominican Republic) V Estrella	7	6
Q	(Argentina) JI Londero	6^{5}	4
(Croatia) I Karlović	7^{7}	6
6	(Colombia) S Giraldo	6	6
WC	(Colombia) C Salamanca	2	4
(Kazakhstan) E Korolev	1	0^{r}
Q	(Australia) C Guccione	6	1
Q	(Ecuador) E Gómez	6	6
WC	(Colombia) E Struvay	4	4

Second round
5	(France) A Mannarino	6	6
Q	(Dominican Republic) V Estrella	1	2
(Croatia) I Karlović	6	7^{16}
3	(Netherlands) I Sijsling	3	6^{14}
6	(Colombia) S Giraldo	3	6	6
Q	(Australia) C Guccione	6	3	4
Q	(Ecuador) E Gómez	3	6^{2}
2	(South Africa) K Anderson	6	7^{7}

Quarterfinals
5	(France) A Mannarino	6^{5}	6^{3}
(Croatia) I Karlović	7^{7}	7^{7}
6	(Colombia) S Giraldo	3	3
2	(South Africa) K Anderson	6	6

Semifinals
(Croatia) I Karlović	6	6^{4}	6
2	(South Africa) K Anderson	4	7^{7}	3

== Qualifying ==
=== Seeds ===
All seeds, along with four other players, received a bye into the second round.

1. (Argentina) Guido Andreozzi (qualifying competition)
2. (Ukraine) Denys Molchanov (second round)
3. (Brazil) Fabiano de Paula (qualifying competition)
4. (Argentina) Agustín Velotti (qualifying competition)
5. (Dominican Republic) Víctor Estrella (qualified)
6. (El Salvador) Marcelo Arévalo (second round)
7. (Colombia) Michael Quintero (qualifying competition)
8. (Australia) Chris Guccione (qualified)

=== Qualifiers ===
1. (Argentina) Juan Ignacio Londero
2. (Ecuador) Emilio Gómez
3. (Australia) Chris Guccione
4. (Dominican Republic) Víctor Estrella

=== Qualifying draw ===
==== First qualifier ====
First round				Second round				Qualifying competition
				1	(Argentina) Guido Andreozzi	6	6
(United States) James Cerretani	6	6			(United States) James Cerretani	3	0
(Colombia) Pedro Pablo Ruiz	3	1						1	(Argentina) Guido Andreozzi	2	6	5
(Argentina) Juan Ignacio Londero	3	6	6						(Argentina) Juan Ignacio Londero	6	1	7
(Colombia) Daniel Elahi Galán	6	4	3		(Argentina) Juan Ignacio Londero	6	6
				6	(El Salvador) Marcelo Arévalo	4	4

==== Second qualifier ====
First round				Second round					Qualifying competition
				2	(Ukraine) Denys Molchanov	6^{2}	6	4
	(Ecuador) Emilio Gómez	6	6		(Ecuador) Emilio Gómez	7^{7}	2	6
WC	(Colombia) Barlaham Zuluaga-Gavíria	3	0							(Ecuador) Emilio Gómez	6	6
(Peru) Sergio Galdós		6	6						7	(Colombia) Michael Quintero	4	2
(Colombia) Mateo Andrés Ruiz-Naranjo		1	1		(Peru) Sergio Galdós	6	5	5
				7	(Colombia) Michael Quintero	4	7	7

==== Third qualifier ====
Second round
3	(Brazil) Fabiano de Paula	6	6
(Colombia) Felipe Rojas	1	4
(Canada) Adil Shamasdin	1	4
8	(Australia) Chris Guccione	6	6

Qualifying competition
3	(Brazil) Fabiano de Paula	3	7^{11}	3
8	(Australia) Chris Guccione	6	6^{9}	6

==== Fourth qualifier ====
Second round
4	(Argentina) Agustín Velotti	6	7
(Colombia) Felipe Mantilla	2	5
(Germany) Frank Moser	1	4
5	(Dominican Republic) Víctor Estrella	6	6

Qualifying competition
4	(Argentina) Agustín Velotti	3	2
5	(Dominican Republic) Víctor Estrella	6	6
