= 2014 Claro Open Colombia – Doubles =

Doubles
- 2014 Claro Open Colombia

Final
- Champions: (Australia) Samuel Groth (Australia) Chris Guccione
- Runners-up: (Colombia) Nicolás Barrientos (Colombia) Juan Sebastián Cabal
- Score: 7–6^{(7–5)}, 6–7^{(3–7)}, [11–9]

Events
| Singles | Doubles |
| ← 2013 · | Claro Open Colombia | · 2015 → |

Purav Raja and Divij Sharan were the defending champions, but decided not to participate together. Raja played alongside Marcelo Demoliner, while Sharan teams up with Adil Shamasdin. The two teams met in the quarterfinals, with Shamasdin and Sharan winning the match. Shamasdin and Sharan lost to Samuel Groth and Chris Guccione in the semifinals.
Groth and Guccione went on to win the title, defeating [[]] and Juan Sebastián Cabal in the final, 7–6^{(7–5)}, 6–7^{(3–7)}, [11–9].

== Seeds ==
1. (Canada) Vasek Pospisil / (Czech Republic) Radek Štěpánek (quarterfinals, withdrew)
2. (Mexico) Santiago González / (United States) Scott Lipsky (first round)
3. (Australia) Samuel Groth / (Australia) Chris Guccione (champions)
4. (United Kingdom) Ken Skupski / (United Kingdom) Neal Skupski (first round)

== Draw ==
=== Key ===
- Q = Qualifier
- WC = Wild card
- LL = Lucky loser
- Alt = Alternate
- SE = Special exempt
- PR = Protected ranking
- ITF = ITF entry
- JE = Junior exempt
- w/o = Walkover
- r = Retired
- d = Defaulted
- SR = Special ranking

=== Draw ===
First round
1 | (Canada) V Pospisil (Czech Republic) R Štěpánek | 3 | 6 | [10]
(Israel) J Erlich (United States) R Ram | 6 | 3 | [6]
WC | (Colombia) C Salamanca (Colombia) E Struvay | 7^{7} | 6
(United States) N Monroe (New Zealand) M Venus | 6^{5} | 3
4 | (United Kingdom) K Skupski (United Kingdom) N Skupski | 4 | 6^{4}
(Dominican Republic) V Estrella Burgos (France) A Mannarino | 6 | 7^{7}
WC | (Argentina) F Argüello (Colombia) M Quintero | 4 | 6 | [4]
(Colombia) N Barrientos (Colombia) JS Cabal | 6 | 4 | [10]
(Thailand) Sa Ratiwatana (Thailand) So Ratiwatana | 6^{4} | 7 | [10]
(Israel) D Sela (Chinese Taipei) J Wang | 7^{7} | 5 | [8]
Alt | (Mexico) C Ramírez (Australia) B Tomic | 2 | 3
3 | (Australia) S Groth (Australia) C Guccione | 6 | 6
(Brazil) M Demoliner (India) P Raja | 7 | 6
(Colombia) A González (Colombia) JC Spir | 5 | 4
(Canada) A Shamasdin (India) D Sharan | 6 | 7
2 | (Mexico) S González (United States) S Lipsky | 2 | 5

Quarterfinals
1 | (Canada) V Pospisil (Czech Republic) R Štěpánek
WC | (Colombia) C Salamanca (Colombia) E Struvay | w/o
(Dominican Republic) V Estrella Burgos (France) A Mannarino | 5 | 4
(Colombia) N Barrientos (Colombia) JS Cabal | 7 | 6
(Thailand) Sa Ratiwatana (Thailand) So Ratiwatana | 6^{5} | 5
3 | (Australia) S Groth (Australia) C Guccione | 7^{7} | 7
(Brazil) M Demoliner (India) P Raja | 2 | 4
(Canada) A Shamasdin (India) D Sharan | 6 | 6

Semifinals
WC | (Colombia) C Salamanca (Colombia) E Struvay | 6 | 4 | [7]
(Colombia) N Barrientos (Colombia) JS Cabal | 4 | 6 | [10]
3 | (Australia) S Groth (Australia) C Guccione | 7^{8} | 4 | [19]
(Canada) A Shamasdin (India) D Sharan | 6^{6} | 6 | [17]

Final
(Colombia) N Barrientos (Colombia) JS Cabal | 6^{5} | 7^{7} | [9]
3 | (Australia) S Groth (Australia) C Guccione | 7^{7} | 6^{3} | [11]
