= 2015 Claro Open Colombia – Doubles =

Doubles
- 2015 Claro Open Colombia

Final
- Champions: (France) Édouard Roger-Vasselin (Czech Republic) Radek Štěpánek
- Runners-up: (Croatia) Mate Pavić (New Zealand) Michael Venus
- Score: 7–5, 6–3

Events
Singles	Doubles
← 2014 ·	Claro Open Colombia	· 2016 →

Sam Groth and Chris Guccione were the defending champions, but lost in the quarterfinals to Wesley Koolhof and Matwé Middelkoop.
Édouard Roger-Vasselin and Radek Štěpánek won the title, defeating Mate Pavić and Michael Venus in the final, 7–5, 6–3.

== Seeds ==
1. (Philippines) Treat Huey / (United States) Rajeev Ram (first round)
2. (Australia) Sam Groth / (Australia) Chris Guccione (quarterfinals)
3. (Croatia) Mate Pavić / (New Zealand) Michael Venus (final)
4. (United Kingdom) Jonathan Marray / (Pakistan) Aisam-ul-Haq Qureshi (first round)

== Draw ==
=== Key ===
- Q = Qualifier
- WC = Wild card
- LL = Lucky loser
- Alt = Alternate
- SE = Special exempt
- PR = Protected ranking
- ITF = ITF entry
- JE = Junior exempt
- w/o = Walkover
- r = Retired
- d = Defaulted
- SR = Special ranking

=== Draw ===
First round
1	(Philippines) T Huey (United States) R Ram	6	3	[5]
(France) F Martin (India) P Raja	1	6	[10]
PR	(Tunisia) M Jaziri (Spain) P Riba	1	2
(Australia) M Ebden (France) A Mannarino	6	6
3	(Croatia) M Pavić (New Zealand) M Venus	6	7^{11}
WC	(Colombia) A Falla (Colombia) A González	4	6^{9}
(Argentina) A Molteni (Chile) H Podlipnik-Castillo	6^{4}	4
WC	(Colombia) JS Gómez (Colombia) E Struvay	7^{7}	6
PR	(France) É Roger-Vasselin (Czech Republic) R Štepánek	6	6
(Colombia) N Barrientos (Dominican Republic) V Estrella Burgos	3	4
(Brazil) M Demoliner (Spain) A Menéndez-Maceiras	4	6	[10]
4	(United Kingdom) J Marray (Pakistan) A-u-H Qureshi	6	3	[5]
(Netherlands) W Koolhof (Netherlands) M Middelkoop	6	6
(United States) A Krajicek (Ukraine) I Marchenko	2	3
(United Kingdom) C Fleming (United Kingdom) J Ward	4^{r}
2	(Australia) S Groth (Australia) C Guccione	5

Quarterfinals
(France) F Martin (India) P Raja	6	6
(Australia) M Ebden (France) A Mannarino	4	4
3	(Croatia) M Pavić (New Zealand) M Venus	2	6	[10]
WC	(Colombia) JS Gómez (Colombia) E Struvay	6	3	[5]
PR	(France) É Roger-Vasselin (Czech Republic) R Štepánek	7	7
(Brazil) M Demoliner (Spain) A Menéndez-Maceiras	5	5
(Netherlands) W Koolhof (Netherlands) M Middelkoop	4	7^{7}	[10]
2	(Australia) S Groth (Australia) C Guccione	6	6^{5}	[8]

Semifinals
(France) F Martin (India) P Raja	6	3	[9]
3	(Croatia) M Pavić (New Zealand) M Venus	4	6	[11]
PR	(France) É Roger-Vasselin (Czech Republic) R Štepánek	6	7^{7}
(Netherlands) W Koolhof (Netherlands) M Middelkoop	1	6^{4}

Final
3	(Croatia) M Pavić (New Zealand) M Venus	5	3
PR	(France) É Roger-Vasselin (Czech Republic) R Štepánek	7	6
