= 2014 Claro Open Colombia =

- Date: 14–20 July 2014
- Edition: 2nd
- Surface: Hard
- Location: Bogotá, Colombia

Champions

Singles
- (Australia) Bernard Tomic

Doubles
- (Australia) Samuel Groth / (Australia) Chris Guccione
← 2013 ·	Claro Open Colombia	· 2015 →

The 2014 Claro Open Colombia was a professional tennis tournament played on hard courts. It was the second edition of the tournament, which was part of the 2014 ATP World Tour. It took place in Bogotá, Colombia at Centro de Alto Rendimiento, between 14 and 20 July 2014.

== Singles main-draw entrants ==
=== Seeds ===
Country	Player	Rank^{1}	Seed
FRA	Richard Gasquet	14	1
CRO	Ivo Karlović	31	2
CAN	Vasek Pospisil	33	3
CZE	Radek Štěpánek	37	4
COL	Alejandro Falla	56	5
COL	Alejandro González	72	6
AUS	Matthew Ebden	78	7
DOM	Víctor Estrella Burgos	90	8

- ^{1} Rankings are as of July 7, 2014

=== Other entrants ===
The following players received wildcards into the singles main draw:

- (Colombia) Juan Sebastián Cabal
- (Colombia) Eduardo Struvay
- (Australia) Bernard Tomic

The following players received entry from the qualifying draw:

- (Colombia) Nicolás Barrientos
- (United States) Kevin King
- (Argentina) Juan Ignacio Londero
- (United Kingdom) James Ward

=== Withdrawals ===
Before the tournament

- (Argentina) Máximo González
- (Russia) Dmitry Tursunov

=== Retirements ===
- (Australia) Matthew Ebden (wrist injury)

== Doubles main-draw entrants ==
=== Seeds ===
Country	Player	Country	Player	Rank^{1}	Seed
CAN	Vasek Pospisil	CZE	Radek Štěpánek	42	1
MEX	Santiago González	USA	Scott Lipsky	83	2
AUS	Samuel Groth	AUS	Chris Guccione	100	3
GBR	Ken Skupski	GBR	Neal Skupski	137	4

- ^{1} Rankings are as of July 7, 2014

=== Other entrants ===
The following pairs received wildcards into the doubles main draw:

- (Argentina) Facundo Argüello / (Colombia) Michael Quintero
- (Colombia) Carlos Salamanca / (Colombia) Eduardo Struvay

The following pair received entry as alternates:

- (Mexico) César Ramírez / (Australia) Bernard Tomic

=== Withdrawals ===
Before the tournament

- (Australia) Matthew Ebden (wrist injury)

During the tournament

- (Czech Republic) Radek Štěpánek (left harmstring injury)

== Champions ==
=== Singles ===
- (Australia) Bernard Tomic def. (Croatia) Ivo Karlović, 7–6^{(7–5)}, 3–6, 7–6^{(7–4)}

=== Doubles ===
- (Australia) Samuel Groth / (Australia) Chris Guccione def. (Colombia) Nicolás Barrientos / (Colombia) Juan Sebastián Cabal, 7–6^{(7–5)}, 6–7^{(3–7)}, [11–9]
