= 2015 Claro Open Colombia =

- Date: 20–26 July 2015
- Edition: 3rd
- Surface: Hard
- Location: Bogotá, Colombia

Champions

Singles
- (Australia) Bernard Tomic

Doubles
- (France) Édouard Roger-Vasselin / (Czech Republic) Radek Štěpánek
← 2014 ·	Claro Open Colombia	· 2016 →

The 2015 Claro Open Colombia was a professional tennis tournament played on hard courts. It was the third edition of the tournament, and part of the 2015 ATP World Tour. It took place in Bogotá, Colombia at Centro de Alto Rendimiento, between 20 and 26 July 2015.

== Singles main-draw entrants ==
=== Seeds ===
Country	Player	Rank^{1}	Seed
CRO	Ivo Karlović	24	1
AUS	Bernard Tomic	25	2
FRA	Adrian Mannarino	35	3
DOM	Víctor Estrella Burgos	43	4
CYP	Marcos Baghdatis	48	5
AUS	Sam Groth	68	6
TUN	Malek Jaziri	85	7
GBR	James Ward	89	8

- ^{1} Rankings are as of July 13, 2015

=== Other entrants ===
The following players received wildcards into the singles main draw:

- (Colombia) Nicolás Barrientos
- (Colombia) Daniel Elahi Galán
- (Czech Republic) Radek Štěpánek

The following players received entry from the qualifying draw:

- (Brazil) Marcelo Demoliner
- (Australia) Matthew Ebden
- (Colombia) Alejandro Gómez
- (United States) Alexander Sarkissian

=== Withdrawals ===
Before the tournament

- (Australia) James Duckworth →replaced by Édouard Roger-Vasselin
- (Canada) Vasek Pospisil →replaced by Rajeev Ram

== Doubles main-draw entrants ==
=== Seeds ===
Country	Player	Country	Player	Rank^{1}	Seed
PHI	Treat Huey	USA	Rajeev Ram	92	1
AUS	Sam Groth	AUS	Chris Guccione	109	2
CRO	Mate Pavić	NZL	Michael Venus	113	3
GBR	Jonathan Marray	PAK	Aisam-ul-Haq Qureshi	117	4

- ^{1} Rankings are as of July 13, 2015

=== Other entrants ===
The following pairs received wildcards into the doubles main draw:

- (Colombia) Alejandro Falla / (Colombia) Alejandro González
- (Colombia) Juan Sebastián Gómez / (Colombia) Eduardo Struvay

=== Retirements ===
- (United Kingdom) Colin Fleming

== Champions ==
=== Singles ===
- (Australia) Bernard Tomic def. (France) Adrian Mannarino, 6–1, 3–6, 6–2

=== Doubles ===
- (France) Édouard Roger-Vasselin / (Czech Republic) Radek Štěpánek def. (Croatia) Mate Pavić / (New Zealand) Michael Venus, 7–5, 6–3
