= 2013 Claro Open Colombia – Doubles =

Doubles
- 2013 Claro Open Colombia

Final
- Champions: (India) Purav Raja (India) Divij Sharan
- Runners-up: (France) Édouard Roger-Vasselin (Netherlands) Igor Sijsling
- Score: 7–6^{(7–4)}, 7–6^{(7–3)}

Events
Singles	Doubles
Claro Open Colombia	· 2014 →

Purav Raja and Divij Sharan won the first edition of the tournament, defeating Édouard Roger-Vasselin and Igor Sijsling in the final, 7–6^{(7–4)}, 7–6^{(7–3)}.

== Seeds ==
1. (Colombia) Juan Sebastián Cabal / (Colombia) Robert Farah (semifinals)
2. (France) Édouard Roger-Vasselin / (Netherlands) Igor Sijsling (final)
3. (Brazil) Marcelo Demoliner / (Brazil) André Sá (first round)
4. (India) Purav Raja / (India) Divij Sharan (champions)

== Draw ==
=== Key ===
- Q = Qualifier
- WC = Wild card
- LL = Lucky loser
- Alt = Alternate
- SE = Special exempt
- PR = Protected ranking
- ITF = ITF entry
- JE = Junior exempt
- w/o = Walkover
- r = Retired
- d = Defaulted
- SR = Special ranking

=== Draw ===
First round
1	(Colombia) JS Cabal (Colombia) R Farah	2	7^{9}	[13]
(Poland) M Przysiężny (Canada) A Shamasdin	6	6^{7}	[11]
Alt	(El Salvador) M Arévalo (Dominican Republic) V Estrella	6	7^{7}
(Ukraine) D Molchanov (Chinese Taipei) J Wang	3	6^{4}
4	(India) P Raja (India) D Sharan	6	6
WC	(Ecuador) E Gómez (Colombia) M Quintero	2	2
(Brazil) F de Paula (Peru) S Galdós	1	2
(United States) N Monroe (Canada) V Pospisil	6	6
WC	(Colombia) A González (Colombia) C Salamanca	4	6^{4}
(United States) J Cerretani (Australia) C Guccione	6	7^{7}
(Croatia) I Karlović (Germany) F Moser	6	6
3	(Brazil) M Demoliner (Brazil) A Sá	4	3
(France) A Mannarino (Italy) M Viola	6	6
(Argentina) G Andreozzi (Argentina) F Argüello	1	2
(Australia) M Ebden (Ukraine) I Marchenko	6^{7}	1
2	(France) É Roger-Vasselin (Netherlands) I Sijsling	7^{9}	6

Quarterfinals
1	(Colombia) JS Cabal (Colombia) R Farah	4	7^{7}	[10]
Alt	(El Salvador) M Arévalo (Dominican Republic) V Estrella	6	6^{3}	[8]
4	(India) P Raja (India) D Sharan	3	6	[10]
(United States) N Monroe (Canada) V Pospisil	6	3	[6]
(United States) J Cerretani (Australia) C Guccione	6^{6}	6^{3}
(Croatia) I Karlović (Germany) F Moser	7^{8}	7^{7}
(France) A Mannarino (Italy) M Viola	6^{0}	6	[2]
2	(France) É Roger-Vasselin (Netherlands) I Sijsling	7	3	[10]

Semifinals
1	(Colombia) JS Cabal (Colombia) R Farah	2	3
4	(India) P Raja (India) D Sharan	6	6
(Croatia) I Karlović (Germany) F Moser	1	6^{3}
2	(France) É Roger-Vasselin (Netherlands) I Sijsling	6	7^{7}

Final
4	(India) P Raja (India) D Sharan	7^{7}	7^{7}
2	(France) É Roger-Vasselin (Netherlands) I Sijsling	6^{4}	6^{3}
