= 2015 Claro Open Colombia – Singles =

Singles
- 2015 Claro Open Colombia

Final
- Champion: (Australia) Bernard Tomic
- Runner-up: (France) Adrian Mannarino
- Score: 6–1, 3–6, 6–2

Events
| Singles | Doubles |
- Claro Open Colombia

Bernard Tomic was the last edition champion, and he successfully defended his title by defeating Adrian Mannarino in the final, 6–1, 3–6, 6–2.

== Seeds ==
The top four seeds receive a bye into the second round.

1. (Croatia) Ivo Karlović (semifinals)
2. (Australia) Bernard Tomic (champion)
3. (France) Adrian Mannarino (final)
4. (Dominican Republic) Víctor Estrella Burgos (quarterfinals)
5. (Cyprus) Marcos Baghdatis (first round)
6. (Australia) Sam Groth (second round)
7. (Tunisia) Malek Jaziri (quarterfinals)
8. (United Kingdom) James Ward (first round)

== Draw ==
Key

- Q = Qualifier
- WC = Wild card
- LL = Lucky loser
- Alt = Alternate
- ITF = ITF entry
- PR = Protected ranking
- SR = Special ranking
- SE = Special exempt
- JE = Junior exempt
- JR = Junior Accelerator Programme entrant
- CO = College Accelerator Programme entrant
- NG = Next Gen Accelerator Program entrant
- w/o = Walkover
- r = Retired
- d = Defaulted

=== Finals ===
Semifinals
1 | (Croatia) Ivo Karlović | 6^{5} | 6^{5}
3 | (France) Adrian Mannarino | 7^{7} | 7^{7}
(Germany) Michael Berrer | 4 | 7^{7} | 6^{3}
2 | (Australia) Bernard Tomic | 6 | 6^{4} | 7^{7}

Final
3 | (France) Adrian Mannarino | 1 | 6 | 2
2 | (Australia) Bernard Tomic | 6 | 3 | 6

=== Top half ===
First round
PR | (Spain) P Riba | 6^{3} | 3
WC | (Colombia) DE Galán | 7^{7} | 6
WC | (Czech Republic) R Štěpánek | 3 | 6 | 6
(France) É Roger-Vasselin | 6 | 3 | 4
(Argentina) G Pella | 5 | 6 | 5
6 | (Australia) S Groth | 7 | 4 | 7
(Colombia) A Falla | 4 | 6 | 3
(United States) R Ram | 6 | 3 | 6
Q | (United States) A Sarkissian | 6 | 6
(Australia) J Millman | 3 | 3
(United States) A Krajicek | 7^{7} | 2 | 4
7 | (Tunisia) M Jaziri | 6^{5} | 6 | 6

Second round
1 | (Croatia) I Karlović | 6^{12} | 6 | 6
WC | (Colombia) DE Galán | 7^{14} | 1 | 3
WC | (Czech Republic) R Štěpánek | 6 | 6
6 | (Australia) S Groth | 4 | 0
3 | (France) A Mannarino | 7 | 6
(United States) R Ram | 5 | 3
Q | (United States) A Sarkissian | 7^{7} | 3 | 2
7 | (Tunisia) M Jaziri | 6^{1} | 6 | 6

Quarterfinals
1 | (Croatia) I Karlović | 3 | 7^{9} | 6
WC | (Czech Republic) R Štěpánek | 6 | 6^{7} | 4
3 | (France) A Mannarino | 1 | 6 | 6
7 | (Tunisia) M Jaziri | 6 | 1 | 3

Semifinals
1 | (Croatia) I Karlović | 6^{5} | 6^{5}
3 | (France) A Mannarino | 7^{7} | 7^{7}

=== Bottom half ===
First round
8 | (United Kingdom) J Ward | 4 | 7^{9} | 5
(Germany) M Berrer | 6 | 6^{7} | 7
(Ukraine) I Marchenko | 3 | 5
Q | (Brazil) M Demoliner | 6 | 7
(Japan) Y Sugita | 3 | 6 | 6
WC | (Colombia) N Barrientos | 6 | 3 | 4
5 | (Cyprus) M Baghdatis | 3 | 6 | 6^{3}
Q | (Colombia) A Gómez | 6 | 0 | 7^{7}
(Japan) T Ito | 1 | 6 | 6
Q | (Australia) M Ebden | 6 | 3 | 4
(Spain) A Menéndez Maceiras | 4 | 6 | 7^{11}
(Colombia) A González | 6 | 4 | 6^{9}

Second round
(Germany) M Berrer | 6 | 7^{7}
Q | (Brazil) M Demoliner | 3 | 6^{3}
(Japan) Y Sugita | 4 | 7^{7} | 2
4 | (Dominican Republic) V Estrella Burgos | 6 | 6^{4} | 6
Q | (Colombia) A Gómez | 1 | 7 | 0
(Japan) T Ito | 6 | 5 | 6
(Spain) A Menéndez Maceiras | 7^{7} | 2 | 4
2 | (Australia) B Tomic | 6^{5} | 6 | 6

Quarterfinals
(Germany) M Berrer | 6 | 3 | 6
4 | (Dominican Republic) V Estrella Burgos | 3 | 6 | 3
(Japan) T Ito | 1 | 4
2 | (Australia) B Tomic | 6 | 6

Semifinals
(Germany) M Berrer | 4 | 7^{7} | 6^{3}
2 | (Australia) B Tomic | 6 | 6^{4} | 7^{7}

== Qualifying ==
=== Seeds ===
1. (Australia) Matthew Ebden (qualified)
2. (United States) Alexander Sarkissian (qualified)
3. (Argentina) Andrés Molteni (second round)
4. (Switzerland) Marco Chiudinelli (second round)
5. (Argentina) Juan Ignacio Londero (qualifying competition)
6. (Colombia) Eduardo Struvay (second round)
7. (United States) Kevin King (qualifying competition)
8. (Argentina) Facundo Mena (qualifying competition)

=== Qualifiers ===
1. (Australia) Matthew Ebden
2. (United States) Alexander Sarkissian
3. (Colombia) Alejandro Gómez
4. (Brazil) Marcelo Demoliner

=== Qualifying draw ===
==== First qualifier ====
First round
(Bolivia) Alejandro Mendoza | 4 | 4
(United Kingdom) Colin Fleming | 6 | 6
(Colombia) Juan Sebastián Gómez | 6 | 6
WC | (Colombia) Juan José Mateus Rubiano | 2 | 1
(Colombia) Daniel Mora | 2 | 4
6 | (Colombia) Eduardo Struvay | 6 | 6

Second round
1 | (Australia) Matthew Ebden | 4 | 6 | 6
(United Kingdom) Colin Fleming | 6 | 2 | 3
(Colombia) Juan Sebastián Gómez | 0 | 7 | 6
6 | (Colombia) Eduardo Struvay | 6 | 5 | 4

Qualifying competition
1 | (Australia) Matthew Ebden | 7^{7} | 7^{9}
(Colombia) Juan Sebastián Gómez | 6^{2} | 6^{7}

==== Second qualifier ====
First round
WC | (Colombia) Rodrigo Echeverría | 6 | 5 | 3
(Colombia) Juan Montes | 4 | 7 | 6
(Colombia) Camilo Andrés Erazo | 1 | 4
(Colombia) Michael Quintero | 6 | 6
(Colombia) Mateo Andrés Ruíz Naranjo | 1 | 3
8 | (Argentina) Facundo Mena | 6 | 6

Second round
2 | (United States) Alexander Sarkissian | 6 | 6
(Colombia) Juan Montes | 0 | 3
(Colombia) Michael Quintero | 3 | 2
8 | (Argentina) Facundo Mena | 6 | 6

Qualifying competition
2 | (United States) Alexander Sarkissian | 6 | 6
8 | (Argentina) Facundo Mena | 3 | 1

==== Third qualifier ====
First round
(Colombia) Felipe Rojas | 5 | 3
(Colombia) Alejandro Gómez | 7 | 6
(Netherlands) Matwé Middelkoop | 6^{4} | 3
(Colombia) Carlos Salamanca | 7^{7} | 6
WC | (Mexico) Manuel Sánchez | 2 | 4
5 | (Argentina) Juan Ignacio Londero | 6 | 6

Second round
3 | (Argentina) Andrés Molteni | 6^{9} | 7^{7} | 5
(Colombia) Alejandro Gómez | 7^{11} | 6^{3} | 7
(Colombia) Carlos Salamanca | 4 | 2
5 | (Argentina) Juan Ignacio Londero | 6 | 6

Qualifying competition
(Colombia) Alejandro Gómez | 6 | 6
5 | (Argentina) Juan Ignacio Londero | 4 | 2

==== Fourth qualifier ====
First round
4 | (Switzerland) Marco Chiudinelli | 6 | 6
WC | (Colombia) Ricardo Pabón Cuesta | 1 | 4
(Brazil) Marcelo Demoliner | 3 | 6 | 6
(Dominican Republic) Jesús Francisco Félix | 6 | 0 | 0
(Netherlands) Wesley Koolhof | 3 | 6^{5}
(Australia) Chris Guccione | 6 | 7^{7}
(Colombia) José Daniel Bendeck | 2 | 2
7 | (United States) Kevin King | 6 | 6

Second round
4 | (Switzerland) Marco Chiudinelli | 4 | 4
(Brazil) Marcelo Demoliner | 6 | 6
(Australia) Chris Guccione | 7^{7} | 2 | 4
7 | (United States) Kevin King | 6^{5} | 6 | 6

Qualifying competition
(Brazil) Marcelo Demoliner | 6 | 6
7 | (United States) Kevin King | 4 | 4
