= 2013 Claro Open Colombia =

- Date: 15–21 July
- Edition: 1st
- Category: World Tour 250
- Draw: 28S / 16D
- Surface: Hard / outdoor
- Location: Bogotá, Colombia
- Venue: Centro de Alto Rendimiento

Champions

Singles
- (Croatia) Ivo Karlović

Doubles
- (India) Purav Raja / (India) Divij Sharan
- Claro Open Colombia

The 2013 Claro Open Colombia was a men's professional tennis tournament played on outdoor hard courts. It was the first edition of the tournament, which was part of the 2013 ATP World Tour. It took place in Bogotá, Colombia at Centro de Alto Rendimiento, between 15 and 21 July 2013.

The Croatian Ivo Karlović was crowned first winner of the Claro Open Colombia after beating the Colombian Alejandro Falla in the final by 6-3 7-6(4) in a game that lasted one hour and 18 minutes. Karlovic was the surprise package of the 2013 edition, in a tournament that boasted the likes of the Serbian Janko Tipsarević and the South African Kevin Anderson.

In the doubles, the Indian couple formed by Purav Raja and Divij Sharan were crowned winners after defeating the Dutch Igor Sijsling and the French Édouard Roger-Vasselin by 7-6(4) and 7-6(3) in an hour and 30 minutes.

== Singles main-draw entrants ==
=== Seeds ===
Country	Player	Rank^{1}	Seed
SRB	Janko Tipsarević	14	1
RSA	Kevin Anderson	22	2
NED	Igor Sijsling	55	3
FRA	Édouard Roger-Vasselin	71	4
FRA	Adrian Mannarino	76	5
COL	Santiago Giraldo	82	6
SLO	Aljaž Bedene	87	7
BEL	Xavier Malisse	88	8

- ^{1} Rankings are as of July 8, 2013

=== Other entrants ===
The following players received wildcards into the singles main draw:

- (Colombia) Nicolás Barrientos
- (Colombia) Carlos Salamanca
- (Colombia) Eduardo Struvay

The following players received entry from the qualifying draw:

- (Dominican Republic) Víctor Estrella
- (Ecuador) Emilio Gómez
- (Australia) Chris Guccione
- (Argentina) Juan Ignacio Londero

=== Withdrawals ===
Before the tournament

- (Russia) Igor Andreev
- (United States) Denis Kudla
- (Luxembourg) Gilles Müller
- (United States) Rajeev Ram
- (United States) Michael Russell
- (United States) Jack Sock

=== Retirements ===
- (Kazakhstan) Evgeny Korolev (illness)

== Doubles main-draw entrants ==
=== Seeds ===
Country	Player	Country	Player	Rank^{1}	Seed
COL	Juan Sebastián Cabal	COL	Robert Farah	87	1
FRA	Édouard Roger-Vasselin	NED	Igor Sijsling	93	2
BRA	Marcelo Demoliner	BRA	André Sá	144	3
IND	Purav Raja	IND	Divij Sharan	204	4

- ^{1} Rankings are as of July 8, 2013

=== Other entrants ===
The following pairs received wildcards into the doubles main draw:

- (Ecuador) Emilio Gómez / (Colombia) Michael Quintero
- (Colombia) Alejandro González / (Colombia) Carlos Salamanca

The following pair received entry as alternates:

- (El Salvador) Marcelo Arévalo / (Dominican Republic) Víctor Estrella

=== Withdrawals ===
Before the tournament

- (Belgium) Xavier Malisse (illness)

== Finals ==
=== Singles ===
- (Croatia) Ivo Karlović defeated (Colombia) Alejandro Falla, 6–3, 7–6^{(7–4)}

=== Doubles ===
- (India) Purav Raja / (India) Divij Sharan defeated (France) Édouard Roger-Vasselin / (Netherlands) Igor Sijsling, 7–6^{(7–4)}, 7–6^{(7–3)}
