= Colombia Open =

Tennis tournament in Colombia

Defunct tennis tournament
- Founded: 2013; 13 years ago
- Abolished: 2015; 11 years ago
- Location: Bogotá, Colombia
- Venue: Centro de Alto Rendimiento
- Category: ATP World Tour 250 series
- Surface: Hard / outdoor
- Draw: 28S / 32Q / 16D
- Prize money: $727,000

The Colombia Open (sponsored by Claro and called the Claro Open Colombia) was a professional men's tennis tournament played on outdoor hardcourts in Bogotá, Colombia. The event was affiliated with the Association of Tennis Professionals (ATP), and was a 250 series tournament on the ATP World Tour and was played on a hard surface. It took place during the second week of July, before the start of the North American swing and the US Open.

The tournament replaced the Los Angeles Open on the ATP World Tour starting in 2013. IMLA de Colombia bought the rights of the Los Angeles Open in 2013 and transferred the tournament to the city of Bogotá.

The Colombia Open was the fifth tournament affiliated with the ATP held in Latin America, after the tournaments in Viña del Mar (Chile), São Paulo (Brazil), Acapulco (Mexico) and Buenos Aires (Argentina). It was also the tournament with the most prize money in South America, with a total of $727,000.

In a first edition that boasted the likes of the Serbian Janko Tipsarević and the South African Kevin Anderson, the Croatian Ivo Karlović was the surprise package, claiming the title after defeating the Colombian Alejandro Falla in the final. Karlovic's victory was his fifth ATP title and his first since 2008. In doubles, the Indian duo formed by Purav Raja and Divij Sharan defeated the Dutch Igor Sijsling and the French Édouard Roger-Vasselin claiming their first-ever ATP trophy.

The Colombia Open was replaced in 2016 calendar by the Los Cabos Open, Mexico with the other tournaments in Latin America being Córdoba, Buenos Aires, Rio, Acapulco and Santiago during February.

== Results ==
=== Singles ===
Year	Champion	Runner-up	Score
2013	(Croatia) Ivo Karlović	(Colombia) Alejandro Falla	6–3, 7–6^{(7–4)}
2014	(Australia) Bernard Tomic	(Croatia) Ivo Karlović	7–6^{(7–5)}, 3–6, 7–6^{(7–4)}
2015	(Australia) Bernard Tomic (2)	(France) Adrian Mannarino	6–1, 3–6, 6–2

=== Doubles ===
Year	Champions	Runners-up	Score
2013	(India) Purav Raja (India) Divij Sharan	(France) Édouard Roger-Vasselin (Netherlands) Igor Sijsling	7–6^{(7–4)}, 7–6^{(7–3)}
2014	(Australia) Samuel Groth (Australia) Chris Guccione	(Colombia) Nicolás Barrientos (Colombia) Juan Sebastián Cabal	7–6^{(7–5)}, 6–7^{(3–7)}, [11–9]
2015	(France) Édouard Roger-Vasselin (Czech Republic) Radek Štěpánek	(Croatia) Mate Pavić (New Zealand) Michael Venus	7–5, 6–3

=== Statistics ===
==== Championships by player ====
Player	Singles	Doubles	Win-Loss	Total	Years
(Australia) Bernard Tomic	2	0	2–0	2	2014 (S), 2015 (S)
(Croatia) Ivo Karlović	1	0	1–1	2	2013 (S), 2014 (S)
(France) Édouard Roger-Vasselin	0	1	1–1	2	2013 (D), 2015 (D)
(Czech Republic) Radek Štěpánek	0	1	1–0	1	2015 (D)
(Australia) Samuel Groth	0	1	1–0	1	2014 (D)
(Australia) Chris Guccione	0	1	1–0	1	2014 (D)
(India) Purav Raja	0	1	1–0	1	2013 (D)
(India) Divij Sharan	0	1	1–0	1	2013 (D)

==== Championships by country ====
Country	Singles	First	Last	Doubles	First	Last	Overall
Australia (AUS)	2	2014	2015	1	2014	2014	3
Croatia (CRO)	1	2013	2013	0			1
France (FRA)	0			1	2015	2015	1
Czech Republic (CZE)	0			1	2015	2015	1
India (IND)	0			1	2013	2013	1
