= Divij Sharan =

Indian tennis player

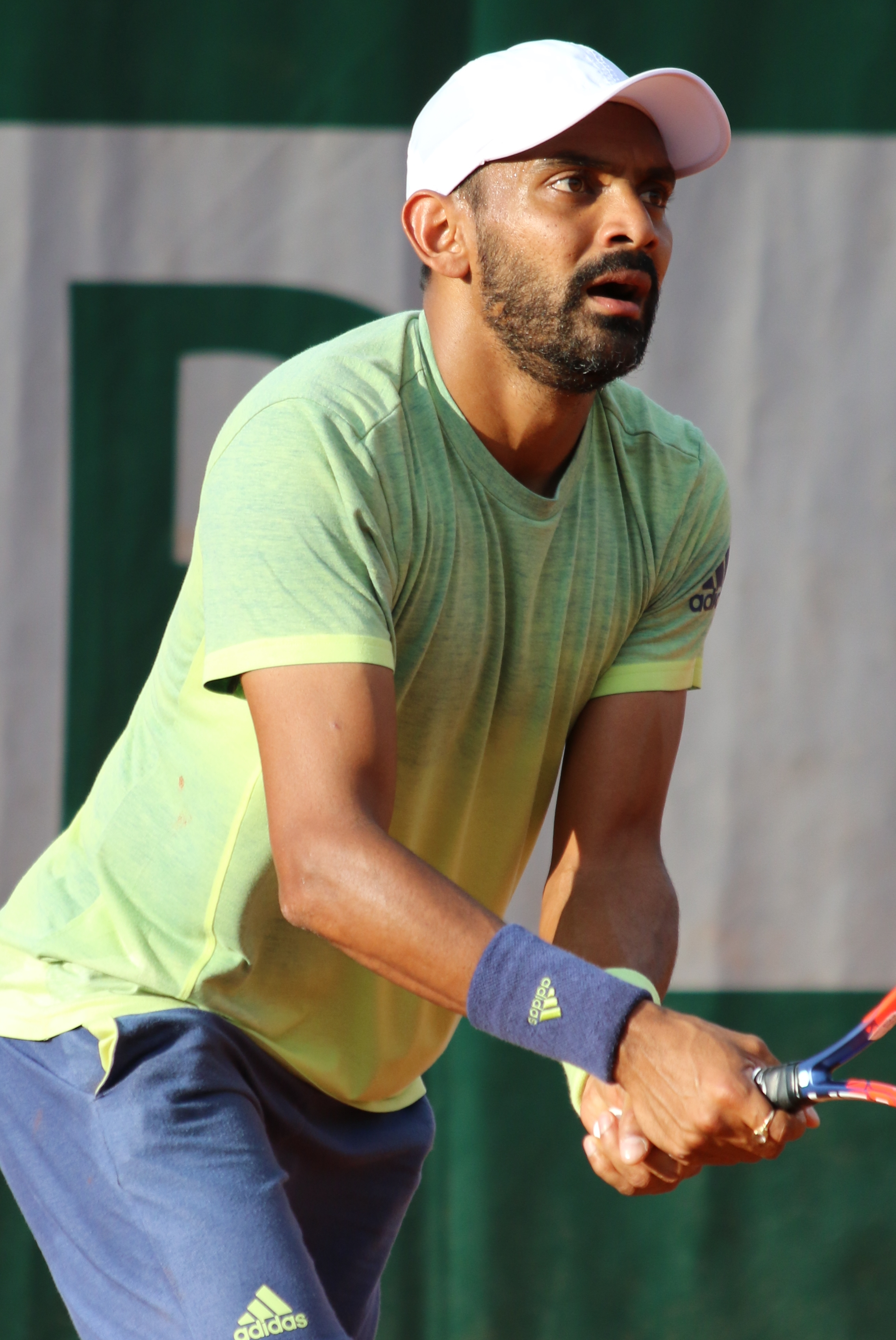
- Sharan at the 2018 French Open
- Country (sports): India
- Residence: New Delhi, Delhi, India
- Born: 2 March 1986 (age 40) Delhi, India
- Height: 6 ft 0 in (1.83 m)
- Turned pro: 2004
- Plays: Left-handed (two-handed backhand)
- Prize money: $952,334

Singles
- Career record: 0–0
- Career titles: 0
- Highest ranking: No. 438 (30 July 2007)

Doubles
- Career record: 111–121
- Career titles: 5
- Highest ranking: No. 36 (16 July 2018)
- Current ranking: No. 397 (17 March 2025)

Grand Slam doubles results
- Australian Open: 3R (2018)
- French Open: 3R (2017)
- Wimbledon: QF (2018)
- US Open: 3R (2013)

Grand Slam mixed doubles results
- French Open: 1R (2019)
- Wimbledon: 2R (2019, 2021)
Medal record
Representing India
Men's tennis
Asian Games
Gold medal – first place	2018 Jakarta	Men's Doubles
Bronze medal – third place	2014 Incheon	Men's Doubles
South Asian Games
Gold medal – first place	2016 Guwahati	Mixed Doubles
Silver medal – second place	2016 Guwahati	Men's Doubles
- Last updated on: 19 March 2025.

Divij Sharan (born 2 March 1986) is an Indian professional tennis player. He specialises in doubles and competes on the ATP World Tour. He has won five ATP doubles titles and represents India in the Davis Cup. He won a gold medal in the men's doubles at the 2018 Asian Games.

== Early and Personal life ==
Sharan was born in New Delhi. He began playing tennis at the age of seven at a local tennis academy. His favorite surfaces are grass and hard courts. His overall favorite shot is the volley. His idols growing up were Roger Federer, Mahesh Bhupathi and Leander Paes.

He married British tennis player Samantha Murray in July 2019.

== Junior career ==
Sharan's best junior world doubles ranking was No. 5 in 2003. His best result in Grand Slam junior championships was his semifinal appearance at the 2004 French Open where he partnered with compatriot Tushar Liberhan.

== Professional career ==
=== Early years ===
Sharan turned pro in 2004. He found limited success in singles and developed as doubles specialist. He won his first Futures doubles title 3 years later, in 2007. He reached his first doubles ATP Challenger finals in 2010 at the Kyoto Challenger in Japan. He won his first doubles ATP Challenger title in September 2011 at the Ningbo Challenger in China. He continued to find success in doubles at both ITF and Challenger events. By the end of 2011, he had won 16 ITF titles and 1 ATP Challenger title.

=== 2012: Breakthrough ===
2012 proved to be a breakthrough year for Sharan on the ATP Challenger Tour. He reached 8 ATP Challenger doubles finals and won 2 titles in the year. Sharan won the Busan Challenger with Yuki Bhambri and the Bangkok Challenger with Vishnu Vardhan. In September, Sharan made his Davis Cup debut against New Zealand. With his good run he entered into list of top 100 ranked doubles players and later finished the year close to top 100 doubles ranking at 107.

=== 2013: First ATP World Tour title, top 100 debut ===
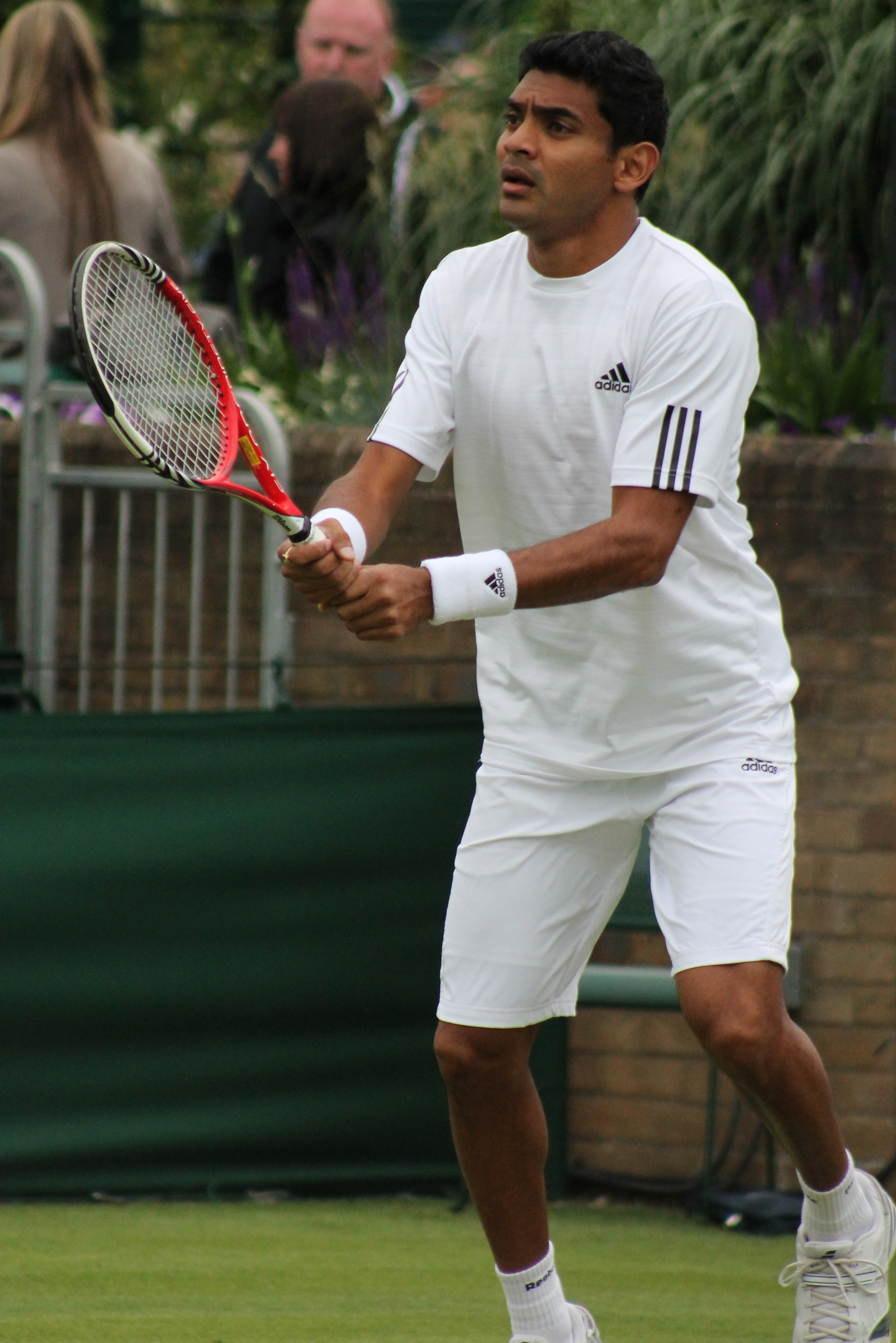
Divij Sharan playing at Wimbledon in 2013

Sharan continued to impress at Challenger events. He reached 5 finals and won a title at the Kyoto Challenger. This was his first title with his most successful partner Purav Raja. The pair played together throughout the year and they found their biggest success by winning their first ATP World Tour title at the 2013 Claro Open in Bogota, Colombia. They defeated the second-seeded French-Dutch combination of Édouard Roger-Vasselin and Igor Sijsling in the final.

Sharan entered the qualifying draw at the 2013 Wimbledon Championships with Raja, with the pair successfully qualifying for the main draw. They lost in the first round to Nicholas Monroe and Simon Stadler. This was the first match at a Grand Slam event for both Raja and Sharan. At the 2013 US Open, Sharan partnered with Lu Yen-hsun from Chinese Taipei. The pair reached the third round where they lost to Aisam-ul-Haq Qureshi and Jean-Julien Rojer.

As a result of this good run, Sharan finished the year inside the top 100 doubles rankings for the first time at 71.

=== 2014: Asian Games medal ===
Sharan reached 4 Challenger finals and won 2 titles in the year 2014. He won the Kyoto Challenger with Purav Raja and the Shanghai Challenger with Yuki Bhambri. His best result at an ATP World Tour event was a semifinal appearance at the 2014 Claro Open where he had partnered with Canadian player Adil Shamasdin.

At the 2014 Asian Games, Sharan won a bronze medal for India with Yuki Bhambri.

=== 2015: Out of top 100 ===
The year 2015 was not so successful for Sharan. He played with many different partners and reached 4 Challenger finals, winning 2 of them. He won the Guzzini Challenger with British partner Ken Skupski and the Izmir Challenger with compatriot Saketh Myneni. He played only a singles match at ATP World Tour level and lost it. He finished the year ranked 134 as a doubles player.

=== 2016: Second ATP title, back to top 100 ===
Sharan made an excellent comeback in 2016. He partnered with Purav Raja and reached 6 ATP Challenger finals, winning 4 of them. They won the Manchester Trophy Challenger, Aegon Surbiton Trophy, Open Castilla y León and Pune Challenger. The pair also won their second ATP World Tour title at the Los Cabos Open in Mexico. They defeated the pair of Jonathan Erlich and Ken Skupski in the final. Sharan finished the year with doubles ranking of No. 63.

=== 2017: Entry into the top 50 ===
Sharan started the new season on strong note. He reached his third ATP World Tour final at the 2017 Chennai Open partnering with Purav Raja. In an all Indian final, they lost to the team of Rohan Bopanna and Jeevan Nedunchezhiyan. He then reached his fourth ATP World Tour final and won his third ATP title in Belgium at the European Open with his new partner Scott Lipsky. They defeated the pair of Santiago González and Julio Peralta in the final.

Sharan had good run on the Challenger Tour as well. He reached four finals winning two of it. He won titles in Bordeaux with Purav Raja and Bangaluru with Mikhail Elgin. On the back of good results, Sharan entered the top-50 on 27 November 2017 and has been holding a spot inside the top-50 since then.

=== 2018: Asian Games gold medal, first Grand Slam quarter final ===
Sharan started year with Maharashtra Open where he paired with compatriot Yuki Bhambri. The pair reached to the semis but lost to French pair of Pierre-Hugues Herbert and Gilles Simon. At Australian Open, he reached third round thus making his best performance at the event.

He won his first Challenger title of the season at Canberra Challenger. He continued with few more Challenger tournaments till April but later moved his focus entirely on ATP world tour.

At Wimbledon Championships, Sharan reached his first Gland Slam quarter-finals. He partnered with Artem Sitak from New Zealand. They lost to eventual champions Mike Bryan and Jack Sock.

Sharan finished another year inside the top 50 with doubles ranking of 39.

=== 2019: Fourth and fifth titles ===
Sharan began the year teaming up with his compatriot Rohan Bopanna. The new pairing started off with a bang by capturing the Pune open doubles title in front of the home crowd. This was Sharan's 4th title on ATP tour. Following this result the pair lost a few close matches and they mutually decided to end their partnership citing their low combined ranking as the primary reason behind the split. Divij then teamed up with the Brazilian doubles specialist Marcelo Demolinor and reached the doubles final in the Bavarian open. Following this he reached the round of 16 in Wimbledon. Divij won his 5th title in ATP tour teaming up with Igor Zelenay in St Petersburg, Russia to win his second title of the year.

== ATP career finals ==
=== Doubles: 7 (5 titles, 2 runners-up) ===
Legend Grand Slam tournaments (0–0) ATP World Tour Finals (0–0) ATP World Tour Masters 1000 (0–0) ATP World Tour 500 Series (0–0) ATP World Tour 250 Series (5–2)	Titles by surface Hard (5–1) Clay (0–1) Grass (0–0)	Titles by setting Outdoor (3–2) Indoor (2–0)

Result	W–L	Date	Tournament	Tier	Surface	Partner	Opponents	Score
Win	1–0	Jul 2013	Colombia Open, Colombia	250 Series	Hard	(India) Purav Raja	(France) Édouard Roger-Vasselin (Netherlands) Igor Sijsling	7–6^{(7–4)}, 7–6^{(7–3)}
Win	2–0	Aug 2016	Los Cabos Open, Mexico	250 Series	Hard	(India) Purav Raja	(Israel) Jonathan Erlich (United Kingdom) Ken Skupski	7–6^{(7–4)}, 7–6^{(7–3)}
Loss	2–1	Jan 2017	Chennai Open, India	250 Series	Hard	(India) Purav Raja	(India) Rohan Bopanna (India) Jeevan Nedunchezhiyan	3–6, 4–6
Win	3–1	Oct 2017	European Open, Belgium	250 Series	Hard (i)	(United States) Scott Lipsky	(Mexico) Santiago González (Chile) Julio Peralta	6–4, 2–6, [10–5]
Win	4–1	Jan 2019	Maharashtra Open, India	250 Series	Hard	(India) Rohan Bopanna	(United Kingdom) Luke Bambridge (United Kingdom) Jonny O'Mara	6–3, 6–4
Loss	4–2	May 2019	Bavarian Championships, Germany	250 Series	Clay	(Brazil) Marcelo Demoliner	(Denmark) Frederik Nielsen (Germany) Tim Pütz	4–6, 2–6
Win	5–2	Sep 2019	St. Petersburg Open, Russia	250 Series	Hard (i)	(Slovakia) Igor Zelenay	(Italy) Matteo Berrettini (Italy) Simone Bolelli	6–3, 3–6, [10–8]

== Challenger and Futures finals ==
=== Singles: 3 (0–3) ===
Legend (singles) ATP Challenger Tour (0–0) ITF Futures Tour (0–3)	Titles by surface Hard (0–2) Clay (0–0) Grass (0–1) Carpet (0–0)

Result	W–L	Date	Tournament	Tier	Surface	Opponent	Score
Loss	0–1	Nov 2007	Pakistan F2, Lahore	Futures	Grass	(Pakistan) Aqeel Khan	6–4, 3–6, 4–6
Loss	0–2	Oct 2008	Nigeria F4, Lagos	Futures	Hard	(Slovakia) Kamil Čapkovič	4–6, 6–4, 4–6
Loss	0–3	Jun 2011	India F7, Delhi	Futures	Hard	(Sweden) Patrik Rosenholm	4–6, 4–6

=== Doubles: 73 (37–36) ===
Legend (doubles) ATP Challenger Tour (18–27) ITF Futures Tour (19–9)	Titles by surface Hard (26–27) Clay (5–6) Grass (4–2) Carpet (2–1)

Result	W–L	Date	Tournament	Tier	Surface	Partner	Opponents	Score
Loss	0–1	Jul 2006	Romania F11, Târgu Mureș	Futures	Clay	(Romania) Bogdan-Victor Leonte	(Romania) Adrian Cruciat (Romania) Victor Ioniță	4–6, 4–6
Win	1–1	Mar 2007	Nigeria F1, Benin City	Futures	Hard	(India) Navdeep Singh	(Chile) Guillermo Hormazábal (Chile) Hans Podlipnik Castillo	6–1, 6–3
Win	2–1	Mar 2007	Nigeria F2, Benin City	Futures	Hard	(India) Navdeep Singh	(Romania) Bogdan-Victor Leonte (Namibia) Jurgens Strydom	6–4, 6–4
Loss	2–2	May 2007	Kuwait F2, Mishref	Futures	Hard	(India) Navdeep Singh	(France) Thomas Oger (France) Nicolas Tourte	3–6, 2–6
Loss	2–3	Mar 2008	India F4, Gurgaon	Futures	Hard	(India) Vishnu Vardhan	(Chinese Taipei) Lee Hsin-han (China) Wang Yu jr.	6–7^{(4–7)}, 4–6
Win	3–3	Sep 2008	India F6, Chennai	Futures	Clay	(India) Vishnu Vardhan	(India) Ashutosh Singh (India) Sunil-Kumar Sipaeya	6–3, 4–6, [10–7]
Loss	3–4	Sep 2008	India F7, New Delhi	Futures	Hard	(India) Vishnu Vardhan	(India) Ashutosh Singh (India) Sunil-Kumar Sipaeya	2–6, 2–6
Win	4–4	Oct 2008	Nigeria F3, Lagos	Futures	Hard	(India) Rohan Gajjar	(Russia) Pavel Chekhov (Belarus) Pavel Katliarov	7–6^{(8–6)}, 6–7^{(2–7)}, [10–7]
Win	5–4	Mar 2009	India F1, Chandigarh	Futures	Hard	(India) Vishnu Vardhan	(India) Mithun Murali (India) Vijay Sundar Prashanth	4–6, 7–5, [10–7]
Win	6–4	May 2009	India F4, New Delhi	Futures	Hard	(India) Vishnu Vardhan	(India) Tushar Liberhan (India) Vishal Punna	6–1, 6–3
Win	7–4	Jul 2009	India F5, New Delhi	Futures	Hard	(India) Vishnu Vardhan	(India) Rohan Gajjar (India) Purav Raja	6–1, 7–5
Win	8–4	Jul 2009	India F6, New Delhi	Futures	Hard	(India) Vishnu Vardhan	(India) Vivek Shokeen (India) Ashutosh Singh	6–3, 6–4
Loss	8–5	Oct 2009	India F10, Kolkata	Futures	Hard	(India) Vishnu Vardhan	(India) Rohan Gajjar (India) Purav Raja	4–6, 5–7
Win	9–5	Oct 2009	India F11, Pune	Futures	Hard	(India) Vishnu Vardhan	(India) Rohan Gajjar (India) Purav Raja	7–5, 6–3
Loss	0–1	Mar 2010	Kyoto, Japan	Challenger	Carpet (i)	(India) Vishnu Vardhan	(Austria) Martin Fischer (Austria) Philipp Oswald	1–6, 2–6
Loss	9–6	Mar 2010	India F1, Kolkata	Futures	Hard	(India) Vishnu Vardhan	(India) Vivek Shokeen (India) Ashutosh Singh	3–6, 2–6
Win	10–6	Apr 2010	India F3, Vijayawada	Futures	Hard	(India) Vishnu Vardhan	(India) Sriram Balaji (India) Vignesh Peranamallur	2–6, 6–3, [10–3]
Win	11–6	Jul 2010	Great Britain F8, Manchester	Futures	Grass	(India) Vishnu Vardhan	(Republic of Ireland) Barry King (United States) Ashwin Kumar	6–2, 7–5
Loss	11–7	Jul 2010	Great Britain F9, Ilkley	Futures	Grass	(India) Vishnu Vardhan	(United Kingdom) Andrew Fitzpatrick (United Kingdom) Josh Goodall	6–3, 5–7, [3–10]
Win	12–7	Jul 2010	Great Britain F11, Chiswick	Futures	Hard	(India) Vishnu Vardhan	(United Kingdom) James Chaudry (United Kingdom) George Coupland	6–2, 6–2
Loss	0–2	Aug 2010	Karshi, Uzbekistan	Challenger	Hard	(India) Vishnu Vardhan	(China) Gong Maoxin (China) Li Zhe	3–6, 1–6
Loss	12–8	Oct 2010	Spain F35, Martos	Futures	Hard	(India) Vishnu Vardhan	(Spain) Agustín Boje-Ordóñez (Spain) Pablo Martín-Adalia	6–3, 6–7^{(2–7)}, [8–10]
Loss	12–9	Jan 2011	Cambodia F1, Phnom Penh	Futures	Hard	(India) Vishnu Vardhan	(Thailand) Danai Udomchoke (Thailand) Kittipong Wachiramanowong	4–6, 4–6
Win	13–9	Mar 2011	Australia F2, Berri	Futures	Grass	(India) Vishnu Vardhan	(Australia) Chris Letcher (Australia) Brendan Moore	4–6, 6–3, [10–8]
Win	14–9	Mar 2011	India F1, Mumbai	Futures	Hard	(India) Purav Raja	(Germany) Gero Kretschmer (Germany) Alexander Satschko	7–6^{(7–4)}, 7–6^{(7–5)}
Win	15–9	Mar 2011	India F2, Kolkata	Futures	Clay	(India) Vishnu Vardhan	(India) Sriram Balaji (India) Ashutosh Singh	7–6^{(7–1)}, 7–6^{(7–5)}
Win	16–9	Apr 2011	India F3, Chandigarh	Futures	Hard	(India) Vishnu Vardhan	(Chinese Taipei) Lee Hsin-han (Japan) Bumpei Sato	6–4, 4–6, [10–7]
Win	17–9	Jun 2011	India F7, Delhi	Futures	Hard	(India) Rohan Gajjar	(Japan) Takuto Niki (Russia) Vitali Reshetnikov	6–2, 7–6^{(9–7)}
Win	18–9	Jul 2011	France F11, Bourg-en-Bresse	Futures	Clay	(France) Laurent Rochette	(Belgium) Alexandre Folie (France) Florian Reynet	7–6^{(7–1)}, 6–0
Win	19–9	Jul 2011	France F12, Saint-Gervais	Futures	Clay	(Netherlands) Antal van der Duim	(France) Simon Cauvard (France) Baptiste Dupuy	6–3, 6–2
Win	1–2	Sep 2011	Ningbo, China	Challenger	Hard	(India) Karan Rastogi	(Czech Republic) Jan Hernych (Estonia) Jürgen Zopp	3–6, 7–6^{(7–3)}, [13–11]
Loss	1–3	Oct 2011	Seoul, South Korea	Challenger	Hard	(India) Purav Raja	(Thailand) Sanchai Ratiwatana (Thailand) Sonchat Ratiwatana	4–6, 6–7^{(3–7)}
Loss	1–4	Feb 2012	Burnie, Australia	Challenger	Hard	(India) Vishnu Vardhan	(Australia) John Peers (Australia) John-Patrick Smith	2–6, 4–6
Win	2–4	May 2012	Busan, South Korea	Challenger	Hard	(India) Yuki Bhambri	(Chinese Taipei) Hsieh Cheng-peng (Chinese Taipei) Lee Hsin-han	1–6, 6–1, [10–5]
Loss	2–5	Jul 2012	Penza, Russia	Challenger	Hard	(India) Yuki Bhambri	(Russia) Konstantin Kravchuk (Austria) Nikolaus Moser	7–6^{(7–5)}, 3–6, [7–10]
Loss	2–6	Aug 2012	Beijing, China	Challenger	Hard	(India) Yuki Bhambri	(Thailand) Sanchai Ratiwatana (Thailand) Sonchat Ratiwatana	6–7^{(3–7)}, 6–2, [6–10]
Loss	2–7	Aug 2012	Samarkand, Uzbekistan	Challenger	Clay	(India) Vishnu Vardhan	(Ukraine) Oleksandr Nedovyesov (Ukraine) Ivan Sergeyev	4–6, 6–7^{(1–7)}
Win	3–7	Sep 2012	Bangkok, Thailand	Challenger	Hard	(India) Vishnu Vardhan	(Chinese Taipei) Lee Hsin-han (Chinese Taipei) Peng Hsien-yin	6–3, 6–4
Loss	3–8	Sep 2012	Shanghai, China	Challenger	Hard	(India) Yuki Bhambri	(Thailand) Sanchai Ratiwatana (Thailand) Sonchat Ratiwatana	4–6, 4–6
Loss	3–9	Nov 2012	Loughborough, Great Britain	Challenger	Hard (i)	(India) Purav Raja	(United States) James Cerretani (Canada) Adil Shamasdin	4–6, 5–7
Win	4–9	Mar 2013	Kyoto, Japan	Challenger	Carpet (i)	(India) Purav Raja	(Australia) Chris Guccione (Australia) Matt Reid	6–4, 7–5
Loss	4–10	Apr 2013	León, Mexico	Challenger	Hard	(India) Purav Raja	(Australia) Chris Guccione (Australia) Matt Reid	3–6, 5–7
Loss	4–11	May 2013	Johannesburg, South Africa	Challenger	Hard	(India) Purav Raja	(India) Prakash Amritraj (United States) Rajeev Ram	6–7^{(1–7)}, 6–7^{(1–7)}
Loss	4–12	Jun 2013	Nottingham, Great Britain	Challenger	Grass	(India) Purav Raja	(Thailand) Sanchai Ratiwatana (Thailand) Sonchat Ratiwatana	7–6^{(7–5)}, 6–7^{(3–7)}, [8–10]
Loss	4–13	Oct 2013	Tashkent, Uzbekistan	Challenger	Hard	(India) Purav Raja	(Russia) Mikhail Elgin (Russia) Teymuraz Gabashvili	4–6, 4–6
Loss	4–14	Feb 2014	Kolkata, India	Challenger	Hard	(India) Vishnu Vardhan	(India) Saketh Myneni (India) Sanam Singh	3–6, 6–3, [4–10]
Win	5–14	Mar 2014	Kyoto, Japan	Challenger	Carpet (i)	(India) Purav Raja	(Thailand) Sanchai Ratiwatana (New Zealand) Michael Venus	5–7, 7–6^{(7–3)}, [10–4]
Win	6–14	Sep 2014	Shanghai, China	Challenger	Hard	(India) Yuki Bhambri	(India) Somdev Devvarman (India) Sanam Singh	7–6^{(7–2)}, 6–7^{(4–7)}, [10–8]
Loss	6–15	Oct 2014	Indore, India	Challenger	Hard	(India) Yuki Bhambri	(Spain) Adrián Menéndez Maceiras (Kazakhstan) Aleksandr Nedovyesov	6–2, 4–6, [3–10]
Loss	6–16	Mar 2015	Shenzhen, China	Challenger	Hard	(India) Saketh Myneni	(Germany) Gero Kretschmer (Germany) Alexander Satschko	1–6, 6–3, [2–10]
Loss	6–17	Apr 2015	Sarasota, USA	Challenger	Clay	(South Korea) Chung Hyeon	(Argentina) Facundo Argüello (Argentina) Facundo Bagnis	6–3, 2–6, [11–13]
Win	7–17	Jul 2015	Recanati, Italy	Challenger	Hard	(United Kingdom) Ken Skupski	(Serbia) Ilija Bozoljac (Italy) Flavio Cipolla	4–6, 7–6^{(7–3)}, [10–6]
Win	8–17	Sep 2015	Izmir, Turkey	Challenger	Hard	(India) Saketh Myneni	(Tunisia) Malek Jaziri (Ukraine) Denys Molchanov	7–6^{(7–5)}, 4–6, [0–1] ret.
Loss	8–18	Oct 2015	Pune, India	Challenger	Hard	(Austria) Maximilian Neuchrist	(Spain) Gerard Granollers (Spain) Adrián Menéndez Maceiras	6–1, 3–6, [6–10]
Loss	8–19	Apr 2016	Savannah, USA	Challenger	Clay	(India) Purav Raja	(United States) Brian Baker (United States) Ryan Harrison	7–5, 6–7^{(4–7)}, [8–10]
Win	9–19	Jun 2016	Manchester, Great Britain	Challenger	Grass	(India) Purav Raja	(United Kingdom) Ken Skupski (United Kingdom) Neal Skupski	6–3, 3–6, [11–9]
Win	10–19	Jun 2016	Surbiton, Great Britain	Challenger	Grass	(India) Purav Raja	(United Kingdom) Ken Skupski (United Kingdom) Neal Skupski	6–4, 7–6^{(7–3)}
Win	11–19	Jul 2016	Segovia, Spain	Challenger	Hard	(India) Purav Raja	(Spain) Quino Muñoz (Japan) Akira Santillan	6–3, 4–6, [10–8]
Win	12–19	Oct 2016	Pune, India	Challenger	Hard	(India) Purav Raja	(Switzerland) Luca Margaroli (France) Hugo Nys	3–6, 6–3, [11–9]
Loss	12–20	Nov 2016	Bratislava, Slovakia	Challenger	Hard (i)	(India) Purav Raja	(United Kingdom) Ken Skupski (United Kingdom) Neal Skupski	6–4, 3–6, [5–10]
Win	13–20	May 2017	Bordeaux, France	Challenger	Clay	(India) Purav Raja	(Mexico) Santiago González (New Zealand) Artem Sitak	6–4, 6–4
Loss	13–21	Oct 2017	Tashkent, Uzbekistan	Challenger	Hard	(India) Yuki Bhambri	(Chile) Hans Podlipnik Castillo (Belarus) Andrei Vasilevski	4–6, 2–6
Loss	13–22	Oct 2017	Brest, France	Challenger	Hard (i)	(United Kingdom) Scott Clayton	(Netherlands) Sander Arends (Croatia) Antonio Šančić	4–6, 5–7
Win	14–22	Nov 2017	Bangalore, India	Challenger	Hard	(Russia) Mikhail Elgin	(Croatia) Ivan Sabanov (Croatia) Matej Sabanov	6–3, 6–0
Win	15–22	Jan 2018	Canberra, Australia	Challenger	Hard	(Israel) Jonathan Erlich	(Chile) Hans Podlipnik Castillo (Belarus) Andrei Vasilevski	7–6^{(7–1)}, 6–2
Win	16–22	Sep 2019	Jinan, China	Challenger	Hard	(Australia) Matthew Ebden	(South Korea) Nam Ji-sung (South Korea) Song Min-kyu	7–6^{(7–4)}, 5–7, [10–3]
Loss	16–23	Sep 2020	Prostějov, Czech Republic	Challenger	Clay	(India) Sriram Balaji	(Czech Republic) Zdeněk Kolář (Czech Republic) Lukáš Rosol	2–6, 6–2, [6–10]
Loss	16–24	Apr 2022	Aguascalientes, Mexico	Challenger	Clay	(Portugal) Gonçalo Oliveira	(Colombia) Nicolás Barrientos (Mexico) Miguel Ángel Reyes-Varela	5-7, 3–6
Loss	16–25	Jul 2022	Indianapolis, USA	Challenger	Hard (i)	(India) Purav Raja	(Mexico) Hans Hach Verdugo (United States) Hunter Reese	6-7^{(3–7)}, 6–3, [7-10]
Win	17–25	Sep 2022	Istanbul, Turkey	Challenger	Hard	(India) Purav Raja	(India) Arjun Kadhe (Brazil) Fernando Romboli	6–4, 3–6, [10–8]
Loss	17–26	Oct 2022	Mouilleron-le-Captif, France	Challenger	Hard (i)	(India) Purav Raja	(Netherlands) Sander Arends (Netherlands) David Pel	7–6^{(7–1)}, 6–7^{(6–8)}, [6–10]
Win	18–26	Nov 2022	Helsinki, Finland	Challenger	Hard (i)	(India) Purav Raja	(United States) Reese Stalder (Greece) Petros Tsitsipas	6–7^{(5–7)}, 6–3, [10–8]
Loss	18–27	Mar 2023	Les Franqueses del Vallès, Spain	Challenger	Hard	(India) Purav Raja	(India) Anirudh Chandrasekar (India) Vijay Sundar Prashanth	5–7, 1–6

== Doubles performance timeline ==
Key
W	F	SF	QF	#R	RR	Q#	P#	DNQ	A	Z#	PO	G	S	B	NMS	NTI	P	NH

(W) winner; (F) finalist; (SF) semifinalist; (QF) quarterfinalist; (#R) rounds 4, 3, 2, 1; (RR) round-robin stage; (Q#) qualification round; (P#) preliminary round; (DNQ) did not qualify; (A) absent; (Z#) Davis/Fed Cup Zonal Group (with number indication) or (PO) play-off; (G) gold, (S) silver or (B) bronze Olympic/Paralympic medal; (NMS) not a Masters tournament; (NTI) not a Tier I tournament; (P) postponed; (NH) not held; (SR) strike rate (events won / competed); (W–L) win–loss record.
To avoid confusion and double counting, these charts are updated at the conclusion of a tournament or when the player's participation has ended.

Current through the 2021 US Open

Tournament	2013	2014	2015	2016	2017	2018	2019	2020	2021	SR	W–L
Australian Open	A	1R	A	A	1R	3R	1R	2R	1R	0 / 6	3–6
French Open	A	1R	A	A	3R	2R	2R	1R	1R	0 / 6	4–6
Wimbledon	1R	1R	A	A	2R	QF	3R	NH	1R	0 / 6	6–6
US Open	3R	A	A	A	1R	2R	1R	2R	1R	0 / 6	3–6
Win–loss	2–2	0–3	0–0	0–0	3–4	7–4	3–4	1–3	0–4	0 / 24	16–24
