= Alejandro Gómez (tennis) =

Colombian tennis player

- Country (sports): Colombia
- Born: 14 August 1991 (age 35) Cali, Colombia
- Height: 1.88 m (6 ft 2 in)
- Turned pro: 2015
- Retired: 2021 (last match played)
- Plays: Right-handed (two handed-backhand)
- Prize money: $114,149

Singles
- Career record: 1–1 (at ATP Tour level, Grand Slam level, and in Davis Cup)
- Career titles: 0
- Highest ranking: No. 352 (20 March 2017)

Doubles
- Career record: 0–0 (at ATP Tour level, Grand Slam level, and in Davis Cup)
- Career titles: 0
- Highest ranking: No. 161 (8 August 2022)

Alejandro Gómez (Latin American Spanish: [aleˈxandɾo ˈɣomes]; (Note: In isolation, Gómez is pronounced [ˈɡomes].) born 14 August 1991) is a former Colombian tennis player.

Gómez has a career high ATP singles ranking of world No. 352 achieved on 20 March 2017 and a career high ATP doubles ranking of No. 161 achieved on 8 August 2022.

Gómez made his ATP main draw singles debut at the 2015 Claro Open Colombia where he qualified for the main draw, defeating Felipe Rojas, Andrés Molteni and Juan Ignacio Londero in the qualifying rounds. In the main draw, he defeated fifth-seed Marcos Baghdatis in the first round, but lost to the Japanese Tatsuma Ito in the second round.

Gómez has a very fast and accurate serve, though one of his weaknesses are his frequent double faults, he has an average of 11 double faults per game. In fact, he recorded a 227 km/h at the 2015 Claro Open Colombia.

In August 2022, Gómez was suspended from competition after testing positive for cocaine. He was required to serve a period of ineligibility of fourteen months; that period starts on 15 December 2021, and ends on 14 February 2023.

== ATP Challenger Tour and ITF Futures finals ==
=== Singles: 6 (4–2) ===
Legend
ATP Challenger Tour (0–0)
ITF Futures (4–2)

=== Doubles: 14 (8–6) ===
Legend
ATP Challenger Tour (3–3)
ITF Futures (5–3)

Outcome	No.	Date	Tournament	Surface	Partner	Opponent	Score
Runner–up	1.	11 October 2015	Medellín, Colombia	Clay (red)	(Colombia) Felipe Mantilla	(Colombia) Nicolás Barrientos (Colombia) Eduardo Struvay	6–7^{(6–8)}, 7–6^{(7–4)}, [4–10]
Win	2.	18 September 2021	Quito, Ecuador	Clay	(Argentina) Thiago Agustín Tirante	(Spain) Adrián Menéndez Maceiras (Spain) Mario Vilella Martínez	7–5, 6–7^{(5–7)}, [10–8]
Runner–up	3.	25 September 2021	Ambato, Ecuador	Clay	(Argentina) Thiago Agustín Tirante	(Ecuador) Diego Hidalgo (Colombia) Cristian Rodríguez	3–6, 6–4, [3-10]
Runner–up	4.	23 October 2021	Bogotá, Colombia	Clay	(Colombia) Nicolás Barrientos	(Chile) Nicolás Jarry (Ecuador) Roberto Quiroz	7-6^{(7–4)}, 5–7, [4-10]
Win	5.	4 December 2021	São Paulo, Brazil	Clay	(Colombia) Nicolás Barrientos	(Brazil) Rafael Matos (Brazil) Felipe Meligeni Alves	w/o
Win	6.	11 December 2021	Florianópolis, Brazil	Clay	(Colombia) Nicolás Barrientos	(Uruguay) Martín Cuevas (Brazil) Rafael Matos	6–3, 6–3
