= Nicolás Barrientos =

Colombian tennis player (born 1987)

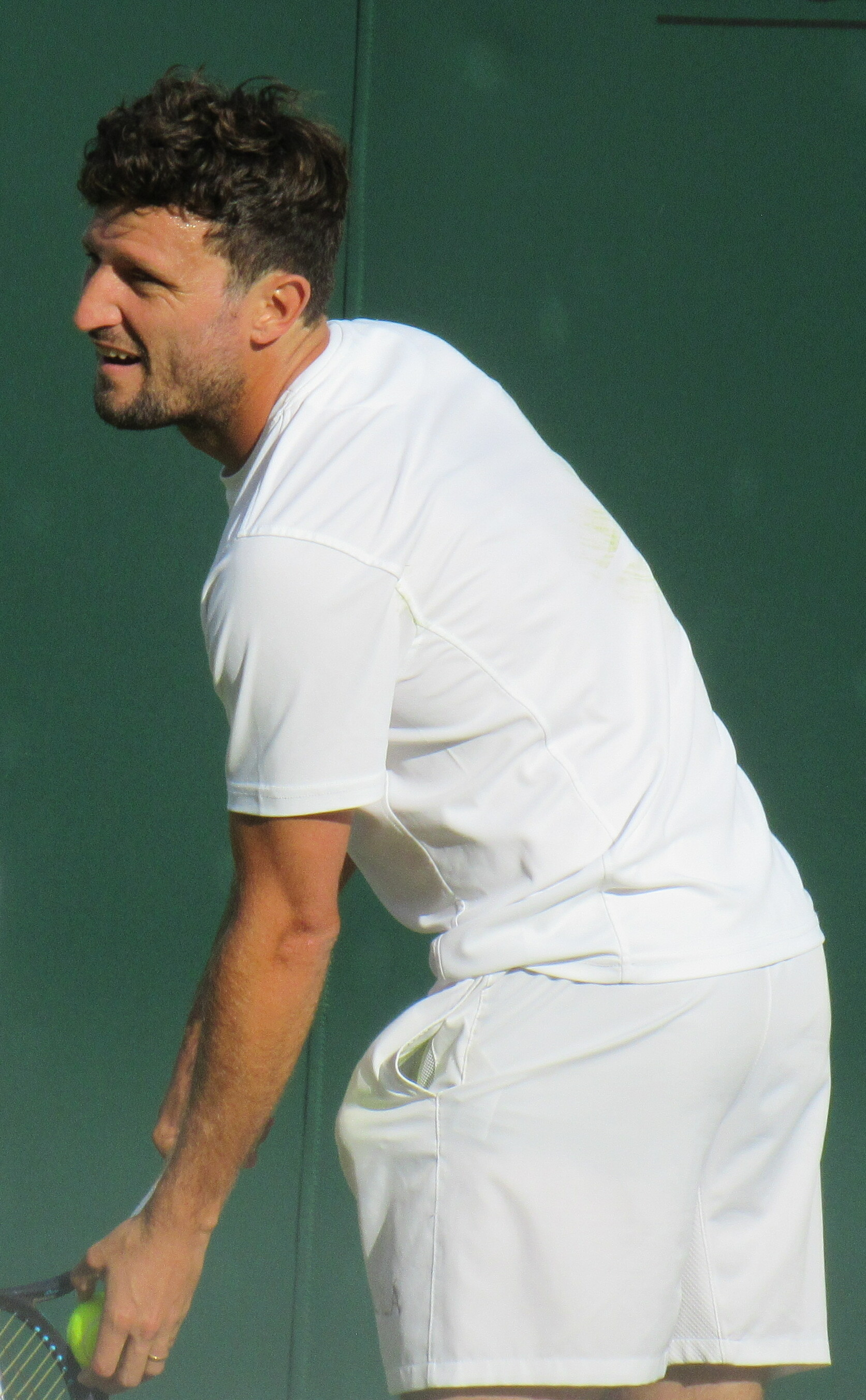
- Country (sports): Colombia
- Residence: Cali, Colombia
- Born: 24 April 1987 (age 39) Colombia
- Height: 1.75 m (5 ft 9 in)
- Turned pro: 2009
- Plays: Right-handed (two-handed backhand)
- College: University of West Florida
- Prize money: $ 1,038,869

Singles
- Career record: 1–5
- Highest ranking: No. 237 (21 September 2015)
- Current ranking: No. 930 (16 November 2026)

Doubles
- Career record: 63–66
- Career titles: 2
- Highest ranking: No. 47 (22 April 2024)
- Current ranking: No. 98 (16 November 2025)

Grand Slam doubles results
- Australian Open: 2R (2023, 2024)
- French Open: 2R (2023)
- Wimbledon: 2R (2024, 2025)
- US Open: 2R (2014, 2023, 2024)

Grand Slam mixed doubles results
- Wimbledon: 1R (2024)
Medal record
Representing Colombia
Men's tennis
| Event | 1st | 2nd | 3rd |
|---|---|---|---|
| Pan American Games | 1 | 1 | 0 |
| CAC Games | 1 | 0 | 1 |
| South American Games | 0 | 1 | 0 |
| Total | 2 | 2 | 1 |
Pan American Games
| Gold medal – first place | 2023 Santiago | Mixed doubles |
| Silver medal – second place | 2015 Toronto | Singles |
Central American and Caribbean Games
| Gold medal – first place | 2014 Veracruz | Team |
| Bronze medal – third place | 2014 Veracruz | Singles |
South American Games
| Silver medal – second place | 2014 Santiago | Doubles |
- Last updated on: 20 November 2025.

Nicolás Barrientos (Spanish pronunciation: [nikoˈlas βaˈrjentos]; (Note: In isolation, Barrientos is pronounced [baˈrjentos].) born 24 April 1987) is a Colombian professional tennis player who specializes in doubles. He reached his highest ATP doubles ranking of world No. 47 on 23 April 2024 and a singles ranking of No. 237 on 21 September 2015. Barrientos has won two ATP Tour doubles titles, including the 2024 Rio Open with Rafael Matos, and 24 doubles titles on the ATP Challenger Tour.

== Career ==
Barrientos made his first appearance on an ATP World Tour in July 2013 when he lost in the first round of 2013 Claro Open Colombia against Ruben Bemelmans.

He made his doubles Major debut at the 2014 US Open partnering compatriot Santiago Giraldo and won his first Major match against Colin Fleming and Ross Hutchins.

At the 2023 Córdoba Open he reached the quarterfinals with Ariel Behar. At the next Golden swing tournament, he reached the final at the 2023 Argentina Open also with Behar where they lost to Bolelli/Fognini.

In 2024, Barrientos began a partnership with Rafael Matos which started to produce good results. At the ATP 250 in Buenos Aires, they reached the semifinals, and in the following ATP 500 tournament in Rio de Janeiro, they won their biggest title, defeating strong pairs such as Krawietz/Putz, Bolelli/Vavassori and Erler/Miedler in the final. As a result, he reached the top 50 in the rankings on 4 March 2024.

Partnering Skander Mansouri, he was runner-up at the 2024 Almaty Open, losing to Rithvik Choudary Bollipalli and Arjun Kadhe in the final.

== Performance timeline ==
Key
| W | F | SF | QF | #R | RR | Q# | DNQ | A | NH |

(W) winner; (F) finalist; (SF) semifinalist; (QF) quarterfinalist; (#R) rounds 4, 3, 2, 1; (RR) round-robin stage; (Q#) qualification round; (DNQ) did not qualify; (A) absent; (NH) not held; (SR) strike rate (events won / competed); (W–L) win–loss record.
To avoid confusion and double counting, these charts are updated at the conclusion of a tournament or when the player's participation has ended.

=== Doubles ===
Current until 2026 ATP Tour.

| Tournament | 2013 | 2014 | ... | 2022 | 2023 | 2024 | 2025 | 2026 | SR | W-L | Win % |
|---|---|---|---|---|---|---|---|---|---|---|---|
Grand Slam tournaments
| Australian Open | A | A | | A | 2R | 2R | 1R | A | 0 / 3 | 2–3 | 40% |
| French Open | A | A | | A | 2R | 1R | 1R | 1R | 0 / 4 | 1–4 | 20% |
| Wimbledon | A | A | | 1R | A | 2R | 2R | 1R | 0 / 4 | 2–4 | 33% |
| US Open | A | 2R | | 1R | 2R | 2R | 1R | A | 0 / 4 | 3–4 | 43% |
| Win–loss | 0–0 | 1–1 | | 0–2 | 3–3 | 3–4 | 1–4 | 0-2 | 0 / 16 | 8–16 | 33% |
ATP Tour Masters 1000
| Indian Wells Masters | A | A | | A | A | A | A | A | 0 / 0 | 0–0 | – |
| Miami Open | A | A | | A | A | A | A | A | 0 / 0 | 0–0 | – |
| Madrid Open | A | A | | A | A | 1R | A | A | 0 / 1 | 0–1 | 0% |
| Italian Open | A | A | | A | A | A | A | A | 0 / 0 | 0–0 | – |
| Win–loss | 0–0 | 0–0 | | 0–0 | 0–0 | 0–1 | 0–0 | | 0 / 1 | 0–1 | 0% |
Career statistics
| Titles–Finals | 0–0 | 0–1 | | 0–1 | 0–1 | 1–2 | 1–2 | | 2–7 | | |
| Year-End Ranking | 134 | 84 | | 60 | 66 | 49 | 90 | 98 | | | |

== ATP Tour career finals ==
=== Doubles: 7 (2 title, 5 runner-ups) ===
| Legend Grand Slam Tournaments (0–0) ATP Finals (0–0) ATP Masters 1000 (0–0) ATP 500 (1–0) ATP 250 (1–5) | Finals by surface Hard (0–4) Clay (2–1) Grass (0–0) | Finals by setting Outdoor (2–4) Indoor (0–0) |

| Result | W–L | Date | Tournament | Tier | Surface | Partner | Opponents | Score |
|---|---|---|---|---|---|---|---|---|
| Loss | 0–1 | Jul 2014 | Colombia Open, Colombia | ATP 250 | Hard | (Colombia) Juan Sebastián Cabal | (Australia) Sam Groth (Australia) Chris Guccione | 6–7^{(5–7)}, 7–6^{(7–3)}, [9–11] |
| Loss | 0–2 | Oct 2022 | Korea Open, South Korea | ATP 250 | Hard | (Mexico) Miguel Ángel Reyes-Varela | (South Africa) Raven Klaasen (United States) Nathaniel Lammons | 1–6, 5–7 |
| Loss | 0–3 | Feb 2023 | Argentina Open, Argentina | ATP 250 | Clay | (Uruguay) Ariel Behar | (Italy) Simone Bolelli (Italy) Fabio Fognini | 2–6, 4–6 |
| Win | 1–3 | Feb 2024 | Rio Open, Brazil | ATP 500 | Clay | (Brazil) Rafael Matos | (Austria) Alexander Erler (Austria) Lucas Miedler | 6–4, 6–3 |
| Loss | 1–4 | Oct 2024 | Almaty Open, Kazakhstan | ATP 250 | Hard (i) | (Tunisia) Skander Mansouri | (India) Rithvik Choudary Bollipalli (India) Arjun Kadhe | 6–3, 6–7^{(3–7)}, [12–14] |
| Win | 2–4 | Mar 2025 | Chile Open, Chile | ATP 250 | Clay | (India) Rithvik Choudary Bollipalli | (Argentina) Máximo González (Argentina) Andrés Molteni | 6–3, 6–2 |
| Loss | 2–5 | Sep 2025 | Hangzhou Open, China | ATP 250 | Hard | (Netherlands) David Pel | (Portugal) Francisco Cabral (Austria) Lucas Miedler | 4–6, 4–6 |

== ATP Challenger finals ==
=== Doubles: 50 (24 titles, 26 runner-ups) ===
Finals by surface
Hard (7–9)
Clay (17–16)
Grass (0–1)

| Result | W–L | Date | Tournament | Surface | Partner | Opponents | Score |
|---|---|---|---|---|---|---|---|
| Winner | 1. | 25 March 2013 | Pereira, Colombia (1) | Clay | (Colombia) Eduardo Struvay | (Argentina) Facundo Bagnis (Argentina) Federico Delbonis | 3–6, 6–3,[10–7] |
| Runner–up | 2. | 22 July 2013 | Medellín, Colombia | Clay | (Colombia) Eduardo Struvay | (Ecuador) Emilio Gómez (Moldova) Roman Borvanov | 6–3, 7–6 ^{(7–4)} |
| Runner–up | 3. | 30 July 2013 | São Paulo, Brazil | Clay | (El Salvador) Marcelo Arévalo | (Brazil) Fernando Romboli (Argentina) Eduardo Schwank | 6–7^{(6–8)}, 6–4, [10–8] |
| Winner | 4. | 13 October 2013 | São José do Rio Preto, Brazil | Clay | (Colombia) Carlos Salamanca | (Brazil) Marcelo Demoliner (Brazil) João Souza | 6–4, 6–4 |
| Runner–up | 5. | 10 November 2013 | Bogotá, Colombia | Clay | (Colombia) Eduardo Struvay | (Colombia) Juan Sebastián Cabal (Colombia) Alejandro González | 6–3, 6–2 |
| Runner–up | 6. | 6 January 2014 | São Paulo, Brazil | Hard | (Dominican Republic) Víctor Estrella | (Germany) Gero Kretschmer (Germany) Alexander Satschko | 4–6, 7–5, [10–6] |
| Runner–up | 7. | 3 May 2014 | Cali, Colombia | Clay | (Colombia) Eduardo Struvay | (Argentina) Facundo Bagnis (Argentina) Eduardo Schwank | 6–3, 6–3 |
| Runner–up | 8. | 14 June 2014 | Fergana, Uzbekistan | Hard | (Russia) Stanislav Vovk | (Belarus) Sergey Betov (Belarus) Aliaksandr Bury | 6–7^{(6–8)}, 7–6^{(7–1)}, [10–3] |
| Winner | 9. | 27 September 2014 | Pereira, Colombia (2) | Clay (red) | (Colombia) Eduardo Struvay | (Argentina) Guido Pella (Argentina) Horacio Zeballos | 3–6, 6–3, [11–9] |
| Runner–up | 10. | 31 January 2015 | Bucaramanga, Colombia | Clay (red) | (Colombia) Eduardo Struvay | (Argentina) Guillermo Durán (Argentina) Andrés Molteni | 7–5, 6–7^{(8–10)}, [10–0] |
| Winner | 11. | 11 October 2015 | Medellín, Colombia | Clay (red) | (Colombia) Eduardo Struvay | (Colombia) Alejandro Gómez (Colombia) Felipe Mantilla | 7–6^{(8–6)}, 6–7^{(5–7)}, [10–4] |
| Runner–up | 12. | 8 November 2015 | Bogotá, Colombia (2) | Clay | (Colombia) Eduardo Struvay | (Chile) Julio Peralta (Argentina) Horacio Zeballos | 3–6, 4–6 |
| Runner–up | 13. | 13 June 2016 | Perugia, Italy | Clay | (Brazil) Fabricio Neis | (Argentina) Andres Molteni (Brazil) Rogerio Dutra Silva | 5–7, 3–6 |
| Runner–up | 14. | 18 July 2016 | Gimcheon, South Korea | Hard | (Philippines) Ruben Gonzales | (Chinese Taipei) Hsieh Cheng-peng (Chinese Taipei) Yang Tsung-hua | w/o |
| Runner–up | 15. | 12 September 2016 | Nanchang, China | Hard | (Philippines) Ruben Gonzales | (China) Wu Di (China) Zhang Zhizhen | 6–7^{(4–7)}, 3–6 |
| Runner–up | 16. | 6 January 2020 | Ann Arbor, United States | Hard | (Colombia) Alejandro Gómez | (United States) Robert Galloway (Mexico) Hans Hach Verdugo | 6–4, 4–6, [8–10] |
| Winner | 17. | 1 May 2021 | Salinas, Ecuador | Hard | (Peru) Sergio Galdós | (Ecuador) Antonio Cayetano March (Argentina) Thiago Agustín Tirante | w/o |
| Winner | 18. | 6 June 2021 | Little Rock, United States | Hard | (United States) Ernesto Escobedo | (United States) Christopher Eubanks (Ecuador) Roberto Quiroz | 4–6, 6–3, [10–5] |
| Runner–up | 19. | 12 June 2021 | Orlando, United States | Hard | (United States) JC Aragone | (United States) Christian Harrison (Canada) Peter Polansky | 2–6, 3–6 |
| Runner-up | 19. | 19 June 2021 | M25 Tulsa, United States | Hard | (United States) JC Aragone | (United States) Strong Kirchheimer (Greece) Michail Pervolarakis | 1–6, 6–4, [7–10] |
| Runner–up | 20. | 31 July 2021 | El Espinar, Spain | Hard | (United States) JC Aragone | (United States) Robert Galloway (United States) Alex Lawson | 6–7^{(8–10)}, 4–6 |
| Runner–up | 21. | 2 October 2021 | Lima, Peru | Clay | (Brazil) Fernando Romboli | (Germany) Julian Lenz (Austria) Gerald Melzer | 6–7^{(4–7)}, 6–7^{(3–7)} |
| Runner–up | 22. | 23 October 2021 | Bogotá, Colombia | Clay | (Colombia) Alejandro Gómez | (Chile) Nicolás Jarry (Ecuador) Roberto Quiroz | 7–6^{(7–4)}, 5–7, [4–10] |
| Winner | 23. | 4 December 2021 | São Paulo, Brazil | Clay | (Colombia) Alejandro Gómez | (Brazil) Rafael Matos (Brazil) Felipe Meligeni Alves | w/o |
| Winner | 24. | 11 December 2021 | Florianópolis, Brazil | Clay | (Colombia) Alejandro Gómez | (Uruguay) Martín Cuevas (Brazil) Rafael Matos | 6–3, 6–3 |
| Runner–up | 25. | 26 March 2022 | Santa Cruz de la Sierra, Bolivia | Clay | (Mexico) Miguel Ángel Reyes-Varela | (Netherlands) Jesper de Jong (Netherlands) Bart Stevens | 4–6, 6–3, [6–10] |
| Winner | 26. | 16 April 2022 | San Luis Potosí, Mexico | Clay | (Mexico) Miguel Ángel Reyes-Varela | (Venezuela) Luis David Martínez (Brazil) Felipe Meligeni Alves | 7–6^{(13–11)}, 6–2 |
| Winner | 27. | 23 April 2022 | Aguascalientes, Mexico | Clay | (Mexico) Miguel Ángel Reyes-Varela | (Portugal) Gonçalo Oliveira (India) Divij Sharan | 7–5, 6–3 |
| Runner-up | 28. | 8 May 2022 | Aix-en-Provence, France | Clay | (Mexico) Miguel Ángel Reyes-Varela | (France) Titouan Droguet (France) Kyrian Jacquet | 2–6, 3–6 |
| Winner | 29. | 14 May 2022 | Heilbronn, Germany | Clay | (Mexico) Miguel Ángel Reyes-Varela | (Netherlands) Jelle Sels (Netherlands) Bart Stevens | 7–5, 6–3 |
| Winner | 30. | 21 May 2022 | Tunis, Tunisia | Clay | (Mexico) Miguel Ángel Reyes-Varela | (Austria) Alexander Erler (Austria) Lucas Miedler | 6–7^{(3–7)}, 6–3, [11–9] |
| Winner | 31. | 4 June 2022 | Forlì, Italy | Clay | (Mexico) Miguel Ángel Reyes-Varela | (France) Sadio Doumbia (France) Fabien Reboul | 7–5, 4–6, [10–4] |
| Runner-up | 32. | 16 July 2022 | Amersfoort, Netherlands | Clay | (Mexico) Miguel Ángel Reyes-Varela | (Netherlands) Robin Haase (Netherlands) Sem Verbeek | 4–6, 6–3, [7–10] |
| Runner-up | 33. | 20 August 2022 | Santo Domingo, Dominican Republic | Clay | (Mexico) Miguel Ángel Reyes-Varela | (Philippines) Ruben Gonzales (United States) Reese Stalder | 6–7^{(5–7)}, 3–6 |
| Winner | 34. | 5 October 2022 | Gwangju, South Korea | Hard | (Mexico) Miguel Ángel Reyes-Varela | (India) Yuki Bhambri (India) Saketh Myneni | 2–6, 6–3, [10–6] |
| Winner | 35. | 29 April 2023 | Rome, Italy | Clay | (Portugal) Francisco Cabral | (Kazakhstan) Andrey Golubev (Ukraine) Denys Molchanov | 6–3, 6–1 |
| Winner | 36. | 14 May 2023 | Francavilla al Mare, Italy | Clay | (Uruguay) Ariel Behar | (Netherlands) Sander Arends (Greece) Petros Tsitsipas | 7–6^{(7–1)}, 3–6, [10–6] |
| Winner | 37. | Jul 2023 | Iași, Romania | Clay | (Pakistan) Aisam-Ul-Haq Qureshi | (Romania) Gabi Adrian Boitan (Romania) Bogdan Pavel | 6–3, 6–3 |
| Runner-up | 38. | Nov 2023 | Lima, Peru | Clay | (Brazil) Orlando Luz | (Brazil) Mateus Alves (Brazil) Eduardo Ribeiro | 6–3, 5–7, [8–10] |
| Winner | 39. | Nov 2023 | Brasilia, Brazil | Clay | (Sweden) André Göransson | (Brazil) Marcelo Demoliner (Brazil) Rafael Matos | 7–6^{(7–3)}, 4–6, [11–9] |
| Runner-up | 40. | Jun 2024 | Surbiton, United Kingdom | Grass | (Ecuador) Diego Hidalgo | (United Kingdom) Julian Cash (United States) Robert Galloway | 4–6, 4–6 |
| Winner | 41. | Oct 2024 | Roanne, France | Hard (i) | (Netherlands) David Pel | (Switzerland) Jakub Paul (Czech Republic) Matěj Vocel | 4–6, 6–3, [10–6] |
| Winner | 42. | Oct 2024 | Brest, France | Hard (i) | (Tunisia) Skander Mansouri | (Switzerland) Jakub Paul (Czech Republic) Matěj Vocel | 7–5, 4–6, [10–5] |
| Winner | 43. | Nov 2024 | Bratislava, Slovakia | Hard (i) | (United Kingdom) Julian Cash | (Sweden) André Göransson (Netherlands) Sem Verbeek | 6–3, 6–4 |
| Runner-up | 44. | Jul 2025 | Porto, Portugal | Hard | (Belgium) Joran Vliegen | (United States) George Goldhoff (Chinese Taipei) Ray Ho | 4–6, 4–6 |
| Runner-up | 45. | Nov 2025 | Bogotá, Colombia | Clay | (United States) Benjamin Kittay | (Venezuela) Luis David Martínez (Colombia) Cristian Rodríguez | 1–6, 4–6 |
| Winner | 46. | Jan 2026 | Bangalore, India | Hard | (United States) Benjamin Kittay | (France) Arthur Reymond (France) Luca Sanchez | 7–6^{(11–9)}, 7–5 |
| Runner-up | 47. | Mar 2026 | Alicante, Spain | Clay | (Uruguay) Ariel Behar | (Poland) Szymon Kielan (Portugal) Tiago Pereira | 6–4, 3–6, [13–15] |
| Runner-up | 48. | Apr 2026 | Oeiras, Portugal | Clay | (Uruguay) Ariel Behar | (India) Sriram Balaji (Austria) Neil Oberleitner | 7–6^{(9–7)}, 4–6, [9–11] |
| Winner | 49. | Apr 2026 | Rome, Italy | Clay | (Uruguay) Ariel Behar | (Czech Republic) Miloš Karol (Czech Republic) Andrew Paulson | 7–6^{(7–4)}, 4–6, [10–7] |
| Winner | 50. | Sep 2026 | Sevilla, Spain | Clay | (Argentina) Mariano Kestelboim | (Spain) Íñigo Cervantes (Ukraine) Denys Molchanov | 7–6^{(7–3)}, 6–3 |

== ATP Challenger & ITF Futures ==
=== Singles: 10 (6–4) ===
Legend
ATP Challenger Tour (0–0)
ITF Futures (6–4)

| Outcome | No. | Date | Tournament | Surface | Opponent | Score |
|---|---|---|---|---|---|---|
| Winner | 1. | 5 December 2011 | F15 Futures Tehuacán | Hard | (Australia) Chris Letcher | 7–6^{(8–6)}, 7–6^{(7–1)} |
| Runner–up | 2. | 12 December 2011 | F16 Futures Guadalajara | Clay | (Mexico) César Ramírez | 6–2, 6–1 |
| Runner–up | 3. | 16 August 2012 | F1 Futures Bogotá | Clay | (Dominican Republic) Víctor Estrella Burgos | 7–5, 6–4 |
| Winner | 4. | 18 January 2013 | F2 Futures Tijuana | Hard | (France) Antoine Benneteau | 5–7, 6–3, 7–5 |
| Runner–up | 5. | 6 May 2013 | F1 Futures Guatemala City | Hard | (Colombia) Carlos Salamanca | 7–5, 6–2 |
| Winner | 6. | 26 Apr 2014 | F2 Futures Pereira | Clay | (Belgium) Arthur De Greef | 4–6, 6–3, 6–2 |
| Winner | 7. | 21 Sep 2014 | F6 Futures Armenia | Clay | (Dominican Republic) José Hernández | 6–4, 6–2 |
| Runner–up | 8. | 16 Nov 2014 | F7 Futures Manizales | Clay | (Colombia) Eduardo Struvay | 4–6, 7–6^{(7–3)}, 6–4 |
| Winner | 9. | 3 May 2015 | F1 Futures Mexico | Hard | (United States) Alexander Sarkissian | 5–7, 6–3, 6–4 |
| Winner | 10. | 9 August 2015 | Colombia Futures 7 | Clay | (Brazil) José Pereira | 1–6, 6–3, 6–4 |

=== Doubles: 18 (10–8) ===
Legend
ITF Futures (10–8)

| Result | W–L | Date | Tournament | Surface | Partner | Opponents | Score |
|---|---|---|---|---|---|---|---|
| Winner | 1. | 6 September 2010 | F1 Futures, Ecuador | Hard | (Colombia) Sebastián Serrano | (Ecuador) Julio César Campozano (Ecuador) Diego Hidalgo | 6–7^{(2–7)}, 7–6^{(7–5)}, [10–7] |
| Winner | 2. | 6 June 2011 | F6 Futures Puebla, Mexico | Hard | (Mexico) Manuel Sánchez | (Mexico) Daniel Garza (Mexico) Gustavo Loza | 6–3, 6–3 |
| Runner–up | 3. | 26 September 2011 | Futures F7 Barquisimeto, Venezuela | Hard | (Colombia) Sebastián Serrano | (United States) Maciek Sykut (United States) Denis Zivkovic | 6–3, 6–2 |
| Runner–up | 4. | 20 August 2011 | F2 Futures Medellín, Colombia | Clay | (Colombia) Michael Quintero | (Uruguay) Ariel Behar (Peru) Duilio Beretta | 2–1, Retired. |
| Winner | 5. | 4 February 2013 | F3 Futures Mexico City, Mexico | Hard | (Guatemala) Christopher Díaz Figueroa | (Moldova) Roman Borvanov (United States) Adam El Mihdawy | 7–5, 7–6 ^{(8–6)} |
| Runner–up | 6. | 13 May 2013 | F1 FuturesSanta Tecla, El Salvador | Hard | (Australia) Chris Letcher | (El Salvador) Marcelo Arévalo (United States) Vahid Mirzadeh | 6–4, 6–3 |
| Runner–up | 7. | 26 April 2014 | F2 Futures Pereira, Colombia | Clay | (Colombia) Eduardo Struvay | (Puerto Rico) Alex Llompart (Argentina) Mateo Nicolás Martínez | 6–3, 3–6, [6–10] |
| Winner | 8. | 13 September 2014 | F5 Futures Ibagué, Colombia | Clay | (South Africa) Dean O'Brien | (Brazil) Fabiano de Paula (Brazil) Marcelo Demoliner | 6–3, 5–7, [10–7] |
| Winner | 9. | 16 November 2014 | F7 Futures Manizales, Colombia | Clay | (Colombia) Eduardo Struvay | (Argentina) Mateo Nicolás Martínez (Argentina) Facundo Mena | 7–5, 2–6, [10–5] |
| Winner | 10. | 22 November 2014 | F8 Futures Popayán, Colombia | Hard | (Colombia) Eduardo Struvay | (Colombia) Felipe Mantilla (Bolivia) Federico Zeballos | 6–1, 3–6, [10–3] |
| Winner | 11. | 27 July 2015 | Colombia F6 Medellín | Clay | (Colombia) Eduardo Struvay | (Argentina) Facundo Mena (Chile) Jorge Montero | 6–3, 7–5 |
| Runner–up | 12. | 9 August 2015 | Colombia F7 Bucaramanga | Hard | (Colombia) Juan Montes | (Argentina) Facundo Mena (Chile) Jorge Montero | 2–6, 2–6 |
| Runner–up | 13. | 23 May 2016 | Romania F4 Bacau | Clay | (Ecuador) Emilio Gómez | (Germany) Andreas Mies (Germany) Oscar Otte | 3–6, 3–6 |
| Runner–up | 14. | 20 Jun 2016 | Spain F18 Palma del Rio | Hard | (Spain) Jaume Pla Malfeito | (Denmark) Frederik Nielsen (Republic of Ireland) David O'Hare | 4–6, 2–6 |
| Winner | 15. | 2 Dec 2019 | M15 Santa Marta, Colombia | Hard | (Colombia) Alejandro Gomez | (Colombia) Alejandro Hoyos (Colombia) Cayetano March | 6–3, 6–4 |
| Runner-up | 16. | 10 Feb 2020 | M25 Naples, United States | Clay | (Colombia) Cristian Rodríguez | (United States) Martin Damm (United States) Toby Kodat | 6–4, 4–6, [7–10] |
| Winner | 17. | 2 Mar 2020 | M25 Las Vegas, United States | Hard | (United States) Junior A. Ore | (United States) Nick Chappell (United States) Reese Stalder | 7–6^{(7–1)}, 6–3 |
| Winner | 18. | 17 May 2021 | M25 Pensacola, United States | Clay | (United States) JC Aragone | (Colombia) Alejandro Gómez (United States) Junior A. Ore | 6–2, 4–6, [10–6] |

== National representation ==
=== Pan American Games ===
==== Singles 1 (1 runner-up) ====
| Outcome | No. | Date | Tournament | Surface | Opponent | Score |
|---|---|---|---|---|---|---|
| Runner-up | 1. | 15 July 2015 | Toronto, Canada | Hard | (Argentina) Facundo Bagnis | 1–6, 2–6 |

=== Central American and Caribbean Games ===
==== Singles: 1 Bronze Medal Matches (1–0) ====
| Outcome | Year | Championship | Surface | Opponent | Score |
|---|---|---|---|---|---|
| Bronze | 2014 | Veracruz | Clay | (Mexico) Daniel Garza | 6–4, 6–2 |

=== South American Games ===
==== Doubles 1 (1 runner-up) ====
| Outcome | No. | Date | Tournament | Surface | Partner | Opponent | Score |
|---|---|---|---|---|---|---|---|
| Runner-up | 1. | 15 March 2014 | Santiago, Chile | Clay | (Colombia) Carlos Salamanca | (Argentina) Guido Andreozzi (Argentina) Facundo Bagnis | 6–7^{(5–7)}, 5–7 |
