= 2017 Monterrey Challenger – Doubles =

Doubles
- 2017 Monterrey Challenger

Final
- Champions: (United States) Christopher Eubanks (United States) Evan King
- Runners-up: (El Salvador) Marcelo Arévalo (Mexico) Miguel Ángel Reyes-Varela
- Score: 7–6^{(7–4)}, 6–3

Events
Singles	Doubles
← 2016 ·	Monterrey Challenger	· 2018 →

Evan King and Denis Kudla were the defending champions but only King chose to defend his title, partnering Christopher Eubanks. King successfully defended his title.

Eubanks and King won the title after defeating Marcelo Arévalo and Miguel Ángel Reyes-Varela 7–6^{(7–4)}, 6–3 in the final.

== Seeds ==
1. (Australia) Jarryd Chaplin / (Australia) Sam Groth (quarterfinals)
2. (United States) Austin Krajicek / (United States) Jackson Withrow (semifinals)
3. (El Salvador) Marcelo Arévalo / (Mexico) Miguel Ángel Reyes-Varela (final)
4. (United States) Dennis Novikov / (Ecuador) Roberto Quiroz (quarterfinals, withdrew)

== Draw ==
=== Key ===
- Q = Qualifier
- WC = Wild card
- LL = Lucky loser
- Alt = Alternate
- SE = Special exempt
- PR = Protected ranking
- ITF = ITF entry
- JE = Junior exempt
- w/o = Walkover
- r = Retired
- d = Defaulted
- SR = Special ranking

First round
1	(Australia) Jarryd Chaplin (Australia) S Groth	6	3	[10]
(Venezuela) LD Martínez (Spain) R Ortega Olmedo	3	6	[7]
WC	(Mexico) M Sánchez (Japan) K Uchida	6	7^{7}
Alt	(Brazil) E Dischinger (France) Yannick Thivant	1	6^{5}
4	(United States) D Novikov (Ecuador) R Quiroz	6	7
(Dominican Republic) V Estrella Burgos (Ecuador) E Gómez	3	5
WC	(Mexico) L Gómez (Dominican Republic) J Hernández-Fernández
(United States) C Eubanks (United States) E King	w/o
(Peru) S Galdós (Venezuela) R Maytín	6	6^{3}	[6]
(Germany) M Marterer (Austria) L Miedler	3	7^{7}	[10]
WC	(Brazil) Diego Matos (Mexico) A Ruiz-Rosales	2	3
3	(El Salvador) M Arévalo (Mexico) MÁ Reyes-Varela	6	6
(Germany) S Fanselow (Germany) M Moraing	w/o
(France) Thomas Bréchemier (France) Q Halys
(Israel) E Leshem (Zimbabwe) B Lock
2	(United States) A Krajicek (United States) J Withrow	w/o

Quarterfinals
1	(Australia) J Chaplin (Australia) S Groth	6^{5}	7^{7}	[9]
WC	(Mexico) M Sánchez (Japan) K Uchida	7^{7}	6^{4}	[11]
4	(United States) D Novikov (Ecuador) R Quiroz
(United States) C Eubanks (United States) E King	w/o
(Germany) M Marterer (Austria) L Miedler	4	3
3	(El Salvador) M Arévalo (Mexico) MÁ Reyes-Varela	6	6
(Germany) S Fanselow (Germany) M Moraing
2	(United States) A Krajicek (United States) J Withrow	w/o

Semifinals
WC	(Mexico) M Sánchez (Japan) K Uchida	3	4
(United States) C Eubanks (United States) E King	6	6
3	(El Salvador) M Arévalo (Mexico) MÁ Reyes-Varela	6	6
2	(United States) A Krajicek (United States) J Withrow	4	3

Final
(United States) C Eubanks (United States) E King	7^{7}	6
3	(El Salvador) M Arévalo (Mexico) MÁ Reyes-Varela	6^{4}	3
