= 2017 Monterrey Challenger – Singles =

Singles
- 2017 Monterrey Challenger

Final
- Champion: (Germany) Maximilian Marterer
- Runner-up: (United States) Bradley Klahn
- Score: 7–6^{(7–3)}, 7–6^{(8–6)}

Events
Singles	Doubles
← 2016 ·	Monterrey Challenger	· 2018 →

Ernesto Escobedo was the defending champion but lost in the first round to Mats Moraing.

Maximilian Marterer won the title after defeating Bradley Klahn 7–6^{(7–3)}, 7–6^{(8–6)} in the final.

== Seeds ==
1. (Dominican Republic) Víctor Estrella Burgos (quarterfinals)
2. (United States) Ernesto Escobedo (first round)
3. (France) Quentin Halys (semifinals)
4. (Germany) Maximilian Marterer (champion)
5. (Australia) Sam Groth (second round, retired)
6. (El Salvador) Marcelo Arévalo (second round)
7. (Chile) Christian Garín (quarterfinals)
8. (United States) Dennis Novikov (first round, retired)

== Draw ==
=== Key ===
- Q = Qualifier
- WC = Wild card
- LL = Lucky loser
- Alt = Alternate
- SE = Special exempt
- PR = Protected ranking
- ITF = ITF entry
- JE = Junior exempt
- w/o = Walkover
- r = Retired
- d = Defaulted
- SR = Special ranking

=== Finals ===
Semifinals
PR	(United States) Bradley Klahn	7	7^{7}
3	(France) Quentin Halys	5	6^{4}
4	(Germany) Maximilian Marterer	7^{7}	6
PR	(United States) Kevin King	6^{2}	3

Final
PR	(United States) Bradley Klahn	6^{3}	6^{6}
4	(Germany) Maximilian Marterer	7^{7}	7^{8}

=== Top half ===
First round
1	(Dominican Republic) V Estrella Burgos	6	7^{7}
WC	(Mexico) L Patiño	3	6^{3}
(Germany) S Fanselow	6	7
(United States) A Sarkissian	3	5
(Spain) R Ortega Olmedo	4	5
(United States) A Krajicek	6	7
PR	(United States) B Klahn	6	3	3
8	(United States) D Novikov	3	6	0^{r}
3	(France) Q Halys	6^{5}	6	6
(Dominican Republic) J Hernández-Fernández	7^{7}	4	2
(Austria) L Miedler	6	2	3
(Israel) E Leshem	3	6	6
Q	(Australia) A Vukic	6	6
Q	(Japan) K Uchida	4	4
(Colombia) A Falla	6^{3}	3
7	(Chile) C Garín	7^{7}	6

Second round
1	(Dominican Republic) V Estrella Burgos	7^{9}	7^{7}
(Germany) S Fanselow	6^{7}	6^{5}
(United States) A Krajicek	6	6^{4}	3
PR	(United States) B Klahn	4	7^{7}	6
3	(France) Q Halys	6	6
(Israel) E Leshem	3	3
Q	(Australia) A Vukic	6	3	6^{4}
7	(Chile) C Garín	4	6	7^{7}

Quarterfinals
1	(Dominican Republic) V Estrella Burgos	2	6	4
PR	(United States) B Klahn	6	4	6
3	(France) Q Halys	3	6	6
7	(Chile) C Garín	6	4	2

Semifinals
PR	(United States) B Klahn	7	7^{7}
3	(France) Q Halys	5	6^{4}

=== Bottom half ===
First round
5	(Australia) S Groth	7	7
WC	(Mexico) M Sánchez	5	5
(Germany) D Köpfer	7^{7}	2	6
(Ecuador) R Quiroz	6^{5}	6	4
Q	(United States) Jared Hiltzik	4	6^{4}
WC	(Mexico) L Gómez	6	7^{7}
Q	(Ecuador) E Gómez	1	1
4	(Germany) M Marterer	6	6
6	(El Salvador) M Arévalo	4	7^{7}	7^{7}
(United States) C Eubanks	6	6^{5}	6^{5}
WC	(Mexico) T Hank	7^{7}	4	2
PR	(United States) K King	6^{3}	6	6
(United States) E King	6	5
(Colombia) DE Galán	2	3^{r}
(Germany) M Moraing	6^{5}	6	6
2	(United States) E Escobedo	7^{7}	3	4

Second round
5	(Australia) S Groth	3	0^{r}
(Germany) D Köpfer	6	1
WC	(Mexico) L Gómez	2	4
4	(Germany) M Marterer	6	6
6	(El Salvador) M Arévalo	7^{7}	3	6^{3}
PR	(United States) K King	6^{5}	6	7^{7}
(United States) E King	4	7^{7}	1
(Germany) M Moraing	6	6^{3}	0^{r}

Quarterfinals
(Germany) D Köpfer	4	2
4	(Germany) M Marterer	6	6
PR	(United States) K King	7^{7}	7^{7}
(United States) E King	6^{5}	6^{4}

Semifinals
4	(Germany) M Marterer	7^{7}	6
PR	(United States) K King	6^{2}	3
