= 2019 Monterrey Challenger – Doubles =

Doubles
- 2019 Monterrey Challenger

Final
- Champions: (United States) Evan King (United States) Nathan Pasha
- Runners-up: (Mexico) Santiago González (Pakistan) Aisam-ul-Haq Qureshi
- Score: 7–5, 6–2

Events
Singles	Doubles
← 2018 ·	Monterrey Challenger	· 2020 →

Marcelo Arévalo and Jeevan Nedunchezhiyan were the defending champions but chose not to defend their title.

Evan King and Nathan Pasha won the title after defeating Santiago González and Aisam-ul-Haq Qureshi 7–5, 6–2 in the final.

== Seeds ==
1. (Mexico) Santiago González / (Pakistan) Aisam-ul-Haq Qureshi (final)
2. (United States) Nicholas Monroe / (Mexico) Miguel Ángel Reyes-Varela (first round)
3. (United States) Robert Galloway / (United States) Nathaniel Lammons (semifinals)
4. (Australia) Matt Reid / (Australia) John-Patrick Smith (semifinals)

== Draw ==
=== Key ===
- Q = Qualifier
- WC = Wild card
- LL = Lucky loser
- Alt = Alternate
- SE = Special exempt
- PR = Protected ranking
- ITF = ITF entry
- JE = Junior exempt
- w/o = Walkover
- r = Retired
- d = Defaulted
- SR = Special ranking

First round
1	(Mexico) S González (Pakistan) A-u-H Qureshi	6	7^{8}
(Italy) P Lorenzi (Ecuador) R Quiroz	3	6^{6}
Alt	(Ecuador) E Gómez (Mexico) L Patiño	6	6
(Germany) A Begemann (Venezuela) R Maytín	4	2
4	(Australia) M Reid (Australia) J-P Smith	6	6
WC	(Dominican Republic) V Estrella Burgos (Mexico) L Gómez	3	2
WC	(United States) E Escobedo (United States) JP Fruttero	6^{4}	6	[10]
(Mexico) H Hach Verdugo (Croatia) A Pavić	7^{7}	3	[12]
(United States) T Sandgren (United States) J Withrow	6	6
(Spain) M Granollers (United Kingdom) J Ward	4	2
(Sweden) A Göransson (Canada) A Shamasdin	4	5
3	(United States) R Galloway (United States) N Lammons	6	7
(United States) E King (United States) N Pasha	6	7^{7}
PR	(Philippines) T Huey (France) F Martin	2	6^{5}
WC	(Colombia) N Mejía (United States) E Nava	7	5	[10]
2	(United States) N Monroe (Mexico) MÁ Reyes-Varela	5	7	[8]

Quarterfinals
1	(Mexico) S González (Pakistan) A-u-H Qureshi	6	6
Alt	(Ecuador) E Gómez (Mexico) L Patiño	3	2
4	(Australia) M Reid (Australia) J-P Smith	6	6^{6}	[10]
(Mexico) H Hach Verdugo (Croatia) A Pavić	3	7^{8}	[5]
(United States) T Sandgren (United States) J Withrow	6^{5}	6^{5}
3	(United States) R Galloway (United States) N Lammons	7^{7}	7^{7}
(United States) E King (United States) N Pasha	2	6	[10]
WC	(Colombia) N Mejía (United States) E Nava	6	3	[7]

Semifinals
1	(Mexico) S González (Pakistan) A-u-H Qureshi	6	4	[10]
4	(Australia) M Reid (Australia) J-P Smith	3	6	[5]
3	(United States) R Galloway (United States) N Lammons	3	4
(United States) E King (United States) N Pasha	6	6

Final
1	(Mexico) S González (Pakistan) A-u-H Qureshi	5	2
(United States) E King (United States) N Pasha	7	6
