= 2023 Monterrey Challenger – Singles =

Singles
- 2023 Monterrey Challenger

Final
- Champion: (Portugal) Nuno Borges
- Runner-up: (Croatia) Borna Gojo
- Score: 6–4, 7–6^{(8–6)}

Events
Singles	Doubles
← 2022 ·	Monterrey Challenger	· 2024 →

Fernando Verdasco was the defending champion but chose not to defend his title.

Nuno Borges won the title after defeating Borna Gojo 6–4, 7–6^{(8–6)} in the final.

== Seeds ==
1. (France) Adrian Mannarino (first round)
2. (Ecuador) Emilio Gómez (second round)
3. (United States) Denis Kudla (quarterfinals)
4. (Germany) Daniel Altmaier (quarterfinals)
5. (United States) Christopher Eubanks (first round)
6. (Portugal) Nuno Borges (champion)
7. (Japan) Taro Daniel (second round)
8. (Japan) Yosuke Watanuki (semifinals)

== Draw ==
=== Key ===
- Q = Qualifier
- WC = Wild card
- LL = Lucky loser
- Alt = Alternate
- SE = Special exempt
- PR = Protected ranking
- ITF = ITF entry
- JE = Junior exempt
- w/o = Walkover
- r = Retired
- d = Defaulted
- SR = Special ranking

=== Finals ===
Semifinals
(Croatia) Borna Gojo	7^{7}	6
8	(Japan) Yosuke Watanuki	6^{5}	4
6	(Portugal) Nuno Borges	7^{7}	7^{7}
(United States) Mitchell Krueger	6^{3}	6^{3}

Final
(Croatia) Borna Gojo	4	6^{6}
6	(Portugal) Nuno Borges	6	7^{8}

=== Top half ===
First round
1	(France) A Mannarino	5	6^{4}
(United States) A Kovacevic	7	7^{7}
(Colombia) N Mejía	6	1	6
(Tunisia) S Mansouri	4	6	3
(Croatia) B Gojo	6	7^{7}
WC	(Mexico) R Pacheco Méndez	3	6^{3}
(United States) S Johnson	4	6	3
7	(Japan) T Daniel	6	3	6
3	(United States) D Kudla	6	6
(Italy) M Bellucci	2	4
Q	(United States) N Chappell	6	6
Q	(Costa Rica) J Flores	3	2
WC	(Mexico) E Escobedo	6	2	2
(France) B Paire	2	6	6
WC	(United States) James Van Deinse	0	1
8	(Japan) Y Watanuki	6	6

Second round
(United States) A Kovacevic	6	6
(Colombia) N Mejía	3	2
(Croatia) B Gojo	6	6
7	(Japan) T Daniel	2	4
3	(United States) D Kudla	6	6
Q	(United States) N Chappell	3	4
(France) B Paire	6^{2}	1
8	(Japan) Y Watanuki	7^{7}	6

Quarterfinals
(United States) A Kovacevic	6^{5}	6	2
(Croatia) B Gojo	7^{7}	3	6
3	(United States) D Kudla	6	6^{3}	2
8	(Japan) Y Watanuki	3	7^{7}	6

Semifinals
(Croatia) B Gojo	7^{7}	6
8	(Japan) Y Watanuki	6^{5}	4

=== Bottom half ===
First round
6	(Portugal) N Borges	6	6
PR	(United States) B Klahn	2	2
Q	(United States) E Zhu	7^{7}	5	6
(Chinese Taipei) T-l Wu	6^{2}	7	4
(Germany) M Marterer	6	6
(Portugal) G Elias	3	4
(United States) B Holt	6^{4}	3
4	(Germany) D Altmaier	7^{7}	6
5	(United States) C Eubanks	4	3
Q	(Argentina) G Andreozzi	6	6
(United States) M Krueger	6	5	6
(Canada) S Diez	4	7	4
Q	(Australia) B Tomic	7^{7}	6
(Argentina) JP Ficovich	6^{3}	1
Q	(Kazakhstan) D Yevseyev	6^{6}	4
2	(Ecuador) E Gómez	7^{8}	6

Second round
6	(Portugal) N Borges	6	6
Q	(United States) E Zhu	2	4
(Germany) M Marterer	6^{1}	3
4	(Germany) D Altmaier	7^{7}	6
Q	(Argentina) G Andreozzi	3	1^{r}
(United States) M Krueger	6	2
Q	(Australia) B Tomic	4	6	7^{7}
2	(Ecuador) E Gómez	6	4	6^{4}

Quarterfinals
6	(Portugal) N Borges	7^{7}	6
4	(Germany) D Altmaier	6^{2}	4
(United States) M Krueger	6	2
Q	(Australia) B Tomic	4	1^{r}

Semifinals
6	(Portugal) N Borges	7^{7}	7^{7}
(United States) M Krueger	6^{3}	6^{3}
