= 2015 Monterrey Challenger – Singles =

Singles
- 2015 Monterrey Challenger

Final
- Champion: (Netherlands) Thiemo de Bakker
- Runner-up: (Dominican Republic) Víctor Estrella Burgos
- Score: 7–6^{(7–1)}, 4–6, 6–3

Events
Singles	Doubles
← 1996 ·	Monterrey Challenger	· 2016 →

Thiemo de Bakker won the title, beating top seed Víctor Estrella Burgos 7–6^{(7–1)}, 4–6, 6–3

== Seeds ==
1. (Dominican Republic) Víctor Estrella Burgos (final)
2. (Italy) Paolo Lorenzi (semifinals)
3. (United States) Austin Krajicek (second round)
4. (United States) Bjorn Fratangelo (first round)
5. (Netherlands) Thiemo de Bakker (champion)
6. (United States) Dennis Novikov (quarterfinals)
7. (Spain) Jordi Samper Montaña (first round)
8. (Ecuador) Giovanni Lapentti (quarterfinals)

== Draw ==
=== Key ===
- Q = Qualifier
- WC = Wild card
- LL = Lucky loser
- Alt = Alternate
- ITF = ITF entry
- PR = Protected ranking
- SR = Special ranking
- SE = Special exempt
- JE = Junior exempt
- JR = Junior Accelerator Programme entrant
- CO = College Accelerator Programme entrant
- NG = Next Gen Accelerator Program entrant
- w/o = Walkover
- r = Retired
- d = Defaulted

=== Finals ===
Semifinals
1	(Dominican Republic) Víctor Estrella Burgos	6	6
Alt	(United States) Ernesto Escobedo	4	4
5	(Netherlands) Thiemo de Bakker	6	6
2	(Italy) Paolo Lorenzi	3	1

Final
1	(Dominican Republic) Víctor Estrella Burgos	6^{1}	6	3
5	(Netherlands) Thiemo de Bakker	7^{7}	4	6

=== Top half ===
First round
1	(Dominican Republic) V Estrella Burgos	6	6
Q	(Brazil) Alexandre Tsuchiya	4	3
(Brazil) J Pereira	6	7
WC	(Mexico) M Sánchez	3	5
(United States) D Baughman	4	6	1
WC	(Mexico) T Hank	6	3	6
WC	(Mexico) HH Verdugo	6^{4}	3
6	(United States) D Novikov	7^{7}	6
3	(United States) A Krajicek	6	6
(Brazil) F Romboli	3	3
Alt	(United States) E Escobedo	6^{6}	6	7
(United States) M Krueger	7^{8}	3	5
(Canada) P Bester	6^{4}	7	6
Q	(Mexico) Luis Eduardo Morfin	7^{7}	5	2
(Colombia) E Struvay	6^{1}	7^{7}	6
7	(Spain) J Samper Montaña	7^{7}	6^{2}	4

Second round
1	(Dominican Republic) V Estrella Burgos	6	1	6
(Brazil) J Pereira	4	6	2
WC	(Mexico) T Hank	6	5	3
6	(United States) D Novikov	4	7	6
3	(United States) A Krajicek	6^{5}	7^{7}	6^{5}
Alt	(United States) E Escobedo	7^{7}	6^{5}	7^{7}
(Canada) P Bester	4	3
(Colombia) E Struvay	6	6

Quarterfinals
1	(Dominican Republic) V Estrella Burgos	7	6^{6}	7^{7}
6	(United States) D Novikov	5	7^{8}	6^{3}
Alt	(United States) E Escobedo	7	4	7^{7}
(Colombia) E Struvay	5	6	6^{5}

Semifinals
1	(Dominican Republic) V Estrella Burgos	6	6
Alt	(United States) E Escobedo	4	4

=== Bottom half ===
First round
5	(Netherlands) T de Bakker	6	6
(Chinese Taipei) J Jung	4	0
Q	(Japan) K Uchida	3	6	6
(United States) A El Mihdawy	6	4	3
(El Salvador) M Arévalo	6	7
Q	(Mexico) L Patiño	3	5
WC	(United States) TH Fritz	6	6^{8}	6
4	(United States) B Fratangelo	1	7^{10}	3
8	(Ecuador) G Lapentti	6	6
(Argentina) T Lipovšek Puches	1	4
PR	(United States) Dennis Nevolo	7	6^{2}	1
(Colombia) N Barrientos	5	7^{7}	6
(Brazil) C Zampieri	3	6	0
(United States) K King	6	3	6
(United States) C Buchanan	4	1
2	(Italy) P Lorenzi	6	6

Second round
5	(Netherlands) T de Bakker	7^{7}	7^{7}
Q	(Japan) K Uchida	6^{4}	6^{3}
(El Salvador) M Arévalo	6^{4}	6^{3}
WC	(United States) TH Fritz	7^{7}	7^{7}
8	(Ecuador) G Lapentti	6	6
(Colombia) N Barrientos	4	2
(United States) K King	6^{3}	0
2	(Italy) P Lorenzi	7^{7}	6

Quarterfinals
5	(Netherlands) T de Bakker	6	7^{7}
WC	(United States) TH Fritz	4	6^{1}
8	(Ecuador) G Lapentti	3	1
2	(Italy) P Lorenzi	6	6

Semifinals
5	(Netherlands) T de Bakker	6	6
2	(Italy) P Lorenzi	3	1
