= 2017 Monterrey Challenger =

- Date: 2–8 October
- Edition: 8th
- Draw: 32S / 16D
- Surface: Hard
- Location: Monterrey, Mexico

Champions

Singles
- (Germany) Maximilian Marterer

Doubles
- (United States) Christopher Eubanks / (United States) Evan King
- Monterrey Challenger

The 2017 Monterrey Challenger was a professional tennis tournament played on hard courts. It was the eighth edition of the tournament which was part of the 2017 ATP Challenger Tour. It took place in Monterrey, Mexico from 2 to 8 October 2017.

== Singles main-draw entrants ==
=== Seeds ===
Country	Player	Rank^{1}	Seed
DOM	Víctor Estrella Burgos	82	1
USA	Ernesto Escobedo	90	2
FRA	Quentin Halys	124	3
GER	Maximilian Marterer	134	4
AUS	Sam Groth	173	5
ESA	Marcelo Arévalo	206	6
CHI	Christian Garín	207	7
USA	Dennis Novikov	209	8

- ^{1} Rankings are as of 25 September 2017.

=== Other entrants ===
The following players received wildcards into the singles main draw:

- (Mexico) Lucas Gómez
- (Mexico) Tigre Hank
- (Mexico) Luis Patiño
- (Mexico) Manuel Sánchez

The following players received entry into the singles main draw using protected rankings:

- (United States) Kevin King
- (United States) Bradley Klahn

The following players received entry from the qualifying draw:

- (Ecuador) Emilio Gómez
- (United States) Jared Hiltzik
- (Japan) Kaichi Uchida
- (Australia) Aleksandar Vukic

== Champions ==
=== Singles ===
- (Germany) Maximilian Marterer def. (United States) Bradley Klahn 7–6^{(7–3)}, 7–6^{(8–6)}.

=== Doubles ===
- (United States) Christopher Eubanks / (United States) Evan King def. (El Salvador) Marcelo Arévalo / (Mexico) Miguel Ángel Reyes-Varela 7–6^{(7–4)}, 6–3.
