= 2019 Monterrey Challenger – Singles =

Singles
- 2019 Monterrey Challenger

Final
- Champion: (Kazakhstan) Alexander Bublik
- Runner-up: (Ecuador) Emilio Gómez
- Score: 6–3, 6–2

Events
Singles	Doubles
- Monterrey Challenger

David Ferrer was the defending champion but chose not to defend his title.

Alexander Bublik won the title after defeating Emilio Gómez 6–3, 6–2 in the final.

== Seeds ==
All seeds receive a bye into the second round.

1. (United States) Tennys Sandgren (semifinals)
2. (United States) Bradley Klahn (quarterfinals)
3. (Spain) Feliciano López (quarterfinals)
4. (Norway) Casper Ruud (second round)
5. (Italy) Paolo Lorenzi (second round)
6. (Spain) Marcel Granollers (third round)
7. (Kazakhstan) Alexander Bublik (champion)
8. (Canada) Peter Polansky (quarterfinals)
9. (United States) Christopher Eubanks (third round)
10. (United States) Mitchell Krueger (third round)
11. (Ecuador) Roberto Quiroz (second round)
12. (United States) Marcos Giron (quarterfinals)
13. (United Kingdom) James Ward (second round)
14. (Germany) Dominik Köpfer (third round)
15. (Austria) Sebastian Ofner (third round)
16. (Barbados) Darian King (third round)

== Draw ==
Key

- Q = Qualifier
- WC = Wild card
- LL = Lucky loser
- Alt = Alternate
- ITF = ITF entry
- PR = Protected ranking
- SR = Special ranking
- SE = Special exempt
- JE = Junior exempt
- JR = Junior Accelerator Programme entrant
- CO = College Accelerator Programme entrant
- NG = Next Gen Accelerator Program entrant
- w/o = Walkover
- r = Retired
- d = Defaulted

=== Finals ===
Quarterfinals
1	(United States) Tennys Sandgren	6	6^{4}	6
12	(United States) Marcos Giron	1	7^{7}	0
3	(Spain) Feliciano López	6^{5}	3
7	(Kazakhstan) Alexander Bublik	7^{7}	6
8	(Canada) Peter Polansky	3	6^{5}
(Ecuador) Emilio Gómez	6	7^{7}
(United States) Donald Young	7	6
2	(United States) Bradley Klahn	5	4

Semifinals
1	(United States) Tennys Sandgren	6	2	6^{5}
7	(Kazakhstan) Alexander Bublik	2	6	7^{7}
(Ecuador) Emilio Gómez	2	6	6
(United States) Donald Young	6	3	4

Final
7	(Kazakhstan) Alexander Bublik	6	6
(Ecuador) Emilio Gómez	3	2

=== Top half ===
==== Section 1 ====
First round
(Argentina) R Olivo	6	7
(Japan) K Uchida	4	5
WC	(Colombia) N Mejía	4	6	3
(United States) E King	6	3	6
WC	(United States) E Nava	6	3	6
(Croatia) B Gojo	4	6	4
PR	(Poland) M Przysiężny	4	4
(Colombia) DE Galán	6	6

Second round
1	(United States) T Sandgren	4	7^{9}	6
(Argentina) R Olivo	6	6^{7}	2
(United States) E King	6	6^{3}	1
16	(Barbados) D King	4	7^{7}	6
12	(United States) M Giron	6	6
WC	(United States) E Nava	4	2
(Colombia) DE Galán	3	4
6	(Spain) M Granollers	6	6

Third round
1	(United States) T Sandgren	7^{7}	4	6
16	(Barbados) D King	6^{5}	6	2
12	(United States) M Giron	4	6	6
6	(Spain) M Granollers	6	3	4

Quarterfinals
1	(United States) T Sandgren	6	6^{4}	6
12	(United States) M Giron	1	7^{7}	0

==== Section 2 ====
First round
(Spain) C Gómez-Herrera	6	6
(United States) C Altamirano	1	4
(United States) JC Aragone	6	3	4
(Chile) MT Barrios Vera	3	6	6
(United States) E Escobedo	6^{5}	4
Q	(United States) K King	7^{7}	6
(Serbia) P Krstin	6	6
WC	(Mexico) L Gómez	0	3

Second round
3	(Spain) F López	7^{7}	6
(Spain) C Gómez-Herrera	6^{3}	4
(Chile) MT Barrios Vera	6^{2}	6^{4}
14	(Germany) D Köpfer	7^{7}	7^{7}
10	(United States) M Krueger	7^{8}	6
Q	(United States) K King	6^{6}	3
(Serbia) P Krstin	6	3	4
7	(Kazakhstan) A Bublik	1	6	6

Third round
3	(Spain) F López	7^{7}	6
14	(Germany) D Köpfer	6^{4}	2
10	(United States) M Krueger	6^{2}	3
7	(Kazakhstan) A Bublik	7^{7}	6

Quarterfinals
3	(Spain) F López	6^{5}	3
7	(Kazakhstan) A Bublik	7^{7}	6

=== Bottom half ===
==== Section 3 ====
First round
(United States) Roy Smith	6^{3}	4
WC	(Serbia) J Tipsarević	7^{7}	6
(Australia) J-P Smith	6	6
WC	(Mexico) M Sánchez	4	2
(Ecuador) G Escobar	2	6	5
(Croatia) A Pavić	6	2	7
(Argentina) A Collarini	5	2
(Ecuador) E Gómez	7	6

Second round
8	(Canada) P Polansky	6	6
WC	(Serbia) J Tipsarević	3	2
(Australia) J-P Smith	3	7^{7}	5
9	(United States) C Eubanks	6	6^{3}	7
13	(United Kingdom) J Ward	5	6^{3}
(Croatia) A Pavić	7	7^{7}
(Ecuador) E Gómez	6	6
4	(Norway) C Ruud	2	4

Third round
8	(Canada) P Polansky	7^{7}	7^{7}
9	(United States) C Eubanks	6^{3}	6^{4}
(Croatia) A Pavić	1	0
(Ecuador) E Gómez	6	6

Quarterfinals
8	(Canada) P Polansky	3	6^{5}
(Ecuador) E Gómez	6	7^{7}

==== Section 4 ====
First round
(United States) D Young	6	6
(Spain) R Ortega Olmedo	4	4
(Dominican Republic) R Cid Subervi	6^{4}	3
(Colombia) S Giraldo	7^{7}	6
LL	(Mexico) L Patiño	1	6	1
(Dominican Republic) V Estrella Burgos	6	3	6
(United States) Evan Song	2	6	6
Q	(Argentina) MF Descotte	6	3	0

Second round
5	(Italy) P Lorenzi	4	3
(United States) D Young	6	6
(Colombia) S Giraldo	3	7	7^{7}
11	(Ecuador) R Quiroz	6	5	6^{1}
15	(Austria) S Ofner	7^{7}	1	6
(Dominican Republic) V Estrella Burgos	6^{3}	6	4
(United States) E Song	4	3
2	(United States) B Klahn	6	6

Third round
(United States) D Young	6	6
(Colombia) S Giraldo	3	4
15	(Austria) S Ofner	3	3
2	(United States) B Klahn	6	6

Quarterfinals
(United States) D Young	7	6
2	(United States) B Klahn	5	4
