= 2019 Monterrey Challenger =

- Date: 1–7 April
- Edition: 10th
- Draw: 48S / 16D
- Surface: Hard
- Location: Monterrey, Mexico

Champions

Singles
- (Kazakhstan) Alexander Bublik

Doubles
- (United States) Evan King / (United States) Nathan Pasha
← 2018 ·	Monterrey Challenger	· 2020 →

The 2019 Monterrey Challenger was a professional tennis tournament played on hard courts. It was the tenth edition of the tournament which was part of the 2019 ATP Challenger Tour. It took place in Monterrey, Mexico from 1 to 7 April 2019.

== Singles main-draw entrants ==
=== Seeds ===
Country	Player	Rank^{1}	Seed
USA	Tennys Sandgren	91	1
USA	Bradley Klahn	93	2
ESP	Feliciano López	94	3
NOR	Casper Ruud	98	4
ITA	Paolo Lorenzi	107	5
ESP	Marcel Granollers	111	6
KAZ	Alexander Bublik	131	7
CAN	Peter Polansky	138	8
USA	Christopher Eubanks	150	9
USA	Mitchell Krueger	170	10
ECU	Roberto Quiroz	172	11
USA	Marcos Giron	173	12
GBR	James Ward	177	13
GER	Dominik Köpfer	182	14
AUT	Sebastian Ofner	184	15
BAR	Darian King	191	16

- ^{1} Rankings are as of 18 March 2019.

=== Other entrants ===
The following players received wildcards into the singles main draw:

- (Mexico) Lucas Gómez
- (Colombia) Nicolás Mejía
- (United States) Emilio Nava
- (Mexico) Manuel Sánchez
- (Serbia) Janko Tipsarević

The following player received entry into the singles main draw using a protected ranking:

- (Poland) Michał Przysiężny

The following players received entry from the qualifying draw:

- (Argentina) Matías Franco Descotte
- (United States) Kevin King

The following player received entry as a lucky loser:

- (Mexico) Luis Patiño

== Champions ==
=== Singles ===
- (Kazakhstan) Alexander Bublik def. (Ecuador) Emilio Gómez 6–3, 6–2.

=== Doubles ===
- (United States) Evan King / (United States) Nathan Pasha def. (Mexico) Santiago González / (Pakistan) Aisam-ul-Haq Qureshi 7–5, 6–2.
