= 2023 Monterrey Challenger – Doubles =

Doubles
- 2023 Monterrey Challenger

Final
- Champions: (Sweden) André Göransson (Japan) Ben McLachlan
- Runners-up: (Venezuela) Luis David Martínez (Colombia) Cristian Rodríguez
- Score: 6–3, 6–4

Events
Singles	Doubles
← 2022 ·	Monterrey Challenger	· 2024 →

Hans Hach Verdugo and Austin Krajicek were the defending champions, but only Hach Verdugo chose to defend his title, partnering Miguel Ángel Reyes-Varela. Hach Verdugo lost in the semifinals to André Göransson and Ben McLachlan.

Göransson and McLachlan won the title after defeating Luis David Martínez and Cristian Rodríguez 6–3, 6–4 in the final.

== Seeds ==
1. (Sweden) André Göransson / (Japan) Ben McLachlan (champions)
2. (Argentina) Guido Andreozzi / (Argentina) Guillermo Durán (quarterfinals)
3. (Mexico) Hans Hach Verdugo / (Mexico) Miguel Ángel Reyes-Varela (semifinals)
4. (Serbia) Ivan Sabanov / (Serbia) Matej Sabanov (quarterfinals)

== Draw ==
=== Key ===
- Q = Qualifier
- WC = Wild card
- LL = Lucky loser
- Alt = Alternate
- SE = Special exempt
- PR = Protected ranking
- ITF = ITF entry
- JE = Junior exempt
- w/o = Walkover
- r = Retired
- d = Defaulted
- SR = Special ranking

First round
1	(Sweden) A Göransson (Japan) B McLachlan	6	6
WC	(Mexico) E Escobedo (Mexico) R Pacheco Méndez	4	4
(Germany) M Marterer (France) B Paire	6	3	[10]
(Philippines) R Gonzales (United States) R Stalder	4	6	[4]
3	(Mexico) H Hach Verdugo (Mexico) MÁ Reyes-Varela	6	6
(Argentina) JP Ficovich (Colombia) N Mejía	4	4
WC	(Mexico) Emiliano Aguilera (United States) James Van Deinse	5	0
(New Zealand) R Statham (Kazakhstan) D Yevseyev	7	6
(Croatia) B Gojo (Tunisia) S Mansouri	6	5	[7]
(United States) E King (United States) M Krueger	3	7	[10]
PR	(United States) B Klahn (United States) A Kovacevic	5	6	[11]
4	(Serbia) I Sabanov (Serbia) M Sabanov	7	4	[13]
(Bolivia) B Arias (Bolivia) F Zeballos	2	4
(Venezuela) LD Martínez (Colombia) C Rodríguez	6	6
(United States) A Lawson (New Zealand) A Sitak	3	3
2	(Argentina) G Andreozzi (Argentina) G Durán	6	6

Quarterfinals
1	(Sweden) A Göransson (Japan) B McLachlan	6	6
(Germany) M Marterer (France) B Paire	3	3
3	(Mexico) H Hach Verdugo (Mexico) MÁ Reyes-Varela	6^{1}	7	[10]
(New Zealand) R Statham (Kazakhstan) D Yevseyev	7^{7}	5	[5]
(United States) E King (United States) M Krueger	6	7^{7}
4	(Serbia) I Sabanov (Serbia) M Sabanov	3	6^{5}
(Venezuela) LD Martínez (Colombia) C Rodríguez	7	6
2	(Argentina) G Andreozzi (Argentina) G Durán	5	3

Semifinals
1	(Sweden) A Göransson (Japan) B McLachlan	7^{7}	7^{7}
3	(Mexico) H Hach Verdugo (Mexico) MÁ Reyes-Varela	6^{5}	6^{5}
(United States) E King (United States) M Krueger	6^{5}	3
(Venezuela) LD Martínez (Colombia) C Rodríguez	7^{7}	6

Final
1	(Sweden) A Göransson (Japan) B McLachlan	6	6
(Venezuela) LD Martínez (Colombia) C Rodríguez	3	4
