= 2023 Monterrey Challenger =

- Date: 20–26 February
- Edition: 13th
- Surface: Hard
- Location: Monterrey, Mexico

Champions

Singles
- (Portugal) Nuno Borges

Doubles
- (Sweden) André Göransson / (Japan) Ben McLachlan
← 2022 ·	Monterrey Challenger	· 2024 →

The 2023 Monterrey Challenger was a professional tennis tournament played on hard courts. It was the thirteenth edition of the tournament which was part of the 2023 ATP Challenger Tour. It took place in Monterrey, Mexico from 20 to 26 February 2023.

== Singles main draw entrants ==
=== Seeds ===
Country	Player	Rank^{1}	Seed
FRA	Adrian Mannarino	59	1
ECU	Emilio Gómez	94	2
USA	Denis Kudla	95	3
GER	Daniel Altmaier	97	4
USA	Christopher Eubanks	102	5
POR	Nuno Borges	104	6
JPN	Taro Daniel	106	7
JPN	Yosuke Watanuki	112	8

- ^{1} Rankings are as of 13 February 2023.

=== Other entrants ===
The following players received wildcards into the singles main draw:

- (Mexico) Ernesto Escobedo
- (Mexico) Rodrigo Pacheco Méndez
- (United States) James Van Deinse

The following player received entry into the singles main draw using a protected ranking:

- (United States) Bradley Klahn

The following players received entry from the qualifying draw:

- (Argentina) Guido Andreozzi
- (United States) Nick Chappell
- (Costa Rica) Jesse Flores
- (Australia) Bernard Tomic
- (Kazakhstan) Denis Yevseyev
- (United States) Evan Zhu

== Champions ==
=== Singles ===
- (Portugal) Nuno Borges def. (Croatia) Borna Gojo 6–4, 7–6^{(8–6)}.

=== Doubles ===
- (Sweden) André Göransson / (Japan) Ben McLachlan def. (Venezuela) Luis David Martínez / (Colombia) Cristian Rodríguez 6–3, 6–4.
