= 2015 Monterrey Challenger – Doubles =

Doubles
- 2015 Monterrey Challenger

Final
- Champions: (Netherlands) Thiemo de Bakker (Netherlands) Mark Vervoort
- Runners-up: (Italy) Paolo Lorenzi (Brazil) Fernando Romboli
- Score: Walkover

Events
Singles	Doubles
← 1996 ·	Monterrey Challenger	· 2016 →

Thiemo de Bakker and Mark Vervoort won the title, by beating Paolo Lorenzi and Fernando Romboli by a walkover.

== Seeds ==
1. (Germany) Gero Kretschmer / (Germany) Alexander Satschko (quarterfinals)
2. (Mexico) César Ramírez / (Mexico) Miguel Ángel Reyes-Varela (first round)
3. (South Africa) Dean O'Brien / (South Africa) Ruan Roelofse (quarterfinals)
4. (United States) Kevin King / (United States) Austin Krajicek (quarterfinals)

== Draw ==
=== Key ===
- Q = Qualifier
- WC = Wild card
- LL = Lucky loser
- Alt = Alternate
- SE = Special exempt
- PR = Protected ranking
- ITF = ITF entry
- JE = Junior exempt
- w/o = Walkover
- r = Retired
- d = Defaulted
- SR = Special ranking

=== Draw ===
First round
1	(Germany) G Kretschmer (Germany) A Satschko	6	7^{7}
(United States) C Buchanan (United States) D Novikov	3	6^{5}
(Italy) P Lorenzi (Brazil) F Romboli	6	6
WC	(Mexico) Cesar Antonio Gomez Diaz (Mexico) T Hank	2	4
4	(United States) K King (United States) A Krajicek	7	6
(Colombia) N Barrientos (Colombia) E Struvay	5	1
WC	(Mexico) Mauricio Astorga (Mexico) D Garza	6	4	[10]
WC	(Mexico) L Patiño (Mexico) M Sánchez	3	6	[1]
(United States) M Krueger (United Kingdom) D Walsh	4	7	[10]
(Canada) P Bester (Mexico) H Hach Verdugo	6	5	[8]
(Ecuador) G Lapentti (Germany) F Moser	6	4	[7]
3	(South Africa) D O'Brien (South Africa) R Roelofse	4	6	[10]
(Uruguay) A Behar (Philippines) R Gonzales	4	6	[3]
(El Salvador) M Arévalo (Brazil) C Zampieri	6	4	[10]
(Netherlands) T de Bakker (Netherlands) M Vervoort	4	6	[17]
2	(Mexico) C Ramírez (Mexico) M Á Reyes-Varela	6	4	[15]

Quarterfinals
1	(Germany) G Kretschmer (Germany) A Satschko	2	3
(Italy) P Lorenzi (Brazil) F Romboli	6	6
4	(United States) K King (United States) A Krajicek	6^{6}	6	[7]
WC	(Mexico) Mauricio Astorga (Mexico) D Garza	7^{8}	4	[10]
(United States) M Krueger (United Kingdom) D Walsh	7	6
3	(South Africa) D O'Brien (South Africa) R Roelofse	5	4
(El Salvador) M Arévalo (Brazil) C Zampieri	2	6	[8]
(Netherlands) T de Bakker (Netherlands) M Vervoort	6	2	[10]

Semifinals
(Italy) P Lorenzi (Brazil) F Romboli	6	6
WC	(Mexico) Mauricio Astorga (Mexico) D Garza	4	3
(United States) M Krueger (United Kingdom) D Walsh	2	3
(Netherlands) T de Bakker (Netherlands) M Vervoort	6	6

Final
(Italy) P Lorenzi (Brazil) F Romboli
(Netherlands) T de Bakker (Netherlands) M Vervoort	w/o
