= 2018 Monterrey Challenger – Singles =

Singles
- 2018 Monterrey Challenger

Final
- Champion: (Spain) David Ferrer
- Runner-up: (Croatia) Ivo Karlović
- Score: 6–3, 6–4

Events
Singles	Doubles
- Monterrey Challenger

Maximilian Marterer was the defending champion but chose not to defend his title.

David Ferrer won the title after defeating Ivo Karlović 6–3, 6–4 in the final.

== Seeds ==
1. (Spain) Marcel Granollers (quarterfinals)
2. (United States) Michael Mmoh (withdrew)
3. (Italy) Paolo Lorenzi (first round)
4. (Spain) Adrián Menéndez Maceiras (first round)
5. (Croatia) Ivo Karlović (final)
6. (Spain) David Ferrer (champion)
7. (Austria) Gerald Melzer (quarterfinals)
8. (Spain) Pedro Martínez (second round)

== Draw ==
Key

- Q = Qualifier
- WC = Wild card
- LL = Lucky loser
- Alt = Alternate
- ITF = ITF entry
- PR = Protected ranking
- SR = Special ranking
- SE = Special exempt
- JE = Junior exempt
- JR = Junior Accelerator Programme entrant
- CO = College Accelerator Programme entrant
- NG = Next Gen Accelerator Program entrant
- w/o = Walkover
- r = Retired
- d = Defaulted

=== Finals ===
Semifinals
(United States) Ernesto Escobedo
6	(Spain) David Ferrer	w/o
5	(Croatia) Ivo Karlović	6^{6}	6	7^{7}
PR	(Colombia) Santiago Giraldo	7^{8}	4	6^{3}

Final
6	(Spain) David Ferrer	6	6
5	(Croatia) Ivo Karlović	3	4

=== Top half ===
First round
1	(Spain) M Granollers	6	6
Q	(United States) Harrison Adams	4	4
(Ecuador) R Quiroz	6^{8}	6	7
(El Salvador) M Arévalo	7^{10}	3	5
(Hungary) M Valkusz	0	3
(United States) E Escobedo	6	6
(Serbia) P Krstin	6	6^{4}	3
8	(Spain) P Martínez	1	7^{7}	6
3	(Italy) P Lorenzi	5	3
WC	(Austria) J Melzer	7	6
(Austria) S Ofner	6	6
(Spain) M Vilella Martínez	1	2
(United States) K King	4	6	4
(Dominican Republic) R Cid Subervi	6	2	6
(Australia) T Kokkinakis	1	3
6	(Spain) D Ferrer	6	6

Second round
1	(Spain) M Granollers	6^{5}	7^{7}	7
(Ecuador) R Quiroz	7^{7}	6^{3}	5
(United States) E Escobedo	5	6	6
8	(Spain) P Martínez	7	4	3
WC	(Austria) J Melzer	6	6^{4}	3
(Austria) S Ofner	3	7^{7}	6
(Dominican Republic) R Cid Subervi	2	7^{7}	2
6	(Spain) D Ferrer	6	6^{4}	6

Quarterfinals
1	(Spain) M Granollers	6^{5}	6^{4}
(United States) E Escobedo	7^{7}	7^{7}
(Austria) S Ofner	3	4
6	(Spain) D Ferrer	6	6

Semifinals
(United States) E Escobedo
6	(Spain) D Ferrer	w/o

=== Bottom half ===
First round
5	(Croatia) I Karlović	7^{8}	7
(Netherlands) T de Bakker	6^{6}	5
(United States) S Kozlov	2	4
WC	(Mexico) L Gómez	6	6
(United States) B Fratangelo	6	6
WC	(Mexico) G López Villaseñor	3	2
Q	(Hungary) Z Piros	6	5	7^{7}
4	(Spain) A Menéndez Maceiras	1	7	6^{4}
7	(Austria) G Melzer	7	6
(United States) E King	5	3
(Croatia) N Serdarušić	6	6
WC	(Dominican Republic) V Estrella Burgos	3	1
Q	(Canada) Pavel Krainik	4	4
PR	(Colombia) S Giraldo	6	6
Q	(Ecuador) G Escobar	6	6
LL	(United States) S Bangoura	4	3

Second round
5	(Croatia) I Karlović	3	6	7^{7}
WC	(Mexico) L Gómez	6	3	6^{4}
(United States) B Fratangelo	6	6
Q	(Hungary) Z Piros	1	2
7	(Austria) G Melzer	7^{7}	4	6
(Croatia) N Serdarušić	6^{4}	6	3
PR	(Colombia) S Giraldo	4	6	6
Q	(Ecuador) G Escobar	6	2	4

Quarterfinals
5	(Croatia) I Karlović	6	6
(United States) B Fratangelo	4	3
7	(Austria) G Melzer	7^{7}	5	3
PR	(Colombia) S Giraldo	6^{5}	7	6

Semifinals
5	(Croatia) I Karlović	6^{6}	6	7^{7}
PR	(Colombia) S Giraldo	7^{8}	4	6^{3}
