= 2015 Monterrey Challenger =

- Date: 26–31 October
- Edition: 6th
- Draw: 32S / 16D
- Prize money: $100,000
- Surface: Hard
- Location: Monterrey, Mexico

Champions

Singles
- (Netherlands) Thiemo de Bakker

Doubles
- (Netherlands) Thiemo de Bakker / (Netherlands) Mark Vervoort
← 1996 ·	Monterrey Challenger	· 2016 →

The 2015 Monterrey Challenger was a professional tennis tournament played on hard courts. It was the sixth edition of the tournament which was part of the 2015 ATP Challenger Tour. It took place in Monterrey, Mexico from 26 to 31 of October 2015.

== Singles main-draw entrants ==
=== Seeds ===
Country	Player	Rank^{1}	Seed
DOM	Víctor Estrella Burgos	64	1
ITA	Paolo Lorenzi	71	2
USA	Austin Krajicek	96	3
USA	Bjorn Fratangelo	129	4
NED	Thiemo de Bakker	141	5
USA	Dennis Novikov	147	6
ESP	Jordi Samper-Montaña	185	7
ECU	Giovanni Lapentti	213	8

- ^{1} Rankings are as of October 19, 2015.

=== Other entrants ===
The following players received wildcards into the singles main draw:

- (United States) Taylor Harry Fritz
- (Mexico) Tigre Hank
- (Mexico) Manuel Sánchez
- (Mexico) Hans Hach Verdugo

The following player entered the singles main draw with a protected ranking:

- (United States) Dennis Nevolo

The following player entered the main draw as an alternate:

- (United States) Ernesto Escobedo

The following players received entry from the qualifying draw:

- (Mexico) Luis Eduardo Morfin Friebel
- (Mexico) Luis Patiño
- (Brazil) Alexandre Tsuchiya
- (Japan) Kaichi Uchida

== Champions ==
=== Singles ===
- (Netherlands) Thiemo de Bakker def. (Dominican Republic) Víctor Estrella Burgos 7–6^{(7–1)}, 4–6, 6–3

=== Doubles ===
- (Netherlands) Thiemo de Bakker / (Netherlands) Mark Vervoort def. (Italy) Paolo Lorenzi / (Brazil) Fernando Romboli by walkover.
