= 2016 Monterrey Challenger =

- Date: 10–15 October
- Edition: 7th
- Draw: 32S / 16D
- Prize money: $100,000
- Surface: Hard
- Location: Monterrey, Mexico

Champions

Singles
- (United States) Ernesto Escobedo

Doubles
- (United States) Evan King / (United States) Denis Kudla
- Monterrey Challenger

The 2016 Monterrey Challenger was a professional tennis tournament played on hard courts. It was the seventh edition of the tournament which was part of the 2016 ATP Challenger Tour. It took place in Monterrey, Mexico from 10 to 15 of October 2016. The singles champion was Ernesto Escobedo.

== Singles main-draw entrants ==
=== Seeds ===
Country	Player	Rank^{1}	Seed
DOM	Víctor Estrella Burgos	82	1
GER	Benjamin Becker	105	2
USA	Denis Kudla	141	3
ARG	Marco Trungelliti	153	4
USA	Ernesto Escobedo	160	5
CAN	Peter Polansky	161	6
COL	Eduardo Struvay	186	7
COL	Alejandro González	189	8

- ^{1} Rankings are as of October 3, 2016.

=== Other entrants ===
The following players received wildcards into the singles main draw:

- (Argentina) Marco Trungelliti
- (Mexico) Lucas Gómez
- (Mexico) Mauricio Astorga
- (Mexico) Daniel Garza

The following players entered the main draw as alternates:

- (South Africa) Nicolaas Scholtz
- (Japan) Kaichi Uchida

The following players received entry from the qualifying draw:

- (Spain) Juan Lizariturry
- (South Africa) Tucker Vorster
- (Philippines) Ruben Gonzales
- (Ecuador) Gonzalo Escobar

== Champions ==
=== Singles ===
- (United States) Ernesto Escobedo def. (United States) Denis Kudla, 6–4, 6–4.

=== Doubles ===
- (United States) Evan King / (United States) Denis Kudla def. (Australia) Jarryd Chaplin / (Australia) Ben McLachlan, 7–5 6–2.
