= 2016 Monterrey Challenger – Doubles =

Doubles
- 2016 Monterrey Challenger

Final
- Champions: (United States) Evan King (United States) Denis Kudla
- Runners-up: (Australia) Jarryd Chaplin (New Zealand) Ben McLachlan
- Score: 6–7^{(4–7)}, 6–4, [10–2]

Events
Singles	Doubles
- Monterrey Challenger

Thiemo de Bakker and Mark Vervoort were the defending champions but chose not to defend their title.

Evan King and Denis Kudla won the title after defeating Jarryd Chaplin and Ben McLachlan 6–7^{(4–7)}, 6–4, [10–2] in the final.

== Seeds ==
1. (Australia) Matt Reid / (Australia) John-Patrick Smith (quarterfinals)
2. (Canada) Philip Bester / (Canada) Peter Polansky (first round)
3. (El Salvador) Marcelo Arévalo / (Brazil) Caio Zampieri (quarterfinals)
4. (United States) John Paul Fruttero / (Australia) Sam Groth (quarterfinals)

== Draw ==
Key

- Q = Qualifier
- WC = Wild card
- LL = Lucky loser
- Alt = Alternate
- ITF = ITF entry
- PR = Protected ranking
- SR = Special ranking
- SE = Special exempt
- JE = Junior exempt
- JR = Junior Accelerator Programme entrant
- CO = College Accelerator Programme entrant
- NG = Next Gen Accelerator Program entrant
- w/o = Walkover
- r = Retired
- d = Defaulted

First round
1	(Australia) M Reid (Australia) J-P Smith	6	6
Alt	(South Africa) N Scholtz (South Africa) T Vorster	4	4
(Ecuador) E Gómez (Ecuador) R Quiroz	6	6
(Brazil) G Clezar (Colombia) A González	2	2
4	(United States) JP Fruttero (Australia) S Groth	7^{7}	6
(United States) A El Mihdawy (Spain) R Ortega Olmedo	6^{5}	4
(Ecuador) G Escobar (Argentina) M Trungelliti	7^{7}	3	[6]
(United States) E King (United States) D Kudla	6^{5}	6	[10]
WC	(Mexico) César Antonio Gómez Díaz (Mexico) Ricardo Ortíz	1	1
(Australia) Jarryd Chaplin (New Zealand) B McLachlan	6	6
WC	(Mexico) Mauricio Astorga (Mexico) L Gómez	5	4
3	(El Salvador) M Arévalo (Brazil) C Zampieri	7	6
(Philippines) R Gonzales (Venezuela) LD Martínez	4	4
WC	(Mexico) D Garza (Japan) K Uchida	6	6
(Colombia) A Falla (Colombia) E Struvay	7^{7}	6
2	(Canada) P Bester (Canada) P Polansky	6^{1}	1

Quarterfinals
1	(Australia) M Reid (Australia) J-P Smith	3	7	[8]
(Ecuador) E Gómez (Ecuador) R Quiroz	6	5	[10]
4	(United States) JP Fruttero (Australia) S Groth	7^{12}	6^{3}	[7]
(United States) E King (United States) D Kudla	6^{10}	7^{7}	[10]
(Australia) J Chaplin (New Zealand) B McLachlan	4	7	[10]
3	(El Salvador) M Arévalo (Brazil) C Zampieri	6	5	[8]
WC	(Mexico) D Garza (Japan) K Uchida	1	1
(Colombia) A Falla (Colombia) E Struvay	6	6

Semifinals
(Ecuador) E Gómez (Ecuador) R Quiroz	6^{5}	6^{3}
(United States) E King (United States) D Kudla	7^{7}	7^{7}
(Australia) J Chaplin (New Zealand) B McLachlan	2	6	[11]
(Colombia) A Falla (Colombia) E Struvay	6	3	[9]

Final
(United States) E King (United States) D Kudla	6^{4}	6	[10]
(Australia) J Chaplin (New Zealand) B McLachlan	7^{7}	4	[2]
