= 2022 Monterrey Challenger – Singles =

Singles
- 2022 Monterrey Challenger

Final
- Champion: (Spain) Fernando Verdasco
- Runner-up: (India) Prajnesh Gunneswaran
- Score: 4–6, 6–3, 7–6^{(7–3)}

Events
Singles	Doubles
← 2020 ·	Monterrey Challenger	· 2023 →

Adrian Mannarino was the defending champion but chose not to defend his title.

Fernando Verdasco won the title after defeating Prajnesh Gunneswaran 4–6, 6–3, 7–6^{(7–3)} in the final.

== Seeds ==
1. (Spain) Fernando Verdasco (champion)
2. (United Kingdom) Jay Clarke (second round)
3. (Chinese Taipei) Jason Jung (quarterfinals)
4. (Germany) Cedrik-Marcel Stebe (first round)
5. (Argentina) Juan Pablo Ficovich (second round)
6. (France) Maxime Janvier (first round)
7. (India) Prajnesh Gunneswaran (final)
8. (France) Geoffrey Blancaneaux (quarterfinals)

== Draw ==
=== Key ===
- Q = Qualifier
- WC = Wild card
- LL = Lucky loser
- Alt = Alternate
- SE = Special exempt
- PR = Protected ranking
- ITF = ITF entry
- JE = Junior exempt
- w/o = Walkover
- r = Retired
- d = Defaulted
- SR = Special ranking

=== Finals ===
Semifinals
1	(Spain) Fernando Verdasco	4	6	6
(United States) Christian Harrison	6	4	2
7	(India) Prajnesh Gunneswaran	6^{7}	7^{7}	6
PR	(Japan) Go Soeda	7^{9}	6^{4}	4

Final
1	(Spain) Fernando Verdasco	4	6	7^{7}
7	(India) Prajnesh Gunneswaran	6	3	6^{3}

=== Top half ===
First round
1	(Spain) F Verdasco	6	6
PR	(China) Z Li	4	2
Q	(United States) A Kovacevic	6	6
Q	(Japan) N Nakagawa	2	2
Q	(United States) W Blumberg	6	3	0
(Australia) R Hijikata	2	6	6
(United States) M Mmoh	6	6
6	(France) M Janvier	4	4
4	(Germany) C-M Stebe	2	2
(Australia) B Tomic	6	6
Q	(Japan) S Shimabukuro	3	5
(United States) C Harrison	6	7
(Japan) K Uchida	3	3
(Spain) T Robredo	6	6
WC	(Mexico) A Hernández	2	6	4
8	(France) G Blancaneaux	6	2	6

Second round
1	(Spain) F Verdasco	6	6
Q	(United States) A Kovacevic	4	2
(Australia) R Hijikata	7^{7}	1	4
(United States) M Mmoh	6^{5}	6	6
(Australia) B Tomic	2	5
(United States) C Harrison	6	7
(Spain) T Robredo	3	1
8	(France) G Blancaneaux	6	6

Quarterfinals
1	(Spain) F Verdasco	6	6
(United States) M Mmoh	3	2
(United States) C Harrison	6	6
8	(France) G Blancaneaux	4	2

Semifinals
1	(Spain) F Verdasco	4	6	6
(United States) C Harrison	6	4	2

=== Bottom half ===
First round
7	(India) P Gunneswaran	6	6
WC	(United States) R Harrison	3	4
(United States) A Rybakov	7	6
PR	(New Zealand) R Statham	5	3
Q	(United States) E Zhu	6	6
WC	(United States) Milledge Cossu	1	2
Q	(United States) S Kirchheimer	4	1
3	(Chinese Taipei) J Jung	6	6
5	(Argentina) JP Ficovich	6	7
(Serbia) P Krstin	2	5
(Norway) V Durasovic	2	7^{7}	3
PR	(Japan) G Soeda	6	6^{0}	6
PR	(United States) U Blanch	6	4	6
(Germany) J Lenz	3	6	2
(Chinese Taipei) T-l Wu	4	3
2	(United Kingdom) J Clarke	6	6

Second round
7	(India) P Gunneswaran	7^{7}	6
(United States) A Rybakov	6^{1}	1
Q	(United States) E Zhu	2	5
3	(Chinese Taipei) J Jung	6	7
5	(Argentina) JP Ficovich	6	2	2
PR	(Japan) G Soeda	2	6	6
PR	(United States) U Blanch	7^{7}	6
2	(United Kingdom) J Clarke	6^{4}	2

Quarterfinals
7	(India) P Gunneswaran	1	7	6
3	(Chinese Taipei) J Jung	6	5	4
PR	(Japan) G Soeda	4	7^{7}	6
PR	(United States) U Blanch	6	6^{5}	4

Semifinals
7	(India) P Gunneswaran	6^{7}	7^{7}	6
PR	(Japan) G Soeda	7^{9}	6^{4}	4
