= 2018 Monterrey Challenger =

- Date: 1–7 October
- Edition: 9th
- Draw: 32S / 16D
- Surface: Hard
- Location: Monterrey, Mexico

Champions

Singles
- (Spain) David Ferrer

Doubles
- (El Salvador) Marcelo Arévalo / (India) Jeevan Nedunchezhiyan
- Monterrey Challenger

The 2018 Monterrey Challenger was a professional tennis tournament played on hard courts. It was the ninth edition of the tournament which was part of the 2018 ATP Challenger Tour. It took place in Monterrey, Mexico from 1 to 7 October 2018.

== Singles main-draw entrants ==
=== Seeds ===
| Country | Player | Rank^{1} | Seed |
|---|---|---|---|
| ESP | Marcel Granollers | 104 | 1 |
| ~~USA~~ | ~~Michael Mmoh~~ | ~~108~~ | ~~2~~ |
| ITA | Paolo Lorenzi | 113 | 3 |
| ESP | Adrián Menéndez Maceiras | 121 | 4 |
| CRO | Ivo Karlović | 137 | 5 |
| ESP | David Ferrer | 149 | 6 |
| AUT | Gerald Melzer | 153 | 7 |
| ESP | Pedro Martínez | 174 | 8 |

- ^{1} Rankings are as of 24 September 2018.

=== Other entrants ===
The following players received wildcards into the singles main draw:

- (Dominican Republic) Víctor Estrella Burgos
- (Mexico) Lucas Gómez
- (Mexico) Gerardo López Villaseñor
- (Austria) Jürgen Melzer

The following player received entry into the singles main draw using a protected ranking:

- (Colombia) Santiago Giraldo

The following players received entry from the qualifying draw:

- (United States) Harrison Adams
- (Ecuador) Gonzalo Escobar
- (Canada) Pavel Krainik
- (Hungary) Zsombor Piros

The following player received entry as a lucky loser:

- (United States) Sekou Bangoura

== Champions ==
=== Singles ===
- (Spain) David Ferrer def. (Croatia) Ivo Karlović 6–3, 6–4.

=== Doubles ===
- (El Salvador) Marcelo Arévalo / (India) Jeevan Nedunchezhiyan def. (India) Leander Paes / (Mexico) Miguel Ángel Reyes-Varela 6–1, 6–4.
