= 2022 Monterrey Challenger =

- Date: 7–13 March
- Edition: 12th
- Surface: Hard
- Location: Monterrey, Mexico

Champions

Singles
- (Spain) Fernando Verdasco

Doubles
- (Mexico) Hans Hach Verdugo / (United States) Austin Krajicek
← 2020 ·	Monterrey Challenger	· 2023 →

The 2022 Monterrey Challenger was a professional tennis tournament played on hard courts. It was the twelfth edition of the tournament which was part of the 2022 ATP Challenger Tour. It took place in Monterrey, Mexico from 7 to 13 March 2022.

== Singles main draw entrants ==
=== Seeds ===
Country	Player	Rank^{1}	Seed
ESP	Fernando Verdasco	153	1
GBR	Jay Clarke	173	2
TPE	Jason Jung	218	3
GER	Cedrik-Marcel Stebe	222	4
ARG	Juan Pablo Ficovich	227	5
FRA	Maxime Janvier	239	6
IND	Prajnesh Gunneswaran	246	7
FRA	Geoffrey Blancaneaux	247	8

- ^{1} Rankings are as of 28 February 2022.

=== Other entrants ===
The following players received wildcards into the singles main draw:

- (United States) Milledge Cossu
- (United States) Ryan Harrison
- (Mexico) Alex Hernández

The following players received entry into the singles main draw using protected rankings:

- (United States) Ulises Blanch
- (China) Li Zhe
- (Japan) Go Soeda
- (New Zealand) Rubin Statham

The following players received entry from the qualifying draw:

- (United States) William Blumberg
- (United States) Strong Kirchheimer
- (United States) Aleksandar Kovacevic
- (Japan) Naoki Nakagawa
- (Japan) Sho Shimabukuro
- (United States) Evan Zhu

== Champions ==
=== Singles ===
- (Spain) Fernando Verdasco def. (India) Prajnesh Gunneswaran 4–6, 6–3, 7–6^{(7–3)}.

=== Doubles ===
- (Mexico) Hans Hach Verdugo / (United States) Austin Krajicek def. (United States) Robert Galloway / (Australia) John-Patrick Smith 6–0, 6–3.
