= 2018 Monterrey Challenger – Doubles =

Doubles
- 2018 Monterrey Challenger

Final
- Champions: (El Salvador) Marcelo Arévalo (India) Jeevan Nedunchezhiyan
- Runners-up: (India) Leander Paes (Mexico) Miguel Ángel Reyes-Varela
- Score: 6–1, 6–4

Events
Singles	Doubles
- Monterrey Challenger

Christopher Eubanks and Evan King were the defending champions but only King chose to defend his title, partnering Nathan Pasha. King lost in the first round to Thanasi Kokkinakis and Matt Reid.

Marcelo Arévalo and Jeevan Nedunchezhiyan won the title after defeating Leander Paes and Miguel Ángel Reyes-Varela 6–1, 6–4 in the final.

== Seeds ==
1. (India) Leander Paes / (Mexico) Miguel Ángel Reyes-Varela (final)
2. (Spain) Gerard Granollers / (Spain) Marcel Granollers (quarterfinals)
3. (El Salvador) Marcelo Arévalo / (India) Jeevan Nedunchezhiyan (champions)
4. (United States) Robert Galloway / (United States) Jackson Withrow (first round)

== Draw ==
Key

- Q = Qualifier
- WC = Wild card
- LL = Lucky loser
- Alt = Alternate
- ITF = ITF entry
- PR = Protected ranking
- SR = Special ranking
- SE = Special exempt
- JE = Junior exempt
- JR = Junior Accelerator Programme entrant
- CO = College Accelerator Programme entrant
- NG = Next Gen Accelerator Program entrant
- w/o = Walkover
- r = Retired
- d = Defaulted

First round
1	(India) L Paes (Mexico) MÁ Reyes-Varela	6	6
(Spain) D Ferrer (Spain) P Martínez	3	4
(Uruguay) A Behar (Ecuador) R Quiroz	6	4	[11]
(Austria) G Melzer (Austria) J Melzer	4	6	[9]
4	(United States) R Galloway (United States) J Withrow	6	4	[10]
WC	(Mexico) L Gómez (Dominican Republic) J Hernández-Fernández	4	6	[12]
(Australia) T Kokkinakis (Australia) M Reid	6	6
(United States) E King (United States) N Pasha	4	0
(Italy) P Lorenzi (Venezuela) LD Martínez	6	6
WC	(Mexico) G López Villaseñor (Mexico) L Patiño	3	3
(Spain) A Menéndez Maceiras (Netherlands) M Vervoort	2	6^{5}
3	(El Salvador) M Arévalo (India) J Nedunchezhiyan	6	7^{7}
(Germany) A Begemann (Slovakia) F Polášek	6	7
(Ecuador) G Escobar (Peru) S Galdós	3	5
WC	(United States) E Nava (Mexico) M Sánchez	2	4
2	(Spain) G Granollers (Spain) M Granollers	6	6

Quarterfinals
1	(India) L Paes (Mexico) MÁ Reyes-Varela	6^{4}	6	[10]
(Uruguay) A Behar (Ecuador) R Quiroz	7^{7}	4	[5]
WC	(Mexico) L Gómez (Dominican Republic) J Hernández-Fernández	4	4
(Australia) T Kokkinakis (Australia) M Reid	6	6
(Italy) P Lorenzi (Venezuela) LD Martínez	3	4
3	(El Salvador) M Arévalo (India) J Nedunchezhiyan	6	6
(Germany) A Begemann (Slovakia) F Polášek	6	3	[10]
2	(Spain) G Granollers (Spain) M Granollers	4	6	[3]

Semifinals
1	(India) L Paes (Mexico) MÁ Reyes-Varela	6^{4}	7	[10]
(Australia) T Kokkinakis (Australia) M Reid	7^{7}	5	[8]
3	(El Salvador) M Arévalo (India) J Nedunchezhiyan	6	7^{11}
(Germany) A Begemann (Slovakia) F Polášek	3	6^{9}

Final
1	(India) L Paes (Mexico) MÁ Reyes-Varela	1	4
3	(El Salvador) M Arévalo (India) J Nedunchezhiyan	6	6
