= 2016 Monterrey Challenger – Singles =

Singles
- 2016 Monterrey Challenger

Final
- Champion: (United States) Ernesto Escobedo
- Runner-up: (United States) Denis Kudla
- Score: 6–4, 6–4

Events
Singles	Doubles
- Monterrey Challenger

Thiemo de Bakker was the defending champion but chose not to defend his title.

Ernesto Escobedo won the title after defeating Denis Kudla 6–4, 6–4 in the final.

== Seeds ==
1. (Dominican Republic) Víctor Estrella Burgos (second round)
2. (Germany) Benjamin Becker (semifinals)
3. (United States) Denis Kudla (final)
4. (Argentina) Marco Trungelliti (second round)
5. (United States) Ernesto Escobedo (champion)
6. (Canada) Peter Polansky (semifinals)
7. (Colombia) Eduardo Struvay (first round)
8. (Colombia) Alejandro González (first round)

== Draw ==
Key

- Q = Qualifier
- WC = Wild card
- LL = Lucky loser
- Alt = Alternate
- ITF = ITF entry
- PR = Protected ranking
- SR = Special ranking
- SE = Special exempt
- JE = Junior exempt
- JR = Junior Accelerator Programme entrant
- CO = College Accelerator Programme entrant
- NG = Next Gen Accelerator Program entrant
- w/o = Walkover
- r = Retired
- d = Defaulted

=== Finals ===
Semifinals
6	(Canada) Peter Polansky	2	2
3	(United States) Denis Kudla	6	6
5	(United States) Ernesto Escobedo	6	2	6
2	(Germany) Benjamin Becker	2	6	3

Final
3	(United States) Denis Kudla	4	4
5	(United States) Ernesto Escobedo	6	6

=== Top half ===
First round
1	(Dominican Republic) V Estrella Burgos	6	6
WC	(Mexico) L Gómez	4	4
(Colombia) A Falla	6	6
Alt	(South Africa) N Scholtz	3	4
Alt	(Japan) K Uchida	6^{3}	4
(Ecuador) R Quiroz	7^{7}	6
(Brazil) C Zampieri	5	2
6	(Canada) P Polansky	7	6
3	(United States) D Kudla	7^{7}	6
(United States) E King	6^{3}	1
(Spain) R Ortega Olmedo	6	6
Q	(Spain) J Lizariturry	3	1
(Canada) P Bester	6	6
(United States) A El Mihdawy	4	4
(El Salvador) M Arévalo	6	6
8	(Colombia) A González	2	1

Second round
1	(Dominican Republic) V Estrella Burgos	2	7	6^{1}
(Colombia) A Falla	6	5	7^{7}
(Ecuador) R Quiroz	6^{5}	4
6	(Canada) P Polansky	7^{7}	6
3	(United States) D Kudla	6	6
(Spain) R Ortega Olmedo	3	3
(Canada) P Bester	3	1^{r}
(El Salvador) M Arévalo	6	4

Quarterfinals
(Colombia) A Falla	4	1
6	(Canada) P Polansky	6	6
3	(United States) D Kudla	6	6
(El Salvador) M Arévalo	1	1

Semifinals
6	(Canada) P Polansky	2	2
3	(United States) D Kudla	6	6

=== Bottom half ===
First round
5	(United States) E Escobedo	6	1	6
Q	(South Africa) T Vorster	3	6	4
Q	(Philippines) R Gonzales	6	3	7^{8}
(Brazil) G Clezar	3	6	6^{6}
(Australia) S Groth	7^{7}	7^{7}
(United States) A Sarkissian	6^{3}	6^{5}
Q	(Ecuador) G Escobar	3	6^{4}
4/WC	(Argentina) M Trungelliti	6	7^{7}
7	(Colombia) E Struvay	5	6^{5}
(Italy) A Bega	7	7^{7}
(Australia) J-P Smith	6	6
WC	(Mexico) Mauricio Astorga	3	2
WC	(Mexico) D Garza	4	4
(Ecuador) E Gómez	6	6
(Republic of Ireland) S Barry	0^{r}
2	(Germany) B Becker	3

Second round
5	(United States) E Escobedo	7^{11}	6
Q	(Philippines) R Gonzales	6^{9}	4
(Australia) S Groth	6	6
4/WC	(Argentina) M Trungelliti	3	3
(Italy) A Bega	2	6	0
(Australia) J-P Smith	6	3	6
(Ecuador) E Gómez	3	6^{0}
2	(Germany) B Becker	6	7^{7}

Quarterfinals
5	(United States) E Escobedo	7^{8}	6^{4}	7^{7}
(Australia) S Groth	6^{6}	7^{7}	6^{2}
(Australia) J-P Smith	4	3
2	(Germany) B Becker	6	6

Semifinals
5	(United States) E Escobedo	6	2	6
2	(Germany) B Becker	2	6	3
