= 2022 Monterrey Challenger – Doubles =

Doubles
- 2022 Monterrey Challenger

Final
- Champions: (Mexico) Hans Hach Verdugo (United States) Austin Krajicek
- Runners-up: (United States) Robert Galloway (Australia) John-Patrick Smith
- Score: 6–0, 6–3

Events
Singles	Doubles
- Monterrey Challenger

Karol Drzewiecki and Gonçalo Oliveira were the defending champions but chose not to defend their title.

Hans Hach Verdugo and Austin Krajicek won the title after defeating Robert Galloway and John-Patrick Smith 6–0, 6–3 in the final.

== Seeds ==
1. (Mexico) Hans Hach Verdugo / (United States) Austin Krajicek (champions)
2. (United States) Nathaniel Lammons / (United States) Jackson Withrow (semifinals)
3. (France) Sadio Doumbia / (France) Fabien Reboul (semifinals)
4. (United States) Robert Galloway / (Australia) John-Patrick Smith (final)

== Draw ==
Key

- Q = Qualifier
- WC = Wild card
- LL = Lucky loser
- Alt = Alternate
- ITF = ITF entry
- PR = Protected ranking
- SR = Special ranking
- SE = Special exempt
- JE = Junior exempt
- JR = Junior Accelerator Programme entrant
- CO = College Accelerator Programme entrant
- NG = Next Gen Accelerator Program entrant
- w/o = Walkover
- r = Retired
- d = Defaulted

First round
1	(Mexico) H Hach Verdugo (United States) A Krajicek	7^{7}	6
WC	(Mexico) M Sánchez (Australia) B Tomic	6^{4}	2
(Philippines) T Huey (Australia) M Reid	6	6
(United States) E King (United States) A Lawson	4	4
3	(France) S Doumbia (France) F Reboul	6	6
PR	(China) Z Li (Japan) G Soeda	2	2
(United States) W Blumberg (United States) M Schnur	6	6
(Germany) J Lenz (United States) H Reese	3	3
(United States) C Harrison (United States) R Stalder	7^{9}	7^{10}
(Spain) S Martos Gornés (New Zealand) A Sitak	6^{7}	6^{8}
WC	(Mexico) Emiliano Aguilera (Mexico) R Pacheco Méndez	2	2
4	(United States) R Galloway (Australia) J-P Smith	6	6
(Mexico) L Patiño (Mexico) MÁ Reyes-Varela	6	6
(Germany) C-M Stebe (Japan) K Uchida	3	3
(Argentina) G Durán (Venezuela) LD Martínez	1	4
2	(United States) N Lammons (United States) J Withrow	6	6

Quarterfinals
1	(Mexico) H Hach Verdugo (United States) A Krajicek	6	7^{7}
(Philippines) T Huey (Australia) M Reid	1	6^{3}
3	(France) S Doumbia (France) F Reboul	6	6
(United States) W Blumberg (United States) M Schnur	4	3
(United States) C Harrison (United States) R Stalder	6	3	[7]
4	(United States) R Galloway (Australia) J-P Smith	3	6	[10]
(Mexico) L Patiño (Mexico) MÁ Reyes-Varela	6^{3}	1
2	(United States) N Lammons (United States) J Withrow	7^{7}	6

Semifinals
1	(Mexico) H Hach Verdugo (United States) A Krajicek	6	6
3	(France) S Doumbia (France) F Reboul	3	4
4	(United States) R Galloway (Australia) J-P Smith	6	3	[10]
2	(United States) N Lammons (United States) J Withrow	4	6	[6]

Final
1	(Mexico) H Hach Verdugo (United States) A Krajicek	6	6
4	(United States) R Galloway (Australia) J-P Smith	0	3
