= Denis Kudla =

American tennis player

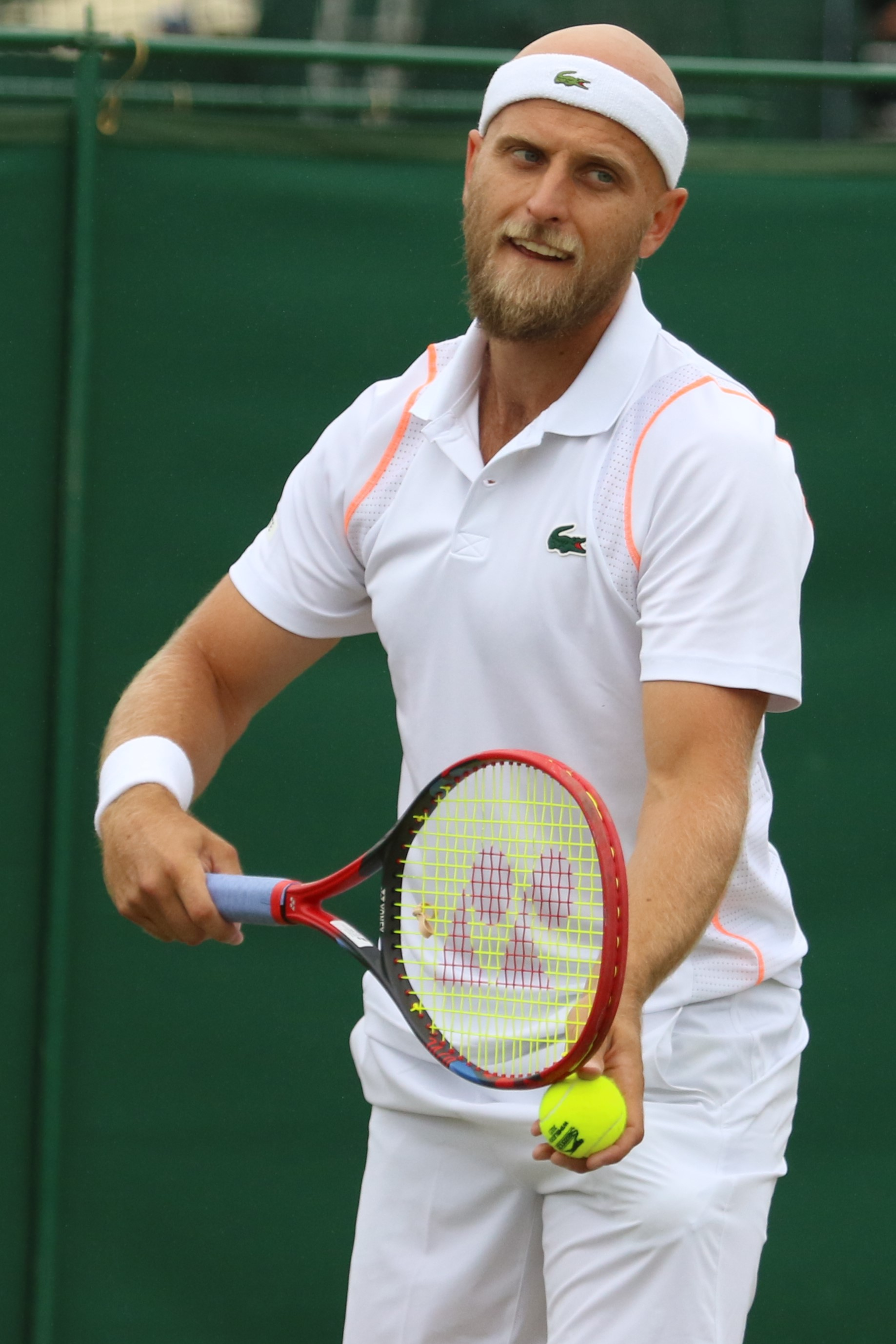
- Kudla at the 2023 Wimbledon Championships
- Native name: Денис Кудла
- Country (sports): United States
- Residence: Arlington, Virginia & Tampa, Florida, US
- Born: August 17, 1992 (age 34) Kyiv, Ukraine
- Height: 5 ft 11 in (1.80 m)
- Turned pro: 2010
- Retired: January 2025
- Plays: Right-handed (two-handed backhand)
- Prize money: US $4,647,695

Singles
- Career record: 72–132
- Career titles: 0
- Highest ranking: No. 53 (May 23, 2016)

Grand Slam singles results
- Australian Open: 2R (2016, 2018, 2019, 2023)
- French Open: 1R (2013, 2016, 2018, 2019, 2022)
- Wimbledon: 4R (2015)
- US Open: 3R (2019)

Other tournaments
- Olympic Games: 1R (2016)

Doubles
- Career record: 19–40
- Career titles: 0
- Highest ranking: No. 133 (August 27, 2018)

Grand Slam doubles results
- Australian Open: 2R (2019)
- French Open: 2R (2016)
- Wimbledon: QF (2022)
- US Open: 3R (2023)

Grand Slam mixed doubles results
- Wimbledon: 1R (2019)
- US Open: 2R (2019, 2023)

Denis Kudla (Note: Ukrainian: Денис Кудла, romanized: Denys Kudla) (/ˈkuːdlə/ KOOD-lə; born August 17, 1992) is an American tennis coach and former professional player. He reached an ATP singles ranking of world No. 53 in May 2016 and a doubles ranking of No. 133 in August 2018. He won nine Challenger singles and nine doubles titles. He coached Reilly Opelka.

== Personal life ==
Kudla's family moved from Ukraine to Fairfax, Virginia, on his first birthday, shortly after the Soviet Union collapsed. Kudla's parents moved to the US not speaking a word of English, but learned it within a few years.

He began playing tennis at age seven, because his older brother Nikita and many of his father's friends played. He tagged along as Nikita took informal lessons from their father, Vladimir Kudla, in Fairfax's Van Dyck Park.

At age 10, his mother got permission to pick him up from elementary school one hour early so that they could go from Fairfax to the Junior Tennis Champions Center (JTCC) in College Park, Maryland. She used to wait for him during his two-hour practices. She drove home while he slept, and then she used to wake him up for dinner and homework.

His family moved to Arlington when he was 13 years old, where Kudla was set to matriculate at Washington-Lee High School. A schedule of six hours of tennis court time each day was going to leave no room for a traditional high school life. He was home-schooled at JTCC, graduating from Laurel Springs School, the NCAA approved online private school. He had to commute on his own to practice in College Park via the Metro, lugging two racket bags and changing trains twice during rush hour. "My parents were strict, but not crazy strict. I was never spoiled. I wanted tennis. It was always my dream." One of Kudla's favorite experiences was visiting the White House for the 2013 Easter Egg Roll, when he met President Barack Obama and NFL Pro Bowlers Anquan Boldin and Adrian Peterson. Early in his career, Kudla worked out with trainer Greg Petrosian in Boca Raton, Florida.

== Junior career ==
Kudla won his first international match in 2008: the 16-and-under age bracket at the Orange Bowl. The number one seed, he beat Mitchell Frank, a future University of Virginia tennis player, with whom he trained at College Park. Kudla became the first American to win the Boys’ 16s title since Donald Young in 2003.

Kudla also participated in the 2008 BNP Paribas Showdown vs Junior A. Ore at Madison Square Garden, as they were the under-card for Roger Federer and Pete Sampras who competed against each other afterwards. Soon after, Kudla turned pro even though he had great interest from the University of Virginia as he was the 2nd-ranked senior in the nation. Kudla reached a career-high combined junior ranking of world No. 3. He believes the turning point in his junior tennis career was when he came from behind to beat junior tennis prodigy Trey Hatcher of Knoxville, Tennessee 7–5, 7–6 at the Boys 12s National Hard Court Championships in 2003.

His best result was reaching the final of the 2010 US Open for boys. He won the first set, but he eventually lost against Jack Sock.

== Professional career ==
=== 2008–2011: ATP debut ===
Kudla reached the semifinals of his second professional tour event, U.S.A. F15 ITF Futures event, held in New York in June 2008.

He first played an ATP Tour main-draw match six weeks later, in doubles at the 2008 Legg Mason Tennis Classic, partnering with fellow junior Junior A. Ore. The pair, a wildcard entry, lost their first-round match to Lucas Arnold Ker, and Eduardo Schwank. Two years later, he was given a wildcard for the singles main draw of the 2010 Campbell's Hall of Fame Tennis Championships and reached the second round, where he lost to fellow American Ryan Harrison.

His first tour-level doubles match win came in reaching the second round in doubles at the 2011 U.S. Men's Clay Court Championships in Houston, Texas partnering Donald Young. Kudla reached the quarterfinals in singles at the 2011 Campbell's Hall of Fame Tennis Championships, having knocked off big-serving Ivo Karlović in three sets, and then second seed Grigor Dimitrov. Kudla lost to qualifier Michael Yani in three sets in the quarterfinals.

Kudla played his first Legg Mason Tennis Classic in Washington, D.C. in 2011, losing in the first round to Tobias Kamke.

=== 2012–2013: Grand Slam debut ===
In 2012, Kudla qualified for the main draw of a Grand Slam for the first time at the Australian Open. He lost in the first round to Tommy Haas. He qualified for the 2012 SAP Open in San Jose, California and beat Jack Sock in the first round. In March 2012, Denis Kudla lost to Roger Federer in the second round of Indian Wells Masters tournament.

In 2013 at the Australian Open he lost in the first round of qualifying to Julian Reister. Then at the French Open he qualified for the main draw before losing to Jan Hájek. At Wimbledon he again qualified for the main draw and won his first Grand Slam match against James Duckworth. He could not repeat the victory, losing to Ivan Dodig while plagued with a back injury throughout the three sets. At the 2013 US Open, he beat Jiří Veselý in four sets before losing to Tomáš Berdych.

=== 2014–2015: Wimbledon fourth round ===
After a lackluster start to the 2014 season, he was able to qualify and win his first match at Wimbledon against Marsel İlhan, before falling to Kei Nishikori. The following week, he returned to the US and won the 2014 Winnetka Challenger. He had a bout with mononucleosis, however, that caused him to miss most of the fall schedule. He returned to form in the 2015 grass-court season, making the finals of the 2015 Aegon Surbiton Trophy Challenger, before avenging his finals loss the following week to defeat Matthew Ebden and win the first edition of the 2015 Aegon Ilkley Trophy Challenger. Based on this success, he was rewarded with a wildcard into the main draw of Wimbledon. He began the tournament by defeating 28th seed Pablo Cuevas despite losing the first two sets. In the following rounds, he defeated Alexander Zverev in four sets and Santiago Giraldo in five sets. Kudla was narrowly beaten in the fourth round by US Open champion Marin Čilić.

=== 2016–2018: High career singles and doubles rankings ===
In 2016, Kudla made it to the second round of the Australian Open and lost in the first round of the year's remaining three Slams. He reached his career-high singles ranking of No. 53 on May 23, 2016. He also competed in singles at the 2016 Rio Olympics for the United States. In 2017, Kudla failed to qualify for any of the Grand Slam Tournaments.

At the 2018 Australian Open, post-qualifying, Kudla beat compatriot Steve Johnson in the first round of the tournament, and took the first two sets off of the fifth seed Dominic Thiem in the second round. Kudla made the main draw of the 2018 French Open when he beat Jürgen Zopp in the final round of qualifying. However he lost to the 26th seed Damir Džumhur in the first round. He reached his career-high doubles ranking of No. 133 on August 27, 2018.

He finished the year 2018 with a singles high ranking of No. 63 his best year-end ranking in his career.

=== 2019–2021: US Open and Wimbledon third rounds ===
Kudla made the third round of the 2019 US Open for the first time in his career defeating No. 27 seed Dušan Lajović before losing to World No. 1 Novak Djokovic.

In January 2021, Kudla tested positive for COVID-19 during the Australian Open qualifying event in Doha. In June at the 2021 Wimbledon Championships, he reached the third round as a qualifier, for the first time since 2015 when he reached the fourth round which was his best showing at any Grand Slam. He defeated 30th seed Alejandro Davidovich Fokina in a five set match and veteran Andreas Seppi in the second round. He was eventually ousted by Novak Djokovic but not before giving a tough fight to the world No. 1 in all three sets played.

=== 2022: Back to top 100, Miami Masters third round, Major doubles quarterfinal ===
He returned to the top 100 at World No. 84 on 21 March 2022 following his eight Challenger title at the 2022 Arizona Tennis Classic in Phoenix. At the same tournament he also won in doubles partnering Treat Huey. He followed that performance by a third round showing as a qualifier at the 2022 Miami Open for the first time in his career at the Masters level defeating Shang Juncheng and 19th seed Lorenzo Sonego before losing to fellow qualifier Thanasi Kokkinakis.

With partner Jack Sock he reached his first Grand Slam quarterfinal at the 2022 Wimbledon Championships where they lost to sixth seeded Colombians Juan Sebastián Cabal and Robert Farah.

=== 2023–2025: Two-time United Cup champion, retirement ===
Kudla was selected as the No. 3 ATP player as part of the 2023 United Cup United States winning team. He entered the 2023 Australian Open as a lucky loser where he defeated Russian Roman Safiullin to reach the second round for the fourth time at this Major. At the 2023 Delray Beach Open he won his opening match against Jordan Thompson.

In October 2023, he was selected again this time as the No. 2 ATP player at the 2024 United Cup as part of the US team. He qualified for the 2024 Dallas Open as a lucky loser and won his first round match against Radu Albot before losing this time to Jordan Thompson. Ranked No. 179, he also qualified for the 2024 BNP Paribas Open.

In October 2024, he was selected for the second consecutive time as the No. 2 ATP player at the 2025 United Cup as part of the team that reached again the final. Kudla and Desirae Krawczyk beat Czechs Patrik Rikl and Gabriela Knutson in straight sets in the semifinal stage. Ultimately, the United States won the United Cup title for a second time defeating Poland. Right before lifting the trophy with the USA team, Kudla announced his retirement on 4 January 2025.

== Performance timelines ==
Key
W	F	SF	QF	#R	RR	Q#	P#	DNQ	A	Z#	PO	G	S	B	NMS	NTI	P	NH

(W) winner; (F) finalist; (SF) semifinalist; (QF) quarterfinalist; (#R) rounds 4, 3, 2, 1; (RR) round-robin stage; (Q#) qualification round; (P#) preliminary round; (DNQ) did not qualify; (A) absent; (Z#) Davis/Fed Cup Zonal Group (with number indication) or (PO) play-off; (G) gold, (S) silver or (B) bronze Olympic/Paralympic medal; (NMS) not a Masters tournament; (NTI) not a Tier I tournament; (P) postponed; (NH) not held; (SR) strike rate (events won / competed); (W–L) win–loss record.
To avoid confusion and double counting, these charts are updated at the conclusion of a tournament or when the player's participation has ended.

=== Singles ===
Tournament	2010	2011	2012	2013	2014	2015	2016	2017	2018	2019	2020	2021	2022	2023	2024	SR	W–L
Grand Slam tournaments
Australian Open	A	A	1R	Q1	1R	1R	2R	Q3	2R	2R	Q2	Q2	1R	2R	Q2	0 / 8	4–8
French Open	A	A	Q2	1R	Q1	Q1	1R	Q3	1R	1R	Q1	Q2	1R	Q1	Q3	0 / 5	0–5
Wimbledon	A	A	Q3	2R	2R	4R	1R	Q3	1R	2R	NH	3R	1R	Q3	Q1	0 / 8	8–8
US Open	A	Q3	1R	2R	A	1R	1R	Q1	2R	3R	1R	2R	1R	Q1	Q1	0 / 9	5–9
Win–loss	0–0	0–0	0–2	2–3	1–2	3–3	1–4	0–0	2–4	4–4	0–1	3–2	0–4	1–1	0–0	0 / 30	17–30
National representation
Summer Olympics	NH		A	NH			1R	NH				A	NH		A	0 / 1	0–1
ATP Masters 1000
Indian Wells Masters	A	Q1	2R	Q1	A	1R	2R	Q2	Q1	1R	NH	1R	Q2	Q1	1R	0 / 6	2–6
Miami Open	A	A	1R	A	Q1	Q1	2R	Q1	Q2	1R	NH	2R	3R	1R	A	0 / 6	4–6
Monte-Carlo Masters	A	A	A	A	A	1R	A	A	A	A	NH	A	A	A	A	0 / 1	0–1
Madrid Open	A	A	A	A	A	A	2R	A	A	Q1	NH	A	Q1	A	A	0 / 1	1–1
Italian Open	A	A	A	A	A	A	Q2	A	A	Q1	A	A	Q1	A	A	0 / 0	0–0
Canadian Open	A	A	A	Q2	A	1R	1R	A	A	A	NH	A	Q1	A	A	0 / 2	0–2
Cincinnati Masters	A	A	A	Q1	A	1R	A	A	1R	1R	Q1	A	Q1	A	A	0 / 3	0–3
Shanghai Masters	A	A	A	A	A	A	A	A	Q1	A	NH			A	A	0 / 0	0–0
Paris Masters	A	A	A	Q1	A	A	A	A	Q2	A	A	A	A	A	A	0 / 0	0–0
Win–loss	0–0	0–0	1–2	0–0	0–0	0–4	3–4	0–0	0–1	0–3	0–0	1–2	2–1	0–1	0–1	0 / 19	7–19
Career statistics
Tournaments	1	2	6	11	5	14	20	1	14	22	1	11	16	5	3	132	
Overall win–loss	1–1	2–2	2–6	5–11	3–5	8–14	8–20	1–1	11–14	11–22	0–1	9–11	6–16	4–5	1–3	72–132	
Year-end ranking	496	276	137	114	121	69	131	174	63	113	114	105	106	163	267	35.29%	

=== Doubles ===
Tournament	2011	2012	2013	2014	2015	2016	2017	2018	2019	2020	2021	2022	2023	2024	SR	W–L
Grand Slam tournaments
Australian Open	A	A	A	A	A	1R	A	A	2R	A	A	A	A	A	0 / 2	1–2
French Open	A	A	A	A	A	2R	A	A	1R	A	A	1R	A	A	0 / 3	1–3
Wimbledon	A	A	1R	Q2	A	1R	A	Q1	A	NH	A	QF	A	A	0 / 3	3–3
US Open	1R	A	2R	A	1R	1R	A	A	A	A	A	1R	3R	A	0 / 6	3–6
Win–loss	0–1	0–0	1–2	0–0	0–1	1–4	0–0	0–0	1–2	0–0	0–0	3–3	2–1	0–0	0 / 14	8–14

== ATP Challenger and ITF Tour finals ==
=== Singles: 23 (11 titles, 12 runner-ups) ===
Legend ATP Challenger Tour (9–12) ITF Futures (2–0)	Finals by surface Hard (9–9) Clay (1–0) Grass (1–3)

Result	W–L	Date	Tournament	Tier	Surface	Opponent	Score
Win	1–0	Jul 2012	Lexington Challenger, US	Challenger	Hard	(Canada) Érik Chvojka	5–7, 7–5, 6–1
Win	2–0	Nov 2012	Charlottesville Men's Pro Challenger, US	Challenger	Hard (i)	(United States) Alex Kuznetsov	6–0, 6–3
Loss	2–1	Mar 2013	Dallas Tennis Classic, US	Challenger	Hard	(Austria) Jürgen Melzer	4–6, 6–2, 1–6
Win	3–1	May 2013	Tallahassee Challenger, US	Challenger	Clay	(Germany) Cedrik-Marcel Stebe	6–3, 6–3
Loss	3–2	Mar 2014	Jalisco Open, Mexico	Challenger	Hard	(Luxembourg) Gilles Müller	2–6, 2–6
Win	4–2	Jul 2014	Nielsen Pro Tennis Championship, US	Challenger	Hard	(Uzbekistan) Farrukh Dustov	6–2, 6–2
Loss	4–3	Jun 2015	Surbiton Trophy, UK	Challenger	Grass	(Australia) Matthew Ebden	7–6^{(7–4)}, 4–6, 6–7^{(5–7)}
Win	5–3	Jun 2015	Ilkley Trophy, UK	Challenger	Grass	(Australia) Matthew Ebden	6–3, 6–4
Loss	5–4	Oct 2015	Tiburon Challenger, US	Challenger	Hard	(United States) Tim Smyczek	6–1, 1–6, 6–7^{(7–9)}
Loss	5–5	Oct 2016	Monterrey Challenger, Mexico	Challenger	Hard	(United States) Ernesto Escobedo	4–6, 4–6
Loss	5–6	Nov 2017	Knoxville Challenger, US	Challenger	Hard (i)	(Canada) Filip Peliwo	4–6, 2–6
Win	6–6	Mar 2018	Challenger de Drummondville, Canada	Challenger	Hard	(France) Benjamin Bonzi	6–0, 7–5
Loss	6–7	Apr 2018	Open de Guadeloupe, Guadeloupe (France)	Challenger	Hard	(Serbia) Dušan Lajović	4–6, 0–6
Loss	6–8	Feb 2020	RBC Tennis Championships, US	Challenger	Hard (i)	(Austria) Jurij Rodionov	5–7, 6–7^{(10–12)}
Win	7–8	Nov 2020	Cary Challenger, US	Challenger	Hard	(India) Prajnesh Gunneswaran	3–6, 6–3, 6–0
Loss	7–9	Apr 2021	Orlando Open, US	Challenger	Hard	(United States) Jenson Brooksby	3–6, 3–6
Loss	7–10	Jun 2021	Nottingham Open, UK	Challenger	Grass	(United States) Frances Tiafoe	1–6, 3–6
Win	8–10	Mar 2022	Arizona Tennis Classic, US	Challenger	Hard	(Germany) Daniel Altmaier	2–6, 6–2, 6–3
Loss	8–11	May 2022	Surbiton Trophy, UK	Challenger	Grass	(Australia) Jordan Thompson	5–7, 3–6
Win	9–11	Sep 2023	Columbus Challenger, US	Challenger	Hard (i)	(Canada) Alexis Galarneau	6–2, 6–1
Loss	9–12	Nov 2023	Knoxville Challenger, US	Challenger	Hard (i)	(United States) Alex Michelsen	5–7, 6–4, 2–6

Result	W–L	Date	Tournament	Tier	Surface	Opponent	Score
Win	1–0	Oct 2010	US F26, Houston	Futures	Hard	(United States) Tyler Hochwalt	7–5, 6–1
Win	2–0	Oct 2011	US F25, Laguna Niguel	Futures	Hard	(United States) Dennis Lajola	6–4, 6–0

=== Doubles: 21 (11 titles, 10 runner-ups) ===
Legend ATP Challenger Tour (9–6) ITF Futures (2–4)	Finals by surface Hard (8–8) Clay (3–1) Grass (0–1)

Result	W–L	Date	Tournament	Tier	Surface	Partner	Opponents	Score
Win	1–0	Jan 2014	Tennis Championships of Maui, US	Challenger	Hard	(Japan) Yasutaka Uchiyama	(United States) Daniel Kosakowski (United States) Nicolas Meister	6–3, 6–2
Win	2–0	Jul 2014	Nielsen Pro Tennis Championship, US	Challenger	Hard	(Australia) Thanasi Kokkinakis	(United States) Evan King (United States) Raymond Sarmiento	6–2, 7–6^{(7–4)}
Win	3–0	Oct 2016	Monterrey Challenger, Mexico	Challenger	Hard	(United States) Evan King	(Australia) Jarryd Chaplin (New Zealand) Ben McLachlan	6–7^{(4–7)}, 6–4, [10–2]
Loss	3–1	Oct 2016	Las Vegas Challenger, US	Challenger	Hard	(United States) Bjorn Fratangelo	(United States) Brian Baker (Australia) Matt Reid	1–6, 5–7
Loss	3–2	Jun 2017	Surbiton Trophy, UK	Challenger	Grass	(Philippines) Treat Huey	(New Zealand) Marcus Daniell (Pakistan) Aisam-ul-Haq Qureshi	3–6, 6–7^{(0–7)}
Win	4–2	Jul 2017	LG&T Tennis Challenger, US	Challenger	Hard	(United States) Daniel Nguyen	(Australia) Jarryd Chaplin (Australia) Luke Saville	6–3, 7–6^{(7–5)}
Win	5–2	Sep 2017	Columbus Challenger, US	Challenger	Hard (i)	(Germany) Dominik Köpfer	(United Kingdom) Luke Bambridge (Republic of Ireland) David O'Hare	7–6^{(8–6)}, 7–6^{(7–3)}
Loss	5–3	Oct 2017	Stockton Challenger, US	Challenger	Hard	(Latvia) Miķelis Lībietis	(United Kingdom) Brydan Klein (United Kingdom) Joe Salisbury	2–6, 4–6
Win	6–3	Nov 2017	Charlottesville Men's Pro Challenger, US	Challenger	Hard (i)	(United States) Danny Thomas	(Australia) Jarryd Chaplin (Latvia) Miķelis Lībietis	6–7^{(4–7)}, 1–4 ret.
Loss	6–4	Jan 2018	Oracle Challenger – Newport Beach, US	Challenger	Hard	(Philippines) Treat Huey	(United States) James Cerretani (India) Leander Paes	4–6, 5–7
Win	7–4	Apr 2018	Tallahassee Tennis Challenger, US	Challenger	Clay	(United States) Robert Galloway	(Spain) Enrique López Pérez (India) Jeevan Nedunchezhiyan	6–3, 6–1
Win	8–4	Mar 2020	Oracle Challenger – Indian Wells, US	Challenger	Hard	(United States) Thai-Son Kwiatkowski	(United States) Sebastian Korda (United States) Mitchell Krueger	6–3, 2–6, [10–6]
Win	9–4	Mar 2022	Arizona Tennis Classic, US	Challenger	Hard	(Philippines) Treat Huey	(Germany) Oscar Otte (Germany) Jan-Lennard Struff	7–6^{(12–10)}, 3–6, [10–6]
Loss	9–5	Oct 2023	Fairfield Challenger, US	Challenger	Hard	(United States) Vasil Kirkov	(United States) Evan King (United States) Reese Stalder	5–7, 3–6
Loss	9–6	Oct 2023	Charlottesville Men's Pro Challenger, US	Challenger	Hard (i)	(United States) Thai-Son Kwiatkowski	(Australia) John-Patrick Smith (Netherlands) Sem Verbeek	6–3, 3–6, [5–10]

Result	W–L	Date	Tournament	Tier	Surface	Partner	Opponents	Score
Loss	0–1	Oct 2009	US F24, Laguna Niguel	Futures	Hard	(United States) Raymond Sarmiento	(United States) Ryan Harrison (United States) Michael Venus	2–6, 4–6
Loss	0–2	Nov 2009	US F28, Niceville	Futures	Clay	(United States) Sekou Bangoura	(Armenia) Tigran Martirosyan (Russia) Artem Sitak	4–6, 5–7
Win	1–2	May 2010	US F11, Orange Park	Futures	Clay	(United States) Andrea Collarini	(United States) Mitchell Frank (United States) Junior A. Ore	7–6^{(8–6)}, 6–3
Win	2–2	May 2010	US F12, Tampa	Futures	Clay	(United States) Junior A. Ore	(Brazil) Clayton Almeida (United States) Blake Strode	4–6, 6–3, [10–8]
Loss	2–3	Oct 2010	US F27, Mansfield	Futures	Hard	(United States) Andrea Collarini	(Bulgaria) Dimitar Kutrovsky (United States) Joshua Zavala	3–6, 2–6
Loss	2–4	Nov 2010	US F29, Niceville	Futures	Hard	(United States) Andrea Collarini	(United States) Robbye Poole (Norway) Erling Tveit	6–7^{(4–7)}, 2–6

== Junior Grand Slam finals ==
=== Singles: 1 (runner-up) ===
Result	Year	Tournament	Surface	Opponent	Score
Loss	2010	US Open	Hard	(United States) Jack Sock	6–3, 2–6, 2–6
