= Emilio Gómez (tennis) =

Ecuadorian tennis player (b. 1991)

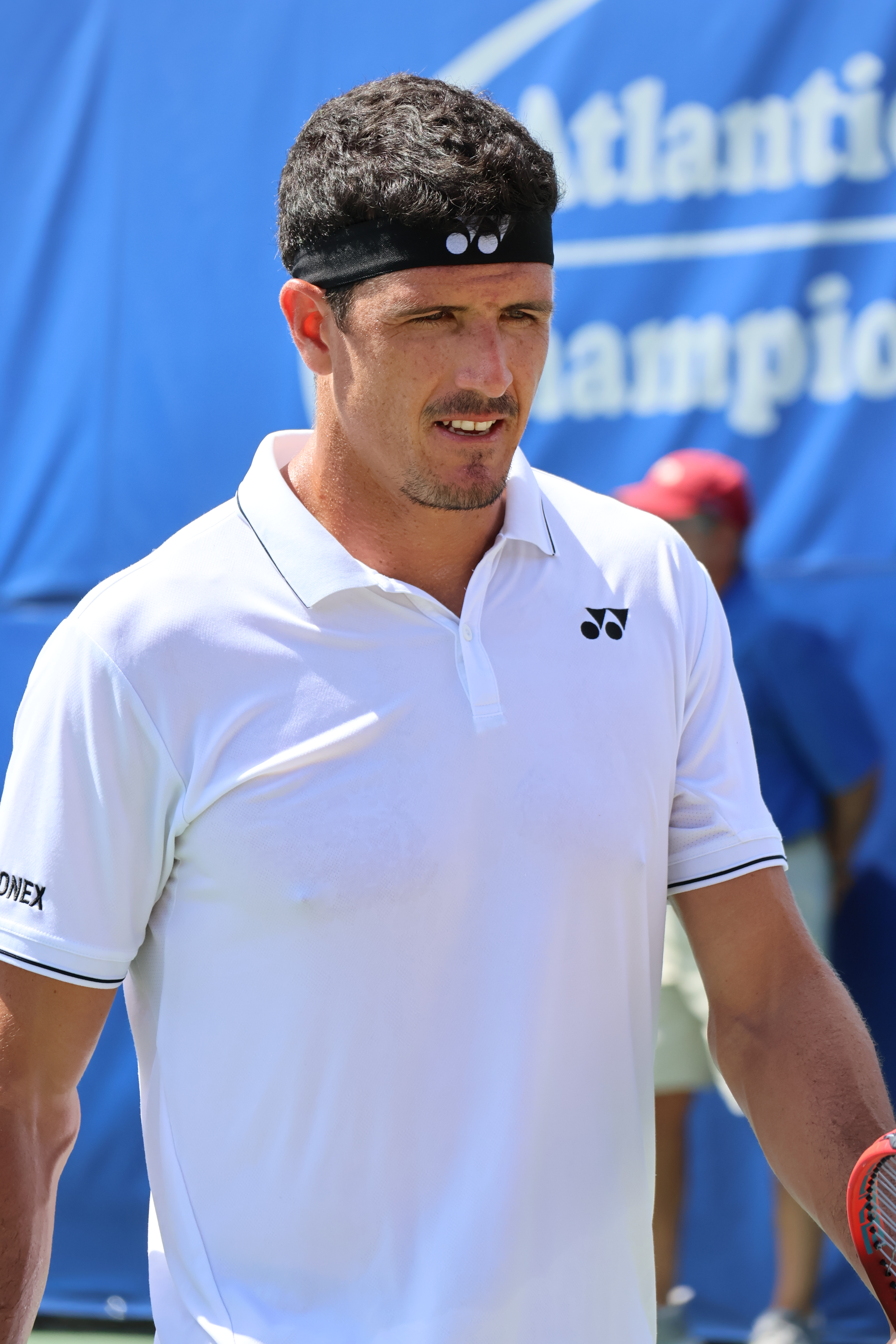
- Emilio Gómez in 2023.
- Country (sports): Ecuador
- Born: 28 November 1991 (age 34) Guayaquil, Ecuador
- Height: 1.85 m (6 ft 1 in)
- Turned pro: 2013
- Retired: 2024
- Plays: Right-handed (two-handed backhand)
- Coach: Andrés Schneiter
- Prize money: US $1,061,377

Singles
- Career record: 24–31
- Career titles: 0
- Highest ranking: No. 90 (27 February 2023)

Grand Slam singles results
- Australian Open: 1R (2022)
- French Open: 1R (2020)
- Wimbledon: Q2 (2023)
- US Open: Q3 (2014)

Doubles
- Career record: 3–9
- Career titles: 0
- Highest ranking: No. 254 (14 September 2015)

Team competitions
- Davis Cup: 17–13
Medal record
Representing Ecuador
Men's tennis
Pan American Games
Bronze medal – third place	2015 Toronto	Men's doubles
South American Games
Gold medal – first place	2018 Cochabamba	Men's doubles
Bolivarian Games
Silver medal – second place	2013 Trujillo	Men's doubles
Bronze medal – third place	2013 Trujillo	Men's singles
Bronze medal – third place	2013 Trujillo	Men's Nations Cup

Emilio Gómez Estrada (Latin American Spanish: [eˈmiljo ˈɣomes]; (Note: In isolation, Gómez is pronounced [ˈɡomes].) born 28 November 1991) is an Ecuadorian former professional tennis player who competed primarily on the ATP Challenger Tour. He has a career-high ATP singles ranking of No. 90 achieved on 20 February 2023 and a doubles ranking of No. 254 achieved on 14 September 2015.

== Career ==
=== 2016–2018 ===
He defeated Adam Hornby of Barbados during Davis Cup play on 4 March 2016, by a score of 6–0, 6–0, 6–0, making him the first player to win by such a scoreline at any tournament since 2011, and one of two players to accomplish the feat on that day (Jarkko Nieminen of Finland earned a triple bagel victory over Courtney John Lock of Zimbabwe at Davis Cup competition elsewhere).

=== 2019–2021: First Challenger title, Top 200 & Grand Slam debuts ===
He reached the top 200 on 29 April 2019 following his first title at the 2019 Tallahassee Tennis Challenger in Florida.

Gómez made his Grand Slam main draw debut at the 2020 French Open as a qualifier where he was defeated by Lorenzo Sonego in the first round.

=== 2022: Australian Open debut, Two Challenger titles & four more finals, Top 100 ===
He made his 2022 Australian Open debut as a qualifier where he lost to 27th seed Marin Čilić.

He reached his sixth Challenger final of the year in Gwangju, South Korea. As a result, he reached the top 100 in the rankings at a new career-high of world No. 98 on 10 October 2022.

=== 2023: First ATP quarterfinal, top 90 ===
In Dallas he defeated Gabriel Diallo and fourth seed Miomir Kecmanović to reach the quarterfinals. Before the tournament he had won only three ATP matches. As a result, he moved to a new career high of No. 94 on 13 February 2023.

In his next tournament in Delray Beach, he continued his good form winning his opening match against qualifier Wu Tung-lin. He reached the top 90 on 27 February 2023.

== Personal life ==
Emilio is the son of Grand Slam champion and former doubles world no. 1 Andrés Gómez. He is also the cousin of former singles world no. 6 Nicolás Lapentti and Roberto Quiroz.

== Performance timeline ==
Key
W	F	SF	QF	#R	RR	Q#	DNQ	A	NH

(W) winner; (F) finalist; (SF) semifinalist; (QF) quarterfinalist; (#R) rounds 4, 3, 2, 1; (RR) round-robin stage; (Q#) qualification round; (DNQ) did not qualify; (A) absent; (NH) not held; (SR) strike rate (events won / competed); (W–L) win–loss record.
To avoid confusion and double counting, these charts are updated at the conclusion of a tournament or when the player's participation has ended.

Current through the 2023 US Open qualifying.

Tournament	2019	2020	2021	2022	2023	SR	W–L	Win %
Grand Slam tournaments
Australian Open	A	Q1	Q1	1R	Q2	0 / 1	0–1	0%
French Open	Q2	1R	Q1	Q1	Q1	0 / 1	0–1	0%
Wimbledon	Q1	NH	Q1	Q1	Q2	0 / 0	0–0	–
US Open	Q2	A	Q2	Q2	Q1	0 / 0	0–0	–
Win–loss	0–0	0–1	0–0	0–1	0–0	0 / 2	0–2	0%
Year-end ranking	147	160	149	114	295			

== Challenger and Futures finals ==
=== Singles: 22 (14–8) ===
Legend (singles) ATP Challenger Tour (4–6) ITF Futures Tour (10–2)	Titles by surface Hard (8–8) Clay (6–0) Grass (0–0) Carpet (0–0)

Result	W–L	Date	Tournament	Tier	Surface	Opponent	Score
Win	1–0	Aug 2009	Ecuador F1, Guayaquil	Futures	Hard	(Ecuador) Gonzalo Escobar	6–3, 6–2
Win	2–0	Aug 2012	Ecuador F1, Guayaquil	Futures	Hard	(Dominican Republic) José Hernández-Fernández	6–3, 4–6, 6–2
Loss	2–1	Aug 2012	Ecuador F2, Guayaquil	Futures	Hard	(Dominican Republic) José Hernández-Fernández	6–2, 3–6, 4–6
Win	3–1	Aug 2013	Ecuador F1, Guayaquil	Futures	Hard	(Ecuador) Gonzalo Escobar	7–5, 7–6^{(7–3)}
Win	4–1	Aug 2013	Ecuador F2, Guayaquil	Futures	Hard	(Chile) Benjamín Ugarte	6–2, 6–1
Win	5–1	May 2015	Colombia F1, Pereira	Futures	Clay	(Brazil) João Menezes	7–5, 6–2
Win	6–1	Jun 2015	USA F18, Rochester	Futures	Clay	(United States) Sekou Bangoura	7–6^{(7–3)}, 6–4
Win	7–1	Jul 2015	USA F20, Pittsburgh	Futures	Clay	(Denmark) Mikael Torpegaard	6–4, 6–4
Win	8–1	Nov 2017	USA F37, Pensacola	Futures	Clay	(United States) Ulises Blanch	3–6, 7–5, 6–1
Loss	8–2	Jan 2018	USA F2, Long Beach	Futures	Hard	(United States) Collin Altamirano	1–6, 5–7
Win	9–2	Jul 2018	Ecuador F1, Manta	Futures	Hard	(United States) Jordi Arconada	6–2, 7–5
Win	10–2	Aug 2018	Ecuador F2, Portoviejo	Futures	Clay	(Brazil) Oscar José Gutierrez	4–6, 7–5, 6–4
Loss	10–3	Apr 2019	Monterrey, Mexico	Challenger	Hard	(Kazakhstan) Alexander Bublik	3–6, 2–6
Win	11–3	Apr 2019	Tallahassee, USA	Challenger	Clay	(United States) Tommy Paul	6–2, 6–2
Win	12–3	Apr 2021	Salinas, Ecuador	Challenger	Hard	(Chile) Nicolás Jarry	4–6, 7–6^{(8–6)}, 6–4
Loss	12–4	Jun 2021	Little Rock, USA	Challenger	Hard	(United States) Jack Sock	5–7, 4–6
Win	13–4	Apr 2022	Salinas, Ecuador	Challenger	Hard	(United States) Nicolas Moreno de Alboran	6–7^{(2–7)}, 7–6^{(7–4)}, 7–5
Loss	13–5	Jul 2022	Málaga, Spain	Challenger	Hard	(France) Constant Lestienne	3–6, 7–5, 2–6
Win	14–5	Jul 2022	Winnipeg, Canada	Challenger	Hard	(Canada) Alexis Galarneau	6–3, 7–6^{(7–4)}
Loss	14–6	Aug 2022	Lexington, USA	Challenger	Hard	(China) Shang Juncheng	4–6, 4–6
Loss	14–7	Sep 2022	Columbus, USA	Challenger	Hard (i)	(Australia) Jordan Thompson	6–7^{(6–8)}, 2–6
Loss	14–8	Oct 2022	Gwangju, South Korea	Challenger	Hard	(Hungary) Zsombor Piros	2–6, 4–6

=== Doubles: 22 (12–10) ===
Legend (doubles) ATP Challenger Tour (2–3) ITF Futures Tour (10–7)	Titles by surface Hard (6–4) Clay (6–6) Grass (0–0) Carpet (0–0)

Result	W–L	Date	Tournament	Tier	Surface	Partner	Opponents	Score
Win	1–0	Oct 2009	Brazil F22, Bauru	Futures	Clay	(Ecuador) Roberto Quiroz	(Argentina) Juan-Pablo Amado (Brazil) André Miele	6–4, 0–6, [10–8]
Win	2–0	Nov 2009	Guayaquil, Ecuador	Challenger	Clay	(Ecuador) Julio César Campozano	(Austria) Andreas Haider-Maurer (Germany) Lars Pörschke	6–7^{(2–7)}, 6–3, [10–8]
Win	3–0	Jan 2010	El Salvador F1, Santa Tecla	Futures	Clay	(Ecuador) Julio César Campozano	(United States) Conor Pollock (United States) Maciek Sykut	6–4, 7–6^{(7–4)}
Loss	3–1	Nov 2010	Peru F3, Lima	Futures	Clay	(Ecuador) Julio César Campozano	(Brazil) Diego Matos (Argentina) Renzo Olivo	3–6, 6–3, [3–10]
Loss	3–2	Aug 2011	Ecuador F4, Guayaquil	Futures	Hard	(Ecuador) Julio César Campozano	(Ecuador) Iván Endara (Ecuador) Roberto Quiroz	6–7^{(4–7)}, 6–2, [7–10]
Win	4–2	Aug 2012	Ecuador F1, Guayaquil	Futures	Hard	(Ecuador) Roberto Quiroz	(Mexico) Miguel Gallardo Valles (Venezuela) Luis David Martínez	6–4, 7–6^{(7–4)}
Win	5–2	Aug 2012	Ecuador F2, Guayaquil	Futures	Hard	(Ecuador) Roberto Quiroz	(Peru) Sergio Galdós (Dominican Republic) José Hernández-Fernández	7–5, 6–2
Win	6–2	Jul 2013	Medellín, Colombia	Challenger	Clay	(Moldova) Roman Borvanov	(Colombia) Nicolás Barrientos (Colombia) Eduardo Struvay	6–3, 7–6^{(7–4)}
Win	7–2	Aug 2013	Ecuador F2, Guayaquil	Futures	Hard	(Ecuador) Roberto Quiroz	(Peru) Nicolás Álvarez (Peru) Duilio Beretta	6–1, 6–4
Loss	7–3	Feb 2014	Guatemala F1, Guatemala City	Futures	Hard	(Venezuela) Luis David Martínez	(El Salvador) Marcelo Arévalo (Guatemala) Christopher Díaz Figueroa	3–6, 6–7^{(5–7)}
Win	8–3	Oct 2014	Peru F8, Lima	Futures	Clay	(Ecuador) Gonzalo Escobar	(Brazil) Eduardo Dischinger (Brazil) Tiago Lopes	6–3, 6–2
Loss	8–4	Dec 2014	Dominican Republic F3, Santo Domingo	Futures	Clay	(Mexico) Manuel Sánchez	(Peru) Duilio Beretta (Bolivia) Hugo Dellien	7–6^{(11–9)}, 4–6, [4–10]
Loss	8–5	Jan 2015	USA F3, Sunrise	Futures	Clay	(United States) Connor Smith	(Monaco) Romain Arneodo (Monaco) Benjamin Balleret	2–6, 5–7
Loss	8–6	Feb 2015	Morelos, Mexico	Challenger	Hard	(Venezuela) Roberto Maytín	(Philippines) Ruben Gonzales (United Kingdom) Darren Walsh	6–4, 3–6, [10–12]
Loss	8–7	May 2015	Cali, Colombia	Challenger	Clay	(Venezuela) Roberto Maytín	(Brazil) Marcelo Demoliner (Mexico) Miguel Ángel Reyes-Varela	1–6, 2–6
Win	9–7	Aug 2015	Brazil F4, Belém	Futures	Hard	(Brazil) Igor Marcondes	(Brazil) André Miele (Brazil) Alexandre Tsuchiya	6–7^{(5–7)}, 7–6^{(7–3)}, [16–14]
Win	10–7	Nov 2015	El Salvador F2, La Libertad	Futures	Hard	(Barbados) Darian King	(El Salvador) Marcelo Arévalo (Guatemala) Christopher Díaz Figueroa	6–3, 7–6^{(12–10)}
Loss	10–8	May 2016	Romania F4, Bacău	Futures	Clay	(Colombia) Nicolás Barrientos	(Germany) Andreas Mies (Germany) Oscar Otte	3–6, 3–6
Loss	10–9	Jul 2018	USA F18, Pittsburgh	Futures	Clay	(Colombia) Alejandro Gómez	(Argentina) Mateo Nicolás Martínez (United States) Junior Alexander Ore	5–7, 2–6
Win	11–9	Jul 2018	Ecuador F1, Manta	Futures	Hard	(United States) Jordi Arconada	(Brazil) Oscar José Gutierrez (Portugal) Bernardo Saraiva	7–5, 6–3
Win	12–9	Aug 2018	Ecuador F2, Portoviejo	Futures	Clay	(United States) Jordi Arconada	(Colombia) Juan Sebastián Gómez (Brazil) Diego Matos	6–4, 6–3
Loss	12–10	Jan 2019	United States M25, Los Angeles	World Tennis Tour	Hard	(Mexico) Luis Patiño	(Moldova) Alexander Cozbinov (United States) Maxime Cressy	4–6, 2–6
Loss	12–11	Jul 2022	Málaga, Spain	Challenger	Hard	(Israel) Daniel Cukierman	(Turkey) Altuğ Çelikbilek (Kazakhstan) Dmitry Popko	7–6^{(7–4)}, 4–6, [6–10]

== Record against other players ==
Gómez's match record against players who have been ranked in the top 50, with those who are active in boldface.
ATP Tour, Challenger and Future tournaments' main draw and qualifying matches are considered.

Opponent	Highest ranking	Matches	Won	Lost	Win %	Last match
(Switzerland) **Stan Wawrinka**	3	1	0	1	0%	Lost (4–6, 3–6, 3–6) at 2013 Davis Cup WG PO
(South Africa) **Kevin Anderson**	5	1	0	1	0%	Lost (3–6, 6–7^{(2–7)}) at 2013 Bogotá 2R
(United States) **Jack Sock**	8	1	0	1	0%	Lost (5–7, 4–6) at 2021 Little Rock F
(France) **Lucas Pouille**	10	1	0	1	0%	Lost (7–6^{(10–8)}, 4–6, 5–7) at 2016 Toronto 1R
(Norway) **Casper Ruud**	10	1	1	0	100%	Won (6–2, 6–4) at 2019 Monterrey 2R
(Croatia) **Ivo Karlović**	14	1	0	1	0%	Lost (6–7^{(1–7)}, 3–6) at 2018 Houston 2R
(Georgia (country)) **Nikoloz Basilashvili**	16	1	0	1	0%	Lost (4–6, 5–7) at 2016 Tallahassee 1R
(Italy) **Marco Cecchinato**	16	1	0	1	0%	Lost (2–6, 3–6) at 2016 Milan 2R
(Spain) **Albert Ramos Viñolas**	17	1	0	1	0%	Lost (3–6, 6–7^{(5–7)}) at 2014 Panama City 1R
(Chile) **Cristian Garín**	17	2	2	0	100%	Won (7–5, 6–4) at 2018 United States F1 1R
(Germany) Florian Mayer	18	1	0	1	0%	Lost (3–6, 4–6) at 2016 Geneva Q1
(Brazil) **Thomaz Bellucci**	17	3	0	3	0%	Lost (2–6, 6–3, 4–6) at 2018 Guayaquil 1R
(Argentina) **Leonardo Mayer**	21	2	0	2	0%	Lost (2–6, 4–6) at 2013 Guayaquil QF
(Bosnia and Herzegovina) **Damir Džumhur**	23	1	0	1	0%	Lost (7–5, 3–6, 2–6) at 2021 Australian Open Q1
(United States) **Reilly Opelka**	19	1	0	1	0%	Lost (2–6, 3–6) at 2018 Knoxville 1R
(United Kingdom) **Daniel Evans**	22	1	0	1	0%	Lost (4–6, 7–6^{(7–5)}, 1–6) at 2016 Aptos 2R
(Canada) **Vasek Pospisil**	25	1	0	1	0%	Lost (6–4, 3–6, 3–6) at 2021 Washington 1R
(Italy) **Lorenzo Sonego**	17	1	0	1	0%	Lost (7–6^{(8–6)}, 3–6, 1–6, 7–6^{(7–4)}, 3–6) at **2020 French Open** 1R
(Colombia) **Santiago Giraldo**	28	1	0	1	0%	Lost (2–6, 2–6) at 2009 Guayaquil 1R
(United States) **Frances Tiafoe**	29	3	0	3	0%	Lost (6–7^{(3–7)}, 2–6) at 2020 Delray Beach 1R
(Ukraine) **Sergiy Stakhovsky**	31	1	0	1	0%	Lost (4–6, 6–7^{(6–8)}) at 2018 Manacor 1R
(Argentina) **Federico Delbonis**	33	3	0	3	0%	Lost (3–6, 3–6) at 2019 Perugia 3R
(Italy) **Paolo Lorenzi**	33	1	0	1	0%	Lost (4–6, 6–7^{(5–7)}) at 2019 Sarasota 2R
(Germany) Benjamin Becker	35	1	0	1	0%	Lost (3–6, 6–7^{(0–7)}) at 2016 Monterrey 2R
(Kazakhstan) **Alexander Bublik**	34	2	1	1	50%	Lost (3–6, 2–6) at 2019 Monterrey F
(Belgium) Steve Darcis	38	1	0	1	0%	Lost (1–6 0–2 ret.) at 2014 US Open Q3
(Chile) **Nicolás Jarry**	38	2	2	0	100%	Won (4–6, 7–6^{(8–6)}, 6–4) at 2021 Salinas F
(Serbia) **Miomir Kecmanović**	38	1	0	1	0%	Lost (1–6, 6–4, 3–6) at 2017 San Luis Potosí 2R
(United States) **Donald Young**	38	1	1	0	100%	Won (2–6, 6–3, 6–4) at 2019 Monterrey SF
(Kazakhstan) **Mikhail Kukushkin**	39	1	0	1	0%	Lost (2–6, 0–3 ret.) at 2016 Moscow SF
(Argentina) **Horacio Zeballos**	39	1	0	1	0%	Lost (4–6, 4–6) at 2016 Montevideo 1R
(Netherlands) **Thiemo de Bakker**	40	2	1	1	50%	Lost (5–7, 3–6) at 2015 Indian Wells Q1
(Tunisia) **Malek Jaziri**	42	1	0	1	0%	Lost (2–6, 4–6) at 2014 Cuernavaca 1R
(Dominican Republic) Víctor Estrella Burgos	43	4	1	3	25%	Lost (6–3, 1–6, 4–6) at 2017 Guayaquil 1R
(Russia) **Teymuraz Gabashvili**	43	1	1	0	100%	Won (7–6^{(9–7)}, 1–6, 6–4) at 2020 St. Petersburg Q1
(Slovakia) **Lukáš Lacko**	44	1	0	1	0%	Lost (6–7^{(6–8)}, 6–4, 3–6) at 2019 Recanati 3R
(Germany) **Maximilian Marterer**	45	1	0	1	0%	Lost (1–6, 1–6) at 2017 Monterrey 1R
(Japan) **Go Soeda**	47	1	1	0	100%	Won (7–5, 7–6^{(7–5)}) at 2020 Davis Cup WQ
(Spain) **Daniel Gimeno Traver**	48	1	1	0	100%	Won (6–4, 6–1) at 2019 French Open Q1
(Argentina) **Juan Ignacio Londero**	50	3	1	2	33%	Won (7–6^{(7–5)}, 3–6, 7–6^{(7–4)}) at 2016 León Q3
Total		56	13	43	23%	* Statistics correct as of 3 August 2021
