= Ernesto Escobedo =

Mexican-American tennis player

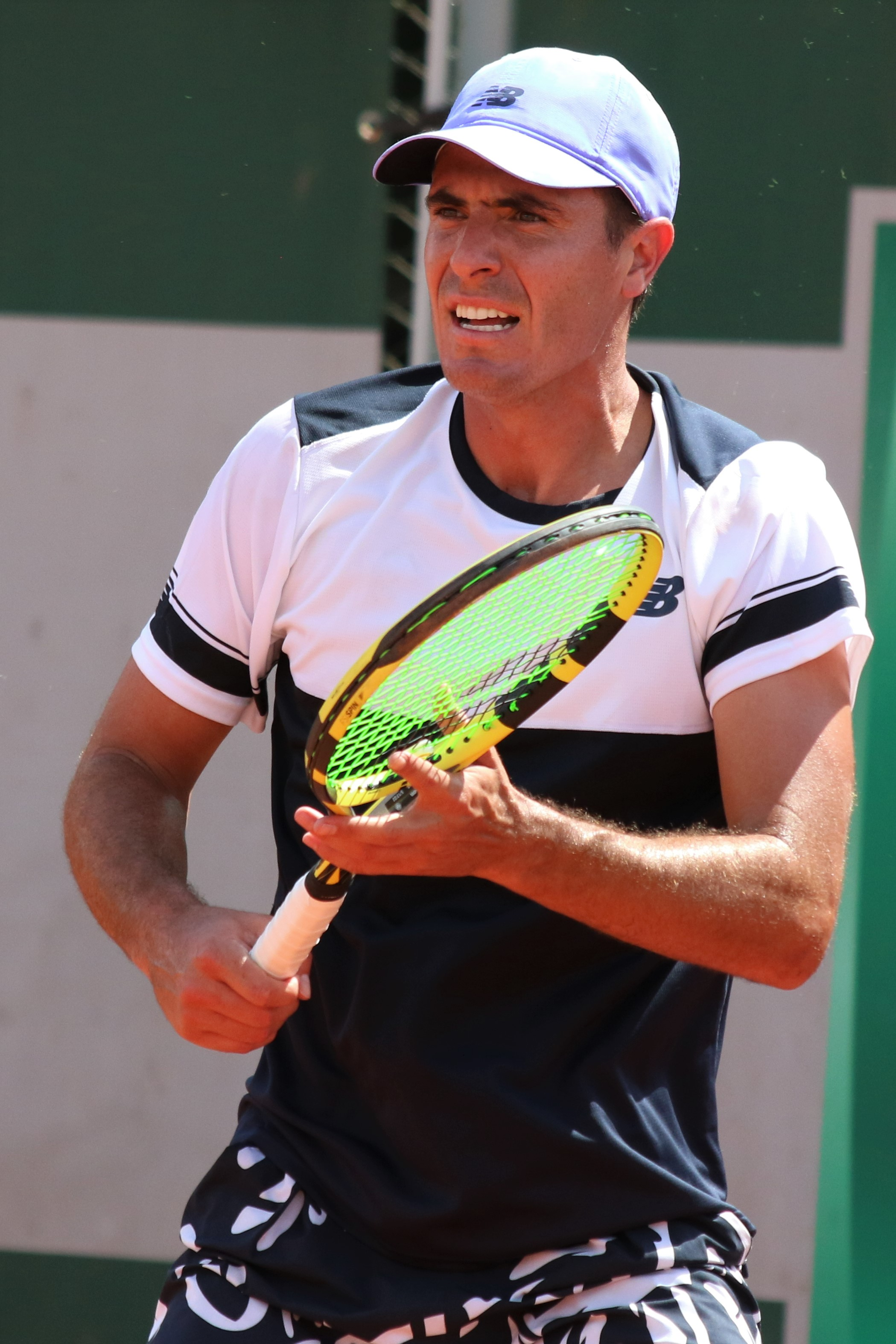
- Escobedo at the 2022 French Open
- Country (sports): United States (2014–2022) Mexico (2023–2025)
- Residence: West Covina, California, USA
- Born: 4 July 1996 (age 30) Los Angeles, California, USA
- Height: 1.85 m (6 ft 1 in)
- Turned pro: 2014
- Retired: Mar 2025
- Plays: Right-handed (two-handed backhand)
- Prize money: US $1,586,166

Singles
- Career record: 21–42
- Career titles: 0
- Highest ranking: No. 67 (17 July 2017)

Grand Slam singles results
- Australian Open: 2R (2017)
- French Open: 1R (2017)
- Wimbledon: 1R (2017)
- US Open: 2R (2016, 2020, 2021)

Doubles
- Career record: 1–5
- Career titles: 0
- Highest ranking: No. 296 (16 May 2022)

Grand Slam doubles results
- French Open: 2R (2017)
- US Open: 1R (2020)

Ernesto "Neto" Escobedo III (/ˈnɛtoʊ ˌɛskəˈbeɪdoʊ/ NET-oh ES-kə-BAYD-oh; Spanish: [eɾˈnesto ˈneto eskoˈβeðo], born 4 July 1996) is a Mexican-American former professional tennis player who had a career-high ATP singles ranking of world No. 67, achieved on 17 July 2017 and a best doubles ranking of No. 296, achieved on 16 May 2022.

== Personal life ==
Escobedo began playing tennis at the age of 4. His father Ernesto Jr. briefly played professional tennis, and his aunt Xóchitl Escobedo was a Top 300 player who competed in the 1988 Olympics. He is of Mexican descent. Escobedo's cousin Emilio Nava is also a professional tennis player.

== Career ==
=== 2016: Major debut & first win at the US Open, multiple Challenger titles, Top 200 ===
Escobedo reached his first ATP Challenger final at São Paulo in April 2016 to advance him to a career-high ranking inside the top 300. With that success, he became the seventh American teenager to reach a Challenger final in the previous seven months.

He won his first career ATP match at the Aegon Open in Nottingham against top 100 player Diego Schwartzman shortly before turning 20 years old. The next month, he won his first Challenger title at Lexington over fellow up-and-coming American Frances Tiafoe. With this victory, he also won the 2016 US Open Wild Card Challenge to earn a wildcard into the main draw of the final Grand Slam of the year. Escobedo put this wildcard to good use by defeating Lukáš Lacko in the first round to crack the Top 200 for the first time and record his first career Grand Slam match win.

Towards the end of the season, Escobedo returned to Monterrey where he had made the semifinals the previous year, and defended his points by winning the title over Denis Kudla.

=== 2017: Australian second round, Masters & Top 100 debuts ===
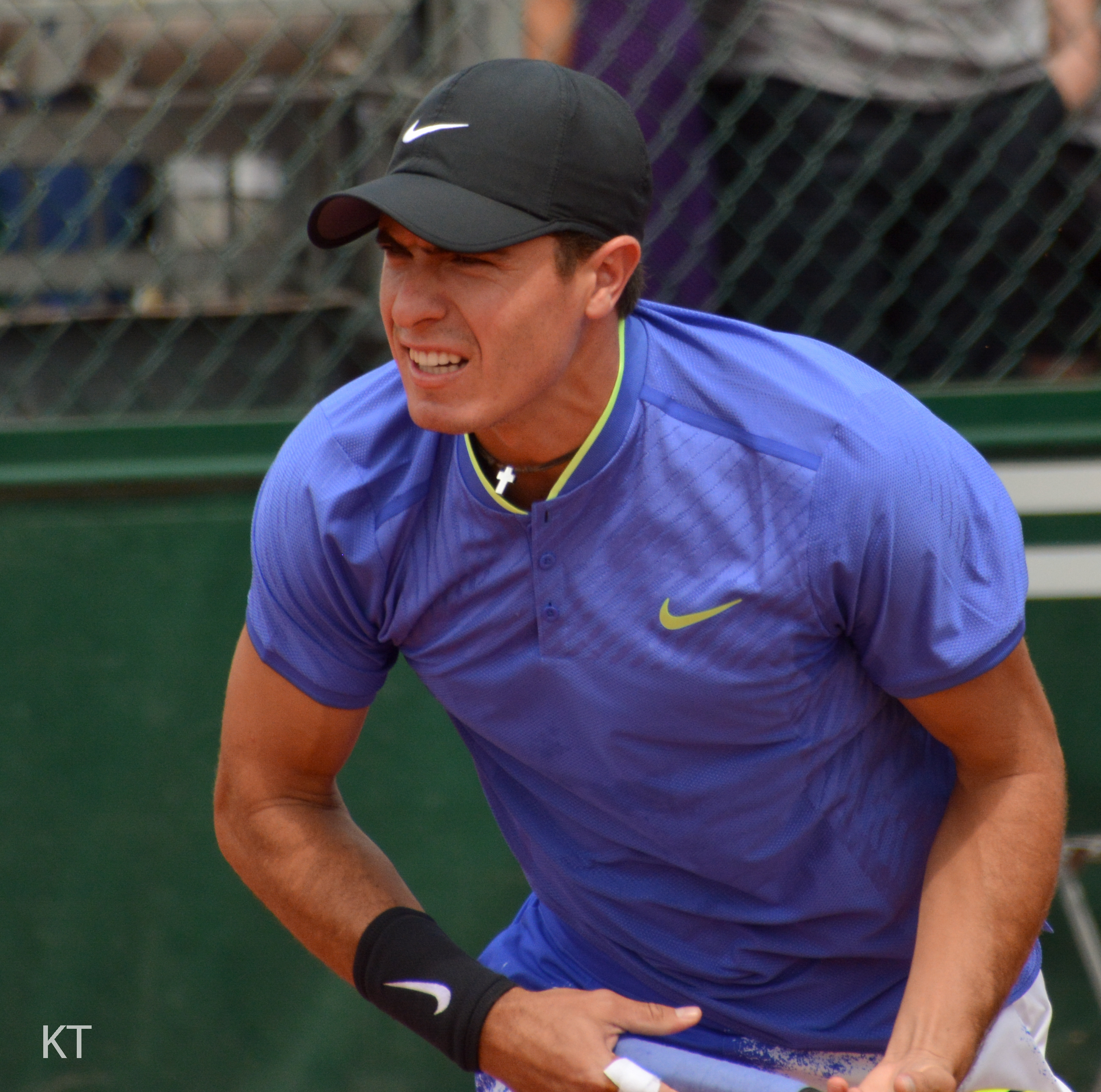
Escobedo at the 2017 French Open

To start the year, Escobedo continued to improve upon his success from 2016. He qualified for the Australian Open and then won his first round match against fellow NextGen player Daniil Medvedev.

The following month, he was awarded a wildcard into the Abierto Mexicano Telcel, an ATP 500 event in Acapulco. At this tournament, he again won first round match over fellow American Stefan Kozlov.

In March, Escobedo was able to qualify for his first Masters event at the 2017 Miami Open, where he upset No. 43 Dan Evans to break through into the top 100 of the ATP rankings. To start the clay court season, Escobedo played at the U.S. Men's Clay Court Championships in Houston and reached his first career ATP quarterfinal and semifinal, climbing to a then career-high ranking of No. 73 with this success. His tournament was highlighted by a quarterfinal win over No. 2 seed and fellow American John Isner.

Escobedo was part of the NextGen players that included many fellow Americans such as Frances Tiafoe and Taylor Fritz, who were regarded as the leading young prospects expected to form the next generation of American tennis stars.

=== 2018: First top 10 and Masters wins ===
In February, Escobedo was able to qualify for the Abierto Mexicano Telcel in Acapulco. He defeated top-ranked American Jack Sock in the first round for his first Top 10 win, continuing his success at tournaments in Mexico. In March, Escobedo was given a wildcard for the first time to the main draw of the 2018 Indian Wells Masters where he defeated compatriot Frances Tiafoe, before falling to the 28th seed Feliciano López.

=== 2020–2021: Return to US Open second round in 4 years and Masters in 3 years ===
After the suspension of the 2020 season due to COVID, Escobedo returned to the 2020 US Open as an alternate, replacing Benoit Paire, who tested COVID positive, where he defeated Kamil Majchrzak in the first round.

In March 2021, Escobedo qualified for the 2021 Miami Open and defeated Paolo Lorenzi in the first round before losing to 16th seed Dušan Lajović.

=== 2022: Fourth Challenger title ===
Escobedo won the title at the 2022 Bendigo International Challenger in Australia, his first in three years. He entered the 2022 Australian Open as a lucky loser.

=== 2023-2024: Representing Mexico as No. 1 player ===
In January 2023, Escobedo stopped representing the United States in favor of representing Mexico in tournaments and became the Mexican No. 1 player. He qualified for the 2023 Australian Open.

Escobedo received a wildcard for the qualifying draw of the 2023 Abierto Mexicano Telcel in Acapulco but lost to Brandon Holt.

In the next season, he received wildcards for the main draw of the 2024 Los Cabos Open and for the 2024 Abierto Mexicano Telcel.

=== 2025: Retirement ===
Escobedo played a challenger and two ITF events in 2025. On March 27, 2025, he announced his retirement on Instagram.

== Performance timeline ==
Key
W	F	SF	QF	#R	RR	Q#	DNQ	A	NH

(W) winner; (F) finalist; (SF) semifinalist; (QF) quarterfinalist; (#R) rounds 4, 3, 2, 1; (RR) round-robin stage; (Q#) qualification round; (DNQ) did not qualify; (A) absent; (NH) not held; (SR) strike rate (events won / competed); (W–L) win–loss record.
To avoid confusion and double counting, these charts are updated at the conclusion of a tournament or when the player's participation has ended.

Current through the 2024 Los Cabos Open.

	United States									(Mexico)				
Tournament	2014	2015	2016	2017	2018	2019	2020	2021	2022	2023	2024	SR	W–L	Win%
Grand Slam tournaments
Australian Open	A	A	A	2R	Q3	Q1	Q2	Q1	1R	1R	A	0 / 3	1–3	25%
French Open	A	A	A	1R	Q1	A	A	Q2	Q2	A	A	0 / 1	0–1	0%
Wimbledon	A	A	A	1R	A	A	NH	Q1	Q1	A	A	0 / 1	0–1	0%
US Open	Q3	A	2R	1R	Q2	1R	2R	2R	Q1	A	A	0 / 5	3–5	38%
Win–loss	0–0	0–0	1–1	1–4	0–0	0–1	1–1	1–1	0–1	0–1	0–0	0 / 10	4–10	29%
ATP World Tour Masters 1000
Indian Wells Masters	A	A	Q1	Q1	2R	A	NH	2R	A	A	A	0 / 2	2–2	50%
Miami Open	A	A	A	2R	Q2	A	NH	2R	A	A	A	0 / 2	2–2	50%
Madrid Open	A	A	A	1R	A	A	NH	A	A	A	A	0 / 1	0–1	0%
Italian Open	A	A	A	1R	A	A	A	A	A	A	A	0 / 1	0–1	0%
Canadian Open	A	A	A	2R	A	A	NH	A	A	A	A	0 / 1	1–1	50%
Cincinnati Masters	A	A	A	Q1	A	A	A	A	A	A	A	0 / 0	0–0	–
Win–loss	0–0	0–0	0–0	2–4	1–1	0–0	0–0	2–2	0–0	0–0	0–0	0 / 7	5–7	42%
Career statistics
Tournaments	0	0	4	15	8	1	1	4	2	2	2	Career total: 39		
Overall win–loss	0–0	0–0	2–4	9–15	3–8	0–1	1–1	5–4	0–2	1–3	0–4	0 / 39	21–42	33%
Year-end ranking	538	393	141	120	187	224	198	165	226	405	460	$1,588,064		

== ATP Challenger Tour finals ==
=== Singles: 6 (4 titles, 2 runner-ups) ===
Legend ATP Challenger Tour (4–2)	Finals by surface Hard (4–1) Clay (0–1)

Result	W–L	Date	Tournament	Tier	Surface	Opponent	Score
Loss	0–1	Apr 2016	São Paulo Challenger, Brazil	Challenger	Clay	(Chile) Gonzalo Lama	2–6, 2–6
Win	1–1	Jul 2016	Lexington Challenger, US	Challenger	Hard	(United States) Frances Tiafoe	6–2, 6–7^{(6–8)}, 7–6^{(7–3)}
Loss	1–2	Sep 2016	Cary Tennis Classic, US	Challenger	Hard	(Republic of Ireland) James McGee	6–1, 1–6, 4–6
Win	2–2	Oct 2016	Monterrey Challenger, Mexico	Challenger	Hard	(United States) Denis Kudla	6–4, 6–4
Win	3–2	Jul 2019	Challenger de Granby, Canada	Challenger	Hard	(Japan) Yasutaka Uchiyama	7–6^{(7–5)}, 6–4
Win	4–2	Jan 2022	Bendigo Tennis International, Australia	Challenger	Hard	(France) Enzo Couacaud	5–7, 6–3, 7–5

=== Doubles: 1 (title) ===
Legend ATP Challenger Tour (1–0)

Result	W–L	Date	Tournament	Tier	Surface	Partner	Opponents	Score
Win	1–0	Jun 2021	Little Rock Challenger, US	Challenger	Hard	(Colombia) Nicolás Barrientos	(United States) Christopher Eubanks (Ecuador) Roberto Quiroz	4–6, 6–3, [10–5]

== ITF Futures/World Tennis Tour finals ==
=== Singles: 7 (2 titles, 5 runner-ups) ===
Legend ITF Futures/WTT (2–5)	Finals by surface Hard (2–5) Clay (0–0)

Result	W–L	Date	Tournament	Tier	Surface	Opponent	Score
Loss	0–1	Sep 2013	US F24, Costa Mesa	Futures	Hard	(Tunisia) Haythem Abid	1–6, 6–4, 5–7
Loss	0–2	Nov 2013	Mexico F19, Mérida	Futures	Hard	(United States) Nicolas Meister	7–6^{(7–4)}, 1–6, 6–7^{(7–9)}
Loss	0–3	May 2015	Mexico F4, Córdoba	Futures	Hard	(Barbados) Darian King	5–7, 7–5, 4–6
Loss	0–4	Jun 2015	US F16B, Charlottesville	Futures	Hard	(United States) Tennys Sandgren	4–6, 4–6
Loss	0–5	Sep 2015	US F27, Costa Mesa	Futures	Hard	(United States) Ryan Shane	4–6, 3–6
Win	1–5	May 2023	M25 Xalapa, Mexico	WTT	Hard	(United States) Aidan Mayo	6–3, 6–4
Win	2–5	May 2024	M15 Villahermosa, Mexico	WTT	Hard	(Mexico) Rodrigo Pacheco Méndez	6–3, 7–5

== Wins over top 10 players ==
- Escobedo's record against players who were, at the time the match was played, ranked in the top 10.

Season	2018	Total
Wins	1	1

#	Player	Rank	Event	Surface	Rd	Score	EER
2018
1.	(United States) Jack Sock	10	Mexican Open, Mexico	Hard	1R	7–5, 7–6^{(7–3)}	123
