= Lucas Gómez (tennis) =

Mexican tennis player (born 1995)

- Country (sports): Mexico
- Residence: Tijuana, Mexico
- Born: 11 August 1995 (age 30) Tijuana, Mexico
- Height: 1.78 m (5 ft 10 in)
- Plays: Left-handed (two-handed backhand)
- Coach: Marcos Gorriz
- Prize money: $127,942

Singles
- Career record: 3–13 (at ATP Tour level, Grand Slam level, and in Davis Cup)
- Career titles: 0; 0 Challenger, 0 Futures
- Highest ranking: No. 463 (4 April 2016)

Doubles
- Career record: 0–2 (at ATP Tour level, Grand Slam level, and in Davis Cup)
- Career titles: 0; 0 Challenger, 3 Futures
- Highest ranking: No. 526 (16 July 2018)

Team competitions
- Davis Cup: 0–3
- Last updated on: 17 June 2021.

Lucas Gómez (Latin American Spanish: [ˈlukas ˈɣomes]; (Note: In isolation, Gómez is pronounced [ˈɡomes].) born 11 August 1995) is a Mexican professional tennis player.

Gómez has a career high ATP singles ranking of World No. 463, achieved on 4 April 2016. He also has a career high ATP doubles ranking of World No. 526 achieved on 16 July 2018. Gómez made his ATP main draw debut at the 2016 Abierto Mexicano Telcel, where he received a wildcard into the singles draw. Playing for Mexico in Davis Cup, Gómez has a career win–loss ratio of 0–3.

== ATP Challenger and ITF Futures finals ==
=== Singles: 3 (0–3) ===
Legend ATP Challenger (0–0) ITF Futures (0–3)	Finals by surface Hard (0–3) Clay (0–0) Grass (0–0) Carpet (0–0)

Result	W–L	Date	Tournament	Tier	Surface	Opponent	Score
Loss	0–1	Jun 2015	Mexico F7, Manzanillo	Futures	Hard	(United States) Clay Thompson	2–6, 3–6
Loss	0–2	Oct 2015	USA F30, Houston	Futures	Hard	(United States) Michael Mmoh	3–6, 2–6
Loss	0–3	Aug 2016	Indonesia F2, Makassar	Futures	Hard	(Indonesia) Christopher Rungkat	3–6, 6–3, 0–6

=== Doubles: 9 (3–6) ===
Legend ATP Challenger (0–1) ITF Futures (3–5)	Finals by surface Hard (1–3) Clay (2–3) Grass (0–0) Carpet (0–0)

Result	W–L	Date	Tournament	Tier	Surface	Partner	Opponents	Score
Loss	0–1	Jul 2014	Mexico F8, Quintana Roo	Futures	Hard	(Peru) Duilio Vallebuona	(Peru) Mauricio Echazú (Peru) Jorge Brian Panta	1–6, 6–7^{(1–7)}
Loss	0–2	Feb 2015	Turkey F5, Antalya	Futures	Hard	(Israel) Dekel Bar	(Bulgaria) Dimitar Kuzmanov (Venezuela) Ricardo Rodriguez	6–2, 3–6, [8–10]
Win	1–2	May 2015	Mexico F2, Querétaro	Futures	Hard	(Ecuador) Iván Endara	(United States) Oscar Fabian Matthews (United States) Hunter Nicholas	6–1, 6–4
Win	2–2	May 2016	Romania F2, Galați	Futures	Clay	(Argentina) Juan Pablo Paz	(Lithuania) Laurynas Grigelis (Lithuania) Lukas Mugevicius	6–4, 4–6, [11–9]
Loss	2–3	Jun 2017	Bosnia & Herzegovina F2, Brčko	Futures	Clay	(Argentina) Franco Agamenone	(Australia) Adam Taylor (Australia) Jason Taylor	6–7^{(3–7)}, 1–6
Loss	2–4	Jun 2017	Bosnia & Herzegovina F3, Kiseljak	Futures	Clay	(Italy) Erik Crepaldi	(Croatia) Antun Vidak (Bosnia and Herzegovina) Nerman Fatić	4–6, 6–2, [4–10]
Loss	2–5	Jul 2017	Tampere, Finland	Challenger	Clay	(Argentina) Juan Ignacio Londero	(Belgium) Sander Gillé (Belgium) Joran Vliegen	2–6, 7–6^{(7–5)}, [3–10]
Loss	2–6	Nov 2017	Greece F10, Heraklion	Futures	Hard	(Italy) Marco Bortolotti	(Turkey) Altuğ Çelikbilek (Guatemala) Christopher Díaz Figueroa	2–6, 2–6
Win	3–6	Jun 2018	USA F14, Buffalo	Futures	Clay	(Colombia) Alejandro Gomez	(Argentina) Matias Franco Descotte (Argentina) Eduardo Agustin Torre	6–3, 6–4
