= Monterrey Challenger =

Monterrey Abierto GNP Seguros

Defunct tennis tournament
- Event name: Monterrey Open (2015–2016); Abierto GNP Seguros(2017–2023)
- Location: Monterrey, Mexico
- Venue: Club Sonoma
- Category: ATP Challenger 110 (2015–2016); ATP Challenger 125 (2018–2019, 2023); ATP Challenger 100 (2017, 2020–2022)
- Surface: Hard
- Draw: 32S/24Q/16D
- Prize money: $160,000 (2023)
- Website: Abierto GNP Seguros

Current champions (2023)
- Singles: (Portugal) Nuno Borges
- Doubles: (Sweden) André Göransson (Japan) Ben McLachlan

The Monterrey Abierto GNP Seguros was a professional tennis tournament played on hardcourts. It was part of the ATP Challenger Tour. It was held annually in Monterrey, Mexico since 2015.

== Past finals ==
=== Singles ===
Year	Champion	Runner-up	Score
2023	(Portugal) Nuno Borges	(Croatia) Borna Gojo	6–4, 7–6^{(8–6)}
2022	(Spain) Fernando Verdasco	(India) Prajnesh Gunneswaran	4–6, 6–3, 7–6^{(7–3)}
2021	Not held due to COVID-19 pandemic		
2020	(France) Adrian Mannarino	(Australia) Aleksandar Vukic	6–1, 6–3
2019	(Kazakhstan) Alexander Bublik	(Ecuador) Emilio Gómez	6–3, 6–2
2018	(Spain) David Ferrer	(Croatia) Ivo Karlović	6–3, 6–4
2017	(Germany) Maximilian Marterer	(United States) Bradley Klahn	7–6^{(7–3)}, 7–6^{(8–6)}
2016	(United States) Ernesto Escobedo	(United States) Denis Kudla	6–4, 6–4
2015	(Netherlands) Thiemo de Bakker	(Dominican Republic) Víctor Estrella Burgos	7–6^{(7–1)}, 4–6, 6–3

=== Doubles ===
Year	Champions	Runners-up	Score
2023	(Sweden) André Göransson (Japan) Ben McLachlan	(Venezuela) Luis David Martínez (Colombia) Cristian Rodríguez	6–3, 6–4
2022	(Mexico) Hans Hach Verdugo (United States) Austin Krajicek	(United States) Robert Galloway (Australia) John-Patrick Smith	6–0, 6–3
2021	Not held due to COVID-19 pandemic		
2020	(Poland) Karol Drzewiecki (Portugal) Gonçalo Oliveira	(Brazil) Orlando Luz (Brazil) Rafael Matos	6–7^{(5–7)}, 6–4, [11–9]
2019	(United States) Evan King (3) (United States) Nathan Pasha	(Mexico) Santiago González (Pakistan) Aisam-ul-Haq Qureshi	7–5, 6–2
2018	(El Salvador) Marcelo Arévalo (India) Jeevan Nedunchezhiyan	(India) Leander Paes (Mexico) Miguel Ángel Reyes-Varela	6–1, 6–4
2017	(United States) Christopher Eubanks (United States) Evan King (2)	(El Salvador) Marcelo Arévalo (Mexico) Miguel Ángel Reyes-Varela	7–6^{(7–4)}, 6–3
2016	(United States) Evan King (1) (United States) Denis Kudla	(Australia) Jarryd Chaplin (New Zealand) Ben McLachlan	7–5, 6–2
2015	(Netherlands) Thiemo de Bakker (Netherlands) Mark Vervoort	(Italy) Paolo Lorenzi (Brazil) Fernando Romboli	Walkover

== See also ==
- ATP Challenger Tour
- Monterrey Open
