= 2018 Torneo Internacional Challenger León – Singles =

Singles
- 2018 Torneo Internacional Challenger León

Final
- Champion: (United States) Christopher Eubanks
- Runner-up: (Australia) John-Patrick Smith
- Score: 6–4, 3–6, 7–6^{(7–4)}

Events
Singles	Doubles
← 2017 ·	Torneo Internacional Challenger León	· 2019 →

Adrián Menéndez Maceiras was the defending champion but lost in the second round to John-Patrick Smith.

Christopher Eubanks won the title after defeating Smith 6–4, 3–6, 7–6^{(7–4)} in the final.

== Seeds ==
1. (Spain) Adrián Menéndez Maceiras (second round)
2. (Germany) Mats Moraing (first round, retired)
3. (United States) Dennis Novikov (second round)
4. (Dominican Republic) Víctor Estrella Burgos (first round)
5. (United States) Kevin King (first round)
6. (Barbados) Darian King (second round)
7. (Canada) Filip Peliwo (quarterfinals)
8. (El Salvador) Marcelo Arévalo (first round)

== Draw ==
=== Key ===
- Q = Qualifier
- WC = Wild card
- LL = Lucky loser
- Alt = Alternate
- SE = Special exempt
- PR = Protected ranking
- ITF = ITF entry
- JE = Junior exempt
- w/o = Walkover
- r = Retired
- d = Defaulted
- SR = Special ranking

=== Finals ===
Semifinals
(Australia) John-Patrick Smith	6	6
(Colombia) Alejandro González	4	3
(United States) Christopher Eubanks	4	6	6
Q	(Ecuador) Roberto Quiroz	6	4	3

Final
(Australia) John-Patrick Smith	4	6	6^{4}
(United States) Christopher Eubanks	6	3	7^{7}

=== Top half ===
First round
1	(Spain) A Menéndez Maceiras	7	7^{7}
(Bosnia and Herzegovina) A Šetkić	5	6^{2}
(Israel) E Leshem	6^{4}	0
(Australia) J-P Smith	7^{7}	6
Q	(United Kingdom) J Ward	6	6
WC	(Mexico) José Antonio Rodríguez Rodríguez	2	0
WC	(Mexico) T Hank	5	4
7	(Canada) F Peliwo	7	6
4	(Dominican Republic) V Estrella Burgos	7^{7}	4	4
(Colombia) DE Galán	6^{5}	6	6
(Colombia) A González	6	6
(Canada) B Schnur	4	4
(Croatia) A Pavić	6	6
WC	(Mexico) L Patiño	3	3
WC	(Mexico) M Sánchez	4	6^{5}
6	(Barbados) D King	6	7^{7}

Second round
1	(Spain) A Menéndez Maceiras	7^{16}	4	3
(Australia) J-P Smith	6^{14}	6	6
Q	(United Kingdom) J Ward	2	4
7	(Canada) F Peliwo	6	6
(Colombia) DE Galán	2	6	4
(Colombia) A González	6	3	6
(Croatia) A Pavić	6	6
6	(Barbados) D King	4	2

Quarterfinals
(Australia) J-P Smith	6	6
7	(Canada) F Peliwo	1	4
(Colombia) A González	3	6	6
(Croatia) A Pavić	6	4	1

Semifinals
(Australia) J-P Smith	6	6
(Colombia) A González	4	3

=== Bottom half ===
First round
5	(United States) K King	2	2
Q	(Dominican Republic) R Cid Subervi	6	6
(France) U Humbert	6	6
(Serbia) P Krstin	3	5^{r}
LL	(Germany) Tobias Simon	6^{6}	6^{4}
(United States) C Eubanks	7^{8}	7^{7}
(Australia) B Mousley	3	7	4
3	(United States) D Novikov	6	5	6
8	(El Salvador) M Arévalo	5	6	2
Q	(New Zealand) R Statham	7	4	6
(Spain) C Gómez-Herrera	4	5
Q	(Ecuador) R Quiroz	6	7
(Dominican Republic) J Hernández-Fernández	6	4	6
(Serbia) D Petrović	3	6	4
(United States) A Sarkissian	5
2	(Germany) M Moraing	2^{r}

Second round
Q	(Dominican Republic) R Cid Subervi	6	4	6
(France) U Humbert	2	6	3
(United States) C Eubanks	6	6
3	(United States) D Novikov	3	3
Q	(New Zealand) R Statham	6	6^{5}	2
Q	(Ecuador) R Quiroz	3	7^{7}	6
(Dominican Republic) J Hernández-Fernández	6^{2}	6^{4}
(United States) A Sarkissian	7^{7}	7^{7}

Quarterfinals
Q	(Dominican Republic) R Cid Subervi	5	1
(United States) C Eubanks	7	6
Q	(Ecuador) R Quiroz	6	7^{12}
(United States) A Sarkissian	4	6^{10}

Semifinals
(United States) C Eubanks	4	6	6
Q	(Ecuador) R Quiroz	6	4	3
