= 2014 Challenger Ficrea – Doubles =

Men's tennis tournament

Doubles
- 2014 Challenger Ficrea

Final
- Champions: (Australia) Samuel Groth (Australia) Chris Guccione
- Runners-up: (New Zealand) Marcus Daniell (New Zealand) Artem Sitak
- Score: 6–3, 6–4

Events
Singles	Doubles
← 2013 ·	Challenger Ficrea	· 2015 →

Chris Guccione and Matt Reid were the defending champions, but decided not to play together. Chris Guccione will play alongside Samuel Groth.

Samuel Groth and Chris Guccione won the title, defeating Marcus Daniell and Artem Sitak in the final, 6–3, 6–4.

== Seeds ==
1. (India) Purav Raja / (India) Divij Sharan (first round)
2. (Australia) Samuel Groth / (Australia) Chris Guccione (champions)
3. (Brazil) Marcelo Demoliner / (Australia) John-Patrick Smith (quarterfinals)
4. (Germany) Dustin Brown / (Germany) Rajeev Ram (quarterfinals)

== Draw ==
=== Key ===
- Q = Qualifier
- WC = Wild card
- LL = Lucky loser
- Alt = Alternate
- SE = Special exempt
- PR = Protected ranking
- ITF = ITF entry
- JE = Junior exempt
- w/o = Walkover
- r = Retired
- d = Defaulted
- SR = Special ranking

=== Draw ===
First round
1	(India) P Raja (India) D Sharan	6	5	[12]
(United Kingdom) Richard Gabb (United States) N Meister	2	7	[14]
(United States) K King (United States) A Krajicek	6^{7}	6	[10]
WC	(Mexico) L Gómez (Argentina) A Velotti	7^{9}	2	[4]
4	(Germany) D Brown (Germany) R Ram	6	6
PR	(Australia) J Kerr (South Africa) Ivd Merwe	3	2
(New Zealand) M Daniell (New Zealand) A Sitak	6	6
(Japan) H Moriya (Japan) Y Sugita	3	3
WC	(Mexico) A Ruiz-Rosales (Mexico) M Sánchez	5	2
(France) P-H Herbert (Spain) A M-Maceiras	7	6
(Chinese Taipei) H-y Peng (Chinese Taipei) T-h Yang	4	0
3	(Brazil) M Demoliner (Australia) J-P Smith	6	6
(United States) V Mirzadeh (Colombia) E Struvay	3	6^{4}
(United Kingdom) J Delgado (Luxembourg) G Müller	6	7^{7}
WC	(Mexico) D Garza (Mexico) Alejandro Moreno	4	4
2	(Australia) S Groth (Australia) C Guccione	6	6

Quarterfinals
(United Kingdom) R Gabb (United States) N Meister	6^{2}	4
(United States) K King (United States) A Krajicek	7^{7}	6
4	(Germany) D Brown (Germany) R Ram	7^{10}	5	[6]
(New Zealand) M Daniell (New Zealand) A Sitak	6^{8}	7	[10]
(France) P-H Herbert (Spain) A M-Maceiras	6	6
3	(Brazil) M Demoliner (Australia) J-P Smith	3	4
(United Kingdom) J Delgado (Luxembourg) G Müller	6^{5}	4
2	(Australia) S Groth (Australia) C Guccione	7^{7}	6

Semifinals
(United States) K King (United States) A Krajicek	7	2	[10]
(New Zealand) M Daniell (New Zealand) A Sitak	5	6	[12]
(France) P-H Herbert (Spain) A M-Maceiras	4	1
2	(Australia) S Groth (Australia) C Guccione	6	6

Final
(New Zealand) M Daniell (New Zealand) A Sitak	3	4
2	(Australia) S Groth (Australia) C Guccione	6	6
