= 2016 Torneo Internacional Challenger León – Singles =

Singles
- 2016 Torneo Internacional Challenger León

Final
- Champion: (Germany) Michael Berrer
- Runner-up: (Brazil) João Souza
- Score: 6–3, 6–2

Events
Singles	Doubles
← 2015 ·	Torneo Internacional Challenger León	· 2017 →

Austin Krajicek was the defending champion, but lost in the first round to Adrián Menéndez Maceiras.

Michael Berrer won the title, defeating João Souza 6–3, 6–2 in the final.

== Seeds ==
1. (Australia) Sam Groth (first round)
2. (United States) Taylor Fritz (first round)
3. (Tunisia) Malek Jaziri (quarterfinals, retired)
4. (Japan) Yūichi Sugita (first round)
5. (United States) Austin Krajicek (first round)
6. (Germany) Michael Berrer (champion)
7. (France) Stéphane Robert (first round)
8. (Japan) Tatsuma Ito (first round)

== Draw ==
=== Key ===
- Q = Qualifier
- WC = Wild card
- LL = Lucky loser
- Alt = Alternate
- SE = Special exempt
- PR = Protected ranking
- ITF = ITF entry
- JE = Junior exempt
- w/o = Walkover
- r = Retired
- d = Defaulted
- SR = Special ranking

=== Finals ===
Semifinals
6	(Germany) Michael Berrer	6	5	6
Alt	(United States) Daniel Nguyen	3	7	2
Alt	(Brazil) João Souza	7^{7}	6
Q	(Brazil) Caio Zampieri	6^{3}	4

Final
6	(Germany) Michael Berrer	6	6
Alt	(Brazil) João Souza	3	2

=== Top half ===
First round
1	(Australia) S Groth	6^{3}	6	4
(Brazil) A Ghem	7^{7}	2	6
(Colombia) A Falla	6	4	7^{8}
SE	(El Salvador) M Arévalo	3	6	6^{6}
WC	(Mexico) L Gómez	6	6
WC	(Mexico) Alejandro Moreno	1	1
(United States) A Sarkissian	6^{3}	5
6	(Germany) M Berrer	7^{7}	7
4	(Japan) Y Sugita	5	1
SE	(Serbia) P Krstin	7	6
Alt	(Argentina) P Cachin	3	7^{7}	3
Alt	(United States) D Nguyen	6	6^{5}	6
Q	(Czech Republic) Robin Staněk	2	6	7^{7}
Q	(Ecuador) E Gómez	6	4	6^{3}
(Colombia) A González	6	7
8	(Japan) T Ito	4	5

Second round
(Brazil) A Ghem	7	6
(Colombia) A Falla	5	4
WC	(Mexico) L Gómez	1	7	2
6	(Germany) M Berrer	6	5	6
SE	(Serbia) P Krstin	1	2
Alt	(United States) D Nguyen	6	6
Q	(Czech Republic) R Staněk	3	1
(Colombia) A González	6	6

Quarterfinals
(Brazil) A Ghem	3	6	3
6	(Germany) M Berrer	6	2	6
Alt	(United States) D Nguyen	6	6
(Colombia) A González	2	1

Semifinals
6	(Germany) M Berrer	6	5	6
Alt	(United States) D Nguyen	3	7	2

=== Bottom half ===
First round
7	(France) S Robert	6	4	2
(Kazakhstan) D Popko	4	6	6
Alt	(Chinese Taipei) J Jung	1	6^{3}
Alt	(Brazil) J Souza	6	7^{7}
(Serbia) N Milojević	6	4	6^{7}
Alt	(Egypt) M Safwat	3	6	7^{9}
WC	(Mexico) H Hach Verdugo	2	3
3	(Tunisia) M Jaziri	6	6
5	(United States) A Krajicek	4	4
(Spain) A Menéndez Maceiras	6	6
(Switzerland) H Laaksonen	7	6
WC	(Mexico) T Hank	5	3
Q	(Brazil) C Zampieri	6	6
(Republic of Ireland) J McGee	4	4
Q	(Argentina) A Velotti	6^{4}	6	7
2	(United States) T Fritz	7^{7}	3	5

Second round
(Kazakhstan) D Popko	4	4
Alt	(Brazil) J Souza	6	6
Alt	(Egypt) M Safwat	6	4	5
3	(Tunisia) M Jaziri	3	6	7
(Spain) A Menéndez Maceiras	6	6
(Switzerland) H Laaksonen	3	0
Q	(Brazil) C Zampieri	6	6
Q	(Argentina) A Velotti	3	2

Quarterfinals
Alt	(Brazil) J Souza	4	7^{7}	5
3	(Tunisia) M Jaziri	6	6^{1}	0^{r}
(Spain) A Menéndez Maceiras	6	4	4
Q	(Brazil) C Zampieri	2	6	6

Semifinals
Alt	(Brazil) J Souza	7^{7}	6
Q	(Brazil) C Zampieri	6^{3}	4
