= 2017 Torneo Internacional Challenger León – Doubles =

Doubles
- 2017 Torneo Internacional Challenger León

Final
- Champions: (India) Leander Paes (Canada) Adil Shamasdin
- Runners-up: (Switzerland) Luca Margaroli (Brazil) Caio Zampieri
- Score: 6–1, 6–4

Events
Singles	Doubles
← 2016 ·	Torneo Internacional Challenger León	· 2018 →

Santiago González and Mate Pavić were the defending champions but only González chose to defend his title, partnering Artem Sitak. González lost in the first round to Marcelo Arévalo and Fabrício Neis.

Leander Paes and Adil Shamasdin won the title after defeating Luca Margaroli and Caio Zampieri 6–1, 6–4 in the final.

== Seeds ==
1. (India) Purav Raja / (India) Divij Sharan (first round)
2. (Mexico) Santiago González / (New Zealand) Artem Sitak (first round)
3. (India) Leander Paes / (Canada) Adil Shamasdin (champions)
4. (Sweden) Johan Brunström / (Sweden) Andreas Siljeström (first round)

== Draw ==
=== Key ===
- Q = Qualifier
- WC = Wild card
- LL = Lucky loser
- Alt = Alternate
- SE = Special exempt
- PR = Protected ranking
- ITF = ITF entry
- JE = Junior exempt
- w/o = Walkover
- r = Retired
- d = Defaulted
- SR = Special ranking

First round
1	(India) P Raja (India) D Sharan	3	1
(Australia) L Saville (Australia) J-P Smith	6	6
WC	(Mexico) Jorge Ramírez Rangel (Mexico) Andrés Zepeda	1	0
(Uruguay) A Behar (Chile) N Jarry	6	6
3	(India) L Paes (Canada) A Shamasdin	6	3	[10]
(Australia) Jarryd Chaplin (Germany) K Krawietz	4	6	[8]
PR	(United States) S Kozlov (Netherlands) I Sijsling	3	7	[10]
WC	(Mexico) T Hank (Mexico) M Sánchez	6	5	[6]
(Italy) R Ghedin (Germany) A Mies	3	2
(New Zealand) B McLachlan (Brazil) J Souza	6	6
(Switzerland) L Margaroli (Brazil) C Zampieri	6	6
4	(Sweden) J Brunström (Sweden) A Siljeström	4	4
Alt	(Uruguay) M Felder (Russia) T Gabashvili	7^{7}	7^{7}
WC	(Mexico) H Hach Verdugo (Mexico) L Patiño	6^{4}	6^{1}
(El Salvador) M Arévalo (Brazil) F Neis	7	6
2	(Mexico) S González (New Zealand) A Sitak	5	2

Quarterfinals
(Australia) L Saville (Australia) J-P Smith	7^{10}	6^{4}	[10]
(Uruguay) A Behar (Chile) N Jarry	6^{8}	7^{7}	[7]
3	(India) L Paes (Canada) A Shamasdin	6	6
PR	(United States) S Kozlov (Netherlands) I Sijsling	4	2
(New Zealand) B McLachlan (Brazil) J Souza	0	2
(Switzerland) L Margaroli (Brazil) C Zampieri	6	6
Alt	(Uruguay) M Felder (Russia) T Gabashvili	6	7
(El Salvador) M Arévalo (Brazil) F Neis	4	5

Semifinals
(Australia) L Saville (Australia) J-P Smith	7^{7}	4	[5]
3	(India) L Paes (Canada) A Shamasdin	6^{1}	6	[10]
(Switzerland) L Margaroli (Brazil) C Zampieri	3	6	[11]
Alt	(Uruguay) M Felder (Russia) T Gabashvili	6	1	[9]

Final
3	(India) L Paes (Canada) A Shamasdin	6	6
(Switzerland) L Margaroli (Brazil) C Zampieri	1	4
