= 2012 Torneo Internacional AGT – Singles =

Singles
- 2012 Torneo Internacional AGT

Final
- Champion: (United States) Denis Zivkovic
- Runner-up: (United States) Rajeev Ram
- Score: 7–6^{(7–5)}, 6–4

Events
Singles	Doubles
← 2011 ·	Torneo Internacional AGT	· 2013 →

Bobby Reynolds was the defending champion but decided not to participate.
Denis Zivkovic won the title, defeating Rajeev Ram 7–6^{(7–5)}, 6–4 in the final.

== Seeds ==
1. (Australia) Marinko Matosevic (first round)
2. (United States) Rajeev Ram (final)
3. (Italy) Matteo Viola (semifinals)
4. (Czech Republic) Jan Mertl (second round)
5. (Canada) Érik Chvojka (first round)
6. (United Kingdom) Jamie Baker (first round)
7. (Canada) Pierre-Ludovic Duclos (first round)
8. (Moldova) Roman Borvanov (second round)

== Draw ==
=== Key ===
- Q = Qualifier
- WC = Wild card
- LL = Lucky loser
- Alt = Alternate
- SE = Special exempt
- PR = Protected ranking
- ITF = ITF entry
- JE = Junior exempt
- w/o = Walkover
- r = Retired
- d = Defaulted
- SR = Special ranking

=== Finals ===
Semifinals
(Argentina) Agustín Velotti	3	6	3
Q	(United States) Denis Zivkovic	6	3	6
3	(Italy) Matteo Viola	3	5
2	(United States) Rajeev Ram	6	7

Final
Q	(United States) Denis Zivkovic	7^{7}	6
2	(United States) Rajeev Ram	6^{5}	4

=== Top half ===
First round
1/WC	(Australia) M Matosevic	4	6^{4}
WC	(Mexico) M Gallardo-Vallés	6	7^{7}
(France) F Martin	6	6
(Italy) M Marrai	1	4
WC	(Mexico) M Sánchez	4	2
Q	(Australia) C Ebelthite	6	6
(Argentina) A Velotti	6	6
5	(Canada) É Chvojka	2	4
4	(Czech Republic) J Mertl	6	7
(Switzerland) M Lammer	4	5
(Slovakia) A Martin	6	2	7^{7}
(Sweden) M Ryderstedt	3	6	6^{3}
(Germany) A Begemann	6	4	4
Q	(United States) D Zivkovic	3	6	6
Q	(Mexico) Bruno Rodríguez	3	4
8	(Moldova) R Borvanov	6	6

Second round
WC	(Mexico) M Gallardo-Vallés	6^{5}	6	6
(France) F Martin	7^{7}	3	3
Q	(Australia) C Ebelthite	6^{4}	5
(Argentina) A Velotti	7^{7}	7
4	(Czech Republic) J Mertl	2	3
(Slovakia) A Martin	6	6
Q	(United States) D Zivkovic	7	7
8	(Moldova) R Borvanov	5	5

Quarterfinals
WC	(Mexico) M Gallardo-Vallés	3	1
(Argentina) A Velotti	6	6
(Slovakia) A Martin	2	5
Q	(United States) D Zivkovic	6	7

Semifinals
(Argentina) A Velotti	3	6	3
Q	(United States) D Zivkovic	6	3	6

=== Bottom half ===
First round
7	(Canada) P-L Duclos	4	7	1
(Mexico) D Garza	6	5	6
(Chinese Taipei) T Chen	4	6	6
LL	(Guatemala) C Díaz Figueroa	6	3	1
(United Kingdom) A Ward	3	4
(France) P-H Herbert	6	6
(United Kingdom) C Eaton	3	6	1
3	(Italy) M Viola	6	3	6
6	(United Kingdom) J Baker	4	7^{7}	3
Alt	(Australia) J-P Smith	6	6^{0}	6
Q	(Australia) J Peers	6^{2}	6^{9}
(Italy) R Ghedin	7^{7}	7^{9}
(France) A Olivetti	7^{7}	3	7^{7}
WC	(Mexico) C Ramírez	6^{1}	6	6^{5}
(Chile) G Hormazábal	2	2
2	(United States) R Ram	6	6

Second round
(Mexico) D Garza	6	6
(Chinese Taipei) T Chen	4	3
(France) P-H Herbert	5	1
3	(Italy) M Viola	7	6
Alt	(Australia) J-P Smith	7^{7}	6
(Italy) R Ghedin	6^{3}	3
(France) A Olivetti	6^{4}	2
2	(United States) R Ram	7^{7}	6

Quarterfinals
(Mexico) D Garza	6	3	3
3	(Italy) M Viola	3	6	6
Alt	(Australia) J-P Smith	2	4
2	(United States) R Ram	6	6

Semifinals
3	(Italy) M Viola	3	5
2	(United States) R Ram	6	7
