= 2012 Torneo Internacional AGT – Doubles =

Doubles
- 2012 Torneo Internacional AGT

Final
- Champions: (Australia) John Peers (Australia) John-Patrick Smith
- Runners-up: (Mexico) César Ramírez (Mexico) Bruno Rodríguez
- Score: 6–3, 6–3

Events
Singles	Doubles
← 2011 ·	Torneo Internacional AGT	· 2013 →

Rajeev Ram and Bobby Reynolds were the defending champions but Reynolds decided not to participate.
Ram played alongside Travis Parrott, losing in the semifinals.
John Peers and John-Patrick Smith won the title, defeating César Ramírez and Bruno Rodríguez 6–3, 6–3 in the final.

== Seeds ==
1. (United States) Travis Parrott / (United States) Rajeev Ram (semifinals)
2. (Germany) Andre Begemann / (Australia) Jordan Kerr (quarterfinals)
3. (France) Pierre-Hugues Herbert / (France) Albano Olivetti (semifinals)
4. (Australia) Colin Ebelthite / (Germany) Simon Stadler (quarterfinals)

== Draw ==
=== Key ===
- Q = Qualifier
- WC = Wild card
- LL = Lucky loser
- Alt = Alternate
- SE = Special exempt
- PR = Protected ranking
- ITF = ITF entry
- JE = Junior exempt
- w/o = Walkover
- r = Retired
- d = Defaulted
- SR = Special ranking

=== Draw ===
First round
1	(United States) T Parrott (United States) R Ram	6	3	[10]
(Czech Republic) R Jebavý (Czech Republic) J Mertl	3	6	[8]
(Canada) É Chvojka (Australia) Nima Roshan	6	6
(Italy) M Marrai (Italy) M Viola	3	1
4	(Australia) C Ebelthite (Germany) S Stadler	6	4	[10]
(Moldova) R Borvanov (United States) D Zivkovic	3	6	[4]
(United Kingdom) J Baker (United States) N Monroe	4	4
WC	(Mexico) C Ramírez (Mexico) B Rodríguez	6	6
PR	(Mexico) L Díaz-Barriga (Mexico) MA Reyes-Varela	7^{7}	6
WC	(Mexico) Mauricio Astorga (Mexico) M Sánchez	6^{5}	1
WC	(Mexico) D Garza (Australia) M Matosevic	4	2
3	(France) P-H Herbert (France) A Olivetti	6	6
(Australia) J Peers (Australia) J-P Smith	6	6
(Italy) R Ghedin (France) F Martin	4	4
(Canada) P-L Duclos (United Kingdom) C Eaton	6^{1}	3
2	(Germany) A Begemann (Australia) J Kerr	7^{7}	6

Quarterfinals
1	(United States) T Parrott (United States) R Ram	6	3	[10]
(Canada) É Chvojka (Australia) Nima Roshan	1	6	[6]
4	(Australia) C Ebelthite (Germany) S Stadler	4	4
WC	(Mexico) C Ramírez (Mexico) B Rodríguez	6	6
PR	(Mexico) L Díaz-Barriga (Mexico) MA Reyes-Varela	3	5
3	(France) P-H Herbert (France) A Olivetti	6	7
(Australia) J Peers (Australia) J-P Smith	6	6
2	(Germany) A Begemann (Australia) J Kerr	3	4

Semifinals
1	(United States) T Parrott (United States) R Ram	4	7^{7}	[4]
WC	(Mexico) C Ramírez (Mexico) B Rodríguez	6	6^{5}	[10]
3	(France) P-H Herbert (France) A Olivetti	2	4
(Australia) J Peers (Australia) J-P Smith	6	6

Final
WC	(Mexico) C Ramírez (Mexico) B Rodríguez	3	3
(Australia) J Peers (Australia) J-P Smith	6	6
