= 2017 Torneo Internacional Challenger León =

- Date: 28 March – 2 April
- Edition: 15th
- Draw: 32S / 16D
- Prize money: $75,000+H
- Surface: Hard
- Location: León, Mexico

Champions

Singles
- (Spain) Adrián Menéndez Maceiras

Doubles
- (India) Leander Paes / (Canada) Adil Shamasdin
← 2016 ·	Torneo Internacional Challenger León	· 2018 →

The 2017 Torneo Internacional Challenger León was a professional tennis tournament played on hard courts. It was the fifteenth edition of the tournament which was part of the 2017 ATP Challenger Tour. It took place in León, Mexico between 28 March and 2 April 2017.

== Singles main-draw entrants ==
=== Seeds ===
Country	Player	Rank^{1}	Seed
DOM	Víctor Estrella Burgos	91	1
USA	Ernesto Escobedo	108	2
CAN	Vasek Pospisil	119	3
USA	Stefan Kozlov	122	4
BRA	João Souza	123	5
USA	Tennys Sandgren	161	6
RUS	Teymuraz Gabashvili	164	7
TPE	Jason Jung	170	8

- ^{1} Rankings are as of March 20, 2017.

=== Other entrants ===
The following players received wildcards into the singles main draw:

- (Mexico) Santiago González
- (Mexico) Hans Hach Verdugo
- (Mexico) Tigre Hank
- (Mexico) Manuel Sánchez

The following player received entry into the singles main draw as a special exempt:

- (Canada) Denis Shapovalov

The following players received entry into the singles main draw as alternates:

- (Chile) Nicolás Jarry
- (United States) Mackenzie McDonald

The following players received entry from the qualifying draw:

- (Germany) Yannick Hanfmann
- (Spain) Adrián Menéndez Maceiras
- (Serbia) Danilo Petrović
- (Ecuador) Roberto Quiroz

The following player received entry as a lucky loser:

- (United Kingdom) Liam Broady

== Champions ==
=== Singles ===
- (Spain) Adrián Menéndez Maceiras def. (Ecuador) Roberto Quiroz 6–4, 3–6, 6–3.

=== Doubles ===
- (India) Leander Paes / (Canada) Adil Shamasdin def. (Switzerland) Luca Margaroli / (Brazil) Caio Zampieri 6–1, 6–4.
