= 2016 Torneo Internacional Challenger León – Doubles =

Doubles
- 2016 Torneo Internacional Challenger León

Final
- Champions: (Mexico) Santiago González (Croatia) Mate Pavić
- Runners-up: (Australia) Sam Groth (India) Leander Paes
- Score: 6–4, 3–6, [13–11]

Events
Singles	Doubles
← 2015 ·	Torneo Internacional Challenger León	· 2017 →

Austin Krajicek and Rajeev Ram were the defending champions, but only Krajicek chose to defend his title partnering Alejandro Falla. Krajicek and Falla withdrew before playing a match.

Santiago González and Mate Pavić won the title, defeating Sam Groth and Leander Paes 6–4, 3–6, [13–11] in the final.

== Seeds ==
1. (Mexico) Santiago González / (Croatia) Mate Pavić (champions)
2. (New Zealand) Marcus Daniell / (New Zealand) Artem Sitak (semifinals)
3. (Australia) Sam Groth / (India) Leander Paes (final)
4. (South Africa) Dean O'Brien / (Mexico) Miguel Ángel Reyes-Varela (semifinals)

== Draw ==
=== Key ===
- Q = Qualifier
- WC = Wild card
- LL = Lucky loser
- Alt = Alternate
- SE = Special exempt
- PR = Protected ranking
- ITF = ITF entry
- JE = Junior exempt
- w/o = Walkover
- r = Retired
- d = Defaulted
- SR = Special ranking

First round
1	(Mexico) S González (Croatia) M Pavić	6	6
(Venezuela) R Maytín (Spain) A Menéndez-Maceiras	4	2
(Uruguay) A Behar (Italy) A Motti	4	4
(India) P Raja (South Africa) R Roelofse	6	6
4	(South Africa) D O'Brien (Mexico) MÁ Reyes-Varela	w/o
(Colombia) A Falla (United States) A Krajicek
(Colombia) A González (Venezuela) LD Martínez	6	6^{8}	[12]
WC	(Mexico) D Garza (Mexico) T Hank	4	7^{10}	[10]
(Colombia) N Barrientos (Argentina) A Molteni	6	1	[1]
(Brazil) A Ghem (Brazil) F Neis	3	6	[10]
(Brazil) J Souza (Japan) Y Sugita	2	6	[10]
3	(Australia) S Groth (India) L Paes	6	4	[12]
(El Salvador) M Arévalo (Peru) S Galdós	6	6
WC	(Mexico) Mauricio Astorga (Mexico) M Sánchez	4	4
WC	(Mexico) H Hach Verdugo (Mexico) L Patiño	4	7^{9}	[4]
2	(New Zealand) M Daniell (New Zealand) A Sitak	6	6^{7}	[10]

Quarterfinals
1	(Mexico) S González (Croatia) M Pavić	6	6
(India) P Raja (South Africa) R Roelofse	2	2
4	(South Africa) D O'Brien (Mexico) MÁ Reyes-Varela	6	6
(Colombia) A González (Venezuela) LD Martínez	2	2
(Brazil) A Ghem (Brazil) F Neis	6^{5}	4
3	(Australia) S Groth (India) L Paes	7^{7}	6
(El Salvador) M Arévalo (Peru) S Galdós	2	3
2	(New Zealand) M Daniell (New Zealand) A Sitak	6	6

Semifinals
1	(Mexico) S González (Croatia) M Pavić	7^{7}	6
4	(South Africa) D O'Brien (Mexico) MÁ Reyes-Varela	6^{5}	3
3	(Australia) S Groth (India) L Paes	7^{7}	7^{10}
2	(New Zealand) M Daniell (New Zealand) A Sitak	6^{2}	6^{8}

Final
1	(Mexico) S González (Croatia) M Pavić	6	3	[13]
3	(Australia) S Groth (India) L Paes	4	6	[11]
