= 2015 Torneo Internacional Challenger León – Doubles =

Doubles
- 2015 Torneo Internacional Challenger León

Final
- Champions: (United States) Austin Krajicek (United States) Rajeev Ram
- Runners-up: (Argentina) Guillermo Durán (Argentina) Horacio Zeballos
- Score: 6–2, 7–5

Events
Singles	Doubles
← 2014 ·	Torneo Internacional Challenger León	· 2016 →

Sam Groth and Chris Guccione were the defending champions, but chose to compete in the 2015 U.S. Men's Clay Court Championships instead.

Austin Krajicek and Rajeev Ram won the title, defeating Guillermo Durán and Horacio Zeballos in the final, 6–2, 7–5.

== Seeds ==
1. (United States) Austin Krajicek / (United States) Rajeev Ram (champions)
2. (Argentina) Guillermo Durán / (Argentina) Horacio Zeballos (final)
3. (Venezuela) Roberto Maytín / (Argentina) Andrés Molteni (semifinals)
4. (Colombia) Nicolás Barrientos / (Colombia) Eduardo Struvay (quarterfinals)

== Draw ==
=== Key ===
- Q = Qualifier
- WC = Wild card
- LL = Lucky loser
- Alt = Alternate
- SE = Special exempt
- PR = Protected ranking
- ITF = ITF entry
- JE = Junior exempt
- w/o = Walkover
- r = Retired
- d = Defaulted
- SR = Special ranking

=== Draw ===
First round
1	(United States) A Krajicek (United States) R Ram	7^{7}	6
(Germany) N Langer (Austria) G Melzer	6^{4}	4
WC	(Australia) Chris Letcher (Mexico) Jorge Ramírez Rangel	6^{2}	3
(United States) K King (South Africa) D O'Brien	7^{7}	6
4	(Colombia) N Barrientos (Colombia) E Struvay	6	7
WC	(Mexico) T Hank (Mexico) M Sánchez	4	5
(Brazil) M Demoliner (Mexico) MÁ Reyes-Varela	4	6	[10]
(United States) J Cerretani (Netherlands) A van der Duim	6	1	[7]
(Argentina) JI Londero (Mexico) C Ramírez	6	7^{7}
WC	(Mexico) D Garza (Mexico) L Patiño	4	6^{2}
(Spain) A Menéndez-Maceiras (India) D Sharan	6^{2}	6^{2}
3	(Venezuela) R Maytín (Argentina) A Molteni	7^{7}	7^{7}
(Uruguay) A Behar (Argentina) R Olivo	6	7^{7}
(United Kingdom) B Klein (Australia) D Propoggia	4	6^{4}
(Peru) S Galdós (Argentina) G Pella	3	4
2	(Argentina) G Durán (Argentina) H Zeballos	6	6

Quarterfinals
1	(United States) A Krajicek (United States) R Ram	7	7^{7}
(United States) K King (South Africa) D O'Brien	5	6^{4}
4	(Colombia) N Barrientos (Colombia) E Struvay	7^{7}	2	[4]
(Brazil) M Demoliner (Mexico) MÁ Reyes-Varela	6^{5}	6	[10]
(Argentina) JI Londero (Mexico) C Ramírez	6^{3}	6^{6}
3	(Venezuela) R Maytín (Argentina) A Molteni	7^{7}	7^{8}
(Uruguay) A Behar (Argentina) R Olivo	1	5
2	(Argentina) G Durán (Argentina) H Zeballos	6	7

Semifinals
1	(United States) A Krajicek (United States) R Ram	6	3	[11]
(Brazil) M Demoliner (Mexico) MÁ Reyes-Varela	3	6	[9]
3	(Venezuela) R Maytín (Argentina) A Molteni	6	2	[3]
2	(Argentina) G Durán (Argentina) H Zeballos	4	6	[10]

Final
1	(United States) A Krajicek (United States) R Ram	6	7
2	(Argentina) G Durán (Argentina) H Zeballos	2	5
