= 2019 Torneo Internacional Challenger León – Doubles =

Doubles
- 2019 Torneo Internacional Challenger León

Final
- Champions: (Austria) Lucas Miedler (Austria) Sebastian Ofner
- Runners-up: (Australia) Matt Reid (Australia) John-Patrick Smith
- Score: 4–6, 6–4, [10–6]

Events
| Singles | Doubles |
- Torneo Internacional Challenger León

Gonzalo Escobar and Manuel Sánchez were the defending champions but only Escobar chose to defend his title, partnering Luis David Martínez. Escobar lost in the first round to Adrián Menéndez Maceiras and Federico Zeballos.

Lucas Miedler and Sebastian Ofner won the title after defeating Matt Reid and John-Patrick Smith 4–6, 6–4, [10–6] in the final.

== Seeds ==
1. (El Salvador) Marcelo Arévalo / (Mexico) Miguel Ángel Reyes-Varela (quarterfinals)
2. (Australia) Matt Reid / (Australia) John-Patrick Smith (final)
3. (United States) Evan King / (United States) Nathan Pasha (quarterfinals)
4. (Mexico) Hans Hach Verdugo / (Croatia) Ante Pavić (semifinals)

== Draw ==
Key

- Q = Qualifier
- WC = Wild card
- LL = Lucky loser
- Alt = Alternate
- ITF = ITF entry
- PR = Protected ranking
- SR = Special ranking
- SE = Special exempt
- JE = Junior exempt
- JR = Junior Accelerator Programme entrant
- CO = College Accelerator Programme entrant
- NG = Next Gen Accelerator Program entrant
- w/o = Walkover
- r = Retired
- d = Defaulted

First round
1 | (El Salvador) M Arévalo (Mexico) MÁ Reyes-Varela | 6 | 6
(Uruguay) A Behar (Ecuador) R Quiroz | 3 | 4
Alt | (Austria) L Miedler (Austria) S Ofner | 6 | 6
WC | (Mexico) Íker Muñoz (Mexico) José Andrés Pérez Pérez | 0 | 0
3 | (United States) E King (United States) N Pasha | 7^{7} | 6
(United States) C Eubanks (Barbados) D King | 6^{4} | 4
(Germany) D Brown (Netherlands) S Verbeek | 6 | 6
(United Kingdom) S Clayton (Canada) A Shamasdin | 3 | 4
(Ecuador) G Escobar (Venezuela) LD Martínez | 3 | 7 | [5]
(Spain) A Menéndez Maceiras (Bolivia) F Zeballos | 6 | 5 | [10]
Alt | (Peru) S Galdós (Egypt) M Safwat | 6^{5} | 7^{12} | [7]
4 | (Mexico) H Hach Verdugo (Croatia) A Pavić | 7^{7} | 6^{10} | [10]
WC | (Mexico) Rafael de Alba (Mexico) Alan Raúl Sau Franco | 6 | 3 | [10]
WC | (Mexico) A Hernández (Mexico) A Magadán | 3 | 6 | [8]
ITF | (Argentina) MF Descotte (Tunisia) S Mansouri | 4 | 7^{7} | [4]
2 | (Australia) M Reid (Australia) J-P Smith | 6 | 6^{4} | [10]

Quarterfinals
1 | (El Salvador) M Arévalo (Mexico) MÁ Reyes-Varela | 4 | 4
Alt | (Austria) L Miedler (Austria) S Ofner | 6 | 6
3 | (United States) E King (United States) N Pasha | 4 | 4
(Germany) D Brown (Netherlands) S Verbeek | 6 | 6
(Spain) A Menéndez Maceiras (Bolivia) F Zeballos | 6^{5} | 6^{3}
4 | (Mexico) H Hach Verdugo (Croatia) A Pavić | 7^{7} | 7^{7}
WC | (Mexico) R de Alba (Mexico) AR Sau Franco | 2 | 2
2 | (Australia) M Reid (Australia) J-P Smith | 6 | 6

Semifinals
Alt | (Austria) L Miedler (Austria) S Ofner | 6 | 6
(Germany) D Brown (Netherlands) S Verbeek | 1 | 4
4 | (Mexico) H Hach Verdugo (Croatia) A Pavić | 4 | 3
2 | (Australia) M Reid (Australia) J-P Smith | 6 | 6

Final
Alt | (Austria) L Miedler (Austria) S Ofner | 4 | 6 | [10]
2 | (Australia) M Reid (Australia) J-P Smith | 6 | 4 | [6]
