= 2023 León Open – Doubles =

Doubles
- 2023 León Open

Final
- Champions: (Tunisia) Aziz Dougaz (France) Antoine Escoffier
- Runners-up: (Austria) Maximilian Neuchrist (Greece) Michail Pervolarakis
- Score: 7–6^{(7–5)}, 3–6, [10–5]

Events
Singles	Doubles
León Open	· 2024 →

Lucas Miedler and Sebastian Ofner were the defending champions but chose not to defend their title.

Aziz Dougaz and Antoine Escoffier won the title after defeating Maximilian Neuchrist and Michail Pervolarakis 7–6^{(7–5)}, 3–6, [10–5] in the final.

== Seeds ==
1. (Mexico) Hans Hach Verdugo / (Australia) Luke Saville (semifinals)
2. (Philippines) Ruben Gonzales / (United States) Alex Lawson (quarterfinals)
3. (Bolivia) Boris Arias / (Bolivia) Federico Zeballos (quarterfinals)
4. (France) Théo Arribagé / (France) Luca Sanchez (first round)

== Draw ==
=== Key ===
- Q = Qualifier
- WC = Wild card
- LL = Lucky loser
- Alt = Alternate
- SE = Special exempt
- PR = Protected ranking
- ITF = ITF entry
- JE = Junior exempt
- w/o = Walkover
- r = Retired
- d = Defaulted
- SR = Special ranking

First round
1	(Mexico) H Hach Verdugo (Australia) L Saville	6	6
WC	(Mexico) Daniel Moreno (Mexico) M Sánchez	3	2
WC	(Mexico) R Pacheco Méndez (Paraguay) AD Vallejo	4	6	[5]
(Argentina) JP Ficovich (Argentina) F Mena	6	4	[10]
4	(France) T Arribagé (France) L Sanchez	4	5
(Tunisia) A Dougaz (France) A Escoffier	6	7
(Switzerland) A Bellier (United Kingdom) J Paris	7^{7}	6
Alt	(Colombia) N Mejía (Colombia) A Urrea	6^{5}	4
PR	(Tunisia) S Mansouri (New Zealand) R Statham	3	6	[11]
(Canada) A Galarneau (New Zealand) A Rai	6	2	[9]
(United Kingdom) A McHugh (China) Y Bu	6^{2}	3
3	(Bolivia) B Arias (Bolivia) F Zeballos	7^{7}	6
(Zimbabwe) B Lock (Northern Mariana Islands) C Sinclair	6^{6}	3
(Austria) M Neuchrist (Greece) M Pervolarakis	7^{8}	6
(Argentina) R Olivo (Argentina) TA Tirante	7^{8}	4	[6]
2	(Philippines) R Gonzales (United States) A Lawson	6^{6}	6	[10]

Quarterfinals
1	(Mexico) H Hach Verdugo (Australia) L Saville	6	6
(Argentina) JP Ficovich (Argentina) F Mena	4	4
(Tunisia) A Dougaz (France) A Escoffier	6	6
(Switzerland) A Bellier (United Kingdom) J Paris	3	1
PR	(Tunisia) S Mansouri (New Zealand) R Statham	6	7^{7}
3	(Bolivia) B Arias (Bolivia) F Zeballos	4	6^{4}
(Austria) M Neuchrist (Greece) M Pervolarakis	6^{3}	6	[10]
2	(Philippines) R Gonzales (United States) A Lawson	7^{7}	3	[6]

Semifinals
1	(Mexico) H Hach Verdugo (Australia) L Saville	4	4
(Tunisia) A Dougaz (France) A Escoffier	6	6
PR	(Tunisia) S Mansouri (New Zealand) R Statham	7	6^{7}	[6]
(Austria) M Neuchrist (Greece) M Pervolarakis	5	7^{9}	[10]

Final
(Tunisia) A Dougaz (France) A Escoffier	7^{7}	3	[10]
(Austria) M Neuchrist (Greece) M Pervolarakis	6^{5}	6	[5]
