= 2018 Torneo Internacional Challenger León – Doubles =

Doubles
- 2018 Torneo Internacional Challenger León

Final
- Champions: (Ecuador) Gonzalo Escobar (Mexico) Manuel Sánchez
- Runners-up: (Australia) Bradley Mousley (Australia) John-Patrick Smith
- Score: 6–4, 6–4

Events
Singles	Doubles
- Torneo Internacional Challenger León

Leander Paes and Adil Shamasdin were the defending champions but chose not to defend their title.

Gonzalo Escobar and Manuel Sánchez won the title after defeating Bradley Mousley and John-Patrick Smith 6–4, 6–4 in the final.

== Seeds ==
1. (El Salvador) Marcelo Arévalo / (Mexico) Miguel Ángel Reyes-Varela (quarterfinals)
2. (Australia) Bradley Mousley / (Australia) John-Patrick Smith (final)
3. (United Kingdom) Brydan Klein / (South Africa) Ruan Roelofse (first round)
4. (Spain) Adrián Menéndez Maceiras / (Ecuador) Roberto Quiroz (semifinals)

== Draw ==
Key

- Q = Qualifier
- WC = Wild card
- LL = Lucky loser
- Alt = Alternate
- ITF = ITF entry
- PR = Protected ranking
- SR = Special ranking
- SE = Special exempt
- JE = Junior exempt
- JR = Junior Accelerator Programme entrant
- CO = College Accelerator Programme entrant
- NG = Next Gen Accelerator Program entrant
- w/o = Walkover
- r = Retired
- d = Defaulted

First round
1	(El Salvador) M Arévalo (Mexico) MÁ Reyes-Varela	6	6^{4}	[12]
WC	(Colombia) A Gómez (Mexico) L Patiño	4	7^{7}	[10]
WC	(Ecuador) G Escobar (Mexico) M Sánchez	6	6
(Zimbabwe) B Lock (Brazil) F Romboli	2	4
4	(Spain) A Menéndez Maceiras (Ecuador) R Quiroz	6	6
PR	(Colombia) N Barrientos (Serbia) D Petrović	4	2
WC	(Mexico) L Gómez (Mexico) T Hank	4	5
PR	(Venezuela) LD Martínez (Mexico) C Ramírez	6	7
Alt	(Bolivia) B Arias (Canada) F Peliwo	2	6^{4}
(Argentina) F Agamenone (Bolivia) F Zeballos	6	7^{7}
(Venezuela) R Maytín (United States) D Novikov	6	3	[10]
3	(United Kingdom) B Klein (South Africa) R Roelofse	3	6	[3]
(Mexico) H Hach Verdugo (Canada) B Schnur	6	6
(Dominican Republic) V Estrella Burgos (Peru) S Galdós	2	3
(Barbados) D King (New Zealand) R Statham	3	3
2	(Australia) B Mousley (Australia) J-P Smith	6	6

Quarterfinals
1	(El Salvador) M Arévalo (Mexico) MÁ Reyes-Varela	6	6^{6}	[7]
WC	(Ecuador) G Escobar (Mexico) M Sánchez	2	7^{8}	[10]
4	(Spain) A Menéndez Maceiras (Ecuador) R Quiroz	6	7^{7}
PR	(Venezuela) LD Martínez (Mexico) C Ramírez	4	6^{1}
(Argentina) F Agamenone (Bolivia) F Zeballos	2	6^{5}
(Venezuela) R Maytín (United States) D Novikov	6	7^{7}
(Mexico) H Hach Verdugo (Canada) B Schnur	5	4
2	(Australia) B Mousley (Australia) J-P Smith	7	6

Semifinals
WC	(Ecuador) G Escobar (Mexico) M Sánchez	6	7^{7}
4	(Spain) A Menéndez Maceiras (Ecuador) R Quiroz	1	6^{0}
(Venezuela) R Maytín (United States) D Novikov	6^{3}	6	[10]
2	(Australia) B Mousley (Australia) J-P Smith	7^{7}	4	[12]

Final
WC	(Ecuador) G Escobar (Mexico) M Sánchez	6	6
2	(Australia) B Mousley (Australia) J-P Smith	4	4
