= 2014 Challenger Ficrea – Singles =

Tennis tournament

Singles
- 2014 Challenger Ficrea

Final
- Champion: (United States) Rajeev Ram
- Runner-up: (Australia) Samuel Groth
- Score: 6–2, 6–2

Events
Singles	Doubles
← 2013 ·	Challenger Ficrea	· 2015 →

The 2014 Challenger Ficrea was a professional tennis tournament play on hardcourts. In its 2014 Challenger Ficrea Singles, Donald Young was the defending champion, but decided not to compete.

Rajeev Ram won the title, defeating Samuel Groth in the final, 6–2, 6–2.

== Seeds ==
1. (Australia) Matthew Ebden (second round, retired due to Gastroenteritis)
2. (Russia) Alex Bogomolov Jr. (second round)
3. (Germany) Dustin Brown (second round)
4. (France) Pierre-Hugues Herbert (quarterfinals)
5. (United States) Rajeev Ram (champion)
6. (Japan) Yūichi Sugita (quarterfinals, retired)
7. (Australia) Samuel Groth (final)
8. (Japan) Hiroki Moriya (first round, retired due to Gastroenteritis)

== Draw ==
=== Key ===
- Q = Qualifier
- WC = Wild card
- LL = Lucky loser
- Alt = Alternate
- SE = Special exempt
- PR = Protected ranking
- ITF = ITF entry
- JE = Junior exempt
- w/o = Walkover
- r = Retired
- d = Defaulted
- SR = Special ranking

=== Finals ===
Semifinals
(Spain) Adrián Menéndez Maceiras	4	6^{5}
5	(United States) Rajeev Ram	6	7^{7}
7	(Australia) Samuel Groth	5	6	6
(Argentina) Agustín Velotti	7	2	3

Final
5	(United States) Rajeev Ram	6	6
7	(Australia) Samuel Groth	2	2

=== Top half ===
First round
1	(Australia) M Ebden	6	6
WC	(Mexico) Mauricio Astorga	3	2
(Spain) A M Maceiras	6	6
(Ecuador) I Endara	0	4
(Republic of Ireland) L Sorensen	6	6
(South Africa) Ivd Merwe	1	3
(Italy) Erik Crepaldi	2	6	4
6	(Japan) Y Sugita	6	3	6
4	(France) P-H Herbert	6	6
Q	(Mexico) D Garza	1	0
(Zimbabwe) T Garanganga	3	4
(Croatia) A Pavić	6	6
(Australia) J-P Smith	3	4
Q	(United States) K King	6	6
(Chinese Taipei) T-h Yang	4	4
5	(United States) R Ram	6	6

Second round
1	(Australia) M Ebden	6^{7}	6^{r}
(Spain) A M Maceiras	7^{9}	2
(Republic of Ireland) L Sorensen	4	2
6	(Japan) Y Sugita	6	6
4	(France) P-H Herbert	7^{8}	3	6
(Croatia) A Pavić	6^{6}	6	3
Q	(United States) K King	2	6	5
5	(United States) R Ram	6	4	7

Quarterfinals
(Spain) A M Maceiras	6	6^{5}	2
6	(Japan) Y Sugita	3	7^{7}	0^{r}
4	(France) P-H Herbert	4	2
5	(United States) R Ram	6	6

Semifinals
(Spain) A M Maceiras	4	6^{5}
5	(United States) R Ram	6	7^{7}

=== Bottom half ===
First round
7	(Australia) S Groth	6	7^{7}
WC	(Mexico) L Patiño	3	6^{3}
WC	(Mexico) L Gómez	7^{7}	2	0
(Japan) Y Nishioka	6^{2}	6	6
(United States) A Krajicek	6	6
LL	(United Kingdom) Richard Gabb	3	1
(Luxembourg) G Müller	6^{4}	6^{5}
3	(Germany) D Brown	7^{7}	7^{7}
8	(Japan) H Moriya	2	0^{r}
(Argentina) A Velotti	6	3
(Argentina) JI Londero	1	3
(United States) N Meister	6	6
Q	(New Zealand) M Daniell	7^{8}	6
(United States) D Kosakowski	6^{6}	4
Q	(India) P Raja	5	3
2/WC	(Russia) A Bogomolov Jr.	7	6

Second round
7	(Australia) S Groth	6	4	6
(Japan) Y Nishioka	3	6	4
(United States) A Krajicek	6	6
3	(Germany) D Brown	3	4
(Argentina) A Velotti	7^{7}	6
(United States) N Meister	6^{3}	4
Q	(New Zealand) M Daniell	6	7^{11}
2/WC	(Russia) A Bogomolov Jr.	3	6^{9}

Quarterfinals
7	(Australia) S Groth	7^{7}	3	7^{7}
(United States) A Krajicek	6^{5}	6	6^{2}
(Argentina) A Velotti	6	0
Q	(New Zealand) M Daniell	1	0^{r}

Semifinals
7	(Australia) S Groth	5	6	6
(Argentina) A Velotti	7	2	3
