= 2019 Torneo Internacional Challenger León =

- Date: 22–28 April
- Edition: 17th
- Draw: 48S / 16D
- Surface: Hard
- Location: León, Mexico

Champions

Singles
- (Slovenia) Blaž Rola

Doubles
- (Austria) Lucas Miedler / (Austria) Sebastian Ofner
← 2018 ·	Torneo Internacional Challenger León	· 2023 →

The 2019 Torneo Internacional Challenger León was a professional tennis tournament played on hard courts. It was the seventeenth edition of the tournament which was part of the 2019 ATP Challenger Tour. It took place in León, Mexico between 22 and 28 April 2019.

== Singles main-draw entrants ==
=== Seeds ===
Country	Player	Rank^{1}	Seed
KAZ	Alexander Bublik	100	1
ESP	Adrián Menéndez Maceiras	137	2
USA	Christopher Eubanks	147	3
GER	Dustin Brown	171	4
AUT	Sebastian Ofner	172	5
BIH	Mirza Bašić	185	6
GBR	James Ward	187	7
EGY	Mohamed Safwat	191	8
SRB	Peđa Krstin	192	9
USA	Donald Young	194	10
BAR	Darian King	203	11
ECU	Roberto Quiroz	210	12
AUS	John-Patrick Smith	220	13
SLO	Blaž Rola	255	14
AUT	Lucas Miedler	257	15
ESA	Marcelo Arévalo	270	16

- ^{1} Rankings are as of April 15, 2019.

=== Other entrants ===
The following players received wildcards into the singles main draw:

- (United States) Milledge Cossu
- (Mexico) Lucas Gómez
- (Mexico) Gerardo López Villaseñor
- (Mexico) Luis Patiño

The following player received entry into the singles main draw using a protected ranking:

- (Spain) Carlos Gómez-Herrera

The following players received entry into the singles main draw using their ITF World Tennis Ranking:

- (Spain) Andrés Artuñedo
- (France) Baptiste Crepatte
- (France) Manuel Guinard
- (Tunisia) Skander Mansouri
- (Brazil) João Menezes

The following players received entry from the qualifying draw:

- (Colombia) Felipe Mantilla
- (United States) Martin Redlicki

The following player received entry as a lucky loser:

- (Argentina) Camilo Ugo Carabelli

== Champions ==
=== Singles ===
- (Slovenia) Blaž Rola def. (United Kingdom) Liam Broady 6–4, 4–6, 6–3.

=== Doubles ===
- (Austria) Lucas Miedler / (Austria) Sebastian Ofner def. (Australia) Matt Reid / (Australia) John-Patrick Smith 4–6, 6–4, [10–6].
