= 2024 GNP Seguros Tennis Open – Singles =

Singles
- 2024 GNP Seguros Tennis Open

Final
- Champion: (France) Giovanni Mpetshi Perricard
- Runner-up: (Australia) Adam Walton
- Score: 6–3, 6–3

Events
Singles	Doubles
← 2023 ·	GNP Seguros Tennis Open	· 2025 →

Giovanni Mpetshi Perricard was the defending champion and successfully defended his title after defeating Adam Walton 6–3, 6–3 in the final.

== Seeds ==
1. (Australia) Rinky Hijikata (quarterfinals)
2. (United States) Michael Mmoh (first round)
3. (United States) Zachary Svajda (semifinals)
4. (Australia) Adam Walton (final)
5. (France) Giovanni Mpetshi Perricard (champion)
6. (Canada) Alexis Galarneau (semifinals)
7. (Kazakhstan) Beibit Zhukayev (second round)
8. (United States) Maxime Cressy (quarterfinals, withdrew)

== Draw ==
Key

- Q = Qualifier
- WC = Wild card
- LL = Lucky loser
- Alt = Alternate
- ITF = ITF entry
- PR = Protected ranking
- SR = Special ranking
- SE = Special exempt
- JE = Junior exempt
- JR = Junior Accelerator Programme entrant
- CO = College Accelerator Programme entrant
- NG = Next Gen Accelerator Program entrant
- w/o = Walkover
- r = Retired
- d = Defaulted

=== Finals ===
Semifinals
6	(Canada) Alexis Galarneau	4	6^{3}
4	(Australia) Adam Walton	6	7^{7}
3	(United States) Zachary Svajda	2	0
5	(France) Giovanni Mpetshi Perricard	6	6

Final
4	(Australia) Adam Walton	3	3
5	(France) Giovanni Mpetshi Perricard	6	6

=== Top half ===
First round
1	(Australia) R Hijikata	4	6	6
(Jamaica) B Bicknell	6	2	3
(Brazil) JL Reis da Silva	4	2
Q	(Slovenia) B Artnak	6	6
WC	(Mexico) E Escobedo	4	0
WC	(Paraguay) AD Vallejo	6	6
(Germany) S Fanselow	3	2
6	(Canada) A Galarneau	6	6
4	(Australia) A Walton	6	6
(United Kingdom) C Broom	2	3
Alt	(United Kingdom) A McHugh	6	6
Q	(United States) R Seggerman	3	2
(Australia) T Schoolkate	5	7^{7}	6
(United States) A Mayo	7	6^{3}	1
(Switzerland) A Bellier	5	4
7	(Kazakhstan) B Zhukayev	7	6

Second round
1	(Australia) R Hijikata	7^{7}	6
Q	(Slovenia) B Artnak	6^{5}	3
WC	(Paraguay) AD Vallejo	6^{7}	1
6	(Canada) A Galarneau	7^{9}	6
4	(Australia) A Walton	6	6
Alt	(United Kingdom) A McHugh	1	0
(Australia) T Schoolkate	5	6	6
7	(Kazakhstan) B Zhukayev	7	3	4

Quarterfinals
1	(Australia) R Hijikata	0	5
6	(Canada) A Galarneau	6	7
4	(Australia) A Walton	6	6
(Australia) T Schoolkate	2	4

Semifinals
6	(Canada) A Galarneau	4	6^{3}
4	(Australia) A Walton	6	7^{7}

=== Bottom half ===
First round
8	(United States) M Cressy	6	6
Q	(United States) Nathan Ponwith	4	0
(Australia) B Tomic	5	3
(Argentina) JP Ficovich	7	6
(Venezuela) G Oliveira	6	6
Q	(Brazil) K Sell	3	3
Q	(United States) Andre Ilagan	3	2
3	(United States) Z Svajda	6	6
5	(France) G Mpetshi Perricard	3	6	6
(Australia) O Jasika	6	3	3
(Netherlands) G Brouwer	6	6
Q	(Czech Republic) D Palán	1	4
(France) M Janvier	6	5	5
SE	(Colombia) N Mejía	2	7	7
WC	(Mexico) R Pacheco Méndez	6	7^{8}
2	(United States) M Mmoh	3	6^{6}

Second round
8	(United States) M Cressy	6	6
(Argentina) JP Ficovich	3	3
(Venezuela) G Oliveira	4	5
3	(United States) Z Svajda	6	7
5	(France) G Mpetshi Perricard	7	7
(Netherlands) G Brouwer	5	5
SE	(Colombia) N Mejía	3	3
WC	(Mexico) R Pacheco Méndez	6	6

Quarterfinals
8	(United States) M Cressy
3	(United States) Z Svajda	w/o
5	(France) G Mpetshi Perricard	6	6
WC	(Mexico) R Pacheco Méndez	1	4

Semifinals
3	(United States) Z Svajda	2	0
5	(France) G Mpetshi Perricard	6	6
