= 2024 GNP Seguros Tennis Open – Doubles =

Doubles
- 2024 GNP Seguros Tennis Open

Final
- Champions: (India) Rithvik Choudary Bollipalli (India) Niki Kaliyanda Poonacha
- Runners-up: (United Kingdom) Luke Johnson (Tunisia) Skander Mansouri
- Score: 7–6^{(7–4)}, 7–5

Events
Singles	Doubles
← 2023 ·	GNP Seguros Tennis Open	· 2025 →

Aziz Dougaz and Antoine Escoffier were the defending champions but chose not to defend their title.

Rithvik Choudary Bollipalli and Niki Kaliyanda Poonacha won the title after defeating Luke Johnson and Skander Mansouri 7–6^{(7–4)}, 7–5 in the final.

== Seeds ==
1. (United Kingdom) Luke Johnson / (Tunisia) Skander Mansouri (final)
2. (Poland) Piotr Matuszewski / (Australia) Matthew Romios (quarterfinals)
3. (Australia) Rinky Hijikata / (United States) Mac Kiger (quarterfinals)
4. (India) Arjun Kadhe / (India) Jeevan Nedunchezhiyan (first round)

== Draw ==
=== Key ===
- Q = Qualifier
- WC = Wild card
- LL = Lucky loser
- Alt = Alternate
- SE = Special exempt
- PR = Protected ranking
- ITF = ITF entry
- JE = Junior exempt
- w/o = Walkover
- r = Retired
- d = Defaulted
- SR = Special ranking

=== Draw ===
First round
1	(United Kingdom) L Johnson (Tunisia) S Mansouri	6	7^{7}
(United States) M Cressy (France) M Janvier	2	6^{5}
(United States) R Seggerman (United States) P Trhac	6	4	[10]
(United Kingdom) J Paris (Chile) M Soto	2	6	[8]
4	(India) A Kadhe (India) J Nedunchezhiyan	3	6	[7]
(Switzerland) A Bellier (France) L Sanchez	6	3	[10]
Alt	(Netherlands) G Brouwer (United Kingdom) A McHugh	6	6
PR	(Zimbabwe) B Lock (Zimbabwe) CJ Lock	3	4
(India) A Chandrasekar (Mexico) H Hach Verdugo	4	6	[11]
(United Kingdom) C Broom (Australia) A Walton	6	4	[9]
(Australia) C Puttergill (New Zealand) R Statham	1	4
3	(Australia) R Hijikata (United States) M Kiger	6	6
(India) RC Bollipalli (India) N Kaliyanda Poonacha	7	6
(Argentina) JP Ficovich (Brazil) JL Reis da Silva	5	2
Alt	(New Zealand) K Pannu (United States) K Smith	2	6	[10]
2	(Poland) P Matuszewski (Australia) MC Romios	6	4	[12]

Quarterfinals
1	(United Kingdom) L Johnson (Tunisia) S Mansouri	7^{9}	3	[10]
(United States) R Seggerman (United States) P Trhac	6^{7}	6	[8]
(Switzerland) A Bellier (France) L Sanchez	4	5
Alt	(Netherlands) G Brouwer (United Kingdom) A McHugh	6	7
(India) A Chandrasekar (Mexico) H Hach Verdugo	3	6	[10]
3	(Australia) R Hijikata (United States) M Kiger	6	4	[7]
(India) RC Bollipalli (India) N Kaliyanda Poonacha	6	6
2	(Poland) P Matuszewski (Australia) MC Romios	4	1

Semifinals
1	(United Kingdom) L Johnson (Tunisia) S Mansouri	7	6
Alt	(Netherlands) G Brouwer (United Kingdom) A McHugh	5	1
(India) A Chandrasekar (Mexico) H Hach Verdugo	3	4
(India) RC Bollipalli (India) N Kaliyanda Poonacha	6	6

Final
1	(United Kingdom) L Johnson (Tunisia) S Mansouri	6^{4}	5
(India) RC Bollipalli (India) N Kaliyanda Poonacha	7^{7}	7
