= 2017 Torneo Internacional Challenger León – Singles =

Singles
- 2017 Torneo Internacional Challenger León

Final
- Champion: (Spain) Adrián Menéndez Maceiras
- Runner-up: (Ecuador) Roberto Quiroz
- Score: 6–4, 3–6, 6–3

Events
Singles	Doubles
- Torneo Internacional Challenger León

Michael Berrer was the defending champion but chose not to defend his title.

Adrián Menéndez Maceiras won the title after defeating Roberto Quiroz 6–4, 3–6, 6–3 in the final.

== Seeds ==
1. (Dominican Republic) Víctor Estrella Burgos (quarterfinals)
2. (United States) Ernesto Escobedo (second round)
3. (Canada) Vasek Pospisil (quarterfinals)
4. (United States) Stefan Kozlov (second round)
5. (Brazil) João Souza (second round)
6. (United States) Tennys Sandgren (second round)
7. (Russia) Teymuraz Gabashvili (quarterfinals)
8. (Chinese Taipei) Jason Jung (first round)

== Draw ==
Key

- Q = Qualifier
- WC = Wild card
- LL = Lucky loser
- Alt = Alternate
- ITF = ITF entry
- PR = Protected ranking
- SR = Special ranking
- SE = Special exempt
- JE = Junior exempt
- JR = Junior Accelerator Programme entrant
- CO = College Accelerator Programme entrant
- NG = Next Gen Accelerator Program entrant
- w/o = Walkover
- r = Retired
- d = Defaulted

=== Finals ===
Semifinals
Q	(Ecuador) Roberto Quiroz	6	6
(United States) Rajeev Ram	4	3
Alt	(Chile) Nicolás Jarry	5	4
Q	(Spain) Adrián Menéndez Maceiras	7	6

Final
Q	(Ecuador) Roberto Quiroz	4	6	3
Q	(Spain) Adrián Menéndez Maceiras	6	3	6

=== Top half ===
First round
1	(Dominican Republic) V Estrella Burgos	4	7^{7}	6
(United States) D Novikov	6	6^{1}	0
LL	(United Kingdom) L Broady	6	6
SE	(Canada) D Shapovalov	2	3
(Argentina) F Coria	4	6	6
WC	(Mexico) T Hank	6	4	4
Q	(Ecuador) R Quiroz	6	6
8	(Chinese Taipei) J Jung	1	2
4	(United States) S Kozlov	6	6
Q	(Serbia) D Petrović	4	2
(United States) R Ram	6	2	6
(United States) A Sarkissian	3	6	4
(El Salvador) M Arévalo	6^{4}	2
(Bosnia and Herzegovina) M Bašić	7^{7}	6
(Netherlands) I Sijsling	4	4
5	(Brazil) J Souza	6	6

Second round
1	(Dominican Republic) V Estrella Burgos	6	6
LL	(United Kingdom) L Broady	2	2
(Argentina) F Coria	5	1
Q	(Ecuador) R Quiroz	7	6
4	(United States) S Kozlov	1	6^{4}
(United States) R Ram	6	7^{7}
(Bosnia and Herzegovina) M Bašić	6	3	7^{8}
5	(Brazil) J Souza	2	6	6^{6}

Quarterfinals
1	(Dominican Republic) V Estrella Burgos	6^{4}	4
Q	(Ecuador) R Quiroz	7^{7}	6
(United States) R Ram	7^{7}	6
(Bosnia and Herzegovina) M Bašić	6^{2}	3

Semifinals
Q	(Ecuador) R Quiroz	6	6
(United States) R Ram	4	3

=== Bottom half ===
First round
6	(United States) T Sandgren	2	7^{7}	6
Alt	(United States) M McDonald	6	6^{2}	3
(Egypt) M Safwat	0	4
Alt	(Chile) N Jarry	6	6
Q	(Germany) Y Hanfmann	6	6
(Australia) J-P Smith	2	2
(Japan) A Santillan	3	6	6^{5}
3	(Canada) V Pospisil	6	3	7^{7}
7	(Russia) T Gabashvili	6	6
WC	(Mexico) S González	2	4
(Serbia) P Krstin	4	4
(United States) M Krueger	6	6
WC	(Mexico) H Hach Verdugo	6	4	5
Q	(Spain) A Menéndez Maceiras	4	6	7
WC	(Mexico) M Sánchez	3	6	3
2	(United States) E Escobedo	6	3	6

Second round
6	(United States) T Sandgren	6	4	5
Alt	(Chile) N Jarry	2	6	7
Q	(Germany) Y Hanfmann	6^{2}	4
3	(Canada) V Pospisil	7^{7}	6
7	(Russia) T Gabashvili	7^{7}	6
(United States) M Krueger	6^{1}	4
Q	(Spain) A Menéndez Maceiras	1	6	6
2	(United States) E Escobedo	6	3	3

Quarterfinals
Alt	(Chile) N Jarry	3	7	7^{7}
3	(Canada) V Pospisil	6	5	6^{2}
7	(Russia) T Gabashvili	7^{7}	4	3
Q	(Spain) A Menéndez Maceiras	6^{5}	6	6

Semifinals
Alt	(Chile) N Jarry	5	4
Q	(Spain) A Menéndez Maceiras	7	6
