= 2014 Challenger Ficrea =

Tennis tournament

- Date: 31 March – 6 April
- Edition: 12th
- Draw: 32S / 16D
- Prize money: $35,000+H
- Surface: Hard
- Location: León, Mexico

Champions

Singles
- (United States) Rajeev Ram

Doubles
- (Australia) Samuel Groth / (Australia) Chris Guccione
← 2013 ·	Challenger Ficrea	· 2015 →

The 2014 Challenger Ficrea, presentado por ultra was a professional tennis tournament played on hard courts. It was the twelfth edition of the tournament which was part of the 2014 ATP Challenger Tour. It took place in León, Mexico between 31 March and 6 April 2013.

== Singles main-draw entrants ==
=== Seeds ===
Country	Player	Rank	Seed
AUS	Matthew Ebden	67	1
RUS	Alex Bogomolov Jr.	94	2
GER	Dustin Brown	102	3
FRA	Pierre-Hugues Herbert	135	4
USA	Rajeev Ram	141	5
JPN	Yūichi Sugita	154	6
AUS	Samuel Groth	171	7
JPN	Hiroki Moriya	172	8

=== Other entrants ===
The following players received wildcards into the singles main draw:

- (Mexico) Mauricio Astorga
- (Mexico) Luis Patiño
- (Mexico) Lucas Gómez
- (Russia) Alex Bogomolov Jr.

The following players received entry from the qualifying draw:

- (Mexico) Daniel Garza
- (United States) Kevin King
- (New Zealand) Marcus Daniell
- (India) Purav Raja

== Doubles main-draw entrants ==
=== Seeds ===
Country	Player	Country	Player	Rank	Seed
IND	Purav Raja	IND	Divij Sharan	134	1
AUS	Samuel Groth	AUS	Chris Guccione	142	2
BRA	Marcelo Demoliner	AUS	John-Patrick Smith	173	3
GER	Dustin Brown	GER	Rajeev Ram	184	4

=== Other entrants ===
The following pairs received wildcards into the doubles main draw:

- (Mexico) Lucas Gómez / (Argentina) Agustín Velotti
- (Mexico) Antonio Ruiz-Rosales / (Mexico) Manuel Sánchez
- (Mexico) Daniel Garza / (Mexico) Alejandro Moreno Figueroa

== Champions ==
=== Singles ===
- (United States) Rajeev Ram def. (Australia) Samuel Groth, 6–2, 6–2

=== Doubles ===
- (Australia) Samuel Groth / (Australia) Chris Guccione def. (New Zealand) Marcus Daniell / (New Zealand) Artem Sitak, 6–4, 6–3
