= 2016 Torneo Internacional Challenger León =

- Date: 28 March – 3 April
- Edition: 14th
- Draw: 32S / 16D
- Prize money: $75,000+H
- Surface: Hard
- Location: León, Mexico

Champions

Singles
- (Germany) Michael Berrer

Doubles
- (Mexico) Santiago González / (Croatia) Mate Pavić
← 2015 ·	Torneo Internacional Challenger León	· 2017 →

The 2016 Torneo Internacional Challenger León was a professional tennis tournament played on hard courts. It was the fourteenth edition of the tournament which was part of the 2016 ATP Challenger Tour. It took place in León, Mexico between 28 March and 3 April 2015.

== Singles main-draw entrants ==
=== Seeds ===
Country	Player	Rank^{1}	Seed
AUS	Sam Groth	77	1
USA	Taylor Fritz	81	2
TUN	Malek Jaziri	92	3
JPN	Yūichi Sugita	97	4
USA	Austin Krajicek	104	5
GER	Michael Berrer	118	6
FRA	Stéphane Robert	119	7
JPN	Tatsuma Ito	120	8

- ^{1} Rankings are as of March 21, 2016.

=== Other entrants ===
The following players received wildcards into the singles main draw:

- (Mexico) Lucas Gómez
- (Mexico) Hans Hach Verdugo
- (Mexico) Tigre Hank
- (Mexico) Alejandro Moreno Figueroa

The following players received entry from the qualifying draw:

- (Ecuador) Emilio Gómez
- (Czech Republic) Robin Staněk
- (Argentina) Agustín Velotti
- (Brazil) Caio Zampieri

The following players received entry courtesy of a special exempt:

- (El Salvador) Marcelo Arévalo
- (Serbia) Peđa Krstin

The following players received entry as alternates:

- (Argentina) Pedro Cachin
- (Chinese Taipei) Jason Jung
- (United States) Daniel Nguyen
- (Egypt) Mohamed Safwat
- (Brazil) João Souza

== Champions ==
=== Singles ===
- (Germany) Michael Berrer def. (Brazil) João Souza, 6–3, 6–2

=== Doubles ===
- (Mexico) Santiago González / (Croatia) Mate Pavić def. (Australia) Sam Groth / (India) Leander Paes, 6–4, 3–6, [13–11]
