= 2015 Torneo Internacional Challenger León =

- Date: 6 April – 12 April
- Edition: 13th
- Draw: 32S / 16D
- Prize money: $75,000+H
- Surface: Hard
- Location: León, Mexico

Champions

Singles
- (United States) Austin Krajicek

Doubles
- (United States) Austin Krajicek / (United States) Rajeev Ram
← 2014 ·	Torneo Internacional Challenger León	· 2016 →

The 2015 Torneo Internacional Challenger León was a professional tennis tournament played on hard courts. It was the thirteenth edition of the tournament which was part of the 2015 ATP Challenger Tour. It took place in León, Mexico between 6 April and 12 April 2015.

== Singles main-draw entrants ==
=== Seeds ===
Country	Player	Rank^{1}	Seed
ESP	Adrián Menéndez Maceiras	126	1
COL	Alejandro Falla	133	2
USA	Rajeev Ram	139	3
USA	Austin Krajicek	146	4
ARG	Horacio Zeballos	148	5
POL	Michał Przysiężny	149	6
AUT	Gerald Melzer	168	7
USA	Chase Buchanan	173	8

- ^{1} Rankings are as of March 23, 2015.

=== Other entrants ===
The following players received wildcards into the singles main draw:

- (Mexico) Kevin Jack Carpenter
- (Mexico) Lucas Gómez
- (Mexico) Tigre Hank
- (Mexico) Alan Núñez Aguilera

The following players received entry from the qualifying draw:

- (Colombia) Nicolás Barrientos
- (United States) Kevin King
- (United States) Adam El Mihdawy
- (Brazil) Caio Zampieri

The following players received entry as a special exempt:

- (Brazil) Henrique Cunha

The following players received entry as an alternate:

- (Ecuador) Giovanni Lapentti

== Champions ==
=== Singles ===
- (United States) Austin Krajicek def. (Spain) Adrián Menéndez Maceiras, 6–7^{(3–7)}, 7–6^{(7–5)}, 6–4

=== Doubles ===
- (United States) Austin Krajicek / (United States) Rajeev Ram def. (Argentina) Guillermo Durán / (Argentina) Horacio Zeballos, 6–2, 7–5
