= 2012 Torneo Internacional AGT =

- Date: 9–15 April
- Edition: 10th
- Surface: Hard
- Location: León, Mexico

Champions

Singles
- (United States) Denis Zivkovic

Doubles
- (Australia) John Peers / (Australia) John-Patrick Smith
← 2011 ·	Torneo Internacional AGT	· 2013 →

The 2012 Torneo Internacional AGT was a professional tennis tournament played on hard courts. It was the tenth edition of the tournament which was part of the 2012 ATP Challenger Tour. It took place in León, Mexico between 9 and 15 April 2012.

== ATP entrants ==
=== Seeds ===
Country	Player	Rank^{1}	Seed
AUS	Marinko Matosevic	121	1
USA	Rajeev Ram	137	2
ITA	Matteo Viola	172	3
CZE	Jan Mertl	181	4
CAN	Érik Chvojka	217	5
GBR	Jamie Baker	220	6
CAN	Pierre-Ludovic Duclos	232	7
MDA	Roman Borvanov	236	8

- ^{1} Rankings are as of April 2, 2012.

=== Other entrants ===
The following players received wildcards into the singles main draw:

- (Mexico) Miguel Gallardo Valles
- (Australia) Marinko Matosevic
- (Mexico) César Ramírez
- (Mexico) Manuel Sanchez

The following players received entry as an alternate into the singles main draw:

- (Australia) John-Patrick Smith

The following players received entry from the qualifying draw:

- (Australia) Colin Ebelthite
- (Australia) John Peers
- (Mexico) Bruno Rodriguez
- (United States) Denis Zivkovic

The following players received entry as a lucky loser:

- (Guatemala) Christopher Díaz Figueroa

== Champions ==
=== Singles ===
- (United States) Denis Zivkovic def. (United States) Rajeev Ram, 7–6^{(7–5)}, 6–4

=== Doubles ===
- (Australia) John Peers / (Australia) John-Patrick Smith def. (Mexico) César Ramírez / (Mexico) Bruno Rodríguez, 6–3, 6–3
