= 2013 Torneo Internacional AGT =

- Date: 1–7 April
- Edition: 11th
- Draw: 32S / 16D
- Prize money: $35,000+H
- Surface: Hard
- Location: León, Mexico

Champions

Singles
- (United States) Donald Young

Doubles
- (Australia) Chris Guccione / (Australia) Matt Reid
← 2012 ·	Torneo Internacional AGT	· 2014 →

The 2013 Torneo Internacional AGT was a professional tennis tournament played on hard courts. It was the eleventh edition of the tournament which was part of the 2013 ATP Challenger Tour. It took place in León, Mexico between 1 and 7 April 2013.

== Singles main-draw entrants ==
=== Seeds ===
Country	Player	Rank^{1}	Seed
TPE	Lu Yen-hsun	73	1
USA	Rajeev Ram	104	2
FRA	Adrian Mannarino	120	3
ISR	Dudi Sela	127	4
AUS	John Millman	130	5
ESP	Daniel Muñoz de la Nava	132	6
CRO	Antonio Veić	135	7
RUS	Alex Bogomolov Jr.	137	8

- ^{1} Rankings are as of March 18, 2013.

=== Other entrants ===
The following players received wildcards into the singles main draw:

- (Mexico) Mauricio Astorga
- (Russia) Alex Bogomolov Jr.
- (Italy) Erik Crepaldi
- (Chile) Nicolás Massú

The following players received entry as a special exempt into the singles main draw:

- (Italy) Alessio di Mauro

The following players received entry from the qualifying draw:

- (France) Antoine Benneteau
- (Italy) Thomas Fabbiano
- (Croatia) Franko Škugor
- (United States) Denis Zivkovic

The following player received entry as a lucky loser:

- (Australia) John-Patrick Smith

== Doubles main-draw entrants ==
=== Seeds ===
Country	Player	Country	Player	Rank^{1}	Seed
USA	Nicholas Monroe	GER	Simon Stadler	141	1
GBR	Jamie Murray	AUS	John Peers	156	2
THA	Sanchai Ratiwatana	THA	Sonchat Ratiwatana	158	3
IND	Purav Raja	IND	Divij Sharan	246	4

- ^{1} Rankings as of March 18, 2013.

=== Other entrants ===
The following pairs received wildcards into the doubles main draw:

- (Mexico) Mauricio Astorga / (Mexico) Manuel Sánchez
- (Mexico) Juan Manuel Elizondo / (Chile) Nicolás Massú
- (Mexico) Alfredo Moreno / (Mexico) Alejandro Moreno Figueroa

== Champions ==
=== Singles ===
- (United States) Donald Young def. (Chinese Taipei) Jimmy Wang, 6–2, 6–2

=== Doubles ===
- (Australia) Chris Guccione / (Australia) Matt Reid def. (India) Purav Raja / (India) Divij Sharan, 6–3, 7–5
