= 2023 León Open – Singles =

Singles
- 2023 León Open

Final
- Champion: (France) Giovanni Mpetshi Perricard
- Runner-up: (Argentina) Juan Pablo Ficovich
- Score: 6–7^{(5–7)}, 7–6^{(8–6)}, 7–6^{(7–3)}

Events
Singles	Doubles
León Open	· 2024 →

Blaž Rola was the defending champion but chose not to defend his title.

Giovanni Mpetshi Perricard won the title after defeating Juan Pablo Ficovich 6–7^{(5–7)}, 7–6^{(8–6)}, 7–6^{(7–3)} in the final.

== Seeds ==
1. (Australia) James Duckworth (quarterfinals)
2. (Argentina) Facundo Bagnis (second round)
3. (Switzerland) Antoine Bellier (quarterfinals)
4. (Argentina) Renzo Olivo (second round)
5. (France) Antoine Escoffier (first round)
6. (Argentina) Thiago Agustín Tirante (second round)
7. (Austria) Maximilian Neuchrist (semifinals)
8. (Argentina) Juan Pablo Ficovich (final)

== Draw ==
=== Key ===
- Q = Qualifier
- WC = Wild card
- LL = Lucky loser
- Alt = Alternate
- SE = Special exempt
- PR = Protected ranking
- ITF = ITF entry
- JE = Junior exempt
- w/o = Walkover
- r = Retired
- d = Defaulted
- SR = Special ranking

=== Finals ===
Semifinals
8	(Argentina) Juan Pablo Ficovich	3	6	6
(Tunisia) Aziz Dougaz	6	4	4
Q	(France) Giovanni Mpetshi Perricard	7^{7}	7^{7}
7	(Austria) Maximilian Neuchrist	6^{5}	6^{4}

Final
8	(Argentina) Juan Pablo Ficovich	7^{7}	6^{6}	6^{3}
Q	(France) Giovanni Mpetshi Perricard	6^{5}	7^{8}	7^{7}

=== Top half ===
First round
1	(Australia) J Duckworth	7^{7}	6
(Tunisia) S Mansouri	6^{4}	2
Alt	(Kazakhstan) D Yevseyev	5	5
Q	(Zimbabwe) B Lock	7	7
WC	(Mexico) R Pacheco Méndez	1	2
(France) T Atmane	6	6
Alt	(Ukraine) V Sachko	3	2
8	(Argentina) JP Ficovich	6	6
4	(Argentina) R Olivo	6	6
(Argentina) F Mena	2	1
(Tunisia) A Dougaz	6	6
(Argentina) RA Burruchaga	3	4
(United States) O Crawford	6	3	6
(Brazil) JL Reis da Silva	3	6	3
(Colombia) N Mejía	6	6^{3}	6
5	(France) A Escoffier	1	7^{7}	3

Second round
1	(Australia) J Duckworth	6	6
Q	(Zimbabwe) B Lock	3	4
(France) T Atmane	4	6	5
8	(Argentina) JP Ficovich	6	4	7
4	(Argentina) R Olivo	2	4
(Tunisia) A Dougaz	6	6
(United States) O Crawford	6^{6}	6^{4}
(Colombia) N Mejía	7^{8}	7^{7}

Quarterfinals
1	(Australia) J Duckworth	6^{3}	6	3
8	(Argentina) JP Ficovich	7^{7}	3	6
(Tunisia) A Dougaz	6	3	6
(Colombia) N Mejía	4	6	3

Semifinals
8	(Argentina) JP Ficovich	3	6	6
(Tunisia) A Dougaz	6	4	4

=== Bottom half ===
First round
6	(Argentina) TA Tirante	2	7	6
(Canada) A Galarneau	6	5	2
Q	(United States) N Chappell	1	6	2
Q	(France) G Mpetshi Perricard	6	4	6
Q	(Australia) A Walton	6	6
(Paraguay) AD Vallejo	4	3
(Argentina) F Comesaña	6^{2}	6	4
3	(Switzerland) A Bellier	7^{7}	3	6
7	(Austria) M Neuchrist	4	7^{7}	6
Q	(United States) Christian Langmo	6	6^{5}	4
WC	(Mexico) AF Rubio Fierros	3	2
(China) Y Bu	6	6
(United States) E Zhu	3	4
(Germany) Elmar Ejupovic	6	6
Q	(Chinese Taipei) J Jung	6	3	2
2/WC	(Argentina) F Bagnis	4	6	6

Second round
6	(Argentina) TA Tirante	6	6^{2}	4
Q	(France) G Mpetshi Perricard	4	7^{7}	6
Q	(Australia) A Walton	6^{1}	6^{5}
3	(Switzerland) A Bellier	7^{7}	7^{7}
7	(Austria) M Neuchrist	6	6
(China) Y Bu	4	3
(Germany) E Ejupovic	6	3	6
2/WC	(Argentina) F Bagnis	4	6	3

Quarterfinals
Q	(France) G Mpetshi Perricard	6	3	6
3	(Switzerland) A Bellier	1	6	3
7	(Austria) M Neuchrist	4	6	7^{7}
(Germany) E Ejupovic	6	4	6^{4}

Semifinals
Q	(France) G Mpetshi Perricard	7^{7}	7^{7}
7	(Austria) M Neuchrist	6^{5}	6^{4}
