= 2015 Torneo Internacional Challenger León – Singles =

Singles
- 2015 Torneo Internacional Challenger León

Final
- Champion: (United States) Austin Krajicek
- Runner-up: (Spain) Adrián Menéndez Maceiras
- Score: 6–7^{(3–7)}, 7–6^{(7–5)}, 6–4

Events
| Singles | Doubles |
- Torneo Internacional Challenger León

Rajeev Ram was the defending champion, but lost in the second round to Daniel Nguyen.

Austin Krajicek won the title, defeating Adrián Menéndez Maceiras 6–7^{(3–7)}, 7–6^{(7–5)}, 6–4 in the final.

== Seeds ==
1. (Spain) Adrián Menéndez Maceiras (final)
2. (Colombia) Alejandro Falla (semifinals)
3. (United States) Rajeev Ram (second round)
4. (United States) Austin Krajicek (champion)
5. (Argentina) Horacio Zeballos (semifinals)
6. (Poland) Michał Przysiężny (first round)
7. (Austria) Gerald Melzer (quarterfinals)
8. (United States) Chase Buchanan (second round)

== Draw ==
Key

- Q = Qualifier
- WC = Wild card
- LL = Lucky loser
- Alt = Alternate
- ITF = ITF entry
- PR = Protected ranking
- SR = Special ranking
- SE = Special exempt
- JE = Junior exempt
- JR = Junior Accelerator Programme entrant
- CO = College Accelerator Programme entrant
- NG = Next Gen Accelerator Program entrant
- w/o = Walkover
- r = Retired
- d = Defaulted

=== Finals ===
Semifinals
1 | (Spain) Adrián Menéndez Maceiras | 7^{7} | 5 | 6
5 | (Argentina) Horacio Zeballos | 6^{3} | 7 | 4
4 | (United States) Austin Krajicek | 6 | 7^{7}
2 | (Colombia) Alejandro Falla | 1 | 6^{3}

Final
1 | (Spain) Adrián Menéndez Maceiras | 7^{7} | 6^{5} | 4
4 | (United States) Austin Krajicek | 6^{3} | 7^{7} | 6

=== Top half ===
First round
1 | (Spain) A Menéndez Maceiras | 6 | 4 | 6
(Argentina) JI Londero | 1 | 6 | 3
WC | (Mexico) L Gómez | 7^{7} | 7
(United Kingdom) B Klein | 6^{4} | 5
(United States) J Jung | 2 | 6^{5}
(Germany) N Langer | 6 | 7^{7}
(Australia) D Propoggia | 4 | 6^{7}
7 | (Austria) G Melzer | 6 | 7^{9}
3 | (United States) R Ram | 6 | 6
(Netherlands) A van der Duim | 1 | 3
(United States) D Nguyen | 6 | 6
(United States) Connor Smith | 3 | 2
Q | (Brazil) C Zampieri | 4 | 4
(Colombia) E Struvay | 6 | 6
WC | (Mexico) T Hank | 5 | 2
5 | (Argentina) H Zeballos | 7 | 6

Second round
1 | (Spain) A Menéndez Maceiras | 6 | 6
WC | (Mexico) L Gómez | 3 | 3
(Germany) N Langer | 4 | 7^{7} | 2
7 | (Austria) G Melzer | 6 | 6^{3} | 6
3 | (United States) R Ram | 4 | 6 | 3
(United States) D Nguyen | 6 | 4 | 6
(Colombia) E Struvay | 1 | 2
5 | (Argentina) H Zeballos | 6 | 6

Quarterfinals
1 | (Spain) A Menéndez Maceiras | 6 | 7^{7}
7 | (Austria) G Melzer | 2 | 6^{5}
(United States) D Nguyen | 2 | 3
5 | (Argentina) H Zeballos | 6 | 6

Semifinals
1 | (Spain) A Menéndez Maceiras | 7^{7} | 5 | 6
5 | (Argentina) H Zeballos | 6^{3} | 7 | 4

=== Bottom half ===
First round
8 | (United States) C Buchanan | 6 | 6
Q | (United States) K King | 4 | 2
WC | (Mexico) Alan Núñez Aguilera | 3 | 2
Q | (United States) A El Mihdawy | 6 | 6
SE | (Brazil) Henrique Cunha | 5 | 6 | 7^{7}
(Ecuador) G Escobar | 7 | 4 | 6^{5}
(El Salvador) M Arévalo | 6^{2} | 2
4 | (United States) A Krajicek | 7^{7} | 6
6 | (Poland) M Przysiężny | 4 | 3
Q | (Colombia) N Barrientos | 6 | 6
(Argentina) R Olivo | 3 | 4
Alt | (Ecuador) G Lapentti | 6 | 6
(Argentina) G Pella | 6 | 6
(Argentina) A Molteni | 4 | 0
WC | (Mexico) Kevin Jack Carpenter | 4 | 1
2 | (Colombia) A Falla | 6 | 6

Second round
8 | (United States) C Buchanan | 4 | 6 | 4
Q | (United States) A El Mihdawy | 6 | 0 | 6
SE | (Brazil) H Cunha | 4 | 4
4 | (United States) A Krajicek | 6 | 6
Q | (Colombia) N Barrientos | 2 | 2
Alt | (Ecuador) G Lapentti | 6 | 6
(Argentina) G Pella | 3 | 3
2 | (Colombia) A Falla | 6 | 6

Quarterfinals
Q | (United States) A El Mihdawy | 3 | 4
4 | (United States) A Krajicek | 6 | 6
Alt | (Ecuador) G Lapentti | 2 | 6 | 2
2 | (Colombia) A Falla | 6 | 3 | 6

Semifinals
4 | (United States) A Krajicek | 6 | 7^{7}
2 | (Colombia) A Falla | 1 | 6^{3}
