= 2019 Torneo Internacional Challenger León – Singles =

Singles
- 2019 Torneo Internacional Challenger León

Final
- Champion: (Slovenia) Blaž Rola
- Runner-up: (United Kingdom) Liam Broady
- Score: 6–4, 4–6, 6–3

Events
Singles	Doubles
- Torneo Internacional Challenger León

Christopher Eubanks was the defending champion but lost in the second round to Liam Broady.

Blaž Rola won the title after defeating Broady 6–4, 4–6, 6–3 in the final.

== Seeds ==
All seeds receive a bye into the second round.

1. (Kazakhstan) Alexander Bublik (semifinals, retired)
2. (Spain) Adrián Menéndez Maceiras (third round)
3. (United States) Christopher Eubanks (second round)
4. (Germany) Dustin Brown (second round)
5. (Austria) Sebastian Ofner (quarterfinals)
6. (Bosnia and Herzegovina) Mirza Bašić (third round)
7. (United Kingdom) James Ward (semifinals)
8. (Egypt) Mohamed Safwat (third round)
9. (Serbia) Peđa Krstin (third round)
10. (United States) Donald Young (second round)
11. (Barbados) Darian King (third round)
12. (Ecuador) Roberto Quiroz (quarterfinals)
13. (Australia) John-Patrick Smith (second round)
14. (Slovenia) Blaž Rola (champion)
15. (Austria) Lucas Miedler (third round)
16. (El Salvador) Marcelo Arévalo (quarterfinals)

== Draw ==
Key

- Q = Qualifier
- WC = Wild card
- LL = Lucky loser
- Alt = Alternate
- ITF = ITF entry
- PR = Protected ranking
- SR = Special ranking
- SE = Special exempt
- JE = Junior exempt
- JR = Junior Accelerator Programme entrant
- CO = College Accelerator Programme entrant
- NG = Next Gen Accelerator Program entrant
- w/o = Walkover
- r = Retired
- d = Defaulted

=== Finals ===
Quarterfinals
1	(Kazakhstan) Alexander Bublik	6	7^{7}
12	(Ecuador) Roberto Quiroz	4	6^{3}
(United Kingdom) Liam Broady	7	4	6
5	(Austria) Sebastian Ofner	5	6	3
(Ecuador) Gonzalo Escobar	6^{7}	3
14	(Slovenia) Blaž Rola	7^{9}	6
7	(United Kingdom) James Ward	6	6
16	(El Salvador) Marcelo Arévalo	3	4

Semifinals
1	(Kazakhstan) Alexander Bublik	2	0^{r}
(United Kingdom) Liam Broady	6	0
14	(Slovenia) Blaž Rola	6^{5}	6	7^{9}
7	(United Kingdom) James Ward	7^{7}	3	6^{7}

Final
(United Kingdom) Liam Broady	4	6	3
14	(Slovenia) Blaž Rola	6	4	6

=== Top half ===
==== Section 1 ====
First round
(United States) Mi Redlicki	2	6^{r}
(Netherlands) S Griekspoor	6	6
(Serbia) D Petrović	6	6
LL	(Argentina) C Ugo Carabelli	2	2
WC	(Mexico) L Gómez	7^{7}	6
Q	(Colombia) Felipe Mantilla	6^{5}	4
WC	(United States) Milledge Cossu	2	2
Q	(United States) Ma Redlicki	6	6

Second round
1	(Kazakhstan) A Bublik	7^{16}	6
(Netherlands) S Griekspoor	6^{14}	3
(Serbia) D Petrović	6	6
13	(Australia) J-P Smith	3	4
12	(Ecuador) R Quiroz	3	7	6
WC	(Mexico) L Gómez	6	5	3
Q	(United States) Ma Redlicki	2	5
6	(Bosnia and Herzegovina) M Bašić	6	7

Third round
1	(Kazakhstan) A Bublik	7^{7}	7
(Serbia) D Petrović	6^{0}	5
12	(Ecuador) R Quiroz	5	6	6
6	(Bosnia and Herzegovina) M Bašić	7	3	4

Quarterfinals
1	(Kazakhstan) A Bublik	6	7^{7}
12	(Ecuador) R Quiroz	4	6^{3}

==== Section 2 ====
First round
(United Kingdom) L Broady	6	6
(Argentina) R Olivo	2	3
ITF	(Brazil) J Menezes	3	4
ITF	(Spain) A Artuñedo	6	6
(Spain) R Ortega Olmedo	6	6
(Japan) Y Takahashi	4	4
PR	(Spain) C Gómez-Herrera	6	6
WC	(Mexico) G López Villaseñor	4	3

Second round
3	(United States) C Eubanks	6^{5}	6	4
(United Kingdom) L Broady	7^{7}	2	6
ITF	(Spain) A Artuñedo	3	3
15	(Austria) L Miedler	6	6
9	(Serbia) P Krstin	7^{7}	6
(Spain) R Ortega Olmedo	6^{4}	3
PR	(Spain) C Gómez-Herrera	2	6^{6}
5	(Austria) S Ofner	6	7^{8}

Third round
(United Kingdom) L Broady	1	7^{7}	6
15	(Austria) L Miedler	6	6^{5}	3
9	(Serbia) P Krstin	6	4	3
5	(Austria) S Ofner	2	6	6

Quarterfinals
(United Kingdom) L Broady	7	4	6
5	(Austria) S Ofner	5	6	3

=== Bottom half ===
==== Section 3 ====
First round
(Norway) V Durasovic	6^{2}	4
(Croatia) B Gojo	7^{7}	6
(Ecuador) G Escobar	6^{5}	7^{7}	6
(United States) K King	7^{7}	6^{5}	2
(Dominican Republic) V Estrella Burgos	6^{3}	2
(Switzerland) M-A Hüsler	7^{7}	6
ITF	(France) M Guinard	6	6
(Croatia) A Pavić	4	2

Second round
8	(Egypt) M Safwat	6^{4}	6	6
(Croatia) B Gojo	7^{7}	1	4
(Ecuador) G Escobar	6	7
10	(United States) D Young	3	5
14	(Slovenia) B Rola	7	6
(Switzerland) M-A Hüsler	5	3
ITF	(France) M Guinard	6	6
4	(Germany) D Brown	4	2

Third round
8	(Egypt) M Safwat	7	4	3
(Ecuador) G Escobar	5	6	6
14	(Slovenia) B Rola	6	6
ITF	(France) M Guinard	2	1

Quarterfinals
(Ecuador) G Escobar	6^{7}	3
14	(Slovenia) B Rola	7^{9}	6

==== Section 4 ====
First round
(Argentina) MF Descotte	3	2
ITF	(France) Baptiste Crepatte	6	6
ITF	(Tunisia) S Mansouri	6	7^{7}
(United States) E Escobedo	4	6^{3}
WC	(Mexico) L Patiño	1	2
(United States) A Sarkissian	6	6
(Brazil) T Seyboth Wild	6	3	7^{7}
(United States) E King	3	6	6^{4}

Second round
7	(United Kingdom) J Ward	6	6
ITF	(France) B Crepatte	3	4
ITF	(Tunisia) S Mansouri	3	2
11	(Barbados) D King	6	6
16	(El Salvador) M Arévalo	6^{3}	7	7^{7}
(United States) A Sarkissian	7^{7}	5	6^{4}
(Brazil) T Seyboth Wild	3	7	4
2	(Spain) A Menéndez Maceiras	6	5	6

Third round
7	(United Kingdom) J Ward	6	6
11	(Barbados) D King	1	4
16	(El Salvador) M Arévalo	6	7
2	(Spain) A Menéndez Maceiras	3	5

Quarterfinals
7	(United Kingdom) J Ward	6	6
16	(El Salvador) M Arévalo	3	4
