= 2024 GNP Seguros Tennis Open =

- Date: 15–20 April
- Edition: 2nd
- Surface: Hard
- Location: Acapulco, Mexico
- Venue: Arena GNP Seguros

Champions

Singles
- (France) Giovanni Mpetshi Perricard

Doubles
- (India) Rithvik Choudary Bollipalli / (India) Niki Kaliyanda Poonacha
| ← 2023 · | GNP Seguros Tennis Open | · 2025 → |

The 2024 GNP Seguros Tennis Open was a professional tennis tournament played on hard courts. It was the 2nd edition of the tournament which was part of the 2024 ATP Challenger Tour. It took place in Acapulco, Mexico between 15 and 20 April 2024.

== Singles main-draw entrants ==
=== Seeds ===
| Country | Player | Rank^{1} | Seed |
|---|---|---|---|
| AUS | Rinky Hijikata | 80 | 1 |
| USA | Michael Mmoh | 110 | 2 |
| USA | Zachary Svajda | 129 | 3 |
| AUS | Adam Walton | 135 | 4 |
| FRA | Giovanni Mpetshi Perricard | 160 | 5 |
| CAN | Alexis Galarneau | 176 | 6 |
| KAZ | Beibit Zhukayev | 192 | 7 |
| USA | Maxime Cressy | 193 | 8 |

- ^{1} Rankings are as of April 8, 2024.

=== Other entrants ===
The following players received wildcards into the singles main draw:

- (Mexico) Ernesto Escobedo
- (Mexico) Rodrigo Pacheco Méndez
- (Paraguay) Daniel Vallejo

The following player received entry into the singles main draw as a special exempt:

- (Colombia) Nicolás Mejía

The following player received entry into the singles main draw as an alternate:

- (United Kingdom) Aidan McHugh

The following players received entry from the qualifying draw:

- (Slovenia) Bor Artnak
- (United States) Andre Ilagan
- (Czech Republic) Dominik Palán
- (United States) Nathan Ponwith
- (United States) Ryan Seggerman
- (Brazil) Karue Sell

== Champions ==
=== Singles ===
- (France) Giovanni Mpetshi Perricard def. (Australia) Adam Walton 6–3, 6–3.

=== Doubles ===
- (India) Rithvik Choudary Bollipalli / (India) Niki Kaliyanda Poonacha def. (United Kingdom) Luke Johnson / (Tunisia) Skander Mansouri 7–6^{(7–4)}, 7–5.
