= 2018 Torneo Internacional Challenger León =

- Date: 23–29 April
- Edition: 16th
- Draw: 32S / 16D
- Surface: Hard
- Location: León, Mexico

Champions

Singles
- (United States) Christopher Eubanks

Doubles
- (Ecuador) Gonzalo Escobar / (Mexico) Manuel Sánchez
- Torneo Internacional Challenger León

The 2018 Torneo Internacional Challenger León was a professional tennis tournament played on hard courts. It was the sixteenth edition of the tournament which was part of the 2018 ATP Challenger Tour. It took place in León, Mexico between 23 and 29 April 2018.

== Singles main-draw entrants ==
=== Seeds ===
Country	Player	Rank^{1}	Seed
ESP	Adrián Menéndez Maceiras	156	1
GER	Mats Moraing	158	2
USA	Dennis Novikov	167	3
DOM	Víctor Estrella Burgos	171	4
USA	Kevin King	172	5
BAR	Darian King	179	6
CAN	Filip Peliwo	180	7
ESA	Marcelo Arévalo	181	8

- ^{1} Rankings are as of April 16, 2018.

=== Other entrants ===
The following players received wildcards into the singles main draw:

- (Mexico) Tigre Hank
- (Mexico) Luis Patiño
- (Mexico) José Antonio Rodríguez Rodríguez
- (Mexico) Manuel Sánchez

The following players received entry from the qualifying draw:

- (Dominican Republic) Roberto Cid Subervi
- (Ecuador) Roberto Quiroz
- (New Zealand) Rubin Statham
- (United Kingdom) James Ward

The following player received entry as a lucky loser:

- (Germany) Tobias Simon

== Champions ==
=== Singles ===
- (United States) Christopher Eubanks def. (Australia) John-Patrick Smith 6–4, 3–6, 7–6^{(7–4)}.

=== Doubles ===
- (Ecuador) Gonzalo Escobar / (Mexico) Manuel Sánchez def. (Australia) Bradley Mousley / (Australia) John-Patrick Smith 6–4, 6–4.
