= 2013 Torneo Internacional AGT – Doubles =

Doubles
- 2013 Torneo Internacional AGT

Final
- Champions: (Australia) Chris Guccione (Australia) Matt Reid
- Runners-up: (India) Purav Raja (India) Divij Sharan
- Score: 6–3, 7–5

Events
| Singles | Doubles |
- Torneo Internacional AGT

John Peers and John-Patrick Smith were the defending champions but decided not to participate together.
Peers played alongside Jamie Murray, Smith partnered up with Samuel Groth. Both pairs lost to Marcelo Demoliner and Franko Škugor in the first and second round, respectively.
Chris Guccione and Matt Reid defeated Purav Raja and Divij Sharan 6–3, 7–5 in the final to win the title.

== Seeds ==
1. (United States) Nicholas Monroe / (Germany) Simon Stadler (semifinals)
2. (United Kingdom) Jamie Murray / (Australia) John Peers (first round)
3. (Thailand) Sanchai Ratiwatana / (Thailand) Sonchat Ratiwatana (first round)
4. (India) Purav Raja / (India) Divij Sharan (final)

== Draw ==
Key

- Q = Qualifier
- WC = Wild card
- LL = Lucky loser
- Alt = Alternate
- ITF = ITF entry
- PR = Protected ranking
- SR = Special ranking
- SE = Special exempt
- JE = Junior exempt
- JR = Junior Accelerator Programme entrant
- CO = College Accelerator Programme entrant
- NG = Next Gen Accelerator Program entrant
- w/o = Walkover
- r = Retired
- d = Defaulted

=== Draw ===
First round
1 | (United States) N Monroe (Germany) S Stadler | 6 | 6
WC | (Mexico) Mauricio Astorga (Mexico) M Sánchez | 2 | 1
(Croatia) M Draganja (Croatia) M Pavić | 6^{6} | 6^{3}
(Slovakia) A Martin (Australia) J Millman | 7^{8} | 7^{7}
4 | (India) P Raja (India) D Sharan | 6 | 6
(Chinese Taipei) H-h Lee (Chinese Taipei) H-y Peng | 3 | 3
WC | (Mexico) JM Elizondo (Chile) N Massú | 3 | 6 | [6]
(United States) J Cerretani (Spain) A Menéndez-Maceiras | 6 | 3 | [10]
(United States) A Krajicek (United States) B Reynolds | 6 | 6
WC | (Mexico) Alfredo Moreno (Mexico) Alejandro Moreno Figueroa | 3 | 2
(Australia) C Guccione (Australia) M Reid | 6 | 3 | [10]
3 | (Thailand) Sa Ratiwatana (Thailand) So Ratiwatana | 1 | 6 | [2]
(Australia) S Groth (Australia) J-P Smith | 6 | 6
(Australia) J Kerr (United States) D Young | 2 | 4
(Brazil) M Demoliner (Croatia) F Škugor | 7^{7} | 7^{7}
2 | (United Kingdom) J Murray (Australia) J Peers | 6^{4} | 6^{5}

Quarterfinals
1 | (United States) N Monroe (Germany) S Stadler | 6 | 6
(Slovakia) A Martin (Australia) J Millman | 3 | 3
4 | (India) P Raja (India) D Sharan | 6 | 6
(United States) J Cerretani (Spain) A Menéndez-Maceiras | 4 | 0
(United States) A Krajicek (United States) B Reynolds | 4 | 4
(Australia) C Guccione (Australia) M Reid | 6 | 6
(Australia) S Groth (Australia) J-P Smith | 4 | 4
(Brazil) M Demoliner (Croatia) F Škugor | 6 | 6

Semifinals
1 | (United States) N Monroe (Germany) S Stadler | 4 | 2
4 | (India) P Raja (India) D Sharan | 6 | 6
(Australia) C Guccione (Australia) M Reid | 6 | 6
(Brazil) M Demoliner (Croatia) F Škugor | 3 | 4

Final
4 | (India) P Raja (India) D Sharan | 3 | 5
(Australia) C Guccione (Australia) M Reid | 6 | 7
