= 2023 León Open =

- Date: 10–16 April
- Edition: 1st
- Surface: Hard
- Location: León, Mexico

Champions

Singles
- (France) Giovanni Mpetshi Perricard

Doubles
- (Tunisia) Aziz Dougaz / (France) Antoine Escoffier
León Open	· 2024 →

The 2023 Mextenis León Open was a professional tennis tournament played on hard courts. It was the 1st edition of the tournament which was part of the 2023 ATP Challenger Tour. It took place in León, Mexico between 10 and 16 April 2023.

== Singles main-draw entrants ==
=== Seeds ===
Country	Player	Rank^{1}	Seed
AUS	James Duckworth	110	1
ARG	Facundo Bagnis	113	2
SUI	Antoine Bellier	170	3
ARG	Renzo Olivo	190	4
FRA	Antoine Escoffier	197	5
ARG	Thiago Agustín Tirante	199	6
AUT	Maximilian Neuchrist	206	7
ARG	Juan Pablo Ficovich	223	8

- ^{1} Rankings are as of April 3, 2023.

=== Other entrants ===
The following players received wildcards into the singles main draw:

- (Argentina) Facundo Bagnis
- (Mexico) Rodrigo Pacheco Méndez
- (Mexico) Alan Fernando Rubio Fierros

The following players received entry into the singles main draw as alternates:

- (Ukraine) Vitaliy Sachko
- (Kazakhstan) Denis Yevseyev

The following players received entry from the qualifying draw:

- (United States) Nick Chappell
- (Chinese Taipei) Jason Jung
- (United States) Christian Langmo
- (Zimbabwe) Benjamin Lock
- (France) Giovanni Mpetshi Perricard
- (Australia) Adam Walton

== Champions ==
=== Singles ===
- (France) Giovanni Mpetshi Perricard def. (Argentina) Juan Pablo Ficovich 6–7^{(5–7)}, 7–6^{(8–6)}, 7–6^{(7–3)}.

=== Doubles ===
- (Tunisia) Aziz Dougaz / (France) Antoine Escoffier def. (Austria) Maximilian Neuchrist / (Greece) Michail Pervolarakis 7–6^{(7–5)}, 3–6, [10–5].
