= 2013 Torneo Internacional AGT – Singles =

Singles
- 2013 Torneo Internacional AGT

Final
- Champion: (United States) Donald Young
- Runner-up: (Chinese Taipei) Jimmy Wang
- Score: 6–2, 6–2

Events
Singles	Doubles
- Torneo Internacional AGT

Denis Zivkovic was the defending champion, but lost in the second round to John Millman.
Donald Young defeated Jimmy Wang 6–2, 6–2 in the final to win the title.

== Seeds ==
1. (Chinese Taipei) Lu Yen-hsun (quarterfinals)
2. (United States) Rajeev Ram (withdrew)
3. (France) Adrian Mannarino (first round)
4. (Israel) Dudi Sela (semifinals)
5. (Australia) John Millman (quarterfinals)
6. (Spain) Daniel Muñoz de la Nava (first round)
7. (Croatia) Antonio Veić (first round)
8. (Russia) Alex Bogomolov Jr. (quarterfinals, withdrew)

== Draw ==
Key

- Q = Qualifier
- WC = Wild card
- LL = Lucky loser
- Alt = Alternate
- ITF = ITF entry
- PR = Protected ranking
- SR = Special ranking
- SE = Special exempt
- JE = Junior exempt
- JR = Junior Accelerator Programme entrant
- CO = College Accelerator Programme entrant
- NG = Next Gen Accelerator Program entrant
- w/o = Walkover
- r = Retired
- d = Defaulted

=== Finals ===
Semifinals
(United States) Donald Young	4	7	6
(Israel) Amir Weintraub	6	5	3
4	(Israel) Dudi Sela	6	1	4
(Chinese Taipei) Jimmy Wang	3	6	6

Final
(United States) Donald Young	6	6
(Chinese Taipei) Jimmy Wang	2	2

=== Top half ===
First round
1	(Chinese Taipei) Y-h Lu	6	7^{7}
(France) J Dasnières de Veigy	1	6^{5}
(Spain) A Menéndez Maceiras	6^{2}	6	7^{7}
(Switzerland) M Chiudinelli	7^{7}	3	6^{5}
Q	(France) Antoine Benneteau	5	4
(Germany) P Gojowczyk	7	6
(United States) D Young	6	6
6	(Spain) D Muñoz de la Nava	3	2
3	(France) A Mannarino	7	4	2
(Argentina) A Velotti	5	6	6
LL	(Australia) J-P Smith	4	4
(Israel) A Weintraub	6	6
(France) G Burquier	1	2
(Japan) Y Sugita	6	6
SE	(Italy) A di Mauro	6	6
7	(Croatia) A Veić	3	1

Second round
1	(Chinese Taipei) Y-h Lu	6	7^{7}
(Spain) A Menéndez Maceiras	0	6^{4}
(Germany) P Gojowczyk	3	3
(United States) D Young	6	6
(Argentina) A Velotti	5	3
(Israel) A Weintraub	7	6
(Japan) Y Sugita	6	6
SE	(Italy) A di Mauro	1	1

Quarterfinals
1	(Chinese Taipei) Y-h Lu	3	4
(United States) D Young	6	6
(Israel) A Weintraub	6	6
(Japan) Y Sugita	2	3

Semifinals
(United States) D Young	4	7	6
(Israel) A Weintraub	6	5	3

=== Bottom half ===
First round
8/WC	(Russia) A Bogomolov Jr.	6	6
WC	(Chile) N Massú	2	1
(Croatia) N Mektić	3	4
Q	(Italy) T Fabbiano	6	6
(United States) B Reynolds	6	4	6
(Australia) M Reid	2	6	1
(Czech Republic) J Hernych	6	3	2
4	(Israel) D Sela	3	6	6
5	(Australia) J Millman	6	4	6
WC	(Italy) Erik Crepaldi	3	6	3
WC	(Mexico) Mauricio Astorga	3	2
Q	(United States) D Zivkovic	6	6
(Slovakia) A Martin	4	2
(Chinese Taipei) J Wang	6	6
(Australia) S Groth	6	3	7^{7}
Q	(Croatia) F Škugor	3	6	6^{2}

Second round
8/WC	(Russia) A Bogomolov Jr.	3	6	6
Q	(Italy) T Fabbiano	6	4	4
(United States) B Reynolds	3	6	4
4	(Israel) D Sela	6	1	6
5	(Australia) J Millman	7^{7}	6
Q	(United States) D Zivkovic	6^{5}	1
(Chinese Taipei) J Wang	3	6	7
(Australia) S Groth	6	1	5

Quarterfinals
8/WC	(Russia) A Bogomolov Jr.
4	(Israel) D Sela	w/o
5	(Australia) J Millman	2	6	1
(Chinese Taipei) J Wang	6	3	6

Semifinals
4	(Israel) D Sela	6	1	4
(Chinese Taipei) J Wang	3	6	6
