= Giovanni Mpetshi Perricard =

French tennis player (born 2003)

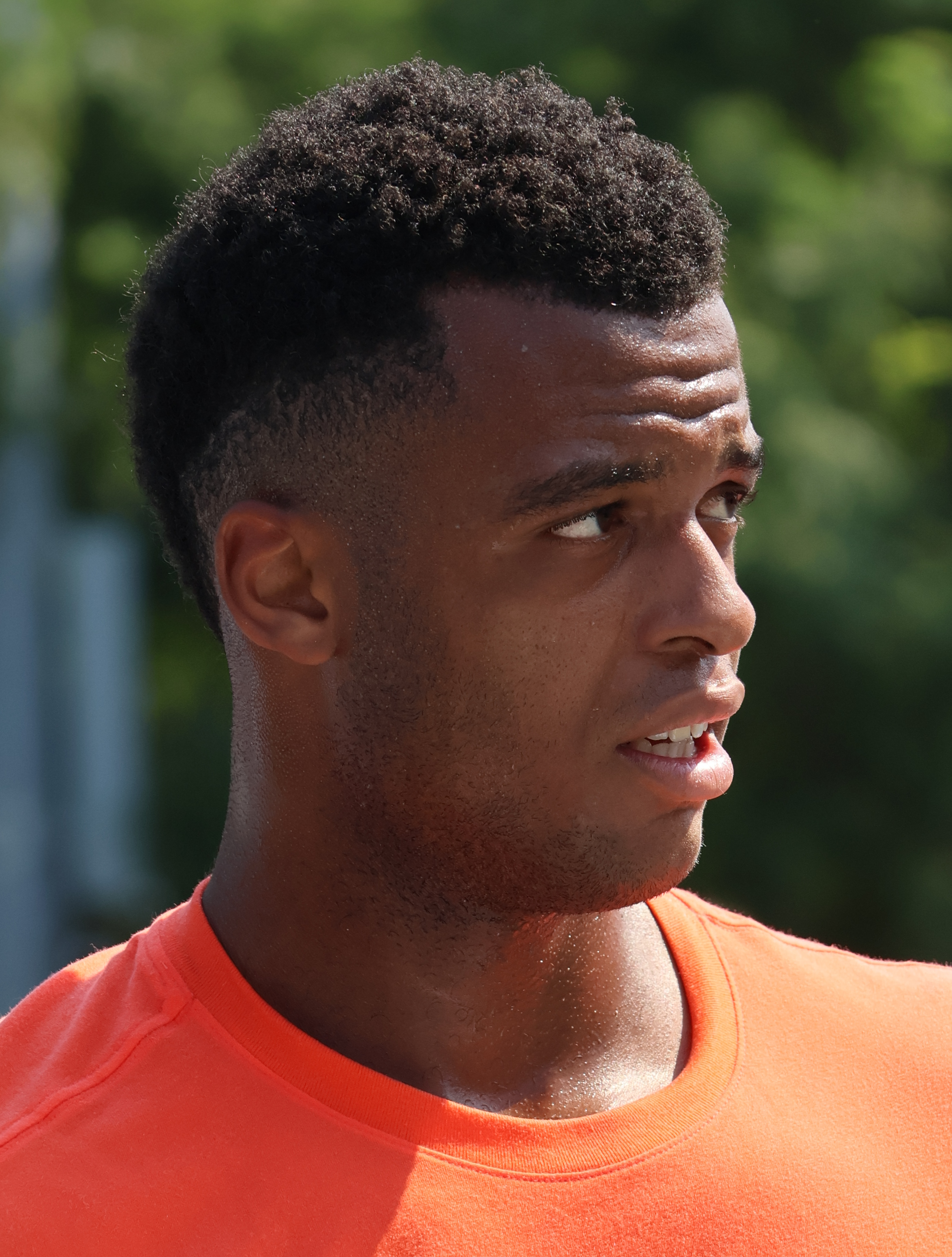
- Mpetshi Perricard in 2024
- Country (sports): France
- Born: 8 July 2003 (age 23) Lyon, France
- Height: 2.01 m (6 ft 7 in)
- Turned pro: 2021
- Plays: Right-handed (one-handed backhand)
- Coach: Greg Rusedski, Philippe Dehaes (2026)
- Prize money: US $3,646,666

Singles
- Career record: 45–60
- Career titles: 2
- Highest ranking: No. 29 (24 February 2025)
- Current ranking: No. 148 (26 October 2026)

Grand Slam singles results
- Australian Open: 1R (2025, 2026)
- French Open: 2R (2025)
- Wimbledon: 4R (2024)
- US Open: 1R (2024, 2025, 2026)

Doubles
- Career record: 7–15
- Career titles: 0
- Highest ranking: No. 204 (14 July 2025)
- Current ranking: No. 1,355 (31 August 2026)

Grand Slam doubles results
- French Open: 1R (2023, 2024, 2025, 2026)
- US Open: 1R (2024, 2025)
- Last updated on: 29 October 2026.

Giovanni Mpetshi Perricard (French pronunciation: [pɛtʃi pɛʁikɑʁ]; born 8 July 2003) is a French professional tennis player. He has a career-high ATP singles ranking of world No. 29, achieved on 24 February 2025 and a doubles ranking of No. 204, reached on 14 July 2025.

One of the most powerful servers in professional tennis, at the 2025 Wimbledon Championships he broke the tournament record with a 153-mile-per-hour (246 km/h) serve, and set the record for the fastest second serve ever with a serve of 147 mph (237 km/h).

Mpetshi Perricard has won two ATP Tour singles titles. He had represented France at the Davis Cup.

== Early life ==
Mpetshi Perricard was born in Lyon, to parents Ghislain 'Guylain' Mpetshi-Kalongo and Sylvie Perricard; his father emigrated from Congo to France in the 1990s.

He started taking tennis lessons in his early childhood.

== Juniors ==
Mpetshi Perricard had good results on the ITF junior circuit. He won the boys' doubles title at the 2021 French Open, with compatriot Arthur Fils. There, he also reached the semifinals in the boys' singles category, losing to Fils.

He reached an ITF junior combined ranking of world No. 4 on 5 July 2021.

== Professional career ==
=== 2023: First Challenger title, top 200 ===
Mpetshi Perricard won his first ATP Challenger singles title at the 2023 León Open, defeating Juan Pablo Ficovich in the finals.

He received a wildcard for the 2023 French Open for his Grand Slam debut, but lost to Major debutant Genaro Alberto Olivieri.

In June, Mpetshi Perricard made his ATP Tour debut at the Rosmalen Open as a qualifier, losing in the first round to Jordan Thompson.

In October, Mpetshi Perricard won his first two matches on the ATP Tour in Antwerp as a qualifier and reached his first ATP quarterfinal, defeating sixth seed Roberto Carballés Baena in the first round, and wildcard and home favorite David Goffin in the second round, but lost in the quarterfinals against the eventual winner of the tournament, Alexander Bublik. As a result he entered the top 200 on 23 October 2023.

=== 2024: First ATP 500 title in Basel, top 30 ===
In January, Mpetshi Pericard participated in his first Australian Open qualifying, but lost in the final round to fellow countryman Hugo Grenier.

In February, Mpetshi Perricard won his first title of the year on the ATP Challenger Tour, his second career title, at the 2024 Lexus Nottingham Challenger, defeating fellow countryman Matteo Martineau in the final. In April, Mpetshi Perricard won back-to-back Challenger titles in Mexico, at the 2024 Morelos Open, defeating Nicolas Mejia in the final, and then at the 2024 GNP Seguros Tennis Open in Acapulco, defeating Adam Walton in the final. As a result, he reached the top 125 on 22 April 2024.

In May, at the 2024 ATP Lyon Open, Mpetshi Perricard won his first title on the ATP Tour as a wildcard with wins over Lorenzo Sonego, Yoshihito Nishioka by walkover, compatriot and qualifier Hugo Gaston, second seed Alexander Bublik and sixth seed Tomás Martín Etcheverry in the final. He became the lowest-ranked titlist in the tournament's history. As a result, he climbed more than 50 spots in the singles rankings to a career-high in the top 70 at world No. 66 on 27 May 2024. He received a wildcard for the 2024 French Open for the second year in a row.

At the beginning of the grass season, he qualified for the 2024 Queen's Club Championships and upset sixth seed Ben Shelton in the first round. As a result he reached the top 60 in the rankings at world No. 59 on 24 June 2024. At the 2024 Wimbledon Championships, Mpetshi Perricard entered the main draw as a lucky loser, having lost to Maxime Janvier in the qualifying rounds. In the first round, he defeated twentieth seed Sebastian Korda in a five-set match with four tiebreaks, producing 51 aces to record his first Major win. He then reached the fourth round by defeating Yoshihito Nishioka in the second round and Emil Ruusuvuori in the third round. He lost in the fourth round to Lorenzo Musetti. Mpetchi Perricard became the first lucky loser to reach the fourth round at the Wimbledon Championships since Dick Norman in 1995.

At the 2024 Swiss Indoors in Basel, Mpetshi Perricard won his first ATP 500 title defeating again Ben Shelton. Ranked No. 50, he became the lowest-ranked champion since the tournament became a tour-level event in 1975. As a result he reached a new career-high ranking of No. 31 on 28 October 2024. On his main draw debut at his home tournament, the 2024 Rolex Paris Masters, where he received a wildcard, he upset 14th seed Frances Tiafoe in three sets. He lost to Karen Khachanov in three sets. As a result, he reached the top 30 on 4 November 2024.

=== 2025: First French Open win ===
He opened the season by reaching the semifinals in Brisbane, but exited in the first round at the Australian Open. He managed to reach the second round at Indian Wells, but subsequently suffered five exits in his debut match.

In May, Mpetshi Perricard won his first Challenger title in more than a year at the Paribas Primrose Bordeaux, defeating Nikoloz Basilashvili in the final. He exits in the second round in Hamburg. Later that month, Mpetshi Perricard won his first match at the French Open by defeating Zizou Bergs in the first round. He lost in the second round to Damir Džumhur.

During the grass season, he exited in the first round in all three tournaments he played, including Wimbledon, where, however, he stood out by taking world number 5, Taylor Fritz, to the fifth set. In the match, he broke the tournament record in the first round with a 153 mph serve, yet still lost the point to Taylor Fritz.

Reaches semifinals at Winston-Salem Open, exits in US Open debut. In Shanghai he reached the quarterfinals of a Masters 1000 for the first time, defeating Taylor Fritz and earning his first victory against a top 10 player. At the European Open he reached the semifinal, obtaining his second victory against a top 10 player, Lorenzo Musetti. He then exited in the first round at the Swiss Indoors, where he was the defending champion, at the Paris Masters and at the Moselle Open.

=== 2026: Out of the top 100 ===
He reached the quarterfinals in both Brisbane and Auckland, but starting from the Australian Open he went out in the first round in four consecutive tournaments, and dropped in the rankings to the point of having to play qualifying to enter the main draw of the ATP 500 in Dubai, where he returned to win a match but went out in the second round against Félix Auger-Aliassime. In February, halfway through this losing streak, he parted ways with his long-time coach Emmanuel Planque. The attempted collaboration with Francisco Roig was cut short in less than a month, when Roig left Mpetshi-Perricard after getting an offer to coach Iga Świątek.

He was again defeated in his debut match in Indian Wells and Miami Open. He manages to enter the draw directly in Monte Carlo Master due to numerous defections, but he also withdraws before taking to the court due to a wrist injury that also prevented him from competing in Madrid. He returned to action in Rome, where he lost in the second round to Lorenzo Musetti.

He tried to defend his Challenger title at Bordeaux, but he was defeated in quarterfinal by Quentin Halys. At Geneva, an ATP 250, he lost in first round against Stefanos Tsitsipas. At Roland Garros, he lost again in first round, against Novak Djokovic.

In preparation for Wimbledon, he took part in the Stuttgart Open, where he reached the quarterfinals only to be eliminated by Alexander Bublik in two tie breaks. He also made it through qualifying at Queen's, only to be defeated in his debut by compatriot Corentin Moutet.

It is the last match he manages to win until the end of October, including the ATP qualifiers and an attempt to relaunch himself in the Challenger circuit, for a total of eight defeats in a row, and becoming one of only seven players to have taken part in all four Slams without winning a match in any of them. His record is 8 wins against 18 losses, 13 of which in the first round, and consequently he drops in the rankings to position no. 148, also detaching himself from the new coaching team.

He finally returns to win a match by qualifying for the Swiss Indoors, but in the first round he is drawn against his compatriot Arthur Fils, second seed and top 10, who eliminates him in two sets.

== Playing style ==
Mpetshi Perricard is one of the most powerful servers in professional tennis, with an average first serve of 135 mph and second serve of 123 mph on average as of December 2024. Although his ball toss is not as high as that of other tennis players, he is able to generate significant power with his height and athleticism.

== Personal life ==
Mpetshi Perricard's family is deeply involved in multiple sports. His father, Ghislain, is a former semi-professional footballer and his mother, Sylvie, is a former volleyball player.

He has two sisters, Ariane and Daphnée, the latter of whom is also a tennis player.

== Performance timeline ==
Key
| W | F | SF | QF | #R | RR | Q# | DNQ | A | NH |

(W) winner; (F) finalist; (SF) semifinalist; (QF) quarterfinalist; (#R) rounds 4, 3, 2, 1; (RR) round-robin stage; (Q#) qualification round; (DNQ) did not qualify; (A) absent; (NH) not held; (SR) strike rate (events won / competed); (W–L) win–loss record.

=== Singles ===
Current through the 2026 Shanghai Masters

| Cnament | 2020 | 2021 | 2022 | 2023 | 2024 | 2025 | 2026 | SR | W–L | Win% |
|---|---|---|---|---|---|---|---|---|---|---|
Grand Slam tournaments
| Australian Open | A | A | A | A | Q3 | 1R | 1R | 0 / 2 | 0–2 | 0% |
| French Open | Q1 | Q1 | A | 1R | 1R | 2R | 1R | 0 / 4 | 1–4 | 20% |
| Wimbledon | NH | A | A | A | 4R | 1R | 1R | 0 / 3 | 3–3 | 50% |
| US Open | A | A | A | Q2 | 1R | 1R | 1R | 0 / 3 | 0–3 | 0% |
| Win–loss | 0–0 | 0–0 | 0–0 | 0–1 | 3–3 | 1–4 | 0–4 | 0 / 12 | 4–12 | 27% |
National representation
| Davis Cup | A | | A | A | A | QF | | 0 / 1 | 1–0 | 100% |
ATP 1000 tournaments
| Indian Wells Open | NH | A | A | A | A | 3R | 1R | 0 / 2 | 2–2 | 50% |
| Miami Open | NH | A | A | A | A | 2R | 1R | 0 / 2 | 1–2 | 33% |
| Monte-Carlo Masters | NH | A | A | A | A | 1R | A | 0 / 1 | 0–1 | 0% |
| Madrid Open | NH | A | A | A | A | 1R | A | 0 / 1 | 0–1 | 0% |
| Italian Open | A | A | A | A | Q1 | 1R | 2R | 0 / 2 | 1–2 | 33% |
| Canadian Open | NH | A | A | A | Q1 | 2R | 1R | 0 / 2 | 1–2 | 33% |
| Cincinnati Open | A | A | A | A | 1R | 1R | Q1 | 0 / 2 | 0–2 | 0% |
| Shanghai Masters | NH | | | A | 1R | 4R | A | 0 / 2 | 2–2 | 50% |
| Paris Masters | A | A | A | Q1 | 2R | 1R | | 0 / 2 | 1–2 | 33% |
| Win–loss | 0–0 | 0–0 | 0–0 | 0–0 | 1–3 | 4–9 | 1–4 | 0 / 16 | 9–16 | 36% |
Career statistics
| | 2020 | 2021 | 2022 | 2023 | 2024 | 2025 | 2026 | Career | | |
| Tournaments | 0 | 0 | 0 | 3 | 14 | 26 | 12 | 55 | | |
| Titles | 0 | 0 | 0 | 0 | 2 | 0 | 0 | 2 | | |
| Finals | 0 | 0 | 0 | 0 | 2 | 0 | 0 | 2 | | |
| Hard win–loss | 0–0 | 0–0 | 0–0 | 2–1 | 8–8 | 16–17 | 5–9 | 1 / 36 | 31–35 | 47% |
| Clay win–loss | 0–0 | 0–0 | 0–0 | 0–1 | 4–1 | 2–6 | 1–3 | 1 / 12 | 7–11 | 39% |
| Grass win–loss | 0–0 | 0–0 | 0–0 | 0–1 | 4–3 | 1–3 | 0–0 | 0 / 7 | 5–7 | 42% |
| Overall win–loss | 0–0 | 0–0 | 0–0 | 2–3 | 16–12 | 19–26 | 6–12 | 43–53 | | |
| Win Percentage | – | – | – | 40% | 57% | 42% | 33% | 45% | | |
| Year-end ranking | 1411 | 597 | 370 | 205 | 31 | 58 | | $3,344,396 | | |

== ATP Tour finals ==
=== Singles: 2 (2 titles) ===
| Legend Grand Slam (–) ATP 1000 (–) ATP 500 (1–0) ATP 250 (1–0) | Finals by surface Hard (1–0) Clay (1–0) Grass (–) | Finals by setting Outdoor (1–0) Indoor (1–0) |

| Result | W–L | Date | Tournament | Tier | Surface | Opponent | Score |
|---|---|---|---|---|---|---|---|
| Win | 1–0 | May 2024 | Lyon Open, France | ATP 250 | Clay | (Argentina) Tomás Martín Etcheverry | 6–4, 1–6, 7–6^{(9–7)} |
| Win | 2–0 | Oct 2024 | Swiss Indoors, Switzerland | ATP 500 | Hard (i) | (United States) Ben Shelton | 6–4, 7–6^{(7–4)} |

== ATP Challenger Tour finals ==
=== Singles: 5 (5 titles) ===
| Legend ATP Challenger Tour (5–0) | Finals by surface Hard (4–0) Clay (1–0) |

| Result | W–L | Date | Tournament | Tier | Surface | Opponent | Score |
|---|---|---|---|---|---|---|---|
| Win | 1–0 | Apr 2023 | León Open, Mexico | Challenger | Hard | (Argentina) Juan Pablo Ficovich | 6–7^{(5–7)}, 7–6^{(8–6)}, 7–6^{(7–3)} |
| Win | 2–0 | Feb 2024 | Nottingham Challenger, UK | Challenger | Hard (i) | (France) Matteo Martineau | 7–6^{(7–2)}, 6–4 |
| Win | 3–0 | Apr 2024 | Morelos Open, Mexico | Challenger | Hard | (Colombia) Nicolás Mejía | 7–5, 7–5 |
| Win | 4–0 | Apr 2024 | GNP Seguros Open, Mexico | Challenger | Hard | (Australia) Adam Walton | 6–3, 6–3 |
| Win | 5–0 | May 2025 | Paribas Primrose Bordeaux, France | Challenger | Clay | (Georgia (country)) Nikoloz Basilashvili | 6–3, 6–7^{(5–7)}, 7–5 |

=== Doubles: 1 (runner-up) ===
| Legend ATP Challenger Tour (0–1) |

| Result | W–L | Date | Tournament | Tier | Surface | Partner | Opponents | Score |
|---|---|---|---|---|---|---|---|---|
| Loss | 0–1 | Mar 2024 | Play In Challenger, France | Challenger | Hard (i) | (France) Titouan Droguet | (United States) Christian Harrison (United Kingdom) Marcus Willis | 7–6^{(8–6)}, 6–3 |

== ITF World Tennis Tour finals ==
=== Singles: 3 (1 title, 2 runner-ups) ===
| Legend ITF WTT (1–2) |

| Result | W–L | Date | Tournament | Tier | Surface | Opponent | Score |
|---|---|---|---|---|---|---|---|
| Win | 1–0 | Jul 2021 | M25 Uriage, France | WTT | Clay | (France) Arthur Fils | 6–3, 4–6, 7–6^{(7–4)} |
| Loss | 1–1 | Jun 2022 | M25 Montauban, France | WTT | Clay | (France) Timo Legout | 3–6, 6–3, 4–6 |
| Loss | 1–2 | Jul 2022 | M25 Uriage, France | WTT | Clay | (France) Ugo Blanchet | 2–6, 3–6 |

=== Doubles: 4 (3 titles, 1 runner-up) ===
| Legend ITF WTT (3–1) | Finals by surface Hard (0–1) Clay (3–0) |

| Result | W–L | Date | Tournament | Tier | Surface | Partner | Opponents | Score |
|---|---|---|---|---|---|---|---|---|
| Loss | 0–1 | Feb 2021 | M15 Monastir, Tunisia | WTT | Hard | (France) Lilian Marmousez | (Austria) Alexander Erler (Tunisia) Skander Mansouri | 2–6, 7–5, [9–11] |
| Win | 1–1 | Apr 2021 | M25 Reus, Spain | WTT | Clay | (France) Arthur Fils | (United States) Hunter Johnson (United States) Yates Johnson | 6–4, 7–5 |
| Win | 2–1 | Jul 2021 | M25 Uriage, France | WTT | Clay | (France) Arthur Fils | (France) Allan Deschamps (France) Maxime Mora | 7–6^{(7–5)}, 6–2 |
| Win | 3–1 | Jul 2022 | M25 Uriage, France | WTT | Clay | (Ivory Coast) Eliakim Coulibaly | (Switzerland) Adrien Burdet (France) Alexandre Reco | 6–3, 7–5 |

== Junior Grand Slam finals ==
=== Doubles: 1 (title) ===
| Result | Year | Tournament | Surface | Partner | Opponents | Score |
|---|---|---|---|---|---|---|
| Win | 2021 | French Open | Clay | (France) Arthur Fils | (Belgium) Martin Katz (Ukraine) German Samofalov | 7–5, 6–2 |

== Wins against Top 10 players ==
- Mpetshi Perricard has a 2–9 (18.18%) record against players who were, at the time the match was played, ranked in the top 10.

| Season | 2025 | 2026 | Total |
|---|---|---|---|
| Wins | 2 | 0 | 2 |

| # | Player | Rk | Event | Surface | Rd | Score | Rk | Ref |
|---|---|---|---|---|---|---|---|---|
2025
| 1. | (United States) Taylor Fritz | 4 | Shanghai Masters, China | Hard | 3R | 6–4, 7–5 | 37 | |
| 2. | (Italy) Lorenzo Musetti | 8 | European Open, Belgium | Hard (i) | QF | 6–4, 7–6^{(10–8)} | 37 | |

- Key: (Rk) first use, opponent rank; (Rd) round; (Rk) 2nd use, player rank; (Ref) reference; (F) final; (SF) semifinal; (QF) quarterfinal; (#R) rounds 4, 3, 2, 1; (RR) round-robin stage; (Q#) qualifying rounds or stages (3), 2, 1.
