= Tigre Hank =

Mexican tennis player (born 1991)

- Full name: Tigre Hank
- Country (sports): Mexico
- Residence: Tijuana, Mexico
- Born: 30 September 1991 (age 34) Tijuana, Mexico
- Height: 1.88 m (6 ft 2 in)
- Plays: Left-handed (two handed-backhand)
- Prize money: $105,375

Singles
- Career record: 1–8 (at ATP Tour level, Grand Slam level, and in Davis Cup)
- Career titles: 4 ITF
- Highest ranking: No. 416 (23 November 2015)

Doubles
- Career record: 2–2 (at ATP Tour level, Grand Slam level, and in Davis Cup)
- Career titles: 1 ITF
- Highest ranking: No. 356 (1 February 2016)

Tigre Hank (born 30 September 1991 in Tijuana) is a Mexican tennis player. Hank has a career high ATP singles ranking of 416, achieved on 23 November 2015. Hank made his ATP main draw debut at the 2014 Abierto Mexicano Telcel, where he lost in the first round to Sam Querrey in three sets. He has represented his country in four separate Davis Cup ties, most recently in 2015 against Chile. His father is businessman Jorge Hank Rhon.
