= León Challenger =

GNP Seguros Tennis Open
- 2024 GNP Seguros Tennis Open

Tournament information
- Event name: GNP Seguros Tennis Open (2024), Mextenis León Open (2023)
- Location: Acapulco - ATP (2024), León - ATP (-2023), WTA
- Venue: Arena GNP Seguros (2024), Club Campestre de León
- Surface: Hard
- Website: Website
ATP Tour
- Category: ATP Challenger Tour 125
- Draw: 32S / 32Q / 16D
- Prize money: $164,000+H (2024)
WTA Tour
- Category: ITF Women's Circuit
- Draw: 32S / 32Q / 16D
- Prize money: $10,000

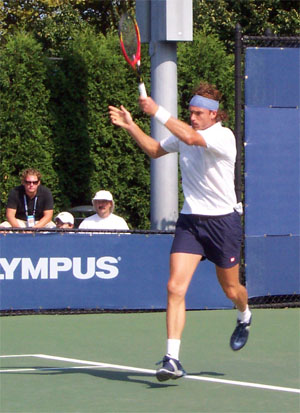
38-year-old Dick Norman from Belgium defeated Marcel Felder to take the 2009 singles title in Mexico City

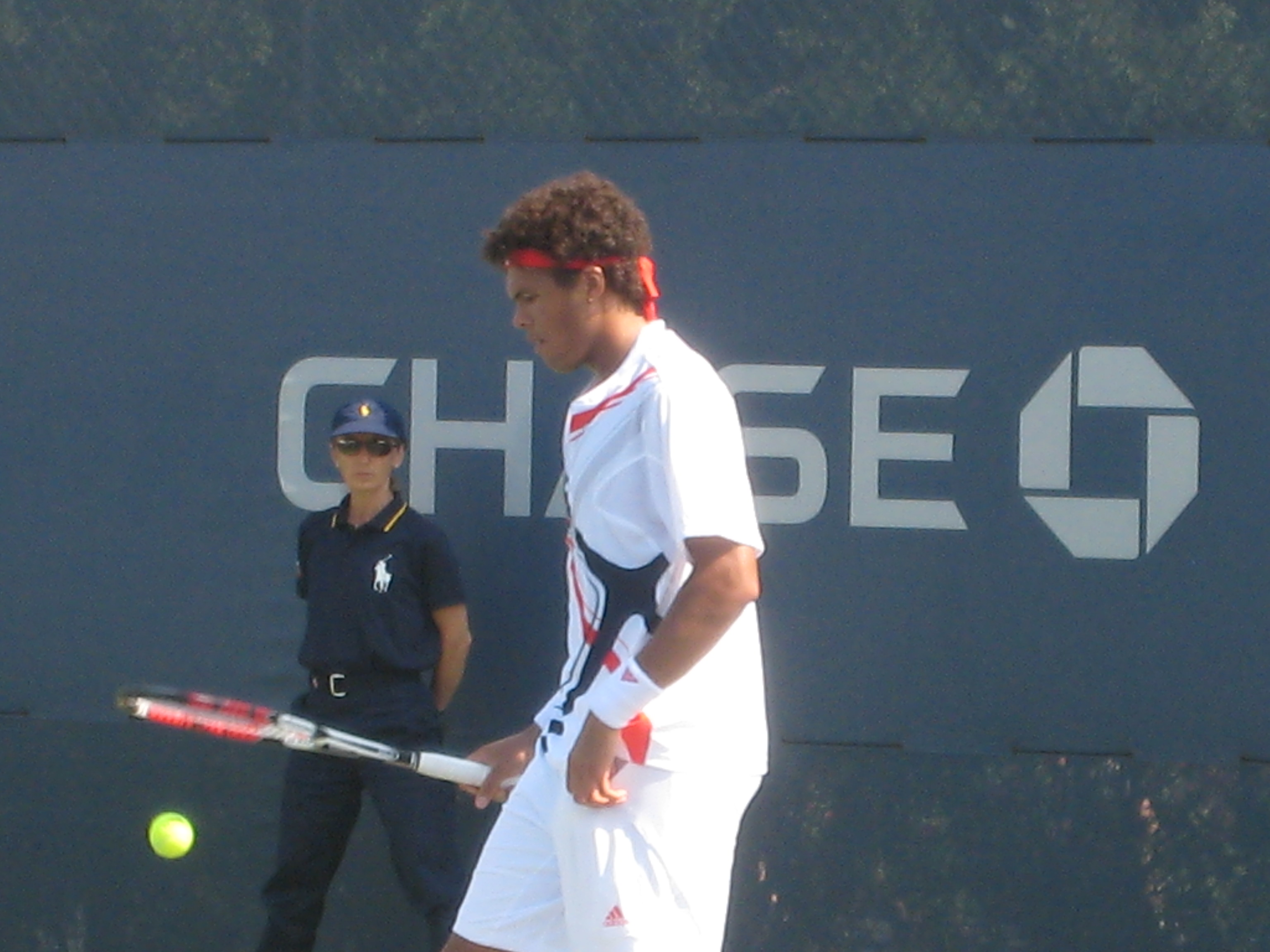
In 2007, eventual French top-tenner Jo-Wilfried Tsonga won his second Challenger singles title in two weeks after Tallahassee

The GNP Seguros Tennis Open (formerly known as Mextenis León Open, Torneo Internacional Challenger León, Challenger Ficrea presentado por ultra, Torneo Internacional AGT and Abierto Internacional Leon) is a professional tennis tournament played on outdoor hardcourts. It is currently part of the ATP Challenger Tour and was part of the ITF Women's Circuit until 2016. It was held annually in León, Guanajuato, Mexico, from 2003 until 2023. In 2024, it was upgraded to a Challenger 125 and moved to Acapulco, Mexico with an increased prize money fund of $164,000.

== Past finals ==
=== Men's singles ===
Year	Champion	Runner-up	Score
2024	(France) Giovanni Mpetshi Perricard	(Australia) Adam Walton	6–3, 6–3
2023	(France) Giovanni Mpetshi Perricard	(Argentina) Juan Pablo Ficovich	6–7^{(5–7)}, 7–6^{(8–6)}, 7–6^{(7–3)}
2020–22	Not held		
2019	(Slovenia) Blaž Rola	(United Kingdom) Liam Broady	6–4, 4–6, 6–3
2018	(United States) Christopher Eubanks	(Australia) John-Patrick Smith	6–4, 3–6, 7–6^{(7–4)}
2017	(Spain) Adrián Menéndez Maceiras	(Ecuador) Roberto Quiroz	6–4, 3–6, 6–3
2016	(Germany) Michael Berrer	(Brazil) João Souza	6–3, 6–2
2015	(United States) Austin Krajicek	(Spain) Adrián Menéndez Maceiras	6–7^{(3–7)}, 7–6^{(7–5)}, 6–4
2014	(United States) Rajeev Ram	(Australia) Sam Groth	6–2, 6–2
2013	(United States) Donald Young	(Chinese Taipei) Jimmy Wang	6–2, 6–2
2012	(United States) Denis Zivkovic	(United States) Rajeev Ram	7–6^{(7–5)}, 6–4
2011	(United States) Bobby Reynolds	(Germany) Andre Begemann	6–3, 6–3
2010	(Mexico) Santiago González	(Poland) Michał Przysiężny	3–6, 6–1, 7–5
2009	(Belgium) Dick Norman	(Uruguay) Marcel Felder	6–4, 6–7^{(6–8)}, 7–5
2008	(Poland) Dawid Olejniczak	(United States) Sam Warburg	6–4, 6–3
2007	(France) Jo-Wilfried Tsonga	(Mexico) Bruno Echagaray	6–4, 2–6, 6–1
2006	(South Africa) Rik de Voest	(United States) Glenn Weiner	7–6^{(7–2)}, 7–6^{(7–2)}
2005	(United States) Amer Delić	(United States) Jeff Morrison	6–4, 3–6, 6–3
2004	(United States) Jeff Morrison	(Chinese Taipei) Lu Yen-hsun	4–6, 7–6^{(7–3)}, 6–2
2003	(Chile) Adrián García	(Mexico) Santiago González	7–5, 6–3

=== Men's doubles ===
Year	Champion	Runner-up	Score
2024	(India) Rithvik Choudary Bollipalli (India) Niki Kaliyanda Poonacha	(United Kingdom) Luke Johnson (Tunisia) Skander Mansouri	7–6^{(7–4)}, 7–5
2023	(Tunisia) Aziz Dougaz (France) Antoine Escoffier	(Austria) Maximilian Neuchrist (Greece) Michail Pervolarakis	7–6^{(7–5)}, 3–6, [10–5]
2020–22	Not held		
2019	(Austria) Lucas Miedler (Austria) Sebastian Ofner	(Australia) Matt Reid (Australia) John-Patrick Smith	4–6, 6–4, [10–6]
2018	(Ecuador) Gonzalo Escobar (Mexico) Manuel Sánchez	(Australia) Bradley Mousley (Australia) John-Patrick Smith	6–4, 6–4
2017	(India) Leander Paes (Canada) Adil Shamasdin	(Switzerland) Luca Margaroli (Brazil) Caio Zampieri	6–1, 6–4
2016	(Mexico) Santiago González (Croatia) Mate Pavić	(Australia) Sam Groth (India) Leander Paes	6–4, 3–6, [13–11]
2015	(United States) Austin Krajicek (United States) Rajeev Ram	(Argentina) Guillermo Durán (Argentina) Horacio Zeballos	6–2, 7–5
2014	(Australia) Samuel Groth (Australia) Chris Guccione	(New Zealand) Marcus Daniell (New Zealand) Artem Sitak	6–4, 6–3
2013	(Australia) Chris Guccione (Australia) Matt Reid	(India) Purav Raja (India) Divij Sharan	6–3, 7–5
2012	(Australia) John Peers (Australia) John-Patrick Smith	(Mexico) César Ramírez (Mexico) Bruno Rodríguez	6–3, 6–3
2011	(United States) Rajeev Ram (United States) Bobby Reynolds	(Germany) Andre Begemann (United Kingdom) Chris Eaton	6–3, 6–2
2010	(Mexico) Santiago González (Canada) Vasek Pospisil	(Australia) Kaden Hensel (Australia) Adam Hubble	3–6, 6–3, [10–8]
2009	(Thailand) Sanchai Ratiwatana (Thailand) Sonchat Ratiwatana	(Dominican Republic) Víctor Estrella (Brazil) João Souza	6–3, 6–3
2008	(United States) Travis Parrott (Slovakia) Filip Polášek	(United States) Brendan Evans (United States) Alex Kuznetsov	6–4, 6–1
2007	(Mexico) Miguel Gallardo Valles (Mexico) Carlos Palencia	(United States) Brendan Evans (United States) Brian Wilson	6–3, 6–3
2006	(Canada) Pierre-Ludovic Duclos (Brazil) André Ghem	(South Africa) Rik de Voest (United States) Glenn Weiner	6–4, 0–6, [10–3]
2005	(United States) Rajeev Ram (United States) Bobby Reynolds	(South Africa) Rik de Voest (Poland) Łukasz Kubot	6–1, 6–7^{(7–9)}, 7–6^{(7–4)}
2004	(Australia) Nathan Healey (Finland) Tuomas Ketola	(Chinese Taipei) Lu Yen-hsun (Thailand) Danai Udomchoke	7–5, 7–6^{(8–6)}
2003	(United States) Huntley Montgomery (United States) Andres Pedroso	(Mexico) Bruno Echagaray (Netherlands Antilles) Jean-Julien Rojer	6–7^{(3–7)}, 7–5, 6–4

=== Women's singles ===
Year	Champion	Runner-up	Score
2016	(Mexico) Renata Zarazúa	(Mexico) Ana Sofía Sánchez	2–6, 6–3, 6–2
2015	(United States) Danielle Lao	(Bulgaria) Aleksandrina Naydenova	3–6, 6–3, 7–5

=== Women's doubles ===
Year	Champion	Runner-up	Score
2016	(South Africa) Chanel Simmonds (Mexico) Renata Zarazúa	(Mexico) Sabastiani León (Mexico) Nazari Urbina	6–0, 6–2
2015	(Brazil) Maria Fernanda Alves (United States) Danielle Lao	(Germany) Kim Grajdek (Japan) Mayo Hibi	5–7, 7–6^{(7–5)}, [10–4]
