= Manuel Sánchez (tennis) =

Mexican tennis player (born 1991)

Manuel Sánchez Montemayor
- Country (sports): Mexico
- Born: 5 January 1991 (age 35) San Luis Potosí
- Plays: Right Handed
- Prize money: $37,834 USD

Singles
- Career record: 0-3 (ATP Tour level, Grand Slam level, and Davis Cup)
- Career titles: 0
- Highest ranking: No. 455 (18 March 2019)
- Current ranking: No. 2,040 (19 January 2026)

Doubles
- Career record: 0-0 (ATP Tour level, Grand Slam level, and Davis Cup)
- Career titles: 0
- Highest ranking: No. 243 (14 May 2018)
- Current ranking: No. 551 (19 January 2026)
- Last updated on: 21 January 2026.

Manuel Sánchez Montemayor (Spanish pronunciation: [maˈnwel ˈsantʃes]; born 5 January 1991) is a tennis player from Mexico. He played in the ATP 500 Mexican Open event and was on the Mexican Davis Cup squad in 2011.

== Sources ==
- Manuel Sánchez at the Association of Tennis Professionals
- Manuel Sánchez at the International Tennis Federation
