= 2014 Jalisco Open – Singles =

Singles
- 2014 Jalisco Open

Final
- Champion: (Luxembourg) Gilles Müller
- Runner-up: (United States) Denis Kudla
- Score: 6–2, 6–2

Events
Singles	Doubles
← 2013 ·	Jalisco Open	· 2015 →

Alex Bogomolov Jr. was the defending champion, but decided not to compete.

Gilles Müller won the title, defeating Denis Kudla in the final, 6–2, 6–2.

== Seeds ==
1. (France) Kenny de Schepper (first round)
2. (Australia) Matthew Ebden (first round)
3. (Russia) Alex Bogomolov Jr. (first round)
4. (Dominican Republic) Víctor Estrella Burgos (first round)
5. (Germany) Dustin Brown (quarterfinals)
6. (Germany) Jan-Lennard Struff (semifinals)
7. (Slovakia) Lukáš Lacko (second round)
8. (Germany) Peter Gojowczyk (first round)

== Draw ==
=== Key ===
- Q = Qualifier
- WC = Wild card
- LL = Lucky loser
- Alt = Alternate
- SE = Special exempt
- PR = Protected ranking
- ITF = ITF entry
- JE = Junior exempt
- w/o = Walkover
- r = Retired
- d = Defaulted
- SR = Special ranking

=== Finals ===
Semifinals
Q	(Luxembourg) Gilles Müller	2	6	6
(United States) Rajeev Ram	6	3	2
(United States) Denis Kudla	7^{7}	5	7^{7}
6	(Germany) Jan-Lennard Struff	6^{4}	7	6^{4}

Final
Q	(Luxembourg) Gilles Müller	6	6
(United States) Denis Kudla	2	2

=== Top half ===
First round
1	(France) K de Schepper	4	0
Q	(Luxembourg) G Müller	6	6
(Canada) P Polansky	7^{7}	7
WC	(Mexico) MÁ Reyes-Varela	6^{5}	5
(Austria) G Melzer	6^{5}	6	6
WC	(Mexico) L Gómez	7^{7}	4	3
(Japan) Y Sugita	3	3
5	(Germany) D Brown	6	6
3	(Russia) A Bogomolov Jr.	4	6	1
(United States) R Ram	6	3	6
WC	(Mexico) Eduardo Rangel	6^{7}	2
Alt	(Japan) H Moriya	7^{9}	6
(Spain) R Ramírez Hidalgo	4	1
SE	(Australia) S Groth	6	6
Q	(Zimbabwe) T Garanganga	6	6
8	(Germany) P Gojowczyk	2	3

Second round
Q	(Luxembourg) G Müller	6	6
(Canada) P Polansky	3	2
(Austria) G Melzer	6	6^{3}	1
5	(Germany) D Brown	4	7^{7}	6
(United States) R Ram	6	6
Alt	(Japan) H Moriya	3	1
SE	(Australia) S Groth	6^{4}	6	6^{2}
Q	(Zimbabwe) T Garanganga	7^{7}	4	7^{7}

Quarterfinals
Q	(Luxembourg) G Müller	7^{7}	2	6
5	(Germany) D Brown	6^{3}	6	3
(United States) R Ram	7^{7}	3	6
Q	(Zimbabwe) T Garanganga	6^{1}	6	2

Semifinals
Q	(Luxembourg) G Müller	2	6	6
(United States) R Ram	6	3	2

=== Bottom half ===
First round
7	(Slovakia) L Lacko	6	6
Alt	(Italy) A Arnaboldi	1	3
(United States) D Kudla	6	6
LL	(Australia) J-P Smith	4	2
(Japan) G Soeda	4	4
SE	(Croatia) A Pavić	6	6
(Japan) T Ito	6	2	6
4	(Dominican Republic) V Estrella Burgos	3	6	3
6	(Germany) J-L Struff	6	6
Q	(Argentina) A Velotti	1	4
(Tunisia) M Jaziri	3	7^{7}	3
(France) P-H Herbert	6	6^{4}	6
Q	(El Salvador) M Arévalo	4
(Romania) M Copil	1^{r}
WC	(Mexico) C Ramírez	6	6
2	(Australia) M Ebden	2	4

Second round
7	(Slovakia) L Lacko	6	5	4
(United States) D Kudla	4	7	6
SE	(Croatia) A Pavić	7^{7}	7^{7}
(Japan) T Ito	6^{3}	6^{4}
6	(Germany) J-L Struff	4	6	7^{7}
(France) P-H Herbert	6	4	6^{5}
Q	(El Salvador) M Arévalo	7	4	6
WC	(Mexico) C Ramírez	5	6	1

Quarterfinals
(United States) D Kudla	6	6
SE	(Croatia) A Pavić	4	4
6	(Germany) J-L Struff	4	6	6
Q	(El Salvador) M Arévalo	6	3	4

Semifinals
(United States) D Kudla	7^{7}	5	7^{7}
6	(Germany) J-L Struff	6^{4}	7	6^{4}
