= 2018 Jalisco Open – Doubles =

Doubles
- 2018 Jalisco Open

Final
- Champions: (El Salvador) Marcelo Arévalo (Mexico) Miguel Ángel Reyes-Varela
- Runners-up: (United Kingdom) Brydan Klein (South Africa) Ruan Roelofse
- Score: 7–6^{(7–3)}, 7–5

Events
| Singles | Doubles |
| ← 2017 · | Jalisco Open |

Santiago González and Artem Sitak were the defending champions but chose not to defend their title.

Marcelo Arévalo and Miguel Ángel Reyes-Varela won the title after defeating Brydan Klein and Ruan Roelofse 7–6^{(7–3)}, 7–5 in the final.

== Seeds ==
1. (El Salvador) Marcelo Arévalo / (Mexico) Miguel Ángel Reyes-Varela (champions)
2. (United States) Austin Krajicek / (United States) Jackson Withrow (first round)
3. (Australia) Bradley Mousley / (Australia) John-Patrick Smith (semifinals)
4. (United Kingdom) Brydan Klein / (South Africa) Ruan Roelofse (final)

== Draw ==
Key

- Q = Qualifier
- WC = Wild card
- LL = Lucky loser
- Alt = Alternate
- ITF = ITF entry
- PR = Protected ranking
- SR = Special ranking
- SE = Special exempt
- JE = Junior exempt
- JR = Junior Accelerator Programme entrant
- CO = College Accelerator Programme entrant
- NG = Next Gen Accelerator Program entrant
- w/o = Walkover
- r = Retired
- d = Defaulted

First round
1 | (El Salvador) M Arévalo (Mexico) MÁ Reyes-Varela | 4 | 6 | [10]
(Peru) S Galdós (Venezuela) R Maytín | 6 | 4 | [6]
(Barbados) D King (New Zealand) R Statham | 3 | 2
PR | (United States) D Novikov (Mexico) C Ramírez | 6 | 6
3 | (Australia) B Mousley (Australia) J-P Smith | 6 | 6
WC | (Mexico) L Gómez (Brazil) J Souza | 0 | 2
(Mexico) H Hach Verdugo (Canada) B Schnur | 6 | 6
(Zimbabwe) B Lock (Brazil) F Romboli | 4 | 3
(Belgium) Christopher Heyman (Germany) M Moraing | 7^{8} | 6^{4} | [4]
(Venezuela) LD Martínez (Canada) F Peliwo | 6^{6} | 7^{7} | [10]
PR | (Argentina) F Agamenone (Colombia) N Barrientos | 6^{3} | 3
4 | (United Kingdom) B Klein (South Africa) R Roelofse | 7^{7} | 6
PR | (Colombia) S Giraldo (Spain) A Menéndez Maceiras | 6 | 7^{7}
WC | (Mexico) G López Villaseñor (Mexico) M Sánchez | 4 | 6^{4}
WC | (Colombia) A Gómez (Mexico) L Patiño | 6^{5} | 7^{9} | [11]
2 | (United States) A Krajicek (United States) J Withrow | 7^{7} | 6^{7} | [9]

Quarterfinals
1 | (El Salvador) M Arévalo (Mexico) MÁ Reyes-Varela | 6^{4} | 6 | [10]
PR | (United States) D Novikov (Mexico) C Ramírez | 7^{7} | 4 | [4]
3 | (Australia) B Mousley (Australia) J-P Smith | 7^{7} | 6^{4} | [10]
(Mexico) H Hach Verdugo (Canada) B Schnur | 6^{5} | 7^{7} | [5]
(Venezuela) LD Martínez (Canada) F Peliwo
4 | (United Kingdom) B Klein (South Africa) R Roelofse | w/o
PR | (Colombia) S Giraldo (Spain) A Menéndez Maceiras | 6 | 6
WC | (Colombia) A Gómez (Mexico) L Patiño | 4 | 3

Semifinals
1 | (El Salvador) M Arévalo (Mexico) MÁ Reyes-Varela | 6 | 7
3 | (Australia) B Mousley (Australia) J-P Smith | 4 | 5
4 | (United Kingdom) B Klein (South Africa) R Roelofse | 6 | 7^{7}
PR | (Colombia) S Giraldo (Spain) A Menéndez Maceiras | 3 | 6^{5}

Final
1 | (El Salvador) M Arévalo (Mexico) MÁ Reyes-Varela | 7^{7} | 7
4 | (United Kingdom) B Klein (South Africa) R Roelofse | 6^{3} | 5
