= 2016 Jalisco Open – Doubles =

Doubles
- 2016 Jalisco Open

Final
- Champion: (Germany) Gero Kretschmer (Germany) Alexander Satschko
- Runner-up: (Mexico) Santiago González (Croatia) Mate Pavić
- Score: 6–3, 4–6, [10–2]

Events
Singles	Doubles
← 2015 ·	Jalisco Open	· 2017 →

Austin Krajicek and Rajeev Ram were the defending champions but chose not to participate.

Gero Kretschmer and Alexander Satschko won the title, defeating Santiago González and Mate Pavić 6–3, 4–6, [10–2] in the final.

== Seeds ==
1. (Mexico) Santiago González / (Croatia) Mate Pavić (final)
2. (New Zealand) Marcus Daniell / (New Zealand) Artem Sitak (semifinals)
3. (Germany) Gero Kretschmer / (Germany) Alexander Satschko (champions)
4. (Canada) Adil Shamasdin / (India) Divij Sharan (first round)

== Draw ==
=== Key ===
- Q = Qualifier
- WC = Wild card
- LL = Lucky loser
- Alt = Alternate
- SE = Special exempt
- PR = Protected ranking
- ITF = ITF entry
- JE = Junior exempt
- w/o = Walkover
- r = Retired
- d = Defaulted
- SR = Special ranking

First round
1	(Mexico) S González (Croatia) M Pavić	6	6
WC	(Mexico) Mauricio Astorga (Mexico) M Sánchez	4	2
(El Salvador) M Arévalo (Peru) S Galdós	6	4	[10]
(South Africa) D O'Brien (Mexico) MA Reyes-Varela	4	6	[7]
4	(Canada) A Shamasdin (India) D Sharan	4	5
(Colombia) N Barrientos (Colombia) A González	6	7
(Bosnia and Herzegovina) D Džumhur (Brazil) F Neis	7^{7}	6
(Argentina) P Cachin (Spain) R Carballés Baena	6^{2}	4
WC	(Mexico) H Hach Verdugo (Mexico) L Patiño	6	7
(Brazil) A Ghem (Spain) A Montañés	3	5
(France) M Bourgue (France) L Pouille	4	4
3	(Germany) G Kretschmer (Germany) A Satschko	6	6
(Uruguay) A Behar (Italy) A Motti	4	2
WC	(Mexico) D Garza (Mexico) T Hank	6	6
(Spain) A Menéndez-Maceiras (United States) A Sarkissian	6	3	[4]
2	(New Zealand) M Daniell (New Zealand) A Sitak	4	6	[10]

Quarterfinals
1	(Mexico) S González (Croatia) M Pavić	6	6
(El Salvador) M Arévalo (Peru) S Galdós	2	4
(Colombia) N Barrientos (Colombia) A González	3	3
(Bosnia and Herzegovina) D Džumhur (Brazil) F Neis	6	6
WC	(Mexico) H Hach Verdugo (Mexico) L Patiño	4	4
3	(Germany) G Kretschmer (Germany) A Satschko	6	6
WC	(Mexico) D Garza (Mexico) T Hank	3	6^{5}
2	(New Zealand) M Daniell (New Zealand) A Sitak	6	7^{7}

Semifinals
1	(Mexico) S González (Croatia) M Pavić	6	6
(Bosnia and Herzegovina) D Džumhur (Brazil) F Neis	3	3
3	(Germany) G Kretschmer (Germany) A Satschko	3	6	[10]
2	(New Zealand) M Daniell (New Zealand) A Sitak	6	3	[5]

Final
1	(Mexico) S González (Croatia) M Pavić	3	6	[2]
3	(Germany) G Kretschmer (Germany) A Satschko	6	4	[10]
