= Denis Shapovalov career statistics =

Canadian professional tennis player

Career finals
Discipline	Type	Won	Lost	Total
Singles	Grand Slam	–	–	–
Singles	ATP Finals	–	–	–
Singles	ATP 1000	–	1	1
Singles	ATP 500	1	1	2
Singles	ATP 250	3	3	6
Singles	Olympics	–	–	–
Singles	Total	4	5	9
Doubles	Grand Slam	–	–	–
Doubles	ATP Finals	–	–	–
Doubles	ATP 1000	–	–	–
Doubles	ATP 500	–	–	–
Doubles	ATP 250	–	2	2
Doubles	Olympics	–	–	–
Doubles	Total	–	2	2

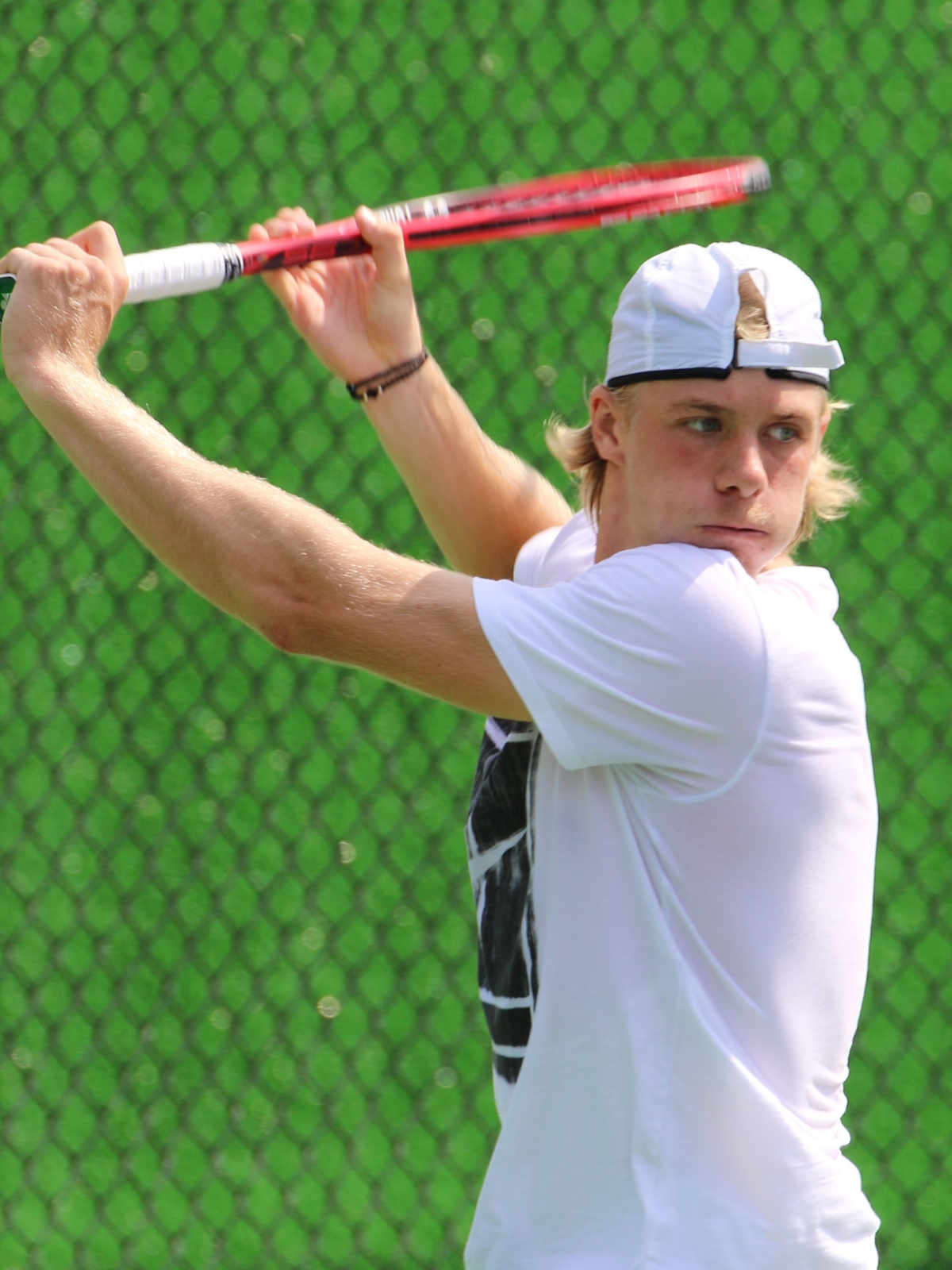
Shapovalov at the 2018 Citi Open

Denis Shapovalov is a Canadian professional tennis player who has been ranked as high as world No. 10 in singles and world No. 44 in doubles by the Association of Tennis Professionals (ATP). He has won four singles titles on the ATP Tour in his career to date.

During his junior career, Shapovalov reached a peak ranking of No. 2 in the world in July 2016 after winning his first and only junior Grand Slam singles title at the 2016 Wimbledon Championships. He turned professional the following year and won two titles on the ATP Challenger Tour and one on the International Tennis Federation (ITF) Men's World Tennis Tour before he earned a wild card to the 2017 Canadian Open later that summer. There, the world No. 134 Shapovalov defeated top seed and world No. 2 Rafael Nadal in a third-round upset win, and he reached the semifinals before losing to eventual champion Alexander Zverev, a feat that earned him a top 100 debut in the ATP rankings. At the age of 18, he became the youngest player ever to reach the semifinals of an ATP Masters 1000 tournament. The next month, Shapovalov continued his success by qualifying for his second career Grand Slam main draw debut at the 2017 US Open and reaching the fourth round, which made him the youngest player to reach the fourth round of the US Open since Michael Chang in 1989. By the end of the year, he had soared 199 ranking spots to close his breakout 2017 as the world No. 51.

Shapovalov reached his first ATP Tour final at the 2019 Stockholm Open, during which he beat Filip Krajinović to clinch his first career ATP title. That same year, together with compatriots Félix Auger-Aliassime and Vasek Pospisil, he led Canada to its first-ever Davis Cup final, where they were runners-up to Spain. In 2020, he reached his career-high ranking of No. 10 following a Grand Slam quarterfinal debut at the 2020 US Open and a semifinal debut at the 2020 Italian Open, after which he finished the year with his highest year-end ranking of No. 12. He has reached a Grand Slam semifinal in singles once, at the 2021 Wimbledon Championships, and despite primarily playing singles, he has also made a Grand Slam quarterfinal in doubles with longtime doubles partner Rohan Bopanna at the 2020 US Open. In 2022 Davis Cup, Shapovalov teamed up with Félix Auger-Aliassime and Vasek Pospisil to give Canada its first-ever Davis Cup final win.

== Performance timelines ==
Key
W	F	SF	QF	#R	RR	Q#	P#	DNQ	A	Z#	PO	G	S	B	NMS	NTI	P	NH

(W) winner; (F) finalist; (SF) semifinalist; (QF) quarterfinalist; (#R) rounds 4, 3, 2, 1; (RR) round-robin stage; (Q#) qualification round; (P#) preliminary round; (DNQ) did not qualify; (A) absent; (Z#) Davis/Fed Cup Zonal Group (with number indication) or (PO) play-off; (G) gold, (S) silver or (B) bronze Olympic/Paralympic medal; (NMS) not a Masters tournament; (NTI) not a Tier I tournament; (P) postponed; (NH) not held; (SR) strike rate (events won / competed); (W–L) win–loss record.
To avoid confusion and double counting, these charts are updated at the conclusion of a tournament or when the player's participation has ended.

=== Singles ===
Tournament	2016	2017	2018	2019	2020	2021	2022	2023	2024	2025	2026	SR	W–L	Win %
Grand Slam tournaments
Australian Open	A	A	2R	3R	1R	3R	QF	3R	1R	2R	2R	0 / 9	13–9	59%
French Open	A	Q1	2R	1R	2R	A	1R	3R	3R	2R	1R	0 / 8	7–8	47%
Wimbledon	A	1R	2R	1R	NH	SF	2R	4R	3R	1R	1R	0 / 9	11–9	55%
US Open	A	4R	3R	3R	QF	3R	3R	A	1R	3R	3R	0 / 9	19–9	68%
Win–loss	0–0	3–2	5–4	4–4	5–3	8–3	7–4	7–3	4–4	4–4	3–4	0 / 35	50–35	59%
Year-end Championships
ATP Finals	did not qualify				Alt	did not qualify						0 / 0	0–0	–
National representation
Davis Cup	PO	1R	1R	F	NH	A	W	A	QF	A		1 / 5	14–8	64%
ATP 1000 tournaments
Indian Wells Open	A	A	2R	4R	NH	3R	3R	2R	2R	3R	3R	0 / 8	9–8	53%
Miami Open	A	A	4R	SF	NH	3R	2R	3R	3R	3R	1R	0 / 8	12–8	60%
Monte-Carlo Masters	A	A	1R	1R	NH	A	A	A	A	1R	1R	0 / 4	0–4	0%
Madrid Open	A	A	SF	1R	NH	2R	2R	2R	3R	3R	2R	0 / 8	9–8	53%
Italian Open	A	A	3R	2R	SF	3R	QF	A	1R	2R	1R	0 / 8	12–8	60%
Canadian Open	2R	SF	3R	2R	NH	2R	1R	A	1R	2R	1R	0 / 9	8–9	47%
Cincinnati Open	A	A	3R	2R	2R	2R	3R	A	A	2R	2R	0 / 7	7–7	50%
Shanghai Masters	A	1R	1R	2R	Not Held			A	2R	3R	A	0 / 5	3–5	38%
Paris Masters	A	1R	1R	F	A	A	2R	A	A	1R	1R	0 / 6	5–6	45%
Win–loss	1–1	4–3	14–9	14–9	5–2	5–6	7–6	1–3	6–6	4–9	3–8	0 / 63	65–63	51%
Career statistics
	2016	2017	2018	2019	2020	2021	2022	2023	2024	2025	2026	SR	W–L	Win %
Tournaments	2	10	27	26	13	20	23	13	23	24	20	201		
Titles	0	0	0	1	0	0	0	0	1	2	0	4		
Finals	0	0	0	2	0	2	2	0	1	2	1	10		
Hardcourt win–loss	2–2	11–12	25–18	34–19	12–13	15–14	29–18	6–7	18–15	23–14	18–12	4 / 131	193–144	57%
Clay win–loss	0–0	0–0	8–6	4–6	5–2	7–6	4–4	3–3	5–6	2–5	2–5	0 / 43	40–43	48%
Grass win–loss	0–0	1–2	2–4	0–3	0–0	8–3	1–4	4–3	3–2	1–3	1–3	0 / 27	21–27	44%
Overall win–loss	2–2	12–14	35–28	38–28	17–15	30–23	34–26	13–13	26–23	26–22	21–20	4 / 201	254–214	54%
Win %	50%	46%	56%	58%	53%	57%	57%	50%	53%	54%	51%	54%		
Year-end ranking	250	51	27	15	12	14	18	109	56	23		$15,875,500		

=== Doubles ===
Tournament	2016	2017	2018	2019	2020	2021	2022	2023	2024	2025	2026	SR	W–L	Win %
Grand Slam tournaments
Australian Open	A	A	A	A	A	2R	A	A	A	A	A	0 / 1	1–1	50%
French Open	A	A	A	A	1R	A	A	A	A	A	A	0 / 1	0–1	0%
Wimbledon	A	A	A	A	NH	A	A	A	A	A	A	0 / 0	0–0	–
US Open	A	A	A	3R	QF	A	A	A	1R	A	A	0 / 3	3–3	50%
Win–loss	0–0	0–0	0–0	1–1	2–2	1–1	0–0	0–0	0–1	0–0	0–0	0 / 5	4–5	44%
National representation
Davis Cup	PO	1R	1R	F	NH	A	W	A	QF	A		1 / 5	4–3	57%
ATP 1000 tournaments
Indian Wells Open	A	A	A	2R	NH	QF	2R	QF	A	A	A	0 / 4	5–4	56%
Miami Open	A	A	2R	QF	NH	A	QF	A	A	A	A	0 / 3	5–3	63%
Monte-Carlo Masters	A	A	A	A	NH	A	A	A	A	A	A	0 / 0	0–0	–
Madrid Open	A	A	A	A	NH	QF	1R	QF	1R	A	A	0 / 4	4–4	50%
Italian Open	A	A	1R	2R	QF	1R	A	A	A	A	A	0 / 4	3–4	43%
Canadian Open	1R	A	1R	SF	NH	A	1R	A	1R	A	A	0 / 5	3–5	38%
Cincinnati Open	A	A	A	2R	1R	A	QF	A	A	A	A	0 / 3	3–3	50%
Shanghai Masters	A	A	A	2R	NH			A	A	A	A	0 / 1	1–1	50%
Paris Masters	A	A	A	QF	A	A	A	A	A	A		0 / 1	2–1	67%
Win–loss	0–1	0–0	1–3	10–7	2–2	4–3	6–5	3–2	0–2	0–0	0–0	0 / 25	26–25	51%
Career statistics
	2016	2017	2018	2019	2020	2021	2022	2023	2024	2025	2026	2026	SR	W–L
Tournaments	1	0	10	13	7	5	8	3	3	1	2	53		
Titles	0	0	0	0	0	0	0	0	0	0	0	0		
Finals	0	0	0	1	0	0	1	0	0	0	0	2		
Hardcourt win–loss	0–1	0–0	2–5	15–13	7–5	6–5	12–8	2–1	1–3	0–0	0–1	0 / 36	45–42	52%
Clay win–loss	0–0	0–0	1–2	1–2	2–2	2–2	0–1	2–1	0–1	0–0	0–0	0 / 10	8–11	42%
Grass win–loss	0–0	0–0	0–2	3–1	0–0	0–0	4–2	0–0	0–0	2–1	1–0	0 / 7	10–6	63%
Overall win–loss	0–1	0–0	3–9	19–16	9–7	8–7	16–11	4–2	1–4	2–1	1–1	0 / 53	63–59	52%
Win %	0%	–	25%	54%	56%	53%	59%	67%	20%	67%	50%	52%		
Year-end ranking	557	756	300	50	49	83	75	191	339	353				

== Significant finals ==
=== ATP 1000 tournaments ===
==== Singles: 1 (runner-up) ====
Result	Year	Tournament	Surface	Opponent	Score
Loss	2019	Paris Masters, France	Hard (i)	(Serbia) Novak Djokovic	3–6, 4–6

== ATP Tour finals ==
=== Singles: 10 (4 titles, 6 runner-ups) ===
Legend Grand Slam (0–0) ATP 1000 (0–1) ATP 500 (1–1) ATP 250 (3–4)	Finals by surface Hard (4–5) Clay (0–1) Grass (0–0)	Finals by setting Outdoor (1–3) Indoor (3–3)

Result	W–L	Date	Tournament	Tier	Surface	Opponent	Score
Win	1–0	Oct 2019	Stockholm Open, Sweden	ATP 250	Hard (i)	(Serbia) Filip Krajinović	6–4, 6–4
Loss	1–1	Nov 2019	Paris Masters, France	ATP 1000	Hard (i)	(Serbia) Novak Djokovic	3–6, 4–6
Loss	1–2	May 2021	Geneva Open, Switzerland	ATP 250	Clay	(Norway) Casper Ruud	6–7^{(6–8)}, 4–6
Loss	1–3	Nov 2021	Stockholm Open, Sweden	ATP 250	Hard (i)	(United States) Tommy Paul	4–6, 6–2, 4–6
Loss	1–4	Oct 2022	Korea Open, South Korea	ATP 250	Hard	(Japan) Yoshihito Nishioka	4–6, 6–7^{(5–7)}
Loss	1–5	Oct 2022	Vienna Open, Austria	ATP 500	Hard (i)	Daniil Medvedev	6–4, 3–6, 2–6
Win	2–5	Nov 2024	Belgrade Open, Serbia	ATP 250	Hard (i)	(Serbia) Hamad Medjedovic	6–4, 6–4
Win	3–5	Feb 2025	Dallas Open, United States	ATP 500	Hard (i)	(Norway) Casper Ruud	7–6^{(7–5)}, 6–3
Win	4–5	Jul 2025	Los Cabos Open, Mexico	ATP 250	Hard	(United States) Aleksandar Kovacevic	6–4, 6–2
Loss	4–6	Aug 2026	Los Cabos Open, Mexico	ATP 250	Hard	(France) Arthur Géa	3–6, 4–6

=== Doubles: 2 (2 runner-ups) ===
Legend Grand Slam (0–0) ATP 1000 (0–0) ATP 500 (0–0) ATP 250 (0–2)	Finals by surface Hard (0–1) Clay (0–0) Grass (0–1)	Finals by setting Outdoor (0–2) Indoor (0–0)

Result	W–L	Date	Tournament	Tier	Surface	Partner	Opponents	Score
Loss	0–1	Jun 2019	Stuttgart Open, Germany	ATP 250	Grass	(India) Rohan Bopanna	(Australia) John Peers (Brazil) Bruno Soares	5–7, 3–6
Loss	0–2	Feb 2022	Qatar Open, Qatar	ATP 250	Hard	(India) Rohan Bopanna	(Netherlands) Wesley Koolhof (United Kingdom) Neal Skupski	6–7^{(4–7)}, 1–6

== ATP Challenger Tour finals ==
=== Singles: 3 (2 titles, 1 runner-up) ===
Result	W–L	Date	Tournament	Category	Surface	Opponent	Score
Win	1–0	Mar 2017	Challenger de Drummondville, Canada	Challenger	Hard (i)	(Belgium) Ruben Bemelmans	6–3, 6–2
Loss	1–1	Mar 2017	Jalisco Open, Mexico	Challenger	Hard	(Bosnia and Herzegovina) Mirza Bašić	4–6, 4–6
Win	2–1	Jul 2017	Challenger de Gatineau, Canada	Challenger	Hard	(Canada) Peter Polansky	6–1, 3–6, 6–3

== ITF Futures finals ==
=== Singles: 4 (4 titles) ===
Legend ITF Futures (4–0)	Finals by surface Hard (2–0) Clay (2–0)

Result	W–L	Date	Tournament	Category	Surface	Opponent	Score
Win	1–0	Jan 2016	F5 Weston, US	Futures	Clay	(Brazil) Pedro Sakamoto	7–6^{(7–2)}, 6–3
Win	2–0	Apr 2016	F12 Memphis, US	Futures	Hard	(United States) Tennys Sandgren	7–6^{(7–4)}, 7–6^{(7–4)}
Win	3–0	Apr 2016	F14 Orange Park, US	Futures	Clay	(Serbia) Miomir Kecmanović	7–5, 2–6, 7–6^{(8–6)}
Win	4–0	Mar 2017	F1 Gatineau, Canada	Futures	Hard (i)	(France) Gleb Sakharov	6–2, 6–4

=== Doubles: 3 (2 titles, 1 runner-up) ===
Result	W–L	Date	Tournament	Category	Surface	Partner	Opponents	Score
Win	1–0	Nov 2015	F33 Pensacola, US	Futures	Clay	(Hungary) Péter Nagy	(United States) Christopher Ephron (Brazil) Bruno Savi	6–3, 6–2
Loss	1–1	Jan 2016	F4 Sunrise, US	Futures	Clay	(Hungary) Péter Nagy	(Sweden) Isak Arvidsson (Japan) Kaichi Uchida	4–6, 4–6
Win	2–1	Apr 2016	F14 Orange Park, US	Futures	Clay	(Hungary) Péter Nagy	(United States) Dennis Nevolo (Philippines) Ruben Gonzales	6–2, 6–3

== ITF Junior Circuit ==
=== Singles: 6 (5 titles, 1 runner-up) ===
Legend
Category GA (1–0)
Category G1 (1–1)
Category G2 (0–0)
Category G3 (0–0)
Category G4 (1–0)
Category G5 (2–0)

Result	W–L	Date	Tournament	Category	Surface	Opponent	Score
Win	1–0	Oct 2013	ACE Tennis U18 Canadian World Ranking Event 2, Canada	Category G5	Hard	(Japan) Kentaro Mizushima	6–4, 7–5
Win	2–0	Apr 2014	All Canadian Junior Championships, Canada	Category G5	Hard	(Canada) Benjamin Sigouin	4–6, 6–1, 6–4
Win	3–0	Jun 2014	Copa Cariari, Costa Rica	Category G4	Hard	(Canada) Benjamin Sigouin	6–2, 6–2
Loss	3–1	Aug 2015	Prince George's County International, United States	Category G1	Hard	(Canada) Félix Auger-Aliassime	2–6, 6–7^{(6–8)}
Win	4–1	Jun 2016	Nike Junior International Roehampton, United Kingdom	Category G1	Grass	(Japan) Yosuke Watanuki	6–1, 6–4
Win	5–1	Jun 2016	Wimbledon, United Kingdom	Category GA	Grass	(Australia) Alex de Minaur	4–6, 6–1, 6–3

=== Doubles: 3 (2 titles, 1 runner-up) ===
Legend
Category GA (1–1)
Category G1 (0–0)
Category G2 (0–0)
Category G3 (0–0)
Category G4 (1–0)
Category G5 (0–0)

Result	W–L	Date	Tournament	Category	Surface	Partner	Opponents	Score
Win	1–0	Jun 2014	Copa Cariari, Costa Rica	Category G4	Hard	(Canada) Alexis Galarneau	(Canada) Jack Mingjie Lin (Canada) Benjamin Sigouin	6–0, 1–6, [10–4]
Win	2–0	Sep 2015	US Open, United States	Category GA	Hard	(Canada) Félix Auger-Aliassime	(United States) Riley Smith (United States) Brandon Holt	7–5, 7–6^{(7–3)}
Loss	2–1	Jun 2016	Wimbledon, United Kingdom	Category GA	Grass	(Canada) Félix Auger-Aliassime	(Estonia) Kenneth Raisma (Greece) Stefanos Tsitsipas	6–4, 4–6, 2–6

== Career Grand Slam tournament statistics ==
=== Career Grand Slam tournament seedings ===
Year	Australian Open	French Open	Wimbledon	US Open
2017	did not play	qualifier	not seeded	qualifier
2018	not seeded	24th	26th	28th
2019	25th	20th	29th	not seeded
2020	13th	9th	tournament cancelled*	12th
2021	11th	did not play	10th	7th
2022	14th	14th	13th	19th
2023	20th	26th	26th	did not play
2024	protected ranking	protected ranking	protected ranking	protected ranking
2025	not seeded	27th	27th	27th
2026	21st	not seeded	not seeded	not seeded

* Due to the COVID-19 pandemic, the 2020 Wimbledon Championships of the tournament was cancelled.

=== Best Grand Slam results details ===
Australian Open
2022 Australian Open (14th seed)
Round	Opponent	Rank	Score
1R	(Serbia) Laslo Đere	51	7–6^{(7–3)}, 6–4, 3–6, 7–6^{(7–3)}
2R	(South Korea) Kwon Soon-woo	54	7–6^{(8–6)}, 6–7^{(3–7)}, 6–7^{(6–8)}, 7–5, 6–2
3R	(United States) Reilly Opelka (23)	29	7–6^{(7–4)}, 4–6, 6–3, 6–4
4R	(Germany) Alexander Zverev (3)	3	6–3, 7–6^{(7–5)}, 6–3
QF	(Spain) Rafael Nadal (6)	6	3–6, 4–6, 6–4, 6–3, 3–6

French Open
2023 French Open (26th seed)
Round	Opponent	Rank	Score
1R	(United States) Brandon Nakashima	45	6–4, 7–5, 4–6, 3–6, 6–3
2R	(Italy) Matteo Arnaldi	106	6–2, 3–6, 6–3, 6–3
3R	(Spain) Carlos Alcaraz (1)	1	1–6, 4–6, 2–6
2024 French Open (protected ranking)
Round	Opponent	Rank	Score
1R	(France) Luca Van Assche	103	6–3, 6–4, 6–4
2R	(United States) Frances Tiafoe (25)	26	6–7^{(4–7)}, 6–4, 6–2, 6–4
3R	(Poland) Hubert Hurkacz (8)	8	3–6, 6–7^{(0–7)}, 6–4, 1–6

Wimbledon Championships
2021 Wimbledon (10th seed)
Round	Opponent	Rank	Score
1R	(Germany) Philipp Kohlschreiber	115	6–4, 4–6, 6–3, 5–7, 6–4
2R	(Spain) Pablo Andújar	70	Walkover
3R	(United Kingdom) Andy Murray	118	6–4, 6–2, 6–2
4R	(Spain) Roberto Bautista Agut (8)	10	6–1, 6–3, 7–5
QF	(Russia) Karen Khachanov (25)	29	6–4, 3–6, 5–7, 6–1, 6–4
SF	(Serbia) Novak Djokovic (1)	1	6–7^{(3–7)}, 5–7, 5–7

US Open
2020 US Open (12th seed)
Round	Opponent	Rank	Score
1R	(United States) Sebastian Korda	205	6–4, 4–6, 6–3, 6–2
2R	(South Korea) Kwon Soon-woo	73	6–7^{(5–7)}, 6–4, 6–4, 6–2
3R	(United States) Taylor Fritz (19)	25	3–6, 6–3, 4–6, 7–6^{(7–5)}, 6–2
4R	(Belgium) David Goffin (7)	10	6–7^{(0–7)}, 6–3, 6–4, 6–3
QF	(Spain) Pablo Carreño Busta (20)	27	6–3, 6–7^{(5–7)}, 6–7^{(4–7)}, 6–0, 3–6

== Wins over top-10 players ==
- Shapovalov has a 14–37 record against players who were, at the time the match was played, ranked in the top 10.

Season	2017	2018	2019	2020	2021	2022	2023	2024	2025	2026	Total
Wins	1	0	3	3	1	3	0	0	3	0	14

#	Opponent	Rk	Event	Surface	Rd	Score	Rk	Ref
2017
1.	(Spain) Rafael Nadal	2	Canadian Open, Canada	Hard	3R	3–6, 6–4, 7–6^{(7–4)}	143	
2019
2.	(Greece) Stefanos Tsitsipas	10	Miami Open, United States	Hard	4R	4–6, 6–3, 7–6^{(7–3)}	23	
3.	(Germany) Alexander Zverev	6	Paris Masters, France	Hard (i)	3R	6–2, 5–7, 6–2	28	
4.	(Italy) Matteo Berrettini	8	Davis Cup Finals, Spain	Hard (i)	RR	7–6^{(7–5)}, 6–7^{(3–7)}, 7–6^{(7–5)}	15	
2020
5.	(Greece) Stefanos Tsitsipas	6	ATP Cup, Australia	Hard	RR	7–6^{(8–6)}, 7–6^{(7–4)}	15	
6.	(Germany) Alexander Zverev	7	ATP Cup, Australia	Hard	RR	6–2, 6–2	14	
7.	(Belgium) David Goffin	10	US Open, United States	Hard	4R	6–7^{(0–7)}, 6–3, 6–4, 6–3	17	
2021
8.	(Spain) Roberto Bautista Agut	10	Wimbledon, United Kingdom	Grass	4R	6–1, 6–3, 7–5	12	
2022
9.	(Germany) Alexander Zverev	3	Australian Open, Australia	Hard	4R	6–3, 7–6^{(7–5)}, 6–3	14	
10.	(Spain) Rafael Nadal	4	Italian Open, Italy	Clay	3R	1–6, 7–5, 6–2	16	
11.	(United States) Taylor Fritz	10	Vienna Open, Austria	Hard (i)	2R	6–1, 4–6, 6–3	19	
2025
12.	(United States) Taylor Fritz	4	Dallas Open, United States	Hard (i)	2R	2–6, 6–3, 7–6^{(7–2)}	54	
13.	(United States) Tommy Paul	9	Dallas Open, United States	Hard (i)	SF	7–5, 6–3	54	
14.	(Norway) Casper Ruud	5	Dallas Open, United States	Hard (i)	F	7–6^{(7–5)}, 6–3	54	

- Key: (Rk) first use, opponent rank; (Rd) round; (Rk) 2nd use, player rank; (Ref) reference; (F) final; (SF) semifinal; (QF) quarterfinal; (#R) rounds 4, 3, 2, 1; (RR) round-robin stage; (Q#) qualifying rounds or stages (3), 2, 1.

:* As of 9 February 2025

== National and international representation ==
=== ATP Cup ===
==== Titles: 1 (1 victory) ====
Edition	Team	Rd	Score
2022	Félix Auger-Aliassime; Steven Diez; Brayden Schnur; Denis Shapovalov	RR	Canada 0–3 United States
2022	Félix Auger-Aliassime; Steven Diez; Brayden Schnur; Denis Shapovalov	RR	Canada 2–1 Great Britain
2022	Félix Auger-Aliassime; Steven Diez; Brayden Schnur; Denis Shapovalov	RR	Germany 1–2 Canada
2022	Félix Auger-Aliassime; Steven Diez; Brayden Schnur; Denis Shapovalov	SF	Canada 2–1 Russia
2022	Félix Auger-Aliassime; Steven Diez; Brayden Schnur; Denis Shapovalov	F	Spain 0–2 Canada

==== Participation: 16 (9 wins, 7 losses) ====
Rd	Date	Opponent nation	Score	Venue	Surface	Match	Opponent player(s)	W–L	Rubber score
RR	Jan 2020	Greece	3–0	Brisbane	Hard (i)	Singles	Stefanos Tsitsipas	Win	7–6^{(8–6)}, 7–6^{(7–4)}
RR	Jan 2020	Greece	3–0	Brisbane	Hard (i)	Doubles (w/ F Auger-Aliassime)	Michail Pervolarakis; Petros Tsitsipas	Win	6–2, 6–3
RR	Jan 2020	Australia	0–3	Brisbane	Hard (i)	Singles	Alex de Minaur	Loss	7–6^{(8–6)}, 4–6, 2–6
RR	Jan 2020	Germany	2–1	Brisbane	Hard (i)	Singles	Alexander Zverev	Win	6–2, 6–2
RR	Jan 2020	Germany	2–1	Brisbane	Hard (i)	Doubles (w/ F Auger-Aliassime)	Kevin Krawietz; Andreas Mies	Win	6–3, 7–6^{(7–4)}
Quarterfinals	Jan 2020	Serbia	0–3	Sydney	Hard (i)	Singles	Novak Djokovic	Loss	6–4, 1–6, 6–7^{(4–7)}
RR	Feb 2021	Serbia	1–2	Melbourne	Hard (i)	Singles	Novak Djokovic	Loss	5–7, 5–7
RR	Feb 2021	Serbia	1–2	Melbourne	Hard (i)	Doubles (w/ M Raonic)	Novak Djokovic; Filip Krajinović	Loss	5–7, 6–7^{(4–7)}
RR	Feb 2021	Germany	1–2	Melbourne	Hard (i)	Singles	Alexander Zverev	Loss	7–6^{(7–5)}, 3–6, 6–7^{(4–7)}
RR	Jan 2022	United States	0–3	Sydney	Hard (i)	Doubles (w/ F Auger-Aliassime)	Taylor Fritz; John Isner	Loss	4–6, 4–6
RR	Jan 2022	Great Britain	2–1	Sydney	Hard (i)	Singles	Dan Evans	Loss	4–6, 4–6
RR	Jan 2022	Great Britain	2–1	Sydney	Hard (i)	Doubles (w/ F Auger-Aliassime)	Jamie Murray; Joe Salisbury	Win	6–4, 6–1
RR	Jan 2022	Germany	2–1	Sydney	Hard (i)	Singles	Jan-Lennard Struff	Win	7–6^{(7–5)}, 4–6, 6–3
Semifinals	Jan 2022	Russia	2–1	Sydney	Hard (i)	Singles	Roman Safiullin	Win	6–4, 5–7, 6–4
Semifinals	Jan 2022	Russia	2–1	Sydney	Hard (i)	Doubles (w/ F Auger-Aliassime)	Daniil Medvedev; Roman Safiullin	Win	4–6, 7–5, [10–7]
Final	Jan 2022	Spain	2–0	Sydney	Hard (i)	Singles	Pablo Carreño Busta	Win	6–4, 6–3

=== Davis Cup ===
==== Titles: 1 (1 wins, 1 runner-up) ====
Edition	Team	Rd	Score
2019	Félix Auger-Aliassime; Vasek Pospisil; Brayden Schnur; Denis Shapovalov	RR	Italy 1–2 Canada
2019	Félix Auger-Aliassime; Vasek Pospisil; Brayden Schnur; Denis Shapovalov	RR	United States 1–2 Canada
2019	Félix Auger-Aliassime; Vasek Pospisil; Brayden Schnur; Denis Shapovalov	QF	Australia 1–2 Canada
2019	Félix Auger-Aliassime; Vasek Pospisil; Brayden Schnur; Denis Shapovalov	SF	Russia 1–2 Canada
2019	Félix Auger-Aliassime; Vasek Pospisil; Brayden Schnur; Denis Shapovalov	F	Canada 0–2 Spain
2022	Félix Auger-Aliassime; Gabriel Diallo; Alexis Galarneau; Vasek Pospisil; Denis Shapovalov	RR	South Korea 1–2 Canada
2022	Félix Auger-Aliassime; Gabriel Diallo; Alexis Galarneau; Vasek Pospisil; Denis Shapovalov	RR	Spain 1–2 Canada
2022	Félix Auger-Aliassime; Gabriel Diallo; Alexis Galarneau; Vasek Pospisil; Denis Shapovalov	RR	Serbia 2–1 Canada
2022	Félix Auger-Aliassime; Gabriel Diallo; Alexis Galarneau; Vasek Pospisil; Denis Shapovalov	QF	Germany 1–2 Canada
2022	Félix Auger-Aliassime; Gabriel Diallo; Alexis Galarneau; Vasek Pospisil; Denis Shapovalov	SF	Italy 1–2 Canada
2022	Félix Auger-Aliassime; Gabriel Diallo; Alexis Galarneau; Vasek Pospisil; Denis Shapovalov	F	Canada 2–0 Australia

==== Participation: 20 (12 wins, 8 losses) ====
Group membership World Group / Finals (6–7) WG play-offs / qualifying round (6–1) Group I/II/III (0–0)	Matches by surface Hard (9–6) Clay (3–2) Grass (0–0)	Matches by type Singles (10–5) Doubles (2–3)	Matches by venue Canada (4–2) Away (8–6)

Group	Rd	Date	Opponent nation	Score	Venue	Surface	Match	Opponent player(s)	W–L	Rubber score
WG	PO	Sep 2016	Chile	5–0	Halifax	Hard (i)	Singles 4 (dead)	Cristian Garín	Win	7–6^{(7–5)}, 6–4
WG	1R	Feb 2017	Great Britain	2–3	Ottawa	Hard (i)	Singles 1	Dan Evans	Loss	3–6, 3–6, 4–6
WG	1R	Feb 2017	Great Britain	2–3	Ottawa	Hard (i)	Singles 5 (decider)	Kyle Edmund	Loss	3–6, 4–6, 1–2 def. (Note: Shapovalov was defaulted from the tournament after striking the umpire in the face with a tennis ball.)
WG	PO	Sep 2017	India	3–2	Edmonton	Hard (i)	Singles 2	Yuki Bhambri	Win	7–6^{(7–2)}, 6–4, 6–7^{(6–8)}, 4–6, 6–1
WG	PO	Sep 2017	India	3–2	Edmonton	Hard (i)	Singles 4	Ramkumar Ramanathan	Win	6–3, 7–6^{(7–1)}, 6–3
WG	1R	Feb 2018	Croatia	1–3	Osijek	Clay (i)	Singles 1	Viktor Galović	Win	6–4, 6–4, 6–2
WG	1R	Feb 2018	Croatia	1–3	Osijek	Clay (i)	Singles 4	Borna Ćorić	Loss	4–6, 4–6, 4–6
WG	PO	Sep 2018	Netherlands	3–1	Toronto	Hard (i)	Singles 2	Robin Haase	Win	3–6, 3–6, 7–5, 6–3, 6–4
F	Qualifying	Feb 2019	Slovakia	3–2	Bratislava	Clay (i)	Singles 1	Filip Horanský	Win	6–4, 7–5
F	Qualifying	Feb 2019	Slovakia	3–2	Bratislava	Clay (i)	Doubles (w/ F Auger-Aliassime)	Martin Kližan; Filip Polášek	Loss	6–3, 5–7, 3–6
F	Qualifying	Feb 2019	Slovakia	3–2	Bratislava	Clay (i)	Singles 4	Martin Kližan	Win	7–6^{(7–4)}, 6–4
F	RR	Nov 2019	Italy	2–1	Madrid	Hard (i)	Singles 2	Matteo Berrettini	Win	7–6^{(7–5)}, 6–7^{(3–7)}, 7–6^{(7–5)}
F	RR	Nov 2019	Italy	2–1	Madrid	Hard (i)	Doubles (w/ V Pospisil)	Matteo Berrettini; Fabio Fognini	Loss	2–6, 6–3, 3–6
F	RR	Nov 2019	United States	2–1	Madrid	Hard (i)	Singles 2	Taylor Fritz	Win	7–6^{(8–6)}, 6–3
F	RR	Nov 2019	United States	2–1	Madrid	Hard (i)	Doubles (w/ V Pospisil)	Sam Querrey; Jack Sock	Loss	Walkover (Note: Querrey/Sock's walkover victory over Pospisil/Shapovalov counted as a 6–0, 6–0 win.)
F	Quarterfinals	Nov 2019	Australia	2–1	Madrid	Hard (i)	Singles 2	Alex de Minaur	Loss	6–3, 3–6, 5–7
F	Quarterfinals	Nov 2019	Australia	2–1	Madrid	Hard (i)	Doubles (w/ V Pospisil)	John Peers; Jordan Thompson	Win	6–4, 6–4
F	Semifinals	Nov 2019	Russia	2–1	Madrid	Hard (i)	Singles 2	Karen Khachanov	Win	6–4, 4–6, 6–4
F	Semifinals	Nov 2019	Russia	2–1	Madrid	Hard (i)	Doubles (w/ V Pospisil)	Karen Khachanov; Andrey Rublev	Win	6–3, 3–6, 7–6^{(7–5)}
F	Final	Nov 2019	Spain	0–2	Madrid	Hard (i)	Singles 2	Rafael Nadal	Loss	3–6, 6–7^{(7–9)}

=== Junior Davis Cup ===
==== Titles: 1 (1 win, 0 runner-ups) ====
Edition	Team	Rd	Score
2015	Félix Auger-Aliassime; Denis Shapovalov; Benjamin Sigouin		
2015	Félix Auger-Aliassime; Denis Shapovalov; Benjamin Sigouin	RR	Canada 3–0 Czech Republic
2015	Félix Auger-Aliassime; Denis Shapovalov; Benjamin Sigouin	RR	Canada 3–0 Hong Kong
2015	Félix Auger-Aliassime; Denis Shapovalov; Benjamin Sigouin	RR	Canada 3–0 Poland
2015	Félix Auger-Aliassime; Denis Shapovalov; Benjamin Sigouin	SF	Canada 3–0 Russia
2015	Félix Auger-Aliassime; Denis Shapovalov; Benjamin Sigouin	F	Canada 2–1 Germany

==== Participation: 8 (8 wins, 0 losses) ====
Group	Rd	Date	Opponent nation	Score	Venue	Surface	Match	Opponent player(s)	W–L	Rubber score
Final	RR	Oct 2015	Czech Republic	3–0	Madrid	Clay	Doubles (w/ B Sigouin)	Patrik Rikl; Michael Vrbenský	Win	7–6^{(7–2)}, 3–6, 6–2
Final	RR	Oct 2015	Hong Kong	3–0	Madrid	Clay	Singles 1	Ming Chun Alan Sou	Win	6–1, 6–1
Final	RR	Oct 2015	Hong Kong	3–0	Madrid	Clay	Doubles (w/ F Auger-Aliassime)	Ching Lam; Ming Chun Alan Sou	Win	6–2, 6–3
Final	RR	Oct 2015	Poland	3–0	Madrid	Clay	Doubles (w/ B Sigouin)	Konrad Fryze; Daniel Michalski	Win	6–1, 6–1
Final	Semifinals	Oct 2015	Russia	3–0	Madrid	Clay	Singles 1	Alen Avidzba	Win	6–4, 6–3
Final	Semifinals	Oct 2015	Russia	3–0	Madrid	Clay	Doubles (w/ F Auger-Aliassime)	Alen Avidzba; Mikhail Sokolovskiy	Win	6–1, 6–3
Final	Final	Oct 2015	Germany	2–1	Madrid	Clay	Singles 1	Marvin Möller	Win	6–1, 6–4
Final	Final	Oct 2015	Germany	2–1	Madrid	Clay	Doubles (w/ F Auger-Aliassime)	Nicola Kuhn; Marvin Möller	Win	6–3, 3–6, 6–2
