= 2012 Jalisco Open – Singles =

Singles
- 2012 Jalisco Open

Final
- Champion: (Brazil) Thiago Alves
- Runner-up: (Italy) Paolo Lorenzi
- Score: 6–3, 7–6^{(7–4)}

Events
Singles	Doubles
← 2011 ·	Jalisco Open	· 2013 →

Paul Capdeville was the defending champion.
Thiago Alves won the title by defeating Paolo Lorenzi 6–3, 7–6^{(7–4)} in the final.

== Seeds ==
1. (France) Édouard Roger-Vasselin (second round)
2. (Germany) Matthias Bachinger (first round)
3. (Italy) Paolo Lorenzi (final)
4. (Canada) Vasek Pospisil (second round)
5. (South Africa) Rik de Voest (first round)
6. (Brazil) Ricardo Mello (first round)
7. (Estonia) Jürgen Zopp (first round)
8. (South Africa) Izak van der Merwe (first round)

== Draw ==
=== Key ===
- Q = Qualifier
- WC = Wild card
- LL = Lucky loser
- Alt = Alternate
- SE = Special exempt
- PR = Protected ranking
- ITF = ITF entry
- JE = Junior exempt
- w/o = Walkover
- r = Retired
- d = Defaulted
- SR = Special ranking

=== Finals ===
Semifinals
(Brazil) Thiago Alves	7	6
(Belgium) Ruben Bemelmans	5	3
3	(Italy) Paolo Lorenzi	6	6
Q	(Moldova) Roman Borvanov	2	4

Final
(Brazil) Thiago Alves	6	7^{7}
3	(Italy) Paolo Lorenzi	3	6^{4}

=== Top half ===
First round
1	(France) É Roger-Vasselin	6^{3}	7	6
Q	(Colombia) R Farah	7^{7}	5	0
(Dominican Republic) V Estrella	6^{6}	4
(Germany) D Meffert	7^{8}	6
(Brazil) T Alves	6	6
(Spain) I Navarro	3	4
(Croatia) A Veić	6	6
6	(Brazil) R Mello	4	2
4	(Canada) V Pospisil	4	7	7
WC	(Mexico) D Garza	6	5	5
(Switzerland) S Bohli	6	3	1
(Belgium) R Bemelmans	4	6	6
WC	(United States) R Ginepri	2	5
(Germany) D Gremelmayr	6	7
(Switzerland) M Chiudinelli	7^{7}	6
7	(Estonia) J Zopp	6^{4}	3

Second round
1	(France) É Roger-Vasselin	4	3
(Germany) D Meffert	6	6
(Brazil) T Alves	6	6
(Croatia) A Veić	4	3
4	(Canada) V Pospisil	4	6	4
(Belgium) R Bemelmans	6	2	6
(Germany) D Gremelmayr	1	6	1
(Switzerland) M Chiudinelli	6	4	6

Quarterfinals
(Germany) D Meffert	5	4
(Brazil) T Alves	7	6
(Belgium) R Bemelmans	7^{7}	6
(Switzerland) M Chiudinelli	6^{5}	0

Semifinals
(Brazil) T Alves	7	6
(Belgium) R Bemelmans	5	3

=== Bottom half ===
First round
5	(South Africa) R de Voest	6	1	1
(France) G Rufin	4	6	6
Q	(Canada) É Chvojka	6	6
(France) M Rodrigues	3	2
(Germany) P Gojowczyk	2	6	6
(Brazil) J Silva	6	2	4
(Spain) A Brugués-Davi	2	2
3	(Italy) P Lorenzi	6	6
8	(South Africa) I van der Merwe	5	4
(Chile) P Capdeville	7	6
(United States) R Ram	6	6
WC	(Mexico) B Rodríguez	3	2
Q	(Mexico) MA Reyes-Varela	6	5	6
WC	(Mexico) C Ramírez	2	7	4
Q	(Moldova) R Borvanov	6	6
2	(Germany) M Bachinger	4	4

Second round
(France) G Rufin	5	3
Q	(Canada) É Chvojka	7	6
(Germany) P Gojowczyk	4	2
3	(Italy) P Lorenzi	6	6
(Chile) P Capdeville	1	1
(United States) R Ram	6	6
Q	(Mexico) MA Reyes-Varela	3	1
Q	(Moldova) R Borvanov	6	6

Quarterfinals
Q	(Canada) É Chvojka	7^{7}	4	3
3	(Italy) P Lorenzi	6^{3}	6	6
(United States) R Ram	3	6	4
Q	(Moldova) R Borvanov	6	4	6

Semifinals
3	(Italy) P Lorenzi	6	6
Q	(Moldova) R Borvanov	2	4
