= 2011 Jalisco Open – Singles =

Singles
- 2011 Jalisco Open

Final
- Champion: (Chile) Paul Capdeville
- Runner-up: (Canada) Pierre-Ludovic Duclos
- Score: 7–5, 6–1

Events
Singles	Doubles
← 2010 ·	Jalisco Open	· 2012 →

This was the first edition of this tournament.

2nd seed Paul Capdeville won the final, defeating Pierre-Ludovic Duclos 7–5, 6–1.

== Seeds ==
1. (Brazil) João Souza (semifinals)
2. (Chile) Paul Capdeville (champion)
3. (United States) Bobby Reynolds (first round)
4. (Colombia) Carlos Salamanca (quarterfinals)
5. (Canada) Vasek Pospisil (quarterfinals)
6. (Israel) Amir Weintraub (second round)
7. (Thailand) Danai Udomchoke (first round)
8. (Slovakia) Ivo Klec (second round)

== Draw ==
=== Key ===
- Q = Qualifier
- WC = Wild card
- LL = Lucky loser
- Alt = Alternate
- SE = Special exempt
- PR = Protected ranking
- ITF = ITF entry
- JE = Junior exempt
- w/o = Walkover
- r = Retired
- d = Defaulted
- SR = Special ranking

=== Finals ===
Semifinals
1	(Brazil) João Souza	5	6^{7}
LL	(Canada) Pierre-Ludovic Duclos	7	7^{9}
(Czech Republic) Jan Mertl	4	6	4
2	(Chile) Paul Capdeville	6	4	6

Final
LL	(Canada) Pierre-Ludovic Duclos	5	1
2	(Chile) Paul Capdeville	7	6

=== Top half ===
First round
1	(Brazil) J Souza	4	6	7^{7}
(United States) Greg Ouellette	6	2	6^{1}
Q	(Mexico) MÁ Reyes-Varela	6	3	6
Q	(Mexico) L Díaz-Barriga	3	6	4
(Mexico) D Garza	6^{5}	7^{7}	6
(South Africa) R Klaasen	7^{7}	6^{3}	4
WC	(Mexico) M Gallardo-Vallés	4	5
5	(Canada) V Pospisil	6	7
4	(Colombia) C Salamanca	7	6
(Ecuador) I Endara	5	3
(New Zealand) A Sitak	7	6
(Japan) T Matsui	5	2
Q	(Philippines) R Gonzales	3	3
LL	(Canada) P-L Duclos	6	6
(Germany) A Begemann	7	6
7	(Thailand) D Udomchoke	5	4

Second round
1	(Brazil) J Souza	6^{10}	6	7^{7}
Q	(Mexico) MÁ Reyes-Varela	7^{12}	2	6^{2}
(Mexico) D Garza	4	6^{5}
5	(Canada) V Pospisil	6	7^{7}
4	(Colombia) C Salamanca	6	6
(New Zealand) A Sitak	3	2
LL	(Canada) P-L Duclos	6	3	6
(Germany) A Begemann	3	6	3

Quarterfinals
1	(Brazil) J Souza	6^{1}	6	6
5	(Canada) V Pospisil	7^{7}	3	3
4	(Colombia) C Salamanca	2	7^{7}	3
LL	(Canada) P-L Duclos	6	6^{5}	6

Semifinals
1	(Brazil) J Souza	5	6^{7}
LL	(Canada) P-L Duclos	7	7^{9}

=== Bottom half ===
First round
8	(Slovakia) I Klec	6	6
WC	(Mexico) M Sánchez	1	4
(United Kingdom) J Baker	6	6
WC	(Mexico) Júlio César Vázquez	0	1
WC	(Mexico) Luis Patiño	6	6^{11}	1
(United States) N Monroe	4	7^{13}	6
(Czech Republic) J Mertl	7^{8}	6
3	(United States) B Reynolds	6^{6}	4
6	(Israel) A Weintraub	6	1	6
(United States) K Kim	3	6	4
(United States) A El Mihdawy	3	5
(France) L Walter	6	7
(Uruguay) M Felder	1	1^{d}
Q	(Colombia) JS Gómez	6	1
(Moldova) R Borvanov	6^{7}	6	2
2	(Chile) P Capdeville	7^{9}	4	6

Second round
8	(Slovakia) I Klec	3	3
(United Kingdom) J Baker	6	6
(United States) N Monroe	4	1
(Czech Republic) J Mertl	6	6
6	(Israel) A Weintraub	2	2
(France) L Walter	6	6
Q	(Colombia) JS Gómez	0	4
2	(Chile) P Capdeville	6	6

Quarterfinals
(United Kingdom) J Baker	6	4	3
(Czech Republic) J Mertl	3	6	6
(France) L Walter	4	6^{2}
2	(Chile) P Capdeville	6	7^{7}

Semifinals
(Czech Republic) J Mertl	4	6	4
2	(Chile) P Capdeville	6	4	6
