= 2016 Jalisco Open – Singles =

Singles
- 2016 Jalisco Open

Final
- Champion: (Tunisia) Malek Jaziri
- Runner-up: (France) Stéphane Robert
- Score: 5–7, 6–3, 7–6^{(7–5)}

Events
Singles	Doubles
← 2015 ·	Jalisco Open	· 2017 →

Rajeev Ram was the defending champion but chose not to participate.

Malek Jaziri won the title, defeating Stéphane Robert 5–7, 6–3, 7–6^{(7–5)} in the final.

== Seeds ==
1. (Dominican Republic) Víctor Estrella Burgos (first round)
2. (France) Lucas Pouille (quarterfinals)
3. (Bosnia and Herzegovina) Damir Džumhur (second round)
4. (Spain) Roberto Carballés Baena (first round)
5. (Tunisia) Malek Jaziri (champion)
6. (Argentina) Horacio Zeballos (semifinals)
7. (Colombia) Alejandro Falla (first round)
8. (Germany) Daniel Brands (first round)

== Draw ==
=== Key ===
- Q = Qualifier
- WC = Wild card
- LL = Lucky loser
- Alt = Alternate
- SE = Special exempt
- PR = Protected ranking
- ITF = ITF entry
- JE = Junior exempt
- w/o = Walkover
- r = Retired
- d = Defaulted
- SR = Special ranking

=== Finals ===
Semifinals
(United States) Alexander Sarkissian	6	6^{5}	1
(France) Stéphane Robert	4	7^{7}	6
6	(Argentina) Horacio Zeballos	7^{7}	3	4
5	(Tunisia) Malek Jaziri	6^{5}	6	6

Final
(France) Stéphane Robert	7	3	6^{5}
5	(Tunisia) Malek Jaziri	5	6	7^{7}

=== Top half ===
First round
1	(Dominican Republic) V Estrella Burgos	2	6	5
(United States) A Sarkissian	6	2	7
WC	(Mexico) M Sánchez	6^{2}	6	3
WC	(Mexico) L Gómez	7^{7}	4	6
(United Kingdom) J Ward	7	6
(Spain) A Montañés	5	3
(Colombia) A González	6	4	6
7	(Colombia) A Falla	3	6	3
4	(Spain) R Carballés Baena	2	6	3
(United States) D Novikov	6	4	6
SE	(Colombia) E Struvay	6	6
WC	(Mexico) H Hach Verdugo	4	2
Q	(United States) E Escobedo	4	2
(France) S Robert	6	6
(Republic of Ireland) J McGee	6	6
8	(Germany) D Brands	2	2

Second round
(United States) A Sarkissian	6	7^{7}
WC	(Mexico) L Gómez	1	6^{1}
(United Kingdom) J Ward	5	6	4
(Colombia) A González	7	2	6
(United States) D Novikov	6	6
SE	(Colombia) E Struvay	3	4
(France) S Robert	6	4	6
(Republic of Ireland) J McGee	4	6	4

Quarterfinals
(United States) A Sarkissian	6	7^{7}
(Colombia) A González	0	6^{4}
(United States) D Novikov	1	5
(France) S Robert	6	7

Semifinals
(United States) A Sarkissian	6	6^{5}	1
(France) S Robert	4	7^{7}	6

=== Bottom half ===
First round
6	(Argentina) H Zeballos	6	7^{7}
WC	(Mexico) T Hank	3	6^{4}
(France) M Bourgue	6	4	7^{7}
(Argentina) F Argüello	3	6	6^{4}
SE	(Serbia) P Krstin	7^{8}	1	3
(Spain) A Menéndez-Maceiras	6^{6}	6	6
Q	(El Salvador) M Arévalo	2	3
3	(Bosnia and Herzegovina) D Džumhur	6	6
5	(Tunisia) M Jaziri	6	6
Alt	(Spain) O Roca Batalla	4	4
Q	(Australia) M Matosevic	7^{8}	6
Alt	(Spain) J Samper-Montaña	6^{6}	1
Q	(Colombia) DE Galán	6	7^{8}
(Italy) M Donati	4	6^{6}
(Brazil) A Ghem	3	7	2
2	(France) L Pouille	6	5	6

Second round
6	(Argentina) H Zeballos	7^{7}	6
(France) M Bourgue	6^{4}	4
(Spain) A Menéndez-Maceiras	1	6	6
3	(Bosnia and Herzegovina) D Džumhur	6	2	0
5	(Tunisia) M Jaziri	6	6
Q	(Australia) M Matosevic	4	3
Q	(Colombia) DE Galán	3	4
2	(France) L Pouille	6	6

Quarterfinals
6	(Argentina) H Zeballos	6	3	7
(Spain) A Menéndez-Maceiras	1	6	5
5	(Tunisia) M Jaziri	3	6	7
2	(France) L Pouille	6	3	5

Semifinals
6	(Argentina) H Zeballos	7^{7}	3	4
5	(Tunisia) M Jaziri	6^{5}	6	6
