= 2014 Jalisco Open – Doubles =

Doubles
- 2014 Jalisco Open

Final
- Champion: (Mexico) César Ramírez (Mexico) Miguel Ángel Reyes-Varela
- Runner-up: (Germany) Andre Begemann (Australia) Matthew Ebden
- Score: 6–4, 6–2

Events
Singles	Doubles
← 2013 ·	Jalisco Open	· 2015 →

Marin Draganja and Mate Pavić were the defending champion, but lost in the semifinals to Andre Begemann and Matthew Ebden.

César Ramírez and Miguel Ángel Reyes-Varela won the title, defeating Andre Begemann and Matthew Ebden in the final, 6–4, 6–2.

== Seeds ==
1. (Croatia) Marin Draganja / (Croatia) Mate Pavić (semifinals)
2. (India) Purav Raja / (India) Divij Sharan (first round)
3. (Germany) Andre Begemann / (Australia) Matthew Ebden (final)
4. (Australia) Samuel Groth / (Australia) Chris Guccione (first round)

== Draw ==
=== Key ===
- Q = Qualifier
- WC = Wild card
- LL = Lucky loser
- Alt = Alternate
- SE = Special exempt
- PR = Protected ranking
- ITF = ITF entry
- JE = Junior exempt
- w/o = Walkover
- r = Retired
- d = Defaulted
- SR = Special ranking

=== Draw ===
First round
1	(Croatia) M Draganja (Croatia) M Pavić	6	6
WC	(United States) J Cerretani (Mexico) D Garza	3	4
(United States) N Monroe (United States) R Ram	7^{7}	6
(Dominican Republic) V Estrella Burgos (Tunisia) M Jaziri	6^{3}	2
3	(Germany) A Begemann (Australia) M Ebden	6	4	[10]
(United Kingdom) J Delgado (Sweden) A Siljeström	2	6	[3]
(France) K de Schepper (France) P-H Herbert	4	6^{3}
(Germany) D Brown (Croatia) F Škugor	6	7^{7}
WC	(Mexico) C Ramírez (Mexico) MA Reyes-Varela	6	6
(Australia) P Hanley (Brazil) A Sá	2	4
(Brazil) M Demoliner (Australia) J-P Smith	6	3	[10]
4	(Australia) S Groth (Australia) C Guccione	3	6	[5]
(Russia) A Bogomolov Jr. (Australia) J Kerr	6	6
WC	(Mexico) T Hank (Mexico) Alejandro Moreno Figueroa	1	3
(Germany) G Kretschmer (Germany) J-L Struff	6	3	[14]
2	(India) P Raja (India) D Sharan	4	6	[12]

Quarterfinals
1	(Croatia) M Draganja (Croatia) M Pavić	6	6
(United States) N Monroe (United States) R Ram	4	4
3	(Germany) A Begemann (Australia) M Ebden	6	7^{9}
(Germany) D Brown (Croatia) F Škugor	2	6^{7}
WC	(Mexico) C Ramírez (Mexico) MA Reyes-Varela	7	6
(Brazil) M Demoliner (Australia) J-P Smith	5	1
(Russia) A Bogomolov Jr. (Australia) J Kerr	2	3
(Germany) G Kretschmer (Germany) J-L Struff	6	6

Semifinals
1	(Croatia) M Draganja (Croatia) M Pavić	3	4
3	(Germany) A Begemann (Australia) M Ebden	6	6
WC	(Mexico) C Ramírez (Mexico) MA Reyes-Varela	6	7^{7}
(Germany) G Kretschmer (Germany) J-L Struff	2	6^{4}

Final
3	(Germany) A Begemann (Australia) M Ebden	4	2
WC	(Mexico) C Ramírez (Mexico) MA Reyes-Varela	6	6
