= 2013 Jalisco Open – Doubles =

Doubles
- 2013 Jalisco Open

Final
- Champions: (Croatia) Marin Draganja (Croatia) Mate Pavić
- Runners-up: (Australia) Samuel Groth (Australia) John-Patrick Smith
- Score: 5–7, 6–2, [13–11]

Events
Singles	Doubles
← 2012 ·	Jalisco Open	· 2014 →

James Cerretani and Adil Shamasdin were the defending champions but lost in the semifinals.
Marin Draganja and Mate Pavić won the title by defeating Samuel Groth and John-Patrick Smith 5–7, 6–2, [13–11] in the final.

== Seeds ==
1. (Thailand) Sanchai Ratiwatana / (Thailand) Sonchat Ratiwatana (first round)
2. (United States) James Cerretani / (Canada) Adil Shamasdin (semifinals)
3. (Germany) Benjamin Becker / (United States) Rajeev Ram (quarterfinals)
4. (Australia) Samuel Groth / (Australia) John-Patrick Smith (final)

== Draw ==
=== Key ===
- Q = Qualifier
- WC = Wild card
- LL = Lucky loser
- Alt = Alternate
- SE = Special exempt
- PR = Protected ranking
- ITF = ITF entry
- JE = Junior exempt
- w/o = Walkover
- r = Retired
- d = Defaulted
- SR = Special ranking

=== Draw ===
First round
1	(Thailand) Sa Ratiwatana (Thailand) So Ratiwatana	6^{2}	4
(Croatia) M Draganja (Croatia) M Pavić	7^{7}	6
(Australia) C Guccione (Australia) J Kerr	5	6^{9}
(Canada) V Pospisil (United States) B Reynolds	7	7^{11}
3	(Germany) B Becker (United States) R Ram	7^{7}	7^{8}
WC	(Mexico) Alejandro Moreno Figueroa (Mexico) M Sánchez	6^{0}	6^{6}
(Switzerland) M Chiudinelli (Japan) Y Sugita	4	2
(India) P Raja (India) D Sharan	6	6
(Germany) P Gojowczyk (Chinese Taipei) Y-h Lu	6	6^{6}	[5]
WC	(Australia) C Ball (Mexico) D Garza	0	7^{8}	[10]
WC	(Chile) N Massú (Mexico) MÁ Reyes-Varela	6	2	[7]
4	(Australia) S Groth (Australia) J-P Smith	4	6	[10]
(Australia) J Millman (Poland) M Przysiężny	7^{7}	4	[10]
(Chinese Taipei) H-h Lee (Chinese Taipei) H-y Peng	6^{4}	6	[8]
(Brazil) M Demoliner (Croatia) F Škugor	1	4
2	(United States) J Cerretani (Canada) A Shamasdin	6	6

Quarterfinals
(Croatia) M Draganja (Croatia) M Pavić	3	7^{7}	[10]
(Canada) V Pospisil (United States) B Reynolds	6	6^{5}	[2]
3	(Germany) B Becker (United States) R Ram	4	6	[8]
(India) P Raja (India) D Sharan	6	3	[10]
WC	(Australia) C Ball (Mexico) D Garza	4	5
4	(Australia) S Groth (Australia) J-P Smith	6	7
(Australia) J Millman (Poland) M Przysiężny	4	2
2	(United States) J Cerretani (Canada) A Shamasdin	6	6

Semifinals
(Croatia) M Draganja (Croatia) M Pavić	7^{7}	6
(India) P Raja (India) D Sharan	6^{2}	4
4	(Australia) S Groth (Australia) J-P Smith	6	6^{5}	[11]
2	(United States) J Cerretani (Canada) A Shamasdin	1	7^{7}	[9]

Final
(Croatia) M Draganja (Croatia) M Pavić	5	6	[13]
4	(Australia) S Groth (Australia) J-P Smith	7	2	[11]
