= 2011 Jalisco Open – Doubles =

Doubles
- 2011 Jalisco Open

Final
- Champions: (Canada) Vasek Pospisil (United States) Bobby Reynolds
- Runners-up: (Canada) Pierre-Ludovic Duclos (Slovakia) Ivo Klec
- Score: 6–4, 6–7(6), [10–6]

Events
Singles	Doubles
- Jalisco Open

Vasek Pospisil and Bobby Reynolds won the first edition of this tournament, beating Pierre-Ludovic Duclos and Ivo Klec 6–4, 6–7(6), [10–6] in the final.

== Seeds ==
1. (Australia) Jordan Kerr / (United States) Travis Parrott (semifinals)
2. (Canada) Vasek Pospisil / (United States) Bobby Reynolds (champions)
3. (Canada) Pierre-Ludovic Duclos / (Slovakia) Ivo Klec (final)
4. (United States) John Paul Fruttero / (South Africa) Raven Klaasen (first round)

== Draw ==
Key

- Q = Qualifier
- WC = Wild card
- LL = Lucky loser
- Alt = Alternate
- ITF = ITF entry
- PR = Protected ranking
- SR = Special ranking
- SE = Special exempt
- JE = Junior exempt
- JR = Junior Accelerator Programme entrant
- CO = College Accelerator Programme entrant
- NG = Next Gen Accelerator Program entrant
- w/o = Walkover
- r = Retired
- d = Defaulted

=== Draw ===
First round
1	(Australia) J Kerr (United States) T Parrott	6	6
(United States) A El Mihdawy (Ecuador) I Endara	0	1
(United States) K Kim (United States) Greg Ouellette	4	4
(Czech Republic) J Mertl (Thailand) D Udomchoke	6	6
3	(Canada) P-L Duclos (Slovakia) I Klec	7^{7}	6
(Germany) A Begemann (United States) N Monroe	6^{0}	3
WC	(Mexico) M Gallardo-Vallés (Mexico) M Sánchez	4	3
(Mexico) D Garza (Brazil) J Souza	6	6
(Mexico) L Díaz-Barriga (Mexico) MÁ Reyes-Varela	6	6
WC	(Colombia) JS Gómez (Mexico) Luis Patiño	4	2
(Uruguay) M Felder (Colombia) C Salamanca	7^{7}	3	[10]
4	(United States) JP Fruttero (South Africa) R Klaasen	6^{2}	6	[7]
(Moldova) R Borvanov (Japan) T Matsui	6^{5}	7	[10]
(France) L Walter (Israel) A Weintraub	7^{7}	5	[6]
WC	(Chile) P Capdeville (Mexico) A Ruiz-Rosales	3	4
2	(Canada) V Pospisil (United States) B Reynolds	6	6

Quarterfinals
1	(Australia) J Kerr (United States) T Parrott	7	6
(Czech Republic) J Mertl (Thailand) D Udomchoke	5	2
3	(Canada) P-L Duclos (Slovakia) I Klec	6	6
(Mexico) D Garza (Brazil) J Souza	3	4
(Mexico) L Díaz-Barriga (Mexico) MÁ Reyes-Varela	6^{4}	6	[7]
(Uruguay) M Felder (Colombia) C Salamanca	7^{7}	3	[10]
(Moldova) R Borvanov (Japan) T Matsui	6^{4}	4
2	(Canada) V Pospisil (United States) B Reynolds	7^{7}	6

Semifinals
1	(Australia) J Kerr (United States) T Parrott	7	3	[13]
3	(Canada) P-L Duclos (Slovakia) I Klec	5	6	[15]
(Uruguay) M Felder (Colombia) C Salamanca	2	6^{4}
2	(Canada) V Pospisil (United States) B Reynolds	6	7^{7}

Final
3	(Canada) P-L Duclos (Slovakia) I Klec	4	7^{8}	[6]
2	(Canada) V Pospisil (United States) B Reynolds	6	6^{6}	[10]
