= 2012 Jalisco Open – Doubles =

Doubles
- 2012 Jalisco Open

Final
- Champions: (United States) James Cerretani (Canada) Adil Shamasdin
- Runners-up: (Poland) Tomasz Bednarek (France) Olivier Charroin
- Score: 7–6^{(7–5)}, 6–1

Events
Singles	Doubles
- Jalisco Open

Vasek Pospisil and Bobby Reynolds were the defending champions but Reynolds decided not to participate.
Pospisil played alongside Rajeev Ram.
James Cerretani and Adil Shamasdin won the final 7–6^{(7–5)}, 6–1 against Tomasz Bednarek and Olivier Charroin.

== Seeds ==
1. (United States) James Cerretani / (Canada) Adil Shamasdin (champions)
2. (Canada) Vasek Pospisil / (United States) Rajeev Ram (semifinals)
3. (Poland) Tomasz Bednarek / (France) Olivier Charroin (finals)
4. (United States) Travis Parrott / (United States) Travis Rettenmaier (first round)

== Draw ==
Key

- Q = Qualifier
- WC = Wild card
- LL = Lucky loser
- Alt = Alternate
- ITF = ITF entry
- PR = Protected ranking
- SR = Special ranking
- SE = Special exempt
- JE = Junior exempt
- JR = Junior Accelerator Programme entrant
- CO = College Accelerator Programme entrant
- NG = Next Gen Accelerator Program entrant
- w/o = Walkover
- r = Retired
- d = Defaulted

=== Draw ===
First round
1	(United States) J Cerretani (Canada) A Shamasdin	4	7^{7}	[10]
(Italy) P Lorenzi (Spain) I Navarro	6	6^{4}	[7]
WC	(Uruguay) M Felder (Mexico) D Garza	6^{3}	7^{7}	[11]
(Colombia) R Farah (Estonia) J Zopp	7^{7}	6^{4}	[13]
4	(United States) T Parrott (United States) T Rettenmaier	6^{0}	6^{5}
(Brazil) R Mello (Brazil) J Silva	7^{7}	7^{7}
(Germany) M Bachinger (Germany) D Gremelmayr	7^{7}	4	[6]
(South Africa) R de Voest (South Africa) I van der Merwe	6^{5}	6	[10]
WC	(Monaco) B Balleret (France) É Roger-Vasselin	6	1	[10]
(Brazil) T Alves (Chile) P Capdeville	4	6	[4]
(Canada) P-L Duclos (Australia) C Guccione	3	2
3	(Poland) T Bednarek (France) O Charroin	6	6
(Belgium) R Bemelmans (Switzerland) M Chiudinelli	3	6	[10]
WC	(Mexico) L Díaz-Barriga (Mexico) C Ramírez	6	2	[4]
(Spain) A Brugués-Davi (Dominican Republic) V Estrella	3	3
2	(Canada) V Pospisil (United States) R Ram	6	6

Quarterfinals
1	(United States) J Cerretani (Canada) A Shamasdin	6	6^{4}	[12]
(Colombia) R Farah (Estonia) J Zopp	3	7^{7}	[10]
(Brazil) R Mello (Brazil) J Silva	3	2
(South Africa) R de Voest (South Africa) I van der Merwe	6	6
WC	(Monaco) B Balleret (France) É Roger-Vasselin
3	(Poland) T Bednarek (France) O Charroin	w/o
(Belgium) R Bemelmans (Switzerland) M Chiudinelli	6^{1}	2
2	(Canada) V Pospisil (United States) R Ram	7^{7}	6

Semifinals
1	(United States) J Cerretani (Canada) A Shamasdin	7	3	[10]
(South Africa) R de Voest (South Africa) I van der Merwe	5	6	[7]
3	(Poland) T Bednarek (France) O Charroin	6	6
2	(Canada) V Pospisil (United States) R Ram	2	2

Final
1	(United States) J Cerretani (Canada) A Shamasdin	7^{7}	6
3	(Poland) T Bednarek (France) O Charroin	6^{5}	1
