= 2014 Jalisco Open =

- Date: 25–30 March
- Edition: 4th
- Draw: 32S / 16D
- Prize money: $100,000+H
- Surface: Hard
- Location: Guadalajara, Mexico

Champions

Singles
- (Luxembourg) Gilles Müller

Doubles
- (Mexico) César Ramírez / (Mexico) Miguel Ángel Reyes-Varela
← 2013 ·	Jalisco Open	· 2015 →

The 2014 Jalisco Open was a professional tennis tournament played on hard courts. It was the fourth edition of the tournament which was part of the 2014 ATP Challenger Tour. It took place in Guadalajara, Mexico between 25 and 30 March 2014.

== Singles main-draw entrants ==
=== Seeds ===
Country	Player	Rank^{1}	Seed
FRA	Kenny de Schepper	66	1
AUS	Matthew Ebden	67	2
RUS	Alex Bogomolov Jr.	94	3
DOM	Víctor Estrella Burgos	100	4
GER	Dustin Brown	102	5
GER	Jan-Lennard Struff	104	6
SVK	Lukáš Lacko	105	7
GER	Peter Gojowczyk	111	8

- ^{1} Rankings are as of March 17, 2014.

=== Other entrants ===
The following players received wildcards into the singles main draw:

- (Mexico) Lucas Gómez
- (Mexico) Eduardo Yahir Orozco Rangel
- (Mexico) César Ramírez
- (Mexico) Miguel Ángel Reyes-Varela

The following players gained entry into the singles main draw as a special exempt:

- (Australia) Samuel Groth
- (Croatia) Ante Pavić

The following players gained entry into the singles main draw as an alternate:

- (Japan) Hiroki Moriya
- (Italy) Andrea Arnaboldi

The following players received entry from the qualifying draw:

- (Luxembourg) Gilles Müller
- (Zimbabwe) Takanyi Garanganga
- (Argentina) Agustín Velotti
- (El Salvador) Marcelo Arévalo

== Champions ==
=== Singles ===
- (Luxembourg) Gilles Müller def. (United States) Denis Kudla, 6–2, 6–2

=== Doubles ===
- (Mexico) César Ramírez / (Mexico) Miguel Ángel Reyes-Varela def. (Germany) Andre Begemann / (Australia) Matthew Ebden, 6–4, 6–2
