= 2015 Jalisco Open =

- Date: 20–26 April
- Edition: 5th
- Draw: 32S / 16D
- Prize money: $100,000+H
- Surface: Hard
- Location: Guadalajara, Mexico

Champions

Singles
- (United States) Rajeev Ram

Doubles
- (United States) Austin Krajicek / (United States) Rajeev Ram
← 2014 ·	Jalisco Open	· 2016 →

The 2015 Jalisco Open was a professional tennis tournament played on hard courts. It was the fifth edition of the tournament which was part of the 2015 ATP Challenger Tour. It took place in Guadalajara, Mexico between 20 and 26 April 2015.

== Singles main-draw entrants ==
=== Seeds ===
Country	Player	Rank^{1}	Seed
ESP	Adrián Menéndez Maceiras	115	1
COL	Alejandro Falla	116	2
USA	Austin Krajicek	121	3
USA	Ryan Harrison	126	4
POL	Michał Przysiężny	142	5
USA	Denis Kudla	150	6
AUS	John-Patrick Smith	155	7
USA	Rajeev Ram	185	8

- ^{1} Rankings are as of April 13, 2015.

=== Other entrants ===
The following players received wildcards into the singles main draw:

- (Mexico) César Ramírez
- (Mexico) Daniel Garza
- (Mexico) Miguel Ángel Reyes-Varela
- (Mexico) Lucas Gómez

The following players received entry from the qualifying draw:

- (Brazil) Henrique Cunha
- (United States) Kevin King
- (Mexico) Luis Patiño
- (Peru) Mauricio Echazú

== Champions ==
=== Singles ===
- (United States) Rajeev Ram def. (United States) Jason Jung, 6–1, 6–2

=== Doubles ===
- (United States) Austin Krajicek / (United States) Rajeev Ram def. (Brazil) Marcelo Demoliner / (Mexico) Miguel Ángel Reyes-Varela, 7–5, 4–6, [10–6]
