= 2012 Jalisco Open =

- Date: 12–18 March
- Edition: 2nd
- Location: Guadalajara, Mexico

Champions

Singles
- (Brazil) Thiago Alves

Doubles
- (United States) James Cerretani / (Canada) Adil Shamasdin
← 2011 ·	Jalisco Open	· 2013 →

The 2012 Jalisco Open was a professional tennis tournament played on hard courts. It was the second edition of the tournament which was part of the 2012 ATP Challenger Tour. It took place in Guadalajara, Mexico between 12 and 18 March 2012.

== Singles main-draw entrants ==
=== Seeds ===
Country	Player	Rank^{1}	Seed
FRA	Édouard Roger-Vasselin	87	1
GER	Matthias Bachinger	94	2
ITA	Paolo Lorenzi	97	3
CAN	Vasek Pospisil	114	4
RSA	Rik de Voest	119	5
BRA	Ricardo Mello	121	6
EST	Jürgen Zopp	123	7
RSA	Izak van der Merwe	132	8

- ^{1} Rankings are as of March 5, 2012.

=== Other entrants ===
The following players received wildcards into the singles main draw:

- (Mexico) Daniel Garza
- (United States) Robby Ginepri
- (Mexico) César Ramírez
- (Mexico) Bruno Rodríguez

The following players received entry from the qualifying draw:

- (Moldova) Roman Borvanov
- (Canada) Érik Chvojka
- (Colombia) Robert Farah
- (Mexico) Miguel Ángel Reyes-Varela

== Champions ==
=== Singles ===
- (Brazil) Thiago Alves def. (Italy) Paolo Lorenzi, 6–3, 7–6^{(7–4)}

=== Doubles ===
- (United States) James Cerretani / (Canada) Adil Shamasdin def. (Poland) Tomasz Bednarek / (France) Olivier Charroin, 7–6^{(7–5)}, 6–1
