= 2013 Jalisco Open – Singles =

Singles
- 2013 Jalisco Open

Final
- Champion: (Russia) Alex Bogomolov Jr.
- Runner-up: (United States) Rajeev Ram
- Score: 2–6, 6–3, 6–1

Events
Singles	Doubles
← 2012 ·	Jalisco Open	· 2014 →

Thiago Alves was the defending champion but chose to compete in the 2013 Taroii Open de Tênis instead.
Alex Bogomolov Jr. won the title after defeating Rajeev Ram 2–6, 6–3, 6–1 in the final.

== Seeds ==
1. (Chinese Taipei) Lu Yen-hsun (quarterfinals)
2. (Germany) Benjamin Becker (first round)
3. (United States) Rajeev Ram (final)
4. (Israel) Dudi Sela (second round, retired)
5. (France) Adrian Mannarino (semifinals)
6. (Australia) John Millman (second round)
7. (Spain) Daniel Muñoz de la Nava (quarterfinals)
8. (Russia) Alex Bogomolov Jr. (champion)

== Draw ==
=== Key ===
- Q = Qualifier
- WC = Wild card
- LL = Lucky loser
- Alt = Alternate
- SE = Special exempt
- PR = Protected ranking
- ITF = ITF entry
- JE = Junior exempt
- w/o = Walkover
- r = Retired
- d = Defaulted
- SR = Special ranking

=== Finals ===
Semifinals
8	(Russia) Alex Bogomolov Jr.	6	1	6
5	(France) Adrian Mannarino	2	6	2
3	(United States) Rajeev Ram	6	6
(Canada) Vasek Pospisil	4	3

Final
8	(Russia) Alex Bogomolov Jr.	2	6	6
3	(United States) Rajeev Ram	6	3	1

=== Top half ===
First round
1	(Chinese Taipei) Y-h Lu	6	7
(Slovakia) A Martin	4	5
(Germany) P Gojowczyk	6	6
WC	(Chile) N Massú	4	3
Q	(Austria) M Neuchrist	4	2
(France) G Burquier	6	6
(Chinese Taipei) J Wang	1^{r}
8	(Russia) A Bogomolov Jr.	5
4	(Israel) D Sela	6	6
WC	(Mexico) Eduardo Peralta-Tello	4	1
(United States) D Young	3	1
(Spain) A Menéndez-Maceiras	6	6
WC	(Mexico) MÁ Reyes-Varela	3	0
Q	(Germany) P Torebko	6	6
Q	(Japan) Bumpei Sato	2	3
5	(France) A Mannarino	6	6

Second round
1	(Chinese Taipei) Y-h Lu	7^{7}	6
(Germany) P Gojowczyk	6^{5}	1
(France) G Burquier	3	7	2
8	(Russia) A Bogomolov Jr.	6	5	6
4	(Israel) D Sela	6^{1}	0^{r}
(Spain) A Menéndez-Maceiras	7^{7}	0
Q	(Germany) P Torebko	3	7^{7}	3
5	(France) A Mannarino	6	6^{5}	6

Quarterfinals
1	(Chinese Taipei) Y-h Lu	6	1	6^{8}
8	(Russia) A Bogomolov Jr.	2	6	7^{10}
(Spain) A Menéndez-Maceiras	3	4
5	(France) A Mannarino	6	6

Semifinals
8	(Russia) A Bogomolov Jr.	6	1	6
5	(France) A Mannarino	2	6	2

=== Bottom half ===
First round
7	(Spain) D Muñoz de la Nava	3	6	7^{7}
(Australia) M Barton	6	4	6^{3}
(Japan) Y Sugita	2	6	0
(Australia) J-P Smith	6	4	6
(Poland) M Przysiężny	1	6	6
(Israel) A Weintraub	6	3	2
Q	(Croatia) M Draganja	4	6	3
3	(United States) R Ram	6	3	6
6	(Australia) J Millman	4	6	2
(Australia) S Groth	6	1	0^{r}
(Switzerland) M Chiudinelli	6	7
WC	(Mexico) M Gallardo Valles	3	5
(Czech Republic) J Hernych	7	6^{2}	1
(Canada) V Pospisil	5	7^{7}	6
(United States) B Reynolds	6	6
2	(Germany) B Becker	3	2

Second round
7	(Spain) D Muñoz de la Nava	3	6	6
(Australia) J-P Smith	6	3	4
(Poland) M Przysiężny	4	5
3	(United States) R Ram	6	7
6	(Australia) J Millman	4	6	3
(Switzerland) M Chiudinelli	6	2	6
(Canada) V Pospisil	7^{7}	3	6
(United States) B Reynolds	6^{1}	6	4

Quarterfinals
7	(Spain) D Muñoz de la Nava	6^{4}	2
3	(United States) R Ram	7^{7}	6
(Switzerland) M Chiudinelli	4	4
(Canada) V Pospisil	6	6

Semifinals
3	(United States) R Ram	6	6
(Canada) V Pospisil	4	3
