= 2015 Jalisco Open – Doubles =

Doubles
- 2015 Jalisco Open

Final
- Champion: (United States) Austin Krajicek (United States) Rajeev Ram
- Runner-up: (Brazil) Marcelo Demoliner (Mexico) Miguel Ángel Reyes-Varela
- Score: 7–5, 4–6, [10–6]

Events
Singles	Doubles
- Jalisco Open

César Ramírez and Miguel Ángel Reyes-Varela were the defending champion. This year, Ramírez partnered Adrián Menéndez-Maceiras, but they lost to Kevin King and Dean O'Brien in the quarterfinals. Reyes-Varela played with Marcelo Demoliner.

Austin Krajicek and Rajeev Ram won the title, defeating Demoliner and Reyes-Varela in the final, 7–5, 4–6, [10–6].

== Seeds ==
1. (United States) Austin Krajicek / (United States) Rajeev Ram (champions)
2. (Colombia) Nicolás Barrientos / (Colombia) Eduardo Struvay (semifinals)
3. (Brazil) Marcelo Demoliner / (Mexico) Miguel Ángel Reyes-Varela (final)
4. (Spain) Adrián Menéndez-Maceiras / (Mexico) César Ramírez (quarterfinals)

== Draw ==
Key

- Q = Qualifier
- WC = Wild card
- LL = Lucky loser
- Alt = Alternate
- ITF = ITF entry
- PR = Protected ranking
- SR = Special ranking
- SE = Special exempt
- JE = Junior exempt
- JR = Junior Accelerator Programme entrant
- CO = College Accelerator Programme entrant
- NG = Next Gen Accelerator Program entrant
- w/o = Walkover
- r = Retired
- d = Defaulted

First round
1	(United States) A Krajicek (United States) R Ram	6	6
(Brazil) Henrique Cunha (Bulgaria) D Kutrovsky	3	2
(El Salvador) M Arévalo (France) R Boutillier	6	6
WC	(Mexico) T Hank (Mexico) M Sánchez	4	2
4	(Spain) A Menéndez-Maceiras (Mexico) C Ramírez	3	6	[11]
(Ecuador) G Lapentti (Venezuela) LD Martínez	6	4	[9]
(United States) K King (South Africa) D O'Brien	6	7^{7}
(Ecuador) G Escobar (Argentina) JI Londero	0	6^{3}
(Czech Republic) J Mertl (Poland) M Przysiężny	6	5	[6]
(United Kingdom) B Klein (Australia) D Propoggia	4	7	[10]
WC	(Mexico) D Garza (Slovakia) I Klec	2	4
3	(Brazil) M Demoliner (Mexico) MA Reyes-Varela	6	6
(United States) J Jung (United States) M Seeberger	7	3	[10]
WC	(Mexico) Mauricio Astorga (Mexico) L Patiño	5	6	[4]
(United States) R Harrison (United States) D Kudla	5	2
2	(Colombia) N Barrientos (Colombia) E Struvay	7	6

Quarterfinals
1	(United States) A Krajicek (United States) R Ram	7	6
(El Salvador) M Arévalo (France) R Boutillier	5	2
4	(Spain) A Menéndez-Maceiras (Mexico) C Ramírez	3	6	[5]
(United States) K King (South Africa) D O'Brien	6	4	[10]
(United Kingdom) B Klein (Australia) D Propoggia	3	6^{5}
3	(Brazil) M Demoliner (Mexico) MA Reyes-Varela	6	7^{7}
(United States) J Jung (United States) M Seeberger	7^{7}	4	[11]
2	(Colombia) N Barrientos (Colombia) E Struvay	6^{5}	6	[13]

Semifinals
1	(United States) A Krajicek (United States) R Ram	6	6
(United States) K King (South Africa) D O'Brien	1	3
3	(Brazil) M Demoliner (Mexico) MA Reyes-Varela	7^{7}	6
2	(Colombia) N Barrientos (Colombia) E Struvay	6^{5}	4

Final
1	(United States) A Krajicek (United States) R Ram	7	4	[10]
3	(Brazil) M Demoliner (Mexico) MA Reyes-Varela	5	6	[6]
