= 2015 Jalisco Open – Singles =

Singles
- 2015 Jalisco Open

Final
- Champion: (United States) Rajeev Ram
- Runner-up: (United States) Jason Jung
- Score: 6–1, 6–2

Events
Singles	Doubles
- Jalisco Open

Gilles Müller was the defending champion, but he did not participate this year.

Rajeev Ram won the title, defeating Jason Jung in the final, 6–1, 6–2.

== Seeds ==
1. (Spain) Adrián Menéndez Maceiras (quarterfinals)
2. (United States) Austin Krajicek (first round)
3. (United States) Ryan Harrison (first round)
4. (Poland) Michał Przysiężny (second round)
5. (United States) Denis Kudla (first round)
6. (Australia) John-Patrick Smith (quarterfinals)
7. (United States) Rajeev Ram (champion)
8. (United Kingdom) Brydan Klein (first round)

== Draw ==
Key

- Q = Qualifier
- WC = Wild card
- LL = Lucky loser
- Alt = Alternate
- ITF = ITF entry
- PR = Protected ranking
- SR = Special ranking
- SE = Special exempt
- JE = Junior exempt
- JR = Junior Accelerator Programme entrant
- CO = College Accelerator Programme entrant
- NG = Next Gen Accelerator Program entrant
- w/o = Walkover
- r = Retired
- d = Defaulted

=== Finals ===
Semifinals
Q	(United States) Kevin King	4	3
7	(United States) Rajeev Ram	6	6
(United States) Jason Jung	6	7^{7}
(United States) Connor Smith	4	6^{3}

Final
7	(United States) Rajeev Ram	6	6
(United States) Jason Jung	1	2

=== Top half ===
First round
1	(Spain) A Menéndez Maceiras	6	6
(Australia) D Propoggia	2	4
WC	(Mexico) C Ramírez	6	3	6^{3}
WC	(Mexico) D Garza	4	6	7^{7}
Q	(Mexico) L Patiño	6	2	4
Q	(United States) K King	4	6	6
(Barbados) D King	6	6
8	(United Kingdom) B Klein	4	4
4	(Poland) M Przysiężny	7	6^{4}	6
WC	(Mexico) MA Reyes-Varela	5	7^{7}	3
(El Salvador) M Arévalo	6	6
(Slovakia) I Klec	4	1
Q	(Brazil) Henrique Cunha	6	4	6
(Bulgaria) D Kutrovsky	3	6	2
(Colombia) E Struvay	6	2	1
7	(United States) R Ram	4	6	6

Second round
1	(Spain) A Menéndez Maceiras	6	6
WC	(Mexico) D Garza	3	2
Q	(United States) K King	6	3	7^{7}
(Barbados) D King	3	6	6^{2}
4	(Poland) M Przysiężny	4	3
(El Salvador) M Arévalo	6	6
Q	(Brazil) H Cunha	1	1
7	(United States) R Ram	6	6

Quarterfinals
1	(Spain) A Menéndez Maceiras	5	6	6^{2}
Q	(United States) K King	7	2	7^{7}
(El Salvador) M Arévalo	6^{2}	3
7	(United States) R Ram	7^{7}	6

Semifinals
Q	(United States) K King	4	3
7	(United States) R Ram	6	6

=== Bottom half ===
First round
5	(United States) D Kudla	4	5
(France) R Boutillier	6	7
(Ecuador) G Escobar	6	5	5
(United States) J Jung	4	7	7
(United States) A El Mihdawy	6	2	7
WC	(Mexico) L Gómez	3	6	5
(Argentina) JI Londero	7^{7}	6
3	(United States) R Harrison	6^{2}	2
6	(Australia) J-P Smith	6	6
(United States) D Nguyen	1	3
(Colombia) N Barrientos	6	7^{7}
(Czech Republic) J Mertl	3	6^{5}
(United States) Connor Smith	6	6
Q	(Peru) M Echazú	4	1
(Ecuador) G Lapentti	6	6
2	(United States) A Krajicek	2	0

Second round
(France) R Boutillier	3	6^{1}
(United States) J Jung	6	7^{7}
(United States) A El Mihdawy	6	6
(Argentina) JI Londero	1	3
6	(Australia) J-P Smith	7^{7}	6^{5}	7
(Colombia) N Barrientos	6^{2}	7^{7}	5
(United States) C Smith	6	6^{5}	6
(Ecuador) G Lapentti	3	7^{7}	3

Quarterfinals
(United States) J Jung	6	6
(United States) A El Mihdawy	3	4
6	(Australia) J-P Smith	5	4
(United States) C Smith	7	6

Semifinals
(United States) J Jung	6	7^{7}
(United States) C Smith	4	6^{3}
