= 2011 Jalisco Open =

- Date: 20–26 June
- Edition: 1st
- Location: Guadalajara, Mexico

Champions

Singles
- (Chile) Paul Capdeville

Doubles
- (Canada) Vasek Pospisil / (United States) Bobby Reynolds
Jalisco Open	· 2012 →

The 2011 Jalisco Open was a professional tennis tournament played on hard courts. It was the first edition of the tournament which is part of the 2011 ATP Challenger Tour. It took place in Guadalajara, Mexico between 20 and 26 June 2011.

== Singles main-draw entrants ==
=== Seeds ===
Country	Player	Rank^{1}	Seed
BRA	João Souza	129	1
CHI	Paul Capdeville	137	2
USA	Bobby Reynolds	140	3
COL	Carlos Salamanca	191	4
CAN	Vasek Pospisil	212	5
ISR	Amir Weintraub	216	6
THA	Danai Udomchoke	221	7
SVK	Ivo Klec	240	8

- ^{1} Rankings are as of June 13, 2011.

=== Other entrants ===
The following players received wildcards into the singles main draw:

- (Mexico) Miguel Gallardo-Vallés
- (Mexico) Luis Patiño
- (Mexico) Manuel Sánchez
- (Mexico) Júlio César Vázquez

The following players received entry from the qualifying draw:

- (Mexico) Luis Díaz Barriga
- (Colombia) Juan Sebastián Gómez
- (Philippines) Ruben Gonzales
- (Mexico) Miguel Ángel Reyes-Varela

The following players received entry as a lucky loser into the singles main draw:

- (Canada) Pierre-Ludovic Duclos

== Champions ==
=== Singles ===
(Chile) Paul Capdeville def. (Canada) Pierre-Ludovic Duclos, 7–5, 6–1

=== Doubles ===
(Canada) Vasek Pospisil / (United States) Bobby Reynolds def. (Canada) Pierre-Ludovic Duclos / (Slovakia) Ivo Klec, 6–4, 6–7(6), [10–6]
