= 2017 Jalisco Open – Singles =

Singles
- 2017 Jalisco Open

Final
- Champion: (Bosnia and Herzegovina) Mirza Bašić
- Runner-up: (Canada) Denis Shapovalov
- Score: 6–4, 6–4

Events
Singles	Doubles
← 2016 ·	Jalisco Open	· 2018 →

Malek Jaziri was the defending champion but chose not to defend his title.

Mirza Bašić won the title after defeating Denis Shapovalov 6–4, 6–4 in the final.

== Seeds ==
1. (Dominican Republic) Víctor Estrella Burgos (quarterfinals)
2. (Canada) Vasek Pospisil (second round)
3. (United States) Tennys Sandgren (quarterfinals)
4. (Chinese Taipei) Jason Jung (semifinals)
5. (United States) Dennis Novikov (first round)
6. (United States) Noah Rubin (second round)
7. (El Salvador) Marcelo Arévalo (second round)
8. (Australia) Sam Groth (first round)

== Draw ==
=== Key ===
- Q = Qualifier
- WC = Wild card
- LL = Lucky loser
- Alt = Alternate
- SE = Special exempt
- PR = Protected ranking
- ITF = ITF entry
- JE = Junior exempt
- w/o = Walkover
- r = Retired
- d = Defaulted
- SR = Special ranking

=== Finals ===
Semifinals
(Bosnia and Herzegovina) Mirza Bašić	6	6
4	(Chinese Taipei) Jason Jung	3	3
(Poland) Jerzy Janowicz	6	3	6^{4}
(Canada) Denis Shapovalov	4	6	7^{7}

Final
(Bosnia and Herzegovina) Mirza Bašić	6	6
(Canada) Denis Shapovalov	4	4

=== Top half ===
First round
1	(Dominican Republic) V Estrella Burgos	7^{7}	6
Q	(Ecuador) E Gómez	6^{0}	4
WC	(Mexico) L Patiño	0	5
(Egypt) M Safwat	6	7
(Belgium) K Coppejans	6	6
(Netherlands) I Sijsling	3	0
(Bosnia and Herzegovina) M Bašić	6	7
5	(United States) D Novikov	4	5
4	(Chinese Taipei) J Jung	6	7^{10}
WC	(Mexico) H Hach Verdugo	2	6^{8}
(Australia) J-P Smith	6	6
WC	(Mexico) Eduardo Yahir Orozco Rangel	0	0
(United States) M Krueger	7^{7}	6
Q	(United States) A Krajicek	6^{3}	3
Alt	(Brazil) C Zampieri	3	3
7	(El Salvador) M Arévalo	6	6

Second round
1	(Dominican Republic) V Estrella Burgos	4	6	6
(Egypt) M Safwat	6	3	4
(Belgium) K Coppejans	3	3
(Bosnia and Herzegovina) M Bašić	6	6
4	(Chinese Taipei) J Jung	6	7^{10}
(Australia) J-P Smith	4	6^{8}
(United States) M Krueger	6	1	6
7	(El Salvador) M Arévalo	4	6	3

Quarterfinals
1	(Dominican Republic) V Estrella Burgos	3	7^{7}	3
(Bosnia and Herzegovina) M Bašić	6	6^{3}	6
4	(Chinese Taipei) J Jung	6	6
(United States) M Krueger	1	3

Semifinals
(Bosnia and Herzegovina) M Bašić	6	6
4	(Chinese Taipei) J Jung	3	3

=== Bottom half ===
First round
8	(Australia) S Groth	3	7^{7}	1
(Poland) J Janowicz	6	6^{3}	6
(Argentina) F Coria	6	7^{7}
(Serbia) P Krstin	2	6^{4}
(United States) A Sarkissian	6	6
(Chile) N Jarry	4	3
(Kazakhstan) D Popko	5	4
3	(United States) T Sandgren	7	6
6	(United States) N Rubin	7	6^{4}	6
Q	(Australia) A De Minaur	5	7^{7}	4
Q	(United Kingdom) L Glasspool	6	6
Alt	(Spain) A Menéndez-Maceiras	2	4
(Japan) A Santillan	6^{3}	6	3
(Canada) D Shapovalov	7^{7}	4	6
WC	(Mexico) M Sánchez	4	6	4
2	(Canada) V Pospisil	6	4	6

Second round
(Poland) J Janowicz	6	6
(Argentina) F Coria	2	1
(United States) A Sarkissian	4	5
3	(United States) T Sandgren	6	7
6	(United States) N Rubin	5	3
Q	(United Kingdom) L Glasspool	7	6
(Canada) D Shapovalov	6	6
2	(Canada) V Pospisil	3	3

Quarterfinals
(Poland) J Janowicz	6	6
3	(United States) T Sandgren	4	2
Q	(United Kingdom) L Glasspool	6	3	5
(Canada) D Shapovalov	4	6	7

Semifinals
(Poland) J Janowicz	6	3	6^{4}
(Canada) D Shapovalov	4	6	7^{7}
