= 2018 Jalisco Open – Singles =

Singles
- 2018 Jalisco Open

Final
- Champion: (El Salvador) Marcelo Arévalo
- Runner-up: (United States) Christopher Eubanks
- Score: 6–4, 5–7, 7–6^{(7–4)}

Events
Singles	Doubles
- Jalisco Open

Mirza Bašić was the defending champion but chose not to defend his title.

Marcelo Arévalo won the title after defeating Christopher Eubanks 6–4, 5–7, 7–6^{(7–4)} in the final.

== Seeds ==
1. (Spain) Adrián Menéndez Maceiras (second round)
2. (Germany) Mats Moraing (quarterfinals)
3. (United States) Dennis Novikov (first round)
4. (Canada) Filip Peliwo (second round)
5. (United States) Kevin King (first round)
6. (El Salvador) Marcelo Arévalo (champion)
7. (Dominican Republic) Víctor Estrella Burgos (second round)
8. (Barbados) Darian King (quarterfinals)

== Draw ==
Key

- Q = Qualifier
- WC = Wild card
- LL = Lucky loser
- Alt = Alternate
- ITF = ITF entry
- PR = Protected ranking
- SR = Special ranking
- SE = Special exempt
- JE = Junior exempt
- JR = Junior Accelerator Programme entrant
- CO = College Accelerator Programme entrant
- NG = Next Gen Accelerator Program entrant
- w/o = Walkover
- r = Retired
- d = Defaulted

=== Finals ===
Semifinals
(United States) Christopher Eubanks	6	7^{7}
(Serbia) Peđa Krstin	2	6^{5}
6	(El Salvador) Marcelo Arévalo	6	2
(Canada) Brayden Schnur	3	0^{r}

Final
(United States) Christopher Eubanks	4	7	6^{4}
6	(El Salvador) Marcelo Arévalo	6	5	7^{7}

=== Top half ===
First round
1	(Spain) A Menéndez Maceiras	6^{5}	6	7
(Australia) B Mousley	7^{7}	2	5
(Serbia) D Petrović	6	7
WC	(Mexico) T Hank	4	5
WC	(Mexico) G López Villaseñor	1	6	6^{5}
(United States) C Eubanks	6	3	7^{7}
(Bosnia and Herzegovina) A Šetkić	4	2
7	(Dominican Republic) V Estrella Burgos	6	6
3	(United States) D Novikov	6^{3}	3
(Serbia) P Krstin	7^{7}	6
Q	(United Kingdom) J Ward	4	7^{10}	3
WC	(Mexico) M Sánchez	6	6^{8}	6
Alt	(Croatia) A Pavić	7	5	6
(Israel) E Leshem	5	7	3
(Ecuador) R Quiroz	6	3	3
8	(Barbados) D King	3	6	6

Second round
1	(Spain) A Menéndez Maceiras	2	5
(Serbia) D Petrović	6	7
(United States) C Eubanks	7^{7}	7^{8}
7	(Dominican Republic) V Estrella Burgos	6^{5}	6^{6}
(Serbia) P Krstin	6	6
WC	(Mexico) M Sánchez	3	1
Alt	(Croatia) A Pavić	3	6	4
8	(Barbados) D King	6	2	6

Quarterfinals
(Serbia) D Petrović	4	4
(United States) C Eubanks	6	6
(Serbia) P Krstin	6	1	6
8	(Barbados) D King	2	6	2

Semifinals
(United States) C Eubanks	6	7^{7}
(Serbia) P Krstin	2	6^{5}

=== Bottom half ===
First round
6	(El Salvador) M Arévalo	6	6
Q	(Italy) F Gaio	1	4
(Belgium) Christopher Heyman	4	6^{5}
(United States) A Sarkissian	6	7^{7}
(Australia) J-P Smith	6	6^{5}	6
(Colombia) DE Galán	2	7^{7}	1
WC	(Mexico) L Patiño	4	6^{7}
4	(Canada) F Peliwo	6	7^{9}
5	(United States) K King	6	3	3
(Canada) B Schnur	2	6	6
(Colombia) S Giraldo	6	3	1^{r}
Alt	(Dominican Republic) J Hernández-Fernández	2	6	4
Q	(Brazil) J Souza	6	3	5
Q	(Ecuador) G Escobar	2	6	7
(Spain) B Zapata Miralles	1	6^{1}
2	(Germany) M Moraing	6	7^{7}

Second round
6	(El Salvador) M Arévalo	6	6
(United States) A Sarkissian	3	3
(Australia) J-P Smith	3	6	6
4	(Canada) F Peliwo	6	1	2
(Canada) B Schnur	7	4	7^{7}
Alt	(Dominican Republic) J Hernández-Fernández	5	6	6^{5}
Q	(Ecuador) G Escobar	6	5	2
2	(Germany) M Moraing	2	7	6

Quarterfinals
6	(El Salvador) M Arévalo	7^{7}	3	6
(Australia) J-P Smith	6^{4}	6	3
(Canada) B Schnur	6	7^{7}
2	(Germany) M Moraing	3	6^{4}

Semifinals
6	(El Salvador) M Arévalo	6	2
(Canada) B Schnur	3	0^{r}
