= 2017 Jalisco Open =

- Date: 21–26 March
- Edition: 7th
- Draw: 32S / 16D
- Prize money: $50,000+H
- Surface: Hard
- Location: Guadalajara, Mexico

Champions

Singles
- (Bosnia and Herzegovina) Mirza Bašić

Doubles
- (Mexico) Santiago González / (New Zealand) Artem Sitak
← 2016 ·	Jalisco Open	· 2018 →

The 2017 Jalisco Open will be a professional tennis tournament played on hard courts. It will be the seventh edition of the tournament which will be part of the 2017 ATP Challenger Tour. It will take place in Guadalajara, Mexico between 21 and 26 March 2017.

== Singles main-draw entrants ==
=== Seeds ===
Country	Player	Rank^{1}	Seed
DOM	Víctor Estrella Burgos	91	1
CAN	Vasek Pospisil	129	2
USA	Tennys Sandgren	166	3
TPE	Jason Jung	170	4
USA	Dennis Novikov	173	5
USA	Noah Rubin	177	6
ESA	Marcelo Arévalo	184	7
AUS	Sam Groth	187	8

- ^{1} Rankings as of March 6, 2017.

=== Other entrants ===
The following players received wildcards into the singles main draw:

- (Mexico) Hans Hach Verdugo
- (Mexico) Eduardo Yahir Orozco Rangel
- (Mexico) Luis Patiño
- (Mexico) Manuel Sánchez

The following players received entry into the singles main draw as alternates:

- (Spain) Adrián Menéndez Maceiras
- (Brazil) Caio Zampieri

The following players received entry from the qualifying draw:

- (Australia) Alex De Minaur
- (United Kingdom) Lloyd Glasspool
- (Ecuador) Emilio Gómez
- (United States) Austin Krajicek

== Champions ==
=== Singles ===
- (Bosnia and Herzegovina) Mirza Bašić def. (Canada) Denis Shapovalov 6–4, 6–4.

=== Doubles ===
- (Mexico) Santiago González / (New Zealand) Artem Sitak def. (Australia) Luke Saville / (Australia) John-Patrick Smith 6–3, 1–6, [10–5].
