= 2016 Jalisco Open =

- Date: 14–20 March
- Edition: 6th
- Draw: 32S / 16D
- Prize money: $100,000+H
- Surface: Hard
- Location: Guadalajara, Mexico

Champions

Singles
- (Tunisia) Malek Jaziri

Doubles
- (Germany) Gero Kretschmer / (Germany) Alexander Satschko
← 2015 ·	Jalisco Open	· 2017 →

The 2016 Jalisco Open was a professional tennis tournament played on hard courts. It was the sixth edition of the tournament which was part of the 2016 ATP Challenger Tour. It took place in Guadalajara, Mexico between 14 and 20 March 2016.

== Singles main-draw entrants ==
=== Seeds ===
Country	Player	Rank^{1}	Seed
DOM	Víctor Estrella Burgos	67	1
FRA	Lucas Pouille	87	2
BIH	Damir Džumhur	93	3
ESP	Roberto Carballés Baena	107	4
TUN	Malek Jaziri	108	5
ARG	Horacio Zeballos	113	6
COL	Alejandro Falla	129	7
GER	Daniel Brands	130	8

- ^{1} Rankings as of March 7, 2016.

=== Other entrants ===
The following players received wildcards into the singles main draw:

- (Mexico) Manuel Sánchez
- (Mexico) Lucas Gómez
- (Mexico) Hans Hach Verdugo
- (Mexico) Tigre Hank

The following players received entry into the singles main draw as special exempt:

- (Serbia) Peđa Krstin
- (Colombia) Eduardo Struvay

The following players entered the singles main draw as alternates:

- (Spain) Oriol Roca Batalla
- (Spain) Jordi Samper-Montaña

The following players received entry from the qualifying draw:

- (United States) Ernesto Escobedo
- (El Salvador) Marcelo Arévalo
- (Australia) Marinko Matosevic
- (Colombia) Daniel Elahi Galán

== Champions ==
=== Singles ===
- (Tunisia) Malek Jaziri def. (France) Stéphane Robert, 5–7, 6–3, 7–6^{(7–5)}

=== Doubles ===
- (Germany) Gero Kretschmer / (Germany) Alexander Satschko def. (Mexico) Santiago González / (Croatia) Mate Pavić, 6–3, 4–6, [10–2]
