= 2013 Jalisco Open =

- Date: 8–14 April
- Edition: 3rd
- Draw: 32S / 16D
- Prize money: $100,000
- Surface: Hard
- Location: Guadalajara, Mexico

Champions

Singles
- (Russia) Alex Bogomolov Jr.

Doubles
- (Croatia) Marin Draganja / (Croatia) Mate Pavić
← 2012 ·	Jalisco Open	· 2014 →

The 2013 Jalisco Open was a professional tennis tournament played on hard courts. It was the third edition of the tournament which was part of the 2013 ATP Challenger Tour. It took place in Guadalajara, Mexico between 8 and 14 April 2013.

== Singles main-draw entrants ==
=== Seeds ===
Country	Player	Rank^{1}	Seed
TPE	Lu Yen-hsun	74	1
GER	Benjamin Becker	95	2
USA	Rajeev Ram	107	3
ISR	Dudi Sela	115	4
FRA	Adrian Mannarino	122	5
AUS	John Millman	126	6
ESP	Daniel Muñoz de la Nava	129	7
RUS	Alex Bogomolov Jr.	132	8

- ^{1} Rankings are as of April 1, 2013.

=== Other entrants ===
The following players received wildcards into the singles main draw:

- (Mexico) Miguel Gallardo Valles
- (Chile) Nicolás Massú
- (Mexico) Eduardo Peralta-Tello
- (Mexico) Miguel Ángel Reyes-Varela

The following players received entry from the qualifying draw:

- (Croatia) Marin Draganja
- (Austria) Maximilian Neuchrist
- (Japan) Bumpei Sato
- (Germany) Peter Torebko

== Doubles main-draw entrants ==
=== Seeds ===
Country	Player	Country	Player	Rank^{1}	Seed
THA	Sanchai Ratiwatana	THA	Sonchat Ratiwatana	156	1
USA	James Cerretani	CAN	Adil Shamasdin	166	2
GER	Benjamin Becker	USA	Rajeev Ram	187	3
AUS	Samuel Groth	AUS	John-Patrick Smith	222	4

- ^{1} Rankings as of April 1, 2013.

=== Other entrants ===
The following pairs received wildcards into the doubles main draw:

- (Chile) Nicolás Massú / (Mexico) Miguel Ángel Reyes-Varela
- (Mexico) Alejandro Moreno Figueroa / (Mexico) Manuel Sánchez

== Champions ==
=== Singles ===
- (Russia) Alex Bogomolov Jr. def. (United States) Rajeev Ram, 2–6, 6–3, 6–1

=== Doubles ===
- (Croatia) Marin Draganja / (Croatia) Mate Pavić def. (Australia) Samuel Groth / (Australia) John-Patrick Smith, 5–7, 6–2, [13–11]
