= 2017 Jalisco Open – Doubles =

Doubles
- 2017 Jalisco Open

Final
- Champions: (Mexico) Santiago González (New Zealand) Artem Sitak
- Runners-up: (Australia) Luke Saville (Australia) John-Patrick Smith
- Score: 6–3, 1–6, [10–5]

Events
Singles	Doubles
- Jalisco Open

Gero Kretschmer and Alexander Satschko were the defending champions but chose not to defend their title.

Santiago González and Artem Sitak won the title after defeating Luke Saville and John-Patrick Smith 6–3, 1–6, [10–5] in the final.

== Seeds ==
1. (Australia) Sam Groth / (Canada) Adil Shamasdin (first round)
2. (Mexico) Santiago González / (New Zealand) Artem Sitak (champions)
3. (Sweden) Johan Brunström / (Sweden) Andreas Siljeström (semifinals)
4. (Australia) Luke Saville / (Australia) John-Patrick Smith (final)

== Draw ==
Key

- Q = Qualifier
- WC = Wild card
- LL = Lucky loser
- Alt = Alternate
- ITF = ITF entry
- PR = Protected ranking
- SR = Special ranking
- SE = Special exempt
- JE = Junior exempt
- JR = Junior Accelerator Programme entrant
- CO = College Accelerator Programme entrant
- NG = Next Gen Accelerator Program entrant
- w/o = Walkover
- r = Retired
- d = Defaulted

First round
1	(Australia) S Groth (Canada) A Shamasdin	5	3
(Chinese Taipei) J Jung (United States) D Novikov	7	6
WC	(Mexico) C Ramírez (Mexico) M Sánchez	4	7^{7}	[5]^{r}
(Uruguay) A Behar (Ecuador) G Escobar	6	6^{5}	[9]
4	(Australia) L Saville (Australia) J-P Smith	7	6
(Dominican Republic) V Estrella Burgos (Brazil) C Zampieri	5	2
WC	(Mexico) H Hach Verdugo (Mexico) L Patiño	2	4
(Bosnia and Herzegovina) M Bašić (Germany) K Krawietz	6	6
(Australia) Jarryd Chaplin (New Zealand) B McLachlan	6	7^{7}
(El Salvador) M Arévalo (Brazil) F Neis	3	6^{3}
(United States) A Krajicek (United States) J Withrow	6^{4}	6	[8]
3	(Sweden) J Brunström (Sweden) A Siljeström	7^{7}	2	[10]
WC	(Mexico) Carlos Ramírez Utermann (Mexico) Mauricio Reséndiz	3	3
(Switzerland) L Margaroli (Egypt) M Safwat	6	6
(Italy) R Ghedin (Germany) A Mies	6	2	[6]
2	(Mexico) S González (New Zealand) A Sitak	2	6	[10]

Quarterfinals
(Chinese Taipei) J Jung (United States) D Novikov	3	2
(Uruguay) A Behar (Ecuador) G Escobar	6	6
4	(Australia) L Saville (Australia) J-P Smith	4	7^{10}	[10]
(Bosnia and Herzegovina) M Bašić (Germany) K Krawietz	6	6^{8}	[4]
(Australia) J Chaplin (New Zealand) B McLachlan	4	4
3	(Sweden) J Brunström (Sweden) A Siljeström	6	6
(Switzerland) L Margaroli (Egypt) M Safwat	1	6^{5}
2	(Mexico) S González (New Zealand) A Sitak	6	7^{7}

Semifinals
(Uruguay) A Behar (Ecuador) G Escobar	4	3
4	(Australia) L Saville (Australia) J-P Smith	6	6
3	(Sweden) J Brunström (Sweden) A Siljeström	3	6	[2]
2	(Mexico) S González (New Zealand) A Sitak	6	4	[10]

Final
4	(Australia) L Saville (Australia) J-P Smith	3	6	[5]
2	(Mexico) S González (New Zealand) A Sitak	6	1	[10]
