= 2018 Jalisco Open =

- Date: 16–22 April
- Edition: 8th
- Draw: 32S / 16D
- Surface: Hard
- Location: Guadalajara, Mexico

Champions

Singles
- (El Salvador) Marcelo Arévalo

Doubles
- (El Salvador) Marcelo Arévalo / (Mexico) Miguel Ángel Reyes-Varela
- Jalisco Open

The 2018 Jalisco Open was a professional tennis tournament played on hard courts. It was the eighth edition of the tournament which was part of the 2018 ATP Challenger Tour. It took place in Guadalajara, Mexico between 16 and 22 April 2018.

== Singles main-draw entrants ==
=== Seeds ===
Country	Player	Rank^{1}	Seed
ESP	Adrián Menéndez Maceiras	141	1
GER	Mats Moraing	156	2
USA	Dennis Novikov	167	3
CAN	Filip Peliwo	169	4
USA	Kevin King	171	5
ESA	Marcelo Arévalo	174	6
DOM	Víctor Estrella Burgos	177	7
BAR	Darian King	183	8

- ^{1} Rankings as of April 9, 2018.

=== Other entrants ===
The following players received wildcards into the singles main draw:

- (Mexico) Tigre Hank
- (Mexico) Gerardo López Villaseñor
- (Mexico) Luis Patiño
- (Mexico) Manuel Sánchez

The following players received entry into the singles main draw as alternates:

- (Dominican Republic) José Hernández-Fernández
- (Croatia) Ante Pavić

The following players received entry from the qualifying draw:

- (Ecuador) Gonzalo Escobar
- (Italy) Federico Gaio
- (Brazil) João Souza
- (United Kingdom) James Ward

== Champions ==
=== Singles ===
- (El Salvador) Marcelo Arévalo def. (United States) Christopher Eubanks 6–4, 5–7, 7–6^{(7–4)}.

=== Doubles ===
- (El Salvador) Marcelo Arévalo / (Mexico) Miguel Ángel Reyes-Varela def. (United Kingdom) Brydan Klein / (South Africa) Ruan Roelofse 7–6^{(7–3)}, 7–5.
