= Ivo Klec =

Slovak tennis player

- Country (sports): Slovakia
- Residence: Bratislava, Slovakia
- Born: 28 November 1980 (age 45) Bratislava, Slovakia, Czechoslovakia
- Height: 1.82 m (6 ft 0 in)
- Turned pro: 1999
- Retired: 2018
- Plays: Right-handed
- Prize money: US$421,823

Singles
- Career record: 2–7
- Career titles: 0
- Highest ranking: No. 184 (21 August 2006)

Grand Slam singles results
- Australian Open: Q2 (2008)
- French Open: Q2 (2007, 2008)
- Wimbledon: Q2 (2007)
- US Open: Q1 (2008, 2011)

Doubles
- Career record: 0–1
- Career titles: 0
- Highest ranking: No. 190 (13 June 2011)
- Last updated on: 2 October 2018.

Ivo Klec (born 28 November 1980) is a Slovak former tennis player. He played mainly on the ATP Challenger Tour. On the ITF Futures circuit, he has claimed 29 titles, 14 singles and 15 doubles. In addition, he has also won two ATP Challenger doubles titles.

During his career, he was suspended for 2 years on corruption charges. He subsequently did not work with the ITIA's investigation.

== Singles titles ==
Legend (singles)
Grand Slam (0)
Tennis Masters Cup (0)
ATP Masters Series (0)
ATP Tour (0)
Challengers (0)
Futures (14)

No.	Date	Tournament	Surface	Opponent in the final	Score
1.	21 April 2003	ITF Mishref, Kuwait	Hard	(Kuwait) Mohammed Ghareeb	3–6, 6–4, 6–4
2.	28 April 2003	ITF Mishref, Kuwait	Hard	(Romania) Florin Mergea	3–6, 6–3, 6–4
3.	5 May 2003	ITF Mishref, Kuwait	Hard	(Romania) Florin Mergea	6–4, 6–4
4.	16 August 2004	ITF Enschede, Netherlands	Clay	(Belgium) Jeroen Masson	6–3, 6–1
5.	28 March 2005	ITF Rabat, Morocco	Clay	(Poland) Adam Chadaj	6–4, 6–7^{(4–7)}, 6–4
6.	14 November 2005	ITF Gran Canaria, Spain	Clay	(Portugal) Rui Machado	6–3, 6–3
7.	13 July 2009	ITF Damascus, Syria	Hard	(Australia) Sadik Kadir	6–0, 6–1
8.	3 August 2009	ITF Ottershaw, UK	Hard	(United Kingdom) Morgan Phillips	6–4, 6–3
9.	30 March 2010	ITF Mobile, US	Hard	(United States) Greg Ouellette	6–1, 6–4
10.	24 November 2010	ITF Khartoum, Sudan	Clay	(Bosnia and Herzegovina) Aldin Šetkić	6–2, 6–2
11.	1 December 2010	ITF Khartoum, Sudan	Clay	(Bosnia and Herzegovina) Aldin Šetkić	6–3, 7–5
12.	27 September 2013	ITF Mishref, Kuwait	Hard	(United Kingdom) Marcus Willis	3–6, 6–1, 6–4
13.	21 December 2013	ITF Doha, Qatar	Hard	(Netherlands) Niels Lootsma	6–1, 4–6, 6–3
14.	20 December 2014	ITF Lomé, Togo	Hard	(Spain) Jaime Pulgar García	2–6, 7–6^{(7–4)}, 6–2
