= César Ramírez (tennis) =

Mexican tennis player (born 1990)

- Country (sports): Mexico
- Born: January 25, 1990 (age 36) Veracruz, Mexico
- Height: 1.89 m (6 ft 2 1/2 in)
- Plays: Right-handed (two-handed backhand)
- Prize money: $ 141,642

Singles
- Career record: 8–12 (ATP Tour level, Grand Slam level, and Davis Cup)
- Career titles: 0
- Highest ranking: No. 391 (10 September 2012)

Grand Slam singles results
- US Open Junior: 2R (2008)

Doubles
- Career record: 7–11 (ATP Tour level, Grand Slam level, and Davis Cup)
- Career titles: 0
- Highest ranking: No. 105 (16 February 2015)
Medal record
Representing Mexico
Men's tennis
Central American and Caribbean Games
Silver medal – second place	2014 Veracruz	Doubles
- Last updated on: 24 May 2021.

César Ramírez (Latin American Spanish: [ˈsesaɾ raˈmiɾes]; born January 25, 1990) nicknamed "el Tiburón" ("the Shark"), is a tennis player from Mexico. He played for the Mexican Davis Cup squad in 2012.

Ramírez tested positive for steroids and has been suspended from competition for four years, until 12 April 2022.

== ATP Challenger and ITF Futures finals ==
=== Singles: 14 (8–6) ===
Legend ATP Challenger (0–0) ITF Futures (8–6)	Finals by surface Hard (5–4) Clay (3–2) Grass (0–0) Carpet (0–0)

Result	W–L	Date	Tournament	Tier	Surface	Opponent	Score
Win	1–0	Oct 2008	Mexico F13, Ciudad Obregón	Futures	Hard	(France) Fabrice Martin	6–2, 6–4
Win	2–0	May 2009	Mexico F4, Coatzacoalcos	Futures	Hard	(Mexico) Bruno Echagaray	6–3, 5–7, 6–2
Loss	2–1	May 2009	Mexico F5, Puerto Vallarta	Futures	Hard	(Italy) Luigi D'Agord	7–5, 2–6, 3–6
Loss	2–2	Nov 2009	Mexico F14, Guadalajara	Futures	Clay	(Canada) Vasek Pospisil	2–6, 2–6
Win	3–2	Feb 2010	Panama F1, Panama City	Futures	Clay	(Ecuador) Julio César Campozano	2–6, 6–3, 7–5
Loss	3–3	Aug 2010	Mexico F5, Zacatecas	Futures	Hard	(United Kingdom) David Rice	3–6, 4–6
Loss	3–4	Nov 2010	Mexico F8, Guadalajara	Futures	Clay	(Moldova) Roman Borvanov	1–6, 4–6
Loss	3–5	Nov 2010	Mexico F10, Colima	Futures	Hard	(United States) James Ludlow	6–7^{(4–7)}, 4–6
Win	4–5	Sep 2011	Mexico F10, Zacatecas	Futures	Hard	(Bulgaria) Boris Nicola Bakalov	6–3, 6–3
Win	5–5	Dec 2011	Mexico F16, Guadalajara	Futures	Clay	(Colombia) Nicolás Barrientos	6–2, 6–1
Win	6–5	Apr 2012	Mexico F4, Mexico City	Futures	Hard	(Mexico) Víctor Romero	6–2, 6–4
Loss	6–6	Jul 2012	USA F21, Godfrey	Futures	Hard	(United States) Jason Jung	6–2, 5–7, 2–6
Win	7–6	Aug 2012	Colombia F2, Medellín	Futures	Clay	(Colombia) Michael Quintero	walkover
Win	8–6	Oct 2013	Mexico F15, Quintana Roo	Futures	Hard	(Colombia) Michael Quintero	6–1, 6–1

=== Doubles: 29 (18–11) ===
Legend ATP Challenger (2–4) ITF Futures (16–7)	Finals by surface Hard (14–5) Clay (4–5) Grass (0–0) Carpet (0–1)

Result	W–L	Date	Tournament	Tier	Surface	Partner	Opponents	Score
Loss	0–1	Oct 2008	Mexico F11, Torreón	Futures	Hard	(Mexico) Juan Manuel Elizondo	(United States) Matthew Roberts (Mexico) Antonio Ruiz-Rosales	5–7, 4–6
Loss	0–2	Nov 2008	Mexico F14, Ciudad Obregón	Futures	Hard	(Mexico) Juan Manuel Elizondo	(Italy) Claudio Grassi (Mexico) Antonio Ruiz-Rosales	4–6, 6–7^{(3–7)}
Loss	0–3	Nov 2008	Mexico F15, Guadalajara	Futures	Clay	(Mexico) Juan Manuel Elizondo	(Mexico) Bruno Rodríguez (Mexico) Víctor Romero	6–4, 2–6, [8–10]
Win	1–3	May 2009	Mexico F3, Córdoba	Futures	Hard	(Mexico) Juan Manuel Elizondo	(Mexico) Carlos Palencia (Mexico) Santiago González	6–4, 5–7, [12–10]
Loss	1–4	May 2009	Mexico F5, Puerto Vallarta	Futures	Hard	(Mexico) Juan Manuel Elizondo	(Canada) Adil Shamasdin (Canada) Vasek Pospisil	1–6, 6–2, [7–10]
Win	2–4	Jun 2009	Mexico F8, León	Futures	Hard	(Mexico) Juan Manuel Elizondo	(Mexico) Manuel Sánchez (Mexico) German Sanchez Delfin	6–4, 7–6^{(7–3)}
Loss	2–5	Oct 2009	France F16, Sarreguemines	Futures	Carpet	(Serbia) Vladimir Obradović	(Netherlands Antilles) Martijn van Haasteren (Netherlands) Michel Koning	4–6, 4–6
Win	3–5	Nov 2009	Mexico F15, Puerto Vallarta	Futures	Hard	(Mexico) Javier Herrera-Eguiluz	(Australia) Nima Roshan (Moldova) Roman Borvanov	6–3, 6–4
Win	4–5	May 2010	Mexico F3, Mexico City	Futures	Hard	(Australia) Nima Roshan	(United States) Conor Pollock (United States) Brett Joelson	6–3, 3–6, [14–12]
Win	5–5	Aug 2010	Mexico F5, Zacatecas	Futures	Hard	(Mexico) Juan Manuel Elizondo	(Guatemala) Christopher Díaz Figueroa (Mexico) Bruno Rodríguez	6–4, 6–7^{(2–7)}, [10–4]
Win	6–5	Sep 2010	Mexico F6, León	Futures	Hard	(Mexico) Juan Manuel Elizondo	(Australia) Nima Roshan (Canada) Vasek Pospisil	6–3, 4–6, [10–6]
Loss	6–6	Nov 2010	Cancún, Mexico	Challenger	Clay	(Austria) Rainer Eitzinger	(Mexico) Santiago González (Dominican Republic) Víctor Estrella Burgos	1–6, 6–7^{(3–7)}
Loss	6–7	Jul 2011	Italy F19, Fano	Futures	Clay	(Australia) Nima Roshan	(Italy) Luca Vanni (Italy) Stefano Ianni	7–6^{(7–2)}, 3–6, [6–10]
Win	7–7	Sep 2011	Mexico F10, Zacatecas	Futures	Hard	(El Salvador) Marcelo Arévalo	(Guatemala) Christopher Díaz Figueroa (Guatemala) Sebastien Vidal	6–3, 6–2
Loss	7–8	Dec 2011	Mexico F14, Ixtapa	Futures	Hard	(Australia) Nima Roshan	(Mexico) Luis Díaz Barriga (United States) Adam El Mihdawy	4–6, 4–6
Win	8–8	Dec 2011	Mexico F15, Tehuacán	Futures	Hard	(Australia) Nima Roshan	(Mexico) Daniel Garza (Mexico) Raul-Isaias Rosas-Zarur	6–3, 6–1
Win	9–8	Feb 2012	Panama F1, Panama City	Futures	Clay	(El Salvador) Marcelo Arévalo	(Guatemala) Christopher Díaz Figueroa (Guatemala) Sebastien Vidal	6–1, 6–4
Loss	9–9	Apr 2012	Leon, Mexico	Challenger	Hard	(Mexico) Bruno Rodríguez	(Australia) John-Patrick Smith (Australia) John Peers	3–6, 3–6
Win	10–9	Aug 2012	Colombia F1, Bogotá	Futures	Clay	(Peru) Mauricio Echazú	(Colombia) Michael Quintero (Dominican Republic) Víctor Estrella Burgos	6–4, 7–5
Win	11–9	Oct 2013	Mexico F13, Veracruz	Futures	Hard	(Puerto Rico) Alex Llompart	(Colombia) Juan Carlos Spir (South Africa) Dean O'Brien	6–4, 3–6, [10–5]
Win	12–9	Oct 2013	Mexico F15, Quintana Roo	Futures	Hard	(Japan) Kaichi Uchida	(Puerto Rico) Alex Llompart (New Zealand) Finn Tearney	7–6^{(7–5)}, 6–4
Win	13–9	Mar 2014	Guadalajara, Mexico	Challenger	Hard	(Mexico) Miguel Ángel Reyes-Varela	(Australia) Matthew Ebden (Germany) Andre Begemann	6–4, 6–2
Win	14–9	Apr 2014	Mexico F1, Querétaro	Futures	Hard	(Mexico) Miguel Ángel Reyes-Varela	(South Africa) Dean O'Brien (United States) Kevin King	6–3, 7–5
Win	15–9	May 2014	Mexico F2, Córdoba	Futures	Hard	(Mexico) Miguel Ángel Reyes-Varela	(South Africa) Dean O'Brien (United States) Kevin King	7–6^{(7–1)}, 6–1
Win	16–9	May 2014	Mexico F4, Morelia	Futures	Hard	(Mexico) Miguel Ángel Reyes-Varela	(Peru) Mauricio Echazú (Peru) Jorge Brian Panta	7–6^{(7–3)}, 6–3
Win	17–9	Aug 2014	Colombia F3, Medellín	Futures	Clay	(El Salvador) Marcelo Arévalo	(Argentina) Facundo Mena (United States) Cătălin Gârd	6–4, 6–4
Win	18–9	Sep 2014	Medellín, Colombia	Challenger	Clay	(United States) Austin Krajicek	(Venezuela) Roberto Maytín (Argentina) Andrés Molteni	6–3, 7–5
Loss	18–10	Oct 2014	Cali, Colombia	Challenger	Clay	(Colombia) Alejandro González	(Argentina) Guido Andreozzi (Argentina) Guillermo Durán	3–6, 4–6
Loss	18–11	Jul 2015	San Benedetto, Italy	Challenger	Clay	(Mexico) Miguel Ángel Reyes-Varela	(Croatia) Antonio Šančić (Croatia) Dino Marcan	3–6, 7–6^{(12–10)}, [10–12]

== Junior Grand Slam finals ==
=== Doubles: 1 (1 runner-up) ===
Result	Year	Tournament	Surface	Partner	Opponents	Score
Loss	2008	Australian Open	Hard	(Canada) Vasek Pospisil	(Chinese Taipei) Hsieh Cheng-peng (Chinese Taipei) Yang Tsung-hua	6–3, 5–7, [5–10]
