= Jalisco Open =

- 2018 Jalisco Open

Defunct tennis tournament
- Location: Zapopan, Guadalajara, Mexico
- Venue: Centro Panamericano de Tenis
- Category: ATP Challenger Tour
- Surface: Hard / Outdoors
- Draw: 32S/32Q/16D
- Prize money: $50,000+H

The Jalisco Open (also known as Zurich Jalisco Open presentado por Aeromexico y Lacoste for sponsorship reasons) was a tennis tournament held in Zapopan, Guadalajara Metropolitan Area, Mexico since 2011. The event was part of the ATP Challenger Tour and was played on outdoor hardcourt at the Centro Panamericano de Tenis.

== Past finals ==
=== Singles ===
Year	Champion	Runner-up	Score
2018	(El Salvador) Marcelo Arévalo	(United States) Christopher Eubanks	6–4, 5–7, 7–6^{(7–4)}
2017	(Bosnia and Herzegovina) Mirza Bašić	(Canada) Denis Shapovalov	6–4, 6–4
2016	(Tunisia) Malek Jaziri	(France) Stéphane Robert	5–7, 6–3, 7–6^{(7–5)}
2015	(United States) Rajeev Ram	(United States) Jason Jung	6–1, 6–2
2014	(Luxembourg) Gilles Müller	(United States) Denis Kudla	6–2, 6–2
2013	(Russia) Alex Bogomolov Jr.	(United States) Rajeev Ram	2–6, 6–3, 6–1
2012	(Brazil) Thiago Alves	(Italy) Paolo Lorenzi	6–3, 7–6^{(6–4)}
2011	(Chile) Paul Capdeville	(Canada) Pierre-Ludovic Duclos	7–5, 6–1

=== Doubles ===
Year	Champions	Runners-up	Score
2018	(El Salvador) Marcelo Arévalo (Mexico) Miguel Ángel Reyes-Varela	(United Kingdom) Brydan Klein (South Africa) Ruan Roelofse	7–6^{(7–3)}, 7–5
2017	(Mexico) Santiago González (New Zealand) Artem Sitak	(Australia) Luke Saville (Australia) John-Patrick Smith	6–3, 1–6, [10–5]
2016	(Germany) Gero Kretschmer (Germany) Alexander Satschko	(Mexico) Santiago González (Croatia) Mate Pavić	6–3, 4–6, [10–2]
2015	(United States) Austin Krajicek (United States) Rajeev Ram	(Brazil) Marcelo Demoliner (Mexico) Miguel Ángel Reyes-Varela	7–5, 4–6, [10–6]
2014	(Mexico) César Ramírez (Mexico) Miguel Ángel Reyes-Varela	(Germany) Andre Begemann (Australia) Matthew Ebden	6–4, 6–2
2013	(Croatia) Marin Draganja (Croatia) Mate Pavić	(Australia) Samuel Groth (Australia) John-Patrick Smith	5–7, 6–2, [13–11]
2012	(United States) James Cerretani (Canada) Adil Shamasdin	(Poland) Tomasz Bednarek (France) Olivier Charroin	7–6^{(7–5)}, 6–1
2011	(Canada) Vasek Pospisil (United States) Bobby Reynolds	(Canada) Pierre-Ludovic Duclos (Slovakia) Ivo Klec	6–4, 6–7^{(6–8)}, [10–6]
