= 2023 Morelos Open – Singles =

Singles
- 2023 Morelos Open

Final
- Champion: (Argentina) Thiago Agustín Tirante
- Runner-up: (Australia) James Duckworth
- Score: 7–5, 6–0

Events
Singles	Doubles
← 2022 ·	Morelos Open	· 2024 →

Jay Clarke was the defending champion but lost in the second round to Térence Atmane.

Thiago Agustín Tirante won the title after defeating James Duckworth 7–5, 6–0 in the final.

== Seeds ==
1. (Australia) James Duckworth (final)
2. (Switzerland) Antoine Bellier (first round)
3. (Argentina) Thiago Agustín Tirante (champion)
4. (Austria) Maximilian Neuchrist (second round)
5. (France) Antoine Escoffier (quarterfinals)
6. (Argentina) Renzo Olivo (first round)
7. (Canada) Alexis Galarneau (first round)
8. (Argentina) Juan Pablo Ficovich (quarterfinals)

== Draw ==
Key

- Q = Qualifier
- WC = Wild card
- LL = Lucky loser
- Alt = Alternate
- ITF = ITF entry
- PR = Protected ranking
- SR = Special ranking
- SE = Special exempt
- JE = Junior exempt
- JR = Junior Accelerator Programme entrant
- CO = College Accelerator Programme entrant
- NG = Next Gen Accelerator Program entrant
- w/o = Walkover
- r = Retired
- d = Defaulted

=== Finals ===
Semifinals
1	(Australia) James Duckworth	6	7
Q	(United States) Christian Langmo	3	5
3	(Argentina) Thiago Agustín Tirante	6	6
Q	(Estonia) Mark Lajal	2	3

Final
1	(Australia) James Duckworth	5	0
3	(Argentina) Thiago Agustín Tirante	7	6

=== Top half ===
First round
1	(Australia) J Duckworth	6	6
WC	(Australia) B Tomic	2	2
(Colombia) N Mejía	6^{4}	6	3
(United States) O Crawford	7^{7}	3	6
(Ukraine) V Sachko	6	6
Q	(Argentina) MF Descotte	2	1
(Czech Republic) D Palán	6	1	6
6	(Argentina) R Olivo	4	6	3
4	(Austria) M Neuchrist	7	6
Q	(Australia) L Saville	5	4
Q	(United States) Christian Langmo	7^{11}	6
(Brazil) JL Reis da Silva	6^{9}	2
(China) Y Bu	6	6
(Tunisia) A Dougaz	3	3
Alt	(Kazakhstan) B Zhukayev	4	4
5	(France) A Escoffier	6	6

Second round
1	(Australia) J Duckworth	3	7^{7}	6
(United States) O Crawford	6	6^{3}	2
(Ukraine) V Sachko	6	6
(Czech Republic) D Palán	3	2
4	(Austria) M Neuchrist	6	6^{5}	3
Q	(United States) C Langmo	3	7^{7}	6
(China) Y Bu	6	5	3
5	(France) A Escoffier	4	7	6

Quarterfinals
1	(Australia) J Duckworth	2	7^{7}	7
(Ukraine) V Sachko	6	6^{0}	5
Q	(United States) C Langmo	6	5	7
5	(France) A Escoffier	4	7	5

Semifinals
1	(Australia) J Duckworth	6	7
Q	(United States) C Langmo	3	5

=== Bottom half ===
First round
8	(Argentina) JP Ficovich	7^{7}	6^{4}	6
Q	(Romania) M Copil	6^{3}	7^{7}	3
(Australia) A Walton	4	6	1
WC	(Mexico) R Pacheco Méndez	6	3	6
(Germany) Elmar Ejupovic	4	6	3
(United States) E Zhu	6	4	6
(Tunisia) S Mansouri	0	3
3	(Argentina) TA Tirante	6	6
7	(Canada) A Galarneau	6^{1}	6^{5}
Q	(Estonia) M Lajal	7^{7}	7^{7}
Q	(Japan) N Nakagawa	6^{1}	6	2
(Kazakhstan) D Yevseyev	7^{7}	4	6
(France) T Atmane	5	6	7
WC	(Paraguay) AD Vallejo	7	4	5
(United Kingdom) J Clarke	7^{7}	6
2	(Switzerland) A Bellier	6^{4}	4

Second round
8	(Argentina) JP Ficovich	7	6
WC	(Mexico) R Pacheco Méndez	5	1
(United States) E Zhu	2	6^{3}
3	(Argentina) TA Tirante	6	7^{7}
Q	(Estonia) M Lajal	7	6
(Kazakhstan) D Yevseyev	5	1
(France) T Atmane	7^{7}	6
(United Kingdom) J Clarke	6^{4}	4

Quarterfinals
8	(Argentina) JP Ficovich	3	2
3	(Argentina) TA Tirante	6	6
Q	(Estonia) M Lajal	6	7
(France) T Atmane	3	5

Semifinals
3	(Argentina) TA Tirante	6	6
Q	(Estonia) M Lajal	2	3
