= 2025 Morelos Open – Doubles =

Doubles
- 2025 Morelos Open

Final
- Champions: (Antigua and Barbuda) Jody Maginley (United States) Alfredo Perez
- Runners-up: (New Zealand) Finn Reynolds (New Zealand) James Watt
- Score: 7–5, 6–7^{(5–7)}, [10–8]

Events
| Singles | Doubles |
| ← 2024 · | Morelos Open | · 2026 → |

Arjun Kadhe and Jeevan Nedunchezhiyan were the defending champions but chose not to defend their title.

Jody Maginley and Alfredo Perez won the title after defeating Finn Reynolds and James Watt 7–5, 6–7^{(5–7)}, [10–8] in the final.

== Seeds ==
1. Ivan Liutarevich / (United Kingdom) Marcus Willis (quarterfinals)
2. (United States) George Goldhoff / (United States) Trey Hilderbrand (first round)
3. (Philippines) Francis Alcantara / (Thailand) Pruchya Isaro (semifinals)
4. (Canada) Juan Carlos Aguilar / (United States) Mac Kiger (semifinals)

== Draw ==
=== Key ===
- Q = Qualifier
- WC = Wild card
- LL = Lucky loser
- Alt = Alternate
- SE = Special exempt
- PR = Protected ranking
- ITF = ITF entry
- JE = Junior exempt
- w/o = Walkover
- r = Retired
- d = Defaulted
- SR = Special ranking

=== Draw ===
First round
1 | I Liutarevich (United Kingdom) M Willis | 6 | 7
(Austria) M Neuchrist (Austria) J Rodionov | 3 | 5
WC | (Mexico) Rodrigo Alujas (Mexico) Guillermo Tunas | 2 | 6 | [7]
PR | (Antigua and Barbuda) J Maginley (United States) A Perez | 6 | 4 | [10]
4 | (Canada) JC Aguilar (United States) M Kiger | 7^{7} | 6
(Tunisia) A Dougaz (Zimbabwe) CJ Lock | 6^{4} | 3
(Colombia) N Mejía (Colombia) A Urrea | 3 | 6 | [10]
(Venezuela) LD Martínez (Mexico) R Pacheco Méndez | 6 | 3 | [7]
(Spain) Iván Marrero Curbelo (United Kingdom) M Whitehouse | 6 | 7^{7}
(Brazil) M Alves (Argentina) JP Ficovich | 4 | 6^{3}
WC | (Mexico) A Hernández (Mexico) Daniel Moreno | 7^{7} | 5 | [13]
3 | (Philippines) FC Alcantara (Thailand) P Isaro | 6^{1} | 7 | [15]
(Australia) B Bayldon (Kazakhstan) B Zhukayev | 5 | 4
(Chinese Taipei) R Ho (United States) G Nanda | 7 | 6
(New Zealand) F Reynolds (New Zealand) J Watt | 7^{13} | 6
2 | (United States) G Goldhoff (United States) T Hilderbrand | 6^{11} | 4

Quarterfinals
1 | I Liutarevich (United Kingdom) M Willis | 4 | 6^{4}
PR | (Antigua and Barbuda) J Maginley (United States) A Perez | 6 | 7^{7}
4 | (Canada) JC Aguilar (United States) M Kiger | 7 | 6
(Colombia) N Mejía (Colombia) A Urrea | 5 | 3
(Spain) I Marrero Curbelo (United Kingdom) M Whitehouse | 4 | 4
3 | (Philippines) FC Alcantara (Thailand) P Isaro | 6 | 6
(Chinese Taipei) R Ho (United States) G Nanda | 4 | 3
(New Zealand) F Reynolds (New Zealand) J Watt | 6 | 6

Semifinals
PR | (Antigua and Barbuda) J Maginley (United States) A Perez | 6 | 7^{7}
4 | (Canada) JC Aguilar (United States) M Kiger | 3 | 6^{5}
3 | (Philippines) FC Alcantara (Thailand) P Isaro | 3 | 6 | [15]
(New Zealand) F Reynolds (New Zealand) J Watt | 6 | 2 | [17]

Final
PR | (Antigua and Barbuda) J Maginley (United States) A Perez | 7 | 6^{5} | [10]
(New Zealand) F Reynolds (New Zealand) J Watt | 5 | 7^{7} | [8]
