= 2023 Morelos Open – Doubles =

Doubles
- 2023 Morelos Open

Final
- Champions: (Tunisia) Skander Mansouri (Greece) Michail Pervolarakis
- Runners-up: (Zimbabwe) Benjamin Lock (New Zealand) Rubin Statham
- Score: 6–4, 6–4

Events
Singles	Doubles
← 2022 ·	Morelos Open	· 2024 →

JC Aragone and Adrián Menéndez Maceiras were the defending champions but chose not to defend their title.

Skander Mansouri and Michail Pervolarakis won the title after defeating Benjamin Lock and Rubin Statham 6–4, 6–4 in the final.

== Seeds ==
1. (Bolivia) Boris Arias / (Bolivia) Federico Zeballos (first round)
2. (France) Théo Arribagé / (France) Luca Sanchez (first round)
3. (Tunisia) Skander Mansouri / (Greece) Michail Pervolarakis (champions)
4. (Zimbabwe) Benjamin Lock / (New Zealand) Rubin Statham (final)

== Draw ==
=== Key ===
- Q = Qualifier
- WC = Wild card
- LL = Lucky loser
- Alt = Alternate
- SE = Special exempt
- PR = Protected ranking
- ITF = ITF entry
- JE = Junior exempt
- w/o = Walkover
- r = Retired
- d = Defaulted
- SR = Special ranking

First round
1	(Bolivia) B Arias (Bolivia) F Zeballos	6	1	[9]
(Argentina) MF Descotte (Mexico) H Hach Verdugo	4	6	[11]
WC	(Mexico) R Pacheco Méndez (Paraguay) AD Vallejo	7	5	[11]
(United States) A Perez (United States) E Zhu	5	7	[13]
(Colombia) N Mejía (Colombia) A Urrea	7	7^{7}
Alt	(Estonia) D Glinka (Estonia) Karl Kiur Saar	5	6^{5}
(United States) A Lawson (Kazakhstan) D Yevseyev	6	6
Alt	(Germany) Elmar Ejupovic (Latvia) R Strombachs	4	4
(United Kingdom) J Clarke (United Kingdom) J Paris	3	6	[6]
3	(Tunisia) S Mansouri (Greece) M Pervolarakis	6	4	[10]
WC	(Mexico) Luca Lemaitre (Mexico) AF Rubio Fierros	6^{3}	2
Alt	(Japan) N Nakagawa (Australia) A Walton	7^{7}	6
(Estonia) M Lajal (China) Y Bu	6	5	[10]
2	(France) T Arribagé (France) L Sanchez	2	7	[5]

Quarterfinals
(Argentina) MF Descotte (Mexico) H Hach Verdugo	3	4
(United States) A Perez (United States) E Zhu	6	6
4	(Zimbabwe) B Lock (New Zealand) R Statham	6	6
(Colombia) N Mejía (Colombia) A Urrea	2	2
(United States) A Lawson (Kazakhstan) D Yevseyev	2	2
3	(Tunisia) S Mansouri (Greece) M Pervolarakis	6	6
Alt	(Japan) N Nakagawa (Australia) A Walton	6^{5}	3
(Estonia) M Lajal (China) Y Bu	7^{7}	6

Semifinals
(United States) A Perez (United States) E Zhu	4	6	[6]
4	(Zimbabwe) B Lock (New Zealand) R Statham	6	1	[10]
3	(Tunisia) S Mansouri (Greece) M Pervolarakis	w/o
(Estonia) M Lajal (China) Y Bu

Final
4	(Zimbabwe) B Lock (New Zealand) R Statham	4	4
3	(Tunisia) S Mansouri (Greece) M Pervolarakis	6	6
