= 2025 Morelos Open – Singles =

Singles
- 2025 Morelos Open

Final
- Champion: (Switzerland) Marc-Andrea Hüsler
- Runner-up: (Kazakhstan) Dmitry Popko
- Score: 6–4, 3–6, 6–4

Events
Singles	Doubles
← 2024 ·	Morelos Open	· 2026 →

Giovanni Mpetshi Perricard was the defending champion but chose not to defend his title.

Marc-Andrea Hüsler won the title after defeating Dmitry Popko 6–4, 3–6, 6–4 in the final.

== Seeds ==
1. (Argentina) Thiago Agustín Tirante (first round)
2. (Canada) Alexis Galarneau (semifinals)
3. (Argentina) Juan Pablo Ficovich (quarterfinals)
4. (Switzerland) Marc-Andrea Hüsler (champion)
5. (Brazil) Felipe Meligeni Alves (first round)
6. (Colombia) Nicolás Mejía (first round)
7. (Austria) Jurij Rodionov (second round, retired)
8. (France) Hugo Grenier (first round)

== Draw ==
=== Key ===
- Q = Qualifier
- WC = Wild card
- LL = Lucky loser
- Alt = Alternate
- ITF = ITF entry
- PR = Protected ranking
- SR = Special ranking
- SE = Special exempt
- JE = Junior exempt
- JR = Junior Accelerator Programme entrant
- CO = College Accelerator Programme entrant
- NG = Next Gen Accelerator Program entrant
- w/o = Walkover
- r = Retired
- d = Defaulted

=== Finals ===
Semifinals
(Spain) Rafael Jódar	6	5	2
4	(Switzerland) Marc-Andrea Hüsler	4	7	6
SE	(Kazakhstan) Dmitry Popko	6	7
2	(Canada) Alexis Galarneau	2	5

Final
4	(Switzerland) Marc-Andrea Hüsler	6	3	6
SE	(Kazakhstan) Dmitry Popko	4	6	4

=== Top half ===
First round
1	(Argentina) TA Tirante	6	4	2
Alt	(United States) S Kozlov	4	6	6
WC	(Dominican Republic) R Cid Subervi	3	7	2
(Spain) R Jódar	6	5	6
(Mexico) R Pacheco Méndez	6	6
(Brazil) M Alves	3	4
(Estonia) M Lajal	6	6
6	(Colombia) N Mejía	4	4
4	(Switzerland) M-A Hüsler	3	6	7
(Norway) V Durasovic	6	4	5
(Tunisia) A Dougaz	6^{8}	7^{7}	6^{4}
PR	(Austria) M Neuchrist	7^{10}	6^{4}	7^{7}
Q	(United States) G Nanda	3	6	5
(United States) A Mayo	6	4	7
Q	(Germany) Elmar Ejupovic	6	6^{9}	6
8	(France) H Grenier	4	7^{11}	4

Second round
Alt	(United States) S Kozlov	5	6	2
(Spain) R Jódar	7	3	6
(Mexico) R Pacheco Méndez	7^{7}	6^{3}	7^{10}
(Estonia) M Lajal	6^{4}	7^{7}	6^{8}
4	(Switzerland) M-A Hüsler	6	6
PR	(Austria) M Neuchrist	4	2
(United States) A Mayo	7^{8}	7^{7}
Q	(Germany) E Ejupovic	6^{6}	6^{5}

Quarterfinals
(Spain) R Jódar	5	7	6
(Mexico) R Pacheco Méndez	7	5	1
4	(Switzerland) M-A Hüsler	3	6	6
(United States) A Mayo	6	1	4

Semifinals
(Spain) R Jódar	6	5	2
4	(Switzerland) M-A Hüsler	4	7	6

=== Bottom half ===
First round
5	(Brazil) F Meligeni Alves	3	6^{2}
SE	(Kazakhstan) D Popko	6	7^{7}
Q	(Germany) M Wiskandt	7^{7}	7
(United States) M Cressy	6^{2}	5
WC	(Mexico) Rodrigo Alujas	6	3	6
(Italy) S Napolitano	3	6	4
WC	(Mexico) A Hernández	1	6^{4}
3	(Argentina) JP Ficovich	6	7^{7}
7	(Austria) J Rodionov	6	4	6
Q	(France) T Paris	2	6	4
(United States) M Cassone	3	5
Q	(France) Robin Catry	6	7
(Australia) B Tomic	4	6	6
Q	(Canada) JC Aguilar	6	2	4
(Kazakhstan) B Zhukayev	6^{7}	7^{12}	3
2	(Canada) A Galarneau	7^{9}	6^{10}	6

Second round
SE	(Kazakhstan) D Popko	7	6^{4}	7^{7}
Q	(Germany) M Wiskandt	5	7^{7}	6^{5}
WC	(Mexico) R Alujas	3	4
3	(Argentina) JP Ficovich	6	6
7	(Austria) J Rodionov	5	6	0^{r}
Q	(France) R Catry	7	2	4
(Australia) B Tomic	4	3
2	(Canada) A Galarneau	6	6

Quarterfinals
SE	(Kazakhstan) D Popko	6	6
3	(Argentina) JP Ficovich	1	1
Q	(France) R Catry	4	4
2	(Canada) A Galarneau	6	6

Semifinals
SE	(Kazakhstan) D Popko	6	7
2	(Canada) A Galarneau	2	5
