= 2014 Morelos Open – Singles =

Singles
- 2014 Morelos Open

Final
- Champion: (Austria) Gerald Melzer
- Runner-up: (Dominican Republic) Víctor Estrella Burgos
- Score: 6–1, 6–4

Events
| Singles | Doubles |
| Morelos Open | · 2015 → |

This was the first edition of the event.

Melzer won the title, defeating Víctor Estrella Burgos in the final, 6–1, 6–4.

== Seeds ==
1. (Dominican Republic) Víctor Estrella Burgos (final)
2. (Slovakia) Andrej Martin (second round)
3. (Tunisia) Malek Jaziri (semifinals)
4. (United States) Rajeev Ram (semifinals)
5. (United States) Bobby Reynolds (first round)
6. (Austria) Gerald Melzer (champion)
7. (Venezuela) David Souto (second round)
8. (Italy) Alessio di Mauro (first round)

== Draw ==
=== Key ===
- Q = Qualifier
- WC = Wild card
- LL = Lucky loser
- Alt = Alternate
- SE = Special exempt
- PR = Protected ranking
- ITF = ITF entry
- JE = Junior exempt
- w/o = Walkover
- r = Retired
- d = Defaulted
- SR = Special ranking

=== Finals ===
Semifinals
1 | (Dominican Republic) Víctor Estrella Burgos | 6 | 7^{7}
4 | (United States) Rajeev Ram | 4 | 6^{4}
3 | (Tunisia) Malek Jaziri | 4 | 2
6 | (Austria) Gerald Melzer | 6 | 6

Final
1 | (Dominican Republic) Víctor Estrella Burgos | 1 | 4
6 | (Austria) Gerald Melzer | 6 | 6

=== Top half ===
First round
1 | (Dominican Republic) V Estrella Burgos | 6 | 6
(Belgium) Y Mertens | 3 | 3
WC | (Mexico) L Patiño | 4 | 2
(Germany) T Pütz | 6 | 6
Q | (South Africa) D O'Brien | 3 | 2
Q | (Brazil) Henrique Cunha | 6 | 6
(Colombia) N Barrientos | 6 | 5 | 1
7 | (Venezuela) D Souto | 0 | 7 | 6
4 | (United States) R Ram | 6 | 6
(Zimbabwe) T Garanganga | 1 | 3
(Brazil) F Romboli | 2 | 0
(United States) J Jung | 6 | 6
Q | (Colombia) JC Spir | 7^{7} | 6^{8} | 6
WC | (Mexico) T Hank | 6^{3} | 7^{10} | 1
(United States) N Meister | 6 | 6
8 | (Italy) A di Mauro | 2 | 1

Second round
1 | (Dominican Republic) V Estrella Burgos | 6^{5} | 6 | 6
(Germany) T Pütz | 7^{7} | 4 | 2
Q | (Brazil) H Cunha | 6 | 4 | 6
7 | (Venezuela) D Souto | 3 | 6 | 4
4 | (United States) R Ram | 6 | 6
(United States) J Jung | 4 | 4
Q | (Colombia) JC Spir | 4 | 6^{5}
(United States) N Meister | 6 | 7^{7}

Quarterfinals
1 | (Dominican Republic) V Estrella Burgos | 7 | 6
Q | (Brazil) H Cunha | 5 | 2
4 | (United States) R Ram | 6 | 7
(United States) N Meister | 4 | 5

Semifinals
1 | (Dominican Republic) V Estrella Burgos | 6 | 7^{7}
4 | (United States) R Ram | 4 | 6^{4}

=== Bottom half ===
First round
5 | (United States) B Reynolds | 6^{0} | 4
PR | (United States) D Kosakowski | 7^{7} | 6
(United States) C Buchanan | 6 | 6
(Argentina) Tomás Lipovšek Puches | 3 | 0
(Italy) A Giannessi | 2 | 6 | 7^{7}
(Dominican Republic) J Hernández | 6 | 1 | 6^{5}
(Ecuador) E Gómez | 2 | 4
3 | (Tunisia) M Jaziri | 6 | 6
6 | (Austria) G Melzer | 6 | 6
(Bolivia) H Dellien | 0 | 3
Q | (Ecuador) G Lapentti | 7^{7} | 6^{4} | 3
WC | (Mexico) MÁ Reyes-Varela | 6^{5} | 7^{7} | 6
(Brazil) T Turini | 3 | 1
(Colombia) C Salamanca | 6 | 6
WC | (Mexico) Rogelio Siller | 3 | 3
2 | (Slovakia) A Martin | 6 | 6

Second round
PR | (United States) D Kosakowski | 6 | 6
(United States) C Buchanan | 3 | 4
(Italy) A Giannessi | 1 | 0
3 | (Tunisia) M Jaziri | 6 | 6
6 | (Austria) G Melzer | 6 | 6
WC | (Mexico) MÁ Reyes-Varela | 4 | 2
(Colombia) C Salamanca | 7^{7} | 7^{7}
2 | (Slovakia) A Martin | 6^{4} | 6^{2}

Quarterfinals
PR | (United States) D Kosakowski | 3 | 7 | 6^{5}
3 | (Tunisia) M Jaziri | 6 | 5 | 7^{7}
6 | (Austria) G Melzer | 6 | 6
(Colombia) C Salamanca | 4 | 4

Semifinals
3 | (Tunisia) M Jaziri | 4 | 2
6 | (Austria) G Melzer | 6 | 6
