= 2018 Morelos Open – Singles =

Singles
- 2018 Morelos Open

Final
- Champion: (United States) Dennis Novikov
- Runner-up: (Chile) Cristian Garín
- Score: 6–4, 6–3

Events
Singles	Doubles
← 2017 ·	Morelos Open	· 2019 →

Alexander Bublik was the defending champion but chose not to defend his title.

Dennis Novikov won the title after defeating Cristian Garín 6–4, 6–3 in the final.

== Seeds ==
1. (Slovakia) Andrej Martin (quarterfinals)
2. (United States) Kevin King (quarterfinals)
3. (United States) Dennis Novikov (champion)
4. (United States) Evan King (second round)
5. (El Salvador) Marcelo Arévalo (first round)
6. (Australia) Thanasi Kokkinakis (semifinals, withdrew)
7. (Serbia) Peđa Krstin (semifinals)
8. (Kazakhstan) Dmitry Popko (quarterfinals)

== Draw ==
=== Key ===
- Q = Qualifier
- WC = Wild card
- LL = Lucky loser
- Alt = Alternate
- SE = Special exempt
- PR = Protected ranking
- ITF = ITF entry
- JE = Junior exempt
- w/o = Walkover
- r = Retired
- d = Defaulted
- SR = Special ranking

=== Finals ===
Semifinals
6/WC	(Australia) Thanasi Kokkinakis
(Chile) Cristian Garín	w/o
3	(United States) Dennis Novikov	6	6
7	(Serbia) Peđa Krstin	1	4

Final
(Chile) Cristian Garín	4	3
3	(United States) Dennis Novikov	6	6

=== Top half ===
First round
1	(Slovakia) A Martin	6	5	7
(Ecuador) R Quiroz	2	7	5
(United States) C Eubanks	6	6
(South Africa) N Scholtz	3	4
(Colombia) DE Galán	6	0
(Dominican Republic) J Hernández-Fernández	1	0^{r}
(Spain) Carlos Boluda-Purkiss	2	6^{4}
6/WC	(Australia) T Kokkinakis	6	7^{7}
4	(United States) E King	6^{1}	6	6
(New Zealand) R Statham	7^{7}	3	3
(Australia) M Matosevic	2	4
(Chile) C Garín	6	6
WC	(Mexico) L Patiño	0	2
(Colombia) A González	6	6
(Canada) S Diez	6	2	2
8	(Kazakhstan) D Popko	4	6	6

Second round
1	(Slovakia) A Martin	6	6
(United States) C Eubanks	4	2
(Colombia) DE Galán	6^{4}	5
6/WC	(Australia) T Kokkinakis	7^{7}	7
4	(United States) E King	3	6^{4}
(Chile) C Garín	6	7^{7}
(Colombia) A González	1	3
8	(Kazakhstan) D Popko	6	6

Quarterfinals
1	(Slovakia) A Martin	6	6^{7}	2
6/WC	(Australia) T Kokkinakis	3	7^{9}	6
(Chile) C Garín	6	3	6
8	(Kazakhstan) D Popko	1	6	1

Semifinals
6/WC	(Australia) T Kokkinakis
(Chile) C Garín	w/o

=== Bottom half ===
First round
5	(El Salvador) M Arévalo	4	7	6^{6}
Q	(Germany) S Fanselow	6	5	7^{8}
(United States) A Sarkissian	6	6
WC	(Mexico) M Sánchez	4	4
(Germany) J Choinski	4	3
(Croatia) A Pavić	6	6
(Spain) R Ortega Olmedo	6^{2}	7	4
3	(United States) D Novikov	7^{7}	5	6
7	(Serbia) P Krstin	6	6
WC	(Mexico) T Hank	3	0
(United States) A Krajicek	5	0^{r}
Q	(Dominican Republic) R Cid Subervi	7	1
(Spain) M Vilella Martínez	4	6	4
Q	(Mexico) G López Villaseñor	6	4	6
Q	(Ecuador) E Gómez	4	3
2	(United States) K King	6	6

Second round
Q	(Germany) S Fanselow	4	4
(United States) A Sarkissian	6	6
(Croatia) A Pavić	4	6^{7}
3	(United States) D Novikov	6	7^{9}
7	(Serbia) P Krstin	6^{5}	6	6
Q	(Dominican Republic) R Cid Subervi	7^{7}	3	0
Q	(Mexico) G López Villaseñor	1	1
2	(United States) K King	6	6

Quarterfinals
(United States) A Sarkissian	1	6^{4}
3	(United States) D Novikov	6	7^{7}
7	(Serbia) P Krstin	6	6
2	(United States) K King	4	4

Semifinals
3	(United States) D Novikov	6	6
7	(Serbia) P Krstin	1	4
