= 2015 Morelos Open – Doubles =

Doubles
- 2015 Morelos Open

Final
- Champions: (Philippines) Ruben Gonzales (United Kingdom) Darren Walsh
- Runners-up: (Ecuador) Emilio Gómez (Venezuela) Roberto Maytín
- Score: 4–6, 6–3, [12–10]

Events
Singles	Doubles
← 2014 ·	Morelos Open	· 2016 →

Andrej Martin and Gerald Melzer were the defending champions, but Martin chose not to participate. Melzer partnered with Yannick Mertens instead and lost in the first round.

Ruben Gonzales and Darren Walsh won the title, defeating Emilio Gómez and Roberto Maytín in the final, 4–6, 6–3, [12–10].

== Seeds ==
1. (Mexico) César Ramírez / (Mexico) Miguel Ángel Reyes-Varela (quarterfinals)
2. (Colombia) Nicolás Barrientos / (Colombia) Eduardo Struvay (quarterfinals)
3. (Philippines) Ruben Gonzales / (United Kingdom) Darren Walsh (champions)
4. (South Africa) Dean O'Brien / (Colombia) Juan Carlos Spir (quarterfinals)

== Draw ==
=== Key ===
- Q = Qualifier
- WC = Wild card
- LL = Lucky loser
- Alt = Alternate
- SE = Special exempt
- PR = Protected ranking
- ITF = ITF entry
- JE = Junior exempt
- w/o = Walkover
- r = Retired
- d = Defaulted
- SR = Special ranking

First round
1	(Mexico) C Ramírez (Mexico) MÁ Reyes-Varela	1	6	[12]
(Ecuador) G Lapentti (Spain) D Muñoz de la Nava	6	2	[10]
(Spain) I Cervantes (Spain) J Samper-Montaña	7^{7}	6
(Bolivia) H Dellien (Argentina) JI Londero	6^{5}	2
3	(Philippines) R Gonzales (United Kingdom) D Walsh	4	6	[10]
(Peru) S Galdós (United States) D Novikov	6	3	[6]
WC	(Brazil) Wilson Leite (Mexico) Alejandro Moreno Figueroa	4	3
WC	(Mexico) T Hank (Mexico) M Sánchez	6	6
(Ecuador) E Gómez (Venezuela) R Maytín	7	6^{5}	[10]
WC	(Mexico) D Garza (Mexico) L Patiño	5	7^{7}	[5]
(Italy) T Fabbiano (Italy) M Viola	2	6^{2}
4	(South Africa) D O'Brien (Colombia) JC Spir	6	7^{7}
(United States) J Jung (United States) Connor Smith	6	3	[8]
(Dominican Republic) J Hernández (Bulgaria) D Kutrovsky	4	6	[10]
(Austria) G Melzer (Belgium) Y Mertens	6^{8}	6^{3}
2	(Colombia) N Barrientos (Colombia) E Struvay	7^{10}	7^{7}

Quarterfinals
1	(Mexico) C Ramírez (Mexico) MÁ Reyes-Varela	7^{8}	0	[7]
(Spain) I Cervantes (Spain) J Samper-Montaña	6^{8}	6	[10]
3	(Philippines) R Gonzales (United Kingdom) D Walsh	6	6^{6}	[10]
WC	(Mexico) T Hank (Mexico) M Sánchez	4	7^{8}	[8]
(Ecuador) E Gómez (Venezuela) R Maytín	6	7
4	(South Africa) D O'Brien (Colombia) JC Spir	3	5
(Dominican Republic) J Hernández (Bulgaria) D Kutrovsky	6	7^{8}
2	(Colombia) N Barrientos (Colombia) E Struvay	2	6^{6}

Semifinals
(Spain) I Cervantes (Spain) J Samper-Montaña	3	7^{7}	[6]
3	(Philippines) R Gonzales (United Kingdom) D Walsh	6	6^{2}	[10]
(Ecuador) E Gómez (Venezuela) R Maytín	6	6
(Dominican Republic) J Hernández (Bulgaria) D Kutrovsky	4	3

Final
3	(Philippines) R Gonzales (United Kingdom) D Walsh	4	6	[12]
(Ecuador) E Gómez (Venezuela) R Maytín	6	3	[10]
