= 2025 Morelos Open =

- Date: 31 March – 6 April
- Edition: 11th
- Surface: Hard
- Location: Cuernavaca, Mexico

Champions

Singles
- (Switzerland) Marc-Andrea Hüsler

Doubles
- (Antigua and Barbuda) Jody Maginley / (United States) Alfredo Perez
← 2024 ·	Morelos Open	· 2026 →

The 2025 Morelos Open was a professional tennis tournament played on outdoor hard courts. It was the 11th edition of the tournament which was part of the 2025 ATP Challenger Tour. It took place in Cuernavaca, Mexico, between 31 March and 6 April 2025.

== Singles main draw entrants ==
=== Seeds ===
Country	Player	Rank^{1}	Seed
ARG	Thiago Agustín Tirante	117	1
CAN	Alexis Galarneau	159	2
ARG	Juan Pablo Ficovich	162	3
SUI	Marc-Andrea Hüsler	172	4
BRA	Felipe Meligeni Alves	176	5
COL	Nicolás Mejía	190	6
AUT	Jurij Rodionov	197	7
FRA	Hugo Grenier	204	8

- ^{1} Rankings as of 17 March 2025.

=== Other entrants ===
The following players received wildcards into the singles main draw:

- (Mexico) Rodrigo Alujas
- (Dominican Republic) Roberto Cid Subervi
- (Mexico) Alex Hernández

The following player received entry into the singles main draw using a protected ranking:

- (Austria) Maximilian Neuchrist

The following player received entry into the singles main draw as a special exempt:

- (Kazakhstan) Dmitry Popko

The following player received entry into the singles main draw as an alternate:

- (United States) Stefan Kozlov

The following players received entry from the qualifying draw:

- (Canada) Juan Carlos Aguilar
- (France) Robin Catry
- (Germany) Elmar Ejupovic
- (United States) Govind Nanda
- (France) Tom Paris
- (Germany) Max Wiskandt

== Champions ==
=== Singles ===
- (Switzerland) Marc-Andrea Hüsler def. (Kazakhstan) Dmitry Popko 6–4, 3–6, 6–4.

=== Doubles ===
- (Antigua and Barbuda) Jody Maginley / (United States) Alfredo Perez def. (New Zealand) Finn Reynolds / (New Zealand) James Watt 7–5, 6–7^{(5–7)}, [10–8].
