= 2018 Morelos Open – Doubles =

Doubles
- 2018 Morelos Open

Final
- Champions: (Venezuela) Roberto Maytín (Brazil) Fernando Romboli
- Runners-up: (United States) Evan King (United States) Nathan Pasha
- Score: 7–5, 6–3

Events
Singles	Doubles
← 2017 ·	Morelos Open	· 2019 →

Austin Krajicek and Jackson Withrow were the defending champions but only Krajicek chose to defend his title, partnering Matt Reid. Krajicek withdrew before the tournament began due to injury.

Roberto Maytín and Fernando Romboli won the title after defeating Evan King and Nathan Pasha 7–5, 6–3 in the final.

== Seeds ==
1. (El Salvador) Marcelo Arévalo / (Mexico) Miguel Ángel Reyes-Varela (quarterfinals)
2. (United States) Austin Krajicek / (Australia) Matt Reid (withdrew)
3. (Argentina) Franco Agamenone / (Peru) Sergio Galdós (quarterfinals)
4. (South Africa) Ruan Roelofse / (United States) Max Schnur (semifinals)

== Draw ==
=== Key ===
- Q = Qualifier
- WC = Wild card
- LL = Lucky loser
- Alt = Alternate
- SE = Special exempt
- PR = Protected ranking
- ITF = ITF entry
- JE = Junior exempt
- w/o = Walkover
- r = Retired
- d = Defaulted
- SR = Special ranking

First round
1	(El Salvador) M Arévalo (Mexico) MÁ Reyes-Varela	6	6
(Philippines) R Gonzales (United States) H Reese	3	4
(United States) E King (United States) N Pasha	7^{12}	6
WC	(Mexico) L Patiño (Ecuador) R Quiroz	6^{10}	4
4	(South Africa) R Roelofse (United States) M Schnur	6	6
(Canada) S Diez (Spain) R Ortega Olmedo	4	4
(United States) D Novikov (Croatia) A Pavić	6	6
WC	(Mexico) G López Villaseñor (Mexico) M Sánchez	3	4
(Bolivia) B Arias (Bolivia) F Zeballos	3	7^{7}	[10]
(Serbia) P Krstin (Kazakhstan) D Popko	6	6^{5}	[6]
WC	(Mexico) Isaac Arturo Arévalo (Mexico) T Hank	1	0
3	(Argentina) F Agamenone (Peru) S Galdós	6	6
(Venezuela) R Maytín (Brazil) F Romboli	6	6
(Portugal) B Saraiva (Netherlands) S Verbeek	3	3
(Venezuela) LD Martínez (New Zealand) R Statham	w/o
Alt	(Colombia) DE Galán (Colombia) A González

Quarterfinals
1	(El Salvador) M Arévalo (Mexico) MÁ Reyes-Varela	3	6^{5}
(United States) E King (United States) N Pasha	6	7^{7}
4	(South Africa) R Roelofse (United States) M Schnur	7^{10}	7^{8}
(United States) D Novikov (Croatia) A Pavić	6^{8}	6^{6}
(Bolivia) B Arias (Bolivia) F Zeballos	7^{7}	6
3	(Argentina) F Agamenone (Peru) S Galdós	6^{5}	4
(Venezuela) R Maytín (Brazil) F Romboli	6^{6}	6	[10]
(Venezuela) LD Martínez (New Zealand) R Statham	7^{8}	4	[8]

Semifinals
(United States) E King (United States) N Pasha	7^{8}	7^{9}
4	(South Africa) R Roelofse (United States) M Schnur	6^{6}	6^{7}
(Bolivia) B Arias (Bolivia) F Zeballos	3	4
(Venezuela) R Maytín (Brazil) F Romboli	6	6

Final
(United States) E King (United States) N Pasha	5	3
(Venezuela) R Maytín (Brazil) F Romboli	7	6
