= 2015 Morelos Open – Singles =

Singles
- 2015 Morelos Open

Final
- Champion: (Dominican Republic) Víctor Estrella Burgos
- Runner-up: (Bosnia and Herzegovina) Damir Džumhur
- Score: 7–5, 6–4

Events
Singles	Doubles
- Morelos Open

Gerald Melzer was the defending champion, but lost to Víctor Estrella Burgos in the semifinals. Estrella Burgos would go on to win the title defeating Damir Džumhur 7–5, 6–4 in the final.

== Seeds ==
1. (Dominican Republic) Víctor Estrella Burgos (champion)
2. (Colombia) Alejandro Falla (quarterfinals)
3. (Bosnia and Herzegovina) Damir Džumhur (final)
4. (Chinese Taipei) Jimmy Wang (first round)
5. (Spain) Adrián Menéndez-Maceiras (semifinals)
6. (Austria) Gerald Melzer (semifinals)
7. (United States) Austin Krajicek (first round)
8. (Italy) Matteo Viola (second round)

== Draw ==
Key

- Q = Qualifier
- WC = Wild card
- LL = Lucky loser
- Alt = Alternate
- ITF = ITF entry
- PR = Protected ranking
- SR = Special ranking
- SE = Special exempt
- JE = Junior exempt
- JR = Junior Accelerator Programme entrant
- CO = College Accelerator Programme entrant
- NG = Next Gen Accelerator Program entrant
- w/o = Walkover
- r = Retired
- d = Defaulted

=== Finals ===
Semifinals
1	(Dominican Republic) Víctor Estrella Burgos	6	6
6	(Austria) Gerald Melzer	4	2
3/SE	(Bosnia and Herzegovina) Damir Džumhur	6^{3}	6	7^{7}
5	(Spain) A Menéndez-Maceiras	7^{7}	3	6^{5}

Final
1	(Dominican Republic) Víctor Estrella Burgos	7	6
3/SE	(Bosnia and Herzegovina) Damir Džumhur	5	4

=== Top half ===
First round
1	(Dominican Republic) V Estrella Burgos	6	2	6
Q	(Brazil) Henrique Cunha	4	6	2
(Colombia) N Barrientos	6	4
(Argentina) JI Londero	3	0^{r}
(United States) D Novikov	6	6
WC	(Mexico) L Patiño	4	2
(Argentina) A Velotti	4	2
8	(Italy) M Viola	6	6
4	(Chinese Taipei) J Wang	5	2
Alt	(Ecuador) G Lapentti	7	6
(United States) D Nguyen	6	6
(Bolivia) H Dellien	1	1
Q	(Bulgaria) D Kutrovsky	6	4	6
(Spain) I Cervantes	4	6	4
(Dominican Republic) J Hernández	2	6^{6}
6	(Austria) G Melzer	6	7^{8}

Second round
1	(Dominican Republic) V Estrella Burgos	6	1	7^{7}
(Colombia) N Barrientos	4	6	6^{3}
(United States) D Novikov	3	6	6
8	(Italy) M Viola	6	4	2
Alt	(Ecuador) G Lapentti	6^{2}	6^{6}
(United States) D Nguyen	7^{7}	7^{8}
Q	(Bulgaria) D Kutrovsky	6^{6}	3
6	(Austria) G Melzer	7^{8}	6

Quarterfinals
1	(Dominican Republic) V Estrella Burgos	6	6^{6}	6
(United States) D Novikov	4	7^{8}	2
(United States) D Nguyen	1	1
6	(Austria) G Melzer	6	6

Semifinals
1	(Dominican Republic) V Estrella Burgos	6	6
6	(Austria) G Melzer	4	2

=== Bottom half ===
First round
7	(United States) A Krajicek	7	3	4
(United States) J Jung	5	6	6
Q	(Austria) B Trinker	4	7^{7}	6
(Belgium) Y Mertens	6	6^{2}	4
(Colombia) E Struvay	3	4
Q	(United States) Connor Smith	6	6
(Spain) D Muñoz de la Nava	3	3
3/SE	(Bosnia and Herzegovina) D Džumhur	6	6
5	(Spain) A Menéndez-Maceiras	6	6
(Italy) T Fabbiano	2	4
WC	(Mexico) T Hank	5	1
(Ecuador) G Escobar	7	6
WC	(Mexico) Fabian Lara	3	1
WC	(Mexico) D Garza	6	6
(Spain) J Samper-Montaña	4	4
2	(Colombia) A Falla	6	6

Second round
(United States) J Jung	6	6
Q	(Austria) B Trinker	1	4
Q	(United States) C Smith	4	2
3/SE	(Bosnia and Herzegovina) D Džumhur	6	6
5	(Spain) A Menéndez-Maceiras	6	4	7^{7}
(Ecuador) G Escobar	4	6	6^{2}
WC	(Mexico) D Garza	6	4	4
2	(Colombia) A Falla	4	6	6

Quarterfinals
(United States) J Jung	4	1
3/SE	(Bosnia and Herzegovina) D Džumhur	6	6
5	(Spain) A Menéndez-Maceiras	7	6
2	(Colombia) A Falla	5	3

Semifinals
3/SE	(Bosnia and Herzegovina) D Džumhur	6^{3}	6	7^{7}
5	(Spain) A Menéndez-Maceiras	7^{7}	3	6^{5}
