= 2014 Morelos Open – Doubles =

Doubles
- 2014 Morelos Open

Final
- Champions: (Slovakia) Andrej Martin (Austria) Gerald Melzer
- Runners-up: (Mexico) Alejandro Moreno Figueroa (Mexico) Miguel Ángel Reyes-Varela
- Score: 6–2, 6–4

Events
Singles	Doubles
Morelos Open	· 2015 →

This was the first edition of the event.

Martin and Melzer won the title, defeating Alejandro Moreno Figueroa and Miguel Ángel Reyes-Varela in the final, 6–2, 6–4.

== Seeds ==
1. (Colombia) Nicolás Barrientos / (Colombia) Eduardo Struvay (quarterfinals)
2. (Australia) Jordan Kerr / (Germany) Tim Pütz (first round)
3. (United States) Kevin King / (Colombia) Juan Carlos Spir (semifinals)
4. (United States) Rajeev Ram / (United States) Bobby Reynolds (quarterfinals)

== Draw ==
=== Key ===
- Q = Qualifier
- WC = Wild card
- LL = Lucky loser
- Alt = Alternate
- SE = Special exempt
- PR = Protected ranking
- ITF = ITF entry
- JE = Junior exempt
- w/o = Walkover
- r = Retired
- d = Defaulted
- SR = Special ranking

=== Draw ===
First round
1	(Colombia) N Barrientos (Colombia) E Struvay	6	6
WC	(Mexico) C Ramírez (Mexico) Rogelio Siller	1	4
(Italy) A di Mauro (Italy) A Giannessi	3	6	[6]
WC	(Mexico) Alejandro Moreno Figueroa (Mexico) MÁ Reyes-Varela	6	4	[10]
3	(United States) K King (Colombia) J-C Spir	6	6
(Colombia) C Salamanca (Venezuela) D Souto	3	2
WC	(Mexico) C Díaz Figueroa (Mexico) L Patiño	3	2
(Venezuela) R Maytín (Brazil) F Romboli	6	6
(Dominican Republic) V Estrella Burgos (Dominican Republic) J Hernández	2	5
(Slovakia) A Martin (Austria) G Melzer	6	7
(Australia) C Letcher (United Kingdom) D Walsh	7^{7}	2	[8]
4	(United States) R Ram (United States) B Reynolds	6^{3}	6	[10]
(Bolivia) H Dellien (Ecuador) E Gómez	1	2
(Tunisia) M Jaziri (Belgium) Y Mertens	6	6
(United States) D Kosakowski (United States) N Meister	7^{11}	6
2	(Australia) J Kerr (Germany) T Pütz	6^{9}	3

Quarterfinals
1	(Colombia) N Barrientos (Colombia) E Struvay
WC	(Mexico) A Moreno Figueroa (Mexico) MÁ Reyes-Varela	w/o
3	(United States) K King (Colombia) J-C Spir	6	6
(Venezuela) R Maytín (Brazil) F Romboli	4	4
(Slovakia) A Martin (Austria) G Melzer	7^{7}	7
4	(United States) R Ram (United States) B Reynolds	6^{4}	5
(Tunisia) M Jaziri (Belgium) Y Mertens	4^{r}
(United States) D Kosakowski (United States) N Meister	3

Semifinals
WC	(Mexico) A Moreno Figueroa (Mexico) MÁ Reyes-Varela	6	6
3	(United States) K King (Colombia) J-C Spir	4	1
(Slovakia) A Martin (Austria) G Melzer	6	6
(United States) D Kosakowski (United States) N Meister	2	2

Final
WC	(Mexico) A Moreno Figueroa (Mexico) MÁ Reyes-Varela	2	4
(Slovakia) A Martin (Austria) G Melzer	6	6
