= 2015 Morelos Open =

- Date: 16–22 February
- Edition: 2nd
- Draw: 32S / 16D
- Prize money: $75,000+H
- Surface: Hard
- Location: Cuernavaca, Mexico

Champions

Singles
- (Dominican Republic) Víctor Estrella Burgos

Doubles
- (Philippines) Ruben Gonzales / (United Kingdom) Darren Walsh
← 2014 ·	Morelos Open	· 2016 →

The 2015 Morelos Open was a professional tennis tournament played on outdoor hard courts. It was the second edition and it was part of the 2015 ATP Challenger Tour, offering prize money of $75,000. It took place on 16–22 February 2015.

== ATP singles main draw entrants ==
=== Seeds ===
Country	Player	Rank^{1}	Seed
DOM	Víctor Estrella Burgos	52	1
COL	Alejandro Falla	120	2
BIH	Damir Džumhur	123	3
TPE	Jimmy Wang	126	4
ESP	Adrián Menéndez-Maceiras	130	5
AUT	Gerald Melzer	148	6
USA	Austin Krajicek	156	7
ITA	Matteo Viola	188	8

=== Other entrants ===
The following players received wildcards into the singles main draw:

- (Mexico) Daniel Garza
- (Mexico) Tigre Hank
- (Mexico) Fabian Lara
- (Mexico) Luis Patiño

The following players gained entry into the singles main draw as an alternate:

- (Ecuador) Giovanni Lapentti

The following players used special exempt to gain entry into the singles main draw:

- (Bosnia and Herzegovina) Damir Džumhur

The following players received entry from the qualifying draw:

- (Austria) Bastian Trinker
- (United States) Connor Smith
- (Brazil) Henrique Cunha
- (Bulgaria) Dimitar Kutrovsky

== Champions ==
=== Singles ===
- (Dominican Republic) Víctor Estrella Burgos def. (Bosnia and Herzegovina) Damir Džumhur, 7–5, 6–4

=== Doubles ===
- (Philippines) Ruben Gonzales / (United Kingdom) Darren Walsh def. (Ecuador) Emilio Gómez / (Venezuela) Roberto Maytín, 4–6, 6–3, [12–10]
