= 2017 Morelos Open – Singles =

Singles
- 2017 Morelos Open

Final
- Champion: (Kazakhstan) Alexander Bublik
- Runner-up: (Chile) Nicolás Jarry
- Score: 7–6^{(7–5)}, 6–4

Events
Singles	Doubles
- Morelos Open

Gerald Melzer was the defending champion but chose not to defend his title.

Alexander Bublik won the title after defeating Nicolás Jarry 7–6^{(7–5)}, 6–4 in the final.

== Seeds ==
1. (Australia) Jordan Thompson (first round)
2. (Russia) Teymuraz Gabashvili (second round)
3. (Kazakhstan) Alexander Bublik (champion)
4. (United States) Dennis Novikov (first round)
5. (El Salvador) Marcelo Arévalo (first round)
6. (United States) Alexander Sarkissian (first round)
7. (Spain) Jordi Samper Montaña (second round)
8. (Germany) Yannick Maden (first round)

== Draw ==
Key

- Q = Qualifier
- WC = Wild card
- LL = Lucky loser
- Alt = Alternate
- ITF = ITF entry
- PR = Protected ranking
- SR = Special ranking
- SE = Special exempt
- JE = Junior exempt
- JR = Junior Accelerator Programme entrant
- CO = College Accelerator Programme entrant
- NG = Next Gen Accelerator Program entrant
- w/o = Walkover
- r = Retired
- d = Defaulted

=== Finals ===
Semifinals
(Chile) Nicolás Jarry	6	6
(United States) Austin Krajicek	4	4
3	(Kazakhstan) Alexander Bublik	6	6
(Colombia) Eduardo Struvay	4	4

Final
(Chile) Nicolás Jarry	6^{5}	4
3	(Kazakhstan) Alexander Bublik	7^{7}	6

=== Top half ===
First round
1	(Australia) J Thompson	4	3
(Chile) N Jarry	6	6
Q	(Ecuador) G Escobar	5
(Colombia) A Falla	2^{r}
WC	(Mexico) M Sánchez	6	6
WC	(Mexico) L Gómez	3	3
WC	(Mexico) L Patiño	2	5
7	(Spain) J Samper Montaña	6	7
4	(United States) D Novikov	4	7^{7}	2
(United States) A Krajicek	6	6^{1}	6
WC	(Mexico) Antonio Ruiz	4	3
(United States) A El Mihdawy	6	6
Q	(Ecuador) I Endara	6	6
(Republic of Ireland) S Barry	3	4
(Argentina) F Coria	6	6
6	(United States) A Sarkissian	4	4

Second round
(Chile) N Jarry	7^{7}	6^{8}	7^{7}
Q	(Ecuador) G Escobar	6^{5}	7^{10}	6^{4}
WC	(Mexico) M Sánchez	6	6
7	(Spain) J Samper Montaña	4	2
(United States) A Krajicek	4
(United States) A El Mihdawy	0^{r}
Q	(Ecuador) I Endara	6	1
(Argentina) F Coria	1	0^{r}

Quarterfinals
(Chile) N Jarry	6	7^{7}
WC	(Mexico) M Sánchez	4	6^{0}
(United States) A Krajicek	6	6
Q	(Ecuador) I Endara	3	4

Semifinals
(Chile) N Jarry	6	6
(United States) A Krajicek	4	4

=== Bottom half ===
First round
5	(El Salvador) M Arévalo	7	4	2
Q	(Croatia) A Pavić	5	6	6
(Brazil) C Zampieri	1	4
Alt	(Colombia) A Gómez	6	6
(Italy) W Trusendi	2	6	2
(Dominican Republic) J Hernández-Fernández	6	3	6
(Argentina) JP Paz	4	7^{7}	1
3	(Kazakhstan) A Bublik	6	6^{5}	6
8	(Germany) Y Maden	3	0
(Ecuador) E Gómez	6	6
(United States) R Sarmiento	6	6
Q	(Colombia) DE Galán	3	4
(Colombia) E Struvay	6^{2}	7^{7}	7^{7}
PR	(United States) K King	7^{7}	6^{5}	6^{4}
(Belgium) Y Mertens	2	2
2/SE	(Russia) T Gabashvili	6	6

Second round
Q	(Croatia) A Pavić	6	6^{3}	4
Alt	(Colombia) A Gómez	2	7^{7}	6
(Dominican Republic) J Hernández-Fernández	6	4	2
3	(Kazakhstan) A Bublik	4	6	6
(Ecuador) E Gómez	6	7^{7}
(United States) R Sarmiento	4	6^{4}
(Colombia) E Struvay	6	6
2/SE	(Russia) T Gabashvili	4	4

Quarterfinals
Alt	(Colombia) A Gómez	4	4
3	(Kazakhstan) A Bublik	6	6
(Ecuador) E Gómez	4	6^{7}
(Colombia) E Struvay	6	7^{9}

Semifinals
3	(Kazakhstan) A Bublik	6	6
(Colombia) E Struvay	4	4
