= 2018 Morelos Open =

- Date: 19–24 February
- Edition: 5th
- Draw: 32S / 32Q / 16D
- Surface: Hard
- Location: Cuernavaca, Mexico

Champions

Singles
- (United States) Dennis Novikov

Doubles
- (Venezuela) Roberto Maytín / (Brazil) Fernando Romboli
| ← 2017 · | Morelos Open | · 2019 → |

The 2018 Morelos Open, known as Morelos Open Crédito Real, was a professional tennis tournament played on outdoor hard courts. It was the fifth edition of the tournament which was part of the 2018 ATP Challenger Tour. It took place in Cuernavaca, Mexico between 19–24 February 2018.

== Singles main draw entrants ==
=== Seeds ===
| Country | Player | Rank^{1} | Seed |
|---|---|---|---|
| SVK | Andrej Martin | 130 | 1 |
| USA | Kevin King | 183 | 2 |
| USA | Dennis Novikov | 193 | 3 |
| USA | Evan King | 196 | 4 |
| ESA | Marcelo Arévalo | 209 | 5 |
| AUS | Thanasi Kokkinakis | 216 | 6 |
| SRB | Peđa Krstin | 230 | 7 |
| KAZ | Dmitry Popko | 254 | 8 |

- ^{1} Rankings as of 12 February 2018.

=== Other entrants ===
The following players received wildcards into the singles main draw:

- (Mexico) Tigre Hank
- (Australia) Thanasi Kokkinakis
- (Mexico) Luis Patiño
- (Mexico) Manuel Sánchez

The following players received entry from the qualifying draw:

- (Dominican Republic) Roberto Cid Subervi
- (Germany) Sebastian Fanselow
- (Ecuador) Emilio Gómez
- (Mexico) Gerardo López Villaseñor

== Champions ==
=== Singles ===
- (United States) Dennis Novikov def. (Chile) Christian Garín 6–4, 6–3.

=== Doubles ===
- (Venezuela) Roberto Maytín / (Brazil) Fernando Romboli def. (United States) Evan King / (United States) Nathan Pasha 7–5, 6–3.
