= 2026 Morelos Open – Doubles =

Doubles
- 2026 Morelos Open

Final
- Champions: (Ecuador) Andrés Andrade (Argentina) Federico Agustín Gómez
- Runners-up: (India) Rithvik Choudary Bollipalli (India) Arjun Kadhe
- Score: 6–3, 7–6^{(7–4)}

Events
Singles	Doubles
- Morelos Open

Jody Maginley and Alfredo Perez were the defending champions but chose not to defend their title.

Andrés Andrade and Federico Agustín Gómez won the title after defeating Rithvik Choudary Bollipalli and Arjun Kadhe 6–3, 7–6^{(7–4)} in the final.

== Seeds ==
1. (Germany) Jakob Schnaitter / (Germany) Mark Wallner (quarterfinals)
2. (France) Arthur Reymond / (France) Luca Sanchez (first round)
3. (India) Anirudh Chandrasekar / (Japan) Takeru Yuzuki (first round)
4. (Mexico) Miguel Ángel Reyes-Varela / (Bolivia) Federico Zeballos (semifinals)

== Draw ==
Key

- Q = Qualifier
- WC = Wild card
- LL = Lucky loser
- Alt = Alternate
- ITF = ITF entry
- PR = Protected ranking
- SR = Special ranking
- SE = Special exempt
- JE = Junior exempt
- JR = Junior Accelerator Programme entrant
- CO = College Accelerator Programme entrant
- NG = Next Gen Accelerator Program entrant
- w/o = Walkover
- r = Retired
- d = Defaulted

First round
1	(Germany) J Schnaitter (Germany) M Wallner	6	6
(United States) A Ayeni (United States) K Smith	4	4
(India) RC Bollipalli (India) A Kadhe	6	6
(United States) N Lammons (United States) T Winegar	3	4
3	(India) A Chandrasekar (Japan) T Yuzuki	6^{4}	7^{7}	[9]
(United States) B Kittay (United States) T Zink	7^{7}	6^{5}	[11]
(Argentina) F Mena (Mexico) R Pacheco Méndez	6	6
WC	(Mexico) A Hernández (Mexico) A Magadán	3	2
(United States) P Kumar (United States) K Poling	6^{9}	7^{7}	[10]
(Switzerland) M-A Hüsler (Netherlands) T Loof	7^{11}	6^{4}	[6]
WC	(Argentina) JP Ficovich (Colombia) Miguel Tobón	5	6^{3}
4	(Mexico) M Reyes-Varela (Bolivia) F Zeballos	7	7^{7}
Alt	(Ukraine) Vadym Ursu (Kazakhstan) B Zhukayev	6	5	[10]
(Australia) Ja Delaney (Australia) M Polmans	4	7	[8]
(Ecuador) A Andrade (Argentina) FA Gómez	6	7^{8}
2	(France) A Reymond (France) L Sanchez	1	6^{6}

Quarterfinals
1	(Germany) J Schnaitter (Germany) M Wallner	5	4
(India) RC Bollipalli (India) A Kadhe	7	6
(United States) B Kittay (United States) T Zink	4	2
(Argentina) F Mena (Mexico) R Pacheco Méndez	6	6
(United States) P Kumar (United States) K Poling	6	4	[3]
4	(Mexico) M Reyes-Varela (Bolivia) F Zeballos	4	6	[10]
Alt	(Ukraine) V Ursu (Kazakhstan) B Zhukayev	1	5
(Ecuador) A Andrade (Argentina) FA Gómez	6	7

Semifinals
(India) RC Bollipalli (India) A Kadhe	7^{7}	7^{7}
(Argentina) F Mena (Mexico) R Pacheco Méndez	6^{2}	6^{3}
4	(Mexico) M Reyes-Varela (Bolivia) F Zeballos	4	5
(Ecuador) A Andrade (Argentina) FA Gómez	6	7

Final
(India) RC Bollipalli (India) A Kadhe	3	6^{4}
(Ecuador) A Andrade (Argentina) FA Gómez	6	7^{7}
