= 2022 Morelos Open – Doubles =

Doubles
- 2022 Morelos Open

Final
- Champions: (United States) JC Aragone (Spain) Adrián Menéndez Maceiras
- Runners-up: (Colombia) Nicolás Mejía (Ecuador) Roberto Quiroz
- Score: 7–6^{(7–4)}, 6–2

Events
Singles	Doubles
← 2020 ·	Morelos Open	· 2023 →

Luke Saville and John-Patrick Smith were the defending champions but chose not to defend their title.

JC Aragone and Adrián Menéndez Maceiras won the title after defeating Nicolás Mejía and Roberto Quiroz 7–6^{(7–4)}, 6–2 in the final.

== Seeds ==
1. (Venezuela) Luis David Martínez / (India) Jeevan Nedunchezhiyan (first round)
2. (Bolivia) Boris Arias / (Bolivia) Federico Zeballos (semifinals)
3. (United States) JC Aragone / (Spain) Adrián Menéndez Maceiras (champions)
4. (Tunisia) Skander Mansouri / (Greece) Michail Pervolarakis (quarterfinals)

== Draw ==
=== Key ===
- Q = Qualifier
- WC = Wild card
- LL = Lucky loser
- Alt = Alternate
- SE = Special exempt
- PR = Protected ranking
- ITF = ITF entry
- JE = Junior exempt
- w/o = Walkover
- r = Retired
- d = Defaulted
- SR = Special ranking

First round
1	(Venezuela) LD Martínez (India) J Nedunchezhiyan	3	4
(Colombia) N Mejía (Ecuador) R Quiroz	6	6
4	(Tunisia) S Mansouri (Greece) M Pervolarakis	6	4	[10]
(Zimbabwe) B Lock (Zimbabwe) CJ Lock	3	6	[3]
(Argentina) JP Ficovich (Argentina) Matías Zukas	3	2
(India) Y Bhambri (India) S Myneni	6	6
WC	(Mexico) M Sánchez (Australia) B Tomic	3	2
WC	(Mexico) A Hernández (Mexico) R Pacheco Méndez	6	6
(United States) A Kovacevic (Mexico) L Patiño	5	6	[8]
3	(United States) JC Aragone (Spain) A Menéndez Maceiras	7	2	[10]
Alt	(Colombia) JS Gómez (Bolivia) A Mendoza	6^{3}	3
(Switzerland) L Castelnuovo (Australia) A Santillan	7^{7}	6
(Argentina) MF Descotte (Uzbekistan) D Istomin	4	3
2	(Bolivia) B Arias (Bolivia) F Zeballos	6	6

Quarterfinals
(Colombia) N Mejía (Ecuador) R Quiroz	6	6
(Japan) S Mochizuki (Japan) S Shimabukuro	3	2
4	(Tunisia) S Mansouri (Greece) M Pervolarakis	3	6^{5}
(India) Y Bhambri (India) S Myneni	6	7^{7}
WC	(Mexico) A Hernández (Mexico) R Pacheco Méndez	3	6	[7]
3	(United States) JC Aragone (Spain) A Menéndez Maceiras	6	4	[10]
(Switzerland) L Castelnuovo (Australia) A Santillan	6	3	[4]
2	(Bolivia) B Arias (Bolivia) F Zeballos	3	6	[10]

Semifinals
(Colombia) N Mejía (Ecuador) R Quiroz	4	6	[10]
(India) Y Bhambri (India) S Myneni	6	3	[4]
3	(United States) JC Aragone (Spain) A Menéndez Maceiras	4	6	[10]
2	(Bolivia) B Arias (Bolivia) F Zeballos	6	3	[6]

Final
(Colombia) N Mejía (Ecuador) R Quiroz	6^{4}	2
3	(United States) JC Aragone (Spain) A Menéndez Maceiras	7^{7}	6
