= 2014 Morelos Open =

- Date: 17–23 February
- Edition: 1st
- Draw: 32S / 16D
- Prize money: $75,000+H
- Surface: Hard
- Location: Cuernavaca, Mexico

Champions

Singles
- (Austria) Gerald Melzer

Doubles
- (Slovakia) Andrej Martin / (Austria) Gerald Melzer
Morelos Open	· 2015 →

The 2014 Morelos Open was a professional tennis tournament played on outdoor hard courts. It was the 1st edition and it was part of the 2014 ATP Challenger Tour, offering prize money of $75,000. It took place on 17–23 February 2014.

== ATP singles main draw entrants ==
=== Seeds ===
Country	Player	Rank^{1}	Seed
DOM	Víctor Estrella Burgos	132	1
SVK	Andrej Martin	138	2
TUN	Malek Jaziri	146	3
USA	Rajeev Ram	150	4
USA	Bobby Reynolds	179	5
AUT	Gerald Melzer	196	6
VEN	David Souto	222	7
ITA	Alessio di Mauro	232	8

=== Other entrants ===
The following players received wildcards into the singles main draw:

- (Mexico) Tigre Hank
- (Mexico) Luis Patiño
- (Mexico) Miguel Ángel Reyes-Varela
- (Mexico) Rogelio Siller

The following players used protected ranking to gain entry into the singles main draw :

- (United States) Daniel Kosakowski

The following players received entry from the qualifying draw:

- (South Africa) Dean O'Brien
- (Brazil) Henrique Cunha
- (Colombia) Juan Carlos Spir
- (Ecuador) Giovanni Lapentti

== Champions ==
=== Singles ===
- (Austria) Gerald Melzer def. (Dominican Republic) Víctor Estrella Burgos, 6–1, 6–4

=== Doubles ===
- (Slovakia) Andrej Martin / (Austria) Gerald Melzer def. (Mexico) Alejandro Moreno Figueroa / (Mexico) Miguel Ángel Reyes-Varela, 6–2, 6–4
