= 2017 Morelos Open – Doubles =

Doubles
- 2017 Morelos Open

Final
- Champions: (United States) Austin Krajicek (United States) Jackson Withrow
- Runners-up: (United States) Kevin King (South Africa) Dean O'Brien
- Score: 6–7^{(4–7)}, 7–6^{(7–5)}, [11–9]

Events
Singles	Doubles
- Morelos Open

Philip Bester and Peter Polansky were the defending champions but chose not to defend their title.

Austin Krajicek and Jackson Withrow won the title after defeating Kevin King and Dean O'Brien 6–7^{(4–7)}, 7–6^{(7–5)}, [11–9] in the final.

== Seeds ==
1. (El Salvador) Marcelo Arévalo / (Peru) Sergio Galdós (first round)
2. (United States) Dennis Novikov / (United States) Max Schnur (quarterfinals)
3. (Chile) Nicolás Jarry / (Chile) Hans Podlipnik-Castillo (first round)
4. (Australia) Jarryd Chaplin / (Australia) Jordan Thompson (quarterfinals)

== Draw ==
Key

- Q = Qualifier
- WC = Wild card
- LL = Lucky loser
- Alt = Alternate
- ITF = ITF entry
- PR = Protected ranking
- SR = Special ranking
- SE = Special exempt
- JE = Junior exempt
- JR = Junior Accelerator Programme entrant
- CO = College Accelerator Programme entrant
- NG = Next Gen Accelerator Program entrant
- w/o = Walkover
- r = Retired
- d = Defaulted

First round
1	(El Salvador) M Arévalo (Peru) S Galdós	6	3	[6]
WC	(Colombia) A Gómez (Mexico) L Patiño	4	6	[10]
(Republic of Ireland) S Barry (Kazakhstan) A Bublik	6^{3}	4
(Belgium) Y Mertens (Spain) J Samper-Montaña	7^{7}	6
4	(Australia) Jarryd Chaplin (Australia) J Thompson	6	6
PR	(Mexico) H Hach Verdugo (Mexico) C Ramírez	2	3
PR	(United States) K King (South Africa) D O'Brien	6	7^{7}
(Venezuela) LD Martínez (Brazil) C Zampieri	2	6^{5}
WC	(Mexico) Mauricio Astorga (Mexico) M Sánchez	4	6	[8]
(United Kingdom) L Bambridge (United States) A Lawson	6	4	[10]
(United States) A Krajicek (United States) J Withrow	6	6
3	(Chile) N Jarry (Chile) H Podlipnik-Castillo	3	4
WC	(Mexico) L Gómez (Mexico) AF Rubio Fierros	4	3
(Dominican Republic) J Hernández-Fernández (Colombia) E Struvay	6	6
(Ecuador) G Escobar (Ecuador) E Gómez	6^{1}	2
2	(United States) D Novikov (United States) M Schnur	7^{7}	6

Quarterfinals
WC	(Colombia) A Gómez (Mexico) L Patiño	6	6
(Belgium) Y Mertens (Spain) J Samper-Montaña	1	2
4	(Australia) J Chaplin (Australia) J Thompson	5	5
PR	(United States) K King (South Africa) D O'Brien	7	7
(United Kingdom) L Bambridge (United States) A Lawson	3	5
(United States) A Krajicek (United States) J Withrow	6	7
(Dominican Republic) J Hernández-Fernández (Colombia) E Struvay	7^{7}	6
2	(United States) D Novikov (United States) M Schnur	6^{2}	3

Semifinals
WC	(Colombia) A Gómez (Mexico) L Patiño	7^{9}	4	[10]
PR	(United States) K King (South Africa) D O'Brien	6^{7}	6	[12]
(United States) A Krajicek (United States) J Withrow	6	6
(Dominican Republic) J Hernández-Fernández (Colombia) E Struvay	3	4

Final
PR	(United States) K King (South Africa) D O'Brien	7^{7}	6^{5}	[9]
(United States) A Krajicek (United States) J Withrow	6^{4}	7^{7}	[11]
