= 2023 Morelos Open =

- Date: 16–23 April
- Edition: 9th
- Surface: Hard
- Location: Cuernavaca, Mexico

Champions

Singles
- (Argentina) Thiago Agustín Tirante

Doubles
- (Tunisia) Skander Mansouri / (Greece) Michail Pervolarakis
| ← 2022 · | Morelos Open | · 2024 → |

The 2023 Morelos Open, known as Morelos Open presentado por Metaxchange, was a professional tennis tournament played on outdoor hard courts. It was the ninth edition of the tournament which was part of the 2023 ATP Challenger Tour. It took place in Cuernavaca, Mexico between 16 and 23 April 2023.

== Singles main draw entrants ==
=== Seeds ===
| Country | Player | Rank^{1} | Seed |
|---|---|---|---|
| AUS | James Duckworth | 115 | 1 |
| SUI | Antoine Bellier | 168 | 2 |
| ARG | Thiago Agustín Tirante | 186 | 3 |
| AUT | Maximilian Neuchrist | 192 | 4 |
| FRA | Antoine Escoffier | 193 | 5 |
| ARG | Renzo Olivo | 203 | 6 |
| CAN | Alexis Galarneau | 229 | 7 |
| ARG | Juan Pablo Ficovich | 231 | 8 |

- ^{1} Rankings as of 10 April 2023.

=== Other entrants ===
The following players received wildcards into the singles main draw:

- (Mexico) Rodrigo Pacheco Méndez
- (Australia) Bernard Tomic
- (Paraguay) Daniel Vallejo

The following player received entry into the singles main draw as an alternate:

- (Kazakhstan) Beibit Zhukayev

The following players received entry from the qualifying draw:

- (Romania) Marius Copil
- (Argentina) Matías Franco Descotte
- (Estonia) Mark Lajal
- (United States) Christian Langmo
- (Japan) Naoki Nakagawa
- (Australia) Luke Saville

== Champions ==
=== Singles ===
- (Argentina) Thiago Agustín Tirante def. (Australia) James Duckworth 7–5, 6–0.

=== Doubles ===
- (Tunisia) Skander Mansouri / (Greece) Michail Pervolarakis def. (Zimbabwe) Benjamin Lock / (New Zealand) Rubin Statham 6–4, 6–4.
