= 2022 Morelos Open – Singles =

Singles
- 2022 Morelos Open

Final
- Champion: (United Kingdom) Jay Clarke
- Runner-up: (Spain) Adrián Menéndez Maceiras
- Score: 6–1, 4–6, 7–6^{(7–5)}

Events
Singles	Doubles
- Morelos Open

Jurij Rodionov was the defending champion but chose not to defend his title.

Jay Clarke won the title after defeating Adrián Menéndez Maceiras 6–1, 4–6, 7–6^{(7–5)} in the final.

== Seeds ==
1. (United States) Ernesto Escobedo (quarterfinals)
2. (Netherlands) Tim van Rijthoven (first round)
3. (United Kingdom) Jay Clarke (champion)
4. (Argentina) Juan Pablo Ficovich (first round)
5. (Canada) Brayden Schnur (first round, retired)
6. (Colombia) Nicolás Mejía (second round)
7. (Japan) Yūichi Sugita (first round, retired)
8. (Australia) Rinky Hijikata (semifinals)

== Draw ==
Key

- Q = Qualifier
- WC = Wild card
- LL = Lucky loser
- Alt = Alternate
- ITF = ITF entry
- PR = Protected ranking
- SR = Special ranking
- SE = Special exempt
- JE = Junior exempt
- JR = Junior Accelerator Programme entrant
- CO = College Accelerator Programme entrant
- NG = Next Gen Accelerator Program entrant
- w/o = Walkover
- r = Retired
- d = Defaulted

=== Finals ===
Semifinals
(Spain) Adrián Menéndez Maceiras	1	6	6
(South Korea) Chung Yun-seong	6	1	4
3	(United Kingdom) Jay Clarke	6	7
8	(Australia) Rinky Hijikata	2	5

Final
(Spain) Adrián Menéndez Maceiras	1	6	6^{5}
3	(United Kingdom) Jay Clarke	6	4	7^{7}

=== Top half ===
First round
1	(United States) E Escobedo	6	6
(Uzbekistan) D Istomin	4	4
(France) C Hemery	6^{10}	6	3
(India) P Gunneswaran	7^{12}	4	6
Q	(Zimbabwe) B Lock	6	6
(Tunisia) S Mansouri	4	2
(Spain) A Menéndez Maceiras	5	7^{7}	2
5	(Canada) B Schnur	7	6^{3}	1^{r}
4	(Argentina) JP Ficovich	6	4	5
(United States) A Kovacevic	3	6	7
(Australia) B Tomic	3	6	4
(South Korea) Y-s Chung	6	3	6
Q	(United States) K Smith	6	6
Q	(China) F Sun	4	2
WC	(Mexico) A Hernández	6	3
7	(Japan) Y Sugita	3	1^{r}

Second round
1	(United States) E Escobedo	7^{7}	6
(India) P Gunneswaran	6^{2}	4
Q	(Zimbabwe) B Lock	2	3
(Spain) A Menéndez Maceiras	6	6
(United States) A Kovacevic	6	5	4
(South Korea) Y-s Chung	3	7	6
Q	(United States) K Smith	7	6
WC	(Mexico) A Hernández	5	4

Quarterfinals
1	(United States) E Escobedo	1	6^{3}
(Spain) A Menéndez Maceiras	6	7^{7}
(South Korea) Y-s Chung	6	6
Q	(United States) K Smith	1	4

Semifinals
(Spain) A Menéndez Maceiras	1	6	6
(South Korea) Y-s Chung	6	1	4

=== Bottom half ===
First round
6	(Colombia) N Mejía	6	6
(Romania) FC Jianu	4	3
WC	(Mexico) Rodolfo Jauregui Sainz de Rozas	2	2
(Ecuador) R Quiroz	6	6
Q	(Germany) Elmar Ejupovic	6	0
(Portugal) G Oliveira	3	0^{r}
(Norway) V Durasovic	4	7	3
3	(United Kingdom) J Clarke	6	5	6
8	(Australia) R Hijikata	6	6
WC	(Mexico) R Pacheco Méndez	3	2
(Tunisia) M Jaziri	5	6	7^{7}
(Serbia) P Krstin	7	1	6^{2}
Q	(Japan) N Nakagawa	2	1
(Canada) S Diez	6	6
Q	(Japan) S Mochizuki	2	7^{7}	6
2	(Netherlands) T van Rijthoven	6	6^{2}	4

Second round
6	(Colombia) N Mejía	4	6^{5}
(Ecuador) R Quiroz	6	7^{7}
Q	(Germany) E Ejupovic	7^{7}	3	6^{4}
3	(United Kingdom) J Clarke	6^{3}	6	7^{7}
8	(Australia) R Hijikata	6	6
(Tunisia) M Jaziri	0	2
(Canada) S Diez	7^{7}	6
Q	(Japan) S Mochizuki	6^{2}	3

Quarterfinals
(Ecuador) R Quiroz	3	4
3	(United Kingdom) J Clarke	6	6
8	(Australia) R Hijikata	6	6
(Canada) S Diez	0	1

Semifinals
3	(United Kingdom) J Clarke	6	7
8	(Australia) R Hijikata	2	5
