= 2026 Morelos Open – Singles =

Singles
- 2026 Morelos Open

Final
- Champion: (United States) Michael Mmoh
- Runner-up: (Japan) Taro Daniel
- Score: 4–6, 6–4, 6–3

Events
Singles	Doubles
- Morelos Open

Marc-Andrea Hüsler was the defending champion but lost in the quarterfinals to Tyler Zink.

Michael Mmoh won the title after defeating Taro Daniel 4–6, 6–4, 6–3 in the final.

== Seeds ==
1. (Argentina) Federico Agustín Gómez (first round)
2. (Argentina) Juan Pablo Ficovich (first round)
3. (United Kingdom) Oliver Crawford (second round)
4. (Canada) Alexis Galarneau (first round)
5. (Switzerland) Marc-Andrea Hüsler (quarterfinals)
6. (Ecuador) Andrés Andrade (second round)
7. (United States) Stefan Kozlov (second round)
8. (United States) Andres Martin (semifinals)

== Draw ==
Key

- Q = Qualifier
- WC = Wild card
- LL = Lucky loser
- Alt = Alternate
- ITF = ITF entry
- PR = Protected ranking
- SR = Special ranking
- SE = Special exempt
- JE = Junior exempt
- JR = Junior Accelerator Programme entrant
- CO = College Accelerator Programme entrant
- NG = Next Gen Accelerator Program entrant
- w/o = Walkover
- r = Retired
- d = Defaulted

=== Finals ===
Semifinals
(Japan) Taro Daniel	6^{2}	6	6
8	(United States) Andres Martin	7^{7}	3	4
(United States) Michael Mmoh	1	7^{7}	6
(United States) Tyler Zink	6	6^{4}	2

Final
(Japan) Taro Daniel	6	4	3
(United States) Michael Mmoh	4	6	6

=== Top half ===
First round
1	(Argentina) FA Gómez	6	6^{2}	6^{3}
(Canada) D Martin	3	7^{7}	7^{7}
(Kazakhstan) B Zhukayev	4	2
(Argentina) F Mena	6	6
Q	(Australia) Ja Delaney	4	2
(Japan) T Daniel	6	6
PR	(United States) A Mayo	4	6^{4}
6	(Ecuador) A Andrade	6	7^{7}
3	(United Kingdom) O Crawford	6	6
(Germany) M Wiskandt	4	1
Alt	(United States) A Ayeni	2	6	6
(United States) K Smith	6	3	3
Q	(France) Robin Catry	3	6^{4}
WC	(Mexico) Alejandro Hayen	6	7^{7}
(Ukraine) Vadym Ursu	3	7^{7}	6^{7}
8	(United States) A Martin	6	6^{4}	7^{9}

Second round
(Canada) D Martin	4	5
(Argentina) F Mena	6	7
(Japan) T Daniel	3	6	6
6	(Ecuador) A Andrade	6	3	2
3	(United Kingdom) O Crawford	4	6	3
Alt	(United States) A Ayeni	6	4	6
WC	(Mexico) A Hayen	7	2	3
8	(United States) A Martin	5	6	6

Quarterfinals
(Argentina) F Mena	3	4
(Japan) T Daniel	6	6
Alt	(United States) A Ayeni	5	3
8	(United States) A Martin	7	6

Semifinals
(Japan) T Daniel	6^{2}	6	6
8	(United States) A Martin	7^{7}	3	4

=== Bottom half ===
First round
7	(United States) S Kozlov	6	6
WC	(Mexico) A Magadán	4	4
(United States) M Mmoh	7	6
Q	(Mexico) AF Rubio Fierros	5	1
(India) Aryan Shah	6	1	6
WC	(Mexico) Rodrigo Alujas	2	6	3
(Mexico) R Pacheco Méndez	6	6
4	(Canada) A Galarneau	3	0
5	(Switzerland) M-A Hüsler	4	6	6
Q	(Japan) T Yuzuki	6	3	4
(Mexico) A Hernández	6	6
Q	(Belgium) T Colson	4	0
(United States) T Zink	6	7
(Australia) M Polmans	3	5
Q	(Colombia) Miguel Tobón	6	2	7^{7}
2	(Argentina) JP Ficovich	2	6	6^{5}

Second round
7	(United States) S Kozlov	5	2
(United States) M Mmoh	7	6
(India) A Shah	1	0^{r}
(Mexico) R Pacheco Méndez	6	0
5	(Switzerland) M-A Hüsler	6	6
(Mexico) A Hernández	3	2
(United States) T Zink	7^{7}	4	6
Q	(Colombia) M Tobón	6^{5}	6	3

Quarterfinals
(United States) M Mmoh	6^{7}	6	6
(Mexico) R Pacheco Méndez	7^{9}	2	2
5	(Switzerland) M-A Hüsler	4	3
(United States) T Zink	6	6

Semifinals
(United States) M Mmoh	1	7^{7}	6
(United States) T Zink	6	6^{4}	2
