= 2017 Morelos Open =

- Date: 20–25 February
- Edition: 4th
- Draw: 32S / 32Q / 16D
- Prize money: $50,000+H
- Surface: Hard
- Location: Cuernavaca, Mexico

Champions

Singles
- (Kazakhstan) Alexander Bublik

Doubles
- (United States) Austin Krajicek / (United States) Jackson Withrow
- Morelos Open

The 2017 Morelos Open will be a professional tennis tournament played on outdoor hard courts. It will be the fourth edition of the tournament, which will be part of the 2017 ATP Challenger Tour. It will take place in Cuernavaca, Mexico between 20 and 25 February 2017.

== Singles main draw entrants ==
=== Seeds ===
Country	Player	Rank^{1}	Seed
AUS	Jordan Thompson	63	1
RUS	Teymuraz Gabashvili	161	2
KAZ	Alexander Bublik	169	3
USA	Dennis Novikov	179	4
ESA	Marcelo Arévalo	182	5
USA	Alexander Sarkissian	215	6
ESP	Jordi Samper-Montaña	225	7
GER	Yannick Maden	243	8

- ^{1} Rankings as of 13 February 2017.

=== Other entrants ===
The following players received wildcards into the singles main draw:

- (Mexico) Lucas Gómez
- (Mexico) Luis Patiño
- (Mexico) Antonio Ruiz
- (Mexico) Manuel Sánchez

The following player received entry into the singles main draw as an alternate:

- (Colombia) Alejandro Gómez

The following player received entry into the singles main draw using a protected ranking:

- (United States) Kevin King

The following player received entry into the singles main draw as a special exempt:

- (Russia) Teymuraz Gabashvili

The following players received entry from the qualifying draw:

- (Ecuador) Iván Endara
- (Ecuador) Gonzalo Escobar
- (Colombia) Daniel Elahi Galán
- (Croatia) Ante Pavić

== Champions ==
=== Singles ===
- (Kazakhstan) Alexander Bublik def. (Chile) Nicolás Jarry 7–6^{(7–5)}, 6–4.

=== Doubles ===
- (United States) Austin Krajicek / (United States) Jackson Withrow def. (United States) Kevin King / (South Africa) Dean O'Brien 6–7^{(4–7)}, 7–6^{(7–5)}, [11–9].
