= 2024 Morelos Open – Doubles =

Doubles
- 2024 Morelos Open

Final
- Champions: (India) Arjun Kadhe (India) Jeevan Nedunchezhiyan
- Runners-up: (Poland) Piotr Matuszewski (Australia) Matthew Romios
- Score: 7–6^{(7–5)}, 6–4

Events
Singles	Doubles
- Morelos Open

Skander Mansouri and Michail Pervolarakis were the defending champions but only Mansouri chose to defend his title, partnering Luke Johnson. He lost in the semifinals to Arjun Kadhe and Jeevan Nedunchezhiyan.

Kadhe and Nedunchezhiyan won the title after defeating Piotr Matuszewski and Matthew Romios 7–6^{(7–5)}, 6–4 in the final.

== Seeds ==
1. (United Kingdom) Luke Johnson / (Tunisia) Skander Mansouri (semifinals)
2. (Poland) Piotr Matuszewski / (Australia) Matthew Romios (final)
3. (India) Arjun Kadhe / (India) Jeevan Nedunchezhiyan (champions)
4. (Australia) Rinky Hijikata / (United States) Mac Kiger (first round)

== Draw ==
Key

- Q = Qualifier
- WC = Wild card
- LL = Lucky loser
- Alt = Alternate
- ITF = ITF entry
- PR = Protected ranking
- SR = Special ranking
- SE = Special exempt
- JE = Junior exempt
- JR = Junior Accelerator Programme entrant
- CO = College Accelerator Programme entrant
- NG = Next Gen Accelerator Program entrant
- w/o = Walkover
- r = Retired
- d = Defaulted

=== Draw ===
First round
1	(United Kingdom) L Johnson (Tunisia) S Mansouri	7^{7}	6
(Australia) C Puttergill (New Zealand) R Statham	6^{5}	4
WC	(Germany) Elmar Ejupovic (Mexico) R Pacheco Méndez	4	6^{5}
PR	(Zimbabwe) B Lock (Zimbabwe) CJ Lock	6	7^{7}
3	(India) A Kadhe (India) J Nedunchezhiyan	6	6
WC	(Mexico) A Hernández (Mexico) M Sánchez	2	3
(Netherlands) G Brouwer (United Kingdom) A McHugh	6	2	[10]
(Colombia) N Mejía (Chile) M Soto	4	6	[5]
(Portugal) G Oliveira (United Kingdom) J Paris	3	4
(United States) N Chappell (Mexico) H Hach Verdugo	6	6
(India) RC Bollipalli (India) N Kaliyanda Poonacha	6	6
4	(Australia) R Hijikata (United States) M Kiger	3	2
(United States) R Seggerman (United States) P Trhac	6^{2}	7^{7}	[10]
(Switzerland) A Bellier (Kazakhstan) B Zhukayev	7^{7}	6^{4}	[12]
(France) G Mpetshi Perricard (France) L Sanchez	6	5	[4]
2	(Poland) P Matuszewski (Australia) MC Romios	3	7	[10]

Quarterfinals
1	(United Kingdom) L Johnson (Tunisia) S Mansouri	6	6
PR	(Zimbabwe) B Lock (Zimbabwe) CJ Lock	3	2
3	(India) A Kadhe (India) J Nedunchezhiyan	6	7^{7}
(Netherlands) G Brouwer (United Kingdom) A McHugh	3	6^{4}
(United States) N Chappell (Mexico) H Hach Verdugo	6^{7}	4
(India) RC Bollipalli (India) N Kaliyanda Poonacha	7^{9}	6
(Switzerland) A Bellier (Kazakhstan) B Zhukayev	4	4
2	(Poland) P Matuszewski (Australia) MC Romios	6	6

Semifinals
1	(United Kingdom) L Johnson (Tunisia) S Mansouri	6	6^{5}	[8]
3	(India) A Kadhe (India) J Nedunchezhiyan	4	7^{7}	[10]
(India) RC Bollipalli (India) N Kaliyanda Poonacha	4	6	[7]
2	(Poland) P Matuszewski (Australia) MC Romios	6	3	[10]

Final
3	(India) A Kadhe (India) J Nedunchezhiyan	7^{7}	6
2	(Poland) P Matuszewski (Australia) MC Romios	6^{5}	4
