= 2024 Morelos Open =

- Date: 8–14 April
- Edition: 10th
- Surface: Hard
- Location: Cuernavaca, Mexico

Champions

Singles
- (France) Giovanni Mpetshi Perricard

Doubles
- (India) Arjun Kadhe / (India) Jeevan Nedunchezhiyan
| ← 2023 · | Morelos Open | · 2025 → |

The 2024 Morelos Open, known as Morelos Open presentado por Metaxchange, was a professional tennis tournament played on outdoor hard courts. It was the tenth edition of the tournament which was part of the 2024 ATP Challenger Tour. It took place in Cuernavaca, Mexico, between 8 and 14 April 2024.

== Singles main draw entrants ==
=== Seeds ===
| Country | Player | Rank^{1} | Seed |
|---|---|---|---|
| AUS | Rinky Hijikata | 80 | 1 |
| ARG | Thiago Agustín Tirante | 108 | 2 |
| USA | Zachary Svajda | 128 | 3 |
| AUS | Adam Walton | 138 | 4 |
| FRA | Giovanni Mpetshi Perricard | 161 | 5 |
| USA | Maxime Cressy | 191 | 6 |
| NED | Gijs Brouwer | 199 | 7 |
| KAZ | Beibit Zhukayev | 201 | 8 |

- ^{1} Rankings as of 1 April 2024.

=== Other entrants ===
The following players received wildcards into the singles main draw:

- (Mexico) Ernesto Escobedo
- (Mexico) Rodrigo Pacheco Méndez
- (Canada) Vasek Pospisil

The following players received entry into the singles main draw as alternates:

- (United States) Nick Chappell
- (United States) Christian Langmo

The following players received entry from the qualifying draw:

- (United States) Alafia Ayeni
- (Mexico) Alex Hernández
- (Colombia) Nicolás Mejía
- (Argentina) Facundo Mena
- (New Zealand) Kiranpal Pannu
- (United States) Keegan Smith

== Champions ==
=== Singles ===
- (France) Giovanni Mpetshi Perricard def. (Colombia) Nicolás Mejía 7–5, 7–5.

=== Doubles ===
- (India) Arjun Kadhe / (India) Jeevan Nedunchezhiyan def. (Poland) Piotr Matuszewski / (Australia) Matthew Romios 7–6^{(7–5)}, 6–4.
