= 2024 Morelos Open – Singles =

Singles
- 2024 Morelos Open

Final
- Champion: (France) Giovanni Mpetshi Perricard
- Runner-up: (Colombia) Nicolás Mejía
- Score: 7–5, 7–5

Events
Singles	Doubles
- Morelos Open

Thiago Agustín Tirante was the defending champion but lost in the first round to Rodrigo Pacheco Méndez.

Giovanni Mpetshi Perricard won the title after defeating Nicolás Mejía 7–5, 7–5 in the final.

== Seeds ==
1. (Australia) Rinky Hijikata (first round, retired)
2. (Argentina) Thiago Agustín Tirante (first round)
3. (United States) Zachary Svajda (first round)
4. (Australia) Adam Walton (semifinals)
5. (France) Giovanni Mpetshi Perricard (champion)
6. (United States) Maxime Cressy (semifinals)
7. (Netherlands) Gijs Brouwer (first round)
8. (Kazakhstan) Beibit Zhukayev (quarterfinals)

== Draw ==
Key

- Q = Qualifier
- WC = Wild card
- LL = Lucky loser
- Alt = Alternate
- ITF = ITF entry
- PR = Protected ranking
- SR = Special ranking
- SE = Special exempt
- JE = Junior exempt
- JR = Junior Accelerator Programme entrant
- CO = College Accelerator Programme entrant
- NG = Next Gen Accelerator Program entrant
- w/o = Walkover
- r = Retired
- d = Defaulted

=== Finals ===
Semifinals
6	(United States) Maxime Cressy	6^{6}	6^{5}
Q	(Colombia) Nicolás Mejía	7^{8}	7^{7}
4	(Australia) Adam Walton	6^{6}	7	5
5	(France) Giovanni Mpetshi Perricard	7^{8}	5	7

Final
Q	(Colombia) Nicolás Mejía	5	5
5	(France) Giovanni Mpetshi Perricard	7	7

=== Top half ===
First round
1	(Australia) R Hijikata	5	0^{r}
(Canada) A Galarneau	7	1
(Tunisia) S Mansouri	6^{5}	2
Q	(Argentina) F Mena	7^{7}	6
(Portugal) G Oliveira	4	5
(Argentina) JP Ficovich	6	7
(Germany) S Fanselow	3	3
6	(United States) M Cressy	6	6
3	(United States) Z Svajda	6	3	0
Q	(Colombia) N Mejía	0	6	6
(Czech Republic) D Palán	6	6
Alt	(United States) N Chappell	3	4
(Australia) T Schoolkate	6	6^{5}	6
Q	(New Zealand) K Pannu	4	7^{7}	3
WC	(Canada) V Pospisil	6	6
7	(Netherlands) G Brouwer	1	2

Second round
(Canada) A Galarneau	7^{7}	6
Q	(Argentina) F Mena	6^{3}	1
(Argentina) JP Ficovich	6^{6}	1
6	(United States) M Cressy	7^{8}	6
Q	(Colombia) N Mejía	7	6
(Czech Republic) D Palán	5	3
(Australia) T Schoolkate	7^{7}	4	2
WC	(Canada) V Pospisil	6^{1}	6	6

Quarterfinals
(Canada) A Galarneau	4	6^{5}
6	(United States) M Cressy	6	7^{7}
Q	(Colombia) N Mejía	6	6
WC	(Canada) V Pospisil	4	4

Semifinals
6	(United States) M Cressy	6^{6}	6^{5}
Q	(Colombia) N Mejía	7^{8}	7^{7}

=== Bottom half ===
First round
8	(Kazakhstan) B Zhukayev	7^{8}	6
(Zimbabwe) B Lock	6^{6}	2
Alt	(United States) Christian Langmo	6	6
Q	(Mexico) A Hernández	4	4
(Switzerland) A Bellier	6	6
Q	(United States) K Smith	4	3
Q	(United States) A Ayeni	3	1
4	(Australia) A Walton	6	6
5	(France) G Mpetshi Perricard	7^{7}	7^{7}
WC	(Mexico) E Escobedo	6^{5}	6^{3}
(Australia) O Jasika	6^{1}	3
(United States) A Mayo	7^{7}	6
(France) M Janvier	4	7^{7}	7^{8}
(United Kingdom) A McHugh	6	6^{1}	6^{6}
WC	(Mexico) R Pacheco Méndez	7	6
2	(Argentina) TA Tirante	5	4

Second round
8	(Kazakhstan) B Zhukayev	6	7^{7}
Alt	(United States) C Langmo	3	6^{5}
(Switzerland) A Bellier	6^{11}	4
4	(Australia) A Walton	7^{13}	6
5	(France) G Mpetshi Perricard	7^{8}	6
(United States) A Mayo	6^{6}	4
(France) M Janvier	7^{7}	3	6
WC	(Mexico) R Pacheco Méndez	6^{5}	6	3

Quarterfinals
8	(Kazakhstan) B Zhukayev	6^{3}	7^{7}	4
4	(Australia) A Walton	7^{7}	6^{5}	6
5	(France) G Mpetshi Perricard	6	7^{7}
(France) M Janvier	3	6^{4}

Semifinals
4	(Australia) A Walton	6^{6}	7	5
5	(France) G Mpetshi Perricard	7^{8}	5	7
