= 2022 Morelos Open =

- Date: 25 April – 1 May
- Edition: 8th
- Surface: Hard
- Location: Cuernavaca, Mexico

Champions

Singles
- (United Kingdom) Jay Clarke

Doubles
- (United States) JC Aragone / (Spain) Adrián Menéndez Maceiras
- Morelos Open

The 2022 Morelos Open was a professional tennis tournament played on outdoor hard courts. It was the eighth edition of the tournament which was part of the 2022 ATP Challenger Tour. It took place in Cuernavaca, Mexico between 25 April and 1 May 2022.

== Singles main draw entrants ==
=== Seeds ===
Country	Player	Rank^{1}	! Seed
USA	Ernesto Escobedo	140	1
NED	Tim van Rijthoven	183	2
GBR	Jay Clarke	192	3
ARG	Juan Pablo Ficovich	204	4
CAN	Brayden Schnur	237	5
COL	Nicolás Mejía	239	6
JPN	Yūichi Sugita	250	7
AUS	Rinky Hijikata	254	8

- ^{1} Rankings as of 18 April 2022.

=== Other entrants ===
The following players received wildcards into the singles main draw:

- (Mexico) Alex Hernández
- (Mexico) Rodolfo Jauregui Sainz de Rozas
- (Mexico) Rodrigo Pacheco Méndez

The following players received entry from the qualifying draw:

- (Germany) Elmar Ejupovic
- (Zimbabwe) Benjamin Lock
- (Japan) Shintaro Mochizuki
- (Japan) Naoki Nakagawa
- (United States) Keegan Smith
- (China) Sun Fajing

== Champions ==
=== Singles ===
- (United Kingdom) Jay Clarke def.. (Spain) Adrián Menéndez Maceiras 6–1, 4–6, 7–6^{(7–5)}

=== Doubles ===
- (United States) JC Aragone / (Spain) Adrián Menéndez Maceiras def. (Colombia) Nicolás Mejía / (Ecuador) Roberto Quiroz 7–6^{(7–4)}, 6–2.
