= 2026 Morelos Open =

- Date: 16 – 22 March
- Edition: 12th
- Surface: Hard
- Location: Cuernavaca, Mexico

Champions

Singles
- (United States) Michael Mmoh

Doubles
- (Ecuador) Andrés Andrade / (Argentina) Federico Agustín Gómez
- Morelos Open

The 2026 Morelos Open was a professional tennis tournament played on outdoor hard courts. It was the 12th edition of the tournament which was part of the 2026 ATP Challenger Tour. It took place in Cuernavaca, Mexico, between 16 and 22 March 2026.

== Singles main draw entrants ==
=== Seeds ===
Country	Player	Rank^{1}	Seed
ARG	Federico Agustín Gómez	185	1
ARG	Juan Pablo Ficovich	186	2
GBR	Oliver Crawford	196	3
CAN	Alexis Galarneau	219	4
SUI	Marc-Andrea Hüsler	221	5
ECU	Andrés Andrade	236	6
USA	Stefan Kozlov	270	7
USA	Andres Martin	272	8

- ^{1} Rankings as of 2 March 2026.

=== Other entrants ===
The following players received wildcards into the singles main draw:

- (Mexico) Rodrigo Alujas
- (Mexico) Alejandro Hayen
- (Mexico) Alan Magadán

The following player received entry into the singles main draw using a protected ranking:

- (United States) Aidan Mayo

The following player received entry into the singles main draw as an alternate:

- (United States) Alafia Ayeni

The following players received entry from the qualifying draw:

- (France) Robin Catry
- (Belgium) Tibo Colson
- (Australia) Jake Delaney
- (Mexico) Alan Fernando Rubio Fierros
- (Colombia) Miguel Tobón
- (Japan) Takeru Yuzuki

== Champions ==
=== Singles ===
- (United States) Michael Mmoh def. (Japan) Taro Daniel 4–6, 6–4, 6–3.

=== Doubles ===
- (Ecuador) Andrés Andrade / (Argentina) Federico Agustín Gómez def. (India) Rithvik Choudary Bollipalli / (India) Arjun Kadhe 6–3, 7–6^{(7–4)}.
