= Alfredo Perez (tennis) =

American tennis player (born 1997)

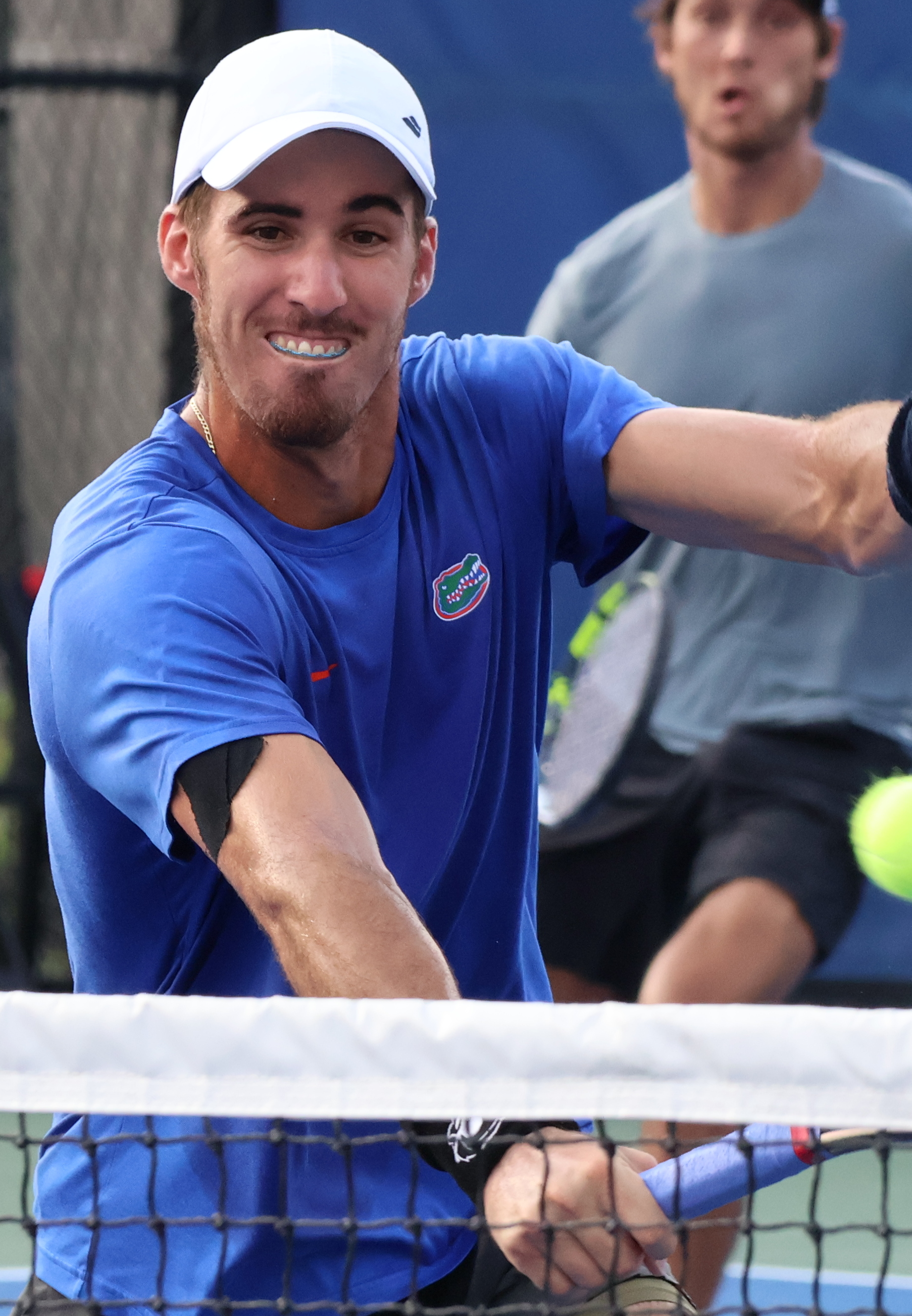
- Perez at the 2023 Cary Challenger II
- Country (sports): United States
- Born: 22 May 1997 (age 29) Havana, Cuba
- Height: 6 ft 4 in (1.93 m)
- Plays: Right-handed (two-handed backhand)
- College: Florida
- Prize money: US $125,557

Singles
- Career record: 0–0
- Career titles: 0
- Highest ranking: No. 315 (November 3, 2025)
- Current ranking: No. 747 (August 31, 2026)

Doubles
- Career record: 0–0
- Career titles: 2 Challenger, 6 Futures
- Highest ranking: No. 182 (October 2, 2023)
- Current ranking: No. 797 (August 31, 2026)
- Last updated on: September 1, 2026.

Alfredo Perez (born 22 May 1997) is an American tennis player. Perez has a career high ATP singles ranking of world No. 315 achieved on November 3, 2025, and a career high doubles ranking of No. 182 achieved on October 2, 2023.

He played college tennis at the University of Florida.

== Career ==
Perez won the ATP Challenger doubles titles at the 2023 Salinas Challenger with Vasil Kirkov and the 2025 Morelos Open with Jody Maginley.
