= Gerald Melzer =

Austrian tennis player

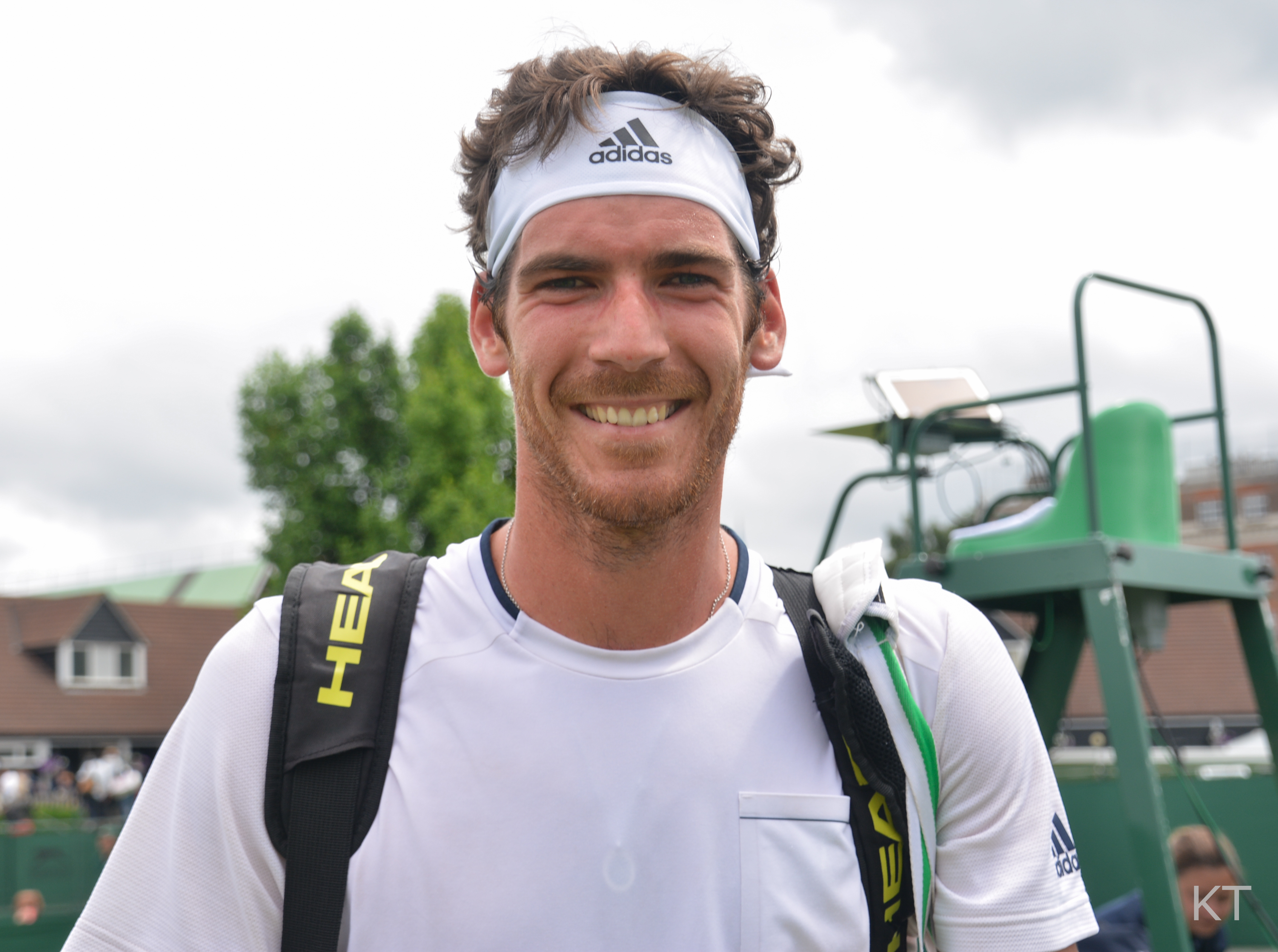
- Melzer at the 2016 Wimbledon qualifying tournament
- Country (sports): Austria
- Residence: Linz, Austria
- Born: 13 July 1990 (age 36) Vienna, Austria
- Height: 1.88 m (6 ft 2 in)
- Turned pro: 2007
- Retired: Sep 2024
- Plays: Left-handed (two-handed backhand)
- Coach: Philipp Wessely, Jan Schellmann
- Prize money: US $990,350

Singles
- Career record: 20–36
- Career titles: 0
- Highest ranking: No. 68 (21 November 2016)

Grand Slam singles results
- Australian Open: 1R (2017, 2018)
- French Open: 1R (2016)
- Wimbledon: Q3 (2016, 2017)
- US Open: Q3 (2018)

Doubles
- Career record: 4–10
- Career titles: 0
- Highest ranking: No. 197 (28 April 2014)

Grand Slam doubles results
- Australian Open: 1R (2017)
- Wimbledon: Q1 (2018)

Gerald Melzer (born 13 July 1990) is an Austrian tennis coach and a former professional player who competed mainly on the ATP Challenger Tour. He achieved a career-high singles ranking of world No. 68 in November 2016. Gerald was also part of the Austrian Davis Cup team.

Gerald is currently coaching Arthur Géa.

== Career ==
Gerald Melzer has primarily spent his time on the Futures circuit, while also playing Challengers and several doubles events with his brother. He began playing on the tour in 2007, competing in tournaments in Austria as well as Futures tournaments in Africa.

In 2008, he has had more success playing doubles, partnering with his brother to win a challenger in Graz, Austria.

In 2015, as a qualifier, Gerald reached the semifinals of Munich.

He faced his brother, Jürgen, in the first round of the 2015 Wimbledon qualifying tournament, and lost in straight sets. Jürgen described it as the "worst tennis day of my life and I hope we will never play each other again."

At the 2017 Australian Open, Melzer lost in the first round to Australian Alex de Minaur in five sets. He held a match point in the fourth set, but was unable to close it out.

== Personal information ==
He is the younger brother of top Austrian tennis player Jürgen Melzer (hence his nickname, Mini Melts) and is the son of Rudolf Melzer, an Austrian businessman and mayor of Deutsch-Wagram, and Michaela, a saleswoman.

== Performance timeline ==
Key
W	F	SF	QF	#R	RR	Q#	DNQ	A	NH

(W) winner; (F) finalist; (SF) semifinalist; (QF) quarterfinalist; (#R) rounds 4, 3, 2, 1; (RR) round-robin stage; (Q#) qualification round; (DNQ) did not qualify; (A) absent; (NH) not held; (SR) strike rate (events won / competed); (W–L) win–loss record.
To avoid confusion and double counting, these charts are updated at the conclusion of a tournament or when the player's participation has ended.

Current through the 2023 ATP Tour.

Tournament	2010	2011	2012	2013	2014	2015	2016	2017	2018	2019	2020	2021	2022	2023	SR	W–L
Grand Slam tournaments
Australian Open	A	A	A	A	A	Q2	A	1R	1R	A	A	A	A	A	0 / 2	0–2
French Open	A	A	A	Q1	Q2	Q1	1R	Q3	Q1	Q1	A	A	A	A	0 / 1	0–1
Wimbledon	A	A	A	A	A	Q1	Q3	Q3	Q2	A	NH	A	Q1	A	0 / 0	0–0
US Open	A	A	A	Q1	Q1	Q1	A	Q1	Q3	A	A	A	Q1	A	0 / 0	0–0
Win–loss	0–0	0–0	0–0	0–0	0–0	0–0	0–1	0–1	0–1	0–0	0–0	0–0	0–0	0–0	0 / 3	0–3
National representation
Davis Cup	A	A	A	A	Z1	Z1	Z1	Z1	PO	A	RR		A	A	0 / 1	4–6
Career statistics
Tournaments	1	0	0	2	3	4	6	7	6	0	0	0	1	0	30	
Overall win–loss	0–1	0–0	0–0	0–2	0–4	4–4	3–8	9–9	4–6	0–0	0–0	0–1	0–1	0–0	20–36	
Year-end ranking	438	349	281	202	162	166	68	100	244	1072	1104	292	373	564	36%	

== ATP Challenger and ITF Futures titles ==
=== Singles: 19 ===
ATP Challenger (8)
ITF Futures (11)

No.	Date	Tournament	Tier	Surface	Opponent	Score
1	Sep 2010	Bujumbura, Burundi	Futures	Clay	(Belgium) Bart Govaerts	6–2, 6–4
2	Sep 2010	Kigali, Rwanda	Futures	Clay	(Russia) Stanislav Vovk	7–6^{(10–8)}, 6–0
3	Sep 2010	Kampala, Uganda	Futures	Clay	(Zimbabwe) Takanyi Garanganga	6–4, 6–4
4	May 2011	Orange Park, United States	Futures	Clay	(Mexico) Daniel Garza	1–1 ret.
5	Oct 2011	Bujumbura, Burundi	Futures	Clay	(South Africa) Ruan Roelofse	6–4, 6–2
6	Nov 2011	Kigali, Rwanda	Futures	Clay	(Austria) Lukas Jastraunig	6–2, 6–4
7	Feb 2012	Santiago, Chile	Futures	Clay	(Chile) Guillermo Rivera Aránguiz	7–6^{(7–4)}, 6–3
8	May 2012	Orange Park, United States	Futures	Clay	(United States) Tennys Sandgren	7–6^{(7–5)}, 6–3
9	Nov 2012	Bujumbura, Burundi	Futures	Clay	(Italy) Alessandro Bega	6–2, 6–3
10	Nov 2012	Kigali, Rwanda	Futures	Clay	(Egypt) Sherif Sabry	6–4, 6–4
11	Sep 2013	Kigali, Rwanda	Futures	Clay	(Austria) Lukas Jastraunig	6–1, 6–1
1	Feb 2014	Morelos, Mexico	Challenger	Hard	(Dominican Republic) Victor Estrella Burgos	6–1, 6–4
2	Jan 2016	Mendoza, Argentina	Challenger	Clay	(France) Axel Michon	4–6, 6–4, 6–0
3	Jan 2016	Bucaramanga, Colombia	Challenger	Clay	(Italy) Paolo Lorenzi	6–3, 6–1
4	Feb 2016	Morelos, Mexico (2)	Challenger	Hard	(Colombia) Alejandro González	7–6^{(7–4)}, 6–3
5	Oct 2016	Mohammedia, Morocco	Challenger	Clay	(Greece) Stefanos Tsitsipas	3–6, 6–3, 6–2
6	Oct 2017	Lima, Peru	Challenger	Clay	(Slovakia) Jozef Kovalík	7–5, 7–6^{(7–4)}
7	Nov 2017	Guayaquil, Ecuador	Challenger	Clay	(Argentina) Facundo Bagnis	6–3, 6–1
8	Oct 2021	Bogotá, Colombia	Challenger	Clay	(Argentina) Facundo Mena	6–2, 3–6, 7–6^{(7–5)}

=== Doubles: 17 ===
ATP Challenger (5)
ITF Futures (12)

No.	Date	Tournament	Tier	Surface	Partner	Opponents	Score
1	Aug 2008	Graz, Austria	Challenger	Clay	(Austria) Jürgen Melzer	(France) Julien Jeanpierre (France) Nicolas Renavand	1–6, 7–6^{(10–8)}, [10–4]
2	Jul 2012	Tampere, Finland	Challenger	Clay	(Austria) Michael Linzer	(Belgium) Niels Desein (Brazil) André Ghem	6–1, 7–6^{(7–3)}
3	Feb 2014	Morelos, Mexico	Challenger	Hard	(Slovakia) Andrej Martin	(Mexico) Alejandro Moreno Figueroa (Mexico) Miguel Ángel Reyes-Varela	6–2, 6–4
4	Jul 2017	Cortina, Italy	Challenger	Clay	(Argentina) Guido Andreozzi	(Australia) Steven de Waard (Japan) Ben McLachlan	6–2, 7–6^{(7–4)}
5	Oct 2021	Lima, Peru	Challenger	Clay	(Germany) Julian Lenz	(Colombia) Nicolás Barrientos (Brazil) Fernando Romboli	7–6^{(7–4)}, 7–6^{(7–3)}
