= Nicolás Mejía =

Colombian tennis player

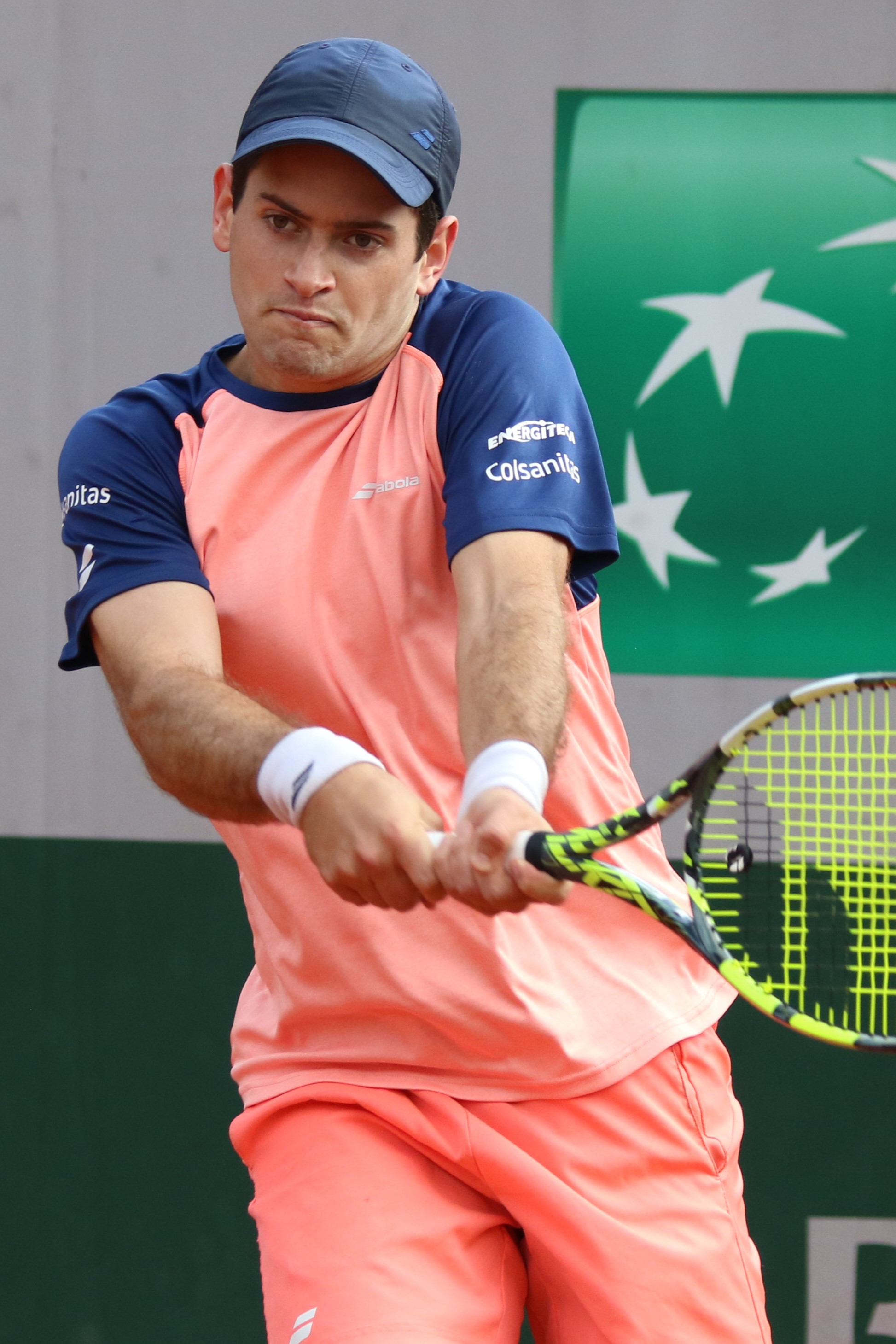
- Mejía at the 2023 French Open
- Country (sports): Colombia
- Residence: Miami, United States
- Born: 11 February 2000 (age 26) Bogotá, Colombia
- Height: 1.83 m (6 ft 0 in)
- Turned pro: 2019
- Plays: Right-handed (two-handed backhand)
- Coach: Juan Felipe Mateus, Ivan Molina, Carlos Salamanca, Ricardo Sánchez
- Prize money: US $878,948

Singles
- Career record: 8–22
- Highest ranking: No. 114 (9 November 2026)
- Current ranking: No. 114 (9 November 2026)

Grand Slam singles results
- Australian Open: Q2 (2026)
- French Open: Q1 (2023, 2026)
- Wimbledon: 2R (2026)
- US Open: Q1 (2026)

Doubles
- Career record: 0–2 (at ATP Tour level, Grand Slam level, and in Davis Cup)
- Highest ranking: No. 153 (7 November 2022)
- Current ranking: No. 692 (9 November 2026)

Team competitions
- Davis Cup: 6–15
Medal record
Representing Colombia
Men's Tennis
Event	1st	2nd	3rd
Youth Olympic Games	0	1	0
CAC Games	0	0	2
South American Youth Games	1	0	2
Total	1	1	4
Central American and Caribbean Games
Bronze medal – third place	2018 Barranquilla	Doubles
Bronze medal – third place	2018 Barranquilla	Team
Youth Olympic Games
Silver medal – second place	2018 Buenos Aires	Mixed doubles
South American Youth Games
Gold medal – first place	2017 Santiago	Mixed doubles
Bronze medal – third place	2017 Santiago	Singles
Bronze medal – third place	2017 Santiago	Doubles
- Last updated on: 9 November 2026.

Nicolás Mejía (Spanish pronunciation: [nikoˈlas meˈxi.a]; (Note: In isolation, Nicolás is pronounced [nikoˈlas].) born 11 February 2000) is a Colombian tennis player. He has a career high ATP singles ranking of world No. 114 achieved on 9 November 2026 and a doubles ranking of No. 153 achieved on 7 November 2022. He is currently the No. 1 Colombian player.

Mejía represents Colombia at the Davis Cup.

== Personal life ==
Nicolas family moved when he was 12 from his home in Cali, Colombia to the Miami area. His older sister Gabriela is also a tennis player. She played college tennis at the University of Miami and is married to his coach Juan Mateus. Nicolas trained at the IMG Academy in Bradenton, Florida.

== Career ==
=== 2018: Junior Wimbledon semifinal ===
In 2018 he reached the semifinals at Junior Wimbledon but lost to Jack Draper.

=== 2024-2025: Maiden Challenger title, top 200 ===
Mejía received wildcards for the qualifying competition at the 2024 Los Cabos Open and also for the 2024 Abierto Mexicano Telcel in Acapulco.

After coming through qualifying, Mejía won his first Challenger singles title in the 2024 San Luis Open Challenger in San Luis Potosí, Mexico, defeating fellow qualifier Matías Soto in the final. He became the first Colombian Challenger champion since Daniel Elahi Galán in 2022. He rose 100 spots back to world No. 344 in the singles rankings on 1 April 2024.

Following a final showing at the 2024 Morelos Open also as a qualifier, defeating third seed Zachary Svajda, Dominik Palán, wildcard Vasek Pospisil and sixth seed Maxime Cressy, he returned to the top 300 on 15 April 2024.

Ranked No. 235, Mejía entered the main draw of the 2024 Winston-Salem Open as a lucky loser but lost to Corentin Moutet.

=== 2026: Major & Masters and top 125 debuts ===
Mejía won his fourth Challenger title, and the second at the same tournament in San Luis Potosí, Mexico, defeating top seed and world No. 80 James Duckworth in the final. Mejía made his Grand Slam debut at the 2026 Wimbledon Championships after he qualified for the main draw.

Ranked No. 129, Mejía made his Masters debut at the 2026 National Bank Open, after qualifying for the main draw, and recorded his first win over Martin Landaluce, before losing to Lorenzo Musetti. He also qualified for the main draws at the 2026 Cincinnati Open and the 2026 Rolex Shanghai Masters.

== Performance timelines ==
Key
W	F	SF	QF	#R	RR	Q#	DNQ	A	NH

(W) winner; (F) finalist; (SF) semifinalist; (QF) quarterfinalist; (#R) rounds 4, 3, 2, 1; (RR) round-robin stage; (Q#) qualification round; (DNQ) did not qualify; (A) absent; (NH) not held; (SR) strike rate (events won / competed); (W–L) win–loss record.
To avoid confusion and double counting, these charts are updated at the conclusion of a tournament or when the player's participation has ended.

Tournament	2023	2024	2025	2026	SR	W–L	Win %
Grand Slam tournaments
Australian Open	A	A	Q1	Q2	0 / 0	0–0	–
French Open	Q1	A	A	Q1	0 / 0	0–0	–
Wimbledon	A	A	A	2R	0 / 1	1–1	50%
US Open	A	A	A	Q1	0 / 0	0–0	–
Win–loss	0–0	0–0	0–0	1–1	0 / 1	1–1	50%
ATP Masters 1000
Indian Wells	A	A	A	Q1	0 / 0	0–0	–
Miami Open	A	A	A	Q1	0 / 0	0–0	–
Canadian Open	A	A	A	2R	0 / 1	1–1	50%
Cincinnati Open	A	A	A	1R	0 / 1	0–1	0%
Shanghai Masters				1R	0 / 1	0–1	0%
Win–loss	0–0	0–0	0–0	1–3	0 / 3	1–3	25%
Career statistics
Overall win-loss (Note: 2021-2022:1-5)	TBD: –	TBD: –	TBD: –	4–5	0 / 7	8–22	27%
Year-End rankings	375	219	212	114	$878,948		

== ATP Challenger Tour finals ==
=== Singles: 9 (5 title, 4 runner-ups) ===
Legend ATP Challenger (5–4)	Finals by surface Hard (0–4) Clay (5–0)

Result	W–L	Date	Tournament	Tier	Surface	Opponent	Score
Loss	0–1	Apr 2021	Salinas, Ecuador	Challenger	Hard	(Chile) Nicolás Jarry	6–7^{(7–9)}, 1–6
Loss	0–2	Jun 2021	Orlando, USA	Challenger	Hard	(United States) Christopher Eubanks	6–2, 6–7^{(3–7)}, 4–6
Win	1–2	Mar 2024	San Luis, Mexico	Challenger	Clay	(Chile) Matías Soto	6–1, 5–7, 6–2
Loss	1–3	Apr 2024	Morelos, Mexico	Challenger	Hard	(France) Giovanni Mpetshi Perricard	5–7, 5–7
Win	2–3	Apr 2025	Savannah, USA	Challenger	Clay (green)	(Canada) Liam Draxl	2–6, 6–2, 7–6^{(7–3)}
Loss	2–4	Sep 2025	Istanbul, Turkey	Challenger	Hard	(Slovenia) Alex Molčan	6–7^{(9–11)}, 2–6
Win	3–4	Nov 2025	Bogotá, Colombia	Challenger	Clay	(Colombia) Juan Sebastián Gómez	6–4, 6–4
Win	4–4	Apr 2026	San Luis, Mexico (2)	Challenger	Clay	(Australia) James Duckworth	7–6^{(8–6)}, 6–2
Win	5–4	Jul 2026	Bogotá, Colombia	Challenger	Clay	(Chile) Matías Soto	6–1, 7–5

=== Doubles: 5 (2 titles, 3 runner-ups) ===
Legend ATP Challenger (2–3)	Finals by surface Hard (0–3) Clay (2–0)

Result	Date	Tournament	Tier	Surface	Partner	Opponents	Score
Loss	Jan 2022	Forlì, Italy	Challenger	Hard (i)	(United States) Alexander Ritschard	(France) Sadio Doumbia (France) Fabien Reboul	2–6, 3–6
Loss	Apr 2022	Cuernavaca, Mexico	Challenger	Hard	(Ecuador) Roberto Quiroz	(United States) JC Aragone (Spain) Adrián Menéndez Maceiras	6–7^{(4–7)}, 2–6
Win	May 2022	Coquimbo, Chile	Challenger	Clay	(Argentina) Guillermo Durán	(Ecuador) Diego Hidalgo (Colombia) Cristian Rodríguez	6–4, 1–6, [10–7]
Win	Jul 2022	Bogotá, Colombia	Challenger	Clay	(Colombia) Andrés Urrea	(Argentina) Ignacio Monzón (Argentina) Gonzalo Villanueva	6–3, 6–4
Loss	May 2025	Little Rock, United States	Challenger	Hard	(Ecuador) Andrés Andrade	(Tunisia) Aziz Dougaz (France) Antoine Escoffier	2–6, 3–6

== ITF World Tennis Tour finals ==
=== Singles: 5 (4 title, 1 runner-up) ===
Legend M25 ITF tournaments (1–0) M15 ITF tournaments (2–1) ITF Futures (1–0)	Finals by surface Hard (2–0) Clay (2–1)

Result	W–L	Date	Tournament	Tier	Surface	Opponent	Score
Win	1–0	Nov 2018	Niceville, USA F30	Futures	Clay	(United States) Strong Kirchheimer	6–4, 6–4
Loss	1–1	Apr 2019	Bucaramanga, Colombia	M15	Clay	(Peru) Mauricio Echazú	6–3, 3–6, 4–6
Win	2–1	Jul 2019	Cancún, Mexico	M15	Hard	(United States) Nicolas Moreno de Alboran	6–2, 7–5
Win	3–1	Jul 2019	Cancún, México	M15	Hard	(United States) Gage Brymer	6–1, 6–2
Win	4–1	May 2024	Anapoima, Colombia	M25	Clay	(New Zealand) Kiranpal Pannu	6–2, 6–2

=== Doubles: 12 (6 title, 6 runner-ups) ===
Legend M25 ITF tournaments (3–0) M15 ITF tournaments (3–4) ITF Futures (0–2)	Finals by surface Hard (4–0) Clay (2–6)

Result	Date	Tournament	Tier	Surface	Partner	Opponents	Score
Loss	Mar 2016	Boca Raton, United States	Future	Clay	(Colombia) José Daniel Bendeck	(Colombia) Alejandro Gómez (Ecuador) Roberto Quiroz	3–6, 6–7^{(2–7)}
Loss	Jun 2016	Cartagena, Colombia	Future	Clay	(Colombia) José Daniel Bendeck	(Argentina) Facundo Mena (Chile) Jorge Montero	4–6, 6–7^{(5–7)}
Win	Feb 2019	Weston, United States	M15	Clay	(United States) Sebastian Korda	(United States) Harrison Adams (United States) Jordi Arconada	6–3, 4–6, [11–9]
Loss	Mar 2019	Antalya, Turkey	M15	Clay	(United States) Sebastian Korda	(Romania) Alexandru Ghilea (Romania) Alexandru Jecan	6–2, 6–2
Loss	Mar 2019	Antalya, Turkey	M15	Clay	(United States) Sebastian Korda	(Peru) Arklon Huertas (Peru) Conner Huertas	6–7^{(3–7)}, 6–4, [10–6]
Win	Jun 2019	Cancún, Mexico	M15	Hard	(Argentina) Axel Geller	(Antigua and Barbuda) Jody Maginley (The Bahamas) Justin Roberts	6–7^{(5–7)}, 6–1, [10–5]
Win	Jul 2019	Cancún, Mexico	M15	Hard	(United Kingdom) Jack Draper	(United States) Aron Pierce (United States) Noah Schachter	4–6, 7–6^{(7–2)}, [10–5]
Win	Aug 2019	Portoviejo, Ecuador	M25	Clay	(Colombia) Jose Daniel Bendeck	(Argentina) Juan P. Ficovich (Argentina) Agustin Riquelme	6–7^{(4–7)}, 6–3, [10–7]
Loss	Feb 2021	Antalya, Turkey	M15	Clay	(Spain) Pedro Vives Marcos	(Argentina) Agustín Velotti (Argentina) Matias Zukas	6–2, 5–7, [5–10]
Loss	Feb 2021	Antalya, Turkey	M15	Clay	(Spain) Pedro Vives Marcos	(Argentina) Pedro Cachín (Argentina) Genaro A. Olivieri	7–5, 1–6, [12–14]
Win	Mar 2024	Santo Domingo, Dominican Republic	M25	Hard	(Colombia) Andrés Urrea	(United Kingdom) Charles Broom (United Kingdom) David Stevenson	7–6^{(7–2)}, 3–6, [10–7]
Win	Mar 2024	Santo Domingo, Dominican Republic	M25	Hard	(Colombia) Andrés Urrea	(United States) Trey Hilderbrand (United States) Pranav Kumar	6–7^{(5–7)}, 6–4, [10–5]

== Junior Grand Slam finals ==
=== Doubles: 1 (runner-up) ===
Result	Year	Tournament	Surface	Partner	Opponents	Score
Loss	2018	Wimbledon	Grass	(Czech Republic) Ondřej Štyler	(Finland) Otto Virtanen (Turkey) Yankı Erel	6–7^{(5–7)}, 4–6

== Record against top 10 players ==
Mejía record against players who have been ranked in the top 10, with those who are active in boldface. Only ATP Tour main draw matches are considered:

Player	Record	Win %	Hard	Clay	Grass	Last match
Number 4 ranked players						
(Japan) **Kei Nishikori**	0–1	0%	0–1	–	–	Lost (4–6, 4–6) at 2024 Davis Cup World Group I
Number 8 ranked players						
(United Kingdom) **Cameron Norrie**	0–1	0%	–	0–1	–	Lost (4–6, 4–6) at 2023 Davis Cup
Total	0–2	0%	0–1 (0%)	0–1 (0%)	0–0 ( – )	* Statistics correct as of 11 January 2025.
