= Luis Patiño (tennis) =

Mexican tennis player (born 1993)

- Country (sports): Mexico
- Residence: Mazatlán, Mexico
- Born: 6 October 1993 (age 33) Guadalajara, Mexico
- Plays: Right-handed (two handed-backhand)
- Prize money: $128,836

Singles
- Career record: 3–7 (at ATP Tour level, Grand Slam level, and in Davis Cup)
- Career titles: 0
- Highest ranking: No. 567 (18 March 2019)

Doubles
- Career record: 1-6 (at ATP Tour level, Grand Slam level, and in Davis Cup)
- Career titles: 7 ITF
- Highest ranking: No. 239 (14 September 2015)

Team competitions
- Davis Cup: 4–6
- Last updated on: 11 March 2022.

Luis Patiño (Spanish pronunciation: [ˈlwis paˈtiɲo]; born 6 October 1993) is a Mexican tennis player.

Patiño has a career high ATP singles ranking of 567, achieved on 18 March 2019. He also has a career high ATP doubles ranking of 239, achieved on 14 September 2015. Patiño has won 7 ITF doubles titles.

Patiño made his ATP main draw debut at the 2016 Abierto Mexicano Telcel, where he received a wildcard into the singles draw.

== Challenger and Futures/World Tennis Tour Finals ==
=== Singles: 3 (0–3) ===
Legend (singles) ATP Challenger Tour (0–0) ITF Futures/World Tennis Tour (0–3)	Titles by surface Hard (0–2) Clay (0–1) Grass (0–0) Carpet (0–0)

Result	W–L	Date	Tournament	Tier	Surface	Opponent	Score
Loss	0–1	Aug 2014	Mexico F10, Puebla	Futures	Hard	(Guatemala) Christopher Díaz Figueroa	0–6, 4–6
Loss	0–2	Jun 2016	Mexico F5, Zapopan	Futures	Clay	(United States) Adam El Mihdawy	3–6, 6–4, 2–6
Loss	0–3	Jan 2022	M15, Cancun, Mexico	World Tennis Tour	Hard	(United States) Brandon Holt	0-6, 3–6

=== Doubles 11 (3–8) ===
Legend (doubles) ATP Challenger Tour (0–1) ITF Futures Tour (3–7)	Titles by surface Hard (3–5) Clay (0–3) Grass (0–0) Carpet (0–0)

Result	W–L	Date	Tournament	Tier	Surface	Partner	Opponents	Score
Loss	0–1	Jul 2012	Belgium F4, Middelkerke	Futures	Hard	(Mexico) Mauricio Astorga	(Syria) Marc Abdelnour (France) Julien Maes	2–6, 3–6
Loss	0–2	Sep 2012	Mexico F9, Manzanillo	Futures	Hard	(Mexico) Mauricio Astorga	(New Zealand) Marvin Barker (United States) Adam El Mihdawy	5–7, 1–6
Loss	0–3	Sep 2012	Mexico F11, Manzanillo	Futures	Hard	(Mexico) Mauricio Astorga	(New Zealand) Marvin Barker (United States) Adam El Mihdawy	3–6, 4–6
Loss	0–4	Sep 2013	Belgium F11, Damme	Futures	Clay	(Israel) Or Ram-Harel	(Mexico) Mauricio Astorga (Mexico) Eduardo Peralta-Tello	2–6, 1–6
Win	1–4	Jul 2014	Venezuela F2, Valencia	Futures	Hard	(Argentina) Mateo Nicolás Martínez	(Peru) Jorge Panta (Peru) Duilio Vallebuona	6–2, 6–4
Loss	1–5	Sep 2014	Bolivia F2, La Paz	Futures	Clay	(Guatemala) Christopher Díaz Figueroa	(Argentina) Franco Feitt (Peru) Duilio Vallebuona	5–7, 0–6
Loss	1–6	Oct 2014	Bolivia F3, Santa Cruz	Futures	Clay	(Guatemala) Christopher Díaz Figueroa	(Argentina) Maximiliano Estévez (Argentina) Franco Feitt	6–7^{(7–9)}, 5–7
Win	2–6	Nov 2014	Mexico F12, Huatulco	Futures	Hard	(Guatemala) Christopher Díaz Figueroa	(Venezuela) David Souto (Argentina) Agustín Velotti	6–3, 3–6, [10–6]
Win	3–6	Nov 2014	Mexico F13, Mazatlán	Futures	Hard	(Guatemala) Christopher Díaz Figueroa	(United States) Andre Dome (United States) Oscar Matthews	7–5, 6–3
Loss	3–7	Feb 2015	Dallas, United States	Challenger	Hard (i)	(Mexico) Hans Hach Verdugo	(Ukraine) Denys Molchanov (Russia) Andrey Rublev	4–6, 6–7^{(5–7)}
Loss	3–8	Jun 2015	Mexico F5, Manzanillo	Futures	Hard	(Venezuela) Luis David Martínez	(Ecuador) Iván Endara (Mexico) Tigre Hank	4–6, 4–6
