= Morelos Open =

- 2025 Morelos Open

Tournament information
- Event name: Morelos Open
- Location: Cuernavaca, Mexico
- Venue: Hotel Racquet Club, el Racquet Club de Cuernavaca (2016-); Hotel Camino Real, Club de Tenis Sumiya (2014-2015)
- Surface: Hard
- Website: Official website
ATP Tour
- Category: ATP Challenger Tour
- Draw: 32S / 32Q / 16D
- Prize money: $100,000 (2025)
WTA Tour
- Category: ITF Women's Circuit
- Draw: 32S / 32Q / 16D
- Prize money: $25,000

The Morelos Open is a professional tennis tournament played on outdoor hardcourts. It is currently part of the ATP Challenger Tour and is held annually in Cuernavaca, Mexico since 2014. It was part of the International Tennis Federation (ITF) Women's Circuit in 2015 and in 2016.

== Past finals ==
=== Men's singles ===
Year	Champion	Runner-up	Score
2026	(United States) Michael Mmoh	(Japan) Taro Daniel	4–6, 6–4, 6–3
2025	(Switzerland) Marc-Andrea Hüsler	(Kazakhstan) Dmitry Popko	6–4, 3–6, 6–4
2024	(France) Giovanni Mpetshi Perricard	(Colombia) Nicolás Mejía	7–5, 7–5
2023	(Argentina) Thiago Agustín Tirante	(Australia) James Duckworth	7–5, 6–0
2022	(United Kingdom) Jay Clarke	(Spain) Adrián Menéndez Maceiras	6–1, 4–6, 7–6^{(7–5)}
2021	Not held		
2020	(Austria) Jurij Rodionov	(Argentina) Juan Pablo Ficovich	4–6, 6–2, 6–3
2019	(Argentina) Matías Franco Descotte	(Ecuador) Gonzalo Escobar	6–1, 6–4
2018	(United States) Dennis Novikov	(Chile) Christian Garín	6–4, 6–3
2017	(Kazakhstan) Alexander Bublik	(Chile) Nicolás Jarry	7–6^{(7–5)}, 6–4
2016	(Austria) Gerald Melzer (2)	(Colombia) Alejandro González	7–6^{(7–4)}, 6–3
2015	(Dominican Republic) Víctor Estrella Burgos	(Bosnia and Herzegovina) Damir Džumhur	7–5, 6–4
2014	(Austria) Gerald Melzer (1)	(Dominican Republic) Víctor Estrella Burgos	6–1, 6–4

=== Men's doubles ===
Year	Champions	Runners-up	Score
2026	(Ecuador) Andrés Andrade (Argentina) Federico Agustín Gómez	(India) Rithvik Choudary Bollipalli (India) Arjun Kadhe	6–3, 7–6^{(7–4)}
2025	(Antigua and Barbuda) Jody Maginley (United States) Alfredo Perez	(New Zealand) Finn Reynolds (New Zealand) James Watt	7–5, 6–7^{(5–7)}, [10–8]
2024	(India) Arjun Kadhe (India) Jeevan Nedunchezhiyan	(Poland) Piotr Matuszewski (Australia) Matthew Romios	7–6^{(7–5)}, 6–4
2023	(Tunisia) Skander Mansouri (Greece) Michail Pervolarakis	(Zimbabwe) Benjamin Lock (New Zealand) Rubin Statham	6–4, 6–4
2022	(United States) JC Aragone (Spain) Adrián Menéndez Maceiras	(Colombia) Nicolás Mejía (Ecuador) Roberto Quiroz	7–6^{(7–4)}, 6–2
2021	Not held		
2020	(Australia) Luke Saville (Australia) John-Patrick Smith	(Spain) Carlos Gómez-Herrera (Japan) Shintaro Mochizuki	6–3, 6–7^{(4–7)}, [10–5]
2019	(Sweden) André Göransson (Switzerland) Marc-Andrea Hüsler	(Ecuador) Gonzalo Escobar (Venezuela) Luis David Martínez	6–3, 3–6, [11–9]
2018	(Venezuela) Roberto Maytín (Brazil) Fernando Romboli	(United States) Evan King (United States) Nathan Pasha	7–5, 6–3
2017	(United States) Austin Krajicek (United States) Jackson Withrow	(United States) Kevin King (South Africa) Dean O'Brien	6–7^{(4–7)}, 7–6^{(7–5)}, [11–9]
2016	(Canada) Philip Bester (Canada) Peter Polansky	(El Salvador) Marcelo Arévalo (Peru) Sergio Galdós	6–4, 3–6, [10–6]
2015	(Philippines) Ruben Gonzales (United Kingdom) Darren Walsh	(Ecuador) Emilio Gómez (Venezuela) Roberto Maytín	4–6, 6–3, [12–10]
2014	(Slovenia) Andrej Martin (Austria) Gerald Melzer	(Mexico) Alejandro Moreno Figueroa (Mexico) Miguel Ángel Reyes-Varela	6–2, 6–4

=== Women's singles ===
Year	Champion	Runner-up	Score
2016	(Czech Republic) Marie Bouzková	(United States) Lauren Albanese	0–6, 6–0, 6–1
2015	(Mexico) Marcela Zacarías	(Serbia) Nina Stojanović	6–3, 6–2

=== Women's doubles ===
Year	Champion	Runner-up	Score
2016	(Bulgaria) Aleksandrina Naydenova (Hungary) Fanny Stollár	(Ukraine) Elizaveta Ianchuk (Czech Republic) Kateřina Kramperová	6–3, 6–2
2015	(Mexico) Victoria Rodríguez (Mexico) Marcela Zacarías	(United States) Alexandra Morozova (United States) Daniella Roldan	6–4, 6–0
