= Miguel Gallardo Valles =

Mexican tennis player

- Country (sports): Mexico
- Born: 8 April 1981 (age 45) Chihuahua, Mexico
- Plays: Right Handed (two-handed backhand)
- Prize money: $243,949 USD

Singles
- Career record: 18-17 (ATP Tour level, Grand Slam level, and Davis Cup)
- Career titles: 0; 2 Challenger, 16 Futures
- Highest ranking: No. 189 (21 October 2002)

Grand Slam singles results
- French Open: Q2 (2004)
- Wimbledon: Q1 (2004, 2005)
- US Open: Q2 (2002)

Doubles
- Career record: 4-5 (ATP Tour level, Grand Slam level, and Davis Cup)
- Career titles: 0; 4 Challenger, 17 Futures
- Highest ranking: No. 174 (14 June 2004)
- Last updated on: 16 September 2021.

Miguel Ángel Gallardo Valles (born July 8, 1981) is a tennis player from Mexico.

He won two ATP Challenger event in 2001 and 2004 in Puebla and he played for the Mexican Davis Cup squad in 2011

Gallardo Valles was banned for 55 days in 2005 after testing positive for cannabis.

== ATP Challenger and ITF Futures finals ==
=== Singles: 50 (18–32) ===
| Legend ATP Challenger (2–0) ITF Futures (16–32) | Finals by surface Hard (17–26) Clay (1–6) Grass (0–0) Carpet (0–0) |

| Result | W–L | Date | Tournament | Tier | Surface | Opponent | Score |
|---|---|---|---|---|---|---|---|
| Win | 1–0 | May 2001 | Mexico F3, Aguascalientes | Futures | Hard | (Mexico) Alejandro Hernández | 6–3, 6–2 |
| Loss | 1–1 | May 2001 | Mexico F5, Cancún | Futures | Hard | (Cuba) Lazaro Navarro-Batles | 5–7, 6–4, 6–7^{(5–7)} |
| Loss | 1–2 | Sep 2001 | Mexico F7, Puerto Vallarta | Futures | Hard | (United States) Chad Carlson | 5–7, 3–6 |
| Loss | 1–3 | Nov 2001 | Mexico F10, Juárez | Futures | Clay | (Argentina) Nicolas Todero | 4–6, 4–6 |
| Loss | 1–4 | Nov 2001 | Mexico F12, Zacatecas | Futures | Hard | (South Africa) Louis Vosloo | 6–1, 5–7, 3–6 |
| Win | 2–4 | Nov 2001 | Puebla, Mexico | Challenger | Hard | (Austria) Zbynek Mlynarik | 6–2, 6–3 |
| Win | 3–4 | May 2002 | Mexico F5, Aguascalientes | Futures | Hard | (United States) Zack Fleishman | 6–7^{(4–7)}, 6–2, 6–3 |
| Win | 4–4 | Jun 2002 | Mexico F9, Ixtapa Zihuatanejo | Futures | Hard | (Mexico) Bruno Echagaray | 6–3, 6–2 |
| Loss | 4–5 | Jun 2002 | Mexico F11, Cancún | Futures | Hard | (United States) Alex Bogomolov Jr. | 4–6, 6–4, 5–7 |
| Loss | 4–6 | Sep 2002 | Mexico F13, Celaya | Futures | Clay | (Mexico) Santiago González | 6–4, 2–6, 2–6 |
| Loss | 4–7 | Jun 2003 | Mexico F9, Chetumal | Futures | Hard | (Brazil) Júlio Silva | 6–1, 2–6, 1–5 ret. |
| Loss | 4–8 | Aug 2003 | Brazil F5, Fortaleza | Futures | Hard | (Brazil) Marcos Daniel | 3–6, 3–6 |
| Win | 5–8 | Oct 2003 | Mexico F16, Torreón | Futures | Hard | (United States) Andres Pedroso | 6–4, 3–6, 6–3 |
| Loss | 5–9 | Nov 2003 | Mexico F19, Mazatlán | Futures | Hard | (Brazil) Franco Ferreiro | 6–7^{(13–15)}, 6–7^{(4–7)} |
| Loss | 5–10 | Mar 2004 | Mexico F2, Naucalpan | Futures | Hard | (Mexico) Alejandro Hernández | 4–6, 4–6 |
| Loss | 5–11 | Oct 2004 | Mexico F15, Obregon | Futures | Hard | (Mexico) Santiago González | 4–6, 4–6 |
| Loss | 5–12 | Nov 2004 | Mexico F16, León | Futures | Hard | (Mexico) Alejandro Hernández | 5–7, 4–6 |
| Win | 6–12 | Nov 2004 | Puebla, Mexico | Challenger | Hard | (Romania) Răzvan Sabău | 7–6^{(7–5)}, 6–4 |
| Loss | 6–13 | Jan 2005 | Costa Rica F1, San José | Futures | Hard | (Netherlands Antilles) Jean-Julien Rojer | 2–6, 1–6 |
| Loss | 6–14 | Feb 2006 | Costa Rica F1, San José | Futures | Hard | (United States) Nicholas Monroe | 6–7^{(6–8)}, 3–6 |
| Win | 7–14 | Mar 2006 | Mexico F4, Cancún | Futures | Hard | (Germany) Alexander Satschko | 6–3, 6–4 |
| Win | 8–14 | Aug 2006 | Mexico F11, Tuxtla Gutierrez | Futures | Hard | (United States) Brett Ross | 6–3, 6–2 |
| Win | 9–14 | Aug 2006 | Venezuela F3, Venezuela | Futures | Hard | (Venezuela) Jimy Szymanski | 6–3, 6–3 |
| Loss | 9–15 | Sep 2006 | Mexico F14, Monterrey | Futures | Hard | (United States) Lester Cook | 6–7^{(3–7)}, 6–4, 6–7^{(2–7)} |
| Loss | 9–16 | Oct 2006 | Mexico F15, Los Mochis | Futures | Clay | (Switzerland) Sven Swinnen | 5–7, 6–4, 6–7^{(2–7)} |
| Win | 10–16 | Oct 2006 | Mexico F17, Obregón | Futures | Hard | (Moldova) Roman Borvanov | 7–5, 3–6, 7–5 |
| Loss | 10–17 | Oct 2006 | Mexico F18, Mazatlán | Futures | Hard | (Japan) Kei Nishikori | 2–6, 1–6 |
| Loss | 10–18 | Jan 2007 | Panama F1, Panama City | Futures | Clay | (Argentina) Juan-Pablo Villar | 2–6, 2–6 |
| Loss | 10–19 | May 2007 | Mexico F3, Córdoba | Futures | Hard | (United States) Nicholas Monroe | 6–7^{(7–9)}, 4–6 |
| Win | 11–19 | Nov 2007 | Mexico F13, Querétaro | Futures | Hard | (Czech Republic) Daniel Lustig | 6–2, 7–5 |
| Loss | 11–20 | Feb 2008 | Mexico F3, Tuxtla Gutierrez | Futures | Hard | (Brazil) Ricardo Hocevar | 7–6^{(7–4)}, 4–6, 4–6 |
| Loss | 11–21 | May 2008 | Mexico F7, Morelia | Futures | Hard | (Australia) Marinko Matosevic | 3–6, 6–4, 3–6 |
| Loss | 11–22 | Sep 2008 | Mexico F9, Metepec | Futures | Hard | (Uruguay) Marcel Felder | 4–6, 7–5, 4–6 |
| Loss | 11–23 | Nov 2008 | Mexico F15, Guadalajara | Futures | Clay | (Switzerland) Michael Lammer | 3–6, 3–6 |
| Win | 12–23 | May 2009 | Mexico F6, Guadalajara | Futures | Clay | (El Salvador) Marcelo Arévalo | 7–5, 5–7, 6–3 |
| Loss | 12–24 | May 2009 | Mexico F7, Celaya | Futures | Hard | (Argentina) Maximiliano Estévez | 4–6, 1–6 |
| Loss | 12–25 | Jun 2009 | Mexico F8, León | Futures | Hard | (Mexico) Bruno Rodríguez | 3–6, 6–7^{(7–9)} |
| Win | 13–25 | Oct 2009 | Mexico F10, Zacatecas | Futures | Hard | (Netherlands) Miliaan Niesten | 1–6, 6–1, 6–7^{(7–2)} |
| Loss | 13–26 | Feb 2010 | Mexico F1, Mexico City | Futures | Hard | (Spain) Arnau Brugués Davi | 2–6, 4–6 |
| Win | 14–26 | May 2010 | Mexico F3, Mexico City | Futures | Hard | (Mexico) Víctor Romero | 6–3, 6–4 |
| Loss | 14–27 | Jan 2011 | Mexico F1, Mexico City | Futures | Hard | (Moldova) Roman Borvanov | 6–4, 2–6, 4–6 |
| Loss | 14–28 | May 2011 | Mexico F3, Mexico City | Futures | Hard | (Chinese Taipei) Jimmy Wang | 5–7, 5–7 |
| Win | 15–28 | Jun 2011 | Mexico F5, Celaya | Futures | Hard | (Moldova) Roman Borvanov | 6–3, 6–4 |
| Win | 16–28 | Aug 2011 | Mexico F9, Tijuana | Futures | Hard | (Australia) Chris Letcher | 6–3, 3–6, 6–4 |
| Loss | 16–29 | May 2012 | Mexico F5, Celaya | Futures | Hard | (Guatemala) Christopher Diaz-Figueroa | 2–6, 0–6 |
| Win | 17–29 | Jan 2013 | Mexico F1, Ixtapa | Futures | Hard | (France) Antoine Benneteau | 4–6, 6–4, 6–1 |
| Win | 18–29 | May 2013 | Mexico F6, Puebla | Futures | Hard | (Barbados) Darian King | 3–6, 6–3, 6–2 |
| Loss | 18–30 | May 2013 | Mexico F7, Puebla | Futures | Hard | (Mexico) M-A Reyes-Varela | 7–6^{(7–5)}, 4–6, 6–7^{(1–7)} |
| Loss | 18–31 | Sep 2013 | Ecuador F3, Quito | Futures | Clay | (United States) Chase Buchanan | 0–6, 4–6 |
| Loss | 18–32 | Aug 2014 | Mexico F9, Rosarito | Futures | Hard | (Mexico) Daniel Garza | 3–6, 4–6 |

=== Doubles: 43 (21–22) ===
| Legend ATP Challenger (4–2) ITF Futures (17–20) | Finals by surface Hard (16–15) Clay (5–7) Grass (0–0) Carpet (0–0) |

| Result | W–L | Date | Tournament | Tier | Surface | Partner | Opponents | Score |
|---|---|---|---|---|---|---|---|---|
| Win | 1–0 | Jun 2000 | Mexico F4, Cozumel | Futures | Hard | (Mexico) Marcello Amador | (United States) Brett Hansen-Dent (United States) Chris Tontz | 7–5, 7–6^{(7–5)} |
| Loss | 1–1 | May 2001 | Mexico F4, Guadalajara | Futures | Clay | (Mexico) Marcello Amador | (Brazil) Ricardo Schlachter (Brazil) Bruno Soares | 2–6, 2–6 |
| Loss | 1–2 | Apr 2002 | Mexico F4, Guadalajara | Futures | Clay | (Mexico) Marcello Amador | (Brazil) Ronaldo Carvalho (Brazil) Henrique Melo | 5–7, 6–2, 4–6 |
| Win | 2–2 | May 2002 | Mexico F5, Aguascalientes | Futures | Hard | (Mexico) Marcello Amador | (Brazil) Bruno Soares (Brazil) Marcelo Melo | 6–4, 6–4 |
| Win | 3–2 | Nov 2002 | Puebla, Mexico | Challenger | Hard | (Mexico) Alejandro Hernández | (United States) Diego Ayala (United States) Robert Kendrick | 6–1, 5–7, 7–6^{(7–3)} |
| Loss | 3–3 | Jun 2003 | Mexico F8, Torreón | Futures | Clay | (Mexico) Marcello Amador | (Mexico) Bruno Echagaray (Mexico) Guillermo Carter | 4–6, 6–3, 3–6 |
| Loss | 3–4 | Jul 2003 | Mexico F10, Acapulco | Futures | Clay | (Mexico) Guillermo Carter | (Mexico) Bruno Echagaray (Mexico) Rodrigo Echagaray | 7–5, 1–6, 6–7^{(5–7)} |
| Loss | 3–5 | Jul 2003 | Campos do Jordão, Brazil | Challenger | Hard | (Argentina) Carlos Berlocq | (South Africa) Rik de Voest (Ecuador) Giovanni Lapentti | 1–6, 5–7 |
| Win | 4–5 | Jan 2004 | Guatemala F1, Guatemala City | Futures | Hard | (Argentina) Carlos Berlocq | (Argentina) Brian Dabul (Argentina) Ignacio Gonzalez-King | 6–7^{(2–7)}, 7–6^{(7–3)}, 7–6^{(7–5)} |
| Win | 5–5 | Mar 2004 | Mexico F2, Naucalpan | Futures | Hard | (Mexico) Alejandro Hernández | (Mexico) Marcello Amador (Mexico) Federico Contreras-Rodriguez | 7–6^{(7–1)}, 6–4 |
| Win | 6–5 | Apr 2004 | León, Mexico | Challenger | Hard | (Mexico) Bruno Echagaray | (Canada) Frédéric Niemeyer (United States) Tripp Phillips | 6–4, 7–6^{(7–1)} |
| Loss | 6–6 | Sep 2004 | Mexico F10, Comitán | Futures | Hard | (Mexico) Bruno Echagaray | (Mexico) Víctor Romero (Israel) Michael Kogan | 7–5, 3–6, 6–7^{(8–10)} |
| Win | 7–6 | Oct 2004 | Mexico F15, Obregón | Futures | Hard | (Mexico) Bruno Echagaray | (Argentina) Guillermo Carry (Finland) Lauri Kiiski | 6–3, 3–6, 7–6^{(7–5)} |
| Loss | 7–7 | Nov 2004 | Puebla, Mexico | Challenger | Hard | (Argentina) Gustavo Marcaccio | (Mexico) Alejandro Hernández (Mexico) Santiago González | 3–6, 4–6 |
| Win | 8–7 | Apr 2006 | León, Mexico | Challenger | Hard | (Mexico) Juan Manuel Elizondo | (Poland) Dawid Olejniczak (Germany) Alexander Satschko | 6–3, 6–4 |
| Loss | 8–8 | May 2006 | Mexico F8, Los Mochis | Futures | Clay | (Mexico) Carlos Palencia | (Switzerland) Sven Swinnen (United States) Michael Johnson | 6–4, 3–6, 4–6 |
| Win | 9–8 | Aug 2006 | Venezuela F3, Valencia | Futures | Hard | (Mexico) Carlos Palencia | (Austria) Christoph Palmanshofer (United States) Jason Zimmermann | 6–0, 6–0 |
| Win | 10–8 | Aug 2006 | Mexico F13, Monterrey | Futures | Clay | (Mexico) Carlos Palencia | (United States) Lester Cook (United States) Shane La Porte | 6–3, 6–4 |
| Loss | 10–9 | Oct 2006 | Mexico F17, Obregón | Futures | Hard | (Mexico) Carlos Palencia | (Canada) Pierre-Ludovic Duclos (Australia) Raphael Durek | 2–6, 4–6 |
| Win | 11–9 | Oct 2006 | Mexico F18, Mazatlán | Futures | Hard | (Mexico) Carlos Palencia | (Mexico) Bruno Rodríguez (Mexico) Víctor Romero | 6–2, 6–4 |
| Win | 12–9 | Jan 2007 | El Salvador F1, San Salvador | Futures | Clay | (Mexico) Carlos Palencia | (Romania) Bogdan-Victor Leonte (Guatemala) Cristian Paiz | 6–2, 6–3 |
| Loss | 12–10 | Jan 2007 | Guatemala F1, Guatemala City | Futures | Hard | (Mexico) Carlos Palencia | (United States) Lester Cook (United States) Shane La Porte | 3–6, 5–7 |
| Loss | 12–11 | Jan 2007 | Panama F1, Panama City | Futures | Clay | (Mexico) Carlos Palencia | (Argentina) Juan-Pablo Amado (Bolivia) Mauricio Doria-Medina | 5–7, 3–6 |
| Win | 13–11 | Apr 2007 | Mexico City, Mexico | Challenger | Hard | (Mexico) Carlos Palencia | (United States) Brendan Evans (United States) Brian Wilson | 6–3, 6–3 |
| Win | 14–11 | May 2007 | Mexico F3, Córdoba | Futures | Hard | (Mexico) Carlos Palencia | (United States) Joel Kielbowicz (United States) Brad Pomeroy | 6–1, 6–4 |
| Win | 15–11 | May 2007 | Mexico F4, Guadalajara | Futures | Clay | (Mexico) Carlos Palencia | (United States) Nicholas Monroe (United States) Brad Pomeroy | 6–4, 6–2 |
| Win | 16–11 | Jun 2007 | USA F12, Loomis | Futures | Hard | (Mexico) Carlos Palencia | (United States) Scoville Jenkins (United States) Nikita Kryvonos | 6–3, 6–2 |
| Loss | 16–12 | May 2008 | Mexico F5, Guadalajara | Futures | Clay | (Mexico) Santiago González | (New Zealand) G.D. Jones (United States) Nima Roshan | 3–6, 6–4, [7–10] |
| Win | 17–12 | Sep 2008 | Mexico F9, Metepec | Futures | Hard | (Mexico) Carlos Palencia | (Mexico) Juan Manuel Elizondo (Mexico) Manuel Sanchez | 6–4, 6–4 |
| Win | 18–12 | May 2009 | Mexico F6, Guadalajara | Futures | Clay | (Mexico) Carlos Palencia | (Mexico) Fernando Cabrera (Mexico) Antonio Ruiz-Rosales | 6–4, 6–3 |
| Win | 19–12 | Sep 2009 | Mexico F9, León | Futures | Hard | (Mexico) Juan Manuel Elizondo | (Mexico) Luis Díaz Barriga (Mexico) Antonio Ruiz-Rosales | 6–0, 5–7, [10–5] |
| Win | 20–12 | Nov 2009 | Mexico F14, Guadalajara | Futures | Clay | (Mexico) Bruno Echagaray | (Canada) Vasek Pospisil (United States) Ashwin Kumar | 3–6, 6–2, [10–6] |
| Loss | 20–13 | May 2010 | Mexico F2, Córdoba | Futures | Hard | (Mexico) Pablo Martinezz | (Mexico) Carlos Palencia (Mexico) Santiago González | 7–5, 6–7^{(4–7)}, [8–10] |
| Loss | 20–14 | May 2010 | Mexico F4, Celaya | Futures | Hard | (Mexico) Pablo Martinez | (United States) Ashwin Kumar (United States) Conor Pollock | 4–6, 4–6 |
| Loss | 20–15 | Jun 2010 | Venezuela F1, Maracaibo | Futures | Hard | (Colombia) Michael Quintero Aguilar | (Colombia) Juan-Sebastian Cabal (Colombia) Robert Farah | 1–6, 5–7 |
| Loss | 20–16 | Jan 2011 | Mexico F1, Mexico City | Futures | Hard | (Mexico) Mauricio Astorga | (Mexico) Luis Díaz Barriga (Mexico) M-A Reyes-Varela | 4–6, 6–7^{(5–7)} |
| Loss | 20–17 | May 2011 | Mexico F3, Mexico City | Futures | Hard | (Guatemala) Christopher Diaz-Figueroa | (Barbados) Darian King (Barbados) Haydn Lewis | 3–6, 4–6 |
| Loss | 20–18 | Aug 2011 | Mexico F8, León | Futures | Hard | (Mexico) Pablo Martinez | (Bulgaria) Boris Nicola Bakalov (Netherlands) Miliaan Niesten | 4–6, 3–6 |
| Loss | 20–19 | Oct 2011 | Mexico F13, Monterrey | Futures | Hard | (Italy) Claudio Grassi | (United States) Adam El Mihdawy (Australia) Nima Roshan | 2–6, 6–7^{(2–7)} |
| Loss | 20–20 | Aug 2012 | Ecuador F1, Guayaquil | Futures | Hard | (Venezuela) Luis David Martinez | (Ecuador) Emilio Gómez (Ecuador) Roberto Quiroz | 4–6, 6–7^{(4–7)} |
| Win | 21–20 | May 2013 | Mexico F6, Puebla | Futures | Hard | (Mexico) Alan Nunez Aguilera | (Barbados) Darian King (Puerto Rico) Alex Llompart | 6–4, 6–1 |
| Loss | 21–21 | May 2013 | Mexico F9, Morelia | Futures | Hard | (Mexico) Alan Nunez Aguilera | (Mexico) Manuel Sanchez (Canada) Pavel Krainik | 7–6^{(7–5)}, 2–6, [5–10] |
| Loss | 21–22 | Sep 2014 | Mexico F11, Tehuacan | Futures | Hard | (Mexico) Antonio Ruiz-Rosales | (Mexico) Mauricio Astorga (Mexico) Alberto Rojas-Maldonado | 6–3, 4–6, [8–10] |

== Sources ==
- Miguel Gallardo Valles at the Association of Tennis Professionals
- Miguel Gallardo Valles at World Tennis
