= Bruno Echagaray =

Mexican tennis player (born 1983)

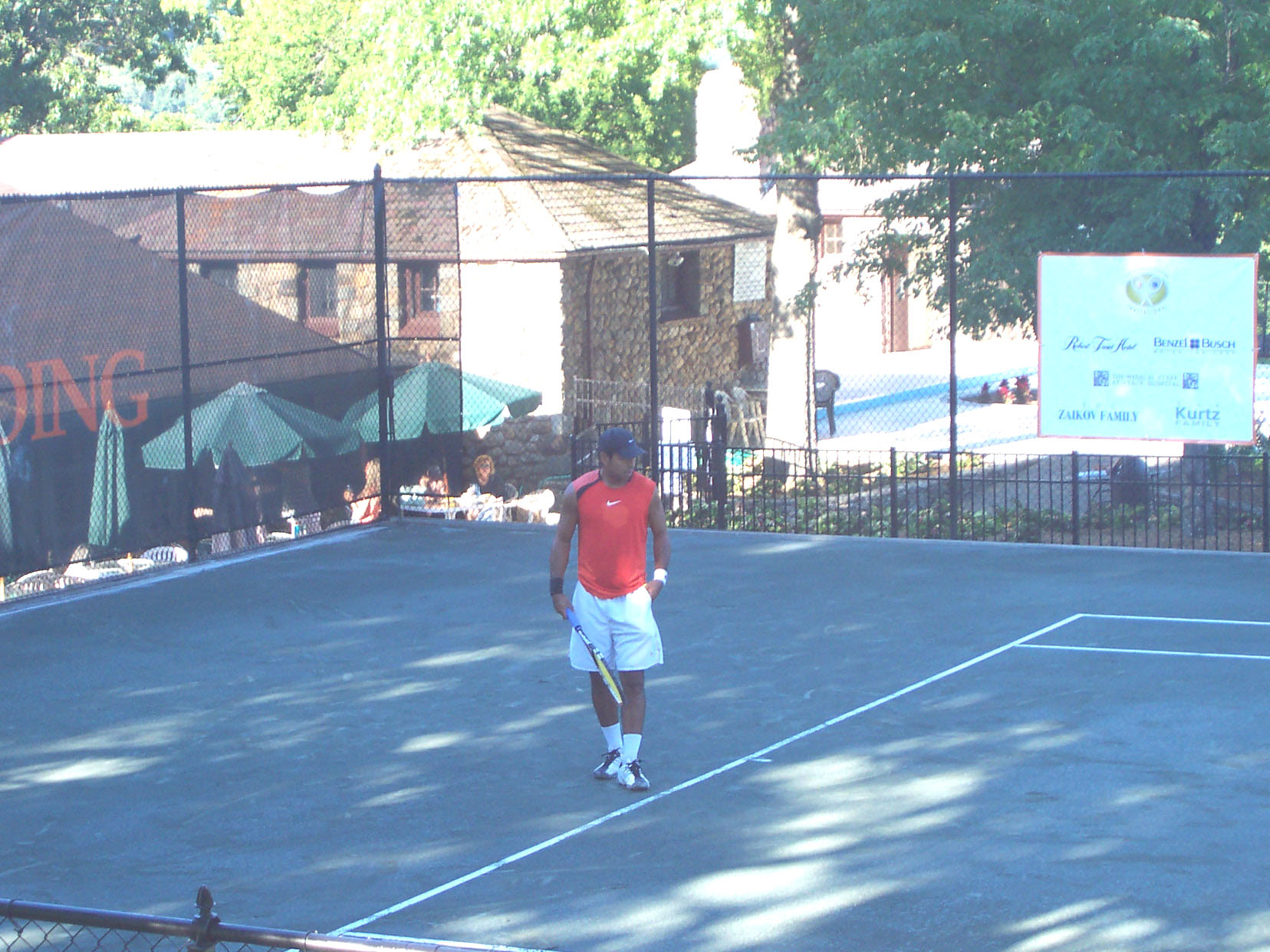
- Country (sports): Mexico
- Residence: Mexico City, Mexico
- Born: 8 May 1983 (age 42) Mexico City, Mexico
- Height: 1.83 m (6 ft 0 in)
- Turned pro: 2000
- Retired: 2010
- Plays: Right-handed (one-handed backhand)
- Prize money: $223,013

Singles
- Career record: 4–9
- Career titles: 0
- Highest ranking: No. 156 (18 June 2007)

Grand Slam singles results
- French Open: Q1 (2007, 2009)
- Wimbledon: Q1 (2009)
- US Open: 1R (2007)

Doubles
- Career record: 7–14
- Career titles: 0
- Highest ranking: No. 162 (7 June 2004)
- Last updated on: 10 July 2023.

Bruno Echagaray (born 8 May 1983 in Mexico City) is a former Mexican tennis player.

He was the most well-known Mexican tennis player in 2006. He reached as high as 156 in the world for singles, and 162 for doubles. Most of his wins came on carpet, mostly because of his speed. He played a lot in the Davis Cup for Mexico. Since his retirement he has coached players including Canadian Rebecca Marino.

== Junior Grand Slam finals ==
=== Doubles: 1 (1 runner-up) ===
Result	Year	Tournament	Surface	Partner	Opponents	Score
Loss	2001	Wimbledon	Grass	(Mexico) Santiago González	(Canada) Frank Dancevic (Ecuador) Giovanni Lapentti	1–6, 4–6

== ATP Challenger and ITF Futures finals ==
=== Singles: 20 (6–14) ===
Legend ATP Challenger (1–5) ITF Futures (5–9)	Finals by surface Hard (6–10) Clay (0–4) Grass (0–0) Carpet (0–0)

Result	W–L	Date	Tournament	Tier	Surface	Opponent	Score
Loss	0–1	Jun 2000	Mexico F1, Guadalajara	Futures	Clay	(Mexico) Alejandro Hernández	3–6, 4–6
Loss	0–2	Jun 2002	Mexico F9, Ixtapa	Futures	Hard	(Mexico) Miguel Gallardo Valles	3–6, 2–6
Loss	0–3	Jun 2002	Mexico F10, Bahias de Huatulco	Futures	Hard	(Argentina) Carlos Berlocq	3–6, 6–1, 3–6
Loss	0–4	Jun 2003	Mexico F6, Loreto	Futures	Hard	(Brazil) Júlio Silva	3–6, 6–4, 3–6
Loss	0–5	May 2004	Mexico F4, Ciudad Obregón	Futures	Hard	(Mexico) Alejandro Hernández	5–7, 0–6
Loss	0–6	Jun 2004	France F9, Toulon	Futures	Clay	(Argentina) Carlos Berlocq	3–6, 1–6
Loss	0–7	Sep 2004	Mexico F10, Comitán	Futures	Hard	(Canada) Andrew Piotrowski	6–7^{(6–8)}, 4–6
Loss	0–8	Oct 2004	USA F26, Irvine	Futures	Hard	(Austria) Zbynek Mlynarik	1–6, 1–6
Win	1–8	Oct 2005	Mexico F14, Monterrey	Futures	Hard	(Mexico) Víctor Romero	7–6^{(10–8)}, 6–2
Win	2–8	Oct 2005	Mexico F16, Mazatlán	Futures	Hard	(Canada) Pierre-Ludovic Duclos	6–3, 6–4
Loss	2–9	Nov 2005	Puebla, Mexico	Challenger	Hard	(United States) Hugo Armando	6–2, 3–6, 6–7^{(1–7)}
Win	3–9	Jul 2006	USA F14, Chico	Futures	Hard	(United States) John Isner	7–6^{(9–7)}, 7–5
Loss	3–10	Jul 2006	Bogotá, Colombia	Challenger	Clay	(Colombia) Santiago Giraldo	3–6, 6–1, 2–6
Loss	3–11	Aug 2006	Joinville, Brazil	Challenger	Clay	(Brazil) André Ghem	1–6, 4–6
Win	4–11	Jan 2007	USA F2, Miami	Futures	Hard	(Serbia) Dušan Vemić	6–2, 6–7^{(5–7)}, 7–5
Win	5–11	Feb 2007	Mexico F1, Mexico City	Futures	Hard	(France) Pierrick Ysern	6–4, 7–5
Loss	5–12	Apr 2007	Mexico City, Mexico	Challenger	Hard	(France) Jo-Wilfried Tsonga	4–6, 6–2, 1–6
Loss	5–13	Aug 2007	Bronx, United States	Challenger	Hard	(United States) Sam Warburg	3–6, 7–6^{(7–5)}, 3–6
Win	6–13	Mar 2008	León, Mexico	Challenger	Hard	(Brazil) Ricardo Mello	3–6, 6–0, 7–6^{(8–6)}
Loss	6–14	May 2009	Mexico F4, Coatzacoalcos	Futures	Hard	(Mexico) César Ramírez	3–6, 7–5, 2–6

=== Doubles: 37 (22–15) ===
Legend ATP Challenger (2–4) ITF Futures (20–11)	Finals by surface Hard (16–14) Clay (6–1) Grass (0–0) Carpet (0–0)

Result	W–L	Date	Tournament	Tier	Surface	Partner	Opponents	Score
Win	1–0	Jun 2000	Mexico F2, Campeche	Futures	Hard	(Mexico) Santiago González	(United States) Jack Brasington (Mexico) Jorge Haro	6–2, 4–6, 6–0
Win	2–0	Nov 2001	Mexico F11, León	Futures	Hard	(Mexico) Santiago González	(Republic of Ireland) John Doran (Australia) Andrew Painter	7–6^{(7–5)}, 7–6^{(8–6)}
Win	3–0	Mar 2002	Mexico F1, Chetumal	Futures	Hard	(Mexico) Santiago González	(Argentina) Gustavo Marcaccio (Argentina) Patricio Rudi	1–6, 6–1, 6–0
Win	4–0	Mar 2002	Mexico F3, Aguascalientes	Futures	Clay	(Mexico) Santiago González	(Argentina) Juan Pablo Brzezicki (Cuba) Lazaro Navarro-Batles	6–4, 7–5
Loss	4–1	May 2002	Mexico F7, Loreto	Futures	Hard	(Mexico) Santiago González	(United States) Alex Bogomolov Jr. (United States) Trace Fielding	3–6, 6–7^{(4–7)}
Win	5–1	Jun 2002	Mexico F9, Ixtapa	Futures	Hard	(Mexico) Santiago González	(Argentina) Rodolfo Daruich (Argentina) Lionel Noviski	6–3, 6–3
Loss	5–2	Aug 2002	Mexico F12, Tuxtla Gutiérrez	Futures	Hard	(Mexico) Santiago González	(Japan) Hiroki Kondo (Venezuela) Kepler Orellana	walkover
Win	6–2	Sep 2002	Mexico F13, Celaya	Futures	Clay	(Mexico) Santiago González	(Cuba) Ricardo Chile-Fonte (Mexico) German Maldonado-Pinto	6–7^{(5–7)}, 6–4, 6–1
Loss	6–3	Nov 2002	Mexico F16, Ciudad Juárez	Futures	Clay	(Mexico) Santiago González	(Venezuela) José de Armas (Argentina) Ignacio Gonzalez-King	5–7, 3–6
Win	7–3	Nov 2002	Mexico F17, Zacatecas	Futures	Hard	(Mexico) Santiago González	(Chile) Adrián García (Argentina) Ignacio Gonzalez-King	7–6^{(7–0)}, 6–1
Loss	7–4	Mar 2003	USA F5, Harlingen	Futures	Hard	(United States) Travis Rettenmaier	(South Africa) Raven Klaasen (United States) Huntley Montgomery	walkover
Win	8–4	Jun 2003	Mexico F6, Loreto	Futures	Hard	(Mexico) Santiago González	(Brazil) Bruno Soares (Brazil) Thiago Alves	walkover
Loss	8–5	Jun 2003	Mexico F7, Loreto	Futures	Hard	(Mexico) Santiago González	(Brazil) Bruno Soares (Brazil) Thiago Alves	6–4, 3–6, 4–6
Win	9–5	Jun 2003	Mexico F8, Torreón	Futures	Hard	(Mexico) Guillermo Carter	(Mexico) Marcello Amador (Mexico) Miguel Gallardo Valles	6–4, 3–6, 6–3
Win	10–5	Jul 2003	Mexico F10, Acapulco	Futures	Clay	(Mexico) Rodrigo Echagaray	(Mexico) Guillermo Carter (Mexico) Miguel Gallardo Valles	5–7, 6–1, 7–6^{(7–5)}
Win	11–5	Sep 2003	Mexico F14, Querétaro	Futures	Hard	(United States) Huntley Montgomery	(Mexico) Santiago González (Mexico) Alejandro Hernández	1–6, 6–1, 7–5
Loss	11–6	Sep 2003	Mexico City, Mexico	Challenger	Hard	(Netherlands Antilles) Jean-Julien Rojer	(United States) Huntley Montgomery (United States) Andres Pedroso	7–6^{(7–3)}, 5–7, 4–6
Win	12–6	Oct 2003	Mexico F18, Ciudad Obregón	Futures	Hard	(Argentina) Gustavo Marcaccio	(Brazil) Ronaldo Carvalho (Brazil) Lucas Engel	6–4, 3–6, 7–5
Win	13–6	Nov 2003	Mexico F20, León	Futures	Hard	(Mexico) Jorge Haro	(Mexico) Alejandro Hernández (Mexico) Gerardo Venegas-Escalente	4–3 ret.
Win	14–6	Apr 2004	León, Mexico	Challenger	Hard	(Mexico) Miguel Gallardo Valles	(Canada) Frédéric Niemeyer (United States) Tripp Phillips	6–4, 7–6^{(7–1)}
Win	15–6	May 2004	Mexico F6, Celaya	Futures	Hard	(Mexico) Jorge Haro	(Brazil) Marcelo Melo (Brazil) Gabriel Pitta	default
Loss	15–7	Sep 2004	Mexico F10, Comitán	Futures	Hard	(Mexico) Miguel Gallardo Valles	(Mexico) Víctor Romero (Israel) Michael Kogan	7–5, 3–6, 6–7^{(8–10)}
Win	16–7	Oct 2004	Mexico F15, Ciudad Obregón	Futures	Hard	(Mexico) Miguel Gallardo Valles	(Argentina) Guillermo Carry (Finland) Lauri Kiiski	6–3, 3–6, 7–6^{(7–5)}
Loss	16–8	Aug 2005	Gramado, Brazil	Challenger	Hard	(Argentina) Brian Dabul	(United States) Mirko Pehar (United States) Goran Dragicevic	3–6, 4–6
Loss	16–9	Oct 2005	Mexico F13, Torreón	Futures	Hard	(Mexico) Carlos Palencia	(Poland) Michal Domanski (Poland) Dawid Olejniczak	4–6, 4–6
Loss	16–10	Oct 2005	Mexico F15, Ciudad Obregón	Futures	Hard	(Mexico) Carlos Palencia	(United States) Jonathan Chu (United States) Alberto Francis	6–2, 6–7^{(5–7)}, 2–6
Loss	16–11	Oct 2005	Mexico F16, Mazatlán	Futures	Hard	(Mexico) Daniel Langre	(United Kingdom) Richard Irwin (Poland) Dawid Olejniczak	6–7^{(4–7)}, 0–6
Win	17–11	Mar 2006	Mexico F3, Chetumal	Futures	Hard	(Mexico) Carlos Palencia	(Slovenia) Miha Gregorc (Mexico) Mario Vergara	6–2, 6–1
Loss	17–12	Mar 2006	Mexico F4, Cancún	Futures	Hard	(Mexico) Carlos Palencia	(Dominican Republic) Jhonson Garcia (Venezuela) Yohny Romero	3–6, 2–6
Win	18–12	May 2006	Mexico F7, Guadalajara	Futures	Clay	(Canada) Pierre-Ludovic Duclos	(Mexico) Víctor Romero (Mexico) Eduardo Peralta-Tello	6–3, 6–3
Win	19–12	Jul 2006	USA F14, Chico	Futures	Hard	(Mexico) Daniel Garza	(United States) John Isner (United States) Robbye Poole	6–4, 6–4
Loss	19–13	Nov 2006	Puebla, Mexico	Challenger	Hard	(Romania) Horia Tecău	(Mexico) Daniel Garza (Netherlands Antilles) Jean-Julien Rojer	7–6^{(8–6)}, 3–6, [7–10]
Win	20–13	Feb 2007	Mexico F1, Mexico City	Futures	Hard	(Slovakia) Aleksandar Vlaski	(Argentina) Juan-Pablo Amado (Argentina) Andrés Molteni	6–4, 7–5
Win	21–13	Jun 2007	Furth, Germany	Challenger	Clay	(Brazil) André Ghem	(Italy) Fabio Fognini (Portugal) Fred Gil	7–6^{(7–1)}, 4–6, [13–11]
Loss	21–14	Nov 2007	Puebla, Mexico	Challenger	Hard	(Mexico) Santiago González	(Poland) Dawid Olejniczak (Australia) Raphael Durek	2–6, 6–7^{(6–8)}
Loss	21–15	Oct 2009	Mexico F11, Monterrey	Futures	Hard	(Mexico) Daniel Garza	(United States) Brett Joelson (United States) Ashwin Kumar	4–6, 2–6
Win	22–15	Nov 2009	Mexico F14, Guadalajara	Futures	Clay	(Mexico) Miguel Gallardo Valles	(Canada) Vasek Pospisil (United States) Ashwin Kumar	3–6, 6–2, [10–6]
