= Carlos Palencia =

Mexican tennis player (born 1981)

- Country (sports): Mexico
- Born: 22 August 1981 (age 44)
- Plays: Right-handed (two-handed backhand)
- Prize money: $44,206

Singles
- Career record: 2–1 (at ATP Tour level, Grand Slam level, and in Davis Cup)
- Career titles: 0; 0 Challenger, 3 Futures
- Highest ranking: No. 435 (22 May 2006) \

Doubles
- Career record: 0–0 (at ATP Tour level, Grand Slam level, and in Davis Cup)
- Career titles: 0; 1 Challenger, 14 Futures
- Highest ranking: No. 269 (30 July 2007)
- Last updated on: 30 October 2021.

Carlos Palencia (born 22 August 1981) is a Mexican tennis player.

Palencia has a career high ATP singles ranking of 435 achieved on 22 May 2006. He also has a career high ATP doubles ranking of 269 achieved on 30 July 2007.

Palencia has 1 ATP Challenger Tour title at the 2007 Torneo Internacional Challenger León.

== ATP Challenger and ITF Futures finals ==
=== Singles: 7 (3–4) ===
Legend ATP Challenger (0–0) ITF Futures (3–4)	Finals by surface Hard (2–3) Clay (1–1) Grass (0–0) Carpet (0–0)

Result	W–L	Date	Tournament	Tier	Surface	Opponent	Score
Loss	0–1	May 2004	Mexico F6A, Coatzacoalcos	Futures	Hard	(Brazil) Eduardo Bohrer	2–6, 6–3, 1–6
Loss	0–2	May 2005	Mexico F6, Aguascalientes	Futures	Clay	(Australia) Raphael Durek	6–7^{(4–7)}, 3–6
Win	1–2	May 2005	Mexico F7, Morelia	Futures	Hard	(Mexico) Santiago Gonzalez	6–3, 2–6, 6–4
Loss	1–3	Aug 2005	Mexico F11, Tijuana	Futures	Hard	(United States) Jason Marshall	2–6, 5–7
Loss	1–4	Aug 2006	Venezuela F2, Caracas	Futures	Hard	(Venezuela) Yohny Romero	4–6, 3–6
Win	2–4	Oct 2006	Mexico F16, Ciudad Obregon	Futures	Hard	(United States) Peter Shults	4–6, 6–0, 6–3
Win	3–4	May 2007	Mexico F4, Guadalajara	Futures	Clay	(Mexico) Victor Romero	5–7, 7–6^{(7–3)}, 7–6^{(7–1)}

=== Doubles: 32 (15–17) ===
Legend ATP Challenger (1–0) ITF Futures (14–17)	Finals by surface Hard (11–13) Clay (4–4) Grass (0–0) Carpet (0–0)

Result	W–L	Date	Tournament	Tier	Surface	Partner	Opponents	Score
Loss	0–1	Jun 2004	Mexico F8, Torreón	Futures	Hard	(Brazil) Rodrigo-Antonio Grilli	(Brazil) Eduardo Bohrer (Brazil) Andre Ghem	6–3, 1–6, 6–7^{(1–7)}
Loss	0–2	Aug 2004	Spain F17, Xàtiva	Futures	Clay	(Mexico) Eduardo Magadan-Castro	(Spain) J-M Rodriguez (Spain) Arkaitz Ugarte	3–6, 3–6
Loss	0–3	Oct 2004	Mexico F12, Torreón	Futures	Hard	(Mexico) Daniel Garza	(Mexico) Victor Romero (Israel) Michael Kogan	1–6, 2–6
Loss	0–4	Apr 2005	Mexico F3, Guadalajara	Futures	Clay	(Mexico) Pablo Martinez	(South Africa) Andrew Anderson (South Africa) Roger Anderson	4–6, 1–6
Win	1–4	May 2005	Mexico F4, Celaya	Futures	Hard	(Mexico) Pablo Martinez	(United States) David Loewenthal (United States) Nicholas Monroe	6–4, 6–4
Win	2–4	May 2005	Mexico F7, Morelia	Futures	Hard	(Mexico) Pablo Martinez	(Mexico) Alfonso Perez-Villegas (Mexico) Rolando Vargas	6–1, 6–3
Loss	2–5	Aug 2005	Mexico F10, Monterrey	Futures	Hard	(United States) Chris Kwon	(Canada) Sanjin Sadovich (United States) Carl Thorsen	3–6, 6–2, 6–7^{(3–7)}
Loss	2–6	Oct 2005	Mexico F13, Torreón	Futures	Hard	(Mexico) Bruno Echagaray	(Poland) Michal Domanski (Poland) Dawid Olejniczak	4–6, 4–6
Loss	2–7	Oct 2005	Mexico F15, Ciudad Obregon	Futures	Hard	(Mexico) Bruno Echagaray	(United States) Jonathan Chu (United States) Alberto Francis	6–2, 6–7^{(5–7)}, 2–6
Win	3–7	Mar 2006	Mexico F3, Chetumal	Futures	Hard	(Mexico) Bruno Echagaray	(Slovenia) Miha Gregorc (Mexico) Mario Vergara	6–2, 6–1
Loss	3–8	Mar 2006	Mexico F4, Cancun	Futures	Hard	(Mexico) Bruno Echagaray	(Dominican Republic) Jhonson Garcia (Venezuela) Yohny Romero	3–6, 2–6
Loss	3–9	May 2006	Mexico F8, Los Mochis	Futures	Clay	(Mexico) Miguel Gallardo-Valles	(United States) Michael Johnson (Switzerland) Sven Swinnen	6–4, 3–6, 4–6
Win	4–9	Aug 2006	Venezuela F3, Valencia	Futures	Hard	(Mexico) Miguel Gallardo-Valles	(Austria) Christoph Palmanshofer (United States) Jason Zimmermann	6–0, 6–0
Win	5–9	Aug 2006	Mexico F13, Monterrey	Futures	Clay	(Mexico) Miguel Gallardo-Valles	(United States) Lester Cook (United States) Shane La Porte	6–3, 6–4
Win	6–9	Oct 2006	Mexico F16, Ciudad Obregon	Futures	Hard	(Australia) Raphael Durek	(United States) Stephen Amritraj (France) Ludovic Walter	5–7, 6–3, 6–4
Loss	6–10	Oct 2006	Mexico F17, Ciudad Obregon	Futures	Hard	(Mexico) Miguel Gallardo-Valles	(Canada) Pierre-Ludovic Duclos (Australia) Raphael Durek	2–6, 4–6
Win	7–10	Oct 2006	Mexico F18, Mazatlan	Futures	Hard	(Mexico) Miguel Gallardo-Valles	(Mexico) Victor Romero (Mexico) Bruno Rodriguez	6–2, 6–2
Win	8–10	Jan 2007	El Salvador F1, Santa Tecla	Futures	Clay	(Mexico) Miguel Gallardo-Valles	(Guatemala) Cristian Paiz (Romania) Bogdan-Victor Leonte	6–2, 6–3
Loss	8–11	Jan 2007	Guatemala F1, Guatemala City	Futures	Hard	(Mexico) Miguel Gallardo-Valles	(United States) Lester Cook (United States) Shane La Porte	3–6, 5–7
Loss	8–12	Jan 2007	Panama F1, Panama City	Futures	Clay	(Mexico) Miguel Gallardo-Valles	(Argentina) Juan-Pablo Amado (Bolivia) Mauricio Doria-Medina	5–7, 3–6
Win	9–12	Apr 2007	Mexico City, Mexico	Challenger	Hard	(Mexico) Miguel Gallardo-Valles	(United States) Brendan Evans (United States) Brian Wilson	6–3, 6–3
Win	10–12	May 2007	Mexico F3, Cordoba	Futures	Hard	(Mexico) Miguel Gallardo-Valles	(United States) Joel Kielbowicz (United States) Brad Pomeroy	6–1, 6–4
Win	11–12	May 2007	Mexico F4, Guadalajara	Futures	Clay	(Mexico) Miguel Gallardo-Valles	(United States) Nicholas Monroe (United States) Brad Pomeroy	6–4, 6–2
Win	12–12	Jun 2007	USA F12, Loomis	Futures	Hard	(Mexico) Miguel Gallardo-Valles	(United States) Scoville Jenkins (United States) Nikita Kryvonos	6–3, 6–2
Loss	12–13	Oct 2007	Mexico F10, Ciudad Obregon	Futures	Hard	(Mexico) Fernando Cabrera	(United States) Joel Kielbowicz (United States) Ross Wilson	6–7^{(3–6)}, 3–6
Loss	12–14	Nov 2007	Mexico F11, Ciudad Obregon	Futures	Hard	(Mexico) Fernando Cabrera	(Germany) Martin Emmrich (Switzerland) David-Philipp Stojan	2–6, 5–7
Loss	12–15	Nov 2007	Mexico F12, Mazatlan	Futures	Hard	(Mexico) Fernando Cabrera	(Canada) Philip Bester (United States) Glenn Weiner	3–6, 2–6
Loss	12–16	Apr 2008	Mexico F4, Cordoba	Futures	Hard	(Mexico) Santiago Gonzalez	(United Kingdom) Neil Bamford (United Kingdom) Josh Goodall	0–0 ret
Win	13–16	Sep 2008	Mexico F9, Metepec	Futures	Hard	(Mexico) Miguel Gallardo-Valles	(Mexico) Juan-Manuel Elizondo (Mexico) Manuel Sanchez	6–4, 6–4
Loss	13–17	May 2009	Mexico F3, Cordoba	Futures	Hard	(Mexico) Santiago Gonzalez	(Mexico) Cesar Ramirez (Mexico) Juan-Manuel Elizondo	4–6, 7–5, [10–12]
Win	14–17	May 2009	Mexico F6, Guadalajara	Futures	Clay	(Mexico) Miguel Gallardo-Valles	(Mexico) Antonio Ruiz-Rosales (Mexico) Fernando Cabrera	6–4, 6–3
Win	15–17	May 2010	Mexico F2, Cordoba	Futures	Hard	(Mexico) Santiago Gonzalez	(Mexico) Miguel Gallardo-Valles (Mexico) Pablo Martinez	5–7, 7–6^{(7–4)}, [10–8]
