= Víctor Romero =

Mexican tennis player

- Country (sports): Mexico
- Born: 26 January 1979 (age 47) Mexico City, Mexico
- Plays: Right-handed
- Prize money: $67,460

Singles
- Career record: 1–0
- Career titles: 0; 0 Challenger, 7 Futures
- Highest ranking: No. 395 (11 June 2007)

Doubles
- Career record: 2–0
- Career titles: 0; 0 Challenger, 13 Futures
- Highest ranking: No. 309 (4 April 2005)
- Last updated on: 21 June 2021.

Víctor Romero (born 26 January 1979) is a Mexican former professional tennis player.

== Biography ==
Romero grew up in Mexico City and was a top-50 ITF junior. Before turning professional he played college tennis in the United States for Tulane University, a private university in New Orleans, Louisiana. He represented Mexico at the 2005 Summer Universiade and won a mixed doubles silver medal.

On the professional tour he reached a best singles ranking of 395 in the world. As a doubles player he was runner-up in two ATP Challenger tournaments, both in 2006. He won 20 ITF satellite tournaments, 7 in singles and 13 in doubles.

Romero was a men's doubles bronze medalist for Mexico at the 2007 Pan American Games in Rio de Janeiro, partnering Santiago González.

During his career he featured in four Davis Cup ties for his native country and retired unbeaten, from one singles and three doubles rubbers.

Romero emigrated with his family to New Zealand in 2010. His wife, whom he met while at Tulane University, is a New Zealander.

== ATP Challenger and ITF Futures finals ==
=== Singles: 14 (7–7) ===
Legend ATP Challenger (0–0) ITF Futures (7–7)	Finals by surface Hard (6–6) Clay (1–1) Grass (0–0) Carpet (0–0)

Result	W–L	Date	Tournament	Tier	Surface	Opponent	Score
Win	1–0	Aug 2002	Mexico F12, Tuxtla Gutiérrez	Futures	Hard	(Canada) Matt Klinger	6–4, 7–6^{(7–5)}
Win	2–0	Sep 2004	Mexico F11, Mexico City	Futures	Hard	(Mexico) Santiago González	2–6, 7–6^{(7–5)}, 7–6^{(10–8)}
Loss	2–1	Oct 2005	Mexico F14, Monterrey	Futures	Hard	(Mexico) Bruno Echagaray	6–7^{(8–10)}, 2–6
Win	3–1	Nov 2005	Mexico F17, León	Futures	Hard	(Italy) Riccardo Ghedin	6–3, 7–5
Loss	3–2	Jul 2006	Mexico F10, Comitán	Futures	Hard	(Cuba) Lazaro Navarro-Batles	1–6, 0–6
Loss	3–3	May 2007	Mexico F4, Guadalajara	Futures	Clay	(Mexico) Carlos Palencia	7–5, 6–7^{(3–7)}, 6–7^{(1–7)}
Loss	3–4	May 2007	Mexico F5, Celaya	Futures	Hard	(United States) Nicholas Monroe	0–6, 2–6
Win	4–4	May 2008	Mexico F5, Guadalajara	Futures	Clay	(Australia) Marinko Matosevic	6–4, 6–2
Win	5–4	May 2008	Mexico F6, Celaya	Futures	Hard	(El Salvador) Rafael Arévalo	7–5, 7–5
Win	6–4	Feb 2009	Mexico F2, Naucalpan	Futures	Hard	(Italy) Adriano Biasella	6–7^{(2–7)}, 6–2, 6–1
Loss	6–5	May 2010	Mexico F3, Mexico City	Futures	Hard	(Mexico) Miguel Gallardo Valles	4–6, 3–6
Win	7–5	May 2010	Mexico F4, Celaya	Futures	Hard	(United States) Adam El Mihdawy	4–6, 6–3, 6–2
Loss	7–6	Nov 2010	Mexico F9, Durango	Futures	Hard	(Moldova) Roman Borvanov	3–6, 4–6
Loss	7–7	Apr 2012	Mexico F4, Mexico City	Futures	Hard	(Mexico) César Ramírez	2–6, 4–6

=== Doubles: 20 (13–7) ===
Legend ATP Challenger (0–2) ITF Futures (13–5)	Finals by surface Hard (11–3) Clay (2–4) Grass (0–0) Carpet (0–0)

Result	W–L	Date	Tournament	Tier	Surface	Partner	Opponents	Score
Win	1–0	Sep 1998	Bolivia F1, La Paz	Futures	Clay	(Brazil) Pedro Braga	(United States) Keith Brill (Brazil) Paulo Taicher	4–6, 7–6, 7–6
Loss	1–1	Aug 1999	Spain F4, Gandia	Futures	Clay	(Spain) JL Condor-Fernandez	(Australia) Tim Crichton (Australia) Todd Perry	4–6, 1–6
Win	2–1	Nov 1999	Mexico F7, León	Futures	Hard	(Mexico) Marco Osorio	(Brazil) Flávio Saretta (Brazil) Leonardo Silva	7–6, 6–3
Win	3–1	Sep 2004	Mexico F10, Comitán	Futures	Hard	(Israel) Michael Kogan	(Mexico) Bruno Echagaray (Mexico) Miguel Gallardo Valles	5–7, 6–3, 7–6^{(10–8)}
Win	4–1	Oct 2004	Mexico F12, Torreón	Futures	Hard	(Israel) Michael Kogan	(Mexico) Carlos Palencia (Mexico) Daniel Garza	6–1, 6–2
Win	5–1	Oct 2004	Mexico F13, Monterrey	Futures	Hard	(Israel) Michael Kogan	(United Kingdom) David Brewer (United Kingdom) Richard Irwin	6–3, 6–2
Win	6–1	Oct 2004	USA F30, Baton Rouge	Futures	Hard	(Israel) Michael Kogan	(France) Julien Cassaigne (Canada) Philip Gubenco	6–3, 6–1
Win	7–1	Nov 2004	Mexico F16, León	Futures	Hard	(Mexico) Daniel Langre	(Poland) Dawid Olejniczak (Poland) Piotr Szczepanik	7–6^{(7–4)}, 7–5
Loss	7–2	Feb 2005	Mexico F1, Naucalpan	Futures	Hard	(Mexico) Miguel Ángel Reyes-Varela	(Mexico) Santiago González (Mexico) Alejandro Hernández	4–6, 2–6
Win	8–2	Feb 2005	Mexico F2, Casablanca Satelite	Futures	Hard	(Mexico) Daniel Langre	(Mexico) Daniel Garza (Mexico) Marco Osorio	6–4, 4–6, 6–3
Win	9–2	Sep 2005	Mexico F12, Puerto Vallarta	Futures	Hard	(Mexico) Daniel Garza	(Australia) Scott Doerner (United States) Jason Zimmermann	6–4, 7–6^{(7–5)}
Loss	9–3	Jan 2006	Mexico F1, Naucalpan	Futures	Hard	(Mexico) Daniel Langre	(United States) Nicholas Monroe (United States) Sam Warburg	6–3, 4–6, 4–6
Loss	9–4	Apr 2006	Aguascalientes, Mexico	Challenger	Clay	(Mexico) Hector Almada	(Argentina) Juan Martín del Potro (Argentina) Martín Vassallo Argüello	5–7, 5–7
Loss	9–5	Apr 2006	San Luis Potosí, Mexico	Challenger	Clay	(Mexico) Hector Almada	(Mexico) Daniel Garza (Poland) Dawid Olejniczak	2–6, 2–6
Loss	9–6	May 2006	Mexico F7, Guadalajara	Futures	Clay	(Mexico) Eduardo Peralta-Tello	(Canada) Pierre-Ludovic Duclos (Mexico) Bruno Echagaray	3–6, 3–6
Loss	9–7	Oct 2006	Mexico F18, Mazatlán	Futures	Hard	(Mexico) Bruno Rodríguez	(Mexico) Carlos Palencia (Mexico) Miguel Gallardo Valles	2–6, 2–6
Win	10–7	Nov 2006	Mexico F20, Querétaro	Futures	Hard	(Mexico) Bruno Rodríguez	(Colombia) Pablo Gonzalez (Mexico) Daniel Garza	6–1, 5–7, 7–6^{(7–3)}
Win	11–7	Nov 2007	Mexico F13, Querétaro	Futures	Hard	(Mexico) Bruno Rodríguez	(United States) Joel Kielbowicz (United States) Ross Wilson	6–3, 6–4
Win	12–7	Nov 2008	Mexico F15, Guadalajara	Futures	Clay	(Mexico) Bruno Rodríguez	(Mexico) Juan Manuel Elizondo (Mexico) César Ramírez	4–6, 6–2, [10–8]
Win	13–7	Nov 2010	Mexico F9, Durango	Futures	Hard	(Moldova) Roman Borvanov	(United States) Maciek Sykut (United States) Denis Zivkovic	6–3, 6–4

== See also ==
- List of Mexico Davis Cup team representatives
