= Guillermo Carter =

Mexican tennis player

Guillermo Carter Garibaldi
- Full name: Guillermo Carter Garibaldi
- Country (sports): Mexico
- Born: 7 April 1977 (age 48) Guadalajara, Mexico
- Height: 1.90 m (6 ft 3 in)

Guillermo Carter Garibaldi (born 7 April 1977) is a Mexican former professional tennis player.

Carter, who comes from Guadalajara, earned national junior tennis championships twice in mexico. Played collegiate tennis for the University of Oregon and earned All-American singles honors in 2000, becoming the first ever tennis player in history from the University of Oregon to achieve that honor. He represented the Mexico Davis Cup team in a 2003 winning both his singles and doubles rubber. His career included an ATP Tour doubles main draw appearance at the 2003 Mexican Open in Acapulco. He played professional tennis for 2 years and had his best world rankings of 467 in 2003.

== ITF Futures titles ==
=== Doubles: (2) ===
No.	Date	Tournament	Surface	Partner	Opponents	Score
1.	May 2003	Mexico F5, Ciudad Obregón	Hard	(Mexico) Santiago González	(Mexico) Álvaro Domínguez (Mexico) Juan Manuel Elizondo	7–6^{(4)}, 6–3
2.	Jun 2003	Mexico F8, Torreón	Hard	(Mexico) Bruno Echagaray	(Mexico) Marcello Amador (Mexico) Miguel Gallardo Valles	6–4, 3–6, 6–3

== See also ==
- List of Mexico Davis Cup team representatives
