= Bruno Rodríguez (tennis) =

Mexican tennis player

- Country (sports): Mexico
- Born: 28 October 1986 (age 39)
- Plays: Right-Handed (two-handed backhand)
- Prize money: $63,073

Singles
- Career record: 4–2
- Career titles: 0
- Highest ranking: No. 364 (17 May 2010)

Doubles
- Career record: 2–0
- Career titles: 0
- Highest ranking: No. 359 (24 September 2012)
- Last updated on: 27 March 2018.

Bruno Rodríguez (born 28 October 1986) is a Mexican former tennis player.

Rodríguez has a career-high ATP singles ranking of 364, achieved on May 17, 2010. He also has a career-high doubles ranking of 359, achieved on 24 September 2012.

He made his main draw debut on the ATP World Tour at the 2008 Abierto Mexicano Telcel in Acapulco as a wild card. He has been a member of the Mexico Davis Cup team between 2008 and 2012.

== ATP Challenger and ITF Futures finals ==
=== Singles: 7 (1–6) ===
ATP Challenger (0–0)
ITF Futures (1–6)

Result	W–L	Date	Tournament	Tier	Surface	Opponent	Score
Loss	0–1	Jul 2006	Mexico City, Mexico	Futures	Hard	(Cuba) Lázaro Navarro-Batles	6–4, 3–6, 4–6
Loss	0–2	Sep 2007	Móstoles, Spain	Futures	Hard	(Spain) Tati Rascón	6–3, 3–6, 6–7^{(1–7)}
Loss	0–3	Sep 2007	Madrid, Spain	Futures	Hard	(Spain) Miguel Ángel López Jaén	4–6, 6–4, 6–7^{(5–7)}
Loss	0–4	May 2009	Córdoba, Mexico	Futures	Hard	(Mexico) Santiago González	4–6, 4–6
Win	1–4	Jun 2009	León, Mexico	Futures	Hard	(Mexico) Miguel Gallardo Valles	6–3, 7–6^{(9–7)}
Loss	1–5	Oct 2009	Mansfield, United States	Futures	Hard	(Spain) Arnau Brugués Davi	0–6, 3–6
Loss	1–6	May 2010	Córdoba, Mexico	Futures	Hard	(Mexico) Santiago González	7–6^{(7–1)}, 2–6, 2–6

=== Doubles: 20 (7–13) ===
ATP Challenger (0–1)
ITF Futures (7–12)

Result	W–L	Date	Tournament	Tier	Surface	Partner	Opponents	Score
Loss	0–1	Nov 2005	Querétaro, Mexico	Futures	Hard	(Mexico) Miguel Ángel Reyes-Varela	(Sweden) Mikael Ekman (Sweden) Carl-Henrik Hansen	3–6, 2–6
Loss	0–2	Jul 2006	Mexico City, Mexico	Futures	Hard	(Mexico) Miguel Ángel Reyes-Varela	(United States) Michael Johnson (Cuba) Lázaro Navarro-Batles	4–6, 6–4, 2–6
Win	1–2	Aug 2006	Tuxtla Gutiérrez, Mexico	Futures	Hard	(Mexico) Miguel Ángel Reyes-Varela	(Argentina) Alejandro Correa (United States) Geoffrey Gehrke	6–4, 6–2
Loss	1–3	Oct 2006	Mazatlán, Mexico	Futures	Hard	(Mexico) Víctor Romero	(Mexico) Miguel Gallardo Valles (Mexico) Carlos Palencia	2–6, 2–6
Win	2–3	Nov 2006	Querétaro, Mexico	Futures	Hard	(Mexico) Víctor Romero	(Mexico) Daniel Garza (Colombia) Pablo González	6–1, 5–7, 7–6^{(7–3)}
Loss	2–4	Apr 2007	Zaragoza, Spain	Futures	Clay (i)	(Argentina) Juan-Pablo Amado	(Spain) Miguel Ángel López Jaén (Spain) Jordi Marsé-Vidri	1–6, 2–6
Loss	2–5	May 2007	Jablonec nad Nisou, Czech Republic	Futures	Clay	(Canada) Érik Chvojka	(Czech Republic) Jan Mašík (Czech Republic) Jaroslav Pospíšil	5–7, 5–7
Loss	2–6	Jul 2007	Römerberg, Germany	Futures	Clay	(Jamaica) Dustin Brown	(Germany) Andre Begemann (Germany) Lars Pörschke	1–6, 6–4, 3–6
Win	3–6	Nov 2007	Querétaro, Mexico	Futures	Hard	(Mexico) Víctor Romero	(United States) Joel Kielbowicz (United States) Ross Wilson	6–3, 6–4
Loss	3–7	Apr 2008	Loja, Spain	Futures	Clay	(Spain) Andoni Vivanco-Guzmán	(Spain) Pedro Clar-Rosselló (Spain) Guillermo Olaso	6–7^{(5–7)}, 3–6
Win	4–7	Nov 2008	Guadalajara, Mexico	Futures	Clay	(Mexico) Víctor Romero	(Mexico) Juan Manuel Elizondo (Mexico) César Ramírez	4–6, 6–2, [10–8]
Win	5–7	Feb 2010	Mexico City, Mexico	Futures	Hard	(Mexico) Daniel Garza	(Mexico) Luis Díaz Barriga (Mexico) Miguel Ángel Reyes-Varela	6–4, 7–5
Loss	5–8	Aug 2010	Zacatecas, Mexico	Futures	Hard	(Guatemala) Christopher Díaz Figueroa	(Mexico) Juan Manuel Elizondo (Mexico) César Ramírez	4–6, 7–6^{(7–2)}, [4–10]
Loss	5–9	Dec 2011	Guadalajara, Mexico	Futures	Clay	(Mexico) Manuel Sánchez	(Mexico) Luis Díaz Barriga (United States) Adam El Mihdawy	3–6, 3–6
Loss	0–1	Apr 2012	León, Mexico	Challenger	Hard	(Mexico) César Ramírez	(Australia) John Peers (Australia) John-Patrick Smith	3–6, 3–6
Loss	5–10	May 2012	Guadalajara, Mexico	Futures	Clay	(Mexico) Miguel Ángel Reyes-Varela	(United States) Devin Britton (Barbados) Darian King	3–6, 7–5, [4–10]
Win	6–10	May 2012	Morelia, Mexico	Futures	Hard	(Mexico) Miguel Ángel Reyes-Varela	(New Zealand) Marvin Barker (Australia) Chris Letcher	6–4, 6–2
Win	7–10	Jun 2012	Unterföhring, Germany	Futures	Clay	(Mexico) Miguel Ángel Reyes-Varela	(Germany) Dominik Meffert (Germany) Michael Spegel	3–6, 6–2, [10–7]
Loss	7–11	Aug 2012	Friedberg, Germany	Futures	Clay	(Mexico) Miguel Ángel Reyes-Varela	(Australia) Dane Propoggia (New Zealand) Rubin Statham	1–6, 4–6
Loss	7–12	Aug 2012	Rotterdam, Netherlands	Futures	Clay	(Mexico) Miguel Ángel Reyes-Varela	(Netherlands) Stephan Fransen (Austria) Gerald Melzer	3–6, 6–7^{(3–7)}
