= Alejandro Hernández (tennis) =

Mexican tennis player

Alejandro Hernández Julia
- Country (sports): Mexico
- Born: 1 October 1977 (age 48) Tijuana, Mexico
- Height: 5 ft 11 in (180 cm)
- Turned pro: 1995
- Retired: 2005
- Plays: Right-handed
- Prize money: $456,412

Singles
- Career record: 33–40
- Career titles: 0; 2 Challenger, 6 Futures
- Highest ranking: No. 125 (24 February 1997)

Grand Slam singles results
- Australian Open: Q3 (1995)
- French Open: Q1 (1996, 1998, 1999, 2004, 2005)
- Wimbledon: 1R (1999)
- US Open: Q3 (1997, 1999, 2001)

Doubles
- Career record: 6–16
- Career titles: 0; 15 Challenger, 3 Futures
- Highest ranking: No. 115 (13 December 2004)

Grand Slam doubles results
- Australian Open: 2R (2000)
- Wimbledon: Q2 (1998)
- US Open: Q2 (1999, 2000)

Other doubles tournaments
- Olympic Games: 1R (1996)

Team competitions
- Last updated on: 7 July 2021.

Alejandro Hernández Julia (Latin American Spanish: [aleˈxandɾo eɾˈnandes ˈxulja]; born October 1, 1977) is a former tennis player from Mexico. Hernández reached his highest ATP singles ranking of world No. 125 on 24 February 1997.

== Career ==
Hernández turned professional in 1995.

A right-hander, he represented his native country at the 1996 Summer Olympics in Atlanta, where he was defeated in the first round.

== Junior Grand Slam finals ==
=== Doubles: 1 (1 runner-up) ===
Result	Year	Tournament	Surface	Partner	Opponents	Score
Loss	1995	Wimbledon	Grass	(Argentina) Mariano Puerta	(United Kingdom) Martin Lee (United Kingdom) James Trotman	6–7, 4–6

== ATP Challenger and ITF Futures finals ==
=== Singles: 17 (8–9) ===
Legend ATP Challenger (2–5) ITF Futures (6–4)	Finals by surface Hard (5–7) Clay (3–2) Grass (0–0) Carpet (0–0)

Result	W–L	Date	Tournament	Tier	Surface	Opponent	Score
Loss	0–1	Jul 1996	São Paulo, Brazil	Challenger	Hard	(Brazil) Roberto Jabali	2–6, 6–4, 1–6
Win	1–1	Nov 1996	Puebla, Mexico	Challenger	Hard	(United States) Alex Reichel	7–6, 7–6
Win	2–1	Sep 1997	Guadalajara, Mexico	Challenger	Clay	(Canada) Bobby Kokavec	6–4, 5–7, 6–2
Loss	2–2	Aug 1998	Tijuana, Mexico	Challenger	Hard	(Australia) Michael Hill	5–7, 1–6
Loss	2–3	Nov 1999	Puebla, Mexico	Challenger	Hard	(United States) Michael Sell	6–7, 5–7
Loss	2–4	May 2000	Armonk, United States	Challenger	Clay	(Spain) Salvador Navarro	1–6, 6–3, 3–6
Win	3–4	Jun 2000	Mexico F1, Guadalajara	Futures	Clay	(Mexico) Bruno Echagaray	6–3, 6–4
Loss	3–5	Jun 2000	Denver, United States	Challenger	Hard	(Israel) Lior Mor	3–6, 4–6
Loss	3–6	May 2001	Mexico F3, Aguascalientes	Futures	Hard	(Mexico) Miguel Gallardo Valles	3–6, 2–6
Loss	3–7	May 2001	Mexico F4, Guadalajara	Futures	Clay	(Canada) Frédéric Niemeyer	1–6, 4–6
Win	4–7	Nov 2001	Mexico F11, León	Futures	Hard	(Australia) Andrew Painter	6–4, 6–4
Loss	4–8	Mar 2002	Mexico F2, Mexico City	Futures	Hard	(Socialist Federal Republic of Yugoslavia) Janko Tipsarević	5–7, 6–7^{(4–7)}
Loss	4–9	Sep 2003	Mexico F14, Querétaro	Futures	Hard	(Argentina) Gustavo Marcaccio	7–6^{(8–6)}, 2–6, 4–6
Win	5–9	Mar 2004	Mexico F2, Naucalpan	Futures	Hard	(Mexico) Miguel Gallardo Valles	6–4, 6–4
Win	6–9	May 2004	Mexico F4, Ciudad Obregón	Futures	Hard	(Mexico) Bruno Echagaray	7–5, 6–0
Win	7–9	May 2004	Mexico F5, Guadalajara	Futures	Clay	(Brazil) Marcelo Melo	6–1, 6–3
Win	8–9	Nov 2004	Mexico F16, León	Futures	Hard	(Mexico) Miguel Gallardo Valles	7–5, 6–4

=== Doubles: 31 (18–13) ===
Legend ATP Challenger (15–10) ITF Futures (3–3)	Finals by surface Hard (14–11) Clay (4–2) Grass (0–0) Carpet (0–0)

Result	W–L	Date	Tournament	Tier	Surface	Partner	Opponents	Score
Loss	0–1	Feb 1996	Punta Del Este, Uruguay	Challenger	Clay	(Germany) Simon Touzil	(Brazil) Gustavo Kuerten (Brazil) Jaime Oncins	7–5, 4–6, 6–7
Win	1–1	Apr 1996	Sliema, Malta	Challenger	Hard	(Mexico) Óscar Ortiz	(North Macedonia) Aleksandar Kitinov (Germany) Martin Zumpft	6–2, 3–6, 6–1
Win	2–1	Jul 1996	São Paulo, Brazil	Challenger	Hard	(Mexico) Óscar Ortiz	(Portugal) João Cunha-Silva (France) Jean-Philippe Fleurian	6–2, 7–6
Win	3–1	Apr 1997	Puerto Vallarta, Mexico	Challenger	Hard	(Mexico) Óscar Ortiz	(United States) Francisco Montana (United States) Jack Waite	4–6, 6–2, 6–1
Loss	3–2	Sep 1997	Guadalajara, Mexico	Challenger	Clay	(Mexico) Óscar Ortiz	(Brazil) Nelson Aerts (Brazil) André Sá	6–3, 2–6, 4–6
Loss	3–3	Feb 1998	West Bloomfield, United States	Challenger	Hard	(Mexico) David Roditi	(United States) Jim Thomas (Italy) Laurence Tieleman	6–7, 4–6
Win	4–3	Nov 1998	Puebla, Mexico	Challenger	Hard	(Mexico) Mariano Sánchez	(Mexico) Bernardo Martínez (Japan) Gouichi Motomura	7–6, 7–6
Win	5–3	Nov 1998	Toluca, Mexico	Challenger	Clay	(Mexico) Mariano Sánchez	(Netherlands) Edwin Kempes (Netherlands) Rogier Wassen	6–3, 6–4
Loss	5–4	Aug 1999	Segovia, Spain	Challenger	Hard	(Czech Republic) Ota Fukárek	(Switzerland) Roger Federer (Netherlands) Sander Groen	4–6, 6–7
Win	6–4	Aug 1999	Bronx, United States	Challenger	Hard	(South Africa) Jeff Coetzee	(United States) Rob Givone (United States) Glenn Weiner	6–4, 6–1
Win	7–4	Oct 1999	Tulsa, United States	Challenger	Hard	(South Africa) Jeff Coetzee	(United States) James Blake (United States) Thomas Blake	6–2, 6–1
Loss	7–5	Jun 2001	Salvador, Brazil	Challenger	Hard	(Croatia) Ivo Karlović	(Brazil) Adriano Ferreira (Brazil) Daniel Melo	6–1, 3–6, 6–7^{(3–7)}
Win	8–5	Jul 2001	Campos do Jordão, Brazil	Challenger	Hard	(Brazil) André Sá	(Brazil) Ricardo Mello (Brazil) Ricardo Schlachter	6–7^{(6–8)}, 7–6^{(7–5)}, 7–5
Loss	8–6	Nov 2001	Mexico F12, Zacatecas	Futures	Hard	(Germany) Alexander Waske	(Cuba) Sandor Martinez-Breijo (Cuba) Lazaro Navarro-Batles	walkover
Win	9–6	Jul 2002	Campos do Jordão, Brazil	Challenger	Hard	(Brazil) Daniel Melo	(Chinese Taipei) Yen-Hsun Lu (Thailand) Danai Udomchoke	walkover
Win	10–6	Nov 2002	Puebla, Mexico	Challenger	Hard	(Mexico) Miguel Gallardo Valles	(United States) Diego Ayala (United States) Robert Kendrick	6–1, 5–7, 7–6^{(7–3)}
Loss	10–7	Apr 2003	León, Mexico	Challenger	Hard	(United States) Alex Bogomolov Jr.	(Czech Republic) Ota Fukárek (Australia) Jordan Kerr	6–4, 3–6, 4–6
Loss	10–8	Sep 2003	Gramado, Brazil	Challenger	Hard	(Mexico) Santiago González	(Brazil) Marcos Daniel (Brazil) Alexandre Simoni	6–7^{(5–7)}, 4–6
Loss	10–9	Sep 2003	Mexico F14, Querétaro	Futures	Hard	(Mexico) Santiago González	(Mexico) Bruno Echagaray (United States) Huntley Montgomery	6–1, 1–6, 5–7
Loss	10–10	Nov 2003	Mexico F20, León	Futures	Hard	(Mexico) Gerardo Venegas-Escalente	(Mexico) Bruno Echagaray (Mexico) Jorge Haro	3–4 ret.
Win	11–10	Nov 2003	Puebla, Mexico	Challenger	Hard	(Mexico) Santiago González	(United States) Andres Pedroso (United States) Huntley Montgomery	6–4, 2–6, 6–4
Win	12–10	Mar 2004	Mexico F2, Naucalpan	Futures	Hard	(Mexico) Miguel Gallardo Valles	(Mexico) Marcello Amador (Mexico) Federico Contreras-Rodriguez	7–6^{(7–1)}, 6–4
Loss	12–11	Jun 2004	Andorra la Vella, Andorra	Challenger	Hard	(Mexico) Santiago González	(Luxembourg) Gilles Müller (Pakistan) Aisam Qureshi	3–6, 5–7
Win	13–11	Jul 2004	São Paulo, Brazil	Challenger	Hard	(Brazil) André Sá	(Brazil) Henrique Mello (Brazil) Ricardo Mello	6–4, 6–4
Loss	13–12	Jul 2004	Campos do Jordão, Brazil	Challenger	Hard	(Brazil) André Sá	(Peru) Iván Miranda (Brazil) Ricardo Mello	3–6, 4–6
Win	14–12	Oct 2004	Quito, Ecuador	Challenger	Clay	(Mexico) Santiago González	(Poland) Łukasz Kubot (Germany) Frank Moser	2–6, 6–2, 6–4
Win	15–12	Oct 2004	Colombia F4, Bogotá	Futures	Clay	(Mexico) Santiago González	(Argentina) Diego Junqueira (Argentina) Martín Alund	6–3, 6–4
Win	16–12	Nov 2004	Puebla, Mexico	Challenger	Hard	(Mexico) Santiago González	(Mexico) Miguel Gallardo Valles (Argentina) Gustavo Marcaccio	6–3, 6–4
Win	17–12	Dec 2004	Guadalajara, Mexico	Challenger	Clay	(Mexico) Santiago González	(Spain) Rubén Ramírez Hidalgo (Argentina) Sergio Roitman	7–6^{(7–5)}, 1–6, 6–3
Win	18–12	Feb 2005	Mexico F1, Naucalpan	Futures	Hard	(Mexico) Santiago González	(Mexico) Miguel Ángel Reyes-Varela (Mexico) Víctor Romero	6–4, 6–2
Loss	18–13	Nov 2005	Puebla, Mexico	Challenger	Hard	(Mexico) Santiago González	(Austria) Werner Eschauer (Germany) Alexander Satschko	1–6, 4–6

== Performance timeline ==
Key
W	F	SF	QF	#R	RR	Q#	DNQ	A	NH

(W) winner; (F) finalist; (SF) semifinalist; (QF) quarterfinalist; (#R) rounds 4, 3, 2, 1; (RR) round-robin stage; (Q#) qualification round; (DNQ) did not qualify; (A) absent; (NH) not held; (SR) strike rate (events won / competed); (W–L) win–loss record.

=== Singles ===
Tournament	1995	1996	1997	1998	1999	2000	2001	2002	2003	2004	2005	SR	W–L	Win %
Grand Slam tournaments
Australian Open	Q1	Q3	Q2	A	A	Q2	A	Q1	A	A	A	0 / 0	0–0	–
French Open	A	Q1	A	Q1	Q1	A	A	A	A	Q1	Q1	0 / 0	0–0	–
Wimbledon	Q1	A	A	Q3	1R	Q2	Q2	Q1	A	Q1	Q1	0 / 1	0–1	0%
US Open	A	Q2	Q3	A	Q3	Q1	Q3	A	A	Q1	A	0 / 0	0–0	–
Win–loss	0–0	0–0	0–0	0–0	0–1	0–0	0–0	0–0	0–0	0–0	0–0	0 / 1	0–1	0%
ATP Tour Masters 1000
Indian Wells	A	A	Q1	A	A	A	A	A	A	A	A	0 / 0	0–0	–
Miami Masters	A	Q3	1R	A	Q1	A	A	A	A	A	A	0 / 1	0–1	0%
Win–loss	0–0	0–0	0–1	0–0	0–0	0–0	0–0	0–0	0–0	0–0	0–0	0 / 1	0–1	0%
