= Santiago González (tennis) =

Mexican tennis player

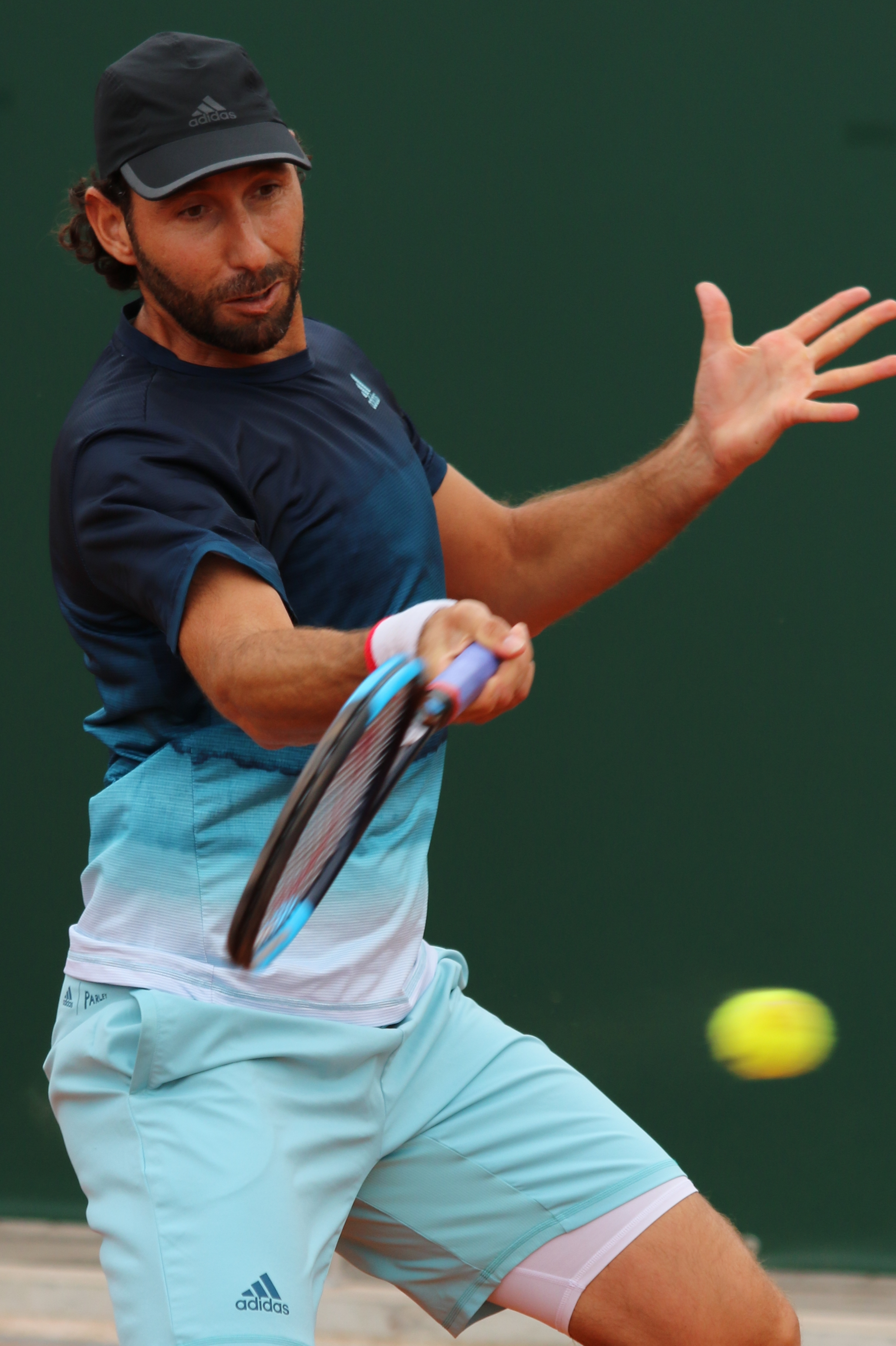
- González at the 2019 French Open
- Country (sports): Mexico
- Residence: Córdoba, Mexico
- Born: 24 February 1983 (age 43) Córdoba, Mexico
- Height: 1.91 m (6 ft 3 in)
- Turned pro: 2001
- Plays: Right-handed (two-handed backhand)
- Prize money: US$ 5,689,622

Singles
- Career record: 9–13
- Career titles: 0
- Highest ranking: No. 155 (22 May 2006)

Grand Slam singles results
- Australian Open: Q1 (2009)
- French Open: Q2 (2004, 2010)
- Wimbledon: 1R (2009)
- US Open: Q2 (2009)

Doubles
- Career record: 458–416
- Career titles: 25
- Highest ranking: No. 7 (13 November 2023)
- Current ranking: No. 106 (16 November 2026)

Grand Slam doubles results
- Australian Open: QF (2012, 2020)
- French Open: F (2017)
- Wimbledon: 3R (2011, 2019, 2022, 2023)
- US Open: 3R (2012, 2021, 2023)

Other doubles tournaments
- Tour Finals: SF (2023)
- Olympic Games: 2R (2016)

Grand Slam mixed doubles results
- Australian Open: 2R (2013, 2015, 2022)
- French Open: F (2012)
- Wimbledon: F (2024)
- US Open: F (2013, 2014)
Medal record
Pan American Games
Gold medal – first place	2003 Santo Domingo	Doubles
Gold medal – first place	2011 Guadalajara	Mixed doubles
Bronze medal – third place	2007 Rio de Janeiro	Doubles
Central American and Caribbean Games
Gold medal – first place	2002 San Salvador	Doubles
Gold medal – first place	2002 San Salvador	Team Event
Gold medal – first place	2014 Veracruz	Mixed doubles
Silver medal – second place	2002 San Salvador	Mixed doubles
Silver medal – second place	2014 Veracruz	Doubles
- Last updated on: 21 January 2026.

Santiago González Torre (Latin American Spanish: [sanˈtjaɣo ɣonˈsales ˈtore]; (Note: In isolation, González is pronounced [ɡonˈsales].) born 24 February 1983) is a Mexican professional tennis player. His career-high ATP ranking is World No. 7 in doubles, achieved on 13 November 2023. He has won 25 ATP doubles titles. In 2017, he reached the French Open final in doubles along with his partner Donald Young. Additionally, he has reached the finals of four other Grand Slam tournaments in the Mixed category: the 2013 French Open, the 2014 and 2015 US Open, and the 2024 Wimbledon. González represents Mexico at the Davis Cup competition; currently his record is 31–19 as of end of 2023 season. His career-high ranking in singles is No. 155, achieved on 22 May 2006.

== Career ==
=== 2009–10: Major singles debut, Top 100 & First ATP title in doubles ===
González qualified at the 2009 Wimbledon Championships to make his Grand Slam debut. He lost his first round main draw match in Wimbledon against Israeli Dudi Sela. He also made his Grand Slam debut in qualifications in singles at the 2009 Australian Open. He made his top 100 doubles debut on 12 October 2009.

He won his first ATP title at the 2010 Serbia Open partnering American Travis Rettenmaier.

=== 2011–14: Eight doubles titles, top 25 debut ===
In April 2011, partnering with American Scott Lipsky, he won the ATP World Tour 500 title of the Barcelona Open. They defeated the Bryan brothers 5–7, 6–2, [12–10], breaking their 10-match winning streak. They also defeated doubles teams Jürgen Melzer & Nenad Zimonjić 6–3, 6–2, and Max Mirnyi & Daniel Nestor 7–6, 6–4. He reached the top 25 on 30 January 2012. He won a total of seven titles with Lipsky between 2011 and 2014.

=== 2017: French Open doubles final ===
In June 2017, he reached his first Grand Slam final partnering Donald Young of the US at the French Open.

=== 2021: Fifteenth title ===
In 2021, González and his then partner Marcelo Demoliner took the first dose of a COVID-19 vaccine at the 2021 Serbia Open. During the grass season, he won his fourteenth ATP title at Stuttgart Open defeating Uruguayan Ariel Behar and Gonzalo Escobar from Ecuador with Demoliner.

In September, González won his fifteenth ATP doubles title at the 2021 Astana Open partnering Andrés Molteni. In November he won the 2021 Stockholm Open his sixteenth title also with Molteni.

=== 2022–23: 350th ATP career win, First two Masters, World No. 7 ===
In 2022, he won two more clay titles with Molteni at the 2022 Córdoba Open and 2022 Argentina Open.

He made his maiden Masters final at the 2022 BNP Paribas Open in Indian Wells with Édouard Roger-Vasselin using a protected ranking after defeating reigning US Open Champions and 2nd seeded pair of Joe Salisbury and Rajeev Ram. They lost in the final to American duo Isner/Sock. As a result, he reached a new doubles career-high of No. 22 on 21 March 2022.

Unseeded he reached his second Masters final at the 2023 Miami Open with Édouard Roger-Vasselin after defeating Americans Jackson Withrow and Nathaniel Lammons, recording his 350th ATP career win. He won his first Masters title and 20th overall defeating Nicolas Mahut and Austin Krajicek. He made his debut in the top 20 on 24 April 2023. Following the 2023 French Open, he made his debut in the top 15 on 12 June 2023. In August, he won the 2023 Los Cabos Open, his twenty-first title also with Édouard Roger-Vasselin.

In October, he won the 2023 Basel Open, his twenty-second title. With reaching the final at the 2023 Rolex Paris Masters, his second at this level for the season, he entered the top 10 in the rankings. He won the title with Roger-Vasselin defeating Bopanna/Ebden.

On 2 November, Gonzalez qualified with Roger-Vasselin for the 2023 ATP Finals for the first time in his career and became the first Mexican to qualify for the year-end event since Jorge Lozano in 1989. They reached the semifinals after winning their round robin matches against M. Gonzalez/A. Molteni and I. Dodig/A. Krajicek.

=== 2024: Historic mixed doubles final at Wimbledon ===
At the 2024 Wimbledon Championships, he reached his fourth career final in mixed doubles with compatriot Giuliana Olmos. They became the first Mexican duo to reach the mixed doubles final. Gonzalez became the first Mexican man since Raúl Ramírez in 1973 to reach the final of the same event at the All England Club. They lost in the final in straight sets to Jan Zieliński and Hsieh Su-wei.

== Significant finals ==
=== Grand Slam finals ===
==== Doubles: 1 (1 runner-up) ====
Result	Year	Championship	Surface	Partner	Opponents	Score
Loss	2017	French Open	Clay	(United States) Donald Young	(United States) Ryan Harrison (New Zealand) Michael Venus	6–7^{(5–7)}, 7–6^{(7–4)}, 3–6

==== Mixed doubles: 4 (4 runner-ups) ====
Result	Year	Championship	Surface	Partner	Opponents	Score
Loss	2012	French Open	Clay	(Poland) Klaudia Jans-Ignacik	(India) Sania Mirza (India) Mahesh Bhupathi	6–7^{(3–7)}, 1–6
Loss	2013	US Open	Hard	(United States) Abigail Spears	(Czech Republic) Andrea Hlaváčková (Belarus) Max Mirnyi	6–7^{(5–7)}, 3–6
Loss	2014	US Open	Hard	(United States) Abigail Spears	(India) Sania Mirza (Brazil) Bruno Soares	1–6, 6–2, [9–11]
Loss	2024	Wimbledon	Grass	(Mexico) Giuliana Olmos	(Poland) Jan Zieliński (Chinese Taipei) Hsieh Su-wei	4–6, 2–6

=== Masters 1000 finals ===
==== Doubles: 3 (2 titles, 1 runner-up) ====
Result	Year	Tournament	Surface	Partner	Opponents	Score
Loss	2022	Indian Wells Masters	Hard	(France) Édouard Roger-Vasselin	(United States) John Isner (United States) Jack Sock	6–7^{(4–7)}, 3–6
Win	2023	Miami Open	Hard	(France) Édouard Roger-Vasselin	(United States) Austin Krajicek (France) Nicolas Mahut	7–6^{(7–4)}, 7–5
Win	2023	Paris Masters	Hard (i)	(France) Édouard Roger-Vasselin	(India) Rohan Bopanna (Australia) Matthew Ebden	6–2, 5–7, [10–7]

== ATP Tour finals ==
=== Doubles: 44 (25 titles, 19 runner-ups) ===
Legend Grand Slam tournaments (0–1) ATP World Tour Finals (0–0) ATP World Tour Masters 1000 (2–1) ATP World Tour 500 Series (2–3) ATP World Tour 250 Series (21–13)	Titles by surface Hard (10–10) Clay (9–6) Grass (6–2)	Titles by setting Outdoor (18–13) Indoor (7–5)

Result	W–L	Date	Tournament	Tier	Surface	Partner	Opponents	Score
Win	1–0	May 2010	Serbia Open, Serbia	250 Series	Clay	(United States) Travis Rettenmaier	(Poland) Tomasz Bednarek (Poland) Mateusz Kowalczyk	7–6^{(8–6)}, 6–1
Loss	1–1	Jul 2010	Hall of Fame Tennis Championships, United States	250 Series	Grass	(United States) Travis Rettenmaier	(Australia) Carsten Ball (Australia) Chris Guccione	3–6, 4–6
Win	2–1	Apr 2011	Barcelona Open, Spain	500 Series	Clay	(United States) Scott Lipsky	(United States) Bob Bryan (United States) Mike Bryan	5–7, 6–2, [12–10]
Loss	2–2	May 2011	Open de Nice Côte d'Azur, France	250 Series	Clay	(Spain) David Marrero	(United States) Eric Butorac (Curaçao) Jean-Julien Rojer	3–6, 4–6
Win	3–2	Aug 2011	Austrian Open Kitzbühel, Austria	250 Series	Clay	(Italy) Daniele Bracciali	(Brazil) Franco Ferreiro (Brazil) André Sá	7–6^{(7–1)}, 4–6, [11–9]
Win	4–2	Jul 2012	Hall of Fame Tennis Championships, United States	250 Series	Grass	(United States) Scott Lipsky	(United Kingdom) Colin Fleming (United Kingdom) Ross Hutchins	7–6^{(7–3)}, 6–3
Win	5–2	Aug 2012	Winston-Salem Open, United States	250 Series	Hard	(United States) Scott Lipsky	(Spain) Pablo Andújar (Argentina) Leonardo Mayer	6–3, 4–6, [10–2]
Win	6–2	May 2013	Portugal Open, Portugal	250 Series	Clay	(United States) Scott Lipsky	(Pakistan) Aisam-ul-Haq Qureshi (Netherlands) Jean-Julien Rojer	6–3, 4–6, [10–7]
Win	7–2	Jun 2013	Halle Open, Germany	250 Series	Grass	(United States) Scott Lipsky	(Italy) Daniele Bracciali (Israel) Jonathan Erlich	6–2, 7–6^{(7–3)}
Win	8–2	May 2014	Portugal Open, Portugal (2)	250 Series	Clay	(United States) Scott Lipsky	(Uruguay) Pablo Cuevas (Spain) David Marrero	6–3, 3–6, [10–8]
Win	9–2	May 2014	Düsseldorf Open, Germany	250 Series	Clay	(United States) Scott Lipsky	(Germany) Martin Emmrich (Germany) Christopher Kas	7–5, 4–6, [10–3]
Loss	9–3	Jun 2014	Rosmalen Grass Court Championships, Netherlands	250 Series	Grass	(United States) Scott Lipsky	(Netherlands) Jean-Julien Rojer (Romania) Horia Tecău	3–6, 6–7^{(3–7)}
Win	10–3	Feb 2015	Memphis Open, United States	250 Series	Hard (i)	(Poland) Mariusz Fyrstenberg	(New Zealand) Artem Sitak (United States) Donald Young	5–7, 7–6^{(7–1)}, [10–8]
Loss	10–4	Feb 2015	Mexican Open, Mexico	500 Series	Hard	(Poland) Mariusz Fyrstenberg	(Croatia) Ivan Dodig (Brazil) Marcelo Melo	6–7^{(2–7)}, 7–5, [3–10]
Loss	10–5	Jul 2015	Croatia Open, Croatia	250 Series	Clay	(Poland) Mariusz Fyrstenberg	(Argentina) Máximo González (Brazil) André Sá	6–4, 3–6, [5–10]
Win	11–5	Feb 2016	Memphis Open, United States (2)	250 Series	Hard (i)	(Poland) Mariusz Fyrstenberg	(United States) Steve Johnson (United States) Sam Querrey	6–4, 6–4
Loss	11–6	Apr 2016	U.S. Men's Clay Court Championships, United States	250 Series	Clay	(Dominican Republic) Víctor Estrella Burgos	(United States) Bob Bryan (United States) Mike Bryan	6–4, 3–6, [8–10]
Loss	11–7	Feb 2017	Argentina Open, Argentina	250 Series	Clay	(Spain) David Marrero	(Colombia) Juan Sebastián Cabal (Colombia) Robert Farah	1–6, 4–6
Loss	11–8	Jun 2017	French Open, France	Grand Slam	Clay	(United States) Donald Young	(United States) Ryan Harrison (New Zealand) Michael Venus	6–7^{(5–7)}, 7–6^{(7–4)}, 3–6
Loss	11–9	Oct 2017	European Open, Belgium	250 Series	Hard (i)	(Chile) Julio Peralta	(United States) Scott Lipsky (India) Divij Sharan	4–6, 6–2, [5–10]
Win	12–9	Jun 2018	Antalya Open, Turkey	250 Series	Grass	(Brazil) Marcelo Demoliner	(Netherlands) Sander Arends (Netherlands) Matwé Middelkoop	7–5, 6–7^{6–8}, [10–8]
Loss	12–10	Oct 2018	European Open, Belgium	250 Series	Hard (i)	(Brazil) Marcelo Demoliner	(France) Nicolas Mahut (France) Édouard Roger-Vasselin	4–6, 5–7
Loss	12–11	Feb 2019	New York Open, United States	250 Series	Hard (i)	(Pakistan) Aisam-ul-Haq Qureshi	(Germany) Kevin Krawietz (Germany) Andreas Mies	4–6, 5–7
Win	13–11	Apr 2019	U.S. Men's Clay Court Championships, United States	250 Series	Clay	(Pakistan) Aisam-ul-Haq Qureshi	(United Kingdom) Ken Skupski (United Kingdom) Neal Skupski	3–6, 6–4, [10–6]
Loss	13–12	Jan 2020	Qatar Open, Qatar	250 Series	Hard	(United Kingdom) Luke Bambridge	(India) Rohan Bopanna (Netherlands) Wesley Koolhof	6–3, 2–6, [6–10]
Win	14–12	Jun 2021	Stuttgart Open, Germany	250 Series	Grass	(Brazil) Marcelo Demoliner	(Uruguay) Ariel Behar (Ecuador) Gonzalo Escobar	4–6, 6–3, [10–8]
Win	15–12	Sep 2021	Astana Open, Kazakhstan	250 Series	Hard (i)	(Argentina) Andrés Molteni	(Israel) Jonathan Erlich (Belarus) Andrei Vasilevski	6–1, 6–2
Win	16–12	Nov 2021	Stockholm Open, Sweden	250 Series	Hard (i)	(Argentina) Andrés Molteni	(Pakistan) Aisam-ul-Haq Qureshi (Netherlands) Jean-Julien Rojer	6–2, 6–2
Win	17–12	Feb 2022	Córdoba Open, Argentina	250 Series	Clay	(Argentina) Andrés Molteni	(Slovakia) Andrej Martin (Austria) Tristan-Samuel Weissborn	7–5, 6–3
Win	18–12	Feb 2022	Argentina Open, Argentina	250 Series	Clay	(Argentina) Andrés Molteni	(Italy) Fabio Fognini (Argentina) Horacio Zeballos	6–1, 6–1
Loss	18–13	Mar 2022	Indian Wells Masters, United States	Masters 1000	Hard	(France) Édouard Roger-Vasselin	(United States) John Isner (United States) Jack Sock	6–7^{(4–7)}, 3–6
Loss	18–14	Oct 2022	Tel Aviv Open, Israel	250 Series	Hard (i)	(Argentina) Andrés Molteni	(India) Rohan Bopanna (Netherlands) Matwé Middelkoop	2–6, 4–6
Loss	18–15	Oct 2022	Vienna Open, Austria	500 Series	Hard (i)	(Argentina) Andrés Molteni	(Austria) Alexander Erler (Austria) Lucas Miedler	3–6, 6–7^{(1–7)}
Win	19–15	Feb 2023	Open 13, France	250 Series	Hard (i)	(France) Édouard Roger-Vasselin	(France) Nicolas Mahut (France) Fabrice Martin	4–6, 7–6^{(7–4)}, [10–7]
Win	20–15	Mar 2023	Miami Open, United States	Masters 1000	Hard	(France) Édouard Roger-Vasselin	(France) Nicolas Mahut (United States) Austin Krajicek	7–6^{(7–4)}, 7–5
Win	21–15	Aug 2023	Los Cabos Open, Mexico	250 Series	Hard	(France) Édouard Roger-Vasselin	(Australia) Andrew Harris (Germany) Dominik Koepfer	6–4, 7–5
Win	22–15	Oct 2023	Swiss Indoors, Switzerland	500 Series	Hard (i)	(France) Édouard Roger-Vasselin	(Monaco) Hugo Nys (Poland) Jan Zieliński	6–7^{(8–10)}, 7–6^{(7–3)}, [10–1]
Win	23–15	Oct 2023	Paris Masters, France	Masters 1000	Hard (i)	(France) Édouard Roger-Vasselin	(India) Rohan Bopanna (Australia) Matthew Ebden	6–2, 5–7, [10–7]
Loss	23–16	Feb 2024	Delray Beach Open, United States	250 Series	Hard	(United Kingdom) Neal Skupski	(United Kingdom) Julian Cash (United States) Robert Galloway	7–5, 5–7, [2–10]
Loss	23–17	Mar 2024	Mexican Open, Mexico	500 Series	Hard	(United Kingdom) Neal Skupski	(Monaco) Hugo Nys (Poland) Jan Zieliński	3–6, 2–6
Loss	23–18	Apr 2025	U.S. Men's Clay Court Championships, United States	250 Series	Clay	(Argentina) Federico Agustín Gómez	(Brazil) Fernando Romboli (Australia) John-Patrick Smith	1–6, 4–6
Win	24–18	Jun 2025	Stuttgart Open, Germany	250 Series	Grass	(United States) Austin Krajicek	(United States) Alex Michelsen (United States) Rajeev Ram	6–4, 6–4
Win	25–18	Jun 2025	Mallorca Championships, Spain	250 Series	Grass	(United States) Austin Krajicek	(India) Yuki Bhambri (United States) Robert Galloway	6–1, 1–6, [15–13]
Loss	25–19	Nov 2025	Hellenic Championship, Greece	250 Series	Hard (i)	(Netherlands) David Pel	(Portugal) Francisco Cabral (Austria) Lucas Miedler	6–4, 3–6, [3–10]

== ATP Challenger and ITF Tour finals ==
=== Singles: 17 (9–8) ===
Legend (singles) ATP Challenger Tour (2–2) ITF Futures Tour (7–6)	Titles by surface Hard (8–6) Clay (1–2)

Result	W–L	Date	Tournament	Tier	Surface	Opponent	Score
Win	1–0	Sep 2002	Mexico F13, Celaya	Futures	Clay	(Mexico) Miguel Gallardo Valles	4–6, 6–2, 6–2
Loss	1–1	May 2003	Mexico F5, Ciudad Obregón	Futures	Hard	(Colombia) Pablo González	2–6, 1–6
Win	2–1	Jun 2003	Mexico F7, Los Cabos	Futures	Hard	(Brazil) Franco Ferreiro	6–1, 6–2
Loss	2–2	Sep 2003	Mexico City, Mexico	Challenger	Hard	(Chile) Adrián García	5–7, 3–6
Loss	2–3	Sep 2004	Mexico F11, Mexico City	Futures	Hard	(Mexico) Víctor Romero	6–2, 6–7^{(5–7)}, 6–7^{(8–10)}
Win	3–3	Oct 2004	Mexico F15, Ciudad Obregón	Futures	Hard	(Mexico) Miguel Gallardo Valles	6–4, 6–4
Win	4–3	Nov 2004	Mexico F17, Querétaro	Futures	Hard	(Austria) Zbynek Mlynarik	6–2, 7–6^{(7–5)}
Loss	4–4	May 2005	Mexico F5, Chetumal	Futures	Hard	(Brazil) Felipe Lemos	2–6, 1–6
Loss	4–5	May 2005	Mexico F7, Morelia	Futures	Hard	(Mexico) Carlos Palencia	3–6, 6–2, 4–6
Win	5–5	Aug 2007	Venezuela F1, Valencia	Futures	Hard	(Italy) Adriano Biasella	6–4, 6–3
Loss	5–6	Aug 2007	Venezuela F2, Valencia	Futures	Hard	(Venezuela) Yohny Romero	6–4, 5–7, 1–6
Loss	5–7	May 2008	Colombia F4, Barranquilla	Futures	Clay	(Colombia) Michael Quintero	3–6, 6–7^{(4–7)}
Win	6–7	Aug 2008	Belo Horizonte, Brazil	Challenger	Hard	(Chile) Nicolás Massú	6–4, 6–3
Loss	6–8	Mar 2009	Bogotá, Colombia	Challenger	Clay	(Argentina) Horacio Zeballos	6–7^{(3–7)}, 0–6
Win	7–8	May 2009	Mexico F3, Córdoba	Futures	Hard	(Mexico) Bruno Rodríguez	6–4, 6–4
Win	8–8	Apr 2010	León, Mexico	Challenger	Hard	(Poland) Michał Przysiężny	3–6, 6–1, 7–5
Win	9–8	May 2010	Mexico F2, Córdoba	Futures	Hard	(Mexico) Bruno Rodríguez	6–7^{(1–7)}, 6–2, 6–2

=== Doubles: 77 (48–29) ===
Legend (doubles) ATP Challenger Tour (33–20) ITF Futures Tour (15–9)	Titles by surface Hard (25–21) Clay (20–8) Grass (3–0) Carpet (0–0)

Result	W–L	Date	Tournament	Tier	Surface	Partner	Opponents	Score
Win	1–0	Jun 2000	Mexico F2, Campeche	Futures	Hard	(Mexico) Bruno Echagaray	(United States) Jack Brasington (Mexico) Jorge Haro	6–2, 4–6, 6–0
Win	2–0	Nov 2001	Mexico F11, León	Futures	Hard	(Mexico) Bruno Echagaray	(Republic of Ireland) John Doran (Australia) Andrew Painter	7–6^{(7–5)}, 7–6^{(8–6)}
Win	3–0	Mar 2002	Mexico F1, Chetumal	Futures	Hard	(Mexico) Bruno Echagaray	(Argentina) Gustavo Marcaccio (Argentina) Patricio Rudi	1–6, 6–1, 6–0
Win	4–0	Mar 2002	Mexico F3, Aguascalientes	Futures	Clay	(Mexico) Bruno Echagaray	(Argentina) Juan Pablo Brzezicki (Cuba) Lázaro Navarro-Batles	6–4, 7–5
Loss	4–1	May 2002	Mexico F7, Loreto	Futures	Hard	(Mexico) Bruno Echagaray	(United States) Alex Bogomolov Jr. (United States) Trace Fielding	3–6, 6–7^{(4–7)}
Win	5–1	Jun 2002	Mexico F9, Ixtapa-Zihuatanejo	Futures	Hard	(Mexico) Bruno Echagaray	(Argentina) Rodolfo Daruich (Argentina) Lionel Noviski	6–3, 6–3
Loss	5–2	Aug 2002	Mexico F12, Tuxtla Gutiérrez	Futures	Hard	(Mexico) Bruno Echagaray	(Japan) Hiroki Kondo (Venezuela) Kepler Orellana	w/o
Win	6–2	Sep 2002	Mexico F13, Celaya	Futures	Clay	(Mexico) Bruno Echagaray	(Cuba) Ricardo Chile-Fonte (Mexico) German Maldonado-Pinto	6–7^{(5–7)}, 6–4, 6–1
Loss	6–3	Nov 2002	Mexico F16, Ciudad Juárez	Futures	Clay	(Mexico) Bruno Echagaray	(Venezuela) José de Armas (Argentina) Ignacio González King	5–7, 3–6
Win	7–3	Nov 2002	Mexico F17, Zacatecas	Futures	Hard	(Mexico) Bruno Echagaray	(Chile) Adrián García (Argentina) Ignacio González King	7–6^{(7–0)}, 6–1
Win	8–3	May 2003	Mexico F5, Ciudad Obregón	Futures	Hard	(Mexico) Guillermo Carter	(Mexico) Álvaro Domínguez (Mexico) Juan Manuel Elizondo	7–6^{(7–4)}, 6–3
Loss	8–4	Jun 2003	Colombia F1B, Pereira	Futures	Clay	(Colombia) Pablo González	(Brazil) Marcelo Melo (Brazil) Bruno Soares	3–6, 2–6
Win	9–4	Jun 2003	Mexico F6, Loreto	Futures	Hard	(Mexico) Bruno Echagaray	(Brazil) Thiago Alves (Brazil) Bruno Soares	w/o
Loss	9–5	Jun 2003	Mexico F7, Los Cabos	Futures	Hard	(Mexico) Bruno Echagaray	(Brazil) Thiago Alves (Brazil) Bruno Soares	6–4, 3–6, 4–6
Loss	9–6	Sep 2003	Gramado, Brazil	Challenger	Hard	(Mexico) Alejandro Hernández	(Brazil) Marcos Daniel (Brazil) Alexandre Simoni	6–7^{(5–7)}, 4–6
Loss	9–7	Sep 2003	Mexico F14, Querétaro	Futures	Hard	(Mexico) Alejandro Hernández	(Mexico) Bruno Echagaray (United States) Huntley Montgomery	6–1, 1–6, 5–7
Win	10–7	Nov 2003	Puebla, Mexico	Challenger	Hard	(Mexico) Alejandro Hernández	(United States) Huntley Montgomery (United States) Andres Pedroso	6–4, 2–6, 6–4
Loss	10–8	Jun 2004	Andorra, Andorra	Challenger	Hard	(Mexico) Alejandro Hernández	(Luxembourg) Gilles Müller (Pakistan) Aisam Qureshi	3–6, 5–7
Win	11–8	Aug 2004	Gramado, Brazil	Challenger	Hard	(Brazil) Bruno Soares	(Brazil) Henrique Mello (Brazil) Alexandre Simoni	6–3, 6–3
Win	12–8	Aug 2004	Manta, Ecuador	Challenger	Hard	(Brazil) Marcos Daniel	(United States) Eric Nunez (Venezuela) Jimy Szymanski	3–6, 6–2, 7–6^{(7–5)}
Win	13–8	Sep 2004	Mexico F11, Mexico City	Futures	Hard	(Mexico) Miguel Ángel Reyes-Varela	(Mexico) Juan Manuel Elizondo (Mexico) Óscar Zarzosa	6–3, 6–2
Win	14–8	Oct 2004	Quito, Ecuador	Challenger	Clay	(Mexico) Alejandro Hernández	(Poland) Łukasz Kubot (Germany) Frank Moser	2–6, 6–2, 6–4
Win	15–8	Oct 2004	Colombia F4, Bogotá	Futures	Clay	(Mexico) Alejandro Hernández	(Argentina) Martín Alund (Argentina) Diego Junqueira	6–3, 6–4
Win	16–8	Nov 2004	Puebla, Mexico	Challenger	Hard	(Mexico) Alejandro Hernández	(Mexico) Miguel Gallardo Valles (Argentina) Gustavo Marcaccio	6–3, 6–4
Win	17–8	Dec 2004	Guadalajara, Mexico	Challenger	Clay	(Mexico) Alejandro Hernández	(Spain) Rubén Ramírez Hidalgo (Argentina) Sergio Roitman	7–6^{(7–5)}, 1–6, 6–3
Win	18–8	Feb 2005	Mexico F1, Naucalpan	Futures	Clay	(Mexico) Alejandro Hernández	(Mexico) Miguel Ángel Reyes-Varela (Mexico) Víctor Romero	6–4, 6–2
Win	19–8	Apr 2005	Bogotá, Colombia	Challenger	Clay	(Brazil) Marcos Daniel	(United States) Goran Dragicevic (United States) Mirko Pehar	7–6^{(7–4)}, 6–3
Loss	19–9	Jun 2005	Yuba City, USA	Challenger	Hard	(Brazil) Bruno Soares	(United States) Brandon Coupe (United States) Justin Gimelstob	2–6, 6–3, 6–7^{(1–7)}
Loss	19–10	Jul 2005	Bogotá, Colombia	Challenger	Clay	(Brazil) Marcos Daniel	(Argentina) Brian Dabul (Brazil) Marcelo Melo	4–6, 4–6
Win	20–10	Oct 2005	Bogotá, Colombia	Challenger	Clay	(Brazil) Marcos Daniel	(Portugal) Fred Gil (Brazil) Marcelo Melo	6–2, 7–5
Loss	20–11	Nov 2005	Nashville, USA	Challenger	Hard (i)	(Argentina) Diego Hartfield	(Serbia and Montenegro) Ilija Bozoljac (United States) Brian Wilson	6–7^{(6–8)}, 4–6
Loss	20–12	Nov 2005	Puebla, Mexico	Challenger	Hard	(Mexico) Alejandro Hernández	(Austria) Werner Eschauer (Germany) Alexander Satschko	1–6, 4–6
Win	21–12	Jul 2007	Bogotá, Colombia	Challenger	Clay	(Argentina) Brian Dabul	(Colombia) Pablo González (Argentina) Leonardo Mayer	6–2, 6–2
Win	22–12	Aug 2007	Belo Horizonte, Brazil	Challenger	Hard	(Brazil) Bruno Soares	(Brazil) Márcio Torres (France) Nicolas Tourte	6–7^{(12–14)}, 6–4, [10–5]
Win	23–12	Aug 2007	Venezuela F1, Valencia	Futures	Hard	(Mexico) Daniel Garza	(Colombia) Alejandro González (Chile) Borja Malo-Casado	6–3, 7–6^{(7–2)}
Loss	23–13	Oct 2007	Medellín, Colombia	Challenger	Clay	(Brazil) Bruno Soares	(Uruguay) Pablo Cuevas (Argentina) Horacio Zeballos	4–6, 4–6
Loss	23–14	Nov 2007	Puebla, Mexico	Challenger	Hard	(Mexico) Bruno Echagaray	(Australia) Raphael Durek (Poland) Dawid Olejniczak	2–6, 6–7^{(6–8)}
Win	24–14	Feb 2008	Mexico F2, Naucalpan	Futures	Hard	(Mexico) Juan Manuel Elizondo	(United States) Ryler DeHeart (Germany) Alexander Satschko	6–1, 6–1
Loss	24–15	Apr 2008	Mexico F4, Córdoba	Futures	Hard	(Mexico) Carlos Palencia	(United Kingdom) Neil Bamford (United Kingdom) Josh Goodall	0–0 ret.
Loss	24–16	May 2008	Mexico F5, Guadalajara	Futures	Hard	(Mexico) Miguel Gallardo Valles	(New Zealand) G.D. Jones (United States) Nima Roshan	3–6, 6–4, [7–10]
Win	25–16	Aug 2008	Belo Horizonte, Brazil	Challenger	Hard	(Pakistan) Aisam Qureshi	(Brazil) Daniel Dutra da Silva (Brazil) Caio Zampieri	6–3, 7–6^{(7–3)}
Loss	25–17	Nov 2008	Puebla, Mexico	Challenger	Hard	(Mexico) Daniel Garza	(United States) Nicholas Monroe (United States) Eric Nunez	6–4, 3–6, [6–10]
Win	26–17	Apr 2009	San Luis Potosí, Mexico	Challenger	Clay	(Argentina) Horacio Zeballos	(Brazil) Franco Ferreiro (Brazil) Júlio Silva	6–2, 7–6^{(7–5)}
Loss	26–18	May 2009	Mexico F3, Córdoba	Futures	Hard	(Mexico) Carlos Palencia	(Mexico) Juan Manuel Elizondo (Mexico) César Ramírez	4–6, 7–5, [10–12]
Win	27–18	May 2009	Sarasota, USA	Challenger	Clay	(Dominican Republic) Víctor Estrella Burgos	(India) Harsh Mankad (United States) Kaes Van't Hof	6–2, 6–4
Loss	27–19	Jul 2009	Manta, Ecuador	Challenger	Hard	(Argentina) Horacio Zeballos	(Brazil) Ricardo Hocevar (Brazil) André Miele	1–6, 6–2, [7–10]
Win	28–19	Oct 2009	Quito, Ecuador	Challenger	Clay	(United States) Travis Rettenmaier	(Colombia) Michael Quintero (Spain) Fernando Vicente	1–6, 6–3, [10–3]
Loss	28–20	Oct 2009	Sacramento, USA	Challenger	Hard	(United States) Travis Rettenmaier	(United States) Lester Cook (United States) David Martin	6–4, 3–6, [5–10]
Win	29–20	Oct 2009	Calabasas, USA	Challenger	Hard	(Germany) Simon Stadler	(Philippines) Treat Huey (India) Harsh Mankad	6–2, 5–7, [10–4]
Win	30–20	Apr 2010	Bogotá, Colombia	Challenger	Clay	(Brazil) Franco Ferreiro	(Germany) Dominik Meffert (Austria) Philipp Oswald	6–3, 5–7, [10–7]
Win	31–20	Apr 2010	León, Mexico	Challenger	Hard	(Canada) Vasek Pospisil	(Australia) Kaden Hensel (Australia) Adam Hubble	3–6, 6–3, [10–8]
Win	32–20	May 2010	Mexico F2, Córdoba	Futures	Hard	(Mexico) Carlos Palencia	(Mexico) Miguel Gallardo Valles (Mexico) Pablo Martínez	5–7, 7–6^{(7–4)}, [10–8]
Win	33–20	Jun 2010	Rome, Italy	Challenger	Clay	(United States) Travis Rettenmaier	(Australia) Sadik Kadir (India) Purav Raja	6–2, 6–4
Loss	33–21	Jun 2010	Lugano, Switzerland	Challenger	Clay	(United States) Travis Rettenmaier	(Portugal) Fred Gil (Belgium) Christophe Rochus	5–7, 6–7^{(3–7)}
Win	34–21	Nov 2010	Cancún, Mexico	Challenger	Clay	(Dominican Republic) Víctor Estrella Burgos	(Austria) Rainer Eitzinger (Mexico) César Ramírez	6–1, 7–6^{(7–3)}
Loss	34–22	Jan 2011	São Paulo, Brazil	Challenger	Hard	(Argentina) Horacio Zeballos	(Brazil) Franco Ferreiro (Brazil) André Sá	5–7, 6–7^{(12–14)}
Loss	34–23	Mar 2011	San José, Costa Rica	Challenger	Hard	(Mexico) Luis Díaz Barriga	(Colombia) Juan Sebastián Cabal (Colombia) Robert Farah	3–6, 3–6
Loss	34–24	May 2011	Rome, Italy	Challenger	Clay	(United States) Travis Rettenmaier	(Colombia) Juan Sebastián Cabal (Colombia) Robert Farah	6–2, 3–6, [9–11]
Win	35–24	Oct 2011	Aguascalientes, Mexico	Challenger	Clay	(Mexico) Daniel Garza	(Ecuador) Julio César Campozano (Dominican Republic) Víctor Estrella Burgos	6–4, 5–7, [11–9]
Win	36–24	Mar 2012	Dallas, USA	Challenger	Hard	(United States) Scott Lipsky	(United States) Bobby Reynolds (United States) Michael Russell	6–4, 6–3
Win	37–24	Mar 2014	Irving, USA	Challenger	Hard	(United States) Scott Lipsky	(Australia) John-Patrick Smith (New Zealand) Michael Venus	4–6, 7–6^{(9–7)}, [10–7]
Win	38–24	Jan 2016	Canberra, Australia	Challenger	Hard	(Poland) Mariusz Fyrstenberg	(Australia) Maverick Banes (Australia) Jarryd Chaplin	7–6^{(7–3)}, 6–3
Loss	38–25	Mar 2016	Puebla, Mexico	Challenger	Hard	(Croatia) Mate Pavić	(New Zealand) Marcus Daniell (New Zealand) Artem Sitak	6–3, 2–6, [10–12]
Loss	38–26	Mar 2016	Guadalajara, Mexico	Challenger	Hard	(Croatia) Mate Pavić	(Germany) Gero Kretschmer (Germany) Alexander Satschko	3–6, 6–4, [2–10]
Loss	38–27	Mar 2016	San Luis Potosí, Mexico	Challenger	Clay	(Croatia) Mate Pavić	(New Zealand) Marcus Daniell (New Zealand) Artem Sitak	3–6, 6–7^{(4–7)}
Win	39–27	Apr 2016	León, Mexico	Challenger	Hard	(Croatia) Mate Pavić	(Australia) Sam Groth (India) Leander Paes	6–4, 3–6, 13–11
Win	40–27	Mar 2017	Guadalajara, Mexico	Challenger	Hard	(New Zealand) Artem Sitak	(Australia) Luke Saville (Australia) John-Patrick Smith	6–3, 1–6, [10–5]
Loss	40–28	May 2017	Bordeaux, France	Challenger	Clay	(New Zealand) Artem Sitak	(India) Purav Raja (India) Divij Sharan	4–6, 4–6
Win	41–28	Jul 2018	Braunschweig, Germany	Challenger	Clay	(Netherlands) Wesley Koolhof	(India) Sriram Balaji (India) Vishnu Vardhan	6–3, 6–3
Loss	41–29	Apr 2019	Monterrey, Mexico	Challenger	Hard	(Pakistan) Aisam Qureshi	(United States) Evan King (United States) Nathan Pasha	5–7, 2–6
Win	42–29	Jun 2019	Nottingham, Great Britain	Challenger	Grass	(Pakistan) Aisam Qureshi	(China) Gong Maoxin (China) Zhang Ze	4–6, 7–6^{(7–5)}, [10–5]
Win	43–29	Jun 2019	Ilkley, Great Britain	Challenger	Grass	(Pakistan) Aisam Qureshi	(New Zealand) Marcus Daniell (India) Leander Paes	6–3, 6–4
Win	44–29	Sep 2021	Szczecin, Poland	Challenger	Clay	(Argentina) Andrés Molteni	(Sweden) André Göransson (United States) Nathaniel Lammons	2–6, 6–2, [15–13]
Win	45–29	Apr 2025	Mexico City, Mexico	Challenger	Clay	(United States) Austin Krajicek	(United States) Ryan Seggerman (United States) Patrik Trhac	7–6^{(11–9)}, 3–6, [10–5]
Win	46–29	Jun 2025	Nottingham, Great Britain	Challenger	Grass	(United States) Austin Krajicek	(Brazil) Fernando Romboli (Australia) John-Patrick Smith	7–6^{(7–2)}, 6–4
Win	47–29	Aug 2025	Cancun, Mexico	Challenger	Hard	(Netherlands) Jean-Julien Rojer	(France) Manuel Guinard (Brazil) Rafael Matos	7–6^{(7–2)}, 7–5
Win	48–29	Apr 2026	Mexico City, Mexico	Challenger	Clay	(United States) Ryan Seggerman	(Ecuador) Diego Hidalgo (United States) Patrik Trhac	6–4, 4–6, [10–8]

== Doubles performance timeline ==
Key
W	F	SF	QF	#R	RR	Q#	P#	DNQ	A	Z#	PO	G	S	B	NMS	NTI	P	NH

(W) winner; (F) finalist; (SF) semifinalist; (QF) quarterfinalist; (#R) rounds 4, 3, 2, 1; (RR) round-robin stage; (Q#) qualification round; (P#) preliminary round; (DNQ) did not qualify; (A) absent; (Z#) Davis/Fed Cup Zonal Group (with number indication) or (PO) play-off; (G) gold, (S) silver or (B) bronze Olympic/Paralympic medal; (NMS) not a Masters tournament; (NTI) not a Tier I tournament; (P) postponed; (NH) not held; (SR) strike rate (events won / competed); (W–L) win–loss record.
To avoid confusion and double counting, these charts are updated at the conclusion of a tournament or when the player's participation has ended.

Current through the 2026 Paris Masters.

Tournament	2009	2010	2011	2012	2013	2014	2015	2016	2017	2018	2019	2020	2021	2022	2023	2024	2025	2026	SR	W-L
Grand Slam tournaments
Australian Open	A	A	2R	QF	1R	1R	1R	1R	1R	1R	1R	QF	1R	1R	2R	3R	2R	2R	0 / 16	12–16
French Open	A	3R	1R	2R	1R	2R	1R	1R	F	2R	1R	1R	1R	1R	3R	1R	3R	1R	0 / 17	14–17
Wimbledon	1R	2R	3R	2R	2R	2R	2R	2R	1R	2R	3R	NH	1R	3R	3R	2R	1R	1R	0 / 17	16–17
US Open	A	1R	1R	3R	1R	1R	2R	2R	1R	2R	1R	1R	3R	1R	3R	1R	1R	1R	0 / 17	9–17
Win–loss	0–1	3–3	3–4	7–4	1–4	2–4	2–4	2–4	5–4	3–4	2–4	3–3	2–4	2–4	7–4	3–4	3–4	1–4	0 / 67	51–67
Year-end championships
ATP Finals	Did not qualify														SF	Did not qualify			0 / 1	2–2
ATP World Tour Masters 1000
Indian Wells Masters	A	A	A	1R	SF	A	1R	A	A	1R	A	NH	1R	F	SF	1R	A	A	0 / 8	10–8
Miami Open	A	A	A	2R	1R	1R	A	A	A	1R	A	NH	2R	1R	W	1R	A	2R	1 / 9	8–8
Monte-Carlo Masters	A	A	A	1R	A	A	A	A	A	1R	A	NH	A	2R	1R	1R	A	A	0 / 5	1–5
Madrid Open	A	A	A	2R	A	1R	A	A	A	1R	A	NH	A	1R	SF	1R	1R	1R	0 / 8	4–8
Italian Open	A	A	1R	2R	SF	QF	A	A	A	2R	A	A	A	1R	1R	2R	A	2R	0 / 9	9–9
Canadian Open	A	A	A	2R	A	SF	A	A	1R	A	A	NH	A	2R	QF	2R	A	A	0 / 6	8–6
Cincinnati Masters	A	A	A	A	SF	2R	A	A	A	A	A	A	A	SF	SF	2R	A	A	0 / 5	11–5
Shanghai Masters	A	A	A	1R	1R	1R	A	A	QF	A	A	NH			2R	SF	QF	1R	0 / 8	8–8
Paris Masters	A	A	SF	2R	QF	A	A	A	2R	A	A	A	1R	1R	W	1R	1R	A	1 / 8	11–8
Win–loss	0–0	0–0	3–2	5–8	11–6	6–6	0–1	0–0	3–3	1–5	0–0	0–0	1–3	9–8	21–7	6–7	2–2	2–4	2 / 66	69–66
National representation
Summer Olympics	Not Held			A	Not Held			2R	Not Held			A	Not Held			A	Not Held		0 / 1	1–1
Davis Cup	Z2	A	Z1	Z2	Z2	Z2	Z2	Z2	Z2	Z2	Z2	QR	A	Z1	Z1	A	A	A	0 / 13	23–14
Win–loss	1–1	0–0	1–1	3–0	1–0	3–0	1–0	3–1	1–0	3–0	0–1	0–1	0–0	0–1	1–0	0–0	0-0	0-0	0 / 14	24–15
Career Statistics
	2009	2010	2011	2012	2013	2014	2015	2016	2017	2018	2019	2020	2021	2022	2023	2024	2025	2026	Career	
Titles–Finals	0–0	1–2	2–3	2–2	2–2	2–3	1–3	1–2	0–3	1–2	1–2	0–1	3–3	2–5	5–5	0–2	2–3	0–0	25–43	
Overall win–loss	2–3	15–12	33–23	30–27	30–26	29–26	19–18	25–22	26–27	28–28	16–22	8–11	30–26	38–30	53–24	11–9	26–24	11–23	458–416	
Year-end ranking	106	50	28	34	33	36	65	47	28	53	49	47	35	28	11	45	47	106	52.4%	
