= Daniel Garza =

Mexican professional tennis player

- Country (sports): Mexico
- Residence: Monterrey, Mexico
- Born: 8 April 1985 (age 41) Monterrey, Mexico
- Height: 1.71 m (5 ft 7 in)
- Turned pro: 2002
- Plays: Right-handed (one-handed backhand)
- Prize money: US$ 224,875

Singles
- Career record: 16–12
- Career titles: 0; 0 Challenger, 8 Futures
- Highest ranking: No. 294 (16 April 2012)

Doubles
- Career record: 6–7
- Career titles: 0; 5 Challenger, 22 Futures
- Highest ranking: No. 176 (19 March 2007)

Team competitions
- Davis Cup: 22-10
Medal record
Central American and Caribbean Games
Bronze medal – third place	2006 Cartagena	Men's doubles
Gold medal – first place	2010 Mayagüez	Mixed doubles
Silver medal – second place	2010 Mayagüez	Men's singles

Daniel Garza (Latin American Spanish: [daˈnjel ˈɣaɾsa]; (Note: In isolation, Garza is pronounced [ˈɡaɾsa].) born 8 April 1985) is a Mexican professional tennis player.

He participated in the Davis Cup representing Mexico eight times. His most important victory was during the 2008 Davis Cup tie against Uruguay which he won in four sets to Uruguayan Pablo Cuevas on carpet. He has a Davis Cup singles record of 16–8 as well as a doubles record of 6-2 for a combined total of 22–10.

Garza made his ATP tour main draw debut (other than in Davis cup play) at the 2011 Mexican Open where he was granted a wild cart entry. He would go on to lose in the first round to compatriot Santiago González 2-6, 6–7^{(5–7)}. The following year at the 2012 Mexican Open he would repeat his wild card entry, as well as his first round exit, this time at the hands of Łukasz Kubot 1-6, 3–6. For the third consecutive year, he entered the 2013 Mexican Open via wild card, and lost in the first round to Martín Alund 6–7^{(7–9)}, 5–7. His final appearance at the tournament (and in non-Davis cup play) was at the 2015 Mexican Open given another wild card, and losing in the first round to Viktor Troicki 4-6, 3–6.

== Match-fixing scandal ==
In October 2016, Garza was banned for six months and fined $5000 for attempting to match-fix at an ITF tournament in Casabalas, USA.

== Decision Later Appealed ==
Mexican tennis player Daniel Garza successfully appealed penalties to the Court of Arbitration for Sport in a match-fixing case.

The Tennis Integrity Unit made the ruling in April 2017.

The 31-year-old Garza was eligible to resume his playing career immediately. The CAS awarded Garza $2,970 to help with his legal costs.

The Tennis Integrity Unit was set up by the Grand Slam Board, the International Tennis Federation, the ATP and the WTA to fight corruption in the sport.

== ATP Challenger and ITF Futures finals ==
=== Singles: 17 (8–9) ===
Legend ATP Challenger (0–0) ITF Futures (8–9)	Finals by surface Hard (6–5) Clay (2–4) Grass (0–0) Carpet (0–0)

Result	W–L	Date	Tournament	Tier	Surface	Opponent	Score
Win	1–0	Apr 2003	Mexico F3, Naucalpan	Futures	Hard	(Brazil) Gabriel Pitta	2–6, 6–3, 7–6^{(9–7)}
Loss	1–1	Aug 2005	Mexico F9, Comitán	Futures	Hard	(Mexico) Luis-Manuel Flores	1–6, 4–6
Loss	1–2	Jan 2006	El Salvador F1, San Salvador	Futures	Clay	(France) Xavier Pujo	5–7, 0–2 ret.
Win	2–2	Jul 2006	Venezuela F1C, Caracas	Futures	Hard	(Venezuela) Román Recarte	6–1, 6–4
Loss	2–3	Aug 2006	Mexico F13, Monterrey	Futures	Clay	(Chile) Jorge Aguilar	6–7^{(4–7)}, 1–6
Win	3–3	May 2008	USA F1C, Tampa	Futures	Clay	(United States) Marcus Fugate	7–6^{(7–3)}, 6–2
Loss	3–4	May 2009	USA F10, Orange Park	Futures	Clay	(Italy) Luigi D'Agord	1–6, 7–6^{(7–4)}, 4–6
Loss	3–5	Oct 2009	Mexico F11, Monterrey	Futures	Hard	(United States) Todd Paul	1–6, 1–6
Loss	3–6	Nov 2009	Mexico F12, Obregón	Futures	Hard	(Canada) Vasek Pospisil	6–7^{(0–7)}, 3–6
Win	4–6	May 2011	USA F10, Vero Beach	Futures	Clay	(United States) Mitchell Frank	7–6^{(7–3)}, 1–6, 6–1
Loss	4–7	May 2011	USA F11, Orange Park	Futures	Clay	(Austria) Gerald Melzer	1–1 ret.
Win	5–7	May 2011	Mexico F2, Córdoba	Futures	Hard	(Australia) Brendon Moore	6–3, 1–6, 6–2
Win	6–7	Dec 2011	Mexico F14, Ixtapa	Futures	Hard	(Germany) Jaan-Frederik Brunken	6–3, 6–4
Loss	6–8	Jan 2012	Mexico F1, Monterrey	Futures	Hard	(Romania) Roman Borvanov	2–6, 3–6
Loss	6–9	Jun 2014	Mexico F6, Quintana Roo	Futures	Hard	(Mexico) Tigre Hank	6–7^{(3–7)}, 0–2 ret.
Win	7–9	Jul 2014	Mexico F8, Quintana Roo	Futures	Hard	(United States) Spencer Papa	6–1, 7–6^{(7–3)}
Win	8–9	Aug 2014	Mexico F9, Rosarito	Futures	Hard	(Mexico) Miguel Gallardo Valles	6–3, 6–4

=== Doubles: 58 (27–31) ===
Legend ATP Challenger (5–3) ITF Futures (22–28)	Finals by surface Hard (15–20) Clay (12–11) Grass (0–0) Carpet (0–0)

Result	W–L	Date	Tournament	Tier	Surface	Partner	Opponents	Score
Loss	0–1	Sep 2003	Mexico F13, Celaya	Futures	Hard	(Mexico) Julio-Cesar Garza-Oranday	(United States) Trace Fielding (United States) Keith From	6–7^{(1–7)}, 7–6^{(7–5)}, 1–6
Loss	0–2	Oct 2004	Mexico F12, Torreón	Futures	Hard	(Mexico) Carlos Palencia	(Mexico) Víctor Romero (Israel) Michael Kogen	1–6, 2–6
Loss	0–3	Feb 2005	Mexico F2, Casablanca	Futures	Hard	(Mexico) Marco Osorio	(Mexico) Daniel Langre (Mexico) Víctor Romero	4–6, 6–4, 3–6
Win	1–3	May 2005	Colombia F4, Pereira	Futures	Clay	(Argentina) Diego Hartfield	(Colombia) Pablo González (Brazil) Bruno Soares	7–6^{(7–4)}, 7–6^{(7–1)}
Loss	1–4	Aug 2005	Mexico F9, Comitán	Futures	Hard	(Mexico) Marcello Amador	(United States) Joseph Schmulian (Australia) Benjamin Stapp	5–7, 3–6
Win	2–4	Sep 2005	Mexico F12, Puerto Vallarta	Futures	Hard	(Mexico) Víctor Romero	(Australia) Scott Doerner (United States) Jason Zimmermann	6–4, 7–6^{(7–5)}
Win	3–4	Nov 2005	Mexico F17, Leon	Futures	Hard	(Colombia) Michael Quintero	(Sweden) Mikael Ekman (Sweden) Carl-Henrik Hansen	3–6, 6–1, 7–6^{(12–10)}
Win	4–4	Apr 2006	San Luis Potosí, Mexico	Challenger	Clay	(Poland) Dawid Olejniczak	(Mexico) Héctor Almada (Mexico) Víctor Romero	6–2, 6–2
Win	5–4	May 2006	Colombia F3, Cali	Futures	Clay	(Chile) Jorge Aguilar	(Brazil) Lucas Engel (Colombia) Michael Quintero	6–3, 6–2
Win	6–4	May 2006	Colombia F4, Barranquilla	Futures	Clay	(Chile) Jorge Aguilar	(Ecuador) Carlos Avellán (Colombia) Michael Quintero	4–6, 6–3, 6–2
Win	7–4	May 2006	Argentina F8, Mendoza	Futures	Clay	(Chile) Jorge Aguilar	(Argentina) Brian Dabul (Uruguay) Marcel Felder	5–7, 6–4, 6–3
Loss	7–5	Jun 2006	USA F12, Rocklin	Futures	Hard	(Chile) Jorge Aguilar	(South Africa) Kevin Anderson (United States) Scott Oudsema	3–6, 5–7
Loss	7–6	Jun 2006	USA F13, Woodland	Futures	Hard	(Chile) Jorge Aguilar	(South Africa) Kevin Anderson (United States) David Martin	6–7^{(5–7)}, 2–6
Win	8–6	Jul 2006	Argentina F14, Chico	Futures	Hard	(Mexico) Bruno Echagaray	(United States) John Isner (United States) Robbye Poole	6–4, 6–4
Win	9–6	Jul 2006	Bogotá, Colombia	Challenger	Clay	(Colombia) Michael Quintero	(Brazil) Rogério Dutra da Silva (Uruguay) Martín Vilarrubí	7–6^{(8–6)}, 6–4
Loss	9–7	Sep 2006	Mexico F14, Monterrey	Futures	Hard	(Chile) Jorge Aguilar	(United States) Shane La Porte (United States) lester Cook	3–6, 4–6
Loss	9–8	Nov 2006	Mexico F20, Querétaro	Futures	Hard	(Colombia) Pablo González	(Mexico) Víctor Romero (Mexico) Bruno Rodríguez	1–6, 7–5, 6–7^{(3–7)}
Win	10–8	Nov 2006	Puebla, Mexico	Challenger	Hard	(Netherlands Antilles) Jean-Julien Rojer	(Mexico) Bruno Echagaray (Romania) Horia Tecău	6–7^{(6–8)}, 6–3, [10–7]
Loss	10–9	May 2007	Colombia F3, Cali	Futures	Clay	(Ecuador) Carlos Avellán	(Colombia) Pablo González (Uruguay) Marcel Felder	4–6, 0–6
Loss	10–10	May 2007	Colombia F4, Pereira	Futures	Clay	(Colombia) Michael Quintero	(Colombia) Pablo González (Uruguay) Marcel Felder	3–6, 4–6
Win	11–10	Aug 2007	Venezuela F1, Valencia	Futures	Hard	(Mexico) Santiago González	(Colombia) Alejandro González (Chile) Borja Malo-Casado	6–3, 7–6^{(7–2)}
Loss	11–11	Jul 2008	USA F19, Godfrey	Futures	Hard	(Brazil) Nicolas Santos	(United States) Austin Krajicek (United States) Conor Pollock	1–6, 7–6^{(8–6)}, [6–10]
Loss	11–12	Oct 2008	Mexico F12, Mazatlán	Futures	Hard	(Mexico) Luis Díaz Barriga	(Canada) Adil Shamasdin (France) Fabrice Martin	walkover
Loss	11–13	Nov 2008	Puebla, Mexico	Challenger	Hard	(Mexico) Santiago González	(United States) Eric Nunez (United States) Nicholas Monroe	6–4, 3–6, [6–10]
Loss	11–14	Aug 2009	Colombia F3, Barranquilla	Futures	Clay	(Colombia) Michael Quintero	(Argentina) Andrés Molteni (Argentina) Gonza loTur	4–6, 6–7^{(6–8)}
Loss	11–15	Aug 2009	Colombia F5, Medellín	Futures	Clay	(Colombia) Michael Quintero	(Colombia) Alejandro González (Colombia) Juan Sebastián Cabal	1–6, 4–6
Loss	11–16	Oct 2009	Mexico F11, Monterrey	Futures	Hard	(Mexico) Bruno Echagaray	(United States) Ashwin Kumas (United States) Brett Joelson	4–6, 2–6
Loss	11–17	Feb 2010	USA F4, Palm Coast	Futures	Clay	(United States) Eric Nunez	(United States) Benjamin Rogers (United States) Taylor Fogleman	walkover
Win	12–17	Feb 2010	Mexico F1, Mexico City	Futures	Hard	(Mexico) Bruno Rodríguez	(Mexico) Luis Díaz Barriga (Mexico) M Á Reyes-Varela	6–4, 7–5
Win	13–17	Jun 2010	Venezuela F3, Barquisimeto	Futures	Hard	(Mexico) Antonio Ruiz-Rosales	(Mexico) Tigre Hank (Greece) V. M-Stoliarenko	6–0, 6–1
Loss	13–18	Aug 2010	Colombia F1, Bogotá	Futures	Clay	(United States) Denis Zivkovic	(Peru) Mauricio Echazú (United States) Maciek Sykut	6–3, 3–6, [8–10]
Win	14–18	Sep 2010	USA F24, Costa Mesa	Futures	Hard	(France) Fabrice Martin	(Philippines) Ruben Gonzales (United States) Robbye Poole	6–4, 6–2
Win	15–18	Oct 2010	Quito, Ecuador	Challenger	Clay	(United States) Eric Nunez	(Colombia) Alejandro González (Colombia) Carlos Salamanca	7–5, 6–4
Win	16–18	Nov 2010	Mexico F10, Colima	Futures	Hard	(United States) Chris Kwon	(United States) James Ludlow (United States) Christian Welte	6–2, 6–1
Loss	16–19	Jun 2011	Mexico F6, Puebla	Futures	Hard	(Mexico) Gustavo Loza	(Mexico) Manuel Sánchez (Colombia) Nicolás Barrientos	3–6, 3–6
Loss	16–20	Jul 2011	Manta, Ecuador	Challenger	Hard	(Uruguay) Marcel Felder	(Argentina) Brian Dabul (South Africa) Izak van der Merwe	1–6, 7–6^{(7–2)}, [9–11]
Win	17–20	Aug 2011	Mexico F9, Tijuana	Futures	Hard	(Uruguay) Marcel Felder	(El Salvador) Marcelo Arévalo (Australia) Robert McKenzie	7–5, 7–6^{(7–4)}
Win	18–20	Oct 2011	Aguascalientes, Mexico	Challenger	Clay	(Mexico) Santiago González	(Ecuador) Julio César Campozano (Dominican Republic) Víctor Estrella Burgos	6–4, 5–7, [11–9]
Loss	18–21	Dec 2011	Mexico F15, Tehuacan	Futures	Hard	(Mexico) Raul-Isaias Rosas-Zarur	(Mexico) César Ramírez (Australia) Nima Roshan	3–6, 1–6
Loss	18–22	Mar 2012	Santiago, Chile	Challenger	Clay	(Chile) Jorge Aguilar	(Uruguay) Marcel Felder (Chile) Paul Capdeville	7–6^{(7–3)}, 4–6, [7–10]
Win	19–22	Apr 2012	Mexico F4, Mexico City	Futures	Hard	(Mexico) Luis Díaz Barriga	(New Zealand) Marvin Barker (Australia) Chris Letcher	6–4, 6–4
Loss	19–23	Jun 2012	Slovenia F3, Litija	Futures	Clay	(Australia) Thanasi Kokkinakis	(Germany) Marc Sieber (Germany) Steven Moneke	2–6, 6–2, [8–10]
Loss	19–24	Mar 2013	Canada F2, Sherbrooke	Futures	Hard	(United States) Vahid Mirzadeh	(United States) Austin Krajicek (United States) Chase Buchanan	3–6, 2–6
Loss	19–25	May 2013	USA F11, Vero Beach	Futures	Clay	(Australia) Carsten Ball	(Finland) Juho Paukku (Serbia) Vladimir Obradović	walkover
Win	20–25	Jul 2013	USA F19, Joplin	Futures	Hard	(Venezuela) Roberto Maytín	(Israel) Dekel Bar (Australia) Leon Frost	6–1, 6–2
Win	21–25	Sep 2013	USA F23, Claremont	Futures	Hard	(Australia) Carsten Ball	(South Africa) Matt Fawcett (United States) Oscar F Matthews	6–3, 6–2
Loss	21–26	Nov 2013	Mexico F19, Merida	Futures	Hard	(Mexico) Angel Peredo	(Puerto Rico) Alex Lampart (El Salvador) Marcelo Arévalo	4–6, 5–7
Win	22–26	Feb 2014	USA F5, Sunrise	Futures	Clay	(Mexico) Hans Hach Verdugo	(Austria) Marc Rath (Austria) Nicolas Reissig	7–6^{(7–4)}, 6–4
Loss	22–27	Feb 2014	USA F6, Boynton Beach	Futures	Clay	(Barbados) Darian King	(United States) Deiton Baughman (United States) Collin Altamirano	4–6, 4–6
Win	23–27	May 2014	USA F12, Vero Beach	Futures	Clay	(Chile) Jorge Aguilar	(United States) Devin McCarthy (United States) Connor Smith	6–4, 6–7^{(3–7)}, [10–7]
Loss	23–28	Jul 2014	USA F20, Tulsa	Futures	Hard	(Mexico) Raul-Isaias Rosas-Zarur	(United Kingdom) Luke Bambridge (United Kingdom) Liam Broady	4–6, 2–5 ret.
Win	24–28	Aug 2014	Mexico F9, Rosarito	Futures	Hard	(Mexico) Antonio Ruiz Rosales	(Australia) Jarryd Chaplin (New Zealand) Ben McLachlan	0–6, ret.
Loss	24–29	Jun 2015	USA F17, Buffalo	Futures	Clay	(Argentina) Maximiliano Estévez	(United States) Nathan Pasha (United States) Sekou Bangoura	walkover
Win	25–29	Nov 2015	Colombia F9, Valledupar	Futures	Hard	(Japan) Kaichi Uchida	(Mexico) Manuel Sánchez (Bolivia) Federico Zeballos	7–6^{(7–3)}, 5–7, [10–8]
Loss	25–30	Dec 2015	USA F35, Tallahassee	Futures	Hard	(Mexico) Tigre Hank	(United States) Nicolas Meister (United States) Eric Quigley	3–6, 5–7
Loss	25–31	Apr 2016	USA F12, Memphis	Futures	Hard	(Mexico) Tigre Hank	(United Kingdom) Darren Walsh (United Kingdom) Luke Bambridge	1–6, 2–6
Win	26–31	Sep 2017	Turkey F32, Antalya	Futures	Clay	(Argentina) Patricio Heras	(Brazil) Caio Silva (Brazil) Thales Turini	6–4, 7–5
Win	27–31	Sep 2017	Turkey F33, Antalya	Futures	Clay	(Brazil) Felipe Meligeni Alves	(Russia) Victor Baluda (Russia) Ilya Vasilyev	5–7, 7–6^{(7–5)}, [10–5]
