= Jonathan Chu (tennis) =

American tennis player

- Country (sports): United States (2005–06); Hong Kong (2011–12)
- Born: 21 March 1983 (age 43) New York City, U.S.
- Plays: Right-handed
- Prize money: $15,403

Singles
- Career record: 3–1 (Davis Cup)
- Highest ranking: No. 527 (28 Aug 2006)

Doubles
- Career record: 1–3 (Davis Cup)
- Highest ranking: No. 461 (12 Jun 2006)

Jonathan Chu (born 21 March 1983) is an American former professional tennis player.

Chu was born and raised in New York. His grandfather, Joseph Chu, was a Hong Kong-Chinese immigrant to the United States and became one of the biggest landlords in New York's Chinatown.

Before turning professional in 2005, Chu played collegiate tennis for Harvard University while studying for an economics degree. He served as team captain and in his senior year reached the semi-finals of the NCAA Championships.

From 2005 to 2006, he competed internationally on the ITF circuit and in the occasional ATP Challenger tournament, reaching a career best singles ranking of 527 in the world.

In 2011, he returned to tennis to play Davis Cup for Hong Kong, where he worked as an investment banker. He won three singles and one doubles rubber in his Davis Cup career.

Chu is the manager director of his family's New York property business Chu Enterprises.

== ITF Futures titles ==
=== Singles: (1) ===
No.	Date	Tournament	Surface	Opponent	Score
1.	Mar 2006	China F5 Futures, Guangzhou	Hard	(Netherlands) Antal van der Duim	7–6^{(4)}, 6–7^{(0)}, 4–0 ret.

=== Doubles: (4) ===
No.	Date	Tournament	Surface	Partner	Opponents	Score
1.	Sep 2005	Japan F10, Tokyo	Hard	(United States) David Martin	(Japan) Naoki Arimoto (Japan) Yasuo Miyazaki	6–2, 6–4
2.	Oct 2005	Mexico F15, Ciudad Obregón	Hard	(United States) Alberto Francis	(Mexico) Bruno Echagaray (Mexico) Carlos Palencia	2–6, 7–6^{(5)}, 6–2
3.	May 2006	USA F9, Vero Beach	Clay	(South Africa) Izak van der Merwe	(United States) Brendan Evans (United States) Troy Hahn	6–4, 7–6^{(0)}
4.	Jun 2006	USA F15, Buffalo	Clay	(United States) Alex Clayton	(Australia) Shannon Nettle (Australia) Daniel Wendler	6–3, 3–6, 6–1
