= Daniel Langre =

Mexican tennis player

- Country (sports): Mexico
- Born: 7 March 1981 (age 44) Mexico City, Mexico
- Height: 6 ft (183 cm)
- Plays: Right-handed
- Prize money: $16,888

Singles
- Career record: 1–0 (Davis Cup)
- Highest ranking: No. 615 (5 Dec 2005)

Doubles
- Career record: 1–0 (Davis Cup)
- Highest ranking: No. 352 (13 Jun 2005)

Daniel Langre (born 7 March 1981) is a Mexican former professional tennis player.

Born and raised in Mexico City, Langre was national junior champion in multiple age groups and as a doubles player was a world number six ITF Junior. He played collegiate tennis for the USC Trojans and was a member of the 2002 NCAA Division I championship team. On the professional tour, he won one singles and three doubles titles at the ITF Futures level. In 2004, he represented Mexico in a Davis Cup tie against Jamaica, winning both his singles and doubles rubbers. He made the doubles semi-finals of a 2005 Challenger in Mexico City with his 37-year-old coach Leonardo Lavalle.

== ITF Futures titles ==
=== Singles: (1) ===
No.	Date	Tournament	Surface	Opponent	Score
1.	Aug 2005	Mexico F10, Monterrey	Hard	(United States) Hamid Mirzadeh	6–4, 6–2

=== Doubles: (3) ===
No.	Date	Tournament	Surface	Partner	Opponents	Score
1.	Oct 1999	Mexico F6, Chihuahua	Hard	(Venezuela) José de Armas	(Mexico) Luis Uribe (Lebanon) Jicham Zaatini	7–5, 6–7, 7–6
2.	Nov 2004	Mexico F16, León	Hard	(Mexico) Víctor Romero	(Poland) Dawid Olejniczak (Poland) Piotr Szczepanik	7–6^{(4)}, 7–5
3.	Feb 2005	Mexico F2, Mexico	Hard	(Mexico) Víctor Romero	(Mexico) Daniel Garza (Mexico) Marco Osorio	6–4, 4–6, 6–3

== See also ==
- List of Mexico Davis Cup team representatives
