= Michael Kogan =

Ukrainian entrepreneur

- Михайло Коган
- Born: Michael Kogan; January 1, 1920; Odesa, Ukrainian People's Republic
- Died: February 5, 1984 (aged 64); Los Angeles, California, United States
- Occupation: Entrepreneur
- Years active: 1944–1984
- Known for: Founder of Taito
- Spouse: Asya Kachanovsky
- Children: 2

Michael "Misha" Kogan (January 1, 1920 – February 5, 1984) was a Ukrainian entrepreneur who founded the Japanese video game company Taito.

== Early life ==
Kogan was born in Odesa on January 1, 1920 to Riva and Kalman Kogan. His family moved to Harbin, Manchuria to escape the Russian Revolution, where he later met Colonel Norihiro Yasue, a member of the Japanese Army's intelligence services and one of the architects of the Fugu Plan, a plan to settle European Jewish refugees in Japanese-occupied Manchuria. He moved to Tokyo in 1939, where he spent most of the duration of the war studying at Waseda School of Economics. He moved to Tianjin in 1944 before returning to Japan in 1950, settling in Setagaya, Tokyo.

== Career ==
Michael Kogan founded his first business in 1944 in Shanghai, called Taitung, its business dealings included natural hair wigs, floor coverings, and hog bristles. Kogan closed Taitung in 1950 after the Communist takeover of China and started his second business in Japan shortly after, a clothing distribution company named Taito Yoko. The constant loss of products and negligent employees caused Taito Yoko to struggle financially, and it was eventually abolished.

Kogan established the Taito Trading Company on August 24, 1953, and it eventually became Taito Corporation. The company started out importing and distributing vending machines and then jukeboxes before evolving to manufacture their own.

Kogan died during a business trip in Los Angeles in February 1984. After his death, his son, Abraham "Abba" Kogan, became Taito's chairman and Akio Nakanishi became its president.

== Family and legacy ==
Kogan married Asya Kachanovsky (b. July 6, 1924 – December 21, 2013) and had two children with her, a son named Abraham ("Abba") (b. January 1947) and a daughter named Rita (b. June 1949). The two stayed married until Michael's death. Asya lived in Tokyo, Abba lives in Monaco, and Rita lived in Southern California and was married to Richard Edlund, founder of Boss Film Studios and an Academy Award-winning Visual Effects Supervisor until her death in 2019.

Abba had a 7.16% holding of Taito stock as late as September 30, 1999, while Rita had an 8.50% holding and Asya had a 2.13% holding as late as March 31, 2005. After Asya died on December 21, 2013, it was discovered that about 10 billion yen in inheritance taxes for overseas property was not paid.
