= Joel Kielbowicz =

American tennis player (born 1983)

- Country (sports): United States
- Born: April 20, 1983 (age 43)
- Prize money: $11,787

Singles
- Highest ranking: No. 874 (November 1, 2010)

Doubles
- Highest ranking: No. 479 (September 10, 2007)

Grand Slam mixed doubles results
- US Open: 1R (2014)

Joel Kielbowicz (born April 20, 1983) is an American tennis player. He competed in the 2014 US Open Mixed doubles tournament, for which he received a wild card together with his compatriot, and now wife, Jacqueline Cako.

== See also ==
- Tennis in the United States
