= Marcello Amador =

Mexican tennis player

Marcello Amador Delgado
- Country (sports): Mexico
- Born: 27 September 1980 (age 44); Lagos de Moreno, Mexico
- Height: 1.75 m (5 ft 9 in)
- Plays: Right-handed
- Prize money: $37,214

Singles
- Career record: 0–3 (Davis Cup)
- Highest ranking: No. 323 (13 Jan 2003)

Doubles
- Highest ranking: No. 415 (19 Nov 2001)
Medal record
Central American and Caribbean Games
Gold medal – first place	2002 San Salvador	Team
Bronze medal – third place	2002 San Salvador	Singles

Marcello Amador (born 27 September 1980) is a Mexican former professional tennis player.

Amador, who was born in Lagos de Moreno, reached a career high singles ranking of 323 while competing on the professional tour. He won two singles and two doubles titles on the ITF Futures Circuit.

In 2001 and 2002 he represented the Mexico Davis Cup team, appearing in a total of three singles rubbers. He finished 0–3 from these matches, but did manage to take a set off former world number one Marcelo Ríos in Querétaro.

At the 2002 Central American and Caribbean Games in San Salvador, Amador won a gold medal in the team event as well as a singles bronze medal for Mexico.

== See also ==
- List of Mexico Davis Cup team representatives
