= Juan Manuel Elizondo =

Mexican tennis player (born 1983)

- Country (sports): Mexico
- Residence: Atlanta, United States
- Born: June 8, 1983 (age 42) León, Guanajuato, Mexico
- Height: 1.80 m (5 ft 11 in)
- Plays: Ambidextrous
- Prize money: $63,980

Singles
- Career record: 2–0
- Career titles: 0
- Highest ranking: No. 446 (5 December 2005)

Grand Slam singles results
- US Open: No. 297 (22 March 2010)

Doubles
- Career record: 1-2
- Career titles: 0

Juan Manuel Elizondo (Latin American Spanish: [ˈxwam maˈnwel eliˈsondo]; born June 8, 1983) is a Mexican professional tennis player.
