= 2016 Aegon Manchester Trophy – Singles =

Singles
- 2016 Aegon Manchester Trophy

Final
- Champion: (Germany) Dustin Brown
- Runner-up: (Chinese Taipei) Lu Yen-hsun
- Score: 7–6^{(7–5)}, 6–1

Events
Singles	Doubles
← 2015 ·	Aegon Manchester Trophy	· 2017 →

Sam Groth was the defending champion at the 2016 edition of the Aegon Manchester Trophy, but lost in the quarterfinals to Denis Kudla.

Dustin Brown won the title after defeating Lu Yen-hsun 7–6^{(7–5)}, 6–1 in the final.

== Seeds ==
1. (United States) Denis Kudla (semifinals)
2. (United States) Rajeev Ram (first round)
3. (United Kingdom) Daniel Evans (first round)
4. (Chinese Taipei) Lu Yen-hsun (final)
5. (Germany) Benjamin Becker (first round)
6. (Ukraine) Sergiy Stakhovsky (quarterfinals)
7. (Australia) Sam Groth (quarterfinals)
8. (United States) Bjorn Fratangelo (withdrew)

== Draw ==
=== Key ===
- Q = Qualifier
- WC = Wild card
- LL = Lucky loser
- Alt = Alternate
- ITF = ITF entry
- PR = Protected ranking
- SR = Special ranking
- SE = Special exempt
- JE = Junior exempt
- JR = Junior Accelerator Programme entrant
- CO = College Accelerator Programme entrant
- NG = Next Gen Accelerator Program entrant
- w/o = Walkover
- r = Retired
- d = Defaulted

=== Finals ===
Semifinals
1	(United States) Denis Kudla	4	6	4
4	(Chinese Taipei) Lu Yen-hsun	6	4	6
(Germany) Peter Gojowczyk	3	2
(Germany) Dustin Brown	6	6

Final
4	(Chinese Taipei) Lu Yen-hsun	6^{5}	1
(Germany) Dustin Brown	7^{7}	6

=== Top half ===
First round
1	(United States) D Kudla	6	6
(Colombia) E Struvay	3	3
Q	(Switzerland) A Bossel	4	4
(United States) S Kozlov	6	6
(United States) D Novikov	6	3	6
Alt	(Spain) A Menéndez Maceiras	3	6	4
WC	(United Kingdom) L Broady	3	6	4
7	(Australia) S Groth	6	3	6
4	(Chinese Taipei) Y-h Lu	4	6	6
WC	(United Kingdom) L Glasspool	6	3	4
(Slovenia) G Žemlja	7^{7}	4	1
Alt	(Australia) J Duckworth	6^{4}	6	6
Q	(United Kingdom) E Corrie	7^{7}	5	7
WC	(United Kingdom) B Klein	6^{2}	7	5
Q	(Australia) M Matosevic	5	6^{6}
6	(Ukraine) S Stakhovsky	7	7^{8}

Second round
1	(United States) D Kudla	6	6
(United States) S Kozlov	4	3
(United States) D Novikov	6	3	5
7	(Australia) S Groth	3	6	7
4	(Chinese Taipei) Y-h Lu	6	3	6
Alt	(Australia) J Duckworth	1	6	4
Q	(United Kingdom) E Corrie	1	5
6	(Ukraine) S Stakhovsky	6	7

Quarterfinals
1	(United States) D Kudla	6	7^{15}
7	(Australia) S Groth	2	6^{13}
4	(Chinese Taipei) Y-h Lu	7^{10}	7^{7}
6	(Ukraine) S Stakhovsky	6^{8}	6^{3}

Semifinals
1	(United States) D Kudla	4	6	4
4	(Chinese Taipei) Y-h Lu	6	4	6

=== Bottom half ===
First round
LL	(China) Z Li	2	2
(Germany) M Berrer	6	6
WC	(United Kingdom) A Ward	6^{5}	6	6
(Colombia) A Falla	7^{7}	2	4
Q	(Australia) M Reid	7^{7}	6
(Russia) K Kravchuk	6^{4}	2
(Germany) P Gojowczyk	7^{7}	6
3	(United Kingdom) D Evans	6^{2}	3
5	(Germany) B Becker	4	6	7
(Australia) J-P Smith	6	3	5
(United Kingdom) J Ward	7	6
(Australia) L Saville	5	3
Alt	(Germany) M Zverev	6^{4}	7	6
(Netherlands) I Sijsling	7^{7}	5	4
(Germany) D Brown	7^{7}	7^{7}
2	(United States) R Ram	6^{3}	6^{3}

Second round
(Germany) M Berrer	6	4	3
WC	(United Kingdom) A Ward	4	6	6
Q	(Australia) M Reid	6^{4}	7^{7}	4
(Germany) P Gojowczyk	7^{7}	6^{4}	6
5	(Germany) B Becker	3	4
(United Kingdom) J Ward	6	6
Alt	(Germany) M Zverev	3	6	5
(Germany) D Brown	6	2	7

Quarterfinals
WC	(United Kingdom) A Ward	3	6^{11}
(Germany) P Gojowczyk	6	7^{13}
(United Kingdom) J Ward	6^{7}	2
(Germany) D Brown	7^{9}	6

Semifinals
(Germany) P Gojowczyk	3	2
(Germany) D Brown	6	6
