= 2009 Købstædernes ATP Challenger =

- Date: 12–18 October
- Edition: 5th
- Surface: Hard
- Location: Kolding, Denmark

Champions

Singles
- (United Kingdom) Alex Bogdanovic

Doubles
- (Austria) Martin Fischer / (Austria) Philipp Oswald
← 2008 ·	Købstædernes ATP Challenger	· 2010 →

The 2009 Købstædernes ATP Challenger was a professional tennis tournament played on indoor hard courts. It was the fifth edition of the tournament which was part of the 2009 ATP Challenger Tour. It took place in Kolding, Denmark between 12 and 18 October 2009.

== ATP entrants ==
=== Seeds ===
Country	Player	Rank^{1}	Seed
FIN	Jarkko Nieminen	72	1
BEL	Olivier Rochus	84	2
BEL	Steve Darcis	94	3
NED	Thiemo de Bakker	116	4
AUT	Stefan Koubek	122	5
CRO	Ivan Dodig	171	6
AUT	Andreas Haider-Maurer	173	7
BEL	Ruben Bemelmans	178	8

- Rankings are as of October 5, 2009.

=== Other entrants ===
The following players received wildcards into the singles main draw:

- (Denmark) Thomas Kromann
- (Denmark) Frederik Nielsen
- (Denmark) Martin Pedersen
- (Denmark) Søren Wedege

The following players received entry from the qualifying draw:

- (Germany) Michael Kohlmann
- (Germany) Lars Pörschke
- (Sweden) Filip Prpic
- (Russia) Dmitri Sitak

== Champions ==
=== Singles ===
(United Kingdom) Alex Bogdanovic def. (Croatia) Ivan Dodig, 3–6, 7–6(7), defaulted

=== Doubles ===
(Austria) Martin Fischer / (Austria) Philipp Oswald def. (United Kingdom) Jonathan Marray / (Pakistan) Aisam-ul-Haq Qureshi, 7–5, 6–3
