= 2009 Købstædernes ATP Challenger – Doubles =

Doubles
- 2009 Købstædernes ATP Challenger

Final
- Champions: (Austria) Martin Fischer (Austria) Philipp Oswald
- Runners-up: (United Kingdom) Jonathan Marray (Pakistan) Aisam-ul-Haq Qureshi
- Score: 7–5, 6–3

Events
Singles	Doubles
← 2008 ·	Købstædernes ATP Challenger	· 2010 →

Brendan Evans and Chris Haggard were the defending champions, but they chose to not defend their title.
Austrian pair Martin Fischer and Philipp Oswald won in the final 7–5, 6–3, against Jonathan Marray and Aisam-ul-Haq Qureshi.

== Seeds ==
1. (Germany) Michael Kohlmann / (Austria) Alexander Peya (semifinals)
2. (United Kingdom) Jonathan Marray / (Pakistan) Aisam-ul-Haq Qureshi (final)
3. (United Kingdom) Jamie Delgado / (United Kingdom) Jamie Murray (first round)
4. (Austria) Martin Fischer / (Austria) Philipp Oswald (champions)

== Draw ==
=== Key ===
- Q = Qualifier
- WC = Wild card
- LL = Lucky loser
- Alt = Alternate
- SE = Special exempt
- PR = Protected ranking
- ITF = ITF entry
- JE = Junior exempt
- w/o = Walkover
- r = Retired
- d = Defaulted
- SR = Special ranking

=== Draw ===
First round
1	(Germany) M Kohlmann (Austria) A Peya	6	7
WC	(Denmark) T Kromann (Denmark) M Pedersen	2	6^{4}
(United States) B Battistone (United States) D Battistone	6	3	[11]
(Jamaica) D Brown (Canada) A Shamasdin	1	6	[9]
4	(Austria) M Fischer (Austria) P Oswald	6	3	[10]
(Belgium) N Desein (United Kingdom) C Eaton	3	6	[5]
WC	(Denmark) E Hess-Olesen (Denmark) S Hess-Olesen	1	2
(Italy) M Crugnola (Australia) J Sirianni	6	6
(Finland) H Kontinen (Finland) T Nieminen	6	6
(Croatia) I Dodig (Croatia) A Veić	2	2
(Germany) M Emmrich (Sweden) A Siljeström	4	6	[10]
(United Kingdom) J Delgado (United Kingdom) J Murray	6	3	[8]
WC	(Denmark) S Wedege (Denmark) R Winkler	6^{1}	5
(Belgium) R Bemelmans (Denmark) F Nielsen	7	7
(Latvia) A Juška (Russia) D Sitak	6^{0}	2
2	(United Kingdom) J Marray (Pakistan) A-u-H Qureshi	7	6

Quarterfinals
1	(Germany) M Kohlmann (Austria) A Peya	6	7
(United States) B Battistone (United States) D Battistone	3	5
4	(Austria) M Fischer (Austria) P Oswald	6	6
(Italy) M Crugnola (Australia) J Sirianni	3	2
(Finland) H Kontinen (Finland) T Nieminen	6^{1}	7	[10]
(Germany) M Emmrich (Sweden) A Siljeström	7	6^{3}	[4]
(Belgium) R Bemelmans (Denmark) F Nielsen	3	5
2	(United Kingdom) J Marray (Pakistan) A-u-H Qureshi	6	7

Semifinals
1	(Germany) M Kohlmann (Austria) A Peya	5	1
4	(Austria) M Fischer (Austria) P Oswald	7	6
(Finland) H Kontinen (Finland) T Nieminen	3	4
2	(United Kingdom) J Marray (Pakistan) A-u-H Qureshi	6	6

Finals
4	(Austria) M Fischer (Austria) P Oswald	7	6
2	(United Kingdom) J Marray (Pakistan) A-u-H Qureshi	5	3
