= 2009 Købstædernes ATP Challenger – Singles =

Singles
- 2009 Købstædernes ATP Challenger

Final
- Champion: (United Kingdom) Alex Bogdanovic
- Runner-up: (Croatia) Ivan Dodig
- Score: 3–6, 7–6(7), def.

Events
Singles	Doubles
← 2008 ·	Købstædernes ATP Challenger	· 2010 →

Alex Bogdanovic won this tournament, after Ivan Dodig disqualification in the final (when the result was 3–6, 7–6(7)). Roko Karanušić chose not to defend his 2009 title.

== Seeds ==
1. (Finland) Jarkko Nieminen (second round)
2. (Belgium) Olivier Rochus (second round)
3. (Belgium) Steve Darcis (first round)
4. (Netherlands) Thiemo de Bakker (quarterfinals)
5. (Austria) Stefan Koubek (quarterfinals)
6. (Croatia) Ivan Dodig (final, disqualification)
7. (Austria) Andreas Haider-Maurer (first round)
8. (Belgium) Ruben Bemelmans (second round)

== Draw ==
=== Key ===
- Q = Qualifier
- WC = Wild card
- LL = Lucky loser
- Alt = Alternate
- ITF = ITF entry
- PR = Protected ranking
- SR = Special ranking
- SE = Special exempt
- JE = Junior exempt
- JR = Junior Accelerator Programme entrant
- CO = College Accelerator Programme entrant
- NG = Next Gen Accelerator Program entrant
- w/o = Walkover
- r = Retired
- d = Defaulted

=== Finals ===
Semifinals
(Austria) Alexander Peya	6	5	3
6	(Croatia) Ivan Dodig	4	7	6
(Czech Republic) Robin Vik	5	3
(United Kingdom) Alex Bogdanovic	7	6

Final
6	(Croatia) Ivan Dodig	6	6^{7}	d.
(United Kingdom) Alex Bogdanovic	3	7

=== Top half ===
First round
1	(Finland) J Nieminen	6	6^{4}	6
(Bulgaria) G Dimitrov	2	7	2
(Austria) A Peya	7	6
Q	(Sweden) F Prpic	5	4
(Belgium) N Desein	4	7	6
(Austria) P Oswald	6	6^{5}	3
(Austria) M Fischer	6	6
7	(Austria) A Haider-Maurer	0	3
4	(Netherlands) T de Bakker	1	7	7
Q	(Germany) L Pörschke	6	5	6^{3}
(Belgium) Y Mertens	6^{4}	6	6^{1}
WC	(Denmark) F Nielsen	7	4	7
(Australia) J Sirianni	4	7	5
(Croatia) A Veić	6	5	7
WC	(Denmark) M Pedersen	6^{3}	6	6^{5}
6	(Croatia) I Dodig	7	1	7

Second round
1	(Finland) J Nieminen	7	2	2
(Austria) A Peya	5	6	6
(Belgium) N Desein	6^{3}	4
(Austria) M Fischer	7	6
4	(Netherlands) T de Bakker	6	6
WC	(Denmark) F Nielsen	3	4
(Croatia) A Veić	3	2
6	(Croatia) I Dodig	6	6

Quarterfinals
(Austria) A Peya	6	7
(Austria) M Fischer	4	6^{3}
4	(Netherlands) T de Bakker	7	6^{5}	2
6	(Croatia) I Dodig	5	7	6

Semifinals
(Austria) A Peya	6	5	3
6	(Croatia) I Dodig	4	7	6

=== Bottom half ===
First round
8	(Belgium) R Bemelmans	7	6
(Jamaica) D Brown	5	3
(Germany) M Bachinger	6	6
WC	(Denmark) S Wedege	3	1
(Czech Republic) R Vik	6	6
(Netherlands) R Sluiter	3	2
Q	(Germany) M Kohlmann	6	3	7
3	(Belgium) S Darcis	1	6	6^{1}
5	(Austria) S Koubek	6	7
Q	(Russia) D Sitak	4	6^{3}
(Germany) T Kamke	0	r
(Italy) M Crugnola	3
(Latvia) A Juška	4	2
(United Kingdom) A Bogdanovic	6	6
WC	(Denmark) T Kromann	6	1	4
2	(Belgium) O Rochus	3	6	6

Second round
8	(Belgium) R Bemelmans	3	6	3
(Germany) M Bachinger	6	2	6
(Czech Republic) R Vik	3	6	6
Q	(Germany) M Kohlmann	6	3	3
5	(Austria) S Koubek	4	7	6
(Italy) M Crugnola	6	6^{1}	4
(United Kingdom) A Bogdanovic	7	3	7
2	(Belgium) O Rochus	5	6	5

Quarterfinals
(Germany) M Bachinger	6^{3}	2
(Czech Republic) R Vik	7	6
5	(Austria) S Koubek	1	1
(United Kingdom) A Bogdanovic	6	6

Semifinals
(Czech Republic) R Vik	5	3
(United Kingdom) A Bogdanovic	7	6
