= 2016 Aegon Manchester Trophy – Doubles =

Doubles
- 2016 Aegon Manchester Trophy

Final
- Champions: (India) Purav Raja (India) Divij Sharan
- Runners-up: (United Kingdom) Ken Skupski (United Kingdom) Neal Skupski
- Score: 6–3, 3–6, [11–9]

Events
Singles	Doubles
← 2015 ·	Aegon Manchester Trophy	· 2017 →

Chris Guccione and André Sá are the defending champions, but chose not to participate.

Purav Raja and Divij Sharan won the title after defeating Ken Skupski and Neal Skupski 6–3, 3–6, [11–9] in the final.

== Seeds ==
1. (New Zealand) Marcus Daniell / (Sweden) Andreas Siljeström (semifinals)
2. (United Kingdom) Ken Skupski / (United Kingdom) Neal Skupski (final)
3. (United Kingdom) Jonathan Marray / (Canada) Adil Shamasdin (first round)
4. (Australia) Sam Groth / (Australia) Matt Reid (first round)

== Draw ==
=== Key ===
- Q = Qualifier
- WC = Wild card
- LL = Lucky loser
- Alt = Alternate
- SE = Special exempt
- PR = Protected ranking
- ITF = ITF entry
- JE = Junior exempt
- w/o = Walkover
- r = Retired
- d = Defaulted
- SR = Special ranking

First round
1	(New Zealand) M Daniell (Sweden) A Siljeström	7^{12}	6^{8}	[10]
WC	(United Kingdom) L Bambridge (United Kingdom) D Evans	6^{10}	7^{10}	[8]
(Germany) D Brown (Chinese Taipei) Y-h Lu	3	7^{7}	[10]
(United States) D Kudla (United States) R Ram	6	6^{4}	[7]
3	(United Kingdom) J Marray (Canada) A Shamasdin	3	6^{5}
(India) P Raja (India) D Sharan	6	7^{7}
(Denmark) F Nielsen (Netherlands) I Sijsling	7	6
(Colombia) A Falla (Colombia) E Struvay	5	3
(Germany) B Becker (Spain) A Menéndez-Maceiras	7^{7}	6
(United States) B Fratangelo (Australia) L Saville	6^{4}	3
(Australia) J-P Smith (Australia) J Thompson	6	5	[12]
4	(Australia) S Groth (Australia) M Reid	4	7	[10]
WC	(United Kingdom) L Glasspool (United Kingdom) B Klein	6	6
WC	(United Kingdom) L Broady (United Kingdom) D Walsh	4	4
(United States) D Novikov (Ukraine) S Stakhovsky	6	6^{5}	[7]
2	(United Kingdom) K Skupski (United Kingdom) N Skupski	0	7^{7}	[10]

Quarterfinals
1	(New Zealand) M Daniell (Sweden) A Siljeström	6	6
(Germany) D Brown (Chinese Taipei) Y-h Lu	3	4
(India) P Raja (India) D Sharan	6	6
(Denmark) F Nielsen (Netherlands) I Sijsling	0	2
(Germany) B Becker (Spain) A Menéndez-Maceiras	2	6	[10]
(Australia) J-P Smith (Australia) J Thompson	6	4	[3]
WC	(United Kingdom) L Glasspool (United Kingdom) B Klein	4	2
2	(United Kingdom) K Skupski (United Kingdom) N Skupski	6	6

Semifinals
1	(New Zealand) M Daniell (Sweden) A Siljeström	5	6^{3}
(India) P Raja (India) D Sharan	7	7^{7}
(Germany) B Becker (Spain) A Menéndez-Maceiras	3	6^{4}
2	(United Kingdom) K Skupski (United Kingdom) N Skupski	6	7^{7}

Final
(India) P Raja (India) D Sharan	6	3	[11]
2	(United Kingdom) K Skupski (United Kingdom) N Skupski	3	6	[9]
