= 2009 Manchester Trophy – Singles =

Singles
- 2009 Manchester Trophy

Final
- Champion: (Belgium) Olivier Rochus
- Runner-up: (Netherlands) Igor Sijsling
- Score: 6–3, 4–6, 6–2

Events
Singles	Doubles
← 2008 ·	Manchester Trophy	· 2010 →

Björn Rehnquist was the champion in 2008; however, he chose to not participate this year.
Olivier Rochus became the new winner, after won against Igor Sijsling in the final.

== Seeds ==
1. (Ukraine) Sergiy Stakhovsky (first round)
2. (Belgium) Olivier Rochus (champion)
3. (Slovakia) Karol Beck (quarterfinals)
4. (France) Nicolas Mahut (semifinals)
5. (India) Prakash Amritraj (second round)
6. (Turkey) Marsel İlhan (quarterfinals)
7. (Slovakia) Lukáš Lacko (quarterfinals)
8. (Australia) Brydan Klein (first round)

== Draw ==
=== Key ===
- Q = Qualifier
- WC = Wild card
- LL = Lucky loser
- Alt = Alternate
- SE = Special exempt
- PR = Protected ranking
- ITF = ITF entry
- JE = Junior exempt
- w/o = Walkover
- r = Retired
- d = Defaulted
- SR = Special ranking

=== Final four ===
Semifinals
(United Kingdom) Alex Bogdanovic	5	1^{r}
Q	(Netherlands) Igor Sijsling	6	3
4	(France) Nicolas Mahut	3	7	4
2	(Belgium) Olivier Rochus	6	5	6

Final
Q	(Netherlands) Igor Sijsling	3	6	2
2	(Belgium) Olivier Rochus	6	4	6

=== Top half ===
First round
1	(Ukraine) S Stakhovsky	7	3	2
(Austria) A Peya	5	6	6
(Australia) R Smeets	4	6^{4}
(United Kingdom) A Bogdanovic	6	7
Q	(United Kingdom) J Marray	2	3
(United Kingdom) D Evans	6	6
(Czech Republic) P Šnobel	6	4	2
6	(Turkey) M İlhan	4	6	6
3	(Slovakia) K Beck	6	4	6
WC	(United Kingdom) C Fleming	4	6	2
(United Kingdom) J Goodall	6	6
Q	(South Africa) A Anderson	4	4
(Belgium) R Bemelmans	7	5	0^{r}
Q	(Netherlands) I Sijsling	6^{4}	7	0
(Italy) R Ghedin	6	6^{5}	6
8	(Australia) B Klein	0	7	2

Second round
(Austria) A Peya	6^{3}	6	3
(United Kingdom) A Bogdanovic	7	3	6
(United Kingdom) D Evans	3	6	1
6	(Turkey) M İlhan	6	2	6
3	(Slovakia) K Beck	4	6	7
(United Kingdom) J Goodall	6	3	6^{5}
Q	(Netherlands) I Sijsling	4	6	6
(Italy) R Ghedin	6	4	2

Quarterfinals
(United Kingdom) A Bogdanovic	4	7	6
6	(Turkey) M İlhan	6	6^{5}	4
3	(Slovakia) K Beck	4	4
Q	(Netherlands) I Sijsling	6	6

Semifinals
(United Kingdom) A Bogdanovic	5	1^{r}
Q	(Netherlands) I Sijsling	7	3

=== Bottom half ===
First round
7	(Slovakia) L Lacko	6	6
WC	(United Kingdom) D Smethurst	4	4
WC	(United Kingdom) A Hewitt	2	0
(Canada) P-L Duclos	6	6
Q	(France) O Charroin	5	6	5
(Netherlands) M Koning	7	3	7
WC	(United Kingdom) D Cox	4	5
4	(France) N Mahut	6	7
5	(India) P Amritraj	4	6	6
(United Kingdom) C Eaton	6	3	4
(Austria) M Fischer	7	1	6
(Republic of Ireland) C Niland	6^{4}	6	2
(Switzerland) G Bastl	5	6	2
(Denmark) F Nielsen	7	2	6
(Ukraine) S Bubka	7	2	4
2	(Belgium) O Rochus	6^{3}	6	6

Second round
7	(Slovakia) L Lacko	6	6
(Canada) P-L Duclos	4	4
(Netherlands) M Koning	3	4
4	(France) N Mahut	6	6
5	(India) P Amritraj	4	3
(Austria) M Fischer	6	6
(Denmark) F Nielsen	3	3
2	(Belgium) O Rochus	6	6

Quarterfinals
7	(Slovakia) L Lacko	3	4
4	(France) N Mahut	6	6
(Austria) M Fischer	4	2
2	(Belgium) O Rochus	6	6

Semifinals
4	(France) N Mahut	3	7	4
2	(Belgium) O Rochus	6	5	6
