= 2015 Aegon Manchester Trophy – Singles =

Singles
- 2015 Aegon Manchester Trophy

Final
- Champion: (Australia) Sam Groth
- Runner-up: (Australia) Luke Saville
- Score: 7–5, 6–1

Events
Singles	Doubles
Aegon Manchester Trophy	· 2016 →

This was the first edition of the Aegon Manchester Trophy. Sam Groth won the title, defeating Luke Saville 7–5, 6–1 in the final.

== Seeds ==
1. (Cyprus) Marcos Baghdatis (second round)
2. (Australia) Sam Groth (champion)
3. (Tunisia) Malek Jaziri (first round)
4. (Belgium) Ruben Bemelmans (first round)
5. (United Kingdom) James Ward (quarterfinals)
6. (Japan) Tatsuma Ito (first round)
7. (Colombia) Alejandro Falla (second round)
8. (United States) Austin Krajicek (first round)

== Draw ==
=== Key ===
- Q = Qualifier
- WC = Wild card
- LL = Lucky loser
- Alt = Alternate
- ITF = ITF entry
- PR = Protected ranking
- SR = Special ranking
- SE = Special exempt
- JE = Junior exempt
- JR = Junior Accelerator Programme entrant
- CO = College Accelerator Programme entrant
- NG = Next Gen Accelerator Program entrant
- w/o = Walkover
- r = Retired
- d = Defaulted

=== Finals ===
Semifinals
(Australia) Luke Saville	6^{4}	7^{7}	6
(Russia) Konstantin Kravchuk	7^{7}	6^{4}	3
(United States) Rajeev Ram	6	6^{2}	0^{r}
2	(Australia) Sam Groth	4	7^{7}	0

Final
(Australia) Luke Saville	5	1
2	(Australia) Sam Groth	7	6

=== Top half ===
First round
1	(Cyprus) M Baghdatis	6	6
WC	(United Kingdom) M Willis	4	2
WC	(United Kingdom) D Cox	2	7	6^{3}
(United Kingdom) B Klein	6	5	7^{7}
Q	(France) F Martin	4	3
(Australia) L Saville	6	6
WC	(United Kingdom) D Smethurst	3	1
7	(Colombia) A Falla	6	6
3	(Tunisia) M Jaziri	4	2
Q	(Australia) M Reid	6	6
Q	(Australia) A Bolt	7^{7}	3	6^{7}
(Australia) M Ebden	6^{5}	6	7^{9}
(Australia) J-P Smith	6	3	6
(Belgium) N Desein	4	6	3
(Russia) K Kravchuk	7^{8}	2	6
6	(Japan) T Ito	6^{6}	6	4

Second round
1	(Cyprus) M Baghdatis	3	7^{7}	6^{5}
(United Kingdom) B Klein	6	6^{4}	7^{7}
(Australia) L Saville	0	7^{7}	6
7	(Colombia) A Falla	6	6^{2}	3
Q	(Australia) M Reid	1	6^{6}
(Australia) M Ebden	6	7^{8}
(Australia) J-P Smith	4	4
(Russia) K Kravchuk	6	6

Quarterfinals
(United Kingdom) B Klein	6	4	4
(Australia) L Saville	4	6	6
(Australia) M Ebden	6^{4}	6	5
(Russia) K Kravchuk	7^{7}	4	7

Semifinals
(Australia) L Saville	6^{4}	7^{7}	6
(Russia) K Kravchuk	7^{7}	6^{4}	3

=== Bottom half ===
First round
8	(United States) A Krajicek	4	6^{5}
WC	(United Kingdom) J Milton	6	7^{7}
(Japan) H Moriya	0	7^{7}	6
(United Kingdom) L Broady	6	6^{4}	1
Q	(Denmark) F Nielsen	6	5	6
(United States) R Harrison	1	7	2
(United States) R Ram	6	6
4	(Belgium) R Bemelmans	4	4
5	(United Kingdom) J Ward	6^{0}	7^{7}	7^{7}
(Netherlands) I Sijsling	7^{7}	6^{5}	6^{5}
(United States) D Novikov	4	6	6
Alt	(Australia) J Thompson	6	4	0
(Chinese Taipei) J Wang	7	2	6
Alt	(United Kingdom) E Corrie	5	6	3
(Australia) B Mitchell	2	3
2	(Australia) S Groth	6	6

Second round
WC	(United Kingdom) J Milton	3	6	6
(Japan) H Moriya	6	1	1
Q	(Denmark) F Nielsen	2	6^{6}
(United States) R Ram	6	7^{8}
5	(United Kingdom) J Ward	7^{8}	6
(United States) D Novikov	6^{6}	4
(Chinese Taipei) J Wang	2	3
2	(Australia) S Groth	6	6

Quarterfinals
WC	(United Kingdom) J Milton	5	2
(United States) R Ram	7	6
5	(United Kingdom) J Ward	6^{3}	3
2	(Australia) S Groth	7^{7}	6

Semifinals
(United States) R Ram	6	6^{2}	0^{r}
2	(Australia) S Groth	4	7^{7}	0
