= Kenneth Carlsen =

Danish tennis player

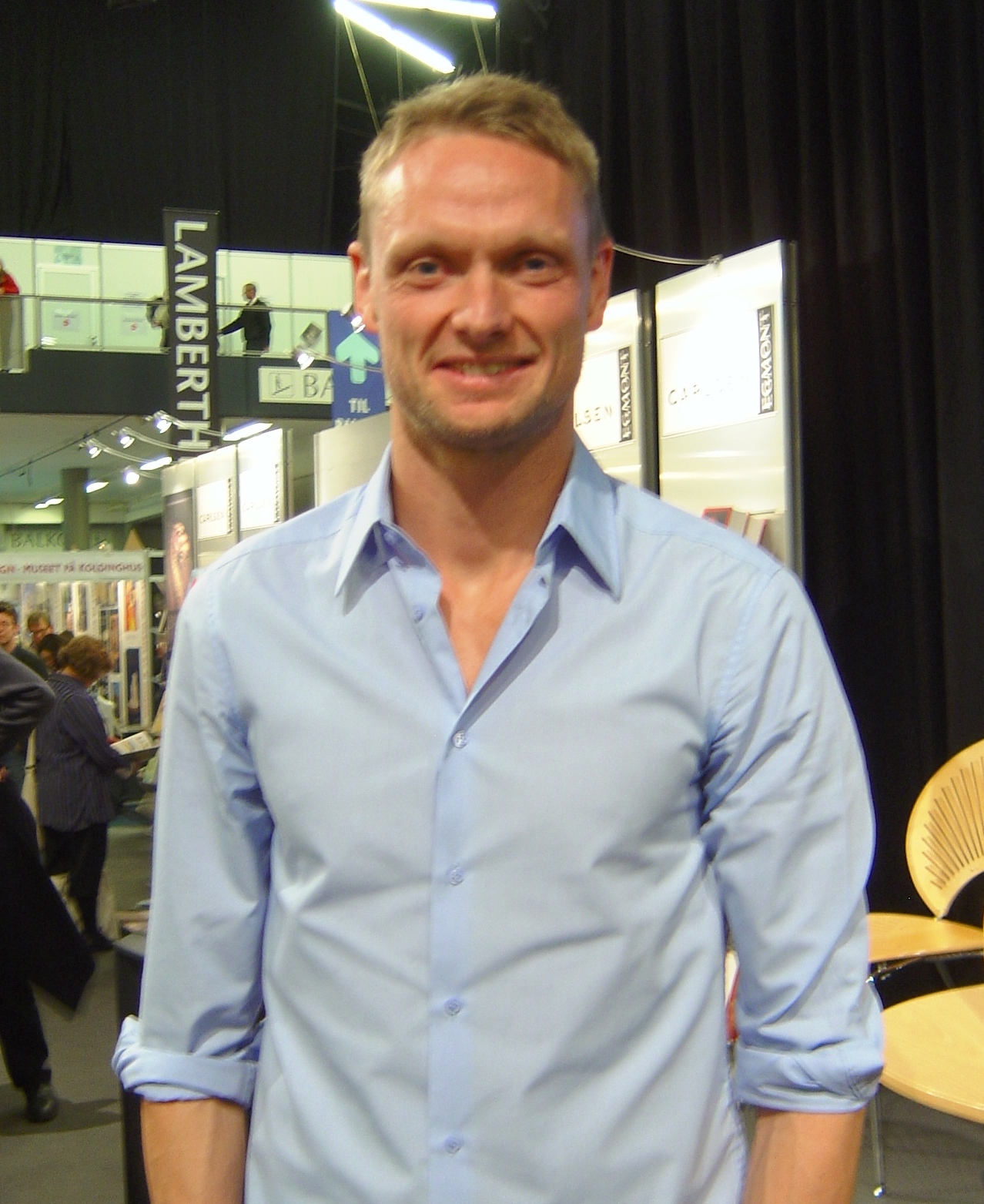
- Country (sports): Denmark
- Residence: Monte Carlo, Monaco
- Born: 17 April 1973 (age 53) Copenhagen, Denmark
- Height: 1.91 m (6 ft 3 in)
- Turned pro: 1992
- Retired: 2007
- Plays: Left-handed (one-handed backhand)
- Prize money: $2,990,980

Singles
- Career record: 266–288 (at ATP Tour-level, Grand Slam-level, and in Davis Cup)
- Career titles: 3
- Highest ranking: No. 41 (7 June 1993)

Grand Slam singles results
- Australian Open: 4R (1993)
- French Open: 2R (1993, 1994)
- Wimbledon: 3R (1993, 1994, 2004)
- US Open: 3R (1995)

Other tournaments
- Olympic Games: 3R (1996)

Doubles
- Career record: 40–62 (at ATP Tour-level, Grand Slam-level, and in Davis Cup)
- Career titles: 0
- Highest ranking: No. 134 (5 April 2004)

Kenneth Carlsen (Danish: [ˈkʰenəð̞ˠ ˈkʰɑːlˀsn̩]; (born 17 April 1973) is a Danish former professional tennis player, who was active between 1992 and 2007. Carlsen played left-handed with a one-handed backhand. His greatest asset was his powerful serve, and his game was therefore best suited to fast surfaces (grass and hardcourt). For most of his long career, Carlsen was Denmark's best tennis player, and consistently among the few Danish players playing at the highest international level. He was awarded as best Danish "Tennis Player of the Year" seven times by the Danish Tennis Federation (first time in 1991, last time in 2005). Two times the award went to the Danish Davis Cup team, of which Kenneth Carlsen until 2003 was a central part (having a 29–13 record in singles).

== Career ==
Carlsen began playing tennis at age nine, and in his teens became one of the best juniors in the world. He finished as No. 3 in the world in 1991. He turned full-time professional in 1992, and his breakthrough as senior in a major tournament came at the Copenhagen Open where he beat top-20 player Alexander Volkov in the first round. Later that year, he reached the final in Brisbane—it was only his fourth ATP Tour tournament. His debut in the 1993 Australian Open confirmed his position among the best players in the world as he went to the fourth round. The same year he reached his career-best singles ranking as world No. 41 in June. Since 1993, he was for most of the time ranked within the top 100. In 1994, he played the most famous match of his career when he beat Stefan Edberg in five sets at Wimbledon.

In 1996, he reached the final of the tournament that triggered his career, Copenhagen Open, but lost to Cédric Pioline. The next year, he reached the final in Auckland, but this time lost to Jonas Björkman. This saw his ranking shoot up 20 spots to world No. 52. In 1999, Carlsen reached the final in Newport, but lost to Chris Woodruff.

In 2000, he suffered from a serious shoulder injury, and underwent surgery twice. As a result, he did not play any tournaments that year. His recovery was relatively slow, and he could not return to professional tennis until June 2001. His long absence from the sport, however, did not seem to affect his playing negatively. In 2002, he won his second ATP tournament in Tokyo, and in 2005 he won the Regions Morgan Keegan Championship in Memphis at almost 32 years old. His resurgence saw him in June 2005 become world No. 50.

Carlsen rarely played doubles, but reached three ATP doubles finals in his career: Copenhagen with Frederik Fetterlein in 1997 (lost to Andrei Olhovskiy/Brett Steven), Tashkent, Uzbekistan with Sjeng Schalken in 1998 (lost to Stefano Pescosolido/Laurence Tieleman), and Beijing with Michael Berrer in 2006 (lost to Mario Ančić/Mahesh Bhupathi).

He played a total of 46 Grand Slam events during his career, and used to hold the record for most first-round exits for a long time: 30. But he was surpassed by Albert Montañés at 2014 Australian Open where he reached 31 career Grand Slam first-round exits.

On 27 June 2007 he announced that he would retire from professional tennis, and he played his last ATP match in first round of the Stockholm Open on 10 October 2007. The week after, he played his final professional tennis match at a Challenger tournament in Kolding, Denmark.

In November 2008, Carlsen was appointed captain of the Denmark Davis Cup team. Under his guidance the Danes returned in 2011 to the Europe/Africa Zone Group I.

== Career finals ==
=== Singles: 7 (3 wins, 4 losses) ===
Result	W-L	Date	Tournament	Surface	Opponent	Score
Loss	0–1	Sep 1992	Brisbane, Australia	Hard (i)	(France) Guillaume Raoux	4–6, 6–7^{(10–12)}
Loss	0–2	Mar 1996	Copenhagen, Denmark	Carpet (i)	(France) Cédric Pioline	2–6, 6–7^{(7–9)}
Loss	0–3	Jan 1997	Auckland, New Zealand	Hard	(Sweden) Jonas Björkman	6–7^{(7–9)}, 0–6
Win	1–3	Apr 1998	Hong Kong, China	Hard	(Zimbabwe) Byron Black	6–2, 6–0
Loss	1–4	Jul 1999	Newport, USA	Grass	(United States) Chris Woodruff	7–6^{(7–5)}, 4–6, 4–6
Win	2–4	Sep 2002	Tokyo, Japan	Hard	(Sweden) Magnus Norman	7–6^{(8–6)}, 6–3
Win	3–4	Feb 2005	Memphis, USA	Hard (i)	(Belarus) Max Mirnyi	7–5, 7–5

== Grand Slam performance timeline ==
Key
W	F	SF	QF	#R	RR	Q#	DNQ	A	NH

(W) winner; (F) finalist; (SF) semifinalist; (QF) quarterfinalist; (#R) rounds 4, 3, 2, 1; (RR) round-robin stage; (Q#) qualification round; (DNQ) did not qualify; (A) absent; (NH) not held; (SR) strike rate (events won / competed); (W–L) win–loss record.

Tournament	1993	1994	1995	1996	1997	1998	1999	2000	2001	2002	2003	2004	2005	2006	2007	W–L
Australian Open	4R	2R	2R	1R	1R	1R	1R	A	A	1R	1R	1R	1R	1R	A	5–12
French Open	2R	1R	2R	1R	1R	1R	1R	A	A	A	1R	1R	1R	1R	A	2–11
Wimbledon	3R	3R	2R	1R	1R	1R	A	A	2R	1R	1R	3R	1R	A	A	8–11
US Open	1R	1R	3R	2R	2R	1R	2R	A	1R	2R	2R	1R	1R	A	A	7–12
Win–loss	6–4	3–4	5–4	1–4	1–4	0–4	1–3	0–0	1–2	1–3	1–4	2–4	0–4	0–2	0–0	22–46
