= 2019 Manchester Trophy – Doubles =

Doubles
- 2019 Manchester Trophy

Final
- Champions: (China) Duan Yingying (China) Zhu Lin
- Runners-up: (United States) Robin Anderson (Romania) Laura Ioana Paar
- Score: 6–4, 6–3

Events
Singles	Doubles
← 2018 ·	Manchester Trophy	· 2020 →

Luksika Kumkhum and Prarthana Thombare were the doubles defending champions at the 2019 edition of the Manchester Trophy, but Kumkhum chose not to participate. Thombare partnered alongside Tereza Smitková, but lost in the first round to Quinn Gleason and Ingrid Neel.

Duan Yingying and Zhu Lin won the title, defeating Robin Anderson and Laura Ioana Paar in the final, 6–4, 6–3.

== Seeds ==
1. (United Kingdom) Naomi Broady / (United States) Asia Muhammad (semifinals)
2. (China) Jiang Xinyu / (China) Tang Qianhui (semifinals)
3. (United States) Quinn Gleason / (United States) Ingrid Neel (quarterfinals)
4. (Russia) Anna Blinkova / (Poland) Magda Linette (first round)

== Draw ==
=== Key ===
- Q = Qualifier
- WC = Wild card
- LL = Lucky loser
- Alt = Alternate
- ITF = ITF entry
- PR = Protected ranking
- SR = Special ranking
- SE = Special exempt
- JE = Junior exempt
- JR = Junior Accelerator Programme entrant
- CO = College Accelerator Programme entrant
- NG = Next Gen Accelerator Program entrant
- w/o = Walkover
- r = Retired
- d = Defaulted

=== Draw ===
First round
1	(United Kingdom) N Broady (United States) A Muhammad	6	6
(Czech Republic) M Bouzková (Germany) V Heisen	2	3
(Bulgaria) V Tomova (United States) S Vickery	5	0
WC	(United Kingdom) A Barnett (United Kingdom) O Nicholls	7	6
4	(Russia) A Blinkova (Poland) M Linette	2	1
(United States) A Li (Brazil) L Stefani	6	6
WC	(United Kingdom) G Taylor (United Kingdom) E Webley-Smith	4	2
(United States) R Anderson (Romania) LI Paar	6	6
(United States) K Ahn (Australia) L Cabrera	2	6	[5]
(China) Y Duan (China) L Zhu	6	2	[10]
(Czech Republic) T Smitková (India) P Thombare	4	3
3	(United States) Q Gleason (United States) I Neel	6	6
(United States) M Brengle (United States) J Loeb	4	6	[8]
WC	(United Kingdom) E Appleton (United Kingdom) S Murray	6	2	[10]
(United States) W Osuigwe (United States) M Sanchez	4	6	[8]
2	(China) X Jiang (China) Q Tang	6	2	[10]

Quarterfinals
1	(United Kingdom) N Broady (United States) A Muhammad	6	6
WC	(United Kingdom) A Barnett (United Kingdom) O Nicholls	3	4
(United States) A Li (Brazil) L Stefani	4	6	[6]
(United States) R Anderson (Romania) LI Paar	6	3	[10]
(China) Y Duan (China) L Zhu	6	4	[10]
3	(United States) Q Gleason (United States) I Neel	2	6	[7]
WC	(United Kingdom) E Appleton (United Kingdom) S Murray	3	4
2	(China) X Jiang (China) Q Tang	6	6

Semifinals
1	(United Kingdom) N Broady (United States) A Muhammad	3	7^{7}	[10]
(United States) R Anderson (Romania) LI Paar	6	6^{4}	[12]
(China) Y Duan (China) L Zhu	6	3	[10]
2	(China) X Jiang (China) Q Tang	4	6	[6]

Final
(United States) R Anderson (Romania) LI Paar	4	3
(China) Y Duan (China) L Zhu	6	6
