= 2019 Manchester Trophy – Singles =

Singles
- 2019 Manchester Trophy

Final
- Champion: (Poland) Magda Linette
- Runner-up: (Kazakhstan) Zarina Diyas
- Score: 7–6^{(7–1)}, 2–6, 6–3

Events
Singles	Doubles
← 2018 ·	Manchester Trophy	· 2020 →

Ons Jabeur was the defending champion, but chose to participate in Rosmalen instead.

Magda Linette won the title, defeating Zarina Diyas in the final, 7–6^{(7–1)}, 2–6, 6–3.

== Seeds ==
1. (Poland) Magda Linette (champion)
2. (United States) Madison Brengle (semifinals)
3. (Kazakhstan) Zarina Diyas (final)
4. (China) Zhu Lin (first round)
5. (Japan) Misaki Doi (second round)
6. (Russia) Anna Blinkova (second round)
7. (Czech Republic) Marie Bouzková (second round)
8. (United States) Whitney Osuigwe (second round)

== Draw ==
=== Key ===
- Q = Qualifier
- WC = Wild card
- LL = Lucky loser
- Alt = Alternate
- SE = Special exempt
- PR = Protected ranking
- ITF = ITF entry
- JE = Junior exempt
- w/o = Walkover
- r = Retired
- d = Defaulted
- SR = Special ranking

=== Finals ===
Semifinals
1	(Poland) Magda Linette	6	6
Q	(United Kingdom) Samantha Murray	3	0
3	(Kazakhstan) Zarina Diyas	6	7
2	(United States) Madison Brengle	1	5

Final
1	(Poland) Magda Linette	7^{7}	2	6
3	(Kazakhstan) Zarina Diyas	6^{1}	6	3

=== Top half ===
First round
1	(Poland) M Linette	6	6
(United States) A Li	3	3
Q	(Japan) M Hibi	6	3	5
(United States) S Vickery	4	6	7
Q	(Japan) YL Miyazaki	6	5	3
(Australia) L Cabrera	0	7	6
(United Kingdom) K Dunne	1^{r}
8	(United States) W Osuigwe	2
4	(China) L Zhu	3	3
WC	(United Kingdom) N Broady	6	6
WC	(United Kingdom) G Taylor	0	6	7^{7}
(Bulgaria) V Tomova	6	4	6^{4}
Q	(United Kingdom) S Murray	6	7^{7}
(United States) A Muhammad	3	6^{1}
WC	(United Kingdom) A Barnett	3	1
7	(Czech Republic) M Bouzková	6	6

Second round
1	(Poland) M Linette	7^{7}	4
(United States) S Vickery	6^{5}	2^{r}
(Australia) L Cabrera	6	6
8	(United States) W Osuigwe	4	4
WC	(United Kingdom) N Broady	6	6
WC	(United Kingdom) G Taylor	2	4
Q	(United Kingdom) S Murray	7	6
7	(Czech Republic) M Bouzková	5	4

Quarterfinals
1	(Poland) M Linette	6	7
(Australia) L Cabrera	2	5
WC	(United Kingdom) N Broady	6^{4}	2
Q	(United Kingdom) S Murray	7^{7}	6

Semifinals
1	(Poland) M Linette	6	6
Q	(United Kingdom) S Murray	3	0

=== Bottom half ===
First round
5	(Japan) M Doi	6	6
(France) M Georges	2	4
Q	(United States) I Neel	3	2
(China) Xiy Wang	6	6
(United States) K Ahn	6^{9}	1
(United States) R Anderson	7^{11}	6
(United States) J Loeb	3	4
3	(Kazakhstan) Z Diyas	6	6
6	(Russia) A Blinkova	6	6
(Czech Republic) T Smitková	3	3
WC	(United Kingdom) E Webley-Smith	1	3
(Canada) K Sebov	6	6
Q	(Australia) M Inglis	5	3
(Hungary) T Babos	7	6
Q	(Germany) V Heisen	5	3
2	(United States) M Brengle	7	6

Second round
5	(Japan) M Doi	2	6	3
(China) Xiy Wang	6	4	6
(United States) R Anderson	0	1
3	(Kazakhstan) Z Diyas	6	6
6	(Russia) A Blinkova	6	4	4
(Canada) K Sebov	2	6	6
(Hungary) T Babos	4	6	3
2	(United States) M Brengle	6	4	6

Quarterfinals
(China) Xiy Wang	6^{1}	2
3	(Kazakhstan) Z Diyas	7^{7}	6
(Canada) K Sebov	1	1
2	(United States) M Brengle	6	6

Semifinals
3	(Kazakhstan) Z Diyas	6	7
2	(United States) M Brengle	1	5
