= 2015 Aegon Manchester Trophy – Doubles =

Doubles
- 2015 Aegon Manchester Trophy

Final
- Champion: (Australia) Chris Guccione (Brazil) André Sá
- Runner-up: (South Africa) Raven Klaasen (United States) Rajeev Ram
- Score: Walkover

Events
Singles	Doubles
Aegon Manchester Trophy	· 2016 →

This was the first edition of the event. Chris Guccione and André Sá won the title when Raven Klaasen and Rajeev Ram withdrew from the final.

== Seeds ==
1. (South Africa) Raven Klaasen / (United States) Rajeev Ram (final, withdrew)
2. (Australia) Chris Guccione / (Brazil) André Sá (champion)
3. (Croatia) Mate Pavić / (New Zealand) Michael Venus (quarterfinals)
4. (United Kingdom) Colin Fleming / (Australia) John-Patrick Smith (quarterfinals)

== Draw ==
=== Key ===
- Q = Qualifier
- WC = Wild card
- LL = Lucky loser
- Alt = Alternate
- SE = Special exempt
- PR = Protected ranking
- ITF = ITF entry
- JE = Junior exempt
- w/o = Walkover
- r = Retired
- d = Defaulted
- SR = Special ranking

=== Draw ===
First round
1	(South Africa) R Klassen (United States) R Ram	6	6
(Belgium) N Desein (Japan) H Moriya	3	2
(France) F Martin (India) P Raja	6	6^{3}	[10]
WC	(United Kingdom) S Clayton (United Kingdom) Richard Gabb	3	7^{7}	[7]
4	(United Kingdom) C Fleming (Australia) J-P Smith	4	6	[10]
(Australia) A Bolt (Australia) L Saville	6	2	[5]
(United Kingdom) K Skupski (United Kingdom) N Skupski	6^{2}	6	[10]
(Australia) M Ebden (United Kingdom) J Ward	7^{7}	4	[4]
WC	(United Kingdom) E Corrie (United Kingdom) D Smethurst	6	7^{7}
(United Kingdom) S Thornley (United Kingdom) D Walsh	4	6^{4}
(Tunisia) M Jaziri (United States) D Novikov	7^{7}	5	[5]
3	(Croatia) M Pavić (New Zealand) M Venus	6^{2}	7	[10]
(United Kingdom) B Klein (India) D Sharan	3	7^{7}	[9]
WC	(United Kingdom) L Bambridge (United Kingdom) L Broady	6	6^{2}	[11]
(United States) R Harrison (Australia) M Reid	3	7^{7}	[5]
2	(Australia) C Guccione (Brazil) A Sá	6	6^{5}	[10]

Quarterfinals
1	(South Africa) R Klassen (United States) R Ram	3	7^{7}	[11]
(France) F Martin (India) P Raja	6	6^{4}	[9]
4	(United Kingdom) C Fleming (Australia) J-P Smith	6^{9}	7^{7}	[10]
(United Kingdom) K Skupski (United Kingdom) N Skupski	7^{11}	6^{2}	[12]
WC	(United Kingdom) E Corrie (United Kingdom) D Smethurst	6	6
3	(Croatia) M Pavić (New Zealand) M Venus	3	4
WC	(United Kingdom) L Bambridge (United Kingdom) L Broady	1	3
2	(Australia) C Guccione (Brazil) A Sá	6	6

Semifinals
1	(South Africa) R Klassen (United States) R Ram	6	6
(United Kingdom) K Skupski (United Kingdom) N Skupski	4	4
WC	(United Kingdom) E Corrie (United Kingdom) D Smethurst	4	6	[5]
2	(Australia) C Guccione (Brazil) A Sá	6	2	[10]

Final
1	(South Africa) R Klassen (United States) R Ram
2	(Australia) C Guccione (Brazil) A Sá	w/o
