= 2017 Aegon Manchester Trophy – Singles =

Singles
- 2017 Aegon Manchester Trophy

Final
- Champion: (Kazakhstan) Zarina Diyas
- Runner-up: (Serbia) Aleksandra Krunić
- Score: 6–4, 6–4

Events
| Singles | Doubles |
| Aegon Manchester Trophy | · 2018 → |

This was the first edition of the women's event at the Aegon Manchester Trophy.

Zarina Diyas won the title, defeating Aleksandra Krunić 6–4, 6–4 in the final.

== Seeds ==
1. (Chinese Taipei) Chang Kai-chen (quarterfinals)
2. (Belgium) Maryna Zanevska (second round, retired)
3. (Belgium) Alison Van Uytvanck (second round)
4. (Belarus) Aryna Sabalenka (semifinals)
5. (Russia) Anna Blinkova (quarterfinals)
6. (United Kingdom) Naomi Broady (semifinals)
7. (Serbia) Aleksandra Krunić (final)
8. (South Korea) Jang Su-jeong (first round)

== Draw ==
=== Key ===
- Q = Qualifier
- WC = Wild card
- LL = Lucky loser
- Alt = Alternate
- ITF = ITF entry
- PR = Protected ranking
- SR = Special ranking
- SE = Special exempt
- JE = Junior exempt
- JR = Junior Accelerator Programme entrant
- CO = College Accelerator Programme entrant
- NG = Next Gen Accelerator Program entrant
- w/o = Walkover
- r = Retired
- d = Defaulted

=== Finals ===
Semifinals
6 | (United Kingdom) Naomi Broady | 3 | 4
(Kazakhstan) Zarina Diyas | 6 | 6
4 | (Belarus) Aryna Sabalenka | 0 | 2
7 | (Serbia) Aleksandra Krunić | 6 | 6

Final
(Kazakhstan) Zarina Diyas | 6 | 6
7 | (Serbia) Aleksandra Krunić | 4 | 4

=== Top half ===
First round
1 | (Chinese Taipei) K-c Chang | 6 | 6
(United States) D Lao | 3 | 3
WC | (United Kingdom) K Swan | 4 | 7 | 2
(United Kingdom) K Dunne | 6 | 5 | 6
Q | (United States) M Sanchez | 6 | 6
Q | (Russia) V Savinykh | 3 | 4
(India) A Raina | 3 | 4
6 | (United Kingdom) N Broady | 6 | 6
3 | (Belgium) A Van Uytvanck | 6 | 6
(Belgium) A-S Mestach | 3 | 3
(Poland) M Fręch | 5 | 6 | 6
(United Kingdom) H Dart | 7 | 3 | 3
(Kazakhstan) Z Diyas | 6 | 6
LL | (United Kingdom) E Webley-Smith | 4 | 1
(Australia) Ar Rodionova | 6 | 4 | 6
8 | (South Korea) S-j Jang | 2 | 6 | 1

Second round
1 | (Chinese Taipei) K-c Chang | 6 | 4 | 6
(United Kingdom) K Dunne | 3 | 6 | 1
Q | (United States) M Sanchez | 6^{3} | 6^{7}
6 | (United Kingdom) N Broady | 7^{7} | 7^{9}
3 | (Belgium) A Van Uytvanck | 1 | 6 | 4
(Poland) M Fręch | 6 | 1 | 6
(Kazakhstan) Z Diyas | 6 | 6
(Australia) Ar Rodionova | 2 | 3

Quarterfinals
1 | (Chinese Taipei) K-c Chang | 3 | 4
6 | (United Kingdom) N Broady | 6 | 6
(Poland) M Fręch | 1 | 0
(Kazakhstan) Z Diyas | 6 | 6

Semifinals
6 | (United Kingdom) N Broady | 3 | 4
(Kazakhstan) Z Diyas | 6 | 6

=== Bottom half ===
First round
5 | (Russia) A Blinkova | 6 | 6
(Italy) J Paolini | 0 | 2
Q | (Germany) V Heisen | 3 | 7^{7} | 6
WC | (United Kingdom) E Appleton | 6 | 6^{4} | 2
PR | (Russia) A Kudryavtseva | 6 | 2 | 3
(Canada) B Andreescu | 4 | 6 | 6
(Slovakia) V Kužmová | 3 | 6^{3}
4 | (Belarus) A Sabalenka | 6 | 7^{7}
7 | (Serbia) A Krunić | 5 | 6 | 6
(New Zealand) M Erakovic | 7 | 3 | 2
WC | (United Kingdom) K Boulter | 6 | 3 | 6
Q | (United Kingdom) S Murray | 4 | 6 | 3
(Netherlands) L Kerkhove | 4 | 3
(United Kingdom) G Taylor | 6 | 6
(Japan) A Omae | 5 | 2
2 | (Belgium) M Zanevska | 7 | 6

Second round
5 | (Russia) A Blinkova | 6 | 6
Q | (Germany) V Heisen | 0 | 1
(Canada) B Andreescu | 6 | 4 | 3
4 | (Belarus) A Sabalenka | 2 | 6 | 6
7 | (Serbia) A Krunić | 6 | 6
WC | (United Kingdom) K Boulter | 2 | 4
(United Kingdom) G Taylor | 7^{7} | 3
2 | (Belgium) M Zanevska | 6^{4} | 2^{r}

Quarterfinals
5 | (Russia) A Blinkova | 6^{6} | 7 | 3
4 | (Belarus) A Sabalenka | 7^{8} | 5 | 6
7 | (Serbia) A Krunić | 6 | 6
(United Kingdom) G Taylor | 4 | 1

Semifinals
4 | (Belarus) A Sabalenka | 0 | 2
7 | (Serbia) A Krunić | 6 | 6
