= 2015 Aegon Manchester Trophy =

- Date: 1–7 June
- Edition: 1st
- Draw: 32S / 16D
- Prize money: €42,500
- Surface: Grass
- Location: Manchester, United Kingdom

Champions

Singles
- (Australia) Sam Groth

Doubles
- (Australia) Chris Guccione / (Brazil) André Sá
| Aegon Manchester Trophy | · 2016 → |

The 2015 Aegon Manchester Trophy was a professional tennis tournament played on grass courts. It was the 1st edition of the revived tournament, forming part of the 2015 ATP Challenger Tour. It took place in Manchester, United Kingdom between 1 and 7 June 2015.

== Singles main-draw entrants ==
=== Seeds ===
| Country | Player | Rank^{1} | Seed |
|---|---|---|---|
| CYP | Marcos Baghdatis | 59 | 1 |
| AUS | Sam Groth | 72 | 2 |
| TUN | Malek Jaziri | 85 | 3 |
| BEL | Ruben Bemelmans | 95 | 4 |
| GBR | James Ward | 104 | 5 |
| JPN | Tatsuma Ito | 106 | 6 |
| COL | Alejandro Falla | 109 | 7 |
| SLO | Austin Krajicek | 118 | 8 |

- ^{1} Rankings are as of May 25, 2015.

=== Other entrants ===
The following players received wildcards into the singles main draw:

- (United Kingdom) Daniel Cox
- (United Kingdom) Joshua Milton
- (United Kingdom) Daniel Smethurst
- (United Kingdom) Marcus Willis

The following players received entry as alternates:

- (Australia) Jordan Thompson
- (United Kingdom) Edward Corrie

The following players received entry from the qualifying draw:

- (Australia) Alex Bolt
- (France) Fabrice Martin
- (Denmark) Frederik Nielsen
- (Australia) Matt Reid

== Doubles main-draw entrants ==
=== Seeds ===
| Country | Player | Country | Player | Rank^{1} | Seed |
|---|---|---|---|---|---|
| RSA | Raven Klaasen | USA | Rajeev Ram | 70 | 1 |
| AUS | Chris Guccione | BRA | André Sá | 102 | 2 |
| CRO | Mate Pavić | NZL | Michael Venus | 112 | 3 |
| GBR | Colin Fleming | AUS | John-Patrick Smith | 182 | 4 |

- ^{1} Rankings as of May 25, 2015.

=== Other entrants ===
The following pairs received wildcards into the doubles main draw:

- (United Kingdom) Luke Bambridge / (United Kingdom) Liam Broady
- (United Kingdom) Scott Clayton / (United Kingdom) Richard Gabb
- (United Kingdom) Edward Corrie / (United Kingdom) Daniel Smethurst

== Champions ==
=== Singles ===
- (Australia) Sam Groth def. (Australia) Luke Saville, 7–5, 6–1

=== Doubles ===
- (Australia) Chris Guccione / (Brazil) André Sá def. (South Africa) Raven Klaasen / (United States) Rajeev Ram by walkover
