= 2017 Aegon Manchester Trophy =

- Date: 12–18 June
- Edition: 3rd
- Category: ITF Women's Circuit
- Prize money: $100,000
- Surface: Grass
- Location: Manchester, United Kingdom

Champions

Singles
- (Kazakhstan) Zarina Diyas

Doubles
- (Poland) Magdalena Fręch / (Belgium) An-Sophie Mestach
← 2016 ·	Aegon Manchester Trophy	· 2018 →

The 2017 Aegon Manchester Trophy is a professional tennis tournament played on outdoor grass courts. It is the first edition of the women's tournament and part of the 2017 ITF Women's Circuit, offering a total of $100,000 in prize money. It takes place in Manchester, United Kingdom, from 12–18 June 2017.

== Point distribution ==
Event	W	F	SF	QF	Round of 16	Round of 32	Q	Q2	Q3
Singles	140	85	50	25	13	1	6	4	1
Doubles	140	85	50	25	1	—	—	—	—

== Singles main draw entrants ==
=== Seeds ===
Country	Player	Rank^{1}	Seed
TPE	Chang Kai-chen	108	1
BEL	Maryna Zanevska	112	2
BEL	Alison Van Uytvanck	113	3
BLR	Aryna Sabalenka	116	4
RUS	Anna Blinkova	122	5
GBR	Naomi Broady	123	6
SRB	Aleksandra Krunić	124	7
KOR	Jang Su-jeong	126	8

- ^{1} Rankings as of 29 May 2017

=== Other entrants ===
The following players received wildcards into the singles main draw:

- (United Kingdom) Emily Appleton
- (United Kingdom) Katie Boulter
- (United Kingdom) Katie Swan

The following player received entry into the singles main draw by a protected ranking:

- (Russia) Alla Kudryavtseva

The following players received entry from the qualifying draw:

- (Germany) Vivian Heisen
- (United Kingdom) Samantha Murray
- (United States) Maria Sanchez
- (Russia) Valeria Savinykh

The following player received entry as a lucky loser:

- (United Kingdom) Emily Webley-Smith

== Champions ==
=== Singles ===
- (Kazakhstan) Zarina Diyas def. (Serbia) Aleksandra Krunić, 6–4, 6–4

=== Doubles ===
- (Poland) Magdalena Fręch / (Belgium) An-Sophie Mestach def. (Chinese Taipei) Chang Kai-chen / (New Zealand) Marina Erakovic, 6–4, 7–6^{(7–5)}
