= 2018 Fuzion 100 Manchester Trophy – Singles =

Singles
- 2018 Fuzion 100 Manchester Trophy

Final
- Champion: (Tunisia) Ons Jabeur
- Runner-up: (Spain) Sara Sorribes Tormo
- Score: 6–2, 6–1

Events
Singles	Doubles
← 2017 ·	Manchester Trophy	· 2019 →

Zarina Diyas was the defending champion, but chose to participate in Nottingham instead.

Ons Jabeur won the title, defeating Sara Sorribes Tormo in the final, 6–2, 6–1.

== Seeds ==
1. (United States) Jennifer Brady (first round)
2. (Thailand) Luksika Kumkhum (second round)
3. (Switzerland) Viktorija Golubic (quarterfinals)
4. (United States) Nicole Gibbs (second round)
5. (Spain) Sara Sorribes Tormo (final)
6. (Russia) Evgeniya Rodina (semifinals)
7. (United Kingdom) Naomi Broady (first round)
8. (Italy) Jasmine Paolini (first round)

== Draw ==
=== Key ===
- Q = Qualifier
- WC = Wild card
- LL = Lucky loser
- Alt = Alternate
- SE = Special exempt
- PR = Protected ranking
- ITF = ITF entry
- JE = Junior exempt
- w/o = Walkover
- r = Retired
- d = Defaulted
- SR = Special ranking

=== Finals ===
Semifinals
6	(Russia) Evgeniya Rodina	2	4
(Tunisia) Ons Jabeur	6	6
5	(Spain) Sara Sorribes Tormo	7^{7}	6
(Belgium) Ysaline Bonaventure	6^{4}	1

Final
(Tunisia) Ons Jabeur	6	6
5	(Spain) Sara Sorribes Tormo	2	1

=== Top half ===
First round
1	(United States) J Brady	1	6	3
(Russia) V Diatchenko	6	3	6
(Czech Republic) M Bouzková	7^{9}	6
WC	(United Kingdom) E Appleton	6^{7}	1
(Ukraine) D Yastremska	6^{5}	4
(United States) C Liu	7^{7}	6
(Belgium) M Zanevska	1	3
6	(Russia) E Rodina	6	6
3	(Switzerland) V Golubic	6	6
(Bulgaria) E Kostova	3	4
(Czech Republic) T Smitková	2	5
Q	(United States) M Sanchez	6	7
WC	(United Kingdom) SB Grey	6	7^{7}
Q	(United Kingdom) E Richardson	3	6^{4}
(Tunisia) O Jabeur	7^{7}	6
7	(United Kingdom) N Broady	6^{5}	1

Second round
(Russia) V Diatchenko	2	4
(Czech Republic) M Bouzková	6	6
(United States) C Liu	3	1
6	(Russia) E Rodina	6	6
3	(Switzerland) V Golubic	6	6
Q	(United States) M Sanchez	2	3
WC	(United Kingdom) SB Grey	4	2
(Tunisia) O Jabeur	6	6

Quarterfinals
(Czech Republic) M Bouzková	4	6	0
6	(Russia) E Rodina	6	4	6
3	(Switzerland) V Golubic	2	3
(Tunisia) O Jabeur	6	6

Semifinals
6	(Russia) E Rodina	2	4
(Tunisia) O Jabeur	6	6

=== Bottom half ===
First round
5	(Spain) S Sorribes Tormo	6	6
Q	(Australia) K Birrell	2	4
Q	(Georgia (country)) M Bolkvadze	6	6
(United States) J Loeb	3	1
(Canada) C Zhao	4	1
(Japan) M Hibi	6	6
(United Kingdom) K Dunne	6	5	5
4	(United States) N Gibbs	3	7	7
8	(Italy) J Paolini	6^{6}	0
(Czech Republic) K Muchová	7^{8}	6
(Romania) A Cadanțu	2	3
(Belgium) Y Bonaventure	6	6
WC	(United Kingdom) E Raducanu	3	6	1
(United Kingdom) H Dart	6	3	6
WC	(United Kingdom) S Murray	1	3
2	(Thailand) L Kumkhum	6	6

Second round
5	(Spain) S Sorribes Tormo	6	7
Q	(Georgia (country)) M Bolkvadze	2	5
(Japan) M Hibi	3	6	6
4	(United States) N Gibbs	6	0	0
(Czech Republic) K Muchová	6	5	3
(Belgium) Y Bonaventure	2	7	6
(United Kingdom) H Dart	3	6	6
2	(Thailand) L Kumkhum	6	2	1

Quarterfinals
5	(Spain) S Sorribes Tormo	5	6	6
(Japan) M Hibi	7	2	0
(Belgium) Y Bonaventure	6	6
(United Kingdom) H Dart	4	3

Semifinals
5	(Spain) S Sorribes Tormo	7^{7}	6
(Belgium) Y Bonaventure	6^{4}	1
