= 2019 Manchester Trophy =

- Date: 10–16 June 2019
- Edition: 3rd
- Category: ITF Women's World Tennis Tour
- Prize money: $100,000
- Surface: Grass
- Location: Manchester, United Kingdom

Champions

Singles
- (Poland) Magda Linette

Doubles
- (China) Duan Yingying / (China) Zhu Lin
← 2018 ·	Manchester Trophy	· 2020 →

The 2019 Manchester Trophy was a professional tennis tournament played on outdoor grass courts. It was the third edition of the women's tournament which was part of the 2019 ITF Women's World Tennis Tour. It took place in Manchester, United Kingdom between 10 and 16 June 2019.

== Singles main-draw entrants ==
=== Seeds ===
Country	Player	Rank^{1}	Seed
POL	Magda Linette	87	1
USA	Madison Brengle	91	2
KAZ	Zarina Diyas	99	3
CHN	Zhu Lin	106	4
JPN	Misaki Doi	108	5
RUS	Anna Blinkova	117	6
CZE	Marie Bouzková	118	7
USA	Whitney Osuigwe	119	8

- ^{1} Rankings are as of 27 May 2019.

=== Other entrants ===
The following players received wildcards into the singles main draw:

- (United Kingdom) Alicia Barnett
- (United Kingdom) Naomi Broady
- (United Kingdom) Gabriella Taylor
- (United Kingdom) Emily Webley-Smith

The following players received entry from the qualifying draw:

- (Germany) Vivian Heisen
- (Japan) Mayo Hibi
- (Australia) Maddison Inglis
- (Japan) Yuriko Lily Miyazaki
- (United Kingdom) Samantha Murray
- (United States) Ingrid Neel

== Champions ==
=== Singles ===
- (Poland) Magda Linette def. (Kazakhstan) Zarina Diyas, 7–6^{(7–1)}, 2–6, 6–3

=== Doubles ===
- (China) Duan Yingying / (China) Zhu Lin def. (United States) Robin Anderson / (Romania) Laura Ioana Paar, 6–4, 6–3
