= Valentin Dimov =

Bulgarian tennis player (born 1989)

Valentin Dimov Валентин Димов
- Country (sports): Bulgaria
- Residence: Sofia, Bulgaria
- Born: 12 March 1989 (age 36) Sofia, Bulgaria
- Turned pro: 2006
- Retired: 2014
- Plays: Right-handed
- Prize money: US$ 24,575

Singles
- Career record: 0–2 (at ATP Tour level, Grand Slam level, and in Davis Cup)
- Career titles: 0; 0 Challengers, 1 Futures
- Highest ranking: 621 (8 March 2010)

Doubles
- Career record: 0–1 (at ATP Tour level, Grand Slam level, and in Davis Cup)
- Career titles: 0; 0 Challengers, 0 Futures
- Highest ranking: 694 (24 August 2009)
- Last updated on: 30 January 2021.

Valentin Ivanov Dimov (Bulgarian: Валентин Иванов Димов, born 12 March 1989) is a former professional Bulgarian tennis player. On 8 March 2010, he reached his highest ATP singles ranking of 621 whilst his best doubles ranking was 694 on 24 August 2009. He is the current captain of the Bulgarian Davis Cup team since 2022.

== Year-end rankings ==
Year	2007	2008	2009	2010	2011	2012	2013	2014
Singles	1386	979	658	905	1011	958	758	1281
Doubles	1175	891	1114	1452	1596	1332	1023	-

== Challenger and Futures Finals ==
=== Singles: 1 (1–0) ===
Legend (singles) ATP Challenger Tour (0–0) ITF Futures (1–0)	Titles by surface Hard (0–0) Clay (1–0) Grass (0–0) Carpet (0–0)

Result	W–L	Date	Tournament	Tier	Surface	Opponent	Score
Win	1–0	May 2009	Bulgaria F4, Yambol	Futures	Clay	(Romania) Cătălin-Ionuț Gârd	6–4, 6–4

=== Doubles: 7 (0–7) ===
Legend (doubles) ATP Challenger Tour (0–0) ITF Futures (0–7)	Titles by surface Hard (0–1) Clay (0–6) Grass (0–0) Carpet (0–0)

Result	W–L	Date	Tournament	Tier	Surface	Partner	Opponents	Score
Loss	0–1	Aug 2007	Bulgaria F5, Varna	Futures	Clay	(Bulgaria) Tihomir Grozdanov	(Romania) Bogdan Leonte (Germany) Peter Torebko	6–7^{(4–7)}, 4–6
Loss	0–2	Aug 2008	Bulgaria F5, Dobrich	Futures	Clay	(Bulgaria) Todor Enev	(Bulgaria) Tihomir Grozdanov (Bulgaria) Simeon Ivanov	6–2, 5–7, [6–10]
Loss	0–3	Aug 2008	Bulgaria F6, Bourgas	Futures	Clay	(Bulgaria) Todor Enev	(Ukraine) Gleb Alekseenko (Ukraine) Vadim Alekseenko	1–6, 5–7
Loss	0–4	Sep 2008	Bulgaria F7, Sliven	Futures	Clay	(Bulgaria) Todor Enev	(Ukraine) Gleb Alekseenko (Ukraine) Vadim Alekseenko	5–7, 5–7
Loss	0–5	May 2009	Bulgaria F1, Sandanski	Futures	Clay	(Bulgaria) Todor Enev	(Denmark) Thomas Kromann (Australia) John Millman	6–3, 1–6, [5–10]
Loss	0–6	May 2012	Bulgaria F1, Varna	Futures	Clay	(Bulgaria) Dimitar Kuzmanov	(Ukraine) Aleksandr Nedovyesov (Ukraine) Ivan Sergeyev	1–6, 1–6
Loss	0–7	Sep 2013	Greece F10, Filippiada	Futures	Hard	(Bulgaria) Dinko Halachev	(Greece) Alexandros Jakupovic (Greece) Markos Kalovelonis	3–6, 3–6

== Davis Cup ==
Valentin Dimov debuted for the Bulgaria Davis Cup team in 2009. Since then he has 5 nominations with 3 ties played, his singles W/L record is 0–2 and doubles W/L record is 0–1 (0–3 overall).

=== Singles (0–2) ===
Edition	Round	Date	Surface	Opponent	W/L	Result
2009 Europe/Africa Zone Group II	QF	12 July 2009	Clay	(Latvia) Andis Juška	L	4–6, 4–6
2010 Europe/Africa Zone Group II	QF	11 July 2010	Clay	(Slovenia) Blaž Rola	L	0–6, 1–6

=== Doubles (0–1) ===
Edition	Round	Date	Partner	Surface	Opponents	W/L	Result
2011 Europe/Africa Zone Group II	R1	5 March 2011	(Bulgaria) Dimitar Kuzmanov	Hard (I)	(Belarus) Uladzimir Ignatik (Belarus) Max Mirnyi	L	2–6, 4–6, 4–6
