= 2017 Aegon Manchester Trophy – Doubles =

Doubles
- 2017 Aegon Manchester Trophy

Final
- Champion: (Poland) Magdalena Fręch (Belgium) An-Sophie Mestach
- Runner-up: (Chinese Taipei) Chang Kai-chen (New Zealand) Marina Erakovic
- Score: 6–4, 7–6^{(7–5)}

Events
Singles	Doubles
Aegon Manchester Trophy	· 2018 →

This was the first edition of the women's doubles event of the Aegon Manchester Trophy.

Magdalena Fręch and An-Sophie Mestach won the title, defeating Chang Kai-chen and Marina Erakovic in the final, 6–4, 7–6^{(7–5)}.

== Seeds ==
1. (United Kingdom) Naomi Broady / (United States) Maria Sanchez (first round)
2. (Netherlands) Lesley Kerkhove / (Serbia) Aleksandra Krunić (first round)
3. (Argentina) María Irigoyen / (Poland) Paula Kania (first round)
4. (Japan) Akiko Omae / (Belgium) Maryna Zanevska (quarterfinals; withdrew)

== Draw ==
=== Key ===
- Q = Qualifier
- WC = Wild card
- LL = Lucky loser
- Alt = Alternate
- ITF = ITF entry
- PR = Protected ranking
- SR = Special ranking
- SE = Special exempt
- JE = Junior exempt
- JR = Junior Accelerator Programme entrant
- CO = College Accelerator Programme entrant
- NG = Next Gen Accelerator Program entrant
- w/o = Walkover
- r = Retired
- d = Defaulted

First round
1	(United Kingdom) N Broady (United States) M Sanchez	6	6^{4}	[8]
(United Kingdom) H Dart (United Kingdom) K Dunne	2	7^{7}	[10]
(Russia) A Blinkova (Russia) A Kudryavtseva	6	6^{5}	[7]
(Chinese Taipei) K-c Chang (New Zealand) M Erakovic	4	7^{7}	[10]
4	(Japan) A Omae (Belgium) M Zanevska	6	4	[10]
(India) A Raina (United Kingdom) E Webley-Smith	4	6	[5]
(Canada) B Andreescu (United States) K Day	1	1
(Australia) Ar Rodionova (Russia) V Savinykh	6	6
WC	(United Kingdom) A Pitak (United Kingdom) K Pitak	1	3
(United States) D Lao (United Kingdom) S Murray	6	6
WC	(United Kingdom) K Boulter (United Kingdom) K Swan	6	6
3	(Argentina) M Irigoyen (Poland) P Kania	1	2
WC	(United Kingdom) SB Grey (United Kingdom) O Nicholls	6	2	[3]
(Australia) N Bains (Germany) V Heisen	4	6	[10]
(Poland) M Fręch (Belgium) A-S Mestach	4	6	[10]
2	(Netherlands) L Kerkhove (Serbia) A Krunić	6	3	[4]

Quarterfinals
(United Kingdom) H Dart (United Kingdom) K Dunne	4	6	[9]
(Chinese Taipei) K-c Chang (New Zealand) M Erakovic	6	4	[11]
4	(Japan) A Omae (Belgium) M Zanevska
(Australia) Ar Rodionova (Russia) V Savinykh	w/o
(United States) D Lao (United Kingdom) S Murray	6	5	[3]
WC	(United Kingdom) K Boulter (United Kingdom) K Swan	2	7	[10]
(Australia) N Bains (Germany) V Heisen	3	4
(Poland) M Fręch (Belgium) A-S Mestach	6	6

Semifinals
(Chinese Taipei) K-c Chang (New Zealand) M Erakovic	6	6
(Australia) Ar Rodionova (Russia) V Savinykh	3	2
WC	(United Kingdom) K Boulter (United Kingdom) K Swan
(Poland) M Fręch (Belgium) A-S Mestach	w/o

Final
(Chinese Taipei) K-c Chang (New Zealand) M Erakovic	4	6^{5}
(Poland) M Fręch (Belgium) A-S Mestach	6	7^{7}
