= 2018 Fuzion 100 Manchester Trophy – Doubles =

Doubles
- 2018 Fuzion 100 Manchester Trophy

Final
- Champions: (Thailand) Luksika Kumkhum (India) Prarthana Thombare
- Runners-up: (United Kingdom) Naomi Broady (United States) Asia Muhammad
- Score: 7–6^{(7–5)}, 6–3

Events
Singles	Doubles
← 2017 ·	Manchester Trophy	· 2019 →

Magdalena Fręch and An-Sophie Mestach were the defending champions, however Fręch chose to participate in the Nottingham Open instead. Mestach partnered alongside Jamie Loeb, but lost in the semifinals to Naomi Broady and Asia Muhammad.

Luksika Kumkhum and Prarthana Thombare won the title, defeating Broady and Muhammad in the final, 7–6^{(7–5)}, 6–3.

== Seeds ==
1. (United Kingdom) Naomi Broady / (United States) Asia Muhammad (final)
2. (Belgium) Ysaline Bonaventure / (Spain) Sara Sorribes Tormo (first round)
3. (United States) Jamie Loeb / (Belgium) An-Sophie Mestach (semifinals)
4. (Thailand) Luksika Kumkhum / (India) Prarthana Thombare (champions)

== Draw ==
=== Key ===
- Q = Qualifier
- WC = Wild card
- LL = Lucky loser
- Alt = Alternate
- ITF = ITF entry
- PR = Protected ranking
- SR = Special ranking
- SE = Special exempt
- JE = Junior exempt
- JR = Junior Accelerator Programme entrant
- CO = College Accelerator Programme entrant
- NG = Next Gen Accelerator Program entrant
- w/o = Walkover
- r = Retired
- d = Defaulted

=== Draw ===
First round
1	(United Kingdom) N Broady (United States) A Muhammad	6	6
(United Kingdom) T Moore (Switzerland) C Perrin	3	3
(United Kingdom) E Webley-Smith (Belgium) M Zanevska	3	6	[9]
(United States) S Chang (United States) A Mueller	6	1	[11]
3	(United States) J Loeb (Belgium) A-S Mestach	6	6
(United Kingdom) A Barnett (United Kingdom) L Sainsbury	1	0
(Australia) N Bains (Papua New Guinea) A Tere-Apisah	1	4
(United Kingdom) SB Grey (United Kingdom) O Nicholls	6	6
(Russia) E Rodina (Ukraine) D Yastremska	6	7
(United States) E Bektas (United States) M Sanchez	4	5
(Romania) A Cadanțu (Bulgaria) E Kostova	6	3	[7]
4	(Thailand) L Kumkhum (India) P Thombare	4	6	[10]
(United Kingdom) E Appleton (United Kingdom) S Murray	6	4	[3]
(United States) I Neel (India) A Raina	3	6	[10]
(United Kingdom) H Dart (United Kingdom) K Dunne	6	6
2	(Belgium) Y Bonaventure (Spain) S Sorribes Tormo	2	4

Quarterfinals
1	(United Kingdom) N Broady (United States) A Muhammad	6	3	[10]
(United States) S Chang (United States) A Mueller	4	6	[7]
3	(United States) J Loeb (Belgium) A-S Mestach	6	3	[10]
(United Kingdom) SB Grey (United Kingdom) O Nicholls	4	6	[8]
(Russia) E Rodina (Ukraine) D Yastremska	5	6	[11]
4	(Thailand) L Kumkhum (India) P Thombare	7	4	[13]
(United States) I Neel (India) A Raina	2	3
(United Kingdom) H Dart (United Kingdom) K Dunne	6	6

Semifinals
1	(United Kingdom) N Broady (United States) A Muhammad	7	5	[10]
3	(United States) J Loeb (Belgium) A-S Mestach	5	7	[8]
4	(Thailand) L Kumkhum (India) P Thombare	5	6	[15]
(United Kingdom) H Dart (United Kingdom) K Dunne	7	3	[13]

Final
1	(United Kingdom) N Broady (United States) A Muhammad	6^{5}	3
4	(Thailand) L Kumkhum (India) P Thombare	7^{7}	6
