= 2016 Aegon Manchester Trophy =

- Date: 30 May – 5 June
- Edition: 2nd
- Draw: 32S / 16D
- Prize money: €42,500
- Surface: Grass
- Location: Manchester, United Kingdom

Champions

Singles
- (Germany) Dustin Brown

Doubles
- (India) Purav Raja / (India) Divij Sharan
← 2015 ·	Aegon Manchester Trophy	· 2017 →

The 2016 Aegon Manchester Trophy was a professional tennis tournament played on grass courts. It was the 2nd edition of the revived tournament, forming part of the 2016 ATP Challenger Tour. It took place in Manchester, United Kingdom between 29 May and 5 June 2016.

== Singles main-draw entrants ==
=== Seeds ===
Country	Player	Rank^{1}	Seed
USA	Denis Kudla	53	1
USA	Rajeev Ram	70	2
GBR	Daniel Evans	91	3
TPE	Lu Yen-hsun	95	4
GER	Benjamin Becker	96	5
UKR	Sergiy Stakhovsky	97	6
AUS	Sam Groth	100	7
USA	~~Bjorn Fratangelo~~	~~103~~	~~8~~

- ^{1} Rankings are as of May 23, 2016.

=== Other entrants ===
The following players received wildcards into the singles main draw:

- (United Kingdom) Liam Broady
- (United Kingdom) Lloyd Glasspool
- (United Kingdom) Brydan Klein
- (United Kingdom) Alexander Ward

The following players entered as alternates:

- (Australia) James Duckworth
- (Spain) Adrián Menéndez Maceiras
- (Germany) Mischa Zverev

The following players received entry from the qualifying draw:

- (Switzerland) Adrien Bossel
- (United Kingdom) Edward Corrie
- (Australia) Marinko Matosevic
- (Australia) Matt Reid

The following player received entry as a lucky loser:

- (China) Li Zhe

== Champions ==
=== Singles ===
- (Germany) Dustin Brown def. (Chinese Taipei) Lu Yen-hsun, 7–6^{(7–5)}, 6–1

=== Doubles ===
- (India) Purav Raja / (India) Divij Sharan def. (United Kingdom) Ken Skupski / (United Kingdom) Neal Skupski, 6–3, 3–6, [11–9]
