= 2009 Manchester Trophy – Doubles =

Doubles
- 2009 Manchester Trophy

Final
- Champions: (United Kingdom) Joshua Goodall (United Kingdom) Jonathan Marray
- Runners-up: (United Kingdom) Colin Fleming (United Kingdom) Ken Skupski
- Score: 6–7(1), 6–3, [11–9]

Events
Singles	Doubles
← 2008 ·	Manchester Trophy	· 2010 →

Adam Feeney and Robert Smeets were the defending champions in the 2009 Manchester Trophy. Feeney chose to not participate and Smeets played with Brydan Klein. They were eliminated by Prakash Amritraj and Dustin Brown in the first round.
Joshua Goodall and Jonathan Marray won the final 6–7(1), 6–3, [11–9], against Colin Fleming and Ken Skupski.

== Seeds ==
1. (Ukraine) ~~Sergei Bubka~~ / (Ukraine) ~~Sergiy Stakhovsky~~ (first round, withdrew)
2. (United Kingdom) Colin Fleming / (United Kingdom) Ken Skupski (final)
3. (Switzerland) George Bastl / (France) Nicolas Mahut (quarterfinals)
4. (United Kingdom) Joshua Goodall / (United Kingdom) Jonathan Marray (champions)

== Draw ==
=== Key ===
- Q = Qualifier
- WC = Wild card
- LL = Lucky loser
- Alt = Alternate
- ITF = ITF entry
- PR = Protected ranking
- SR = Special ranking
- SE = Special exempt
- JE = Junior exempt
- JR = Junior Accelerator Programme entrant
- CO = College Accelerator Programme entrant
- NG = Next Gen Accelerator Program entrant
- w/o = Walkover
- r = Retired
- d = Defaulted

=== Draw ===
First round
1	(Ukraine) S Bubka (Ukraine) S Stakhovsky	w/o
(Austria) M Fischer (Denmark) F Nielsen
WC	(United Kingdom) D Evans (United Kingdom) D Smethurst	6	5	[17]
(Netherlands) M Koning (Netherlands) I Sijsling	3	7	[15]
4	(United Kingdom) J Goodall (United Kingdom) J Marray	6	6
(Netherlands) P Moggre (United Kingdom) N Skupski	3	4
(Australia) B Klein (Australia) R Smeets	2	7	[4]
(India) P Amritraj (Jamaica) D Brown	6	5	[10]
(South Africa) A Anderson (United Kingdom) C Eaton	6	3	[3]
(Canada) P-L Duclos (Slovakia) L Lacko	3	6	[10]
(Australia) K Hensel (Australia) A Hubble	4	2
3	(Switzerland) G Bastl (France) N Mahut	6	6
Q	(France) J-N Insausti (France) A Renard	2	6	[7]
(France) O Charroin (India) P Raja	6	1	[10]
(Slovakia) K Beck (Czech Republic) P Šnobel	3	6	[5]
2	(United Kingdom) C Fleming (United Kingdom) K Skupski	6	1	[10]

Quarterfinals
(Austria) M Fischer (Denmark) F Nielsen	6^{4}	6	[10]
WC	(United Kingdom) D Evans (United Kingdom) D Smethurst	7	1	[5]
4	(United Kingdom) J Goodall (United Kingdom) J Marray	6	7
(India) P Amritraj (Jamaica) D Brown	3	5
(Canada) P-L Duclos (Slovakia) L Lacko	6	6
3	(Switzerland) G Bastl (France) N Mahut	2	4
(France) O Charroin (India) P Raja	3	7	[6]
2	(United Kingdom) C Fleming (United Kingdom) K Skupski	6	6^{3}	[10]

Semifinals
(Austria) M Fischer (Denmark) F Nielsen	5	4
4	(United Kingdom) J Goodall (United Kingdom) J Marray	7	6
(Canada) P-L Duclos (Slovakia) L Lacko	6^{2}	2
2	(United Kingdom) C Fleming (United Kingdom) K Skupski	7	6

Finals
4	(United Kingdom) J Goodall (United Kingdom) J Marray	6^{1}	6	[11]
2	(United Kingdom) C Fleming (United Kingdom) K Skupski	7	3	[9]
