= 2018 Fuzion 100 Manchester Trophy =

- Date: 11–17 June
- Edition: 2nd
- Category: ITF Women's Circuit
- Prize money: $100,000
- Surface: Grass
- Location: Manchester, United Kingdom

Champions

Singles
- (Tunisia) Ons Jabeur

Doubles
- (Thailand) Luksika Kumkhum / (India) Prarthana Thombare
← 2017 ·	Manchester Trophy	· 2019 →

The 2018 Fuzion 100 Manchester Trophy was a professional tennis tournament played on outdoor grass courts. It was the second edition of the tournament and was part of the 2018 ITF Women's Circuit. It took place in Manchester, United Kingdom, on 11–17 June 2018.

== Singles main draw entrants ==
=== Seeds ===
Country	Player	Rank^{1}	Seed
USA	Jennifer Brady	86	1
THA	Luksika Kumkhum	100	2
SUI	Viktorija Golubic	110	3
USA	Nicole Gibbs	113	4
ESP	Sara Sorribes Tormo	114	5
RUS	Evgeniya Rodina	116	6
GBR	Naomi Broady	120	7
ITA	Jasmine Paolini	130	8

- ^{1} Rankings as of 28 May 2018.

=== Other entrants ===
The following players received a wildcard into the singles main draw:

- (United Kingdom) Emily Appleton
- (United Kingdom) Sarah Beth Grey
- (United Kingdom) Samantha Murray
- (United Kingdom) Emma Raducanu

The following players received entry from the qualifying draw:

- (Australia) Kimberly Birrell
- (Georgia (country)) Mariam Bolkvadze
- (United Kingdom) Eden Richardson
- (United States) Maria Sanchez

== Champions ==
=== Singles ===
- (Tunisia) Ons Jabeur def. (Spain) Sara Sorribes Tormo, 6–2, 6–1

=== Doubles ===
- (Thailand) Luksika Kumkhum / (India) Prarthana Thombare def. (United Kingdom) Naomi Broady / (United States) Asia Muhammad, 7–6^{(7–5)}, 6–3
