= 2009 Manchester Trophy =

- Date: July 13 – July 19
- Edition: 15th
- Location: Manchester, England, United Kingdom

Champions

Singles
- (Belgium) Olivier Rochus

Doubles
- (United Kingdom) Joshua Goodall / (United Kingdom) Jonathan Marray
← 2008 ·	Manchester Trophy	· 2010 →

The 2009 Manchester Trophy was a professional tennis tournament played on outdoor red clay courts. It was the fifteenth edition of the tournament which was part of the 2009 ATP Challenger Tour. It took place in Manchester, England, United Kingdom between 11 and 19 July 2009.

== Singles entrants ==
=== Seeds ===
Nationality	Player	Ranking*	Seeding
UKR	Sergiy Stakhovsky	87	1
BEL	Olivier Rochus	120	2
SVK	Karol Beck	125	3
FRA	Nicolas Mahut	146	4
IND	Prakash Amritraj	159	5
TUR	Marsel İlhan	184	6
SVK	Lukáš Lacko	185	7
AUS	Brydan Klein	186	8

- Rankings are as of July 6, 2009.

=== Other entrants ===
The following players received wildcards into the singles main draw:

- (United Kingdom) Daniel Cox
- (United Kingdom) Colin Fleming
- (United Kingdom) Ashley Hewitt
- (United Kingdom) Daniel Smethurst

The following players received entry from the qualifying draw:

- (South Africa) Andrew Anderson
- (France) Olivier Charroin
- (United Kingdom) Jonathan Marray
- (Netherlands) Igor Sijsling

== Champions ==
=== Singles ===
(Belgium) Olivier Rochus def. (Netherlands) Igor Sijsling, 6–3, 4–6, 6–2

=== Doubles ===
(United Kingdom) Joshua Goodall / (United Kingdom) Jonathan Marray def. (United Kingdom) Colin Fleming / (United Kingdom) Ken Skupski, 6–7(1), 6–3, [11–9]
