= 2011 Davis Cup Europe/Africa Zone Group II =

International tennis competition

The European and African Zone is one of the three zones of regional Davis Cup competition in 2011.

In the European and African Zone there are four different groups in which teams compete against each other to advance to the next group.

== Participating teams ==
=== Seeds ===
1. Great Britain
2. Latvia
3. Belarus
4. Lithuania
5. Cyprus
6. Bosnia and Herzegovina
7. Monaco
8. Ireland

=== Remaining Nations ===
- Bulgaria
- Denmark
- Estonia
- Greece
- Hungary
- Luxembourg
- Morocco
- Tunisia

== Draw ==
Play-offs
Dublin, Ireland (indoor hard)
Tunisia | 2
8 | Ireland | 3
Sofia, Bulgaria (indoor hard)
Bulgaria | 2
5 | Cyprus | 3
Vilnius, Lithuania (clay)
Morocco | 5
4 | Lithuania | 0
Thessaloniki, Greece (clay)
7 | Monaco | 3
Greece | 2

First round
Bolton, Great Britain (indoor hard)
1 | Great Britain | 4
Tunisia | 1
Dublin, Ireland (indoor hard)
8 | Ireland | 2
Luxembourg | 3
Minsk, Belarus (indoor hard)
3 | Belarus | 4
Bulgaria | 1
Nicosia, Cyprus (hard)
5 | Cyprus | 0
Hungary | 5
Marrakesh, Morocco (clay)
Morocco | 2
6 | Bosnia and Herzegovina | 3
Tallinn, Estonia (indoor hard)
Estonia | 3
4 | Lithuania | 2
Kolding, Denmark (indoor carpet)
Denmark | 3
7 | Monaco | 2
Thessaloniki, Greece (clay)
Greece | 1
2 | Latvia | 4

Second round
Glasgow, Great Britain (indoor hard)
1 | Great Britain | 4
Luxembourg | 1
Gödöllő, Hungary (clay)
3 | Belarus | 2
Hungary | 3
Tuzla, Bosnia and Herz. (indoor hard)
6 | Bosnia and Herzegovina | 3
Estonia | 2
Frederiksberg, Denmark (clay)
Denmark | 3
2 | Latvia | 2

Third round
Glasgow, Great Britain (indoor hard)
1 | Great Britain | 5
Hungary | 0
Hillerød, Denmark (indoor hard)
6 | Bosnia and Herzegovina | 2
Denmark | 3

- Tunisia, Bulgaria, Lithuania, and Greece relegated to Group III in 2012.
- Great Britain and Denmark promoted to Group I in 2012.

== First round matches ==
=== Great Britain vs. Tunisia ===
Great Britain
4
Bolton Arena, Bolton, Great Britain
4–6 March 2011
hard (indoors)

Tunisia
1

| | | | 1 | 2 | 3 | 4 | 5 |
|---|---|---|---|---|---|---|---|
| 1 | (United Kingdom) (Tunisia) | Jamie Baker; Malek Jaziri | 6; 4 | 3; 6 | 5; 7 | 2; 6 |
| 2 | (United Kingdom) (Tunisia) | James Ward; Sami Ghorbel | 6; 0 | 6; 2 | 6; 0 |
| 3 | (United Kingdom) (Tunisia) | Colin Fleming / Jamie Murray; Slim Hamza / Malek Jaziri | 6; 1 | 3; 6 | 6; 3 | 6; 4 |
| 4 | (United Kingdom) (Tunisia) | James Ward; Malek Jaziri | 3; 6 | 6; 3 | 3; 6 | 6; 3 | 8; 6 |
| 5 | (United Kingdom) (Tunisia) | Jamie Baker; Slim Hamza | 6; 1 | 6; 4 |

=== Ireland vs. Luxembourg ===
Ireland
2
Fitzwilliam Lawn Tennis Club, Dublin, Ireland
4–6 March 2011
hard (indoors)

Luxembourg
3

| | | | 1 | 2 | 3 | 4 | 5 |
|---|---|---|---|---|---|---|---|
| 1 | (Republic of Ireland) (Luxembourg) | Conor Niland; Mike Vermeer | 6; 1 | 6; 0 | 6; 2 |
| 2 | (Republic of Ireland) (Luxembourg) | Barry King; Gilles Müller | 6; 4 | 1; 6 | 3; 6 | 3; 6 |
| 3 | (Republic of Ireland) (Luxembourg) | James Cluskey / Barry King; Laurent Bram / Gilles Müller | 6^{4} 7^{7} | 6^{4} 7^{7} | 4; 6 |
| 4 | (Republic of Ireland) (Luxembourg) | Conor Niland; Gilles Müller | 4; 6 | 4; 6 | 4; 6 |
| 5 | (Republic of Ireland) (Luxembourg) | James McGee; Mike Vermeer | 6; 1 | 6; 2 |

=== Belarus vs. Bulgaria ===
Belarus
4
Republic Olympic Training Center for Tennis, Minsk, Belarus
4–6 March 2011
hard (indoors)

Bulgaria
1

| | | | 1 | 2 | 3 | 4 | 5 |
|---|---|---|---|---|---|---|---|
| 1 | (Belarus) (Bulgaria) | Uladzimir Ignatik; Todor Enev | 6; 2 | 3; 6 | 6^{4} 7^{7} | 6; 2 | 6; 2 |
| 2 | (Belarus) (Bulgaria) | Siarhei Betau; Dimitar Kutrovsky | 5; 7 | 4; 6 | 6; 2 | 6^{2} 7^{7} |
| 3 | (Belarus) (Bulgaria) | Uladzimir Ignatik / Max Mirnyi; Valentin Dimov / Dimitar Kuzmanov | 6; 2 | 6; 4 | 6; 4 |
| 4 | (Belarus) (Bulgaria) | Uladzimir Ignatik; Dimitar Kutrovsky | 3; 6 | 6; 2 | 6; 1 | 6; 4 |
| 5 | (Belarus) (Bulgaria) | Aliaksandr Bury; Dimitar Kuzmanov | 6; 2 | 6; 3 |

=== Cyprus vs. Hungary ===
Cyprus
0
National Tennis Centre, Nicosia, Cyprus
4–6 March 2011
hard

Hungary
5

| | | | 1 | 2 | 3 | 4 | 5 |
|---|---|---|---|---|---|---|---|
| 1 | (Cyprus) (Hungary) | Rareş Cuzdriorean; Ádám Kellner | 4; 6 | 4; 6 | 3; 6 |
| 2 | (Cyprus) (Hungary) | Philippos Tsangaridis; Attila Balázs | 1; 6 | 2; 6 | 2; 6 |
| 3 | (Cyprus) (Hungary) | Rareş Cuzdriorean / Christopher Koutrouzas; Attila Balázs / Kornél Bardóczky | 1; 6 | 4; 6 | 3; 6 |
| 4 | (Cyprus) (Hungary) | Sergis Kyratzis; Attila Balázs | 4; 6 | 6^{6} 7^{8} |
| 5 | (Cyprus) (Hungary) | Philippos Tsangaridis; Márton Fucsovics | 4; 6 | 3; 6 |

=== Morocco vs. Bosnia and Herzegovina ===
Morocco
2
Royal Tennis Club de Marrakech, Marrakesh, Morocco
4–6 March 2011
clay

Bosnia and Herzegovina
3

| | | | 1 | 2 | 3 | 4 | 5 |
|---|---|---|---|---|---|---|---|
| 1 | (Morocco) (Bosnia and Herzegovina) | Reda El Amrani; Amer Delić | 6; 2 | 7^{7} 6^{4} | 6; 4 |
| 2 | (Morocco) (Bosnia and Herzegovina) | Talal Ouahabi; Aldin Šetkić | 4; 6 | 6; 2 | 7; 5 | 3; 6 | 4; 6 |
| 3 | (Morocco) (Bosnia and Herzegovina) | Reda El Amrani / Talal Ouahabi; Amer Delić / Ismar Gorčić | 3; 6 | 2; 6 | 6; 1 | 4; 6 |
| 4 | (Morocco) (Bosnia and Herzegovina) | Reda El Amrani; Aldin Šetkić | 2; 6 | 6; 2 | 6; 0 | 6; 1 |
| 5 | (Morocco) (Bosnia and Herzegovina) | Talal Ouahabi; Amer Delić | 1; 6 | 3; 6 | 6; 4 | 4; 6 |

=== Estonia vs. Lithuania ===
Estonia
3
Rocca al Mare Tennisekeskus, Tallinn, Estonia

4–6 March 2011
hard (indoors)

Lithuania
2

| | | | 1 | 2 | 3 | 4 | 5 |
|---|---|---|---|---|---|---|---|---|
| 1 | (Estonia) (Lithuania) | Jaak Põldma; Ričardas Berankis | 6^{3} 7^{7} | 2; 6 | 3; 6 |
| 2 | (Estonia) (Lithuania) | Jürgen Zopp; Laurynas Grigelis | 4; 5 | | | | | retired |
| 3 | (Estonia) (Lithuania) | Jürgen Zopp / Mait Künnap; Ričardas Berankis / Dovydas Šakinis | 6; 2 | 6; 3 | 3; 6 | 6; 3 |
| 4 | (Estonia) (Lithuania) | Jürgen Zopp; Ričardas Berankis | 6; 1 | 6; 4 | 4; 6 | 3; 6 | 9; 11 |
| 5 | (Estonia) (Lithuania) | Jaak Põldma; Dovydas Šakinis | 6; 1 | 6; 4 | 1; 6 | 6; 1 |

=== Denmark vs. Monaco ===
Denmark
3
Bramdrupdam Hallerne, Kolding, Denmark
4–6 March 2011
carpet (indoors)

Monaco
2

| | | | 1 | 2 | 3 | 4 | 5 |
|---|---|---|---|---|---|---|---|
| 1 | (Denmark) (Monaco) | Martin Pedersen; Jean-René Lisnard | 6^{3} 7^{7} | 6; 4 | 4; 6 | 6; 2 | 2; 6 |
| 2 | (Denmark) (Monaco) | Frederik Nielsen; Thomas Oger | 7; 5 | 6; 2 | 7; 5 |
| 3 | (Denmark) (Monaco) | Thomas Kromann / Frederik Nielsen; Guillaume Couillard / Jean-René Lisnard | 6; 2 | 6; 3 | 6; 1 |
| 4 | (Denmark) (Monaco) | Frederik Nielsen; Jean-René Lisnard | 6; 3 | 6; 2 | 6; 4 |
| 5 | (Denmark) (Monaco) | Søren Wedege; Benjamin Balleret | 2; 6 | 6^{5} 7^{7} |

=== Greece vs. Latvia ===
Greece
1
Thessaloniki Tennis Club, Thessaloniki, Greece
4–6 March 2011
clay

Latvia
4

| | | | 1 | 2 | 3 | 4 | 5 |
|---|---|---|---|---|---|---|---|
| 1 | (Greece) (Latvia) | Theodoros Angelinos; Andis Juška | 3; 6 | 5; 7 | 2; 6 |
| 2 | (Greece) (Latvia) | Alex Jakupovic; Deniss Pavlovs | 3; 6 | 1; 6 | 1; 6 |
| 3 | (Greece) (Latvia) | Konstantinos Economidis / Alex Jakupovic; Andis Juška / Deniss Pavlovs | 4; 6 | 3; 6 | 3; 6 |
| 4 | (Greece) (Latvia) | Paris Gemouchidis; Deniss Pavlovs | 3; 6 | 4; 6 |
| 5 | (Greece) (Latvia) | Konstantinos Economidis; Miķelis Lībietis | 6; 1 | 6; 2 |

== Second round matches ==
=== Great Britain vs. Luxembourg ===
Great Britain
4
Braehead Arena, Glasgow, Great Britain
8–10 July
hard (indoors)

Luxembourg
1

| | | | 1 | 2 | 3 | 4 | 5 |
|---|---|---|---|---|---|---|---|
| 1 | (United Kingdom) (Luxembourg) | James Ward; Gilles Müller | 3; 6 | 6^{4} 7^{7} | 1; 6 |
| 2 | (United Kingdom) (Luxembourg) | Andy Murray; Laurent Bram | 6; 0 | 6; 0 | 6; 0 |
| 3 | (United Kingdom) (Luxembourg) | Andy Murray / Jamie Murray; Laurent Bram / Mike Vermeer | 7; 5 | 6; 2 | 6; 0 |
| 4 | (United Kingdom) (Luxembourg) | Andy Murray; Gilles Müller | 6; 4 | 6; 3 | 6; 1 |
| 5 | (United Kingdom) (Luxembourg) | James Ward; Mike Vermeer | 6; 1 | 6; 3 |

=== Hungary vs. Belarus ===
Hungary
3
Gödöllő Kiskastély, Gödöllő, Hungary
8–10 July
clay (outdoor)

Belarus
2

| | | | 1 | 2 | 3 | 4 | 5 |
|---|---|---|---|---|---|---|---|
| 1 | (Hungary) (Belarus) | Ádám Kellner; Uladzimir Ignatik | 6^{5} 7^{7} | 4; 6 | 7; 5 | 6; 1 | 5; 7 |
| 2 | (Hungary) (Belarus) | Attila Balázs; Sergey Betov | 6; 2 | 6; 1 | 7; 5 |
| 3 | (Hungary) (Belarus) | Kornél Bardóczky / Márton Fucsovics; Uladzimir Ignatik / Max Mirnyi | 5; 7 | 7^{7} 6^{4} | 7^{7} 6^{2} | 1; 6 | 4; 6 |
| 4 | (Hungary) (Belarus) | Attila Balázs; Uladzimir Ignatik | 7^{7} 6^{5} | 6; 3 | 7^{9} 6^{7} |
| 5 | (Hungary) (Belarus) | Ádám Kellner; Sergey Betov | 6; 2 | 6; 0 | 6; 2 |

=== Bosnia and Herzegovina vs. Estonia ===
Bosnia and Herzegovina
3
SKPC Mejdan, Tuzla, Bosnia and Herzegovina
8–10 July
hard (indoors)

Estonia
2

| | | | 1 | 2 | 3 | 4 | 5 |
|---|---|---|---|---|---|---|---|
| 1 | (Bosnia and Herzegovina) (Estonia) | Aldin Šetkić; Jürgen Zopp | 6; 1 | 5; 7 | 3; 6 | 7; 5 | 2; 6 |
| 2 | (Bosnia and Herzegovina) (Estonia) | Amer Delić; Jaak Põldma | 6; 4 | 6; 1 | 7; 5 |
| 3 | (Bosnia and Herzegovina) (Estonia) | Amer Delić / Ismar Gorčić; Mait Künnap / Jürgen Zopp | 6; 4 | 6; 1 | 6^{1} 7^{7} | 2; 6 | 6; 2 |
| 4 | (Bosnia and Herzegovina) (Estonia) | Amer Delić; Jürgen Zopp | 7^{14} 6^{12} | 6; 3 | 7; 5 |
| 5 | (Bosnia and Herzegovina) (Estonia) | Tomislav Brkić; Vladimir Ivanov | 5; 7 | 6; 3 | 3; 6 |

=== Denmark vs. Latvia ===
Denmark
3
KB Pile Alle, Frederiksberg, Denmark
8–10 July
clay (outdoor)

Latvia
2

| | | | 1 | 2 | 3 | 4 | 5 |
|---|---|---|---|---|---|---|---|
| 1 | (Denmark) (Latvia) | Martin Pedersen; Andis Juška | 2; 6 | 6^{3} 7^{7} | 6; 2 | 2; 6 |
| 2 | (Denmark) (Latvia) | Frederik Nielsen; Martins Podzus | 0; 6 | 1; 6 | 7; 5 | 6; 3 | 6; 0 |
| 3 | (Denmark) (Latvia) | Thomas Kromann / Frederik Nielsen; Andis Juška / Deniss Pavlovs | 6; 1 | 3; 6 | 4; 6 | 6; 4 | 6; 2 |
| 4 | (Denmark) (Latvia) | Frederik Nielsen; Andis Juška | 1; 6 | 6; 4 | 2; 6 | 2; 6 |
| 5 | (Denmark) (Latvia) | Martin Pedersen; Martins Podzus | 6; 2 | 6; 4 | 6; 1 |

== Play-off Games ==
=== Ireland vs. Tunisia ===
Ireland
3
David Lloyd Riverside Lawn Tennis Club, Dublin, Ireland
8–10 July
hard (indoors)

Tunisia
2

| | | | 1 | 2 | 3 | 4 | 5 |
|---|---|---|---|---|---|---|---|
| 1 | (Republic of Ireland) (Tunisia) | Conor Niland; Anis Ghorbel | 6; 4 | 6; 2 | 6; 1 |
| 2 | (Republic of Ireland) (Tunisia) | Barry King; Malek Jaziri | 1; 6 | 1; 6 | 5; 7 |
| 3 | (Republic of Ireland) (Tunisia) | James Cluskey / Conor Niland; Anis Ghorbel / Malek Jaziri | 4; 6 | 6^{4} 7^{7} | 6^{5} 7^{7} |
| 4 | (Republic of Ireland) (Tunisia) | Conor Niland; Malek Jaziri | 7; 5 | 7; 5 | 6; 1 |
| 5 | (Republic of Ireland) (Tunisia) | Barry King; Anis Ghorbel | 7^{9} 6^{7} | 6; 2 | 6; 1 |

=== Bulgaria vs. Cyprus ===
Bulgaria
2
Tennis Hall Sofia, Sofia, Bulgaria
8–10 July
hard (indoors)

Cyprus
3

| | | | 1 | 2 | 3 | 4 | 5 |
|---|---|---|---|---|---|---|---|
| 1 | (Bulgaria) (Cyprus) | Tzvetan Mihov; Marcos Baghdatis | 1; 6 | 4; 6 | 1; 6 |
| 2 | (Bulgaria) (Cyprus) | Dimitar Kutrovsky; Philippos Tsangaridis | 6; 0 | 6; 2 | 6; 2 |
| 3 | (Bulgaria) (Cyprus) | Todor Enev / Dimitar Kutrovsky; Marcos Baghdatis / Rareş Cuzdriorean | 2; 6 | 2; 6 | 6; 3 | 6; 4 | 4; 6 |
| 4 | (Bulgaria) (Cyprus) | Dimitar Kutrovsky; Marcos Baghdatis | 3; 6 | 6; 3 | 6^{3} 7^{7} | 5; 7 |
| 5 | (Bulgaria) (Cyprus) | Dimitar Kuzmanov; Christopher Koutrouzas | 6; 2 | 6; 1 |

=== Lithuania vs. Morocco ===
Lithuania
0
Sereikiskiai Tennis Courts, Vilnius, Lithuania
8–10 July
clay (outdoor)

Morocco
5

| | | | 1 | 2 | 3 | 4 | 5 |
|---|---|---|---|---|---|---|---|---|
| 1 | (Lithuania) (Morocco) | Lukas Mugevičius; Reda El Amrani | 5; 7 | 1; 6 | 1; 6 |
| 2 | (Lithuania) (Morocco) | Dovydas Šakinis; Yassine Idmbarek | 6; 2 | 2; 6 | 3; 6 | 0; 2 | | retired |
| 3 | (Lithuania) (Morocco) | Lukas Mugevičius / Dovydas Šakinis; Anas Fattar / Hicham Khaddari | 4; 6 | 4; 6 | 6; 3 | 2; 6 |
| 4 | (Lithuania) (Morocco) | Julius Tverijonas; Hicham Khaddari | 4; 6 | 3; 6 |
| 5 | (Lithuania) (Morocco) | Julius Gotovskis; Yassine Idmbarek | 6; 1 | 4; 6 | 2; 6 |

=== Greece vs. Monaco ===
Greece
2
Thessaloniki Tennis Club, Thessaloniki, Greece
8–10 July
clay (outdoor)

Monaco
3

| | | | 1 | 2 | 3 | 4 | 5 |
|---|---|---|---|---|---|---|---|
| 1 | (Greece) (Monaco) | Alexandros Jakupovic; Jean-René Lisnard | 2; 6 | 6; 3 | 5; 7 | 5; 7 |
| 2 | (Greece) (Monaco) | Theodoros Angelinos; Benjamin Balleret | 6; 3 | 6^{5} 7^{7} | 4; 6 | 4; 6 |
| 3 | (Greece) (Monaco) | Konstantinos Economidis / Alexandros Jakupovic; Guillaume Couillard / Thomas Oger | 6; 3 | 2; 6 | 6^{5} 7^{7} | 6; 2 | 2; 6 |
| 4 | (Greece) (Monaco) | Konstantinos Economidis; Benjamin Balleret | 6; 3 | 7^{7} 6^{4} |
| 5 | (Greece) (Monaco) | Theodoros Angelinos; Jean-René Lisnard | 7^{7} 6^{3} | 6; 1 |

== Third round matches ==
=== Great Britain vs. Hungary ===
Great Britain
5
Braehead Arena, Glasgow, Great Britain
16–18 September 2011
hard (indoors)

Hungary
0

| | | | 1 | 2 | 3 | 4 | 5 |
|---|---|---|---|---|---|---|---|
| 1 | (United Kingdom) (Hungary) | James Ward; Attila Balázs | 6; 4 | 6; 4 | 4; 6 | 6; 4 |
| 2 | (United Kingdom) (Hungary) | Andy Murray; Sebő Kiss | 6; 0 | 6; 2 | 7^{7} 6^{3} |
| 3 | (United Kingdom) (Hungary) | Colin Fleming / Ross Hutchins; Attila Balázs / Kornél Bardóczky | 6; 3 | 6; 4 | 6; 4 |
| 4 | (United Kingdom) (Hungary) | Andy Murray; György Balázs | 7^{7} 6^{3} | 6; 3 |
| 5 | (United Kingdom) (Hungary) | Colin Fleming; Sebő Kiss | 6; 4 | 6; 3 |

=== Bosnia and Herzegovina vs. Denmark ===
Bosnia and Herzegovina
2
Hillerød Tennisklub, Hillerød, Denmark
16–18 September 2011
hard (indoors)

Denmark
3

| | | | 1 | 2 | 3 | 4 | 5 |
|---|---|---|---|---|---|---|---|
| 1 | (Bosnia and Herzegovina) (Denmark) | Aldin Šetkić; Frederik Nielsen | 4; 6 | 2; 6 | 3; 6 |
| 2 | (Bosnia and Herzegovina) (Denmark) | Amer Delić; Martin Pedersen | 6; 1 | 6^{5} 7^{7} | 7^{7} 6^{1} | 4; 6 | 6; 4 |
| 3 | (Bosnia and Herzegovina) (Denmark) | Amer Delić / Ismar Gorčić; Thomas Kromann / Frederik Nielsen | 6; 3 | 2; 6 | 3; 6 | 6; 3 | 3; 6 |
| 4 | (Bosnia and Herzegovina) (Denmark) | Amer Delić; Frederik Nielsen | 7^{7} 6^{5} | 7; 5 | 6; 3 |
| 5 | (Bosnia and Herzegovina) (Denmark) | Damir Džumhur; Martin Pedersen | 6; 3 | 1; 6 | 4; 6 | 1; 6 |
