= Købstædernes ATP Challenger =

Kobstaedernes ATP Challenger

ATP Challenger Tour
- Location: Kolding, Denmark
- Category: ATP Challenger Series
- Surface: Hard / Indoors
- Draw: 32S/32Q/16D
- Prize money: €42,500
- Website: Official Website

The Kobstaedernes ATP Challenger is a tennis tournament held in Kolding, Denmark since 2005. The event is part of the ATP challenger series and is played on indoor hard courts.

== Past finals ==
=== Singles ===
Year	Champion	Runner-up	Score
2010	Not Held		
2009	(United Kingdom) Alex Bogdanovic	(Croatia) Ivan Dodig	3–6, 7–6(7), def.
2008	(Croatia) Roko Karanušić	(Slovakia) Karol Beck	6–4, 6–4
2007	(Slovakia) Lukáš Lacko	(Luxembourg) Gilles Müller	7–6, 6–4
2006	(France) Michaël Llodra	(Netherlands) Raemon Sluiter	6–4, 6–4
2005	(Russia) Dmitry Tursunov	(Belgium) Steve Darcis	6–3, 6–4

=== Doubles ===
Year	Champion	Runner-up	Score
2010	Not Held		
2009	(Austria) Martin Fischer (Austria) Philipp Oswald	(United Kingdom) Jonathan Marray (Pakistan) Aisam-ul-Haq Qureshi	7–5, 6–3
2008	(United States) Brendan Evans (South Africa) Chris Haggard	(United Kingdom) James Auckland (Australia) Todd Perry	6–3, 7–5
2007	(Denmark) Frederik Nielsen (Denmark) Rasmus Nørby	(Germany) Philipp Petzschner (Austria) Alexander Peya	4–6, 6–3, [10–8]
2006	(South Africa) Jeff Coetzee (Netherlands) Rogier Wassen	(United States) Eric Butorac (United States) Travis Parrott	4–6, 6–4, [10–5]
2005	(Australia) Stephen Huss (Sweden) Johan Landsberg	(Denmark) Frederik Nielsen (Denmark) Rasmus Nørby	1–6, 7–6, [10–8]
