= Alex Bogdanovic =

Serbian-born English tennis player

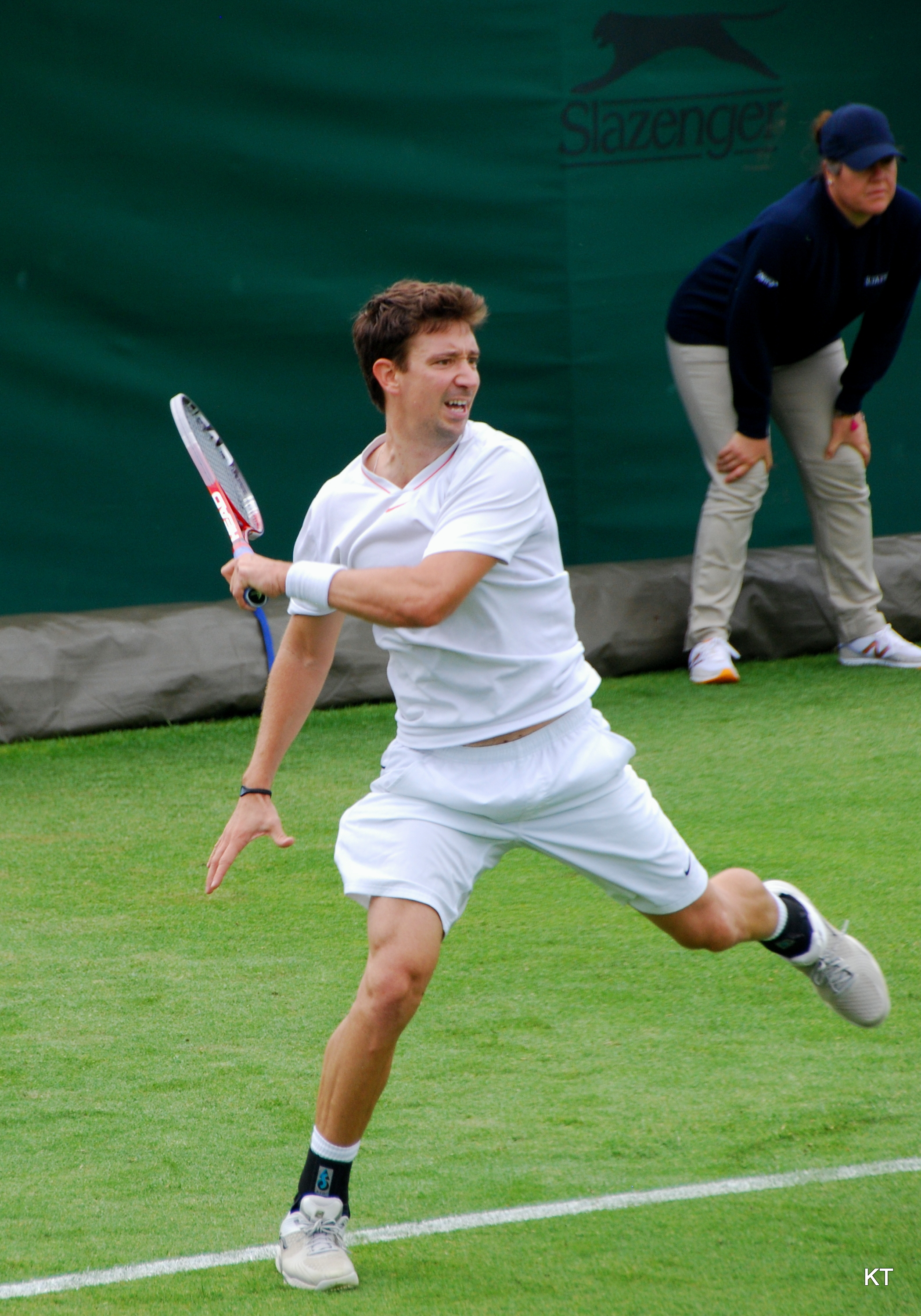
- Bogdanovic at the 2013 Wimbledon qualifying
- Native name: Алекса Богдановић
- Country (sports): (United Kingdom) Great Britain
- Born: 22 May 1984 (age 41) Belgrade, SR Serbia, SFR Yugoslavia
- Height: 1.83 m (6 ft 0 in)
- Turned pro: 2002
- Retired: 15 July 2013
- Plays: Left-handed (one-handed backhand)
- Prize money: $695,395

Singles
- Career record: 11–36 (at ATP Tour and Grand Slam level, and in Davis Cup)
- Career titles: 0
- Highest ranking: No. 108 (25 June 2007)

Grand Slam singles results
- Australian Open: Q2 (2008, 2009)
- French Open: Q2 (2007, 2008, 2009)
- Wimbledon: 1R (2002, 2003, 2004, 2005, 2006, 2007, 2008, 2009)
- US Open: 1R (2004)

Doubles
- Career record: 2–10 (at ATP Tour and Grand Slam level, and in Davis Cup)
- Career titles: 0
- Highest ranking: No. 336 (12 January 2009)

Grand Slam doubles results
- Wimbledon: 2R (2009)

Grand Slam mixed doubles results
- Wimbledon: QF (2007)

Team competitions
- Davis Cup: 1R (2003, 2008)
- Last updated on: 23 May 2025.

Aleksa Bogdanovic (Serbian: Алекса Богдановић, Aleksa Bogdanović; born 22 May 1984) is a retired Serbian-born British tennis player and former British No. 2 in singles. On the professional tour, he won nine Challenger and four Futures titles in singles, but never broke into the top 100 of the ATP rankings.

Bogdanovic competed in 22 Grand Slam singles qualifying tournaments, and qualified for the main draw only once, at the 2004 US Open, where he lost in the first round. He also received a wildcard into the Wimbledon singles main draw for eight consecutive years (from 2002 to 2009), but was eliminated in the first round each time, winning a total of just three sets across those matches.

== Early and personal life ==
Bogdanovic was born in Belgrade to parents Dušan and Emilija, who left Belgrade for the UK in 1992 with their eight-year-old son Alex and daughter Olga. At school, he started playing socially at the urging of a best friend.

He is nicknamed 'Boggo' and 'A-Bog' (Bog means God in Serbian)

== Junior career ==
Started playing regularly on the international junior circuit in 1999. He had a lot of success in juniors for Great Britain, reaching a high of no 8, winning the Uruguay Bowl in Montevideo and reaching the semifinal of the US Junior Open in United States in 2001, the first British player ever to do so. He finished runner-up in the U18 national championships in 2001 to Richard Bloomfield.

== Senior career ==
=== 2001–2002 ===
Finished runner-up in the senior national championships that autumn beating top 100 player Martin Lee and British no 4 Arvind Parmar before losing in the final to Lee Childs in straight sets. In 2002, he was given a wildcard for Wimbledon, being the youngest man in the draw. However, he lost in the first round. His first senior title was won this year, the Futures tournament in Nottingham. That autumn he won the senior national championships, beating Martin Lee again and defeating Jamie Delgado 7–5, 6–2 in the final.

=== 2003: Davis Cup debut ===
Bogdanovic made his debut in the Davis Cup for Great Britain in February 2003 against Australia, playing against the then world number 1, Lleyton Hewitt. Bogdanovic, then ranked at 457 in the world, made a great start on the clay court surface against a surprisingly lacklustre Hewitt and led 5–3 in the first set, but Hewitt then found his form and cruised to victory in straight sets, 7–5, 6–1, 6–2. Bogdanovic beat Todd Woodbridge 6–2, 7–6, in a dead-rubber to prevent a whitewash.

=== 2004: LTA controversy ===
At a Sarajevo challenger event in March 2004, Bogdanovic withdrew from his quarterfinal match, due to food poisoning. The next week, he was scheduled thereafter to play in a futures event in Greece but, for the same reasons, stated he was unable to do so.

In April 2004, the Lawn Tennis Association accused Bogdanovic of having an attitude problem; they withdrew his £80,000 per year funding and LTA coach (Martin Bohn), and stopped his free use of the practice courts at their headquarters at Queen's Club. Bogdanovic also lost his place in Great Britain's Davis Cup squad following just one victory in eight singles rubbers.

Bogdanovic was runner-up in the Bournemouth Futures (to Gael Monfils) in May, and the Nottingham Challenger (to Jo-Wilfried Tsonga) in July, but won the Manchester Challenger in July.

Bogdanovic lost to Roger Federer in the first round at Wimbledon in June, but qualified for the US Open in September and lost to Álex Calatrava in the first round in five sets.

During Wimbledon 2004, the LTA met with Bogdanovic and offered to let him rejoin the LTA training squad. Bogdanovic declined, preferring to work with a coach he had hired himself, initially Mike Raphael, then Paul Hand.

=== 2005 ===
Bogdanovic beat Mark Hilton in the final of the Nottingham Challenger, the last all-British Challenger final until the 2016 RBC Tennis Championships of Dallas, when Kyle Edmund beat Daniel Evans.

=== 2006 ===
The 2006 Grass court season was disappointing, seeing Bogdanovic going out in first rounds of the Surbiton Trophy, Queens and the Nottingham Open ATP tournaments. As well at Wimbledon. He drew strong opponents in all three ATP events. At Queens he took World number 33 Dmitry Tursunov to a tie- break, in Nottingham he took a set off world 52 Max Mirnyi and at Wimbledon he made a credible showing against world number 2 Rafael Nadal. Alex received Wild Card entry into all three.

For the first time in his career, his ranking was high enough for him to be granted regular entry (i.e. without having to qualify) into the Hall of Fame Tennis Championships in Newport, Rhode Island the week after Wimbledon, which his compatriot Greg Rusedski had won the previous two years.

Bogdanovic was drawn to play against American world 735 in the 1st round, Jesse Levine. He won this match 6–4 7–5, his first ATP tour victory of the season. Alex went on to beat George Bastl of Switzerland 6–1 7–6 (8–6), in the second round, to advance to the quarter-finals of an ATP Tour for the first time in his career. He lost to the 6th seed from Austria, Jürgen Melzer in 3 sets after having won the first set.

=== 2007 ===
Bogdanovic had a slow start to the season with his ranking dropping to 150. However his season picked up its pace when he was victorious in the Valencia challenger raising his ranking to 132. He followed this up with another consecutive challenger final in Cardiff, but failed to beat Frédéric Niemeyer in this encounter.

Bogdanovic then had a poor clay court season with 2 first-round challenger exits and failing to qualify for the French Open main draw. After this came a 2nd-round defeat to Richard Bloomfield at the Surbiton Trophy.

Bogdanovic competed at two ATP tour events, Queen's and the Nottingham Open, before Wimbledon, where he had been granted entry via a wildcard.

At Queen's he managed to gain an impressive victory over world number 42 Hyung-Taik Lee, and beat British youngster Jamie Baker in the second round to play Andy Roddick. He put on a superb performance against Roddick having won the first set 6–4, and pushed Roddick to a close tie-break in the second set. During the tie-break he was two points from victory, but Roddick took advantage of the Hawk-eye system and a correctly challenged call put him 6–5 up in the tie-break before winning the second set to make it one set all. Roddick broke Alex's serve for the first time in the final set making the final result 4–6 7–6(7–5) 6–4. Bogdanovic's impressive run at Queen's meant a career high of 108. After the match Roddick complimented Bogdanovic and claimed he was "lucky to get out of there." He eagerly backed the idea Alex should easily burst into the top 50 at least by the end of 2007, though this did not happen.

In November, Andy Murray split from his coach Brad Gilbert, who was being funded £750,000 a year by the Lawn Tennis Association. Brad Gilbert's contract was due to run until July 2009, but was revised to December 2008 and changed to spend at least 15 weeks coaching Bogdanovic, the British No 2.

=== 2008 ===
Bogdanovic's projected entry into the World's Top 50 did not materialise. In a poor start to 2008, he was involved in Great Britain's Davis Cup defeat by Argentina and slipped out of the Top 200. His poor 2008 continued, with wildcard entries for the Artois Championships and Wimbledon men's singles tournament resulting in defeats. At Wimbledon he faced Simone Bolelli from Italy and lost in four sets 6–7, 6–4, 3–6, 6–7, his seventh consecutive defeat in the first round at Wimbledon. This low was followed by a victory in the Challenger Banque Tournament in Canada, which helped boost Bogdanovic back into the top 200, for a short period at least.

As Great Britain's 2nd ranked player Bogdanovic was selected for the Davis Cup World Group play-off against Austria in September. Playing the first singles rubber against World No 41 Jürgen Melzer, he lost in 4 sets. He played the final rubber against Alexander Peya, a player ranked two places below, in match to decide which country will be relegated from the World Group to the Group One Euro/African Zone. After winning the first, he faded to lose in four sets.

=== 2009 ===
In January 2009, Bogdanovic was dropped from Great Britain's Davis Cup squad. In June, he went out of Wimbledon to Tomáš Berdych in straight sets in 87 minutes in the first round. This was his eighth straight loss at Wimbledon. In total he won 3 out of 27 sets at Wimbledon.

He continued to compete largely on the Challenger circuit, winning in Kolding, Denmark, which helped him to retain his place in the world top 200.

In December, the Lawn Tennis Association decided to cut his annual financial support from £15,000 to the stipulated minimum of £4,000, because they believed he wasn't working hard enough, though Bogdanovic disagreed.

=== 2010 ===
The new Davis Cup Captain Leon Smith wanted Bogdanovic to take part in Great Britain's vital Davis Cup tie vs Turkey in July. Defeat would have meant Great Britain's relegation to Europe Zone Group III. However Bogdanovic declined because of the 'disrespectful' way the Lawn Tennis Association reduced his funding the previous December. Leon Smith told him that he wouldn't receive any wildcards.

Bogdanovic didn't receive his usual wildcard into the Wimbledon main draw and he had to qualify. In the second round of qualifying, he lost to Nicolas Mahut 3–6 6–3 24–22 in a match that lasted over 4 hours.

=== 2011 ===
In March, Leon Smith recalled Bogdanovic to the Davis Cup squad after a three-year absence, for the Euro/Africa Zone Group II tie against Tunisia . Although Bogdanovic (No 374) had lost all six of his live Davis Cup rubbers, he had at least won the Tamarac Futures tournament in Florida this January, and was widely regarded as the most gifted British player after Andy Murray.

=== 2012 ===
In July, Bogdanovic won two Futures titles back to back, Pittsburg, USA Futures F18 and Rochester, USA Futures F19.

Bogdanovic was in the semi-final of the Champaign Challenger, USA. Elsewhere on the Futures circuit, Bogdanovic made the final of the Irvine, USA Futures F26, two semifinals and a quarterfinal.

=== 2013 ===
January saw a semi final appearance at Florida USA F1, then in April, he was a finalist at Oklahoma USA F9.

During the grass court season, he was beaten in the Nottingham Challenger first round, Queen's Club initial qualifying round and Wimbledon second qualifying round.

In July, Bogdanovic played the first rounds of the Winnetka Challenger and the Binghamton Challenger, which were his last matches before his retirement.

== Potential ==
Bogdanovic is generally regarded as a player who never fulfilled his potential. The Times writes that "Bogdanovic has long been regarded as a player too satisfied by failure and in denial of the true facts of tennis life."

When the Lawn Tennis Association reduced his annual funding in 2010, to a minimum of £4,000, because they believed he could work harder if he tried, Bogdanovic declared 'I just thought that was disrespectful because that's untrue. He said my intensity wasn't good enough and that hurt a lot because I've been trying to give it my best shot for the last eight years. If it was easy then everyone would be in the top 100. I found out they didn't believe in me any more. They questioned my efforts and I have always tried to do the best that I can.'

== Post-retirement life ==
After retiring from professional tennis in 2013, Bogdanovic set up and currently runs AB Tennis Services, a tennis academy in Westchase, Florida. His professional Instagram account is @abogdanovic4.

== Challengers and Futures finals ==
=== Singles: 21 (13–8) ===
Legend (singles) ATP Challenger Tour (9–4) ITF Futures Tour (4–4)	Titles by surface Hard (7–5) Clay (3–1) Grass (2–2) Carpet (1–0)	Titles by setting Outdoor (7–6) Indoor (6–2)

Result	W–L	Date	Tournament	Tier	Surface	Opponent	Score
Win	1–0	Feb 2002	Great Britain F1, Nottingham	Futures	Carpet (i)	(United Kingdom) Luke Milligan	6–7^{(5–7)}, 7–6^{(8–6)}, 6–4
Loss	1–1	Jun 2003	Surbiton, UK	Challenger	Grass	(South Africa) Wesley Moodie	4–6, 7–6^{(7–2)}, 1–6
Loss	1–2	May 2004	Great Britain F1, Bournemouth	Futures	Clay	(France) Gaël Monfils	4–6, 3–6
Loss	1–3	Jul 2004	Nottingham, UK	Challenger	Grass	(France) Jo-Wilfried Tsonga	3–6, 4–6
Win	2–3	Jul 2004	Manchester, UK	Challenger	Grass	(Slovakia) Michal Mertiňák	6–1, 6–3
Win	3–3	Jul 2005	Nottingham, UK	Challenger	Grass	(United Kingdom) Mark Hilton	6–3, 7–5
Win	4–3	Nov 2005	Sunderland, UK	Challenger	Hard (i)	(Thailand) Danai Udomchoke	7–6^{(7–4)}, 7–5
Win	5–3	Jan 2006	Wrexham, UK	Challenger	Hard (i)	(France) Stéphane Robert	6–3, 6–2
Win	6–3	Feb 2006	Bergamo, Italy	Challenger	Hard (i)	(Italy) Simone Bolelli	6–1, 3–0 ret.
Loss	6–4	Oct 2006	Mons, Belgium	Challenger	Hard (i)	(Serbia) Janko Tipsarević	4–6, 6–1, 2–6
Win	7–4	Nov 2006	Shrewsbury, UK	Challenger	Hard (i)	(Germany) Mischa Zverev	4–6, 6–4, 6–4
Win	8–4	Apr 2007	Valencia, US	Challenger	Hard	(United States) Zack Fleishman	6–4, 6–7^{(4–7)}, 6–3
Loss	8–5	Apr 2007	Cardiff, UK	Challenger	Hard (i)	(Canada) Frédéric Niemeyer	4–6, 5–7
Win	9–5	Jul 2008	Granby, Canada	Challenger	Hard	(Thailand) Danai Udomchoke	7–6^{(16–14)}, 3–6, 7–6^{(8–6)}
Win	10–5	Oct 2009	Kolding, Denmark	Challenger	Hard (i)	(Croatia) Ivan Dodig	3–6, 7–6^{(9–7)}, def.
Win	11–5	Jan 2011	USA F2, Tamarac	Futures	Clay	(United Kingdom) Daniel Smethurst	6–4, 0–6, 6–2
Loss	11–6	Apr 2011	USA F9, Little Rock	Futures	Hard	(Spain) Arnau Brugués Davi	3–6, 1–6
Win	12–6	Jul 2012	USA F18, Pittsburgh	Futures	Clay	(Australia) Matheson Klein	6–2, 6–4
Win	13–6	Jul 2012	USA F19, Rochester	Futures	Clay	(United States) Chase Buchanan	6–3, 6–4
Loss	13–7	Sep 2012	USA F26, Irvine	Futures	Hard	(United States) Daniel Nguyen	5–7, 2–6
Loss	13–8	Apr 2013	USA F9, Oklahoma City	Futures	Hard	(South Africa) Rik de Voest	3–6, 2–6

== Performance timelines ==
Key
W	F	SF	QF	#R	RR	Q#	DNQ	A	NH

(W) winner; (F) finalist; (SF) semifinalist; (QF) quarterfinalist; (#R) rounds 4, 3, 2, 1; (RR) round-robin stage; (Q#) qualification round; (DNQ) did not qualify; (A) absent; (NH) not held; (SR) strike rate (events won / competed); (W–L) win–loss record.

=== Singles ===
Current through 2014 Australian Open.

Tournament	2002	2003	2004	2005	2006	2007	2008	2009	2010	2011	2012	2013	Career SR	Career W–L
Grand Slam tournaments
Australian Open	A	A	Q2	Q2	A	Q1	Q2	Q2	Q2	A	A	A	0 / 0	0–0
French Open	A	A	A	Q2	Q2	Q2	Q2	Q2	Q1	A	A	A	0 / 0	0–0
Wimbledon	1R	1R	1R	1R	1R	1R	1R	1R	Q2	Q1	A	Q2	0 / 8	0–8
US Open	A	A	1R	Q1	Q1	Q1	Q1	Q1	Q1	A	A	A	0 / 1	0–1
Win–loss	0–1	0–1	0–2	0–1	0–1	0–1	0–1	0–1	0–0	0–0	0–0	0–0	0 / 9	0–9
National representation
Davis Cup	A	1R	A	Z1	Z1	A	1R	A	A	A	A	A		
Win–loss	0–0	1–1	0–0	0–1	0–1	0–0	0–4	0–0	0–0	0–0	0–0	0–0	1 / 7	1–7
