= Thomas Kromann =

Danish tennis player

- Country (sports): Denmark
- Born: 1 June 1987 (age 38) Hellerup, Denmark
- Prize money: $12,586

Singles
- Career record: 1–3
- Career titles: 0
- Highest ranking: No. 855 (22 June 2009)

Doubles
- Career record: 13–8
- Career titles: 0
- Highest ranking: No. 501 (12 October 2009)

Thomas Kromann (born 1 June 1987) is a Danish retired tennis player.

== Doubles titles ==
=== Wins (3) ===
Legend (singles)
Grand Slam (0)
Tennis Masters Cup (0)
ATP Masters Series (0)
ATP Tour (0)
Challengers
Futures (3)

No.	Date	Tournament	Surface	Partner	Opponent	Score
1.	10 May 2009	Sandanski, Bulgaria	Clay	(Australia) John Millman	(Bulgaria) Valentin Dimov (Bulgaria) Todor Enev	3–6, 6–1 [10–5]
2.	2 August 2009	Jūrmala, Latvia	Clay	(Republic of Ireland) Tristan Farron-Mahon	(Latvia) Arturs Kazijevs (Latvia) Miķelis Lībietis	6–4, 6–2
3.	3 August 2014	Copenhagen, Denmark	Clay	(Sweden) Isak Arvidsson	(Netherlands) Sander Arends (Netherlands) Niels Lootsma	7–5, 7–6^{(7–2)}

== See also ==
- List of Denmark Davis Cup team representatives
