= Manchester Trophy Challenger =

Manchester Trophy

Defunct tennis tournament
- Event name: Manchester Trophy
- Location: Manchester, United Kingdom
- Venue: Northern Lawn Tennis Club
- Surface: Grass
- Website: Official website
ATP Tour
- Category: ATP Challenger Tour
- Draw: 32S / 32Q / 16D
- Prize money: €42,500
WTA Tour
- Category: ITF Women's Circuit
- Draw: 32S / 32Q / 16D
- Prize money: $100,000

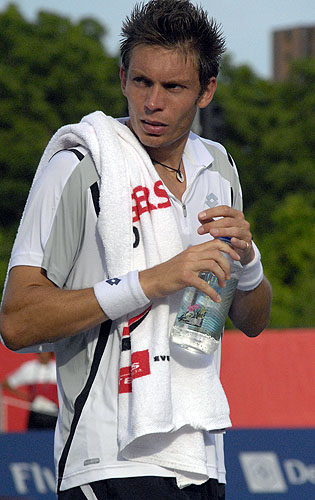
French Nicolas Mahut won his first Challenger title in Manchester in 2003

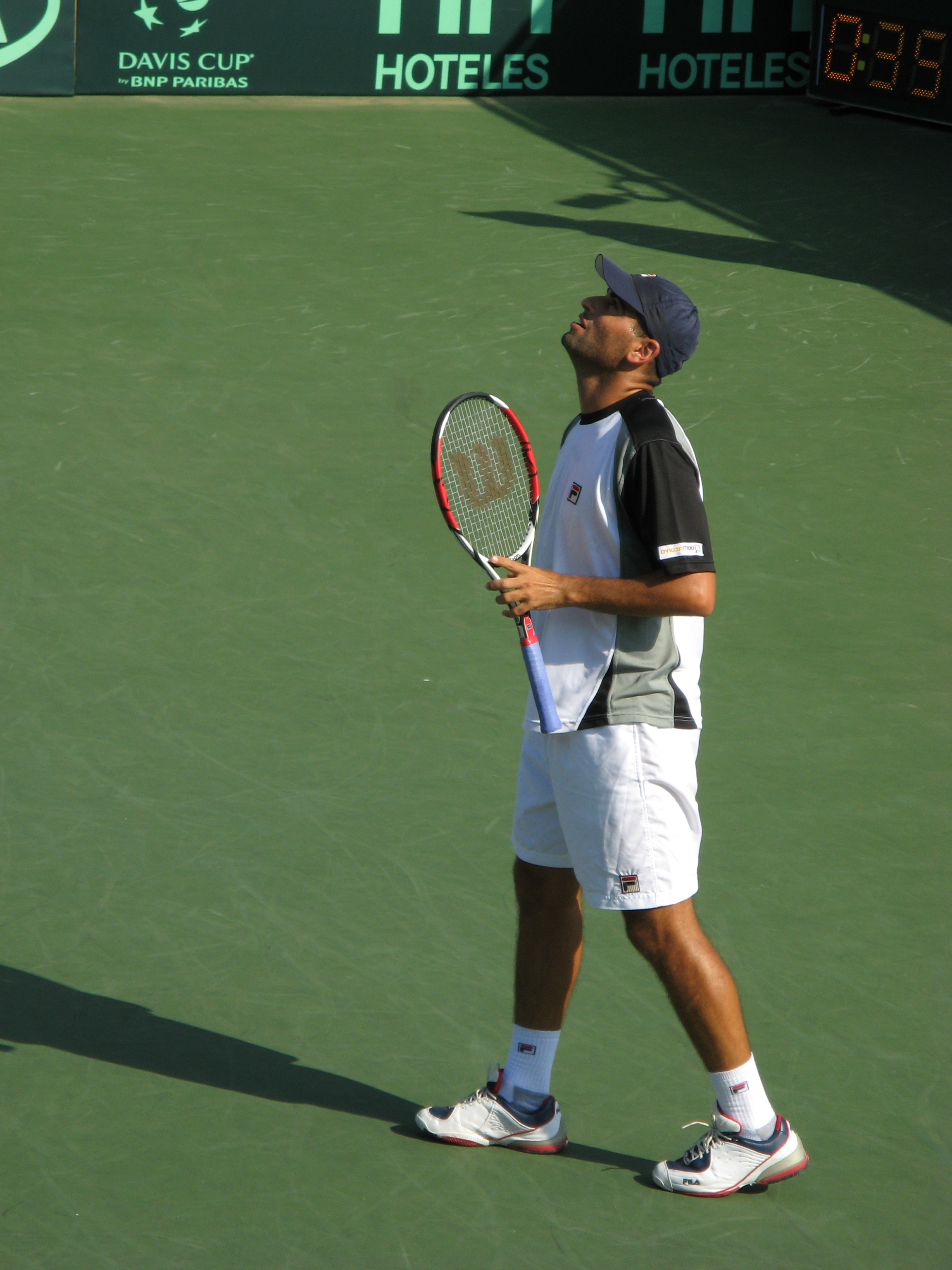
2008 Australian Open doubles champion Andy Ram titled in 2000 alongside Dejan Petrovic

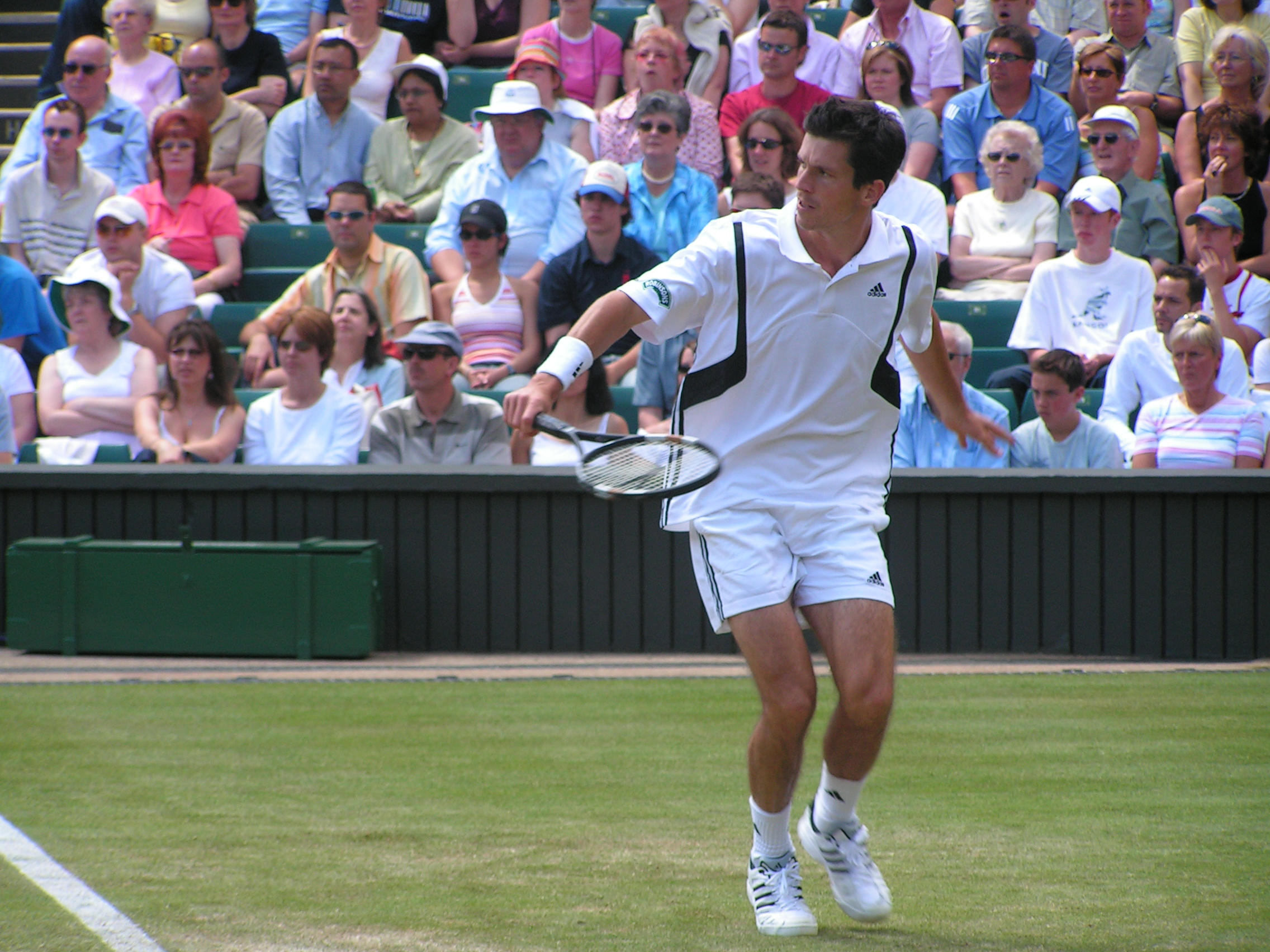
Eventual British top tenner Tim Henman won the doubles event in 1995, partnering Mark Petchey

The Manchester Trophy was a professional tennis tournament played in the United Kingdom on outdoor grass courts. It was previously part of the ATP Challenger Tour and now currently part of the ITF Women's Circuit. It had been held annually at the Northern Lawn Tennis Club in the Didsbury suburb of Manchester, England since 1995. The original defunct tournament, the Manchester Open, began in 1880 as the prestigious Northern Championships and continued until the event became a lower level Challenger tournament in 1995. The Challenger event ended in 2009, but was revived in 2015. The men's tournament was discontinued after the 2016 edition while the women's tournament was established in 2017 and ended in 2019.

== Past finals ==
=== Men's singles ===
Year	Champion	Runner-up	Score
2016	(Germany) Dustin Brown	(Chinese Taipei) Lu Yen-hsun	7–6^{(7–5)}, 6–1
2015	(Australia) Sam Groth	(Australia) Luke Saville	7–5, 6–1
2010– 2014	Not held		
2009	(Belgium) Olivier Rochus	(Netherlands) Igor Sijsling	6–3, 4–6, 6–2
2008	(Sweden) Björn Rehnquist	(United Kingdom) Richard Bloomfield	7–6^{(10–8)}, 0–6, 6–3
2007	(Israel) Harel Levy	(United States) Travis Rettenmaier	6–2, 6–4
2006	(India) Harsh Mankad	(United Kingdom) Joshua Goodall	7–6^{(7–1)}, 7–6^{(7–4)}
2005	(Italy) Daniele Bracciali	(Slovakia) Igor Zelenay	6–4, 6–4
2004	(United Kingdom) Alex Bogdanovic	(Slovakia) Michal Mertiňák	6–1, 6–3
2003	(France) Nicolas Mahut	(Belgium) Gilles Elseneer	6–3, 7–6^{(7–5)}
2002	(Belarus) Vladimir Voltchkov	(Slovakia) Karol Beck	6–4, 7–6^{(7–2)}
2001	(France) Jean-François Bachelot	(United Kingdom) Jamie Delgado	6–4, 6–4
2000	(Italy) Mosé Navarra	(United Kingdom) Martin Lee	6–4, 6–3
1999	(Italy) Igor Gaudi	(South Africa) Neville Godwin	7–6, 6–2
1998	(United Kingdom) Chris Wilkinson	(Italy) Stefano Pescosolido	6–3, 6–4
1997	(Spain) Oscar Burrieza-Lopez	(Italy) Stefano Pescosolido	7–6, 2–6, 6–1
1996	(Australia) Ben Ellwood	(Netherlands) Fernon Wibier	6–4, 6–4
1995	(United Kingdom) Chris Wilkinson	(Germany) Christian Saceanu	6–4, 6–4

=== Women's singles ===
Year	Champion	Runner-up	Score
2020	Tournament cancelled due to the COVID-19 pandemic		
2019	(Poland) Magda Linette	(Kazakhstan) Zarina Diyas	7–6^{(7–1)}, 2–6, 6–3
2018	(Tunisia) Ons Jabeur	(Spain) Sara Sorribes Tormo	6–2, 6–1
2017	(Kazakhstan) Zarina Diyas	(Serbia) Aleksandra Krunić	6–4, 6–4

=== Men's doubles ===
Year	Champions	Runners-up	Score
2016	(India) Purav Raja (India) Divij Sharan	(United Kingdom) Ken Skupski (United Kingdom) Neal Skupski	6–3, 3–6, [11–9]
2015	(Australia) Chris Guccione (Brazil) André Sá	(South Africa) Raven Klaasen (United States) Rajeev Ram	walkover
2010– 2014	Not held		
2009	(United Kingdom) Joshua Goodall (United Kingdom) Jonathan Marray	(United Kingdom) Colin Fleming (United Kingdom) Ken Skupski	6–7^{(1–7)}, 6–3, 11–9
2008	(Australia) Adam Feeney (Australia) Robert Smeets	(India) Harsh Mankad (India) Ashutosh Singh	6–3, 6–7^{(5–7)}, 10–6
2007	(India) Rohan Bopanna (Pakistan) Aisam-ul-Haq Qureshi	(Netherlands) Jesse Huta Galung (Sweden) Michael Ryderstedt	4–6, 6–3, 10–5
2006	(United Kingdom) Joshua Goodall (United Kingdom) Ross Hutchins	(Australia) Chris Guccione (France) Thomas Oger	3–6, 7–5, 10–5
2005	(United Kingdom) Mark Hilton (United Kingdom) Jonathan Marray	(United Kingdom) James Auckland (United Kingdom) Dan Kiernan	6–3, 6–2
2004	(France) Jean-François Bachelot (France) Nicolas Mahut	(Pakistan) Aisam-ul-Haq Qureshi (Croatia) Lovro Zovko	6–2, 6–4
2003	(United Kingdom) Martin Lee (United Kingdom) Arvind Parmar	(United Kingdom) Dan Kiernan (United Kingdom) David Sherwood	6–3, 2–6, 6–2
2002	(Slovakia) Karol Beck (Pakistan) Aisam-ul-Haq Qureshi	(Hong Kong) John Hui (Australia) Anthony Ross	6–3, 7–6^{(7–2)}
2001	(Australia) Ben Ellwood (Sweden) Fredrik Lovén	(South Africa) Wesley Moodie (South Africa) Shaun Rudman	4–6, 7–5, 6–4
2000	(Australia) Dejan Petrovic (Israel) Andy Ram	(Switzerland) Yves Allegro (Switzerland) Ivo Heuberger	6–2, 7–6
1999	(South Africa) Jeff Coetzee (South Africa) Neville Godwin	(United Kingdom) Jamie Delgado (United Kingdom) Martin Lee	6–4, 6–2
1998	(Italy) Mosé Navarra (Italy) Stefano Pescosolido	(Australia) Wayne Arthurs (Australia) Ben Ellwood	6–1, 6–7, 7–6
1997	(United Kingdom) Mark Petchey (United Kingdom) Danny Sapsford	(Israel) Noam Behr (Switzerland) Filippo Veglio	6–3, 6–7, 7–6
1996	(Belarus) Max Mirnyi (Israel) Lior Mor	(Belgium) Dick Norman (Netherlands) Fernon Wibier	7–5, 7–6
1995	(United Kingdom) Tim Henman (United Kingdom) Mark Petchey	(Italy) Massimo Bertolini (Italy) Diego Nargiso	6–3, 6–4

=== Women's doubles ===
Year	Champions	Runners-up	Score
2020	Tournament cancelled due to the COVID-19 pandemic		
2019	(China) Duan Yingying (China) Zhu Lin	(United States) Robin Anderson (Romania) Laura Ioana Paar	6–4, 6–3
2018	(Thailand) Luksika Kumkhum (India) Prarthana Thombare	(United Kingdom) Naomi Broady (United States) Asia Muhammad	7–6^{(7–5)}, 6–3
2017	(Poland) Magdalena Fręch (Belgium) An-Sophie Mestach	(Chinese Taipei) Chang Kai-chen (New Zealand) Marina Erakovic	6–4, 7–6^{(7–5)}
