= 2012 BH Telecom Indoors – Singles =

Singles
- 2012 BH Telecom Indoors

Final
- Champion: (Czech Republic) Jan Hernych
- Runner-up: (Czech Republic) Jan Mertl
- Score: 6–3, 3–6, 7–6^{(7–5)}

Events
Singles	Doubles
← 2011 ·	BH Telecom Indoors	· 2013 →

Amer Delić was the defending champion but decided not to participate.
Jan Hernych won the title, defeating Jan Mertl 6–3, 3–6, 7–6^{(7–5)} in the final.

== Seeds ==
1. (Germany) Andreas Beck (first round)
2. (Germany) Michael Berrer (first round)
3. (Germany) Daniel Brands (first round)
4. (Russia) Alexander Kudryavtsev (semifinals, retired due to a right elbow injury)
5. (Germany) Dustin Brown (semifinals)
6. (Serbia) Dušan Lajović (quarterfinals)
7. (Austria) Martin Fischer (first round)
8. (Lithuania) Laurynas Grigelis (second round)

== Draw ==
=== Key ===
- Q = Qualifier
- WC = Wild card
- LL = Lucky loser
- Alt = Alternate
- SE = Special exempt
- PR = Protected ranking
- ITF = ITF entry
- JE = Junior exempt
- w/o = Walkover
- r = Retired
- d = Defaulted
- SR = Special ranking

=== Finals ===
Semifinals
(Czech Republic) Jan Mertl	4
4	(Russia) Alexander Kudryavtsev	4^{r}
(Czech Republic) Jan Hernych	7^{7}	7^{7}
5	(Germany) Dustin Brown	6^{3}	6^{4}

Final
(Czech Republic) Jan Mertl	3	6	6^{5}
(Czech Republic) Jan Hernych	6	3	7^{7}

=== Top half ===
First round
1	(Germany) A Beck	4	4
(Serbia) I Bozoljac	6	6
(Romania) M Copil	6	7^{7}
(Ukraine) I Marchenko	3	6^{4}
(Czech Republic) J Mertl	7	6^{4}	6
(Italy) M Crugnola	5	7^{7}	2
Q	(Bosnia and Herzegovina) I Gorčić	7^{9}	7^{7}
7	(Austria) M Fischer	6^{7}	6^{3}
4	(Russia) A Kudryavtsev	7^{7}	7
WC	(Bosnia and Herzegovina) T Brkić	6^{0}	5
(Moldova) R Albot	6	6
WC	(Serbia) M Djokovic	4	3
Q	(Kazakhstan) E Korolev	4	2
(Bosnia and Herzegovina) M Bašić	6	6
(Russia) D Matsukevich	3	4
6	(Serbia) D Lajović	6	6

Second round
(Serbia) I Bozoljac	7^{7}	6^{4}	7^{7}
(Romania) M Copil	6^{4}	7^{7}	6^{3}
(Czech Republic) J Mertl	7^{7}	6
Q	(Bosnia and Herzegovina) I Gorčić	6^{4}	4
4	(Russia) A Kudryavtsev	6	6
(Moldova) R Albot	2	4
(Bosnia and Herzegovina) M Bašić	1	4
6	(Serbia) D Lajović	6	6

Quarterfinals
(Serbia) I Bozoljac	6^{4}	6	6^{8}
(Czech Republic) J Mertl	7^{7}	4	7^{10}
4	(Russia) A Kudryavtsev	1	6	6
6	(Serbia) D Lajović	6	3	1

Semifinals
(Czech Republic) J Mertl	4
4	(Russia) A Kudryavtsev	4^{r}

=== Bottom half ===
First round
8	(Lithuania) L Grigelis	6	6
(Russia) M Ledovskikh	1	4
(Croatia) K Mesaroš	4	4
(Poland) J Janowicz	6	6
WC	(Bosnia and Herzegovina) D Džumhur	6	5	3
WC	(Bosnia and Herzegovina) A Šetkić	3	7	6
(Czech Republic) J Hernych	7^{7}	6
3	(Germany) D Brands	6^{5}	2
5	(Germany) D Brown	7^{8}	7^{7}
Q	(Poland) M Przysiężny	6^{6}	6^{5}
(United Kingdom) J Baker	3	6	6^{3}
(Austria) P Oswald	6	3	7^{7}
(France) F Martin	6	7^{10}
(United Kingdom) J Goodall	4	6^{8}
Q	(Serbia) N Ćaćić	6^{5}	6	6
2	(Germany) M Berrer	7^{7}	4	4

Second round
8	(Lithuania) L Grigelis	6	6^{1}	2
(Poland) J Janowicz	3	7^{7}	6
WC	(Bosnia and Herzegovina) A Šetkić	4	4
(Czech Republic) J Hernych	6	6
5	(Germany) D Brown	7^{7}	6
(Austria) P Oswald	6^{2}	0
(France) F Martin	7^{7}	6^{5}	6^{4}
Q	(Serbia) N Ćaćić	6^{5}	7^{7}	7^{7}

Quarterfinals
(Poland) J Janowicz	1	7^{10}	3
(Czech Republic) J Hernych	6	6^{8}	6
5	(Germany) D Brown	6	6
Q	(Serbia) N Ćaćić	4	3

Semifinals
(Czech Republic) J Hernych	7^{7}	7^{7}
5	(Germany) D Brown	6^{3}	6^{4}
