= 2012 BH Telecom Indoors – Doubles =

Doubles
- 2012 BH Telecom Indoors

Final
- Champions: (Germany) Dustin Brown (United Kingdom) Jonathan Marray
- Runners-up: (Slovakia) Michal Mertiňák (Slovakia) Igor Zelenay
- Score: 7–6^{(7–2)}, 2–6, [11–9]

Events
| Singles | Doubles |
| ← 2011 · | BH Telecom Indoors | · 2013 → |

Jamie Delgado and Jonathan Marray were the defending champions but decided not to participate together.
Delgado played alongside Ken Skupski while Marray partnered up with Dustin Brown. They went on to win the final 7–6^{(7–2)}, 2–6, [11–9] against Michal Mertiňák and Igor Zelenay.

== Seeds ==
1. (Germany) Dustin Brown / (United Kingdom) Jonathan Marray (champions)
2. (Slovakia) Michal Mertiňák / (Slovakia) Igor Zelenay (finals)
3. (United Kingdom) Jamie Delgado / (United Kingdom) Ken Skupski (quarterfinals)
4. (Sweden) Johan Brunström / (Croatia) Lovro Zovko (semifinals)

== Draw ==
=== Key ===
- Q = Qualifier
- WC = Wild card
- LL = Lucky loser
- Alt = Alternate
- SE = Special exempt
- PR = Protected ranking
- ITF = ITF entry
- JE = Junior exempt
- w/o = Walkover
- r = Retired
- d = Defaulted
- SR = Special ranking

=== Draw ===
First round
1 | (Germany) D Brown (United Kingdom) J Marray | 6 | 6
(Moldova) R Albot (Romania) M Copil | 4 | 4
(Italy) M Crugnola (Lithuania) L Grigelis | 7^{9} | 6^{2} | [10]
(Germany) A Beck (Germany) P Marx | 6^{7} | 7^{7} | [8]
4 | (Sweden) J Brunström (Croatia) L Zovko | 6 | 7^{9}
WC | (Bosnia and Herzegovina) D Džumhur (Bosnia and Herzegovina) A Šetkić | 4 | 6^{7}
(Serbia) N Ćaćić (Serbia) D Lajović | 5 | 4
(Serbia) I Bozoljac (Germany) D Brands | 7 | 6
(Czech Republic) J Hernych (Czech Republic) J Mertl | 2 | 4
(Russia) A Kudryavtsev (Czech Republic) D Škoch | 6 | 6
(Austria) M Fischer (Austria) P Oswald | 4 | 7^{8} | [12]
3 | (United Kingdom) J Delgado (United Kingdom) K Skupski | 6 | 6^{6} | [14]
(Bosnia and Herzegovina) I Gorčić (Bosnia and Herzegovina) Franjo Raspudić | 6^{3} | 3
(United Kingdom) C Eaton (United Kingdom) D Inglot | 7^{7} | 6
WC | (Bosnia and Herzegovina) M Bašić (Bosnia and Herzegovina) T Brkić | 3 | 7^{7} | [3]
2 | (Slovakia) M Mertiňák (Slovakia) I Zelenay | 6 | 6^{5} | [10]

Quarterfinals
1 | (Germany) D Brown (United Kingdom) J Marray | 6 | 6
(Italy) M Crugnola (Lithuania) L Grigelis | 3 | 2
4 | (Sweden) J Brunström (Croatia) L Zovko | 6 | 7^{8}
(Serbia) I Bozoljac (Germany) D Brands | 3 | 6^{6}
(Russia) A Kudryavtsev (Czech Republic) D Škoch | 6 | 4 | [12]
3 | (United Kingdom) J Delgado (United Kingdom) K Skupski | 4 | 6 | [10]
(United Kingdom) C Eaton (United Kingdom) D Inglot | 6^{4} | 6^{6}
2 | (Slovakia) M Mertiňák (Slovakia) I Zelenay | 7^{7} | 7^{8}

Semifinals
1 | (Germany) D Brown (United Kingdom) J Marray | 7^{7} | 6
4 | (Sweden) J Brunström (Croatia) L Zovko | 6^{4} | 4
(Russia) A Kudryavtsev (Czech Republic) D Škoch | 6^{1} | 4
2 | (Slovakia) M Mertiňák (Slovakia) I Zelenay | 7^{7} | 6

Final
1 | (Germany) D Brown (United Kingdom) J Marray | 7^{7} | 2 | [11]
2 | (Slovakia) M Mertiňák (Slovakia) I Zelenay | 6^{2} | 6 | [9]
