= 2009 BH Telecom Indoors – Singles =

Singles
- 2009 BH Telecom Indoors

Final
- Champion: (Croatia) Ivan Dodig
- Runner-up: (Germany) Dominik Meffert
- Score: 6–4, 6–3

Events
Singles	Doubles
← 2008 ·	BH Telecom Indoors	· 2010 →

Andreas Beck was the defending champion. He decided that he wouldn't play this year.
Ivan Dodig won in the grand finale 6–4, 6–3, against Dominik Meffert.

== Seeds ==
1. (Czech Republic) Lukáš Rosol (first round)
2. (Czech Republic) Pavel Šnobel (first round)
3. (Switzerland) George Bastl (second round)
4. (Poland) Dawid Olejniczak (first round)
5. (Germany) Dominik Meffert (final)
6. (Austria) Andreas Haider-Maurer (semifinals)
7. (United States) Ryler DeHeart (first round)
8. (Slovenia) Blaž Kavčič (quarterfinals)

== Draw ==
=== Key ===
- Q = Qualifier
- WC = Wild card
- LL = Lucky loser
- Alt = Alternate
- SE = Special exempt
- PR = Protected ranking
- ITF = ITF entry
- JE = Junior exempt
- w/o = Walkover
- r = Retired
- d = Defaulted
- SR = Special ranking

=== Final four ===
Semifinals
5	(Germany) Dominik Meffert	6	6
(France) Gary Lugassy	2	4
(Croatia) Ivan Dodig	2	7	6
6	(Austria) Andreas Haider-Maurer	6	6^{5}	3

Final
5	(Germany) Dominik Meffert	4	3
(Croatia) Ivan Dodig	6	6

=== Top half ===
First round
1	(Czech Republic) L Rosol	7	3	6^{4}
(Spain) G Alcaide	5	6	7
(Slovakia) L Lacko	7	7
(Italy) Enrico Burzi	6^{6}	6^{3}
Q	(Croatia) N Mektić	7	7
(Slovakia) I Klec	6^{4}	6^{3}
(Spain) I Cervantes-Huegun	6^{5}	6^{3}
5	(Germany) D Meffert	7	7
4	(Poland) D Olejniczak	3	5
Q	(Montenegro) G Tošić	6	7
(Slovakia) M Semjan	2	4
(France) G Lugassy	6	6
(Russia) K Kravchuk	6	6
WC	(Croatia) I Zovko	1	3
(Slovakia) K Čapkovič	2	6	6
7	(United States) R DeHeart	6	2	1

Second round
(Spain) G Alcaide	3	6^{4}
(Slovakia) L Lacko	6	7
Q	(Croatia) N Mektić	3	7	5
5	(Germany) D Meffert	6	6^{5}	7
Q	(Montenegro) G Tošić	6^{4}	7	2
(France) G Lugassy	7	5	6
(Russia) K Kravchuk	5	6	6
(Slovakia) K Čapkovič	7	4	4

Quarterfinals
(Slovakia) L Lacko	7	4	4
5	(Germany) D Meffert	6^{5}	6	6
(France) G Lugassy	6^{6}	6	6
(Russia) K Kravchuk	7	4	4

Semifinals
5	(Germany) D Meffert	6	6
(France) G Lugassy	2	4

=== Bottom half ===
First round
8	(Slovenia) B Kavčič	3	7	7
(United States) N Monroe	6	6^{4}	6^{6}
(Canada) P-L Duclos	6^{2}	7	4
(Spain) G Olaso	7	6^{3}	6
(Czech Republic) J Mertl	4	3
(Croatia) I Dodig	6	6
Q	(Germany) S Rieschick	3	6^{6}
3	(Switzerland) G Bastl	6	7
6	(Austria) A Haider-Maurer	1	7	6
Q	(Finland) H Kontinen	6	6^{2}	3
WC	(Bosnia and Herzegovina) A Šetkić	2	7	6
WC	(Bosnia and Herzegovina) M Bašić	6	6^{7}	4
(Belgium) Y Mertens	4	6	3
(Latvia) A Juška	6	4	6
WC	(Bosnia and Herzegovina) I Gorčić	6^{3}	6	6
2	(Czech Republic) P Šnobel	7	3	1

Second round
8	(Slovenia) B Kavčič	6	6
(Spain) G Olaso	4	2
(Croatia) I Dodig	6	4	6
3	(Switzerland) G Bastl	4	6	3
6	(Austria) A Haider-Maurer	3	6	6
WC	(Bosnia and Herzegovina) A Šetkić	6	2	1
(Latvia) A Juška	5	4
WC	(Bosnia and Herzegovina) I Gorčić	7	6

Quarterfinals
8	(Slovenia) B Kavčič	4	1
(Croatia) I Dodig	6	6
6	(Austria) A Haider-Maurer	7	6
WC	(Bosnia and Herzegovina) I Gorčić	5	3

Semifinals
(Croatia) I Dodig	2	7	6
6	(Austria) A Haider-Maurer	6	6^{5}	3
