= 2009 BH Telecom Indoors – Doubles =

Doubles
- 2009 BH Telecom Indoors

Final
- Champions: (Russia) Konstantin Kravchuk (Poland) Dawid Olejniczak
- Runners-up: (United Kingdom) James Auckland (Netherlands) Rogier Wassen
- Score: 6–2, 3–6, 10–7

Events
Singles	Doubles
← 2008 ·	BH Telecom Indoors	· 2010 →

The 2009 BH Telecom Indoors doubles was part of the 2009 BH Telecom Indoors professional tennis tournament. Johan Brunström and Frederik Nielsen were the defenders of championship title, but they didn't take part this year; and the title was won by Konstantin Kravchuk and Dawid Olejniczak in the final 6–2, 3–6, 10–7, against James Auckland and Rogier Wassen.

== Seeds ==
1. (United Kingdom) James Auckland / (Netherlands) Rogier Wassen (final)
2. (Canada) Pierre-Ludovic Duclos / (United States) Nicholas Monroe (semifinals)
3. (Latvia) Andis Juška / (Czech Republic) Lukáš Rosol (first round)
4. (Switzerland) George Bastl / (Czech Republic) Pavel Šnobel (quarterfinals)

== Draw ==
=== Key ===
- Q = Qualifier
- WC = Wild card
- LL = Lucky loser
- Alt = Alternate
- SE = Special exempt
- PR = Protected ranking
- ITF = ITF entry
- JE = Junior exempt
- w/o = Walkover
- r = Retired
- d = Defaulted
- SR = Special ranking

=== Draw ===
First round
1	(United Kingdom) J Auckland (Netherlands) R Wassen	6^{2}	6	[10]
(Romania) M Copil (Slovakia) I Klec	7	1	[5]
WC	(Bosnia and Herzegovina) Jasmin Ademović (Bosnia and Herzegovina) A Šetkić	6	5	[3]
WC	(Bosnia and Herzegovina) M Bašić (Croatia) I Dodig	3	7	[10]
4	(Switzerland) G Bastl (Czech Republic) P Šnobel	6	7
WC	(Bosnia and Herzegovina) I Gorčić (Bosnia and Herzegovina) Zlatan Kadrić	4	6^{3}
(Slovenia) B Kavčič (Slovakia) M Semjan	3	5
(United States) R DeHeart (Germany) S Rieschick	6	7
(Spain) I Cervantes-Huegun (Spain) G Olaso	6	3	[14]
(Slovakia) K Čapkovič (Czech Republic) J Mertl	3	6	[12]
(Russia) K Kravchuk (Poland) D Olejniczak	6	6
3	(Latvia) A Juška (Czech Republic) L Rosol	4	4
(Spain) G Alcaide (Italy) Enrico Burzi	6	6
ALT	(Croatia) N Mektić (Croatia) I Zovko	4	2
(Serbia) N Ćirić (Bulgaria) I Traykov	4	7	[10]
2	(Canada) P-L Duclos (United States) N Monroe	6	6^{5}	[12]

Quarterfinals
1	(United Kingdom) J Auckland (Netherlands) R Wassen	6	2	[10]
WC	(Bosnia and Herzegovina) M Bašić (Croatia) I Dodig	4	6	[8]
4	(Switzerland) G Bastl (Czech Republic) P Šnobel	6^{5}	7	[8]
(United States) R DeHeart (Germany) S Rieschick	7	6^{2}	[10]
(Spain) I Cervantes-Huegun (Spain) G Olaso	3	3
(Russia) K Kravchuk (Poland) D Olejniczak	6	6
(Spain) G Alcaide (Italy) E Burzi	4	3
2	(Canada) P-L Duclos (United States) N Monroe	6	6

Semifinals
1	(United Kingdom) J Auckland (Netherlands) R Wassen	6	6
(United States) R DeHeart (Germany) S Rieschick	3	4
(Russia) K Kravchuk (Poland) D Olejniczak	7	6
2	(Canada) P-L Duclos (United States) N Monroe	5	3

Finals
1	(United Kingdom) J Auckland (Netherlands) R Wassen	2	6	[7]
(Russia) K Kravchuk (Poland) D Olejniczak	6	3	[10]
