= 2013 BH Telecom Indoors – Doubles =

Doubles
- 2013 BH Telecom Indoors

Final
- Champions: (Bosnia and Herzegovina) Mirza Bašić (Bosnia and Herzegovina) Tomislav Brkić
- Runners-up: (Slovakia) Karol Beck (Slovakia) Igor Zelenay
- Score: 6–3, 7–5

Events
Singles	Doubles
- BH Telecom Indoors

Dustin Brown and Jonathan Marray were the defending champions but Marray decided not to participate.
Brown played alongside Christopher Kas, but lost in the quarterfinals to Mirza Bašić and Tomislav Brkić.
Bašić and Brkić defeated Karol Beck and Igor Zelenay 6–3, 7–5 in the final to continue their run as a wildcard pair, to win the title.

== Seeds ==
1. (Germany) Dustin Brown / (Germany) Christopher Kas (quarterfinals)
2. (Slovakia) Karol Beck / (Slovakia) Igor Zelenay (final)
3. (Croatia) Marin Draganja / (Croatia) Nikola Mektić (first round)
4. (Croatia) Mate Pavić / (Croatia) Franko Škugor (quarterfinals)

== Draw ==
Key

- Q = Qualifier
- WC = Wild card
- LL = Lucky loser
- Alt = Alternate
- ITF = ITF entry
- PR = Protected ranking
- SR = Special ranking
- SE = Special exempt
- JE = Junior exempt
- JR = Junior Accelerator Programme entrant
- CO = College Accelerator Programme entrant
- NG = Next Gen Accelerator Program entrant
- w/o = Walkover
- r = Retired
- d = Defaulted

=== Draw ===
First round
1	(Germany) D Brown (Germany) C Kas	3	6	[10]
(Belgium) N Desein (Czech Republic) J Mertl	6	3	[5]
(Belgium) Y Mertens (Netherlands) M Middelkoop	3	2
WC	(Bosnia and Herzegovina) M Bašić (Bosnia and Herzegovina) T Brkić	6	6
3	(Croatia) M Draganja (Croatia) N Mektić	4	6	[9]
(Bosnia and Herzegovina) D Džumhur (Czech Republic) J Veselý	6	3	[11]
(Germany) S Greul (Germany) B Knittel	6	7
(Kazakhstan) E Korolev (Italy) A Motti	2	5
(Australia) R Junaid (France) F Martin	6	6
(Croatia) T Androić (Croatia) D Marcan	4	1
WC	(Serbia) N Čačić (Bosnia and Herzegovina) I Gorčić	3	3
4	(Croatia) M Pavić (Croatia) F Škugor	6	6
(France) P-H Herbert (Ukraine) O Nedovyesov	6	6
(Republic of Ireland) J Cluskey (Spain) A Menéndez-Maceiras	4	2
WC	(Croatia) Antun Pehar (Bosnia and Herzegovina) Franjo Raspudić	1	2
2	(Slovakia) K Beck (Slovakia) I Zelenay	6	6

Quarterfinals
1	(Germany) D Brown (Germany) C Kas	6	3	[9]
WC	(Bosnia and Herzegovina) M Bašić (Bosnia and Herzegovina) T Brkić	4	6	[11]
(Bosnia and Herzegovina) D Džumhur (Czech Republic) J Veselý	3	1
(Germany) S Greul (Germany) B Knittel	6	6
(Australia) R Junaid (France) F Martin	6	6
4	(Croatia) M Pavić (Croatia) F Škugor	3	4
(France) P-H Herbert (Ukraine) O Nedovyesov	5	6	[3]
2	(Slovakia) K Beck (Slovakia) I Zelenay	7	4	[10]

Semifinals
WC	(Bosnia and Herzegovina) M Bašić (Bosnia and Herzegovina) T Brkić	7^{7}	6
(Germany) S Greul (Germany) B Knittel	6^{3}	4
(Australia) R Junaid (France) F Martin	6	6^{4}	[6]
2	(Slovakia) K Beck (Slovakia) I Zelenay	4	7^{7}	[10]

Final
WC	(Bosnia and Herzegovina) M Bašić (Bosnia and Herzegovina) T Brkić	6	7
2	(Slovakia) K Beck (Slovakia) I Zelenay	3	5
