= 2010 BH Telecom Indoors – Singles =

Singles
- 2010 BH Telecom Indoors

Final
- Champion: (France) Édouard Roger-Vasselin
- Runner-up: (Slovakia) Karol Beck
- Score: 6–7(5), 6–3, 1–0, ret.

Events
Singles	Doubles
← 2009 ·	BH Telecom Indoors	· 2011 →

Ivan Dodig was the defending champion; however, he lost 3–6, 6–3, 3–6 to Karol Beck in the semifinal.
Édouard Roger-Vasselin won in the final, because Karol Beck retired when the result was 6–7(5), 6–3, 1–0 for the Frenchman.

== Seeds ==
1. (Slovakia) Karol Beck (final, retired)
2. (Turkey) Marsel İlhan (first round)
3. (Switzerland) Stéphane Bohli (second round)
4. (Czech Republic) Jan Hernych (first round)
5. (Belgium) Kristof Vliegen (first round)
6. (United Kingdom) Alex Bogdanovic (quarterfinals)
7. (France) Édouard Roger-Vasselin (champion)
8. (Czech Republic) Lukáš Rosol (second round)

== Draw ==
=== Key ===
- Q = Qualifier
- WC = Wild card
- LL = Lucky loser
- Alt = Alternate
- SE = Special exempt
- PR = Protected ranking
- ITF = ITF entry
- JE = Junior exempt
- w/o = Walkover
- r = Retired
- d = Defaulted
- SR = Special ranking

=== Finals ===
Semifinals
1	(Slovakia) Karol Beck	6	3	6
(Croatia) Ivan Dodig	3	6	3
7	(France) Édouard Roger-Vasselin	6	6
(Germany) Tobias Kamke	1	2

Final
1	(Slovakia) Karol Beck	7	3	0r
7	(France) Édouard Roger-Vasselin	6^{5}	6	1

=== Top half ===
First round
1	(Slovakia) K Beck	6	6
WC	(Bosnia and Herzegovina) M Bašić	1	3
Q	(Russia) E Donskoy	6^{6}	5
WC	(Bosnia and Herzegovina) A Šetkić	7	7
WC	(Bosnia and Herzegovina) T Brkić	2	7	6
(Czech Republic) D Lojda	6	6^{5}	4
(Netherlands) I Sijsling	6^{4}	6	5
6	(United Kingdom) A Bogdanovic	7	4	7
3	(Switzerland) S Bohli	6	7
(Croatia) R Karanušić	2	6^{2}
WC	(Bosnia and Herzegovina) I Gorčić	7	4	7
(Netherlands) R Sluiter	5	6	6^{6}
(Croatia) I Dodig	6	6
(Russia) E Kirillov	4	0
(Spain) I Cervantes-Huegun	2	3
8	(Czech Republic) L Rosol	6	6

Second round
1	(Slovakia) K Beck	3	7	7
WC	(Bosnia and Herzegovina) A Šetkić	6	6^{10}	6^{1}
WC	(Bosnia and Herzegovina) T Brkić	6^{4}	3
6	(United Kingdom) A Bogdanovic	7	6
3	(Switzerland) S Bohli	4	7	3
WC	(Bosnia and Herzegovina) I Gorčić	6	6^{4}	6
(Croatia) I Dodig	6	7
8	(Czech Republic) L Rosol	3	5

Quarterfinals
1	(Slovakia) K Beck	6^{5}	6	7
6	(United Kingdom) A Bogdanovic	7	4	6^{6}
WC	(Bosnia and Herzegovina) I Gorčić	1	6	6^{6}
(Croatia) I Dodig	6	4	7

Semifinals
1	(Slovakia) K Beck	6	3	6
(Croatia) I Dodig	3	6	3

=== Bottom half ===
First round
7	(France) É Roger-Vasselin	6^{2}	7	6
(France) N Mahut	7	6^{5}	4
(Czech Republic) J Minář	6	6
(Slovakia) D Hrbatý	3	4
PR	(Luxembourg) G Müller	6^{4}	6^{5}
(Russia) K Kravchuk	7	7
Q	(Netherlands) M Middelkoop	6	6
4	(Czech Republic) J Hernych	3	4
5	(Belgium) K Vliegen	7	1	3
(Italy) S Galvani	6^{3}	6	6
Q	(Sweden) F Prpic	6	4	7
(United States) R DeHeart	4	6	6^{6}
(Germany) T Kamke	6	6
Q	(Croatia) M Hižak	4	4
(Republic of Ireland) C Niland	4	6	7
2	(Turkey) M İlhan	6	3	6^{4}

Second round
7	(France) É Roger-Vasselin	6	7
(Czech Republic) J Minář	3	5
(Russia) K Kravchuk	3	3
Q	(Netherlands) M Middelkoop	6	6
(Italy) S Galvani	6	6^{3}	6
Q	(Sweden) F Prpic	2	7	4
(Germany) T Kamke	6	6
(Republic of Ireland) C Niland	0	3

Quarterfinals
7	(France) É Roger-Vasselin	6	7
Q	(Netherlands) M Middelkoop	4	6^{5}
(Italy) S Galvani	6^{0}	6^{6}
(Germany) T Kamke	7	7

Semifinals
7	(France) É Roger-Vasselin	6	6
(Germany) T Kamke	1	2
