= 2009 BH Telecom Indoors =

Tennis tournament

- Date: March 23 – March 29
- Edition: 7th
- Location: Sarajevo, Bosnia and Herzegovina

Champions

Singles
- (Croatia) Ivan Dodig

Doubles
- (Russia) Konstantin Kravchuk / (Poland) Dawid Olejniczak
← 2008 ·	BH Telecom Indoors	· 2010 →

The 2009 BH Telecom Indoors was a professional tennis tournament played on indoor hard courts. It was part of the 2009 ATP Challenger Tour. It took place in Sarajevo, Bosnia and Herzegovina between 23 and 29 March 2009.

== Singles entrants ==
=== Seeds ===
Nationality	Player	Ranking*	Seeding
CZE	Lukáš Rosol	137	1
CZE	Pavel Šnobel	157	2
SUI	George Bastl	217	3
POL	Dawid Olejniczak	234	4
GER	Dominik Meffert	250	5
AUT	Andreas Haider-Maurer	265	6
USA	Ryler DeHeart	270	7
SLO	Blaž Kavčič	277	8

- Rankings are as of March 16, 2009.

=== Other entrants ===
The following players received wildcards into the singles main draw:

- (Bosnia and Herzegovina) Mirza Bašić
- (Bosnia and Herzegovina) Ismar Gorčić
- (Bosnia and Herzegovina) Aldin Šetkić
- (Croatia) Ivan Zovko

The following players received entry from the qualifying draw:

- (Finland) Henri Kontinen
- (Croatia) Nikola Mektić
- (Germany) Sebastian Rieschick
- (Montenegro) Goran Tošić

== Champions ==
=== Men's singles ===
(Croatia) Ivan Dodig def. (Germany) Dominik Meffert, 6–4, 6–3

=== Men's doubles ===
(Russia) Konstantin Kravchuk / (Poland) Dawid Olejniczak def. (United Kingdom) James Auckland / (Netherlands) Rogier Wassen, 6–2, 3–6, [10–7]
