= 2010 BH Telecom Indoors – Doubles =

Doubles
- 2010 BH Telecom Indoors

Final
- Champions: (France) Nicolas Mahut (France) Édouard Roger-Vasselin
- Runners-up: (Croatia) Ivan Dodig (Czech Republic) Lukáš Rosol
- Score: 7–6(6), 6–7(7), [10–5]

Events
Singles	Doubles
← 2009 ·	BH Telecom Indoors	· 2011 →

Konstantin Kravchuk and Dawid Olejniczak were the defending champions, but they chose to not participate this year.
Nicolas Mahut and Édouard Roger-Vasselin won in the final 7–6(6), 6–7(7), [10–5], against Ivan Dodig and Lukáš Rosol.

== Seeds ==
1. (France) Nicolas Mahut / (France) Édouard Roger-Vasselin (champions)
2. (Switzerland) Yves Allegro / (Croatia) Lovro Zovko (semifinals)
3. (Austria) Alexander Peya / (Austria) Martin Slanar (quarterfinals)
4. (Germany) Martin Emmrich / (Sweden) Andreas Siljeström (first round)

== Draw ==
=== Key ===
- Q = Qualifier
- WC = Wild card
- LL = Lucky loser
- Alt = Alternate
- SE = Special exempt
- PR = Protected ranking
- ITF = ITF entry
- JE = Junior exempt
- w/o = Walkover
- r = Retired
- d = Defaulted
- SR = Special ranking

=== Draw ===
First round
1	(France) N Mahut (France) É Roger-Vasselin	6	7
(Croatia) R Karanušić (Netherlands) M Middelkoop	3	6^{2}
WC	(Bosnia and Herzegovina) M Bašić (Bosnia and Herzegovina) I Gorčić	7	4	[12]
(Croatia) F Škugor (Croatia) I Zovko	5	6	[10]
4	(Germany) M Emmrich (Sweden) A Siljeström	4	6	[8]
(United Kingdom) D Inglot (United States) D Martin	6	3	[10]
(Bosnia and Herzegovina) T Brkić (Bosnia and Herzegovina) A Šetkić	5	6^{3}
(Canada) P-L Duclos (Italy) S Galvani	7	7
(Croatia) I Dodig (Czech Republic) L Rosol
(Czech Republic) J Hernych (Czech Republic) I Minář	w/o
(Germany) T Kamke (Czech Republic) D Lojda	4	2
3	(Austria) A Peya (Austria) M Slanar	6	6
WC	(Bosnia and Herzegovina) D Džumhur (Bosnia and Herzegovina) F Raspudić	1	2
(Netherlands) I Sijsling (Netherlands) R Sluiter	6	6
(Russia) E Kirillov (Russia) A Kudryavtsev	1	6^{6}
2	(Switzerland) Y Allegro (Croatia) L Zovko	6	7

Quarterfinals
1	(France) N Mahut (France) É Roger-Vasselin	7	6
WC	(Bosnia and Herzegovina) M Bašić (Bosnia and Herzegovina) I Gorčić	6^{5}	3
(United Kingdom) D Inglot (United States) D Martin	6^{4}	6	[10]
(Canada) P-L Duclos (Italy) S Galvani	7	3	[7]
(Croatia) I Dodig (Czech Republic) L Rosol	6	6
3	(Austria) A Peya (Austria) M Slanar	3	4
(Netherlands) I Sijsling (Netherlands) R Sluiter	6^{5}	6^{3}
2	(Switzerland) Y Allegro (Croatia) L Zovko	7	7

Semifinals
1	(France) N Mahut (France) É Roger-Vasselin	7	7
(United Kingdom) D Inglot (United States) D Martin	5	6^{6}
(Croatia) I Dodig (Czech Republic) L Rosol	6	6
2	(Switzerland) Y Allegro (Croatia) L Zovko	3	3

Finals
1	(France) N Mahut (France) É Roger-Vasselin	7	6^{7}	[10]
(Croatia) I Dodig (Czech Republic) L Rosol	6^{6}	7	[5]
