= 2013 BH Telecom Indoors =

- Date: 11–17 March
- Edition: 11th
- Draw: 32S / 16D
- Prize money: €30,000+H
- Surface: Hard
- Location: Sarajevo, Bosnia and Herzegovina

Champions

Singles
- (France) Adrian Mannarino

Doubles
- (Bosnia and Herzegovina) Mirza Bašić / (Bosnia and Herzegovina) Tomislav Brkić
← 2012 ·	BH Telecom Indoors	· 2014 →

The 2013 BH Telecom Indoors was a professional tennis tournament played on hard courts. It was the eleventh edition of the tournament which was part of the 2013 ATP Challenger Tour. It took place in Sarajevo, Bosnia and Herzegovina between 11 and 17 March 2013.

== ATP entrants ==
=== Seeds ===
Country	Player	Rank^{1}	Seed
SLO	Blaž Kavčič	88	1
FRA	Josselin Ouanna	139	2
SRB	Dušan Lajović	152	3
FRA	Adrian Mannarino	154	4
GER	Simon Greul	156	5
GER	Dustin Brown	163	6
GER	Cedrik-Marcel Stebe	167	7
SVK	Karol Beck	169	8

- ^{1} Rankings are as of March 4, 2013.

=== Other entrants ===
The following players received wildcards into the singles main draw:

- (Bosnia and Herzegovina) Mirza Bašić
- (Bosnia and Herzegovina) Tomislav Brkić
- (Bosnia and Herzegovina) Ismar Gorčić
- (Bosnia and Herzegovina) Franjo Raspudić

The following players received entry from the qualifying draw:

- (Croatia) Marin Draganja
- (France) Fabrice Martin
- (Croatia) Ante Pavić
- (Slovakia) Igor Zelenay

== Doubles main-draw entrants ==
=== Seeds ===
Country	Player	Country	Player	Rank^{1}	Seed
GER	Dustin Brown	GER	Christopher Kas	125	1
SVK	Karol Beck	SVK	Igor Zelenay	288	2
CRO	Marin Draganja	CRO	Nikola Mektić	326	3
CRO	Mate Pavić	CRO	Franko Škugor	328	4

- ^{1} Rankings as of March 4, 2013.

=== Other entrants ===
The following pairs received wildcards into the doubles main draw:

- (Bosnia and Herzegovina) Mirza Bašić / (Bosnia and Herzegovina) Tomislav Brkić
- (Serbia) Nikola Ćaćić / (Bosnia and Herzegovina) Ismar Gorčić
- (Croatia) Antun Pehar / (Bosnia and Herzegovina) Franjo Raspudić

== Champions ==
=== Singles ===
- (France) Adrian Mannarino def. (Germany) Dustin Brown, 7–6^{(7–3)}, 7–6^{(7–2)}

=== Doubles ===
- (Bosnia and Herzegovina) Mirza Bašić / (Bosnia and Herzegovina) Tomislav Brkić vs. (Slovakia) Karol Beck / (Slovakia) Igor Zelenay, 6–3, 7–5
