= 2011 BH Telecom Indoors – Doubles =

Doubles
- 2011 BH Telecom Indoors

Final
- Champions: (United Kingdom) Jamie Delgado (United Kingdom) Jonathan Marray
- Runners-up: (Switzerland) Yves Allegro (Germany) Andreas Beck
- Score: 7–6(4), 6–2

Events
Singles	Doubles
← 2010 ·	BH Telecom Indoors	· 2012 →

Nicolas Mahut and Édouard Roger-Vasselin were the defending champions, but they withdrew before their first match against Tomislav Brkić and Damir Džumhur.
Jamie Delgado and Jonathan Marray won the final against Yves Allegro and Andreas Beck 7–6(4), 6–2.

== Seeds ==
1. (United Kingdom) Ken Skupski / (Croatia) Lovro Zovko (quarterfinals)
2. (Poland) Tomasz Bednarek / (Germany) Philipp Marx (quarterfinals)
3. (Germany) Frank Moser / (Czech Republic) David Škoch (semifinals)
4. (France) Nicolas Mahut / (France) Édouard Roger-Vasselin (withdrew)

== Draw ==
=== Key ===
- Q = Qualifier
- WC = Wild card
- LL = Lucky loser
- Alt = Alternate
- SE = Special exempt
- PR = Protected ranking
- ITF = ITF entry
- JE = Junior exempt
- w/o = Walkover
- r = Retired
- d = Defaulted
- SR = Special ranking

=== Draw ===
First round
1	(United Kingdom) K Skupski (Croatia) L Zovko	6	6
(Slovakia) A Martin (Estonia) J Zopp	2	3
(Switzerland) Y Allegro (Germany) A Beck	6	6
(France) O Charroin (Sweden) A Siljeström	3	4
3	(Germany) F Moser (Czech Republic) D Škoch	7	6
(Australia) B Klein (Australia) J Millman	5	3
(Italy) A Motti (Denmark) F Nielsen	3	3
(Germany) M Emmrich (Poland) M Kowalczyk	6	6
(Austria) M Fischer (Austria) B Steinberger	3	5
(Spain) R Bautista-Agut (Netherlands) M Middelkoop	6	7
WC	(Bosnia and Herzegovina) T Brkić (Bosnia and Herzegovina) D Džumhur	w/o
4	(France) N Mahut (France) É Roger-Vasselin
(United Kingdom) J Delgado (United Kingdom) J Marray	6	6
WC	(Bosnia and Herzegovina) A Delić (Bosnia and Herzegovina) A Šetkić	3	2
WC	(Bosnia and Herzegovina) M Bašić (Bosnia and Herzegovina) I Gorčić	6^{3}	1
2	(Poland) T Bednarek (Germany) P Marx	7	6

Quarterfinals
1	(United Kingdom) K Skupski (Croatia) L Zovko	3	6	[6]
(Switzerland) Y Allegro (Germany) A Beck	6	3	[10]
3	(Germany) F Moser (Czech Republic) D Škoch	6	7
(Germany) M Emmrich (Poland) M Kowalczyk	3	6^{5}
(Spain) R Bautista-Agut (Netherlands) M Middelkoop	3	4
WC	(Bosnia and Herzegovina) T Brkić (Bosnia and Herzegovina) D Džumhur	6	6
(United Kingdom) J Delgado (United Kingdom) J Marray	7	7
2	(Poland) T Bednarek (Germany) P Marx	5	5

Semifinals
(Switzerland) Y Allegro (Germany) A Beck	6	4	[10]
3	(Germany) F Moser (Czech Republic) D Škoch	3	6	[5]
WC	(Bosnia and Herzegovina) T Brkić (Bosnia and Herzegovina) D Džumhur	2	6^{6}
(United Kingdom) J Delgado (United Kingdom) J Marray	6	7

Final
(Switzerland) Y Allegro (Germany) A Beck	6^{4}	2
(United Kingdom) J Delgado (United Kingdom) J Marray	7	6
