= 2011 BH Telecom Indoors =

- Date: 7–13 March
- Edition: 9th
- Surface: Hard (indoor)
- Location: Sarajevo, Bosnia and Herzegovina

Champions

Singles
- Amer Delić

Doubles
- Jamie Delgado / Jonathan Marray
← 2010 ·	BH Telecom Indoors	· 2012 →

The 2011 BH Telecom Indoors was a professional tennis tournament played on hard courts. It was the ninth edition of the tournament which was part of the 2011 ATP Challenger Tour. It took place in Sarajevo, Bosnia and Herzegovina between 7 and 13 March 2011.

== ATP entrants ==
=== Seeds ===
Country	Player	Rank^{1}	Seed
BUL	Grigor Dimitrov	78	1
SVN	Blaž Kavčič	81	2
FRA	Nicolas Mahut	83	3
RUS	Dmitry Tursunov	105	4
FRA	Édouard Roger-Vasselin	116	5
GER	Andreas Beck	130	6
IRL	Conor Niland	133	7
SLO	Grega Žemlja	137	8

- Rankings are as of February 28, 2011.

=== Other entrants ===
The following players received wildcards into the singles main draw:

- (Bosnia and Herzegovina) Mirza Bašić
- (Bosnia and Herzegovina) Tomislav Brkić
- (Bosnia and Herzegovina) Amer Delić
- (Bosnia and Herzegovina) Franjo Raspudić

The following players received entry from the qualifying draw:

- (Croatia) Roko Karanušić
- (Netherlands) Matwé Middelkoop
- (Croatia) Ante Pavić
- (Switzerland) Alexander Sadecky

The following players received entry as a lucky loser into the singles main draw:

- (Croatia) Mislav Hižak
- (Croatia) Dino Marcan

== Champions ==
=== Singles ===
(Bosnia and Herzegovina) Amer Delić def. (Slovakia) Karol Beck, walkover

=== Doubles ===
(United Kingdom) Jamie Delgado / (United Kingdom) Jonathan Marray def. (Switzerland) Yves Allegro / (Germany) Andreas Beck, 7–6(4), 6–2
