= 2013 BH Telecom Indoors – Singles =

Singles
- 2013 BH Telecom Indoors

Final
- Champion: (France) Adrian Mannarino
- Runner-up: (Germany) Dustin Brown
- Score: 7–6^{(7–3)}, 7–6^{(7–2)}

Events
Singles	Doubles
- BH Telecom Indoors

Jan Hernych was the defending champion but lost in the second round to Pierre-Hugues Herbert.
Adrian Mannarino defeated Dustin Brown 7–6^{(7–3)}, 7–6^{(7–2)} in the final to win the title.

== Seeds ==
1. (Slovenia) Blaž Kavčič (first round)
2. (France) Josselin Ouanna (second round)
3. (Serbia) Dušan Lajović (second round)
4. (France) Adrian Mannarino (champion)
5. (Germany) Simon Greul (second round)
6. (Germany) Dustin Brown (final)
7. (Germany) Cedrik-Marcel Stebe (first round)
8. (Slovakia) Karol Beck (semifinals)

== Draw ==
Key

- Q = Qualifier
- WC = Wild card
- LL = Lucky loser
- Alt = Alternate
- ITF = ITF entry
- PR = Protected ranking
- SR = Special ranking
- SE = Special exempt
- JE = Junior exempt
- JR = Junior Accelerator Programme entrant
- CO = College Accelerator Programme entrant
- NG = Next Gen Accelerator Program entrant
- w/o = Walkover
- r = Retired
- d = Defaulted

=== Finals ===
Semifinals
8	(Slovakia) Karol Beck	6^{6}	4
6	(Germany) Dustin Brown	7^{8}	6
4	(France) Adrian Mannarino	6	6
(Croatia) Nikola Mektić	2	4

Final
6	(Germany) Dustin Brown	6^{3}	6^{2}
4	(France) Adrian Mannarino	7^{7}	7^{7}

=== Top half ===
First round
1	(Slovenia) B Kavčič	7^{7}	3	4
(Czech Republic) J Veselý	6^{4}	6	6
WC	(Bosnia and Herzegovina) T Brkić	7^{8}	6
WC	(Bosnia and Herzegovina) Franjo Raspudić	6^{6}	3
WC	(Bosnia and Herzegovina) M Bašić	3	3
Q	(France) F Martin	6	6
(Spain) A Menéndez-Maceiras	7^{7}	4	5
8	(Slovakia) K Beck	6^{5}	6	7
3	(Serbia) D Lajović	6	6
(Portugal) P Sousa	0	4
(Kazakhstan) E Korolev	6	6
(Germany) B Knittel	4	4
(Ukraine) O Nedovyesov	6	6
Q	(Slovakia) I Zelenay	3	3
(Italy) A Giannessi	3	3
6	(Germany) D Brown	6	6

Second round
(Czech Republic) J Veselý	7^{7}	6^{5}	3
WC	(Bosnia and Herzegovina) T Brkić	6^{5}	7^{7}	6
Q	(France) F Martin	2	6^{3}
8	(Slovakia) K Beck	6	7^{7}
3	(Serbia) D Lajović	5	3
(Kazakhstan) E Korolev	7	6
(Ukraine) O Nedovyesov	3	4
6	(Germany) D Brown	6	6

Quarterfinals
WC	(Bosnia and Herzegovina) T Brkić	4	3
8	(Slovakia) K Beck	6	6
(Kazakhstan) E Korolev	6^{4}	7^{9}	2
6	(Germany) D Brown	7^{7}	6^{7}	6

Semifinals
8	(Slovakia) K Beck	6^{6}	4
6	(Germany) D Brown	7^{8}	6

=== Bottom half ===
First round
7	(Germany) C-M Stebe	4	6	6^{9}
(France) P-H Herbert	6	4	7^{11}
(Belgium) Y Mertens	2	6^{4}
(Czech Republic) J Hernych	6	7^{7}
Q	(Croatia) A Pavić	3	6^{8}
(Belgium) N Desein	6	7^{10}
(Bosnia and Herzegovina) D Džumhur	5	6^{3}
4	(France) A Mannarino	7	7^{7}
5	(Germany) S Greul	7^{7}	5	7^{7}
(Poland) M Przysiężny	6^{2}	7	6^{4}
Q	(Croatia) M Draganja	5	4
(Croatia) N Mektić	7	6
(Netherlands) M Middelkoop	3	4
(Czech Republic) J Mertl	6	6
WC	(Bosnia and Herzegovina) I Gorčić	4	6^{4}
2	(France) J Ouanna	6	7^{7}

Second round
(France) P-H Herbert	4	6	7
(Czech Republic) J Hernych	6	4	5
(Belgium) N Desein	6^{4}	7	4
4	(France) A Mannarino	7^{7}	5	6
5	(Germany) S Greul	4	6^{4}
(Croatia) N Mektić	6	7^{7}
(Czech Republic) J Mertl	6	7^{9}
2	(France) J Ouanna	4	6^{7}

Quarterfinals
(France) P-H Herbert	7^{13}	6^{5}	6^{7}
4	(France) A Mannarino	6^{11}	7^{7}	7^{9}
(Croatia) N Mektić	6	6
(Czech Republic) J Mertl	2	4

Semifinals
4	(France) A Mannarino	6	6
(Croatia) N Mektić	2	4
