= 2009 Open Costa Adeje – Isla de Tenerife =

Tennis tournament

- Date: April 27 – March 03
- Edition: 1st
- Location: Tenerife, Spain

Champions

Singles
- (Switzerland) Marco Chiudinelli

Doubles
- (Germany) Philipp Petzschner / (Austria) Alexander Peya
Open Costa Adeje – Isla de Tenerife

The 2009 Open Costa Adeje – Isla de tenerife was a professional tennis tournament played on hard courts. It was part of the 2009 ATP Challenger Tour. It took place in Tenerife, Spain, between April 27 and March 3, 2009.

== Singles entrants ==
=== Seeds ===
Nationality	Player	Ranking*	Seeding
KOR	Lu Yen-hsun	63	1
GER	Philipp Petzschner	69	2
ESP	Iván Navarro	90	3
ESP	Miguel Ángel López Jaén	173	4
AUT	Alexander Peya	187	5
AUS	Brydan Klein	190	6
USA	Todd Widom	209	7
ITA	Paolo Lorenzi	211	8

- Rankings are as of April 20, 2009.

=== Other entrants ===
The following players received wildcards into the singles main draw:

- (Spain) Javier Martí
- (Spain) Javier Padilla
- (Spain) Narciso Reyes-Rygh
- (Spain) Amador Romero-Torres

The following players received entry from the qualifying draw:

- (Switzerland) Marco Chiudinelli
- (Australia) Matthew Ebden
- (France) Jean-Noel Insausti
- (Sweden) Filip Prpic

== Champions ==
=== Men's singles ===
(Switzerland) Marco Chiudinelli def. (Italy) Paolo Lorenzi, 6–3, 6–4

=== Men's doubles ===
(Germany) Philipp Petzschner / (Austria) Alexander Peya def. (United Kingdom) James Auckland / (United Kingdom) Joshua Goodall, 6–2, 3–6, [10–4]
