= 2009 Open Costa Adeje – Isla de Tenerife – Singles =

Isla de Tenerife – Singles
- 2009 Open Costa Adeje – Isla de Tenerife

Final
- Champion: (Switzerland) Marco Chiudinelli
- Runner-up: (Italy) Paolo Lorenzi
- Score: 6–3, 6–4

Events
Singles	Doubles
Open Costa Adeje – Isla de Tenerife

Marco Chiudinelli won in the final 6–3, 6–4, against Paolo Lorenzi.

== Seeds ==
1. (South Korea) Lu Yen-hsun (quarterfinals)
2. (Germany) Philipp Petzschner (semifinals)
3. (Spain) Iván Navarro (quarterfinals)
4. (Spain) Miguel Ángel López Jaén (first round)
5. (Austria) Alexander Peya (first round)
6. (Australia) Brydan Klein (first round)
7. (United States) Todd Widom (first round)
8. (Italy) Paolo Lorenzi (final)

== Draw ==
=== Key ===
- Q = Qualifier
- WC = Wild card
- LL = Lucky loser
- Alt = Alternate
- ITF = ITF entry
- PR = Protected ranking
- SR = Special ranking
- SE = Special exempt
- JE = Junior exempt
- JR = Junior Accelerator Programme entrant
- CO = College Accelerator Programme entrant
- NG = Next Gen Accelerator Program entrant
- w/o = Walkover
- r = Retired
- d = Defaulted

=== Final four ===
Semifinals
Q	(Switzerland) Marco Chiudinelli	6	6
3	(Spain) Iván Navarro	1	2
8	(Italy) Paolo Lorenzi	6	3	6
2	(Germany) Philipp Petzschner	1	6	4

Final
Q	(Switzerland) Marco Chiudinelli	6	6
8	(Italy) Paolo Lorenzi	3	4

=== Top half ===
First round
1	(Chinese Taipei) Y-h Lu	6	6
(United Kingdom) J Goodall	2	1
(South Africa) I van der Merwe	2	3
(Germany) D Meffert	6	6
Q	(Switzerland) M Chiudinelli	6	7
(Australia) J Sirianni	1	5
(Italy) A Stoppini	6	7
7	(United States) T Widom	4	5
3	(Spain) I Navarro	7	6
(Ukraine) S Bubka	6^{3}	3
(Australia) R Smeets	6	6
WC	(Spain) J Marti	1	4
(Australia) M Matosevic	3	7	4
(Sweden) B Rehnquist	6	6^{4}	6
(Spain) C Poch-Gradin	7	3	6
6	(Australia) B Klein	6^{5}	6	4

Second round
1	(Chinese Taipei) Y-h Lu	7	6
(Germany) D Meffert	6^{0}	4
Q	(Switzerland) M Chiudinelli	6	6
(Italy) A Stoppini	1	4
3	(Spain) I Navarro	4	6	6
(Australia) R Smeets	6	2	3
(Sweden) B Rehnquist	7	6
(Spain) C Poch-Gradin	6^{3}	3

Quarterfinals
1	(Chinese Taipei) Y-h Lu	1	0	r
Q	(Switzerland) M Chiudinelli	6	4
3	(Spain) I Navarro	6	4	6
(Sweden) B Rehnquist	3	6	4

Semifinals
Q	(Switzerland) M Chiudinelli	6	6
3	(Spain) I Navarro	1	2

=== Bottom half ===
First round
8	(Italy) P Lorenzi	7	7
(Republic of Ireland) C Niland	6^{3}	5
WC	(Spain) J Padilla	4	3
(Ukraine) I Marchenko	6	6
Q	(Australia) M Ebden	6	6
WC	(Spain) N Reyes-Rygh	0	1
(Switzerland) M Lammer	6	4	6
4	(Spain) MÁ López Jaén	3	6	0
5	(Austria) A Peya	2	2
(United States) M Yani	6	6
Q	(France) J-N Insausti	6	7
WC	(Spain) A Romero-Torres	2	5
(Spain) F Vicente	6^{2}	0
Q	(Sweden) F Prpic	7	6
(Belgium) Y Mertens	4	3
2	(Germany) P Petzschner	6	6

Second round
8	(Italy) P Lorenzi	7	6
(Ukraine) I Marchenko	3	5
Q	(Australia) M Ebden	4	6^{9}
(Switzerland) M Lammer	6	7
(United States) M Yani	7	2	6
Q	(France) J-N Insausti	5	6	4
Q	(Sweden) F Prpic	6	2	4
2	(Germany) P Petzschner	4	6	6

Quarterfinals
8	(Italy) P Lorenzi	7	6
(Switzerland) M Lammer	6^{5}	1
(United States) M Yani	1	7	3
2	(Germany) P Petzschner	6	6^{3}	6

Semifinals
8	(Italy) P Lorenzi	6	3	6
2	(Germany) P Petzschner	1	6	4
