= 2009 Open Costa Adeje – Isla de Tenerife – Doubles =

Isla de Tenerife – Doubles
- 2009 Open Costa Adeje – Isla de Tenerife

Final
- Champion: (Germany) Philipp Petzschner; (Austria) Alexander Peya
- Runner-up: (United Kingdom) James Auckland; (United Kingdom) Joshua Goodall
- Score: 6–2, 3–6, [10–4]

Events
Singles	Doubles
← 2008 ·	Open Costa Adeje – Isla de Tenerife	· 2010 →

Philipp Petzschner and Alexander Peya won in the final 6–2, 3–6, [10–4], against James Auckland and Joshua Goodall.

== Seeds ==
1. (Germany) Philipp Petzschner / (Austria) Alexander Peya (champions)
2. (United States) Todd Widom / (United States) Michael Yani (quarterfinals)
3. (United Kingdom) James Auckland / (United Kingdom) Joshua Goodall (finals)
4. (Ukraine) Sergey Bubka / (Ukraine) Denys Molchanov (first round)

== Draw ==
=== Key ===
- Q = Qualifier
- WC = Wild card
- LL = Lucky loser
- Alt = Alternate
- ITF = ITF entry
- PR = Protected ranking
- SR = Special ranking
- SE = Special exempt
- JE = Junior exempt
- JR = Junior Accelerator Programme entrant
- CO = College Accelerator Programme entrant
- NG = Next Gen Accelerator Program entrant
- w/o = Walkover
- r = Retired
- d = Defaulted

=== Draw ===
First round

Quarterfinals

Semifinals

Finals

1
- (Germany) P Petzschner
- (Austria) A Peya
6
6

- (India) P Raja
- (South Africa) I van der Merwe
2
0

1
- (Germany) P Petzschner
- (Austria) A Peya
6
6

- (Sweden) F Prpic
- (Sweden) B Rehnquist
6
6

- (Sweden) F Prpic
- (Sweden) B Rehnquist
1

- (Australia) M Ebden
- (Australia) B Klein
4
3

1
- (Germany) P Petzschner
- (Austria) A Peya
6
6

4
- (Ukraine) S Bubka
- (Ukraine) D Molchanov
6^{1}
6^{5}

- (Australia) J Sirianni
- (Australia) R Smeets
2
1

- (Australia) J Sirianni
- (Australia) R Smeets
7
7

- (Australia) J Sirianni
- (Australia) R Smeets
7
6

WC
(Spain) I Arenas-Gualda
(Spain) J Padilla
1
6^{3}

- (Spain) MÁ López Jaén
- (Spain) I Navarro
5
2

- (Spain) MÁ López Jaén
- (Spain) I Navarro
6
7

1
- (Germany) P Petzschner
- (Austria) A Peya
6
3
[14]

- (United Kingdom) J Delgado
- (Germany) D Meffert
5
6
[13]

3
- (United Kingdom) J Auckland
- (United Kingdom) J Goodall
2
6
[10]

- (Italy) P Lorenzi
- (Italy) A Stoppini
7
5
[11]

- (United Kingdom) J Delgado
- (Germany) D Meffert
6^{3}
6^{6}

WC
- (Spain) J Checa Calvo
6^{4}
4

3
- (United Kingdom) J Auckland
- (United Kingdom) J Goodall
7
7

3
- (United Kingdom) J Auckland
- (United Kingdom) J Goodall
7
6

3
- (United Kingdom) J Auckland
- (United Kingdom) J Goodall
7
7

- (France) O Charroin
- (Latvia) D Pavlovs
3
3

- (Spain) C Poch-Gradin
- (Spain) F Vicente
5
5

- (Spain) C Poch-Gradin
- (Spain) F Vicente
6
6

- (Spain) C Poch-Gradin
- (Spain) F Vicente
6
6

WC
(Belgium) Y Mertens
(Russia) N Nesterov
2
4

2
- (United States) T Widom
- (United States) M Yani
1
2

2
- (United States) T Widom
- (United States) M Yani
6
6
