= 2010 BH Telecom Indoors =

- Date: March 8 – March 14
- Edition: 8th
- Location: Sarajevo, Bosnia and Herzegovina

Champions

Singles
- (France) Édouard Roger-Vasselin

Doubles
- (France) Nicolas Mahut / (France) Édouard Roger-Vasselin
← 2009 ·	BH Telecom Indoors	· 2011 →

The 2010 BH Telecom Indoors was a professional tennis tournament played on indoor hard courts. It was part of the 2010 ATP Challenger Tour. It took place in Sarajevo, Bosnia and Herzegovina between 8 and 14 March 2010.

== ATP entrants ==
=== Seeds ===
Nationality	Player	Ranking*	Seeding
SVK	Karol Beck	88	1
TUR	Marsel İlhan	121	2
SUI	Stéphane Bohli	141	3
CZE	Jan Hernych	145	4
BEL	Kristof Vliegen	149	5
GBR	Alex Bogdanovic	151	6
FRA	Édouard Roger-Vasselin	155	7
CZE	Lukáš Rosol	160	8

- Rankings are as of March 1, 2010.

=== Other entrants ===
The following players received wildcards into the singles main draw:

- (Bosnia and Herzegovina) Mirza Bašić
- (Bosnia and Herzegovina) Tomislav Brkić
- (Bosnia and Herzegovina) Ismar Gorčić
- (Bosnia and Herzegovina) Aldin Šetkić

The following players received entry from the qualifying draw:

- (Russia) Evgeny Donskoy
- (Croatia) Mislav Hižak
- (Netherlands) Matwé Middelkoop
- (Sweden) Filip Prpic

== Champions ==
=== Singles ===
(France) Édouard Roger-Vasselin def. (Slovakia) Karol Beck, 6–7(5), 6–3, 1–0, ret.

=== Doubles ===
(France) Nicolas Mahut / (France) Édouard Roger-Vasselin def. (Croatia) Ivan Dodig / (Czech Republic) Lukáš Rosol, 7–6(6), 6–7(7), [10–5]
