= Sarajevo Open =

Sarajevo Open may refer to:

- BH Telecom Indoors, a tennis tournament in Sarajevo
- Sarajevo Open (figure skating), a figure skating competition in Sarajevo
- Sarajevo Open (sitting volleyball), a sitting volleyball tournament competition in Sarajevo
