= 2012 BH Telecom Indoors =

- Date: 12–18 March
- Edition: 10th
- Surface: Hard (indoor)
- Location: Sarajevo, Bosnia and Herzegovina

Champions

Singles
- (Czech Republic) Jan Hernych

Doubles
- (Germany) Dustin Brown / (United Kingdom) Jonathan Marray
- BH Telecom Indoors

The 2012 BH Telecom Indoors was a professional tennis tournament played on hard courts. It was the tenth edition of the tournament which was part of the 2012 ATP Challenger Tour. It took place in Sarajevo, Bosnia and Herzegovina between 12 and 18 March 2012.

== ATP entrants ==
=== Seeds ===
Country	Player	Rank^{1}	Seed
GER	Andreas Beck	96	1
GER	Michael Berrer	116	2
GER	Daniel Brands	131	3
RUS	Alexander Kudryavtsev	148	4
GER	Dustin Brown	177	5
SRB	Dušan Lajović	199	6
AUT	Martin Fischer	200	7
LTU	Laurynas Grigelis	201	8

- ^{1} Rankings are as of March 5, 2012.

=== Other entrants ===
The following players received wildcards into the singles main draw:

- (Bosnia and Herzegovina) Tomislav Brkić
- (Serbia) Marko Djokovic
- (Bosnia and Herzegovina) Damir Džumhur
- (Bosnia and Herzegovina) Aldin Šetkić

The following players received entry from the qualifying draw:

- (Serbia) Nikola Ćaćić
- (Bosnia and Herzegovina) Ismar Gorčić
- (Kazakhstan) Evgeny Korolev
- (Poland) Michał Przysiężny

== Champions ==
=== Singles ===
- (Czech Republic) Jan Hernych def. (Czech Republic) Jan Mertl, 6–3, 3–6, 7–6^{(7–5)}

=== Doubles ===
- (Germany) Dustin Brown / (United Kingdom) Jonathan Marray def. (Slovakia) Michal Mertiňák / (Slovakia) Igor Zelenay, 7–6^{(7–2)}, 2–6, [11–9]
