= Open Costa Adeje – Isla de Tenerife =

Defunct tennis tournament
- Location: Adeje, Santa Cruz de Tenerife, Spain
- Category: ATP Challenger Tour
- Surface: Hard
- Draw: 32S/32Q/16D
- Prize money: €30,000+H
- Website: www.tenis canarias.com

The Open Costa Adeje – Isla de Tenerife was a professional tennis tournament played on outdoor hard courts. It was part of the ATP Challenger Tour. It was held in Adeje, Tenerife, Spain, only in 2009.

== Past finals ==
=== Singles ===
Year	Champion	Runner-up	Score
2009	(Switzerland) Marco Chiudinelli	(Italy) Paolo Lorenzi	6–3, 6–4

=== Doubles ===
Year	Champions	Runners-up	Score
2009	(Germany) Philipp Petzschner (Austria) Alexander Peya	(United Kingdom) James Auckland (United Kingdom) Joshua Goodall	6–2, 3–6, 10–4
