= 2011 BH Telecom Indoors – Singles =

Singles
- 2011 BH Telecom Indoors

Final
- Champion: (Bosnia and Herzegovina) Amer Delić
- Runner-up: (Slovakia) Karol Beck
- Score: walkover

Events
Singles	Doubles
- BH Telecom Indoors

Édouard Roger-Vasselin was the defending champion; however, he lost to Karol Beck in the quarterfinals.
Beck reached the final, but he withdrew before his match against Amer Delić.

== Seeds ==
1. (Bulgaria) Grigor Dimitrov (first round)
2. (Slovenia) Blaž Kavčič (second round)
3. (France) Nicolas Mahut (semifinals)
4. (Russia) Dmitry Tursunov (quarterfinals)
5. (France) Édouard Roger-Vasselin (quarterfinals)
6. (Germany) Andreas Beck (second round)
7. (Republic of Ireland) Conor Niland (withdrew)
8. (Slovenia) Grega Žemlja (second round)

== Draw ==
Key

- Q = Qualifier
- WC = Wild card
- LL = Lucky loser
- Alt = Alternate
- ITF = ITF entry
- PR = Protected ranking
- SR = Special ranking
- SE = Special exempt
- JE = Junior exempt
- JR = Junior Accelerator Programme entrant
- CO = College Accelerator Programme entrant
- NG = Next Gen Accelerator Program entrant
- w/o = Walkover
- r = Retired
- d = Defaulted

=== Finals ===
Semifinals
(Slovakia) Karol Beck	6	6
WC	(Bosnia and Herzegovina) Mirza Bašić	3	4
3	(France) Nicolas Mahut	4	6	6^{8}
WC	(Bosnia and Herzegovina) Amer Delić	6	1	7

Final
(Slovakia) Karol Beck	w/o
WC	(Bosnia and Herzegovina) Amer Delić

=== Top half ===
First round
1	(Bulgaria) G Dimitrov	6^{3}	4
(Slovakia) K Beck	7	6
Q	(Netherlands) M Middelkoop	6^{7}	6	6
(Australia) J Millman	7	3	1
LL	(Croatia) Mislav Hižak	6	1	6^{8}
(Croatia) A Veić	3	6	7
(Germany) D Kindlmann	3	4
5	(France) É Roger-Vasselin	6	6
4	(Russia) D Tursunov	4	7	2
(Netherlands) I Sijsling	6	6	1^{r}
(Slovakia) A Martin	6	6
(Australia) B Klein	3	2
Q	(Croatia) R Karanušić	3	3
WC	(Bosnia and Herzegovina) M Bašić	6	6
Q	(Croatia) Ante Pavić	3	6	3
8	(Slovenia) G Žemlja	6	1	6

Second round
(Slovakia) K Beck	4	7	6
Q	(Netherlands) M Middelkoop	6	6^{5}	3
(Croatia) A Veić	1	2
5	(France) É Roger-Vasselin	6	6
4	(Russia) D Tursunov	3	6	6
(Slovakia) A Martin	6	3	2
WC	(Bosnia and Herzegovina) M Bašić	3	7	6
8	(Slovenia) G Žemlja	6	6^{4}	4

Quarterfinals
(Slovakia) K Beck	7	7
5	(France) É Roger-Vasselin	6^{1}	6^{6}
4	(Russia) D Tursunov	6^{11}	6^{1}
WC	(Bosnia and Herzegovina) M Bašić	7	7

Semifinals
(Slovakia) K Beck	6	6
WC	(Bosnia and Herzegovina) M Bašić	3	4

=== Bottom half ===
First round
LL	(Croatia) Dino Marcan	6^{5}	3
(Czech Republic) J Hernych	7	6
(Serbia) I Bozoljac	6	6
Q	(Switzerland) A Sadecky	4	4
(Spain) R Bautista-Agut	6	6
(United Kingdom) J Ward	3	3
(Denmark) F Nielsen	5	5
3	(France) N Mahut	7	7
6	(Germany) A Beck	7	7
(Russia) K Kravchuk	6^{4}	5
(Estonia) J Zopp	6^{5}	4
WC	(Bosnia and Herzegovina) A Delić	7	6
WC	(Bosnia and Herzegovina) Franjo Raspudić	2	6^{3}
(Austria) M Fischer	6	7
WC	(Bosnia and Herzegovina) T Brkić	4	6^{3}
2	(Slovenia) B Kavčič	6	7

Second round
(Czech Republic) J Hernych	6	6
(Serbia) I Bozoljac	3	4
(Spain) R Bautista-Agut	4	6	2
3	(France) N Mahut	6	3	6
6	(Germany) A Beck	6^{4}	7	6^{3}
WC	(Bosnia and Herzegovina) A Delić	7	6^{10}	7
(Austria) M Fischer	6	7
2	(Slovenia) B Kavčič	1	6^{5}

Quarterfinals
(Czech Republic) J Hernych	2	6^{9}
3	(France) N Mahut	6	7
WC	(Bosnia and Herzegovina) A Delić	7	6
(Austria) M Fischer	6^{2}	4

Semifinals
3	(France) N Mahut	4	6	6^{8}
WC	(Bosnia and Herzegovina) A Delić	6	1	7
