= Dawid Olejniczak =

Polish tennis player

- Country (sports): Poland
- Residence: Poland
- Born: 1 March 1983 (age 42); Łódź, Poland
- Plays: Right-handed
- Prize money: $186,155

Singles
- Career record: 3–5
- Career titles: 0
- Highest ranking: No. 185 (11 August 2008)

Grand Slam singles results
- Australian Open: Q3 (2006)
- French Open: Q3 (2008)
- Wimbledon: 1R (2008)
- US Open: Q1 (2008)

Doubles
- Career record: 1–4
- Career titles: 0
- Highest ranking: No. 206 (17 July 2006)
- Last updated on: 23 June 2021.

Dawid Olejniczak (Polish pronunciation: [ˈdavit ɔlɛjˈɲit͡ʂak]; born March 1, 1983, in Łódź) is a Polish former tennis player.

Olejniczak has a career-high ATP singles ranking of World No. 185, achieved on 11 August 2008. He also has a career-high ATP doubles ranking of World No. 206, achieved on 17 July 2006.

== 2008 ==
In June, Olejniczak qualified in singles for the 2008 Wimbledon Championships after defeating World No. 184 Lukáš Rosol, No. 158 Aisam Qureshi, and Rik de Voest respectively in the three qualifying rounds.

== ATP Challenger and ITF Futures finals ==
=== Singles: 15 (8–7) ===
Legend ATP Challenger (1–1) ITF Futures (7–6)	Finals by surface Hard (4–2) Clay (3–4) Grass (0–0) Carpet (1–1)

Result	W–L	Date	Tournament	Tier	Surface	Opponent	Score
Win	1–0	Oct 2004	Mexico F12, Torreón	Futures	Hard	(Israel) Michael Kogan	7–5, 6–2
Loss	1–1	Jun 2005	Poland F3, Koszalin	Futures	Clay	(Poland) Filip Urban	2–6, 7–6^{(7–4)}, 4–6
Loss	1–2	Aug 2005	Poland F5, Bełchatów	Futures	Clay	(Austria) Herbert Wiltschnig	6–1, 1–6, 0–6
Win	2–2	Sep 2005	Poland F7, Szczecin	Futures	Clay	(Chile) Felipe Parada	6–2, 6–2
Win	3–2	Oct 2005	Mexico F13, Torreón	Futures	Hard	(Mexico) Antonio Ruiz-Rosales	7–5, 6–2
Loss	3–3	Jun 2006	Poland F8, Gdynia	Futures	Clay	(France) Jordane Doble	0–3 ret.
Win	4–3	May 2007	Poland F2, Zabrze	Futures	Clay	(France) Jordane Doble	7–6^{(7–4)}, 7–6^{(7–4)}
Loss	4–4	Jun 2007	Poland F3, Kraków	Futures	Clay	(France) Éric Prodon	5–7, 2–6
Win	5–4	Jun 2007	Poland F4, Koszalin	Futures	Clay	(Kuwait) Mohammad Ghareeb	7–6^{(7–5)}, 2–6, 6–4
Loss	5–5	Oct 2007	Great Britain F19, Jersey	Futures	Hard	(Denmark) Frederik Nielsen	4–6, 7–6^{(8–6)}, 4–6
Loss	5–6	Nov 2007	Puebla, Mexico	Challenger	Hard	(Argentina) Leonardo Mayer	1–6, 4–6
Win	6–6	Mar 2008	Great Britain F5, St Peter	Futures	Hard	(Denmark) Martin Pedersen	6–2, 6–3
Win	7–6	Apr 2008	Mexico City, Mexico	Challenger	Hard	(United States) Sam Warburg	6–4, 6–3
Loss	7–7	Nov 2009	Czech Republic F4, Rožnov pod Radhoštěm	Futures	Carpet	(Czech Republic) Jan Mertl	4–6, 5–7
Win	8–7	Feb 2010	Bosnia & Herzegovina F1, Sarajevo	Futures	Carpet	(Bosnia and Herzegovina) Aldin Šetkić	6–4, 7–5

=== Doubles: 26 (17–9) ===
Legend ATP Challenger (5–1) ITF Futures (12–8)	Finals by surface Hard (5–4) Clay (10–4) Grass (0–0) Carpet (2–1)

Result	W–L	Date	Tournament	Tier	Surface	Partner	Opponents	Score
Loss	0–1	Sep 2002	Poland F7, Łódź	Futures	Clay	(Poland) Kamil Lewandowicz	(Poland) Marcin Golab (Poland) Marcin Matkowski	3–6, 4–6
Win	1–1	Jun 2004	Poland F2, Koszalin	Futures	Clay	(Poland) Radoslav Nijaki	(Czech Republic) Jacob Melskens (Italy) Federico Torresi	6–3, 6–7^{(4–7)}, 6–2
Loss	1–2	Sep 2004	Poland F6, Wrocław	Futures	Clay	(Poland) Piotr Olechowski	(Poland) Marcin Golab (Poland) Krzysztof Kwinta	6–7^{(4–7)}, 6–7^{(2–7)}
Loss	1–3	Nov 2004	Mexico F16, León	Futures	Hard	(Poland) Piotr Szczepanik	(Mexico) Daniel Langre (Mexico) Víctor Romero	6–7^{(4–7)}, 5–7
Win	2–3	May 2005	Poland F1, Gdynia	Futures	Clay	(Poland) Maciej Diłaj	(Poland) Robert Godlewski (Poland) Przemyslaw Stec	6–0, 6–1
Win	3–3	May 2005	Poland F2, Kędzierzyn-Koźle	Futures	Clay	(Poland) Maciej Diłaj	(Spain) Jordi Marse-Vidri (Spain) Alberto Soriano-Maldonado	7–6^{(7–4)}, 6–2
Win	4–3	Jun 2005	Poland F3, Koszalin	Futures	Clay	(Poland) Maciej Diłaj	(Poland) Jakub Nijaki (Poland) Filip Urban	7–5, 6–2
Win	5–3	Jun 2005	Poland F4, Bytom	Futures	Clay	(Poland) Maciej Diłaj	(Czech Republic) Jakub Hasek (Czech Republic) Josef Neštický	1–0 ret.
Loss	5–4	Aug 2005	Poland F5, Bełchatów	Futures	Clay	(Poland) Maciej Diłaj	(Chile) Felipe Parada (Poland) Tomasz Bednarek	2–6, 4–6
Win	6–4	Sep 2005	Poland F7, Szczecin	Futures	Clay	(Poland) Maciej Diłaj	(Chile) Felipe Parada (Germany) Benedikt Stronk	6–3, 6–0
Loss	6–5	Sep 2005	Poland F8, Gliwice	Futures	Clay	(Poland) Maciej Diłaj	(Czech Republic) Daniel Lustig (Slovakia) Michal Varsanyi	3–6, 6–7^{(5–7)}
Win	7–5	Oct 2005	Mexico F13, Torreón	Futures	Hard	(Poland) Michal Domanski	(Mexico) Bruno Echagaray (Mexico) Carlos Palencia	6–4, 6–4
Win	8–5	Oct 2005	Mexico F16, Mazatlán	Futures	Hard	(United Kingdom) Richard Irwin	(Mexico) Bruno Echagaray (Mexico) Daniel Langre	7–6^{(7–4)}, 6–0
Win	9–5	Apr 2006	San Luis Potosí, Mexico	Challenger	Clay	(Mexico) Daniel Garza	(Mexico) Hector Almada (Mexico) Víctor Romero	6–2, 6–2
Loss	9–6	Apr 2006	León, Mexico	Challenger	Hard	(Germany) Alexander Satschko	(Mexico) Juan Manuel Elizondo (Mexico) Miguel Gallardo Valles	3–6, 4–6
Win	10–6	Jun 2006	Poland F8, Gdynia	Futures	Clay	(Poland) Filip Urban	(Poland) Tomasz Bednarek (Netherlands) Rick Schalkers	7–6^{(7–5)}, 6–3
Loss	10–7	Oct 2006	Great Britain F16, Glasgow	Futures	Hard	(Germany) Philipp Marx	(United Kingdom) Ross Hutchins (United Kingdom) Josh Goodall	6–7^{(2–7)}, 5–7
Loss	10–8	Oct 2007	France F16, Nevers	Futures	Hard	(Australia) Raphael Durek	(France) Jérôme Inzerillo (France) Josselin Ouanna	6–1, 6–7^{(4–7)}, [10–12]
Win	11–8	Oct 2007	Great Britain F19, Jersey	Futures	Hard	(Australia) Raphael Durek	(United Kingdom) David Brewer (United Kingdom) Ian Flanagan	6–2, 6–0
Win	12–8	Nov 2007	Puebla, Mexico	Challenger	Hard	(Australia) Raphael Durek	(Mexico) Santiago González (Mexico) Bruno Echagaray	6–2, 7–6^{(8–6)}
Win	13–8	May 2008	Aarhus, Denmark	Challenger	Clay	(Netherlands Antilles) Jean-Julien Rojer	(Denmark) Martin Pedersen (Denmark) Frederik Nielsen	7–6^{(7–4)}, 2–6, [10–8]
Win	14–8	Sep 2008	Szczecin, Poland	Challenger	Clay	(Spain) David Marrero	(Poland) Łukasz Kubot (Austria) Oliver Marach	7–6^{(7–4)}, 6–3
Win	15–8	Mar 2009	Sarajevo, Bosnia & Herzegovina	Challenger	Hard	(Russia) Konstantin Kravchuk	(United Kingdom) James Auckland (Netherlands) Rogier Wassen	6–2, 3–6, [10–7]
Loss	15–9	Oct 2009	Belarus F1, Minsk	Futures	Carpet	(Poland) Michał Przysiężny	(Belarus) Sergey Betov (Belarus) Nikolai Fidirko	6–7^{(3–7)}, 6–7^{(3–7)}
Win	16–9	Nov 2009	Czech Republic F4, Rožnov pod Radhoštěm	Futures	Carpet	(Russia) Denis Matsukevich	(Czech Republic) Jaroslav Pospíšil (Czech Republic) Pavel Šnobel	6–3, 6–4
Win	17–9	Mar 2010	Switzerland F1, Taverne	Futures	Carpet	(Poland) Marcin Gawron	(France) Jeremy Blandin (Switzerland) Alexander Sadecky	6–1, 7–6^{(7–5)}
