= James Auckland =

British tennis player

- Country (sports): Great Britain
- Residence: London, England
- Born: 1 April 1980 (age 45); Norwich, England
- Turned pro: 1999
- Retired: 2009
- Plays: Right-handed
- Prize money: $260,610

Singles
- Career record: 2–1 (ATP Tour and Grand Slam-level, and in Davis Cup)
- Career titles: 0
- Highest ranking: No. 282 (6 February 2006)

Grand Slam singles results
- Australian Open: Q1 (2006)
- Wimbledon: Q1 (2003, 2005, 2006)

Doubles
- Career record: 20–37 (ATP Tour and Grand Slam-level, and in Davis Cup)
- Career titles: 0
- Highest ranking: No. 57 (9 April 2007)

Grand Slam doubles results
- Australian Open: 2R (2007)
- French Open: 2R (2006)
- Wimbledon: 3R (2006)
- US Open: 1R (2006, 2007)

Grand Slam mixed doubles results
- Wimbledon: 2R (2006, 2007, 2009)
- Last updated on: 27 June 2021.

James Auckland (born 1 April 1980) is a British former professional tennis player.

His highest ATP singles ranking was 282nd, which he reached on 6 February 2006. While his career high in doubles was at 57 set at 9 April 2007.

Auckland was given a wildcard into the main draw of the men's singles at 2002 Wimbledon, but was forced to withdraw due to injury. His place was taken by lucky loser, Denis Golovanov.

Auckland played for the Kansas City Explorers of World TeamTennis during the 2008 season and for the Boston Lobsters in 2009.

In April 2013, James joined tennis coaching and management company Premier Tennis as Director of Tennis, where he designs and oversees a variety of coaching programmes and takes responsibility for coach development and training.

== Performance timeline ==
Key
W	F	SF	QF	#R	RR	Q#	DNQ	A	NH

(W) winner; (F) finalist; (SF) semifinalist; (QF) quarterfinalist; (#R) rounds 4, 3, 2, 1; (RR) round-robin stage; (Q#) qualification round; (DNQ) did not qualify; (A) absent; (NH) not held; (SR) strike rate (events won / competed); (W–L) win–loss record.

=== Doubles ===
Tournament	2003	2004	2005	2006	2007	2008	2009	SR	W–L	Win %
Grand Slam tournaments
Australian Open	A	A	A	A	2R	1R	A	0 / 2	1–2	33%
French Open	A	A	A	2R	1R	A	A	0 / 2	1–2	33%
Wimbledon	1R	1R	2R	3R	2R	1R	1R	0 / 7	4–7	36%
US Open	A	A	A	1R	1R	A	A	0 / 2	0–2	0%
Win–loss	0–1	0–1	1–1	3–3	2–4	0–2	0–1	0 /13	6–13	32%

== ATP Career Finals ==
=== Doubles: 1 (1 runner-up) ===
Legend (doubles) Grand Slam (0–0) ATP World Tour Finals (0–0) ATP Masters Series (0–0) ATP Championship Series (0–0) ATP World Series (0–1)	Finals by surface Hard (0–1) Clay (0–0) Grass (0–0) Carpet (0–0)	Finals by setting Outdoor (0–1) Indoor (0–0)

Result	W–L	Date	Tournament	Tier	Surface	Partner	Opponents	Score
Loss	0–1	Feb 2007	Delray Beach, United States	International Series	Hard	(Australia) Stephen Huss	(United States) Hugo Armando (Belgium) Xavier Malisse	3–6, 7–6^{(7–4)}, [5–10]

== ATP Challenger and ITF Futures finals ==
=== Singles: 5 (1–4) ===
Legend ATP Challenger (0–0) ITF Futures (1–4)	Finals by surface Hard (1–4) Clay (0–0) Grass (0–0) Carpet (0–0)

Result	W–L	Date	Tournament	Tier	Surface	Opponent	Score
Loss	0–1	Aug 2001	Nigeria F1, Lagos	Futures	Hard	(France) M-S Drame	6–7^{(5–7)}, 3–6
Win	1–1	Mar 2004	Nigeria F2, Benin City	Futures	Hard	(Italy) Diego Álvarez	6–1, 5–7, 7–5
Loss	1–2	Aug 2004	Great Britain F4, Hampstead	Futures	Hard	(France) Nicolas Tourte	3–6, 7–6^{(7–3)}, 1–6
Loss	1–3	May 2005	Korea F1, Seogwipo	Futures	Hard	(Australia) Robert Smeets	5–7, 3–6
Loss	1–4	Mar 2006	Great Britain F3, Sunderland	Futures	Hard	(United Kingdom) Martin Lee	7–6^{(7–5)}, 1–6, 2–6

=== Doubles: 29 (8–21) ===
Legend ATP Challenger (4–13) ITF Futures (4–8)	Finals by surface Hard (4–14) Clay (2–3) Grass (0–2) Carpet (2–2)

Result	W–L	Date	Tournament	Tier	Surface	Partner	Opponents	Score
Win	1–0	Sep 2000	Great Britain F8, Sunderland	Futures	Hard	(United Kingdom) Barry Fulcher	(United Kingdom) Ben Haran (United Kingdom) Neil Watts	5^{5}–4, 4–2, 4^{5}–5, 4–1
Loss	1–1	Oct 2000	Great Britain F11, Leeds	Futures	Hard	(United Kingdom) Barry Fulcher	(United Kingdom) James Nelson (United Kingdom) Lee Childs	4^{4}–5, 3–5, 4–2, 2–4
Loss	1–2	Aug 2001	Nigeria F2, Lagos	Futures	Hard	(United Kingdom) Barry Fulcher	(Mauritius) J-M Bourgault (South Africa) W-P Meyer	4–6, 2–6
Loss	1–3	Apr 2002	China F1, Kunming	Futures	Hard	(United Kingdom) Simon Dickson	(Thailand) Danai Udomchoke (Chinese Taipei) Jimmy Wang	7–5, 3–6, 2–6
Loss	1–4	May 2003	Jamaica F3, Montego Bay	Futures	Hard	(South Africa) Johan Du Randt	(South Africa) Andrew Anderson (South Africa) W-P Meyer	4–6, 4–6
Win	2–4	May 2003	Jamaica F4, Montego Bay	Futures	Hard	(South Africa) Nenad Toroman	(South Africa) Andrew Anderson (South Africa) W-P Meyer	6–3, 3–6, 6–4
Loss	2–5	Aug 2003	Brazil F5, Fortaleza	Futures	Hard	(Chile) Paul Capdeville	(Brazil) Alexandre Bonatto (Brazil) Felipe Lemos	4–6, 7–6^{(7–5)}, 6–7^{(0–7)}
Loss	2–6	Feb 2004	Bahrain F1, Manama	Futures	Hard	(Australia) Rameez Junaid	(Switzerland) Marco Chiudinelli (Italy) Uros Vico	4–6, 1–6
Win	3–6	May 2004	Great Britain F1, Bournemouth	Futures	Clay	(United States) Thomas Blake	(United Kingdom) Oliver Freelove (United Kingdom) David Sherwood	6–4, 6–3
Loss	3–7	Aug 2004	Togliatti, Russia	Challenger	Hard	(Slovakia) Ladislav Švarc	(Russia) Teymuraz Gabashvili (Russia) Dmitry Vlasov	3–6, 7–5, 4–6
Loss	3–8	May 2005	Korea F2, Seogwipo	Futures	Hard	(United Kingdom) Ross Hutchins	(South Korea) Chung Hee-Seok (South Korea) Im Kyu-Tae	6–7^{(3–7)}, 6–3, 3–6
Loss	3–9	Jul 2005	Manchester, United Kingdom	Challenger	Grass	(United Kingdom) Daniel Kiernan	(United Kingdom) Mark Hilton (United Kingdom) Jonathan Marray	3–6, 2–6
Loss	3–10	Aug 2005	Pamplona, Spain	Challenger	Hard	(United Kingdom) Daniel Kiernan	(Pakistan) Aisam Qureshi (Croatia) Lovro Zovko	6–2, 3–6, 4–6
Win	4–10	Sep 2005	France F13, Mulhouse	Futures	Hard	(Russia) K Ivanov-Smolenskii	(France) Cyril Spanelis (France) Marc Steger	7–6^{(7–3)}, 6–4
Win	5–10	Nov 2005	Aachen, Germany	Challenger	Carpet	(United Kingdom) Jamie Delgado	(Germany) Michael Kohlmann (Germany) Lars Burgsmüller	2–6, 7–5, 6–3
Loss	5–11	Nov 2005	Prague, Czech Republic	Challenger	Carpet	(Netherlands) Jasper Smit	(Slovakia) Filip Polášek (Ukraine) Sergiy Stakhovsky	3–6, 6–3, 6–7^{(5–7)}
Loss	5–12	Apr 2006	Great Britain F5, Bath	Futures	Hard	(United Kingdom) Richard Bloomfield	(Germany) Tobias Clemens (Australia) Rameez Junaid	7–6^{(7–5)}, 2–6, 3–6
Loss	5–13	Aug 2006	Graz, Austria	Challenger	Hard	(United Kingdom) Jamie Delgado	(United Kingdom) Jonathan Marray (United Kingdom) Ross Hutchins	7–6^{(7–5)}, 4–6, [13–15]
Loss	5–14	May 2007	Zagreb, Croatia	Challenger	Clay	(United Kingdom) Jamie Delgado	(Germany) Tomas Behrend (Brazil) André Ghem	2–6, 1–6
Loss	5–15	Jun 2007	Surbiton, United Kingdom	Challenger	Grass	(Australia) Stephen Huss	(United States) Alex Kuznetsov (Germany) Mischa Zverev	6–2, 3–6, [6–10]
Win	6–15	Aug 2007	Istanbul, Turkey	Challenger	Hard	(United Kingdom) Ross Hutchins	(Belgium) Dick Norman (Belgium) Kristof Vliegen	5–7, 7–6^{(7–5)}, [10–7]
Loss	6–16	May 2008	Marrakech, Morocco	Challenger	Clay	(United Kingdom) Jamie Delgado	(Portugal) Fred Gil (Romania) Florin Mergea	2–6, 3–6
Win	7–16	Oct 2008	Rennes, France	Challenger	Carpet	(Belgium) Dick Norman	(Switzerland) Yves Allegro (Romania) Horia Tecău	6–3, 6–4
Loss	7–17	Oct 2008	Kolding, Denmark	Challenger	Hard	(Australia) Todd Perry	(United States) Brendan Evans (South Africa) Chris Haggard	3–6, 5–7
Loss	7–18	Nov 2008	Eckental, Germany	Challenger	Carpet	(Brazil) Márcio Torres	(Switzerland) Yves Allegro (Romania) Horia Tecău	3–6, 6–3, [7–10]
Loss	7–19	Mar 2009	Sarajevo, Bosnia & Herzegovina	Challenger	Hard	(Netherlands) Rogier Wassen	(Russia) Konstantin Kravchuk (Poland) Dawid Olejniczak	2–6, 6–3, [7–10]
Win	8–19	Apr 2009	Monza, Italy	Challenger	Clay	(United States) Travis Rettenmaier	(Czech Republic) Dušan Karol (Czech Republic) Jaroslav Pospíšil	7–5, 6–7^{(6–8)}, [10–4]
Loss	8–20	Apr 2009	Sofia, Bulgaria	Challenger	Clay	(Australia) Peter Luczak	(Slovakia) Dominik Hrbatý (Czech Republic) David Škoch	2–6, 4–6
Loss	8–21	May 2009	Tenerife, Spain	Challenger	Hard	(United Kingdom) Josh Goodall	(Austria) Alexander Peya (Germany) Philipp Petzschner	2–6, 6–3, [4–10]
