= Jonathan Marray =

British tennis player (born 1981)

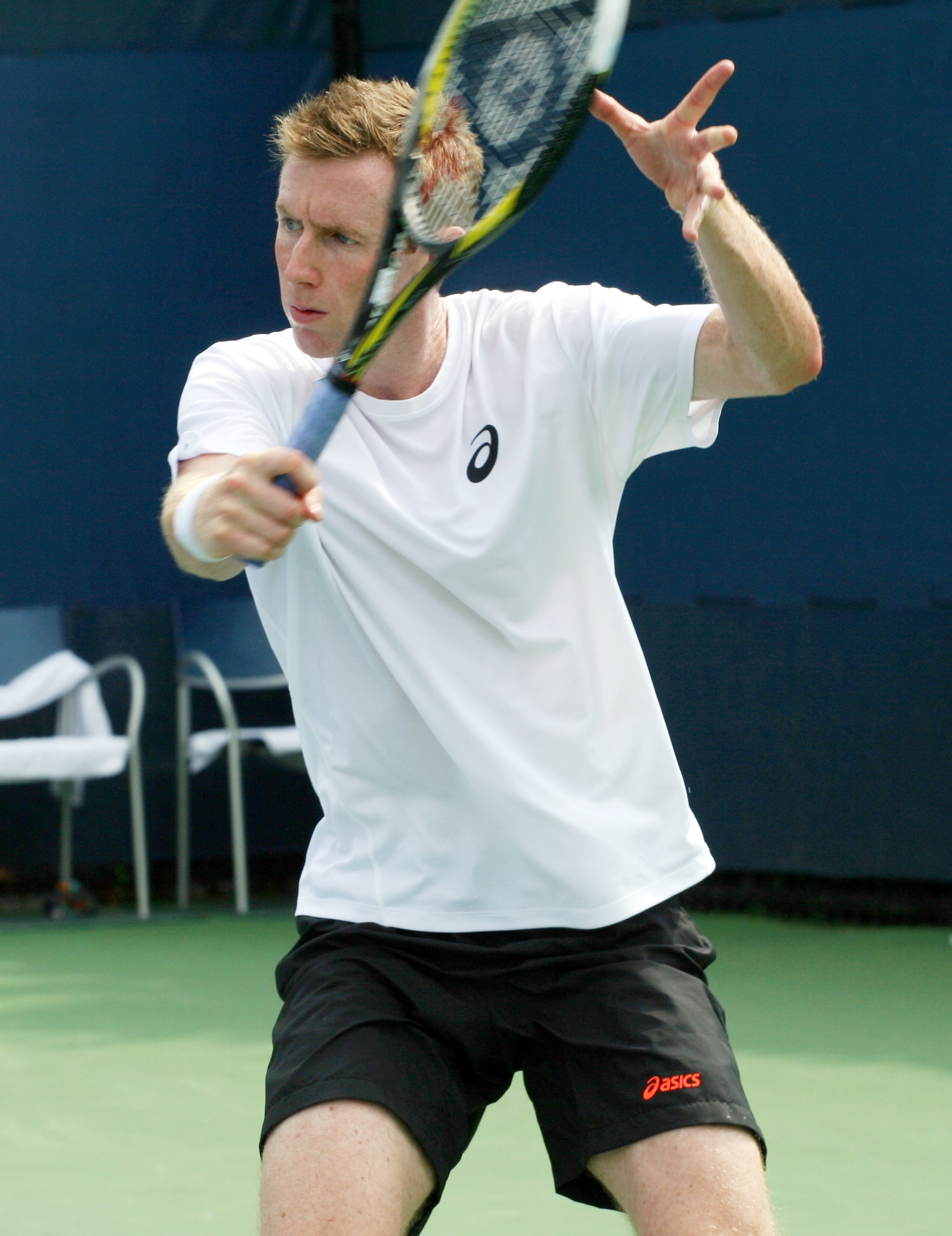
- Country (sports): (United Kingdom) Great Britain
- Residence: Sheffield, England
- Born: 10 March 1981 (age 45) Liverpool, England
- Height: 1.88 m (6 ft 2 in)
- Turned pro: 2000
- Retired: February 2017
- Plays: Right-handed (1-handed backhand)
- Prize money: US$1,173,631

Singles
- Career record: 4–8
- Career titles: 0
- Highest ranking: No. 215 (25 April 2005)

Grand Slam singles results
- Australian Open: Q3 (2007)
- French Open: Q1 (2007)
- Wimbledon: 1R (2004, 2005, 2007)
- US Open: Q2 (2005)

Doubles
- Career record: 96–120
- Career titles: 3
- Highest ranking: No. 15 (28 January 2013)

Grand Slam doubles results
- Australian Open: 2R (2013)
- French Open: 1R (2010, 2012, 2013, 2015)
- Wimbledon: W (2012)
- US Open: QF (2013)

Other doubles tournaments
- Tour Finals: SF (2012)

Mixed doubles
- Career record: 3–5
- Career titles: 0

Grand Slam mixed doubles results
- French Open: 1R (2013)
- Wimbledon: 3R (2010)
- US Open: 1R (2012)

Team competitions
- Davis Cup: World Group play-offs (2013)

Jonathan Marray (born 10 March 1981) is a former British tennis player and a Wimbledon Men's Doubles champion. Marray is a former top 20 doubles player, reaching a career high of world no. 15 in January 2013, mainly due to more regular appearances on the ATP World Tour, following his victory at Wimbledon 2012. He has also competed on the singles tour, reaching world no. 215 in April 2005, but was unable to continue his singles career, in part due to injuries.

Marray first came to prominence at the 2004 Queen's Club Championship where he reached the third round. Marray has since played predominantly on the ATP Challenger Tour, where he has reached one singles final and won multiple doubles competitions.

In 2012 at Wimbledon, he and his doubles partner, Frederik Nielsen, on a wildcard entry into the tournament, won the final in five sets, beating the much favoured fifth seeds, Robert Lindstedt and Horia Tecău. Marray was the first British men's doubles champion since Raymond Tuckey and Pat Hughes in 1936, the same year that Fred Perry last won the Wimbledon singles title. Marray and Nielsen also became the first players to win the men's doubles event on a wildcard.

Marray made his Davis Cup debut at 32, playing with Colin Fleming in the 2013 tie against Russia. Great Britain came from 2–0 down to beat Russia 3–2 to earn a World Group play-off. The last time Great Britain had come from 2–0 down to win a tie was 83 years previously against Germany. Marray was named for the 2013 World Group play-off against Croatia and so helped Great Britain earn promotion to the World Group for the first time since 2008.

== Early and personal life ==
Marray was born in Fazakerley, Liverpool, his father Kevin worked in computing at the Midland Bank, now HSBC, and his mother Kathleen was a nurse. Because of his father's job, they moved to Sheffield when Marray was three years old.

Marray attended Catholic primary school St Wilfrid's. Marray didn't start playing tennis until he was 10, when his mother took the family to a local club, Abbeydale Tennis Club, after watching Wimbledon. Marray was educated at All Saints Catholic High School, a Voluntary Aided Roman Catholic state secondary school, and played on the school's tennis courts Marray played tennis with his brother David at Hallamshire Tennis and Squash Club, and at the HSBC courts in Dore, Sheffield. Two years older, David held the upper hand on the tennis court until Jonny was 14 After A-levels, he decided against university and turned professional in 2000. Most British professionals are nurtured from childhood as part of the Lawn Tennis Association's elite. Marray had not competed in junior grand slam tournaments and didn't have a junior world ranking, but he was determined to give it a go.

Marray has been confused for Andy Murray, especially when Andy first came on to the scene. While playing in Challenger tournaments in the US, people were asking, ‘are you the new kid, the next big thing?’. “Although I had to tell them I wasn't, every time I say Marray, they say Murray.”

Marray shared a house in Sheffield with his sister, Siobhan, which he bought with his brother, David

== Career ==
=== 2000 ===
In February, Marray made his doubles debut at the Hull Challenger with Ben Gudzelak where they reached the quarterfinal. Marray/Gudzelak played five more tournaments in 2000.

Marray played his first singles match at the Dublin Futures F2 in June, losing in the first round. At his second tournament in November, Marray won the India F4 Futures in Lucknow.

=== 2001–2006 ===
Marray partnered Ben Riby and James May in the first half of 2001, then David Sherwood from July 2001 to June 2003;Marray/Sherwood winning five Futures titles during this period. Marray's first grand slam was the 2002 Wimbledon Championships with David Sherwood, losing in the 1st round.

From July 2003. Marray began a long-term partnership with Mark Hilton that lasted till the end of 2005, though it was not exclusive.

In early 2004, Marray won the British Satellite event in singles at Sheffield, while Marray/Hilton won four doubles tournaments on the satellite tour and consequently, Marray was announced for his Davis Cup debut in the Europe/Africa Zone Group I tie against Luxembourg. However he missed out when his teammates Tim Henman, Greg Rusedski and Arvind Parmar all played; Great Britain winning 4–1.

He first hit the headlines, when he reached the third round of the 2004 Queen's Club Singles, getting his first wins on the ATP Tour. In the third round he lost to the sixth seed Lleyton Hewitt, 7–6(2), 7–6 (8), wasting seven set points over two sets (respectively six and one), Hewitt needed five match points to finish the contest. This earned him his first singles appearance at Wimbledon as a wild card, although he was defeated in the first round by Karol Beck.

At this time, Marray was seen as a possible successor to Tim Henman, having a natural serve/volley game.

In September 2004, Marray/Sherwood won their sixth and final Futures title, Mulhouse France F14.

In January 2005 he won his first Challenger doubles tournament in Wrexham, with Mark Hilton He reached his highest singles ranking of 215 in May 2005.

In 2006, Marray mainly partnered Martin Lee, but played with eleven other players, winning 3 Challengers and a Futures tournament.

From May 2004 to June 2006, he stayed in the top 300 of the singles ranking for all but one week, but despite this consistency, did not progress any further. He reached a then-high of 138 in the doubles in August 2005. He did manage to make a final in singles of an ATP Challenger event, at the Nottingham Challenger event where he lost in straight sets to Robin Vik 3–6, 2–6.

=== 2007–2008 ===
At Wimbledon 2007, partnering Richard Bloomfield, he made the third round, losing to the top seeded Bryan brothers. This was his best Grand Slam performance until 2012. His doubles ranking was a lot higher than in singles, so he took the opportunity to play better tournaments in doubles than singles. He continued to compete on the Challenger tour, although he eventually stopped playing singles matches. Following the Championships, Marray was injured and after shoulder surgery, he struggled to find form and confidence, and considered quitting. Marray didn't play again until Wimbledon 2008 where he and Alex Bogdanovic were beaten in the first round. At his next tournament, Marray and Frederik Nielsen reached the finals of the Dublin Challenger.

In December 2008, Marray partnered Colin Fleming whose regular partner Ken Skupski was resting, and played in the Czech Republic, winning two Futures in Frydland Nad Ostravici, and Opava

=== 2009 ===
In January, Marray and Richard Bloomfield won the Sheffield Futures.

Marray teamed up with fourteen players this year, but his lack of success meant he came close to giving up numerous times and becoming a coach. In 2009, things reached their nadir, but it proved to be a breakthrough season. Marray said "I played in a qualifying match in Nottingham just before Wimbledon, and I wasn't even trying to win the match. I just wanted off the court. I was 29 years old and I thought, if I'm doing that, what am I even doing playing tennis? It was quite emotional." However the fear that he hadn't done himself justice stopped him quitting.

At Wimbledon, he made it into the third round for only the second time, whilst partnering Jamie Delgado in their fifth event of the year. They lost in straight sets to the second seeds and eventual winners, Daniel Nestor and Nenad Zimonjić 5–7, 4–6, 4–6. This thrust him back into the top 200 of the world's doubles rankings, setting off a period of improved form. Following Wimbledon, Marray's increased ranking allowed him to become a regular on the ATP Challenger Tour, winning two titles with Jamie Murray and one with Joshua Goodall. He finished the season in the top 100 for the first time.

=== 2010-2011 ===
Marray had partnered Jamie Murray sporadically, but now played regularly with him for the first 7 months of 2010. Thereafter Marray embarked on a steady partnership with Jamie Delgado until January 2012.

Through 2010 and 2011, Marray continued to have some success on the Challenger circuit, competing in 14 finals and winning 7. His most successful Grand Slam appearance was at the 2011 US Open with Delgado. They made it into the third round but lost to sixth seeds and tournament runners up Mariusz Fyrstenberg and Marcin Matkowski in three sets 7–6^{(7–5)}, 2–6, 3–6. He finished the season ranked 86th in the world.

=== 2012: Wimbledon Men's Doubles Champion ===
Marray partnered Jamie Delgado at the Australian Open and Dustin Brown at the French Open, but lost both in the first round. He also reached seven Challenger tour finals, winning two in Bosnia and Italy with Dustin Brown.

Marray had been friends with Frederik Nielsen since their early days on the senior tour, but had only played together twice before in 2006 and 2008. However, during 2012, he began partnering Frederik Nielsen, reaching the final of the 2012 Aegon Trophy, but lost to fellow Brit Dominic Inglot and Treat Conrad Huey of the Philippines, in three sets 4–6, 7–6^{(11–9)}, 8–10.

At Wimbledon, Marray and partner Frederik Nielsen were granted a wildcard. Marray was supposed to compete with Adil Shamasdin, but they did not get their paperwork in time. Before they reached the finals, they defeated two seeded teams, in addition to the defending champions Bob and Mike Bryan in the semi-final, over four sets 6–4, 7–6^{(11–9)}, 6–7^{(4–7)}, 7–6^{(7–5)}. By getting into the final, Marray became the first British man to get to a Wimbledon men's doubles final since 1960. In the final, they faced fifth seeds Robert Lindstedt and Horia Tecău. At one set all, during the third set tie break, Marray called a fault on himself after the umpire did not see that he had inadvertently touched the net while hitting a volley, which earned him praise for his sportsmanship and honesty. Despite this, Marray and Nielsen went on to win in five sets 4–6, 6–4, 7–6^{(7–5)}, 6–7^{(5–7)}, 6–3.

Marray became the first British player to win the Wimbledon men's doubles final since 1936, he thus became the first British person to win any Wimbledon Championship title since Jamie Murray in 2007; Marray and Nielsen became the first players to get to the final and to win the men's doubles on a wildcard at Wimbledon. This also raised his doubles ranking to a career-high no. 21 in the world. This was the first time Marray broke into the top 50 in the rankings, making him Britain's No. 1.

Marray credited sport psychologist, Richard De Souza, for helping him win Wimbledon. Saying that Richard “has been the biggest help to my tennis this year. A lot of my performances this week have to be put down to the work I have done with him.”

In spite of their Wimbledon victory, Nielsen declared that he liked playing singles, and wouldn't be playing doubles full-time.

Following his win, Marray received direct entry to higher level Masters tournaments for the first time. He initially struggled, however, playing with seven different partners and winning just two of thirteen matches in his eleven tournaments after Wimbledon. At the US Open Marray partnered again with Nielsen and were ranked as the eleventh seeds. They were beaten in the second round by Jesse Levine and Marinko Matosevic in three sets 1–6, 7–6^{(8–6)}, 4–6. Marray also competed in the Mixed doubles event but lost in the first round to Abigail Spears and Scott Lipsky in straight sets 1–6, 3–6. He partnered Vladimíra Uhlířová.

At the Paris Masters, Marray had his most successful run at a masters 1000 and since Wimbledon, reaching the semi-finals with Paul Hanley. On their way to the semi-finals they beat top seeds the Bryan Brothers in three sets. They eventually lost to fifth seeds and eventual winners Mahesh Bhupathi and Rohan Bopanna in straight sets. This put Marray into the top 20 for the first time in his career. Following straight on from Paris, he and Nielsen competed at the ATP World Tour Finals, for which they qualified thanks to winning at Wimbledon. The pair won their opening two matches of the group but lost their final match, however they qualified out of the robin round. They were eliminated in the semi-finals to eventual winners Marcel Granollers and Marc López in straight sets 4–6, 3–6. Marray ended the year ranked No. 17 in the world, a career high that made him the Britain's No. 1 doubles player.

In December, the Lawn Tennis Association announced that Marray was one of 21 players set to receive the LTA's highest level of funding next season, which is supported through Team Aegon.

=== 2013 ===
Marray began 2013 partnering Dustin Brown, reaching the semi-finals of the Qatar Open before being defeated by Filip Polášek and Julian Knowle in three sets. At the Australian Open, Marray was seeded for the first time at a Grand Slam, partnering Brazilian player André Sá, and seeded 16th. They reached the second round, where they were defeated by Dutch pair Robin Haase and Igor Sijsling in straight sets. On 28 January he achieved his highest ranking, reaching number 15 in the world, no English born doubles player has ever been ranked higher (doubles rankings being introduced in 1976)

Marray later teamed up with fellow Brit Colin Fleming for several events, including a semifinal appearance at the Open Sud de France, where they were the top seeds.

After the pair were knocked out in the first round of the Miami Masters, Marray and Fleming headed to Coventry, UK to play in the doubles rubber of Great Britain's Davis Cup tie with Russia. Marray was making his Davis Cup debut at 32. After the Great Britain team had lost the first two singles rubbers, the pair won against Victor Baluda and Igor Kunitsyn 6–1, 6–4, 6–2 in only an hour and a half to keep the tie alive. A day later James Ward levelled the tie at 2–2 after beating Tursunov in five sets. Dan Evans then defeated world no. 80 Evgeny Donskoy comprehensively in straight sets, thus securing what was described as a "famous victory". The last time Great Britain had come from 2–0 down to win a Davis Cup tie was 83 years ago against Germany, Consequently, Great Britain won a place in the 16-team World Group play-offs in September.

Continuing his partnership with Fleming, Marray reached his second career ATP final, at the 2013 Aegon International. En route to the final, the pair defeated Marray's former partner Frederik Nielsen, with whom he had won the Wimbledon doubles title the previous year. In the final the pair faced the duo of Austrian Alexander Peya and Bruno Soares of Brazil. Despite a strong start in which they took the first set, the pair couldn't maintain their intensity and ultimately lost in three sets, a trio of double faults from Marray in the 8th game of the second set proving to be fatal.

Marray entered Wimbledon as defending champion, but despite his previous success with Frederik Nielsen, the two decided not to play together, Marray instead was partnered by Colin Fleming. The two made it to the third round, but they couldn't replicate the form that saw Marray clinch the title during the previous season, going out in straight sets to Daniel Nestor, and Robert Lindstedt, against whom Marray won the title the previous year. Failure to defend his title meant that Marray plummeted 19 places in the ATP rankings to no. 34, making him the second ranked British player behind Fleming.

Following on from Wimbledon, Marray remained in his partnership with Fleming, and going into the American hardcourt season, the pair made their second final of the year at the BB&T Atlanta Open, Marray's first on hard courts. Here they faced French-Dutch duo of Edouard Roger-Vasselin and Igor Sijsling, however despite a close opening set, the Brits were ultimately defeated in straight sets. Marray had to miss both Montreal and Cincinnati due to injury, and so the pair played their next tournament at the US Open. Marray reached only the second Grand Slam quarterfinal of his career, defeating Indian/French duo of Rohan Bopanna and Édouard Roger-Vasselin before falling to Bob and Mike Bryan in a close straight sets encounter.

For the Davis Cup World Group play-off against Croatia in Umag on clay, Andy Murray, Dan Evans, James Ward and Colin Fleming were initially announced as the Great Britain team. However captain Leon Smith, called up Marray and Kyle Edmund, with Marray replacing James Ward, to give the team more doubles options, and Kyle Edmund acting as a hitting partner. In the event, Andy Murray, playing in his first Davis Cup tie for two years, won both his singles matches and the doubles with Colin Fleming to beat Croatia 4–1, and return Great Britain to the World Group for the first time since 2008.

During the Asian swing of tournaments, Marray continued to partner Fleming, however the pair only managed two second round appearances, at the China Open and the Shanghai Masters respectively. After the pair lost in the first round of the Swiss Indoors, Marray parted ways with Fleming, playing his final tournament of the year with Igor Sijsling, however once again losing his opening match. Marray ended the year ranked number 41 in the world, having lost a considerable number of points from failing to qualify for the ATP World Tour Finals.

In November, the Lawn Tennis Association announced a dramatic cut in elite player funding, with all financial support being withdrawn from Britain's doubles specialists and any singles players aged over 24, to reduce the number of supported players from 16 this year to just six in 2014.

=== 2014 ===
Marray struggled for full fitness and finding a regular doubles partner, travelling to tournaments with no plan whatsoever. He jetted out to Indian Wells in March, unable to convince anyone to join him on court, until Wimbledon's reigning men's singles champion Andy Murray offered to play with him. After fans queued around the grounds to watch Roger Federer and Stanislas Wawrinka play together, it was standing room only for Murray and Marray's first competitive match together. Andy Murray and Jonny Marray won a thrilling doubles clash against Gaël Monfils and Juan Mónaco, 6–4 4–6 11–9, only to lose in the second round 7–6 (7–1), 6–3 to the No 2 seeds Alexander Peya and Bruno Soares.

Following this, Marray was then out for two months with a torn calf. At Wimbledon, playing with Australian John-Patrick Smith for the first time, they won their first round match 6–4 5–7 6–4 over Andreas Siljeström and Igor Zelenay, before losing their next match against 15th seeds Juan Sebastian Cabal and Marcin Matkowski.

In September, Ross Hutchins decided to quit the Tour, soon after his return following treatment for Hodgkin's Lymphoma. That prompted his partner Colin Fleming to team up with Jonny Marray.

Their first tournament together was the ATP Challenger in Istanbul. Their combined ranking points meant they were top seeds, making it all the way to the final and winning 6–4, 2–6, 10–8. Marray and Fleming moved onto the main ATP tour event in Metz, however, as their combined ranking was not quite high enough for direct entry, they temporarily split. Marray paired up with Jamie Murray, Fleming partnered Michael Venus of New Zealand.

=== 2015 ===
In January, Marray and Yen-Hsun Lu claimed an impressive 6–3 7–6 (7/4) win over top seeds Raven Klassen and home favourite Leander Paes in the Chennai final in India. It was Marray's first ATP-level title since his famous surprise victory with Freddie Nielsen in SW19 back in 2012.

In February, Marray and Fleming were narrowly beaten in the doubles final at the Open 13 in Marseille. Looking for their first title together in their third final, Fleming and Marray went down 6–4 3–6 10–8 to Croatia's Marin Draganja and Henri Kontinen of Finland despite winning four more points.

Having failed to get the results they wanted, Fleming decided to split from Jonny Marray. Fleming said breaking the news to Marray, a good friend, had been hard.

In July, Marray won the ATP 250 event in Newport, Rhode Island alongside Pakistani player Aisam Qureshi. The win put Marray back into the world's top 50.

=== 2016 ===
Aisam-Ul-Haq Qureshi, ranked 37, announced that during the 2016 season he would partner Marray ranked 53, but after three first round defeats, which included the Australian Open, they parted. Marray partnered Mahesh Bhupathi and Rameez Junaid several times with occasional runs to the semi and quarter of Challengers and Tour events.

In April, Marray started a more successful regular partnership with Canadian Adil Shamasdin, reaching the semifinals of the Aegon Surbiton Trophy.

At Wimbledon, Marray/Shamasdin beat last year's champions Jean-Julien Rojer and Horia Tecău in the first round and progressed to the quarterfinals. This was the first time Marray had reached this stage at a Grand Slam since his Championship win in 2012.

Two weeks later, Marray/Shamasdin reached the finals at the Hall of Fame Championships in Rhode Island.

=== 2017: Final year and retirement ===
In February 2017 season Marray played his final tournaments and retired one month before his 36th birthday, having played professionally for 17 years. His last tournaments were the ATP250 event at the Open Sud De France, then the Challenger La Manche.

== Significant finals ==
=== Grand Slam finals ===
==== Doubles: 1 (1 title) ====
Outcome	Year	Championship	Surface	Partner	Opponents	Score
Win	2012	Wimbledon	Grass	(Denmark) Frederik Nielsen	(Sweden) Robert Lindstedt (Romania) Horia Tecău	4–6, 6–4, 7–6^{(7–5)}, 6–7^{(5–7)}, 6–3

== ATP career finals ==
=== Doubles: 8 (3 titles, 5 runners-up) ===
Legend Grand Slam tournaments (1–0) ATP World Tour Finals (–) ATP World Tour Masters 1000 (–) ATP World Tour 500 Series (–) ATP World Tour 250 Series (2–5)	Titles by surface Hard (1–3) Clay (–) Grass (2–2)	Titles by setting Outdoor (3–3) Indoor (0–2)

Result	W–L	Date	Tournament	Tier	Surface	Partner	Opponents	Score
Win	1–0	Jul 2012	Wimbledon Championships, London, UK	Grand Slam	Grass	(Denmark) Frederik Nielsen	(Sweden) Robert Lindstedt (Romania) Horia Tecău	4–6, 6–4, 7–6^{(7–5)}, 6–7^{(5–7)}, 6–3
Loss	1–1	Jun 2013	Eastbourne International, UK	250 Series	Grass	(United Kingdom) Colin Fleming	(Austria) Alexander Peya (Brazil) Bruno Soares	6–3, 3–6, [8–10]
Loss	1–2	Jul 2013	Atlanta Open, US	250 Series	Hard	(United Kingdom) Colin Fleming	(France) Édouard Roger-Vasselin (Netherlands) Igor Sijsling	6–7^{(6–8)}, 3–6
Loss	1–3	Feb 2014	Open 13, France	250 Series	Hard (i)	(Australia) Paul Hanley	(France) Julien Benneteau (France) Édouard Roger-Vasselin	6–4, 6–7^{(6–8)}, [11–13]
Win	2–3	Jan 2015	Chennai Open, India	250 Series	Hard	(Chinese Taipei) Lu Yen-hsun	(South Africa) Raven Klaasen (India) Leander Paes	6–3, 7-6^{(7–4)}
Loss	2–4	Feb 2015	Open 13, France	250 Series	Hard (i)	(United Kingdom) Colin Fleming	(Croatia) Marin Draganja (Finland) Henri Kontinen	4–6, 6–3, [8–10]
Win	3–4	Jul 2015	Hall of Fame Tennis Championships, US	250 Series	Grass	(Pakistan) Aisam-ul-Haq Qureshi	(United States) Nicholas Monroe (Croatia) Mate Pavić	4–6, 6–3, [10–8]
Loss	3–5	Jul 2016	Hall of Fame Tennis Championships, US	250 Series	Grass	(Canada) Adil Shamasdin	(Australia) Sam Groth (Australia) Chris Guccione	4–6, 3–6

== ATP Challenger career finals ==
=== Singles: 1 (0–1) ===
Outcome	No.	Date	Tournament	Surface	Opponent in the final	Score in the final
Runner-up	1.	14 November 2005	Nottingham, Great Britain	Hard (o)	(Czech Republic) Robin Vik	3–6, 2–6

=== Doubles: 36 (19–17) ===
Outcome	No.	Date	Tournament	Surface	Partner	Opponents in the final	Score in the final
Runner-up	1.	8 March 2004	Wrexham, Great Britain	Hard (i)	(United Kingdom) Mark Hilton	(Czech Republic) Jaroslav Levinský (Germany) Alexander Waske	5–7, 6–7^{(1–7)}
Runner-up	2.	2 August 2004	Denver, Colorado	Hard (o)	(United Kingdom) Jamie Delgado	(United States) Brian Baker (United States) Rajeev Ram	2–6, 2–6
Winner	1.	24 January 2005	Wrexham, Great Britain	Hard (i)	(United Kingdom) Mark Hilton	(Finland) Tuomas Ketola (Denmark) Frederik Nielsen	6–3, 6–2
Winner	2.	18 April 2005	Nottingham, Great Britain	Hard (o)	(United Kingdom) Mark Hilton	(India) Mustafa Ghouse (India) Harsh Mankad	6–4, 3–6, 6–3
Winner	3.	11 July 2005	Manchester, Great Britain	Grass	(United Kingdom) Mark Hilton	(United Kingdom) James Auckland (United Kingdom) Dan Kiernan	6–3, 6–2
Winner	4.	6 March 2006	Kyoto, Japan	Carpet	(Australia) Alun Jones	(India) Prakash Amritraj (India) Rohan Bopanna	6–4, 3–6, [14–12]
Winner	5.	24 July 2006	Nottingham, Great Britain	Grass	(United Kingdom) Lee Martin	(United Kingdom) Joshua Goodall (United Kingdom) Ross Hutchins	3–6, 6–3, [10–3]
Winner	6.	14 August 2006	Graz, Austria	Hard (o)	(United Kingdom) Ross Hutchins	(United Kingdom) James Auckland (United Kingdom) Jamie Delgado	6–7^{(5–7)}, 6–4, [15–13]
Runner-up	3.	30 June 2008	Dublin, Ireland	Carpet (o)	(Denmark) Frederik Nielsen	(India) Prakash Amritraj (Pakistan) Aisam-ul-Haq Qureshi	3–6, 6–7^{(6–8)}
Winner	7.	13 July 2009	Manchester, Great Britain	Grass	(United Kingdom) Joshua Goodall	(United Kingdom) Colin Fleming (United Kingdom) Ken Skupski	6–7^{(1–7)}, 6–3, [11–9]
Winner	8.	7 September 2009	Alphen aan den Rijn, Netherlands	Clay	(United Kingdom) Jamie Murray	(Ukraine) Sergei Bubka (Ukraine) Sergiy Stakhovsky	6–1, 6–4
Runner-up	4.	12 October 2009	Kolding, Denmark	Hard (i)	(Pakistan) Aisam-ul-Haq Qureshi	(Austria) Martin Fischer (Austria) Philipp Oswald	5–7, 3–6
Winner	9.	2 November 2009	Astana, Kazakhstan	Hard (i)	(United Kingdom) Jamie Murray	(United States) David Martin (Netherlands) Rogier Wassen	6–1, 6–4
Winner	10.	11 January 2010	Salinas, Ecuador	Hard (o)	(United Kingdom) Jamie Murray	(Thailand) Sanchai Ratiwatana (Thailand) Sonchat Ratiwatana	6–3, 6–4
Winner	11.	8 February 2010	Bergamo, Italy	Hard (o)	(United Kingdom) Jamie Murray	(Slovakia) Karol Beck (Czech Republic) Jiří Krkoška	6–1, 6–7^{(2–7)}, [10–8]
Runner-up	5.	22 March 2010	Jersey, Great Britain	Hard	(United Kingdom) Jamie Murray	(India) Rohan Bopanna (United Kingdom) Ken Skupski	2–6, 6–1, [6–10]
Runner-up	6.	24 April 2010	Rhodes, Greece	Hard (o)	(United Kingdom) Jamie Murray	(Jamaica) Dustin Brown (Germany) Simon Stadler	6–7^{(4–7)}, 7–6^{(7–4)}, [7–10]
Runner-up	7.	20 September 2010	Iznir, Turkey	Hard (o)	(United Kingdom) Jamie Delgado	(Australia) Rameez Junaid (Germany) Frank Moser	2–6, 4–6
Runner-up	8.	8 November 2010	Aachen, Germany	Carpet (i)	(United Kingdom) Jamie Delgado	(Belgium) Ruben Bemelmans (Netherlands) Igor Sijsling	4–6, 6–3, [9–11]
Winner	12.	24 January 2011	Heilbronn, Germany	Hard (i)	(United Kingdom) Jamie Delgado	(Germany) Frank Moser (Czech Republic) David Škoch	6–1, 6–4
Runner-up	9.	7 February 2011	Quimper, France	Hard (i)	(United Kingdom) Jamie Delgado	(United States) James Cerretani (Canada) Adil Shamasdin	3–6, 7–5, [5–10]
Winner	13.	7 March 2011	Sarajevo, Bosnia and Herzegovina	Hard (o)	(United Kingdom) Jamie Delgado	(Switzerland) Yves Allegro (Germany) Andreas Beck	7–6^{(7–4)},6–2
Winner	14.	21 March 2011	Bath, Great Britain	Hard (i)	(United Kingdom) Jamie Delgado	(Switzerland) Yves Allegro (Germany) Andreas Beck	6–3, 6–4
Runner-up	10.	4 April 2011	Monza, Italy	Clay	(United Kingdom) Jamie Delgado	(Sweden) Johan Brunström (Denmark) Frederik Nielsen	7–5, 2–6, [7–10]
Winner	15.	9 May 2011	Bordeaux, France	Clay	(United Kingdom) Jamie Delgado	(France) Julien Benneteau (France) Nicolas Mahut	7–5, 6–3
Winner	16.	November 2011	Loughborough, Great Britain	Hard	(United Kingdom) Jamie Delgado	(Republic of Ireland) Sam Barry (Republic of Ireland) Daniel Glancy	6–2, 6–2
Runner-up	11.	12 February 2012	Quimper, France	Hard	(Germany) Dustin Brown	(France) Pierre-Hugues Herbert (France) Maxime Teixeira	6–7^{(5–7)}, 4–6
Runner-up	12.	4 March 2012	Cherbourg, France	Hard	(Germany) Dustin Brown	(Lithuania) Laurynas Grigelis (Belarus) Uladzimir Ignatik	6–4, 6–7^{(9–11)}, [0–10]
Winner	17.	12 March 2012	Sarajevo, Bosnia and Herzegovina	Hard	(Germany) Dustin Brown	(Slovakia) Michal Mertiňák (Slovakia) Igor Zelenay	7–6^{(7–2)}, 2–6, [11–9]
Runner-up	13.	7 April 2012	Barletta, Italy	Clay	(Slovakia) Igor Zelenay	(Sweden) Johan Brunström (Belgium) Dick Norman	4–6, 5–7
Winner	18.	21 April 2012	Rome, Italy	Clay	(Germany) Dustin Brown	(Romania) Andrei Dăescu (Romania) Florin Mergea	6–4, 7–6^{(7–0)}
Runner-up	14.	20 May 2012	Bordeaux, France	Clay	(France) Olivier Charroin	(Slovakia) Martin Kližan (Slovakia) Igor Zelenay	6–7^{(5–7)}, 6–4, [4–10]
Runner-up	15.	10 June 2012	Nottingham, Great Britain	Grass	(Denmark) Frederik Nielsen	(Philippines) Treat Conrad Huey (United Kingdom) Dominic Inglot	4–6, 7–6^{(11–9)}, [8–10]
Winner	19.	14 September 2014	Istanbul, Turkey	Hard	(United Kingdom) Colin Fleming	(Australia) Jordan Kerr (France) Fabrice Martin	6–4, 2–6, [10–8]
Runner-up	16.	16 November 2014	Helsinki, Finland	Hard (i)	(Germany) Philipp Petzschner	(Finland) Henri Kontinen (Finland) Jarkko Nieminen	6–7^{(2–7)}, 4–6
Runner-up	17.	29 January 2017	Rennes, France	Hard (i)	(Austria) Julian Knowle	(Russia) Evgeny Donskoy (Russia) Mikhail Elgin	2–6, 6–3, [9–11]

== Doubles performance timeline ==
Key
W	F	SF	QF	#R	RR	Q#	P#	DNQ	A	Z#	PO	G	S	B	NMS	NTI	P	NH

(W) winner; (F) finalist; (SF) semifinalist; (QF) quarterfinalist; (#R) rounds 4, 3, 2, 1; (RR) round-robin stage; (Q#) qualification round; (P#) preliminary round; (DNQ) did not qualify; (A) absent; (Z#) Davis/Fed Cup Zonal Group (with number indication) or (PO) play-off; (G) gold, (S) silver or (B) bronze Olympic/Paralympic medal; (NMS) not a Masters tournament; (NTI) not a Tier I tournament; (P) postponed; (NH) not held; (SR) strike rate (events won / competed); (W–L) win–loss record.

Current till 2017 Open Sud de France.

Tournament	2000	2001	2002	2003	2004	2005	2006	2007	2008	2009	2010	2011	2012	2013	2014	2015	2016	2017	SR	W–L
Grand Slam tournaments
Australian Open	A	A	A	A	A	A	A	A	A	A	A	A	1R	2R	1R	1R	1R	A	0 / 5	1–5
French Open	A	A	A	A	A	A	A	A	A	A	1R	A	1R	1R	A	1R	A	A	0 / 4	0–4
Wimbledon	A	A	1R	1R	1R	2R	1R	3R	1R	3R	1R	2R	W	3R	2R	3R	QF	A	1 / 15	20–14
US Open	A	A	A	A	A	A	A	A	A	A	A	3R	2R	QF	1R	2R	A	A	0 / 5	7–5
Win–loss	0–0	0–0	0–1	0–1	0–1	1–1	0–1	2–1	0–1	2–1	0–2	3–2	7–3	6–4	1–3	3–4	3–2	0–0	1 / 29	28–28
Year-end championship
ATP Finals	Did not qualify												SF	Did not qualify					0 / 2	2–2
ATP World Tour Masters 1000
Indian Wells Masters	A	A	A	A	A	A	A	A	A	A	A	A	A	A	2R	A	A	A	0 / 1	1–1
Miami Masters	A	A	A	A	A	A	A	A	A	A	A	A	A	1R	2R	A	A	A	0 / 2	1–2
Monte Carlo Masters	A	A	A	A	A	A	A	A	A	A	A	A	A	2R	A	A	A	A	0 / 1	1–1
Madrid Masters	NH		A	A	A	A	A	A	A	A	A	A	A	A	A	A	A	A	0 / 0	0–0
Rome Masters	A	A	A	A	A	A	A	A	A	A	A	A	A	2R	A	A	A	A	0 / 1	1–1
Canada Masters	A	A	A	A	A	A	A	A	A	A	A	A	1R	A	A	A	A	A	0 / 1	0–1
Cincinnati Masters	A	A	A	A	A	A	A	A	A	A	A	A	1R	A	A	A	A	A	0 / 1	0–1
Shanghai Masters	Not Held									A	A	A	2R	2R	A	A	A	A	0 / 2	2–2
Paris Masters	A	A	A	A	A	A	A	A	A	A	A	A	SF	1R	A	A	A	A	0 / 2	3–2
Win–loss	0–0	0–0	0–0	0–0	0–0	0–0	0–0	0–0	0–0	0–0	0–0	0–0	4–4	3–5	2–2	0–0	0–0	0–0	0 / 11	9–11
National representation
Davis Cup	A	A	A	A	A	A	A	A	A	A	A	A	A	PO	A	A	A	A	0 / 0	1–0
Career statistics
Finals	0	0	0	0	0	0	0	0	0	0	0	0	1	2	1	3	1	0	8	
Titles	0	0	0	0	0	0	0	0	0	0	0	0	1	0	0	2	0	0	3	
Overall win–loss	0–0	0–0	0–1	1–2	0–3	1–3	0–1	2–2	0–1	2–1	1–8	3–8	17–19	26–22	12–17	19–17	12–14	0–1	96–120	
Year-end ranking	798	651	198	248	196	159	177	331	389	92	112	86	17	41	76	53	93	702	44%	
