= Jan Mertl =

Czech tennis player (born 1982)

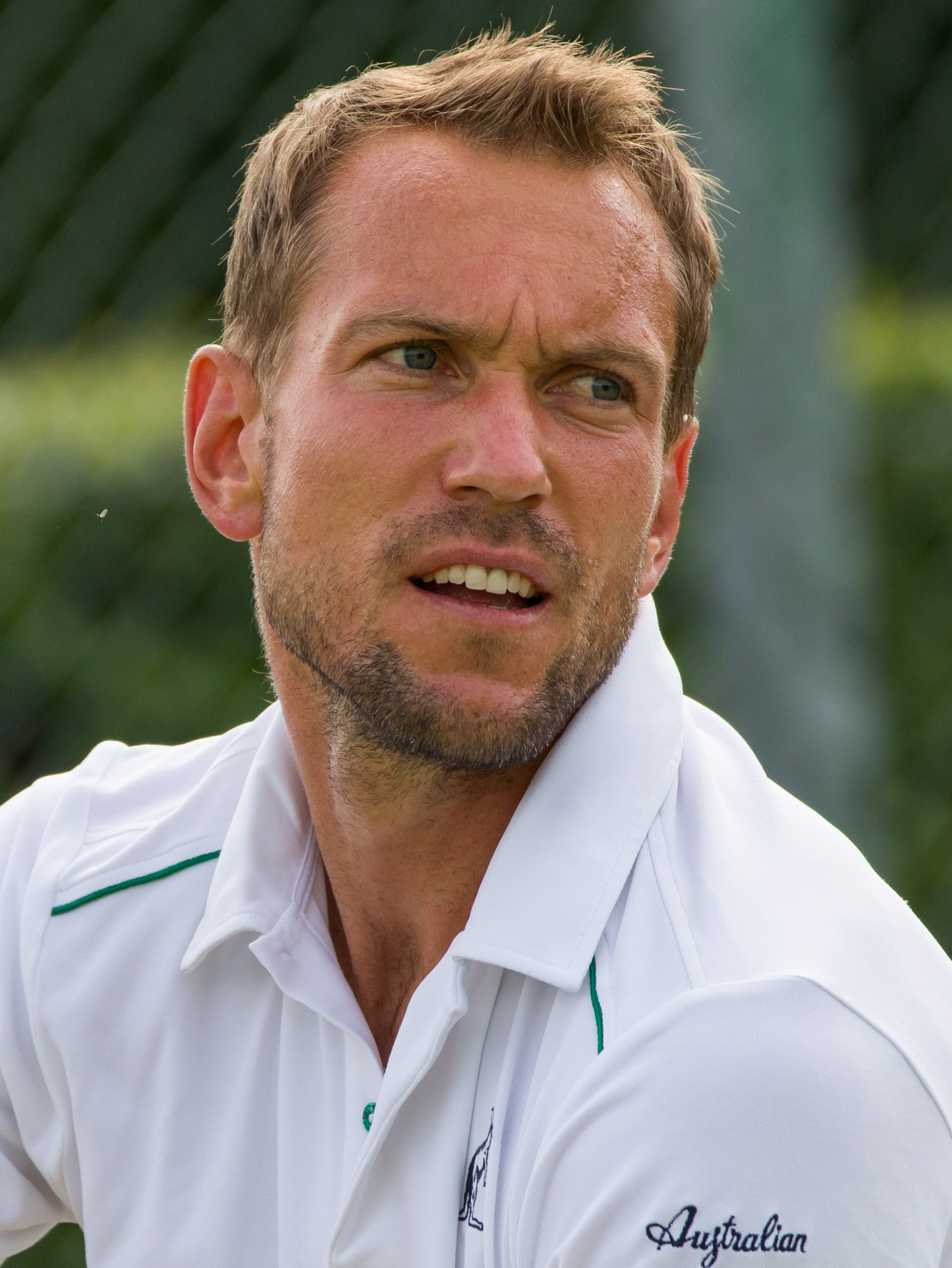
- Country (sports): Czech Republic
- Residence: Teplice, Czech Republic
- Born: 3 January 1982 (age 43); Ústí nad Labem, Czechoslovakia
- Height: 1.90 m (6 ft 3 in)
- Turned pro: 2002
- Plays: Right-handed
- Prize money: $610,165

Singles
- Career record: 2–1
- Career titles: 0
- Highest ranking: No. 163 (23 July 2007)

Grand Slam singles results
- Australian Open: Q3 (2008, 2013)
- French Open: Q2 (2012, 2014)
- Wimbledon: Q3 (2015)
- US Open: Q2 (2013, 2014, 2015)

Doubles
- Career record: 0–0
- Career titles: 0
- Highest ranking: No. 131 (11 June 2007)
- Last updated on: 16 July 2023.

Jan Mertl (born 3 January 1982) is a Czech former tennis player who competed mainly on the ITF Futures Tour and ATP Challenger Tour. On 23 July 2007, he reached his highest ATP singles ranking of 163.

Mertl made his ATP main draw debut at 2016 Swiss Open Gstaad, defeating Yann Marti to score his first ATP-level win.

Mertl is the coach of Czech WTA player Markéta Vondroušová.

== Challenger finals ==
=== Singles: 3 (0–3) ===
Legend
ATP Challenger Tour (0–3)

Result	No.	Date (Final)	Tournament	Surface	Opponent	Score
Loss	1.	18 March 2007	Sarajevo, Bosnia and Herzegovina	Hard (i)	(Latvia) Ernests Gulbis	6–4, 4–6, 6–7^{(2–7)}
Loss	2.	18 March 2012	Sarajevo, Bosnia and Herzegovina	Hard (i)	(Czech Republic) Jan Hernych	3–6, 6–3, 6–7^{(5–7)}
Loss	3.	24 March 2012	Bath, Great Britain	Hard	(Germany) Dustin Brown	6–7^{(1–7)}, 4–6

=== Doubles: 9 (1–8) ===
Result	No.	Date	Tournament	Surface	Partner	Opponents in the final	Score
Loss	1.	4 September 2005	Kyiv, Ukraine	Clay	(Czech Republic) Lukáš Dlouhý	(Argentina) Diego Junqueira (Argentina) Martín Vassallo Argüello	4–6, 2–6
Loss	2.	9 July 2006	Pozoblanco, Spain	Hard	(Slovakia) Ivo Klec	(United States) Justin Gimelstob (United States) Kevin Kim	3–6, 5–7
Loss	3.	16 July 2006	Poznań, Poland	Clay	(Greece) Vasilis Mazarakis	(Poland) Tomasz Bednarek (Poland) Michał Przysiężny	3–6, 6–3, [8–10]
Loss	4.	4 March 2007	Wolfsburg, Germany	Carpet (i)	(United Kingdom) Joshua Goodall	(Austria) Alexander Peya (Germany) Lars Uebel	4–6, 4–6
Loss	5.	18 March 2007	Sarajevo, Bosnia and Herzegovina	Hard (i)	(Czech Republic) Lukáš Rosol	(Latvia) Ernests Gulbis (Latvia) Deniss Pavlovs	4–6, 3–6
Loss	6.	3 June 2007	Busan, South Korea	Hard	(Australia) Nathan Healey	(Ukraine) Sergei Bubka (United States) John Paul Fruttero	6–4, 6–7^{(5–7)}, [6–10]
Loss	7.	6 January 2008	Nouméa, France	Hard	(Austria) Martin Slanar	(Italy) Flavio Cipolla (Italy) Simone Vagnozzi	4–6, 4–6
Win	8.	7 February 2010	Kazan, Russia	Hard (i)	(Kazakhstan) Yuri Schukin	(Germany) Tobias Kamke (Germany) Julian Reister	6–2, 6–4
Loss	9.	17 September 2011	Sarajevo, Bosnia and Herzegovina	Clay	(Netherlands) Matwé Middelkoop	(Italy) Marco Crugnola (Spain) Rubén Ramírez Hidalgo	6–7^{(3–7)}, 6–3, [8–10]
