= BH Telecom Indoors =

Defunct tennis tournament
- Event name: Sarajevo
- Founded: 2003
- Abolished: 2013
- Editions: 11
- Location: Sarajevo, Bosnia and Herzegovina
- Venue: Olympic Hall Zetra
- Category: ATP Challenger Tour
- Surface: Hard (i)
- Draw: 32S/20Q/16D
- Website: Website

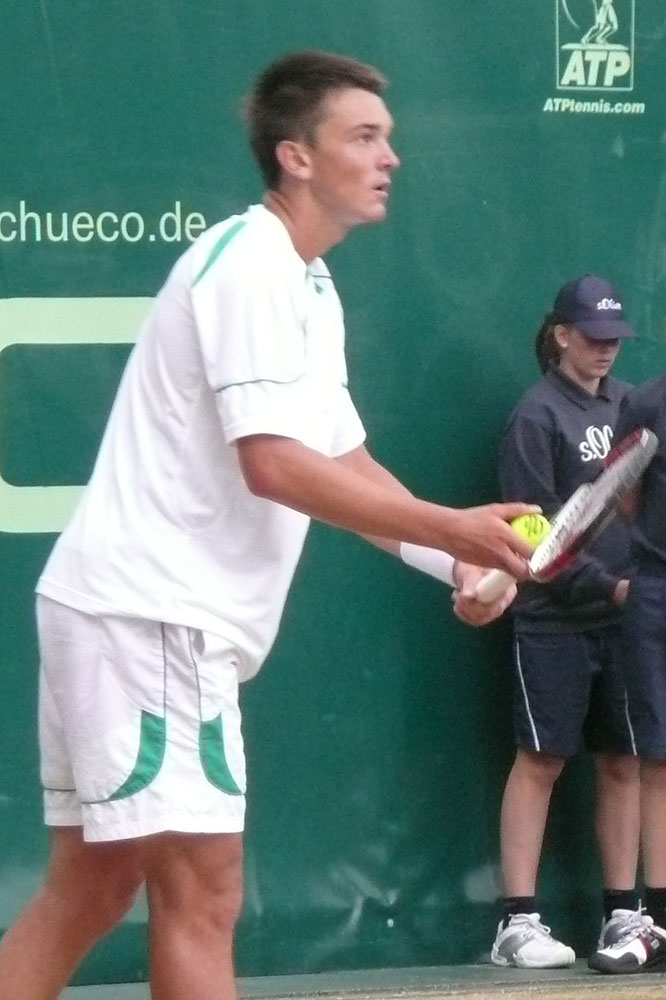
Andreas Beck from Germany won the singles twice, in 2006 and 2008

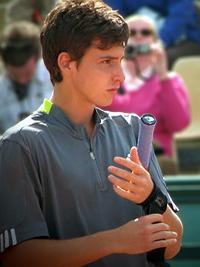
Latvian Ernests Gulbis won in singles and doubles in 2007, partnering Pavlovs

The BH Telecom Indoors was a professional tennis tournament played on indoor hardcourts. It was part of the ATP Challenger Tour. It was held annually in Sarajevo, Bosnia and Herzegovina each March since 2003.

Andreas Beck was the singles title holder with 2 wins, so as were Jaroslav Levinský and Jonathan Marray independently in doubles.

== Past finals ==
=== Singles ===
Year	Champion	Runner-up	Score
2013	(France) Adrian Mannarino	(Germany) Dustin Brown	7–6^{(7–3)}, 7–6^{(7–2)}
2012	(Czech Republic) Jan Hernych	(Czech Republic) Jan Mertl	6–3, 3–6, 7–6^{(7–5)}
2011	(Bosnia and Herzegovina) Amer Delić	(Slovakia) Karol Beck	walkover
2010	(France) Édouard Roger-Vasselin	(Slovakia) Karol Beck	6–7(5), 6–3, 1–0, ret.
2009	(Croatia) Ivan Dodig	(Germany) Dominik Meffert	6–4, 6–3
2008	(Germany) Andreas Beck (2)	(Austria) Alexander Peya	6–3, 7–6(8)
2007	(Latvia) Ernests Gulbis	(Czech Republic) Jan Mertl	4–6, 6–4, 7–6(2)
2006	(Germany) Andreas Beck (1)	(Sweden) Andreas Vinciguerra	2–6, 7–6(1), 7–6(6)
2005	(Belarus) Vladimir Voltchkov	(Slovakia) Michal Mertiňák	7–6(1), 6–3
2004	(Belgium) Gilles Elseneer	(Netherlands) Dennis van Scheppingen	7–6(5), 6–3
2003	(France) Richard Gasquet	(Belgium) Dick Norman	6–1, 7–6(7)

=== Doubles ===
Year	Champions	Runners-up	Score
2013	(Bosnia and Herzegovina) Mirza Bašić (Bosnia and Herzegovina) Tomislav Brkić	(Slovakia) Karol Beck (Slovakia) Igor Zelenay	6–3, 7–5
2012	(Germany) Dustin Brown (United Kingdom) Jonathan Marray (2)	(Slovakia) Michal Mertiňák (Slovakia) Igor Zelenay	7–6^{(7–2)}, 2–6, [11–9]
2011	(United Kingdom) Jamie Delgado (United Kingdom) Jonathan Marray (1)	(Switzerland) Yves Allegro (Germany) Andreas Beck	7–6(4), 6–2
2010	(France) Nicolas Mahut (France) Édouard Roger-Vasselin	(Croatia) Ivan Dodig (Czech Republic) Lukáš Rosol	7–6(6), 6–7(7), [10–5]
2009	(Russia) Konstantin Kravchuk (Poland) Dawid Olejniczak	(United Kingdom) James Auckland (Netherlands) Rogier Wassen	6–2, 3–6, 10–7
2008	(Sweden) Johan Brunström (Denmark) Frederik Nielsen	(Austria) Alexander Peya (Croatia) Lovro Zovko	6–4, 7–6(4)
2007	(Latvia) Ernests Gulbis (Latvia) Deniss Pavlovs	(Czech Republic) Jan Mertl (Czech Republic) Lukáš Rosol	6–4, 6–3
2006	(Serbia and Montenegro) Ilija Bozoljac (Serbia and Montenegro) Viktor Troicki	(Austria) Alexander Peya (Germany) Lars Uebel	6–3, 6–4
2005	(Slovakia) Michal Mertiňák (Ukraine) Sergiy Stakhovsky	(Czech Republic) Lukáš Dlouhý (Czech Republic) Jan Vacek	6–7(8), 6–2, 6–2
2004	(Czech Republic) Jaroslav Levinský (2) (Germany) Alexander Waske	(Finland) Tuomas Ketola (Sweden) Johan Landsberg	6–4, 6–1
2003	(Czech Republic) Tomáš Berdych (Czech Republic) Jaroslav Levinský (1)	(Sweden) Simon Aspelin (Sweden) Johan Landsberg	1–6, 7–6(6), 6–4
