= Ismar Gorčić =

Bosnian tennis player and coach

- Country (sports): Bosnia and Herzegovina
- Residence: Sarajevo, Bosnia and Herzegovina
- Born: 22 May 1983 (age 41); Sarajevo, SR Bosnia and Herzegovina, SFR Yugoslavia
- Turned pro: 2000
- Retired: 2015
- Plays: Right-handed (Double-handed backhand)
- Prize money: $67,256

Singles
- Career record: 1–2
- Career titles: 0
- Highest ranking: No. 443 (14 June 2004)

Doubles
- Career record: 1–5
- Career titles: 0
- Highest ranking: No. 296 (10 October 2005)

Ismar Gorčić (born 22 May 1983) is a Bosnian former professional tennis player. He is currently a tennis coach.

== Career statistics ==
=== Singles titles (0) ===
Legend
Challengers (0-0)
Futures (0–3)

Outcome	No.	Date	Tournament	Surface	Finals Opponent	Score
Runner-up	1.	5 December 2004	Megrine, Tunisia	Hard	(Slovenia) Boštjan Ošabnik	6–7, 2–6
Runner-up	2.	17 August 2009	Vinkovci, Croatia	Clay	(Croatia) Nikola Mektić	6–7, 6–7
Runner-up	3.	16 August 2010	Čakovec, Croatia	Clay	(Croatia) Kristijan Mesaroš	1–6, 1–4 ret.

=== Doubles titles (9) ===
Legend
Challengers (0–2)
Futures (9–13)

Outcome	No.	Date	Tournament	Surface	Partner	Finals Opponents	Score
Runner-up	1.	26 July 2004	Foligno, Italy	Clay	(Italy) Stefano Ianni	(Italy) Giancarlo Petrazzuolo (Italy) Stefano Mocci	6–4, 6–7, [5–7]
Winner	2.	3 August 2004	Sezze, Italy	Clay	(Italy) Giancarlo Petrazzuolo	(Czech Republic) Daniel Lustig (Russia) Mikhail Vasilie	6–4, 7–6
Runner-up	3.	25 July 2005	Foligno, Italy	Clay	(Italy) Marco Crugnola	(Italy) Filippo Figliomeni (Italy) Matteo Marrai	5–7, 2–6
Winner	4.	19 September 2005	Oristano, Italy	Hard	(Italy) Stefano Galvani	(Italy) Alessandro da Col (Italy) Fabio Colangelo	7–6, 7–6
Winner	5.	15 May 2006	Sarajevo, Bosnia and Herzegovina	Clay	(Italy) Mattia Livraghi	(Serbia and Montenegro) Dušan Mihajlović (Serbia and Montenegro) Goran Tošić	6–2, 6–2
Runner-up	6.	19 June 2006	L'Aquila, Italy	Clay	(Italy) Alessandro da Col	(Italy) Daniele Giorgini (Italy) Fabio Colangel	3–6, 2–6
Runner-up	7.	4 June 2007	Teramo, Italy	Clay	(Italy) Enrico Burzi	(Spain) Miquel Pérez (Uruguay) Marcel Felder	6–2, 3–6, 2–6
Runner-up	8.	18 June 2007	L'Aquila, Italy	Clay	(Italy) Claudio Grassi	(Romania) Adrian Gavrila (Romania) Artemon Apostu-Efremov	4–6, 6–7
Winner	9.	2 July 2007	Bologna, Italy	Clay	(Italy) Matteo Volante	(Italy) Giancarlo Petrazzuolo (Italy) Salvatore Carbone	6–3, 6–2
Runner-up	10.	14 July 2008	Palazzolo, Italy	Clay	(Italy) Alessandro Sarra	(Chile) Guillermo Hormazábal (Chile) Hans Podlipnik-Castillo	6–7, 2–6
Runner-up	11.	22 September 2008	Naples, Italy	Clay	(Italy) Antonio Maiorano	(Italy) Leonardo Azzaro (Italy) Alessandro Motti	7–6, 3–6, [7–10]
Runner-up	12.	19 January 2009	Eilat, Israel	Hard	(Croatia) Petar Jelenić	(Hungary) Attila Balázs (Israel) Amir Hadad	1–6, 0–6
Runner-up	13.	16 March 2009	Rome, Italy	Clay	(Italy) Damiano Di Ienno	(Italy) Daniele Giorgini (Italy) Luca Vanni	6–2, 5–6, [8–10]
Runner-up	14.	22 September 2008	Banja Luka, Bosnia and Herzegovina	Clay	(Italy) Simone Vagnozzi	(Austria) Rainer Eitzinger (Germany) Dustin Brown	4–6, 3–6
Runner-up	15.	19 October 2009	Dubrovnik, Croatia	Clay	(Bosnia and Herzegovina) Aldin Šetkić	(Croatia) Dino Marcan (Croatia) Marin Draganja	4–6, 6–2, [11–13]
Runner-up	16.	15 March 2010	Poreč, Croatia	Clay	(Hungary) Attila Balázs	(Spain) Carles Poch-Gradin (Italy) Matteo Viola	6–7, 4–6
Winner	17.	17 January 2011	Eilat, Israel	Hard	(Bosnia and Herzegovina) Damir Džumhur	(Canada) Steven Diez (Serbia) Nikola Čačić	6–3, 6–4
Runner-up	18.	30 May 2011	Kiseljak, Bosnia and Herzegovina	Clay	(Bosnia and Herzegovina) Damir Džumhur	(Croatia) Toni Androić (Serbia) Nikola Čačić	5–7, 4–6
Winner	19.	2 July 2012	Belgrade, Serbia	Clay	(Bosnia and Herzegovina) Aldin Šetkić	(Croatia) Matej Sabanov (Serbia) Ivan Bjelica	4–6, 6–2, [10–4]
Winner	20.	30 July 2012	Sombor, Serbia	Clay	(Bosnia and Herzegovina) Aldin Šetkić	(Croatia) Matej Sabanov (Serbia) Ivan Bjelica	6–2, 7–6
Runner-up	21.	10 June 2013	Doboj, Bosnia & Herzegovina	Clay	(Bosnia and Herzegovina) Nerman Fatić	(Bosnia and Herzegovina) Tomislav Brkić (Croatia) Duje Kekez	3-6, 4–6
Winner	22.	8 July 2013	Sharm El Sheikh, Egypt	Clay	(Bosnia and Herzegovina) Nerman Fatić	(Venezuela) Luis David Martínez (Netherlands) Mark Vervoort	6-3, 6–3
Winner	23.	15 July 2013	Sharm El Sheikh, Egypt	Clay	(Bosnia and Herzegovina) Nerman Fatić	(Tunisia) Skander Mansouri (Burundi) Hassan Ndayishimiye	6-3, 6–4
Runner-up	24.	5 August 2013	Novi Sad, Serbia	Clay	(Serbia) Ilija Vučić	(Bosnia and Herzegovina) Tomislav Brkić (Croatia) Duje Kekez	3-6, 6-7^{(1–7)}

== Sources ==
- Ismar Gorčić at the Association of Tennis Professionals
- Ismar Gorčić at the International Tennis Federation
