= 2010 Abierto Internacional del Bicentenario Leon – Singles =

Singles
- 2010 Abierto Internacional del Bicentenario Leon

Final
- Champion: (Mexico) Santiago González
- Runner-up: (Poland) Michał Przysiężny
- Score: 3–6, 6–1, 7–5

Events
| Singles | Doubles |
| ← 2009 · | Abierto Internacional del Bicentenario Leon | · 2011 → |

Dick Norman was the defending champion, but chose to compete in Monte Carlo instead.
Santiago González won in the final 3–6, 6–1, 7–5 against Michał Przysiężny.

== Seeds ==
1. (Poland) Michał Przysiężny (final)
2. (Australia) Greg Jones (semifinals)
3. (Germany) Andre Begemann (second round)
4. (India) Prakash Amritraj (quarterfinals)
5. (United States) Lester Cook (quarterfinals)
6. (Mexico) Santiago González (champion)
7. (Republic of Ireland) Conor Niland (second round)
8. (South Korea) Im Kyu-tae (quarterfinals)

== Draw ==
=== Key ===
- Q = Qualifier
- WC = Wild card
- LL = Lucky loser
- Alt = Alternate
- SE = Special exempt
- PR = Protected ranking
- ITF = ITF entry
- JE = Junior exempt
- w/o = Walkover
- r = Retired
- d = Defaulted
- SR = Special ranking

=== Finals ===
Semifinals
1 | (Poland) Michał Przysiężny | 7 | 6
(Dominican Republic) Víctor Estrella | 6^{2} | 0
6 | (Mexico) Santiago González | 6 | 7
2 | (Australia) Greg Jones | 4 | 6^{6}

Final
1 | (Poland) Michał Przysiężny | 6 | 1 | 5
6 | (Mexico) Santiago González | 3 | 6 | 7

=== Top half ===
First round
1 | (Poland) M Przysiężny | 6 | 6
Q | (United States) T Rettenmaier | 1 | 4
(United States) A Bogomolov Jr. | 6 | 6
WC | (Mexico) J-M Elizondo | 2 | 0
(Australia) R Junaid | 6 | 4 | 6^{4}
(Slovakia) I Klec | 3 | 6 | 7
WC | (Mexico) D Garza | 2 | 5
8 | (South Korea) K-t Im | 6 | 7
3 | (Germany) A Begemann | 4 | 6 | 6
(Mexico) B Rodríguez | 6 | 3 | 2
(Dominican Republic) V Estrella | 6 | 6
(Portugal) J Sousa | 3 | 2
(Australia) S Kadir | 1 | 2
Q | (Switzerland) R Valent | 6 | 6
(France) J-N Insausti | 3 | 1
7 | (Republic of Ireland) C Niland | 6 | 6

Second round
1 | (Poland) M Przysiężny | 4 | 6 | 6
(United States) A Bogomolov Jr. | 6 | 2 | 3
(Slovakia) I Klec | 3 | 6 | 6^{4}
8 | (South Korea) K-t Im | 6 | 4 | 7
3 | (Germany) A Begemann | 6^{4} | 7 | 5
(Dominican Republic) V Estrella | 7 | 6^{3} | 7
Q | (Switzerland) R Valent | 6 | 7
7 | (Republic of Ireland) C Niland | 4 | 6^{3}

Quarterfinals
1 | (Poland) M Przysiężny | 6 | 6
8 | (South Korea) K-t Im | 2 | 3
(Dominican Republic) V Estrella | 7 | 4 | 7
Q | (Switzerland) R Valent | 6^{5} | 6 | 5

Semifinals
1 | (Poland) M Przysiężny | 7 | 6
(Dominican Republic) V Estrella | 6^{2} | 0

=== Bottom half ===
First round
6 | (Mexico) S González | 6 | 6
Q | (Australia) K Hensel | 4 | 1
(Sweden) M Ryderstedt | 6 | 5 | 6
(New Zealand) J Statham | 3 | 7 | 4
(Canada) P-L Duclos | 6^{4} | 6^{9}
(Switzerland) A Sadecky | 7 | 7
WC | (Mexico) C Ramírez | 6 | 2 | 1
4 | (India) P Amritraj | 3 | 6 | 6
5 | (United States) L Cook | 6 | 6
WC | (Mexico) A Moreno | 3 | 3
(Australia) J Millman | 7 | 6
(Canada) V Pospisil | 5 | 1
(Mexico) M Gallardo Valles | 7 | 6^{3} | 1^{r}
(Australia) B Klein | 6^{3} | 7 | 3
Q | (Mexico) V Romero | 6^{5} | 6^{2}
2 | (Australia) G Jones | 7 | 7

Second round
6 | (Mexico) S González | 6 | 6
(Sweden) M Ryderstedt | 4 | 3
(Switzerland) A Sadecky | 2 | 0^{r}
4 | (India) P Amritraj | 6 | 1
5 | (United States) L Cook | 6 | 6
(Australia) J Millman | 4 | 3
(Australia) B Klein | 6^{5} | 6^{6}
2 | (Australia) G Jones | 7 | 7

Quarterfinals
6 | (Mexico) S González | 7 | 1 | 6
4 | (India) P Amritraj | 6^{11} | 6 | 4
5 | (United States) L Cook | 6 | 3 | r
2 | (Australia) G Jones | 4 | 6

Semifinals
6 | (Mexico) S González | 6 | 7
2 | (Australia) G Jones | 4 | 6^{6}
