= 2010 Abierto Internacional del Bicentenario Leon – Doubles =

Doubles
- 2010 Abierto Internacional del Bicentenario Leon

Final
- Champions: (Mexico) Santiago González (Canada) Vasek Pospisil
- Runners-up: (Australia) Kaden Hensel (Australia) Adam Hubble
- Score: 3–6, 6–3, [10–8]

Events
Singles	Doubles
← 2009 ·	Abierto Internacional del Bicentenario Leon	· 2011 →

Sanchai Ratiwatana and Sonchat Ratiwatana were the defending champions, but they chose to compete in Johannesburg instead.
Santiago González and Vasek Pospisil won in the final 3–6, 6–3, [10–8], against Kaden Hensel and Adam Hubble.

== Seeds ==
1. (Mexico) Santiago González / (Canada) Vasek Pospisil (champions)
2. (Australia) Kaden Hensel / (Australia) Adam Hubble (final)
3. (India) Prakash Amritraj / (United States) Lester Cook (first round)
4. (Germany) Andre Begemann / (Australia) Rameez Junaid (semifinals)

== Draw ==
=== Key ===
- Q = Qualifier
- WC = Wild card
- LL = Lucky loser
- Alt = Alternate
- SE = Special exempt
- PR = Protected ranking
- ITF = ITF entry
- JE = Junior exempt
- w/o = Walkover
- r = Retired
- d = Defaulted
- SR = Special ranking

=== Draw ===
First round
1	(Mexico) S González (Canada) V Pospisil	6	6
(United States) A Bogomolov Jr. (United States) T Rettenmaier	3	2
WC	(Mexico) J Harrera-Eguiluz (Mexico) M-A Sánchez	2	6	[5]
(Republic of Ireland) C Niland (Australia) N Roshan	6	4	[10]
3	(India) P Amritraj (United States) L Cook	6	1	[10]
WC	(Mexico) D Garza (France) J-N Insausti	3	6	[12]
WC	(Mexico) M Gallardo-Valles (Mexico) V Romero	2	4
(Canada) P-L Duclos (United States) N Monroe	6	6
(Australia) S Kadir (Sweden) M Ryderstedt	2	4
(Dominican Republic) V Estrella (Mexico) B Rodríguez	6	6
(Slovakia) I Klec (Poland) M Przysiężny	5	4
4	(Germany) A Begemann (Australia) R Junaid	7	6
(Mexico) J-M Elizondo (Mexico) C Ramírez	6^{2}	4
(Australia) G Jones (New Zealand) J Statham	7	6
(Chinese Taipei) KT Im (Switzerland) A Sadecky	1	2
2	(Australia) K Hensel (Australia) A Hubble	6	6

Quarterfinals
1	(Mexico) S González (Canada) V Pospisil	6	6
(Republic of Ireland) C Niland (Australia) N Roshan	1	4
WC	(Mexico) D Garza (France) J-N Insausti	5	6^{7}
(Canada) P-L Duclos (United States) N Monroe	7	7
(Dominican Republic) V Estrella (Mexico) B Rodríguez	6^{5}	4
4	(Germany) A Begemann (Australia) R Junaid	7	6
(Australia) G Jones (New Zealand) J Statham	1	2
2	(Australia) K Hensel (Australia) A Hubble	6	6

Semifinals
1	(Mexico) S González (Canada) V Pospisil	6^{3}	7	[10]
(Canada) P-L Duclos (United States) N Monroe	7	6^{7}	[8]
4	(Germany) A Begemann (Australia) R Junaid	5	7	[9]
2	(Australia) K Hensel (Australia) A Hubble	7	6^{3}	[11]

Finals
1	(Mexico) S González (Canada) V Pospisil	3	6	[10]
2	(Australia) K Hensel (Australia) A Hubble	6	3	[8]
