= 2019 BNP Paribas Sopot Open – Singles =

Singles
- 2019 BNP Paribas Sopot Open

Final
- Champion: (Italy) Stefano Travaglia
- Runner-up: (Slovakia) Filip Horanský
- Score: 6–4, 2–6, 6–2

Events
Singles	Doubles
← 2018 ·	BNP Paribas Sopot Open	· 2020 →

Paolo Lorenzi was the defending champion but lost in the quarterfinals to Aslan Karatsev.

Stefano Travaglia won the title after defeating Filip Horanský 6–4, 2–6, 6–2 in the final.

== Seeds ==
All seeds receive a bye into the second round.

1. (Italy) Stefano Travaglia (champion)
2. (Poland) Kamil Majchrzak (second round)
3. (Italy) Paolo Lorenzi (quarterfinals)
4. (Sweden) Mikael Ymer (third round)
5. (Italy) Lorenzo Giustino (second round)
6. (Belgium) Kimmer Coppejans (third round)
7. (Spain) Pedro Martínez (third round)
8. (Italy) Alessandro Giannessi (second round)
9. (Spain) Tommy Robredo (second round)
10. (Slovakia) Filip Horanský (final)
11. (Russia) Alexey Vatutin (quarterfinals)
12. (Egypt) Mohamed Safwat (quarterfinals)
13. (Czech Republic) Zdeněk Kolář (second round)
14. (France) Tristan Lamasine (semifinals)
15. (Estonia) Jürgen Zopp (third round)
16. (United Kingdom) Jan Choinski (quarterfinals)

== Draw ==
=== Key ===
- Q = Qualifier
- WC = Wild card
- LL = Lucky loser
- Alt = Alternate
- SE = Special exempt
- PR = Protected ranking
- ITF = ITF entry
- JE = Junior exempt
- w/o = Walkover
- r = Retired
- d = Defaulted
- SR = Special ranking

=== Finals ===
Quarterfinals
1	(Italy) Stefano Travaglia	6	6
12	(Egypt) Mohamed Safwat	4	4
14	(France) Tristan Lamasine	3	7	6
11	(Russia) Alexey Vatutin	6	5	2
(Russia) Aslan Karatsev	4	6	7^{7}
3	(Italy) Paolo Lorenzi	6	3	6^{4}
10	(Slovakia) Filip Horanský	6	6
16	(United Kingdom) Jan Choinski	1	0

Semifinals
1	(Italy) Stefano Travaglia	6	7
14	(France) Tristan Lamasine	1	5
(Russia) Aslan Karatsev	7	5	6^{7}
10	(Slovakia) Filip Horanský	5	7	7^{9}

Final
1	(Italy) Stefano Travaglia	6	2	6
10	(Slovakia) Filip Horanský	4	6	2

=== Top half ===
==== Section 1 ====
First round
WC	(Poland) M Przysiężny	2	5
WC	(Poland) D Michalski	6	7
(Kazakhstan) A Golubev	1	1
(Portugal) G Elias	6	6
(Italy) Fabrizio Ornago	6	3	7
(Russia) A Avidzba	3	6	5
WC	(Poland) Michał Dembek	0	3
(Argentina) F Mena	6	6

Second round
1	(Italy) S Travaglia	6	6
WC	(Poland) D Michalski	1	1
(Portugal) G Elias	6	3	6
13	(Czech Republic) Z Kolář	4	6	4
12	(Egypt) M Safwat	7^{7}	6
(Italy) F Ornago	6^{2}	2
(Argentina) F Mena	6^{1}	0
7	(Spain) P Martínez	7^{7}	6

Third round
1	(Italy) S Travaglia	6	6
(Portugal) G Elias	4	2
12	(Egypt) M Safwat	6	6
7	(Spain) P Martínez	3	4

Quarterfinals
1	(Italy) S Travaglia	6	6
12	(Egypt) M Safwat	4	4

==== Section 2 ====
First round
(Russia) I Gakhov	6	7
(Italy) J Berrettini	3	5
(Italy) M Bortolotti	3	1
(Italy) A Pellegrino	6	6
(Norway) V Durasovic	3	4
(Chinese Taipei) C-h Tseng	6	6
ITF	(Italy) R Bonadio	6^{1}	6^{2}
Q	(Russia) A Zhurbin	7^{7}	7^{7}

Second round
4/SE	(Sweden) M Ymer	6	6
(Russia) I Gakhov	2	3
(Italy) A Pellegrino	7	4	4
14	(France) T Lamasine	5	6	6
11	(Russia) A Vatutin	6	6
(Chinese Taipei) C-h Tseng	3	3
Q	(Russia) A Zhurbin	3	2
6	(Belgium) K Coppejans	6	6

Third round
4/SE	(Sweden) M Ymer	6	4	1
14	(France) T Lamasine	2	6	6
11	(Russia) A Vatutin	6	6
6	(Belgium) K Coppejans	4	2

Quarterfinals
14	(France) T Lamasine	3	7	6
11	(Russia) A Vatutin	6	5	2

=== Bottom half ===
==== Section 3 ====
First round
(Russia) A Karatsev	7	6
(Portugal) F Ferreira Silva	5	4
ITF	(Australia) C O'Connell	6	6
(Italy) E Dalla Valle	0	2
ITF	(Russia) I Nedelko	6	6
ITF	(Russia) E Tiurnev	3	2
(Uruguay) M Cuevas	7^{7}	6
(Germany) J Härteis	6^{5}	4

Second round
5	(Italy) L Giustino	6^{3}	3
(Russia) A Karatsev	7^{7}	6
ITF	(Australia) C O'Connell	6	7^{7}
9/WC	(Spain) T Robredo	4	6^{4}
15	(Estonia) J Zopp	6	6
ITF	(Russia) I Nedelko	2	1
(Uruguay) M Cuevas	3	1
3	(Italy) P Lorenzi	6	6

Third round
(Russia) A Karatsev	6	6
ITF	(Australia) C O'Connell	2	1
15	(Estonia) J Zopp	6	3	4
3	(Italy) P Lorenzi	2	6	6

Quarterfinals
(Russia) A Karatsev	4	6	7^{7}
3	(Italy) P Lorenzi	6	3	6^{4}

==== Section 4 ====
First round
WC	(Poland) K Żuk	3	1
PR	(Georgia (country)) A Metreveli	6	6
ITF	(Spain) J Barranco Cosano	6	7
(Croatia) A Pavić	4	5
(Bosnia and Herzegovina) T Brkić	7	6
Q	(Poland) Paweł Ciaś	5	4
(Brazil) P Sakamoto	3	3
(Germany) Jeremy Jahn	6	6

Second round
8	(Italy) A Giannessi	6	3	4
PR	(Georgia (country)) A Metreveli	4	6	6
ITF	(Spain) J Barranco Cosano	0	3
10	(Slovakia) F Horanský	6	6
16	(United Kingdom) J Choinski	3	6	6
(Bosnia and Herzegovina) T Brkić	6	4	3
(Germany) J Jahn	6^{5}	6	7
2	(Poland) K Majchrzak	7^{7}	1	5

Third round
PR	(Georgia (country)) A Metreveli	3	1
10	(Slovakia) F Horanský	6	6
16	(United Kingdom) J Choinski	6	6^{7}	6
(Germany) J Jahn	3	7^{9}	4

Quarterfinals
10	(Slovakia) F Horanský	6	6
16	(United Kingdom) J Choinski	1	0
