= 2011 Torneo Internacional AGT – Singles =

Singles
- 2011 Torneo Internacional AGT

Final
- Champion: (United States) Bobby Reynolds
- Runner-up: (Germany) Andre Begemann
- Score: 6–3, 6–3

Events
Singles	Doubles
← 2010 ·	Torneo Internacional AGT	· 2012 →

Santiago González was the defending champion, but chose not to compete.
Bobby Reynolds defeated Andre Begemann 6–3, 6–3 to claim the title.

== Seeds ==
1. (Italy) Paolo Lorenzi (second round)
2. (Japan) Tatsuma Ito (quarterfinals)
3. (United States) Bobby Reynolds (champion)
4. (United States) Rajeev Ram (quarterfinals)
5. (Dominican Republic) Víctor Estrella (second round)
6. (Brazil) Fernando Romboli (first round)
7. (France) Clément Reix (second round)
8. (United States) Nicholas Monroe (second round)

== Draw ==
=== Key ===
- Q = Qualifier
- WC = Wild card
- LL = Lucky loser
- Alt = Alternate
- SE = Special exempt
- PR = Protected ranking
- ITF = ITF entry
- JE = Junior exempt
- w/o = Walkover
- r = Retired
- d = Defaulted
- SR = Special ranking

=== Finals ===
Semifinals
(Moldova) Roman Borvanov	6^{3}	4
(Germany) Andre Begemann	7	6
3	(United States) Bobby Reynolds	7	4	6
(Canada) Vasek Pospisil	5	6	3

Final
(Germany) Andre Begemann	3	3
3	(United States) Bobby Reynolds	6	6

=== Top half ===
First round
1	(Italy) P Lorenzi	6	6
WC	(Mexico) J-M Elizondo	4	3
(Switzerland) A Sadecky	5	7	1
(Moldova) R Borvanov	7	6^{5}	6
Q	(United Kingdom) J Baker	6	6
(Uruguay) M Felder	2	4
(Switzerland) M Lammer	1	2
5	(Dominican Republic) V Estrella	6	6
4	(United States) R Ram	7	6
Q	(United Kingdom) C Eaton	5	4
WC	(Mexico) Fernando Larrea	3	1
WC	(Mexico) M Sánchez	6	6
(South Korea) W-s Jun	4	4
(Germany) A Begemann	6	6
WC	(Mexico) C Ramírez	2	2^{r}
8	(United States) N Monroe	6	4

Second round
1	(Italy) P Lorenzi	6	5	5
(Moldova) R Borvanov	4	7	7
Q	(United Kingdom) J Baker	7	6
5	(Dominican Republic) V Estrella	6^{4}	1
4	(United States) R Ram	6	6
WC	(Mexico) M Sánchez	3	3
(Germany) A Begemann	6	6
8	(United States) N Monroe	3	4

Quarterfinals
(Moldova) R Borvanov	6	6
Q	(United Kingdom) J Baker	0	4
4	(United States) R Ram	6	6^{5}	2
(Germany) A Begemann	3	7	6

Semifinals
(Moldova) R Borvanov	6^{3}	4
(Germany) A Begemann	7	6

=== Bottom half ===
First round
7	(France) C Reix	6	6
Q	(Austria) N Moser	4	3
(France) L Walter	1	6^{4}
Q	(Guatemala) C Díaz Figueroa	6	7
(Brazil) D Dutra da Silva	1	7	3
(Sweden) M Ryderstedt	6	6^{6}	1^{r}
(New Zealand) M Venus	3	2
3	(United States) B Reynolds	6	6
6	(Brazil) F Romboli	2	0
(Canada) V Pospisil	6	6
(United Kingdom) D Cox	3	5
(Ecuador) JC Campozano	6	3^{r}
(South Korea) D Yoo	6	4	6
(United States) K Kim	3	6	2
(United States) A El Mihdawy	6^{7}	4
2	(Japan) T Ito	7	6

Second round
7	(France) C Reix	3	4
Q	(Guatemala) C Díaz Figueroa	6	6
(Brazil) D Dutra da Silva	2	2
3	(United States) B Reynolds	6	6
(Canada) V Pospisil	6	6
(United Kingdom) D Cox	3	1
(South Korea) D Yoo	2	3
2	(Japan) T Ito	6	6

Quarterfinals
Q	(Guatemala) C Díaz Figueroa	2	3
3	(United States) B Reynolds	6	6
(Canada) V Pospisil	6	6
2	(Japan) T Ito	3	4

Semifinals
3	(United States) B Reynolds	7	4	6
(Canada) V Pospisil	5	6	3
