= 2019 BNP Paribas Sopot Open – Doubles =

Doubles
- 2019 BNP Paribas Sopot Open

Final
- Champions: (Germany) Andre Begemann (Romania) Florin Mergea
- Runners-up: (Poland) Karol Drzewiecki (Poland) Mateusz Kowalczyk
- Score: 6–1, 3–6, [10–8]

Events
Singles	Doubles
← 2018 ·	BNP Paribas Sopot Open	· 2020 →

Mateusz Kowalczyk and Szymon Walków were the defending champions but chose to defend their title with different partners. Kowalczyk partnered Karol Drzewiecki but lost in the final to Andre Begemann and Florin Mergea. Walków partnered Marcin Matkowski but lost in the first round to Jeremy Jahn and Pedro Martínez.

Begemann and Mergea won the title after defeating Drzewiecki and Kowalczyk 6–1, 3–6, [10–8] in the final.

== Seeds ==
1. (Bosnia and Herzegovina) Tomislav Brkić / (Croatia) Ante Pavić (quarterfinals)
2. (Italy) Andrea Pellegrino / (Netherlands) Mark Vervoort (first round)
3. (Kazakhstan) Andrey Golubev / (Czech Republic) Zdeněk Kolář (first round)
4. (Poland) Marcin Matkowski / (Poland) Szymon Walków (first round)

== Draw ==
=== Key ===
- Q = Qualifier
- WC = Wild card
- LL = Lucky loser
- Alt = Alternate
- SE = Special exempt
- PR = Protected ranking
- ITF = ITF entry
- JE = Junior exempt
- w/o = Walkover
- r = Retired
- d = Defaulted
- SR = Special ranking

First round
1	(Bosnia and Herzegovina) T Brkić (Croatia) A Pavić	4	6	[10]
WC	(Poland) J Zieliński (Poland) K Żuk	6	1	[8]
(Uruguay) M Cuevas (Argentina) F Mena	4	6	[6]
(Germany) A Begemann (Romania) F Mergea	6	3	[10]
4	(Poland) M Matkowski (Poland) S Walków	3	3
(Germany) Jeremy Jahn (Spain) P Martínez	6	6
ITF	(Italy) M Bortolotti (Australia) C O'Connell	6	6
(Georgia (country)) A Metreveli (Russia) A Vatutin	3	3
ITF	(Spain) J Barranco Cosano (Peru) A Merino	w/o
Alt	(Russia) I Nedelko (Russia) E Tiurnev
WC	(Poland) K Drzewiecki (Poland) M Kowalczyk	7	6
3	(Kazakhstan) A Golubev (Czech Republic) Z Kolář	5	4
(Italy) J Berrettini (Italy) R Bonadio	2	1
(United States) H Johnson (United States) Y Johnson	6	6
(Russia) I Gakhov (Russia) A Karatsev	7^{7}	6
2	(Italy) A Pellegrino (Netherlands) M Vervoort	6^{5}	1

Quarterfinals
1	(Bosnia and Herzegovina) T Brkić (Croatia) A Pavić	2	6	[8]
(Germany) A Begemann (Romania) F Mergea	6	3	[10]
(Germany) J Jahn (Spain) P Martínez	3	4
ITF	(Italy) M Bortolotti (Australia) C O'Connell	6	6
ITF	(Spain) J Barranco Cosano (Peru) A Merino	6	6^{1}	[8]
WC	(Poland) K Drzewiecki (Poland) M Kowalczyk	4	7^{7}	[10]
(United States) H Johnson (United States) Y Johnson	6^{4}	7^{7}	[7]
(Russia) I Gakhov (Russia) A Karatsev	7^{7}	6^{4}	[10]

Semifinals
(Germany) A Begemann (Romania) F Mergea	6	6
ITF	(Italy) M Bortolotti (Australia) C O'Connell	3	4
WC	(Poland) K Drzewiecki (Poland) M Kowalczyk	4	6	[10]
(Russia) I Gakhov (Russia) A Karatsev	6	1	[7]

Final
(Germany) A Begemann (Romania) F Mergea	6	3	[10]
WC	(Poland) K Drzewiecki (Poland) M Kowalczyk	1	6	[8]
