= 2016 Abierto de Puebla – Doubles =

Doubles
- 2016 Abierto de Puebla

Final
- Champions: (New Zealand) Marcus Daniell (New Zealand) Artem Sitak
- Runners-up: (Mexico) Santiago González (Croatia) Mate Pavić
- Score: 3–6, 6–2, [12–10]

Events
Singles	Doubles
← 2009 ·	Abierto de Puebla	· 2017 →

This was the first edition of the tournament since 2009.

Marcus Daniell and Artem Sitak won the title, defeating Santiago González and Mate Pavić 3–6, 6–2, [12–10] in the final.

== Seeds ==
1. (Mexico) Santiago González / (Croatia) Mate Pavić (final)
2. (Argentina) Guillermo Durán / (Argentina) Horacio Zeballos (first round)
3. (New Zealand) Marcus Daniell / (New Zealand) Artem Sitak (champions)
4. (Germany) Gero Kretschmer / (Germany) Alexander Satschko (quarterfinals)

== Draw ==
=== Key ===
- Q = Qualifier
- WC = Wild card
- LL = Lucky loser
- Alt = Alternate
- SE = Special exempt
- PR = Protected ranking
- ITF = ITF entry
- JE = Junior exempt
- w/o = Walkover
- r = Retired
- d = Defaulted
- SR = Special ranking

First round
1	(Mexico) S González (Croatia) M Pavić	6	7^{7}
(Argentina) G Andreozzi (Argentina) A Molteni	4	6^{0}
WC	(Mexico) Mauricio Astorga (Mexico) M Sánchez	6	6
(Uruguay) A Behar (Italy) A Motti	3	4
4	(Germany) G Kretschmer (Germany) A Satschko	7^{7}	7^{7}
(Brazil) A Ghem (Brazil) J Souza	6^{3}	6^{1}
(Peru) S Galdós (Brazil) F Neis	6	4	[6]
WC	(Mexico) H Hach Verdugo (Mexico) L Patiño	4	6	[10]
(India) P Raja (South Africa) R Roelofse	6	6
(South Africa) D O'Brien (Mexico) MÁ Reyes-Varela	3	4
(Canada) A Shamasdin (India) D Sharan	3	6^{5}
3	(New Zealand) M Daniell (New Zealand) A Sitak	6	7^{7}
(Colombia) N Barrientos (Colombia) A Falla	6^{5}	5
WC	(Mexico) D Garza (Mexico) T Hank	7^{7}	7
(Germany) B Becker (Spain) A Menéndez-Maceiras	6	3	[10]
2	(Argentina) G Durán (Argentina) H Zeballos	4	6	[6]

Quarterfinals
1	(Mexico) S González (Croatia) M Pavić	6	7
WC	(Mexico) M Astorga (Mexico) M Sánchez	3	5
4	(Germany) G Kretschmer (Germany) A Satschko	6	6^{2}	[9]
WC	(Mexico) H Hach Verdugo (Mexico) L Patiño	4	7^{7}	[11]
(India) P Raja (South Africa) R Roelofse	6	3	[8]
3	(New Zealand) M Daniell (New Zealand) A Sitak	4	6	[10]
WC	(Mexico) D Garza (Mexico) T Hank	4	7	[7]
(Germany) B Becker (Spain) A Menéndez-Maceiras	6	5	[10]

Semifinals
1	(Mexico) S González (Croatia) M Pavić	1	7^{7}	[10]
WC	(Mexico) H Hach Verdugo (Mexico) L Patiño	6	6^{5}	[7]
3	(New Zealand) M Daniell (New Zealand) A Sitak	7^{7}	2	[10]
(Germany) B Becker (Spain) A Menéndez-Maceiras	6^{3}	6	[7]

Final
1	(Mexico) S González (Croatia) M Pavić	6	2	[10]
3	(New Zealand) M Daniell (New Zealand) A Sitak	3	6	[12]
