= 2009 Abierto Internacional Varonil Club Casablanca – Singles =

Singles
- 2009 Abierto Internacional Varonil Club Casablanca

Final
- Champion: (Belgium) Dick Norman
- Runner-up: (Uruguay) Marcel Felder
- Score: 6–4, 6–7(6), 7–5

Events
Singles	Doubles
← 2008 ·	Abierto Internacional Varonil Club Casablanca	· 2010 →

Dawid Olejniczak was the defending champion, but lost to Im Kyu-tae in quarterfinals.
The qualifier Dick Norman won in the final 6–4, 6–7(6), 7–5, against Marcel Felder.

== Seeds ==
1. (United States) Kevin Kim (first round, retired)
2. (Canada) Frank Dancevic (first round)
3. (Japan) Go Soeda (first round)
4. (Argentina) Horacio Zeballos (second round)
5. (Thailand) Danai Udomchoke (semifinals)
6. (Colombia) Santiago Giraldo (second round)
7. (Brazil) Franco Ferreiro (second round)
8. (India) Prakash Amritraj (quarterfinals)

== Draw ==
=== Key ===
- Q = Qualifier
- WC = Wild card
- LL = Lucky loser
- Alt = Alternate
- SE = Special exempt
- PR = Protected ranking
- ITF = ITF entry
- JE = Junior exempt
- w/o = Walkover
- r = Retired
- d = Defaulted
- SR = Special ranking

=== Final four ===
Semifinals
Q	(Uruguay) Marcel Felder	7	3	6
5	(Thailand) Danai Udomchoke	5	6	4
Q	(Belgium) Dick Norman	6	6
(South Korea) Im Kyu-tae	4	1

Final
Q	(Uruguay) Marcel Felder	4	7	5
Q	(Belgium) Dick Norman	6	6^{6}	7

=== Top half ===
First round
1	(United States) K Kim	1	r
WC	(Mexico) B Rodríguez	4
(Switzerland) M Lammer	6	6
Q	(Germany) M Bachinger	4	2
Q	(Uruguay) M Felder	7	6
WC	(Mexico) C Ramírez	5	2
(Colombia) A Falla	4	6	2
7	(Brazil) F Ferreiro	6	1	6
3	(Japan) G Soeda	2	2
(Ecuador) G Lapentti	6	6
(United Kingdom) J Goodall	4	7	6
(Italy) P Lorenzi	6	5	4
(Austria) M Fischer	4	4
(Brazil) J Souza	6	6
(United States) M Yani	3	6^{5}
5	(Thailand) D Udomchoke	6	7

Second round
WC	(Mexico) B Rodríguez	1	3
(Switzerland) M Lammer	6	6
Q	(Uruguay) M Felder	4	6	3
7	(Brazil) F Ferreiro	6	3	0^{r}
(Ecuador) G Lapentti	6	6
(United Kingdom) J Goodall	4	2
(Brazil) J Souza	4	7	3
5	(Thailand) D Udomchoke	6	6^{5}	6

Quarterfinals
(Switzerland) M Lammer	6	5	6^{7}
Q	(Uruguay) M Felder	3	7	7
(Ecuador) G Lapentti	6^{5}	6^{3}
5	(Thailand) D Udomchoke	7	7

Semifinals
Q	(Uruguay) M Felder	7	3	6
5	(Thailand) D Udomchoke	5	6	4

=== Bottom half ===
First round
8	(India) P Amritraj	0	6	6
(Italy) R Ghedin	6	1	3
(Mexico) S González	3	6	6
(Australia) M Matosevic	6	3	3
Q	(Belgium) D Norman	6	6
(Dominican Republic) V Estrella	2	1
WC	(Slovenia) B Puc	2	4
4	(Argentina) H Zeballos	6	6
6	(Colombia) S Giraldo	6	6
LL	(Belgium) N Desein	3	2
(Poland) D Olejniczak	7	6
(Brazil) A Miele	5	3
Q	(France) V Millot	6	6
WC	(Mexico) V Romero	4	4
(South Korea) K-t Im	7	6^{3}	6
2	(Canada) F Dancevic	6^{9}	7	0

Second round
8	(India) P Amritraj	6	6
(Mexico) S González	2	3
Q	(Belgium) D Norman	7	6^{15}	6
4	(Argentina) H Zeballos	6^{4}	7	3
6	(Colombia) S Giraldo	4	5
(Poland) D Olejniczak	6	7
Q	(France) V Millot	1	7	3
(South Korea) K-t Im	6	6^{5}	6

Quarterfinals
8	(India) P Amritraj	4	3
Q	(Belgium) D Norman	6	6
(Poland) D Olejniczak	4	1	r
(South Korea) K-t Im	6	3

Semifinals
Q	(Belgium) D Norman	6	6
(South Korea) K-t Im	4	1
