= 2009 Abierto Internacional Varonil Club Casablanca – Doubles =

Doubles
- 2009 Abierto Internacional Varonil Club Casablanca

Final
- Champions: (Thailand) Sanchai Ratiwatana (Thailand) Sonchat Ratiwatana
- Runners-up: (Dominican Republic) Víctor Estrella (Brazil) João Souza
- Score: 6–3, 6–3

Events
Singles	Doubles
← 2008 ·	Abierto Internacional Varonil Club Casablanca	· 2010 →

Carsten Ball and Robert Smeets were the defenders of championship title, but they chose not to defend their 2009 win.
Sanchai Ratiwatana and Sonchat Ratiwatana defeated Víctor Estrella and João Souza (6–3, 6–3).

== Seeds ==
1. (India) Prakash Amritraj / (United States) David Martin (first round)
2. (Austria) Martin Fischer / (Belgium) Dick Norman (first round)
3. (Mexico) Santi González / (Argentina) Horacio Zeballos (semifinals)
4. (Thailand) Sanchai Ratiwatana / (Thailand) Sonchat Ratiwatana (champions)

== Draw ==
=== Key ===
- Q = Qualifier
- WC = Wild card
- LL = Lucky loser
- Alt = Alternate
- SE = Special exempt
- PR = Protected ranking
- ITF = ITF entry
- JE = Junior exempt
- w/o = Walkover
- r = Retired
- d = Defaulted
- SR = Special ranking

=== Draw ===
First round
1	(India) P Amritraj (United States) D Martin	6	6^{5}	[10]
(Mexico) B Echagaray (Ecuador) G Lapentti	3	7	[12]
WC	(Uruguay) M Felder (Mexico) LM Flores	2
(Colombia) A Falla (Colombia) S Giraldo	3	r
4	(Thailand) Sa Ratiwatana (Thailand) So Ratiwatana	2
(South Korea) KT Im (United States) K Kim	3	r
WC	(Mexico) D Garza (Colombia) M Quintero	4	6^{5}
WC	(Mexico) JM Elizondo (Mexico) C Ramírez	6	7
(Germany) M Bachinger (Switzerland) M Lammer	6	6
(Italy) R Ghedin (Italy) P Lorenzi	3	3
(Australia) M Matosevic (Thailand) D Udomchoke	4	4
3	(Mexico) S González (Argentina) H Zeballos	6	6
(Dominican Republic) V Estrella (Brazil) J Souza	6^{5}	7	[10]
(Colombia) JS Cabal (Colombia) C Salamanca	7	6^{5}	[7]
(United Kingdom) J Goodall (Poland) D Olejniczak	7	6
2	(Austria) M Fischer (Belgium) D Norman	5	3

Quarterfinals
(Mexico) B Echagaray (Ecuador) G Lapentti	4	6	[4]
WC	(Uruguay) M Felder (Mexico) LM Flores	6	4	[10]
4	(Thailand) Sa Ratiwatana (Thailand) So Ratiwatana	7	6
WC	(Mexico) JM Elizondo (Mexico) C Ramírez	6^{3}	4
(Germany) M Bachinger (Switzerland) M Lammer	w/o
3	(Mexico) S González (Argentina) H Zeballos
(Dominican Republic) V Estrella (Brazil) J Souza	6	7
(United Kingdom) J Goodall (Poland) D Olejniczak	4	6^{5}

Semifinals
WC	(Uruguay) M Felder (Mexico) LM Flores	0	3
4	(Thailand) Sa Ratiwatana (Thailand) So Ratiwatana	6	6
3	(Mexico) S González (Argentina) H Zeballos	2	1
(Dominican Republic) V Estrella (Brazil) J Souza	6	6

Finals
4	(Thailand) Sa Ratiwatana (Thailand) So Ratiwatana	6	6
(Dominican Republic) V Estrella (Brazil) J Souza	3	3
