= 2016 Abierto de Puebla – Singles =

Singles
- 2016 Abierto de Puebla

Final
- Champion: (Colombia) Eduardo Struvay
- Runner-up: (Serbia) Peđa Krstin
- Score: 4–6, 6–4, 6–4

Events
Singles	Doubles
← 2009 ·	Abierto de Puebla	· 2017 →

This was the first edition of the tournament since 2009.

Eduardo Struvay won the title, defeating Peđa Krstin 4–6, 6–4, 6–4 in the final.

== Seeds ==
1. (Germany) Benjamin Becker (semifinals)
2. (Tunisia) Malek Jaziri (first round)
3. (Argentina) Horacio Zeballos (second round)
4. (Colombia) Alejandro Falla (first round)
5. (Brazil) André Ghem (second round)
6. (Spain) Adrián Menéndez-Maceiras (first round)
7. (United Kingdom) James Ward (second round)
8. (Argentina) Guido Andreozzi (first round)

== Draw ==
=== Key ===
- Q = Qualifier
- WC = Wild card
- LL = Lucky loser
- Alt = Alternate
- SE = Special exempt
- PR = Protected ranking
- ITF = ITF entry
- JE = Junior exempt
- w/o = Walkover
- r = Retired
- d = Defaulted
- SR = Special ranking

=== Finals ===
Semifinals
1	(Germany) Benjamin Becker	6	3	6^{2}
(Serbia) Peđa Krstin	4	6	7^{7}
Q	(Argentina) Agustín Velotti	3	3
(Colombia) Eduardo Struvay	6	6

Final
(Serbia) Peđa Krstin	6	4	4
(Colombia) Eduardo Struvay	4	6	6

=== Top half ===
First round
1	(Germany) B Becker	6	6^{5}	6
(Argentina) P Cachin	3	7^{7}	4
(Austria) B Trinker	3	6	1
Alt	(Czech Republic) Robin Staněk	6	3	6
(Colombia) N Barrientos	5	6	6^{0}
(Belgium) Y Reuter	7	3	7^{7}
(Brazil) J Souza	6^{2}	6	6
8	(Argentina) G Andreozzi	7^{7}	1	2
3	(Argentina) H Zeballos	7^{7}	7^{7}
WC	(Mexico) H Hach Verdugo	6^{2}	6^{5}
WC	(Mexico) L Gómez	7	3	4
(Serbia) P Krstin	5	6	6
WC	(Mexico) L Patiño	3	1
Q	(Italy) S Napolitano	6	6
(Lithuania) L Grigelis	4	6^{9}
5	(Brazil) A Ghem	6	7^{11}

Second round
1	(Germany) B Becker	6	6
Alt	(Czech Republic) R Staněk	2	4
(Belgium) Y Reuter	4	2
(Brazil) J Souza	6	6
3	(Argentina) H Zeballos	4	2
(Serbia) P Krstin	6	6
Q	(Italy) S Napolitano	3	7^{7}	6
5	(Brazil) A Ghem	6	6^{5}	2

Quarterfinals
1	(Germany) B Becker	7	6
(Brazil) J Souza	5	2
(Serbia) P Krstin	7^{7}	6^{5}	7
Q	(Italy) S Napolitano	6^{1}	7^{7}	5

Semifinals
1	(Germany) B Becker	6	3	6^{2}
(Serbia) P Krstin	4	6	7^{7}

=== Bottom half ===
First round
6	(Spain) A Menéndez-Maceiras	6^{3}	6	3
Q	(Argentina) A Velotti	7^{7}	4	6
(Austria) D Novak	7^{7}	6
WC	(Mexico) T Hank	6^{4}	4
(Italy) L Giustino	6^{3}	3
(Italy) M Donati	7^{7}	6
Q	(Australia) M Matosevic	6	7^{7}
4	(Colombia) A Falla	4	6^{4}
7	(United Kingdom) J Ward	6	3	6
(Italy) F Gaio	1	6	3
(Colombia) E Struvay	7^{7}	7^{7}
Q	(Argentina) A Molteni	6^{4}	6^{1}
(Serbia) N Milojević	2	7^{10}	6
(United States) D Nguyen	6	6^{8}	4
(Serbia) L Djere	7	5	6
2	(Tunisia) M Jaziri	5	7	2

Second round
Q	(Argentina) A Velotti	6	6
(Austria) D Novak	2	2
(Italy) M Donati	6	4	3
Q	(Australia) M Matosevic	3	6	6
7	(United Kingdom) J Ward	3	3
(Colombia) E Struvay	6	6
(Serbia) N Milojević	6	7^{7}
(Serbia) L Djere	1	6^{2}

Quarterfinals
Q	(Argentina) A Velotti	6	7
Q	(Australia) M Matosevic	4	5
(Colombia) E Struvay	6	1	6
(Serbia) N Milojević	3	6	4

Semifinals
Q	(Argentina) A Velotti	3	3
(Colombia) E Struvay	6	6
