= 2009 Challenger Varonil Britania Zavaleta – Doubles =

Doubles
- 2009 Challenger Varonil Britania Zavaleta

Final
- Champions: (Canada) Vasek Pospisil (Canada) Adil Shamasdin
- Runners-up: (Spain) Guillermo Olaso (Spain) Pere Riba
- Score: 7–6(7), 6–0

Events
Singles	Doubles
← 2008 ·	Challenger Varonil Britania Zavaleta	· 2010 →

Nicholas Monroe and Eric Nunez were the defending champions, but decided to not compete this year.
Vasek Pospisil and Adil Shamasdin defeated Guillermo Olaso and Pere Riba 7–6(7), 6–0 in the final.

== Seeds ==
1. (Germany) Martin Emmrich / (Sweden) Andreas Siljeström (first round)
2. (Mexico) Daniel Garza / (Mexico) Santiago González (quarterfinals)
3. (United Kingdom) Jamie Delgado / (United States) John Paul Fruttero (quarterfinals)
4. (Brazil) Marcelo Demoliner / (Brazil) Márcio Torres (semifinals)

== Draw ==
=== Key ===
- Q = Qualifier
- WC = Wild card
- LL = Lucky loser
- Alt = Alternate
- SE = Special exempt
- PR = Protected ranking
- ITF = ITF entry
- JE = Junior exempt
- w/o = Walkover
- r = Retired
- d = Defaulted
- SR = Special ranking

=== Draw ===
First round
1	(Germany) M Emmrich (Sweden) A Siljeström	4	6	[8]
(Mexico) B Rodríguez (Mexico) V Romero	6	2	[10]
(Portugal) P Sousa (Portugal) L Tavares	w/o
ALT	(United Kingdom) J Baker (Australia) N Roshan
3	(United Kingdom) J Delgado (United States) JP Fruttero	6	4	[10]
(Spain) A Menéndez-Maceiras (Spain) C Poch-Gradin	3	6	[8]
(Spain) G Olaso (Spain) P Riba	6	2	[10]
(Mexico) J Herrera-Eguiluz (Mexico) C Ramírez	3	6	[6]
(Philippines) TC Huey (South Africa) R Klaasen	6^{4}	6	[10]
(Germany) A Begemann (Austria) R Eitzinger	7	4	[8]
WC	(Mexico) G Arroyo (Mexico) E Peralta-Tello	6^{3}	0
4	(Brazil) M Demoliner (Brazil) M Torres	7	6
(Canada) V Pospisil (Canada) A Shamasdin	6	6
(Mexico) B Echagaray (Mexico) M Gallardo-Valles	4	2
(Spain) J Checa-Calvo (Spain) F Vicente	2	4
2	(Mexico) D Garza (Mexico) S González	6	6

Quarterfinals
WC	(Mexico) B Rodríguez (Mexico) V Romero	5	2
ALT	(United Kingdom) J Baker (Australia) N Roshan	7	6
3	(United Kingdom) J Delgado (United States) JP Fruttero	6	1	[8]
(Spain) G Olaso (Spain) P Riba	2	6	[10]
(Philippines) TC Huey (South Africa) R Klaasen	6	6^{3}	[6]
4	(Brazil) M Demoliner (Brazil) M Torres	3	7	[10]
(Canada) V Pospisil (Canada) A Shamasdin	6	5	[10]
2	(Mexico) D Garza (Mexico) S González	3	7	[7]

Semifinals
ALT	(United Kingdom) J Baker (Australia) N Roshan	5	6	[6]
(Spain) G Olaso (Spain) P Riba	7	1	[10]
4	(Brazil) M Demoliner (Brazil) M Torres	1	4
(Canada) V Pospisil (Canada) A Shamasdin	6	6

Final
(Spain) G Olaso (Spain) P Riba	6^{7}	0
(Canada) V Pospisil (Canada) A Shamasdin	7	6
