= 2011 Torneo Internacional AGT – Doubles =

Doubles
- 2011 Torneo Internacional AGT

Final
- Champions: (United States) Rajeev Ram (United States) Bobby Reynolds
- Runners-up: (Germany) Andre Begemann (United Kingdom) Chris Eaton
- Score: 6–3, 6–2

Events
Singles	Doubles
← 2010 ·	Torneo Internacional AGT	· 2012 →

Santiago González and Vasek Pospisil were the defending champions; however, González decided not to participate.
Pospisil played alongside Nicholas Monroe, but they lost to Andre Begemann and Chris Eaton in the semifinals.
First seeds Rajeev Ram and Bobby Reynolds defeated second seeds Begemann and Eaton 6–3, 6–2, to claim this year's title.

== Seeds ==
1. (United States) Rajeev Ram / (United States) Bobby Reynolds (champions)
2. (Germany) Andre Begemann / (United Kingdom) Chris Eaton (final)
3. (United States) Nicholas Monroe / (Canada) Vasek Pospisil (semifinals)
4. (Uruguay) Marcel Felder / (Italy) Paolo Lorenzi (quarterfinals)

== Draw ==
=== Key ===
- Q = Qualifier
- WC = Wild card
- LL = Lucky loser
- Alt = Alternate
- SE = Special exempt
- PR = Protected ranking
- ITF = ITF entry
- JE = Junior exempt
- w/o = Walkover
- r = Retired
- d = Defaulted
- SR = Special ranking

=== Draw ===
First round
1	(United States) R Ram (United States) B Reynolds	6	6
WC	(Mexico) Fernando Larrea (Mexico) M Sánchez	1	3
(France) Clément Reix (France) L Walter	7	6
(United States) A El Mihdawy (New Zealand) M Venus	6^{4}	4
4	(Uruguay) M Felder (Italy) P Lorenzi	6	5	[10]
WC	(Mexico) J-M Elizondo (Mexico) C Ramírez	2	7	[8]
(Mexico) L Díaz-Barriga (Mexico) MÁ Reyes-Varela	6	6
(Switzerland) M Lammer (Switzerland) A Sadecky	0	4
(Austria) N Moser (South Korea) D Yoo
(South Korea) W-s Jun (United States) K Kim	w/o
WC	(Mexico) Edgar López (Mexico) E Peralta-Tello	1	4
3	(United States) N Monroe (Canada) V Pospisil	6	6
(Ecuador) JC Campozano (Brazil) D Dutra da Silva	w/o
(Moldova) E Borvanov (United Kingdom) D Cox
(Dominican Republic) V Estrella (Brazil) F Romboli	3	4
2	(Germany) A Begemann (United Kingdom) C Eaton	6	6

Quarterfinals
1	(United States) R Ram (United States) B Reynolds	4	6	[10]
(France) Clément Reix (France) L Walter	6	1	[4]
4	(Uruguay) M Felder (Italy) P Lorenzi	7	5	[9]
(Mexico) L Díaz-Barriga (Mexico) MÁ Reyes-Varela	6^{7}	7	[11]
(Austria) N Moser (South Korea) D Yoo	2	6^{2}
3	(United States) N Monroe (Canada) V Pospisil	6	7
(Moldova) E Borvanov (United Kingdom) D Cox	5	4
2	(Germany) A Begemann (United Kingdom) C Eaton	7	6

Semifinals
1	(United States) R Ram (United States) B Reynolds	6	3	[10]
(Mexico) L Díaz-Barriga (Mexico) MÁ Reyes-Varela	4	6	[6]
3	(United States) N Monroe (Canada) V Pospisil	3	5
2	(Germany) A Begemann (United Kingdom) C Eaton	6	7

Final
1	(United States) R Ram (United States) B Reynolds	6	6
2	(Germany) A Begemann (United Kingdom) C Eaton	3	2
