= 2018 Sopot Open – Doubles =

Doubles
- 2018 Sopot Open

Final
- Champions: (Poland) Mateusz Kowalczyk (Poland) Szymon Walków
- Runners-up: (Philippines) Ruben Gonzales (United States) Nathaniel Lammons
- Score: 7–6^{(8–6)}, 6–3

Events
Singles	Doubles
Sopot Open	· 2019 →

This was the first edition of the tournament.

Mateusz Kowalczyk and Szymon Walków won the title after defeating Ruben Gonzales and Nathaniel Lammons 7–6^{(8–6)}, 6–3 in the final.

== Seeds ==
1. (Belarus) Aliaksandr Bury / (Germany) Andreas Mies (first round)
2. (Philippines) Ruben Gonzales / (United States) Nathaniel Lammons (final)
3. (Argentina) Franco Agamenone / (Ukraine) Vladyslav Manafov (quarterfinals)
4. (Poland) Tomasz Bednarek / (Ukraine) Volodymyr Uzhylovskyi (first round)

== Draw ==
=== Key ===
- Q = Qualifier
- WC = Wild card
- LL = Lucky loser
- Alt = Alternate
- SE = Special exempt
- PR = Protected ranking
- ITF = ITF entry
- JE = Junior exempt
- w/o = Walkover
- r = Retired
- d = Defaulted
- SR = Special ranking

First round
1	(Belarus) A Bury (Germany) A Mies	6	1	[8]
(Australia) D Propoggia (Australia) S Puodziunas	2	6	[10]
WC	(Poland) K Majchrzak (Poland) J Zieliński	2	6^{4}
(Poland) M Kowalczyk (Poland) S Walków	6	7^{7}
3	(Argentina) F Agamenone (Ukraine) V Manafov	6	6^{6}	[13]
WC	(Poland) Paweł Ciaś (Poland) Michał Dembek	3	7^{8}	[11]
Alt	(Germany) J Choinski (Germany) J Härteis	3	2
(Poland) G Panfil (France) G Sakharov	6	6
(Argentina) A Collarini (Serbia) M Zekić	6	6
(Czech Republic) Z Kolář (Italy) A Motti	4	4
(Uruguay) M Cuevas (Bolivia) H Dellien	3	6	[10]
4	(Poland) T Bednarek (Ukraine) V Uzhylovskyi	6	3	[7]
(Ukraine) V Orlov (Ukraine) A Smirnov	4	6	[6]
WC	(Poland) K Drzewiecki (Poland) K Żuk	6	3	[10]
(Argentina) P Cachin (Argentina) R Olivo	4	2
2	(Philippines) R Gonzales (United States) N Lammons	6	6

Quarterfinals
(Australia) D Propoggia (Australia) S Puodziunas	2	4
(Poland) M Kowalczyk (Poland) S Walków	6	6
3	(Argentina) F Agamenone (Ukraine) V Manafov	4	4
(Poland) G Panfil (France) G Sakharov	6	6
(Argentina) A Collarini (Serbia) M Zekić	2	4
(Uruguay) M Cuevas (Bolivia) H Dellien	6	6
WC	(Poland) K Drzewiecki (Poland) K Żuk	3	1
2	(Philippines) R Gonzales (United States) N Lammons	6	6

Semifinals
(Poland) M Kowalczyk (Poland) S Walków	7^{7}	7
(Poland) G Panfil (France) G Sakharov	6^{2}	5
(Uruguay) M Cuevas (Bolivia) H Dellien
2	(Philippines) R Gonzales (United States) N Lammons	w/o

Final
(Poland) M Kowalczyk (Poland) S Walków	7^{8}	6
2	(Philippines) R Gonzales (United States) N Lammons	6^{6}	3

== Sources ==
- Main Draw
