= 2011 Torneo Internacional AGT =

- Date: April 25 – May 1
- Edition: 9th
- Location: León, Mexico

Champions

Singles
- (United States) Bobby Reynolds

Doubles
- (United States) Rajeev Ram / (United States) Bobby Reynolds
← 2010 ·	Torneo Internacional AGT	· 2012 →

The 2011 Torneo Internacional AGT was a professional tennis tournament played on hard courts. It was the ninth edition of the tournament which was part of the 2011 ATP Challenger Tour. It took place in León, Mexico between April 25 – May 1, 2011.

== ATP entrants ==
=== Seeds ===
Country	Player	Rank^{1}	Seed
ITA	Paolo Lorenzi	132	1
JPN	Tatsuma Ito	136	2
USA	Bobby Reynolds	147	3
USA	Rajeev Ram	222	4
DOM	Víctor Estrella	227	5
BRA	Fernando Romboli	241	6
FRA	Clément Reix	272	7
USA	Nicholas Monroe	276	8

- Rankings are as of April 18, 2011.

=== Other entrants ===
The following players received wildcards into the singles main draw:

- (Mexico) Juan-Manuel Elizondo
- (Mexico) Fernando Larrea
- (Mexico) César Ramírez
- (Mexico) Manuel Sánchez

The following players received entry from the qualifying draw:

- (United Kingdom) Jamie Baker
- (United Kingdom) Chris Eaton
- (Guatemala) Christopher Díaz Figueroa
- (Austria) Nikolaus Moser

== Champions ==
=== Singles ===
(United States) Bobby Reynolds def. (Germany) Andre Begemann, 6–3, 6–3

=== Doubles ===
(United States) Rajeev Ram / (United States) Bobby Reynolds def. (Germany) Andre Begemann / (United Kingdom) Chris Eaton, 6–3, 6–2
