= 2009 Challenger Varonil Britania Zavaleta =

- Date: 23–29 November
- Edition: 14th
- Location: Puebla, Mexico

Champions

Singles
- (Paraguay) Ramón Valdés

Doubles
- (Canada) Vasek Pospisil / (Canada) Adil Shamasdin
← 2008 ·	Challenger Varonil Britania Zavaleta	· 2016 →

The 2009 Challenger Varonil Britania Zavaleta was a professional tennis tournament played on outdoor hard courts. It was the fourteenth edition of the tournament which was part of the 2009 ATP Challenger Tour. It took place in Puebla, Mexico between 23 and 29 November 2009.

== ATP entrants ==
=== Seeds ===
Country	Player	Rank^{1}	Seed
USA	Taylor Dent	91	1
USA	Jesse Levine	117	2
SLO	Blaž Kavčič	118	3
ESP	Pere Riba	123	4
CHI	Nicolás Massú	128	5
SLO	Grega Žemlja	145	6
MEX	Santiago González	167	7
AUT	Andreas Haider-Maurer	178	8

- Rankings are as of November 16, 2009.

=== Other entrants ===
The following players received wildcards into the singles main draw:

- (Mexico) Tigre Hank
- (United States) Greg Ouellette
- (Mexico) César Ramírez
- (Mexico) Raúl-Isaias Rosas-Zarur

The following players received entry from the qualifying draw:

- (United Kingdom) Richard Bloomfield
- (Mexico) Bruno Rodríguez
- (Mexico) Víctor Romero
- (Australia) Nima Roshan

== Champions ==
=== Singles ===
(Paraguay) Ramón Delgado def. (Germany) Andre Begemann, 6–3, 6–4

=== Doubles ===
(Canada) Vasek Pospisil / (Canada) Adil Shamasdin def. (Spain) Guillermo Olaso / (Spain) Pere Riba, 7–6(7), 6–0
