= 2009 Challenger Varonil Britania Zavaleta – Singles =

Singles
- 2009 Challenger Varonil Britania Zavaleta

Final
- Champion: (Paraguay) Ramón Delgado
- Runner-up: (Germany) Andre Begemann
- Score: 6–3, 6–4

Events
Singles	Doubles
← 2008 ·	Challenger Varonil Britania Zavaleta	· 2010 →

Michael Lammer decided to not defend his last year's title.
Ramón Delgado defeated Andre Begemann 6–3, 6–4 in the final.

== Seeds ==
1. (United States) Taylor Dent (first round)
2. (United States) Jesse Levine (second round)
3. (Slovenia) Blaž Kavčič (quarterfinals)
4. (Spain) Pere Riba (semifinals)
5. (Chile) Nicolás Massú (quarterfinals)
6. (Slovenia) Grega Žemlja (semifinals)
7. (Mexico) Santiago González (first round)
8. (Austria) Andreas Haider-Maurer (first round)

== Draw ==
=== Key ===
- Q = Qualifier
- WC = Wild card
- LL = Lucky loser
- Alt = Alternate
- SE = Special exempt
- PR = Protected ranking
- ITF = ITF entry
- JE = Junior exempt
- w/o = Walkover
- r = Retired
- d = Defaulted
- SR = Special ranking

=== Finals ===
Semifinals
(Paraguay) Ramón Delgado	6	7
6	(Slovenia) Grega Žemlja	3	6^{6}
4	(Spain) Pere Riba	2	5
(Germany) Andre Begemann	6	7

Final
(Paraguay) Ramón Delgado	6	6
(Germany) Andre Begemann	3	4

=== Top half ===
First round
1	(United States) T Dent	6^{5}	3
(Uruguay) M Felder	7	6
Q	(Australia) N Roshan	4	6	3
(Spain) J Checa-Calvo	6	1	6
(Paraguay) R Delgado	6	6
(Austria) R Eitzinger	3	2
Q	(Mexico) V Romero	6	6
8	(Austria) A Haider-Maurer	4	4
3	(Slovenia) B Kavčič	6	6
(Spain) G Olaso	3	3
(Spain) A Menéndez-Maceiras	6	6
(South Africa) R Klaasen	4	3
(United States) R Harrison	3	3
(United Kingdom) J Baker	6	6
WC	(Mexico) T Hank	1	2
6	(Slovenia) G Žemlja	6	6

Second round
(Uruguay) M Felder	1	6	6^{4}
(Spain) J Checa-Calvo	6	1	7
(Paraguay) R Delgado	6	6
Q	(Mexico) V Romero	4	3
3	(Slovenia) B Kavčič	6	6
(Spain) A Menéndez-Maceiras	2	3
(United Kingdom) J Baker	6	4	1
6	(Slovenia) G Žemlja	1	6	6

Quarterfinals
(Spain) J Checa-Calvo	1	0
(Paraguay) R Delgado	6	6
3	(Slovenia) B Kavčič	2	5
6	(Slovenia) G Žemlja	6	7

Semifinals
(Paraguay) R Delgado	6	7
6	(Slovenia) G Žemlja	3	6^{6}

=== Bottom half ===
First round
5	(Chile) N Massú	6	6
Q	(Mexico) B Rodríguez	2	3
(Spain) F Vicente	6	7
(Spain) C Poch-Gradin	2	5
WC	(United States) G Ouellette	4	6^{5}
Q	(United Kingdom) R Bloomfield	6	7
WC	(Mexico) R-I Rosas-Zaur	0	1
4	(Spain) P Riba	6	6
7	(Mexico) S González	6^{2}	6^{4}
(Mexico) M Gallardo-Valles	7	7
ALT	(Canada) V Pospisil	3	3
(Portugal) L Tavares	6	6
(Germany) A Begemann	6	4	7
WC	(Mexico) C Ramírez	2	6	6^{1}
(Brazil) M Demoliner	4	4
2	(United States) J Levine	6	6

Second round
5	(Chile) N Massú	6	3	6
(Spain) F Vicente	2	6	3
Q	(United Kingdom) R Bloomfield	6^{4}	4
4	(Spain) P Riba	7	6
(Mexico) M Gallardo-Valles	7	4	1
(Portugal) L Tavares	6^{6}	6	6
(Germany) A Begemann	6	6
2	(United States) J Levine	4	1

Quarterfinals
5	(Chile) N Massú	5	1
4	(Spain) P Riba	7	6
(Portugal) L Tavares	2	5
(Germany) A Begemann	6	7

Semifinals
4	(Spain) P Riba	2	5
(Germany) A Begemann	6	7
