= 2018 Sopot Open – Singles =

Singles
- 2018 Sopot Open

Final
- Champion: (Italy) Paolo Lorenzi
- Runner-up: (Spain) Daniel Gimeno Traver
- Score: 7–6^{(7–2)}, 6–7^{(5–7)}, 6–3

Events
Singles	Doubles
- Sopot Open

This was the first edition of the tournament.

Paolo Lorenzi won the title after defeating Daniel Gimeno Traver 7–6^{(7–2)}, 6–7^{(5–7)}, 6–3 in the final.

== Seeds ==
1. (Bolivia) Hugo Dellien (second round)
2. (Italy) Paolo Lorenzi (champion)
3. (Argentina) Juan Ignacio Londero (withdrew)
4. (Norway) Casper Ruud (first round)
5. (Germany) Mats Moraing (first round)
6. (Germany) Oscar Otte (quarterfinals)
7. (Russia) Alexey Vatutin (second round)
8. (Spain) Daniel Gimeno Traver (final)

== Draw ==
Key

- Q = Qualifier
- WC = Wild card
- LL = Lucky loser
- Alt = Alternate
- ITF = ITF entry
- PR = Protected ranking
- SR = Special ranking
- SE = Special exempt
- JE = Junior exempt
- JR = Junior Accelerator Programme entrant
- CO = College Accelerator Programme entrant
- NG = Next Gen Accelerator Program entrant
- w/o = Walkover
- r = Retired
- d = Defaulted

=== Finals ===
Semifinals
8	(Spain) Daniel Gimeno Traver	7	6
(Argentina) Pedro Cachin	5	1
(Czech Republic) Zdeněk Kolář	4	0
2	(Italy) Paolo Lorenzi	6	6

Final
8	(Spain) Daniel Gimeno Traver	6^{2}	7^{7}	3
2	(Italy) Paolo Lorenzi	7^{7}	6^{5}	6

=== Top half ===
First round
1	(Bolivia) H Dellien	7	3
Q	(Ukraine) V Manafov	5	0^{r}
(Kazakhstan) A Nedovyesov	5	6	1
(Spain) T Robredo	7	3	6
WC	(Poland) D Michalski	6	6
WC	(Poland) Michał Dembek	2	4
WC	(Poland) W Marek	5	4
8	(Spain) D Gimeno Traver	7	6
4	(Norway) C Ruud	2	6	5
LL	(Ukraine) A Smirnov	6	1	7
(Argentina) P Cachin	7^{7}	6
(Poland) K Majchrzak	6^{2}	1
(Brazil) T Bellucci	4	2
(Italy) G Mager	6	6
(Netherlands) T de Bakker	7^{7}	6
5	(Germany) M Moraing	6^{4}	2

Second round
1	(Bolivia) H Dellien	2	6	3
(Spain) T Robredo	6	3	6
WC	(Poland) D Michalski	1	1
8	(Spain) D Gimeno Traver	6	6
LL	(Ukraine) A Smirnov	5	2
(Argentina) P Cachin	7	6
(Italy) G Mager	4	1
(Netherlands) T de Bakker	6	6

Quarterfinals
(Spain) T Robredo	4	6^{4}
8	(Spain) D Gimeno Traver	6	7^{7}
(Argentina) P Cachin	6	3	6
(Netherlands) T de Bakker	3	6	2

Semifinals
8	(Spain) D Gimeno Traver	7	6
(Argentina) P Cachin	5	1

=== Bottom half ===
First round
7	(Russia) A Vatutin	7^{7}	6
(Uruguay) M Cuevas	6^{4}	3
(Czech Republic) Z Kolář	3	6	6
SE	(France) T Lamasine	6	3	3
(Serbia) M Zekić	3	1
Q	(France) M Janvier	6	6
Q	(Italy) R Marcora	6	6
Q	(Bulgaria) D Kuzmanov	3	3
6	(Germany) O Otte	7	6
(Slovakia) F Horanský	5	0
(Argentina) A Collarini	6^{6}	3
WC	(Poland) Paweł Ciaś	7^{8}	6
(France) G Sakharov	6	4	1
(Germany) J Choinski	0	6	6
(Spain) N Kuhn	3	0
2	(Italy) P Lorenzi	6	6

Second round
7	(Russia) A Vatutin	3	3
(Czech Republic) Z Kolář	6	6
Q	(France) M Janvier	6	6
Q	(Italy) R Marcora	1	3
6	(Germany) O Otte	6	5	7
WC	(Poland) P Ciaś	2	7	5
(Germany) J Choinski	5	0
2	(Italy) P Lorenzi	7	6

Quarterfinals
(Czech Republic) Z Kolář	6	2	7
Q	(France) M Janvier	4	6	5
6	(Germany) O Otte	6	3	2
2	(Italy) P Lorenzi	3	6	6

Semifinals
(Czech Republic) Z Kolář	4	0
2	(Italy) P Lorenzi	6	6

== Sources ==
- Main Draw
- Qualifying Draw
