= 2018 Sopot Open =

- Date: 30 July – 5 August
- Edition: 1st
- Surface: Clay
- Location: Gdynia, Poland

Champions

Singles
- (Italy) Paolo Lorenzi

Doubles
- (Poland) Mateusz Kowalczyk / (Poland) Szymon Walków
Sopot Open	· 2019 →

The 2018 Sopot Open was a professional tennis tournament played on clay courts. It was the 1st edition of the tournament which was part of the 2018 ATP Challenger Tour. It was moved from Sopot, Poland to Gdynia due to a problem with the facilities in Sopot. The tournament was played between 30 July and 5 August 2018.

== Singles main-draw entrants ==
=== Seeds ===
Country	Player	Rank^{1}	Seed
BOL	Hugo Dellien	106	1
ITA	Paolo Lorenzi	110	2
~~ARG~~	~~Juan Ignacio Londero~~	~~136~~	~~3~~
NOR	Casper Ruud	141	4
GER	Mats Moraing	152	5
GER	Oscar Otte	173	6
RUS	Alexey Vatutin	183	7
ESP	Daniel Gimeno Traver	185	8

- ^{1} Rankings are as of 23 July 2018.

=== Other entrants ===
The following players received wildcards into the singles main draw:

- (Poland) Paweł Ciaś
- (Poland) Michał Dembek
- (Poland) Wojciech Marek
- (Poland) Daniel Michalski

The following players received entry from the qualifying draw:

- (France) Maxime Janvier
- (Bulgaria) Dimitar Kuzmanov
- (Ukraine) Vladyslav Manafov
- (Italy) Roberto Marcora

The following player received entry as a lucky loser:

- (Ukraine) Artem Smirnov

== Champions ==
=== Singles ===
- (Italy) Paolo Lorenzi def. (Spain) Daniel Gimeno Traver 7–6^{(7–2)}, 6–7^{(5–7)}, 6–3.

=== Doubles ===
- (Poland) Mateusz Kowalczyk / (Poland) Szymon Walków def. (Philippines) Ruben Gonzales / (United States) Nathaniel Lammons 7–6^{(8–6)}, 6–3.
