= 2019 BNP Paribas Sopot Open =

- Date: 29 July – 4 August
- Edition: 2nd
- Surface: Clay
- Location: Sopot, Poland

Champions

Singles
- (Italy) Stefano Travaglia

Doubles
- (Germany) Andre Begemann / (Romania) Florin Mergea
← 2018 ·	BNP Paribas Sopot Open	· 2020 →

The 2019 BNP Paribas Sopot Open is a professional tennis tournament played on clay courts. It will be the 2nd edition of the tournament which is part of the 2019 ATP Challenger Tour. It will take place in Sopot, Poland between 29 July and 4 August 2019.

== Singles main-draw entrants ==
=== Seeds ===
Country	Player	Rank^{1}	Seed
ITA	Stefano Travaglia	98	1
POL	Kamil Majchrzak	102	2
ITA	Paolo Lorenzi	114	3
SWE	Mikael Ymer	125	4
ITA	Lorenzo Giustino	137	5
BEL	Kimmer Coppejans	139	6
ESP	Pedro Martínez	143	7
ITA	Alessandro Giannessi	152	8
ESP	Tommy Robredo	167	9
SVK	Filip Horanský	175	10
RUS	Alexey Vatutin	201	11
EGY	Mohamed Safwat	232	12
CZE	Zdeněk Kolář	239	13
FRA	Tristan Lamasine	251	14
EST	Jürgen Zopp	269	15
GBR	Jan Choinski	279	16

- ^{1} Rankings are as of 22 July 2019.

=== Other entrants ===
The following players received wildcards into the singles main draw:

- (Poland) Michał Dembek
- (Poland) Daniel Michalski
- (Poland) Michał Przysiężny
- (Spain) Tommy Robredo
- (Poland) Kacper Żuk

The following player received entry into the singles main draw as a special exempt:

- (Sweden) Mikael Ymer

The following player received entry into the singles main draw using a protected ranking:

- (Georgia (country)) Aleksandre Metreveli

The following players received entry into the singles main draw using their ITF World Tennis Ranking:

- (Spain) Javier Barranco Cosano
- (Italy) Riccardo Bonadio
- (Russia) Ivan Nedelko
- (Australia) Christopher O'Connell
- (Russia) Evgenii Tiurnev

The following players received entry from the qualifying draw:

- (Poland) Paweł Ciaś
- (Russia) Alexander Zhurbin

== Champions ==
=== Singles ===
- (Italy) Stefano Travaglia def. (Slovakia) Filip Horanský 6–4, 2–6, 6–2.

=== Doubles ===
- (Germany) Andre Begemann / (Romania) Florin Mergea def. (Poland) Karol Drzewiecki / (Poland) Mateusz Kowalczyk 6–1, 3–6, [10–8].
