= 2016 Abierto de Puebla =

- Date: 7–13 March
- Edition: 15th (men); 5th (women)
- Draw: 32S / 16D
- Prize money: $100,000+H $25,000 (women)
- Surface: Hard
- Location: Puebla, Mexico

Champions

Men's singles
- (Colombia) Eduardo Struvay

Women's singles
- (Russia) Irina Khromacheva

Men's doubles
- (New Zealand) Marcus Daniell / (New Zealand) Artem Sitak

Women's doubles
- (Japan) Akiko Omae / (India) Prarthana Thombare
← 2009 ·	Abierto de Puebla	· 2017 →

The 2016 Abierto de Puebla was a professional tennis tournament played on hard courts. It was the 15th edition of the tournament, but the first since 2009, and was part of the 2016 ATP Challenger Tour and the 2016 ITF Women's Circuit, offering prize money of $100,000+H (ATP) and $25,000 (ITF) on 7–13 March 2016. It took place in Puebla, Mexico.

== Singles main-draw entrants ==
=== Seeds ===
Country	Player	Rank^{1}	Seed
GER	Benjamin Becker	102	1
TUN	Malek Jaziri	107	2
ARG	Horacio Zeballos	113	3
COL	Alejandro Falla	130	4
BRA	André Ghem	153	5
ESP	Adrián Menéndez Maceiras	159	6
GBR	James Ward	169	7
ARG	Guido Andreozzi	180	8

- ^{1} Rankings as of February 29, 2016.

=== Other entrants ===
The following players received wildcards into the singles main draw:

- (Mexico) Lucas Gómez
- (Mexico) Hans Hach Verdugo
- (Mexico) Tigre Hank
- (Mexico) Luis Patiño

The following players received entry as an alternate:

- (Czech Republic) Robin Stanek

The following players received entry from the qualifying draw:

- (Australia) Marinko Matosevic
- (Argentina) Andrés Molteni
- (Italy) Stefano Napolitano
- (Argentina) Agustín Velotti

== ITF singles main-draw entrants ==
=== Seeds ===
Country	Player	Rank^{1}	Seed
NED	Richèl Hogenkamp	142	1
FRA	Amandine Hesse	159	2
FRA	Océane Dodin	163	3
FRA	Mathilde Johansson	173	4
RUS	Irina Khromacheva	183	5
JPN	Mayo Hibi	184	6
BUL	Elitsa Kostova	229	7
MEX	Marcela Zacarías	237	8

- ^{1} Rankings as of 8 February 2016.

=== Other entrants ===
The following players received wildcards into the singles main draw:

- (Mexico) Carolina Betancourt
- (Mexico) Alexia Coutiño Castillo
- (Mexico) Katia Monserrat de la Garza Valdez
- (Mexico) María José Zacarías

The following players received entry from the qualifying draw:

- (United States) Lauren Albanese
- (Slovakia) Michaela Hončová
- (United States) Ingrid Neel
- (Japan) Akiko Omae
- (Hungary) Fanny Stollár
- (France) Harmony Tan
- (United Kingdom) Gabriella Taylor
- (Mexico) Renata Zarazúa

The following player received entry by a lucky loser spot:

- (Czech Republic) Kateřina Kramperová
- (Russia) Evgeniya Levashova

== Champions ==
=== Men's singles ===
- (Colombia) Eduardo Struvay def. (Serbia) Peđa Krstin, 4–6, 6–4, 6–4

=== Women's singles ===
- (Russia) Irina Khromacheva def. (Netherlands) Richèl Hogenkamp, 6–3, 6–2

=== Men's doubles ===
- (New Zealand) Marcus Daniell / (New Zealand) Artem Sitak def. (Mexico) Santiago González / (Croatia) Mate Pavić, 3–6, 6–2, [12–10]

=== Women's doubles ===
- (Japan) Akiko Omae / (India) Prarthana Thombare def. (Russia) Irina Khromacheva / (Russia) Ksenia Lykina, 6–4, 2–6 [10–8]
