= 2009 Abierto Internacional Varonil Club Casablanca =

- Date: April 13 – April 18
- Edition: 8th
- Location: Mexico City, Mexico

Champions

Singles
- (Belgium) Dick Norman

Doubles
- (Thailand) Sanchai Ratiwatana / (Thailand) Sonchat Ratiwatana
← 2008 ·	Abierto Internacional Varonil Club Casablanca	· 2010 →

The 2009 Abierto Internacional Varonil Club Casablanca was a professional tennis tournament played on outdoor red clay courts. It was part of the 2009 ATP Challenger Tour. It took place in Mexico City, Mexico between 13 and 18 April 2009.

== Singles entrants ==
=== Seeds ===
Nationality	Player	Ranking*	Seeding
USA	Kevin Kim	102	1
CAN	Frank Dancevic	111	2
JPN	Go Soeda	116	3
ARG	Horacio Zeballos	132	4
THA	Danai Udomchoke	145	5
COL	Santiago Giraldo	147	6
BRA	Franco Ferreiro	157	7
IND	Prakash Amritraj	189	8

- Rankings are as of April 6, 2009.

=== Other entrants ===
The following players received wildcards into the singles main draw:

- (Slovenia) Borut Puc
- (Mexico) César Ramírez
- (Mexico) Bruno Rodríguez

The following players received entry from the qualifying draw:

- (Germany) Matthias Bachinger
- (Uruguay) Marcel Felder
- (France) Vincent Millot
- (Belgium) Dick Norman
- (Belgium) Niels Desein (as a Lucky loser)

== Champions ==
=== Men's singles ===
(Belgium) Dick Norman def. (Uruguay) Marcel Felder, 6–4, 6–7(6), 7–5

=== Men's doubles ===
(Thailand) Sanchai Ratiwatana / (Thailand) Sonchat Ratiwatana def. (Dominican Republic) Víctor Estrella / (Brazil) João Souza, 6–3, 6–3
