= Chris Eaton (tennis) =

British tennis player

- Country (sports): (United Kingdom) Great Britain
- Residence: East Horsley Surrey, England, UK
- Born: 27 November 1987 (age 37); Guildford, Surrey, England
- Height: 6 ft 2 in (188 cm)
- Turned pro: 2007
- Retired: 2012
- Plays: Right-handed (one-handed backhand)
- Prize money: $169,080

Singles
- Career record: 2–2 (in ATP Tour and Grand Slam main draws, and in Davis Cup)
- Career titles: 0
- Highest ranking: No. 317 (15 June 2009)

Grand Slam singles results
- Wimbledon: 2R (2008)

Doubles
- Career record: 3–5 (ATP Tour and Grand Slam main draws, and in Davis Cup)
- Career titles: 0
- Highest ranking: No. 147 (2 May 2011)

Grand Slam doubles results
- Wimbledon: 3R (2010)

Team competitions
- Davis Cup: Euro/Africa Zone Group I 1R (2009)
- Last updated on: 17 June 2021.

Christopher Philip Eaton (born 27 November 1987) is a British retired tennis player. He reached his career-high singles ranking of World No. 317 in June 2009, and his career-high doubles ranking of World No. 147 in May 2011. Eaton is currently the assistant coach at Wake Forest University.

In February 2009, Eaton played what was then the longest tennis match in history, lasting 6 hours and 40 minutes, eventually beating James Ward 21–19 in the fifth set. This was a playoff match to decide the Davis Cup team, but it was not sanctioned by the ATP, so it was not an official record and was later broken.

== Early and personal life ==
He learned to play tennis at Reed's School. He was nicknamed the "Eaton Rifle" due to his big serve.

From age 8 to 16, he was coached by Justin Sherring.

== Junior career ==
Eaton reached a career high of No. 97 in April 2005 at age 17. In his only singles main draw junior grand slam match, and his final match as a junior, he lost to Donald Young at Wimbledon in 2005, 1–6, 5–7.

== Senior career ==
=== 2007 ===
Eaton's best results in 2007 were two Futures doubles championships in Israel and Great Britain, and a singles semifinal appearance at Israel F4 in November, where he beat No. 839 Amir Hadad. He finished 2007 ranked No. 656 in singles.

=== 2008 ===
Eaton made little singles progress in the first 4 months of the year. However, he had much success in doubles, making the doubles finals of 5 Futures and winning two of them.

In June, he had a breakthrough singles win in the 2nd round of qualifying at Nottingham, beating his first top-100 opponent, No. 90 Guillermo García López, before losing to No. 111 Vince Spadea in the final qualifying round. He followed that up the next week as a wild card by qualifying in singles for the Wimbledon Championships, beating No. 140 Mikhail Kukushkin, No. 206 Jan Minář, and No. 162 Olivier Patience, scoring 32 aces in that match. He was also given a wild card into the main doubles draw with Alexander Slabinsky.

In the Wimbledon Championships first round he beat Serbia's Boris Pasanski 6–3 7–6(8–6) 6–4. He then faced Russia's Dmitry Tursunov, the number 25 seed in the second round on Court One, his first show-court appearance. However, he could not continue his winning streak and Eaton lost 6–7(2), 2–6, 4–6. As a result of his performance at Wimbledon, Eaton's ranking rose to a career high of 386. This made him eligible for Challenger events.

=== 2009 ===
Having played little more than a few Futures at the start of the year, Eaton was thrust into play-offs, between six British tennis hopefuls, designed by John Lloyd to help pick the two singles players to represent Great Britain in the Euro/Africa Zone Group I tie against Ukraine.

Eaton started well, defeating Alexander Slabinsky 6–4 6–4 2–6 7–6 (7–5). He then beat James Ward 6–3 6–2 6–7 (3–7) 2–6 21–19 in a gruelling match lasting six hours and 40 minutes, making it the longest match in history prior to the epic Isner-Mahut match at the 2010 Wimbledon Championships. Lloyd had decided he had seen enough, and chose Eaton and Joshua Goodall as the two players to represent Britain alongside Colin Fleming and Ross Hutchins.

Eaton lost his first Davis Cup match 6–3, 3–6, 6–3, 6–4 to Ukrainian number 1 Sergiy Stakhovsky but managed to restore some pride to Team GB, who were on the verge of a whitewash before Eaton managed to beat Illya Marchenko 6–3, 4–6, 7–6 in the remaining dead rubber. Despite putting in one of the better performances by British players other than Andy Murray in the Davis Cup recently, Eaton didn't appear in the plans of captain John Lloyd for forthcoming fixtures.

=== 2010 ===
At Wimbledon Eaton and doubles partner Dominic Inglot defeated the defending champions Daniel Nestor and Nenad Zimonjić in the second round, to achieve his best Slam result with a third round appearance.

Eaton began playing touchtennis as a pastime against other former professional tennis players as well as current park players and rank amateurs. He has won one title and hosted a weekly tennis phone in show on the sports website.

Eaton played his last match in the 2012 Wimbledon qualifying second round. He joined the Wake Forest men's tennis staff as an assistant coach in the 2016–17 season.

He coaches doubles player Henri Kontinen.

== ATP Challenger and ITF Futures finals ==
=== Singles: 4 (3–1) ===
Legend ATP Challenger (0–0) ITF Futures (3–1)	Finals by surface Hard (2–0) Clay (0–0) Grass (0–0) Carpet (1–1)

Result	W–L	Date	Tournament	Tier	Surface	Opponent	Score
Win	1–0	Jan 2010	Great Britain F1, Glasgow	Futures	Hard	(United Kingdom) Jamie Baker	6–4, 6–4
Loss	1–1	Jan 2011	Germany F3, Kaarst	Futures	Carpet	(Czech Republic) Jan Mertl	5–7, 4–6
Win	2–1	Apr 2011	Switzerland F3, Taverne	Futures	Carpet	(Germany) Peter Torebko	6–3, 6–4
Win	3–1	Jul 2011	Great Britain F11, Chiswick	Futures	Hard	(Australia) Benjamin Mitchell	7–5, 6–1

=== Doubles: 38 (23–15) ===
Legend ATP Challenger (1–1) ITF Futures (22–14)	Finals by surface Hard (23–10) Clay (0–0) Grass (2–3) Carpet (1–2)

Result	W–L	Date	Tournament	Tier	Surface	Partner	Opponents	Score
Loss	0–1	Mar 2006	China F4, Jiangmen	Futures	Hard	(United Kingdom) Andrew Kennaugh	(China) Yu Xinyuan (China) Zeng Shaoxuan	4–6, 5–7
Loss	0–2	Jun 2006	Turkey F2, Istanbul	Futures	Hard	(United Kingdom) Andrew Kennaugh	(Israel) Victor Kolik (Israel) Ishay Hadash	3–6, 5–7
Win	1–2	Mar 2007	Israel F2, Ramat HaSharon	Futures	Hard	(Israel) Amit Inbar	(Czech Republic) Roman Vögeli (Germany) Alexander Satschko	7–5, 6–2
Win	2–2	Aug 2007	Great Britain F14, Wrexham	Futures	Hard	(France) Pierrick Ysern	(United Kingdom) Edward Corrie (United Kingdom) Tom Rushby	6–1, 6–2
Loss	2–3	Jan 2008	Great Britain F2, Sheffield	Futures	Hard	(United Kingdom) Ken Skupski	(Czech Republic) Jiří Krkoška (India) Purav Raja	6–7^{(7–9)}, 6–7^{(4–7)}
Win	3–3	Feb 2008	Croatia F1, Zagreb	Futures	Hard	(Estonia) Mait Künnap	(Canada) Pierre-Ludovic Duclos (Russia) Denis Matsukevich	2–6, 7–5, [10–8]
Win	4–3	Mar 2008	Portugal F5, Lagos	Futures	Hard	(Australia) Carsten Ball	(United Kingdom) Neil Bamford (United Kingdom) Josh Goodall	6–2, 6–4
Loss	4–4	Mar 2008	Portugal F6, Albufeira	Futures	Hard	(Israel) Amir Weintraub	(United Kingdom) Neil Bamford (United Kingdom) Josh Goodall	3–6, 4–6
Loss	4–5	Apr 2008	Russia F1, Moscow	Futures	Carpet	(United Kingdom) Alexander Slabinsky	(Russia) Sergei Demekhine (Russia) Konstantin Kravchuk	1–6, 2–6
Loss	4–6	Sep 2008	France F13, Bagnères-de-Bigorre	Futures	Hard	(France) Pierrick Ysern	(France) Olivier Charroin (Latvia) Andis Juška	5–7, 4–6
Win	5–6	Jan 2009	Great Britain F1, Glasgow	Futures	Hard	(United Kingdom) Jamie Baker	(France) Romain Jouan (France) Pierrick Ysern	7–5, 6–0
Win	6–6	Aug 2009	Great Britain F10, Ilkley	Futures	Grass	(Austria) Martin Fischer	(Australia) Sadik Kadir (India) Purav Raja	7–5, 3–6, [10–6]
Loss	6–7	Aug 2009	Great Britain F11, Ottershaw	Futures	Hard	(United Kingdom) Jamie Baker	(United Kingdom) Dominic Inglot (United Kingdom) Tim Bradshaw	6–4, 6–7^{(2–7)}, [3–10]
Loss	6–8	Aug 2009	India F7, New Delhi	Futures	Hard	(United Kingdom) Sean Thornley	(India) Ashutosh Singh (India) Vishnu Vardhan	3–6, 7–6^{(7–5)}, [8–10]
Win	7–8	Sep 2009	India F9, New Delhi	Futures	Hard	(India) Rohan Gajjar	(India) Ashutosh Singh (India) Vishnu Vardhan	7–6^{(8–6)}, 7–6^{(7–3)}
Win	8–8	Sep 2009	Great Britain F13, Wrexham	Futures	Hard	(United Kingdom) Dominic Inglot	(South Africa) Andrew Anderson (Republic of Ireland) Colin O'Brien	3–6, 6–3, [10–6]
Win	9–8	Sep 2009	Great Britain F14, Nottingham	Futures	Hard	(United Kingdom) Dominic Inglot	(United Kingdom) Josh Goodall (United Kingdom) Matthew Illingworth	6–3, 6–4
Win	10–8	Oct 2009	Great Britain F15, Glasgow	Futures	Hard	(United Kingdom) Dominic Inglot	(United Kingdom) Daniel Cox (Belarus) Uladzimir Ignatik	6–0, 7–6^{(7–5)}
Win	11–8	Jan 2010	Great Britain F1, Glasgow	Futures	Hard	(United Kingdom) Dominic Inglot	(France) Olivier Charroin (France) Alexandre Renard	4–6, 6–3, [10–2]
Loss	11–9	Jan 2010	Great Britain F2, Sheffield	Futures	Hard	(United Kingdom) Dominic Inglot	(France) Olivier Charroin (Latvia) Andis Juška	2–6, 4–6
Win	12–9	Feb 2010	Bosnia & Herzegovina F2, Sarajevo	Futures	Carpet	(United Kingdom) Dominic Inglot	(Republic of Ireland) Colin O'Brien (Republic of Ireland) James McGee	walkover
Loss	12–10	Jul 2010	Great Britain F10, Frinton	Futures	Grass	(United Kingdom) Josh Goodall	(United Kingdom) Tim Bradshaw (United States) James Ludlow	4–6, 7–6^{(9–7)}, [7–10]
Win	13–10	Jan 2011	Great Britain F1, Glasgow	Futures	Hard	(United Kingdom) Alexander Slabinsky	(Finland) Harri Heliövaara (Finland) Juho Paukku	6–7^{(3–7)}, 6–1, [10–2]
Win	14–10	Jan 2011	Great Britain F2, Sheffield	Futures	Hard	(United Kingdom) Josh Goodall	(France) Olivier Charroin (France) Vincent Stouff	6–1, 6–4
Loss	14–11	Jan 2011	Germany F3, Kaarst	Futures	Carpet	(United Kingdom) Alexander Slabinsky	(Germany) Marcel Zimmermann (Germany) Kevin Krawietz	3–6, 5–7
Win	15–11	Mar 2011	Great Britain F3, Tipton	Futures	Hard	(United Kingdom) Josh Goodall	(United Kingdom) Miles Bugby (United Kingdom) Marcus Willis	6–2, 6–2
Win	16–11	Mar 2011	Great Britain F4, Bath	Futures	Hard	(United Kingdom) Josh Goodall	(Switzerland) Michael Lammer (Switzerland) Alexander Sadecky	6–3, 6–2
Loss	16–12	May 2011	Leon, Mexico	Challenger	Hard	(Germany) Andre Begemann	(United States) Rajeev Ram (United States) Bobby Reynolds	3–6, 2–6
Win	17–12	Jul 2011	Great Britain F8, Manchester	Futures	Grass	(United Kingdom) Josh Goodall	(Tunisia) Malek Jaziri (France) Albano Olivetti	6–4, 7–6^{(7–3)}
Loss	17–13	Jul 2011	Great Britain F9, Ilkley	Futures	Grass	(United Kingdom) Josh Goodall	(United Kingdom) Sean Thornley (United Kingdom) David Rice	7–6^{(7–2)}, 3–6, [7–10]
Loss	17–14	Jul 2011	Great Britain F10, Frinton	Futures	Grass	(United Kingdom) Josh Goodall	(France) Julien Maes (France) Fabrice Martin	5–7, 6–7^{(2–7)}
Win	18–14	Sep 2011	USA F24, Costa Mesa	Futures	Hard	(United Kingdom) Neal Skupski	(United Kingdom) Daniel Cox (Australia) Adam Hubble	6–3, 6–3
Win	19–14	Oct 2011	USA F26, Austin	Futures	Hard	(United Kingdom) Edward Corrie	(United States) Benjamin Rogers (Australia) John-Patrick Smith	7–6^{(8–6)}, 6–2
Win	20–14	Jan 2012	Great Britain F1, Glasgow	Futures	Hard	(United Kingdom) Dominic Inglot	(United Kingdom) Sean Thornley (United Kingdom) David Rice	7–5, 6–2
Win	21–14	Jan 2012	Great Britain F2, Sheffield	Futures	Hard	(United Kingdom) Dominic Inglot	(United Kingdom) Sean Thornley (United Kingdom) David Rice	6–3, 7–5
Loss	21–15	Jan 2012	Great Britain F3, Birkenhead	Futures	Hard	(United Kingdom) Lewis Burton	(United Kingdom) Sean Thornley (United Kingdom) David Rice	2–6, 3–6
Win	22–15	Feb 2012	Dallas, United States	Challenger	Hard	(United Kingdom) Dominic Inglot	(United States) Nicholas Monroe (United States) Jack Sock	6–7^{(6–8)}, 6–4, [19–17]
Win	23–15	Mar 2012	Great Britain F4, Tipton	Futures	Hard	(United Kingdom) Dominic Inglot	(United Kingdom) Sean Thornley (United Kingdom) David Rice	6–3, 6–4
