= BNP Paribas Sopot Open =

Defunct tennis tournament
- Event name: BNP Paribas Sopot Open
- Location: Sopot, Poland (2019); Gdynia, Poland (2018)
- Venue: Sopot Tenis Klub
- Category: ATP Challenger Tour
- Surface: Clay
- Draw: 32S/32Q/16D

The BNP Paribas Sopot Open was a professional tennis tournament played on clay courts. It was part of the Association of Tennis Professionals (ATP) Challenger Tour. Although due to be held annually in Sopot, Poland, it was played in nearby Gdynia in 2018 but moved to Sopot Tenis Klub in 2019. It was regarded as the continuation of the Polish Open, held in Sopot in 2011 and also sponsored by BNP Paribas.

== Past finals ==
=== Singles ===
Year	Champion	Runner-up	Score
2019	(Italy) Stefano Travaglia	(Slovakia) Filip Horanský	6–4, 2–6, 6–2
2018	(Italy) Paolo Lorenzi	(Spain) Daniel Gimeno Traver	7–6^{(7–2)}, 6–7^{(5–7)}, 6–3

=== Doubles ===
Year	Champions	Runners-up	Score
2019	(Germany) Andre Begemann (Romania) Florin Mergea	(Poland) Karol Drzewiecki (Poland) Mateusz Kowalczyk	6–1, 3–6, [10–8]
2018	(Poland) Mateusz Kowalczyk (Poland) Szymon Walków	(Philippines) Ruben Gonzales (United States) Nathaniel Lammons	7–6^{(8–6)}, 6–3
