= 2010 Abierto Internacional del Bicentenario Leon =

- Date: April 12 – April 18
- Edition: 8
- Location: León, Guanajuato, Mexico

Champions

Singles
- (Mexico) Santiago González

Doubles
- (Mexico) Santiago González / (Canada) Vasek Pospisil
- Abierto Internacional del Bicentenario Leon

The 2010 Abierto Internacional del Bicentenario Leon was a professional tennis tournament played on hard courts. It was part of the 2010 ATP Challenger Tour. It took place in León, Guanajuato, Mexico between 12 and 18 April 2010.

== ATP entrants ==
=== Seeds ===
Nationality	Player	Ranking*	Seeding
POL	Michał Przysiężny	105	1
AUS	Greg Jones	196	2
GER	Andre Begemann	198	3
IND	Prakash Amritraj	200	4
USA	Lester Cook	215	5
MEX	Santiago González	217	6
IRL	Conor Niland	228	7
KOR	Im Kyu-tae	238	8

- Rankings are as of April 5, 2010.

=== Other entrants ===
The following players received wildcards into the singles main draw:

- (Mexico) Juan-Manuel Elizondo
- (Mexico) Daniel Garza
- (Mexico) Alfredo Moreno
- (Mexico) César Ramírez

The following players received entry from the qualifying draw:

- (Australia) Kaden Hensel
- (United States) Travis Rettenmaier
- (Switzerland) Roman Valent

== Champions ==
=== Singles ===
(Mexico) Santiago González def. (Poland) Michał Przysiężny, 3–6, 6–1, 7–5

=== Doubles ===
(Mexico) Santiago González / (Canada) Vasek Pospisil def. (Australia) Kaden Hensel / (Australia) Adam Hubble, 3–6, 6–3, [10–8]
