= Abierto de Puebla =

- 2016 Abierto de Puebla

Defunct tennis tournament
- Location: Puebla, Mexico
- Venue: Centro Expositor Puebla
- Surface: Hard
ATP Tour
- Category: ATP Challenger Tour
- Draw: 32S / 32Q / 16D
- Prize money: $100,000+H
WTA Tour
- Category: ITF Women's Circuit
- Draw: 32S / 32Q / 16D
- Prize money: $25,000

The Abierto de Puebla (previously known as the Challenger Varonil Britania Zavaleta) was a professional tennis tournament played on hardcourts. It was part of the ATP Challenger Tour and the International Tennis Federation (ITF) Women's Circuit. It was held annually in Puebla, Mexico, from 1996 to 2009. The tournament was reinstated in 2016 for a year.

== Past finals ==
=== Singles ===
Year	Champion	Runner-up	Score
2016	(Colombia) Eduardo Struvay	(Serbia) Peđa Krstin	4–6, 6–4, 6–4
2010–2015	Not Held		
2009	(Paraguay) Ramón Delgado	(Germany) Andre Begemann	6–3, 6–4
2008	(Switzerland) Michael Lammer	(Austria) Rainer Eitzinger	6–2, 3–6, 6–4
2007	(Argentina) Leonardo Mayer	(Poland) Dawid Olejniczak	6–1, 6–4
2006	(United States) Robert Kendrick	(Argentina) Leonardo Mayer	7–5, 6–4
2005	(United States) Hugo Armando	(Mexico) Bruno Echagaray	2–6, 6–3, 7–6
2004	(Mexico) Miguel Gallardo Valles	(Romania) Răzvan Sabău	7–6, 6–4
2003	(Brazil) Ricardo Mello	(Germany) Markus Hantschk	7–6, 6–4
2002	(United States) Alex Bogomolov Jr.	(South Africa) Rik de Voest	7–6, 6–3
2001	(Mexico) Miguel Gallardo Valles	(Austria) Zbynek Mlynarik	6–2, 6–3
2000	(United States) Brandon Hawk	(France) Antony Dupuis	7–6, 6–3
1999	(United States) Michael Sell	(Mexico) Alejandro Hernández	7–6, 7–5
1998	(Belarus) Vladimir Voltchkov	(Belgium) Christophe Rochus	6–3, 6–3
1997	(Mexico) Luis Herrera	(United States) Wade McGuire	7–6, 4–6, 6–4
1996	(Mexico) Alejandro Hernández	(United States) Alex Reichel	7–6, 7–6

=== Doubles ===
Year	Champions	Runners-up	Score
2016	(New Zealand) Marcus Daniell (New Zealand) Artem Sitak	(Mexico) Santiago González (Croatia) Mate Pavić	3–6, 6–2, [12–10]
2010–2015	Not Held		
2009	(Canada) Vasek Pospisil (Canada) Adil Shamasdin	(Spain) Guillermo Olaso (Spain) Pere Riba	7–6(7), 6–0
2008	(United States) Nicholas Monroe (United States) Eric Nunez	(Mexico) Daniel Garza (Mexico) Santiago González	4–6, 6–3, [10–6]
2007	(Australia) Raphael Durek (Poland) Dawid Olejniczak	(Mexico) Bruno Echagaray (Mexico) Santiago González	6–2, 7–6(6)
2006	(Mexico) Daniel Garza (Netherlands Antilles) Jean-Julien Rojer	(Mexico) Bruno Echagaray (Romania) Horia Tecău	6–7(6), 6–3, [10–7]
2005	(Austria) Werner Eschauer (Germany) Alexander Satschko	(Mexico) Santiago González (Mexico) Alejandro Hernández	6–1, 6–4
2004	(Mexico) Santiago González (Mexico) Alejandro Hernández	(Mexico) Miguel Gallardo Valles (Argentina) Gustavo Marcaccio	6–3, 6–4
2003	(Mexico) Santiago González (Mexico) Alejandro Hernández	(United States) Huntley Montgomery (United States) Andres Pedroso	6–4, 2–6, 6–4
2002	(Mexico) Miguel Gallardo Valles (Mexico) Alejandro Hernández	(United States) Diego Ayala (United States) Robert Kendrick	6–1, 5–7, 7–6(3)
2001	(Israel) Jonathan Erlich (Israel) Andy Ram	(Switzerland) Marco Chiudinelli (Finland) Tuomas Ketola	6–4, 6–7(5), 6–1
2000	(United States) Zack Fleishman (United States) Jeff Williams	(Switzerland) Ivo Heuberger (Finland) Ville Liukko	6–3, 6–4

=== Women's singles ===
Year	Champion	Runner-up	Score
2016	(Russia) Irina Khromacheva	(Netherlands) Richèl Hogenkamp	6–3, 6–2
2015–13	Not Held		
2012	(Argentina) Vanesa Furlanetto	(United States) Elizabeth Ferris	6–3, 6–3
2011–10	Not Held		
2009	(United Kingdom) Naomi Broady	(Croatia) Ajla Tomljanović	7–6^{(7–4)}, 6–3
2008	(Bolivia) María Fernanda Álvarez Terán	(United States) Megan Moulton-Levy	6–4, 3–6, 6–4
2007	Not Held		
2006	(Austria) Yvonne Meusburger	(Croatia) Maria Abramović	6–4, 6–2

=== Women's doubles ===
Year	Champion	Runner-up	Score
2016	(Japan) Akiko Omae (India) Prarthana Thombare	(Russia) Irina Khromacheva (Russia) Ksenia Lykina	6–4, 2–6 [10–8]
2015–13	Not Held		
2012	(Mexico) Ana Paula de la Peña (Mexico) Ivette López	(Brazil) Flávia Guimarães Bueno (Chile) Cecilia Costa Melgar	6–1, 7–6^{(7–0)}
2011–10	Not Held		
2009	(United States) Amanda Fink (United States) Elizabeth Lumpkin	(Brazil) Maria Fernanda Alves (Argentina) Florencia Molinero	6–4, 6–7^{(6–8)} [10–8]
2008	(United States) Audra Cohen (United States) Megan Moulton-Levy	(Bolivia) María Fernanda Álvarez Terán (Argentina) Veronica Spiegel	6–2, 6–4
2007	Not Held		
2006	(Brazil) Maria Fernanda Alves (Czech Republic) Hana Šromová	(Croatia) Ivana Abramović (Croatia) Maria Abramović	6–4, 6–3
