= Im Kyu-tae =

South Korean tennis player

- Country (sports): South Korea
- Residence: Seoul, South Korea
- Born: January 6, 1981 (age 45) Seoul, South Korea
- Height: 1.85 m (6 ft 1 in)
- Turned pro: 2001
- Retired: 2013
- Plays: Right-handed
- Prize money: US $186,974

Singles
- Career record: 5–8
- Career titles: 0
- Highest ranking: No. 160 (9 November 2009)

Grand Slam singles results
- Australian Open: Q2 (2009)

Doubles
- Career record: 1-2
- Career titles: 0
- Highest ranking: No. 278 (28 January 2008)

- Korean name
- Hangul: 임규태
- RR: Im Gyutae
- MR: Im Kyut'ae

Im Kyu-tae (born January 6, 1981, in Seoul, South Korea) is a retired professional tennis player.

In 2008, Im served a three-month ban for unintentional use of ephedrine which was in a Chinese medicine.
