= Andre Begemann =

German professional tennis player

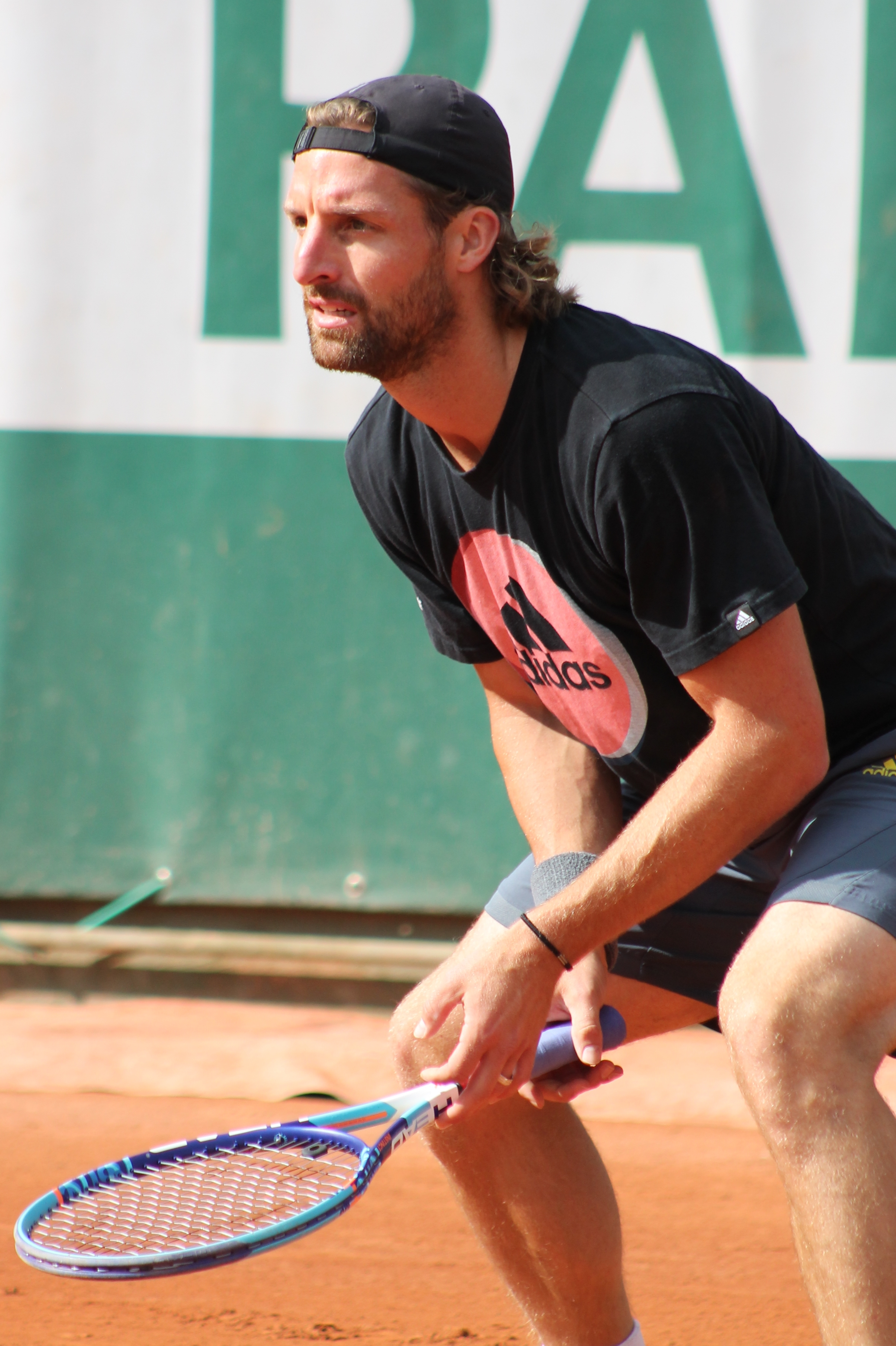
- Begemann at the 2015 French Open
- Country (sports): Germany
- Born: 12 July 1984 (age 41) Lemgo, Germany
- Height: 1.88 m (6 ft 2 in)
- Turned pro: 2008
- Retired: 2024 (last match played)
- Plays: Right-handed
- Prize money: US$936,619

Singles
- Career record: 0–0
- Career titles: 0
- Highest ranking: No. 166 (5 July 2010)

Grand Slam singles results
- Australian Open: Q1 (2010, 2012)
- French Open: Q1 (2010)
- Wimbledon: Q3 (2010)
- US Open: Q2 (2011)

Doubles
- Career record: 106–127
- Career titles: 4
- Highest ranking: No. 36 (11 May 2015)

Grand Slam doubles results
- Australian Open: 1R (2013, 2014, 2015, 2017, 2021)
- French Open: 3R (2014)
- Wimbledon: 2R (2013, 2014, 2015)
- US Open: 2R (2013)

Grand Slam mixed doubles results
- Wimbledon: QF (2017)

Andre Begemann (born 12 July 1984) is a German former professional tennis player. He is a doubles specialist who reached his career-high ATP doubles ranking of world No. 36, achieved in May 2015. He has a career-high singles ranking of No. 166, achieved in July 2010. Begemann has won four ATP Tour doubles titles.

== Performance timeline ==
Key
W	F	SF	QF	#R	RR	Q#	DNQ	A	NH

(W) winner; (F) finalist; (SF) semifinalist; (QF) quarterfinalist; (#R) rounds 4, 3, 2, 1; (RR) round-robin stage; (Q#) qualification round; (DNQ) did not qualify; (A) absent; (NH) not held; (SR) strike rate (events won / competed); (W–L) win–loss record.
To avoid confusion and double counting, these charts are updated at the conclusion of a tournament or when the player's participation has ended.

Tournament	2012	2013	2014	2015	2016	2017	2018	2019	2020	2021	2022	2023	2024	SR	W–L
Grand Slam tournaments
Australian Open	A	1R	1R	1R	A	1R	A	A	A	1R	A	A	A	0 / 5	0–5
French Open	A	2R	3R	2R	A	2R	1R	A	A	1R	A	A	A	0 / 6	5–6
Wimbledon	1R	2R	2R	2R	A	1R	1R	A	NH	1R	A	A	A	0 / 7	3–7
US Open	A	2R	1R	1R	1R	1R	A	A	A	A	A	A	A	0 / 5	1–5
Win–loss	0–1	3–4	3–4	2–4	0–1	1–4	0–2	0–0	0–0	0–3	0–0	0–0	0–0	0 / 23	9–23
National representation
Davis Cup	A	A	QF	1R	A	A	A	A	A	A	A	A	A	0 / 2	0–2
ATP Masters 1000
Indian Wells Open	A	A	A	2R	A	A	A	A	NH	A	A	A	A	0 / 1	1–1
Miami Open	A	A	1R	2R	A	A	A	A	NH	A	A	A	A	0 / 2	1–2
Canadian Open	A	1R	A	A	A	A	A	A	NH	A	A	A	A	0 / 1	0–1
Shanghai Masters	A	1R	A	A	A	A	A	A	NH			A	A	0 / 1	0–1
Win–loss	0–0	0–2	0–1	2–2	0–0	0–0	0–0	0–0	0–0	0–0	0–0	0–0	0–0	0 / 5	2–5
Career statistics
Tournaments	3	23	21	25	8	17	11	4	2	12	0	1	2	129	
Titles	1	1	2	0	0	0	0	0	0	0	0	0	0	4	
Finals	1	3	3	0	2	0	1	0	0	1	0	0	0	11	
Overall win–loss	4–2	22–22	28–20	17–26	7–8	8–17	7–11	2–4	2–2	5–12	0–0	0–1	4–2	106–127	
Win %	67%	50%	58%	40%	47%	32%	41%	33%	50%	29%	–	0%	67%	45%	
Year-end ranking (Note: Year-end ranking 2008: 612, 2009: 313, 2010: 148, 2011: 160)	80	49	41	61	106	83	114	109	92	123	–	198	114		

== ATP Tour finals ==
=== Doubles: 11 (4 titles, 7 runner-ups) ===
Legend Grand Slam Tournaments (0–0) ATP Finals (0–0) ATP Tour Masters 1000 (0–0) ATP Tour 500 Series (0–0) ATP Tour 250 Series (4–7)	Finals by surface Hard (1–4) Clay (2–2) Grass (1–1)

Result	W–L	Date	Tournament	Tier	Surface	Partner	Opponents	Score
Win	1–0	Oct 2012	Vienna Open, Austria	250 Series	Hard (i)	(Germany) Martin Emmrich	(Austria) Julian Knowle (Slovakia) Filip Polášek	6−4, 3−6, [10−4]
Loss	1–1	Jan 2013	Chennai Open, India	250 Series	Hard	(Germany) Martin Emmrich	(France) Benoît Paire (Switzerland) Stanislas Wawrinka	2−6, 1−6
Win	2–1	May 2013	Düsseldorf Open, Germany	250 Series	Clay	(Germany) Martin Emmrich	(Philippines) Treat Conrad Huey (United Kingdom) Dominic Inglot	7–5, 6–2
Loss	2–2	Jun 2013	Rosmalen Championships, Netherlands	250 Series	Grass	(Germany) Martin Emmrich	(Belarus) Max Mirnyi (Romania) Horia Tecău	3–6, 6–7^{(4–7)}
Win	3–2	Jun 2014	Halle Open, Germany	250 Series	Grass	(Austria) Julian Knowle	(Switzerland) Marco Chiudinelli (Switzerland) Roger Federer	1–6, 7–5, [12–10]
Win	4–2	Jul 2014	Swiss Open Gstaad, Switzerland	250 Series	Clay	(Netherlands) Robin Haase	(Australia) Rameez Junaid (Slovakia) Michal Mertiňák	6–3, 6–4
Loss	4–3	Oct 2014	Vienna Open, Austria	250 Series	Hard (i)	(Austria) Julian Knowle	(Austria) Jürgen Melzer (Germany) Philipp Petzschner	6–7^{(6–8)}, 6–4, [7–10]
Loss	4–4	Aug 2016	Winston-Salem Open, United States	250 Series	Hard	(India) Leander Paes	(Spain) Guillermo García López (Finland) Henri Kontinen	6–4, 6–7^{(6–8)}, [8–10]
Loss	4–5	Sep 2016	St. Petersburg Open, Russia	250 Series	Hard (i)	(India) Leander Paes	(United Kingdom) Dominic Inglot (Finland) Henri Kontinen	6–4, 3–6, [10–12]
Loss	4–6	Apr 2018	US Clay Court Championships, United States	250 Series	Clay	(Croatia) Antonio Šančić	(Belarus) Max Mirnyi (Austria) Philipp Oswald	7–6^{(7–2)}, 4–6, [9–11]
Loss	4–7	Jul 2021	Swedish Open, Sweden	250 Series	Clay	(France) Albano Olivetti	(Netherlands) Sander Arends (Netherlands) David Pel	4–6, 2–6

== ATP Challenger finals ==
=== Singles: 2 (0–2) ===
Finals by surface
Hard (0–2)
Clay (0–0)

Result	W–L	Date	Tournament	Surface	Opponent	Score
Loss	0–1	Nov 2009	Puebla, Mexico	Hard	(Paraguay) Ramón Delgado	3–6, 4–6
Loss	0–2	May 2011	León, Mexico	Hard	(United States) Bobby Reynolds	3–6, 3–6

=== Doubles: 51 (34–17) ===
Finals by surface
Hard (12–8)
Clay (18–8)
Carpet (4–1)

Result	W–L	Date	Tournament	Surface	Partner	Opponents	Score
Win	1–0	Nov 2009	Cancún, Mexico	Clay	(Portugal) Leonardo Tavares	(United States) Gregory Ouellette (Canada) Adil Shamasdin	6–1, 6–7^{(6–8)}, [10–8]
Loss	1–1	May 2010	Cairo, Egypt	Clay	(Jamaica) Dustin Brown	(Austria) Martin Slanar (Italy) Simone Vagnozzi	3–6, 4–6
Win	2–1	May 2010	Zagreb, Croatia	Clay	(Australia) Matthew Ebden	(Spain) Rubén Ramírez Hidalgo (Spain) Santiago Ventura	7–6^{(7–5)}, 5–7, [10–3]
Win	3–1	Sep 2010	Genova, Italy	Clay	(Germany) Martin Emmrich	(United States) Brian Battistone (Sweden) Andreas Siljeström	1–6, 7–6^{(7–3)}, [10–7]
Win	4–1	Oct 2010	Cali, Colombia	Clay	(Germany) Martin Emmrich	(Germany) Gero Kretschmer (Germany) Alexander Satschko	6–4, 7–6^{(7–5)}
Loss	4–2	Mar 2011	Kyoto, Japan	Carpet (i)	(Australia) James Lemke	(Germany) Dominik Meffert (Germany) Simon Stadler	5–7, 6–2, [7–10]
Loss	4–3	Apr 2011	Johannesburg, South Africa	Hard	(Australia) Matthew Ebden	(Germany) Michael Kohlmann (Austria) Alexander Peya	2–6, 2–6
Loss	4–4	May 2011	León, Mexico	Hard	(United Kingdom) Chris Eaton	(United States) Rajeev Ram (United States) Bobby Reynolds	3–6, 2–6
Win	5–4	Sep 2011	Istanbul, Turkey	Hard	(Australia) Carsten Ball	(France) Grégoire Burquier (Belgium) Yannick Mertens	6–2, 6–4
Loss	5–5	Oct 2011	Quito, Ecuador	Clay	(South Africa) Izak van der Merwe	(Colombia) Juan Sebastián Gómez (United States) Maciek Sykut	6–3, 5–7, [8–10]
Win	6–5	Nov 2011	Eckental, Germany	Carpet (i)	(Russia) Alexander Kudryavtsev	(United States) James Cerretani (Canada) Adil Shamasdin	6–3, 3–6, [11–9]
Loss	6–6	Apr 2012	San Luis Potosí, Mexico	Clay	(Australia) Jordan Kerr	(United States) Nicholas Monroe (Germany) Simon Stadler	6–3, 5–7, [7–10]
Win	7–6	May 2012	Athens, Greece	Hard	(Australia) Jordan Kerr	(Spain) Gerard Granollers Pujol (Greece) Alexandros Jakupovic	6–2, 6–3
Win	8–6	Sep 2012	Genova, Italy (2)	Clay	(Germany) Martin Emmrich	(Germany) Dominik Meffert (Austria) Philipp Oswald	6–3, 6–1
Win	9–6	Sep 2012	Szczecin, Poland	Clay	(Germany) Martin Emmrich	(Poland) Tomasz Bednarek (Poland) Mateusz Kowalczyk	3–6, 6–1, [10–3]
Win	10–6	Oct 2012	Tashkent, Uzbekistan	Hard	(Germany) Martin Emmrich	(Australia) Rameez Junaid (Germany) Frank Moser	6–7^{(2–7)}, 7–6^{(7–2)}, [10–8]
Win	11–6	May 2013	Rome, Italy	Clay	(Germany) Martin Emmrich	(Germany) Philipp Marx (Romania) Florin Mergea	7–6^{(7–4)}, 6–3
Loss	11–7	Mar 2014	Guadalajara, Mexico	Hard	(Australia) Matthew Ebden	(Mexico) César Ramírez (Mexico) Miguel Ángel Reyes-Varela	4–6, 2–6
Win	12–7	May 2014	Heilbronn, Germany	Clay	(Germany) Tim Pütz	(Netherlands) Jesse Huta Galung (Australia) Rameez Junaid	6–3, 6–3
Win	13–7	Jun 2014	Prostějov, Czech Republic	Clay	(Czech Republic) Lukáš Rosol	(Canada) Peter Polansky (Canada) Adil Shamasdin	6–1, 6–2
Loss	13–8	Oct 2014	Mons, Belgium	Hard (i)	(Austria) Julian Knowle	(France) Marc Gicquel (France) Nicolas Mahut	3–6, 4–6
Loss	13–9	Oct 2015	Tashkent, Uzbekistan	Hard	(New Zealand) Artem Sitak	(Belarus) Sergey Betov (Russia) Mikhail Elgin	4–6, 4–6
Loss	13–10	Nov 2015	Hua Hin, Thailand	Hard	(India) Purav Raja	(Chinese Taipei) Lu Yen-hsun (Chinese Taipei) Lee Hsin-han	w/o
Win	14–10	Jul 2016	Biella, Italy	Clay	(India) Leander Paes	(Slovakia) Andrej Martin (Chile) Hans Podlipnik Castillo	6–4, 6–4
Win	15–10	Aug 2016	Cordenons, Italy	Clay	(Belarus) Aliaksandr Bury	(Czech Republic) Roman Jebavý (Czech Republic) Zdeněk Kolář	5–7, 6–4, [11–9]
Win	16–10	Sep 2016	Szczecin, Poland (2)	Clay	(Belarus) Aliaksandr Bury	(Sweden) Johan Brunström (Sweden) Andreas Siljeström	7–6^{(7–3)}, 6–7^{(7–9)}, [10–4]
Loss	16–11	Oct 2016	Tashkent, Uzbekistan	Hard	(India) Leander Paes	(Russia) Mikhail Elgin (Uzbekistan) Denis Istomin	4–6, 2–6
Win	17–11	Jan 2017	Canberra, Australia	Hard	(Germany) Jan-Lennard Struff	(Argentina) Carlos Berlocq (Argentina) Andrés Molteni	6–3, 6–4
Loss	17–12	Mar 2017	Quanzhou, China	Hard	(Belarus) Aliaksandr Bury	(Chinese Taipei) Hsieh Cheng-peng (Chinese Taipei) Peng Hsien-yin	6–3, 4–6, [7–10]
Win	18–12	Apr 2017	Saint Brieuc, France	Hard (i)	(Denmark) Frederik Nielsen	(Republic of Ireland) David O'Hare (United Kingdom) Joe Salisbury	6–3, 6–4
Loss	18–13	May 2017	Aix-en-Provence, France	Clay	(France) Jérémy Chardy	(Netherlands) Wesley Koolhof (Netherlands) Matwé Middelkoop	6–2, 4–6, [14–16]
Win	19–13	Sep 2017	Istanbul, Turkey (2)	Hard	(France) Jonathan Eysseric	(Monaco) Romain Arneodo (France) Hugo Nys	6–3, 5–7, [10–4]
Win	20–13	Nov 2017	Mouilleron-le-Captif, France	Hard (i)	(France) Jonathan Eysseric	(Poland) Tomasz Bednarek (Netherlands) David Pel	6–3, 6–4
Win	21–13	Sep 2018	Como, Italy	Clay	(Germany) Dustin Brown	(Slovakia) Martin Kližan (Slovakia) Filip Polášek	3–6, 6–4, [10–5]
Loss	21–14	May 2019	Heilbronn, Germany	Clay	(France) Fabrice Martin	(Germany) Andreas Mies (Germany) Kevin Krawietz	2–6, 4–6
Win	22–14	Aug 2019	Sopot, Poland	Clay	(Romania) Florin Mergea	(Poland) Karol Drzewiecki (Poland) Mateusz Kowalczyk	6–1, 3–6, [10–8]
Win	23–14	Aug 2019	Meerbusch, Germany	Clay	(Romania) Florin Mergea	(India) Sriram Balaji (India) Vishnu Vardhan	7–6^{(7–1)}, 6–7^{(4–7)}, [10–3]
Win	24–14	Sep 2019	Como, Italy (2)	Clay	(Romania) Florin Mergea	(Brazil) Fabrício Neis (Portugal) Pedro Sousa	5–7, 7–5, [14–12]
Win	25–14	Nov 2019	Maia, Portugal	Clay (i)	(Germany) Daniel Masur	(Spain) Guillermo García López (Spain) David Vega Hernández	7–6^{(7–2)}, 6–4
Win	26–14	Oct 2020	Ismaning, Germany	Carpet (i)	(Netherlands) David Pel	(United Kingdom) Lloyd Glasspool (United States) Alex Lawson	5–7, 7–6^{(7–2)}, [10–4]
Win	27–14	Nov 2020	Ortisei, Italy	Hard (i)	(France) Albano Olivetti	(Croatia) Ivan Sabanov (Croatia) Matej Sabanov	6–3, 6–2
Win	28–14	Mar 2021	Lugano, Switzerland	Hard (i)	(Italy) Andrea Vavassori	(Ukraine) Denys Molchanov (Ukraine) Sergiy Stakhovsky	7–6^{(13–11)}, 4–6, [10–8]
Win	29–14	Oct 2021	Ismaning, Germany (2)	Carpet (i)	(Slovakia) Igor Zelenay	(Czech Republic) Marek Gengel (Czech Republic) Tomáš Macháč	6–2, 6–4
Win	30–14	Oct 2023	Bratislava, Slovakia	Hard (i)	(India) Sriram Balaji	(Kazakhstan) Andrey Golubev (Ukraine) Denys Molchanov	6–3, 5–7, [10–8]
Win	31–14	Nov 2023	Ismaning, Germany (3)	Carpet (i)	(India) Sriram Balaji	(Germany) Hendrik Jebens (Germany) Constantin Frantzen	7–6^{(7–4)}, 6–4
Win	32–14	Nov 2023	Helsinki, Finland	Hard (i)	(India) Sriram Balaji	(India) Jeevan Nedunchezhiyan (India) Vijay Sundar Prashanth	6–2, 7–5
Win	33–14	May 2024	Cagliari, Italy	Clay	(India) Sriram Balaji	(Bolivia) Boris Arias (Bolivia) Federico Zeballos	6–4, 6–7^{(3–7)}, [10–6]
Loss	33–15	Jun 2024	Vicenza, Italy	Clay	(India) Niki Kaliyanda Poonacha	(Ukraine) Vladyslav Manafov (Finland) Patrik Niklas-Salminen	3–6, 4–6
Loss	33–16	Jun 2024	Perugia, Italy	Clay	(India) Sriram Balaji	(Argentina) Guido Andreozzi (Mexico) Miguel Ángel Reyes-Varela	4–6, 5–7
Win	34–16	Jun 2024	Milan, Italy	Clay	(France) Jonathan Eysseric	(Czech Republic) Petr Nouza (Czech Republic) Patrik Rikl	2–6, 6–4, [10–6]
Loss	34–17	Jul 2024	Modena, Italy	Clay	(Finland) Patrik Niklas-Salminen	(France) Jonathan Eysseric (United States) George Goldhoff	3–6, 6–3, [8–10]

== ITF Futures finals ==
=== Singles: 9 (9–0) ===
Finals by surface
Hard (0–0)
Clay (9–0)

Result	W–L	Date	Tournament	Surface	Opponent	Score
Win	1–0	Jul 2008	Germany F10, Römerberg	Clay	(Germany) Holger Fischer	6–1, 6–2
Win	2–0	Aug 2008	Egypt F4, Giza	Clay	(Morocco) Anas Fattar	6–4, 6–3
Win	3–0	Sep 2008	Burundi F1, Bujumbura	Clay	(Lithuania) Gvidas Sabeckis	7–6^{(7–2)}, 6–4
Win	4–0	Sep 2008	Rwanda F1, Kigali	Clay	(Lithuania) Gvidas Sabeckis	6–3, 6–0
Win	5–0	Sep 2008	Uganda F1, Kampala	Clay	(Lithuania) Gvidas Sabeckis	6–3, 6–7^{(2–7)}, 6–3
Win	6–0	Dec 2009	Peru F2, Arequipa	Clay	(Ecuador) Iván Endara	6–7^{(4–7)}, 6–2, 6–2
Win	7–0	Jan 2011	Brazil F2, Salvador	Clay	(Brazil) Eládio Ribeiro Neto	1–6, 6–4, 6–4
Win	8–0	Jan 2011	Brazil F3, Aracaju	Clay (i)	(Sweden) Christian Lindell	6–4, 6–2
Win	9–0	Feb 2011	Brazil F6, Natal	Clay	(Brazil) Tiago Lopes	6–3, 6–3

=== Doubles: 15 (9–6) ===
Finals by surface
Hard (2–2)
Clay (7–4)

Result	W–L	Date	Tournament	Surface	Partner	Opponents	Score
Win	1–0	Jul 2005	Germany F9, Leun	Clay	(Germany) Bastian Knittel	(Germany) Ralph Grambow (Germany) Florian Kunth	6–3, 7–5
Win	2–0	Jul 2007	Germany F9, Römerberg	Clay	(Germany) Lars Pörschke	(Jamaica) Dustin Brown (Mexico) Bruno Rodríguez	6–1, 4–6, 6–3
Win	3–0	Jul 2007	Germany F10, Espelkamp	Clay	(Belgium) Ruben Bemelmans	(Netherlands) Remko de Rijke (Netherlands) Bas van der Valk	6–3, 6–3
Win	4–0	Aug 2007	Germany F12, Essen	Clay	(Germany) Benedikt Stronk	(Germany) Ralph Grambow (Austria) Martin Slanar	6–1, 6–2
Win	5–0	Sep 2008	Egypt F5, Cairo	Clay	(Romania) Ioan-Alexandru Cojanu	(Syria) Issam Haitham Taweel (Syria) Hayan Maarouf	7–6^{(7–4)}, 6–1
Loss	5–1	Sep 2008	Burundi F1, Bujumbura	Clay	(Russia) Alexei Filenkov	(South Africa) Hendrik Coertzen (Uganda) Duncan Mugabe	6–7^{(1–7)}, 3–6
Loss	5–2	Sep 2008	Rwanda F1, Kigali	Clay	(Russia) Alexei Filenkov	(Romania) Bogdan-Victor Leonte (Lithuania) Gvidas Sabeckis	6–7^{(2–7)}, 3–6
Win	6–2	Sep 2008	Uganda F1, Kampala	Clay	(Russia) Alexei Filenkov	(Romania) Bogdan-Victor Leonte (Australia) Nick Trkulja	6–3, 6–3
Win	7–2	Nov 2008	Gabon F2, Libreville	Hard	(Germany) Martin Emmrich	(Slovakia) Kamil Čapkovič (Togo) Komlavi Loglo	6–2, 6–0
Loss	7–3	Feb 2009	Ivory Coast F1, Abidjan	Hard	(Portugal) Leonardo Tavares	(Canada) Pierre-Ludovic Duclos (Austria) Andreas Haider-Maurer	1–6, 7–6^{(7–5)}, [12–14]
Win	8–3	Jul 2009	Austria F4, Vandans	Clay	(Germany) Lars Pörschke	(Czech Republic) Karel Tříska (Czech Republic) Roman Vögeli	6–4, 6–4
Loss	8–4	Aug 2010	Germany F11, Wetzlar	Clay	(Czech Republic) Radek Zahraj	(Argentina) Diego Álvarez (Argentina) Juan-Martín Aranguren	4–6, 2–6
Win	9–4	Mar 2012	USA F7, Calabasas	Hard	(Australia) Carsten Ball	(Australia) Nima Roshan (New Zealand) Artem Sitak	7–6^{(9–7)}, 6–4
Loss	9–5	Mar 2012	USA F8, Costa Mesa	Hard	(Australia) Carsten Ball	(United States) Nicolas Meister (Australia) John Peers	3–6, 7–6^{(7–1)}, [15–17]
Loss	9–6	Aug 2012	Germany F12, Wetzlar	Clay	(Mexico) Alejandro Figueroa	(Germany) Steven Moneke (Germany) Tim Pütz	2–6, 0–6
