= 2018 Abierto Mexicano Telcel =

- Date: 26 February – 3 March
- Edition: 25th (men) / 18th (women)
- Draw: 32S / 16D
- Prize money: $1,642,795 (ATP) $250,000 (WTA)
- Surface: Hard, Outdoor
- Location: Acapulco, Mexico
- Venue: Princess Mundo Imperial

Champions

Men's singles
- (Argentina) Juan Martín del Potro

Women's singles
- (Ukraine) Lesia Tsurenko

Men's doubles
- (United Kingdom) Jamie Murray / (Brazil) Bruno Soares

Women's doubles
- (Germany) Tatjana Maria / (United Kingdom) Heather Watson
| ← 2017 · | Mexican Open | · 2019 → |

The 2018 Mexican Open was a professional tennis tournament played on outdoor hard courts. It was the 25th edition of the men's tournament (18th for the women), and part of the 2018 ATP World Tour and the 2018 WTA Tour. It took place in Acapulco, Mexico between 26 February and 3 March 2018, at the Princess Mundo Imperial.

== Points and prize money ==
=== Point distribution ===
| Event | W | F | SF | QF | Round of 16 | Round of 32 | Q | Q2 | Q1 |
| Men's singles | 500 | 300 | 180 | 90 | 45 | 0 | 20 | 10 | 0 |
| Men's doubles | 500 | 300 | 180 | 90 | 0 | — | 45 | 25 | 0 |
| Women's singles | 280 | 180 | 110 | 60 | 30 | 1 | 18 | 12 | 1 |
| Women's doubles | 280 | 180 | 110 | 60 | 1 | — | — | — | — |

=== Prize money ===
| Event | W | F | SF | QF | Round of 16 | Round of 32^{1} | Q2 | Q1 |
| Men's singles | $354,130 | $173,610 | $87,360 | $44,420 | $23,070 | $12,170 | $2,690 | $1,375 |
| Men's doubles * | $106,620 | $52,200 | $26,180 | $13,440 | $6,950 | — | — | — |
| Women's singles | $43,000 | $21,400 | $11,500 | $6,175 | $3,400 | $2,100 | $1,020 | $600 |
| Women's doubles * | $12,300 | $6,400 | $3,435 | $1,820 | $960 | — | — | — |

_{^{1} Qualifiers prize money is also the Round of 32 prize money}
_{* per team}

== ATP singles main-draw entrants ==
=== Seeds ===
| Country | Player | Ranking^{1} | Seed |
|---|---|---|---|
| ~~ESP~~ | ~~Rafael Nadal~~ | ~~2~~ | ~~1~~ |
| GER | Alexander Zverev | 5 | 2 |
| AUT | Dominic Thiem | 6 | 3 |
| USA | Jack Sock | 8 | 4 |
| RSA | Kevin Anderson | 9 | 5 |
| ARG | Juan Martín del Potro | 10 | 6 |
| USA | Sam Querrey | 12 | 7 |
| USA | John Isner | 18 | 8 |

- ^{1} Rankings as of February 19, 2018.

=== Other entrants ===
The following players received wildcards into the main draw:

- (Mexico) Lucas Gómez
- (Australia) Thanasi Kokkinakis
- (United States) Jack Sock

The following players received entry from the qualifying draw:

- (Lithuania) Ričardas Berankis
- (Kazakhstan) Alexander Bublik
- (United States) Ernesto Escobedo
- (United Kingdom) Cameron Norrie

The following players received entry as lucky losers:

- (Japan) Taro Daniel
- (United States) Mackenzie McDonald

=== Withdrawals ===
Before the tournament

- (Croatia) Marin Čilić → replaced by (United States) Donald Young
- (Ukraine) Alexandr Dolgopolov → replaced by (Georgia (country)) Nikoloz Basilashvili
- (United States) Steve Johnson → replaced by (United States) Mackenzie McDonald
- (Australia) Nick Kyrgios → replaced by (Germany) Peter Gojowczyk
- (Spain) Rafael Nadal → replaced by (Japan) Taro Daniel

=== Retirements ===
- (Georgia (country)) Nikoloz Basilashvili

== ATP doubles main-draw entrants ==
=== Seeds ===
| Country | Player | Country | Player | Rank^{1} | Seed |
|---|---|---|---|---|---|
| ~~POL~~ | ~~Łukasz Kubot~~ | ~~BRA~~ | ~~Marcelo Melo~~ | ~~2~~ | ~~1~~ |
| AUT | Oliver Marach | CRO | Mate Pavić | 11 | 2 |
| GBR | Jamie Murray | BRA | Bruno Soares | 17 | 3 |
| USA | Bob Bryan | USA | Mike Bryan | 28 | 4 |

- ^{1} Rankings as of February 19, 2018.

=== Other entrants ===
The following pairs received wildcards into the doubles main draw:

- (El Salvador) Marcelo Arévalo / (Mexico) Miguel Ángel Reyes-Varela
- (Spain) David Marrero / (Spain) Fernando Verdasco

The following pair received entry from the qualifying draw:

- (Moldova) Radu Albot / (Georgia (country)) Nikoloz Basilashvili

The following pair received entry as lucky losers:

- (Belarus) Max Mirnyi / (Austria) Philipp Oswald

=== Withdrawals ===
Before the tournament

- (Brazil) Marcelo Melo

== WTA singles main-draw entrants ==
=== Seeds ===
| Country | Player | Ranking^{1} | Seed |
|---|---|---|---|
| USA | Sloane Stephens | 13 | 1 |
| FRA | Kristina Mladenovic | 14 | 2 |
| AUS | Daria Gavrilova | 26 | 3 |
| CHN | Zhang Shuai | 34 | 4 |
| ROU | Irina-Camelia Begu | 38 | 5 |
| FRA | Alizé Cornet | 40 | 6 |
| UKR | Lesia Tsurenko | 42 | 7 |
| GER | Tatjana Maria | 57 | 8 |

- ^{1} Rankings as of February 19, 2018.

=== Other entrants ===
The following players received wildcards into the main draw:

- (United States) Kayla Day
- (Australia) Daria Gavrilova
- (Mexico) Renata Zarazúa

The following players received entry from the qualifying draw:

- (Croatia) Jana Fett
- (France) Amandine Hesse
- (Italy) Jasmine Paolini
- (Sweden) Rebecca Peterson
- (Netherlands) Arantxa Rus
- (Ukraine) Dayana Yastremska

=== Withdrawals ===
Before the tournament

- (Germany) Mona Barthel → replaced by (Spain) Lara Arruabarrena
- (Belgium) Kirsten Flipkens → replaced by (United States) Madison Brengle
- (Estonia) Kaia Kanepi → replaced by (Switzerland) Stefanie Vögele

=== Retirements ===
- (Ukraine) Kateryna Kozlova
- (Ukraine) Dayana Yastremska

== WTA doubles main-draw entrants ==
=== Seeds ===
| Country | Player | Country | Player | Rank^{1} | Seed |
|---|---|---|---|---|---|
| GBR | Anna Smith | CZE | Renata Voráčová | 82 | 1 |
| AUS | Monique Adamczak | RUS | Natela Dzalamidze | 118 | 2 |
| RUS | Alla Kudryavtseva | AUS | Arina Rodionova | 136 | 3 |
| ESP | Lara Arruabarrena | ESP | Arantxa Parra Santonja | 141 | 4 |

- ^{1} Rankings as of February 19, 2018.

=== Other entrants ===
The following pair received a wildcard into the doubles main draw:

- (Mexico) Ana Sofía Sánchez / (Mexico) Renata Zarazúa

The following pair received entry as alternates:

- (Czech Republic) Kristýna Plíšková / (Switzerland) Stefanie Vögele

=== Withdrawals ===
Before the tournament

- (Netherlands) Bibiane Schoofs

== Champions ==
=== Men's singles ===
- (Argentina) Juan Martín del Potro def. (South Africa) Kevin Anderson, 6–4, 6–4.

=== Women's singles ===
- (Ukraine) Lesia Tsurenko def. (Switzerland) Stefanie Vögele, 5–7, 7–6^{(7–2)}, 6–2.

=== Men's doubles ===
- (United Kingdom) Jamie Murray / (Brazil) Bruno Soares def. (United States) Bob Bryan / (United States) Mike Bryan, 7–6^{(7–4)}, 7–5.

=== Women's doubles ===
- (Germany) Tatjana Maria / (United Kingdom) Heather Watson def. (United States) Kaitlyn Christian / (United States) Sabrina Santamaria, 7–5, 2–6, [10–2].
