= 2016 Abierto Mexicano Telcel =

- Date: 22–27 February
- Edition: 23nd (men) / 16th (women)
- Draw: 32S / 16D
- Prize money: $1,548,755 (ATP) $250,000 (WTA)
- Surface: Hard
- Location: Acapulco, Mexico
- Venue: Princess Mundo Imperial

Champions

Men's singles
- (Austria) Dominic Thiem

Women's singles
- (United States) Sloane Stephens

Men's doubles
- (Philippines) Treat Huey / (Belarus) Max Mirnyi

Women's doubles
- (Spain) Anabel Medina Garrigues / (Spain) Arantxa Parra Santonja
| ← 2015 · | Mexican Open | · 2017 → |

The 2016 Mexican Open was a professional tennis tournament played on outdoor hard courts. It was the 23nd edition of the men's tournament (16th for the women), and part of the 2016 ATP World Tour and the 2016 WTA Tour. It took place in Acapulco, Mexico between 22 and 27 February 2016, at the Princess Mundo Imperial.

== Points and prize money ==
=== Point distribution ===
| Event | W | F | SF | QF | Round of 16 | Round of 32 | Q | Q3 | Q2 | Q1 |
| Men's singles | 500 | 300 | 180 | 90 | 45 | 0 | 20 | — | 10 | 0 |
| Men's doubles | 500 | 300 | 180 | 90 | 0 | — | 45 | — | 25 | 0 |
| Women's singles | 280 | 180 | 110 | 60 | 30 | 1 | 18 | 14 | 10 | 1 |
| Women's doubles | 280 | 180 | 110 | 60 | 1 | — | — | — | — | — |

=== Prize money ===
| Event | W | F | SF | QF | Round of 16 | Round of 32^{1} | Q3 | Q2 | Q1 |
| Men's singles | $343,000 | $154,620 | $73,240 | $35,340 | $18,020 | $9,910 | — | $1,115 | $615 |
| Men's doubles | $101,310 | $45,710 | $21,550 | $10,420 | $5,350 | — | — | — | — |
| Women's singles | $43,000 | $21,400 | $11,300 | $5,900 | $3,310 | $1,925 | $1,005 | $730 | $530 |
| Women's doubles | $12,300 | $6,400 | $3,435 | $1,820 | $960 | — | — | — | — |
Doubles prize money per team

_{^{1} Qualifiers prize money is also the Round of 32 prize money}

== ATP singles main-draw entrants ==
=== Seeds ===
| Country | Player | Ranking^{1} | Seed |
|---|---|---|---|
| ESP | David Ferrer | 6 | 1 |
| JPN | Kei Nishikori | 7 | 2 |
| CRO | Marin Čilić | 12 | 3 |
| AUT | Dominic Thiem | 19 | 4 |
| AUS | Bernard Tomic | 20 | 5 |
| CRO | Ivo Karlović | 26 | 6 |
| BUL | Grigor Dimitrov | 28 | 7 |
| FRA | Jérémy Chardy | 30 | 8 |

- ^{1} Rankings as of February 15, 2016.

=== Other entrants ===
The following players received wildcards into the main draw:

- (Mexico) Lucas Gómez
- (Mexico) Tigre Hank
- (Mexico) Luis Patiño

The following player received entry using a protected ranking:

- (Russia) Dmitry Tursunov

The following players received entry from the qualifying draw:

- (Netherlands) Thiemo de Bakker
- (United States) Taylor Fritz
- (United States) Ryan Harrison
- (United States) Tommy Paul

=== Withdrawals ===
Before the tournament

- (South Africa) Kevin Anderson → replaced by (Israel) Dudi Sela
- (Canada) Milos Raonic → replaced by (Russia) Dmitry Tursunov

=== Retirements ===
- (Croatia) Ivo Karlović (knee injury)

== ATP doubles main-draw entrants ==
=== Seeds ===
| Country | Player | Country | Player | Rank^{1} | Seed |
|---|---|---|---|---|---|
| COL | Juan Sebastián Cabal | COL | Robert Farah | 50 | 1 |
| RSA | Raven Klaasen | USA | Rajeev Ram | 54 | 2 |
| AUT | Alexander Peya | GER | Philipp Petzschner | 63 | 3 |
| PHI | Treat Huey | BLR | Max Mirnyi | 65 | 4 |

- ^{1} Rankings as of February 15, 2016.

=== Other entrants ===
The following pairs received wildcards into the main draw:

- (Israel) Jonathan Erlich / (United Kingdom) Colin Fleming
- (Mexico) César Ramírez / (Mexico) Miguel Ángel Reyes-Varela

The following pair received entry from the qualifying draw:

- (Netherlands) Thiemo de Bakker / (Netherlands) Robin Haase

== WTA singles main-draw entrants ==
=== Seeds ===
| Country | Player | Ranking^{1} | Seed |
|---|---|---|---|
| BLR | Victoria Azarenka | 15 | 1 |
| USA | Sloane Stephens | 24 | 2 |
| RUS | Anastasia Pavlyuchenkova | 25 | 3 |
| GBR | Johanna Konta | 27 | 4 |
| BEL | Alison Van Uytvanck | 42 | 5 |
| SWE | Johanna Larsson | 48 | 6 |
| MNE | Danka Kovinić | 50 | 7 |
| BEL | Yanina Wickmayer | 53 | 8 |

- ^{1} Rankings as of February 15, 2016.

=== Other entrants ===
The following players received wildcards into the main draw:

- (Japan) Naomi Osaka
- (Mexico) Victoria Rodríguez
- (Mexico) Ana Sofía Sánchez

The following player received entry as a special exempt:

- (United States) Shelby Rogers

The following players received entry from the qualifying draw:

- (Netherlands) Kiki Bertens
- (United States) Louisa Chirico
- (United States) Samantha Crawford
- (Israel) Julia Glushko
- (Poland) Urszula Radwańska
- (Greece) Maria Sakkari

=== Withdrawals ===
Before the tournament

- (Romania) Alexandra Dulgheru → replaced by (Spain) Lourdes Domínguez Lino
- (United States) Madison Keys → replaced by (Estonia) Anett Kontaveit
- (Italy) Karin Knapp → replaced by (Spain) Lara Arruabarrena
- (Slovakia) Magdaléna Rybáriková → replaced by (Puerto Rico) Monica Puig

During the tournament

- (Belarus) Victoria Azarenka (left wrist injury)

=== Retirements ===
- (Poland) Urszula Radwańska (left ankle injury)

== WTA doubles main-draw entrants ==
=== Seeds ===
| Country | Player | Country | Player | Rank^{1} | Seed |
|---|---|---|---|---|---|
| ESP | Anabel Medina Garrigues | ESP | Arantxa Parra Santonja | 69 | 1 |
| NED | Kiki Bertens | SWE | Johanna Larsson | 103 | 2 |
| ESP | Lara Arruabarrena | BRA | Paula Cristina Gonçalves | 132 | 3 |
| GBR | Jocelyn Rae | GBR | Anna Smith | 136 | 4 |

- ^{1} Rankings as of February 15, 2016.

=== Other entrants ===
The following pairs received wildcards into the main draw:

- (Russia) Anastasia Pavlyuchenkova / (Belgium) Yanina Wickmayer
- (Mexico) Victoria Rodríguez / (Mexico) Renata Zarazúa

The following pair received entry as alternates:

- (Israel) Julia Glushko / (Sweden) Rebecca Peterson

=== Withdrawals ===
Before the tournament

- (Spain) María-Teresa Torró-Flor (right rib injury)

== Finals ==
=== Men's singles ===
- (Austria) Dominic Thiem defeated (Australia) Bernard Tomic, 7–6^{(8–6)}, 4–6, 6–3

=== Women's singles ===
- (United States) Sloane Stephens defeated (Slovakia) Dominika Cibulková, 6–4, 4–6, 7–6^{(7–5)}

=== Men's doubles ===
- (Philippines) Treat Huey / (Belarus) Max Mirnyi defeated (Germany) Philipp Petzschner / (Austria) Alexander Peya, 7–6^{(7–5)}, 6–3

=== Women's doubles ===
- (Spain) Anabel Medina Garrigues / (Spain) Arantxa Parra Santonja defeated (Netherlands) Kiki Bertens / (Sweden) Johanna Larsson, 6–0, 6–4
