= 2018 Abierto Mexicano Telcel – Women's singles =

Women's singles
- 2018 Abierto Mexicano Telcel

Final
- Champion: (Ukraine) Lesia Tsurenko
- Runner-up: (Switzerland) Stefanie Vögele
- Score: 5–7, 7–6^{(7–2)}, 6–2

Details
- Draw: 32
- Seeds: 8

Events
Singles	men	women
Doubles	men	women
← 2017 ·	Abierto Mexicano Telcel	· 2019 →

Lesia Tsurenko was the reigning champion and successfully defended her title, defeating Stefanie Vögele in the final, 5–7, 7–6^{(7–2)}, 6–2.

== Seeds ==
1. (United States) Sloane Stephens (quarterfinals)
2. (France) Kristina Mladenovic (quarterfinals)
3. (Australia) Daria Gavrilova (semifinals)
4. (China) Zhang Shuai (quarterfinals)
5. (Romania) Irina-Camelia Begu (second round)
6. (France) Alizé Cornet (first round)
7. (Ukraine) Lesia Tsurenko (champion)
8. (Germany) Tatjana Maria (first round)

== Draw ==
Key

- Q = Qualifier
- WC = Wild card
- LL = Lucky loser
- Alt = Alternate
- ITF = ITF entry
- PR = Protected ranking
- SR = Special ranking
- SE = Special exempt
- JE = Junior exempt
- JR = Junior Accelerator Programme entrant
- CO = College Accelerator Programme entrant
- NG = Next Gen Accelerator Program entrant
- w/o = Walkover
- r = Retired
- d = Defaulted

=== Finals ===
Semifinals
(Switzerland) Stefanie Vögele	6	7^{7}
Q	(Sweden) Rebecca Peterson	4	6^{5}
3/WC	(Australia) Daria Gavrilova	2	4
7	(Ukraine) Lesia Tsurenko	6	6

Final
(Switzerland) Stefanie Vögele	7	6^{2}	2
7	(Ukraine) Lesia Tsurenko	5	7^{7}	6

=== Top half ===
First round
1	(United States) S Stephens	6	6
(France) P Parmentier	4	0
WC	(United States) K Day	6	1	0
Q	(Netherlands) A Rus	4	6	6
(Spain) L Arruabarrena	3	6^{1}
(Greece) M Sakkari	6	7^{7}
(Switzerland) S Vögele	6	7
8	(Germany) T Maria	2	5
4	(China) S Zhang	6	6
Q	(Italy) J Paolini	3	1
(Switzerland) J Teichmann	7	7
Q	(Croatia) J Fett	5	5
(Puerto Rico) M Puig	2	6	5
Q	(Ukraine) D Yastremska	6	4	0^{r}
Q	(Sweden) R Peterson	6	6
6	(France) A Cornet	2	4

Second round
1	(United States) S Stephens	5	7^{8}	6
Q	(Netherlands) A Rus	7	6^{6}	0
(Greece) M Sakkari	3	4
(Switzerland) S Vögele	6	6
4	(China) S Zhang	7^{7}	6
(Switzerland) J Teichmann	6^{5}	4
(Puerto Rico) M Puig	1	4
Q	(Sweden) R Peterson	6	6

Quarterfinals
1	(United States) S Stephens	4	7	2
(Switzerland) S Vögele	6	5	6
4	(China) S Zhang	2	1
Q	(Sweden) R Peterson	6	6

Semifinals
(Switzerland) S Vögele	6	7^{7}
Q	(Sweden) R Peterson	4	6^{5}

=== Bottom half ===
First round
5	(Romania) I-C Begu	3	6	6
(United States) C McHale	6	2	4
(Paraguay) V Cepede Royg	4	7^{7}	6
(Switzerland) B Bencic	6	6^{1}	3
(Czech Republic) Kr Plíšková	3	4
WC	(Mexico) R Zarazúa	6	6
(United States) M Brengle	6	3	3
3/WC	(Australia) D Gavrilova	4	6	6
7	(Ukraine) L Tsurenko	6	6
(United States) L Davis	4	1
(Australia) Ar Rodionova	6	1
(Ukraine) K Kozlova	2	0^{r}
(Brazil) B Haddad Maia	7	4	6
(United Kingdom) H Watson	5	6	1
Q	(France) A Hesse	2	2
2	(France) K Mladenovic	6	6

Second round
5	(Romania) I-C Begu	6^{3}	1
(Paraguay) V Cepede Royg	7^{7}	6
WC	(Mexico) R Zarazúa	5	3
3/WC	(Australia) D Gavrilova	7	6
7	(Ukraine) L Tsurenko	6	6
(Australia) Ar Rodionova	3	1
(Brazil) B Haddad Maia	6	3	5
2	(France) K Mladenovic	3	6	7

Quarterfinals
(Paraguay) V Cepede Royg	4	6	2
3/WC	(Australia) D Gavrilova	6	4	6
7	(Ukraine) L Tsurenko	6	6
2	(France) K Mladenovic	2	2

Semifinals
3/WC	(Australia) D Gavrilova	2	4
7	(Ukraine) L Tsurenko	6	6

== Qualifying ==
=== Seeds ===
1. (Croatia) Jana Fett (qualified)
2. (Netherlands) Arantxa Rus (qualified)
3. (Switzerland) Jil Teichmann (moved to main draw)
4. (Sweden) Rebecca Peterson (qualified)
5. (Canada) Carol Zhao (qualifying competition)
6. (Czech Republic) Tereza Martincová (qualifying competition, retired)
7. (Australia) Olivia Rogowska (qualifying competition)
8. (United States) Jamie Loeb (qualifying competition)
9. (Italy) Jasmine Paolini (qualified)
10. (Ukraine) Dayana Yastremska (qualified)
11. (Czech Republic) Marie Bouzková (qualifying competition)
12. (Slovenia) Dalila Jakupović (first round)

=== Qualifiers ===
1. (Croatia) Jana Fett
2. (Netherlands) Arantxa Rus
3. (Italy) Jasmine Paolini
4. (Sweden) Rebecca Peterson
5. (Ukraine) Dayana Yastremska
6. (France) Amandine Hesse

=== Draw ===
==== First qualifier ====
First round
1	(Croatia) Jana Fett	6	6
WC	(Mexico) Victoria Rodríguez	1	1
(Netherlands) Bibiane Schoofs	1	0^{r}
8	(United States) Jamie Loeb	6	1

Qualifying competition
1	(Croatia) Jana Fett	6	4	6
8	(United States) Jamie Loeb	3	6	3

==== Second qualifier ====
First round
2	(Netherlands) Arantxa Rus	6	6
(Ukraine) Olga Ianchuk	2	1
WC	(Mexico) Ana Sofía Sánchez	1	2
11	(Czech Republic) Marie Bouzková	6	6

Qualifying competition
2	(Netherlands) Arantxa Rus	6	6
11	(Czech Republic) Marie Bouzková	3	2

==== Third qualifier ====
First round
Alt	(Israel) Deniz Khazaniuk	6	6
(United States) Jacqueline Cako	1	2
(Chile) Daniela Seguel	6	3	1
9	(Italy) Jasmine Paolini	3	6	6

Qualifying competition
Alt	(Israel) Deniz Khazaniuk	6^{2}	1
9	(Italy) Jasmine Paolini	7^{7}	6

==== Fourth qualifier ====
First round
4	(Sweden) Rebecca Peterson	7	6
(Bulgaria) Elitsa Kostova	5	1
WC	(Spain) Arantxa Parra Santonja	5	6	5
7	(Australia) Olivia Rogowska	7	2	7

Qualifying competition
4	(Sweden) Rebecca Peterson	6	6
7	(Australia) Olivia Rogowska	2	1

==== Fifth qualifier ====
First round
5	(Canada) Carol Zhao	5	6	6
WC	(Mexico) Giuliana Olmos	7	0	1
(United States) Emina Bektas	4	2
10	(Ukraine) Dayana Yastremska	6	6

Qualifying competition
5	(Canada) Carol Zhao	0	2
10	(Ukraine) Dayana Yastremska	6	6

==== Sixth qualifier ====
First round
6	(Czech Republic) Tereza Martincová	6	6
(Spain) Paula Badosa Gibert	4	4
(France) Amandine Hesse	6	2	7^{7}
12	(Slovenia) Dalila Jakupović	2	6	6^{2}

Qualifying competition
6	(Czech Republic) Tereza Martincová	3	1^{r}
(France) Amandine Hesse	6	4
