= 2017 Abierto Mexicano Telcel =

- Date: 27 February – 4 March
- Edition: 24th (men) / 17th (women)
- Draw: 32S / 16D
- Prize money: $ (ATP) $250,000 (WTA)
- Surface: Hard, Outdoor
- Location: Acapulco, Mexico
- Venue: Princess Mundo Imperial

Champions

Men's singles
- (United States) Sam Querrey

Women's singles
- (Ukraine) Lesia Tsurenko

Men's doubles
- (United Kingdom) Jamie Murray / (Brazil) Bruno Soares

Women's doubles
- (Croatia) Darija Jurak / (Australia) Anastasia Rodionova
- Mexican Open

The 2017 Abierto Mexicano Telcel was a professional tennis tournament played on outdoor hard courts. It was the 24th edition of the men's tournament (17th for the women), and part of the 2017 ATP World Tour and the 2017 WTA Tour. It took place in Acapulco, Mexico between 27 February and 4 March 2017, at the Princess Mundo Imperial.

== Points and prize money ==
=== Point distribution ===
| Event | W | F | SF | QF | Round of 16 | Round of 32 | Q | Q3 | Q2 | Q1 |
| Men's singles | 500 | 300 | 180 | 90 | 45 | 0 | 20 | —N/a | 10 | 0 |
| Men's doubles | 500 | 300 | 180 | 90 | 0 | —N/a | 45 | —N/a | 25 | 0 |
| Women's singles | 280 | 180 | 110 | 60 | 30 | 1 | 18 | 14 | 10 | 1 |
| Women's doubles | 280 | 180 | 110 | 60 | 1 | —N/a | —N/a | —N/a | —N/a | —N/a |

=== Prize money ===
| Event | W | F | SF | QF | Round of 16 | Round of 32^{1} | Q3 | Q2 | Q1 |
| Men's singles | $321,290 | $157,510 | $79,260 | $40,305 | $20,930 | $11,040 | —N/a | $2,445 | $1,250 |
| Men's doubles * | $96,730 | $47,360 | $23,760 | $12,190 | $6,300 | —N/a | —N/a | —N/a | —N/a |
| Women's singles | $43,000 | $21,400 | $11,300 | $5,900 | $3,310 | $1,925 | $1,005 | $730 | $530 |
| Women's doubles * | $12,300 | $6,400 | $3,435 | $1,820 | $960 | —N/a | —N/a | —N/a | —N/a |

_{^{1} Qualifiers prize money is also the Round of 32 prize money}
_{* per team}

== ATP singles main-draw entrants ==
=== Seeds ===
| Country | Player | Ranking^{1} | Seed |
|---|---|---|---|
| SRB | Novak Djokovic | 2 | 1 |
| ESP | Rafael Nadal | 6 | 2 |
| CRO | Marin Čilić | 7 | 3 |
| AUT | Dominic Thiem | 8 | 4 |
| BEL | David Goffin | 10 | 5 |
| AUS | Nick Kyrgios | 16 | 6 |
| USA | Jack Sock | 21 | 7 |
| USA | John Isner | 22 | 8 |

- ^{1} Rankings as of February 20, 2017.

=== Other entrants ===
The following players received wildcards into the main draw:

- (Serbia) Novak Djokovic
- (Ukraine) Alexandr Dolgopolov
- (United States) Ernesto Escobedo
- (Mexico) Lucas Gómez

The following player received entry as a special exempt:

- (United States) Donald Young

The following players received entry from the qualifying draw:

- (United States) Taylor Fritz
- (United States) Stefan Kozlov
- (Japan) Yoshihito Nishioka
- (United States) Frances Tiafoe

The following player received entry as a lucky loser:

- (Australia) Jordan Thompson

=== Withdrawals ===
Before the tournament

- (Croatia) Ivo Karlović → replaced by (Israel) Dudi Sela
- (Germany) Alexander Zverev → replaced by (France) Adrian Mannarino
- (Canada) Milos Raonic → replaced by (Australia) Jordan Thompson

During the tournament

- (United States) Steve Johnson

=== Retirements ===
- (Australia) Bernard Tomic (illness)

== ATP doubles main-draw entrants ==
=== Seeds ===
| Country | Player | Country | Player | Rank^{1} | Seed |
|---|---|---|---|---|---|
| GBR | Jamie Murray | BRA | Bruno Soares | 15 | 1 |
| RSA | Raven Klaasen | USA | Rajeev Ram | 27 | 2 |
| POL | Łukasz Kubot | BRA | Marcelo Melo | 28 | 3 |
| PHI | Treat Huey | BLR | Max Mirnyi | 47 | 4 |

- ^{1} Rankings as of February 20, 2017.

=== Other entrants ===
The following pairs received wildcards into the main draw:

- (Mexico) Santiago González / (Spain) David Marrero
- (Mexico) Hans Hach Verdugo / (Mexico) César Ramírez

The following pair received entry from the qualifying draw:

- (Moldova) Radu Albot / (Germany) Mischa Zverev

The following pair received entry as lucky losers:

- (El Salvador) Marcelo Arévalo / (Mexico) Luis Patiño

=== Withdrawals ===
Before the tournament

- (United States) Jack Sock (right shoulder injury)
- (Australia) Jordan Thompson (right hand injury)

== WTA singles main-draw entrants ==
=== Seeds ===
| Country | Player | Ranking^{1} | Seed |
|---|---|---|---|
| CRO | Mirjana Lučić-Baroni | 29 | 1 |
| FRA | Kristina Mladenovic | 31 | 2 |
| LAT | Jeļena Ostapenko | 34 | 3 |
| PUR | Monica Puig | 42 | 4 |
| USA | Christina McHale | 44 | 5 |
| CAN | Eugenie Bouchard | 45 | 6 |
| UKR | Lesia Tsurenko | 52 | 7 |
| GER | Andrea Petkovic | 53 | 8 |

- ^{1} Rankings as of February 20, 2017.

=== Other entrants ===
The following players received wildcards into the main draw:

- (Slovakia) Daniela Hantuchová
- (Mexico) Renata Zarazúa

The following player received entry using a protected ranking:

- (Croatia) Ajla Tomljanović

The following players received entry from the qualifying draw:

- (United States) Jennifer Brady
- (France) Fiona Ferro
- (United States) Jamie Loeb
- (United States) Bethanie Mattek-Sands
- (France) Chloé Paquet
- (United States) Taylor Townsend

=== Withdrawals ===
Before the tournament

- (Italy) Sara Errani → replaced by (Croatia) Mirjana Lučić-Baroni
- (Switzerland) Viktorija Golubic → replaced by (United Kingdom) Heather Watson
- (Romania) Monica Niculescu → replaced by (Croatia) Ajla Tomljanović
- (Russia) Anastasia Pavlyuchenkova → replaced by (Belgium) Kirsten Flipkens

=== Retirements ===
- (Germany) Julia Görges (heat illness)
- (Croatia) Mirjana Lučić-Baroni
- (Croatia) Ajla Tomljanović (right shoulder injury)

== WTA doubles main-draw entrants ==
=== Seeds ===
| Country | Player | Country | Player | Rank^{1} | Seed |
|---|---|---|---|---|---|
| SLO | Andreja Klepač | ESP | María José Martínez Sánchez | 59 | 1 |
| ~~GER~~ | ~~Julia Görges~~ | ~~LAT~~ | ~~Jeļena Ostapenko~~ | ~~81~~ | ~~2~~ |
| CRO | Darija Jurak | AUS | Anastasia Rodionova | 87 | 3 |
| TPE | Chuang Chia-jung | USA | Christina McHale | 113 | 4 |

- ^{1} Rankings as of February 20, 2017.

=== Other entrants ===
The following pair received a wildcard into the main draw:

- (Mexico) Giuliana Olmos / (Mexico) Renata Zarazúa

=== Withdrawals ===
During the tournament

- (Canada) Eugenie Bouchard (abdominal strain)
- (Germany) Julia Görges (heat illness)

== Finals ==
=== Men's singles ===
- (United States) Sam Querrey def. (Spain) Rafael Nadal, 6–3, 7–6^{(7–3)}

=== Women's singles ===
- (Ukraine) Lesia Tsurenko def. (France) Kristina Mladenovic, 6–1, 7–5

=== Men's doubles ===
- (United Kingdom) Jamie Murray / (Brazil) Bruno Soares def. (United States) John Isner / (Spain) Feliciano López, 6–3, 6–3

=== Women's doubles ===
- (Croatia) Darija Jurak / (Australia) Anastasia Rodionova def. (Paraguay) Verónica Cepede Royg / (Colombia) Mariana Duque Mariño, 6–3, 6–2
