= 2018 Abierto Mexicano Telcel – Men's singles =

Men's singles
- 2018 Abierto Mexicano Telcel

Final
- Champion: (Argentina) Juan Martín del Potro
- Runner-up: (South Africa) Kevin Anderson
- Score: 6–4, 6–4

Details
- Draw: 32 (4 Q / 3 WC )
- Seeds: 8

Events
Singles	men	women
Doubles	men	women
- Abierto Mexicano Telcel

Sam Querrey was the defending champion, but lost in the first round to Matthew Ebden.

Juan Martín del Potro won the title, defeating Kevin Anderson in the final, 6–4, 6–4.

== Seeds ==
1. (Spain) Rafael Nadal (withdrew)
2. (Germany) Alexander Zverev (semifinals)
3. (Austria) Dominic Thiem (quarterfinals)
4. (United States) Jack Sock (first round)
5. (South Africa) Kevin Anderson (final)
6. (Argentina) Juan Martín del Potro (champion)
7. (United States) Sam Querrey (first round)
8. (United States) John Isner (first round)

== Draw ==
Key

- Q = Qualifier
- WC = Wild card
- LL = Lucky loser
- Alt = Alternate
- ITF = ITF entry
- PR = Protected ranking
- SR = Special ranking
- SE = Special exempt
- JE = Junior exempt
- JR = Junior Accelerator Programme entrant
- CO = College Accelerator Programme entrant
- NG = Next Gen Accelerator Program entrant
- w/o = Walkover
- r = Retired
- d = Defaulted

=== Finals ===
Semifinals
(United States) Jared Donaldson	3	6	3
5	(South Africa) Kevin Anderson	6	4	6
6	(Argentina) Juan Martín del Potro	6	6
2	(Germany) Alexander Zverev	4	2

Final
5	(South Africa) Kevin Anderson	4	4
6	(Argentina) Juan Martín del Potro	6	6

=== Top half ===
First round
LL	(Japan) T Daniel	6	3	4
(Spain) F López	4	6	6
Q	(Kazakhstan) A Bublik	4	3
WC	(Australia) T Kokkinakis	6	6
(Georgia (country)) N Basilashvili	2	2^{r}
(United States) J Donaldson	6	3
(Australia) M Ebden	6	1	7^{7}
7	(United States) S Querrey	3	6	6^{5}
4/WC	(United States) J Sock	5	6^{3}
Q	(United States) E Escobedo	7	7^{7}
(South Korea) H Chung	7^{7}	6
(United States) D Young	6^{5}	1
(France) A Mannarino	7	6
Q	(Lithuania) R Berankis	5	1
(Moldova) R Albot	4	3
5	(South Africa) K Anderson	6	6

Second round
(Spain) F López	6	6
WC	(Australia) T Kokkinakis	3	4
(United States) J Donaldson	6	6
(Australia) M Ebden	3	1
Q	(United States) E Escobedo	3	1
(South Korea) H Chung	6	6
(France) A Mannarino	3	4
5	(South Africa) K Anderson	6	6

Quarterfinals
(Spain) F López	3	1
(United States) J Donaldson	6	6
(South Korea) H Chung	6^{5}	4
5	(South Africa) K Anderson	7^{7}	6

Semifinals
(United States) J Donaldson	3	6	3
5	(South Africa) K Anderson	6	4	6

=== Bottom half ===
First round
6	(Argentina) JM del Potro	6	6
(Germany) M Zverev	1	2
(Russia) A Rublev	4	3
(Spain) D Ferrer	6	6
(Japan) K Nishikori	7^{7}	3	1
(Canada) D Shapovalov	6^{3}	6	6
Q	(United Kingdom) C Norrie	3	7	5
3	(Austria) D Thiem	6	5	7
8	(United States) J Isner	3	6^{5}
(United States) R Harrison	6	7^{7}
(Argentina) D Schwartzman	6	6
(Spain) F Verdasco	2	4
(Germany) P Gojowczyk	6	6
WC	(Mexico) L Gómez	3	2
LL	(United States) M McDonald	3	5
2	(Germany) A Zverev	6	7

Second round
6	(Argentina) JM del Potro	6	4	6
(Spain) D Ferrer	4	6	3
(Canada) D Shapovalov	2	3
3	(Austria) D Thiem	6	6
(United States) R Harrison	6	5	6
(Argentina) D Schwartzman	3	7	4
(Germany) P Gojowczyk	6^{6}	3
2	(Germany) A Zverev	7^{8}	6

Quarterfinals
6	(Argentina) JM del Potro	6	7^{9}
3	(Austria) D Thiem	2	6^{7}
(United States) R Harrison	4	1
2	(Germany) A Zverev	6	6

Semifinals
6	(Argentina) JM del Potro	6	6
2	(Germany) A Zverev	4	2

== Qualifying ==
=== Seeds ===
1. (Japan) Taro Daniel (qualifying competition, lucky loser)
2. (Lithuania) Ričardas Berankis (qualified)
3. (United Kingdom) Cameron Norrie (qualified)
4. (United States) Ernesto Escobedo (qualified)
5. (Kazakhstan) Alexander Bublik (qualified)
6. (India) Ramkumar Ramanathan (first round)
7. (United States) Mackenzie McDonald (qualifying competition, lucky loser)
8. (United States) Denis Kudla (qualifying competition)

=== Qualifiers ===
1. (Kazakhstan) Alexander Bublik
2. (Lithuania) Ričardas Berankis
3. (United Kingdom) Cameron Norrie
4. (United States) Ernesto Escobedo

=== Lucky losers ===
1. (Japan) Taro Daniel
2. (United States) Mackenzie McDonald

=== Qualifying draw ===
==== First qualifier ====
First round
1	(Japan) Taro Daniel	6	4	6
WC	(Mexico) Alan Fernando Rubio Fierros	1	6	0
(United States) Michael Mmoh	4	6	1
5	(Kazakhstan) Alexander Bublik	6	1	6

Qualifying competition
1	(Japan) Taro Daniel	4	6^{4}
5	(Kazakhstan) Alexander Bublik	6	7^{7}

==== Second qualifier ====
First round
2	(Lithuania) Ričardas Berankis	3	6	6
Alt	(El Salvador) Marcelo Arévalo	6	1	4
(United States) Kevin King	6	6
6	(India) Ramkumar Ramanathan	3	0

Qualifying competition
2	(Lithuania) Ričardas Berankis	6	6
(United States) Kevin King	4	4

==== Third qualifier ====
First round
3	(United Kingdom) Cameron Norrie	6	6
(Canada) Filip Peliwo	0	3
(Canada) Brayden Schnur	3	6	3
8	(United States) Denis Kudla	6	3	6

Qualifying competition
3	(United Kingdom) Cameron Norrie	6	6
8	(United States) Denis Kudla	3	3

==== Fourth qualifier ====
First round
4	(United States) Ernesto Escobedo	6	6
WC	(Mexico) Alejandro Hernández	0	3
WC	(Mexico) Luis Patiño	3	4
7	(United States) Mackenzie McDonald	6	6

Qualifying competition
4	(United States) Ernesto Escobedo	7	7^{7}
7	(United States) Mackenzie McDonald	5	6^{2}
