= 2018 Abierto Mexicano Telcel – Women's doubles =

Women's doubles
- 2018 Abierto Mexicano Telcel

Final
- Champions: (Germany) Tatjana Maria (United Kingdom) Heather Watson
- Runners-up: (United States) Kaitlyn Christian (United States) Sabrina Santamaria
- Score: 7–5, 2–6, [10–2]

Events
Singles	men	women
Doubles	men	women
← 2017 ·	Abierto Mexicano Telcel	· 2019 →

Darija Jurak and Anastasia Rodionova were the defending champions, but Rodionova chose not to participate this year. Jurak played alongside Pauline Parmentier, but lost in the first round to Monica Puig and Sloane Stephens.

Tatjana Maria and Heather Watson won the title, defeating Kaitlyn Christian and Sabrina Santamaria in the final, 7–5, 2–6, [10–2].

== Seeds ==
1. (United Kingdom) Anna Smith / (Czech Republic) Renata Voráčová (quarterfinals)
2. (Australia) Monique Adamczak / (Russia) Natela Dzalamidze (first round)
3. (Russia) Alla Kudryavtseva / (Australia) Arina Rodionova (first round)
4. (Spain) Lara Arruabarrena / (Spain) Arantxa Parra Santonja (semifinals)

== Draw ==
=== Key ===
- Q = Qualifier
- WC = Wild card
- LL = Lucky loser
- Alt = Alternate
- SE = Special exempt
- PR = Protected ranking
- ITF = ITF entry
- JE = Junior exempt
- w/o = Walkover
- r = Retired
- d = Defaulted
- SR = Special ranking

=== Draw ===
First round
1	(United Kingdom) A Smith (Czech Republic) R Voráčová	7^{7}	6
(United States) M Brengle (United States) C McHale	6^{3}	3
(United States) J Cako (Germany) N Geuer	3	4
(United States) K Christian (United States) S Santamaria	6	6
3	(Russia) A Kudryavtseva (Australia) Ar Rodionova	2	3
(Slovenia) D Jakupović (Netherlands) A Rus	6	6
(Puerto Rico) M Puig (United States) S Stephens	6	2	[11]
(Croatia) D Jurak (France) P Parmentier	0	6	[9]
Alt	(Czech Republic) Kr Plíšková (Switzerland) S Vögele	6	4	[8]
WC	(Mexico) AS Sánchez (Mexico) R Zarazúa	4	6	[10]
(Paraguay) V Cepede Royg (Brazil) B Haddad Maia	6	4	[4]
4	(Spain) L Arruabarrena (Spain) A Parra Santonja	4	6	[10]
(Sweden) C Lister (Russia) Y Sizikova	5	6	[9]
(Germany) T Maria (United Kingdom) H Watson	7	4	[11]
(United States) D Krawczyk (Mexico) G Olmos	6	6
2	(Australia) M Adamczak (Russia) N Dzalamidze	3	1

Quarterfinals
1	(United Kingdom) A Smith (Czech Republic) R Voráčová	4	5
(United States) K Christian (United States) S Santamaria	6	7
(Slovenia) D Jakupović (Netherlands) A Rus	4	3
(Puerto Rico) M Puig (United States) S Stephens	6	6
WC	(Mexico) AS Sánchez (Mexico) R Zarazúa	3	2
4	(Spain) L Arruabarrena (Spain) A Parra Santonja	6	6
(Germany) T Maria (United Kingdom) H Watson	4	6	[10]
(United States) D Krawczyk (Mexico) G Olmos	6	4	[3]

Semifinals
(United States) K Christian (United States) S Santamaria	6	6
(Puerto Rico) M Puig (United States) S Stephens	4	4
4	(Spain) L Arruabarrena (Spain) A Parra Santonja	4	1
(Germany) T Maria (United Kingdom) H Watson	6	6

Final
(United States) K Christian (United States) S Santamaria	5	6	[2]
(Germany) T Maria (United Kingdom) H Watson	7	2	[10]
