= 2017 Abierto Mexicano Telcel – Men's singles =

Men's singles
- 2017 Abierto Mexicano Telcel

Final
- Champion: (United States) Sam Querrey
- Runner-up: (Spain) Rafael Nadal
- Score: 6–3, 7–6^{(7–3)}

Details
- Draw: 32 (4 Q / 3 WC )
- Seeds: 8

Events
Singles	men	women
Doubles	men	women
- Abierto Mexicano Telcel

Sam Querrey defeated Rafael Nadal in the final, 6–3, 7–6^{(7–3)} to win the men's singles tennis title at the 2017 Mexican Open.

Dominic Thiem was the defending champion, but lost in the quarterfinals to Querrey.

== Seeds ==
1. (Serbia) Novak Djokovic (quarterfinals)
2. (Spain) Rafael Nadal (final)
3. (Croatia) Marin Čilić (semifinals)
4. (Austria) Dominic Thiem (quarterfinals)
5. (Belgium) David Goffin (second round)
6. (Australia) Nick Kyrgios (semifinals)
7. (United States) Jack Sock (first round)
8. (United States) John Isner (first round)

== Draw ==
Key

- Q = Qualifier
- WC = Wild card
- LL = Lucky loser
- Alt = Alternate
- ITF = ITF entry
- PR = Protected ranking
- SR = Special ranking
- SE = Special exempt
- JE = Junior exempt
- JR = Junior Accelerator Programme entrant
- CO = College Accelerator Programme entrant
- NG = Next Gen Accelerator Program entrant
- w/o = Walkover
- r = Retired
- d = Defaulted

=== Finals ===
Semifinals
6	(Australia) Nick Kyrgios	6	1	5
(United States) Sam Querrey	3	6	7
3	(Croatia) Marin Čilić	1	2
2	(Spain) Rafael Nadal	6	6

Final
(United States) Sam Querrey	6	7^{7}
2	(Spain) Rafael Nadal	3	6^{3}

=== Top half ===
First round
1/WC	(Serbia) N Djokovic	6	7^{7}
(Slovakia) M Kližan	3	6^{4}
(Argentina) JM del Potro	6	3	7^{7}
Q	(United States) F Tiafoe	4	6	6^{1}
(Australia) B Tomic	6^{5}	0^{r}
SE	(United States) D Young	7^{7}	0
(Israel) D Sela	6	3	3
6	(Australia) N Kyrgios	3	6	6
4	(Austria) D Thiem	7^{9}	6
(France) G Simon	6^{7}	3
(France) A Mannarino	3	7^{7}	6
Q	(United States) T Fritz	6	6^{5}	4
(United Kingdom) K Edmund	2	6	3
(United States) S Querrey	6	4	6
(France) S Robert	1	2
5	(Belgium) D Goffin	6	6

Second round
1/WC	(Serbia) N Djokovic	4	6	6
(Argentina) JM del Potro	6	4	4
SE	(United States) D Young	2	4
6	(Australia) N Kyrgios	6	6
4	(Austria) D Thiem	7	6
(France) A Mannarino	5	3
(United States) S Querrey	6	6
5	(Belgium) D Goffin	2	3

Quarterfinals
1/WC	(Serbia) N Djokovic	6^{9}	5
6	(Australia) N Kyrgios	7^{11}	7
4	(Austria) D Thiem	1	5
(United States) S Querrey	6	7

Semifinals
6	(Australia) N Kyrgios	6	1	5
(United States) S Querrey	3	6	7

=== Bottom half ===
First round
8	(United States) J Isner	4	4
(United States) S Johnson	6	6
WC	(United States) E Escobedo	6	2	6
Q	(United States) S Kozlov	1	6	0
WC	(Mexico) L Gómez	1	1
(Croatia) B Ćorić	6	6
WC	(Ukraine) A Dolgopolov	3	6	0
3	(Croatia) M Čilić	6	4	6
7	(United States) J Sock	6	2	1
Q	(Japan) Y Nishioka	3	6	6
LL	(Australia) J Thompson	2	6	6
(Spain) F López	6	3	3
(Italy) P Lorenzi	4	6	6
(Chinese Taipei) Y-h Lu	6	3	4
(Germany) M Zverev	4	3
2	(Spain) R Nadal	6	6

Second round
(United States) S Johnson	7^{7}	6
WC	(United States) E Escobedo	6^{5}	3
(Croatia) B Ćorić	3	6	3
3	(Croatia) M Čilić	6	2	6
Q	(Japan) Y Nishioka	6	3	6
LL	(Australia) J Thompson	4	6	0
(Italy) P Lorenzi	1	1
2	(Spain) R Nadal	6	6

Quarterfinals
(United States) S Johnson
3	(Croatia) M Čilić	w/o
Q	(Japan) Y Nishioka	6^{2}	3
2	(Spain) R Nadal	7^{7}	6

Semifinals
3	(Croatia) M Čilić	1	2
2	(Spain) R Nadal	6	6

== Qualifying ==
=== Seeds ===
1. (United States) Ryan Harrison (qualifying competition)
2. (Australia) Jordan Thompson (qualifying competition, lucky loser)
3. (South Korea) Chung Hyeon (first round)
4. (Moldova) Radu Albot (qualifying competition)
5. (United States) Frances Tiafoe (qualified)
6. (Japan) Yoshihito Nishioka (qualified)
7. (Russia) Konstantin Kravchuk (first round)
8. (United States) Jared Donaldson (qualifying competition)

=== Qualifiers ===
1. (Japan) Yoshihito Nishioka
2. (United States) Taylor Fritz
3. (United States) Stefan Kozlov
4. (United States) Frances Tiafoe

=== Lucky loser ===
1. (Australia) Jordan Thompson

=== Qualifying draw ===
==== First qualifier ====
First round
1	(United States) Ryan Harrison	6	6
PR	(Australia) Matthew Ebden	3	3
Alt	(Germany) Tobias Kamke	4	2
6	(Japan) Yoshihito Nishioka	6	6

Qualifying competition
1	(United States) Ryan Harrison	6	3	2
6	(Japan) Yoshihito Nishioka	3	6	6

==== Second qualifier ====
First round
2	(Australia) Jordan Thompson	6	6
WC	(Mexico) Alan Fernando Rubio Fierros	1	2
(United States) Taylor Fritz	7^{7}	6
7	(Russia) Konstantin Kravchuk	6^{5}	1

Qualifying competition
2	(Australia) Jordan Thompson	7	2	2
(United States) Taylor Fritz	5	6	6

==== Third qualifier ====
First round
3	(South Korea) Chung Hyeon	2	2
(United States) Stefan Kozlov	6	6
WC	(Mexico) Manuel Sánchez	4	3
8	(United States) Jared Donaldson	6	6

Qualifying competition
(United States) Stefan Kozlov	7	6
8	(United States) Jared Donaldson	5	3

==== Fourth qualifier ====
First round
4	(Moldova) Radu Albot	5	6	6
(Colombia) Santiago Giraldo	7	0	2
WC	(Mexico) Kevin Jack Carpenter	3	0
5	(United States) Frances Tiafoe	6	6

Qualifying competition
4	(Moldova) Radu Albot	4	6	3
5	(United States) Frances Tiafoe	6	3	6
