= 2016 Abierto Mexicano Telcel – Men's doubles =

Men's doubles
- 2016 Abierto Mexicano Telcel

Final
- Champions: (Philippines) Treat Huey (Belarus) Max Mirnyi
- Runners-up: (Germany) Philipp Petzschner (Austria) Alexander Peya
- Score: 7–6^{(7–5)}, 6–3

Events
Singles	men	women
Doubles	men	women
← 2015 ·	Abierto Mexicano Telcel	· 2017 →

Ivan Dodig and Marcelo Melo were the defending champions, but chose to compete in Dubai and São Paulo, respectively, instead.
Treat Huey and Max Mirnyi won the title, defeating Philipp Petzschner and Alexander Peya in the final, 7–6^{(7–5)}, 6–3.

== Seeds ==
1. (Colombia) Juan Sebastián Cabal / (Colombia) Robert Farah (semifinals)
2. (South Africa) Raven Klaasen / (United States) Rajeev Ram (first round)
3. (Germany) Philipp Petzschner / (Austria) Alexander Peya (final)
4. (Philippines) Treat Huey / (Belarus) Max Mirnyi (champions)

== Draw ==
=== Key ===
- Q = Qualifier
- WC = Wild card
- LL = Lucky loser
- Alt = Alternate
- SE = Special exempt
- PR = Protected ranking
- ITF = ITF entry
- JE = Junior exempt
- w/o = Walkover
- r = Retired
- d = Defaulted
- SR = Special ranking

=== Draw ===
First round
1	(Colombia) JS Cabal (Colombia) R Farah	6	7^{7}
Q	(Netherlands) T de Bakker (Netherlands) R Haase	4	6^{5}
(United Kingdom) A Bedene (Luxembourg) G Müller	6	3	[10]
(Netherlands) W Koolhof (Netherlands) M Middelkoop	3	6	[7]
4	(Philippines) T Huey (Belarus) M Mirnyi	4	6	[14]
(Australia) C Guccione (Australia) B Tomic	6	3	[12]
(Poland) M Fyrstenberg (Mexico) S González	6	4	[10]
(United States) S Johnson (United States) S Querrey	4	6	[6]
WC	(Israel) J Erlich (United Kingdom) C Fleming	4	7^{7}	[11]
(Croatia) M Pavić (New Zealand) M Venus	6	6^{5}	[9]
WC	(Mexico) C Ramírez (Mexico) MÁ Reyes-Varela	3	7	[10]
3	(Germany) P Petzschner (Austria) A Peya	6	5	[12]
(France) J Chardy (India) L Paes	2	4
(Austria) O Marach (France) F Martin	6	6
(United States) E Butorac (United States) S Lipsky	7^{10}	6
2	(South Africa) R Klaasen (United States) R Ram	6^{8}	0

Quarterfinals
1	(Colombia) JS Cabal (Colombia) R Farah	1	6	[10]
(United Kingdom) A Bedene (Luxembourg) G Müller	6	1	[4]
4	(Philippines) T Huey (Belarus) M Mirnyi	7	6
(Poland) M Fyrstenberg (Mexico) S González	5	2
WC	(Israel) J Erlich (United Kingdom) C Fleming	4	2
3	(Germany) P Petzschner (Austria) A Peya	6	6
(Austria) O Marach (France) F Martin	4	6	[12]
(United States) E Butorac (United States) S Lipsky	6	4	[10]

Semifinals
1	(Colombia) JS Cabal (Colombia) R Farah	6	3	[7]
4	(Philippines) T Huey (Belarus) M Mirnyi	4	6	[10]
3	(Germany) P Petzschner (Austria) A Peya	6	6
(Austria) O Marach (France) F Martin	1	3

Final
4	(Philippines) T Huey (Belarus) M Mirnyi	7^{7}	6
3	(Germany) P Petzschner (Austria) A Peya	6^{5}	3

== Qualifying ==
=== Seeds ===
1. (New Zealand) Marcus Daniell / (New Zealand) Artem Sitak (first round)
2. (Netherlands) Thiemo de Bakker / (Netherlands) Robin Haase (qualified)

=== Qualifiers ===
1. (Netherlands) Thiemo de Bakker / (Netherlands) Robin Haase

=== Qualifying draw ===
First round
1	(New Zealand) Marcus Daniell (New Zealand) Artem Sitak	6	3	[6]
(Moldova) Radu Albot (Bosnia and Herzegovina) Damir Džumhur	1	6	[10]
WC	(Mexico) Daniel Garza (Mexico) Tigre Hank	3	1
2	(Netherlands) Thiemo de Bakker (Netherlands) Robin Haase	6	6

Qualifying competition
(Moldova) Radu Albot (Bosnia and Herzegovina) Damir Džumhur	5	2
2	(Netherlands) Thiemo de Bakker (Netherlands) Robin Haase	7	6
