= 2016 Abierto Mexicano Telcel – Women's doubles =

Women's doubles
- 2016 Abierto Mexicano Telcel

Final
- Champions: (Spain) Anabel Medina Garrigues (Spain) Arantxa Parra Santonja
- Runners-up: (Netherlands) Kiki Bertens (Sweden) Johanna Larsson
- Score: 6–0, 6–4

Events
Singles	men	women
Doubles	men	women
← 2015 ·	Abierto Mexicano Telcel	· 2017 →

Lara Arruabarrena and María Teresa Torró Flor were the defending champions, but chose not to compete together. Arruabarrena played alongside Paula Cristina Gonçalves, but lost in the quarterfinals to María Irigoyen and Paula Kania. Torró Flor was scheduled to team up with Shahar Pe'er, but withdrew before their first round match.
Anabel Medina Garrigues and Arantxa Parra Santonja won the title, defeating Kiki Bertens and Johanna Larsson in the final, 6–0, 6–4.

== Seeds ==
1. (Spain) Anabel Medina Garrigues / (Spain) Arantxa Parra Santonja (champions)
2. (Netherlands) Kiki Bertens / (Sweden) Johanna Larsson (final)
3. (Spain) Lara Arruabarrena / (Brazil) Paula Cristina Gonçalves (quarterfinals)
4. (United Kingdom) Jocelyn Rae / (United Kingdom) Anna Smith (first round)

== Draw ==
=== Key ===
- Q = Qualifier
- WC = Wild card
- LL = Lucky loser
- Alt = Alternate
- SE = Special exempt
- PR = Protected ranking
- ITF = ITF entry
- JE = Junior exempt
- w/o = Walkover
- r = Retired
- d = Defaulted
- SR = Special ranking

First round
1	(Spain) A Medina Garrigues (Spain) A Parra Santonja	6	6
(Japan) S Aoyama (Japan) M Ninomiya	0	2
(Belgium) A-S Mestach (Netherlands) D Schuurs	6	6^{5}	[5]
(Germany) T Maria (United States) M Sanchez	2	7^{7}	[10]
3	(Spain) L Arruabarrena (Brazil) PC Gonçalves	7	6
(Romania) E Bogdan (Switzerland) V Golubic	5	4
(Argentina) M Irigoyen (Poland) P Kania	5	7	[10]
Alt	(Israel) J Glushko (Sweden) R Peterson	7	5	[4]
(New Zealand) M Erakovic (Spain) S Soler Espinosa	4	2
(China) X Han (United States) C McHale	6	6
(Australia) An Rodionova (Kazakhstan) G Voskoboeva	6	7^{7}
4	(United Kingdom) J Rae (United Kingdom) A Smith	0	6^{4}
WC	(Mexico) V Rodríguez (Mexico) R Zarazúa	3	4
WC	(Russia) A Pavlyuchenkova (Belgium) Y Wickmayer	6	6
(United Kingdom) J Konta (United Kingdom) H Watson	6	6^{2}	[8]
2	(Netherlands) K Bertens (Sweden) J Larsson	3	7^{7}	[10]

Quarterfinals
1	(Spain) A Medina Garrigues (Spain) A Parra Santonja	6	6
(Germany) T Maria (United States) M Sanchez	2	3
3	(Spain) L Arruabarrena (Brazil) PC Gonçalves	6	4	[4]
(Argentina) M Irigoyen (Poland) P Kania	4	6	[10]
(China) X Han (United States) C McHale	6	6
(Australia) An Rodionova (Kazakhstan) G Voskoboeva	3	4
WC	(Russia) A Pavlyuchenkova (Belgium) Y Wickmayer	6^{3}	4
2	(Netherlands) K Bertens (Sweden) J Larsson	7^{7}	6

Semifinals
1	(Spain) A Medina Garrigues (Spain) A Parra Santonja	6	6
(Argentina) M Irigoyen (Poland) P Kania	3	4
(China) X Han (United States) C McHale	1	1
2	(Netherlands) K Bertens (Sweden) J Larsson	6	6

Final
1	(Spain) A Medina Garrigues (Spain) A Parra Santonja	6	6
2	(Netherlands) K Bertens (Sweden) J Larsson	0	4
