= 2016 Abierto Mexicano Telcel – Women's singles =

Women's singles
- 2016 Abierto Mexicano Telcel

Final
- Champion: (United States) Sloane Stephens
- Runner-up: (Slovakia) Dominika Cibulková
- Score: 6–4, 4–6, 7–6^{(7–5)}

Details
- Draw: 32
- Seeds: 8

Events
Singles	men	women
Doubles	men	women
- Abierto Mexicano Telcel

Timea Bacsinszky was the defending champion, but chose to compete in Doha instead.

Sloane Stephens won the title, defeating Dominika Cibulková in the final, 6–4, 4–6, 7–6^{(7–5)}.

== Seeds ==
1. (Belarus) Victoria Azarenka (second round, withdrew because of a left wrist injury)
2. (United States) Sloane Stephens (champion)
3. (Russia) Anastasia Pavlyuchenkova (quarterfinals)
4. (United Kingdom) Johanna Konta (second round)
5. (Belgium) Alison Van Uytvanck (first round)
6. (Sweden) Johanna Larsson (quarterfinals)
7. (Montenegro) Danka Kovinić (second round)
8. (Belgium) Yanina Wickmayer (semifinals)

== Draw ==
Key

- Q = Qualifier
- WC = Wild card
- LL = Lucky loser
- Alt = Alternate
- ITF = ITF entry
- PR = Protected ranking
- SR = Special ranking
- SE = Special exempt
- JE = Junior exempt
- JR = Junior Accelerator Programme entrant
- CO = College Accelerator Programme entrant
- NG = Next Gen Accelerator Program entrant
- w/o = Walkover
- r = Retired
- d = Defaulted

=== Finals ===
Semifinals
(Slovakia) Dominika Cibulková	6	6
(United States) Christina McHale	3	3
8	(Belgium) Yanina Wickmayer	2	0
2	(United States) Sloane Stephens	6	6

Final
(Slovakia) Dominika Cibulková	4	6	6^{5}
2	(United States) Sloane Stephens	6	4	7^{7}

=== Top half ===
First round
1	(Belarus) V Azarenka	4	6	6
(Slovenia) P Hercog	6	3	1
(Spain) L Domínguez Lino	0	0
(Slovakia) D Cibulková	6	6
SE	(United States) S Rogers	7^{8}	6
(United States) A Tatishvili	6^{6}	0
Q	(Greece) M Sakkari	2	3
6	(Sweden) J Larsson	6	6
4	(United Kingdom) J Konta	6	3	6
(Estonia) A Kontaveit	3	6	4
(United States) I Falconi	2	3
(Croatia) M Lučić-Baroni	6	6
(United States) C McHale	4	6	7^{7}
(United Kingdom) H Watson	6	0	6^{1}
(Germany) T Maria	6^{6}	2
7	(Montenegro) D Kovinić	7^{8}	6

Second round
1	(Belarus) V Azarenka
(Slovakia) D Cibulková	w/o
SE	(United States) S Rogers	1	7^{7}	5
6	(Sweden) J Larsson	6	6^{2}	7
4	(United Kingdom) J Konta	6	2	5
(Croatia) M Lučić-Baroni	4	6	7
(United States) C McHale	3	6	6
7	(Montenegro) D Kovinić	6	3	2

Quarterfinals
(Slovakia) D Cibulková	3	6	6
6	(Sweden) J Larsson	6	2	3
(Croatia) M Lučić-Baroni	4	7^{9}	2
(United States) C McHale	6	6^{7}	6

Semifinals
(Slovakia) D Cibulková	6	6
(United States) C McHale	3	3

=== Bottom half ===
First round
8	(Belgium) Y Wickmayer	6^{5}	6	7^{7}
WC	(Mexico) V Rodríguez	7^{7}	0	6^{2}
Q	(United States) S Crawford	4	4
(Puerto Rico) M Puig	6	6
Q	(Israel) J Glushko	6	6
WC	(Mexico) AS Sánchez	4	1
Q	(Poland) U Radwańska	0	3^{r}
3	(Russia) A Pavlyuchenkova	6	2
5	(Belgium) A Van Uytvanck	6	4	4
(Colombia) M Duque Mariño	4	6	6
Q	(Netherlands) K Bertens	4	2
WC	(Japan) N Osaka	6	6
(Belarus) O Govortsova	6	6
(Spain) L Arruabarrena	1	2
Q	(United States) L Chirico	6	3	3
2	(United States) S Stephens	1	6	6

Second round
8	(Belgium) Y Wickmayer	3	6	6
(Puerto Rico) M Puig	6	3	3
Q	(Israel) J Glushko	2	1
3	(Russia) A Pavlyuchenkova	6	6
(Colombia) M Duque Mariño	3	6^{4}
WC	(Japan) N Osaka	6	7^{7}
(Belarus) O Govortsova	4	1
2	(United States) S Stephens	6	6

Quarterfinals
8	(Belgium) Y Wickmayer	6	7^{7}
3	(Russia) A Pavlyuchenkova	3	6^{3}
WC	(Japan) N Osaka	3	5
2	(United States) S Stephens	6	7

Semifinals
8	(Belgium) Y Wickmayer	2	0
2	(United States) S Stephens	6	6

== Qualifying ==
=== Seeds ===
1. (United States) Lauren Davis (qualifying competition)
2. (Netherlands) Kiki Bertens (qualified)
3. (Poland) Urszula Radwańska (qualified)
4. (United States) Samantha Crawford (qualified)
5. (France) Pauline Parmentier (qualifying competition)
6. (China) Han Xinyun (qualifying competition)
7. (United States) Louisa Chirico (qualified)
8. (Israel) Julia Glushko (qualified)
9. (Spain) María Teresa Torró Flor (qualifying competition)
10. (Greece) Maria Sakkari (qualified)
11. (Sweden) Rebecca Peterson (first round)
12. (Switzerland) Viktorija Golubic (qualifying competition)

=== Qualifiers ===
1. (Israel) Julia Glushko
2. (Netherlands) Kiki Bertens
3. (Poland) Urszula Radwańska
4. (United States) Samantha Crawford
5. (United States) Louisa Chirico
6. (Greece) Maria Sakkari

=== Draw ===
==== First qualifier ====
First round
1	(United States) Lauren Davis	6	6
(Belgium) An-Sophie Mestach	1	1
(United States) Sachia Vickery	1	1
8	(Israel) Julia Glushko	6	6

Qualifying competition
1	(United States) Lauren Davis	1	7	1
8	(Israel) Julia Glushko	6	5	6

==== Second qualifier ====
First round
2	(Netherlands) Kiki Bertens	6	6
(Australia) Anastasia Rodionova	2	3
WC	(Mexico) Renata Zarazúa	2	5
12	(Switzerland) Viktorija Golubic	6	7

Qualifying competition
2	(Netherlands) Kiki Bertens	6	6
12	(Switzerland) Viktorija Golubic	1	3

==== Third qualifier ====
First round
3	(Poland) Urszula Radwańska	6	6
WC	(United States) Nicole Frenkel	3	2
(Netherlands) Richèl Hogenkamp	5	6	6
11	(Sweden) Rebecca Peterson	7	3	3

Qualifying competition
3	(Poland) Urszula Radwańska	6	4	6
(Netherlands) Richèl Hogenkamp	4	6	3

==== Fourth qualifier ====
First round
4	(United States) Samantha Crawford	6	7
(Spain) Sílvia Soler Espinosa	3	5
(Poland) Paula Kania	1	3
9	(Spain) María Teresa Torró Flor	6	6

Qualifying competition
4	(United States) Samantha Crawford	6	3	7^{7}
9	(Spain) María Teresa Torró Flor	3	6	6^{4}

==== Fifth qualifier ====
First round
5	(France) Pauline Parmentier	6	6
(Venezuela) Andrea Gámiz	4	4
WC	(Mexico) Pamela López Cervantes	0	0
7	(United States) Louisa Chirico	6	6

Qualifying competition
5	(France) Pauline Parmentier	2	4
7	(United States) Louisa Chirico	6	6

==== Sixth qualifier ====
First round
6	(China) Han Xinyun	5	6	6
(United States) Maria Sanchez	7	4	2
Alt	(Japan) Makoto Ninomiya	1	2
10	(Greece) Maria Sakkari	6	6

Qualifying competition
6	(China) Han Xinyun	6^{3}	0
10	(Greece) Maria Sakkari	7^{7}	6
