= 2017 Abierto Mexicano Telcel – Men's doubles =

Tennis tournament

Men's doubles
- 2017 Abierto Mexicano Telcel

Final
- Champions: (United Kingdom) Jamie Murray (Brazil) Bruno Soares
- Runners-up: (United States) John Isner (Spain) Feliciano López
- Score: 6–3, 6–3

Events
Singles	men	women
Doubles	men	women
← 2016 ·	Abierto Mexicano Telcel	· 2018 →

Treat Huey and Max Mirnyi were the defending champions, but lost in the first round to Oliver Marach and Fabrice Martin.

Jamie Murray and Bruno Soares won the title, defeating John Isner and Feliciano López in the final, 6–3, 6–3.

== Seeds ==
1. (United Kingdom) Jamie Murray / (Brazil) Bruno Soares (champions)
2. (South Africa) Raven Klaasen / (United States) Rajeev Ram (quarterfinals)
3. (Poland) Łukasz Kubot / (Brazil) Marcelo Melo (first round)
4. (Philippines) Treat Huey / (Belarus) Max Mirnyi (first round)

== Draw ==
=== Key ===
- Q = Qualifier
- WC = Wild card
- LL = Lucky loser
- Alt = Alternate
- SE = Special exempt
- PR = Protected ranking
- ITF = ITF entry
- JE = Junior exempt
- w/o = Walkover
- r = Retired
- d = Defaulted
- SR = Special ranking

=== Draw ===
First round
1	(United Kingdom) J Murray (Brazil) B Soares	6	2	[10]
(Croatia) M Čilić (Croatia) N Mektić	3	6	[8]
WC	(Mexico) H Hach Verdugo (Mexico) C Ramírez	3	4
(United States) S Lipsky (United States) S Querrey	6	6
3	(Poland) Ł Kubot (Brazil) M Melo	6^{3}	3
WC	(Mexico) S González (Spain) D Marrero	7^{7}	6
(Colombia) JS Cabal (Colombia) R Farah	5	6^{3}
PR	(Germany) P Petzschner (Pakistan) A-u-H Qureshi	7	7^{7}
LL	(El Salvador) M Arévalo (Mexico) L Patiño	6	2	[3]
Q	(Moldova) R Albot (Germany) M Zverev	4	6	[10]
(Austria) O Marach (France) F Martin	6	1	[11]
4	(Philippines) T Huey (Belarus) M Mirnyi	1	6	[9]
(United States) J Isner (Spain) F López	7	6
(Italy) P Lorenzi (Australia) B Tomic	5	2
(Sweden) R Lindstedt (New Zealand) M Venus	3	4
2	(South Africa) R Klaasen (United States) R Ram	6	6

Quarterfinals
1	(United Kingdom) J Murray (Brazil) B Soares	6	6
(United States) S Lipsky (United States) S Querrey	1	3
WC	(Mexico) S González (Spain) D Marrero	4	2
PR	(Germany) P Petzschner (Pakistan) A-u-H Qureshi	6	6
Q	(Moldova) R Albot (Germany) M Zverev	5	7^{7}	[9]
(Austria) O Marach (France) F Martin	7	6^{1}	[11]
(United States) J Isner (Spain) F López	6	7
2	(South Africa) R Klaasen (United States) R Ram	2	5

Semifinals
1	(United Kingdom) J Murray (Brazil) B Soares	6	7^{7}
PR	(Germany) P Petzschner (Pakistan) A-u-H Qureshi	4	6^{1}
(Austria) O Marach (France) F Martin	3	6	[14]
(United States) J Isner (Spain) F López	6	4	[16]

Final
1	(United Kingdom) J Murray (Brazil) B Soares	6	6
(United States) J Isner (Spain) F López	3	3

== Qualifying ==
=== Seeds ===
1. (India) Purav Raja / (India) Divij Sharan (first round)
2. (France) Adrian Mannarino / (Australia) Jordan Thompson (qualifying competition)

=== Qualifiers ===
1. (Moldova) Radu Albot / (Germany) Mischa Zverev

=== Lucky losers ===
1. (El Salvador) Marcelo Arévalo / (Mexico) Luis Patiño

=== Qualifying draw ===
First round
1	(India) Purav Raja (India) Divij Sharan	1	4
(Moldova) Radu Albot (Germany) Mischa Zverev	6	6
WC	(El Salvador) Marcelo Arévalo (Mexico) Luis Patiño	2	3
2	(France) Adrian Mannarino (Australia) Jordan Thompson	6	6

Qualifying competition
(Moldova) Radu Albot (Germany) Mischa Zverev	6	6
2	(France) Adrian Mannarino (Australia) Jordan Thompson	2	1
