= 2017 Abierto Mexicano Telcel – Women's doubles =

Women's doubles
- 2017 Abierto Mexicano Telcel

Final
- Champions: (Croatia) Darija Jurak (Australia) Anastasia Rodionova
- Runners-up: (Paraguay) Verónica Cepede Royg (Colombia) Mariana Duque Mariño
- Score: 6–3, 6–2

Events
Singles	men	women
Doubles	men	women
← 2016 ·	Abierto Mexicano Telcel	· 2018 →

Anabel Medina Garrigues and Arantxa Parra Santonja were the defending champions, but chose not to participate this year.

Darija Jurak and Anastasia Rodionova won the title, defeating Verónica Cepede Royg and Mariana Duque Mariño in the final, 6–3, 6–2.

== Seeds ==
1. (Slovenia) Andreja Klepač / (Spain) María José Martínez Sánchez (first round)
2. (Germany) Julia Görges / (Latvia) Jeļena Ostapenko (withdrew)
3. (Croatia) Darija Jurak / (Australia) Anastasia Rodionova (champions)
4. (Chinese Taipei) Chuang Chia-jung / (United States) Christina McHale (quarterfinals)

== Draw ==
=== Key ===
- Q = Qualifier
- WC = Wild card
- LL = Lucky loser
- Alt = Alternate
- SE = Special exempt
- PR = Protected ranking
- ITF = ITF entry
- JE = Junior exempt
- w/o = Walkover
- r = Retired
- d = Defaulted
- SR = Special ranking

First round
1	(Slovenia) A Klepač (Spain) MJ Martínez Sánchez	3	4
(Montenegro) D Kovinić (Poland) A Rosolska	6	6
(Germany) A Beck (Germany) A Petkovic	0	2
(United States) A Muhammad (United States) T Townsend	6	6
4	(Chinese Taipei) C-j Chuang (United States) C McHale	6^{2}	6	[10]
WC	(Mexico) G Olmos (Mexico) R Zarazúa	7^{7}	4	[8]
(Paraguay) V Cepede Royg (Colombia) M Duque Mariño	7^{7}	2	[11]
(United States) J Cako (Germany) N Geuer	6^{5}	6	[9]
(United States) A Weinhold (United States) C Whoriskey	4	6	[8]
(United States) M Brengle (United States) N Gibbs	6	4	[10]
(France) P Parmentier (Belgium) Y Wickmayer	6	6^{2}	[8]
3	(Croatia) D Jurak (Australia) An Rodionova	3	7^{7}	[10]
(Netherlands) D Schuurs (Czech Republic) R Voráčová	6	6^{6}	[10]
(Ukraine) K Bondarenko (Germany) T Maria	3	7^{8}	[6]
(Canada) E Bouchard (Belgium) K Flipkens	w/o
2	(Germany) J Görges (Latvia) J Ostapenko

Quarterfinals
(Montenegro) D Kovinić (Poland) A Rosolska	2	3
(United States) A Muhammad (United States) T Townsend	6	6
4	(Chinese Taipei) C-j Chuang (United States) C McHale	6	4	[5]
(Paraguay) V Cepede Royg (Colombia) M Duque Mariño	4	6	[10]
(United States) M Brengle (United States) N Gibbs	3	6	[6]
3	(Croatia) D Jurak (Australia) An Rodionova	6	2	[10]
(Netherlands) D Schuurs (Czech Republic) R Voráčová	w/o
(Canada) E Bouchard (Belgium) K Flipkens

Semifinals
(United States) A Muhammad (United States) T Townsend	2	3
(Paraguay) V Cepede Royg (Colombia) M Duque Mariño	6	6
3	(Croatia) D Jurak (Australia) An Rodionova	7	7^{7}
(Netherlands) D Schuurs (Czech Republic) R Voráčová	5	6^{4}

Final
(Paraguay) V Cepede Royg (Colombia) M Duque Mariño	3	2
3	(Croatia) D Jurak (Australia) An Rodionova	6	6
