= 2016 Abierto Mexicano Telcel – Men's singles =

Men's singles
- 2016 Abierto Mexicano Telcel

Final
- Champion: (Austria) Dominic Thiem
- Runner-up: (Australia) Bernard Tomic
- Score: 7–6^{(8–6)}, 4–6, 6–3

Details
- Draw: 32
- Seeds: 8

Events
Singles	men	women
Doubles	men	women
- Abierto Mexicano Telcel

David Ferrer was the defending champion, but lost to Alexandr Dolgopolov in the second round.

Dominic Thiem won the title, defeating Bernard Tomic in the final, 7–6^{(8–6)}, 4–6, 6–3.

== Seeds ==
1. (Spain) David Ferrer (second round)
2. (Japan) Kei Nishikori (second round)
3. (Croatia) Marin Čilić (first round)
4. (Austria) Dominic Thiem (champion)
5. (Australia) Bernard Tomic (final)
6. (Croatia) Ivo Karlović (first round, retired)
7. (Bulgaria) Grigor Dimitrov (quarterfinals)
8. (France) Jérémy Chardy (first round)

== Draw ==
Key

- Q = Qualifier
- WC = Wild card
- LL = Lucky loser
- Alt = Alternate
- ITF = ITF entry
- PR = Protected ranking
- SR = Special ranking
- SE = Special exempt
- JE = Junior exempt
- JR = Junior Accelerator Programme entrant
- CO = College Accelerator Programme entrant
- NG = Next Gen Accelerator Program entrant
- w/o = Walkover
- r = Retired
- d = Defaulted

=== Finals ===
Semifinals
(Ukraine) Alexandr Dolgopolov	6	4	3
5	(Australia) Bernard Tomic	1	6	6
4	(Austria) Dominic Thiem	6	6
(United States) Sam Querrey	2	2

Final
5	(Australia) Bernard Tomic	6^{6}	6	3
4	(Austria) Dominic Thiem	7^{8}	4	6

=== Top half ===
First round
1	(Spain) D Ferrer	6	6
(Australia) J Millman	4	2
(United States) S Johnson	5	6^{4}
(Ukraine) A Dolgopolov	7	7^{7}
WC	(Mexico) L Patiño	1	2
(Netherlands) R Haase	6	6
(United Kingdom) A Bedene	6	1
6	(Croatia) I Karlović	4	2^{r}
3	(Croatia) M Čilić	3	6	2
Q	(United States) R Harrison	6	3	6
(Ukraine) I Marchenko	6	7^{7}
Q	(United States) T Paul	2	6^{4}
WC	(Mexico) T Hank	1	2
(France) A Mannarino	6	6
(United States) R Ram	5	3
5	(Australia) B Tomic	7	6

Second round
1	(Spain) D Ferrer	4	4
(Ukraine) A Dolgopolov	6	6
(Netherlands) R Haase	6	6^{3}	6
(United Kingdom) A Bedene	4	7^{7}	4
Q	(United States) R Harrison	6^{3}	6	6^{5}
(Ukraine) I Marchenko	7^{7}	4	7^{7}
(France) A Mannarino	4	4
5	(Australia) B Tomic	6	6

Quarterfinals
(Ukraine) A Dolgopolov	6	6
(Netherlands) R Haase	3	3
(Ukraine) I Marchenko	5	5
5	(Australia) B Tomic	7	7

Semifinals
(Ukraine) A Dolgopolov	6	4	3
5	(Australia) B Tomic	1	6	6

=== Bottom half ===
First round
7	(Bulgaria) G Dimitrov	7	6
(United States) D Kudla	5	1
(United States) D Young	6	6
(Luxembourg) G Müller	3	3
PR	(Russia) D Tursunov	6	3	7
(Australia) S Groth	4	6	5
(Bosnia and Herzegovina) D Džumhur	6^{3}	3
4	(Austria) D Thiem	7^{7}	6
8	(France) J Chardy	4	6	3
Q	(United States) T Fritz	6	3	6
WC	(Mexico) L Gómez	4	2
(Dominican Republic) V Estrella Burgos	6	6
(United States) S Querrey	6	6
(Israel) D Sela	2	0
Q	(Netherlands) T de Bakker	0	3
2	(Japan) K Nishikori	6	6

Second round
7	(Bulgaria) G Dimitrov	6	6
(United States) D Young	3	4
PR	(Russia) D Tursunov	7^{7}	3	4
4	(Austria) D Thiem	6^{5}	6	6
Q	(United States) T Fritz	6	6
(Dominican Republic) V Estrella Burgos	1	3
(United States) S Querrey	6	6
2	(Japan) K Nishikori	4	3

Quarterfinals
7	(Bulgaria) G Dimitrov	5	2
4	(Austria) D Thiem	7	6
Q	(United States) T Fritz	6	4	4
(United States) S Querrey	2	6	6

Semifinals
4	(Austria) D Thiem	6	6
(United States) S Querrey	2	2

== Qualifying ==
=== Seeds ===
1. (Netherlands) Thiemo de Bakker (qualified)
2. (United States) Taylor Fritz (qualified)
3. (Moldova) Radu Albot (first round)
4. (United States) Ryan Harrison (qualified)
5. (Australia) John-Patrick Smith (qualifying competition)
6. (United States) Dennis Novikov (first round)
7. (Spain) Adrián Menéndez-Maceiras (qualifying competition)
8. (United States) Alexander Sarkissian (qualifying competition)

=== Qualifiers ===
1. (Netherlands) Thiemo de Bakker
2. (United States) Taylor Fritz
3. (United States) Tommy Paul
4. (United States) Ryan Harrison

=== Qualifying draw ===
==== First qualifier ====
First round
1	(Netherlands) Thiemo de Bakker	6	6
Alt	(Colombia) Eduardo Struvay	3	4
Alt	(Italy) Alessandro Giannessi	6^{6}	7^{7}	6
6	(United States) Dennis Novikov	7^{8}	6^{4}	1

Qualifying competition
1	(Netherlands) Thiemo de Bakker	6	3	6
Alt	(Italy) Alessandro Giannessi	4	6	2

==== Second qualifier ====
First round
2	(United States) Taylor Fritz	6	6
WC	(Mexico) Manuel Sánchez	1	2
(India) Somdev Devvarman	1	5
7	(Spain) Adrián Menéndez-Maceiras	6	7

Qualifying competition
2	(United States) Taylor Fritz	6	6
7	(Spain) Adrián Menéndez-Maceiras	3	2

==== Third qualifier ====
First round
3	(Moldova) Radu Albot	6	6^{4}	2
Alt	(United States) Tommy Paul	1	7^{7}	6
Alt	(El Salvador) Marcelo Arévalo	4	4
5	(Australia) John-Patrick Smith	6	6

Qualifying competition
Alt	(United States) Tommy Paul	3	6	6
5	(Australia) John-Patrick Smith	6	3	2

==== Fourth qualifier ====
First round
4	(United States) Ryan Harrison	6	6
WC	(Mexico) Hans Hach Verdugo	3	4
WC	(Mexico) Andrés Zepeda	2	0
8	(United States) Alexander Sarkissian	6	6

Qualifying competition
4	(United States) Ryan Harrison	6	6
8	(United States) Alexander Sarkissian	1	4
