= 2017 Abierto Mexicano Telcel – Women's singles =

Women's singles
- 2017 Abierto Mexicano Telcel

Final
- Champion: (Ukraine) Lesia Tsurenko
- Runner-up: (France) Kristina Mladenovic
- Score: 6–1, 7–5

Details
- Draw: 32
- Seeds: 8

Events
Singles	men	women
Doubles	men	women
- Abierto Mexicano Telcel

Sloane Stephens was the defending champion, but could not participate this year as she was recovering from a left foot surgery.

Lesia Tsurenko won the title, defeating Kristina Mladenovic in the final, 6–1, 7–5.

== Seeds ==
1. (Croatia) Mirjana Lučić-Baroni (semifinals, retired)
2. (France) Kristina Mladenovic (final)
3. (Latvia) Jeļena Ostapenko (quarterfinals)
4. (Puerto Rico) Monica Puig (quarterfinals)
5. (United States) Christina McHale (semifinals)
6. (Canada) Eugenie Bouchard (first round)
7. (Ukraine) Lesia Tsurenko (champion)
8. (Germany) Andrea Petkovic (second round)

== Draw ==
Key

- Q = Qualifier
- WC = Wild card
- LL = Lucky loser
- Alt = Alternate
- ITF = ITF entry
- PR = Protected ranking
- SR = Special ranking
- SE = Special exempt
- JE = Junior exempt
- JR = Junior Accelerator Programme entrant
- CO = College Accelerator Programme entrant
- NG = Next Gen Accelerator Program entrant
- w/o = Walkover
- r = Retired
- d = Defaulted

=== Finals ===
Semifinals
1	(Croatia) Mirjana Lučić-Baroni	0^{r}
7	(Ukraine) Lesia Tsurenko	5
5	(United States) Christina McHale	5	6	2
2	(France) Kristina Mladenovic	7	4	6

Final
7	(Ukraine) Lesia Tsurenko	6	7
2	(France) Kristina Mladenovic	1	5

=== Top half ===
First round
1	(Croatia) M Lučić-Baroni	7	6
(Switzerland) B Bencic	5	4
(United States) L Chirico	2	2
(United States) S Rogers	6	6
(France) P Parmentier	7	6^{6}	6
(United States) N Gibbs	5	7^{8}	2
Q	(United States) J Loeb	6	1	3
8	(Germany) A Petkovic	2	6	6
3	(Latvia) J Ostapenko	6	6
(Montenegro) D Kovinić	2	2
(United States) M Brengle	4	6	6
(Germany) A Beck	6	3	2
(Germany) J Görges	2	6	6
(Ukraine) K Bondarenko	6	4	3
Q	(France) C Paquet	2	1
7	(Ukraine) L Tsurenko	6	6

Second round
1	(Croatia) M Lučić-Baroni	6	6
(United States) S Rogers	4	4
(France) P Parmentier	6	3	6
8	(Germany) A Petkovic	4	6	1
3	(Latvia) J Ostapenko	7	6
(United States) M Brengle	5	4
(Germany) J Görges	1	0^{r}
7	(Ukraine) L Tsurenko	6	2

Quarterfinals
1	(Croatia) M Lučić-Baroni	6	6
(France) P Parmentier	2	3
3	(Latvia) J Ostapenko	3	6^{5}
7	(Ukraine) L Tsurenko	6	7^{7}

Semifinals
1	(Croatia) M Lučić-Baroni	0^{r}
7	(Ukraine) L Tsurenko	5

=== Bottom half ===
First round
5	(United States) C McHale	6	6
Q	(France) F Ferro	4	4
Q	(United States) J Brady	5	6^{4}
Q	(United States) T Townsend	7	7^{7}
WC	(Slovakia) D Hantuchová	4	6	6
(Belgium) Y Wickmayer	6	3	2
(Italy) F Schiavone	4	6^{4}
4	(Puerto Rico) M Puig	6	7^{7}
6	(Canada) E Bouchard	6^{4}	1
PR	(Croatia) A Tomljanović	7^{7}	6
(Belgium) K Flipkens	7	6^{1}	6
WC	(Mexico) R Zarazúa	5	7^{7}	1
(United Kingdom) H Watson	7	6
Q	(United States) B Mattek-Sands	5	3
(United States) V Lepchenko	2	3
2	(France) K Mladenovic	6	6

Second round
5	(United States) C McHale	6	7^{7}
Q	(United States) T Townsend	1	6^{5}
WC	(Slovakia) D Hantuchová	4	4
4	(Puerto Rico) M Puig	6	6
PR	(Croatia) A Tomljanović	5	0^{r}
(Belgium) K Flipkens	7	0
(United Kingdom) H Watson	6^{4}	7^{7}	5
2	(France) K Mladenovic	7^{7}	6^{5}	7

Quarterfinals
5	(United States) C McHale	6	6
4	(Puerto Rico) M Puig	2	2
(Belgium) K Flipkens	4	3
2	(France) K Mladenovic	6	6

Semifinals
5	(United States) C McHale	5	6	2
2	(France) K Mladenovic	7	4	6

== Qualifying ==
=== Seeds ===
1. (United States) Jennifer Brady (qualified)
2. (Germany) Tatjana Maria (qualifying competition)
3. (New Zealand) Marina Erakovic (qualifying competition)
4. (Colombia) Mariana Duque Mariño (qualifying competition)
5. (United States) Taylor Townsend (qualified)
6. (Paraguay) Verónica Cepede Royg (qualifying competition)
7. (United States) Asia Muhammad (qualifying competition)
8. (United States) Sachia Vickery (qualifying competition)
9. (Bulgaria) Elitsa Kostova (first round)
10. (United States) Samantha Crawford (first round)
11. (United States) Jamie Loeb (qualified)
12. (United States) Bethanie Mattek-Sands (qualified)

=== Qualifiers ===
1. (United States) Jennifer Brady
2. (France) Fiona Ferro
3. (United States) Jamie Loeb
4. (United States) Bethanie Mattek-Sands
5. (United States) Taylor Townsend
6. (France) Chloé Paquet

=== Draw ===
==== First qualifier ====
First round
1	(United States) Jennifer Brady	6	6
WC	(Mexico) Emma Reyes Baca	0	3
(Czech Republic) Marie Bouzková	1	5
7	(United States) Asia Muhammad	6	7

Qualifying competition
1	(United States) Jennifer Brady	6	6
7	(United States) Asia Muhammad	1	3

==== Second qualifier ====
First round
2	(Germany) Tatjana Maria	6	6
(Argentina) Nadia Podoroska	3	1
(France) Fiona Ferro	3	7	7
10	(United States) Samantha Crawford	6	5	5

Qualifying competition
2	(Germany) Tatjana Maria	4	3
(France) Fiona Ferro	6	6

==== Third qualifier ====
First round
3	(New Zealand) Marina Erakovic	6	6
WC	(Mexico) Giovanna Manifacio	2	2
(United States) Jacqueline Cako	2	2
11	(United States) Jamie Loeb	6	6

Qualifying competition
3	(New Zealand) Marina Erakovic	4	0
11	(United States) Jamie Loeb	6	6

==== Fourth qualifier ====
First round
4	(Colombia) Mariana Duque Mariño	6	6
(Canada) Françoise Abanda	1	4
WC	(Mexico) Giuliana Olmos	6	3	3
12	(United States) Bethanie Mattek-Sands	3	6	6

Qualifying competition
4	(Colombia) Mariana Duque Mariño	0	1
12	(United States) Bethanie Mattek-Sands	6	6

==== Fifth qualifier ====
First round
5	(United States) Taylor Townsend	6	6
(Argentina) Catalina Pella	1	4
(Israel) Deniz Khazaniuk	0	6	1
8	(United States) Sachia Vickery	6	4	6

Qualifying competition
5	(United States) Taylor Townsend	7^{7}	7
8	(United States) Sachia Vickery	6^{5}	5

==== Sixth qualifier ====
First round
6	(Paraguay) Verónica Cepede Royg	6	6
WC	(Mexico) Victoria Rodríguez	1	2
(France) Chloé Paquet	7^{9}	6
9	(Bulgaria) Elitsa Kostova	6^{7}	3

Qualifying competition
6	(Paraguay) Verónica Cepede Royg	5	3
(France) Chloé Paquet	7	6
