= Mexican Open (tennis) =

Coordinates: 16°47′16″N 99°48′42″W

Abierto Mexicano Telcel p/b HSBC
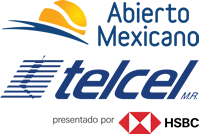

Tournament information
- Tour: ATP Tour; WTA Tour
- Founded: 1993; 33 years ago (ATP); 2001; 25 years ago (WTA)
- Abolished: 2020 (WTA)
- Location: Mexico City (1993–1998, 2000); Acapulco (2001–present); Mexico
- Venue: Club Alemán (1993–1998, 2000); Fairmont Acapulco Princess (2001–2021); Arena GNP Seguros (2022–present)
- Surface: Clay – outdoors (1993–2013); Hard – outdoors (2014–present)
- Website: abiertomexicanodetenis.com

Current champions (2026)
- Men's singles: (Italy) Flavio Cobolli
- Men's doubles: (Brazil) Marcelo Melo (Germany) Alexander Zverev
ATP Tour
- Category: ATP Tour 500
- Draw: 32S / 16Q / 16D
- Prize money: US$2,469,450 (2026)
WTA Tour
- Category: WTA International
- Draw: 32S / 24Q / 16D
- Prize money: US$275,000 (2020)

The Mexican Open (currently sponsored by Telcel and HSBC and called the Abierto Mexicano Telcel presented by HSBC) is an ATP Tour professional tennis tournament played on outdoor hardcourts, part of the ATP 500 series. It is usually held annually in late February, early March at the Arena GNP Seguros since 2022 and previously at the Fairmont Acapulco Princess, both in Acapulco, Mexico. It was played on outdoor red clay courts until 2013 when it switched to hardcourts in 2014. Until 2020 it was one of the WTA International tournaments on the WTA Tour. Mexican players Leonardo Lavalle (1993 and 1995 in Mexico City) and Giuliana Olmos (2020) have won the Doubles event.

The tournament was introduced on the ATP Tour in 1993, and began on the WTA Tour in 2001. It was held in Mexico City from 1993 to 1998, and once more in 2000, before being relocated to Acapulco in 2001. It was the closing leg of the four-ATP tournament Golden Swing. Starting in 2014, the Mexican Open's surface changed from clay to hardcourts, serving as a lead-up to the first ATP Tour Masters 1000 event of the season in Indian Wells, United States. The winner traditionally receives a giant silver gourd trophy.

== History ==
In the men's singles, Rafael Nadal (2005, 2013, 2020, 2022), David Ferrer (2010–2012, 2015) and Thomas Muster (1993–1996) hold the record for most overall titles (four each), with Muster holding the record for most consecutive wins (four). On the women's side, Amanda Coetzer (2001, 2003), Flavia Pennetta (2005, 2008), Venus Williams (2009–10), Sara Errani (2012–13), and Lesia Tsurenko (2017–18) co-hold the record for most singles titles (two), Williams, Errani and Tsurenko being the only players to score two straight wins in Mexico. In the men's doubles, Donald Johnson (1996, 2000–01) has won the most titles (three), and co-holds with Michal Mertiňák (2008–09) and David Marrero (2012–13) the record for most back-to-back titles (two). In the women's doubles, María José Martínez Sánchez (2001, 2008–09) is the one holding the most titles (three) and shares with Nuria Llagostera Vives (2008–09) the record for most consecutive wins (two).

=== Men's singles ===
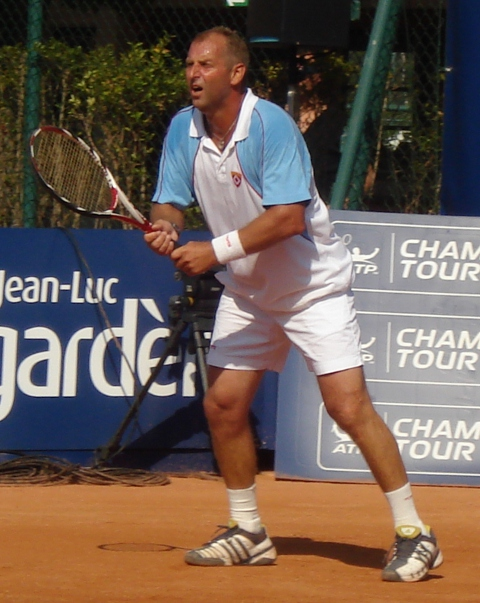
Thomas Muster (1993–96) holds a record-tying four titles overall, and the most consecutive titles (four) in Mexico.

Year	Champion	Runner-up	Score
↓ ATP Tour 250 (Note: Known as World Series from 1990 till 1999. International Series from 2000 till 2008.) ↓
1993	(Austria) Thomas Muster	(Spain) Carlos Costa	6–2, 6–4
1994	(Austria) Thomas Muster (2)	(Brazil) Roberto Jabali	6–3, 6–1
1995	(Austria) Thomas Muster (3)	(Brazil) Fernando Meligeni	7–6^{(7–4)}, 7–5
1996	(Austria) Thomas Muster (4)	(Czech Republic) Jiří Novák	7–6^{(7–3)}, 6–2
1997	(Spain) Francisco Clavet	(Spain) Joan Albert Viloca	6–4, 7–6^{(9–7)}
1998	(Czech Republic) Jiří Novák	(Belgium) Xavier Malisse	6–3, 6–3
1999	Not held		
↓ ATP Tour 500 (Note: Known as International Series Gold from 2000 till 2008.) ↓
2000	(Argentina) Juan Ignacio Chela	(Argentina) Mariano Puerta	6–4, 7–6^{(7–4)}
2001	(Brazil) Gustavo Kuerten	(Spain) Galo Blanco	6–4, 6–2
2002	(Spain) Carlos Moyà	(Brazil) Fernando Meligeni	7–6^{(7–4)}, 7–6^{(7–4)}
2003	(Argentina) Agustín Calleri	(Argentina) Mariano Zabaleta	7–5, 3–6, 6–3
2004	(Spain) Carlos Moyà (2)	(Spain) Fernando Verdasco	6–3, 6–0
2005	(Spain) Rafael Nadal	(Spain) Álbert Montañés	6–1, 6–0
2006	(Peru) Luis Horna	(Argentina) Juan Ignacio Chela	7–6^{(8–6)}, 6–4
2007	(Argentina) Juan Ignacio Chela (2)	(Spain) Carlos Moyà	6–3, 7–6^{(7–2)}
2008	(Spain) Nicolás Almagro	(Argentina) David Nalbandian	6–1, 7–6^{(7–1)}
2009	(Spain) Nicolás Almagro (2)	(France) Gaël Monfils	6–4, 6–4
2010	(Spain) David Ferrer	(Spain) Juan Carlos Ferrero	6–3, 3–6, 6–1
2011	(Spain) David Ferrer (2)	(Spain) Nicolás Almagro	7–6^{(7–4)}, 6–7^{(2–7)}, 6–2
2012	(Spain) David Ferrer (3)	(Spain) Fernando Verdasco	6–1, 6–2
2013	(Spain) Rafael Nadal (2)	(Spain) David Ferrer	6–0, 6–2
2014 (Note: Changed from clay court to hard court.)	(Bulgaria) Grigor Dimitrov	(South Africa) Kevin Anderson	7–6^{(7–1)}, 3–6, 7–6^{(7–5)}
2015	(Spain) David Ferrer (4)	(Japan) Kei Nishikori	6–3, 7–5
2016	(Austria) Dominic Thiem	(Australia) Bernard Tomic	7–6^{(8–6)}, 4–6, 6–3
2017	(United States) Sam Querrey	(Spain) Rafael Nadal	6–3, 7–6^{(7–3)}
2018	(Argentina) Juan Martín del Potro	(South Africa) Kevin Anderson	6–4, 6–4
2019	(Australia) Nick Kyrgios	(Germany) Alexander Zverev	6–3, 6–4
2020	(Spain) Rafael Nadal (3)	(United States) Taylor Fritz	6–3, 6–2
2021	(Germany) Alexander Zverev	(Greece) Stefanos Tsitsipas	6–4, 7–6^{(7–3)}
2022	(Spain) Rafael Nadal (4)	(United Kingdom) Cameron Norrie	6–4, 6–4
2023	(Australia) Alex de Minaur	(United States) Tommy Paul	3–6, 6–4, 6–1
2024	(Australia) Alex de Minaur (2)	(Norway) Casper Ruud	6–4, 6–4
2025	(Czech Republic) Tomáš Macháč	(Spain) Alejandro Davidovich Fokina	7–6^{(8–6)}, 6–2
2026	(Italy) Flavio Cobolli	(United States) Frances Tiafoe	7–6^{(7–4)}, 6–4

=== Women's singles ===
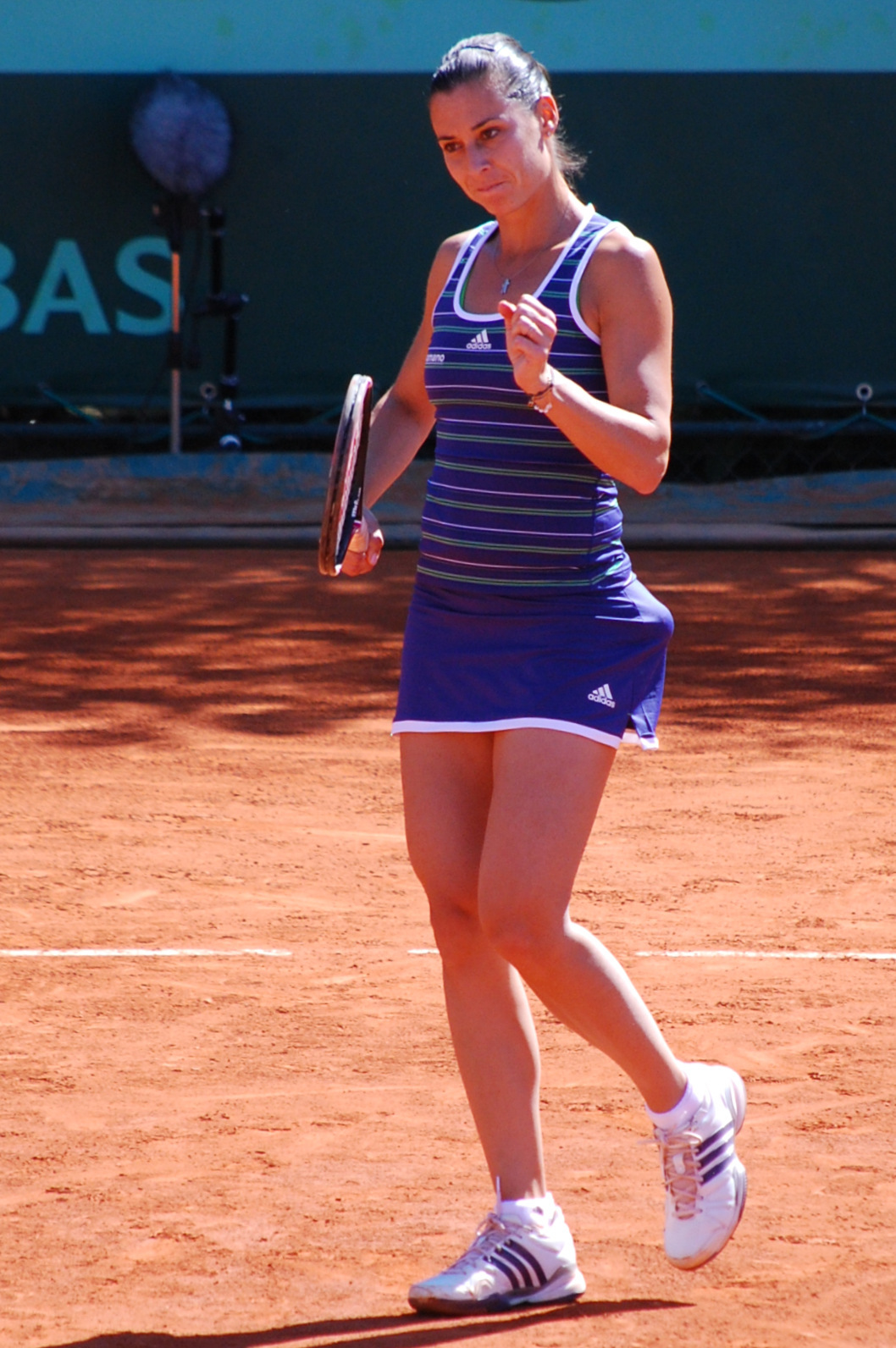
Two-time champion Flavia Pennetta (2005, 2008) also holds the record for most finals in Mexico with seven (runner-up finishes in 2004, 2006–07, 2009, 2012).

Year	Champion	Runner-up	Score
↓ Tier III ↓
2001	(South Africa) Amanda Coetzer	(Russia) Elena Dementieva	2–6, 6–1, 6–2
2002	(Slovenia) Katarina Srebotnik	(Argentina) Paola Suárez	6–7^{(1–7)}, 6–4, 6–2
2003	(South Africa) Amanda Coetzer (2)	(Argentina) Mariana Díaz Oliva	7–5, 6–3
2004	(Czech Republic) Iveta Benešová	(Italy) Flavia Pennetta	7–6^{(7–5)}, 6–4
2005	(Italy) Flavia Pennetta	(Slovakia) Ľudmila Cervanová	3–6, 7–5, 6–3
2006	(Germany) Anna-Lena Grönefeld	(Italy) Flavia Pennetta	6–1, 4–6, 6–2
2007	(France) Émilie Loit	(Italy) Flavia Pennetta	7–6^{(7–0)}, 6–4
2008	(Italy) Flavia Pennetta (2)	(France) Alizé Cornet	6–0, 4–6, 6–1
↓ International ↓
2009	(United States) Venus Williams	(Italy) Flavia Pennetta	6–1, 6–2
2010	(United States) Venus Williams (2)	(Slovenia) Polona Hercog	2–6, 6–2, 6–3
2011	(Argentina) Gisela Dulko	(Spain) Arantxa Parra Santonja	6–3, 7–6^{(7–5)}
2012	(Italy) Sara Errani	(Italy) Flavia Pennetta	5–7, 7–6^{(7–2)}, 6–0
2013	(Italy) Sara Errani (2)	(Spain) Carla Suárez Navarro	6–0, 6–4
2014	(Slovakia) Dominika Cibulková	(United States) Christina McHale	7–6^{(7–3)}, 4–6, 6–4
2015	(Switzerland) Timea Bacsinszky	(France) Caroline Garcia	6–3, 6–0
2016	(United States) Sloane Stephens	(Slovakia) Dominika Cibulková	6–4, 4–6, 7–6^{(7–5)}
2017	(Ukraine) Lesia Tsurenko	(France) Kristina Mladenovic	6–1, 7–5
2018	(Ukraine) Lesia Tsurenko (2)	(Switzerland) Stefanie Vögele	5–7, 7–6^{(7–2)}, 6–2
2019	(China) Wang Yafan	(United States) Sofia Kenin	2–6, 6–3, 7–5
2020	(United Kingdom) Heather Watson	(Canada) Leylah Annie Fernandez	6–4, 6–7^{(8–10)}, 6–1

=== Men's doubles ===
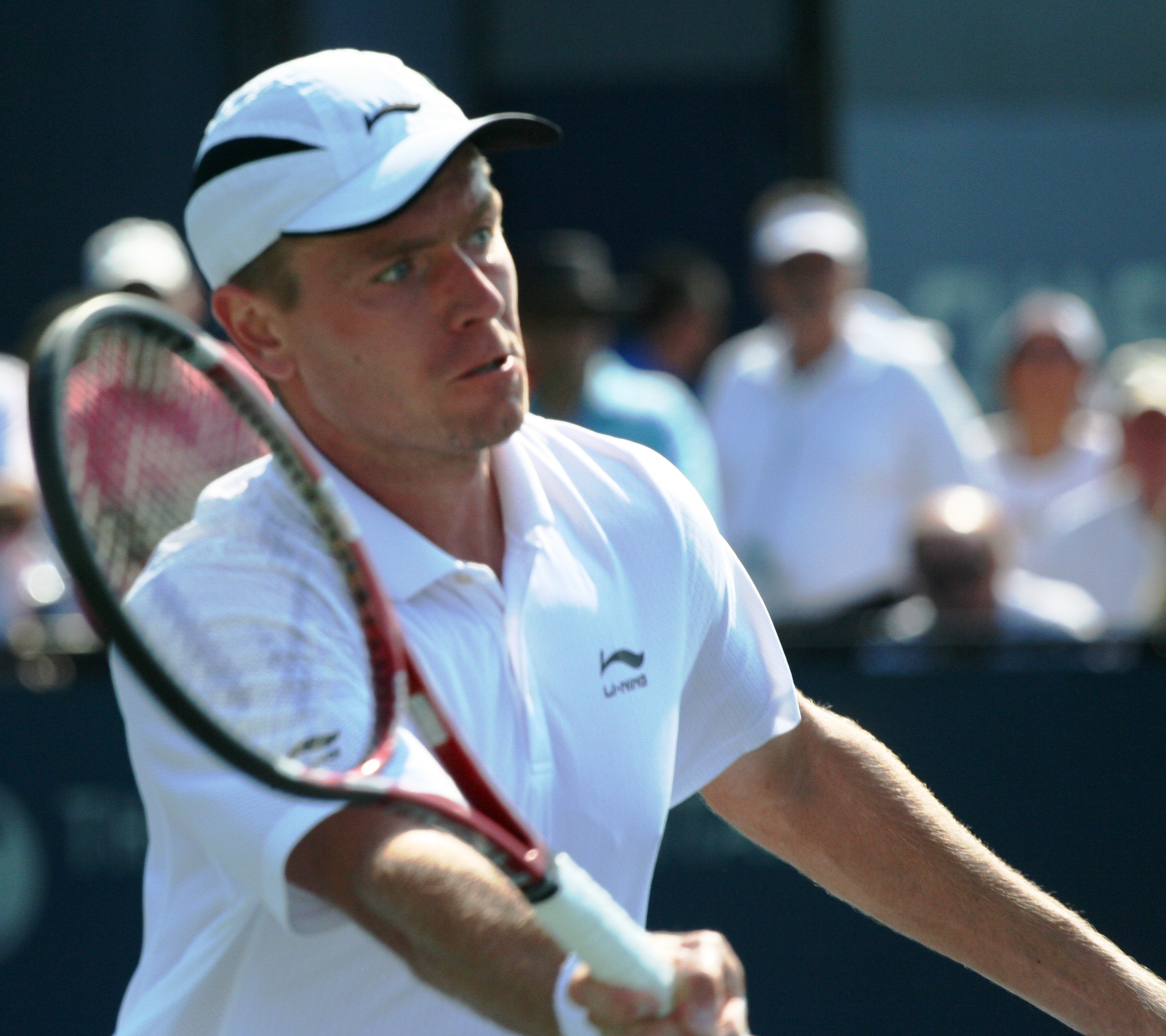
Michal Mertiňák (2008–09) holds, with Donald Johnson (2000–01), David Marrero (2012–13), Jamie Murray (2017–18) and Bruno Soares (2017–18) the men's doubles record for most consecutive titles (two).

Year	Champions	Runners-up	Score
↓ ATP Tour 250 ↓
1993	(Mexico) Leonardo Lavalle (Brazil) Jaime Oncins	(Argentina) Horacio de la Peña (Mexico) Jorge Lozano	7–6, 6–4
1994	(United States) Francisco Montana (United States) Bryan Shelton	(United States) Luke Jensen (United States) Murphy Jensen	6–3, 6–4
1995	(Argentina) Javier Frana (Mexico) Leonardo Lavalle (2)	(Germany) Marc-Kevin Goellner (Italy) Diego Nargiso	7–5, 6–3
1996	(United States) Donald Johnson (United States) Francisco Montana (2)	(Venezuela) Nicolás Pereira (Spain) Emilio Sánchez	6–2, 6–4
1997	(Ecuador) Nicolás Lapentti (Argentina) Daniel Orsanic	(Mexico) Luis Herrera (Mexico) Mariano Sánchez	4–6, 6–3, 7–6
1998	(Czech Republic) Jiří Novák (Czech Republic) David Rikl	(Argentina) Daniel Orsanic (Mexico) David Roditi	6–4, 6–2
1999	Not held		
↓ ATP Tour 500 ↓
2000	(Zimbabwe) Byron Black (United States) Donald Johnson (2)	(Argentina) Gastón Etlis (Argentina) Martín Rodríguez	6–3, 7–5
2001	(United States) Donald Johnson (3) (Brazil) Gustavo Kuerten	(South Africa) David Adams (Argentina) Martín García	6–3, 7–6^{(7–5)}
2002	(United States) Bob Bryan (United States) Mike Bryan	(Czech Republic) Martin Damm (Czech Republic) David Rikl	6–1, 3–6, [10–2]
2003	(The Bahamas) Mark Knowles (Canada) Daniel Nestor	(Spain) David Ferrer (Spain) Fernando Vicente	6–3, 6–3
2004	(United States) Bob Bryan (2) (United States) Mike Bryan (2)	(Argentina) Juan Ignacio Chela (Chile) Nicolás Massú	6–2, 6–3
2005	(Spain) David Ferrer (Spain) Santiago Ventura	(Czech Republic) Jiří Vaněk (Czech Republic) Tomáš Zíb	4–6, 6–1, 6–4
2006	(Czech Republic) František Čermák (Czech Republic) Leoš Friedl	(Italy) Potito Starace (Italy) Filippo Volandri	7–5, 6–2
2007	(Italy) Potito Starace (Argentina) Martín Vassallo Argüello	(Czech Republic) Lukáš Dlouhý (Czech Republic) Pavel Vízner	6–0, 6–2
2008	(Austria) Oliver Marach (Slovakia) Michal Mertiňák	(Argentina) Agustín Calleri (Peru) Luis Horna	6–2, 6–7^{(3–7)}, [10–7]
2009	(Czech Republic) František Čermák (2) (Slovakia) Michal Mertiňák (2)	(Poland) Łukasz Kubot (Austria) Oliver Marach	4–6, 6–4, [10–7]
2010	(Poland) Łukasz Kubot (Austria) Oliver Marach (2)	(Italy) Fabio Fognini (Italy) Potito Starace	6–0, 6–0
2011	(Romania) Victor Hănescu (Romania) Horia Tecău	(Brazil) Marcelo Melo (Brazil) Bruno Soares	6–1, 6–3
2012	(Spain) David Marrero (Spain) Fernando Verdasco	(Spain) Marcel Granollers (Spain) Marc López	6–3, 6–4
2013	(Poland) Łukasz Kubot (2) (Spain) David Marrero (2)	(Italy) Simone Bolelli (Italy) Fabio Fognini	7–5, 6–2
2014	(South Africa) Kevin Anderson (Australia) Matthew Ebden	(Spain) Feliciano López (Belarus) Max Mirnyi	6–3, 6–3
2015	(Croatia) Ivan Dodig (Brazil) Marcelo Melo	(Poland) Mariusz Fyrstenberg (Mexico) Santiago González	7–6^{(7–2)}, 5–7, [10–3]
2016	(Philippines) Treat Huey (Belarus) Max Mirnyi	(Germany) Philipp Petzschner (Austria) Alexander Peya	7–6^{(7–5)}, 6–3
2017	(United Kingdom) Jamie Murray (Brazil) Bruno Soares	(United States) John Isner (Spain) Feliciano López	6–3, 6–3
2018	(United Kingdom) Jamie Murray (2) (Brazil) Bruno Soares (2)	(United States) Bob Bryan (United States) Mike Bryan	7–6^{(7–4)}, 7–5
2019	(Germany) Alexander Zverev (Germany) Mischa Zverev	(United States) Austin Krajicek (New Zealand) Artem Sitak	2–6, 7–6^{(7–4)}, [10–5]
2020	(Poland) Łukasz Kubot (3) (Brazil) Marcelo Melo (2)	(Colombia) Juan Sebastián Cabal (Colombia) Robert Farah	7–6^{(8–6)}, 6–7^{(4–7)}, [11–9]
2021	(United Kingdom) Ken Skupski (United Kingdom) Neal Skupski	(Spain) Marcel Granollers (Argentina) Horacio Zeballos	7–6^{(7–3)}, 6–4
2022	(Spain) Feliciano López (Greece) Stefanos Tsitsipas	(El Salvador) Marcelo Arévalo (Netherlands) Jean-Julien Rojer	7–5, 6–4
2023	(Austria) Alexander Erler (Austria) Lucas Miedler	(United States) Nathaniel Lammons (United States) Jackson Withrow	7–6^{(11–9)}, 7–6^{(7–3)}
2024	(Monaco) Hugo Nys (Poland) Jan Zieliński	(Mexico) Santiago González (United Kingdom) Neal Skupski	6–3, 6–2
2025	(United States) Christian Harrison (United States) Evan King	(France) Sadio Doumbia (France) Fabien Reboul	6–4, 6–0
2026	(Brazil) Marcelo Melo (3) (Germany) Alexander Zverev (2)	(Austria) Alexander Erler (United States) Robert Galloway	6–3, 6–4

=== Women's doubles ===
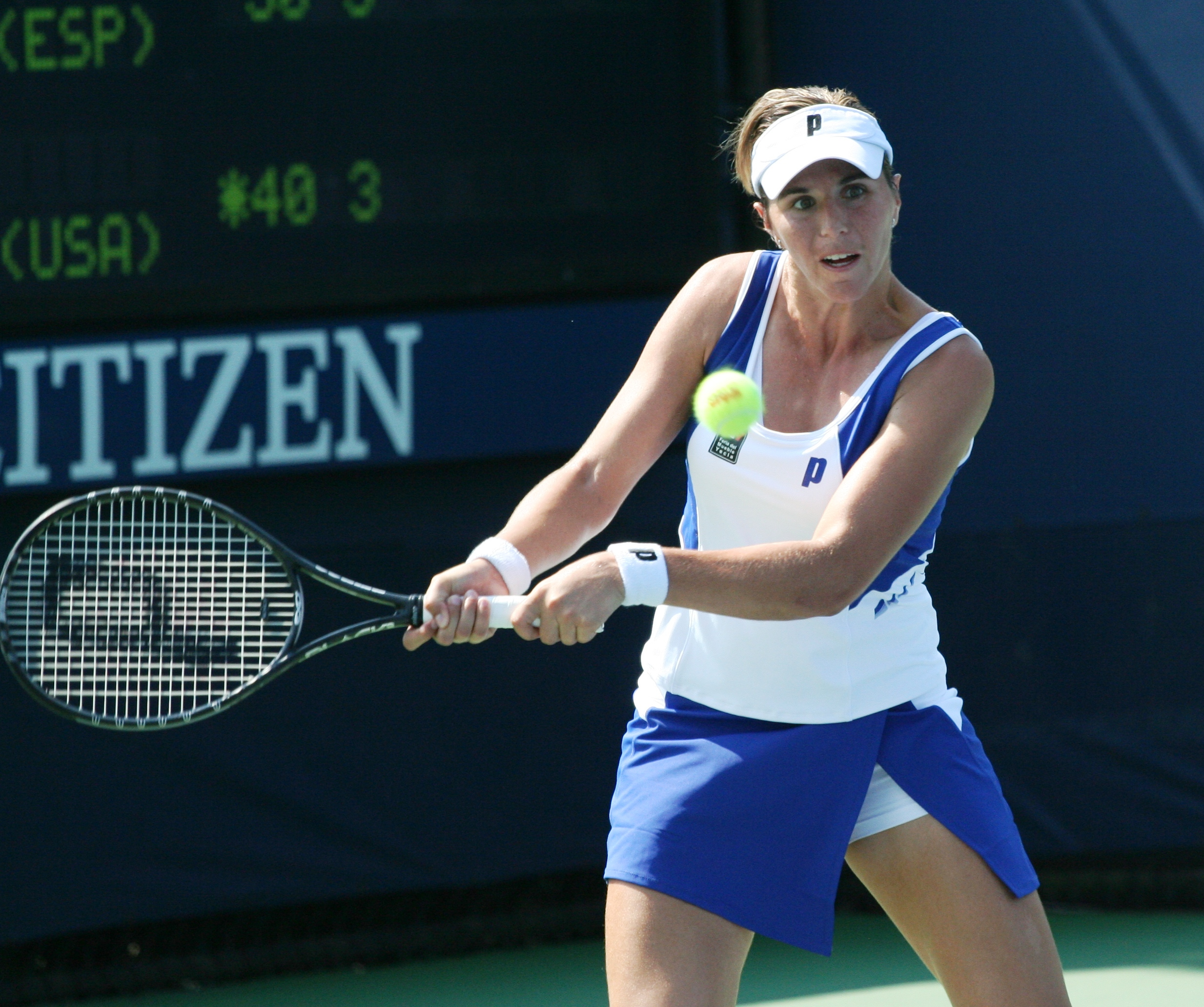
María José Martínez Sánchez (2001, 2008–09) is the only women's doubles three-time champion in Acapulco.

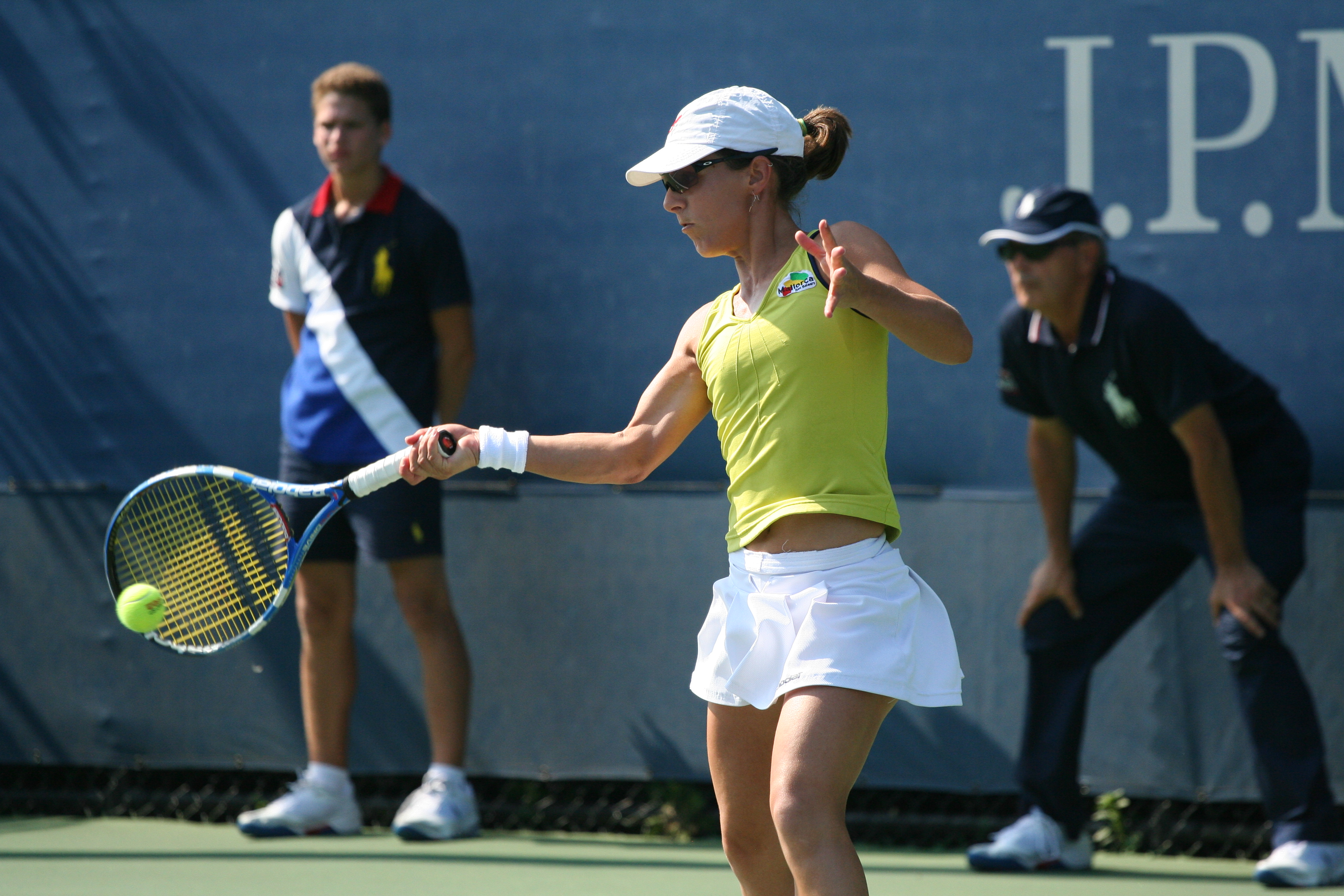
Nuria Llagostera Vives (2008–09) shares with Martínez Sánchez the record for back-to-back titles (two).

Year	Champions	Runners-up	Score
2001	(Spain) María José Martínez Sánchez (Spain) Anabel Medina Garrigues	(Spain) Virginia Ruano Pascual (Argentina) Paola Suárez	6–4, 6–7^{(5–7)}, 7–5
2002	(Spain) Virginia Ruano Pascual (Argentina) Paola Suárez	(Slovenia) Tina Križan (Slovenia) Katarina Srebotnik	7–5, 6–1
2003	(France) Émilie Loit (Sweden) Åsa Svensson	(Hungary) Petra Mandula (Austria) Patricia Wartusch	6–3, 6–1
2004	(Australia) Lisa McShea (Venezuela) Milagros Sequera	(Czech Republic) Olga Blahotová (Czech Republic) Gabriela Navrátilová	2–6, 7–6^{(7–5)}, 6–4
2005	(Russia) Alina Jidkova (Ukraine) Tatiana Perebiynis	(Spain) Rosa María Andrés Rodríguez (Spain) Conchita Martínez Granados	7–5, 6–3
2006	(Germany) Anna-Lena Grönefeld (United States) Meghann Shaughnessy	(Japan) Shinobu Asagoe (France) Émilie Loit	6–1, 6–3
2007	(Spain) Lourdes Domínguez Lino (Spain) Arantxa Parra Santonja	(France) Émilie Loit (Australia) Nicole Pratt	6–3, 6–3
2008	(Spain) Nuria Llagostera Vives (Spain) María José Martínez Sánchez (2)	(Czech Republic) Iveta Benešová (Czech Republic) Petra Cetkovská	6–2, 6–4
2009	(Spain) Nuria Llagostera Vives (2) (Spain) María José Martínez Sánchez (3)	(Spain) Lourdes Domínguez Lino (Spain) Arantxa Parra Santonja	6–4, 6–2
2010	(Slovenia) Polona Hercog (Czech Republic) Barbora Záhlavová-Strýcová	(Italy) Sara Errani (Italy) Roberta Vinci	2–6, 6–1, [10–2]
2011	(Ukraine) Mariya Koryttseva (Romania) Ioana Raluca Olaru	(Spain) Lourdes Domínguez Lino (Spain) Arantxa Parra Santonja	3–6, 6–1, [10–4]
2012	(Italy) Sara Errani (Italy) Roberta Vinci	(Spain) Lourdes Domínguez Lino (Spain) Arantxa Parra Santonja	6–2, 6–1
2013	(Spain) Lourdes Domínguez Lino (2) (Spain) Arantxa Parra Santonja (2)	(Colombia) Catalina Castaño (Colombia) Mariana Duque Mariño	6–4, 7–6^{(7–1)}
2014	(France) Kristina Mladenovic (Kazakhstan) Galina Voskoboeva	(Czech Republic) Petra Cetkovská (Czech Republic) Iveta Melzer	6–3, 2–6, [10–5]
2015	(Spain) Lara Arruabarrena (Spain) María Teresa Torró Flor	(Czech Republic) Andrea Hlaváčková (Czech Republic) Lucie Hradecká	7–6^{(7–2)}, 5–7, [13–11]
2016	(Spain) Anabel Medina Garrigues (2) (Spain) Arantxa Parra Santonja (3)	(Netherlands) Kiki Bertens (Sweden) Johanna Larsson	6–0, 6–4
2017	(Croatia) Darija Jurak (Australia) Anastasia Rodionova	(Colombia) Mariana Duque Mariño (Paraguay) Verónica Cepede Royg	6–3, 6–2
2018	(Germany) Tatjana Maria (United Kingdom) Heather Watson	(United States) Kaitlyn Christian (United States) Sabrina Santamaria	7–5, 2–6, [10–2]
2019	(Belarus) Victoria Azarenka (China) Zheng Saisai	(United States) Desirae Krawczyk (Mexico) Giuliana Olmos	6–1, 6–2
2020	(United States) Desirae Krawczyk (Mexico) Giuliana Olmos	(Ukraine) Kateryna Bondarenko (Canada) Sharon Fichman	6–3, 7–6^{(7–5)}

== ATP points and prize money ==
For the 2024 edition the distribution of points and prize money was as follows:

Singles

Round	ATP Points	Prize money
Winner	500	US$412,555
Finalist	330	US$221,975
Semifinalists	200	US$118,300
Quarter-finalists	100	US$60,440
Round of 16	50	US$32,265
Round of 32	0	US$17,210

== WTA points and prize money ==
For the 2020 edition the distribution of points and prize money was as follows:

Singles

Round	WTA Points	Prize money
Winner	280	US$43,000
Finalist	180	US$21,400
Semifinalists	110	US$11,500
Quarter-finalists	60	US$6,175
Round of 16	30	US$3,400
Round of 32	1	US$2,100

== Notes ==
Awards and achievements
Preceded by Dubai	ATP International Series Gold Tournament of the Year; 2007	Succeeded by Dubai
Preceded by Bali (Tier III – IV – V); Pattaya; Båstad	Favorite WTA International Tournament; 2009; 2011; 2013–2017	Succeeded by Pattaya; Båstad; Hong Kong
