= Hotel Princess Mundo Imperial =

Hotel in Mexico

Coordinates: 16.7884°N 99.8140°W

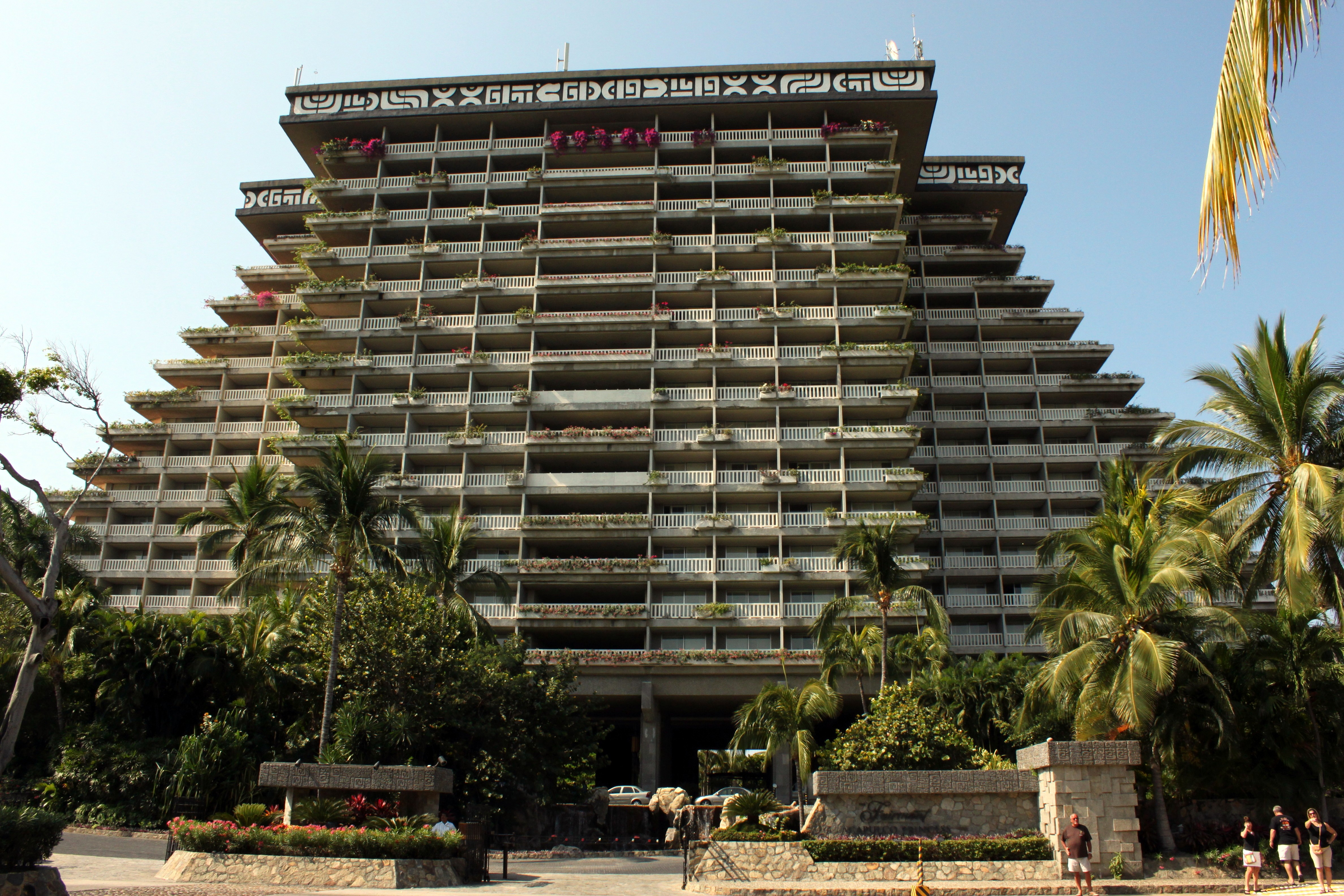
- Interactive map of the Hotel Princess Mundo Imperial area

General information
- Location: Acapulco, Guerrero, Mexico
- Opening: 1971
- Operator: Mundo Imperial

Design and construction
- Architect: William Rudolph

Other information
- Number of rooms: 1011

Website
- www.mundoimperial.com/princess/

Mexican Open (tennis)
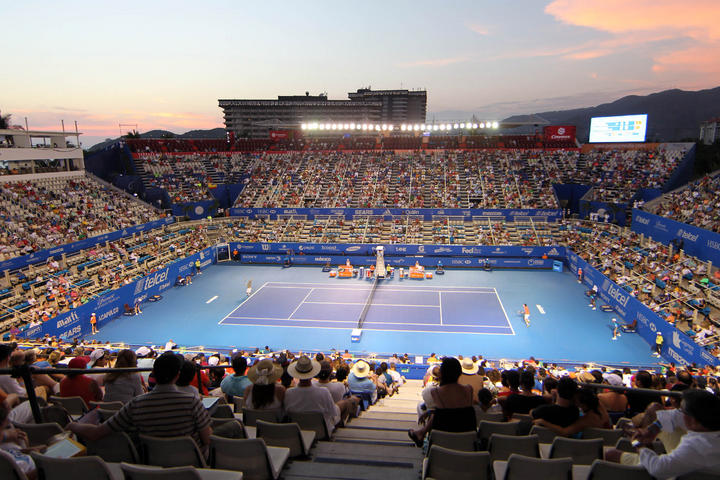
- Interactive map of Mexican Open (tennis)
- Location: Acapulco, Mexico
- Capacity: 5,000 (tennis)

Construction
- Built: 1991
- Opened: 1993

Tenants
- Mexican Open (tennis) (men's and women's) (Tennis) (1993–2021)

The Hotel Princess Mundo Imperial is a resort hotel located in Acapulco, Guerrero, Mexico. The hotel features eight tennis courts, including a 6,000-seat stadium court. It was the host of the Abierto Mexicano Telcel, an annual event on the ATP Tour and the WTA Tour.

== History and architecture ==
The Acapulco Princess was built by billionaire Daniel K. Ludwig and designed by William Rudolph and Leonides Guadarrama to resemble an ancient Aztec pyramid. It opened in 1971. In the summer of 1982 a third tower was added.

The Acapulco Princess was the final residence of Howard Hughes. On April 5, 1976, Hughes was carried out of his penthouse suite of the hotel, unconscious, and carried onto the chartered jet (N855W). He died shortly thereafter, en route to Houston, Texas.

In 1998, Canadian Pacific Hotels purchased the Princess Hotels situated in Mexico, Arizona, Bermuda and Barbados. In October 1999, CP purchased Fairmont Hotels, creating the company Fairmont Hotels & Resorts. The hotel was renamed the Fairmont Acapulco Princess. It remained part of the Fairmont chain until September 2015, when a legal dispute occurred between the owners, Grupo Autofin, and Fairmont Hotels. The hotel was renamed Hotel Princess Mundo Imperial. The resort suffered severe damage during Hurricane Otis on October 24, 2023.

== Facilities ==
Princess Mundo Imperial Hotel sits on over 480 acres (190 ha) of gardens with palms framing the view of the Sierra Madre in the Acapulco Diamante area. Built in the form of an ancient Aztec pyramid, the hotel contains 1,011 rooms.

The resort features four freshwater pools with waterfalls and one saltwater pool, all overlooking Revolcadero Beach; a golf course; and eight outdoor and two indoor tennis courts.

== See also ==
- List of hotels in Mexico
- List of companies of Mexico
- List of tennis stadiums by capacity
