= Lesia Tsurenko =

Ukrainian tennis player (born 1989)

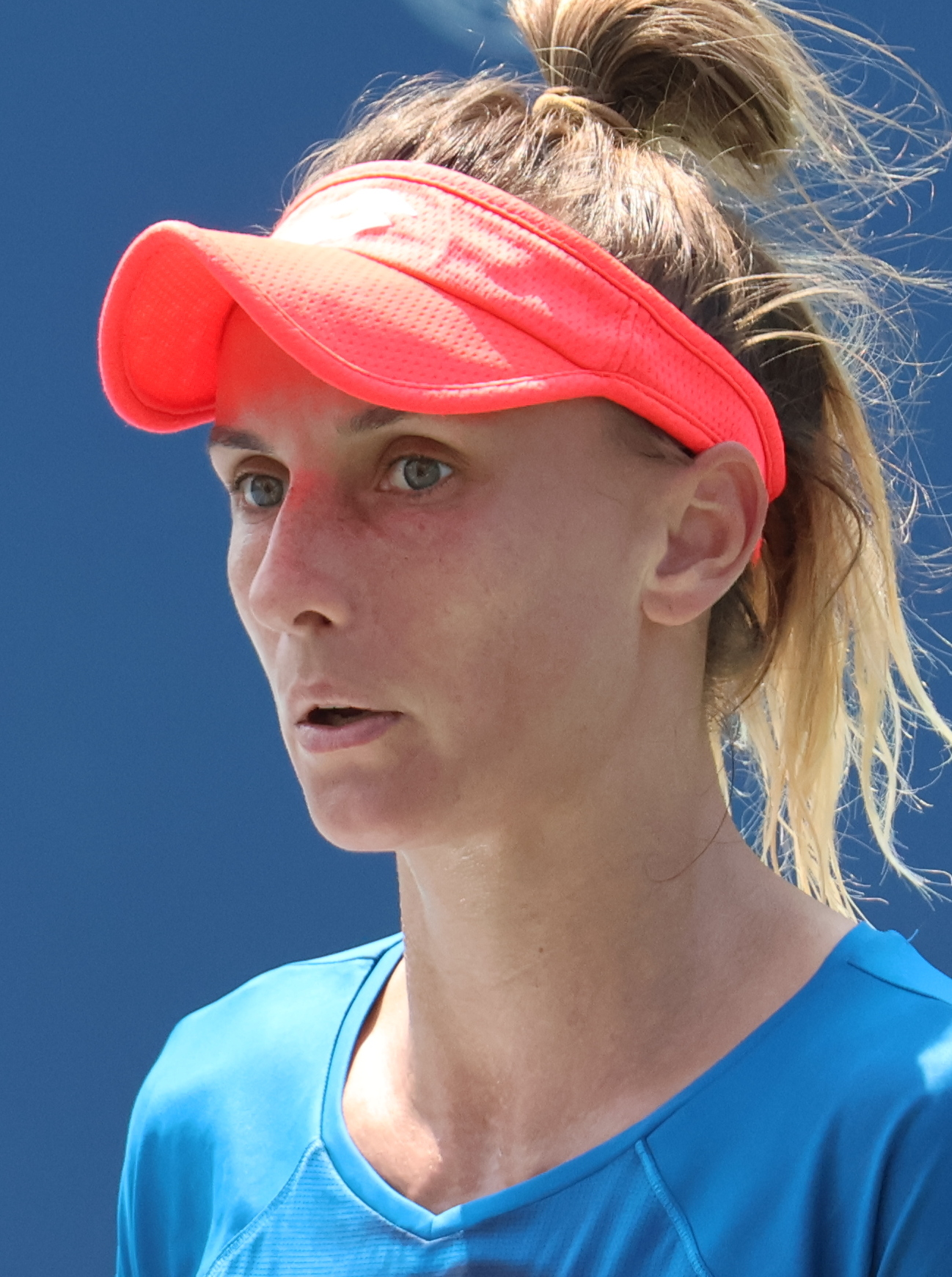
- Tsurenko at the 2024 Washington Open
- Full name: Lesia Viktorivna Tsurenko
- Country (sports): Ukraine
- Residence: Kyiv, Ukraine
- Born: 30 May 1989 (age 37) Volodymyrets, Ukrainian SSR, Soviet Union
- Height: 1.74 m (5 ft 9 in)
- Turned pro: 2007
- Retired: 2026
- Plays: Right-handed (two-handed backhand)
- Coach: Dmytro Brichek (2013–2018); Adriano Albanesi (2018–present); Mykyta Vlasov
- Prize money: $6,924,996

Singles
- Career record: 517–342
- Career titles: 4
- Highest ranking: No. 23 (18 February 2019)

Grand Slam singles results
- Australian Open: 3R (2013, 2024)
- French Open: 4R (2018, 2023)
- Wimbledon: 4R (2023)
- US Open: QF (2018)

Doubles
- Career record: 114–70
- Career titles: 0 WTA, 8 ITF
- Highest ranking: No. 115 (28 May 2018)

Grand Slam doubles results
- Australian Open: 1R (2014)
- French Open: 1R (2012, 2013, 2015, 2017, 2018)
- Wimbledon: 3R (2017)
- US Open: 2R (2015)

Team competitions
- Fed Cup: 17–17

Lesia Viktorivna Tsurenko (Ukrainian: Леся Вікторівна Цуренко; born 30 May 1989) is a Ukrainian former professional tennis player. Tsurenko has won four singles titles on the WTA Tour. On 18 February 2019, she reached her best singles ranking of world No. 23. On 28 May 2018, she peaked at No. 115 in the WTA doubles rankings.

== Career ==
=== 2013: Australian Open 3rd round & top 60 ===
In 2013, Tsurenko reached the semifinals of the WTA Premier Brisbane International tournament, after entering the draw as a lucky loser replacing Maria Sharapova; she defeated Jarmila Gajdošová and Daniela Hantuchová, before losing in three sets to Anastasia Pavlyuchenkova. Having qualified for the main draw of the Australian Open, she again faced Pavlyuchenkova, the 24th seed. This time, Tsurenko won in three sets. She then beat fellow qualifier Daria Gavrilova in the second round, (Note: To obtain data from this reference, select the corresponding year on the WTA or ITF website.) but lost to Caroline Wozniacki in the third. She continued her good run of form on the North American hardcourts, as she reached the third round at the Indian Wells Open as a qualifier; she defeated Ayumi Morita and Yaroslava Shvedova, before falling to Petra Kvitová. She reached a new career-high ranking of No. 60 in the world.

=== 2014: Loss of form ===
After nearly falling out of the world's top 200 prior to Wimbledon in 2014, Tsurenko experienced a mid-career revival. After qualifying for Wimbledon, she defeated Dinah Pfizenmaier to set up a second-round meeting with Simona Halep; Tsurenko pushed the No. 2 seed to three sets before losing out on a possible third-round appearance. She did, however, proceed to reach her first final on the ITF Circuit in nearly two years, losing the Vancouver Open final to Jarmila Wolfe, in three sets. She also reached the semifinals of the Tashkent Open, before losing to eventual champion Karin Knapp. Her late-season run ensured she'd finish inside the top 100 for the second year in a row.

=== 2015: First WTA Tour title ===
In 2015, Tsurenko reached the quarterfinals of the Indian Wells Open, again as a qualifier, defeating Annika Beck, Andrea Petkovic, Alizé Cornet and Eugenie Bouchard before retiring against Jelena Janković in the quarterfinals due to an ankle injury she suffered in defeating Bouchard. After again reaching the second round of Wimbledon and losing to Irina-Camelia Begu, Tsurenko won her first career singles title in Istanbul, defeating Urszula Radwańska in the final. As a result, she reached a new career-high ranking of world No. 47. She qualified for the Canadian Open in Toronto by beating Nicole Gibbs and Lara Arruabarrena, and then defeated Yanina Wickmayer, Wimbledon finalist Garbiñe Muguruza and Carina Witthöft, before succumbing to Sara Errani in the quarterfinals.

Her good form continued at the Connecticut Open. As a lucky loser, replacing Simona Halep, she defeated fifth seed Karolína Plíšková in the quarterfinals, in straight sets. In the semifinals, she eventually lost to French Open finalist, Lucie Šafářová. Tsurenko found revenge one week later at the US Open, defeating the sixth seed Šafářová in the first round. However, she lost to Varvara Lepchenko in round two. This performance allowed her to reach 33rd place in the world rankings at the end of the year.

=== 2016: First major fourth-round appearance ===
After a struggle in the first half of the year, Tsurenko made her first major fourth round at the US Open, after beating Irina-Camelia Begu and Dominika Cibulková, before losing to defending finalist, Roberta Vinci. Two weeks later, she won her second WTA Tour singles title in Guangzhou by defeating Jelena Janković in the final.

=== 2017: Third WTA Tour title & top 30 debut ===
Tsurenko won her third career singles title in Acapulco, defeating Kristina Mladenovic in the final. After Wimbledon, she reached a new career-high ranking of No. 29.

=== 2018: Fourth career title, first major QF ===
She defended her title in Acapulco to claim her fourth career singles title by defeating Stefanie Vögele in the final. In Cincinnati, she made her first Premier Mandatory quarterfinal appearance in three years, after beating Danielle Collins, Garbiñe Muguruza, and Ekaterina Makarova en route, before losing to Simona Halep.

At the US Open, she entered her first Grand Slam quarterfinal, after beating Alison Van Uytvanck, Caroline Wozniacki, Kateřina Siniaková, and Markéta Vondroušová, before losing to eventual champion Naomi Osaka. Tsurenko thus set a new career-high of No. 26 in singles.

=== 2019: WTA 500 final, top 25 debut ===
Beginning her 2019 year at the Brisbane International, she reached the final with wins over Mihaela Buzărnescu, Australian wildcard entrant Kimberly Birrell, Anett Kontaveit, and second seed Naomi Osaka. She lost in the championship match to fifth seed Karolína Plíšková. Seeded 24th at the Australian Open, Tsurenko was defeated in the second round by Amanda Anisimova.

In February at the Qatar Ladies Open, she lost in the second round to top seed and eventual finalist Simona Halep. At Dubai, she was defeated in the third round by third-seeded Simona Halep. Seeded 24th at the Indian Wells Open, Tsurenko made it to the third round where she lost to the ninth-seeded Aryna Sabalenka.

Tsurenko started her clay-court season in Germany, at the Porsche Tennis Grand Prix where she was defeated in the first round by German wildcard Laura Siegemund. At the Madrid Open, Tsurenko lost in round one to fourth seed Angelique Kerber. Playing at the Italian Open, she was defeated in the first round by Yulia Putintseva. Seeded 27th at the French Open, Tsurenko reached the third round in which she lost to third seed and defending champion, Simona Halep.

=== 2020–2021: Loss of form & out of top 100 ===
Tsurenko kicked off her 2020 season at the Shenzhen Open where she lost in the first round to third seed Elise Mertens. At the Australian Open, she was defeated in the first round by top seed Ashleigh Barty.

Seeded fourth at the first edition of the Zed Tennis Open, an ITF tournament in Cairo, Egypt, Tsurenko reached the final where she lost to third seed Irina-Camelia Begu. At the Qatar Ladies Open, she was defeated in the first round of qualifying by Greet Minnen. Playing at the Indian Wells Challenger, Tsurenko made it to the semifinals but lost to Begu who would end up winning the title. No tournaments were played from April to July 2020 due to the COVID-19 pandemic.

When play resumed in August, Tsurenko competed at the Prague Open. Coming through qualifying, she upset fifth seed Ekaterina Alexandrova in the first round. She then withdrew from her second-round match against Ana Bogdan.

Tsurenko started the 2021 season at the first edition of the Gippsland Trophy where she lost in the first round to Aliaksandra Sasnovich. At the 2021 Australian Open, she fell in the final round of qualifying to Liudmila Samsonova. Playing at the first edition of the Phillip Island Trophy, Tsurenko was defeated in the qualifying round by Mona Barthel. However, she was awarded a lucky loser spot into the main draw but was eliminated in the first round by Patricia Maria Țig. In Adelaide, she was beaten in the first round of qualifying by Australian Astra Sharma.

=== 2022: WTA 500 quarterfinal & Wimbledon 3rd round ===
Tsurenko lost 0–6, 1–6 to then-world number one and eventual champion, Ashleigh Barty, in the first round of the Australian Open. At the French Open, Tsurenko qualified into her second major main-draw debut but lost in her opener, where she was drawn to face current world No. 1, Iga Świątek.

During the grass-court season, Tsurenko achieved positive results. At Eastbourne, she reached the quarterfinals as a qualifier but withdrew before her match with Beatriz Haddad Maia. At Wimbledon, she reached the third round for a second time defeating compatriot Anhelina Kalinina.

At the Budapest Grand Prix, she reached the quarterfinals defeating Kamilla Rakhimova in 3 hours and 53 minutes, in the longest match of the season and seventh-longest match of the Open Era, but retired against third seed Yulia Putintseva.

=== 2023: First final since 2019, back to top 100, Wimbledon 4th round ===
She reached her first final since 2019 and sixth overall in Hua Hin, Thailand after the retirement of top seed Bianca Andreescu. She lost to Zhu Lin in the final. As a result, she returned to the top 100 on 6 February 2023.

At the Indian Wells Open, she qualified for the main draw and reached the third round, defeating Zhu Lin and 29th seed Donna Vekić, but withdrew from her match against Aryna Sabalenka citing personal reasons. She explained later that she had a panic attack after speaking with the WTA CEO. She lost by retirement or walkover in nine of her 18 tournaments dating back to Indian Wells from the previous year.

At the French Open, she reached the fourth round only for the second time at this major upsetting 13th seed Barbora Krejčíková. It was her 21st career victory over a player ranked inside the top 20, with six of those coming at major events. It was also her first top-20 win at a major since she beat then-No. 2 Caroline Wozniacki at the 2018 US Open in her run to the quarterfinals. Next she defeated Lauren Davis by retirement, and Bianca Andreescu.

At the Wimbledon Championships, she reached the fourth round for the first time at this major and the fifth overall. She prevailed over Ana Bogdan in a 3-hour 40 minutes match with a 38 points tiebreak in the third, the longest in women's Grand Slam tournament history in singles.

=== 2024-2026: Australian Open 3rd round, retirement ===
Tsurenko started the season at the Auckland Open where she beat Sachia Vickery in the first round in straight sets and lost in the second to Diane Parry in a three-setter. After that, she went to the Australian Open, in which she won against Lucia Bronzetti in the first round in another three-set match, Rebeka Masarova in the second in straight sets, but lost to second seed Aryna Sabalenka in the third round, in a hard-hitting straight-sets match.

Continuing her campaign on hardcourts, now in the Middle East, Tsurenko participated in the Abu Dhabi Open, where she lost to No. 8 seed, Liudmila Samsonova, in the first round in another hard-hitting two-setter.

Tsurenko announced her retirement from professional tennis in November 2026.

== Career statistics ==
=== Grand Slam performance timelines ===
Key
W	F	SF	QF	#R	RR	Q#	P#	DNQ	A	Z#	PO	G	S	B	NMS	NTI	P	NH

(W) winner; (F) finalist; (SF) semifinalist; (QF) quarterfinalist; (#R) rounds 4, 3, 2, 1; (RR) round-robin stage; (Q#) qualification round; (P#) preliminary round; (DNQ) did not qualify; (A) absent; (Z#) Davis/Fed Cup Zonal Group (with number indication) or (PO) play-off; (G) gold, (S) silver or (B) bronze Olympic/Paralympic medal; (NMS) not a Masters tournament; (NTI) not a Tier I tournament; (P) postponed; (NH) not held; (SR) strike rate (events won / competed); (W–L) win–loss record.
To avoid confusion and double counting, these charts are updated at the conclusion of a tournament or when the player's participation has ended.

==== Singles ====
Tournament	2009	2010	2011	2012	2013	2014	2015	2016	2017	2018	2019	2020	2021	2022	2023	2024	SR	W–L	Win %
Australian Open	A	A	2R	2R	3R	1R	1R	1R	1R	2R	2R	1R	Q3	1R	1R	3R	0 / 13	8–13	38%
French Open	A	Q2	Q1	1R	1R	Q2	1R	1R	3R	4R	3R	Q1	Q2	1R	4R	1R	0 / 10	10–10	50%
Wimbledon	A	Q1	1R	1R	2R	2R	2R	1R	3R	2R	1R	NH	A	3R	4R	1R	0 / 12	11–12	48%
US Open	A	Q1	Q1	1R	1R	1R	2R	4R	1R	QF	A	A	Q2	1R	2R	1R	0 / 10	9–10	47%
Win–loss	0–0	0–0	1–2	1–4	3–4	1–3	2–4	3–4	4–4	9–4	3–3	0–1	0–0	2–4	7–4	2–4	0 / 45	38–45	46%
Career statistics
Titles	0	0	0	0	0	0	1	1	1	1	0	0	0	0			Career total: 4		
Finals	0	0	0	0	0	0	1	1	1	1	1	0	0	0			Career total: 5		
Year-end ranking	265	184	120	102	70	96	33	58	42	27	70	146	119	130	31	118	$5,354,799		

Tsurenko qualified for the main draw of the 2021 Wimbledon Championships but withdrew before her first-round match. This is not counted as a loss.

==== Doubles ====
Tournament	2011	2012	2013	2014	2015	2016	2017	2018	2019	2020	W–L
Australian Open	A	A	A	1R	A	A	A	A	A	A	0–1
French Open	A	1R	1R	A	1R	A	1R	1R	A	A	0–5
Wimbledon	Q1	A	A	A	A	1R	3R	A	2R	A	3–3
US Open	A	A	A	A	2R	A	A	A	A	A	1–1
Win–loss	0–0	0–1	0–1	0–1	1–2	0–1	2–2	0–1	1–1	0–0	4–10
