= 2011 Abierto Mexicano Telcel – Women's singles =

Women's singles
- 2011 Abierto Mexicano Telcel

Final
- Champions: (Argentina) Gisela Dulko
- Runners-up: (Spain) Arantxa Parra Santonja
- Score: 6–3, 7–6^{(7–5)}

Details
- Draw: 32
- Seeds: 8

Events
Singles	men	women
Doubles	men	women
← 2010 ·	Abierto Mexicano Telcel	· 2012 →

This article presents the results of the 2011 Abierto Mexicano Telcel – Women's Singles of the international game of tennis.

Gisela Dulko won, defeating Arantxa Parra Santonja in the final, 6–3, 7–6^{(7–5)}.

Venus Williams was the defending champion but chose not to participate that year.

== Seeds ==
1. (Germany) Julia Görges (second round)
2. (Slovenia) Polona Hercog (first round)
3. (Hungary) Gréta Arn (quarterfinals)
4. (Argentina) Gisela Dulko (champion)
5. (Romania) Simona Halep (first round)
6. (Spain) Arantxa Parra Santonja (final)
7. (Spain) Carla Suárez Navarro (quarterfinals, retired)
8. (Belarus) Olga Govortsova (first round)

== Main draw ==
=== Key ===
- Q = Qualifier
- WC = Wild card
- LL = Lucky loser
- Alt = Alternate
- SE = Special exempt
- PR = Protected ranking
- ITF = ITF entry
- JE = Junior exempt
- w/o = Walkover
- r = Retired
- d = Defaulted
- SR = Special ranking

=== Finals ===
Semifinals
(Spain) Anabel Medina Garrigues	0	2
4	(Argentina) Gisela Dulko	6	6
(Sweden) Johanna Larsson	2	0
6	(Spain) Arantxa Parra Santonja	6	6

Final
4	(Argentina) Gisela Dulko	6	7
6	(Spain) Arantxa Parra Santonja	3	6^{5}

=== Top half ===
First round
1	(Germany) J Görges	6	6
WC	(Mexico) X Hermoso	1	2
(Spain) A Medina Garrigues	6	6
WC	(Czech Republic) Ka Plíšková	2	1
WC	(Czech Republic) Kr Plíšková	4	1
Q	(Romania) M Gojnea	6	6
(Czech Republic) S Záhlavová	4	1
7	(Spain) C Suárez Navarro	6	6
4	(Argentina) G Dulko	6	6
Q	(Georgia (country)) A Tatishvili	3	1
(United States) J Craybas	1	1
Q	(Spain) S Soler Espinosa	6	6
(Romania) S Cîrstea	6	6
(Austria) P Mayr-Achleitner	2	4
(Spain) L Pous Tió	6	6^{4}	6
5	(Romania) S Halep	3	7	3

Second round
1	(Germany) J Görges	4	6^{6}
(Spain) A Medina Garrigues	6	7
Q	(Romania) M Gojnea	4	3
7	(Spain) C Suárez Navarro	6	6
4	(Argentina) G Dulko	6	6
Q	(Spain) S Soler Espinosa	1	1
(Romania) S Cîrstea	2	1
(Spain) L Pous Tió	6	6

Quarterfinals
(Spain) A Medina Garrigues	6	2
7	(Spain) C Suárez Navarro	2	2	r
4	(Argentina) G Dulko	3	7	6
(Spain) L Pous Tió	6	5	0

Semifinals
(Spain) A Medina Garrigues	0	2
4	(Argentina) G Dulko	6	6

=== Bottom half ===
First round
8	(Belarus) O Govortsova	2	6^{4}
(France) M Johansson	6	7
(Austria) Y Meusburger	1	6	0
(Sweden) J Larsson	6	3	6
(Italy) R Oprandi	4	6	4
(Czech Republic) R Voráčová	6	4	6
(Romania) E Gallovits-Hall	4	4
3	(Hungary) G Arn	6	6
6	(Spain) A Parra Santonja	7	7
(Austria) S Bammer	6^{3}	6^{4}
(United States) M Oudin	1	2	r
Q	(Ukraine) L Tsurenko	6	3
(Czech Republic) Z Ondrášková	3	5
(France) P Parmentier	6	7
(Spain) L Domínguez Lino	6	4	6
2	(Slovenia) P Hercog	3	6	3

Second round
(France) M Johansson	6	2	3
(Sweden) J Larsson	2	6	6
(Czech Republic) R Voráčová	3	6	4
3	(Hungary) G Arn	6	2	6
6	(Spain) A Parra Santonja	6	1
Q	(Ukraine) L Tsurenko	3	0	r
(France) P Parmentier	1	1
(Spain) L Domínguez Lino	6	6

Quarterfinals
(Sweden) J Larsson	6	4	6
3	(Hungary) G Arn	1	6	2
6	(Spain) A Parra Santonja	2	6	6
(Spain) L Domínguez Lino	6	3	2

Semifinals
(Sweden) J Larsson	2	0
6	(Spain) A Parra Santonja	6	6
