= 2010 Abierto Mexicano Telcel – Men's doubles =

Men's doubles
- 2010 Abierto Mexicano Telcel

Final
- Champions: (Poland) Łukasz Kubot (Austria) Oliver Marach
- Runners-up: (Italy) Fabio Fognini (Italy) Potito Starace
- Score: 6–0, 6–0

Events
Singles	men	women
Doubles	men	women
← 2009 ·	Abierto Mexicano Telcel	· 2011 →

František Čermák and Michal Mertiňák were the defending champions, but chose not to participate that year, competing in Dubai instead.

Łukasz Kubot and Oliver Marach won in the final 6–0, 6–0, against Fabio Fognini and Potito Starace.

== Seeds ==
1. (Poland) Łukasz Kubot / (Austria) Oliver Marach (champions)
2. (Brazil) Marcelo Melo / (Brazil) Bruno Soares (quarterfinals)
3. (Czech Republic) Martin Damm / (Slovakia) Filip Polášek (semifinals)
4. (Sweden) Johan Brunström / (Netherlands Antilles) Jean-Julien Rojer (first round)

== Draw ==
=== Key ===
- Q = Qualifier
- WC = Wild card
- LL = Lucky loser
- Alt = Alternate
- SE = Special exempt
- PR = Protected ranking
- ITF = ITF entry
- JE = Junior exempt
- w/o = Walkover
- r = Retired
- d = Defaulted
- SR = Special ranking

=== Draw ===
First round
1	(Poland) Ł Kubot (Austria) O Marach	6	6
(Russia) I Andreev (Spain) D Gimeno-Traver	2	4
(Uruguay) P Cuevas (Chile) F González	7^{7}	6
(Romania) V Hănescu (Israel) D Sela	6^{3}	2
3	(Czech Republic) M Damm (Slovakia) F Polášek	6	6
(Australia) S Huss (Czech Republic) J Levinský	3	2
(Argentina) L Arnold Ker (Brazil) T Bellucci	6^{5}	6	[8]
WC	(Mexico) J-M Elizondo (Mexico) C Ramírez	7^{7}	4	[10]
(Spain) Ó Hernández (Spain) A Montañés	2	5
(Argentina) J Mónaco (Argentina) H Zeballos	6	7
WC	(Mexico) S González (Chile) N Massú	6	6^{2}	[11]
4	(Sweden) J Brunström (Netherlands Antilles) J-J Rojer	2	7^{7}	[9]
ALT	(Italy) F Fognini (Italy) P Starace	6	6
(United States) J Isner (United States) S Querrey	3	4
(Israel) J Erlich (Israel) A Ram	2	4
2	(Brazil) M Melo (Brazil) B Soares	6	6

Quarterfinals
1	(Poland) Ł Kubot (Austria) O Marach	6	6
(Uruguay) P Cuevas (Chile) F González	4	2
3	(Czech Republic) M Damm (Slovakia) F Polášek	6	6
WC	(Mexico) J-M Elizondo (Mexico) C Ramírez	3	2
(Argentina) J Mónaco (Argentina) H Zeballos	7	6
WC	(Mexico) S González (Chile) N Massú	5	1
ALT	(Italy) F Fognini (Italy) P Starace	6	3	[10]
2	(Brazil) M Melo (Brazil) B Soares	2	6	[7]

Semifinals
1	(Poland) Ł Kubot (Austria) O Marach	7	6
3	(Czech Republic) M Damm (Slovakia) F Polášek	5	4
(Argentina) J Mónaco (Argentina) H Zeballos
ALT	(Italy) F Fognini (Italy) P Starace	w/o

Final
1	(Poland) Ł Kubot (Austria) O Marach	6	6
ALT	(Italy) F Fognini (Italy) P Starace	0	0
