= 2011 Abierto Mexicano Telcel – Women's doubles =

Women's doubles
- 2011 Abierto Mexicano Telcel

Final
- Champions: (Ukraine) Mariya Koryttseva (Romania) Ioana Raluca Olaru
- Runners-up: (Spain) Lourdes Domínguez Lino (Spain) Arantxa Parra Santonja
- Score: 3–6, 6–1, [10–4]

Events
Singles	men	women
Doubles	men	women
← 2010 ·	Abierto Mexicano Telcel	· 2012 →

Polona Hercog and Barbora Záhlavová-Strýcová were the defending champions, but Záhlavová-Strýcová chose not to compete this year.
As a result, Hercog partnered up with Petra Martić. However, they lost in quarterfinals to Petra Cetkovská and Renata Voráčová.
Mariya Koryttseva and Ioana Raluca Olaru defeated Lourdes Domínguez Lino and Arantxa Parra Santonja in the final, 3–6, 6–1, [10–4]

== Seeds ==
1. (United States) Jill Craybas / (Romania) Edina Gallovits-Hall (first round)
2. (Slovenia) Polona Hercog / (Croatia) Petra Martić (quarterfinals)
3. (Germany) Anna-Lena Grönefeld / (Turkey) İpek Şenoğlu (quarterfinals)
4. (Greece) Eleni Daniilidou / (Germany) Jasmin Wöhr (first round)

== Main draw ==
=== Key ===
- Q = Qualifier
- WC = Wild card
- LL = Lucky loser
- Alt = Alternate
- SE = Special exempt
- PR = Protected ranking
- ITF = ITF entry
- JE = Junior exempt
- w/o = Walkover
- r = Retired
- d = Defaulted
- SR = Special ranking

== Draw ==
First round
1	(United States) J Craybas (Romania) E Gallovits-Hall	3	6	[6]
(Sweden) J Larsson (Austria) Y Meusburger	6	3	[10]
WC	(Mexico) X Hermoso (Argentina) M Irigoyen	3	3
(Spain) L Domínguez Lino (Spain) A Parra Santonja	6	6
4	(Greece) E Daniilidou (Germany) J Wöhr	2	0
(Romania) S Cîrstea (Slovenia) A Klepač	6	6
(Romania) I-C Begu (Russia) A Panova	w/o
(Belarus) O Govortsova (United States) M Oudin
(Ukraine) M Koryttseva (Romania) IR Olaru	7	5	[12]
(Russia) A Rodionova (Ukraine) O Savchuk	6^{1}	7	[10]
(France) S Foretz Gacon (France) A Védy	4	5
3	(Germany) A-L Grönefeld (Turkey) İ Şenoğlu	6	7
(United Kingdom) S Borwell (Canada) M-È Pelletier	2	1
(Czech Republic) P Cetkovská (Czech Republic) R Voráčová	6	6
WC	(Mexico) C Betancourt (Mexico) G Manifacio	1	1
2	(Slovenia) P Hercog (Croatia) P Martić	6	6

Quarterfinals
(Sweden) J Larsson (Austria) Y Meusburger	7	3	[7]
(Spain) L Domínguez Lino (Spain) A Parra Santonja	6^{6}	6	[10]
(Romania) S Cîrstea (Slovenia) A Klepač	4	6	[7]
(Romania) I-C Begu (Russia) A Panova	6	3	[10]
(Ukraine) M Koryttseva (Romania) IR Olaru	6	5	[10]
3	(Germany) A-L Grönefeld (Turkey) İ Şenoğlu	3	7	[7]
(Czech Republic) P Cetkovská (Czech Republic) R Voráčová	6	1	[10]
2	(Slovenia) P Hercog (Croatia) P Martić	3	6	[6]

Semifinals
(Spain) L Domínguez Lino (Spain) A Parra Santonja	6	6^{6}	[10]
(Romania) I-C Begu (Russia) A Panova	1	7	[3]
(Ukraine) M Koryttseva (Romania) IR Olaru	6	1	[10]
(Czech Republic) P Cetkovská (Czech Republic) R Voráčová	4	6	[7]

Finals
(Spain) L Domínguez Lino (Spain) A Parra Santonja	6	1	[4]
(Ukraine) M Koryttseva (Romania) IR Olaru	3	6	[10]
