= 2011 Abierto Mexicano Telcel – Men's singles qualifying =

This article displays the qualifying draw of the 2011 Abierto Mexicano Telcel.

== Players ==
=== Seeds ===
1. (Portugal) Rui Machado (first round)
2. (Portugal) Frederico Gil (qualifying competition, lucky loser)
3. (Argentina) Horacio Zeballos (qualifying competition, lucky loser)
4. (Spain) Albert Ramos-Viñolas (qualified)
5. (Argentina) Máximo González (qualified)
6. (Spain) Daniel Muñoz-de la Nava (qualifying competition, lucky loser)
7. (Argentina) Diego Junqueira (first round)
8. (Chile) Paul Capdeville (qualified)

=== Qualifiers ===
1. (Romania) Adrian Ungur
2. (Chile) Paul Capdeville
3. (Argentina) Máximo González
4. (Spain) Albert Ramos-Viñolas

=== Lucky losers ===
1. (Portugal) Frederico Gil
2. (Argentina) Horacio Zeballos
3. (Spain) Daniel Muñoz-de la Nava
4. (Spain) Iván Navarro

== Qualifying draw ==
=== First qualifier ===
First round
1	(Portugal) Rui Machado	4	2^{r}
(Spain) Iván Navarro	6	3
(Romania) Adrian Ungur	6	7
7	(Argentina) Diego Junqueira	3	5

Qualifying competition
(Spain) Iván Navarro	2	6	1
(Romania) Adrian Ungur	6	2	6

=== Second qualifier ===
First round
2	(Portugal) Frederico Gil	2	6	6
(Australia) Peter Luczak	6	2	4
Alt	(Canada) Pierre-Ludovic Duclos	5	4
8	(Chile) Paul Capdeville	7	6

Qualifying competition
2	(Portugal) Frederico Gil	6	0	6^{6}
8	(Chile) Paul Capdeville	2	6	7

=== Third qualifier ===
First round
3	(Argentina) Horacio Zeballos	6	6
WC	(Mexico) Antonio Ruíz-Rosales	2	4
WC	(Mexico) Alexis Carlos	3	2
5	(Argentina) Máximo González	6	6

Qualifying competition
3	(Argentina) Horacio Zeballos	3	1
5	(Argentina) Máximo González	6	6

=== Fourth qualifier ===
First round
4	(Spain) Albert Ramos-Viñolas	6	6
(Mexico) Luis Díaz-Barriga	4	4
WC	(Mexico) Luis Patiño	2	1
6	(Spain) Daniel Muñoz-de la Nava	6	6

Qualifying competition
4	(Spain) Albert Ramos-Viñolas	7	6
6	(Spain) Daniel Muñoz-de la Nava	5	2
