= 2010 Abierto Mexicano Telcel =

- Date: 22–27 February
- Edition: 17th (men) / 10th (women)
- Category: ATP World Tour 500 (ATP); WTA International tournaments (WTA)
- Surface: Clay / outdoor
- Location: Acapulco, Mexico

Champions

Men's singles
- (Spain) David Ferrer

Women's singles
- (United States) Venus Williams

Men's doubles
- (Poland) Łukasz Kubot / (Austria) Oliver Marach

Women's doubles
- (Slovenia) Polona Hercog / (Czech Republic) Barbora Záhlavová-Strýcová
← 2009 ·	Mexican Open	· 2011 →

The 2010 Abierto Mexicano Telcel was a tennis tournament played on outdoor clay courts. It was the 17th edition of the men's tournament (10th for the women) of the Abierto Mexicano Telcel, and was part of the 500 series of the 2010 ATP World Tour, and was in the International category of tournaments on the 2010 WTA Tour. Both the men's and the women's events took place at the Fairmont Acapulco Princess in Acapulco, Mexico, from February 22 through February 27, 2010.

The men's singles draw included two-time defending champion Nicolás Almagro, Fernando Verdasco - the 2010 SAP Open champion; Juan Carlos Ferrero - the 2010 Brasil Open champion; Fernando González, a semifinalist in the 2010 Movistar Open; the 2010 Movistar Open finalists Thomaz Bellucci and Juan Mónaco; the 2010 Heineken Open champion John Isner and 2010 Medibank International Sydney runner-up Richard Gasquet.

The women's singles draw included the defending champion and seven-time Grand Slam champion Venus Williams, 2010 Open GDF Suez semifinalist Melanie Oudin, Gisela Dulko, Carla Suárez Navarro and Alizé Cornet.

== Finals ==
=== Men's singles ===
(Spain) David Ferrer defeated (Spain) Juan Carlos Ferrero, 6–3, 3–6, 6–1

- It was Ferrer's first title of the year and eighth of his career.

=== Women's singles ===
(United States) Venus Williams defeated (Slovenia) Polona Hercog, 2–6, 6–2, 6–3

- It was Williams' second title of the year and 43rd of her career. It was her second win at the event, defending her title from 2009.

=== Men's doubles ===
(Poland) Łukasz Kubot / (Austria) Oliver Marach defeated (Italy) Fabio Fognini / (Italy) Potito Starace, 6–0, 6–0

=== Women's doubles ===
(Slovenia) Polona Hercog / (Czech Republic) Barbora Záhlavová-Strýcová defeated (Italy) Sara Errani / (Italy) Roberta Vinci, 2–6, 6–1, [10–2]

== ATP entrants ==
=== Seeds ===
Athlete	Nationality	Ranking*	Seeding
Fernando Verdasco	Spain	11	1
Fernando González	Chile	12	2
David Ferrer	Spain	19	3
Juan Carlos Ferrero	Spain	22	4
John Isner	United States	25	5
Nicolás Almagro	Spain	26	6
Juan Mónaco	Argentina	27	7
Albert Montañés	Spain	30	8

- Rankings as of February 15, 2010.

=== Other entrants ===
The following players received wildcards into the main draw:

- (Mexico) Santiago González
- (Spain) Carlos Moyá
- (Spain) Fernando Verdasco

The following players received entry from the qualifying draw:

- (Romania) Victor Crivoi
- (Argentina) Diego Junqueira
- (Spain) Alberto Martín
- (Argentina) Eduardo Schwank

== WTA entrants ==
=== Seeds ===
Athlete	Nationality	Ranking*	Seeding
Venus Williams	United States	5	1
Ágnes Szávay	Hungary	32	2
Gisela Dulko	Argentina	35	3
Sorana Cîrstea	Romania	40	4
Carla Suárez Navarro	Spain	46	5
Sara Errani	Italy	49	6
Roberta Vinci	Italy	57	7
Polona Hercog	Slovenia	59	8

- Rankings as of February 15, 2010.

=== Other entrants ===
The following players received wildcards into the main draw:

- (Romania) Sorana Cîrstea
- (Kazakhstan) Zarina Diyas
- (Mexico) Alejandra Granillo

The following players received entry from the qualifying draw:

- (Hungary) Gréta Arn
- (Colombia) Catalina Castaño
- (Czech Republic) Lucie Hradecká
- (Spain) Laura Pous Tió
