= 2012 Swedish Open =

- Date: 7–15 July (men); 14–22 July (women)
- Edition: 65th (men); 4th (women)
- Surface: Clay / outdoor
- Location: Båstad, Sweden

Champions

Men's singles
- (Spain) David Ferrer

Women's singles
- (Slovenia) Polona Hercog

Men's doubles
- (Sweden) Robert Lindstedt / (Romania) Horia Tecău

Women's doubles
- (Colombia) Catalina Castaño / (Colombia) Mariana Duque Mariño
- Swedish Open

The 2012 Swedish Open was a tennis tournament played on outdoor clay courts as part of the ATP World Tour 250 Series of the 2012 ATP World Tour and as part of the International Series on the 2012 WTA Tour. It took place in Båstad, Sweden, from 7 July until 15 July 2012 for the Men's tournament and from 14 July until 22 July 2012 for the Women's tournament. It was also known as the 2012 SkiStar Swedish Open for the men's and the 2012 Sony Swedish Open for the women's for sponsorship reasons. It was the 65th edition for the men's and the 4th edition for the women's. David Ferrer and Polona Hercog won the singles titles.

== Finals ==
=== Men's singles ===
(Spain) David Ferrer defeated (Spain) Nicolás Almagro, 6–2, 6–2

=== Women's singles ===
(Slovenia) Polona Hercog defeated (France) Mathilde Johansson, 0–6, 6–4, 7–5

=== Men's doubles ===
(Sweden) Robert Lindstedt / (Romania) Horia Tecău defeated (Austria) Alexander Peya / (Brazil) Bruno Soares 6–3, 7–6^{(7–5)}

=== Women's doubles ===
(Colombia) Catalina Castaño / (Colombia) Mariana Duque Mariño defeated (Czech Republic) Eva Hrdinová / (Bosnia and Herzegovina) Mervana Jugić-Salkić, 4–6, 7–5, [10–5]

== ATP singles main draw entrants ==
=== Seeds ===
Country	Player	Rank^{1}	Seed
ESP	David Ferrer	5	1
ESP	Nicolás Almagro	11	2
ESP	Albert Ramos	43	3
FIN	Jarkko Nieminen	44	4
KAZ	Mikhail Kukushkin	52	5
BUL	Grigor Dimitrov	69	6
ITA	Filippo Volandri	79	7
ROU	Adrian Ungur	81	8

- ^{1} Seedings are based on the rankings of June 25, 2012

=== Other entrants ===
The following players received wildcards into the singles main draw:

- (Sweden) Christian Lindell
- (Sweden) Michael Ryderstedt
- (Spain) Tommy Robredo

The following players received entry from the qualifying draw:

- (Brazil) Thiago Alves
- (Italy) Alessandro Giannessi
- (Kazakhstan) Evgeny Korolev
- (Czech Republic) Ivo Minář

=== Withdrawals ===
- (Czech Republic) Tomáš Berdych → replaced by (Brazil) Rogério Dutra Silva
- (France) Paul-Henri Mathieu → replaced by (Spain) Daniel Gimeno Traver
- (France) Gaël Monfils → replaced by (Brazil) João Souza

== ATP doubles main draw entrants ==
=== Seeds ===
Country	Player	Country	Player	Rank^{1}	Seed
SWE	Robert Lindstedt	ROU	Horia Tecău	21	1
AUT	Alexander Peya	BRA	Bruno Soares	51	2
AUS	Paul Hanley	AUT	Julian Knowle	86	3
SWE	Johan Brunström	BEL	Dick Norman	115	4

- Rankings are as of June 25, 2012

=== Other entrants ===
The following pairs received wildcards into the doubles main draw:

- (Sweden) Filip Bergevi / (Sweden) Fred Simonsson
- (Sweden) Patrik Rosenholm / (Sweden) Michael Ryderstedt

The following pair received entry as alternates:

- (Spain) Roberto Bautista-Agut / (Estonia) Jürgen Zopp

== WTA singles main draw entrants ==
=== Seeds ===
Country	Player	Rank^{1}	Seed
~~ITA~~	~~Sara Errani~~	~~9~~	~~1~~
GER	Julia Görges	24	2
ESP	Anabel Medina Garrigues	26	3
ITA	Roberta Vinci	27	4
RUS	Anastasia Pavlyuchenkova	29	5
CZE	Klára Zakopalová	32	6
GER	Mona Barthel	40	7
ESP	Carla Suárez Navarro	41	8

- ^{1} Rankings are as of July 9, 2012

=== Other entrants ===
The following players received wildcards into the singles main draw:

- (Sweden) Rebecca Peterson
- (United Kingdom) Laura Robson
- (Sweden) Sandra Roma

The following players received entry from the qualifying draw:

- (Germany) Annika Beck
- (Spain) Lourdes Domínguez Lino
- (Colombia) Mariana Duque Mariño
- (Germany) Carina Witthöft

The following players received entry as Lucky Loser:

- (United States) Jill Craybas

=== Withdrawals ===
- (Italy) Sara Errani (shoulder injury)
- (Estonia) Kaia Kanepi (heels)

== WTA doubles main draw entrants ==
=== Seeds ===
Country	Player	Country	Player	Rank^{1}	Seed
GER	Julia Görges	RUS	Anastasia Pavlyuchenkova	84	1
BLR	Olga Govortsova	POL	Klaudia Jans-Ignacik	92	2
CRO	Darija Jurak	HUN	Katalin Marosi	149	3
ESP	Lourdes Domínguez Lino	ESP	Anabel Medina Garrigues	154	4

- ^{1} Rankings are as of July 9, 2012

=== Other entrants ===
The following pairs received wildcards into the doubles main draw:

- (Sweden) Beatrice Cedermark / (Sweden) Rebecca Peterson
- (Sweden) Hilda Melander / (Sweden) Sandra Roma

=== Retirements ===
- (Spain) Lourdes Domínguez Lino (thigh muscle strain)
- (Germany) Julia Görges (foot injury)
- (Belarus) Olga Govortsova (viral illness)
