= 2010 Abierto Mexicano Telcel – Women's doubles =

Women's doubles
- 2010 Abierto Mexicano Telcel

Final
- Champions: (Slovenia) Polona Hercog (Czech Republic) Barbora Záhlavová-Strýcová
- Runners-up: (Italy) Sara Errani (Italy) Roberta Vinci
- Score: 2–6, 6–1, [10–2]

Events
| Singles | men | women |
| Doubles | men | women |
| ← 2009 · | Abierto Mexicano Telcel | · 2011 → |

Nuria Llagostera Vives and María José Martínez Sánchez were the defending champions, but they chose to not participate this year.
Polona Hercog and Barbora Záhlavová-Strýcová won in the final 2–6, 6–1, [10–2] against Sara Errani and Roberta Vinci.

== Seeds ==
1. (Czech Republic) Andrea Hlaváčková / (Czech Republic) Lucie Hradecká (semifinals)
2. (Czech Republic) Vladimíra Uhlířová / (Czech Republic) Renata Voráčová (semifinals)
3. (Argentina) Gisela Dulko / (Hungary) Ágnes Szávay (first round)
4. (Slovenia) Polona Hercog / (Czech Republic) Barbora Záhlavová-Strýcová (champions)

== Draw ==
=== Key ===
- Q = Qualifier
- WC = Wild card
- LL = Lucky loser
- Alt = Alternate
- SE = Special exempt
- PR = Protected ranking
- ITF = ITF entry
- JE = Junior exempt
- w/o = Walkover
- r = Retired
- d = Defaulted
- SR = Special ranking

=== Draws ===
First round
1 | (Czech Republic) A Hlaváčková (Czech Republic) L Hradecká | 6 | 4 | [10]
(Spain) L Domínguez Lino (Spain) A Parra Santonja | 2 | 6 | [7]
WC | (Mexico) X Hermoso (Mexico) D Múñoz Gallegos | 1 | 0
WC | (Romania) S Cîrstea (France) A Cornet | 6 | 6
3 | (Argentina) G Dulko (Hungary) Á Szávay | 3 | 3
(Italy) S Errani (Italy) R Vinci | 6 | 6
(United States) B Mattek-Sands (United States) M Shaughnessy | 6 | 6
(Russia) M Kondratieva (France) S Lefèvre | 2 | 1
(United States) L Osterloh (Georgia (country)) A Tatishvili | 1 | 6 | [12]
(Ukraine) O Savchuk (Germany) K Wörle | 6 | 0 | [10]
(France) M Johansson (France) A Védy | 5 | 1
4 | (Slovenia) P Hercog (Czech Republic) B Záhlavová-Strýcová | 7 | 6
(Canada) S Fichman (United States) M Washington | w/o
(Romania) E Gallovits (Ukraine) M Koryttseva
(United States) J Craybas (Canada) M-È Pelletier | 6^{8} | 6 | [6]
2 | (Czech Republic) V Uhlířová (Czech Republic) R Voráčová | 7 | 2 | [10]

Quarterfinals
1 | (Czech Republic) A Hlaváčková (Czech Republic) L Hradecká | 5 | 7 | [10]
WC | (Romania) S Cîrstea (France) A Cornet | 7 | 5 | [6]
(Italy) S Errani (Italy) R Vinci | 6 | 4 | [10]
(United States) B Mattek-Sands (United States) M Shaughnessy | 3 | 6 | [8]
(United States) L Osterloh (Georgia (country)) A Tatishvili | 5 | 2
4 | (Slovenia) P Hercog (Czech Republic) B Záhlavová-Strýcová | 7 | 6
(Canada) S Fichman (United States) M Washington | 5 | 1
2 | (Czech Republic) V Uhlířová (Czech Republic) R Voráčová | 7 | 6

Semifinals
1 | (Czech Republic) A Hlaváčková (Czech Republic) L Hradecká | 7 | 6^{4} | [8]
(Italy) S Errani (Italy) R Vinci | 6^{6} | 7 | [10]
4 | (Slovenia) P Hercog (Czech Republic) B Záhlavová-Strýcová | 6 | 6
2 | (Czech Republic) V Uhlířová (Czech Republic) R Voráčová | 2 | 4

Finals
(Italy) S Errani (Italy) R Vinci | 6 | 1 | [2]
4 | (Slovenia) P Hercog (Czech Republic) B Záhlavová-Strýcová | 2 | 6 | [10]
