= 2012 Swedish Open – Men's doubles =

Men's doubles
- 2012 Swedish Open

Final
- Champions: (Sweden) Robert Lindstedt (Romania) Horia Tecău
- Runners-up: (Austria) Alexander Peya (Brazil) Bruno Soares
- Score: 6–3, 7–6^{(7–5)}

Details
- Draw: 16
- Seeds: 4

Events
Singles	men	women
Doubles	men	women
- Swedish Open

Robert Lindstedt and Horia Tecău successfully defended their title by beating Alexander Peya and Bruno Soares 6–3, 7–6 in the final.

== Seeds ==
1. (Sweden) Robert Lindstedt / (Romania) Horia Tecău (champions)
2. (Austria) Alexander Peya / (Brazil) Bruno Soares (final)
3. (Australia) Paul Hanley / (Austria) Julian Knowle (semifinals)
4. (Sweden) Johan Brunström / (Belgium) Dick Norman (first round)

== Draw ==
Key

- Q = Qualifier
- WC = Wild card
- LL = Lucky loser
- Alt = Alternate
- ITF = ITF entry
- PR = Protected ranking
- SR = Special ranking
- SE = Special exempt
- JE = Junior exempt
- JR = Junior Accelerator Programme entrant
- CO = College Accelerator Programme entrant
- NG = Next Gen Accelerator Program entrant
- w/o = Walkover
- r = Retired
- d = Defaulted

=== Draw ===
First round
1	(Sweden) R Lindstedt (Romania) H Tecău	6	6
(Finland) H Heliövaara (Finland) J Nieminen	4	4
(Portugal) F Gil (Spain) D Gimeno Traver	2	1
(Australia) C Ebelthite (United Kingdom) J Murray	6	6
3	(Australia) P Hanley (Austria) J Knowle	6	6
(France) O Charroin (Ukraine) D Molchanov	2	0
(Brazil) J Souza (Argentina) H Zeballos	6	6
(Italy) S Bolelli (Italy) A Giannessi	4	3
(Romania) A Ungur (Italy) F Volandri	7^{9}	6
Alt	(Spain) R Bautista Agut (Estonia) J Zopp	6^{7}	3
(Argentina) F Delbonis (Spain) A Ramos	6	3	[10]
4	(Sweden) J Brunström (Belgium) D Norman	4	6	[4]
(Russia) M Elgin (Kazakhstan) M Kukushkin	6	6
WC	(Sweden) F Bergevi (Sweden) F Simonsson	1	2
WC	(Sweden) P Rosenholm (Sweden) M Ryderstedt	0	2
2	(Austria) A Peya (Brazil) B Soares	6	6

Quarterfinals
1	(Sweden) R Lindstedt (Romania) H Tecău	7^{7}	6
(Australia) C Ebelthite (United Kingdom) J Murray	6^{5}	3
3	(Australia) P Hanley (Austria) J Knowle	6	6
(Brazil) J Souza (Argentina) H Zeballos	2	3
(Romania) A Ungur (Italy) F Volandri	6	6
(Argentina) F Delbonis (Spain) A Ramos	3	1
(Russia) M Elgin (Kazakhstan) M Kukushkin	6^{5}	5
2	(Austria) A Peya (Brazil) B Soares	7^{7}	7

Semifinals
1	(Sweden) R Lindstedt (Romania) H Tecău	6	6
3	(Australia) P Hanley (Austria) J Knowle	4	3
(Romania) A Ungur (Italy) F Volandri	2	0
2	(Austria) A Peya (Brazil) B Soares	6	6

Final
1	(Sweden) R Lindstedt (Romania) H Tecău	6	7^{7}
2	(Austria) A Peya (Brazil) B Soares	3	6^{5}
