= 2012 Swedish Open – Men's singles =

Men's singles
- 2012 Swedish Open

Final
- Champion: (Spain) David Ferrer
- Runner-up: (Spain) Nicolás Almagro
- Score: 6–2, 6–2

Details
- Draw: 28
- Seeds: 8

Events
Singles	men	women
Doubles	men	women
- Swedish Open

Robin Söderling was the defending champion, but chose not to participate due to illness prevented from playing the sport.

David Ferrer won the title, defeating Nicolás Almagro 6–2, 6–2 in the final.

== Seeds ==
The top four seeds receive a bye into the second round.

1. (Spain) David Ferrer (champion)
2. (Spain) Nicolás Almagro (final)
3. (Spain) Albert Ramos (quarterfinals)
4. (Finland) Jarkko Nieminen (second round)
5. (Kazakhstan) Mikhail Kukushkin (first round)
6. (Bulgaria) Grigor Dimitrov (semifinals)
7. (Italy) Filippo Volandri (second round)
8. (Romania) Adrian Ungur (first round)

== Draw ==
Key

- Q = Qualifier
- WC = Wild card
- LL = Lucky loser
- Alt = Alternate
- ITF = ITF entry
- PR = Protected ranking
- SR = Special ranking
- SE = Special exempt
- JE = Junior exempt
- JR = Junior Accelerator Programme entrant
- CO = College Accelerator Programme entrant
- NG = Next Gen Accelerator Program entrant
- w/o = Walkover
- r = Retired
- d = Defaulted

=== Finals ===
Semifinals
1	(Spain) David Ferrer	6	7
6	(Bulgaria) Grigor Dimitrov	3	5
(Czech Republic) Jan Hájek	4	3
2	(Spain) Nicolás Almagro	6	6

Final
1	(Spain) David Ferrer	6	6
2	(Spain) Nicolás Almagro	2	2

=== Top half ===
First round
(Chile) P Capdeville	6^{5}	6^{3}
(Italy) S Bolelli	7^{7}	7^{7}
(Argentina) H Zeballos	4	2
(Brazil) J Souza	6	6
WC	(Spain) T Robredo	6	6
8	(Romania) A Ungur	4	2
Q	(Kazakhstan) E Korolev	6	6
Q	(Brazil) T Alves	0	3
(Portugal) F Gil	6	1	6
(Turkey) M İlhan	4	6	3
(Brazil) R Dutra da Silva	1	4
6	(Bulgaria) G Dimitrov	6	6

Second round
1	(Spain) D Ferrer	6	6
(Italy) S Bolelli	4	3
(Brazil) J Souza	3	1
WC	(Spain) T Robredo	6	6
3	(Spain) A Ramos	6	6
Q	(Kazakhstan) E Korolev	3	3
(Portugal) F Gil	3	4
6	(Bulgaria) G Dimitrov	6	6

Quarterfinals
1	(Spain) D Ferrer	6	4	6
WC	(Spain) T Robredo	3	6	0
3	(Spain) A Ramos	6^{1}	3
6	(Bulgaria) G Dimitrov	7^{7}	6

Semifinals
1	(Spain) D Ferrer	6	7
6	(Bulgaria) G Dimitrov	3	5

=== Bottom half ===
First round
7	(Italy) F Volandri	6	6
WC	(Sweden) M Ryderstedt	4	2
WC	(Sweden) C Lindell	2	2
(Estonia) J Zopp	6	6
(Czech Republic) J Hájek	7^{7}	6
(Argentina) F Delbonis	6^{3}	3
5	(Kazakhstan) M Kukushkin	4	6	3
(Spain) D Gimeno Traver	6	3	6
(Germany) M Berrer	4	6	6^{5}
Q	(Italy) A Giannessi	6	3	7^{7}
(Spain) R Bautista Agut	5	6^{4}
Q	(Czech Republic) I Minář	7	7^{7}

Second round
7	(Italy) F Volandri	6	1	4
(Estonia) J Zopp	3	6	6
(Czech Republic) J Hájek	6	7^{7}
4	(Finland) J Nieminen	1	6^{2}
(Spain) D Gimeno Traver	6	6
Q	(Italy) A Giannessi	4	3
Q	(Czech Republic) I Minář	6	6^{8}	4
2	(Spain) N Almagro	1	7^{10}	6

Quarterfinals
(Estonia) J Zopp	3	6	3
(Czech Republic) J Hájek	6	4	6
(Spain) D Gimeno Traver	6^{5}	6	3
2	(Spain) N Almagro	7^{7}	4	6

Semifinals
(Czech Republic) J Hájek	4	3
2	(Spain) N Almagro	6	6

== Qualifying ==
=== Seeds ===
1. (Italy) Alessandro Giannessi (qualified)
2. (Brazil) Thiago Alves (qualified)
3. (Portugal) João Sousa (withdrew)
4. (France) Jonathan Dasnières de Veigy (first round)
5. (Brazil) Júlio Silva (second round)
6. (Czech Republic) Ivo Minář (qualified)
7. (Spain) Iván Navarro (qualifying competition)
8. (Poland) Michał Przysiężny (qualifying competition)

=== Qualifiers ===
1. (Italy) Alessandro Giannessi
2. (Brazil) Thiago Alves
3. (Czech Republic) Ivo Minář
4. (Kazakhstan) Evgeny Korolev

=== Draw ===
==== First qualifier ====
First round
1	(Italy) Alessandro Giannessi	6	6
WC	(Sweden) Isak Arvidsson	3	4
(Sweden) Milos Sekulic	6	6
(United States) William Boe-Wiegaard	3	2
(Sweden) Daniel Berta	3	2
(Kuwait) Mohammed Ghareeb	6	6
(Russia) Mikhail Elgin	3	4
8	(Poland) Michał Przysiężny	6	6

Second round
1	(Italy) Alessandro Giannessi	6	6
(Sweden) Milos Sekulic	0	2
(Kuwait) Mohammed Ghareeb	7^{10}	1	4
8	(Poland) Michał Przysiężny	6^{8}	6	6

Qualifying competition
1	(Italy) Alessandro Giannessi	6	6
8	(Poland) Michał Przysiężny	3	2

==== Second qualifier ====
First round
2	(Brazil) Thiago Alves	6	7
(Kuwait) Abdullah Maqdes	1	5
(Spain) Óscar Sabate-Bretos	0^{r}
(Sweden) Lucas Renard	1
WC	(Sweden) Johan Bäckström	2	0
(Sweden) Patrik Rosenholm	6	6
(Sweden) Markus Eriksson	3	4
7	(Spain) Iván Navarro	6	6

Second round
2	(Brazil) Thiago Alves	7^{7}	5	7
(Sweden) Lucas Renard	6^{4}	7	5
(Sweden) Patrik Rosenholm	5	6^{6}
7	(Spain) Iván Navarro	7	7^{8}

Qualifying competition
2	(Brazil) Thiago Alves	7	6
7	(Spain) Iván Navarro	5	4

==== Third qualifier ====
First round
Alt	(Sweden) Igor Tubic	6	4	1
WC	(Sweden) Ervin Eleskovic	2	6	6
(Switzerland) Henri Laaksonen	6	6
(Cyprus) Photos Kallias	2	1
(Sweden) Oskar Pallin	6	6
(Italy) Giorgio Portaluri	4	3
(Sweden) Kalle Averfalk	1	3
6	(Czech Republic) Ivo Minář	6	6

Second round
WC	(Sweden) Ervin Eleskovic	6	5	3
(Switzerland) Henri Laaksonen	3	7	6
(Sweden) Oskar Pallin	2	5
6	(Czech Republic) Ivo Minář	6	7

Qualifying competition
(Switzerland) Henri Laaksonen	2	6^{2}
6	(Czech Republic) Ivo Minář	6	7^{7}

==== Fourth qualifier ====
First round
4	(France) Jonathan Dasnières de Veigy	1	4
(Kazakhstan) Evgeny Korolev	6	6
(Sweden) Robin Olin	6	6
(Sweden) Tobias Blömgren	3	4
(Sweden) Patrik Brydolf	2	4
(Monaco) Benjamin Balleret	6	6
WC	(Sweden) Fred Simonsson	2	7^{7}	3
5	(Brazil) Júlio Silva	6	6^{3}	6

Second round
(Kazakhstan) Evgeny Korolev	6	6
(Sweden) Robin Olin	1	4
(Monaco) Benjamin Balleret	6	7
5	(Brazil) Júlio Silva	4	5

Qualifying competition
(Kazakhstan) Evgeny Korolev	6	6
(Monaco) Benjamin Balleret	2	0
