= 2012 Swedish Open – Women's doubles =

Women's doubles
- 2012 Swedish Open

Final
- Champions: (Colombia) Catalina Castaño (Colombia) Mariana Duque Mariño
- Runners-up: (Czech Republic) Eva Hrdinová (Bosnia and Herzegovina) Mervana Jugić-Salkić
- Score: 4–6, 7–5, [10–5]

Details
- Draw: 16
- Seeds: 4

Events
Singles	men	women
Doubles	men	women
- Swedish Open

Lourdes Domínguez Lino and María José Martínez Sánchez were the defending champions but Martínez Sánchez did not participate on account of her getting married on July 14.
Domínguez Lino played alongside Anabel Medina Garrigues, but they withdrew from the first round due to a thigh muscle strain from Domínguez Lino.
Catalina Castaño and Mariana Duque Mariño won the final 4–6, 7–5, [10–5] against Eva Hrdinová and Mervana Jugić-Salkić.

== Seeds ==
1. (Germany) Julia Görges / (Russia) Anastasia Pavlyuchenkova (quarterfinals, withdrew because of a foot injury for Görges)
2. (Belarus) Olga Govortsova / (Poland) Klaudia Jans-Ignacik (quarterfinals, withdrew because of a viral illness for Govortsova)
3. (Croatia) Darija Jurak / (Hungary) Katalin Marosi (first round)
4. (Spain) Lourdes Domínguez Lino / (Spain) Anabel Medina Garrigues (first round, withdrew because of a thigh muscle strain for Domínguez Lino)

== Draw ==
Key

- Q = Qualifier
- WC = Wild card
- LL = Lucky loser
- Alt = Alternate
- ITF = ITF entry
- PR = Protected ranking
- SR = Special ranking
- SE = Special exempt
- JE = Junior exempt
- JR = Junior Accelerator Programme entrant
- CO = College Accelerator Programme entrant
- NG = Next Gen Accelerator Program entrant
- w/o = Walkover
- r = Retired
- d = Defaulted

=== Draw ===
First round
1	(Germany) J Görges (Russia) A Pavlyuchenkova	6	7^{7}
(Russia) M Kondratieva (France) S Lefèvre	1	6^{5}
(Sweden) S Arvidsson (Sweden) J Larsson	3	6	[10]
(Spain) I Ferrer Suárez (Netherlands) R Hogenkamp	6	3	[4]
4	(Spain) L Domínguez Lino (Spain) A Medina Garrigues
(Uzbekistan) A Amanmuradova (Ukraine) K Bondarenko	w/o
WC	(Sweden) H Melander (Sweden) S Roma	6^{5}	1
(Czech Republic) E Hrdinová (Bosnia and Herzegovina) M Jugić-Salkić	7^{7}	6
(Italy) A Grymalska (Venezuela) A Pérez	4	3
(Austria) S Klemenschits (Germany) T Malek	6	6
(Russia) V Solovieva (Georgia (country)) A Tatishvili	5	6	[10]
3	(Croatia) D Jurak (Hungary) K Marosi	7	2	[4]
(United States) J Craybas (Czech Republic) K Zakopalová	5	4
(Colombia) C Castaño (Colombia) M Duque Mariño	7	6
WC	(Sweden) B Cedermark (Sweden) R Peterson	4	2
2	(Belarus) O Govortsova (Poland) K Jans-Ignacik	6	6

Quarterfinals
1	(Germany) J Görges (Russia) A Pavlyuchenkova
(Sweden) S Arvidsson (Sweden) J Larsson	w/o
(Uzbekistan) A Amanmuradova (Ukraine) K Bondarenko	6	1	[5]
(Czech Republic) E Hrdinová (Bosnia and Herzegovina) M Jugić-Salkić	3	6	[10]
(Austria) S Klemenschits (Germany) T Malek	6	5	[10]
(Russia) V Solovieva (Georgia (country)) A Tatishvili	3	7	[5]
(Colombia) C Castaño (Colombia) M Duque Mariño	w/o
2	(Belarus) O Govortsova (Poland) K Jans-Ignacik

Semifinals
(Sweden) S Arvidsson (Sweden) J Larsson	7	1	[7]
(Czech Republic) E Hrdinová (Bosnia and Herzegovina) M Jugić-Salkić	5	6	[10]
(Austria) S Klemenschits (Germany) T Malek	5	2
(Colombia) C Castaño (Colombia) M Duque Mariño	7	6

Final
(Czech Republic) E Hrdinová (Bosnia and Herzegovina) M Jugić-Salkić	6	5	[5]
(Colombia) C Castaño (Colombia) M Duque Mariño	4	7	[10]
