= 2011 Abierto Mexicano Telcel – Men's singles =

Men's singles
- 2011 Abierto Mexicano Telcel

Final
- Champion: (Spain) David Ferrer
- Runner-up: (Spain) Nicolás Almagro
- Score: 7–6^{(7–4)}, 6–7^{(2–7)}, 6–2

Events
Singles	men	women
Doubles	men	women
- Abierto Mexicano Telcel

Defending champion David Ferrer successfully retained his title by defeating Nicolás Almagro 7–6^{(7–4)}, 6–7^{(2–7)}, 6–2 in the final.

== Seeds ==
1. (Spain) David Ferrer (champion)
2. (Spain) Fernando Verdasco (first round)
3. (Spain) Nicolás Almagro (final)
4. (Switzerland) Stanislas Wawrinka (quarterfinals)
5. (Spain) Albert Montañés (second round)
6. (Ukraine) Alexandr Dolgopolov (semifinals)
7. (Argentina) Juan Mónaco (quarterfinals)
8. (Argentina) Juan Ignacio Chela (first round, retired)

== Draw ==
Key

- Q = Qualifier
- WC = Wild card
- LL = Lucky loser
- Alt = Alternate
- ITF = ITF entry
- PR = Protected ranking
- SR = Special ranking
- SE = Special exempt
- JE = Junior exempt
- JR = Junior Accelerator Programme entrant
- CO = College Accelerator Programme entrant
- NG = Next Gen Accelerator Program entrant
- w/o = Walkover
- r = Retired
- d = Defaulted

=== Finals ===
Semifinals
1	(Spain) David Ferrer	5	6	6
6	(Ukraine) Alexandr Dolgopolov	7	1	1
3	(Spain) Nicolás Almagro	7	6
(Brazil) Thomaz Bellucci	6^{4}	4

Final
1	(Spain) David Ferrer	7	6^{2}	6
3	(Spain) Nicolás Almagro	6^{4}	7	2

=== Top half ===
First round
1	(Spain) D Ferrer	6	6
Q	(Romania) A Ungur	1	3
WC	(Mexico) S González	6	7
WC	(Mexico) D Garza	2	6^{5}
(Italy) P Starace	4	4
(Uruguay) P Cuevas	6	6
LL	(Argentina) H Zeballos	5	6^{3}
7	(Argentina) J Mónaco	7	7
4	(Switzerland) S Wawrinka	7	3	6
(Spain) P Andújar	6^{5}	6	0
Q	(Argentina) M González	3	4
(Italy) F Fognini	6	6
LL	(Spain) D Muñoz-De La Nava	3	7	1
(Argentina) C Berlocq	6	5	6
Q	(Chile) P Capdeville	5	2
6	(Ukraine) A Dolgopolov	7	6

Second round
1	(Spain) D Ferrer	6	6
WC	(Mexico) S González	2	2
(Uruguay) P Cuevas	3	4
7	(Argentina) J Mónaco	6	6
4	(Switzerland) S Wawrinka	5	6	7
(Italy) F Fognini	7	3	5
(Argentina) C Berlocq	4	1
6	(Ukraine) A Dolgopolov	6	6

Quarterfinals
1	(Spain) D Ferrer	2	7	6
7	(Argentina) J Mónaco	6	5	2
4	(Switzerland) S Wawrinka	4	6^{6}
6	(Ukraine) A Dolgopolov	6	7

Semifinals
1	(Spain) D Ferrer	5	6	6
6	(Ukraine) A Dolgopolov	7	1	1

=== Bottom half ===
First round
5	(Spain) A Montañés	6	6
(Spain) D Gimeno Traver	2	1
Q	(Spain) A Ramos-Viñolas	6	5	5
(Colombia) S Giraldo	4	7	7
LL	(Portugal) F Gil	1	6	4
(Italy) F Volandri	6	3	6
(Romania) V Hănescu	3	2
3	(Spain) N Almagro	6	6
8	(Argentina) JI Chela	6	5	r
(Argentina) E Schwank	3	6
(Spain) R Ramírez Hidalgo	5	0
(Poland) Ł Kubot	7	6
LL	(Spain) I Navarro	6	3	6
WC	(Mexico) M Sánchez	1	6	1
(Brazil) T Bellucci	6	4	6
2	(Spain) F Verdasco	2	6	3

Second round
5	(Spain) A Montañés	3	4
(Colombia) S Giraldo	6	6
(Italy) F Volandri	2	2
3	(Spain) N Almagro	6	6
(Argentina) E Schwank	7	4	4
(Poland) Ł Kubot	6^{8}	6	6
LL	(Spain) I Navarro	6	4	3
(Brazil) T Bellucci	1	6	6

Quarterfinals
(Colombia) S Giraldo	6^{0}	7	4
3	(Spain) N Almagro	7	5	6
(Poland) Ł Kubot	7	3	4
(Brazil) T Bellucci	6^{5}	6	6

Semifinals
3	(Spain) N Almagro	7	6
(Brazil) T Bellucci	6^{4}	4
