= 2010 Abierto Mexicano Telcel – Men's singles =

Men's singles
- 2010 Abierto Mexicano Telcel

Final
- Champion: (Spain) David Ferrer
- Runner-up: (Spain) Juan Carlos Ferrero
- Score: 6–3, 3–6, 6–1

Events
Singles	men	women
Doubles	men	women
- Abierto Mexicano Telcel

Nicolás Almagro was the defending champion; however, he lost 1–6, 7–5, 2–6 to Juan Carlos Ferrero in the quarterfinals.
David Ferrer won in the final 6–3, 3–6, 6–1 against Ferrero.

== Seeds ==
1. (Spain) Fernando Verdasco (quarterfinals)
2. (Chile) Fernando González (semifinals)
3. (Spain) David Ferrer (champion)
4. (Spain) Juan Carlos Ferrero (final)
5. (United States) John Isner (first round)
6. (Spain) Nicolás Almagro (quarterfinals)
7. (Argentina) Juan Mónaco (semifinals, retired due to an abdominal strain)
8. (Spain) Albert Montañés (second round)

== Draw ==
Key

- Q = Qualifier
- WC = Wild card
- LL = Lucky loser
- Alt = Alternate
- ITF = ITF entry
- PR = Protected ranking
- SR = Special ranking
- SE = Special exempt
- JE = Junior exempt
- JR = Junior Accelerator Programme entrant
- CO = College Accelerator Programme entrant
- NG = Next Gen Accelerator Program entrant
- w/o = Walkover
- r = Retired
- d = Defaulted

=== Finals ===
Semifinals
7	(Argentina) Juan Mónaco	5	0^{r}
4	(Spain) Juan Carlos Ferrero	7	0
3	(Spain) David Ferrer	6^{4}	6	6
2	(Chile) Fernando González	7^{7}	0	4

Final
4	(Spain) Juan Carlos Ferrero	3	6	1
3	(Spain) David Ferrer	6	3	6

=== Top half ===
First round
1/WC	(Spain) F Verdasco	2	6	6
(Italy) F Fognini	6	4	0
(Poland) Ł Kubot	6	6
(Argentina) H Zeballos	1	2
(Australia) P Luczak	0	6	0
(Argentina) JI Chela	6	1	6
Q	(Spain) A Martín	7^{8}	5	2
7	(Argentina) J Mónaco	6^{6}	7	6
4	(Spain) JC Ferrero	6	6
Q	(Argentina) D Junqueira	2	3
Q	(Romania) V Crivoi	3	4
(Russia) I Andreev	6	6
WC	(Spain) C Moyá	6	3	2
(France) R Gasquet	4	6	6
(Israel) D Sela	1	6^{0}
6	(Spain) N Almagro	6	7^{7}

Second round
1/WC	(Spain) F Verdasco	6	6
(Poland) Ł Kubot	4	3
(Argentina) JI Chela	4	6^{4}
7	(Argentina) J Mónaco	6	7^{7}
4	(Spain) JC Ferrero	6	6
(Russia) I Andreev	4	3
(France) R Gasquet	6	5	6^{7}
6	(Spain) N Almagro	3	7	7^{9}

Quarterfinals
1/WC	(Spain) F Verdasco	5	3
7	(Argentina) J Mónaco	7	6
4	(Spain) JC Ferrero	6	5	6
6	(Spain) N Almagro	1	7	2

Semifinals
7	(Argentina) J Mónaco	5	r
4	(Spain) JC Ferrero	7

=== Bottom half ===
First round
8	(Spain) A Montañés	7	4	6
(Spain) D Gimeno-Traver	5	6	2
(Uruguay) P Cuevas	1	7	7^{10}
(Brazil) M Daniel	6	5	6^{8}
(Brazil) T Bellucci	6	6
(Spain) Ó Hernández	3	2
(Italy) P Starace	2	4
3	(Spain) D Ferrer	6	6
5	(United States) J Isner	6^{4}	5
(Germany) S Greul	7^{7}	7
WC	(Mexico) S González	6^{4}	6^{4}
Q	(Argentina) E Schwank	7^{7}	7^{7}
(Romania) V Hănescu	7^{7}	6
(Portugal) F Gil	6^{5}	3
(United States) S Querrey	4	6	6^{2}
2	(Chile) F González	6	3	7^{7}

Second round
8	(Spain) A Montañés	5	3
(Uruguay) P Cuevas	7	6
(Brazil) T Bellucci	4	1
3	(Spain) D Ferrer	6	6
(Germany) S Greul	6^{4}	3
Q	(Argentina) E Schwank	7^{7}	6
(Romania) V Hănescu	6^{2}	6	1
2	(Chile) F González	7^{7}	3	6

Quarterfinals
(Uruguay) P Cuevas	5	4
3	(Spain) D Ferrer	7	6
Q	(Argentina) E Schwank	6	3	5
2	(Chile) F González	3	6	7

Semifinals
3	(Spain) D Ferrer	6^{4}	6	6
2	(Chile) F González	7^{7}	0	4

== Qualifying ==
=== Seeds ===
1. (Argentina) Eduardo Schwank (qualified)
2. (Chile) Nicolás Massú (qualifying competition)
3. (Romania) Victor Crivoi (qualified)
4. (Israel) Harel Levy (qualifying competition)
5. (Spain) Alberto Martín (qualified)
6. (Argentina) Gastón Gaudio (first round)
7. (Argentina) Sebastián Decoud (qualifying competition)
8. (Argentina) Diego Junqueira (qualified)

=== Qualifiers ===
1. (Argentina) Eduardo Schwank
2. (Argentina) Diego Junqueira
3. (Romania) Victor Crivoi
4. (Spain) Alberto Martín

=== Draw ===
==== First qualifier ====
First round
1	(Argentina) Eduardo Schwank	6	6
(Mexico) Víctor Romero	2	3
(Austria) Oliver Marach	6	2	6
6	(Argentina) Gastón Gaudio	2	6	3

Qualifying competition
1	(Argentina) Eduardo Schwank	6	6
(Austria) Oliver Marach	4	2

==== Second qualifier ====
First round
2	(Chile) Nicolás Massú	6	6
WC	(Mexico) Juan-Manuel Elizondo	1	2
(Mexico) Bruno Rodríguez	0	4
8	(Argentina) Diego Junqueira	6	6

Qualifying competition
2	(Chile) Nicolás Massú	4	7	4
8	(Argentina) Diego Junqueira	6	5	6

==== Third qualifier ====
First round
3	(Romania) Victor Crivoi	6	6
(Mexico) Manuel Sánchez	0	3
WC	(Mexico) Luis Díaz Barriga	3	3
7	(Argentina) Sebastián Decoud	6	6

Qualifying competition
3	(Romania) Victor Crivoi	6	6
7	(Argentina) Sebastián Decoud	2	4

==== Fourth qualifier ====
First round
4	(Israel) Harel Levy	6	6
WC	(Mexico) Mauricio Astorga	2	1
(United States) John Paul Fruttero	4	4
5	(Spain) Alberto Martín	6	6

Qualifying competition
4	(Israel) Harel Levy	3	6^{5}
5	(Spain) Alberto Martín	6	7^{7}
