= 2012 Swedish Open – Women's singles =

Women's singles
- 2012 Swedish Open

Final
- Champion: (Slovenia) Polona Hercog
- Runner-up: (France) Mathilde Johansson
- Score: 0–6, 6–4, 7–5

Details
- Draw: 32
- Seeds: 8

Events
Singles	men	women
Doubles	men	women
- Swedish Open

Polona Hercog was defending champion, and successfully retained her title after defeating Mathilde Johansson in the final 0–6, 6–4, 7–5.

== Seeds ==
1. (Italy) Sara Errani (withdrew because of a shoulder injury)
2. (Germany) Julia Görges (second round)
3. (Spain) Anabel Medina Garrigues (second round)
4. (Italy) Roberta Vinci (first round)
5. (Russia) Anastasia Pavlyuchenkova (quarterfinals)
6. (Czech Republic) Klára Zakopalová (quarterfinals, retired)
7. (Germany) Mona Barthel (semifinals)
8. (Spain) Carla Suárez Navarro (first round)

== Draw ==
Key

- Q = Qualifier
- WC = Wild card
- LL = Lucky loser
- Alt = Alternate
- ITF = ITF entry
- PR = Protected ranking
- SR = Special ranking
- SE = Special exempt
- JE = Junior exempt
- JR = Junior Accelerator Programme entrant
- CO = College Accelerator Programme entrant
- NG = Next Gen Accelerator Program entrant
- w/o = Walkover
- r = Retired
- d = Defaulted

=== Finals ===
Semifinals
(France) Mathilde Johansson	6	6
(Sweden) Johanna Larsson	4	4
7	(Germany) Mona Barthel	1	3
(Slovenia) Polona Hercog	6	6

Final
(France) Mathilde Johansson	6	4	5
(Slovenia) Polona Hercog	0	6	7

=== Top half ===
First round
LL	(United States) J Craybas	4	1
(France) M Johansson	6	6
(Israel) S Pe'er	6	2
Q	(Spain) L Domínguez Lino	4	0^{r}
(Georgia (country)) A Tatishvili	6	3	0
(Spain) S Soler Espinosa	4	6	6
(Austria) P Mayr-Achleitner	2	2
5	(Russia) A Pavlyuchenkova	6	6
3	(Spain) A Medina Garrigues	6	7^{7}
WC	(United Kingdom) L Robson	4	6^{4}
(Sweden) J Larsson	7^{8}	4
(Belarus) O Govortsova	6^{6}	3^{r}
WC	(Sweden) S Roma	5	1
Q	(Colombia) M Duque Mariño	7	6
Q	(Germany) A Beck	6	3	4
6	(Czech Republic) K Zakopalová	2	6	6

Second round
(France) M Johansson	6	3	6
(Israel) S Pe'er	2	6	2
(Spain) S Soler Espinosa	4	0
5	(Russia) A Pavlyuchenkova	6	6
3	(Spain) A Medina Garrigues	4	4
(Sweden) J Larsson	6	6
Q	(Colombia) M Duque Mariño	0	1
6	(Czech Republic) K Zakopalová	6	6

Quarterfinals
(France) M Johansson	6	6
5	(Russia) A Pavlyuchenkova	4	0
(Sweden) J Larsson	2
6	(Czech Republic) K Zakopalová	0^{r}

Semifinals
(France) M Johansson	6	6
(Sweden) J Larsson	4	4

=== Bottom half ===
First round
7	(Germany) M Barthel	6	6
(Netherlands) K Bertens	3	2
Q	(Germany) C Witthöft	2	6^{5}
(Ukraine) K Bondarenko	6	7^{7}
WC	(Sweden) R Peterson	1	2
(Netherlands) A Rus	6	6
(Sweden) S Arvidsson	6	7
4	(Italy) R Vinci	4	5
8	(Spain) C Suárez Navarro	5	0
(Ukraine) L Tsurenko	7	6
(Bulgaria) T Pironkova	6	7
(Czech Republic) L Hradecká	2	5
(Russia) A Panova	5	5
(Slovenia) P Hercog	7	7
(Czech Republic) B Záhlavová-Strýcová	2	2
2	(Germany) J Görges	6	6

Second round
7	(Germany) M Barthel	6	7
(Ukraine) K Bondarenko	2	5
(Netherlands) A Rus	4	5
(Sweden) S Arvidsson	6	7
(Ukraine) L Tsurenko	5	3
(Bulgaria) T Pironkova	7	6
(Slovenia) P Hercog	7^{7}	6
2	(Germany) J Görges	6^{4}	2

Quarterfinals
7	(Germany) M Barthel	6	6
(Sweden) S Arvidsson	3	4
(Bulgaria) T Pironkova	6	5	4
(Slovenia) P Hercog	3	7	6

Semifinals
7	(Germany) M Barthel	1	3
(Slovenia) P Hercog	6	6

== Qualifying ==
=== Seeds ===
1. (Spain) Lourdes Domínguez Lino (qualified)
2. (Uzbekistan) Akgul Amanmuradova (second round)
3. (Colombia) Mariana Duque Mariño (qualified)
4. (Germany) Tatjana Malek (second round)
5. (Germany) Annika Beck (qualified)
6. (United States) Jill Craybas (qualifying competition, lucky loser)
7. (Australia) Sacha Jones (qualifying competition)
8. (Russia) Olga Puchkova (qualifying competition)

=== Qualifiers ===
1. (Spain) Lourdes Domínguez Lino
2. (Germany) Carina Witthöft
3. (Colombia) Mariana Duque Mariño
4. (Germany) Annika Beck

=== Lucky loser ===
1. (United States) Jill Craybas

=== Draw ===
==== First qualifier ====
First round
1	(Spain) Lourdes Domínguez Lino	6	6
(Switzerland) Amra Sadiković	3	4
(Spain) Beatriz García Vidagany	1	0^{r}
(Slovenia) Petra Rampre	6	2
(Belgium) Alison Van Uytvanck	6	4	0^{r}
WC	(Sweden) Hilda Melander	2	6	0
(Peru) Bianca Botto	3	2
7	(Australia) Sacha Jones	6	6

Second round
1	(Spain) Lourdes Domínguez Lino	6	6
(Slovenia) Petra Rampre	3	4
WC	(Sweden) Hilda Melander	2	1
7	(Australia) Sacha Jones	6	6

Qualifying competition
1	(Spain) Lourdes Domínguez Lino	7^{7}	6
7	(Australia) Sacha Jones	6^{4}	2

==== Second qualifier ====
First round
2	(Uzbekistan) Akgul Amanmuradova	6	7^{7}
(Croatia) Ana Vrljić	3	6^{3}
(Germany) Carina Witthöft	6	6
(Russia) Marina Shamayko	4	4
WC	(Sweden) Beatrice Cedermark	2	2
(Bosnia and Herzegovina) Mervana Jugić-Salkić	6	6
(Spain) Inés Ferrer Suárez	2	2
6	(United States) Jill Craybas	6	6

Second round
2	(Uzbekistan) Akgul Amanmuradova	0	6	6^{1}
(Germany) Carina Witthöft	6	3	7^{7}
(Bosnia and Herzegovina) Mervana Jugić-Salkić	3	6^{1}
6	(United States) Jill Craybas	6	7^{7}

Qualifying competition
(Germany) Carina Witthöft	3	7^{7}	6
6	(United States) Jill Craybas	6	6^{3}	3

==== Third qualifier ====
First round
3	(Colombia) Mariana Duque Mariño	6	3
(Australia) Karolina Wlodarczak	4	4^{r}
(Venezuela) Andrea Gámiz	7^{8}	6
(Slovakia) Michaela Hončová	6^{6}	2
(Colombia) Catalina Castaño	7^{7}	7
(Russia) Valeria Solovieva	6^{5}	5
(France) Audrey Bergot	6^{4}	7^{7}	4
8	(Russia) Olga Puchkova	7^{7}	6^{5}	6

Second round
3	(Colombia) Mariana Duque Mariño	6	6
(Venezuela) Andrea Gámiz	2	3
(Colombia) Catalina Castaño	6	5	6^{2}
8	(Russia) Olga Puchkova	1	7	7^{7}

Qualifying competition
3	(Colombia) Mariana Duque Mariño	6	7
8	(Russia) Olga Puchkova	4	5

==== Fourth qualifier ====
First round
4	(Germany) Tatjana Malek	6	6
WC	(Sweden) Eveliina Virtanen	1	4
(Russia) Elena Bovina	2	6	3
(Netherlands) Richèl Hogenkamp	6	4	6
(Italy) Anastasia Grymalska	4	6	6
(Venezuela) Adriana Pérez	6	4	1
WC	(Sweden) Jacqueline Cabaj Awad	1	2
5	(Germany) Annika Beck	6	6

Second round
4	(Germany) Tatjana Malek	2	4
(Netherlands) Richèl Hogenkamp	6	6
(Italy) Anastasia Grymalska	4	3
5	(Germany) Annika Beck	6	6

Qualifying competition
(Netherlands) Richèl Hogenkamp	2	2
5	(Germany) Annika Beck	6	6
