= 2010 Abierto Mexicano Telcel – Women's singles =

Women's singles
- 2010 Abierto Mexicano Telcel

Final
- Champion: (United States) Venus Williams
- Runner-up: (Slovenia) Polona Hercog
- Score: 2–6, 6–2, 6–3

Details
- Draw: 32
- Seeds: 8

Events
| Singles | men | women |
| Doubles | men | women |
- Abierto Mexicano Telcel

Venus Williams was the defending champion, and she won in the final 2–6, 6–2, 6–3 against Polona Hercog.

== Seeds ==
1. (United States) Venus Williams (champion)
2. (Hungary) Ágnes Szávay (quarterfinals, retired due to a left abdominal strain)
3. (Argentina) Gisela Dulko (quarterfinals)
4. (Romania) Sorana Cîrstea (first round)
5. (Spain) Carla Suárez Navarro (semifinals)
6. (Italy) Sara Errani (second round)
7. (Italy) Roberta Vinci (second round)
8. (Slovenia) Polona Hercog (final)

== Draw ==
Key

- Q = Qualifier
- WC = Wild card
- LL = Lucky loser
- Alt = Alternate
- ITF = ITF entry
- PR = Protected ranking
- SR = Special ranking
- SE = Special exempt
- JE = Junior exempt
- JR = Junior Accelerator Programme entrant
- CO = College Accelerator Programme entrant
- NG = Next Gen Accelerator Program entrant
- w/o = Walkover
- r = Retired
- d = Defaulted

=== Finals ===
Semifinals
1 | (United States) Venus Williams | 6 | 2 | 6
(Romania) Edina Gallovits | 4 | 6 | 2
5 | (Spain) Carla Suárez Navarro | 3 | 5
8 | (Slovenia) Polona Hercog | 6 | 7

Final
1 | (United States) Venus Williams | 2 | 6 | 6
8 | (Slovenia) Polona Hercog | 6 | 2 | 3

=== Top half ===
First round
1 | (United States) V Williams | 6 | 6
(France) M Johansson | 2 | 3
WC | (Mexico) A Granillo | 0 | 1
(Estonia) K Kanepi | 6 | 6
Q | (Spain) L Pous Tió | 2 | 6 | 6
(Austria) P Mayr | 6 | 2 | 1
(Spain) A Parra Santonja | 6 | 3 | 4
7 | (Italy) R Vinci | 2 | 6 | 6
4/WC | (Romania) S Cîrstea | 2 | 0
(Canada) S Fichman | 6 | 6
(Ukraine) M Koryttseva | 5 | 7 | 6
(Germany) A Kerber | 7 | 5 | 4
(Romania) E Gallovits | 6 | 6
WC | (Kazakhstan) Z Diyas | 3 | 3
(Slovenia) M Zec Peškirič | 3 | 2
6 | (Italy) S Errani | 6 | 6

Second round
1 | (United States) V Williams | 6 | 6
(Estonia) K Kanepi | 4 | 4
Q | (Spain) L Pous Tió | 6 | 6
7 | (Italy) R Vinci | 3 | 2
(Canada) S Fichman | 6 | 6
(Ukraine) M Koryttseva | 2 | 3
(Romania) E Gallovits | 6 | 5 | 6
6 | (Italy) S Errani | 4 | 7 | 4

Quarterfinals
1 | (United States) V Williams | 4 | 6 | 7
Q | (Spain) L Pous Tió | 6 | 3 | 5
(Canada) S Fichman | 5 | 2
(Romania) E Gallovits | 7 | 6

Semifinals
1 | (United States) V Williams | 6 | 2 | 6
(Romania) E Gallovits | 4 | 6 | 2

=== Bottom half ===
First round
5 | (Spain) C Suárez Navarro | 6 | 6
Q | (Hungary) G Arn | 0 | 0
Q | (Colombia) C Castaño | 5 | 6 | 7
(Czech Republic) K Zakopalová | 7 | 4 | 5
(Czech Republic) B Záhlavová-Strýcová | 6 | 6
(Germany) K Wörle | 4 | 2
Q | (Czech Republic) L Hradecká | 1 | 6 | 1
3 | (Argentina) G Dulko | 6 | 2 | 6
8 | (Slovenia) P Hercog | 6 | 6
(Paraguay) R de los Ríos | 4 | 1
(France) A Cornet | 6 | 6
(United States) J Craybas | 2 | 2
(Czech Republic) R Voráčová | 7 | 7
(France) P Parmentier | 6^{4} | 6^{2}
(Czech Republic) S Záhlavová | 6 | 1 | 3
2 | (Hungary) Á Szávay | 2 | 6 | 6

Second round
5 | (Spain) C Suárez Navarro | 6 | 4 | 6
Q | (Colombia) C Castaño | 1 | 6 | 2
(Czech Republic) B Záhlavová-Strýcová | 5 | 1
3 | (Argentina) G Dulko | 7 | 6
8 | (Slovenia) P Hercog | 6 | 6
(France) A Cornet | 2 | 4
(Czech Republic) R Voráčová | 5 | 1
2 | (Hungary) Á Szávay | 7 | 6

Quarterfinals
5 | (Spain) C Suárez Navarro | 6 | 7
3 | (Argentina) G Dulko | 1 | 6^{4}
8 | (Slovenia) P Hercog | 6 | 0
2 | (Hungary) Á Szávay | 4 | 1 | r

Semifinals
5 | (Spain) C Suárez Navarro | 3 | 5
8 | (Slovenia) P Hercog | 6 | 7
