= 2011 Abierto Mexicano Telcel =

- Date: 21–26 February
- Edition: 18th (men) / 11th (women)
- Surface: Clay / Outdoor
- Location: Acapulco, Mexico

Champions

Men's singles
- (Spain) David Ferrer

Women's singles
- (Argentina) Gisela Dulko

Men's doubles
- (Romania) Victor Hănescu / (Romania) Horia Tecău

Women's doubles
- (Ukraine) Mariya Koryttseva / (Romania) Ioana Raluca Olaru
← 2010 ·	Mexican Open	· 2012 →

The 2011 Abierto Mexicano Telcel was a professional tennis tournament played on clay courts. It was the 18th edition of the men's tournament (11th for the women), which was part of the 2011 ATP World Tour and the 2011 WTA Tour. It took place in Acapulco, Mexico between 21 and 26 February 2011.

== ATP entrants ==
=== Seeds ===
Country	Player	Rank^{1}	Seed
ESP	David Ferrer	6	1
ESP	Fernando Verdasco	9	2
ESP	Nicolás Almagro	13	3
SUI	Stanislas Wawrinka	15	4
ESP	Albert Montañés	25	5
UKR	Alexandr Dolgopolov	29	6
ARG	Juan Mónaco	30	7
ARG	Juan Ignacio Chela	35	8

- Rankings are as of February 14, 2011.

=== Other entrants ===
The following players received wildcards into the singles main draw:

- (Mexico) Daniel Garza
- (Mexico) Santiago González
- (Mexico) Manuel Sánchez

The following entrant has been granted a Special Exemption into the main draw:

- (Canada) Milos Raonic (withdrew)

The following players received entry from the qualifying draw:

- (Chile) Paul Capdeville
- (Argentina) Máximo González
- (Spain) Albert Ramos Viñolas
- (Romania) Adrian Ungur

The following players received entry as lucky losers into the singles main draw:

- (Portugal) Frederico Gil (for Nalbandian)
- (Argentina) Horacio Zeballos (for Robredo)
- (Spain) Daniel Muñoz de la Nava (for Raonic)
- (Spain) Iván Navarro (for Riba)

== WTA entrants ==
=== Seeds ===
Country	Player	Rank^{1}	Seed
GER	Julia Görges	34	1
SLO	Polona Hercog	49	2
HUN	Gréta Arn	59	3
ARG	Gisela Dulko	60	4
ROU	Simona Halep	61	5
ESP	Arantxa Parra Santonja	63	6
ESP	Carla Suárez Navarro	65	7
BLR	Olga Govortsova	70	8

- Rankings are as of February 14, 2011.

=== Other entrants ===
The following players received wildcards into the singles main draw:

- (Mexico) Ximena Hermoso
- (Czech Republic) Karolína Plíšková
- (Czech Republic) Kristýna Plíšková

The following players received entry from the qualifying draw:

- (Romania) Mădălina Gojnea
- (Spain) Sílvia Soler Espinosa
- (Georgia (country)) Anna Tatishvili
- (Ukraine) Lesia Tsurenko

== Finals ==
=== Men's singles ===
(Spain) David Ferrer defeated (Spain) Nicolás Almagro, 7–6^{(7–4)}, 6–7^{(2–7)}, 6–2

- It was Ferrer's 2nd title of the year and 11th of his career. It was his 2nd consecutive win at the event.

=== Women's singles ===
(Argentina) Gisela Dulko defeated (Spain) Arantxa Parra Santonja, 6–3, 7–6^{(7–5)}

- It was Dulko's first title of the year and fourth of her career.

=== Men's doubles ===
(Romania) Victor Hănescu / (Romania) Horia Tecău defeated (Brazil) Marcelo Melo / (Brazil) Bruno Soares, 6–1, 6–3

=== Women's doubles ===
(Ukraine) Mariya Koryttseva / (Romania) Ioana Raluca Olaru defeated (Spain) Lourdes Domínguez Lino / (Spain) Arantxa Parra Santonja, 3–6, 6–1, [10–4]
