= 2011 Abierto Mexicano Telcel – Men's doubles =

Men's doubles
- 2011 Abierto Mexicano Telcel

Final
- Champions: (Romania) Victor Hănescu (Romania) Horia Tecău
- Runners-up: (Brazil) Marcelo Melo (Brazil) Bruno Soares
- Score: 6–1, 6–3

Events
Singles	men	women
Doubles	men	women
- Abierto Mexicano Telcel

Łukasz Kubot and Oliver Marach were the defending champions; however, they lost to Santiago González and Máximo González in the quarterfinals.
Victor Hănescu and Horia Tecău won the final against Marcelo Melo and Bruno Soares 6–1, 6–3.

== Seeds ==
1. (United States) Bob Bryan / (United States) Mike Bryan (first round)
2. (Poland) Łukasz Kubot / (Austria) Oliver Marach (quarterfinals)
3. (The Bahamas) Mark Knowles / (Slovakia) Michal Mertiňák (first round)
4. (Brazil) Marcelo Melo / (Brazil) Bruno Soares (final)

== Draw ==
Key

- Q = Qualifier
- WC = Wild card
- LL = Lucky loser
- Alt = Alternate
- ITF = ITF entry
- PR = Protected ranking
- SR = Special ranking
- SE = Special exempt
- JE = Junior exempt
- JR = Junior Accelerator Programme entrant
- CO = College Accelerator Programme entrant
- NG = Next Gen Accelerator Program entrant
- w/o = Walkover
- r = Retired
- d = Defaulted

=== Draw ===
First round
1	(United States) B Bryan (United States) M Bryan	1	6^{2}
(United States) T Parrott (Slovakia) F Polášek	6	7
(Uruguay) P Cuevas (Argentina) J Mónaco	3	4
(Italy) D Bracciali (Italy) P Starace	6	6
3	(The Bahamas) M Knowles (Slovakia) M Mertiňák	6^{8}	1
(Romania) V Hănescu (Romania) H Tecău	7	6
(Czech Republic) F Čermák (Italy) F Fognini	6	7
(Spain) D Marrero (Spain) F Verdasco	4	6^{5}
(Argentina) C Berlocq (Ukraine) A Dolgopolov	3	7	[7]
(Spain) N Almagro (Spain) R Ramírez Hidalgo	6	6^{1}	[10]
(Argentina) E Schwank (Argentina) H Zeballos	2	1
4	(Brazil) M Melo (Brazil) B Soares	6	6
WC	(Mexico) L Díaz-Barriga (Mexico) MÁ Reyes-Varela	6	2	[6]
WC	(Mexico) S González (Argentina) M González	4	6	[10]
(Spain) D Gimeno-Traver (Spain) A Montañés	3	0
2	(Poland) Ł Kubot (Austria) O Marach	6	6

Quarterfinals
(United States) T Parrott (Slovakia) F Polášek	6	6
(Italy) D Bracciali (Italy) P Starace	1	4
(Romania) V Hănescu (Romania) H Tecău	6	6
(Czech Republic) F Čermák (Italy) F Fognini	3	3
(Spain) N Almagro (Spain) R Ramírez Hidalgo	1	2
4	(Brazil) M Melo (Brazil) B Soares	6	6
WC	(Mexico) S González (Argentina) M González	7	6
2	(Poland) Ł Kubot (Austria) O Marach	5	1

Semifinals
(United States) T Parrott (Slovakia) F Polášek	6	3	[4]
(Romania) V Hănescu (Romania) H Tecău	3	6	[10]
4	(Brazil) M Melo (Brazil) B Soares	6	6
WC	(Mexico) S González (Argentina) M González	4	2

Final
(Romania) V Hănescu (Romania) H Tecău	6	6
4	(Brazil) M Melo (Brazil) B Soares	1	3
