= Polona Hercog =

Slovenian tennis player (born 1991)

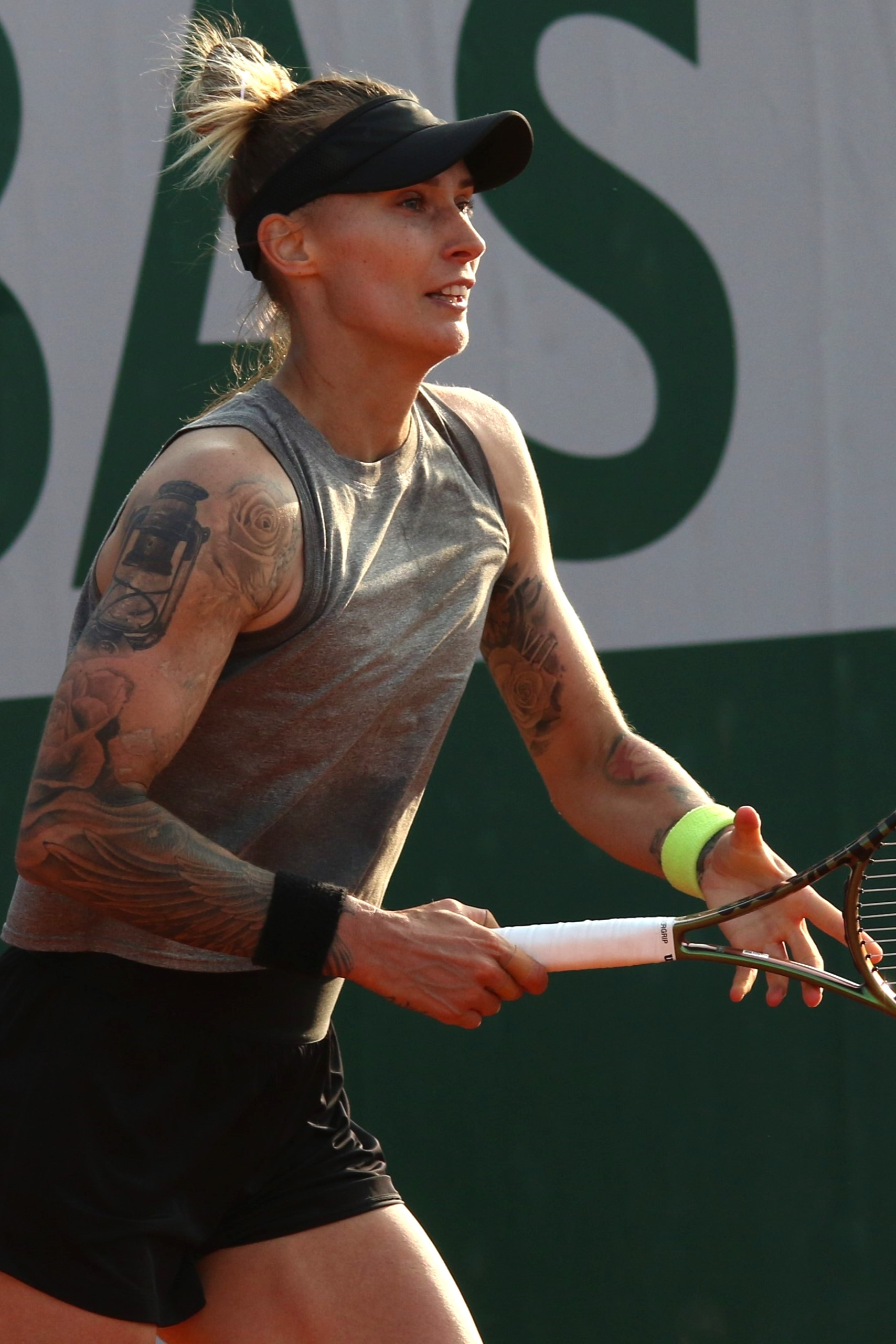
- Hercog at the 2023 French Open
- Country (sports): Slovenia
- Residence: Doha, Qatar
- Born: 20 January 1991 (age 35) Maribor, SR Slovenia, SFR Yugoslavia
- Height: 1.85 m (6 ft 1 in)
- Turned pro: 2006
- Plays: Right (two-handed backhand)
- Prize money: US$ 4,550,360

Singles
- Career record: 523–366
- Career titles: 3
- Highest ranking: No. 35 (12 September 2011)
- Current ranking: No. 236 (24 August 2026)

Grand Slam singles results
- Australian Open: 2R (2010, 2015, 2020)
- French Open: 3R (2010, 2019, 2021)
- Wimbledon: 3R (2017, 2019)
- US Open: 2R (2011, 2014, 2015)

Other tournaments
- Olympic Games: 1R (2012, 2016)

Doubles
- Career record: 77–78
- Career titles: 2
- Highest ranking: No. 56 (31 January 2011)

Grand Slam doubles results
- Australian Open: 3R (2012)
- French Open: 2R (2021)
- Wimbledon: 1R (2010)
- US Open: 3R (2010, 2013)

Team competitions
- Fed Cup: 12–9
- Last updated on: 8 September 2026.

Polona Hercog (Slovene pronunciation: [pɔˈlóːna ˈxèːɾtsɔk], born 20 January 1991) is a Slovenian professional tennis player. Her career-high WTA rankings are world No. 35 in singles and No. 56 in doubles. She has won five titles on the WTA Tour, three in singles and two in doubles. Hercog also has had success on the ITF Women's Circuit, winning 19 singles and five doubles titles.

Partnering with Jessica Moore, she won the French Open and Wimbledon junior titles in the doubles competition in 2008.

== Early and personal life ==
Hercog was born in Maribor, Slovenia, to florist Romana and bar owner Vojko. As a four-year-old she began playing in the local tennis clinic opened by Mima Jaušovec, and at age 14 moved to Italy to train professionally. Hercog is fluent in Slovenian, English, and Italian, and cites Justine Henin as her role model. She currently resides in Doha, Qatar and practises in Budapest.

== Career ==
In September 2007, Hercog received a wildcard and made her WTA Tour debut at the Slovenia Open, losing to Elena Vesnina in three sets.

=== 2008: Juniors doubles majors & first ITF Circuit titles ===
Hercog reached the singles quarterfinals at both the junior French Open and Wimbledon. In doubles, she and Australian Jessica Moore won two Grand Slam titles together, the French Open and Wimbledon; the latter was the final tournament of her junior career. On 7 July, Hercog achieved a career-high ITF junior ranking of No. 8.

In early 2008, she also won two ITF titles ($10k) and reached the final of a $25k event. Hercog then participated in the İstanbul Cup, coming through qualifying to reach the main draw, where she lost in the first round to eighth seed Tsvetana Pironkova. At the same tournament, she reached the final of the doubles competition partnering with New Zealand's Marina Erakovic. Ranked No. 215, she made her Grand Slam debut in the qualifying competition of the US Open, losing to Sandra Záhlavová in the first round.

=== 2009 ===
In April 2009, Hercog entered the Morocco Open in Fez via qualifying, defeating seventh seed Roberta Vinci to reach the quarterfinals, where she lost to second seed Alisa Kleybanova. At that year's French Open, she qualified for the main draw and upset 23rd seed Kleybanova before losing to Aravane Rezaï in the second round. On 5 July, she debuted in the top 100 of the rankings for the first time at No. 89. At the US Open, Hercog was beaten by American wildcard Christina McHale in the first round. She also played the Luxembourg Open, defeating Maria Elena Camerin in the opening round. She then lost to Sabine Lisicki in two sets. Hercog reached the second round of the 2009 Allianz Cup in Sofia, losing to Bojana Jovanovski.

=== 2010 ===
Hercog began her season at the Auckland Open where she lost to Shahar Pe'er in the first round.

At the Mexican Open in Acapulco, Hercog reached her first WTA Tour singles final and won her first WTA doubles title. She defeated Rossana de los Ríos in the first round, Alizé Cornet in the second, Ágnes Szávay retired from the quarterfinals match when Hercog was leading by a set, and Carla Suárez Navarro in two sets in the semifinals. In the final, she lost to top seed and former world No. 1, Venus Williams, despite winning the first set. Partnering with Barbora Záhlavová-Strýcová, she won her first tour doubles title, beating the Italian duo Sara Errani and Roberta Vinci.

At the Indian Wells Open, Hercog defeated Raluca Olaru in the first round and was defeated by 11th seed Marion Bartoli in the second round. She caused an upset in the second round of the French Open by defeating No. 24, Lucie Šafářová.

In Portorož, she reached the semifinals, was up a set against Anna Chakvetadze but then lost the match in three sets. Seeded sixth at the Danish Open in Copenhagen, she had a chance to take revenge on Anna Chakvetadze as they met in the quarterfinals. Hercog lost the match, this time in straight sets.

=== 2011 ===
Hercog began the year at the Brisbane International where she lost in the first round to Iveta Benešová in two sets. Seeded second in qualifying at the Sydney International, Hercog lost in the first round to Jill Craybas. At the Australian Open, she lost in the first round in a close match to world No. 46, Anastasija Sevastova.

After the Australian Open, Hercog played at the 2011 Fed Cup World Group II against Germany. She defeated Julia Görges, however, she lost to Andrea Petkovic in straight sets. Slovenia lost to Germany 1–4. Seeded second at the Copa Colsanitas, she defeated Pauline Parmentier in the first round. In the second round, she lost to Petra Martić. Seeded second at the Abierto Mexicano, Hercog lost in the first round to Lourdes Domínguez Lino. She then stayed in Mexico for the Monterrey Open. Seeded eighth, Hercog defeated Angelique Kerber in the first round 6–3, 6–3. She then reached the semifinals where she lost to top seed Jelena Janković in two sets. At the Indian Wells Open, Hercog lost in the first round to Anastasija Sevastova. At the Miami Open, she lost in the first round to Chanelle Scheepers in three sets.

Hercog began her clay-court season at the Andalucia Tennis Experience. She lost in the first round to Laura Pous Tió, 1–6, 2–6. Next, Hercog played at the Morocco Open where she got revenge on Chanelle Scheepers by defeating her in the first round. However, she withdrew from her second-round match against Melanie Oudin due to an ankle injury. At the Barcelona Open, Hercog won her first-round match against lucky loser Jamie Hampton. In the second round, she easily beat Mirjana Lučić. In the quarterfinals, she lost to Laura Pous Tió in three sets.

=== 2012 ===
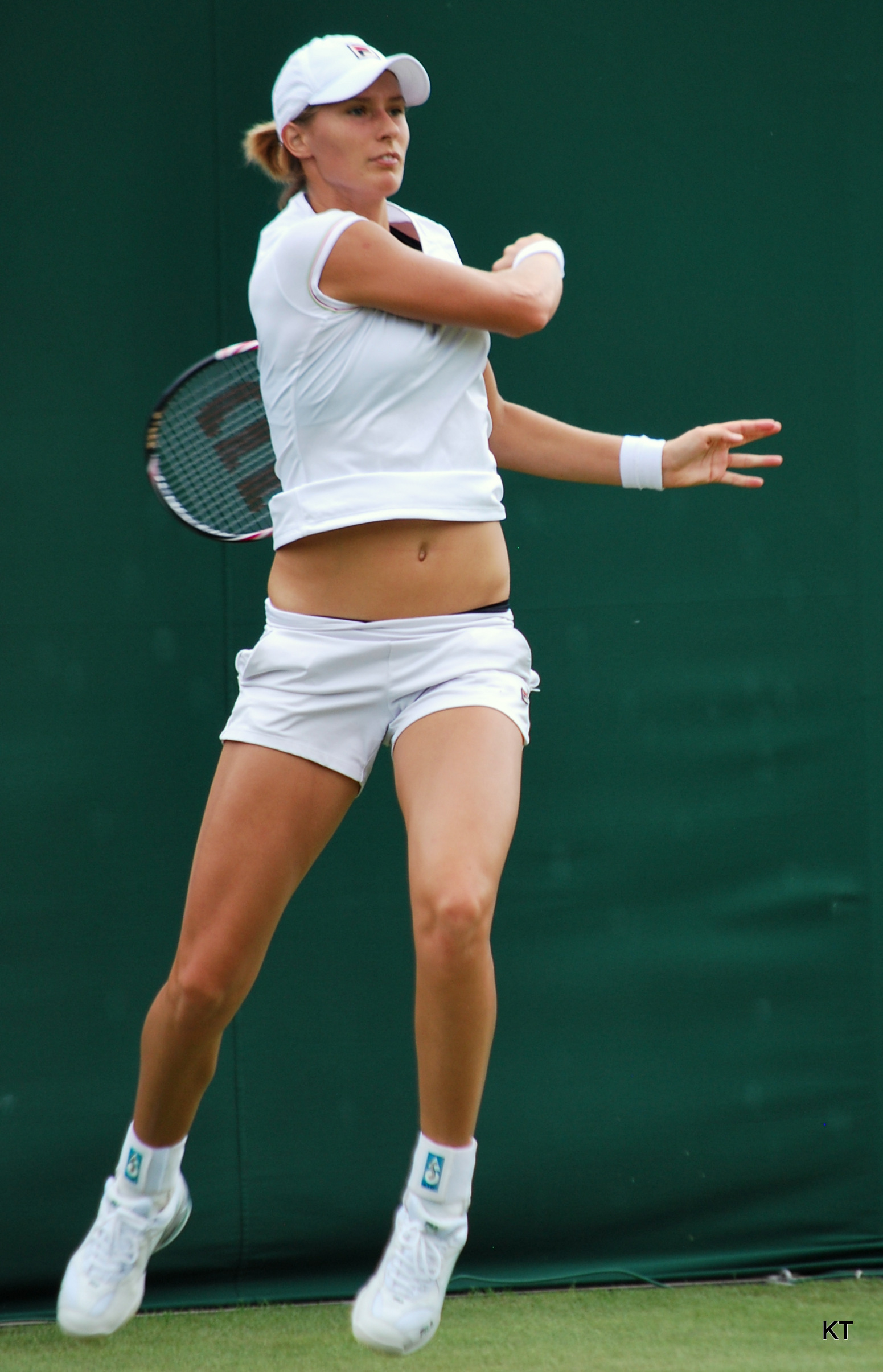
Hercog at the 2012 Wimbledon Championships

Hercog began the year at the Brisbane International. She retired trailing 6–1, 4–1 in her first-round match against seventh seed Anastasia Pavlyuchenkova due to a low back injury. Seeded third in qualifying at the Sydney International, Hercog lost in the final round of qualifying to seventh seed Ekaterina Makarova. However, she received a lucky loser spot into the main draw. In the first round, Hercog lost to eighth seed Marion Bartoli. At the Australian Open, she lost in the first round to 22nd seed Julia Görges.

After the Australian Open, Hercog represented Slovenia for Fed Cup against Japan. She lost both of her rubbers to Kimiko Date-Krumm and Ayumi Morita. Japan went on to defeat Slovenia 5–0. At the Open GDF Suez, Hercog lost in the first round to Chanelle Scheepers in straight sets. She suffered another first-round loss at the Qatar Open to Tsvetana Pironkova. Seeded second for qualifying at the Dubai Championships, she lost in the final round of qualifying to Aleksandra Wozniak. Entering the main draw as a lucky loser, Hercog lost in the first round to world No. 21, Daniela Hantuchová. Ranked 38 at the Indian Wells Open, she lost in the first round to wildcard Jamie Hampton, 0–6, 1–6. At the Sony Ericsson Open, Hercog got revenge on qualifier Jamie Hampton defeating her in the first round 6–1, 6–3. In the second, she lost to seventh seed Marion Bartoli.

Hercog began her clay-court season at Charleston. Seeded 14th, she beat Kimiko Date-Krumm in the first round and American Varvara Lepchenko in the second. In the third round, Hercog upset third seed Marion Bartoli. and in the quarterfinals, 13th seed Nadia Petrova, 6–1, 6–2 to reach the semifinals where she was crushed by ninth seed Lucie Šafářová, 6–0, 6–0. Seeded eighth at the Barcelona Ladies Open, Hercog retired in her first round match against Sorana Cîrstea after losing the first set 4–6 due to dizziness. Seeded ninth at the Estoril Open, she defeated Tamira Paszek in the first round 6–0, 6–3. In the second round, Hercog retired trailing 6–4, 3–0 to Carla Suárez Navarro due to a right foot injury. Ranked 37 at the Madrid Open, Hercog lost in the first round to Shahar Pe'er 3–6, 5–7. At the French Open, she was defeated in the first round by Ayumi Morita.

At Wimbledon, Hercog lost in the first round to qualifier Kristýna Plíšková.

After that, she competed at Palermo where she was upset in the first round by Irina-Camelia Begu. Hercog then played at the Swedish Open as the defending champion and prevailed again, defeating Mathilde Johansson in the final. Representing Slovenia at the London Olympics, Hercog was defeated in the first round by María José Martínez Sánchez.

She played one warm-up tournament before the US Open. At the Texas Open. She faced Kiki Bertens in the first round, and won the first set 6–4 when Bertens retired due to a right abdominal injury. In the second round, she lost to third seed and eventual champion Roberta Vinci. At the US Open, Hercog was defeated in the first round by fifth seed Petra Kvitová.

At the Korea Open, she lost in the first round to eighth seed Ekaterina Makarova. Seeded 11th for qualifying at the Pan Pacific Open, Hercog lost in the first round of qualifying to wildcard Kurumi Nara. She qualified for the China Open beating 17th seed Mathilde Johansson and Gréta Arn. In round one, Hercog led 5–7, 6–4, 3–0 before Anastasia Pavlyuchenkova retired due to a gastrointestinal illness. In the second round, she defeated Ekaterina Makarova in a very close match. In the third round, Hercog lost to second seed and eventual finalist Maria Sharapova. Her final tournament of the year was at the Osaka Open. She lost in the first round to eventual champion Heather Watson.

Hercog ended the year ranked No. 80.

=== 2013 ===
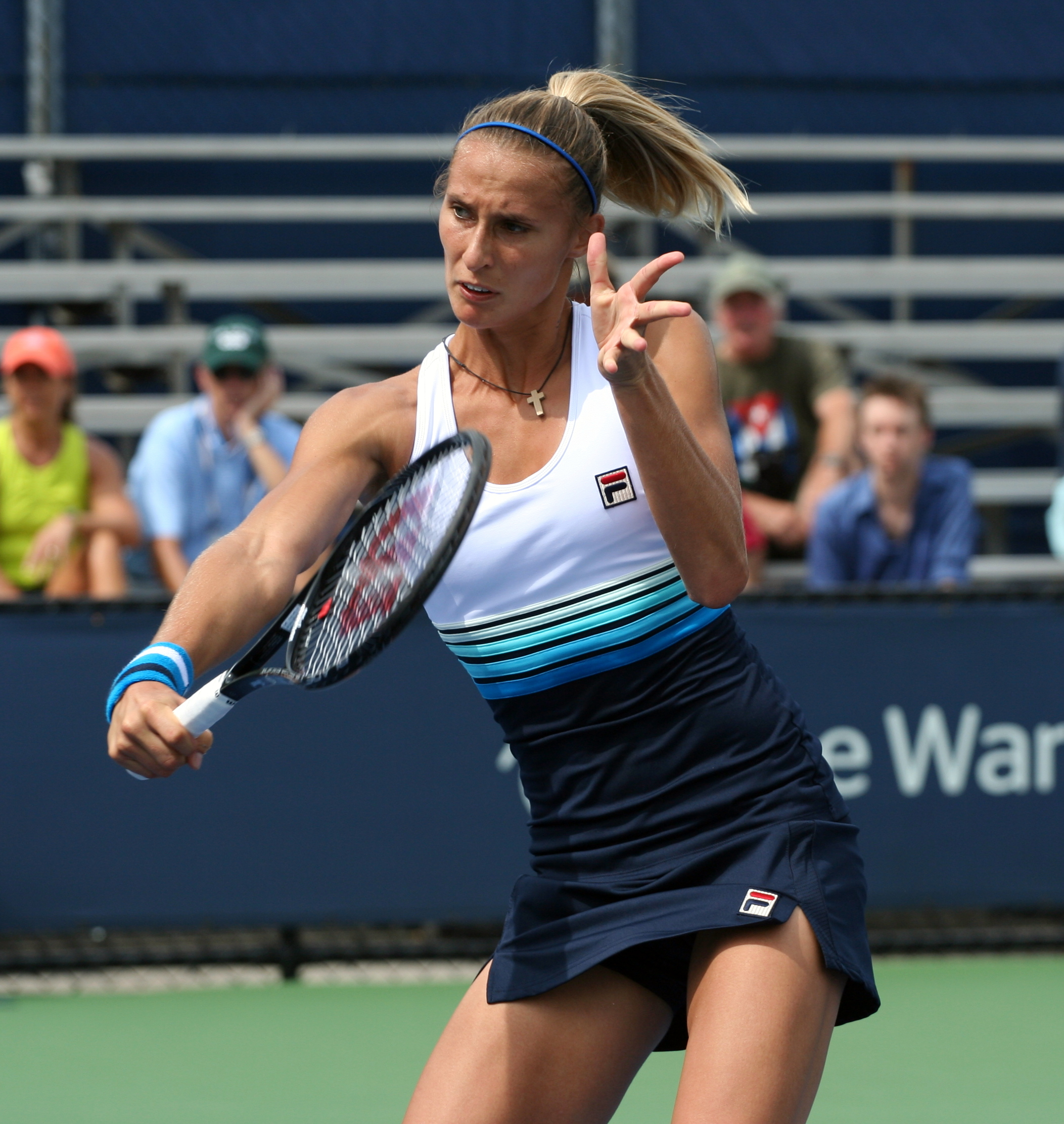
Hercog at the 2013 US Open

At the Australian Open, she was defeated in the first round by 21st seed Varvara Lepchenko.

Seeded 17th for qualifying at the French Open, she beat Ajla Tomljanović in the first round of qualifying, but in the second round she lost to Grace Min. After the French Open, Hercog played the 25k-tournament in Maribor, Slovenia. As the top seed, she won the tournament defeating Ana Konjuh in the final. At the 100k-tournament in Marseille, she was defeated in the semifinals by top seed Anabel Medina Garrigues. Competing at the first edition of the Nürnberger Versicherungscup, Hercog upset second seed Klára Zakopalová in the first round. In the second round, she beat Julia Cohen in two sets. In the quarterfinals, Hercog was defeated by fifth seed Lucie Šafářová.

Seeded fourth for qualifying at Wimbledon, Hercog lost in the second round of qualifying to Petra Cetkovská.

At Palermo, she was defeated in the second round by second seed Roberta Vinci. Hercog won the ITS Cup as the top seed beating Katarzyna Piter in the final. Seeded sixth at the Baku Cup, Hercog lost in the first round to Galina Voskoboeva.

Hercog qualified for the Cincinnati Open defeating ninth seed Lourdes Domínguez Lino in the final round of qualifying. In the first round, she beat world No. 19, Dominika Cibulková, 6–2, 6–4. In the second round, Hercog lost to sixth seed Sara Errani. At the US Open, Hercog was defeated in the first round by 24th seed Ekaterina Makarova.

At the Challenge Bell, she stunned top seed and defending champion Kirsten Flipkens in the first round 6–3, 6–1. In the second round, she beat qualifier Julie Coin 6–0, 6–2. In the quarterfinals, Hercog lost to Christina McHale. Hercog qualified for the Pan Pacific Open beating ninth seed Tsvetana Pironkova in the final round of qualifying. In the first round, she was defeated in a close match by world No. 35, Lucie Šafářová. Qualifying for the China Open, Hercog beat Monica Puig in the first round 6–1, 6–4. In the second round, Hercog upset 14th seed and former world No. 1, Ana Ivanovic. In the third round, she lost to third seed Agnieszka Radwańska. Her final tournament of the year was the Japan Open. In the first round, she beat Petra Cetkovská, and received a walkover in the second round since her opponent, second seed Sabine Lisicki, withdrew due to a hip injury. In the quarterfinals, Hercog was defeated by Kurumi Nara.

She ended the year ranked world No. 66.

=== 2014 ===
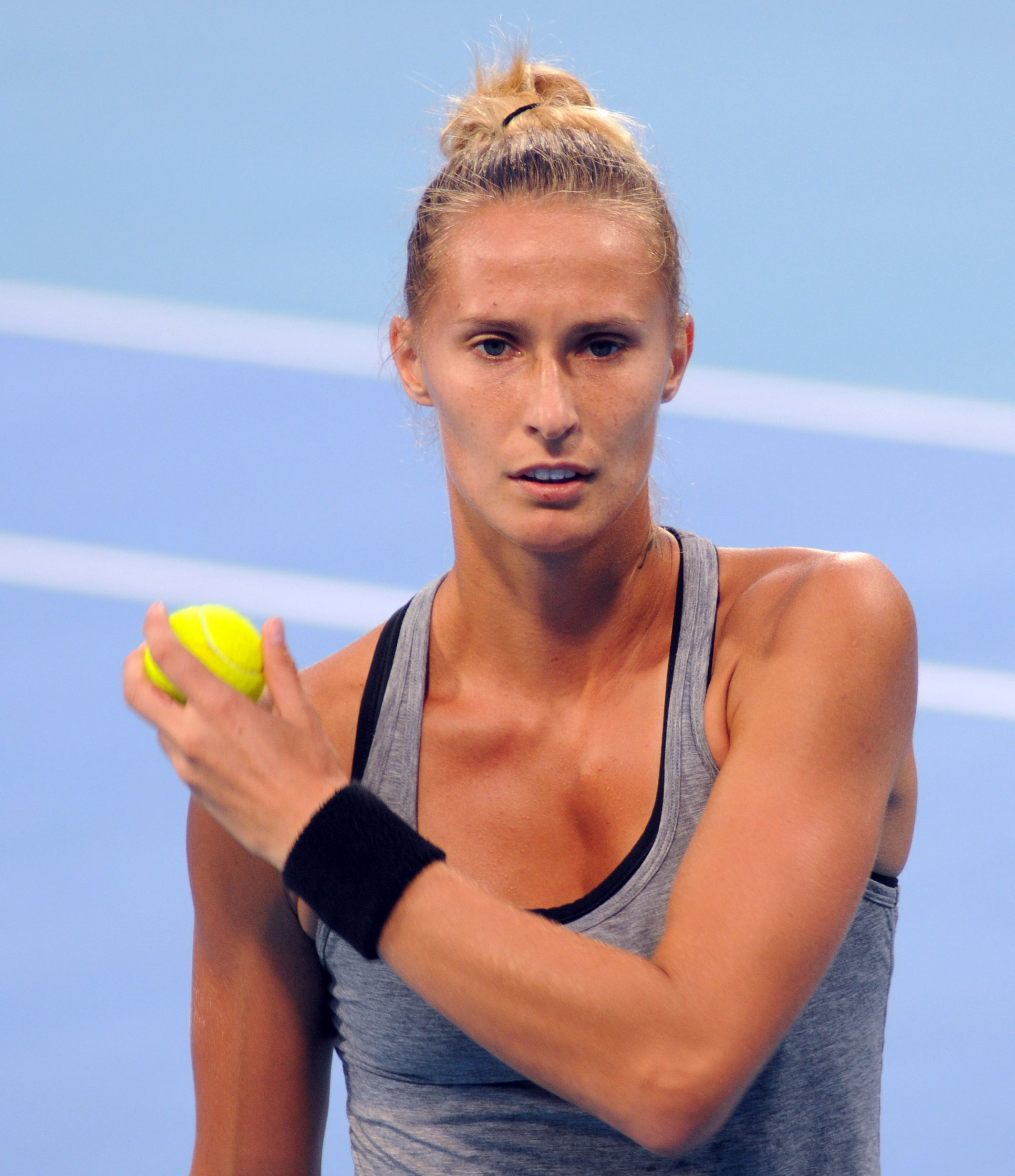
Hercog at the 2014 China Open

Hercog began her season at the Australian Open. In the first round, she was up against 25th seed Alizé Cornet. Hercog retired trailing 1–0 due to a shoulder injury.

Hercog made her comeback during the clay-court season at the Morocco Open. In the first round, she upset Zhang Shuai 6–2, 6–2. In the second round, she defeated Alison Van Uytvanck 6–1, 6–4. Hercog was then stopped in the quarterfinals by eventual champion María Teresa Torró Flor in two tie-breakers. At the Portugal Open, she beat Stefanie Vögele in the first round. In the second round, she upset sixth seed Lucie Šafářová. Hercog lost in the quarterfinals to top seed and eventual champion, Carla Suárez Navarro. Seeded sixth for qualifying at the Italian Open, Hercog lost in the first round of qualifying to Belinda Bencic. Her final tournament before the French Open was the Nürnberger Versicherungscup. In the first round, she upset third seed Klára Koukalová in three sets. In the second round, Hercog lost to Karin Knapp. At the French Open, she defeated Jana Čepelová in the first round In the second round, Hercog was defeated by 15th seed Sloane Stephens 6–1, 6–3.

Hercog played only one grass-court tournament before Wimbledon. She lost in the first round at Rosmalen to sixth seed Kirsten Flipkens. At Wimbledon, she won her first round match over Paula Ormaechea. In the second round, she was defeated by 23rd seed Lucie Šafářová.

After Wimbledon, Hercog competed at the first edition of the Bucharest Open. Seeded eighth in the draw, she defeated Anna Tatishvili in the first round. In the second round, she beat Katarzyna Piter. In the quarterfinals, Hercog lost to Monica Niculescu. Seeded eighth at the Swedish Open, she lost in the first round to Dinah Pfizenmaier.

Hercog began the US Open Series at the Washington Open. She lost in the first round to sixth seed and eventual champion Svetlana Kuznetsova. Seeded 20th for qualifying at the Cincinnati Open, Hercog reached the main draw beating Paula Ormaechea and Julia Glushko. In the first round, she was defeated by Kirsten Flipkens, 6–3, 6–2. At the Connecticut Open, her final tournament before the US Open, Hercog lost in the second round of qualifying to Karin Knapp, 2–6, 1–6. Ranked 76 at the US Open, she defeated world No. 35, Elina Svitolina, in the first round in two sets. In the second round, she lost to 17th seed Ekaterina Makarova.

After the US Open, Hercog played at the first edition of the Hong Kong Open. She lost in the first round to third seed and eventual finalist, Karolína Plíšková. At the Korea Open, Hercog was defeated in the first round by top seed and defending champion Agnieszka Radwańska. Seeded 18th for qualifying at the first edition of the Wuhan Open, she lost in the first round of qualifying to Nicole Gibbs. Seeded 11th for qualifying at the China Open, Hercog qualified by defeating Yulia Putintseva and seventh seed Monica Puig. In the first round, she beat world No. 29, Karolína Plíšková. In the second round, Hercog lost to 12th seed Ekaterina Makarova. Seeded second for qualifying at the Generali Ladies Linz, she lost in the first round of qualifying to Lucie Hradecká. Her final tournament of the year was at the Luxembourg Open. She won her first-round match over Marina Erakovic 6–3, 6–4. Then Hercog was defeated by qualifier Johanna Larsson.

She ended the year ranked No. 95.

=== 2015 ===
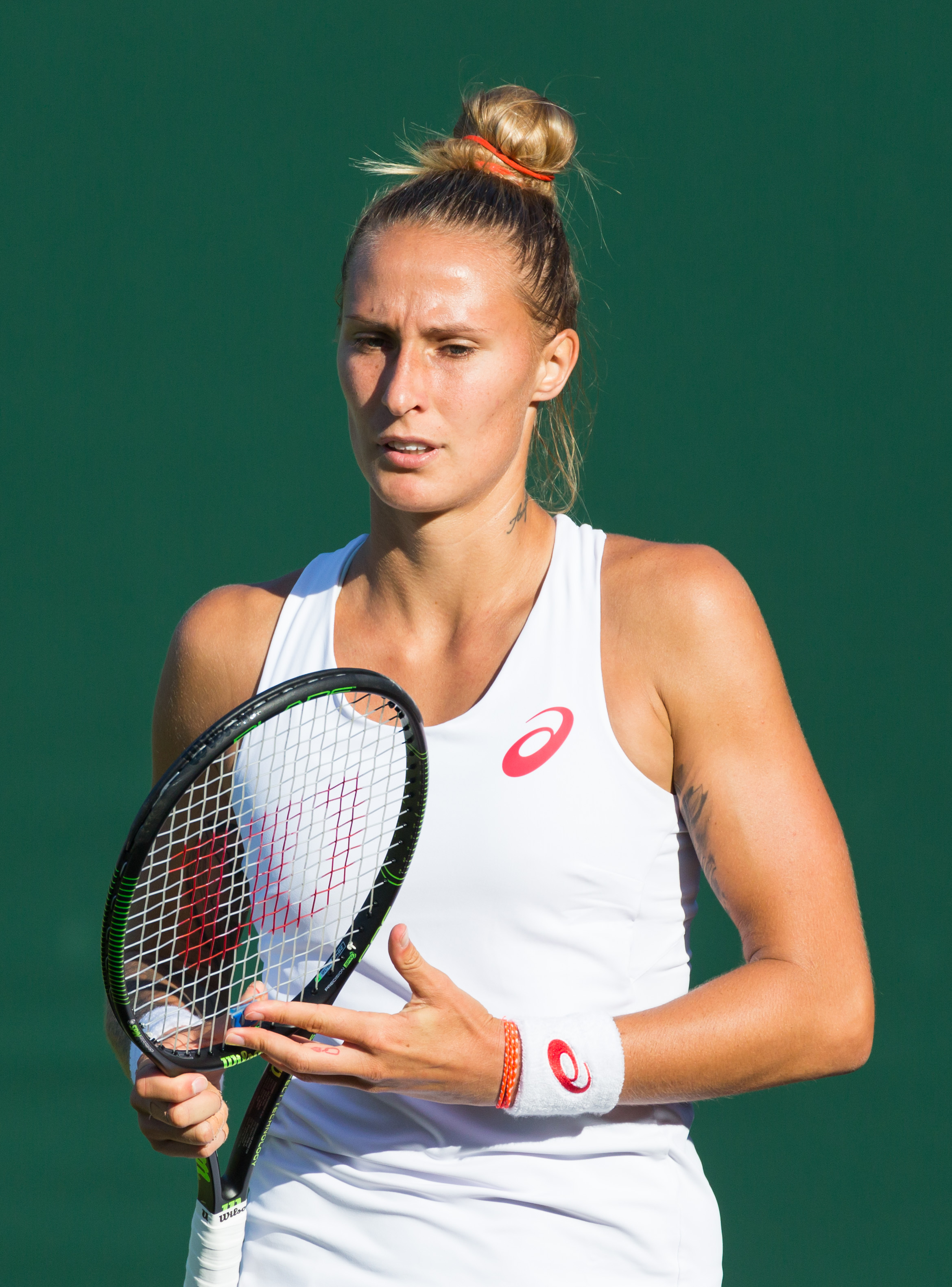
Hercog at the 2015 Wimbledon Championships

Hercog started the year at the Shenzhen Open where she lost to Zheng Saisai in the second round. Coming through qualifying at the Sydney International, Hercog was defeated in the first round by Karolína Plíšková. At the Australian Open, she lost in the second round to qualifier Lucie Hradecká.

Seeded seventh at the Rio Open, Hercog was defeated in the second round by Brazilian wildcard Beatriz Haddad Maia. Playing in Acapulco at the Mexican Open, she lost in the first round to third seed and eventual finalist Caroline Garcia. Hercog stayed in Mexico to compete at the Monterrey Open. She was defeated in the second round by eighth seed Magdaléna Rybáriková. Hercog had multiple match points in the third set but failed to convert. Getting past qualifying at the Indian Wells Open, Hercog beat 2009 champion Vera Zvonareva in the first round. She lost in the second round to 25th seed Caroline Garcia. At the Miami Open, Hercog was defeated in the first round by Anna Karolína Schmiedlová. In Poland at the Katowice Open, Hercog lost in the second round to second seed and defending champion Alizé Cornet.

=== 2016 ===
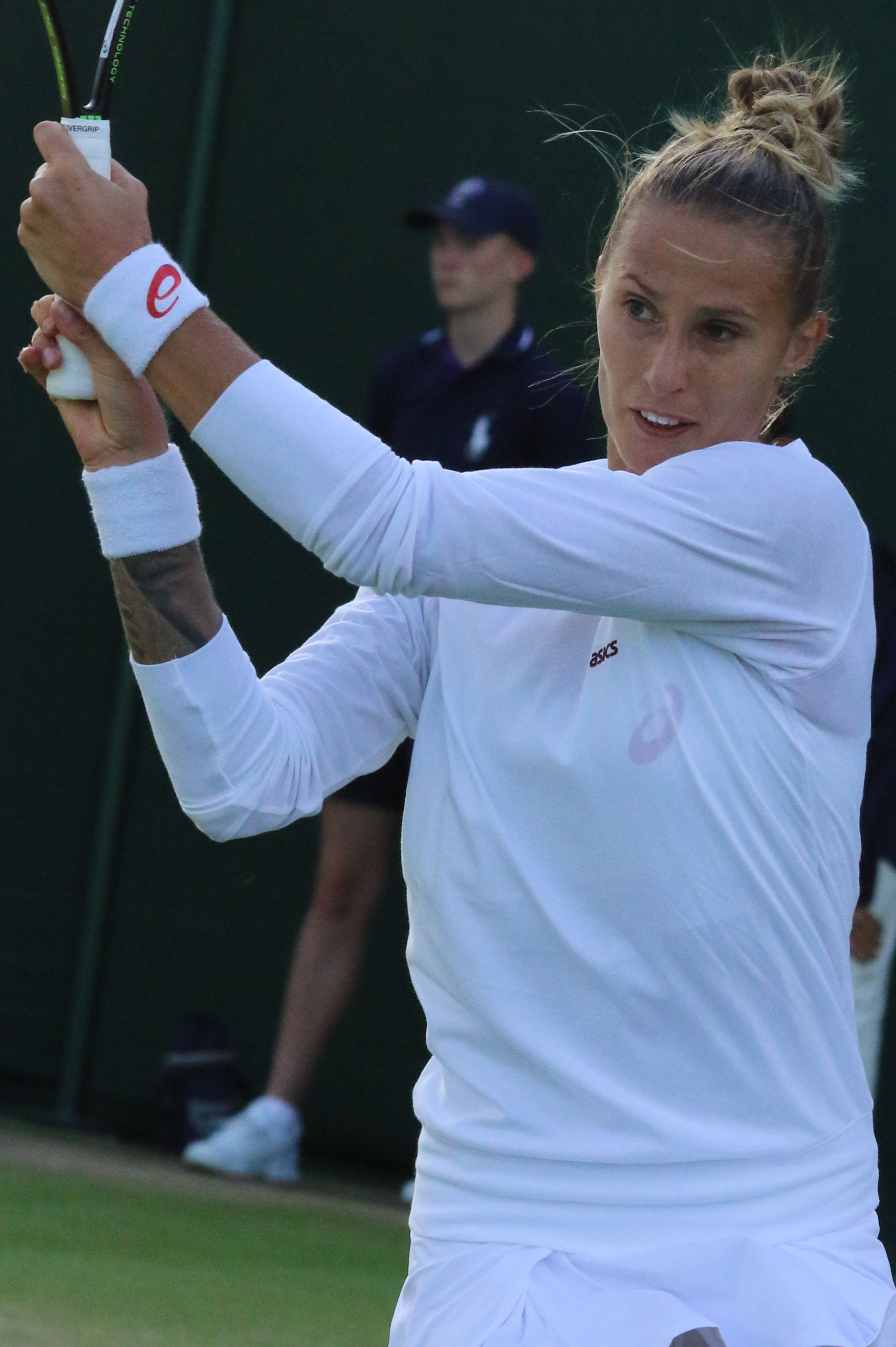
Hercog at the 2016 Wimbledon Championships

Hercog began the year at Auckland where she lost in the first round to fifth seed and eventual champion, Sloane Stephens. In Sydney, she was defeated in the final round of qualifying by Monica Puig. However, she was awarded a lucky loser spot into the main draw. She lost in the first round to Sabine Lisicki. At the Australian Open, she was defeated in the first round by 19th seed Jelena Janković.

Seeded fifth at the Rio Open, Hercog lost in the second round to Sorana Cîrstea. Playing at the Mexican Open, she was defeated in the first round by top seed Victoria Azarenka. At the Monterrey Open, she lost in the second round to eventual champion Heather Watson. Competing in Indian Wells, she was defeated in the first round by Yanina Wickmayer. At the Miami Open, she retired during her first round of qualifying match against Fanny Stollár.

Hercog began her clay-court season at the Stuttgart Grand Prix. She lost in the final round of qualifying to German Laura Siegemund. At the Morocco Open, she was defeated in the first round by fifth seed and last year finalist Tímea Babos. In Madrid, she lost in the first round of qualifying to Madison Brengle. At the Italian Open, she was defeated in the first round of qualifying by Julia Görges. Her final tournament before the French Open was at Nürnberg where she lost in the second round to fourth seed Lesia Tsurenko. At the French Open, she was defeated in the second round by 30th seed Barbora Strýcová.

Seeded seventh at the Bol Ladies Open, Hercog reached the final which she lost to Mandy Minella.

Beginning her grass-court season at the Rosmalen Open, Hercog retired during her first-round match against Varvara Lepchenko. Coming through qualifying at the Eastbourne International, she was defeated in the first round by Misaki Doi. At the Wimbledon Championships, she lost in the first round to Alizé Cornet.

Competing at the Bucharest Open, Hercog made it to the quarterfinals where she was defeated by fourth seed Laura Siegemund. At the Swedish Open, she fell in the first round to Julia Görges. Representing Slovenia at the Rio Olympics, she lost in the first round to eventual gold medalist Monica Puig.

At the US Open, Hercog faced second seed Angelique Kerber in the first round. She retired from the match due to illness.

Due to not playing for the rest of the year, Hercog ended the year ranked 139.

=== 2017 ===
She returned to the tour for her first tournament since the 2016 US Open at the French Open. where she beat French wildcard Harmony Tan in the first round of qualifying. However, in the second round, Hercog lost to Zarina Diyas. At a $25k tournament in Grado, she lost in the first round to Diāna Marcinkēviča. Seeded seventh at the Internazionali di Brescia, she won the title, defeating Ganna Poznikhirenko in the final in two sets.

=== 2019 ===
Hercog began the year at the Auckland Open. She lost in the first round to third seed Hsieh Su-wei. In Hobart, she was defeated in the first round of qualifying by Olivia Rogowska. At the Australian Open, she lost in the first round to second seed and 2016 champion, Angelique Kerber.

As the top seed at the Andrézieux-Bouthéon Open, Hercog reached the semifinals where she retired after losing the first set against Rebecca Šramková. In Doha, she was defeated in the final round of qualifying by Ajla Tomljanović. However, due to the withdrawal of Ashleigh Barty, she entered the main draw as a lucky loser. In the first round, she lost to fellow lucky loser Alison Riske. At the Dubai Championships, she fell in the final round of qualifying to Lucie Hradecká. Since Caroline Wozniacki withdrew from the tournament due to a viral illness, she got a lucky loser spot in the main draw. She was defeated in the first round by lucky loser Stefanie Vögele. In March, she played at the Miami Open. Even though she lost in the final round of qualifying to Laura Siegemund, she still entered the main draw as a lucky loser. She reached the third round where she was eliminated by second seed Simona Halep.

Hercog won her third WTA singles title at the Ladies Open Lugano, defeating Iga Świątek in the final.

=== 2020 ===
Hercog kicked off the season at the Australian Open, where she lost in the second round to top seed Ashleigh Barty.

Playing at the Dubai Championships, she was defeated in the final round of qualifying by Kristina Mladenovic. In Doha, she lost in the first round to Alison Van Uytvanck. The WTA suspended tournaments from March through July due to the COVID-19 pandemic.

When the WTA resumed tournaments in August, Hercog competed at the Palermo Ladies Open. She was defeated in the first round by Italian wildcard Elisabetta Cocciaretto. At the Prague Open, she lost in a tight three-set first-round match to top seed and eventual champion, Simona Halep. She skipped both the Cincinnati Open and the US Open.

Seeded third at the İstanbul Cup, Hercog reached the quarterfinals where she was defeated by Paula Badosa. In Rome, she upset fifth seed Kiki Bertens in the second round. She fell in the third round to 12th seed Markéta Vondroušová. At the Internationaux de Strasbourg, she lost in the first round to 2013 champion Alizé Cornet. At the French Open, she was defeated in the second round by Leylah Fernandez.

Hercog played her final tournament of the season at the Dubai Tennis Challenge. Seeded second, she made it to the semifinal where she lost to Sorana Cîrstea.

Hercog ended the year ranked No. 52.

=== 2021 ===
Hercog started her season at the first edition of the Abu Dhabi Open where she lost in the first round to fourth seed and eventual champion, Aryna Sabalenka. Seeded 15th at the first edition of the Gippsland Trophy, she was defeated in the second round by Daria Kasatkina. At the Australian Open, she lost in the first round to Caroline Garcia.

Competing in Dubai, Hercog was defeated in the first round by lucky loser Misaki Doi.

As the top seed at the Oeiras Ladies Open, Hercog won the title when her opponent, fifth seed Clara Burel, withdrew from the match due to a left ankle injury.

At the İstanbul Cup, she lost in the first round to Vera Zvonareva. Despite losing in the final round of qualifying at the Madrid Open to Bernarda Pera, she still received a lucky loser spot into the main draw due to the withdrawal of Svetlana Kuznetsova. She was defeated in the first round by Jeļena Ostapenko. Getting past qualifying in Rome, she lost in the first round to 17th seed Maria Sakkari. At the first edition of the Serbia Open, she was defeated in the first round by Leylah Fernandez. At the French Open, she beat 16th seed and 2016 semifinalist, Kiki Bertens, in the first round. She ended up losing in the third round to 20th seed and 2019 finalist, Markéta Vondroušová.

At the Birmingham Classic, Hercog was defeated in the first round by fourth seed and eventual finalist, Daria Kasatkina. In Eastbourne, she fell in the first round of qualifying to Zhang Shuai. At Wimbledon, she lost in the first round to Danielle Collins. She also lost in the first round at the US Open, to tenth seed Petra Kvitová. Finally, she lost in the first round of the Indian Wells Open to Anastasija Sevastova, making her win–loss record 4–14 for the season, the worst in her 15-year professional career.

Hercog ended the year ranked No. 135.

== Performance timelines ==
Key
W	F	SF	QF	#R	RR	Q#	P#	DNQ	A	Z#	PO	G	S	B	NMS	NTI	P	NH

(W) winner; (F) finalist; (SF) semifinalist; (QF) quarterfinalist; (#R) rounds 4, 3, 2, 1; (RR) round-robin stage; (Q#) qualification round; (P#) preliminary round; (DNQ) did not qualify; (A) absent; (Z#) Davis/Fed Cup Zonal Group (with number indication) or (PO) play-off; (G) gold, (S) silver or (B) bronze Olympic/Paralympic medal; (NMS) not a Masters tournament; (NTI) not a Tier I tournament; (P) postponed; (NH) not held; (SR) strike rate (events won / competed); (W–L) win–loss record.
To avoid confusion and double counting, these charts are updated at the conclusion of a tournament or when the player's participation has ended.

Only main-draw results in WTA Tour, Grand Slam tournaments, Billie Jean King Cup /Fed Cup and Olympic Games are included in win–loss records.

=== Singles ===
Current through the 2023 US Open.

Tournament	2007	2008	2009	2010	2011	2012	2013	2014	2015	2016	2017	2018	2019	2020	2021	2022	2023	SR	W–L	Win %
Grand Slam tournaments
Australian Open	A	A	A	2R	1R	1R	1R	1R	2R	1R	A	1R	1R	2R	1R	A	A	0 / 11	3–11	21%
French Open	A	A	2R	3R	2R	1R	Q2	2R	2R	2R	Q2	1R	3R	2R	3R	A	Q2	0 / 11	12–11	52%
Wimbledon	A	A	Q2	1R	2R	1R	Q2	2R	1R	1R	3R	1R	3R	NH	1R	A	Q1	0 / 10	6–10	38%
US Open	A	Q1	1R	1R	2R	1R	1R	2R	2R	1R	Q2	1R	1R	A	1R	A	A	0 / 11	3–11	21%
Win–loss	0–0	0–0	1–2	3–4	3–4	0–4	0–2	3–4	3–4	1–4	2–1	0–4	4–4	2–2	2–4	0–0	0–0	0 / 43	24–43	36%
National representation
Summer Olympics	NH	A	NH			1R	NH			1R	NH				A	NH	A	0 / 2	0–2	0%
WTA 1000
Dubai / Qatar Open (Note: The first Premier 5 event of the year has switched back and forth between the Dubai Tennis Championships and the Qatar Ladies Open since 2009. Dubai was classified as a Premier 5 event from 2009 to 2011 before being succeeded by Doha for the 2012–2014 period. In 2015, Dubai regained its Premier 5 status while Doha was demoted to Premier status. The Premier 5 tournaments were reclassified as WTA 1000 tournaments in 2021.)	NMS	A	A	A	A	1R	A	A	A	A	A	A	1R	1R	1R	A	A	0 / 4	0–4	0%
Indian Wells Open	A	A	A	2R	1R	1R	A	A	2R	1R	A	A	A	NH	1R	A	A	0 / 6	2–6	25%
Miami Open	A	A	A	3R	1R	2R	A	A	1R	Q1	A	1R	3R	NH	A	A	A	0 / 6	4–6	40%
Madrid Open	NH		A	1R	Q1	1R	A	A	Q1	Q1	A	Q1	1R	NH	1R	A	A	0 / 4	0–4	0%
Italian Open	A	A	A	2R	3R	A	A	Q1	Q1	Q1	A	1R	1R	3R	1R	A	A	0 / 6	5–6	45%
Canadian Open	A	A	A	A	1R	A	A	A	3R	A	A	A	1R	NH	Q2	A	A	0 / 3	2–3	40%
Cincinnati Open	NMS		A	A	1R	A	2R	1R	Q2	A	A	A	A	A	Q1	A	A	0 / 3	1–3	25%
Pan Pacific / Wuhan Open (Note: In 2014, the Pan Pacific Open was downgraded to a Premier event and replaced by the Wuhan Open. The Premier 5 tournaments were reclassified as WTA 1000 tournaments in 2021.)	A	A	A	1R	A	Q1	1R	Q1	A	A	A	2R	2R	NH				0 / 4	1–4	0%
China Open	NMS		A	2R	2R	3R	3R	2R	A	A	A	2R	3R	NH			A	0 / 7	10–7	59%
Career statistics
Tournaments	1	2	8	24	26	22	10	16	23	17	2	19	22	8	15	0	0	Career total: 215		
Titles	0	0	0	0	1	1	0	0	0	0	0	0	1	0	0	0	0	Career total: 3		
Finals	0	0	0	1	2	1	0	0	0	0	0	1	1	0	0	0	0	Career total: 6		
Hard win–loss	0–1	0–1	1–4	12–13	10–14	4–15	6–8	3–8	10–15	1–8	0–0	4–9	6–14	1–2	2–8	0–0	0–0	0 / 118	60–120	33%
Clay win–loss	0–0	0–1	5–4	12–10	17–9	10–6	3–2	8–6	8–6	5–6	0–1	10–7	8–4	5–6	2–5	0–0	0–0	3 / 76	93–73	56%
Grass win–loss	0–0	0–0	0–0	0–1	1–2	0–2	0–0	1–2	1–2	0–3	2–1	1–3	5–3	0–0	0–2	0–0	0–0	0 / 21	11–21	34%
Overall win–loss	0–1	0–2	6–8	24–24	28–25	14–23	9–10	12–16	19–23	6–17	2–2	15–19	19–21	6–8	4–15	0–0	0–0	3 / 215	164–214	43%
Win (%)	0%	0%	43%	50%	53%	38%	47%	43%	45%	26%	50%	44%	48%	43%	21%	–	–	Career total: 43%		
Year-end ranking	345	243	71	48	36	80	66	95	71	139	102	82	49	52	135	390	327	$4,271,837		

=== Doubles ===
Tournament	2009	2010	2011	2012	2013	2014	2015	2016	2017	2018	2019	2020	2021	2022	W–L
Grand Slam tournaments
Australian Open	A	1R	1R	3R	1R	A	A	1R	A	A	A	A	A	A	2–5
French Open	A	1R	1R	1R	A	1R	A	A	A	1R	1R	A	2R	A	1–7
Wimbledon	A	1R	A	A	A	A	A	1R	A	1R	A	NH	A	A	0–3
US Open	1R	3R	2R	1R	3R	A	1R	A	A	A	A	A	1R	A	5–7
Win–loss	0–1	2–4	1–3	2–3	2–2	0–1	0–1	0–2	0–0	0–2	0–1	0–0	1–2	0–0	8–22
WTA 1000
Dubai / Qatar Open	A	A	A	1R	A	A	A	A	A	A	A	A	A	A	0–1
Indian Wells Open	A	A	1R	A	A	A	A	A	A	A	A	NH	A	A	0–1
Madrid Open	A	A	1R	A	A	A	A	A	A	A	A	NH	A	A	0–1
Italian Open	A	2R	2R	A	A	A	A	A	A	A	A	A	A	A	2–2
Canadian Open	A	A	1R	A	A	A	A	A	A	A	A	NH	1R	A	0–2
Cincinnati Open	A	A	2R	A	A	A	A	A	A	A	A	A	A	A	1–1
China Open	A	1R	A	A	A	A	A	A	A	A	A	NH		A	0–1

== WTA Tour finals ==
=== Singles: 6 (3 titles, 3 runner-ups) ===
Legend WTA 500 WTA 250 (3–3)	Finals by surface Hard (0–0) Clay (3–3)

Result	W–L	Date	Tournament	Tier	Surface	Opponent	Score
Loss	0–1	Feb 2010	Abierto Mexicano, Mexico	International (Note: The WTA International tournaments were reclassified as WTA 250 tournaments in 2021.)	Clay	(United States) Venus Williams	6–2, 2–6, 3–6
Win	1–1	Jul 2011	Bastad Open, Sweden	International	Clay	(Sweden) Johanna Larsson	6–4, 7–5
Loss	1–2	Jul 2011	Palermo Ladies Open, Italy	International	Clay	(Spain) Anabel Medina Garrigues	3–6, 2–6
Win	2–2	Jul 2012	Bastad Open, Sweden (2)	International	Clay	(France) Mathilde Johansson	0–6, 6–4, 7–5
Loss	2–3	Apr 2018	İstanbul Cup, Turkey	International	Clay	(France) Pauline Parmentier	4–6, 6–3, 3–6
Win	3–3	Apr 2019	Ladies Open Lugano, Switzerland	International	Clay	(Poland) Iga Świątek	6–3, 3–6, 6–3

=== Doubles: 3 (2 titles, 1 runner-up) ===
Legend WTA 500 WTA 250 (2–1)	Finals by surface Hard (1–0) Clay (1–1)

Result	W–L	Date	Tournament	Tier	Surface	Partner	Opponents	Score
Loss	0–1	May 2008	İstanbul Cup, Turkey	Tier III	Clay	(New Zealand) Marina Erakovic	(United States) Jill Craybas (Belarus) Olga Govortsova	1–6, 2–6
Win	1–1	Feb 2010	Abierto Mexicano, Mexico	International	Clay	(Czech Republic) Barbora Strýcová	(Italy) Sara Errani (Italy) Roberta Vinci	2–6, 6–1, [10–2]
Win	2–1	Sep 2010	Korea Open, South Korea	International	Hard	(Germany) Julia Görges	(South Africa) Natalie Grandin (Czech Republic) Vladimíra Uhlířová	6–3, 6–4

== WTA 125 finals ==
=== Singles: 2 (1 title, 1 runner-up) ===
Result	W–L	Date	Tournament	Surface	Opponent	Score
Loss	0–1	Jun 2016	Bol Open, Croatia	Clay	(Luxembourg) Mandy Minella	2–6, 3–6
Win	0–1	Dec 2025	Quito Open, Ecuador	Clay	(Argentina) Luisa Giovannini	6-2, 6-1

== ITF Circuit finals ==
=== Singles: 23 (19 titles, 4 runner-ups) ===
Legend
$100,000 tournaments (2–0)
$75,000 tournaments (1–0)
$50/60,000 tournaments (5–1)
$40,000 tournaments (0–1)
$25,000 tournaments (8–2)
$10,000 tournaments (3–0)

Result	W–L	Date	Tournament	Tier	Surface	Opponent	Score
Win	1–0	Aug 2007	ITF Pesaro, Italy	10,000	Clay	(Liechtenstein) Stephanie Vogt	6–2, 2–6, 6–1
Win	2–0	Aug 2007	ITF Maribor, Slovenia	25,000	Clay	(Czech Republic) Tereza Hladíková	4–6, 6–1, 4–1 ret.
Win	3–0	Feb 2008	ITF Mallorca, Spain	10,000	Clay	(Spain) Inés Ferrer Suárez	6–3, 6–1
Win	4–0	Feb 2008	ITF Mallorca, Spain	10,000	Clay	(Liechtenstein) Stephanie Vogt	4–6, 6–1, 6–3
Loss	4–1	Apr 2008	ITF Civitavecchia, Italy	25,000	Clay	(Argentina) Betina Jozami	2–6, 2–6
Win	5–1	Apr 2009	ITF Civitavecchia, Italy	25,000	Clay	(Germany) Andrea Petkovic	6–2, 6–4
Win	6–1	May 2009	Zagreb Open, Croatia	50,000	Clay	(Slovenia) Maša Zec Peškirič	7–5, 6–2
Win	7–1	Jun 2009	ITF Zlín, Czech Republic	50,000	Clay	(Slovakia) Zuzana Kučová	6–3, 6–1
Win	8–1	Jun 2009	ITF Cuneo, Italy	100,000	Clay	(United States) Varvara Lepchenko	6–1, 6–2
Win	9–1	Feb 2010	Copa Cali, Colombia	75,000	Clay	(Colombia) Mariana Duque-Marino	6–4, 5–7, 6–2
Win	10–1	May 2013	Maribor Open, Slovenia	25,000	Clay	(Croatia) Ana Konjuh	3–6, 6–3, 6–3
Win	11–1	Jul 2013	ITS Cup Olomouc, Czech Republic	100,000	Clay	(Poland) Katarzyna Piter	6–0, 6–3
Win	12–1	Jun 2017	ITF Brescia, Italy	60,000	Clay	(Ukraine) Ganna Poznikhirenko	6–2, 7–5
Win	13–1	Sep 2017	ITF Balatonboglár, Hungary	25,000	Clay	(Hungary) Gréta Arn	6–1, 6–2
Win	14–1	Sep 2017	Open de Saint-Malo, France	60,000	Clay	(Latvia) Diāna Marcinkēviča	6–3, 6–3
Win	15–1	Oct 2017	ITF Pula, Italy	25,000	Clay	(Russia) Valentyna Ivakhnenko	6–1, 6–0
Win	16–1	Oct 2017	ITF Pula, Italy	25,000	Clay	(Mexico) Renata Zarazúa	6–4, 6–1
Win	17–1	Nov 2017	ITF Pula, Italy	25,000	Clay	(Romania) Cristina Dinu	6–1, 6–4
Win	18–1	Apr 2021	Oeiras Ladies Open, Portugal	W60	Clay	(France) Clara Burel	w/o
Win	19–1	Aug 2023	Vrnjačka Banja Open, Serbia	W25	Clay	(Bulgaria) Isabella Shinikova	6–2, 6–4
Loss	19–2	Jan 2024	ITF Antalya, Turkey	W50	Clay	(Spain) Guiomar Maristany	4–6, 1–6
Loss	19–3	Feb 2024	ITF Antalya, Turkey	W35	Clay	(Croatia) Tena Lukas	6–2, 3–6, 1–6
Loss	19–4	Apr 2024	Koper Open, Slovenia	W75	Clay	(Slovenia) Veronika Erjavec	4–6, 3–6

=== Doubles: 7 (5 titles, 2 runner-ups) ===
Legend
$100,000 tournaments (0–1)
$75,000 tournaments (1–0)
$50,000 tournaments (1–0)
$25,000 tournaments (1–1)
$10,000 tournaments (2–0)

Result	W–L	Date	Tournament	Tier	Surface	Partner	Opponents	Score
Win	1–0	Jan 2007	ITF Algiers, Algeria	10,000	Clay	(India) Rushmi Chakravarthi	(Czech Republic) Barbora Matúšová (Russia) Anna Savitskaya	6–2, 6–0
Win	2–0	Feb 2008	ITF Mallorca, Spain	10,000	Clay	(Liechtenstein) Stephanie Vogt	(Spain) Leticia Costas (Spain) Maite Gabarrús-Alonso	7–6^{(2)}, 6–3
Loss	2–1	Apr 2008	ITF Bari, Italy	25,000	Clay	(Liechtenstein) Stephanie Vogt	(Italy) Alberta Brianti (Italy) Anna Floris	3–6, 3–6
Win	3–1	Apr 2008	Makarska International, Croatia	50,000	Clay	(Liechtenstein) Stephanie Vogt	(Slovenia) Tadeja Majerič (Slovenia) Maša Zec Peškirič	7–5, 6–2
Win	4–1	Sep 2008	ITF Sarajevo, Bosnia & Herzegovina	25,000	Clay	(Italy) Alberta Brianti	(Turkey) Çağla Büyükakçay (Israel) Julia Glushko	6–4, 7–5
Loss	4–2	Sep 2009	Sofia Cup, Bulgaria	100,000	Clay	(Croatia) Petra Martić	(Italy) Tathiana Garbin (Switzerland) Timea Bacsinszky	2–6, 6–7
Win	5–2	Feb 2010	Copa Cali, Colombia	75,000	Clay	(United States) Edina Gallovits-Hall	(Spain) Estrella Cabeza Candela (Spain) Laura Pous Tió	3–6, 6–3, [10–8]

== Junior Grand Slam tournament finals ==
=== Doubles: 2 (2 titles) ===
Result	Year	Championship	Surface	Partner	Opponents	Score
Win	2008	French Open	Clay	(Australia) Jessica Moore	(Netherlands) Lesley Kerkhove (Netherlands) Arantxa Rus	5–7, 6–1, [10–7]
Win	2008	Wimbledon	Grass	(Australia) Jessica Moore	(Australia) Isabella Holland (Australia) Sally Peers	6–3, 1–6, 6–2

== Head-to-head record ==
=== Top 10 wins ===
Season	2012	...	2020	Total
Wins	1		1	2

#	Opponent	Rank	Event	Surface	Rd	Score	PHR
2012
1.	(France) Marion Bartoli	No. 7	Charleston Open, US	Clay	3R	6–4, 1–6, 6–4	No. 38
2020
2.	(Netherlands) Kiki Bertens	No. 8	Italian Open, Italy	Clay	2R	6–4, 6–4	No. 50
