= 2013 Abierto Mexicano Telcel =

- Date: 25 February – 2 March
- Edition: 20th (men) / 13th (women)
- Draw: 32S / 16D
- Prize money: $1,353,550 $235,000
- Surface: Clay
- Location: Acapulco, Mexico

Champions

Men's singles
- (Spain) Rafael Nadal

Women's singles
- (Italy) Sara Errani

Men's doubles
- (Poland) Łukasz Kubot / (Spain) David Marrero

Women's doubles
- (Spain) Lourdes Domínguez Lino / (Spain) Arantxa Parra Santonja
← 2012 ·	Mexican Open	· 2014 →

The 2013 Abierto Mexicano Telcel was a professional tennis tournament played on outdoor clay courts. It was the 20th edition of the men's tournament (13th for the women), and part of the 2013 ATP World Tour and the 2013 WTA Tour. It took place in Acapulco, Mexico between 25 February and 2 March 2013.

== Points and prize money ==
=== Point distribution ===
Event	W	F	SF	QF	Round of 16	Round of 32	Q	Q3	Q2	Q1
Men's singles	500	300	180	90	45	0	20	—	10	0
Men's doubles	500	300	180	90	0	—	—	—	—	—
Women's singles	280	200	130	70	30	1	16	10	6	1
Women's doubles	280	200	130	70	1	—	—	—	—	—

=== Prize money ===
Event	W	F	SF	QF	Round of 16	Round of 32	Q3	Q2	Q1
Men's singles	$300,000	$126,000	$55,500	$25,750	$12,250	$6,400	—	$950	$525
Men's doubles *	$86,200	$38,900	$18,340	$8,860	$4,550	—	—	—	—
Women's singles	$37,000	$19,000	$10,200	$5,340	$2,950	$1,725	$950	$700	$500
Women's doubles *	$11,500	$6,000	$3,200	$1,700	$900	—	—	—	—

_{* per team}

== ATP singles main draw entrants ==
=== Seeds ===
Country	Player	Ranking^{1}	Seed
ESP	David Ferrer	4	1
ESP	Rafael Nadal	5	2
ESP	Nicolás Almagro	11	3
SUI	Stanislas Wawrinka	17	4
AUT	Jürgen Melzer	27	5
BRA	Thomaz Bellucci	38	6
FRA	Benoît Paire	39	7
ARG	Horacio Zeballos	41	8

- ^{1} Rankings as of February 18, 2013.

=== Other entrants ===
The following players received wildcards into the main draw:

- (Mexico) Daniel Garza
- (Mexico) César Ramírez
- (Mexico) Miguel Ángel Reyes-Varela

The following players received entry from the qualifying draw:

- (Argentina) Martín Alund
- (Serbia) Dušan Lajović
- (United States) Wayne Odesnik
- (Argentina) Diego Schwartzman

The following player received entry as lucky loser:

- (Croatia) Antonio Veić

=== Withdrawals ===
Before the tournament

- (France) Jérémy Chardy
- (Argentina) Juan Mónaco (hand injury)
- (Spain) Albert Ramos
- (Spain) Fernando Verdasco (neck injury)

== ATP doubles main draw entrants ==
=== Seeds ===
Country	Player	Country	Player	Rank^{1}	Seed
AUT	Alexander Peya	BRA	Bruno Soares	42	1
POL	Łukasz Kubot	ESP	David Marrero	51	2
MEX	Santiago González	USA	Scott Lipsky	66	3
AUT	Jürgen Melzer	GER	Philipp Petzschner	76	4

- ^{1} Rankings as of February 18, 2013.

=== Other entrants ===
The following pairs received wildcards into the main draw:

- (Mexico) Miguel Gallardo Valles / (Mexico) César Ramírez
- (Mexico) Daniel Garza / (Mexico) Miguel Ángel Reyes-Varela

The following pair received entry as alternates:

- (Italy) Potito Starace / (Italy) Filippo Volandri

=== Withdrawals ===
Before the tournament

- (France) Jérémy Chardy
- (Spain) Albert Ramos
- (Spain) Fernando Verdasco (neck injury)

== WTA singles main draw entrants ==
=== Seeds ===
Country	Player	Ranking^{1}	Seed
ITA	Sara Errani	7	1
ESP	Carla Suárez Navarro	28	2
FRA	Alizé Cornet	36	3
ROU	Irina-Camelia Begu	45	4
NED	Kiki Bertens	47	5
ITA	Francesca Schiavone	53	6
ESP	Lourdes Domínguez Lino	54	7
SUI	Romina Oprandi	57	8

- ^{1} Rankings as of February 18, 2013.

=== Other entrants ===
The following players received wildcards into the main draw:

- (Mexico) Ximena Hermoso
- (Italy) Francesca Schiavone
- (Croatia) Ajla Tomljanović

The following players received entry from the qualifying draw:

- (Canada) Eugenie Bouchard
- (Colombia) Catalina Castaño
- (Spain) María José Martínez Sánchez
- (United States) Grace Min

The following player received entry as a lucky loser:

- (Canada) Sharon Fichman

=== Withdrawals ===
Before the tournament

- (Sweden) Sofia Arvidsson
- (Romania) Edina Gallovits-Hall
- (Slovenia) Polona Hercog
- (Netherlands) Arantxa Rus (gastrointestinal illness)
- (Georgia (country)) Anna Tatishvili
- (Russia) Vera Zvonareva (shoulder injury)

=== Retirements ===
- (Romania) Irina-Camelia Begu
- (Spain) María Teresa Torró Flor

== WTA doubles main draw entrants ==
=== Seeds ===
Country	Player	Country	Player	Rank^{1}	Seed
LUX	Mandy Minella	USA	Megan Moulton-Levy	144	1
CZE	Eva Birnerová	CZE	Renata Voráčová	146	2
ESP	Inés Ferrer Suárez	ESP	María José Martínez Sánchez	164	3
ESP	Lourdes Domínguez Lino	ESP	Arantxa Parra Santonja	174	4

- ^{1} Rankings as of February 18, 2013.

=== Other entrants ===
The following pairs received wildcards into the main draw:

- (Mexico) Ximena Hermoso / (Mexico) Ana Sofía Sánchez
- (Mexico) Victoria Rodríguez / (Mexico) Marcela Zacarías

== Finals ==
=== Men's singles ===
- (Spain) Rafael Nadal defeated (Spain) David Ferrer, 6–0, 6–2

=== Women's singles ===
- (Italy) Sara Errani defeated (Spain) Carla Suárez Navarro, 6–0, 6–4

=== Men's doubles ===
- (Poland) Łukasz Kubot / (Spain) David Marrero defeated (Italy) Simone Bolelli / (Italy) Fabio Fognini, 7–5, 6–2

=== Women's doubles ===
- (Spain) Lourdes Domínguez Lino / (Spain) Arantxa Parra Santonja defeated (Colombia) Catalina Castaño / (Colombia) Mariana Duque Mariño, 6–4, 7–6^{(7–1)}
