= 2015 Abierto Mexicano Telcel – Women's singles =

Women's singles
- 2015 Abierto Mexicano Telcel

Final
- Champion: (Switzerland) Timea Bacsinszky
- Runner-up: (France) Caroline Garcia
- Score: 6–3, 6–0

Details
- Draw: 32
- Seeds: 8

Events
Singles	men	women
Doubles	men	women
- Abierto Mexicano Telcel

Dominika Cibulková was the defending champion, but she chose not to defend her title.

Timea Bacsinszky won the title, defeating Caroline Garcia in the final, 6–3, 6–0.

== Seeds ==
1. (Russia) Maria Sharapova (semifinals, withdrew with a stomach virus)
2. (Italy) Sara Errani (second round)
3. (France) Caroline Garcia (final)
4. (Romania) Irina-Camelia Begu (withdrew due to a rib injury)
5. (Switzerland) Timea Bacsinszky (champion)
6. (Italy) Roberta Vinci (first round, retired)
7. (United States) Sloane Stephens (first round)
8. (United States) Madison Brengle (first round)
9. (Slovakia) Daniela Hantuchová (withdrew due to a right foot injury)
10. (Croatia) Ajla Tomljanović (first round)

== Draw ==
Key

- Q = Qualifier
- WC = Wild card
- LL = Lucky loser
- Alt = Alternate
- ITF = ITF entry
- PR = Protected ranking
- SR = Special ranking
- SE = Special exempt
- JE = Junior exempt
- JR = Junior Accelerator Programme entrant
- CO = College Accelerator Programme entrant
- NG = Next Gen Accelerator Program entrant
- w/o = Walkover
- r = Retired
- d = Defaulted

=== Finals ===
Semifinals
1	(Russia) Maria Sharapova
3	(France) Caroline Garcia	w/o
5	(Switzerland) Timea Bacsinszky	6	6
LL	(Bulgaria) Sesil Karatantcheva	2	4

Final
3	(France) Caroline Garcia	3	0
5	(Switzerland) Timea Bacsinszky	6	6

=== Top half ===
First round
1	(Russia) M Sharapova	6	6
(United States) S Rogers	4	1
LL	(Colombia) M Duque Mariño	1	6	7
Q	(United States) L Chirico	6	3	5
Q	(Romania) E Bogdan	6	7^{7}
(United States) L Davis	4	6^{3}
(Slovakia) M Rybáriková	6	6
10	(Croatia) A Tomljanović	3	4
3	(France) C Garcia	6	6
(Slovenia) P Hercog	4	1
WC	(Mexico) M Zacarías	2	1
PR	(United States) B Mattek-Sands	6	6
(Croatia) M Lučić-Baroni	6	6
(Spain) L Arruabarrena	3	3
(Spain) MT Torró Flor	2	7	7
8	(United States) M Brengle	6	5	5

Second round
1	(Russia) M Sharapova	6	6
LL	(Colombia) M Duque Mariño	1	2
Q	(Romania) E Bogdan	0	2
(Slovakia) M Rybáriková	6	6
3	(France) C Garcia	6	6
PR	(United States) B Mattek-Sands	2	3
(Croatia) M Lučić-Baroni	6^{5}	6	7
(Spain) MT Torró Flor	7^{7}	3	5

Quarterfinals
1	(Russia) M Sharapova	6	4	6
(Slovakia) M Rybáriková	1	6	2
3	(France) C Garcia	6	2
(Croatia) M Lučić-Baroni	2	1^{r}

Semifinals
1	(Russia) M Sharapova
3	(France) C Garcia	w/o

=== Bottom half ===
First round
7	(United States) S Stephens	3	2
(Sweden) J Larsson	6	6
(Serbia) A Krunić	6	6
(Slovakia) A Schmiedlová	2	1
(Ukraine) L Tsurenko	6	6
WC	(Mexico) AS Sánchez	2	0
Q	(Netherlands) R Hogenkamp	6	2	3
5	(Switzerland) T Bacsinszky	2	6	6
6	(Italy) R Vinci	5^{r}
(Netherlands) K Bertens	6
LL	(Bulgaria) S Karatantcheva	6	6
WC	(Czech Republic) M Bouzková	4	3
(Czech Republic) T Smitková	4	6	3
(Puerto Rico) M Puig	6	3	6
Q	(Czech Republic) L Hradecká	1	3
2	(Italy) S Errani	6	6

Second round
(Sweden) J Larsson	6	6
(Serbia) A Krunić	1	2
(Ukraine) L Tsurenko	2	6^{4}
5	(Switzerland) T Bacsinszky	6	7^{7}
(Netherlands) K Bertens	1	4
LL	(Bulgaria) S Karatantcheva	6	6
(Puerto Rico) M Puig	6	6
2	(Italy) S Errani	1	1

Quarterfinals
(Sweden) J Larsson	3	3
5	(Switzerland) T Bacsinszky	6	6
LL	(Bulgaria) S Karatantcheva	2	7^{9}	6
(Puerto Rico) M Puig	6	6^{7}	4

Semifinals
5	(Switzerland) T Bacsinszky	6	6
LL	(Bulgaria) S Karatantcheva	2	4

== Qualifying ==
=== Seeds ===
1. (Belgium) Alison Van Uytvanck (first round)
2. (United States) Irina Falconi (second round)
3. (Japan) Kimiko Date-Krumm (first round, retired)
4. (Belgium) An-Sophie Mestach (second round)
5. (Czech Republic) Lucie Hradecká (qualified)
6. (Netherlands) Richèl Hogenkamp (qualified)
7. (Colombia) Mariana Duque Mariño (qualifying competition, lucky loser)
8. (Poland) Urszula Radwańska (second round)

=== Qualifiers ===
1. (Czech Republic) Lucie Hradecká
2. (Romania) Elena Bogdan
3. (Netherlands) Richèl Hogenkamp
4. (United States) Louisa Chirico

=== Lucky losers ===
1. (Colombia) Mariana Duque Mariño
2. (Bulgaria) Sesil Karatantcheva

=== Draw ===
==== First qualifier ====
First round
1	(Belgium) Alison Van Uytvanck	6^{5}	1
(Bulgaria) Sesil Karatantcheva	7^{7}	6
(Argentina) María Irigoyen	6	7
(France) Laura Thorpe	1	5
WC	(Mexico) Adriana Guzmán	1	1
(Spain) Sara Sorribes Tormo	6	6
(Czech Republic) Barbora Štefková	3	4
5	(Czech Republic) Lucie Hradecká	6	6

Second round
(Bulgaria) Sesil Karatantcheva	6	6
(Argentina) María Irigoyen	2	1
(Spain) Sara Sorribes Tormo	3	1
5	(Czech Republic) Lucie Hradecká	6	6

Qualifying competition
(Bulgaria) Sesil Karatantcheva	3	3
5	(Czech Republic) Lucie Hradecká	6	6

==== Second qualifier ====
First round
2	(United States) Irina Falconi	6	6
WC	(Romania) Raluca Olaru	1	0
(Romania) Elena Bogdan	6	7^{7}
WC	(Mexico) Carolina Betancourt	1	6^{2}
(Romania) Ana Bogdan	6	6
WC	(Paraguay) Ana Paula Neffa de los Ríos	2	1
(Japan) Eri Hozumi	6^{3}	2
7	(Colombia) Mariana Duque Mariño	7^{7}	6

Second round
2	(United States) Irina Falconi	3	2
(Romania) Elena Bogdan	6	6
(Romania) Ana Bogdan	4	1
7	(Colombia) Mariana Duque Mariño	6	6

Qualifying competition
(Romania) Elena Bogdan	6	4	7^{7}
7	(Colombia) Mariana Duque Mariño	4	6	6^{1}

==== Third qualifier ====
First round
3	(Japan) Kimiko Date-Krumm	7^{8}	2	0^{r}
(Japan) Makoto Ninomiya	6^{6}	6	0
(Russia) Marina Shamayko	1	6	7
(Dominican Republic) Francesca Segarelli	6	1	5
(Chinese Taipei) Chan Chin-wei	1	1
(Ukraine) Kateryna Bondarenko	6	6
(United States) Nicole Melichar	2	2
6	(Netherlands) Richèl Hogenkamp	6	6

Second round
(Japan) Makoto Ninomiya	6	6
(Russia) Marina Shamayko	2	1
(Ukraine) Kateryna Bondarenko	3	3
6	(Netherlands) Richèl Hogenkamp	6	6

Qualifying competition
(Japan) Makoto Ninomiya	6	1	6^{4}
6	(Netherlands) Richèl Hogenkamp	3	6	7^{7}

==== Fourth qualifier ====
First round
4	(Belgium) An-Sophie Mestach	w/o
WC	(Mexico) Victoria Rodríguez
(Japan) Risa Ozaki	7^{7}	7
(Japan) Nao Hibino	6^{4}	5
(United States) Louisa Chirico	6	6
WC	(Mexico) Emma Reyes Baca	1	0
(Japan) Naomi Osaka	1	4
8	(Poland) Urszula Radwańska	6	6

Second round
4	(Belgium) An-Sophie Mestach	6^{2}	1
(Japan) Risa Ozaki	7^{7}	6
(United States) Louisa Chirico	6^{2}	6	6
8	(Poland) Urszula Radwańska	7^{7}	1	0

Qualifying competition
(Japan) Risa Ozaki	2	3
(United States) Louisa Chirico	6	6
