= 2013 Abierto Mexicano Telcel – Women's doubles =

Women's doubles
- 2013 Abierto Mexicano Telcel

Final
- Champions: (Spain) Lourdes Domínguez Lino (Spain) Arantxa Parra Santonja
- Runners-up: (Colombia) Catalina Castaño (Colombia) Mariana Duque Mariño
- Score: 6–4, 7–6^{(7–1)}

Events
Singles	men	women
Doubles	men	women
← 2012 ·	Abierto Mexicano Telcel	· 2014 →

Sara Errani and Roberta Vinci were the defending champions but decided not to participate.

Lourdes Domínguez Lino and Arantxa Parra Santonja won the title, defeating Catalina Castaño and Mariana Duque Mariño in the final, 6–4, 7–6^{(7–1)}.

== Seeds ==
1. (Luxembourg) Mandy Minella / (United States) Megan Moulton-Levy (first round)
2. (Czech Republic) Eva Birnerová / (Czech Republic) Renata Voráčová (first round)
3. (Spain) Inés Ferrer Suárez / (Spain) María José Martínez Sánchez (first round)
4. (Spain) Lourdes Domínguez Lino / (Spain) Arantxa Parra Santonja (champions)

== Draw ==
=== Key ===
- Q = Qualifier
- WC = Wild card
- LL = Lucky loser
- Alt = Alternate
- SE = Special exempt
- PR = Protected ranking
- ITF = ITF entry
- JE = Junior exempt
- w/o = Walkover
- r = Retired
- d = Defaulted
- SR = Special ranking

=== Draw ===
First round
1	(Luxembourg) M Minella (United States) M Moulton-Levy	2	5
(United States) I Falconi (Croatia) A Tomljanović	6	7
(France) A Cornet (France) P Parmentier	2	7	[3]
(France) S Foretz Gacon (Czech Republic) E Hrdinová	6	5	[10]
4	(Spain) L Domínguez Lino (Spain) A Parra Santonja	6	6
(Switzerland) A Sadiković (Ukraine) O Savchuk	1	4
WC	(Mexico) V Rodríguez (Mexico) M Zacarías	6	6
WC	(Mexico) X Hermoso (Mexico) AS Sánchez	3	2
(Romania) E Bogdan (United States) J Craybas	6	6^{5}	[11]
(Spain) S Soler Espinosa (Spain) C Suárez Navarro	4	7^{7}	[9]
(Colombia) C Castaño (Colombia) M Duque Mariño	7	6^{4}	[10]
3	(Spain) I Ferrer Suárez (Spain) MJ Martínez Sánchez	5	7^{7}	[5]
(United States) J Cohen (Poland) K Piter	4	1
(Switzerland) R Oprandi (Italy) F Schiavone	6	6
(Russia) A Panova (France) L Thorpe	7	6
2	(Czech Republic) E Birnerová (Czech Republic) R Voráčová	5	4

Quarterfinals
(United States) I Falconi (Croatia) A Tomljanović	6	2	[9]
(France) S Foretz Gacon (Czech Republic) E Hrdinová	3	6	[11]
4	(Spain) L Domínguez Lino (Spain) A Parra Santonja	6	6
WC	(Mexico) V Rodríguez (Mexico) M Zacarías	3	3
(Romania) E Bogdan (United States) J Craybas	1	0
(Colombia) C Castaño (Colombia) M Duque Mariño	6	6
(Switzerland) R Oprandi (Italy) F Schiavone	2	1
(Russia) A Panova (France) L Thorpe	6	6

Semifinals
(France) S Foretz Gacon (Czech Republic) E Hrdinová	2	2
4	(Spain) L Domínguez Lino (Spain) A Parra Santonja	6	6
(Colombia) C Castaño (Colombia) M Duque Mariño	4	6	[10]
(Russia) A Panova (France) L Thorpe	6	2	[8]

Final
4	(Spain) L Domínguez Lino (Spain) A Parra Santonja	6	7^{7}
(Colombia) C Castaño (Colombia) M Duque Mariño	4	6^{1}
