= 2012 Abierto Mexicano Telcel – Women's doubles =

Women's doubles
- 2012 Abierto Mexicano Telcel

Final
- Champions: (Italy) Sara Errani (Italy) Roberta Vinci
- Runners-up: (Spain) Lourdes Domínguez Lino (Spain) Arantxa Parra Santonja
- Score: 6–2, 6–1

Events
| Singles | men | women |
| Doubles | men | women |
| ← 2011 · | Abierto Mexicano Telcel | · 2013 → |

Mariya Koryttseva and Raluca Olaru were the defending champions but Olaru decided not to participate.
Koryttseva played alongside Darija Jurak but lost in the quarterfinals to Gisela Dulko and Paola Suárez.
Sara Errani and Roberta Vinci defeated Lourdes Domínguez Lino and Arantxa Parra Santonja 6–2, 6–1 in the final to win the title.

== Seeds ==
1. (Italy) Sara Errani / (Italy) Roberta Vinci (champions)
2. (Spain) Lourdes Domínguez Lino / (Spain) Arantxa Parra Santonja (final)
3. (Romania) Irina-Camelia Begu / (France) Alizé Cornet (semifinals)
4. (Croatia) Darija Jurak / (Ukraine) Mariya Koryttseva (quarterfinals)

== Draw ==
=== Key ===
- Q = Qualifier
- WC = Wild card
- LL = Lucky loser
- Alt = Alternate
- SE = Special exempt
- PR = Protected ranking
- ITF = ITF entry
- JE = Junior exempt
- w/o = Walkover
- r = Retired
- d = Defaulted
- SR = Special ranking

=== Draw ===
First round
1 | (Italy) S Errani (Italy) R Vinci | 6 | 6
Alt | (Canada) S Fichman (China) S Sun | 2 | 2
(Italy) A Brianti (Italy) ME Camerin | 4 | 6 | [10]
(Switzerland) T Bacsinszky (Sweden) J Larsson | 6 | 4 | [5]
3 | (Romania) I-C Begu (France) A Cornet | 6 | 6
(Hungary) T Babos (Czech Republic) E Birnerová | 3 | 1
(Russia) M Kondratieva (United States) M Moulton-Levy | 7^{7} | 2 | [3]
(Germany) T Malek (Germany) J Wöhr | 6^{1} | 6 | [10]
(Romania) A Dulgheru (France) S Foretz Gacon | 6 | 2 | [9]
WC | (Argentina) G Dulko (Argentina) P Suárez | 4 | 6 | [11]
WC | (Mexico) AP de la Peña (Mexico) I López | 1 | 2
4 | (Croatia) D Jurak (Ukraine) M Koryttseva | 6 | 6
(Slovakia) J Husárová (Hungary) K Marosi | 6 | 6
(Netherlands) M Krajicek (Georgia (country)) A Tatishvili | 2 | 1
(Latvia) L Dekmeijere (France) S Lefevre | 2 | 1
2 | (Spain) L Domínguez Lino (Spain) A Parra Santonja | 6 | 6

Quarterfinals
1 | (Italy) S Errani (Italy) R Vinci | 6 | 6
(Italy) A Brianti (Italy) ME Camerin | 4 | 2
3 | (Romania) I-C Begu (France) A Cornet | 6 | 6
(Germany) T Malek (Germany) J Wöhr | 3 | 1
WC | (Argentina) G Dulko (Argentina) P Suárez | 6 | 6
4 | (Croatia) D Jurak (Ukraine) M Koryttseva | 3 | 4
(Slovakia) J Husárová (Hungary) K Marosi | 3 | 6^{3}
2 | (Spain) L Domínguez Lino (Spain) A Parra Santonja | 6 | 7^{7}

Semifinals
1 | (Italy) S Errani (Italy) R Vinci | 6 | 6
3 | (Romania) I-C Begu (France) A Cornet | 4 | 2
WC | (Argentina) G Dulko (Argentina) P Suárez | 4 | 4
2 | (Spain) L Domínguez Lino (Spain) A Parra Santonja | 6 | 6

Final
1 | (Italy) S Errani (Italy) R Vinci | 6 | 6
2 | (Spain) L Domínguez Lino (Spain) A Parra Santonja | 2 | 1
