= 2014 Abierto Mexicano Telcel – Men's singles =

Men's singles
- 2014 Abierto Mexicano Telcel

Final
- Champion: (Bulgaria) Grigor Dimitrov
- Runner-up: (South Africa) Kevin Anderson
- Score: 7–6^{(7–1)}, 3–6, 7–6^{(7–5)}

Events
| Singles | men | women |
| Doubles | men | women |
- Abierto Mexicano Telcel

Rafael Nadal was the defending champion but chose not to compete this year.

Grigor Dimitrov won the title in the first hard-court edition of the tournament, defeating Kevin Anderson in the final, 7–6^{(7–1)}, 3–6, 7–6^{(7–5)}.

== Seeds ==
1. (Spain) David Ferrer (quarterfinals, retired because of a leg strain)
2. (United Kingdom) Andy Murray (semifinals)
3. (United States) John Isner (first round)
4. (Bulgaria) Grigor Dimitrov (champion)

5. (South Africa) Kevin Anderson (final)
6. (France) Gilles Simon (quarterfinals)
7. (Latvia) Ernests Gulbis (quarterfinals)
8. (Canada) Vasek Pospisil (first round)

== Draw ==
Key

- Q = Qualifier
- WC = Wild card
- LL = Lucky loser
- Alt = Alternate
- ITF = ITF entry
- PR = Protected ranking
- SR = Special ranking
- SE = Special exempt
- JE = Junior exempt
- JR = Junior Accelerator Programme entrant
- CO = College Accelerator Programme entrant
- NG = Next Gen Accelerator Program entrant
- w/o = Walkover
- r = Retired
- d = Defaulted

=== Finals ===
Semifinals
5 | (South Africa) Kevin Anderson | 6 | 5 | 6
(Ukraine) Alexandr Dolgopolov | 1 | 7 | 4
4 | (Bulgaria) Grigor Dimitrov | 4 | 7^{7} | 7^{7}
2 | (United Kingdom) Andy Murray | 6 | 6^{5} | 6^{3}

Final
5 | (South Africa) Kevin Anderson | 6^{1} | 6 | 6^{5}
4 | (Bulgaria) Grigor Dimitrov | 7^{7} | 3 | 7^{7}

=== Top half ===
First round
1 | (Spain) D Ferrer | 6 | 6
(Kazakhstan) M Kukushkin | 2 | 3
(Spain) F López | 6 | 6
(France) É Roger-Vasselin | 4 | 2
(United States) S Querrey | 6^{5} | 6 | 6
WC | (Mexico) T Hank | 7^{7} | 4 | 3
Q | (France) S Robert | 2 | 6^{7}
5 | (South Africa) K Anderson | 6 | 7^{9}
3 | (United States) J Isner | 6^{4} | 6^{5}
(Croatia) I Karlović | 7^{7} | 7^{7}
(Israel) D Sela | 6 | 6
Q | (Colombia) A Falla | 1 | 4
(France) J Chardy | 7 | 6
(Australia) M Ebden | 5 | 0
(Ukraine) A Dolgopolov | 6 | 6
8 | (Canada) V Pospisil | 2 | 2

Second round
1 | (Spain) D Ferrer | 7^{7} | 6
(Spain) F López | 6^{1} | 2
(United States) S Querrey | 6^{2} | 4
5 | (South Africa) K Anderson | 7^{7} | 6
(Croatia) I Karlović | 7^{7} | 6
(Israel) D Sela | 6^{4} | 2
(France) J Chardy | 3 | 4
(Ukraine) A Dolgopolov | 6 | 6

Quarterfinals
1 | (Spain) D Ferrer | 6 | 2^{r}
5 | (South Africa) K Anderson | 2 | 4
(Croatia) I Karlović | 4 | 6^{4}
(Ukraine) A Dolgopolov | 6 | 7^{7}

Semifinals
5 | (South Africa) K Anderson | 6 | 5 | 6
(Ukraine) A Dolgopolov | 1 | 7 | 4

=== Bottom half ===
First round
7 | (Latvia) E Gulbis | 6 | 6
(Chinese Taipei) Y-h Lu | 1 | 1
(Poland) Ł Kubot | 4 | 6 | 4
Q | (Belgium) D Goffin | 6 | 2 | 6
WC | (Mexico) MÁ Reyes-Varela | 2 | 4
WC | (Cyprus) M Baghdatis | 6 | 6
(Australia) M Matosevic | 5 | 1
4 | (Bulgaria) G Dimitrov | 7 | 6
6 | (France) G Simon | 6 | 6
Q | (United States) T Smyczek | 1 | 2
LL | (United States) D Young | 6 | 6
(Finland) J Nieminen | 3 | 3
(Portugal) J Sousa | 1 | 6 | 6
(France) A Mannarino | 6 | 2 | 2
(Spain) P Andújar | 6 | 1 | 2
2 | (United Kingdom) A Murray | 3 | 6 | 6

Second round
7 | (Latvia) E Gulbis | 6 | 3 | 7^{7}
Q | (Belgium) D Goffin | 1 | 6 | 6^{5}
WC | (Cyprus) M Baghdatis | 1 | 4
4 | (Bulgaria) G Dimitrov | 6 | 6
6 | (France) G Simon | 6 | 6
LL | (United States) D Young | 4 | 3
(Portugal) J Sousa | 3 | 4
2 | (United Kingdom) A Murray | 6 | 6

Quarterfinals
7 | (Latvia) E Gulbis | 6 | 6^{2} | 5
4 | (Bulgaria) G Dimitrov | 4 | 7^{7} | 7
6 | (France) G Simon | 6 | 6^{4} | 2
2 | (United Kingdom) A Murray | 1 | 7^{7} | 6

Semifinals
4 | (Bulgaria) G Dimitrov | 4 | 7^{7} | 7^{7}
2 | (United Kingdom) A Murray | 6 | 6^{5} | 6^{3}

== Qualifying ==
=== Seeds ===
1. (United States) Donald Young (qualifying competition, retired, lucky loser)
2. (Colombia) Alejandro Falla (qualified)
3. (France) Stéphane Robert (qualified)
4. (Austria) Dominic Thiem (qualifying competition)
5. (United States) Tim Smyczek (qualified)
6. (Belgium) David Goffin (qualified)
7. (United States) Wayne Odesnik (qualifying competition)
8. (Germany) Mischa Zverev (first round)

=== Qualifiers ===
1. (United States) Tim Smyczek
2. (Colombia) Alejandro Falla
3. (France) Stéphane Robert
4. (Belgium) David Goffin

=== Lucky loser ===
1. (United States) Donald Young

=== Qualifying draw ===
==== First qualifier ====
First round
1 | (United States) Donald Young | 6 | 7
(Guatemala) Christopher Díaz Figueroa | 1 | 5
WC | (Mexico) César Ramírez | 2 | 3
5 | (United States) Tim Smyczek | 6 | 6

Qualifying competition
1 | (United States) Donald Young | 2 | 0^{r}
5 | (United States) Tim Smyczek | 6 | 3

==== Second qualifier ====
First round
2 | (Colombia) Alejandro Falla | 6 | 7^{10}
(Australia) Thanasi Kokkinakis | 4 | 6^{8}
(United States) Nicolas Meister | 6 | 6
8 | (Germany) Mischa Zverev | 4 | 3

Qualifying competition
2 | (Colombia) Alejandro Falla | 7^{7} | 6
(United States) Nicolas Meister | 6^{4} | 2

==== Third qualifier ====
First round
3 | (France) Stéphane Robert | 6 | 6
WC | (Mexico) Luis Patiño | 2 | 1
(United States) Daniel Kosakowski | 3 | 1
7 | (United States) Wayne Odesnik | 6 | 6

Qualifying competition
3 | (France) Stéphane Robert | 6 | 2
7 | (United States) Wayne Odesnik | 2 | 0^{r}

==== Fourth qualifier ====
First round
4 | (Austria) Dominic Thiem | 6 | 6
(Zimbabwe) Takanyi Garanganga | 2 | 3
WC | (Mexico) Mauricio Astorga | 0 | 1
6 | (Belgium) David Goffin | 6 | 6

Qualifying competition
4 | (Austria) Dominic Thiem | 6 | 1 | 6^{1}
6 | (Belgium) David Goffin | 3 | 6 | 7^{7}
