= 2014 Abierto Mexicano Telcel – Women's doubles =

Women's doubles
- 2014 Abierto Mexicano Telcel

Final
- Champions: (France) Kristina Mladenovic (Kazakhstan) Galina Voskoboeva
- Runners-up: (Czech Republic) Petra Cetkovská (Czech Republic) Iveta Melzer
- Score: 6–3, 2–6, [10–5]

Events
Singles	men	women
Doubles	men	women
← 2013 ·	Abierto Mexicano Telcel	· 2015 →

Lourdes Domínguez Lino and Arantxa Parra Santonja were the defending champions, but chose not to participate.
Kristina Mladenovic and Galina Voskoboeva won the title, defeating Petra Cetkovská and Iveta Melzer in the final, 6–3, 2–6, [10–5].

== Seeds ==
1. (Germany) Julia Görges / (Germany) Anna-Lena Grönefeld (quarterfinals)
2. (France) Kristina Mladenovic / (Kazakhstan) Galina Voskoboeva (champions)
3. (Australia) Ashleigh Barty / (New Zealand) Marina Erakovic (withdrew because of Barty's illness)
4. (France) Caroline Garcia / (Georgia (country)) Oksana Kalashnikova (first round)

== Draw ==
=== Key ===
- Q = Qualifier
- WC = Wild card
- LL = Lucky loser
- Alt = Alternate
- SE = Special exempt
- PR = Protected ranking
- ITF = ITF entry
- JE = Junior exempt
- w/o = Walkover
- r = Retired
- d = Defaulted
- SR = Special ranking

=== Draw ===
First round
1	(Germany) J Görges (Germany) A-L Grönefeld	6	6
WC	(Mexico) V Rodríguez (Mexico) M Zacarías	4	0
(Czech Republic) P Cetkovská (Czech Republic) I Melzer	6	7
(Canada) S Fichman (United States) M Sanchez	2	5
4	(France) C Garcia (Georgia (country)) O Kalashnikova	3	6	[6]
(France) S Foretz Gacon (Czech Republic) E Hrdinová	6	4	[10]
(Japan) K Date-Krumm (United Kingdom) H Watson	6^{3}	6	[4]
(United States) C McHale (Croatia) A Tomljanović	7^{7}	3	[10]
(Poland) K Jans-Ignacik (Ukraine) M Zanevska	6	2	[10]
(United States) I Falconi (Georgia (country)) A Tatishvili	2	6	[5]
(Australia) O Rogowska (Belgium) Y Wickmayer	6	7^{7}
Alt	(Spain) L Arruabarrena (Slovakia) J Čepelová	4	6^{5}
(Chinese Taipei) C-j Chuang (China) S Zhang	6	6
(Canada) G Dabrowski (Israel) S Pe'er	1	2
WC	(Mexico) X Hermoso (Mexico) AS Sánchez	0	0
2	(France) K Mladenovic (Kazakhstan) G Voskoboeva	6	6

Quarterfinals
1	(Germany) J Görges (Germany) A-L Grönefeld	7^{7}	5	[7]
(Czech Republic) P Cetkovská (Czech Republic) I Melzer	6^{3}	7	[10]
(France) S Foretz Gacon (Czech Republic) E Hrdinová	4	3
(United States) C McHale (Croatia) A Tomljanović	6	6
(Poland) K Jans-Ignacik (Ukraine) M Zanevska	1	6	[10]
(Australia) O Rogowska (Belgium) Y Wickmayer	6	3	[8]
(Chinese Taipei) C-j Chuang (China) S Zhang	4	3
2	(France) K Mladenovic (Kazakhstan) G Voskoboeva	6	6

Semifinals
(Czech Republic) P Cetkovská (Czech Republic) I Melzer	6	2	[11]
(United States) C McHale (Croatia) A Tomljanović	3	6	[9]
(Poland) K Jans-Ignacik (Ukraine) M Zanevska	6	2	[9]
2	(France) K Mladenovic (Kazakhstan) G Voskoboeva	2	6	[11]

Final
(Czech Republic) P Cetkovská (Czech Republic) I Melzer	3	6	[5]
2	(France) K Mladenovic (Kazakhstan) G Voskoboeva	6	2	[10]
