= 2014 Abierto Mexicano Telcel =

- Date: 24 February – 1 March
- Edition: 21st (men) / 14th (women)
- Draw: 32S / 16D
- Prize money: $1,309,770 $250,000
- Surface: Hard
- Location: Acapulco, Mexico

Champions

Men's singles
- (Bulgaria) Grigor Dimitrov

Women's singles
- (Slovakia) Dominika Cibulková

Men's doubles
- (South Africa) Kevin Anderson / (Australia) Matthew Ebden

Women's doubles
- (France) Kristina Mladenovic / (Kazakhstan) Galina Voskoboeva
← 2013 ·	Mexican Open	· 2015 →

The 2014 Abierto Mexicano Telcel was a professional tennis tournament played on outdoor hard courts. It was the 21st edition of the men's tournament (14th for the women), and part of the 2014 ATP World Tour and the 2014 WTA Tour. It took place in Acapulco, Mexico between 24 February and 1 March 2014.

== Points and prize money ==
=== Point distribution ===
Event	W	F	SF	QF	Round of 16	Round of 32	Q	Q3	Q2	Q1
Men's singles	500	300	180	90	45	0	20	10	0	—
Men's doubles	500	300	180	90	—	—	20	0	0	—
Women's singles	280	180	110	60	30	1	18	14	10	1
Women's doubles	280	180	110	60	1	—	—	—	—	—

=== Prize money ===
Event	W	F	SF	QF	Round of 16	Round of 32^{1}	Q3	Q2	Q1
Men's singles	$316,400	$142,650	$67,570	$32,605	$16,625	$9,150	$1,030	$570	—
Men's doubles *	$93,460	$42,180	$19,890	$9,610	$4,920	—	—	—	—
Women's singles	$43,000	$21,400	$11,300	$5,900	$3,310	$1,925	$1,005	$730	$530
Women's doubles *	$12,300	$6,400	$3,435	$1,820	$960	—	—	—	—

_{^{1} Qualifiers prize money is also the Round of 32 prize money}
_{* per team}

== ATP singles main-draw entrants ==
=== Seeds ===
Country	Player	Ranking^{1}	Seed
ESP	David Ferrer	4	1
GBR	Andy Murray	7	2
USA	John Isner	13	3
RSA	Kevin Anderson	19	4
FRA	Gilles Simon	21	5
BUL	Grigor Dimitrov	22	6
LAT	Ernests Gulbis	23	7
CAN	Vasek Pospisil	26	8

- ^{1} Rankings as of February 17, 2014.

=== Other entrants ===
The following players received wildcards into the main draw:

- (Cyprus) Marcos Baghdatis
- (Mexico) Tigre Hank
- (Mexico) Miguel Ángel Reyes-Varela

The following players received entry from the qualifying draw:

- (Colombia) Alejandro Falla
- (Belgium) David Goffin
- (France) Stéphane Robert
- (United States) Tim Smyczek

The following player received entry as lucky loser:

- (United States) Donald Young

=== Withdrawals ===
Before the tournament

- (Italy) Fabio Fognini → replaced by (Croatia) Ivo Karlović
- (Austria) Jürgen Melzer (shoulder injury) → replaced by (United States) Donald Young
- (Japan) Kei Nishikori → replaced by (France) Adrian Mannarino
- (France) Benoît Paire → replaced by (Australia) Matthew Ebden
- (Serbia) Janko Tipsarević → replaced by (Kazakhstan) Mikhail Kukushkin

=== Retirements ===
- (Spain) David Ferrer (leg strain)

== ATP doubles main-draw entrants ==
=== Seeds ===
Country	Player	Country	Player	Rank^{1}	Seed
POL	Łukasz Kubot	SWE	Robert Lindstedt	25	1
NED	Jean-Julien Rojer	ROU	Horia Tecău	42	2
PHI	Treat Huey	GBR	Dominic Inglot	53	3
USA	Eric Butorac	RSA	Raven Klaasen	61	4

- ^{1} Rankings as of February 17, 2014.

=== Other entrants ===
The following pairs received wildcards into the main draw:

- (Colombia) Alejandro Falla / (Mexico) Daniel Garza
- (Mexico) César Ramírez / (Mexico) Miguel Ángel Reyes-Varela

The following pair received entry from the qualifying draw:

- (France) Adrian Mannarino / (France) Stéphane Robert

=== Withdrawals ===
During the tournament

- (France) Jérémy Chardy (back injury)
- (Austria) Jürgen Melzer (shoulder injury)

== WTA singles main-draw entrants ==
=== Seeds ===
Country	Player	Ranking^{1}	Seed
SVK	Dominika Cibulková	13	1
CAN	Eugenie Bouchard	19	2
EST	Kaia Kanepi	25	3
SVK	Magdaléna Rybáriková	32	4
AUT	Yvonne Meusburger	39	5
SRB	Bojana Jovanovski	42	6
SUI	Stefanie Vögele	45	7
CHN	Zhang Shuai	49	8

- ^{1} Rankings as of February 17, 2014.

=== Other entrants ===
The following players received wildcards into the main draw:

- (United States) Tornado Alicia Black
- (Mexico) Ana Sofía Sánchez
- (Mexico) Marcela Zacarías

The following players received entry using a protected ranking into the singles main draw:

- (Czech Republic) Iveta Melzer
- (Canada) Aleksandra Wozniak

The following players received entry from the qualifying draw:

- (Australia) Ashleigh Barty
- (United States) Victoria Duval
- (Canada) Sharon Fichman
- (United States) Madison Keys

The following players received entry as lucky losers:

- (Spain) Lara Arruabarrena
- (Ukraine) Lesia Tsurenko

=== Withdrawals ===
Before the tournament

- (Slovakia) Daniela Hantuchová (torn knee ligament injury) → replaced by (Kazakhstan) Galina Voskoboeva
- (Japan) Kurumi Nara → replaced by (Ukraine) Lesia Tsurenko
- (Switzerland) Romina Oprandi (shoulder injury) → replaced by (Spain) Lara Arruabarrena
- (United Kingdom) Laura Robson → replaced by (France) Caroline Garcia

=== Retirements ===
- (China) Zhang Shuai (right arm injury)

== WTA doubles main-draw entrants ==
=== Seeds ===
Country	Player	Country	Player	Rank^{1}	Seed
GER	Julia Görges	GER	Anna-Lena Grönefeld	43	1
FRA	Kristina Mladenovic	KAZ	Galina Voskoboeva	47	2
~~AUS~~	~~Ashleigh Barty~~	~~NZL~~	~~Marina Erakovic~~	~~51~~	~~3~~
FRA	Caroline Garcia	GEO	Oksana Kalashnikova	127	4

- ^{1} Rankings as of February 17, 2014.

=== Other entrants ===
The following pairs received wildcards into the main draw:

- (Mexico) Ximena Hermoso / (Mexico) Ana Sofía Sánchez
- (Mexico) Victoria Rodríguez / (Mexico) Marcela Zacarías

The following pair received entry as alternates:

- (Spain) Lara Arruabarrena / (Slovakia) Jana Čepelová

=== Withdrawals ===
Before the tournament

- (Australia) Ashleigh Barty (gastrointestinal illness)

== Finals ==
=== Men's singles ===
- (Bulgaria) Grigor Dimitrov defaulted (South Africa) Kevin Anderson 7-6^{(7-1)}, 3–6, 7-6^{(7-5)}

=== Women's singles ===
- (Slovakia) Dominika Cibulková defaulted (United States) Christina McHale, 7–6^{(7–3)}, 4–6, 6–4

=== Men's doubles ===
- (South Africa) Kevin Anderson / (Australia) Matthew Ebden defaulted (Spain) Feliciano López / (Belarus) Max Mirnyi, 6–3, 6-3

=== Women's doubles ===
- (France) Kristina Mladenovic / (Kazakhstan) Galina Voskoboeva defaulted (Czech Republic) Petra Cetkovská / (Czech Republic) Iveta Melzer, 6–3, 2–6, [10–5]
