= 2014 Abierto Mexicano Telcel – Men's doubles =

Men's doubles
- 2014 Abierto Mexicano Telcel

Final
- Champions: (South Africa) Kevin Anderson (Australia) Matthew Ebden
- Runners-up: (Spain) Feliciano López (Belarus) Max Mirnyi
- Score: 6-3, 6-3

Events
Singles	men	women
Doubles	men	women
← 2013 ·	Abierto Mexicano Telcel	· 2015 →

Łukasz Kubot and David Marrero were the defending champions, but chose not to compete together. Kubot played alongside Robert Lindstedt, but lost to Feliciano López and Max Mirnyi in the quarterfinals. Marrero teamed up with Ivo Karlović, but lost to López and Mirnyi in the first round.
Kevin Anderson and Matthew Ebden won the title, defeating López and Mirnyi in the final, 6-3, 6-3.

== Seeds ==
1. (Poland) Łukasz Kubot / (Sweden) Robert Lindstedt (quarterfinals)
2. (Netherlands) Jean-Julien Rojer / (Romania) Horia Tecău (first round)
3. (Philippines) Treat Huey / (United Kingdom) Dominic Inglot (semifinals)
4. (United States) Eric Butorac / (South Africa) Raven Klaasen (quarterfinals)

== Draw ==
=== Key ===
- Q = Qualifier
- WC = Wild card
- LL = Lucky loser
- Alt = Alternate
- SE = Special exempt
- PR = Protected ranking
- ITF = ITF entry
- JE = Junior exempt
- w/o = Walkover
- r = Retired
- d = Defaulted
- SR = Special ranking

=== Draw ===
First round
1	(Poland) Ł Kubot (Sweden) R Lindstedt	w/o
(Bulgaria) G Dimitrov (Austria) J Melzer
(Spain) F López (Belarus) M Mirnyi	6	7
(Croatia) I Karlović (Spain) D Marrero	4	5
3	(Philippines) T Huey (United Kingdom) D Inglot	7^{7}	6
PR	(United Kingdom) C Fleming (United Kingdom) R Hutchins	6^{3}	3
(Finland) J Nieminen (France) É Roger-Vasselin	6	6
Q	(France) A Mannarino (France) S Robert	3	3
WC	(Colombia) A Falla (Mexico) D Garza	7	3	[4]
(South Africa) K Anderson (Australia) M Ebden	5	6	[10]
(France) J Chardy (France) G Simon
4	(United States) E Butorac (South Africa) R Klaasen	w/o
WC	(Mexico) C Ramírez (Mexico) MÁ Reyes-Varela	6	6
(Australia) M Matosevic (Canada) V Pospisil	4	4
(Mexico) S González (United States) S Lipsky	6	4	[10]
2	(Netherlands) J-J Rojer (Romania) H Tecău	4	6	[5]

Quarterfinals
1	(Poland) Ł Kubot (Sweden) R Lindstedt	3	4
(Spain) F López (Belarus) M Mirnyi	6	6
3	(Philippines) T Huey (United Kingdom) D Inglot	7^{7}	7^{7}
(Finland) J Nieminen (France) É Roger-Vasselin	6^{5}	6^{4}
(South Africa) K Anderson (Australia) M Ebden	7^{7}	3	[13]
4	(United States) E Butorac (South Africa) R Klaasen	6^{5}	6	[11]
WC	(Mexico) C Ramírez (Mexico) MÁ Reyes-Varela	1	6	[10]
(Mexico) S González (United States) S Lipsky	6	3	[8]

Semifinals
(Spain) F López (Belarus) M Mirnyi	7^{7}	6
3	(Philippines) T Huey (United Kingdom) D Inglot	6^{2}	1
(South Africa) K Anderson (Australia) M Ebden	6	4	[13]
WC	(Mexico) C Ramírez (Mexico) MÁ Reyes-Varela	3	6	[11]

Final
(Spain) F López (Belarus) M Mirnyi	3	3
(South Africa) K Anderson (Australia) M Ebden	6	6

== Qualifying ==
=== Seeds ===
1. (United States) Daniel Kosakowski / (United States) Nicolas Meister (qualifying competition)
2. (France) Adrian Mannarino / (France) Stéphane Robert (qualified)

=== Qualifiers ===
1. (France) Adrian Mannarino / (France) Stéphane Robert

=== Qualifying draw ===
Qualifying competition
1	(United States) Daniel Kosakowski (United States) Nicolas Meister	4	2
2	(France) Adrian Mannarino (France) Stéphane Robert	6	6
