= 2015 Abierto Mexicano Telcel =

- Date: 23–28 February
- Edition: 22nd (men) / 15th (women)
- Draw: 32S / 16D
- Prize money: $1,548,755 (ATP) $250,000 (WTA)
- Surface: Hard
- Location: Acapulco, Mexico
- Venue: Fairmont Acapulco Princess

Champions

Men's singles
- (Spain) David Ferrer

Women's singles
- (Switzerland) Timea Bacsinszky

Men's doubles
- (Croatia) Ivan Dodig / (Brazil) Marcelo Melo

Women's doubles
- (Spain) Lara Arruabarrena / (Spain) María Teresa Torró Flor
← 2014 ·	Mexican Open	· 2016 →

The 2015 Abierto Mexicano Telcel was a professional tennis tournament played on outdoor hard courts. It was the 22nd edition of the men's tournament (15th for the women), and part of the 2015 ATP World Tour and the 2015 WTA Tour. It took place in Acapulco, Mexico between 23 and 28 February 2015, at the Fairmont Acapulco Princess.

== Points and prize money ==
=== Point distribution ===
Event	W	F	SF	QF	Round of 16	Round of 32	Q	Q3	Q2	Q1
Men's singles	500	300	180	90	45	0	20	10	0	—
Men's doubles	500	300	180	90	—	—	20	0	0	—
Women's singles	280	180	110	60	30	1	18	14	10	1
Women's doubles	280	180	110	60	1	—	—	—	—	—

=== Prize money ===
Event	W	F	SF	QF	Round of 16	Round of 32^{1}	Q3	Q2	Q1
Men's singles	$343,000	$154,620	$73,240	$35,340	$18,020	$9,910	—	$1,115	$615
Men's doubles *	$101,310	$45,710	$21,550	$10,420	$5,350	—	—	—	—
Women's singles	$43,000	$21,400	$11,300	$5,900	$3,310	$1,925	$1,005	$730	$530
Women's doubles *	$12,300	$6,400	$3,435	$1,820	$960	—	—	—	—

_{^{1} Qualifiers prize money is also the Round of 32 prize money}
_{* per team}

== ATP singles main-draw entrants ==
=== Seeds ===
Country	Player	Ranking^{1}	Seed
JPN	Kei Nishikori	5	1
ESP	David Ferrer	9	2
BUL	Grigor Dimitrov	10	3
RSA	Kevin Anderson	15	4
UKR	Alexandr Dolgopolov	24	5
CRO	Ivo Karlović	29	6
COL	Santiago Giraldo	33	7
GER	Benjamin Becker	40	8

- ^{1} Rankings as of February 16, 2015.

=== Other entrants ===
The following players received wildcards into the main draw:

- (South Africa) Kevin Anderson
- (Mexico) Daniel Garza
- (Colombia) Santiago Giraldo

The following players received entry from the qualifying draw:

- (Colombia) Alejandro González
- (United States) Ryan Harrison
- (Australia) Thanasi Kokkinakis
- (United States) Austin Krajicek

=== Withdrawals ===
Before the tournament

- (Croatia) Marin Čilić → replaced by (Serbia) Viktor Troicki
- (Czech Republic) Radek Štěpánek → replaced by (Germany) Dustin Brown
- (Serbia) Janko Tipsarević → replaced by (Croatia) Ivan Dodig

=== Retirements ===
- (United States) Donald Young (left elbow injury)

== ATP doubles main-draw entrants ==
=== Seeds ===
Country	Player	Country	Player	Rank^{1}	Seed
CRO	Ivan Dodig	BRA	Marcelo Melo	12	1
ESP	Marcel Granollers	ESP	Marc López	23	2
AUT	Alexander Peya	BRA	Bruno Soares	24	3
COL	Juan Sebastián Cabal	COL	Robert Farah	39	4

- ^{1} Rankings as of February 16, 2015.

=== Other entrants ===
The following pairs received wildcards into the main draw:

- (Mexico) Tigre Hank / (Mexico) Manuel Sánchez
- (Mexico) César Ramírez / (Mexico) Miguel Ángel Reyes-Varela

The following pair received entry from the qualifying draw:

- (Germany) Dustin Brown / (Germany) Tobias Kamke

== WTA singles main-draw entrants ==
=== Seeds ===
Country	Player	Ranking^{1}	Seed
RUS	Maria Sharapova	2	1
ITA	Sara Errani	16	2
FRA	Caroline Garcia	30	3
~~ROU~~	~~Irina-Camelia Begu~~	~~34~~	~~4~~
SUI	Timea Bacsinszky	36	5
ITA	Roberta Vinci	38	6
USA	Sloane Stephens	41	7
USA	Madison Brengle	45	8
~~SVK~~	~~Daniela Hantuchová~~	~~47~~	~~9~~
CRO	Ajla Tomljanović	49	10

- ^{1} Rankings as of February 16, 2015.

=== Other entrants ===
The following players received wildcards into the main draw:

- (Czech Republic) Marie Bouzková
- (Mexico) Ana Sofía Sánchez
- (Mexico) Marcela Zacarías

The following players received entry from the qualifying draw:

- (Romania) Elena Bogdan
- (United States) Louisa Chirico
- (Netherlands) Richèl Hogenkamp
- (Czech Republic) Lucie Hradecká

The following players received entry as lucky losers:

- (Colombia) Mariana Duque Mariño
- (Bulgaria) Sesil Karatantcheva

=== Withdrawals ===
Before the tournament

- (Romania) Irina-Camelia Begu (rib injury) → replaced by (Colombia) Mariana Duque Mariño
- (Slovakia) Jana Čepelová → replaced by (United States) Shelby Rogers
- (Slovakia) Daniela Hantuchová (right foot injury) → replaced by (Bulgaria) Sesil Karatantcheva
- (United States) Madison Keys → replaced by (Netherlands) Kiki Bertens
- (Italy) Karin Knapp → replaced by (Slovenia) Polona Hercog
- (United States) Christina McHale → replaced by (Sweden) Johanna Larsson
- (Romania) Monica Niculescu → replaced by (Spain) María Teresa Torró Flor
- (United States) Alison Riske → replaced by (United States) Madison Brengle
- (Spain) Sílvia Soler Espinosa → replaced by (Serbia) Aleksandra Krunić
- (China) Zhang Shuai → replaced by (Slovakia) Anna Karolína Schmiedlová

During the tournament

- (Russia) Maria Sharapova (stomach virus)

=== Retirements ===
- (Croatia) Mirjana Lučić-Baroni (viral illness)
- (Italy) Roberta Vinci (right shoulder injury)

== WTA doubles main-draw entrants ==
=== Seeds ===
Country	Player	Country	Player	Rank^{1}	Seed
CZE	Andrea Hlaváčková	CZE	Lucie Hradecká	43	1
ESP	Lara Arruabarrena	ESP	María Teresa Torró Flor	130	2
NED	Kiki Bertens	SWE	Johanna Larsson	147	3
TPE	Chan Chin-wei	FRA	Laura Thorpe	187	4

- ^{1} Rankings as of February 16, 2015.

=== Other entrants ===
The following pair received wildcards into the main draw:

- (Mexico) Carolina Betancourt / (Mexico) Adriana Guzmán

=== Retirements ===
- (United States) Lauren Davis (left abdominal injury)

== Finals ==
=== Men's singles ===
- (Spain) David Ferrer defeated (Japan) Kei Nishikori, 6–3, 7–5

=== Women's singles ===
- (Switzerland) Timea Bacsinszky defeated (France) Caroline Garcia, 6–3, 6–0

=== Men's doubles ===
- (Croatia) Ivan Dodig / (Brazil) Marcelo Melo defeated (Poland) Mariusz Fyrstenberg / (Mexico) Santiago González, 7–6^{(7–2)}, 5–7, [10–3]

=== Women's doubles ===
- (Spain) Lara Arruabarrena / (Spain) María Teresa Torró Flor defeated (Czech Republic) Andrea Hlaváčková / (Czech Republic) Lucie Hradecká, 7–6^{(7–2)}, 5–7, [13–11]
