= 2012 Abierto Mexicano Telcel – Men's singles =

Men's singles
- 2012 Abierto Mexicano Telcel

Final
- Champion: (Spain) David Ferrer
- Runner-up: (Spain) Fernando Verdasco
- Score: 6–1, 6–2

Events
Singles	men	women
Doubles	men	women
- Abierto Mexicano Telcel

Defending champion David Ferrer defeated Fernando Verdasco in the final, 6–1, 6–2 to win the men's singles tennis title at the 2012 Mexican Open.

== Seeds ==
1. (Spain) David Ferrer (champion)
2. (Spain) Nicolás Almagro (quarterfinals)
3. (France) Gilles Simon (first round)
4. (Japan) Kei Nishikori (second round)
5. (Germany) Florian Mayer (second round)
6. (Argentina) Juan Mónaco (first round, retired due to dehydration)
7. (Spain) Marcel Granollers (second round)
8. (Spain) Fernando Verdasco (final)

== Draw ==
Key

- Q = Qualifier
- WC = Wild card
- LL = Lucky loser
- Alt = Alternate
- ITF = ITF entry
- PR = Protected ranking
- SR = Special ranking
- SE = Special exempt
- JE = Junior exempt
- JR = Junior Accelerator Programme entrant
- CO = College Accelerator Programme entrant
- NG = Next Gen Accelerator Program entrant
- w/o = Walkover
- r = Retired
- d = Defaulted

=== Finals ===
Semifinals
1	(Spain) David Ferrer	7	6
(Colombia) Santiago Giraldo	5	4
(Switzerland) Stanislas Wawrinka	3	3
8	(Spain) Fernando Verdasco	6	6

Final
1	(Spain) David Ferrer	6	6
8	(Spain) Fernando Verdasco	1	2

=== Top half ===
First round
1	(Spain) D Ferrer	6	6
WC	(Mexico) S González	1	2
(Poland) Ł Kubot	6	6
WC	(Mexico) D Garza	1	3
(Argentina) L Mayer	6^{5}	3
(Spain) P Andújar	7^{7}	6
Q	(Argentina) F Bagnis	2	4
5	(Germany) F Mayer	6	6
3	(France) G Simon	6^{3}	3
(Argentina) C Berlocq	7^{5}	6
Q	(Italy) A Giannessi	2	5
(Italy) P Starace	6	7
WC	(Argentina) D Nalbandian	2	2
(Colombia) S Giraldo	6	6
(Brazil) T Bellucci	4	2
7	(Spain) M Granollers	6	6

Second round
1	(Spain) D Ferrer	6	6
(Poland) Ł Kubot	3	3
(Spain) P Andújar	4	7	6
5	(Germany) F Mayer	6	5	4
(Argentina) C Berlocq	6	6
(Italy) P Starace	1	4
(Colombia) S Giraldo	6	6
7	(Spain) M Granollers	4	3

Quarterfinals
1	(Spain) D Ferrer	6	6
(Spain) P Andújar	2	4
(Argentina) C Berlocq	5	6	4
(Colombia) S Giraldo	7	3	6

Semifinals
1	(Spain) D Ferrer	7	6
(Colombia) S Giraldo	5	4

=== Bottom half ===
First round
6	(Argentina) J Mónaco	6^{2}	3^{r}
(Spain) A Ramos	7^{7}	5
(Spain) JC Ferrero	6	3	4
(Switzerland) S Wawrinka	2	6	6
(France) J Chardy	7^{7}	6
(Portugal) R Machado	6^{4}	3
(Spain) A Montañés	2	1^{r}
4	(Japan) K Nishikori	6	4
8	(Spain) F Verdasco	6	6
(Italy) F Volandri	0	2
(Argentina) JI Chela	6	6
WC	(Mexico) C Ramírez	0	2
Q	(Colombia) JS Cabal	6^{3}	6^{6}
(France) B Paire	7^{7}	7^{8}
Q	(Spain) P Riba	2	6	2
2	(Spain) N Almagro	6	3	6

Second round
(Spain) A Ramos	3	6	3
(Switzerland) S Wawrinka	6	3	6
(France) J Chardy	1	7^{10}	6
4	(Japan) K Nishikori	6	6^{8}	0
8	(Spain) F Verdasco	6	6
(Argentina) JI Chela	4	2
(France) B Paire	6	3	4
2	(Spain) N Almagro	3	6	6

Quarterfinals
(Switzerland) S Wawrinka	7	6
(France) J Chardy	5	1
8	(Spain) F Verdasco	6	7^{7}
2	(Spain) N Almagro	4	6^{5}

Semifinals
(Switzerland) S Wawrinka	3	3
8	(Spain) F Verdasco	6	6

== Qualifying ==
=== Seeds ===
1. (Spain) Pere Riba (qualified)
2. (Romania) Victor Hănescu (first round)
3. (Brazil) João Souza (qualifying competition)
4. (Russia) Igor Andreev (qualifying competition)
5. (Chile) Paul Capdeville (qualifying competition)
6. (Italy) Alessandro Giannessi (qualified)
7. (Argentina) Facundo Bagnis (qualified)
8. (Argentina) Eduardo Schwank (first round)

=== Qualifiers ===
1. (Spain) Pere Riba
2. (Colombia) Juan Sebastián Cabal
3. (Italy) Alessandro Giannessi
4. (Argentina) Facundo Bagnis

=== Draw ===
==== First qualifier ====
First round
1	(Spain) Pere Riba	6	6
(Mexico) Miguel Gallardo-Vallés	1	0
(Guatemala) Christopher Díaz Figueroa	5	1
5	(Chile) Paul Capdeville	7	6

Qualifying competition
1	(Spain) Pere Riba	7	7
5	(Chile) Paul Capdeville	5	5

==== Second qualifier ====
First round
2	(Romania) Victor Hănescu	4	0^{r}
(Colombia) Juan Sebastián Cabal	6	0
Alt	(Canada) Pierre-Ludovic Duclos	6	6
8	(Argentina) Eduardo Schwank	4	0

Qualifying competition
(Colombia) Juan Sebastián Cabal	6	6
Alt	(Canada) Pierre-Ludovic Duclos	4	1

==== Third qualifier ====
First round
3	(Brazil) João Souza	6	6
WC	(Mexico) Luis Patiño	2	0
Alt	(Mexico) Luis Díaz-Barriga	2	3
6	(Italy) Alessandro Giannessi	6	6

Qualifying competition
3	(Brazil) João Souza	3	6	1
6	(Italy) Alessandro Giannessi	6	3	6

==== Fourth qualifier ====
First round
4	(Russia) Igor Andreev	7	6
WC	(Mexico) Marco Aurelio Núñez	5	1
WC	(Mexico) Manuel Sánchez	4	4
7	(Argentina) Facundo Bagnis	6	6

Qualifying competition
4	(Russia) Igor Andreev	6^{5}	6^{3}
7	(Argentina) Facundo Bagnis	7^{7}	7^{7}
