= 2012 Abierto Mexicano Telcel – Men's doubles =

Men's doubles
- 2012 Abierto Mexicano Telcel

Final
- Champions: (Spain) David Marrero (Spain) Fernando Verdasco
- Runners-up: (Spain) Marcel Granollers (Spain) Marc López
- Score: 6–3, 6–4

Events
Singles	men	women
Doubles	men	women
← 2011 ·	Abierto Mexicano Telcel	· 2013 →

Victor Hănescu and Horia Tecău were the defending champions but decided not to participate.
David Marrero and Fernando Verdasco won the title by defeating Marcel Granollers and Marc López 6–3, 6–4 in the final.

== Seeds ==
1. (Czech Republic) František Čermák / (Slovakia) Filip Polášek (semifinals)
2. (Mexico) Santiago González / (Germany) Christopher Kas (first round)
3. (United States) Eric Butorac / (Brazil) Bruno Soares (first round)
4. (Italy) Daniele Bracciali / (Colombia) Juan Sebastián Cabal (quarterfinals)

== Draw ==
=== Key ===
- Q = Qualifier
- WC = Wild card
- LL = Lucky loser
- Alt = Alternate
- SE = Special exempt
- PR = Protected ranking
- ITF = ITF entry
- JE = Junior exempt
- w/o = Walkover
- r = Retired
- d = Defaulted
- SR = Special ranking

=== Draw ===
First round
1	(Czech Republic) F Čermák (Slovakia) F Polášek	6	7^{7}
WC	(Mexico) D Garza (Colombia) S Giraldo	3	6^{4}
Alt	(Brazil) J Souza (Italy) F Volandri	6	6^{4}	[10]
(Poland) Ł Kubot (Germany) F Mayer	2	7^{7}	[7]
4	(Italy) D Bracciali (Colombia) JS Cabal	7^{7}	7
(Brazil) T Bellucci (Brazil) M Melo	6^{3}	5
(Spain) M Granollers (Spain) M López	6	6
(Spain) P Andújar (Argentina) C Berlocq	3	4
(Argentina) JI Chela (Argentina) E Schwank	6	5	[10]
Alt	(Portugal) R Machado (Spain) P Riba	2	7	[8]
(Spain) D Ferrer (Spain) A Ramos	7^{7}	7
3	(United States) E Butorac (Brazil) B Soares	6^{1}	5
WC	(Mexico) L Díaz-Barriga (Mexico) C Ramírez	1	1
(Spain) D Marrero (Spain) F Verdasco	6	6
(France) J Chardy (France) G Simon	7^{8}	6
2	(Mexico) S González (Germany) C Kas	6^{6}	4

Quarterfinals
1	(Czech Republic) F Čermák (Slovakia) F Polášek	6	6
Alt	(Brazil) J Souza (Italy) F Volandri	1	4
4	(Italy) D Bracciali (Colombia) JS Cabal	7	1	[7]
(Spain) M Granollers (Spain) M López	5	6	[10]
(Argentina) JI Chela (Argentina) E Schwank	w/o
(Spain) D Ferrer (Spain) A Ramos
(Spain) D Marrero (Spain) F Verdasco	3	6	[10]
(France) J Chardy (France) G Simon	6	3	[6]

Semifinals
1	(Czech Republic) F Čermák (Slovakia) F Polášek	1	5
(Spain) M Granollers (Spain) M López	6	7
(Argentina) JI Chela (Argentina) E Schwank	6^{6}	6^{6}
(Spain) D Marrero (Spain) F Verdasco	7^{8}	7^{8}

Final
(Spain) M Granollers (Spain) M López	3	4
(Spain) D Marrero (Spain) F Verdasco	6	6
