= 2014 Abierto Mexicano Telcel – Women's singles =

Women's singles
- 2014 Abierto Mexicano Telcel

Final
- Champion: (Slovakia) Dominika Cibulková
- Runner-up: (United States) Christina McHale
- Score: 7–6^{(7–3)}, 4–6, 6–4

Details
- Draw: 32
- Seeds: 8

Events
Singles	men	women
Doubles	men	women
- Abierto Mexicano Telcel

Sara Errani was the two-time defending champion, but chose not to participate.
Dominika Cibulková won the title, defeating Christina McHale in the final, 7–6^{(7–3)}, 4–6, 6–4.

== Seeds ==
1. (Slovakia) Dominika Cibulková (champion)
2. (Canada) Eugenie Bouchard (quarterfinals)
3. (Estonia) Kaia Kanepi (quarterfinals)
4. (Slovakia) Magdaléna Rybáriková (first round)

5. (Austria) Yvonne Meusburger (first round)
6. (Serbia) Bojana Jovanovski (second round)
7. (Switzerland) Stefanie Vögele (first round)
8. (China) Zhang Shuai (semifinals, retired)

== Draw ==
Key

- Q = Qualifier
- WC = Wild card
- LL = Lucky loser
- Alt = Alternate
- ITF = ITF entry
- PR = Protected ranking
- SR = Special ranking
- SE = Special exempt
- JE = Junior exempt
- JR = Junior Accelerator Programme entrant
- CO = College Accelerator Programme entrant
- NG = Next Gen Accelerator Program entrant
- w/o = Walkover
- r = Retired
- d = Defaulted

=== Finals ===
Semifinals
1	(Slovakia) Dominika Cibulková	4
8	(China) Zhang Shuai	2^{r}
(United States) Christina McHale	3	6	7
(France) Caroline Garcia	6	2	5

Final
1	(Slovakia) Dominika Cibulková	7^{7}	4	6
(United States) Christina McHale	6^{3}	6	4

=== Top half ===
First round
1	(Slovakia) D Cibulková	6	6
(Poland) U Radwańska	3	4
LL	(Ukraine) L Tsurenko	6^{4}	4
(Belgium) Y Wickmayer	7^{7}	6
(New Zealand) M Erakovic	6	6
WC	(Mexico) AS Sánchez	2	2
WC	(United States) TA Black	4	5
6	(Serbia) B Jovanovski	6	7
4	(Slovakia) M Rybáriková	1	3
(Croatia) A Tomljanović	6	6
PR	(Czech Republic) I Melzer	2	4
Q	(United States) V Duval	6	6
PR	(Canada) A Wozniak	7^{7}	5	6
Q	(Australia) A Barty	6^{5}	7	2
Q	(United States) M Keys	6	1	4
8	(China) S Zhang	4	6	6

Second round
1	(Slovakia) D Cibulková	7	6
(Belgium) Y Wickmayer	5	2
(New Zealand) M Erakovic	6	6
6	(Serbia) B Jovanovski	1	4
(Croatia) A Tomljanović	6	6
Q	(United States) V Duval	3	0
PR	(Canada) A Wozniak	1	4
8	(China) S Zhang	6	6

Quarterfinals
1	(Slovakia) D Cibulková	6	7
(New Zealand) M Erakovic	4	5
(Croatia) A Tomljanović	1	7	2
8	(China) S Zhang	6	5	6

Semifinals
1	(Slovakia) D Cibulková	4
8	(China) S Zhang	2^{r}

=== Bottom half ===
First round
7	(Switzerland) S Vögele	6	6^{5}	4
(Japan) K Date-Krumm	3	7^{7}	6
(France) K Mladenovic	4	2
(United States) C McHale	6	6
(Germany) J Görges	6	6
WC	(Mexico) M Zacarías	0	1
(Slovakia) J Čepelová	1	6	2
3	(Estonia) K Kanepi	6	3	6
5	(Austria) Y Meusburger	1	3
Q	(Canada) S Fichman	6	6
(Spain) L Domínguez Lino	4	6^{6}
(France) C Garcia	6	7^{8}
LL	(Spain) L Arruabarrena	6	6
(Kazakhstan) G Voskoboeva	2	4
(Israel) S Pe'er	2	2
2	(Canada) E Bouchard	6	6

Second round
(Japan) K Date-Krumm	5	1
(United States) C McHale	7	6
(Germany) J Görges	7^{7}	4	6^{6}
3	(Estonia) K Kanepi	6^{4}	6	7^{8}
Q	(Canada) S Fichman	2	5
(France) C Garcia	6	7
LL	(Spain) L Arruabarrena	5	2
2	(Canada) E Bouchard	7	6

Quarterfinals
(United States) C McHale	6	2	6
3	(Estonia) K Kanepi	1	6	4
(France) C Garcia	3	6	6
2	(Canada) E Bouchard	6	4	1

Semifinals
(United States) C McHale	3	6	7
(France) C Garcia	6	2	5

== Qualifying ==
=== Seeds ===
1. (United States) Madison Keys (qualified)
2. (United States) Lauren Davis (second round)
3. (Czech Republic) Petra Cetkovská (withdrew)
4. (Canada) Sharon Fichman (qualified)
5. (United States) Coco Vandeweghe (first round)
6. (Georgia (country)) Anna Tatishvili (first round)
7. (Serbia) Vesna Dolonc (first round, retired)
8. (United States) Shelby Rogers (second round)
9. (United Kingdom) Johanna Konta (second round)

=== Qualifiers ===
1. (United States) Madison Keys
2. (Australia) Ashleigh Barty
3. (United States) Victoria Duval
4. (Canada) Sharon Fichman

=== Lucky losers ===
1. (Spain) Lara Arruabarrena
2. (Ukraine) Lesia Tsurenko

=== Qualifying draw ===
==== First qualifier ====
First round
1	(United States) Madison Keys	6	6
WC	(Mexico) Victoria Rodríguez	0	2
(Russia) Alisa Kleybanova	7^{7}	6
(United States) Sachia Vickery	6^{3}	1
(Spain) Lara Arruabarrena	6	6
(Canada) Gabriela Dabrowski	2	1
(Japan) Risa Ozaki	2	6	7
5	(United States) Coco Vandeweghe	6	3	5

Second round
1	(United States) Madison Keys	6	7^{7}
(Russia) Alisa Kleybanova	4	6^{2}
(Spain) Lara Arruabarrena	6	5	6
(Japan) Risa Ozaki	2	7	2

Qualifying competition
1	(United States) Madison Keys	6	6
(Spain) Lara Arruabarrena	1	0

==== Second qualifier ====
First round
2	(United States) Lauren Davis	6	6
WC	(Mexico) Ximena Hermoso	1	3
WC	(Japan) Naomi Osaka	2	4
(Australia) Ashleigh Barty	6	6
(United States) Maria Sanchez	3	4
(Ukraine) Lesia Tsurenko	6	6
(United States) Irina Falconi	6	3
7	(Serbia) Vesna Dolonc	4	2^{r}

Second round
2	(United States) Lauren Davis	6	3	5
(Australia) Ashleigh Barty	2	6	7
(Ukraine) Lesia Tsurenko	6	6
(United States) Irina Falconi	0	1

Qualifying competition
(Australia) Ashleigh Barty	6	6
(Ukraine) Lesia Tsurenko	0	2

==== Third qualifier ====
First round
9	(United Kingdom) Johanna Konta	6	6
(Ukraine) Maryna Zanevska	0	1
(Switzerland) Belinda Bencic	3	7^{9}	6
(Australia) Olivia Rogowska	6	6^{7}	3
(United Kingdom) Heather Watson	2	1^{r}
(United States) Victoria Duval	6	2
Alt	(France) Amandine Hesse	6	7^{7}
6	(Georgia (country)) Anna Tatishvili	2	6^{2}

Second round
9	(United Kingdom) Johanna Konta	7	4	1
(Switzerland) Belinda Bencic	5	6	6
(United States) Victoria Duval	7^{7}	6
Alt	(France) Amandine Hesse	6^{2}	4

Qualifying competition
(Switzerland) Belinda Bencic	7^{10}	0	6^{5}
(United States) Victoria Duval	6^{8}	6	7^{7}

==== Fourth qualifier ====
First round
4	(Canada) Sharon Fichman	6	6
(Japan) Sachie Ishizu	1	4
(United States) Madison Brengle	6	6
(France) Stéphanie Foretz Gacon	3	1
(Kazakhstan) Yulia Putintseva	5	2
(United States) Allie Kiick	7	6
(France) Mathilde Johansson	6^{4}	5
8	(United States) Shelby Rogers	7^{7}	7

Second round
4	(Canada) Sharon Fichman	6	6
(United States) Madison Brengle	1	0
(United States) Allie Kiick	2	7	6
8	(United States) Shelby Rogers	6	5	4

Qualifying competition
4	(Canada) Sharon Fichman	6	4	6
(United States) Allie Kiick	1	6	1
