= 2012 Abierto Mexicano Telcel – Women's singles =

Women's singles
- 2012 Abierto Mexicano Telcel

Final
- Champion: (Italy) Sara Errani
- Runner-up: (Italy) Flavia Pennetta
- Score: 5–7, 7–6^{(7–2)}, 6–0

Details
- Draw: 32
- Seeds: 8

Events
Singles	men	women
Doubles	men	women
- Abierto Mexicano Telcel

Sara Errani defeated Flavia Pennetta in the final, 5–7, 7–6^{(7–2)}, 6–0 to win the women's singles tennis title at the 2012 Mexican Open.

Gisela Dulko was the reigning champion, but withdrew due to gastrointestinal illness.

== Seeds ==
1. (Italy) Roberta Vinci (semifinals)
2. (Italy) Flavia Pennetta (final)
3. (Italy) Sara Errani (champion)
4. (Romania) Irina-Camelia Begu (semifinals)
5. (Romania) Alexandra Dulgheru (first round)
6. (Sweden) Johanna Larsson (second round)
7. (Argentina) Gisela Dulko (withdrew due to gastro-intestinal illness)
8. (Italy) Alberta Brianti (second round)

== Draw ==
Key

- Q = Qualifier
- WC = Wild card
- LL = Lucky loser
- Alt = Alternate
- ITF = ITF entry
- PR = Protected ranking
- SR = Special ranking
- SE = Special exempt
- JE = Junior exempt
- JR = Junior Accelerator Programme entrant
- CO = College Accelerator Programme entrant
- NG = Next Gen Accelerator Program entrant
- w/o = Walkover
- r = Retired
- d = Defaulted

=== Finals ===
Semifinals
1	(Italy) Roberta Vinci	4	1
3	(Italy) Sara Errani	6	6
4	(Romania) Irina-Camelia Begu	2	2
2	(Italy) Flavia Pennetta	6	6

Final
3	(Italy) Sara Errani	5	7^{7}	6
2	(Italy) Flavia Pennetta	7	6^{2}	0

=== Top half ===
First round
1	(Italy) R Vinci	6	7^{7}
WC	(Spain) S Soler-Espinosa	2	6^{5}
(France) M Johansson	4	6^{5}
(France) S Foretz Gacon	6	7^{7}
(Netherlands) M Krajicek	7	3	6
(Romania) A Cadanțu	5	6	3
(France) A Cornet	6	3	3
8	(Italy) A Brianti	3	6	6
3	(Italy) S Errani	6	6
(United States) I Falconi	1	1
Q	(Romania) E Gallovits-Hall	7	7
(Hungary) G Arn	5	5
(Canada) S Dubois	6^{6}	3
(Hungary) M Czink	7^{8}	6
(Spain) L Domínguez Lino	4	4
LL	(Spain) E Cabeza Candela	6	6

Second round
1	(Italy) R Vinci	7	6
(France) S Foretz Gacon	5	4
(Netherlands) M Krajicek	6	3	7^{7}
8	(Italy) A Brianti	3	6	6^{2}
3	(Italy) S Errani	6	6
Q	(Romania) E Gallovits-Hall	4	1
(Hungary) M Czink	4	6^{5}
LL	(Spain) E Cabeza Candela	6	7^{7}

Quarterfinals
1	(Italy) R Vinci	6	6
(Netherlands) M Krajicek	2	0
3	(Italy) S Errani	6	6
LL	(Spain) E Cabeza Candela	4	3

Semifinals
1	(Italy) R Vinci	4	1
3	(Italy) S Errani	6	6

=== Bottom half ===
First round
5	(Romania) A Dulgheru	6	5	6^{3}
(Slovakia) M Rybáriková	2	7	7^{7}
WC	(Mexico) X Hermoso	7	6
(Austria) P Mayr-Achleitner	5	3
(Czech Republic) E Birnerová	4	6	3
(Georgia (country)) A Tatishvili	6	4	6
PR	(Switzerland) T Bacsinszky	6^{3}	6	4
4	(Romania) I-C Begu	7^{7}	3	6
6	(Sweden) J Larsson	1	6	6
Q	(Kazakhstan) S Karatantcheva	6	4	3
WC	(Mexico) N Abdalá	1	0
Q	(Colombia) M Duque-Mariño	6	6
(Sweden) S Arvidsson	6	6
Q	(Slovenia) P Rampre	2	4
(Spain) A Parra Santonja	4	2
2	(Italy) F Pennetta	6	6

Second round
(Slovakia) M Rybáriková	6	3	6
WC	(Mexico) X Hermoso	3	6	3
(Georgia (country)) A Tatishvili	3	1
4	(Romania) I-C Begu	6	6
6	(Sweden) J Larsson	6	1	3
Q	(Colombia) M Duque-Mariño	4	6	6
(Sweden) S Arvidsson	6	6^{5}	1
2	(Italy) F Pennetta	2	7^{7}	6

Quarterfinals
(Slovakia) M Rybáriková	1	2
4	(Romania) I-C Begu	6	6
Q	(Colombia) M Duque-Mariño	0	4
2	(Italy) F Pennetta	6	6

Semifinals
4	(Romania) I-C Begu	2	2
2	(Italy) F Pennetta	6	6

== Qualifying ==
=== Seeds ===
1. (Romania) Edina Gallovits-Hall (qualified)
2. (Spain) Lara Arruabarrena-Vecino (first round)
3. (Argentina) Paula Ormaechea (first round)
4. (France) Aravane Rezaï (first round)
5. (Kazakhstan) Sesil Karatantcheva (qualified)
6. (Russia) Anastasia Pivovarova (first round)
7. (Romania) Mihaela Buzărnescu (first round)
8. (United States) Julia Cohen (first round)

=== Qualifiers ===
1. (Romania) Edina Gallovits-Hall
2. (Slovenia) Petra Rampre
3. (Colombia) Mariana Duque-Mariño
4. (Kazakhstan) Sesil Karatantcheva

=== Lucky losers ===
1. (Spain) Estrella Cabeza Candela

=== Draw ===
==== First qualifier ====
First round
1	(Romania) Edina Gallovits-Hall	6	6
(France) Victoria Larrière	0	0
(Paraguay) Verónica Cepede Royg	6	6
(Ukraine) Mariya Koryttseva	3	4
(Canada) Sharon Fichman	4	3
(Argentina) Florencia Molinero	6	6
(Kazakhstan) Yaroslava Shvedova	6	4	6
8	(United States) Julia Cohen	4	6	0

Second round
1	(Romania) Edina Gallovits-Hall	7	7^{7}
(Paraguay) Verónica Cepede Royg	5	6^{5}
(Argentina) Florencia Molinero	4	1
(Kazakhstan) Yaroslava Shvedova	6	6

Qualifying competition
1	(Romania) Edina Gallovits-Hall	4	6	0
(Kazakhstan) Yaroslava Shvedova	6	1	0^{r}

==== Second qualifier ====
First round
2	(Spain) Lara Arruabarrena-Vecino	1	4
(Italy) Maria Elena Camerin	6	6
(Spain) Leticia Costas-Moreira	5	6	2^{r}
(Slovenia) Petra Rampre	7	4	3
(Spain) Estrella Cabeza Candela	6	6
WC	(Mexico) Ana Sofía Sánchez	0	3
(Spain) Garbiñe Muguruza Blanco	6	6
7	(Romania) Mihaela Buzărnescu	4	3

Second round
(Italy) Maria Elena Camerin	4	4
(Slovenia) Petra Rampre	6	6
(Spain) Estrella Cabeza Candela	3	7	6
(Spain) Garbiñe Muguruza Blanco	6	5	4

Qualifying competition
(Slovenia) Petra Rampre	6	6
(Spain) Estrella Cabeza Candela	3	4

==== Third qualifier ====
First round
3	(Argentina) Paula Ormaechea	2	4
(Colombia) Mariana Duque-Mariño	6	6
(Spain) Inés Ferrer Suárez	6	6
WC	(Mexico) Valeria Salazar	2	0
(Slovakia) Lenka Wienerová	6	3	7
(Bulgaria) Aleksandrina Naydenova	2	6	5
(Colombia) Catalina Castaño	6	3	6
6	(Russia) Anastasia Pivovarova	4	6	3

Second round
(Colombia) Mariana Duque-Mariño	6	6
(Spain) Inés Ferrer Suárez	2	0
(Slovakia) Lenka Wienerová	5	4
(Colombia) Catalina Castaño	7	6

Qualifying competition
(Colombia) Mariana Duque-Mariño	6	6
(Colombia) Catalina Castaño	1	3

==== Fourth qualifier ====
First round
4	(France) Aravane Rezaï	2	6	4
WC	(Mexico) Marcela Zacarías	6	3	6
(Chile) Andrea Koch-Benvenuto	1^{r}
(Portugal) Maria João Koehler	5
WC	(Mexico) Ana Paula de la Peña	1	0
(Netherlands) Kiki Bertens	6	6
(Germany) Tatjana Malek	2	4
5	(Kazakhstan) Sesil Karatantcheva	6	6

Second round
WC	(Mexico) Marcela Zacarías	7^{7}	4	2
(Portugal) Maria João Koehler	6^{5}	6	6
(Netherlands) Kiki Bertens	3	6	6^{5}
5	(Kazakhstan) Sesil Karatantcheva	6	3	7^{7}

Qualifying competition
(Portugal) Maria João Koehler	6	4	2
5	(Kazakhstan) Sesil Karatantcheva	2	6	6
