= 2015 Abierto Mexicano Telcel – Men's doubles =

Men's doubles
- 2015 Abierto Mexicano Telcel

Final
- Champions: (Croatia) Ivan Dodig (Brazil) Marcelo Melo
- Runners-up: (Poland) Mariusz Fyrstenberg (Mexico) Santiago González
- Score: 7–6^{(7–2)}, 5–7, [10–3]

Events
Singles	men	women
Doubles	men	women
← 2014 ·	Abierto Mexicano Telcel	· 2016 →

Kevin Anderson and Matthew Ebden were the defending champions, but they chose not to participate this year.
Ivan Dodig and Marcelo Melo won the title, defeating Mariusz Fyrstenberg and Santiago González in the final, 7–6^{(7–2)}, 5–7, [10–3].

== Seeds ==
1. (Croatia) Ivan Dodig / (Brazil) Marcelo Melo (champions)
2. (Spain) Marcel Granollers / (Spain) Marc López (first round)
3. (Austria) Alexander Peya / (Brazil) Bruno Soares (first round)
4. (Colombia) Juan Sebastián Cabal / (Colombia) Robert Farah (semifinals)

== Draw ==
=== Key ===
- Q = Qualifier
- WC = Wild card
- LL = Lucky loser
- Alt = Alternate
- SE = Special exempt
- PR = Protected ranking
- ITF = ITF entry
- JE = Junior exempt
- w/o = Walkover
- r = Retired
- d = Defaulted
- SR = Special ranking

=== Draw ===
First round
1	(Croatia) I Dodig (Brazil) M Melo	6	6
(Philippines) T Huey (United States) S Lipsky	3	4
WC	(Mexico) C Ramírez (Mexico) MÁ Reyes-Varela	7	7^{7}
(New Zealand) A Sitak (Serbia) V Troicki	5	6^{5}
4	(Colombia) JS Cabal (Colombia) R Farah	6	7^{7}
(Colombia) S Giraldo (Chinese Taipei) Y-h Lu	2	6^{4}
(United States) E Butorac (United States) R Ram	2	6	[8]
Q	(Germany) D Brown (Germany) T Kamke	6	3	[10]
(Germany) A Begemann (Netherlands) R Haase	6	7^{7}
(Germany) B Becker (Austria) P Oswald	4	6^{3}
(Dominican Republic) V Estrella Burgos (Belarus) M Mirnyi	6	6
3	(Austria) A Peya (Brazil) B Soares	3	1
(Australia) S Groth (Australia) C Guccione	3	6	[5]
WC	(Mexico) T Hank (Mexico) M Sánchez	6	3	[10]
(Poland) M Fyrstenberg (Mexico) S González	7	6
2	(Spain) M Granollers (Spain) M López	5	4

Quarterfinals
1	(Croatia) I Dodig (Brazil) M Melo	6	6
WC	(Mexico) C Ramírez (Mexico) MÁ Reyes-Varela	1	3
4	(Colombia) JS Cabal (Colombia) R Farah	6	6^{5}	[19]
Q	(Germany) D Brown (Germany) T Kamke	3	7^{7}	[17]
(Germany) A Begemann (Netherlands) R Haase	7^{8}	4	[3]
(Dominican Republic) V Estrella Burgos (Belarus) M Mirnyi	6^{6}	6	[10]
WC	(Mexico) T Hank (Mexico) M Sánchez	0	1
(Poland) M Fyrstenberg (Mexico) S González	6	6

Semifinals
1	(Croatia) I Dodig (Brazil) M Melo	4	7^{8}	[10]
4	(Colombia) JS Cabal (Colombia) R Farah	6	6^{6}	[4]
(Dominican Republic) V Estrella Burgos (Belarus) M Mirnyi	3	6^{3}
(Poland) M Fyrstenberg (Mexico) S González	6	7^{7}

Final
1	(Croatia) I Dodig (Brazil) M Melo	7^{7}	5	[10]
(Poland) M Fyrstenberg (Mexico) S González	6^{2}	7	[3]

== Qualifying ==
=== Seeds ===
1. (United States) Austin Krajicek / (Australia) John-Patrick Smith (first round)
2. (Colombia) Nicolás Barrientos / (Colombia) Alejandro González (first round)

=== Qualifiers ===
1. (Germany) Dustin Brown / (Germany) Tobias Kamke

=== Qualifying draw ===
First round
1	(United States) Austin Krajicek (Australia) John-Patrick Smith	6^{6}	6	[6]
(Germany) Dustin Brown (Germany) Tobias Kamke	7^{8}	1	[10]
WC	(Colombia) Alejandro Falla (Mexico) Daniel Garza	6	6
2	(Colombia) Nicolás Barrientos (Colombia) Alejandro González	2	4

Qualifying competition
(Germany) Dustin Brown (Germany) Tobias Kamke	3	6	[10]
WC	(Colombia) Alejandro Falla (Mexico) Daniel Garza	6	3	[5]
