= 2013 Abierto Mexicano Telcel – Men's singles =

Men's singles
- 2013 Abierto Mexicano Telcel

Final
- Champion: (Spain) Rafael Nadal
- Runner-up: (Spain) David Ferrer
- Score: 6–0, 6–2

Events
Singles	men	women
Doubles	men	women
- Abierto Mexicano Telcel

Rafael Nadal defeated the three-time defending champion David Ferrer in the final, 6–0, 6–2 to win the men's singles tennis title at the 2013 Mexican Open.

== Seeds ==
1. (Spain) David Ferrer (final)
2. (Spain) Rafael Nadal (champion)
3. (Spain) Nicolás Almagro (semifinals)
4. (Switzerland) Stanislas Wawrinka (first round)
5. (Austria) Jürgen Melzer (first round)
6. (Brazil) Thomaz Bellucci (first round)
7. (France) Benoît Paire (first round)
8. (Argentina) Horacio Zeballos (quarterfinals)

== Draw ==
Key

- Q = Qualifier
- WC = Wild card
- LL = Lucky loser
- Alt = Alternate
- ITF = ITF entry
- PR = Protected ranking
- SR = Special ranking
- SE = Special exempt
- JE = Junior exempt
- JR = Junior Accelerator Programme entrant
- CO = College Accelerator Programme entrant
- NG = Next Gen Accelerator Program entrant
- w/o = Walkover
- r = Retired
- d = Defaulted

=== Finals ===
Semifinals
1	(Spain) David Ferrer	6	6^{5}	6
(Italy) Fabio Fognini	3	7^{7}	1
3	(Spain) Nicolás Almagro	5	4
2	(Spain) Rafael Nadal	7	6

Final
1	(Spain) David Ferrer	0	2
2	(Spain) Rafael Nadal	6	6

=== Top half ===
First round
1	(Spain) D Ferrer	6	6
LL	(Croatia) A Veić	0	3
Q	(United States) W Odesnik	6	6
(Poland) Ł Kubot	3	4
Q	(Serbia) D Lajović	6	5	2
(Spain) P Andújar	3	7	6
(Italy) P Lorenzi	4	6	6
7	(France) B Paire	6	3	4
4	(Switzerland) S Wawrinka	2	6^{3}
(Italy) F Fognini	6	7^{7}
(Slovenia) A Bedene	4	6	6
(Argentina) D Nalbandian	6	0	4
(Colombia) S Giraldo	4	6	6
(Spain) R Ramírez Hidalgo	6	4	4
(Portugal) J Sousa	6	6
5	(Austria) J Melzer	4	3

Second round
1	(Spain) D Ferrer	6	6
Q	(United States) W Odesnik	2	1
(Spain) P Andújar	4	3
(Italy) P Lorenzi	6	6
(Italy) F Fognini	2	6	7^{7}
(Slovenia) A Bedene	6	4	6^{4}
(Colombia) S Giraldo	7^{10}	7
(Portugal) J Sousa	6^{8}	5

Quarterfinals
1	(Spain) D Ferrer	6	6
(Italy) P Lorenzi	3	1
(Italy) F Fognini	7	6
(Colombia) S Giraldo	5	4

Semifinals
1	(Spain) D Ferrer	6	6^{5}	6
(Italy) F Fognini	3	7^{7}	1

=== Bottom half ===
First round
8	(Argentina) H Zeballos	7	6
(Italy) S Bolelli	5	1
(Spain) D Gimeno-Traver	6	6
(Argentina) C Berlocq	3	2
PR	(Spain) T Robredo	6	2	6
(Italy) F Volandri	2	6	4
WC	(Mexico) C Ramírez	0	1
3	(Spain) N Almagro	6	6
6	(Brazil) T Bellucci	6	4	4
(Russia) A Kuznetsov	4	6	6
(Argentina) L Mayer	6	7^{8}
WC	(Mexico) MÁ Reyes-Varela	0	6^{6}
Q	(Argentina) M Alund	7^{9}	7
WC	(Mexico) D Garza	6^{7}	5
Q	(Argentina) D Schwartzman	2	2
2	(Spain) R Nadal	6	6

Second round
8	(Argentina) H Zeballos	6	6
(Spain) D Gimeno-Traver	2	3
PR	(Spain) T Robredo	4	6^{4}
3	(Spain) N Almagro	6	7^{7}
(Russia) A Kuznetsov	2	2
(Argentina) L Mayer	6	6
Q	(Argentina) M Alund	0	4
2	(Spain) R Nadal	6	6

Quarterfinals
8	(Argentina) H Zeballos	3	4
3	(Spain) N Almagro	6	6
(Argentina) L Mayer	1	5
2	(Spain) R Nadal	6	7

Semifinals
3	(Spain) N Almagro	5	4
2	(Spain) R Nadal	7	6

== Qualifying ==
=== Seeds ===
1. (Argentina) Martín Alund (qualified)
2. (Germany) Philipp Petzschner (qualifying competition, retired)
3. (Croatia) Antonio Veić (Qualifying competition, lucky loser)
4. (United States) Wayne Odesnik (qualified)
5. (Serbia) Dušan Lajović (qualified)
6. (Argentina) Diego Schwartzman (qualified)
7. (Italy) Potito Starace (first round)
8. (Spain) Javier Martí (qualifying competition)

=== Qualifiers ===
1. (Argentina) Martín Alund
2. (Serbia) Dušan Lajović
3. (Argentina) Diego Schwartzman
4. (United States) Wayne Odesnik

=== Lucky loser ===
1. (Croatia) Antonio Veić

=== Draw ===
==== First qualifier ====
First round
1	(Argentina) Martín Alund	6	6
WC	(Mexico) Eduardo Peralta-Tello	1	0
(Russia) Teymuraz Gabashvili	6	6
7	(Italy) Potito Starace	3	4

Qualifying competition
1	(Argentina) Martín Alund	3	7^{7}	6
(Russia) Teymuraz Gabashvili	6	6^{2}	2

==== Second qualifier ====
First round
2	(Germany) Philipp Petzschner	7^{7}	6
(Colombia) Nicolás Barrientos	6^{3}	3
(Mexico) Mauricio Astorga	2	4
5	(Serbia) Dušan Lajović	6	6

Qualifying competition
2	(Germany) Philipp Petzschner	4	0^{r}
5	(Serbia) Dušan Lajović	6	0

==== Third qualifier ====
First round
3	(Croatia) Antonio Veić	6	6
WC	(Mexico) Luis Patiño	2	0
(Mexico) Luis Díaz-Barriga	1	0
6	(Argentina) Diego Schwartzman	6	6

Qualifying competition
3	(Croatia) Antonio Veić	5	2
6	(Argentina) Diego Schwartzman	7	6

==== Fourth qualifier ====
First round
4	(United States) Wayne Odesnik	6	6
(Australia) Matheson Klein	3	1
(Colombia) Juan Sebastián Cabal	3	6	3
8	(Spain) Javier Martí	6	3	6

Qualifying competition
4	(United States) Wayne Odesnik	2	7	7^{7}
8	(Spain) Javier Martí	6	5	6^{5}
