= 2013 Abierto Mexicano Telcel – Men's doubles =

Men's doubles
- 2013 Abierto Mexicano Telcel

Final
- Champions: (Poland) Łukasz Kubot (Spain) David Marrero
- Runners-up: (Italy) Simone Bolelli (Italy) Fabio Fognini
- Score: 7–5, 6–2

Events
| Singles | men | women |
| Doubles | men | women |
| ← 2012 · | Abierto Mexicano Telcel | · 2014 → |

David Marrero and Fernando Verdasco were the defending champions but Verdasco decided not to participate.
Marrero successfully defended the title alongside Łukasz Kubot, defeating Simone Bolelli and Fabio Fognini in the final, 7–5, 6–2.

== Seeds ==
1. (Austria) Alexander Peya / (Brazil) Bruno Soares (semifinals)
2. (Poland) Łukasz Kubot / (Spain) David Marrero (champions)
3. (Mexico) Santiago González / (United States) Scott Lipsky (first round)
4. (Austria) Jürgen Melzer / (Germany) Philipp Petzschner (quarterfinals)

== Draw ==
=== Key ===
- Q = Qualifier
- WC = Wild card
- LL = Lucky loser
- Alt = Alternate
- SE = Special exempt
- PR = Protected ranking
- ITF = ITF entry
- JE = Junior exempt
- w/o = Walkover
- r = Retired
- d = Defaulted
- SR = Special ranking

=== Draw ===
First round
1 | (Austria) A Peya (Brazil) B Soares | 6 | 4 | [10]
(Philippines) TC Huey (United Kingdom) D Inglot | 3 | 6 | [7]
(Austria) O Marach (Argentina) H Zeballos | 5 | 6 | [4]
(Czech Republic) F Čermák (Slovakia) M Mertiňák | 7 | 0 | [10]
3 | (Mexico) S González (United States) S Lipsky | 5 | 2
(Italy) S Bolelli (Italy) F Fognini | 7 | 6
(Colombia) JS Cabal (Colombia) R Farah | 6 | 6
(France) B Paire (Switzerland) S Wawrinka | 2 | 3
(Brazil) T Bellucci (Italy) P Lorenzi | 6 | 6
WC | (Mexico) M Gallardo Valles (Mexico) C Ramírez | 4 | 1
WC | (Mexico) D Garza (Mexico) MÁ Reyes-Varela | 2 | 2
4 | (Austria) J Melzer (Germany) P Petzschner | 6 | 6
PR | (Spain) P Andújar (Spain) T Robredo | 6^{7} | 3
(Italy) D Bracciali (Czech Republic) L Dlouhý | 7^{9} | 6
Alt | (Italy) P Starace (Italy) F Volandri | 5 | 1
2 | (Poland) Ł Kubot (Spain) D Marrero | 7 | 6

Quarterfinals
1 | (Austria) A Peya (Brazil) B Soares | 6 | 6
(Czech Republic) F Čermák (Slovakia) M Mertiňák | 4 | 1
(Italy) S Bolelli (Italy) F Fognini | 6 | 6
(Colombia) JS Cabal (Colombia) R Farah | 2 | 4
(Brazil) T Bellucci (Italy) P Lorenzi | 6 | 4 | [10]
4 | (Austria) J Melzer (Germany) P Petzschner | 4 | 6 | [8]
(Italy) D Bracciali (Czech Republic) L Dlouhý | 2 | 6^{1}
2 | (Poland) Ł Kubot (Spain) D Marrero | 6 | 7^{7}

Semifinals
1 | (Austria) A Peya (Brazil) B Soares | 6 | 6^{4} | [3]
(Italy) S Bolelli (Italy) F Fognini | 2 | 7^{7} | [10]
(Brazil) T Bellucci (Italy) P Lorenzi | 1 | 2
2 | (Poland) Ł Kubot (Spain) D Marrero | 6 | 6

Final
(Italy) S Bolelli (Italy) F Fognini | 5 | 2
2 | (Poland) Ł Kubot (Spain) D Marrero | 7 | 6
