= 2013 Abierto Mexicano Telcel – Women's singles =

Tennis tournament

Women's singles
- 2013 Abierto Mexicano Telcel

Final
- Champion: (Italy) Sara Errani
- Runner-up: (Spain) Carla Suárez Navarro
- Score: 6–0, 6–4

Details
- Draw: 32
- Seeds: 8

Events
Singles	men	women
Doubles	men	women
- Abierto Mexicano Telcel

Sara Errani was the defending champion and she retained her title, beating Carla Suárez Navarro in the final, 6–0, 6–4.

== Seeds ==
1. (Italy) Sara Errani (champion)
2. (Spain) Carla Suárez Navarro (final)
3. (France) Alizé Cornet (semifinals)
4. (Romania) Irina-Camelia Begu (second round, retired)
5. (Netherlands) Kiki Bertens (quarterfinals)
6. (Italy) Francesca Schiavone (quarterfinals)
7. (Spain) Lourdes Domínguez Lino (quarterfinals)
8. (Switzerland) Romina Oprandi (second round)

== Draw ==
Key

- Q = Qualifier
- WC = Wild card
- LL = Lucky loser
- Alt = Alternate
- ITF = ITF entry
- PR = Protected ranking
- SR = Special ranking
- SE = Special exempt
- JE = Junior exempt
- JR = Junior Accelerator Programme entrant
- CO = College Accelerator Programme entrant
- NG = Next Gen Accelerator Program entrant
- w/o = Walkover
- r = Retired
- d = Defaulted

=== Finals ===
Semifinals
1	(Italy) Sara Errani	6	6
3	(France) Alizé Cornet	2	1
(Spain) Silvia Soler Espinosa	2	1
2	(Spain) Carla Suárez Navarro	6	6

Final
1	(Italy) Sara Errani	6	6
2	(Spain) Carla Suárez Navarro	0	4

=== Top half ===
First round
1	(Italy) S Errani	6	6
(Romania) A Cadanțu	3	2
(Czech Republic) E Birnerová	6^{5}	3
Q	(Canada) E Bouchard	7^{7}	6
Q	(Spain) MJ Martínez Sánchez	6	6
(Russia) A Panova	3	1
LL	(Canada) S Fichman	2	5
5	(Netherlands) K Bertens	6	7
3	(France) A Cornet	6	2	6
Q	(Colombia) C Castaño	1	6	3
(Spain) E Cabeza Candela	6	6
(Portugal) MJ Koehler	2	0
(Spain) MT Torró Flor	6	6
(France) P Parmentier	1	4
(Italy) F Pennetta	5	3
7	(Spain) L Domínguez Lino	7	6

Second round
1	(Italy) S Errani	7^{7}	6
Q	(Canada) E Bouchard	6^{4}	2
Q	(Spain) MJ Martínez Sánchez	1	2
5	(Netherlands) K Bertens	6	6
3	(France) A Cornet	6	6
(Spain) E Cabeza Candela	4	4
(Spain) MT Torró Flor	4	0^{r}
7	(Spain) L Domínguez Lino	6	3

Quarterfinals
1	(Italy) S Errani	6	6
5	(Netherlands) K Bertens	4	4
3	(France) A Cornet	3	7^{12}	7^{7}
7	(Spain) L Domínguez Lino	6	6^{10}	6^{2}

Semifinals
1	(Italy) S Errani	6	6
3	(France) A Cornet	2	1

=== Bottom half ===
First round
8	(Switzerland) R Oprandi	6	2	7
(United States) A Glatch	4	6	5
(Sweden) J Larsson	3	1
(Italy) K Knapp	6	6
(Luxembourg) M Minella	1	6^{3}
(Spain) S Soler Espinosa	6	7^{7}
WC	(Croatia) A Tomljanović	2	6	5
4	(Romania) I-C Begu	6	3	7
6/WC	(Italy) F Schiavone	6	4	6
Q	(United States) G Min	4	6	2
WC	(Mexico) X Hermoso	0	3
(Kazakhstan) S Karatantcheva	6	6
(United States) J Cohen	7	6^{5}	0
(France) S Foretz Gacon	5	7^{7}	6
(France) M Johansson	1	0
2	(Spain) C Suárez Navarro	6	6

Second round
8	(Switzerland) R Oprandi	4	6^{2}
(Italy) K Knapp	6	7^{7}
(Spain) S Soler Espinosa	6	2
4	(Romania) I-C Begu	2	1^{r}
6/WC	(Italy) F Schiavone	6	6
(Kazakhstan) S Karatantcheva	3	4
(France) S Foretz Gacon	1	2
2	(Spain) C Suárez Navarro	6	6

Quarterfinals
(Italy) K Knapp	2	2
(Spain) S Soler Espinosa	6	6
6/WC	(Italy) F Schiavone	7^{7}	4	2
2	(Spain) C Suárez Navarro	6^{5}	6	6

Semifinals
(Spain) S Soler Espinosa	2	1
2	(Spain) C Suárez Navarro	6	6

== Qualifying ==
=== Seeds ===
1. (Canada) Sharon Fichman (qualifying competition, lucky loser)
2. (Canada) Eugenie Bouchard (qualified)
3. (United States) Irina Falconi (first round)
4. (Austria) Yvonne Meusberger (qualifying competition)
5. (Colombia) Mariana Duque Mariño (qualifying competition)
6. (Canada) Stéphanie Dubois (second round)
7. (Italy) Nastassja Burnett (second round)
8. (United Kingdom) Johanna Konta (second round)

=== Qualifiers ===
1. (Colombia) Catalina Castaño
2. (Canada) Eugenie Bouchard
3. (Spain) María José Martínez Sánchez
4. (United States) Grace Min

=== Lucky loser ===
1. (Canada) Sharon Fichman

=== Draw ===
==== First qualifier ====
First round
1	(Canada) Sharon Fichman	7^{7}	0
(Ukraine) Olga Savchuk	6^{2}	0^{r}
(Latvia) Anastasija Sevastova	5	6	1
(Spain) Arantxa Parra Santonja	7	3	6
(Colombia) Catalina Castaño	6	6
(France) Laura Thorpe	0	1
(Switzerland) Amra Sadiković	2	0
8	(United Kingdom) Johanna Konta	6	6

Second round
1	(Canada) Sharon Fichman	7	7
(Spain) Arantxa Parra Santonja	5	5
(Colombia) Catalina Castaño	4	6	6
8	(United Kingdom) Johanna Konta	6	1	2

Qualifying competition
1	(Canada) Sharon Fichman	1	2
(Colombia) Catalina Castaño	6	6

==== Second qualifier ====
First round
2	(Canada) Eugenie Bouchard	6	6^{4}	7
WC	(Mexico) Ana Sofía Sánchez	2	7^{7}	5
(Poland) Katarzyna Piter	6	6
(Spain) Inés Ferrer Suárez	2	0
(Czech Republic) Renata Voráčová	7^{7}	4	1^{r}
WC	(Mexico) Marcela Zacarías	6^{5}	6	4
(Romania) Elena Bogdan	2	2
5	(Colombia) Mariana Duque Mariño	6	6

Second round
2	(Canada) Eugenie Bouchard	6	6
(Poland) Katarzyna Piter	3	3
WC	(Mexico) Marcela Zacarías	2	0
5	(Colombia) Mariana Duque Mariño	6	6

Qualifying competition
2	(Canada) Eugenie Bouchard	6	6
5	(Colombia) Mariana Duque Mariño	3	3

==== Third qualifier ====
First round
3	(United States) Irina Falconi	3	6	5
(Ukraine) Kateryna Kozlova	6	3	7
(Serbia) Aleksandra Krunić	4	2
(Spain) Laura Pous Tió	6	6
(Spain) María José Martínez Sánchez	6	6
(Italy) Corinna Dentoni	4	4
(Poland) Magda Linette	2	7	2
7	(Italy) Nastassja Burnett	6	5	6

Second round
(Ukraine) Kateryna Kozlova	6^{2}	6	2
(Spain) Laura Pous Tió	7^{7}	1	6
(Spain) María José Martínez Sánchez	7	2	6
7	(Italy) Nastassja Burnett	5	6	2

Qualifying competition
(Spain) Laura Pous Tió	2	1
(Spain) María José Martínez Sánchez	6	6

==== Fourth qualifier ====
First round
4	(Austria) Yvonne Meusberger	6	6
WC	(Mexico) Victoria Rodríguez	1	2
(United States) Jill Craybas	3	6^{1}
(Netherlands) Richèl Hogenkamp	6	7^{7}
(United States) Grace Min	6	7
(United States) Shelby Rogers	1	5
(Belarus) Polina Pekhova	0	6	5
6	(Canada) Stéphanie Dubois	6	4	7

Second round
4	(Austria) Yvonne Meusberger	6	4	6
(Netherlands) Richèl Hogenkamp	2	6	2
(United States) Grace Min	7	6
6	(Canada) Stéphanie Dubois	5	1

Qualifying competition
4	(Austria) Yvonne Meusberger	4	6	3
(United States) Grace Min	6	3	6
