= 2015 Abierto Mexicano Telcel – Women's doubles =

Women's doubles
- 2015 Abierto Mexicano Telcel

Final
- Champions: (Spain) Lara Arruabarrena (Spain) María Teresa Torró Flor
- Runners-up: (Czech Republic) Andrea Hlaváčková (Czech Republic) Lucie Hradecká
- Score: 7–6^{(7–2)}, 5–7, [13–11]

Events
| Singles | men | women |
| Doubles | men | women |
| ← 2014 · | Abierto Mexicano Telcel | · 2016 → |

Kristina Mladenovic and Galina Voskoboeva were the defending champions, but they chose not to participate this year.
Lara Arruabarrena and María Teresa Torró Flor won the title, defeating Andrea Hlaváčková and Lucie Hradecká in the final, 7–6^{(7–2)}, 5–7, [13–11].

== Seeds ==
1. (Czech Republic) Andrea Hlaváčková / (Czech Republic) Lucie Hradecká (final)
2. (Spain) Lara Arruabarrena / (Spain) María Teresa Torró Flor (champions)
3. (Netherlands) Kiki Bertens / (Sweden) Johanna Larsson (semifinals)
4. (Chinese Taipei) Chan Chin-wei / (France) Laura Thorpe (first round)

== Draw ==
=== Key ===
- Q = Qualifier
- WC = Wild card
- LL = Lucky loser
- Alt = Alternate
- SE = Special exempt
- PR = Protected ranking
- ITF = ITF entry
- JE = Junior exempt
- w/o = Walkover
- r = Retired
- d = Defaulted
- SR = Special ranking

=== Draw ===
First round
1 | (Czech Republic) A Hlaváčková (Czech Republic) L Hradecká | 6 | 6
(Switzerland) T Bacsinszky (Chinese Taipei) C-j Chuang | 2 | 2
(Colombia) M Duque Mariño (Argentina) M Irigoyen | 2 | 5
(Japan) E Hozumi (Japan) M Ninomiya | 6 | 7
4 | (Chinese Taipei) C-w Chan (France) L Thorpe | 1 | 5
(United States) L Davis (Puerto Rico) M Puig | 6 | 7
(Mexico) V Rodríguez (Mexico) M Zacarías | 2 | 2
(Romania) E Bogdan (United States) N Melichar | 6 | 6
(United Kingdom) J Rae (United Kingdom) A Smith | 6 | 6
WC | (Mexico) C Betancourt (Mexico) A Guzmán | 0 | 3
(Ukraine) K Bondarenko (Romania) R Olaru | 2 | 6 | [6]
3 | (Netherlands) K Bertens (Sweden) J Larsson | 6 | 4 | [10]
(United States) L Chirico (Mexico) AS Sánchez | 5 | 1
(United States) I Falconi (Czech Republic) E Hrdinová | 7 | 6
(United States) M Brengle (Russia) M Shamayko | 1 | 3
2 | (Spain) L Arruabarrena (Spain) MT Torró Flor | 6 | 6

Quarterfinals
1 | (Czech Republic) A Hlaváčková (Czech Republic) L Hradecká | 7 | 6
(Japan) E Hozumi (Japan) M Ninomiya | 5 | 4
(United States) L Davis (Puerto Rico) M Puig | 1^{r}
(Romania) E Bogdan (United States) N Melichar | 2
(United Kingdom) J Rae (United Kingdom) A Smith | 4 | 4
3 | (Netherlands) K Bertens (Sweden) J Larsson | 6 | 6
(United States) I Falconi (Czech Republic) E Hrdinová | 4 | 3
2 | (Spain) L Arruabarrena (Spain) MT Torró Flor | 6 | 6

Semifinals
1 | (Czech Republic) A Hlaváčková (Czech Republic) L Hradecká | 6 | 1 | [11]
(Romania) E Bogdan (United States) N Melichar | 4 | 6 | [9]
3 | (Netherlands) K Bertens (Sweden) J Larsson | 6 | 2 | [4]
2 | (Spain) L Arruabarrena (Spain) MT Torró Flor | 2 | 6 | [10]

Final
1 | (Czech Republic) A Hlaváčková (Czech Republic) L Hradecká | 6^{2} | 7 | [11]
2 | (Spain) L Arruabarrena (Spain) MT Torró Flor | 7^{7} | 5 | [13]
