= 2015 Abierto Mexicano Telcel – Men's singles =

Men's singles
- 2015 Abierto Mexicano Telcel

Final
- Champion: (Spain) David Ferrer
- Runner-up: (Japan) Kei Nishikori
- Score: 6–3, 7–5

Events
Singles	men	women
Doubles	men	women
- Abierto Mexicano Telcel

Grigor Dimitrov was the defending champion, but lost to Ryan Harrison in the second round.

David Ferrer won the title, defeating Kei Nishikori in the final, 6–3, 7–5.

== Seeds ==
1. (Japan) Kei Nishikori (final)
2. (Spain) David Ferrer (champion)
3. (Bulgaria) Grigor Dimitrov (second round)
4. (South Africa) Kevin Anderson (semifinals)

5. (Ukraine) Alexandr Dolgopolov (quarterfinals)
6. (Croatia) Ivo Karlović (quarterfinals)
7. (Colombia) Santiago Giraldo (second round)
8. (Germany) Benjamin Becker (second round)

== Draw ==
Key

- Q = Qualifier
- WC = Wild card
- LL = Lucky loser
- Alt = Alternate
- ITF = ITF entry
- PR = Protected ranking
- SR = Special ranking
- SE = Special exempt
- JE = Junior exempt
- JR = Junior Accelerator Programme entrant
- CO = College Accelerator Programme entrant
- NG = Next Gen Accelerator Program entrant
- w/o = Walkover
- r = Retired
- d = Defaulted

=== Finals ===
Semifinals
1	(Japan) Kei Nishikori	6	3	6
4/WC	(South Africa) Kevin Anderson	2	6	3
Q	(United States) Ryan Harrison	6	0	0
2	(Spain) David Ferrer	4	6	6

Final
1	(Japan) Kei Nishikori	3	5
2	(Spain) David Ferrer	6	7

=== Top half ===
First round
1	(Japan) K Nishikori	6	7
Q	(Colombia) A González	3	5
(Dominican Republic) V Estrella Burgos	2	5
(Chinese Taipei) Y-h Lu	6	7
(Netherlands) R Haase	3	6	2
(Austria) A Haider-Maurer	6	2	6
(Australia) S Groth	3	6	0
5	(Ukraine) A Dolgopolov	6	4	6
4/WC	(South Africa) K Anderson	6	6
(Germany) D Brown	1	2
(Croatia) I Dodig	4	4
(United States) S Johnson	6	6
WC	(Mexico) D Garza	4	3
(Serbia) V Troicki	6	6
Q	(United States) A Krajicek	6^{8}	1
7/WC	(Colombia) S Giraldo	7^{10}	6

Second round
1	(Japan) K Nishikori	6	6
(Chinese Taipei) Y-h Lu	1	3
(Austria) A Haider-Maurer	2	3
5	(Ukraine) A Dolgopolov	6	6
4/WC	(South Africa) K Anderson	3	7	6
(United States) S Johnson	6	5	3
(Serbia) V Troicki	6	6
7/WC	(Colombia) S Giraldo	3	4

Quarterfinals
1	(Japan) K Nishikori	6	6
5	(Ukraine) A Dolgopolov	4	4
4/WC	(South Africa) K Anderson	3	6	6
(Serbia) V Troicki	6	3	3

Semifinals
1	(Japan) K Nishikori	6	3	6
4/WC	(South Africa) K Anderson	2	6	3

=== Bottom half ===
First round
6	(Croatia) I Karlović	6	3	6
(Russia) T Gabashvili	4	6	2
(Serbia) D Lajović	6	7^{7}
Q	(Australia) T Kokkinakis	4	6^{4}
(United States) D Young	6	2	2^{r}
Q	(United States) R Harrison	4	6	4
(Serbia) F Krajinović	3	7	0
3	(Bulgaria) G Dimitrov	6	5	6
8	(Germany) B Becker	7^{7}	6
(Germany) T Kamke	6^{4}	2
(Australia) B Tomic	3	6	6
(France) A Mannarino	6	4	4
(Australia) M Matosevic	6	6
(Spain) M Granollers	4	2
(Netherlands) I Sijsling	3	6^{4}
2	(Spain) D Ferrer	6	7^{7}

Second round
6	(Croatia) I Karlović	3	6	6
(Serbia) D Lajović	6	3	1
Q	(United States) R Harrison	7	4	6
3	(Bulgaria) G Dimitrov	5	6	0
8	(Germany) B Becker	6	3	2
(Australia) B Tomic	4	6	6
(Australia) M Matosevic	6^{3}	4
2	(Spain) D Ferrer	7^{7}	6

Quarterfinals
6	(Croatia) I Karlović	6	6^{0}	6^{4}
Q	(United States) R Harrison	4	7^{7}	7^{7}
(Australia) B Tomic	4	6	1
2	(Spain) D Ferrer	6	3	6

Semifinals
Q	(United States) R Harrison	6	0	0
2	(Spain) D Ferrer	4	6	6

== Qualifying ==
=== Seeds ===
1. (United States) Tim Smyczek (first round)
2. (Slovakia) Lukáš Lacko (first round)
3. (Colombia) Alejandro González (qualified)
4. (Slovenia) Aljaž Bedene (qualifying competition)
5. (Colombia) Alejandro Falla (qualifying competition)
6. (Portugal) Gastão Elias (first round)
7. (Chinese Taipei) Jimmy Wang (qualifying competition)
8. (Spain) Adrián Menéndez-Maceiras (first round)

=== Qualifiers ===
1. (United States) Ryan Harrison
2. (Australia) Thanasi Kokkinakis
3. (Colombia) Alejandro González
4. (United States) Austin Krajicek

=== Qualifying draw ===
==== First qualifier ====
First round
1	(United States) Tim Smyczek	5	7^{11}	4
(United States) Michael Russell	7	6^{9}	6
Alt	(United States) Ryan Harrison	6	6
8	(Spain) Adrián Menéndez-Maceiras	1	2

Qualifying competition
(United States) Michael Russell	2	3
Alt	(United States) Ryan Harrison	6	6

==== Second qualifier ====
First round
2	(Slovakia) Lukáš Lacko	3	2
(Australia) Thanasi Kokkinakis	6	6
Alt	(United States) Chase Buchanan	4	4
5	(Colombia) Alejandro Falla	6	6

Qualifying competition
(Australia) Thanasi Kokkinakis	4	6	7^{7}
5	(Colombia) Alejandro Falla	6	3	6^{3}

==== Third qualifier ====
First round
3	(Colombia) Alejandro González	6	6
WC	(Mexico) Aitor Aramburu	0	2
WC	(Mexico) Miguel Ángel Reyes-Varela	7^{7}	1	0^{r}
7	(Chinese Taipei) Jimmy Wang	6^{5}	6	1

Qualifying competition
3	(Colombia) Alejandro González	6	7^{7}
7	(Chinese Taipei) Jimmy Wang	4	6^{3}

==== Fourth qualifier ====
First round
4	(Slovenia) Aljaž Bedene	6	6
WC	(Mexico) Tigre Hank	1	2
(United States) Austin Krajicek	6	3	6
6	(Portugal) Gastão Elias	4	6	4

Qualifying competition
4	(Slovenia) Aljaž Bedene	5	6^{4}
(United States) Austin Krajicek	7	7^{7}
