= Adriana Guzmán =

Mexican tennis player (born 1992)

- Full name: Adriana Guzmán
- Country (sports): Mexico
- Born: 30 June 1992 (age 32); Mexico
- Prize money: $3,473

Singles
- Career record: 9–13
- Career titles: 0
- Highest ranking: 1031 (18 May 2015)

Doubles
- Career record: 7–12
- Career titles: 0
- Highest ranking: 1214 (27 July 2015)

Adriana Guzmán (born 30 June 1992) is a Mexican tennis player.

On 18 May 2015, Guzmán reached her best singles ranking of world number 1031. On 27 July 2015, she peaked at world number 1214 in the doubles rankings.

Guzmán made her WTA tour debut at the 2015 Abierto Mexicano Telcel, partnering Carolina Betancourt in doubles.
