= 2012 Abierto Mexicano Telcel =

- Date: 27 February – 3 March
- Edition: 19th (men) / 12th (women)
- Surface: Clay / outdoor
- Location: Acapulco, Mexico

Champions

Men's singles
- (Spain) David Ferrer

Women's singles
- (Italy) Sara Errani

Men's doubles
- (Spain) David Marrero / (Spain) Fernando Verdasco

Women's doubles
- (Italy) Sara Errani / (Italy) Roberta Vinci
- Mexican Open

The 2012 Abierto Mexicano Telcel was a professional tennis tournament played on outdoor clay courts. It was the 19th edition of the men's tournament (12th for the women), which was part of the 2012 ATP World Tour and the 2012 WTA Tour. It took place in Acapulco, Mexico between 27 February and 3 March 2012. David Ferrer and Sara Errani won the singles titles.

== ATP singles main draw entrants ==
=== Seeds ===
Country	Player	Ranking^{1}	Seeds
ESP	David Ferrer	5	1
ESP	Nicolás Almagro	11	2
FRA	Gilles Simon	12	3
JPN	Kei Nishikori	17	4
GER	Florian Mayer	19	5
ARG	Juan Mónaco	20	6
ESP	Marcel Granollers	23	7
ESP	Fernando Verdasco	25	8

- ^{1} Rankings are as of February 20, 2012

=== Other entrants ===
The following players received wildcards into the singles main draw:

- (Mexico) Daniel Garza
- (Mexico) Santiago González
- (Argentina) David Nalbandian
- (Mexico) Cesar Ramirez

The following players received entry from the qualifying draw:

- (Argentina) Facundo Bagnis
- (Colombia) Juan Sebastián Cabal
- (Italy) Alessandro Giannessi
- (Spain) Pere Riba

== ATP doubles main draw entrants ==
=== Seeds ===
Country	Player	Country	Player	Rank^{1}	Seed
CZE	František Čermák	SVK	Filip Polášek	41	1
MEX	Santiago González	GER	Christopher Kas	42	2
USA	Eric Butorac	BRA	Bruno Soares	47	3
ITA	Daniele Bracciali	COL	Juan Sebastián Cabal	54	4

- ^{1} Rankings are as of February 20, 2012

=== Other entrants ===
The following pairs received wildcards into the doubles main draw:

- (Mexico) Luis Díaz-Barriga / (Mexico) César Ramírez
- (Mexico) Daniel Garza / (Colombia) Santiago Giraldo

The following pairs entry as alternates:

- (Portugal) Rui Machado / (Spain) Pere Riba
- (Brazil) João Souza / (Italy) Filippo Volandri

=== Withdrawals ===
- (Spain) Nicolás Almagro
- (Argentina) Juan Mónaco (dehydration)

=== Retirements ===
- (Spain) David Ferrer (calf spasm)

== WTA singles main draw entrants ==
=== Seeds ===
Country	Player	Rank^{1}	Seeds
ITA	Roberta Vinci	23	1
ITA	Flavia Pennetta	28	2
ITA	Sara Errani	36	3
ROU	Irina-Camelia Begu	51	4
ROU	Alexandra Dulgheru	56	5
SWE	Johanna Larsson	61	6
ARG	Gisela Dulko	64	7
ITA	Alberta Brianti	67	8

- ^{1} Rankings are as of February 20, 2012

=== Other entrants ===
The following players received wildcards into the main draw:

- (Mexico) Nadia Abdalá
- (Mexico) Ximena Hermoso
- (Spain) Silvia Soler-Espinosa

The following players received entry from the qualifying draw:

- (Colombia) Mariana Duque-Mariño
- (Romania) Edina Gallovits-Hall
- (Kazakhstan) Sesil Karatantcheva
- (Slovenia) Petra Rampre

The following players received entry as lucky loser:

- (Spain) Estrella Cabeza Candela

=== Withdrawals ===
- (Argentina) Gisela Dulko (gastro intestinal illness)

== WTA doubles main draw entrants ==
=== Seeds ===
Country	Player	Country	Player	Rank^{1}	Seed
ITA	Sara Errani	ITA	Roberta Vinci	31	1
ESP	Lourdes Domínguez Lino	ESP	Arantxa Parra Santonja	114	2
ROU	Irina-Camelia Begu	FRA	Alizé Cornet	144	3
CRO	Darija Jurak	UKR	Mariya Koryttseva	150	4

- ^{1} Rankings are as of February 20, 2012

=== Other entrants ===
The following pairs received wildcards into the doubles main draw:

- (Mexico) Ana Paula de la Peña / (Mexico) Ivette López
- (Argentina) Gisela Dulko / (Argentina) Paola Suárez

The following pair received entry as alternates:

- (Canada) Sharon Fichman / (China) Sun Shengnan

=== Withdrawals ===
- (Kazakhstan) Yaroslava Shvedova (left thigh injury)

== Finals ==
=== Men's singles ===
(Spain) David Ferrer defeated (Spain) Fernando Verdasco, 6–1, 6–2

- It was Ferrer's 3rd title of the year and 14th of his career. It was his 3rd consecutive title at Acapulco.

=== Women's singles ===
(Italy) Sara Errani defeated (Italy) Flavia Pennetta, 5–7, 7–6^{(7–2)}, 6–0

- It was Errani's 1st title of the year and 3rd of her career.

=== Men's doubles ===
(Spain) David Marrero / (Spain) Fernando Verdasco defeated (Spain) Marcel Granollers / (Spain) Marc López 6–3, 6-4

=== Women's doubles ===
(Italy) Sara Errani / (Italy) Roberta Vinci defeated (Spain) Lourdes Domínguez Lino / (Spain) Arantxa Parra Santonja 6–2, 6-1
