= Fernando Meligeni career statistics =

Career finals
Discipline	Type	Won	Lost	Total	WR^{1}
Singles	ATP Tour^{2}	3	3	6	0.50
Singles	ATP Challenger Series^{3}	7	6	13	0.54
Singles	Satellite Tournaments^{4}	2	2	4	0.50
Singles	Olympic Games	0	0	0	0.00
Singles	Total	12	11	23	0.52
Doubles	ATP Tour^{2}	7	0	7	1.00
Doubles	ATP Challenger Series^{3}	3	7	10	0.33
Doubles	Satellite Tournaments^{4}	0	0	0	0.00
Doubles	Olympic Games	0	0	0	0.00
Doubles	Total	10	7	17	0.69
Total		22	18	40	0.55
^{1)}WR = Winning rate^{2)} Known as ATP World Tour since 2009.^{3)} Known as ATP Challenger Tour since 2009.^{4)} Predecessor of the ITF Men's Circuit.

This is a list of the main career statistics of Brazilian tennis player, Fernando Meligeni.

== Records and career milestones ==
Fernando 'Fino' Meligeni is one of the most successful Brazilian tennis players. He reached a career high of World no. 25 in October 1999 at singles and a career high World no. 34 in November 1997 at doubles. He won 10 ATP Tour titles, three in singles and seven in doubles. At the Summer Olympics in 1996, he reached the semi-finals, losing in the Bronze-medal match to Leander Paes, in what remains as the most successful run of Brazil in male tennis at the Olympic Games.

He won the gold medal at the 2003 Pan American Games, beating Marcelo Ríos in his final career match.

"Always said that, in the day of that I couldn't give 110% of me, I would retire. That day finally came. Now I want to be a normal guy."

— Meligeni about ending his career.

Other career highlights include finishing inside the ATP rankings top-100 year-end for ten consecutive years, from 1993 to 2002 and 10 ATP Challenger titles (seven in singles and three in doubles).

== Career finals ==
=== Olympic Games ===
==== Singles: 1 (4th place) ====
Result	Year	Tournament	Surface	Opponent	Score
4th place	1996	Atlanta Olympics	Hard	(India) Leander Paes	6–3, 2–6, 4–6

=== Pan American Games ===
==== Singles: 1 (1 gold medal) ====
Result	Year	Tournament	Surface	Opponent	Score
Gold	2003	Santo Domingo Games	Hard	(Chile) Marcelo Ríos	5–7, 7–6^{(8–6)}, 7–6^{(7–5)}

=== ATP World Tour ===
==== Singles: 6 (3 titles, 3 runner-ups) ====
Legend Grand Slam tournaments (0) Year-end championships (0) ATP Masters Series (0) ATP International Series Gold (0–1) ATP Tour (3–2)	Surface Clay (3–2) Hard (0–1)	Setting Outdoors (3–3)

Result	No.	Date	Tournament	Surface	Opponent	Score
Loss	1.	Feb 1995	Abierto Mexicano Telcel, Mexico	Clay	(Austria) Thomas Muster	6–7^{(4–7)}, 5–7
Win	1.	Jul 1995	Swedish Open, Sweden	Clay	(Norway) Christian Ruud	6–4, 6–4
Win	2.	May 1996	U.S. Men's Clay Court Championships, U.S.	Clay	(Sweden) Mats Wilander	6–4, 6–2
Win	3.	Apr 1998	Prague Open, Czech Republic	Clay	(Czech Republic) Sláva Doseděl	6–1, 6–4
Loss	2.	Sep 2001	Brasil Open, Brazil	Hard	(Czech Republic) Jan Vacek	6–2, 6–7^{(2–7)}, 3–6
Loss	3.	Feb 2002	Mexican Open, Mexico	Clay	(Spain) Carlos Moyá	6–7^{(4–7)}, 6–7^{(4–7)}

==== Doubles: 7 (7 titles) ====
Legend Grand Slam tournaments (0) Year-end championships (0) ATP Masters Series (0) ATP International Series Gold (1–0) ATP Tour (6–0)	Surface Clay (7–0)	Setting Outdoors (7–0)

Result	No.	Date	Tournament	Surface	Partner	Opponents	Score
Win	1.	Nov 1996	Chile Open, Chile	Clay	(Brazil) Gustavo Kuerten	(Romania) Dinu Pescariu (Spain) Albert Portas	6–4, 6–2
Win	2.	Apr 1997	Portugal Open, Portugal	Clay	(Brazil) Gustavo Kuerten	(Italy) Andrea Gaudenzi (Italy) Filippo Messori	6–2, 6–2
Win	3.	Jun 1997	Internazionali di Carisbo, Italy	Clay	(Brazil) Gustavo Kuerten	(United States) Dave Randall (United States) Jack Waite	6–2, 7–5
Win	4.	Jul 1997	Stuttgart Open, Germany	Clay	(Brazil) Gustavo Kuerten	(United States) Donald Johnson (United States) Francisco Montana	6–4, 6–4
Win	5.	Oct 1997	Bancolombia Open, Colombia	Clay	(Argentina) Luis Lobo	(Morocco) Karim Alami (Venezuela) Maurice Ruah	6–1, 6–3
Win	6.	July 1998	Swiss Open, Switzerland	Clay	(Brazil) Gustavo Kuerten	(Argentina) Daniel Orsanic (Czech Republic) Cyril Suk	6–4, 7–5
Win	7.	Mar 1999	Grand Prix Hassan II, Morocco	Clay	(Brazil) Jaime Oncins	(Italy) Massimo Ardinghi (Italy) Vincenzo Santopadre	6–2, 6–3

=== ATP Challenger Tour ===
==== Singles: 13 (7 titles, 6 runner-ups) ====
Category ATP Challenger Series (7–6)	Surface Clay (6–5) Hard (1–1)	Setting Outdoors (7–6)

Result	Date	Category	Tournament	Surface	Opponent	Score
Win	25 April 1993	Challenger	São Paulo Challenger I, Brazil	Clay	(Argentina) Pablo Escribano	6–2, 6–1
Win	18 July 1993	Challenger	Campinas Challenger, Brazil	Clay	(Brazil) Luiz Mattar	6–4, 6–2
Win	12 September 1993	Challenger	São Paulo Challenger II, Brazil	Hard	(Venezuela) Nicolás Pereira	7–5, 6–2
Loss	17 October 1993	Challenger	Recife Challenger, Brazil	Hard	(United Kingdom) Mark Petchey	2–6, 3–6
Loss	12 June 1994	Challenger	Campinas Challenger, Brazil	Clay	(France) Jérôme Golmard	4–6, 5–7
Loss	11 September 1994	Challenger	Natal Challenger, Brazil	Clay	(Spain) Alejo Mancisidor	3–6, 6–3, 5–7
Win	9 October 1994	Challenger	Ribeirão Preto Challenger, Brazil	Clay	(Ecuador) Luis Morejón	6–3, 6–3
Win	20 October 1996	Challenger	Cairo Challenger, Egypt	Clay	(Spain) Alberto Berasategui	3–6, 6–1, 6–2
Loss	8 June 1997	Challenger	Czech Open, Czech Republic	Clay	(Czech Republic) Bohdan Ulihrach	2–6, 6–4, 1–6
Loss	28 September 1997	Challenger	São Paulo Challenger, Brazil	Clay	(Argentina) Lucas Arnold Ker	4–6, 0–1 RET
Loss	17 May 1998	Challenger	Košice Open, Slovakia	Clay	(Slovakia) Dominik Hrbatý	5–7, 4–6
Win	18 October 1998	Challenger	São Paulo Challenger, Brazil	Clay	(Uruguay) Marcelo Filippini	6–1, 6–4
Win	8 May 2000	Challenger	Guadalajara Challenger, Mexico	Clay	(United States) Hugo Armando	7–5, 4–6, 6–4

==== Doubles: 10 (3 titles, 7 runner-ups) ====
Category ATP Challenger Series (3–7)	Surface Clay (2–6) Hard (1–1)	Setting Outdoors (3–7)

Result	Date	Category	Tournament	Surface	Partner	Opponents	Score
Loss	13 September 1992	Challenger	Guarujá Open, Brazil	Hard	(Brazil) Danilo Marcelino	(Venezuela) Maurice Ruah (Cuba) Mario Tabares	Walkover
Loss	27 September 1992	Challenger	Open Bogotá, Colombia	Clay	(Brazil) William Kyriakos	(Venezuela) Nicolás Pereira (Cuba) Mario Tabares	6–7, 5–7
Loss	23 February 1993	Challenger	Punta del Este Challenger, Uruguay	Clay	(Brazil) William Kyriakos	(France) Jean-Philippe Fleurian (Netherlands) Mark Koevermans	4–6, 1–6
Loss	2 May 1993	Challenger	Rome Challenger, Italy	Clay	(Brazil) Danilo Marcelino	(South Africa) David Nainkin (South Africa) Grant Stafford	0–6, 1–6
Loss	9 May 1993	Challenger	Jerusalem Challenger, Israel	Clay	(Brazil) Danilo Marcelino	(Israel) Gilad Bloom (Germany) Christian Saceanu	6–4, 4–6, 6–7
Win	12 September 1993	Challenger	São Paulo Challenger II, Brazil	Hard	(Brazil) Danilo Marcelino	(United States) Martin Blackman (Argentina) Gastón Etlis	6–1, 7–5
Win	17 November 1996	Challenger	Campinas Challenger, Brazil	Clay	(Brazil) Gustavo Kuerten	(Argentina) Pablo Albano (Ecuador) Nicolás Lapentti	6–2, 6–4
Loss	23 February 1997	Challenger	Punta del Este Challenger, Uruguay	Clay	(Brazil) Nelson Aerts	(Argentina) Daniel Orsanic (Argentina) Martín Rodríguez	2–6, 4–6
Win	2 March 1997	Challenger	Salinas Challenger, Ecuador	Clay	(Brazil) André Sá	(United States) Donald Johnson (United States) Francisco Montana	6–3, 3–6, 6–3
Loss	14 October 2000	Challenger	Guadalajara Challenger, Mexico	Clay	(Brazil) Flávio Saretta	(United States) Hugo Armando (Germany) Alexander Waske	6–7^{(4–7)}, 6–4, 6–7^{(7–9)}

=== Satellite tournaments ===
==== Singles: 4 (2 titles, 2 runner-ups) ====
Category Satellite (2–2)	Surface Clay (2–2)	Setting Outdoors (2–2)

Outcome	Date	Category	Tournament	Surface	Opponent	Score
Runner-up	14 April 1991	Satellite	Santa Maria, Brazil Masters 1 (Week 4)	Clay	(Brazil) Roberto Jabali	4–6, 7–6, 4–6
Runner-up	12 May 1991	Satellite	Novo Hamburgo, Brazil Masters 2 (Week 4)	Clay	(Brazil) João Zwetsch	2–6, 5–7
Winner	19 May 1991	Satellite	Rio de Janeiro, Brazil Masters 3 (Week 1)	Clay	(Argentina) Hernán Gumy	6–4, 7–5
Winner	9 June 1991	Satellite	Rio de Janeiro, Brazil Masters 3 (Week 3)	Clay	(Argentina) Hernán Gumy	6–4, 6–3

== Singles performance timeline ==
Key
W	F	SF	QF	#R	RR	Q#	P#	DNQ	A	Z#	PO	G	S	B	NMS	NTI	P	NH

(W) winner; (F) finalist; (SF) semifinalist; (QF) quarterfinalist; (#R) rounds 4, 3, 2, 1; (RR) round-robin stage; (Q#) qualification round; (P#) preliminary round; (DNQ) did not qualify; (A) absent; (Z#) Davis/Fed Cup Zonal Group (with number indication) or (PO) play-off; (G) gold, (S) silver or (B) bronze Olympic/Paralympic medal; (NMS) not a Masters tournament; (NTI) not a Tier I tournament; (P) postponed; (NH) not held; (SR) strike rate (events won / competed); (W–L) win–loss record.

Tournament	1991	1992	1993	1994	1995	1996	1997	1998	1999	2000	2001	2002	2003	SR	W–L	Win (%)
Grand Slam Tournaments
Australian Open	A	A	A	1R	A	1R	2R	1R	1R	1R	A	1R	1R	0 / 8	1–8	11%
French Open	A	A	4R	1R	3R	1R	2R	4R	SF	2R	3R	2R	Q1	0 / 10	18–10	64%
Wimbledon	A	A	A	1R	A	A	A	A	A	1R	2R	1R	A	0 / 4	1–4	20%
US Open	A	1R	1R	1R	1R	1R	3R	1R	2R	1R	2R	2R	A	0 / 11	5–11	31%
Win–loss	0–0	0–1	3–2	0–4	2–2	0–3	4–3	3–3	6–3	1–4	4–3	2–4	0–1	0 / 33	25–33	43%
ATP Masters Series^{1}
Indian Wells	A	A	Q3	A	A	A	1R	Q1	2R	1R	A	A	Q1	0 / 3	2–3	40%
Miami	A	A	Q1	2R	1R	1R	2R	A	A	3R	1R	1R	2R	0 / 8	5–8	38%
Monte Carlo	A	A	A	A	A	A	A	A	A	3R	2R	A	A	0 / 2	3–2	60%
Hamburg	A	A	A	A	A	A	A	A	2R	1R	A	1R	A	0 / 3	1–3	25%
Rome	A	A	A	A	A	A	A	A	3R	A	A	Q1	A	0 / 1	2–1	66%
Stuttgart^{2}	A	A	A	A	A	A	A	A	1R	A	A	A	A	0 / 1	0–1	0%
Paris	A	A	A	A	A	A	A	A	1R	A	A	A	A	0 / 1	0–1	0%
Win–loss	0–0	0–0	0–0	1–1	0–1	0–1	1–2	0–0	4–5	4–4	1–2	0–2	1–1	0 / 21	13–21	38%
National representation
Summer Olympics	NH	A	not held			4th	not held			A	not held			0 / 1	4–2	66%
Davis Cup	A	A	PO	Z1	Z1	PO	1R	1R	QF	SF	QF	1R	A	0 / 6	13–16	45%
Win–loss	0–0	0–0	0–2	1–1	2–0	7–4	1–2	1–2	1–2	2–3	1–1	0–1	0–0	0 / 7	17–18	49%
Career statistics
	1991	1992	1993	1994	1995	1996	1997	1998	1999	2000	2001	2002	2003	SR	W–L	Win (%)
Tournaments played	2	4	7	19	19	18	19	21	26	21	16	23	8	203		
Titles	0	0	0	0	1	1	0	1	0	0	0	0	0	3		50%
Finals	0	0	0	0	2	1	0	1	0	0	1	1	0	6		50%
Overall win–loss	2–2	3–4	6–9	15–20	24–18	20–20	25–21	19–22	28–28	16–24	18–17	20–24	6–8	3 / 203	202–217	48.21%
Win (%)	50%	43%	40%	43%	57%	50%	54%	46%	50%	40%	51%	45%	43%	48.21%		
Year-end ranking	206	167	98	92	66	93	68	57	29	100	72	75	213	$2,555,367		

^{1}The Masters Series included the Canada Masters and the Cincinnati Masters, but Meligeni never played in these tournaments.
^{2}This event was held in Stockholm until 1994, Essen in 1995, Stuttgart from 1996 through 2001 and Madrid from 2002 on.

== Titles detail ==
1. 1995 Swedish Open
Round	Opponent (Rank)	Score
1R	(Austria) Gilbert Schaller (31)	1–6, 6–3, 6–4
2R	(Spain) Óscar Martínez (87)	7–5, 6–1
QF	(Sweden) Magnus Norman (367)	6–4, 6–3
SF	(Spain) Carlos Costa (53)	4–6, 6–0, 6–2
F	(Norway) Christian Ruud (62)	6–4, 6–4

2. 1996 U.S. Men's Clay Court Championships
Round	Opponent (Rank)	Score
1R	(Italy) Fabio Maggi (220)	6–4, 6–3
2R	(Australia) Todd Woodbridge (28)	6–7^{(3–7)}, 7–6^{(7–4)}, 6–1
QF	(Australia) Patrick Rafter (86)	3–6, 7–6^{(9–7)}, 6–1
SF	(Australia) Jason Stoltenberg (61)	2–6, 6–0, 6–4
F	(Sweden) Mats Wilander (85)	6–4, 6–2

3. 1998 Prague Open
Round	Opponent (Rank)	Score
1R	(Russia) Andrei Cherkasov (184)	6–4, 6–3
2R	(Russia) Yevgeny Kafelnikov (6)	6–4, 6–4
QF	(Russia) Andrei Chesnokov (1346)	6–3, 6–1
SF	(Romania) Dinu Pescariu (123)	7–6^{(7–5)}, 7–6^{(7–2)}
F	(Czech Republic) Slava Doseděl (47)	6–1, 6–4

4. 2003 Santo Domingo Pan American Games
Round	Opponent (Rank)	Score
2R	(Argentina) Carlos Berlocq (291)	6–2, 6–2
3R	(Puerto Rico) Gabriel Montilla (687)	Walkover
QF	(United States) Jeff Morrison (145)	6–3, 6–4
SF	(Venezuela) José de Armas (284)	6–4, 6–2
F	(Chile) Marcelo Ríos (44)	5–7, 7–6^{(8–6)}, 7–6^{(7–5)}

Notes:

- 1995: Defeated three seeded players, en route to title: Schaller (2nd), Costa (5th) and Ruud (6th).
- 1996: In terms of games played, this was the most difficult title for Meligeni: 120 games and three tiebreaks.
- 1998: Defeated top-10 Kafelnikov (6) in the quarterfinal match; first top-10 win of that year (defeated Kafelnikov again, in Gstaad).
- 2003: Final event of Meligeni's career. Entered the event with a bye into the second round. Only victory over Ríos as a professional player.

== Grand Slam singles seedings ==
did not play not seeded Played in Qualifier Seeded 17–32 Seeded 9–16 Seeded 10–4 Seeded no. 3 Seeded no. 2 Seeded no. 1

Year	Australian Open	French Open	Wimbledon	US Open
1992	absent	absent	absent	not seeded
1993	absent	not seeded	absent	not seeded
1994	not seeded	not seeded	not seeded	not seeded
1995	absent	not seeded	absent	not seeded
1996	not seeded	not seeded	absent	not seeded
1997	not seeded	not seeded	absent	not seeded
1998	not seeded	not seeded	absent	not seeded
1999	not seeded	not seeded	absent	not seeded
2000	not seeded	not seeded	not seeded	not seeded
2001	absent	not seeded	not seeded	not seeded
2002	not seeded	not seeded	not seeded	not seeded
2003	not seeded	qualifier	absent	absent

== Record against top 10 players ==
Meligeni's match record against those who have been ranked in the top 10, with those who have been No. 1 in bold (ATP Tour, Grand Slam and Davis Cup matches).

- (United States) Pete Sampras: 1–1
- (United States) Andre Agassi: 0–5
- (Spain) Emilio Sánchez: 2–2
- (South Africa) Wayne Ferreira: 0–2
- (Sweden) Mikael Pernfors: 1–0
- (Sweden) Mats Wilander: 1–3
- (Spain) Alberto Berasategui: 1–3
- (Croatia) Goran Ivanišević: 0–3
- (Czech Republic) Karel Nováček: 1–0
- (Spain) Àlex Corretja: 2–6
- (Austria) Thomas Muster: 0–4
- (Sweden) Thomas Enqvist: 0–1
- (Spain) Carlos Costa: 2–2
- (Sweden) Magnus Norman: 1–0
- (France) Guy Forget: 0–1
- (Czech Republic) Jiří Novák: 0–5
- (United States) Michael Chang: 1–2
- (Australia) Patrick Rafter: 2–1
- (Russia) Andrei Chesnokov: 1–1
- (Spain) Albert Costa: 2–2
- (Australia) Mark Philippoussis: 1–0
- (Spain) Sergi Bruguera: 1–2
- (Chile) Marcelo Ríos: 0–4
- (Brazil) Gustavo Kuerten: 0–4
- (Slovakia) Karol Kučera: 3–0
- (Sweden) Magnus Larsson: 1–1
- (Spain) Félix Mantilla: 1–5
- (Russia) Yevgeny Kafelnikov: 2–3
- (Ukraine) Andrei Medvedev: 1–3
- (United States) Todd Martin: 0–3
- (Germany) Tommy Haas: 0–1
- (Sweden) Magnus Gustafsson: 1–2
- (United Kingdom) Greg Rusedski: 0–1
- (Chile) Nicolás Massú: 1–2
- (Switzerland) Marc Rosset: 3–0
- (United Kingdom) Tim Henman: 1–1
- (France) Cédric Pioline: 3–2
- (Sweden) Thomas Johansson: 2–2
- (Argentina) Gastón Gaudio: 1–2
- (Spain) Carlos Moyá: 1–4
- (Ecuador) Nicolás Lapentti: 1–2
- (Australia) Lleyton Hewitt: 0–3
- (Argentina) Guillermo Cañas: 0–1
- (Russia) Marat Safin: 0–2
- (Netherlands) Richard Krajicek: 0–1
- (Argentina) David Nalbandian: 0–2
- (Argentina) Guillermo Coria: 2–1
- (United States) Andy Roddick: 1–2
- (France) Arnaud Clément: 1–1
- (Russia) Nikolay Davydenko: 1–1
- (Czech Republic) Radek Štěpánek: 1–0
- (Thailand) Paradorn Srichaphan: 0–1
- (United States) Mardy Fish: 0–1
- (United States) James Blake: 0–1
- (Spain) Tommy Robredo: 0–1
- (Chile) Fernando González: 0–1
- (Spain) Juan Carlos Ferrero: 0–1
- (Czech Republic) Petr Korda: 1–0
- (United States) Jim Courier: 0–1

=== Top 10 wins ===
Year	1991	1992	1993	1994	1995	1996	1997	1998	1999	2000	2001	2002	2003	Total
Wins	0	0	0	0	0	0	1	2	5	0	0	1	0	**9**

No.	Player	Rank	Tournament	Surface	Rd	Score	Meligeni Rank
**1997**
1.	(United States) Michael Chang	2	Atlanta, United States	Clay	1R	2–6, 6–3, 6–4	72
**1998**
2.	(Russia) Yevgeny Kafelnikov	6	Prague, Czech Republic	Clay	2R	6–4, 6–4	75
3.	(Russia) Yevgeny Kafelnikov	7	Gstaad, Switzerland	Clay	1R	6–3, 4–6, 6–3	50
**1999**
4.	(United Kingdom) Tim Henman	7	Monte Carlo, Monaco	Clay	2R	6–7^{(5–7)}, 6–4, 7–5	51
5.	(United States) Pete Sampras	2	Rome, Italy	Clay	2R	6–3, 6–1	58
6.	(Australia) Patrick Rafter	3	French Open, Paris, France	Clay	3R	6–4, 6–2, 3–6, 6–3	54
7.	(Spain) Àlex Corretja	6	French Open, Paris, France	Clay	QF	6–2, 6–2, 6–0	54
8.	(Spain) Carlos Moyá	6	Long Island, United States	Hard	1R	6–7^{(1–7)}, 7–6^{(7–2)}, 6–3	29
**2002**
9.	(United States) Andy Roddick	9	Washington, D.C, United States	Hard	3R	6–4, 6–4	61

== Davis Cup ==
=== Participations: (13–16) ===
Group membership World Group (5–11) WG play-offs (2–3) Group I (6–2) Group II (0) Group III (0) Group IV (0)	Matches by Surface Hard (0–0) Clay (12–11) Grass (0–2) Carpet (1–3)	Matches by Type Singles (13–16) Doubles (0)	Matches by Setting Indoors (1–3) Outdoors (12–13)	Matches by Venue Brazil (10–5) Away (3–11)

- ▲ ▼ indicates the outcome of the Davis Cup match followed by the score, date, place of event, the zonal classification and its phase, and the court surface.

Rubber result	No.	Rubber	Match type (partner if any)	Opponent nation	Opponent player(s)	Score
▼1–3; 22–26 September 1993; Royal Primerose Tennis Club, Brussels, Belgium; World Group play-offs; clay surface
Defeat	1	II	Singles	Belgium	Filip Dewulf	2–6, 1–6, 5–7
Defeat	2	IV	Singles	Belgium	Bart Wuyts	3–6, 6–1, 6–7^{(5–7)}, 5–7
▼2–3; 8–10 July 1994; Club Lawn Tennis de la Exposición, Lima, Peru; Americas Zone Group I semifinal; clay surface
Victory	3	I	Singles	Peru	José Luis Noriega	6–2, 6–3, 7–6^{(7–4)}
Defeat	4	IV	Singles	Peru	Jaime Yzaga	6–4, 3–6, 4–6, 6–7^{(5–7)}
▲5–0; 3–5 February 1995; Barra Centre, Rio de Janeiro, Brazil; Americas Zone Group I quarterfinal; clay surface
Victory	5	II	Singles	Bahamas	Roger Smith	6–0, 7–5, 4–6, 6–0
Victory	6	V	Singles (dead rubber)	Bahamas	Mark Knowles	6–2, 3–6, 6–2
▲3–2; 9–11 February 1996; Estadio Nacional del Chile, Santiago, Chile; Americas Zone Group I quarterfinal; clay surface
Victory	7	I	Singles	Chile	Sergio Cortés	6–1, 6–1, 7–5
Defeat	8	IV	Singles	Chile	Marcelo Ríos	2–6, 6–7^{(2–7)}, 3–6
▲4–1; 5–7 February 1996; Tênis Clube de Santos, Santos, Brazil; Americas Zone Group I semifinal; clay surface
Victory	9	II	Singles	Venezuela	Jimy Szymanski	6–3, 7–6^{(7–2)}, 6–4
Victory	10	IV	Singles	Venezuela	Nicolás Pereira	6–4, 6–4, 6–3
▲4–1; 20–22 September 1996; Trans-America Hotel, São Paulo, Brazil; World Group play-offs; carpet(i) surface
Defeat	11	I	Singles	Austria	Thomas Muster	3–6, 3–6, 3–6
Victory	12	V	Singles	Austria	Markus Hipfl	Walkover (Note: Does not count as a win.)
▼1–4; 7–9 February 1997; Tennis Country Club, Ribeirão Preto, Brazil; World Group 1st round; clay surface
Defeat	13	II	Singles	United States	Jim Courier	6–3, 1–6, 4–6, 6–4, 4–6
Defeat	14	V	Singles (dead rubber)	United States	Alex O'Brien	5–7, 6–7^{(4–7)}
▲5–0; 19–21 September 1997; Costão Santinho Hotel, Florianópolis, Brazil; World Group play-offs; clay surface
Victory	15	II	Singles	New Zealand	Brett Steven	6–3, 7–5, 6–4
▼2–3; 3–5 April 1998; Moinhos de Vento Park, Porto Alegre, Brazil; World Group 1st round; clay surface
Defeat	16	II	Singles	Spain	Àlex Corretja	6–4, 4–6, 6–3, 4–6, 4–6
Defeat	17	V	Singles	Spain	Carlos Moyá	6–7^{(4–7)}, 2–6, 2–6
▲3–0; 25–27 September 1998; Costão Santinho Hotel, Florianópolis, Brazil; World Group play-offs; clay surface
Victory	18	I	Singles	Romania	Adrian Voinea	6–1, 6–4, 7–6^{(7–3)}
▲3–2; 2–4 April 1999; Lérida Tennis Club, Lérida, Spain; World Group 1st round; clay surface
Defeat	19	I	Singles	Spain	Carlos Moyá	2–6, 7–6^{(7–3)}, 0–6, 4–6
▼2–3; 16–18 July 1999; Sports Palace, Pau, France; World Group quarterfinal; carpet(i) surface
Defeat	20	II	Singles	France	Cédric Pioline	3–6, 3–6, 3–6
Victory	21	V	Singles (dead rubber)	France	Sébastien Grosjean	6–7^{(5–7)}, 6–4, 6–2
▲4–1; 4–6 February 2000; Municipal Centre, Florianópolis, Brazil; World Group quarterfinal; clay surface
Victory	22	I	Singles	France	Cédric Pioline	7–5, 5–7, 4–6, 6–1, 6–4
▲3–2; 7–9 April 2000; Marapendi Club, Rio de Janeiro, Brazil; World Group quarterfinal; clay surface
Defeat	23	I	Singles	Slovakia	Dominik Hrbatý	1–6, 5–7, 2–6
Victory	24	V	Singles	Slovakia	Karol Kučera	5–7, 7–6^{(8–6)}, 6–2, 6–4
▼0–5; 14–16 July 2000; ANZ Stadium, Brisbane, Australia; World Group semifinal; grass surface
Defeat	25	II	Singles	Australia	Lleyton Hewitt	4–6, 2–6, 3–6
Defeat	26	V	Singles (dead rubber)	Australia	Patrick Rafter	3–6, 4–6
▲4–1; 9–11 February 2001; Veiga de Almeida University, Rio de Janeiro, Brazil; World Group 1st round; clay surface
Victory	27	II	Singles	Morocco	Hicham Arazi	6–4, 5–7, 6–3, 4–3 RET
▼1–3; 6–8 April 2001; Florianapolis Court Tennis Centre, Florianópolis, Brazil; World Group quarterfinal; clay surface
Defeat	28	II	Singles	Australia	Lleyton Hewitt	3–6, 3–6, 3–6
▼1–4; 8–10 February 2002; Sports Culture Palace, Ostrava, Czech Republic; World Group 1st round; carpet(i) surface
Defeat	29	II	Singles	Czech Republic	Bohdan Ulihrach	3–6, 4–6, 4–6
▲4–0; 20–22 September 2002; Veiga de Almeida University, Rio de Janeiro, Brazil; World Group play-offs; clay surface
Victory	30	I	Singles	Canada	Frank Dancevic	6–2, 7–5, 2–6, 7–5
