= 1996 Swedish Open – Singles =

Singles
- 1996 Swedish Open

Final
- Champion: (Sweden) Magnus Gustafsson
- Runner-up: (Ukraine) Andriy Medvedev
- Score: 6–1, 6–3

Details
- Draw: 32
- Seeds: 8

Events
Singles	Doubles
← 1995 ·	Swedish Open	· 1997 →

Fernando Meligeni was the defending champion but lost in the first round to Marcelo Filippini.

Magnus Gustafsson won in the final 6–1, 6–3 against Andriy Medvedev.

== Seeds ==
A champion seed is indicated in bold text while text in italics indicates the round in which that seed was eliminated.

1. (Sweden) Stefan Edberg (semifinals)
2. (Spain) Carlos Costa (semifinals)
3. n/a
4. (Sweden) Magnus Gustafsson (champion)
5. (Ukraine) Andriy Medvedev (final)
6. (Spain) Tomás Carbonell (quarterfinals)
7. (Belgium) Filip Dewulf (first round)
8. (Norway) Christian Ruud (first round)

== Draw ==
=== Key ===
- Q = Qualifier
- WC = Wild card
- LL = Lucky loser
- Alt = Alternate
- ITF = ITF entry
- PR = Protected ranking
- SR = Special ranking
- SE = Special exempt
- JE = Junior exempt
- JR = Junior Accelerator Programme entrant
- CO = College Accelerator Programme entrant
- NG = Next Gen Accelerator Program entrant
- w/o = Walkover
- r = Retired
- d = Defaulted

First round
1	(Sweden) **S Edberg**	**6**	**6**
Q	(United States) J Waite	2	2
(Sweden) M Tillström	2	4
Q	(Sweden) **L Jonsson**	**6**	**6**
Q	(Sweden) **T Nydahl**	**6**	**6**
(Germany) C-U Steeb	4	1
(Sweden) **T Johansson**	**7^{8}**	4	**7^{7}**
7	(Belgium) F Dewulf	6^{6}	**6**	6^{4}
4	(Sweden) **M Gustafsson**	**6**	**6**
WC	(Sweden) B Rehnquist	2	0
(Australia) **R Fromberg**	**6**	**7**
LL	(Sweden) C Bergström	3	5
(Ecuador) **N Lapentti**	**6**	2	**6**
(France) J Golmard	2	**6**	1
(Hungary) S Noszály	6^{5}	2
6	(Spain) **T Carbonell**	**7^{7}**	**6**
5	(Ukraine) **A Medvedev**	**6**	**6**
(Russia) A Volkov	3	4
(Sweden) **M Norman**	**6**	4	**6**
(Czech Republic) D Rikl	3	**6**	3
(Spain) **G Blanco**	**6**	**7^{7}**
(United States) J Tarango	4	6^{4}
WC	(Sweden) **P Fredriksson**	**6**	**6**
LL	(Sweden) N Utgren	4	0
8	(Norway) C Ruud	4	3
(Sweden) **M Larsson**	**6**	**6**
(Brazil) F Meligeni	2	**6**	3
(Uruguay) **M Filippini**	**6**	3	**6**
(Ecuador) **L Morejón**	**7**	**6**
WC	(Sweden) A Järryd	5	2
Q	(Sweden) F Jonsson	0	1
2	(Spain) **C Costa**	**6**	**6**

Second round
1	(Sweden) **S Edberg**	**6**	6^{2}	**6**
Q	(Sweden) L Jonsson	2	**7^{7}**	3
Q	(Sweden) T Nydahl	5	0
(Sweden) **T Johansson**	**7**	**6**
4	(Sweden) **M Gustafsson**	1	**7^{7}**	**6**
(Australia) R Fromberg	**6**	6^{4}	2
(Ecuador) N Lapentti	2	5
6	(Spain) **T Carbonell**	**6**	**7**
5	(Ukraine) **A Medvedev**	**6**	**6**
(Sweden) M Norman	4	4
(Spain) **G Blanco**	4	**6**	**6**
WC	(Sweden) P Fredriksson	**6**	3	4
(Sweden) **M Larsson**	2	**6**	**6**
(Uruguay) M Filippini	**6**	0	3
(Ecuador) L Morejón	6^{5}	4
2	(Spain) **C Costa**	**7^{7}**	**6**

Quarterfinals
1	(Sweden) **S Edberg**	**6**	**6**
(Sweden) T Johansson	3	4
4	(Sweden) **M Gustafsson**	**6**	**6**
6	(Spain) T Carbonell	1	1
5	(Ukraine) **A Medvedev**	3	**6**	**6**
(Spain) G Blanco	**6**	2	1
(Sweden) M Larsson	2	1
2	(Spain) **C Costa**	**6**	**6**

Semifinals
1	(Sweden) S Edberg	3	6^{4}
4	(Sweden) **M Gustafsson**	**6**	**7^{7}**
5	(Ukraine) **A Medvedev**	**6**	**6**
2	(Spain) C Costa	4	4

Final
4	(Sweden) **Magnus Gustafsson**	**6**	**6**
5	(Ukraine) Andriy Medvedev	1	3
