= 2001 Abierto Mexicano Pegaso – Men's singles =

Men's singles
- 2001 Abierto Mexicano Pegaso

Final
- Champion: (Brazil) Gustavo Kuerten
- Runner-up: (Spain) Galo Blanco
- Score: 6–4, 6–2

Events
Singles	men	women
Doubles	men	women
← 2000 ·	Mexican Open	· 2002 →

Juan Ignacio Chela was the defending champion but did not compete that year.

Gustavo Kuerten won in the final 6–4, 6–2 against Galo Blanco.

== Seeds ==
1. (Brazil) Gustavo Kuerten (champion)
2. (Argentina) Franco Squillari (first round)
3. (Spain) Carlos Moyá (semifinals)
4. (Argentina) Gastón Gaudio (quarterfinals)
5. (Spain) Albert Costa (second round)
6. (Spain) Fernando Vicente (first round)
7. (Spain) Francisco Clavet (first round)
8. (Morocco) Hicham Arazi (second round)

== Draw ==
=== Key ===
- Q = Qualifier
- WC = Wild card
- LL = Lucky loser
- Alt = Alternate
- ITF = ITF entry
- PR = Protected ranking
- SR = Special ranking
- SE = Special exempt
- JE = Junior exempt
- JR = Junior Accelerator Programme entrant
- CO = College Accelerator Programme entrant
- NG = Next Gen Accelerator Program entrant
- w/o = Walkover
- r = Retired
- d = Defaulted

=== Finals ===
Semifinals
1	(Brazil) Gustavo Kuerten	6	6
Q	(Argentina) Guillermo Cañas	1	4
3	(Spain) Carlos Moyá	4	7^{7}	5
WC	(Spain) Galo Blanco	6	6^{3}	7

Final
1	(Brazil) Gustavo Kuerten	6	6
WC	(Spain) Galo Blanco	4	2

=== Top half ===
First round
1	(Brazil) G Kuerten	6	6
(Spain) F Mantilla	4	1
(Belgium) C Rochus	3	0
LL	(Brazil) A Simoni	6	6
(Czech Republic) J Vaněk	6	7^{7}
WC	(Mexico) A Hernández	3	6^{4}
WC	(Brazil) F Meligeni	6	4	6
7	(Spain) F Clavet	3	6	3
4	(Argentina) G Gaudio	7	7^{8}
Q	(Argentina) M Rodríguez	5	6^{6}
Q	(Peru) L Horna	4	4
(Morocco) Y El Aynaoui	6	6
Q	(Argentina) G Cañas	6	6
(Spain) D Sánchez	4	2
(Morocco) K Alami	2	3
8	(Morocco) H Arazi	6	6

Second round
1	(Brazil) G Kuerten	6	6
LL	(Brazil) A Simoni	4	0
(Czech Republic) J Vaněk	5	6^{5}
WC	(Brazil) F Meligeni	7	7^{7}
4	(Argentina) G Gaudio	7^{7}	2	6
(Morocco) Y El Aynaoui	6^{4}	6	3
Q	(Argentina) G Cañas	6	6
8	(Morocco) H Arazi	3	1

Quarterfinals
1	(Brazil) G Kuerten	6^{3}	6	3
WC	(Brazil) F Meligeni	7^{7}	3	2^{r}
4	(Argentina) G Gaudio	4	4
Q	(Argentina) G Cañas	6	6

Semifinals
1	(Brazil) G Kuerten	6	6
Q	(Argentina) G Cañas	1	4

=== Bottom half ===
First round
5	(Spain) A Costa	6	7^{7}
(Spain) Á Calatrava	4	6^{4}
(Spain) A Portas	3	3
(Spain) S Bruguera	6	6
(Chile) N Massú	3	3
(Spain) A Martín	6	6
(Australia) R Fromberg	4	4
3	(Spain) C Moyá	6	6
6	(Spain) F Vicente	6^{5}	1
(France) A di Pasquale	7^{7}	6
Q	(Norway) C Ruud	6	6
(Germany) D Elsner	3	3
(Argentina) M Zabaleta	7^{7}	6
(Spain) G Puentes	6^{3}	4
WC	(Spain) G Blanco	3	6	7^{7}
2	(Argentina) F Squillari	6	1	6^{3}

Second round
5	(Spain) A Costa	5	3
(Spain) S Bruguera	7	6
(Spain) A Martín	3	3
3	(Spain) C Moyá	6	6
(France) A di Pasquale	4	6^{6}
Q	(Norway) C Ruud	6	7^{8}
(Argentina) M Zabaleta	6	6^{4}	4
WC	(Spain) G Blanco	4	7^{7}	6

Quarterfinals
(Spain) S Bruguera	6	5	4
3	(Spain) C Moyá	1	7	6
Q	(Norway) C Ruud	4	4
WC	(Spain) G Blanco	6	6

Semifinals
3	(Spain) C Moyá	4	7^{7}	5
WC	(Spain) G Blanco	6	6^{3}	7

== Qualifying ==
=== Qualifying seeds ===
1. (Spain) Tommy Robredo (first round)
2. (Brazil) Alexandre Simoni (qualifying competition, lucky loser)
3. (Austria) Markus Hipfl (qualifying competition)
4. (Costa Rica) Juan Antonio Marín (qualifying competition)
5. (Spain) Óscar Serrano (first round)
6. (Peru) Luis Horna (qualified)
7. (Norway) Christian Ruud (qualified)
8. (Argentina) Martín Rodríguez (qualified)

=== Qualifiers ===
1. (Argentina) Guillermo Cañas
2. (Peru) Luis Horna
3. (Argentina) Martín Rodríguez
4. (Norway) Christian Ruud

=== Lucky loser ===
1. (Brazil) Alexandre Simoni

=== Qualifying draws ===
==== First qualifier ====
First round					Qualifying competition
1	(Spain) Tommy Robredo	5	7^{7}	3
	(Greece) Solon Peppas	7	6^{3}	6	(Greece) Solon Peppas	3	4
	(Argentina) Guillermo Cañas	7^{7}	6		(Argentina) Guillermo Cañas	6	6
5	(Spain) Óscar Serrano	6^{3}	1

==== Second qualifier ====
First round					Qualifying competition
2	(Brazil) Alexandre Simoni	7^{10}	6^{6}	6
WC	(Argentina) David Nalbandian	6^{8}	7^{8}	3	2	(Brazil) Alexandre Simoni	6^{2}	4
WC	(Mexico) Marcello Amador	2	2		6	(Peru) Luis Horna	7^{7}	6
6	(Peru) Luis Horna	6	6

==== Third qualifier ====
First round				Qualifying competition
3	(Austria) Markus Hipfl	7^{7}	7^{9}
	(Argentina) Gastón Etlis	6^{4}	6^{7}	3	(Austria) Markus Hipfl	7^{8}	4	4
	(Spain) Álex López Morón	4	2	8	(Argentina) Martín Rodríguez	6^{6}	6	6
8	(Argentina) Martín Rodríguez	6	6

==== Fourth qualifier ====
First round				Qualifying competition
4	(Costa Rica) Juan Antonio Marín	7	7
WC	(Spain) Feliciano López	5	5	4	(Costa Rica) Juan Antonio Marín	3	2
	(France) Nicolas Coutelot	1	4	7	(Norway) Christian Ruud	6	6
7	(Norway) Christian Ruud	6	6
