= 1995 Swedish Open – Doubles =

Doubles
- 1995 Swedish Open

Final
- Champions: (Sweden) Jan Apell (Sweden) Jonas Björkman
- Runners-up: (Australia) Jon Ireland (Australia) Andrew Kratzmann
- Score: 6–3, 6–0

Events
| Singles | Doubles |
| ← 1994 · | Swedish Open | · 1996 → |

Jan Apell and Jonas Björkman successfully defended their title by defeating Jon Ireland and Andrew Kratzmann 6–3, 6–0 in the final.

== Seeds ==
1. (Sweden) Jan Apell / (Sweden) Jonas Björkman (champions)
2. (Spain) Sergio Casal / (Spain) Emilio Sánchez (quarterfinals)
3. (South Africa) Lan Bale / (South Africa) John-Laffnie de Jager (quarterfinals)
4. (Sweden) Anders Järryd / (Sweden) Mikael Tillström (first round)

== Draw ==
=== Key ===
- Q = Qualifier
- WC = Wild card
- LL = Lucky loser
- Alt = Alternate
- ITF = ITF entry
- PR = Protected ranking
- SR = Special ranking
- SE = Special exempt
- JE = Junior exempt
- JR = Junior Accelerator Programme entrant
- CO = College Accelerator Programme entrant
- NG = Next Gen Accelerator Program entrant
- w/o = Walkover
- r = Retired
- d = Defaulted

=== Draw ===
First round
1 | (Sweden) J Apell (Sweden) J Björkman | 6 | 6
(United States) B Behrens (United States) J Waite | 3 | 2
(Sweden) O Kristiansson (Sweden) LA Wahlgren | 4 | 6 | 6
WC | (Sweden) K Flygt (Sweden) M Norman | 6 | 4 | 2
4 | (Sweden) A Järryd (Sweden) M Tillström | 6 | 5 | 2
(United States) J Belloli (Germany) M Huning | 4 | 7 | 6
(Spain) J Burillo (Spain) JA Conde | 3 | 6 | 3
WC | (Sweden) M Pernfors (Sweden) M Wilander | 6 | 3 | 0^{r}
(Australia) J Ireland (Australia) A Kratzmann | 3 | 6 | 6
Q | (Hungary) S Noszály (Germany) T Theine | 6 | 4 | 4
(Germany) MK Goellner (Germany) B Karbacher | 5 | 4
3 | (South Africa) L Bale (South Africa) JL de Jager | 7 | 6
(Spain) T Carbonell (Spain) C Costa | 6 | 4
(Sweden) P Nyborg (Sweden) M Renström | 7 | 6
WC | (Sweden) J Gunnarsson (Sweden) P Lundgren | 5 | 5
2 | (Spain) S Casal (Spain) E Sánchez | 7 | 7

Quarterfinals
1 | (Sweden) J Apell (Sweden) J Björkman | 6 | 7
(Sweden) O Kristiansson (Sweden) LA Wahlgren | 3 | 5
(United States) J Belloli (Germany) M Huning | 7 | 4 | 7
(Spain) J Burillo (Spain) JA Conde | 6 | 6 | 5
(Australia) J Ireland (Australia) A Kratzmann | 6 | 6
3 | (South Africa) L Bale (South Africa) JL de Jager | 3 | 4
(Sweden) P Nyborg (Sweden) M Renström | 7 | 4 | 6
2 | (Spain) S Casal (Spain) E Sánchez | 5 | 6 | 1

Semifinals
1 | (Sweden) J Apell (Sweden) J Björkman | 6 | 6
(United States) J Belloli (Germany) M Huning | 4 | 3
(Australia) J Ireland (Australia) A Kratzmann | 4 | 7 | 6
(Sweden) P Nyborg (Sweden) M Renström | 6 | 5 | 3

Final
1 | (Sweden) J Apell (Sweden) J Björkman | 6 | 6
(Australia) J Ireland (Australia) A Kratzmann | 3 | 0
