= 2001 Abierto Mexicano Pegaso =

- Date: February 26 – March 4
- Edition: 8th (men) / 1st (women)
- Surface: Clay / Outdoor
- Location: Acapulco, Mexico

Champions

Men's singles
- (Brazil) Gustavo Kuerten

Women's singles
- (South Africa) Amanda Coetzer

Men's doubles
- (United States) Donald Johnson / (Brazil) Gustavo Kuerten

Women's doubles
- (Spain) María José Martínez / (Spain) Anabel Medina Garrigues
- Abierto Mexicano

The 2001 Abierto Mexicano Pegaso was a tennis tournament played on outdoor clay courts at the Fairmont Acapulco Princess in Acapulco in Mexico that was part of the International Series Gold of the 2001 ATP Tour and of Tier III of the 2001 WTA Tour. The tournament was held from February 26 through March 4, 2001.

== Finals ==
=== Men's singles ===
(Brazil) Gustavo Kuerten defeated (Spain) Galo Blanco 6–4, 6–2

- It was Kuerten's 2nd title of the year and the 19th of his career.

=== Women's singles ===
(South Africa) Amanda Coetzer defeated (Russia) Elena Dementieva 2–6, 6–1, 6–2

- It was Coetzer's 2nd title of the year and the 16th of her career.

=== Men's doubles ===
(United States) Donald Johnson / (Brazil) Gustavo Kuerten defeated (South Africa) David Adams / (Argentina) Martín García 6–3, 7–6^{(7–5)}

- It was Johnson's 1st title of the year and the 15th of his career. It was Kuerten's 3rd title of the year and the 20th of his career.

=== Women's doubles ===
(Spain) María José Martínez / (Spain) Anabel Medina Garrigues defeated (Spain) Virginia Ruano Pascual / (Argentina) Paola Suárez 6–4, 6–7^{(5–7)}, 7–5

- It was Martínez's 1st title of the year and the 1st of her career. It was Medina Garrigues' 1st title of the year and the 1st of her career.
