= 2002 Abierto Mexicano Pegaso – Men's doubles =

Men's doubles
- 2002 Abierto Mexicano Pegaso

Final
- Champions: (United States) Bob Bryan (United States) Mike Bryan
- Runners-up: (Czech Republic) Martin Damm (Czech Republic) David Rikl
- Score: 6–1, 3–6, [10–2]

Events
Singles	men	women
Doubles	men	women
- Mexican Open

Donald Johnson and Gustavo Kuerten were the defending champions but only Johnson competed that year with Jared Palmer.

Johnson and Palmer lost in the semifinals to Bob Bryan and Mike Bryan.

The Bryan brothers won in the final 6–1, 3–6, [10–2] against Martin Damm and David Rikl.

== Seeds ==
1. (United States) Donald Johnson / (United States) Jared Palmer (semifinals)
2. (Czech Republic) Martin Damm / (Czech Republic) David Rikl (final)
3. (United States) Bob Bryan / (United States) Mike Bryan (champions)
4. (South Africa) David Adams / (Argentina) Martín García (first round)

== Draw ==
Key

- Q = Qualifier
- WC = Wild card
- LL = Lucky loser
- Alt = Alternate
- ITF = ITF entry
- PR = Protected ranking
- SR = Special ranking
- SE = Special exempt
- JE = Junior exempt
- JR = Junior Accelerator Programme entrant
- CO = College Accelerator Programme entrant
- NG = Next Gen Accelerator Program entrant
- w/o = Walkover
- r = Retired
- d = Defaulted

First round
1	(United States) D Johnson (United States) J Palmer	7^{9}	6
(Sweden) J Landsberg (United States) J Thomas	6^{7}	3
(Argentina) M Hood (Argentina) D Orsanic	4	4
(Italy) E Artoni (Brazil) D Melo	6	6
3	(United States) B Bryan (United States) M Bryan	6	6
(Spain) C Moyá (Spain) A Portas	4	2
WC	(Ecuador) N Lapentti (Ecuador) L Morejón	3	7^{7}	[11]
WC	(Mexico) A Hernández (Brazil) F Meligeni	6	6^{4}	[9]
(Australia) P Hanley (Australia) N Healey	6^{3}	7^{7}	[9]
(Australia) B Ellwood (Australia) S Huss	7^{7}	6^{4}	[11]
(Argentina) G Cañas (Spain) F Vicente	7^{7}	6
4	(South Africa) D Adams (Argentina) M García	6^{1}	1
(Sweden) S Aspelin (Australia) A Kratzmann	2	6	[9]
(Argentina) G Etlis (Argentina) M Rodríguez	6	3	[11]
WC	(Germany) T Haas (United States) G Weiner	3	4
2	(Czech Republic) M Damm (Czech Republic) D Rikl	6	6

Quarterfinals
1	(United States) D Johnson (United States) J Palmer	6	6
(Italy) E Artoni (Brazil) D Melo	1	2
3	(United States) B Bryan (United States) M Bryan	7^{7}	6
WC	(Ecuador) N Lapentti (Ecuador) L Morejón	6^{3}	4
(Australia) B Ellwood (Australia) S Huss	4	4
(Argentina) G Cañas (Spain) F Vicente	6	6
(Argentina) G Etlis (Argentina) M Rodríguez	6	3	[11]
2	(Czech Republic) M Damm (Czech Republic) D Rikl	2	6	[13]

Semifinals
1	(United States) D Johnson (United States) J Palmer	2	6^{4}
3	(United States) B Bryan (United States) M Bryan	6	7^{7}
(Argentina) G Cañas (Spain) F Vicente	3	5
2	(Czech Republic) M Damm (Czech Republic) D Rikl	6	7

Final
3	(United States) B Bryan (United States) M Bryan	6	3	[10]
2	(Czech Republic) M Damm (Czech Republic) D Rikl	1	6	[2]
