= 1996 Swedish Open =

- Date: 8–14 July
- Edition: 49th
- Category: World Series
- Draw: 32S / 16D
- Prize money: $303,000
- Surface: Clay / outdoor
- Location: Båstad, Sweden

Champions

Singles
- (Sweden) Magnus Gustafsson

Doubles
- (Sweden) David Ekerot / (United States) Jeff Tarango
- Swedish Open

The 1996 Swedish Open was a men's tennis tournament played on outdoor clay courts in Båstad in Sweden and was part of the World Series of the 1996 ATP Tour. It was the 49th edition of the tournament and was held from 8 July until 14 July 1996. Fourth-seeded Magnus Gustafsson won the singles title.

== Finals ==
=== Singles ===
(Sweden) Magnus Gustafsson defeated (Ukraine) Andriy Medvedev 6–1, 6–3

- It was Gustafsson's 2nd singles title of the year and the 9th of his career.

=== Doubles ===
(Sweden) David Ekerot / (United States) Jeff Tarango defeated (Australia) Joshua Eagle / (Sweden) Peter Nyborg 6–4, 6–1

- It was Ekerot's 1st title of the year and the 1st of his career. It was Tarango's 1st title of the year and the 6th of his career.
