= 1995 Swedish Open =

- Date: 10–16 July
- Edition: 48th
- Category: World Series
- Draw: 32S / 16D
- Prize money: $303,000
- Surface: Clay / outdoor
- Location: Båstad, Sweden

Champions

Singles
- (Brazil) Fernando Meligeni

Doubles
- (Sweden) Jan Apell / (Sweden) Jonas Björkman
- Swedish Open

The 1995 Swedish Open was a men's tennis tournament played on outdoor clay courts. It was the 48th edition of the Swedish Open, and part of the World Series of the 1995 ATP Tour. It took place between 10 July and 16 July 1995, in Båstad, Sweden. Unseeded Fernando Meligeni won the singles title.

== Singles main draw entrants ==
=== Seeds ===
Country	Player	Ranking^{1}	Seed
SWE	Jonas Björkman	22	1
AUT	Gilbert Schaller	25	2
GER	Bernd Karbacher	29	3
CZE	Bohdan Ulihrach	51	4
ESP	Carlos Costa	54	5
NOR	Christian Ruud	62	6
GER	Marc-Kevin Goellner	69	7
SWE	Anders Järryd	70	8

- ^{1} Rankings as of 3 July 1995.

=== Other entrants ===
The following players received wildcards into the main draw:

- (Sweden) Christian Bergström
- (Sweden) Magnus Gustafsson
- (Sweden) Mikael Pernfors

The following players received entry from the qualifying draw:

- (Sweden) David Engel
- (Sweden) Lars-Anders Wahlgren
- (Sweden) Magnus Norman
- (Sweden) Patrik Fredriksson

== Doubles main draw entrants ==
=== Seeds ===
Country	Player	Country	Player	Rank^{1}	Seed
SWE	Jan Apell	SWE	Jonas Björkman	32	1
ESP	Sergio Casal	ESP	Emilio Sánchez	56	2
RSA	Lan Bale	RSA	John-Laffnie de Jager	68	3
SWE	Anders Järryd	SWE	Mikael Tillström	139	4

- ^{1} Rankings are as of 3 July 1995.

== Finals ==
=== Singles ===
- (Brazil) Fernando Meligeni defeated (Norway) Christian Ruud, 6–4, 6–4

=== Doubles ===
- (Sweden) Jan Apell / (Sweden) Jonas Björkman defeated (Australia) Jon Ireland / (Australia) Andrew Kratzmann, 6–3, 6–0
