= 2001 Abierto Mexicano Pegaso – Women's singles =

Women's singles
- 2001 Abierto Mexicano Pegaso

Final
- Champion: (South Africa) Amanda Coetzer
- Runner-up: (Russia) Elena Dementieva
- Score: 2–6, 6–1, 6–2

Details
- Draw: 30
- Seeds: 8

Events
Singles	men	women
Doubles	men	women
- Mexican Open

Amanda Coetzer won in the final 2–6, 6–1, 6–2 against Elena Dementieva.

== Seeds ==
A champion seed is indicated in bold text while text in italics indicates the round in which that seed was eliminated. The top two seeds received a bye to the second round.

1. (South Africa) **Amanda Coetzer (champion)**
2. (Russia) Elena Dementieva (final)
3. (France) Sandrine Testud (second round)
4. (Argentina) Paola Suárez (semifinals)
5. (Italy) Silvia Farina Elia (first round)
6. (United States) Corina Morariu (quarterfinals)
7. (Spain) Ángeles Montolio (quarterfinals)
8. (Italy) Tathiana Garbin (first round)

== Draw ==
Key

- Q = Qualifier
- WC = Wild card
- LL = Lucky loser
- Alt = Alternate
- ITF = ITF entry
- PR = Protected ranking
- SR = Special ranking
- SE = Special exempt
- JE = Junior exempt
- JR = Junior Accelerator Programme entrant
- CO = College Accelerator Programme entrant
- NG = Next Gen Accelerator Program entrant
- w/o = Walkover
- r = Retired
- d = Defaulted

=== Final ===
Final
1	(South Africa) **Amanda Coetzer**	2	**6**	**6**
2	(Russia) Elena Dementieva	**6**	1	2

=== Section 1 ===
First round
(Spain) **M Sánchez Lorenzo**	**6**	**6**
(Switzerland) M Vavrinec	3	3
(Australia) E Dominikovic	**6**	2	5
(Hungary) **R Kuti-Kis**	2	**6**	**7**
(Spain) **A Medina Garrigues**	**6**	2	**6**
8	(Italy) T Garbin	4	**6**	3
4	(Argentina) **P Suárez**	**6**	0
(Poland) M Grzybowska	2	0^{r}
Q	(Spain) M J Martínez	**6**	3	4
(Austria) **P Wartusch**	2	**6**	**6**
WC	(Czech Republic) S Kleinová	**6**	3	4
Q	(Madagascar) **D Randriantefy**	2	**6**	**6**
(Spain) M Marrero	3	4
7	(Spain) **Á Montolio**	**6**	**6**

Second round
1	(South Africa) **A Coetzer**	**6**	**6**
(Spain) M Sánchez Lorenzo	4	1
(Hungary) **R Kuti-Kis**	**6**	0	**6**
(Spain) A Medina Garrigues	4	**6**	4
4	(Argentina) **P Suárez**	**6**	**6**
(Austria) P Wartusch	1	3
Q	(Madagascar) D Randriantefy	3	**6**	1
7	(Spain) **Á Montolio**	**6**	3	**6**

Quarterfinals
1	(South Africa) **A Coetzer**	4	**6**	**7^{9}**
(Hungary) R Kuti-Kis	**6**	3	6^{7}
4	(Argentina) **P Suárez**	**6**	**6**
7	(Spain) Á Montolio	2	4

Semifinals
1	(South Africa) **A Coetzer**	**6**	**6**
4	(Argentina) P Suárez	4	3

=== Section 2 ===
First round
5	(Italy) S Farina Elia	4	2
(Spain) **V Ruano Pascual**	**6**	**6**
(Spain) **N Llagostera**	**6**	**7^{7}**
WC	(Mexico) E Valdés	2	6^{2}
(Switzerland) E Gagliardi	6^{2}	1
(Argentina) **M Díaz Oliva**	**7^{7}**	**6**
Q	(Germany) A Barna	6^{2}	3
3	(France) **S Testud**	**7^{7}**	**6**
6	(United States) **C Morariu**	**6**	**6**
(Paraguay) R de los Ríos	4	3
(Austria) **S Plischke**	**7^{7}**	**6**
(Federal Republic of Yugoslavia) S Načuk	6^{2}	2
Q	(Slovenia) **K Srebotnik**	5	**7^{7}**	**6**
(Spain) C Torrens Valero	**7**	6^{1}	4

Second round
(Spain) V Ruano Pascual	1	**6**	4
(Spain) **N Llagostera**	**6**	4	**6**
(Argentina) **M Díaz Oliva**	**6**	0
3	(France) S Testud	2	0^{r}
6	(United States) **C Morariu**	**6**	**6**
(Austria) S Plischke	2	1
Q	(Slovenia) K Srebotnik	4	5
2	(Russia) **E Dementieva**	**6**	**7**

Quarterfinals
(Spain) **N Llagostera**	**6**	**6**
(Argentina) M Díaz Oliva	4	4
6	(United States) C Morariu	4	2
2	(Russia) **E Dementieva**	**6**	**6**

Semifinals
(Spain) N Llagostera	2	1
2	(Russia) **E Dementieva**	**6**	**6**

== Qualifying ==
=== Qualifying seeds ===
1. (n/a)
2. (Colombia) Catalina Castaño (second round)
3. (Germany) **Anca Barna (qualified)**
4. (Hungary) Katalin Marosi-Aracama (second round, withdrew)
5. (Venezuela) Milagros Sequera (first round)
6. (Japan) Saori Obata (first round)
7. (Spain) **María José Martínez Sánchez (qualified)**
8. (Spain) Lourdes Domínguez Lino (second round)

=== Qualifiers ===
1. **(Madagascar) Dally Randriantefy**
2. **(Slovenia) Katarina Srebotnik**
3. **(Germany) Anca Barna**
4. **(Spain) María José Martínez Sánchez**

=== Qualifying draw ===
==== First qualifier ====
First round
Alt	**(Brazil) Joana Cortez**	**6**	**6**
(Spain) Mariam Ramón Climent	4	2
(Italy) Germana Di Natale	2	3
**(Argentina) María Emilia Salerni**	**6**	**6**
(Italy) Antonella Serra Zanetti	3	4
**(Madagascar) Dally Randriantefy**	**6**	**6**
(Argentina) Clarisa Fernández	5	2
8	**(Spain) Lourdes Domínguez Lino**	**7**	**6**

Second round
Alt	(Brazil) Joana Cortez	3	2
**(Argentina) María Emilia Salerni**	**6**	**6**
**(Madagascar) Dally Randriantefy**	**6**	6^{5}	**7**
8	(Spain) Lourdes Domínguez Lino	1	**7^{7}**	5

Qualifying competition
(Argentina) María Emilia Salerni	2	**6**	4
**(Madagascar) Dally Randriantefy**	**6**	3	**6**

==== Second qualifier ====
First round
2	**(Colombia) Catalina Castaño**	**6**	**6**
(Australia) Amanda Grahame	4	2
**(Slovenia) Katarina Srebotnik**	**6**	**6**
WC	(Mexico) Lourdes López	0	1
WC	(Mexico) María José López Herrera	2	4
**(Republic of Ireland) Kelly Liggan**	**6**	**6**
**(Spain) Conchita Martínez Granados**	1	**6**	**6**
5	(Venezuela) Milagros Sequera	**6**	2	3

Second round
2	(Colombia) Catalina Castaño	3	2
**(Slovenia) Katarina Srebotnik**	**6**	**6**
(Republic of Ireland) Kelly Liggan	3	1
**(Spain) Conchita Martínez Granados**	**6**	**6**

Qualifying competition
**(Slovenia) Katarina Srebotnik**	**6**	**6**
(Spain) Conchita Martínez Granados	1	2

==== Third qualifier ====
First round
3	**(Germany) Anca Barna**	**6**	4	**7**
(Austria) Evelyn Fauth	1	**6**	5
WC	(Mexico) Alejandra Rivero	0	3
**(Spain) Rosa María Andrés Rodríguez**	**6**	**6**
WC	(Mexico) Melissa Torres Sandoval	**7^{8}**	0	5
**(Spain) Gisela Riera**	6^{6}	**6**	**7**
**(United States) Samantha Reeves**	**6**	**6**
6	(Japan) Saori Obata	0	1

Second round
3	**(Germany) Anca Barna**	5	**6**	**6**
(Spain) Rosa María Andrés Rodríguez	**7**	2	3
**(Spain) Gisela Riera**	**7^{7}**	3	**6**
(United States) Samantha Reeves	6^{3}	**6**	1

Qualifying competition
3	**(Germany) Anca Barna**	**6**	5	**6**
(Spain) Gisela Riera	2	**7**	4

==== Fourth qualifier ====
First round
4	**(Hungary) Katalin Marosi-Aracama**	**6**	**7**
(Slovenia) Tina Križan	1	5
**(Hungary) Petra Mandula**	**7**	**6**
(Spain) Eva Bes	5	1
**(Spain) Ainhoa Goñi**	**6**	**6**
(Bulgaria) Elena Pampoulova	2	0
(Czech Republic) Eva Martincová	6^{2}	0
7	**(Spain) María José Martínez Sánchez**	**7^{7}**	**6**

Second round
4	(Hungary) Katalin Marosi-Aracama
**(Hungary) Petra Mandula**	w/o
(Spain) Ainhoa Goñi	2	2
7	**(Spain) María José Martínez Sánchez**	**6**	**6**

Qualifying competition
(Hungary) Petra Mandula	0	3
7	**(Spain) María José Martínez Sánchez**	**6**	**6**
