= 2002 Abierto Mexicano Pegaso =

- Date: February 25 – March 3
- Edition: 9th (men) / 2nd (women)
- Surface: Clay / Outdoor
- Location: Acapulco, Mexico

Champions

Men's singles
- (Spain) Carlos Moyá

Women's singles
- (Slovenia) Katarina Srebotnik

Men's doubles
- (United States) Bob Bryan / (United States) Mike Bryan

Women's doubles
- (Spain) Virginia Ruano Pascual / (Argentina) Paola Suárez
- Abierto Mexicano

The 2002 Abierto Mexicano Pegaso was a tennis tournament played on outdoor clay courts at the Fairmont Acapulco Princess in Acapulco in Mexico that was part of the International Series Gold of the 2002 ATP Tour and of Tier III of the 2002 WTA Tour. The tournament was held from February 25 through March 3, 2002.

== Finals ==
=== Men's singles ===
(Spain) Carlos Moyá defeated (Brazil) Fernando Meligeni 7–6^{(7–4)}, 7–6^{(7–4)}

- It was Moyá's 1st title of the year and the 8th of his career.

=== Women's singles ===
(Slovenia) Katarina Srebotnik defeated (Argentina) Paola Suárez 6–7^{(1–7)}, 6–4, 6–2

- It was Srebotnik's only title of the year and the 2nd of her career.

=== Men's doubles ===
(United States) Bob Bryan / (United States) Mike Bryan defeated (Czech Republic) Martin Damm / (Czech Republic) David Rikl 6–1, 3–6, [10–2]

- It was Bob Bryan's 1st title of the year and the 5th of his career. It was Mike Bryan's 1st title of the year and the 5th of his career.

=== Women's doubles ===
(Spain) Virginia Ruano Pascual / (Argentina) Paola Suárez defeated (Slovenia) Tina Križan / (Slovenia) Katarina Srebotnik 7–5, 6–1

- It was Ruano Pascual's 2nd title of the year and the 15th of her career. It was Suárez's 2nd title of the year and the 22nd of her career.
