= 2002 Abierto Mexicano Pegaso – Women's doubles =

Women's doubles
- 2002 Abierto Mexicano Pegaso

Final
- Champions: (Spain) Virginia Ruano Pascual (Argentina) Paola Suárez
- Runners-up: (Slovenia) Tina Križan (Slovenia) Katarina Srebotnik
- Score: 7–5, 6–1

Details
- Draw: 16 (1WC/1Q)
- Seeds: 4

Events
Singles	men	women
Doubles	men	women
← 2001 ·	Mexican Open	· 2003 →

María José Martínez Sánchez and Anabel Medina Garrigues were the defending champions, but none competed this year. Martínez Sánchez decided to compete in Scottsdale at the same week.

Virginia Ruano Pascual and Paola Suárez won the title by defeating Tina Križan and Katarina Srebotnik 7–5, 6–1 in the final.

== Seeds ==
1. (Spain) Virginia Ruano Pascual / (Argentina) Paola Suárez (champions)
2. (Spain) Conchita Martínez / (Argentina) Patricia Tarabini (first round)
3. (Slovenia) Tina Križan / (Slovenia) Katarina Srebotnik (final)
4. (Russia) Elena Dementieva / (Russia) Janette Husárová (semifinals)

== Draw ==
=== Key ===
- Q = Qualifier
- WC = Wild card
- LL = Lucky loser
- Alt = Alternate
- SE = Special exempt
- PR = Protected ranking
- ITF = ITF entry
- JE = Junior exempt
- w/o = Walkover
- r = Retired
- d = Defaulted
- SR = Special ranking

=== Draw ===
First round
1	(Spain) V Ruano Pascual (Argentina) P Suárez	6	7
(Australia) E Dominikovic (Germany) C Schneider	2	5
Q	(Spain) N Llagostera Vives (Spain) M Ramón Climent	2	4
(Bulgaria) L Bacheva (Spain) C Torrens Valero	6	6
4	(Russia) E Dementieva (Slovakia) J Husárová	6	6
(Spain) E Bes (Paraguay) R de los Ríos	3	4
(Argentina) L Montalvo (Argentina) ME Salerni	6	7
(Greece) E Daniilidou (Italy) T Garbin	1	5
(Czech Republic) K Koukalová (Czech Republic) A Vašková	4	5
(Czech Republic) E Martincová (Netherlands) A van Exel	6	7
(Argentina) M Díaz Oliva (Romania) A Vanc	3	2
3	(Slovenia) T Križan (Slovenia) K Srebotnik	6	6
(Spain) L Domínguez Lino (Spain) C Martínez Granados	w/o
(Greece) B Lamade (France) É Loit
WC	(Spain) A Sánchez Vicario (Mexico) M Torres Sandoval	1	6	6
2	(Spain) C Martínez (Argentina) P Tarabini	6	2	3

Quarterfinals
1	(Spain) V Ruano Pascual (Argentina) P Suárez	6	6
(Bulgaria) L Bacheva (Spain) C Torrens Valero	0	2
4	(Russia) E Dementieva (Slovakia) J Husárová	6	6
(Argentina) L Montalvo (Argentina) ME Salerni	1	4
(Czech Republic) E Martincová (Netherlands) A van Exel	1	3
3	(Slovenia) T Križan (Slovenia) K Srebotnik	6	6
(Spain) L Domínguez Lino (Spain) C Martínez Granados	6	6
WC	(Spain) A Sánchez Vicario (Mexico) M Torres Sandoval	4	2

Semifinals
1	(Spain) V Ruano Pascual (Argentina) P Suárez	7	2	6
4	(Russia) E Dementieva (Slovakia) J Husárová	5	6	3
3	(Slovenia) T Križan (Slovenia) K Srebotnik	6	6
(Spain) L Domínguez Lino (Spain) C Martínez Granados	3	0

Final
1	(Spain) V Ruano Pascual (Argentina) P Suárez	7	6
3	(Slovenia) T Križan (Slovenia) K Srebotnik	5	1

== Qualifying ==
=== Seeds ===
1. (Spain) Nuria Llagostera Vives / (Spain) Mariam Ramón Climent (qualified)
2. (Federal Republic of Yugoslavia) Katarina Dašković / (Germany) Lydia Steinbach (first round)

=== Qualifiers ===
1. (Spain) Nuria Llagostera Vives / (Spain) Mariam Ramón Climent

=== Qualifying draw ===
First round
1	(Spain) Nuria Llagostera Vives (Spain) Mariam Ramón Climent	8
WC	(Mexico) María Eugenia Brito (Mexico) Erika Clarke	3
(Argentina) Melisa Arévalo (Uruguay) Daniela Olivera	8
2	(Federal Republic of Yugoslavia) Katarina Dašković (Germany) Lydia Steinbach	5

Qualifying competition
1	(Spain) Nuria Llagostera Vives (Spain) Mariam Ramón Climent	6	6
(Argentina) Melisa Arévalo (Uruguay) Daniela Olivera	4	4
