= 2002 Abierto Mexicano Pegaso – Women's singles =

Women's singles
- 2002 Abierto Mexicano Pegaso

Final
- Champion: (Slovenia) Katarina Srebotnik
- Runner-up: (Argentina) Paola Suárez
- Score: 6–7^{(1–7)}, 6–4, 6–2

Details
- Draw: 30 (2WC/4Q)
- Seeds: 8

Events
Singles	men	women
Doubles	men	women
- Mexican Open

Amanda Coetzer was the defending champion, but lost in quarterfinals to Paola Suárez.

Katarina Srebotnik won the title by defeating Paola Suárez 6–7^{(1–7)}, 6–4, 6–2 in the final.

== Seeds ==
The first two seeds received a bye into the second round.

1. (Russia) Elena Dementieva (semifinals)
2. (Spain) Arantxa Sánchez Vicario (second round)
3. (South Africa) Amanda Coetzer (quarterfinals)
4. (Spain) Cristina Torrens Valero (quarterfinals)
5. (Spain) Conchita Martínez (first round)
6. (Spain) Gala León García (second round)
7. (Argentina) Paola Suárez (final)
8. (Argentina) Mariana Díaz Oliva (first round)

== Draw ==
Key

- Q = Qualifier
- WC = Wild card
- LL = Lucky loser
- Alt = Alternate
- ITF = ITF entry
- PR = Protected ranking
- SR = Special ranking
- SE = Special exempt
- JE = Junior exempt
- JR = Junior Accelerator Programme entrant
- CO = College Accelerator Programme entrant
- NG = Next Gen Accelerator Program entrant
- w/o = Walkover
- r = Retired
- d = Defaulted

=== Finals ===
Semifinals
1	(Russia) Elena Dementieva	5	3
7	(Argentina) Paola Suárez	7	6
(Slovenia) Katarina Srebotnik	5	6	6
(Russia) Anna Kournikova	7	3	1

Finals
7	(Argentina) Paola Suárez	7^{7}	4	2
(Slovenia) Katarina Srebotnik	6^{1}	6	6

=== Top half ===
First round
Q	(Argentina) ME Salerni	6	6
Q	(Spain) N Llagostera Vives	1	2
(Germany) J Kandarr	6	7^{7}
(Hungary) R Kuti-Kis	4	6^{3}
Q	(France) É Loit	6	6
5	(Spain) C Martínez	4	3
3	(South Africa) A Coetzer	6	6
WC	(Mexico) E Valdés	0	1
(Australia) E Dominikovic	2	3
(Spain) V Ruano Pascual	6	6
(France) C Beigbeder	6	6
(Greece) E Daniilidou	4	2
(Paraguay) R de los Ríos	1	3
7	(Argentina) P Suárez	6	6

Second round
1	(Russia) E Dementieva	7^{7}	6^{5}	6
Q	(Argentina) ME Salerni	6^{5}	7^{7}	1
(Germany) J Kandarr	6	4	3
Q	(France) É Loit	3	6	6
3	(South Africa) A Coetzer	6	6
(Spain) V Ruano Pascual	2	2
(France) C Beigbeder	3	0
7	(Argentina) P Suárez	6	6

Quarterfinals
1	(Russia) E Dementieva	6	0
Q	(France) É Loit	4	0^{r}
3	(South Africa) A Coetzer	3	4
7	(Argentina) P Suárez	6	6

Semifinals
1	(Russia) E Dementieva	5	3
7	(Argentina) P Suárez	7	6

=== Bottom half ===
First round
6	(Spain) G León García	6	6
(Israel) A Smashnova	4	2
(Switzerland) E Gagliardi	2	4
(Slovenia) K Srebotnik	6	6
(Spain) E Bes	6	6
WC	(Mexico) MJ López Herrera	2	2
(Czech Republic) A Gerši	3	3
4	(Spain) C Torrens Valero	6	6
8	(Argentina) M Díaz Oliva	4	5
(Russia) A Kournikova	6	7
(Italy) T Garbin	6	6
Q	(Romania) A Vanc	2	3
(Germany) B Lamade	2	4
(Slovakia) J Husárová	6	6

Second round
6	(Spain) G León García	4	4
(Slovenia) K Srebotnik	6	6
(Spain) E Bes	1	2
4	(Spain) C Torrens Valero	6	6
(Russia) A Kournikova	6	6
(Italy) T Garbin	1	2
(Slovakia) J Husárová	3	6	6
2	(Spain) A Sánchez Vicario	6	2	3

Quarterfinals
(Slovenia) K Srebotnik	3	7^{7}	6
4	(Spain) C Torrens Valero	6	6^{4}	4
(Russia) A Kournikova	6	6
(Slovakia) J Husárová	3	4

Semifinals
(Slovenia) K Srebotnik	5	6	6
(Russia) A Kournikova	7	3	1

== Qualifying ==
=== Seeds ===
1. (Italy) Maria Elena Camerin (first round, retired)
2. (France) Émilie Loit (qualified)
3. (Bulgaria) Lubomira Bacheva (qualifying competition)
4. (Argentina) María Emilia Salerni (qualified)
5. (Spain) Nuria Llagostera Vives (qualified)
6. (Czech Republic) Klára Koukalová (qualifying competition)
7. (Czech Republic) Alena Vašková (second round)
8. (Spain) Conchita Martínez Granados (first round)

=== Qualifiers ===
1. (Romania) Andreea Vanc
2. (France) Émilie Loit
3. (Spain) Nuria Llagostera Vives
4. (Argentina) María Emilia Salerni

=== Qualifying draw ===
==== First qualifier ====
First round
1	(Italy) Maria Elena Camerin	3	0^{r}
(Ukraine) Yuliana Fedak	6	1
(Uruguay) Daniela Olivera	4	6	7^{7}
(Spain) María Rosa Sitja-Gilbert	6	3	6^{3}
(Romania) Andreea Vanc	4	6	6
(Austria) Petra Rüssegger	6	1	3
(Romania) Raluca Sandu	6	3	6
8	(Spain) Conchita Martínez Granados	3	6	4

Second round
(Ukraine) Yuliana Fedak	6	6
(Uruguay) Daniela Olivera	2	4
(Romania) Andreea Vanc	6	7
(Romania) Raluca Sandu	2	5

Qualifying competition
(Ukraine) Yuliana Fedak	7^{7}	5	4
(Romania) Andreea Vanc	6^{5}	7	6

==== Second qualifier ====
First round
2	(France) Émilie Loit	2	6	7^{7}
(Spain) María Sánchez Lorenzo	6	3	6^{2}
WC	(Mexico) Erika Clarke	6^{5}	2
(Germany) Caroline Schneider	7^{7}	6
(United States) Tiffany Dabek	6^{3}	6	6
WC	(Mexico) María Eugenia Brito	7^{7}	3	3
(Argentina) Melisa Arévalo	0	7^{7}	5
7	(Czech Republic) Alena Vašková	6	6^{4}	7

Second round
2	(France) Émilie Loit	6	6
(Germany) Caroline Schneider	2	3
(United States) Tiffany Dabek	7^{7}	6
7	(Czech Republic) Alena Vašková	6^{3}	3

Qualifying competition
2	(France) Émilie Loit	6	6
(United States) Tiffany Dabek	3	4

==== Third qualifier ====
First round
3	(Bulgaria) Lubomira Bacheva	6	6
WC	(Mexico) Melissa Torres Sandoval	3	3
(Czech Republic) Eva Martincová	2	4
(Spain) Lourdes Domínguez Lino	6	6
(Germany) Scarlett Werner
(Italy) Giulia Casoni	w/o
(Spain) Mariam Ramón Climent	2	7^{7}	4
5	(Spain) Nuria Llagostera Vives	6	6^{4}	6

Second round
3	(Bulgaria) Lubomira Bacheva	7	6
(Spain) Lourdes Domínguez Lino	5	3
(Italy) Giulia Casoni	4	4
5	(Spain) Nuria Llagostera Vives	6	6

Qualifying competition
3	(Bulgaria) Lubomira Bacheva	6	2	3
5	(Spain) Nuria Llagostera Vives	2	6	6

==== Fourth qualifier ====
First round
4	(Argentina) María Emilia Salerni	6	6
(Ukraine) Olena Schmelzer	3	1
(Netherlands) Anousjka van Exel	6	6
WC	(Mexico) Alejandra Rivero	1	0
(Germany) Julia Schruff	3	6	6
(Federal Republic of Yugoslavia) Katarina Dašković	6	3	2
(Germany) Lydia Steinbach	3	5
6	(Czech Republic) Klára Koukalová	6	7

Second round
4	(Argentina) María Emilia Salerni	6	6
(Netherlands) Anousjka van Exel	2	4
(Germany) Julia Schruff	5	6	3
6	(Czech Republic) Klára Koukalová	7	1	6

Qualifying competition
4	(Argentina) María Emilia Salerni	1	7	7^{7}
6	(Czech Republic) Klára Koukalová	6	5	6^{3}
