= 2001 Abierto Mexicano Pegaso – Women's doubles =

Women's doubles
- 2001 Abierto Mexicano Pegaso

Final
- Champions: (Spain) María José Martínez (Spain) Anabel Medina Garrigues
- Runners-up: (Spain) Virginia Ruano Pascual (Argentina) Paola Suárez
- Score: 6–4, 6–7^{(5–7)}, 7–5

Events
Singles	men	women
Doubles	men	women
Mexican Open	· 2002 →

María José Martínez and Anabel Medina Garrigues won in the final 6–4, 6–7^{(5–7)}, 7–5 against Virginia Ruano Pascual and Paola Suárez.

== Seeds ==
Champion seeds are indicated in bold text while text in italics indicates the round in which those seeds were eliminated.

1. (Spain) Virginia Ruano Pascual / (Argentina) Paola Suárez (final)
2. (South Africa) Amanda Coetzer / (United States) Corina Morariu (quarterfinals)
3. (Slovenia) Tina Križan / (Slovenia) Katarina Srebotnik (semifinals)
4. (Italy) Tathiana Garbin / (Slovakia) Janette Husárová (quarterfinals)

== Draw ==
=== Key ===
- Q = Qualifier
- WC = Wild card
- LL = Lucky loser
- Alt = Alternate
- SE = Special exempt
- PR = Protected ranking
- ITF = ITF entry
- JE = Junior exempt
- w/o = Walkover
- r = Retired
- d = Defaulted
- SR = Special ranking

First round
1	(Spain) **V Ruano Pascual** (Argentina) **P Suárez**	**6**	**6**
WC	(Mexico) M J López Herrera (Mexico) M Torres Sandoval	2	4
(Czech Republic) **E Martincová** (Germany) **E Wagner**	2	**6**	**6**
(Spain) R M Andrés (Spain) C Torrens Valero	**6**	0	3
3	(Slovenia) **T Križan** (Slovenia) **K Srebotnik**	**6**	**6**
(Hungary) P Mandula (Hungary) K Marosi-Aracama	4	1
(Italy) **S Farina Elia** (Switzerland) **E Gagliardi**	**6**	4	**6**
(Spain) E Bes (Argentina) M Díaz-Oliva	4	**6**	0
(Brazil) J Cortez (Spain) C Martínez Granados	**6**	2	4
(Argentina) **L Montalvo** (Argentina) **M E Salerni**	3	**6**	**6**
(Spain) L Domínguez Lino (Spain) G Riera	4	**7**	4
4	(Italy) **T Garbin** (Slovakia) **J Husárová**	**6**	5	**6**
(Federal Republic of Yugoslavia) S Načuk (United States) S Reeves	6^{5}	3
Q	(Spain) **M J Martínez** (Spain) **A Medina Garrigues**	**7^{7}**	**6**
(Austria) S Plischke (Austria) P Wartusch	6^{5}	1
2	(South Africa) **A Coetzer** (United States) **C Morariu**	**7^{7}**	**6**

Quarterfinals
1	(Spain) **V Ruano Pascual** (Argentina) **P Suárez**	**6**	**6**
(Czech Republic) E Martincová (Germany) E Wagner	3	1
3	(Slovenia) **T Križan** (Slovenia) **K Srebotnik**	**7^{11}**	**6**
(Italy) S Farina Elia (Switzerland) E Gagliardi	6^{9}	3
(Argentina) **L Montalvo** (Argentina) **M E Salerni**	**6**	3	**6**
4	(Italy) T Garbin (Slovakia) J Husárová	1	**6**	4
Q	(Spain) **M J Martínez** (Spain) **A Medina Garrigues**	**6**	3	**6**
2	(South Africa) A Coetzer (United States) C Morariu	2	**6**	2

Semifinals
1	(Spain) **V Ruano Pascual** (Argentina) **P Suárez**	4	**6**	**6**
3	(Slovenia) T Križan (Slovenia) K Srebotnik	**6**	3	2
(Argentina) L Montalvo (Argentina) M E Salerni	0	4
Q	(Spain) **M J Martínez** (Spain) **A Medina Garrigues**	**6**	**6**

Final
1	(Spain) Virginia Ruano Pascual (Argentina) Paola Suárez	4	**7^{7}**	5
Q	(Spain) **María José Martínez** (Spain) **Anabel Medina Garrigues**	**6**	6^{5}	**7**

== Qualifying ==
=== Seeds ===
1. (Australia) Evie Dominikovic / (Australia) Trudi Musgrave (second round)
2. (Spain) Mariam Ramón Climent / (Spain) María Sánchez Lorenzo (qualifying competition)

=== Qualifiers ===
1. **(Spain) María José Martínez / (Spain) Anabel Medina Garrigues**

=== Qualifying draw ===
First round
1	**(Australia) E Dominikovic** **(Australia) T Musgrave**	**8**
(Germany) A Barna (Australia) A Grahame	4
**(Spain) M J Martínez** **(Spain) A Medina Garr.**	**8**
(Spain) A Goñi (Republic of Ireland) K Liggan	3
(Poland) M Grzybowska (Spain) M Marrero	6
**(Japan) R Fujiwara** **(Japan) S Obata**	**8**
WC	(Mexico) M E Brito (Mexico) A Rivero	5
2	**(Spain) M Ramón Clim.** **(Spain) M Sánchez Lor.**	**8**

Second round
1	(Australia) E Dominikovic (Australia) T Musgrave	6
**(Spain) M J Martínez** **(Spain) A Medina Garr.**	**8**
(Japan) R Fujiwara (Japan) S Obata	4
2	**(Spain) M Ramón Clim.** **(Spain) M Sánchez Lor.**	**8**

Qualifying competition
**(Spain) M J Martínez** **(Spain) A Medina Garr.**	**7**	**7**
2	(Spain) M Ramón Clim. (Spain) M Sánchez Lor.	5	5
