= 2001 Abierto Mexicano Pegaso – Men's doubles =

Men's doubles
- 2001 Abierto Mexicano Pegaso

Final
- Champions: (United States) Donald Johnson (Brazil) Gustavo Kuerten
- Runners-up: (South Africa) David Adams (Argentina) Martín García
- Score: 6–3, 7–6^{(7–5)}

Events
Singles	men	women
Doubles	men	women
- Mexican Open

Byron Black and Donald Johnson were the defending champions but only Johnson competed that year with Gustavo Kuerten.

Johnson and Kuerten won in the final 6–3, 7–6^{(7–5)} against David Adams and Martín García.

== Seeds ==
1. (South Africa) David Adams / (Argentina) Martín García (final)
2. (Argentina) Lucas Arnold / (Spain) Tomás Carbonell (first round)
3. (Argentina) Pablo Albano / (Brazil) Jaime Oncins (quarterfinals)
4. (Argentina) Gastón Etlis / (Argentina) Martín Rodríguez (semifinals)

== Draw ==
Key

- Q = Qualifier
- WC = Wild card
- LL = Lucky loser
- Alt = Alternate
- ITF = ITF entry
- PR = Protected ranking
- SR = Special ranking
- SE = Special exempt
- JE = Junior exempt
- JR = Junior Accelerator Programme entrant
- CO = College Accelerator Programme entrant
- NG = Next Gen Accelerator Program entrant
- w/o = Walkover
- r = Retired
- d = Defaulted

First round
1	(South Africa) D Adams (Argentina) M García	6^{3}	6	6
(Italy) C Brandi (Argentina) D Orsanic	7^{7}	2	3
(Spain) Á López Morón (Spain) J Velasco Jr.	7^{7}	6
(United States) D Bowen (South Africa) P Rosner	6^{5}	2
3	(Argentina) P Albano (Brazil) J Oncins	6	6
WC	(Spain) F Clavet (Brazil) F Meligeni	4	4
(Spain) A Martín (Israel) E Ran	6^{7}	1
(Spain) A Portas (Spain) G Puentes	7^{9}	6
(Argentina) M Hood (Argentina) S Prieto	4	6	6
WC	(Mexico) B Echagaray (Mexico) S González	6	1	1
Q	(The Bahamas) M Merklein (United States) M Sprengelmeyer	7^{7}	6^{6}	2
4	(Argentina) G Etlis (Argentina) M Rodríguez	6^{5}	7^{8}	6
(South Africa) B Haygarth (Brazil) A Prieto	6	6
WC	(Mexico) E Abaroa (Mexico) Ó Ortiz	4	3
(United States) D Johnson (Brazil) G Kuerten	7^{7}	6
2	(Argentina) L Arnold (Spain) T Carbonell	6^{2}	2

Quarterfinals
1	(South Africa) D Adams (Argentina) M García	6	7^{7}
(Spain) Á López Morón (Spain) J Velasco Jr.	3	6^{4}
3	(Argentina) P Albano (Brazil) J Oncins	7^{8}	4	4
(Spain) A Portas (Spain) G Puentes	6^{6}	6	6
(Argentina) M Hood (Argentina) S Prieto	2	6	6^{5}
4	(Argentina) G Etlis (Argentina) M Rodríguez	6	3	7^{7}
(South Africa) B Haygarth (Brazil) A Prieto	6^{1}	1
(United States) D Johnson (Brazil) G Kuerten	7^{7}	6

Semifinals
1	(South Africa) D Adams (Argentina) M García	6	6
(Spain) A Portas (Spain) G Puentes	2	3
4	(Argentina) G Etlis (Argentina) M Rodríguez	6^{2}	1
(United States) D Johnson (Brazil) G Kuerten	7^{7}	6

Final
1	(South Africa) D Adams (Argentina) M García	3	6^{5}
(United States) D Johnson (Brazil) G Kuerten	6	7^{7}

== Qualifying ==
=== Seeds ===
1. (The Bahamas) Mark Merklein / (United States) Mitch Sprengelmeyer (qualified)
2. (Argentina) Guillermo Cañas / (Chile) Nicolás Massú (qualifying competition)

=== Qualifiers ===
1. (The Bahamas) Mark Merklein / (United States) Mitch Sprengelmeyer

=== Qualifying draw ===
First round
1	(The Bahamas) Mark Merklein (United States) Mitch Sprengelmeyer	6	6
WC	(Morocco) Hicham Arazi (France) Nicolas Coutelot	4	4
(Peru) Luis Horna (Spain) Tommy Robredo	2	4
2	(Argentina) Guillermo Cañas (Chile) Nicolás Massú	6	6

Qualifying competition
1	(The Bahamas) Mark Merklein (United States) Mitch Sprengelmeyer	6	5	6
2	(Argentina) Guillermo Cañas (Chile) Nicolás Massú	4	7	3
