= 1995 Swedish Open – Singles =

Singles
- 1995 Swedish Open

Final
- Champion: (Brazil) Fernando Meligeni
- Runner-up: (Norway) Christian Ruud
- Score: 6–4, 6–4

Details
- Draw: 32
- Seeds: 8

Events
Singles	Doubles
← 1994 ·	Swedish Open	· 1996 →

Bernd Karbacher was the defending champion but lost in the quarterfinals to Tomás Carbonell.

Fernando Meligeni won in the final 6–4, 6–4 against Christian Ruud.

== Seeds ==
A champion seed is indicated in bold text while text in italics indicates the round in which that seed was eliminated.

1. (Sweden) Jonas Björkman (first round)
2. (Austria) Gilbert Schaller (first round)
3. (Germany) Bernd Karbacher (second round)
4. (Czech Republic) Bohdan Ulihrach (second round)
5. (Spain) Carlos Costa (semifinal)
6. (Norway) Christian Ruud (final)
7. (Germany) Marc-Kevin Goellner (quarterfinals)
8. (Sweden) Anders Järryd (first round)

== Draw ==
=== Key ===
- Q = Qualifier
- WC = Wild card
- LL = Lucky loser
- Alt = Alternate
- ITF = ITF entry
- PR = Protected ranking
- SR = Special ranking
- SE = Special exempt
- JE = Junior exempt
- JR = Junior Accelerator Programme entrant
- CO = College Accelerator Programme entrant
- NG = Next Gen Accelerator Program entrant
- w/o = Walkover
- r = Retired
- d = Defaulted

First round
1	(Sweden) J Björkman	2	4
(Belgium) **K Goossens**	**6**	**6**
(Spain) J Burillo	4	4
(Argentina) **H Gumy**	**6**	**6**
(Spain) Á López Morón	4	2
(Sweden) **L Jönsson**	**6**	**6**
(Sweden) M Wilander	5	3
7	(Germany) **M-K Goellner**	**7**	**6**
4	(Czech Republic) **B Ulihrach**	**6**	**6**
(Spain) E Sánchez	3	1
(Germany) C Arriens	6^{8}	4
(Denmark) **F Fetterlein**	**7^{10}**	**6**
(Uruguay) M Filippini	4	**7**	3
WC	(Sweden) **M Gustafsson**	**6**	6^{3}	**6**
Q	(Sweden) L-A Wahlgren	3	0
6	(Norway) **C Ruud**	**6**	**6**
5	(Spain) **C Costa**	4	**6**	**6**
Q	(Sweden) P Fredriksson	**6**	3	1
WC	(Sweden) **C Bergström**	**7^{7}**	**6**
(Sweden) J Apell	6^{4}	4
(Hungary) S Noszály	6^{1}	1
(Spain) **T Carbonell**	**7^{7}**	**6**
WC	(Sweden) M Pernfors	1	5
3	(Germany) **B Karbacher**	**6**	**7**
8	(Sweden) A Järryd	4	3
Q	(Sweden) **M Norman**	**6**	**6**
(Sweden) **M Tillström**	**6**	**7^{11}**
(United States) R Agénor	4	6^{9}
(Spain) **Ó Martínez**	1	**6**	**7^{7}**
Q	(Sweden) D Engel	**6**	2	6^{1}
(Brazil) **F Meligeni**	1	**6**	**6**
2	(Austria) G Schaller	**6**	1	4

Second round
(Belgium) **K Goossens**	w/o
(Argentina) H Gumy
(Sweden) L Jönsson	4	1
7	(Germany) **M-K Goellner**	**6**	**6**
4	(Czech Republic) B Ulihrach	6^{9}	5
(Denmark) **F Fetterlein**	**7^{11}**	**7**
WC	(Sweden) M Gustafsson	4	**6**	3
6	(Norway) **C Ruud**	**6**	1	**6**
5	(Spain) **C Costa**	**6**	**7^{7}**
WC	(Sweden) C Bergström	4	6^{2}
(Spain) **T Carbonell**	5	**6**	**6**
3	(Germany) B Karbacher	**7**	2	1
Q	(Sweden) **M Norman**	**6**	**6**
(Sweden) M Tillström	3	2
(Spain) Ó Martínez	5	1
(Brazil) **F Meligeni**	**7^{7}**	**6**

Quarterfinals
(Belgium) **K Goossens**	**6**	**6**
7	(Germany) M-K Goellner	4	3
(Denmark) F Fetterlein	5	6^{4}
6	(Norway) **C Ruud**	**7**	**7^{7}**
5	(Spain) **C Costa**	**7**	**7**
(Spain) T Carbonell	5	5
Q	(Sweden) M Norman	4	3
(Brazil) **F Meligeni**	**6**	**6**

Semifinals
(Belgium) K Goossens	6^{5}	5
6	(Norway) **C Ruud**	**7^{7}**	**7**
5	(Spain) C Costa	**6**	0	2
(Brazil) **F Meligeni**	4	**6**	**6**

Final
6	(Norway) Christian Ruud	4	4
(Brazil) **Fernando Meligeni**	**6**	**6**
