= 2002 Abierto Mexicano Pegaso – Men's singles =

Men's singles
- 2002 Abierto Mexicano Pegaso

Final
- Champion: (Spain) Carlos Moyá
- Runner-up: (Brazil) Fernando Meligeni
- Score: 7–6^{(7–4)}, 7–6^{(7–4)}

Events
Singles	men	women
Doubles	men	women
← 2001 ·	Abierto Mexicano Pegaso	· 2003 →

Gustavo Kuerten was the defending champion but did not compete that year.

Carlos Moyá won in the final 7–6^{(7–4)}, 7–6^{(7–4)} against Fernando Meligeni.

== Seeds ==
1. (Germany) Tommy Haas (second round)
2. (Argentina) Guillermo Cañas (first round)
3. (Ecuador) Nicolás Lapentti (first round)
4. (Spain) Albert Portas (second round)
5. (Spain) Carlos Moyá (champion)
6. (Spain) Félix Mantilla (second round)
7. (France) Jérôme Golmard (first round)
8. (Argentina) David Nalbandian (first round)

== Draw ==
=== Key ===
- Q = Qualifier
- WC = Wild card
- LL = Lucky loser
- Alt = Alternate
- SE = Special exempt
- PR = Protected ranking
- ITF = ITF entry
- JE = Junior exempt
- w/o = Walkover
- r = Retired
- d = Defaulted
- SR = Special ranking

=== Finals ===
Semifinals
5	(Spain) Carlos Moyá	7^{7}	6
(Spain) Albert Montañés	6^{2}	4
(Brazil) Fernando Meligeni	6	6
(Argentina) Juan Ignacio Chela	2	4

Final
5	(Spain) Carlos Moyá	7^{7}	7^{7}
(Brazil) Fernando Meligeni	6^{4}	6^{4}

=== Top half ===
First round
WC/1	(Germany) T Haas	7^{7}	6
LL	(Brazil) F Saretta	6^{5}	2
(Spain) F Vicente	7^{7}	6
(Argentina) F Squillari	6^{3}	4
WC	(Spain) S Bruguera	3	3
(Argentina) J Acasuso	6	6
(Austria) M Hipfl	4	4
5	(Spain) C Moyá	6	6
3	(Ecuador) N Lapentti	6	6^{5}	0^{r}
(Argentina) M Zabaleta	4	7^{7}	3
(Sweden) M Norman	7^{7}	3	1
WC	(Mexico) A Hernández	6^{4}	6	2^{r}
Q	(United States) H Armando	4	6^{4}
(Spain) A Montañés	6	7^{7}
(Spain) G Blanco	6	3	0^{r}
6	(Spain) F Mantilla	2	6	0

Second round
WC/1	(Germany) T Haas	7	3	6^{7}
(Spain) F Vicente	5	6	7^{9}
(Argentina) J Acasuso	4	4
5	(Spain) C Moyá	6	6
(Argentina) M Zabaleta	7	6
(Sweden) M Norman	5	4
(Spain) A Montañés	6	6
6	(Spain) F Mantilla	4	4

Quarterfinals
(Spain) F Vicente	6^{4}	6	1
5	(Spain) C Moyá	7^{7}	3	6
(Argentina) M Zabaleta	4	6	3
(Spain) A Montañés	6	4	6

Semifinals
5	(Spain) C Moyá	7^{7}	6
(Spain) A Montañés	6^{2}	4

=== Bottom half ===
First round
8	(Argentina) D Nalbandian	5	1
Q	(France) N Coutelot	7	6
(Brazil) F Meligeni	6	7
Q	(United States) V Spadea	2	5
(United States) M Russell	1	6^{2}
(Spain) D Sánchez	6	7^{7}
Q	(Peru) L Horna	4	1
4	(Spain) A Portas	6	6
7	(France) J Golmard	6	1	4
(Spain) J Díaz	4	6	6
(Hungary) A Sávolt	1	4
(Spain) F Clavet	6	6
(Chile) N Massú	6	7^{7}
(Italy) A Gaudenzi	3	6^{3}
(Argentina) J I Chela	6	6
2	(Argentina) G Cañas	4	4

Second round
Q	(France) N Coutelot	6	4	3
(Brazil) F Meligeni	3	6	6
(Spain) D Sánchez	6	7
4	(Spain) A Portas	2	5
(Spain) J Díaz	0^{r}
(Spain) F Clavet	4
(Chile) N Massú	6	6^{10}	4
(Argentina) J I Chela	2	7^{12}	6

Quarterfinals
(Brazil) F Meligeni	6	7^{8}
(Spain) D Sánchez	4	6^{6}
(Spain) F Clavet	7^{8}	2	6^{5}
(Argentina) J I Chela	6^{6}	6	7^{7}

Semifinals
(Brazil) F Meligeni	6	6
(Argentina) J I Chela	2	4
