= 1996 Swedish Open – Doubles =

Doubles
- 1996 Swedish Open
- 1995 Champions: (Sweden) Jan Apell (Sweden) Jonas Björkman

Final
- Champions: (Sweden) David Ekerot (United States) Jeff Tarango
- Runners-up: (Australia) Joshua Eagle (Sweden) Peter Nyborg
- Score: 6–4, 3–6, 6–4

Details
- Draw: 16
- Seeds: 4

Events
Singles	Doubles
- Swedish Open

Jan Apell and Jonas Björkman were the defending champions but did not compete that year.

David Ekerot and Jeff Tarango won in the final 6–4, 3–6, 6–4 against Joshua Eagle and Peter Nyborg.

== Seeds ==
Champion seeds are indicated in bold text while text in italics indicates the round in which those seeds were eliminated.

1. (Spain) Tomás Carbonell / (Spain) Francisco Roig (semifinals)
2. (Australia) Joshua Eagle / (Sweden) Peter Nyborg (final)
3. (Sweden) **David Ekerot** / (United States) **Jeff Tarango (champions)**
4. (Sweden) Stefan Edberg / (Sweden) Anders Järryd (semifinals)

== Draw ==
Key

- Q = Qualifier
- WC = Wild card
- LL = Lucky loser
- Alt = Alternate
- ITF = ITF entry
- PR = Protected ranking
- SR = Special ranking
- SE = Special exempt
- JE = Junior exempt
- JR = Junior Accelerator Programme entrant
- CO = College Accelerator Programme entrant
- NG = Next Gen Accelerator Program entrant
- w/o = Walkover
- r = Retired
- d = Defaulted

First round
1	(Spain) **T Carbonell** (Spain) **F Roig**	**6**	**6**
(Sweden) T Johansson (Sweden) M Tillström	1	2
WC	(Germany) B Karbacher (Sweden) T Nydahl	6	4
(Germany) **M Huning** (Australia) **J Ireland**	**7**	**6**
3	(Sweden) **D Ekerot** (United States) **J Tarango**	**6**	**6**
Q	(Belgium) F Dewulf (Brazil) F Meligeni	2	4
(North Macedonia) A Kitinov (Hungary) G Köves	3	4
(United States) **B Hansen-Dent** (United States) **T.J. Middleton**	**6**	**6**
WC	(Sweden) **K Flygt** (Sweden) **P Fredriksson**	**6**	6	**6**
(Sweden) O Kristiansson (Sweden) M Renström	1	**7**	2
(Sweden) R Bergh (Sweden) L-A Wahlgren	**6**	5	3
4	(Sweden) **S Edberg** (Sweden) **A Järryd**	4	**7**	**6**
WC	(Sweden) M Larsson (Sweden) M Pernfors	**6**	6	2
(United States) **I Baron** (United States) **J Belloli**	4	**7**	**6**
(Spain) J A Conde (United States) J Waite	4	**6**	3
2	(Australia) **J Eagle** (Sweden) **P Nyborg**	**6**	3	**6**

Quarterfinals
1	(Spain) **T Carbonell** (Spain) **F Roig**	**6**	**6**
(Germany) M Huning (Australia) J Ireland	3	4
3	(Sweden) **D Ekerot** (United States) **J Tarango**	**6**	**6**
(United States) B Hansen-Dent (United States) T.J. Middleton	4	4
WC	(Sweden) K Flygt (Sweden) P Fredriksson	4	1
4	(Sweden) **S Edberg** (Sweden) **A Järryd**	**6**	**6**
(United States) I Baron (United States) J Belloli	**6**	5	3
2	(Australia) **J Eagle** (Sweden) **P Nyborg**	3	**7**	**6**

Semifinals
1	(Spain) T Carbonell (Spain) F Roig	3	**7**	4
3	(Sweden) **D Ekerot** (United States) **J Tarango**	**6**	5	**6**
4	(Sweden) S Edberg (Sweden) A Järryd	5	r
2	(Australia) **J Eagle** (Sweden) **P Nyborg**	**3**

Final
3	(Sweden) **David Ekerot** (United States) **Jeff Tarango**	**6**	3	**6**
2	(Australia) Joshua Eagle (Sweden) Peter Nyborg	4	**6**	4
