= Christian Ruud =

Norwegian tennis player

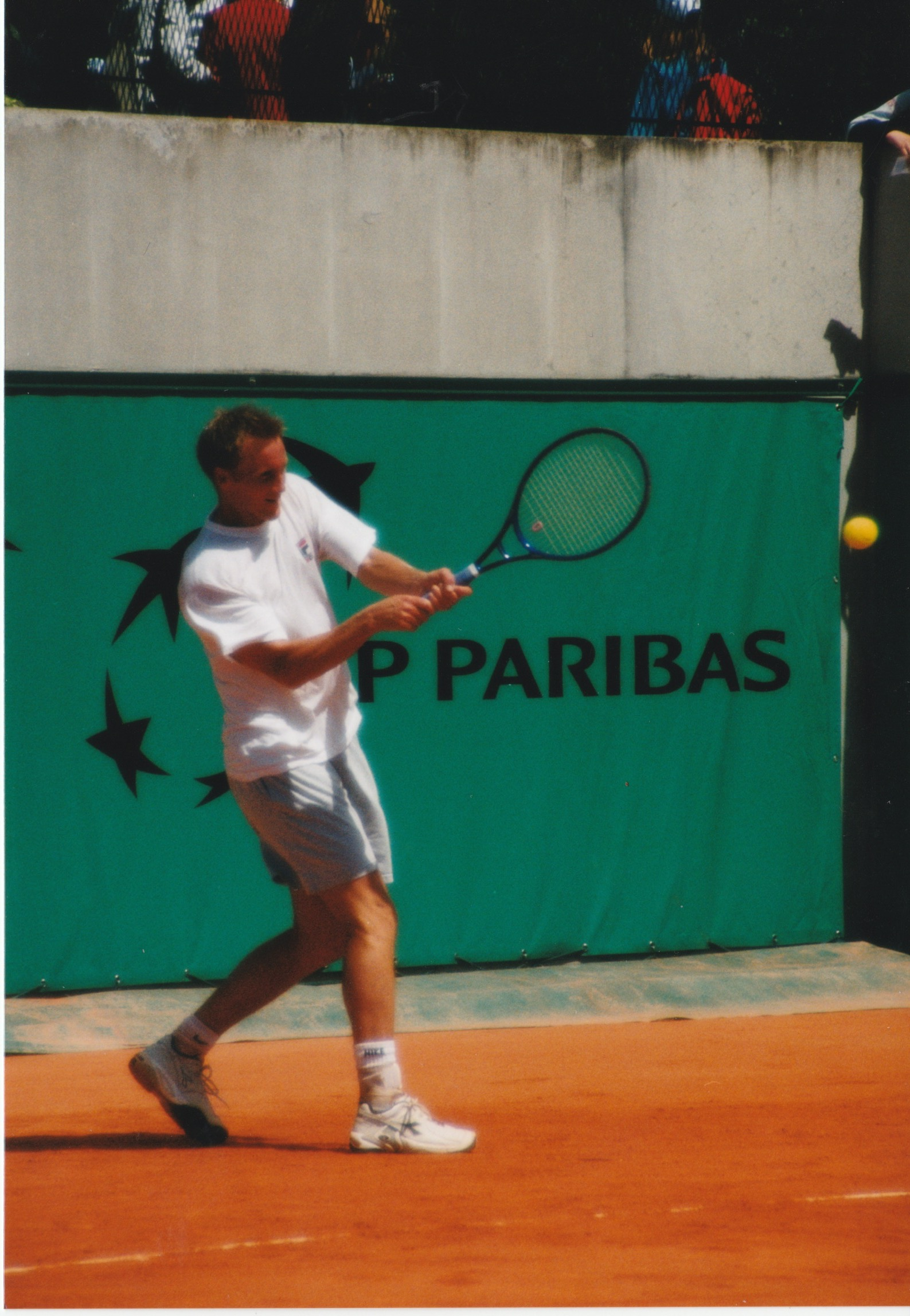
- Country (sports): Norway
- Residence: Oslo, Norway
- Born: 24 August 1972 (age 53) Oslo, Norway
- Height: 1.85 m (6 ft 1 in)
- Turned pro: 1991
- Retired: 2001
- Plays: Right-handed (two-handed backhand)
- Prize money: $1,399,813

Singles
- Career record: 115–145
- Career titles: 0
- Highest ranking: No. 39 (9 October 1995)

Grand Slam singles results
- Australian Open: 4R (1997)
- French Open: 3R (1995, 1999)
- Wimbledon: 1R (1995, 1996, 1997, 1999, 2000)
- US Open: 2R (1997, 1999)

Other tournaments
- Olympic Games: 3R (1996)

Doubles
- Career record: 5–10
- Career titles: 0
- Highest ranking: No. 264 (16 August 1993)

Christian Ruud (born 24 August 1972) is a Norwegian former tennis player who turned professional in 1991.

== Career ==
He achieved a career-high singles ranking of world No. 39 in October 1995, reaching the fourth round of the 1997 Australian Open and the quarterfinals of the 1997 Monte Carlo Masters. He retired in 2001 after the 2001 French Open. He was the highest-ranked Norwegian male player ever on the ATP Tour until his son Casper Ruud surpassed him in February 2020.

Ruud was born in Oslo and represented Norway at three consecutive Olympic Games, reaching the third round in Atlanta in 1996.

Ruud won twelve titles on the Challenger Series, but reached only one ATP Tour final, losing the 1995 Swedish Open in Båstad to Fernando Meligeni in straight sets.

== Personal life ==
Ruud is married to Lele Ruud.

He is the father of tennis player Casper Ruud, who has reached world No. 2 in singles, as well as daughters Caroline and Charlotte.

== Career titles ==
=== Singles (12) ===
Legend (singles)
Grand Slam (0)
Tennis Masters Cup (0)
ATP Masters Series (0)
ATP Tour (0)
Challengers (12)

No.	Date	Tournament	Surface	Opponent	Score
1.	1993	Tampere	Clay	(Belgium) Xavier Daufresne	6–4, 6–3
2.	1993	Montauban	Clay	(Morocco) Younes El Aynaoui	6–7, 6–4, 7–6
3.	1994	Ostend	Clay	(Belgium) Johan Van Herck	2–6, 6–4, 6–1
4.	1994	Lima	Clay	(Argentina) Hernán Gumy	3–6, 7–5, 6–3
5.	1994	Glendale	Hard	(United States) Michael Joyce	6–1, 6–3
6.	1994	Naples	Clay	(United States) Brian Dunn	6–1, 6–0
7.	1995	Fürth	Clay	(Sweden) Magnus Gustafsson	7–6, 6–4
8.	1996	Agadir	Clay	(Germany) Oliver Gross	2–6, 6–3, 7–5
9.	1998	Birmingham	Clay	(Belgium) Johan Van Herck	2–6, 6–1, 6–1
10.	1998	Fürth	Clay	(Norway) Jan Frode Andersen	6–4, 7–5
11.	1998	Poznań	Clay	(Argentina) Martín Rodríguez	1–6, 6–3, 6–3
12.	1998	Rancho Mirage	Hard	(United States) Cecil Mamiit	6–7, 6–3, 6–2

== Performance timeline ==
Key
W	F	SF	QF	#R	RR	Q#	DNQ	A	NH

(W) winner; (F) finalist; (SF) semifinalist; (QF) quarterfinalist; (#R) rounds 4, 3, 2, 1; (RR) round-robin stage; (Q#) qualification round; (DNQ) did not qualify; (A) absent; (NH) not held; (SR) strike rate (events won / competed); (W–L) win–loss record.

=== Singles ===
Tournament	1991	1992	1993	1994	1995	1996	1997	1998	1999	2000	2001	SR	W–L	Win%
Grand Slam tournaments
Australian Open	A	A	A	A	1R	2R	4R	1R	3R	A	A	0 / 5	6–5	55%
French Open	A	A	Q1	2R	3R	1R	1R	Q2	3R	1R	1R	0 / 7	5–7	42%
Wimbledon	A	A	Q1	A	1R	1R	1R	A	1R	1R	A	0 / 5	0–5	0%
US Open	A	1R	A	A	1R	1R	2R	1R	2R	1R	A	0 / 7	2–7	22%
Win–loss	0–0	0–1	0–0	1–1	2–3	0–4	2–4	3–2	3–4	2–4	0–1	0 / 24	13–24	35%
ATP World Tour Masters 1000
Indian Wells	A	A	A	A	A	A	1R	Q1	A	A	A	0 / 1	0–1	0%
Miami	A	A	A	A	1R	A	1R	A	2R	1R	A	0 / 4	1–4	20%
Monte Carlo	A	A	A	A	A	A	QF	A	A	3R	A	0 / 2	5–2	71%
Italian Open	A	A	A	A	A	1R	2R	A	A	1R	A	0 / 3	1–3	25%
Canadian Open	A	A	A	A	A	1R	A	A	A	A	A	0 / 1	0–1	0%
Win–loss	0–0	0–0	0–0	0–0	0–1	0–2	4–4	0–0	1–1	2–3	0–0	0 / 11	7–11	39%
