= 2014 Bucaramanga Open – Doubles =

Doubles
- 2014 Bucaramanga Open

Final
- Champions: (Colombia) Juan Sebastián Cabal (Colombia) Robert Farah
- Runners-up: (United States) Kevin King (Colombia) Juan-Carlos Spir
- Score: 7–6^{(7–3)}, 6–3

Events
Singles	Doubles
← 2013 ·	Bucaramanga Open	· 2015 →

Marcelo Demoliner and Franko Škugor were the defending champions, but lost in the quarterfinals to Kevin King and Juan-Carlos Spir.

Juan Sebastián Cabal and Robert Farah won the final 7–6^{(7–3)}, 6–3 against Kevin King and Juan-Carlos Spir.

== Seeds ==
1. (Colombia) Juan Sebastián Cabal / (Colombia) Robert Farah (champions)
2. (Brazil) Marcelo Demoliner / (Croatia) Franko Škugor (quarterfinals)
3. (Italy) Paolo Lorenzi / (Italy) Alessandro Motti (first round)
4. (Colombia) Nicolás Barrientos / (Colombia) Eduardo Struvay (semifinals)

== Draw ==
=== Key ===
- Q = Qualifier
- WC = Wild card
- LL = Lucky loser
- Alt = Alternate
- SE = Special exempt
- PR = Protected ranking
- ITF = ITF entry
- JE = Junior exempt
- w/o = Walkover
- r = Retired
- d = Defaulted
- SR = Special ranking

=== Draw ===
First round
1	(Colombia) JS Cabal (Colombia) R Farah	6^{9}	6	[10]
(Colombia) A Falla (Colombia) C Salamanca	7^{11}	2	[4]
(Argentina) R Olivo (Argentina) D Schwartzman	5	6	[10]
(Dominican Republic) V Estrella Burgos (Italy) R Ghedin	7	3	[8]
4	(Colombia) N Barrientos (Colombia) E Struvay	6	6
WC	(Ecuador) E Gómez (Ecuador) G Lapentti	1	1
WC	(Colombia) Felipe Mantilla (Colombia) Pedro Pablo Ruiz	3	1
(Argentina) F Argüello (Argentina) G Pella	6	6
(Argentina) M González (Spain) P Riba	7^{7}	6
(Argentina) M Alund (Peru) S Galdós	6^{3}	4
Alt	(El Salvador) M Arévalo (Venezuela) R Maytín	6	6^{7}	[10]
3	(Italy) P Lorenzi (Italy) A Motti	3	7^{9}	[4]
WC	(United States) K King (Colombia) JC Spir	4	6	[12]
(Argentina) G Andreozzi (Uruguay) A Behar	6	3	[10]
(Philippines) R Gonzales (United States) V Mirzadeh	6	2	[5]
2	(Brazil) M Demoliner (Croatia) F Škugor	3	6	[10]

Quarterfinals
1	(Colombia) JS Cabal (Colombia) R Farah	6	6
(Argentina) R Olivo (Argentina) D Schwartzman	2	3
4	(Colombia) N Barrientos (Colombia) E Struvay	6	6
(Argentina) F Argüello (Argentina) G Pella	2	0
(Argentina) M González (Spain) P Riba	7^{7}	6
Alt	(El Salvador) M Arévalo (Venezuela) R Maytín	6^{4}	3
WC	(United States) K King (Colombia) JC Spir	6	3	[10]
2	(Brazil) M Demoliner (Croatia) F Škugor	3	6	[7]

Semifinals
1	(Colombia) JS Cabal (Colombia) R Farah	6	6^{4}	[10]
4	(Colombia) N Barrientos (Colombia) E Struvay	4	7^{7}	[7]
(Argentina) M González (Spain) P Riba	6^{3}	6	[7]
WC	(United States) K King (Colombia) JC Spir	7^{7}	1	[10]

Final
1	(Colombia) JS Cabal (Colombia) R Farah	7^{7}	6
WC	(United States) K King (Colombia) JC Spir	6^{3}	3
