= 2009 Seguros Bolívar Open Bucaramanga – Singles =

Singles
- 2009 Seguros Bolívar Open Bucaramanga

Final
- Champion: (Argentina) Horacio Zeballos
- Runner-up: (Colombia) Carlos Salamanca
- Score: 7–5, 6–2

Events
Singles	Doubles
← 2008 ·	Seguros Bolívar Open Bucaramanga	· 2010 →

Horacio Zeballos won in the final of the first edition of these championships. He defeated Carlos Salamanca 7–5, 6–2.

== Seeds ==
1. (Argentina) ~~Diego Hartfield~~ (withdrew)
2. (Brazil) Ricardo Hocevar (first round)
3. (Argentina) Juan Pablo Brzezicki (second round)
4. (Argentina) Horacio Zeballos (champion)
5. (Spain) Miguel Ángel López Jaén (semifinals)
6. (Argentina) Mariano Puerta (second round)
7. (Brazil) João Souza (quarterfinals)
8. (Spain) Fernando Vicente (first round)

== Draw ==
=== Key ===
- Q = Qualifier
- WC = Wild card
- LL = Lucky loser
- Alt = Alternate
- SE = Special exempt
- PR = Protected ranking
- ITF = ITF entry
- JE = Junior exempt
- w/o = Walkover
- r = Retired
- d = Defaulted
- SR = Special ranking

=== Final four ===
Semifinals
WC	(Colombia) Carlos Salamanca	4	6	6
5	(Spain) Miguel Ángel López Jaén	6	3	4
4	(Argentina) Horacio Zeballos	7	6
Q	(Poland) Grzegorz Panfil	6^{3}	3

Final
WC	(Colombia) Carlos Salamanca	5	2
4	(Argentina) Horacio Zeballos	7	6

=== Top half ===
First round
LL	(Argentina) A Fabbri	3	2
(Venezuela) J de Armas	6	6
(Peru) I Miranda	4	4
(Dominican Republic) V Estrella	6	6
(Ecuador) C Avellán	4	6	3
(Brazil) D Silva	6	1	6
WC	(Colombia) C Salamanca	7	6
8	(Spain) F Vicente	6^{2}	4
3	(Argentina) JP Brzezicki	6	7
Q	(Brazil) Eric Gomes	4	5
(Italy) A di Mauro	4	7	7
(Romania) G Moraru	6	5	6^{6}
(Brazil) A Miele	4	2
(Republic of Ireland) C Niland	6	6
Q	(Italy) Enrico Burzi	4	2
5	(Spain) MÁ López Jaén	6	6

Second round
(Venezuela) J de Armas	3	4
(Dominican Republic) V Estrella	6	6
(Brazil) D Silva	3	2
WC	(Colombia) C Salamanca	6	6
3	(Argentina) JP Brzezicki	1	1	r
(Italy) A di Mauro	6	4
(Republic of Ireland) C Niland	2	5
5	(Spain) MÁ López Jaén	6	7

Quarterfinals
(Dominican Republic) V Estrella	3	2
WC	(Colombia) C Salamanca	6	6
(Italy) A di Mauro	5	4
5	(Spain) MÁ López Jaén	7	6

Semifinals
WC	(Colombia) C Salamanca	4	6	6
5	(Spain) MÁ López Jaén	6	3	4

=== Bottom half ===
First round
7	(Brazil) J Souza	6	6
SE	(Chile) G Hormazábal	4	4
(Colombia) JS Cabal	6	7
(Argentina) Juan Pablo Amado	4	6^{6}
(Argentina) D Álvarez	4	6	6^{5}
(Spain) C Poch-Gradin	6	4	7
Q	(Chile) J Aguilar	6^{2}	3
4	(Argentina) H Zeballos	7	6
6	(Argentina) M Puerta	4	6	7
(Brazil) R Dutra da Silva	6	4	5
WC	(Serbia) F Krajinović	6	6
(Brazil) C Zampieri	3	3
Q	(Poland) G Panfil	3	6	6
WC	(Colombia) Sat Galán	6	4	4
WC	(Colombia) M Quintero	6	7
2	(Brazil) R Hocevar	4	6^{0}

Second round
7	(Brazil) J Souza	6	6
(Colombia) JS Cabal	4	4
(Spain) C Poch-Gradin	2	4
4	(Argentina) H Zeballos	6	6
6	(Argentina) M Puerta	4	5
WC	(Serbia) F Krajinović	6	7
Q	(Poland) G Panfil	4	6	7
WC	(Colombia) M Quintero	6	4	6^{4}

Quarterfinals
7	(Brazil) J Souza	6^{6}	6^{5}
4	(Argentina) H Zeballos	7	7
WC	(Serbia) F Krajinović	6	4	6^{4}
Q	(Poland) G Panfil	4	6	7

Semifinals
4	(Argentina) H Zeballos	7	6
Q	(Poland) G Panfil	6^{3}	3

== Sources ==
- Main draw
