= 2011 Seguros Bolívar Open Bucaramanga – Singles =

Singles
- 2011 Seguros Bolívar Open Bucaramanga

Final
- Champion: (France) Éric Prodon
- Runner-up: (Brazil) Fernando Romboli
- Score: 6–3, 4–6, 6–1

Events
Singles	Doubles
← 2010 ·	Seguros Bolívar Open Bucaramanga	· 2012 →

Eduardo Schwank was the defending champion, but decided to not play this year.
5th seed Éric Prodon defeated qualifier Fernando Romboli 6–3, 4–6, 6–1 in the final.

== Seeds ==
1. (Colombia) Alejandro Falla (second round)
2. (Argentina) Horacio Zeballos (second round)
3. (Brazil) João Souza (quarterfinals)
4. (Spain) Albert Ramos Viñolas (first round)
5. (France) Éric Prodon (champion)
6. (Argentina) Federico Delbonis (second round)
7. (Spain) Daniel Muñoz de la Nava (first round)
8. (Argentina) Diego Junqueira (second round)

== Draw ==
=== Key ===
- Q = Qualifier
- WC = Wild card
- LL = Lucky loser
- Alt = Alternate
- SE = Special exempt
- PR = Protected ranking
- ITF = ITF entry
- JE = Junior exempt
- w/o = Walkover
- r = Retired
- d = Defaulted
- SR = Special ranking

=== Finals ===
Semifinals
Q	(Brazil) Fernando Romboli	6	6
(Argentina) José Acasuso	1	2
5	(France) Éric Prodon	6	6
(Morocco) Reda El Amrani	2	4

Final
Q	(Brazil) Fernando Romboli	3	6	1
5	(France) Éric Prodon	6	4	6

=== Top half ===
First round
1/WC	(Colombia) A Falla	6^{5}	6	6
WC	(Colombia) Eduardo Struvay	7	2	2
(Ecuador) G Lapentti	1	6	6
(Portugal) L Tavares	6	4	3
(Colombia) C Salamanca	6	2^{r}
Q	(Brazil) F Romboli	4	5
WC	(Colombia) Sebastián Serrano	2	0
8	(Argentina) D Junqueira	6	6
4	(Spain) A Ramos Viñolas	0	1
(Argentina) J Acasuso	6	6
(Brazil) R Dutra da Silva	6	6
Q	(Argentina) P Galdón	1	2
WC	(Portugal) G Elias	6	6
(Colombia) JS Cabal	3	3
(Colombia) R Farah	6^{2}	4
6	(Argentina) F del Bonis	7	6

Second round
1/WC	(Colombia) A Falla	4	1
(Ecuador) G Lapentti	6	6
Q	(Brazil) F Romboli	4	6	7
8	(Argentina) D Junqueira	6	4	6^{5}
(Argentina) J Acasuso	6	6
(Brazil) R Dutra da Silva	2	4
WC	(Portugal) G Elias	6	3	6
6	(Argentina) F del Bonis	4	6	0

Quarterfinals
(Ecuador) G Lapentti	3	4
Q	(Brazil) F Romboli	6	6
(Argentina) J Acasuso	6	6
WC	(Portugal) G Elias	3	1

Semifinals
Q	(Brazil) F Romboli	6	6
(Argentina) J Acasuso	1	2

=== Bottom half ===
First round
5	(France) É Prodon	6	6
(Brazil) C Zampieri	3	3
(Chile) P Capdeville	7	3	4
Q	(Ecuador) JC Campozano	6^{4}	6	6
(Chile) J Aguilar	6	6
(Dominican Republic) V Estrella	4	4
(Argentina) S Decoud	1	6^{5}
3	(Brazil) J Souza	6	7
7	(Spain) D Muñoz de la Nava	6	3	4
(Argentina) A Molteni	4	6	6
(Brazil) R Hocevar	0	7	7
(Argentina) JP Brzezicki	6	6^{5}	6^{2}
Q	(Ecuador) I Endara	4	4
(Morocco) R El Amrani	6	6
(Spain) I Navarro	6^{5}	5
2	(Argentina) H Zeballos	7	7

Second round
5	(France) É Prodon	4	6	6
Q	(Ecuador) JC Campozano	6	3	4
(Chile) J Aguilar	5	2
3	(Brazil) J Souza	7	6
(Argentina) A Molteni	6	6
(Brazil) R Hocevar	1	4
(Morocco) R El Amrani	6	3	6
2	(Argentina) H Zeballos	4	6	4

Quarterfinals
5	(France) É Prodon	4	6	6
3	(Brazil) J Souza	6	3	3
(Argentina) A Molteni	6	3	4
(Morocco) R El Amrani	3	6	6

Semifinals
5	(France) É Prodon	6	6
(Morocco) R El Amrani	2	4
