= 2013 Seguros Bolívar Open Bucaramanga =

- Date: 21–27 January
- Edition: 5th
- Draw: 32S / 16D
- Prize money: $35,000+H
- Surface: Clay
- Location: Bucaramanga, Colombia

Champions

Singles
- (Argentina) Federico Delbonis

Doubles
- (Brazil) Marcelo Demoliner / (Croatia) Franko Škugor
← 2012 ·	Seguros Bolívar Open Bucaramanga	· 2014 →

The 2013 Seguros Bolívar Open Bucaramanga was a professional tennis tournament played on hard courts. It was the fifth edition of the tournament which was part of the 2013 ATP Challenger Tour. It took place in Bucaramanga, Colombia between 23 and 29 January 2013.

== Singles main draw entrants ==
=== Seeds ===
Country	Player	Rank^{1}	Seed
COL	Santiago Giraldo	64	1
BRA	Rogério Dutra da Silva	111	2
ARG	Martín Alund	115	3
BRA	João Souza	131	4
POR	Gastão Elias	141	5
ARG	Federico Delbonis	142	6
USA	Wayne Odesnik	144	7
CHI	Paul Capdeville	166	8

- ^{1} Rankings are as of January 14, 2013.

=== Other entrants ===
The following players received wildcards into the singles main draw:

- (Colombia) Santiago Giraldo
- (Chile) Nicolás Massú
- (Colombia) Álvaro Ochoa
- (Colombia) Eduardo Struvay

The following players received entry from the qualifying draw:

- (Moldova) Roman Borvanov
- (Uruguay) Marcel Felder
- (Argentina) Patricio Heras
- (Croatia) Franko Škugor

== Doubles main draw entrants ==
=== Seeds ===
Country	Player	Country	Player	Rank^{1}	Seed
BRA	Rogério Dutra da Silva	BRA	João Souza	227	1
BRA	Marcelo Demoliner	CRO	Franko Škugor	331	2
ARG	Facundo Bagnis	ARG	Federico Delbonis	354	3
BRA	Fabiano de Paula	BRA	André Ghem	374	4

- ^{1} Rankings are as of January 14, 2013.

=== Other entrants ===
The following pairs received wildcards into the doubles main draw:

- (United States) Sam Barnett / (United States) Kevin Kim
- (Colombia) Nicolás Barrientos / (Colombia) Eduardo Struvay
- (Brazil) Ricardo Hocevar / (Chile) Nicolás Massú

== Champions ==
=== Singles ===
- (Argentina) Federico Delbonis def. (United States) Wayne Odesnik, 7–6^{(7–4)}, 6–3

=== Doubles ===
- (Brazil) Marcelo Demoliner / (Croatia) Franko Škugor def. (Peru) Sergio Galdós / (Argentina) Marco Trungelliti, 7–6^{(10–8)}, 6–2
