= 2014 Bucaramanga Open – Singles =

Singles
- 2014 Bucaramanga Open

Final
- Champion: (Colombia) Alejandro Falla
- Runner-up: (Italy) Paolo Lorenzi
- Score: 7–5, 6–1

Events
Singles	Doubles
← 2013 ·	Bucaramanga Open	· 2015 →

Federico Delbonis was the defending champion but chose not to compete.

Alejandro Falla won the final against Italian Paolo Lorenzi with partial 7–5, 6–1, and in which it becomes the first Colombian to win this tournament, Carlos Salamanca was as yet the only Colombian to reach the final losing in 2009.

== Seeds ==
1. (Colombia) Alejandro González (semifinals)
2. (Colombia) Alejandro Falla (champion)
3. (Argentina) Guido Pella (second round)
4. (Italy) Paolo Lorenzi (final)
5. (Brazil) João Souza (first round)
6. (Argentina) Diego Schwartzman (semifinals)
7. (Argentina) Facundo Argüello (quarterfinals)
8. (Spain) Pere Riba (quarterfinals)

== Draw ==
=== Key ===
- Q = Qualifier
- WC = Wild card
- LL = Lucky loser
- Alt = Alternate
- SE = Special exempt
- PR = Protected ranking
- ITF = ITF entry
- JE = Junior exempt
- w/o = Walkover
- r = Retired
- d = Defaulted
- SR = Special ranking

=== Finals ===
Semifinals
1	(Colombia) Alejandro González	4	2
4	(Italy) Paolo Lorenzi	6	6
6	(Argentina) D Schwartzman	5	1
2	(Colombia) Alejandro Falla	7	6

Final
4	(Italy) Paolo Lorenzi	5	1
2	(Colombia) Alejandro Falla	7	6

=== Top half ===
First round
1	(Colombia) A González	7	6
(Colombia) C Salamanca	5	0
(Dominican Republic) V Estrella Burgos	4	3
(Portugal) G Elias	6	6
(Ecuador) E Gómez	4	6	6
(Venezuela) D Souto	6	3	4
(Brazil) A Ghem	3	7^{7}	6
5	(Brazil) J Souza	6	6^{4}	4
4	(Italy) P Lorenzi	6	3	6
(Argentina) M González	2	6	1
(Argentina) M Alund	6	2	6
(Austria) G Melzer	2	6	3
WC	(Colombia) JC Spir	6	6
WC	(Colombia) Felipe Mantilla	1	2
Q	(Bolivia) H Dellien	2	3
7	(Argentina) F Argüello	6	6

Second round
1	(Colombia) A González	7^{7}	6
(Portugal) G Elias	6^{3}	3
(Ecuador) E Gómez	1	3
(Brazil) A Ghem	6	6
4	(Italy) P Lorenzi	3	6	6
(Argentina) M Alund	6	3	3
WC	(Colombia) JC Spir	3	3
7	(Argentina) F Argüello	6	6

Quarterfinals
1	(Colombia) A González	6	7^{7}
(Brazil) A Ghem	3	6^{2}
4	(Italy) P Lorenzi	6	6
7	(Argentina) F Argüello	1	2

Semifinals
1	(Colombia) A González	4	2
4	(Italy) P Lorenzi	6	6

=== Bottom half ===
First round
6	(Argentina) D Schwartzman	6	3	6
Q	(Chile) C Garin	4	6	3
WC	(Colombia) N Barrientos	7	2	7
PR	(Ecuador) G Lapentti	5	6	5
(Argentina) G Andreozzi	6	6
Q	(Colombia) E Struvay	2	2
(Brazil) G Clezar	7^{8}	0	0^{r}
3	(Argentina) G Pella	6^{6}	6	2
8/WC	(Spain) P Riba	6	7^{9}
Q	(Guatemala) C Díaz Figueroa	3	6^{7}
(Dominican Republic) J Hernández	6^{4}	6	6
(Spain) J Lizarturry	7^{7}	4	5^{r}
(Argentina) R Olivo	3	3
(Chile) G Lama	6	6
(United States) C Buchanan	5	2
2	(Colombia) A Falla	7	6

Second round
6	(Argentina) D Schwartzman	1	7^{7}	6
WC	(Colombia) N Barrientos	6	6^{5}	3
(Argentina) G Andreozzi	2	6	6
3	(Argentina) G Pella	6	3	4
8/WC	(Spain) P Riba	6	1	6
(Dominican Republic) J Hernández	2	6	3
(Chile) G Lama	6	3	5
2	(Colombia) A Falla	3	6	7

Quarterfinals
6	(Argentina) D Schwartzman	6^{2}	6	6
(Argentina) G Andreozzi	7^{7}	4	0
8/WC	(Spain) P Riba	3	6^{4}
2	(Colombia) A Falla	6	7^{7}

Semifinals
6	(Argentina) D Schwartzman	5	1
2	(Colombia) A Falla	7	6
