= 2016 Claro Open Bucaramanga – Doubles =

Doubles
- 2016 Claro Open Bucaramanga

Final
- Champions: (Chile) Julio Peralta (Argentina) Horacio Zeballos
- Runners-up: (Peru) Sergio Galdós (Venezuela) Luis David Martínez
- Score: 6–2, 6–2

Events
Singles	Doubles
← 2015 ·	Claro Open Bucaramanga	· 2017 →

Guillermo Durán and Andrés Molteni are the defending champions, but only Molteni defended his title partnering José Hernández.

Julio Peralta and Horacio Zeballos won the title, defeating Sergio Galdós and Luis David Martínez 6–2, 6–2 in the final.

== Seeds ==
1. (Chile) Julio Peralta / (Argentina) Horacio Zeballos (champions)
2. (Venezuela) Roberto Maytín / (Mexico) Miguel Ángel Reyes-Varela (first round)
3. (Dominican Republic) José Hernández / (Argentina) Andrés Molteni (first round)
4. (Peru) Sergio Galdós / (Venezuela) Luis David Martínez (final)

== Draw ==
=== Key ===
- Q = Qualifier
- WC = Wild card
- LL = Lucky loser
- Alt = Alternate
- SE = Special exempt
- PR = Protected ranking
- ITF = ITF entry
- JE = Junior exempt
- w/o = Walkover
- r = Retired
- d = Defaulted
- SR = Special ranking

First round
1	(Chile) J Peralta (Argentina) H Zeballos	7^{7}	5	[10]
(Brazil) G Clezar (Portugal) G Elias	6^{3}	7	[8]
(Argentina) P Cachin (Argentina) N Kicker	6	6
(Belgium) A De Greef (Argentina) F Mena	2	0
3	(Dominican Republic) J Hernández (Argentina) A Molteni	6	6^{4}	[11]
(Argentina) G Andreozzi (Uruguay) A Behar	3	7^{7}	[13]
(Argentina) F Argüello (Argentina) A Collarini	7	1	[14]
WC	(Colombia) N Barrientos (Colombia) A Gómez	5	6	[12]
(France) M Bourgue (France) C Hemery	6	6
WC	(Argentina) Gregorio Cordonnier (Colombia) Felipe Mantilla	3	2
WC	(Chile) N Jarry (Colombia) C Salamanca	6	4	[9]
4	(Peru) S Galdós (Venezuela) LD Martínez	3	6	[11]
(El Salvador) M Arévalo (Spain) P Riba	6	6^{2}	[3]
(Brazil) R Dutra Silva (Argentina) JI Londero	4	7^{7}	[10]
(Colombia) A Falla (Ecuador) G Lapentti	6	6
2	(Venezuela) R Maytín (Mexico) MÁ Reyes-Varela	4	4

Quarterfinals
1	(Chile) J Peralta (Argentina) H Zeballos	6^{4}	6	[11]
(Argentina) P Cachin (Argentina) N Kicker	7^{7}	3	[9]
(Argentina) G Andreozzi (Uruguay) A Behar	6	6
(Argentina) F Argüello (Argentina) A Collarini	1	3
(France) M Bourgue (France) C Hemery	3	6	[5]
4	(Peru) S Galdós (Venezuela) LD Martínez	6	3	[10]
(Brazil) R Dutra Silva (Argentina) JI Londero	w/o
(Colombia) A Falla (Ecuador) G Lapentti

Semifinals
1	(Chile) J Peralta (Argentina) H Zeballos	6	4	[10]
(Argentina) G Andreozzi (Uruguay) A Behar	1	6	[6]
4	(Peru) S Galdós (Venezuela) LD Martínez	6	6
(Brazil) R Dutra Silva (Argentina) JI Londero	4	3

Final
1	(Chile) J Peralta (Argentina) H Zeballos	6	6
4	(Peru) S Galdós (Venezuela) LD Martínez	2	2
