= 2016 Claro Open Bucaramanga – Singles =

Singles
- 2016 Claro Open Bucaramanga

Final
- Champion: (Austria) Gerald Melzer
- Runner-up: (Italy) Paolo Lorenzi
- Score: 6–3, 6–1

Events
Singles	Doubles
← 2015 ·	Claro Open Bucaramanga	· 2017 →

Daniel Gimeno Traver is the defending champion, but chose not to defend his title. Gerald Melzer won the title defeating Paolo Lorenzi in the final 6–3, 6–1.

== Seeds ==
1. (Dominican Republic) Víctor Estrella Burgos (quarterfinals)
2. (Italy) Paolo Lorenzi (final)
3. (Argentina) Facundo Bagnis (first round)
4. (Spain) Albert Montañés (first round)
5. (Brazil) Rogério Dutra Silva (first round)
6. (Colombia) Alejandro Falla (first round)
7. (Argentina) Horacio Zeballos (semifinals)
8. (Portugal) Gastão Elias (quarterfinals)

== Draw ==
=== Key ===
- Q = Qualifier
- WC = Wild card
- LL = Lucky loser
- Alt = Alternate
- SE = Special exempt
- PR = Protected ranking
- ITF = ITF entry
- JE = Junior exempt
- w/o = Walkover
- r = Retired
- d = Defaulted
- SR = Special ranking

=== Finals ===
Semifinals
(France) Mathias Bourgue	4	6^{6}
(Austria) Gerald Melzer	6	7^{8}
7	(Argentina) Horacio Zeballos	3	7	3
2	(Italy) Paolo Lorenzi	6	5	6

Final
(Austria) Gerald Melzer	6	6
2	(Italy) Paolo Lorenzi	3	1

=== Top half ===
First round
1	(Dominican Republic) V Estrella Burgos	7^{7}	6
Alt	(Belgium) A De Greef	6^{5}	3
Q	(Colombia) DE Galán	2	3
Q	(Dominican Republic) J Hernández	6	6
(Spain) P Riba	4	3
(France) M Bourgue	6	6
(Argentina) P Cachin	7^{7}	6
6/WC	(Colombia) A Falla	6^{0}	3
4	(Spain) A Montañés	7^{7}	4	4
(Austria) B Trinker	6^{3}	6	6
WC	(Colombia) E Struvay	3	7	6
(Colombia) A González	6	5	3
(Austria) G Melzer	3	7	6
Q	(Argentina) Maximiliano Estévez	6	5	1
(Chile) H Podlipnik Castillo	6	6
5	(Brazil) R Dutra Silva	4	4

Second round
1	(Dominican Republic) V Estrella Burgos	6	4	7
Q	(Dominican Republic) J Hernández	3	6	5
(France) M Bourgue	6	6
(Argentina) P Cachin	4	3
(Austria) B Trinker	4	1
WC	(Colombia) E Struvay	6	6
(Austria) G Melzer	6	3	6
(Chile) H Podlipnik Castillo	4	6	2

Quarterfinals
1	(Dominican Republic) V Estrella Burgos	1	6^{5}
(France) M Bourgue	6	7^{7}
WC	(Colombia) E Struvay	4	6^{5}
(Austria) G Melzer	6	7^{7}

Semifinals
(France) M Bourgue	4	6^{6}
(Austria) G Melzer	6	7^{8}

=== Bottom half ===
First round
7	(Argentina) H Zeballos	7^{7}	7
Q	(Chile) N Jarry	6^{1}	5
(Argentina) F Argüello	7	1
WC	(Colombia) N Barrientos	5	0^{r}
(Spain) J Samper Montaña	6	6
WC	(United States) T Paul	3	3
WC	(Argentina) N Kicker	6	4	7^{10}
3	(Argentina) F Bagnis	3	6	6^{8}
8	(Portugal) G Elias	6	6
(Sweden) C Lindell	4	1
(Ecuador) G Lapentti	2	5
(Brazil) G Clezar	6	7
Alt	(Argentina) G Andreozzi	6	6
(France) C Hemery	3	2
(Slovakia) A Martin	3	6	3
2	(Italy) P Lorenzi	6	2	6

Second round
7	(Argentina) H Zeballos	6	3	6
(Argentina) F Argüello	3	6	4
(Spain) J Samper Montaña	6^{2}	7	6
WC	(Argentina) N Kicker	7^{7}	5	4
8	(Portugal) G Elias	2	6	6
(Brazil) G Clezar	6	4	4
Alt	(Argentina) G Andreozzi	1	2
2	(Italy) P Lorenzi	6	6

Quarterfinals
7	(Argentina) H Zeballos	6	7^{7}
(Spain) J Samper Montaña	3	6^{4}
8	(Portugal) G Elias	4	6	6^{6}
2	(Italy) P Lorenzi	6	3	7^{8}

Semifinals
7	(Argentina) H Zeballos	3	7	3
2	(Italy) P Lorenzi	6	5	6
