= 2012 Seguros Bolívar Open Bucaramanga – Doubles =

Doubles
- 2012 Seguros Bolívar Open Bucaramanga

Final
- Champions: (Uruguay) Ariel Behar (Argentina) Horacio Zeballos
- Runners-up: (Spain) Miguel Ángel López Jaén (Italy) Paolo Lorenzi
- Score: 6–4, 7–6^{(7–5)}

Events
Singles	Doubles
← 2011 ·	Seguros Bolívar Open Bucaramanga	· 2013 →

Juan Sebastián Cabal and Robert Farah were the defending champions but decided not to participate.

Ariel Behar and Horacio Zeballos won the title, defeating Miguel Ángel López Jaén and Paolo Lorenzi in the final 6–4, 7–6^{(7–5)}.

== Seeds ==
1. (Brazil) Fernando Romboli / (Brazil) Júlio Silva (semifinals)
2. (Argentina) Martín Alund / (Argentina) Andrés Molteni (first round)
3. (Dominican Republic) Víctor Estrella / (Uruguay) Marcel Felder (quarterfinals)
4. (Spain) Miguel Ángel López Jaén / (Italy) Paolo Lorenzi (final)

== Draw ==
=== Key ===
- Q = Qualifier
- WC = Wild card
- LL = Lucky loser
- Alt = Alternate
- SE = Special exempt
- PR = Protected ranking
- ITF = ITF entry
- JE = Junior exempt
- w/o = Walkover
- r = Retired
- d = Defaulted
- SR = Special ranking

=== Draw ===
First round
1	(Brazil) F Romboli (Brazil) J Silva	6	6
(Peru) M Echazú (France) J Eysseric	4	3
(Colombia) C Salamanca (Colombia) E Struvay	6	3	[8]
(Brazil) R Hocevar (Brazil) Tiago Lopes	4	6	[10]
4	(Spain) MÁ López Jaén (Italy) P Lorenzi	7	6
WC	(Colombia) A González (Colombia) M Quintero	5	2
WC	(Chile) P Capdeville (Chile) M Sborowitz	4	6	[10]
(Colombia) JS Gómez (United States) W Odesnik	6	4	[8]
(Peru) D Beretta (Peru) S Galdós	5	6	[8]
(Brazil) G Clézar (Brazil) A Ghem	7	2	[10]
WC	(Colombia) N Barrientos (Colombia) Sebastian Serrano	2	4
3	(Dominican Republic) V Estrella (Uruguay) M Felder	6	6
(Uruguay) A Behar (Argentina) H Zeballos	6	7^{8}
(Brazil) T Alves (Ecuador) I Endara	4	6^{6}
(Argentina) Guillermo Durán (Argentina) M Trungelliti	6	6
2	(Argentina) M Alund (Argentina) A Molteni	3	4

Quarterfinals
1	(Brazil) F Romboli (Brazil) J Silva	w/o
(Brazil) R Hocevar (Brazil) Tiago Lopes
4	(Spain) MÁ López Jaén (Italy) P Lorenzi	w/o
WC	(Chile) P Capdeville (Chile) M Sborowitz
(Brazil) G Clézar (Brazil) A Ghem	7	6
3	(Dominican Republic) V Estrella (Uruguay) M Felder	5	3
(Uruguay) A Behar (Argentina) H Zeballos	6	3	[10]
(Argentina) Guillermo Durán (Argentina) M Trungelliti	1	6	[8]

Semifinals
1	(Brazil) F Romboli (Brazil) J Silva	3	3
4	(Spain) MÁ López Jaén (Italy) P Lorenzi	6	6
(Brazil) G Clézar (Brazil) A Ghem	0	3
(Uruguay) A Behar (Argentina) H Zeballos	6	6

Final
4	(Spain) MÁ López Jaén (Italy) P Lorenzi	4	6^{5}
(Uruguay) A Behar (Argentina) H Zeballos	6	7^{7}
