= 2011 Seguros Bolívar Open Bucaramanga – Doubles =

Doubles
- 2011 Seguros Bolívar Open Bucaramanga

Final
- Champions: (Colombia) Juan Sebastián Cabal (Colombia) Robert Farah
- Runners-up: (Argentina) Pablo Galdón (Argentina) Andrés Molteni
- Score: 6–1, 6–2

Events
Singles	Doubles
← 2010 ·	Seguros Bolívar Open Bucaramanga	· 2012 →

Pere Riba and Santiago Ventura chose not to defend their 2009 title.
Juan Sebastián Cabal and Robert Farah won the final against Pablo Galdón and Andrés Molteni 6–1, 6–2.

== Seeds ==
1. (Spain) Daniel Muñoz-de la Nava / (Portugal) Leonardo Tavares (second round, withdrew)
2. (Colombia) Juan Sebastián Cabal / (Colombia) Robert Farah (champions)
3. (Chile) Jorge Aguilar / (Mexico) Daniel Garza (second round)
4. (Argentina) Federico del Bonis / (Argentina) Diego Junqueira (second round)

== Draw ==
=== Key ===
- Q = Qualifier
- WC = Wild card
- LL = Lucky loser
- Alt = Alternate
- SE = Special exempt
- PR = Protected ranking
- ITF = ITF entry
- JE = Junior exempt
- w/o = Walkover
- r = Retired
- d = Defaulted
- SR = Special ranking

=== Draw ===
First round
1	(Spain) D Muñoz-de la Nava (Portugal) L Tavares	6	6
(Ecuador) JC Campozano (Ecuador) G Lapentti	4	1
(Argentina) P Galdón (Argentina) A Molteni	6	3	[10]
WC	(Colombia) JS Gómez (Colombia) E Struvay	3	6	[5]
3	(Chile) J Aguilar (Mexico) D Garza
(Argentina) JP Brzezicki (Brazil) C Zampieri
(Brazil) R Hocevar (Brazil) F Romboli	4	4
(Brazil) D Dutra da Silva (Brazil) R Dutra da Silva	6	6
(Morocco) R El Amrani (Tunisia) M Jaziri	5	6
(Argentina) S Decoud (Colombia) C Salamanca	7	2	r
(Colombia) A Falla (Colombia) A González	5	2
4	(Argentina) F del Bonis (Argentina) D Junqueira	7	6
WC	(Colombia) Sebastián López (Colombia) Sebastián Serrano	7	2	[7]
WC	(Portugal) G Elias (Dominican Republic) V Estrella	6^{5}	6	[10]
(Spain) I Navarro (Spain) A Ramos-Viñolas	3	0
2	(Colombia) JS Cabal (Colombia) R Farah	6	6

Quarterfinals
1	(Spain) D Muñoz-de la Nava (Portugal) L Tavares	w/o
(Argentina) P Galdón (Argentina) A Molteni
3	(Chile) J Aguilar (Mexico) D Garza	1	6	[3]
(Brazil) D Dutra da Silva (Brazil) R Dutra da Silva	6	3	[10]
(Morocco) R El Amrani (Tunisia) M Jaziri	6	7
4	(Argentina) F del Bonis (Argentina) D Junqueira	4	6^{1}
WC	(Portugal) G Elias (Dominican Republic) V Estrella	1	2
2	(Colombia) JS Cabal (Colombia) R Farah	6	6

Semifinals
(Argentina) P Galdón (Argentina) A Molteni	6	6
(Brazil) D Dutra da Silva (Brazil) R Dutra da Silva	1	2
(Morocco) R El Amrani (Tunisia) M Jaziri	1	1
2	(Colombia) JS Cabal (Colombia) R Farah	6	6

Final
(Argentina) P Galdón (Argentina) A Molteni	1	2
2	(Colombia) JS Cabal (Colombia) R Farah	6	6
