= 2011 Seguros Bolívar Open Bucaramanga =

- Date: 24–30 January
- Edition: 3rd
- Location: Bucaramanga, Colombia

Champions

Singles
- (France) Éric Prodon

Doubles
- (Colombia) Juan Sebastián Cabal / (Colombia) Robert Farah
| ← 2010 · | Seguros Bolívar Open Bucaramanga | · 2012 → |

The 2011 Seguros Bolívar Open Bucaramanga was a professional tennis tournament played on hard courts. It was the third edition of the tournament which was part of the 2011 ATP Challenger Tour. It took place in Bucaramanga, Colombia between 24 and 30 January 2011.

== ATP entrants ==
=== Seeds ===
| Country | Player | Rank^{1} | Seed |
|---|---|---|---|
| COL | Alejandro Falla | 103 | 1 |
| ARG | Horacio Zeballos | 106 | 2 |
| BRA | João Souza | 115 | 3 |
| ESP | Albert Ramos Viñolas | 126 | 4 |
| FRA | Éric Prodon | 139 | 5 |
| ARG | Federico Delbonis | 142 | 6 |
| ESP | Daniel Muñoz de la Nava | 144 | 7 |
| ARG | Diego Junqueira | 146 | 8 |

- Rankings are as of January 17, 2011.

=== Other entrants ===
The following players received wildcards into the singles main draw:

- (Portugal) Gastão Elias
- (Colombia) Alejandro Falla
- (Colombia) Sebastian Serrano
- (Colombia) Eduardo Struvay

The following players received entry from the qualifying draw:

- (Ecuador) Júlio César Campozano
- (Ecuador) Iván Endara
- (Argentina) Pablo Galdón
- (Brazil) Fernando Romboli

== Champions ==
=== Singles ===
(France) Éric Prodon def. (Brazil) Fernando Romboli, 6–3, 4–6, 6–1

=== Doubles ===
(Colombia) Juan Sebastián Cabal / (Colombia) Robert Farah def. (Argentina) Pablo Galdón / (Argentina) Andrés Molteni, 6–1, 6–2
