= 2009 Seguros Bolívar Open Bucaramanga =

- Date: January 26 – February 1
- Edition: 1st
- Location: Bucaramanga, Colombia

Champions

Singles
- (Argentina) Horacio Zeballos

Doubles
- (Argentina) Diego Álvarez / (Spain) Carles Poch-Gradin
Seguros Bolívar Open Bucaramanga	· 2010 →

The 2009 Seguros Bolívar Open Bucaramanga was a professional tennis tournament played on outdoor red clay courts. It was part of the 2009 ATP Challenger Tour. It took place in Bucaramanga, Colombia between 26 January and 1 February 2009.

== Singles main draw entrants ==
=== Seeds ===
Country	Player	Rank^{1}	Seed
ARG	~~Diego Hartfield~~	167	1
BRA	Ricardo Hocevar	168	2
ARG	Juan Pablo Brzezicki	176	3
ARG	Horacio Zeballos	181	4
ESP	Miguel Ángel López Jaén	190	5
ARG	Mariano Puerta	194	6
BRA	João Souza	200	7
ESP	Fernando Vicente	205	8

- Rankings are as of January 19, 2009

=== Other entrants ===
The following players received wildcards into the singles main draw:

- (Colombia) Sat Galán
- (Serbia) Filip Krajinović
- (Colombia) Carlos Salamanca
- (Colombia) Michael Quintero

The following players received entry from the qualifying draw:

- (Chile) Jorge Aguilar
- (Italy) Enrico Burzi
- (Brazil) Eric Gomes
- (Poland) Grzegorz Panfil
- (Argentina) Alejandro Fabbri (as a Lucky loser)

The following players received entry into the singles main draw as special exempt:

- (Chile) Guillermo Hormazábal

== Champions ==
=== Men's singles ===
(Argentina) Horacio Zeballos def. (Colombia) Carlos Salamanca, 7–5, 6–2

=== Men's doubles ===
(Argentina) Diego Álvarez / (Spain) Carles Poch-Gradin def. (Ecuador) Carlos Avellán / (Brazil) Eric Gomes, 7–6(7), 6–1
