= 2026 Kia Open Bucaramanga – Doubles =

Doubles
- 2026 Kia Open Bucaramanga

Final
- Champions: (Colombia) Juan Sebastián Gómez (Chile) Matías Soto
- Runners-up: (Ukraine) Vladyslav Orlov (Colombia) Adrià Soriano Barrera
- Score: 6–2, 6–4

Events
Singles	Doubles
- Kia Open Bucaramanga

Sergio Galdós and Nicolás Jarry were the defending champions from when the tournament was last held in 2017, but they chose not to defend their title.

Juan Sebastián Gómez and Matías Soto won the title after defeating Vladyslav Orlov and Adrià Soriano Barrera 6–2, 6–4 in the final.

== Seeds ==
1. (Brazil) Luís Britto / (Brazil) Paulo André Saraiva dos Santos (first round)
2. (Ukraine) Vladyslav Orlov / (Colombia) Adrià Soriano Barrera (final)
3. (Argentina) Valentín Basel / (Argentina) Franco Ribero (quarterfinals)
4. (Argentina) Guido Iván Justo / (Uruguay) Franco Roncadelli (withdrew)

== Draw ==
Key

- Q = Qualifier
- WC = Wild card
- LL = Lucky loser
- Alt = Alternate
- ITF = ITF entry
- PR = Protected ranking
- SR = Special ranking
- SE = Special exempt
- JE = Junior exempt
- JR = Junior Accelerator Programme entrant
- CO = College Accelerator Programme entrant
- NG = Next Gen Accelerator Program entrant
- w/o = Walkover
- r = Retired
- d = Defaulted

First round
1	(Brazil) L Britto (Brazil) PA Saraiva dos Santos	4	4
(Colombia) JS Gómez (Chile) M Soto	6	6
(Argentina) LE Ambrogi (Argentina) Lorenzo Joaquín Rodríguez	6	6
(Argentina) Juan Estévez (Argentina) JM La Serna	3	0
Alt	(Dominican Republic) P Bertran (Colombia) Nicolás Rico Arias	2	1
WC	(Colombia) Sergio Luis Hernández Ramírez (Colombia) Frazier Rengifo	6	6
WC	(Colombia) Juan Sebastián Osorio (Colombia) A Urrea	6^{5}	6	[10]
Alt	(Chile) Daniel Antonio Núñez (Hong Kong) Wong Tsz-fu	7^{7}	4	[1]
(Brazil) JVC Loureiro (Brazil) Natan Rodrigues	7^{12}	6
(Brazil) Bruno Fernandez (Argentina) Máximo Zeitune	6^{10}	2
(Argentina) V Aboian (Argentina) Carlos María Zárate	6^{5}	6	[7]
3	(Argentina) Valentín Basel (Argentina) F Ribero	7^{7}	4	[10]
(United States) Felix Corwin (Canada) Benjamin Thomas George	3	1
(Spain) Iván Marrero Curbelo (Switzerland) J Nikles	6	6
(Italy) Matteo Covato (France) M Janvier	2	2
2	(Ukraine) V Orlov (Colombia) A Soriano Barrera	6	6

Quarterfinals
(Colombia) JS Gómez (Chile) M Soto	6	7^{7}
(Argentina) LE Ambrogi (Argentina) LJ Rodríguez	4	6^{4}
WC	(Colombia) SL Hernández Ramírez (Colombia) F Rengifo	6	3	[10]
WC	(Colombia) JS Osorio (Colombia) A Urrea	4	6	[5]
(Brazil) JVC Loureiro (Brazil) N Rodrigues	7^{7}	7^{9}
3	(Argentina) V Basel (Argentina) F Ribero	6^{5}	6^{7}
(Spain) I Marrero Curbelo (Switzerland) J Nikles	7	3	[6]
2	(Ukraine) V Orlov (Colombia) A Soriano Barrera	5	6	[10]

Semifinals
(Colombia) JS Gómez (Chile) M Soto	7^{7}	7
WC	(Colombia) SL Hernández Ramírez (Colombia) F Rengifo	6^{4}	5
(Brazil) JVC Loureiro (Brazil) N Rodrigues
2	(Ukraine) V Orlov (Colombia) A Soriano Barrera	w/o

Final
(Colombia) JS Gómez (Chile) M Soto	6	6
2	(Ukraine) V Orlov (Colombia) A Soriano Barrera	2	4
