= 2016 Claro Open Bucaramanga =

- Date: 25–31 January 2016
- Edition: 8th
- Draw: 32S / 16D
- Prize money: $50,000+H
- Surface: Clay
- Location: Bucaramanga, Colombia

Champions

Singles
- (Austria) Gerald Melzer

Doubles
- (Chile) Julio Peralta / (Argentina) Horacio Zeballos
← 2015 ·	Claro Open Bucaramanga	· 2017 →

The 2016 Claro Open Bucaramanga was a professional tennis tournament played on clay courts. It was the eighth edition of the tournament which was part of the 2016 ATP Challenger Tour. It took place in Bucaramanga, Colombia between 25 and 31 January 2016.

== Singles main draw entrants ==
=== Seeds ===
Country	Player	Rank^{1}	Seed
DOM	Víctor Estrella Burgos	55	1
ITA	Paolo Lorenzi	57	2
ARG	Facundo Bagnis	109	3
ESP	Albert Montañés	115	4
BRA	Rogério Dutra Silva	116	5
COL	Alejandro Falla	119	6
ARG	Horacio Zeballos	126	7
POR	Gastão Elias	135	8

- ^{1} Rankings are as of January 18, 2016.

=== Other entrants ===
The following players received wildcards into the singles main draw:

- (Colombia) Nicolás Barrientos
- (Colombia) Alejandro Falla
- (United States) Tommy Paul
- (Colombia) Eduardo Struvay

The following players received entry as alternates:

- (Argentina) Guido Andreozzi
- (Belgium) Arthur De Greef

The following players received entry from the qualifying draw:

- (Argentina) Maximiliano Estévez
- (Colombia) Daniel Elahi Galán
- (Dominican Republic) José Hernández
- (Chile) Nicolás Jarry

== Champions ==
=== Singles ===
- (Austria) Gerald Melzer def. (Italy) Paolo Lorenzi 6–3, 6–1

=== Doubles ===
- (Chile) Julio Peralta / (Argentina) Horacio Zeballos def. (Peru) Sergio Galdós / (Venezuela) Luis David Martínez 6–2, 6–2
