= 2010 Seguros Bolívar Open Bucaramanga – Doubles =

Doubles
- 2010 Seguros Bolívar Open Bucaramanga

Final
- Champions: (Spain) Pere Riba (Spain) Santiago Ventura
- Runners-up: (Brazil) Marcelo Demoliner (Brazil) Rodrigo Guidolin
- Score: 6–2, 6–2

Events
Singles	Doubles
← 2009 ·	Seguros Bolívar Open Bucaramanga	· 2011 →

Diego Álvarez and Carles Poch-Gradin were the defending champions, but they chose not to participate this year.
Pere Riba and Santiago Ventura won in the final 6–2, 6–2, against Marcelo Demoliner and Rodrigo Guidolin.

== Seeds ==
1. (United Kingdom) Jonathan Marray / (United Kingdom) Jamie Murray (quarterfinals)
2. (Spain) David Marrero / (Spain) Rubén Ramírez Hidalgo (first round)
3. (Spain) Pere Riba / (Spain) Santiago Ventura (champions)
4. (Brazil) Marcelo Demoliner / (Brazil) Rodrigo Guidolin (final)

== Draw ==
=== Key ===
- Q = Qualifier
- WC = Wild card
- LL = Lucky loser
- Alt = Alternate
- SE = Special exempt
- PR = Protected ranking
- ITF = ITF entry
- JE = Junior exempt
- w/o = Walkover
- r = Retired
- d = Defaulted
- SR = Special ranking

=== Draw ===
First round
1	(United Kingdom) J Marray (United Kingdom) J Murray	6	6
WC	(Venezuela) R Corrente (Venezuela) LD Martínez	2	2
(Argentina) JP Brzezicki (Uruguay) M Felder	1	4
(Brazil) T Alves (Brazil) R Mello	6	6
4	(Brazil) M Demoliner (Brazil) R Guidolin	6	6
(Brazil) J Souza (Brazil) C Zampieri	1	0
(Colombia) A González (Colombia) C Salamanca	6	7
(Brazil) F Romboli (Brazil) J Silva	4	6^{5}
WC	(Colombia) JS Cabal (Colombia) E Struvay	6	6
(Brazil) F Ferreiro (Spain) F Vicente	4	3
(Argentina) J-M Aranguren (Argentina) C Berlocq	1	3
3	(Spain) P Riba (Spain) S Ventura	6	6
(Argentina) F Bagnis (Argentina) E Schwank	6	7
WC	(Colombia) N Barrientos (Colombia) S Serrano	1	5
(Brazil) A Ghem (Mexico) S González	6	6
2	(Spain) D Marrero (Spain) R Ramírez Hidalgo	1	3

Quarterfinals
1	(United Kingdom) J Marray (United Kingdom) J Murray	4	5
(Brazil) T Alves (Brazil) R Mello	6	7
4	(Brazil) M Demoliner (Brazil) R Guidolin	7	6^{4}
(Colombia) A González (Colombia) C Salamanca	6	3
(Colombia) JS Cabal (Colombia) E Struvay	6^{4}	3
3	(Spain) P Riba (Spain) S Ventura	7	6
(Argentina) F Bagnis (Argentina) E Schwank	2	2
(Brazil) A Ghem (Mexico) S González	6	6

Semifinals
(Brazil) T Alves (Brazil) R Mello	3	3
4	(Brazil) M Demoliner (Brazil) R Guidolin	6	6
3	(Spain) P Riba (Spain) S Ventura	6	4	[10]
(Brazil) A Ghem (Mexico) S González	4	6	[7]

Final
4	(Brazil) M Demoliner (Brazil) R Guidolin	2	2
3	(Spain) P Riba (Spain) S Ventura	6	6
