= 2009 Seguros Bolívar Open Bucaramanga – Doubles =

Doubles
- 2009 Seguros Bolívar Open Bucaramanga

Final
- Champions: (Argentina) Diego Álvarez (Spain) Carles Poch Gradin
- Runners-up: (Ecuador) Carlos Avellán (Brazil) Eric Gomes
- Score: 7–6(7), 6–1

Events
| Singles | Doubles |
| ← 2008 · | Seguros Bolívar Open Bucaramanga | · 2010 → |

Diego Álvarez and Carles Poch Gradin defeated Carlos Avellán and Eric Gomes 7–6(7), 6–1 in the final. They became the first champions of this tournament.

== Seeds ==
1. (Sweden) Johan Brunström / (Netherlands Antilles) Jean-Julien Rojer (semifinals)
2. (Brazil) Caio Zampieri / (Argentina) Horacio Zeballos (first round)
3. (Brazil) André Miele / (Brazil) Márcio Torres (first round)
4. (Brazil) Ricardo Hocevar / (Brazil) João Souza (first round)

== Draw ==
=== Key ===
- Q = Qualifier
- WC = Wild card
- LL = Lucky loser
- Alt = Alternate
- SE = Special exempt
- PR = Protected ranking
- ITF = ITF entry
- JE = Junior exempt
- w/o = Walkover
- r = Retired
- d = Defaulted
- SR = Special ranking

=== Draw ===
First round
1 | (Sweden) J Brunström (Netherlands Antilles) J-J Rojer | 6 | 6
(Venezuela) J de Armas (Argentina) A Fabbri | 4 | 2
WC | (United States) Geoff Gehrke (Romania) G Moraru | 1 | 2
WC | (Colombia) M Quintero (Colombia) Juan Carlos Spir | 6 | 6
4 | (Brazil) R Hocevar (Brazil) J Souza | 4 | 2
(Republic of Ireland) C Niland (Poland) G Panfil | 6 | 6
WC | (Colombia) A González (Colombia) E Struvay | 3 | 6 | [7]
(Ecuador) C Avellán (Brazil) Eric Gomes | 6 | 3 | [10]
(Argentina) J-P Amado (Dominican Republic) V Estrella | 6 | 6
(Peru) I Miranda (Argentina) D Veronelli | 3 | 4
(Ecuador) JC Campozano (Colombia) C Salamanca | 6 | 6
3 | (Brazil) A Miele (Brazil) M Torres | 2 | 2
(Argentina) D Álvarez (Spain) C Poch-Gradin | 6 | 6
(Italy) Enrico Burzi (Italy) A di Mauro | 2 | 4
(Colombia) JS Cabal (Spain) F Vicente | 7 | 6^{7} | [10]
2 | (Brazil) C Zampieri (Argentina) H Zeballos | 5 | 7 | [3]

Quarterfinals
1 | (Sweden) J Brunström (Netherlands Antilles) J-J Rojer | 6 | 6
WC | (Colombia) M Quintero (Colombia) J-C Spir | 2 | 4
(Republic of Ireland) C Niland (Poland) G Panfil | 3 | 4
(Ecuador) C Avellán (Brazil) E Gomes | 6 | 6
(Argentina) J-P Amado (Dominican Republic) V Estrella | 6 | 6
(Ecuador) JC Campozano (Colombia) C Salamanca | 4 | 4
(Argentina) D Álvarez (Spain) C Poch-Gradin | 6 | 6
(Colombia) JS Cabal (Spain) F Vicente | 3 | 4

Semifinals
1 | (Sweden) J Brunström (Netherlands Antilles) J-J Rojer | 5 | 6^{5}
(Ecuador) C Avellán (Brazil) E Gomes | 7 | 7
(Argentina) J-P Amado (Dominican Republic) V Estrella | 4 | 2
(Argentina) D Álvarez (Spain) C Poch-Gradin | 6 | 6

Finals
(Ecuador) C Avellán (Brazil) E Gomes | 6^{7} | 1
(Argentina) D Álvarez (Spain) C Poch-Gradin | 7 | 6
