= 2026 Kia Open Bucaramanga – Singles =

Singles
- 2026 Kia Open Bucaramanga

Final
- Champion: (Chile) Matías Soto
- Runner-up: (Argentina) Guido Iván Justo
- Score: 6–3, 6–3

Events
| Singles | Doubles |
- Kia Open Bucaramanga

Guido Pella was the defending champion from when the tournament was last held in 2017 but was unable to defend his title as he had since retired from professional tennis.

Matías Soto won the title after defeating Guido Iván Justo 6–3, 6–3 in the final.

== Seeds ==
1. (Argentina) Guido Iván Justo (final)
2. (Chile) Matías Soto (champion)
3. (Uruguay) Franco Roncadelli (semifinals, retired)
4. (Argentina) Juan Manuel La Serna (quarterfinals)
5. (United States) Garrett Johns (second round)
6. (Colombia) Adrià Soriano Barrera (first round)
7. (Argentina) Luciano Emanuel Ambrogi (second round)
8. (Argentina) Juan Estévez (first round)

== Draw ==
Key

- Q = Qualifier
- WC = Wild card
- LL = Lucky loser
- Alt = Alternate
- ITF = ITF entry
- PR = Protected ranking
- SR = Special ranking
- SE = Special exempt
- JE = Junior exempt
- JR = Junior Accelerator Programme entrant
- CO = College Accelerator Programme entrant
- NG = Next Gen Accelerator Program entrant
- w/o = Walkover
- r = Retired
- d = Defaulted

=== Finals ===
Semifinals
1 | (Argentina) Guido Iván Justo | 6 | 3
3 | (Uruguay) Franco Roncadelli | 2 | 1^{r}
Q | (Chile) Nicolás Villalón | 3 | 3
2 | (Chile) Matías Soto | 6 | 6

Final
1 | (Argentina) Guido Iván Justo | 3 | 3
2 | (Chile) Matías Soto | 6 | 6

=== Top half ===
First round
1 | (Argentina) GI Justo | 7^{7} | 6
(Brazil) Bruno Fernandez | 6^{5} | 4
Q | (Canada) Benjamin Thomas George | 3 | 6 | 3
(Spain) Iván Marrero Curbelo | 6 | 2 | 6
(Switzerland) J Nikles | 7 | 3 | 6
Q | (Chile) Benjamín Torrealba | 5 | 6 | 2
(United States) C Kingsley | 6 | 6^{5} | 6
6 | (Colombia) A Soriano Barrera | 3 | 7^{7} | 3
3 | (Uruguay) F Roncadelli | 4 | 6 | 6
(Colombia) Samuel Heredia | 6 | 3 | 4
(Colombia) Samuel Alejandro Linde Palacios | 2 | 4
Q | (Peru) Christopher Li | 6 | 6
(Argentina) Lorenzo Joaquín Rodríguez | 6 | 6
(Colombia) JS Gómez | 2 | 1
(Argentina) V Aboian | 2 | 7 | 4
5 | (United States) G Johns | 6 | 5 | 6

Second round
1 | (Argentina) GI Justo | 6 | 6
(Spain) I Marrero Curbelo | 4 | 2
(Switzerland) J Nikles | 6 | 6
(United States) C Kingsley | 4 | 3
3 | (Uruguay) F Roncadelli | 6^{3} | 6 | 6
Q | (Peru) C Li | 7^{7} | 1 | 1
(Argentina) LJ Rodríguez | 6 | 6
5 | (United States) G Johns | 2 | 1

Quarterfinals
1 | (Argentina) GI Justo | 6 | 6
(Switzerland) J Nikles | 2 | 0
3 | (Uruguay) F Roncadelli | 2 | 6 | 6
(Argentina) LJ Rodríguez | 6 | 3 | 2

Semifinals
1 | (Argentina) GI Justo | 6 | 3
3 | (Uruguay) F Roncadelli | 2 | 1^{r}

=== Bottom half ===
First round
8 | (Argentina) Juan Estévez | 4 | 1
(France) M Janvier | 6 | 6
(Ukraine) V Orlov | 5 | 5
Q | (Chile) Nicolás Villalón | 7 | 7
WC | (Colombia) Frazier Rengifo | 1 | 3
(Argentina) Carlos María Zárate | 6 | 6
(United States) Felix Corwin | 3 | 5
4 | (Argentina) JM La Serna | 6 | 7
7 | (Argentina) LE Ambrogi | 7 | 6
(Brazil) PA Saraiva dos Santos | 5 | 0
WC | (Colombia) Juan Sebastián Osorio | 2 | 4
Q | (Colombia) Daniel Salazar | 6 | 6
(Dominican Republic) P Bertran | 6 | 3 | 6
WC | (Colombia) Sergio Luis Hernández Ramírez | 4 | 6 | 4
Q | (Chile) Daniel Antonio Núñez | 1 | 6^{9}
2 | (Chile) M Soto | 6 | 7^{11}

Second round
(France) M Janvier | 4 | 1
Q | (Chile) N Villalón | 6 | 6
(Argentina) CM Zárate | 3 | 7^{7} | 1
4 | (Argentina) JM La Serna | 6 | 6^{5} | 6
7 | (Argentina) LE Ambrogi | 0 | 3
Q | (Colombia) D Salazar | 6 | 6
(Dominican Republic) P Bertran | 6^{7} | 0
2 | (Chile) M Soto | 7^{9} | 6

Quarterfinals
Q | (Chile) N Villalón | 4 | 7 | 6
4 | (Argentina) JM La Serna | 6 | 5 | 4
Q | (Colombia) D Salazar | 5 | 1
2 | (Chile) M Soto | 7 | 6

Semifinals
Q | (Chile) N Villalón | 3 | 3
2 | (Chile) M Soto | 6 | 6
