= 2015 Claro Open Bucaramanga =

- Date: 27 January – 1 February
- Edition: 7th
- Draw: 32S / 16D
- Prize money: $50,000+H
- Surface: Clay
- Location: Bucaramanga, Colombia

Champions

Singles
- (Spain) Daniel Gimeno Traver

Doubles
- (Argentina) Guillermo Durán / (Argentina) Andrés Molteni
← 2014 ·	Claro Open Bucaramanga	· 2016 →

The 2015 Claro Open Bucaramanga was a professional tennis tournament played on clay courts. It was the seventh edition of the tournament which was part of the 2015 ATP Challenger Tour. It took place in Bucaramanga, Colombia between 27 January and 1 February 2015.

== Singles main draw entrants ==
=== Seeds ===
Country	Player	Rank^{1}	Seed
ITA	Paolo Lorenzi	64	1
DOM	Víctor Estrella Burgos	77	2
AUT	Andreas Haider-Maurer	79	3
COL	Alejandro Falla	101	4
ESP	Albert Montañés	104	5
COL	Alejandro González	107	6
ESP	Daniel Gimeno Traver	110	7
BRA	João Souza	115	8

- ^{1} Rankings are as of January 19, 2015.

=== Other entrants ===
The following players received wildcards into the singles main draw:

- (Colombia) Alejandro González
- (United States) Kevin Kim
- (Colombia) Pedro Pablo Ruiz
- (Colombia) Eduardo Struvay

The following players received entry from the qualifying draw:

- (Dominican Republic) José Hernández
- (Uruguay) Martín Cuevas
- (Bolivia) Hugo Dellien
- (Brazil) Guilherme Clezar

== Champions ==
=== Singles ===
- (Spain) Daniel Gimeno Traver def. (Portugal) Gastão Elias 6–3, 1–6, 7–5

=== Doubles ===
- (Argentina) Guillermo Durán / (Argentina) Andrés Molteni def. (Colombia) Nicolás Barrientos / (Colombia) Eduardo Struvay 7–5, 6–7^{(8–10)}, [10–0]
