= 2013 Seguros Bolívar Open Bucaramanga – Singles =

Singles
- 2013 Seguros Bolívar Open Bucaramanga

Final
- Champion: (Argentina) Federico Delbonis
- Runner-up: (United States) Wayne Odesnik
- Score: 7–6^{(7–4)}, 6–3

Events
| Singles | Doubles |
| ← 2012 · | Seguros Bolívar Open Bucaramanga | · 2014 → |

Wayne Odesnik was the defending champion but lost in the final to Federico Delbonis 6–7^{(4–7)}, 3–6.

== Seeds ==
1. (Colombia) Santiago Giraldo (first round)
2. (Brazil) Rogério Dutra da Silva (first round)
3. (Argentina) Martín Alund (quarterfinals)
4. (Brazil) João Souza (second round)
5. (Portugal) Gastão Elias (second round)
6. (Argentina) Federico Delbonis (champion)
7. (United States) Wayne Odesnik (final)
8. (Chile) Paul Capdeville (semifinals, retired)

== Draw ==
=== Key ===
- Q = Qualifier
- WC = Wild card
- LL = Lucky loser
- Alt = Alternate
- SE = Special exempt
- PR = Protected ranking
- ITF = ITF entry
- JE = Junior exempt
- w/o = Walkover
- r = Retired
- d = Defaulted
- SR = Special ranking

=== Finals ===
Semifinals
(Colombia) Alejandro González | 1 | 3
7 | (United States) Wayne Odesnik | 6 | 6
8 | (Chile) Paul Capdeville | 1^{r}
6 | (Argentina) Federico Delbonis | 5

Final
7 | (United States) Wayne Odesnik | 6^{4} | 3
6 | (Argentina) Federico Delbonis | 7^{7} | 6

=== Top half ===
First round
1/WC | (Colombia) S Giraldo | 4 | 4
(Argentina) F Bagnis | 6 | 6
(Argentina) F Argüello | 5 | 5
(Argentina) D Schwartzman | 7 | 7
(Colombia) A González | 6 | 6
Q | (Argentina) Patricio Heras | 4 | 3
Q | (Uruguay) M Felder | 3 | 1
5 | (Portugal) G Elias | 6 | 6
3 | (Argentina) M Alund | 6 | 6
Q | (Moldova) R Borvanov | 4 | 2
Q | (Croatia) F Skugor | 6 | 6
WC | (Colombia) Alvaro Ochoa | 4 | 4
(Colombia) C Salamanca | 3 | 7^{7} | 3
(Brazil) R Hocevar | 6 | 6^{4} | 6
(Argentina) R Olivo | 1 | 6 | 6^{5}
7 | (United States) W Odesnik | 6 | 3 | 7^{7}

Second round
(Argentina) F Bagnis | 6 | 6^{5} | 0
(Argentina) D Schwartzman | 3 | 7^{7} | 6
(Colombia) A González | 6 | 6
5 | (Portugal) G Elias | 1 | 3
3 | (Argentina) M Alund | 3 | 6 | 6
Q | (Croatia) F Skugor | 6 | 2 | 3
(Brazil) R Hocevar | 5 | 5
7 | (United States) W Odesnik | 7 | 7

Quarterfinals
(Argentina) D Schwartzman | 7^{7} | 3 | 3
(Colombia) A González | 6^{5} | 6 | 6
3 | (Argentina) M Alund | 5 | 3
7 | (United States) W Odesnik | 7 | 6

Semifinals
(Colombia) A González | 1 | 3
7 | (United States) W Odesnik | 6 | 6

=== Bottom half ===
First round
8 | (Chile) P Capdeville | 6 | 4 | 7^{7}
(Russia) T Gabashvili | 3 | 6 | 6^{5}
(Brazil) G Clezar | 3 | 7 | 4
(Colombia) N Barrientos | 6 | 5 | 6
(Argentina) M Trungelliti | 5 | 1
(Brazil) M Demoliner | 7 | 6
WC | (Colombia) E Struvay | 6 | 6^{5} | 3
4 | (Brazil) J Souza | 3 | 7^{7} | 6
6 | (Argentina) F Delbonis | 6 | 6
(Brazil) A Ghem | 2 | 3
WC | (Chile) N Massú | 6 | 6
(Argentina) A Velotti | 3 | 2
(Portugal) P Sousa | 6 | 6^{3} | 6
(Brazil) F de Paula | 4 | 7^{7} | 1
(Ecuador) JC Campozano | 6 | 6
2 | (Brazil) R Dutra da Silva | 3 | 4

Second round
8 | (Chile) P Capdeville | 6 | 6
(Colombia) N Barrientos | 1 | 4
(Brazil) M Demoliner | 6 | 6
4 | (Brazil) J Souza | 3 | 4
6 | (Argentina) F Delbonis | 6 | 4 | 7^{7}
WC | (Chile) N Massú | 1 | 6 | 6^{4}
(Portugal) P Sousa | 6 | 6
(Ecuador) JC Campozano | 4 | 4

Quarterfinals
8 | (Chile) P Capdeville | 6^{3} | 6 | 6
(Brazil) M Demoliner | 7^{7} | 3 | 2
6 | (Argentina) F Delbonis | 6 | 6
(Portugal) P Sousa | 1 | 3

Semifinals
8 | (Chile) P Capdeville | 1^{r}
6 | (Argentina) F Delbonis | 5
