= 2010 Seguros Bolívar Open Bucaramanga – Singles =

Singles
- 2010 Seguros Bolívar Open Bucaramanga

Final
- Champion: (Argentina) Eduardo Schwank
- Runner-up: (Argentina) Juan Pablo Brzezicki
- Score: 6–4, 6–2

Events
Singles	Doubles
← 2009 ·	Seguros Bolívar Open Bucaramanga	· 2011 →

Horacio Zeballos was the defending champion, but chose not to participate.
Eduardo Schwank won in the final 6–4, 6–2 against Juan Pablo Brzezicki.

== Seeds ==
1. (Argentina) Eduardo Schwank (champion)
2. (Chile) Nicolás Massú (quarterfinals)
3. (Spain) Santiago Ventura (first round)
4. (Colombia) Santiago Giraldo (semifinals)
5. (Spain) Pere Riba (quarterfinals)
6. (Romania) Victor Crivoi (quarterfinals)
7. (Brazil) Thiago Alves (semifinals)
8. (Brazil) Ricardo Mello (quarterfinals)

== Draw ==
=== Key ===
- Q = Qualifier
- WC = Wild card
- LL = Lucky loser
- Alt = Alternate
- SE = Special exempt
- PR = Protected ranking
- ITF = ITF entry
- JE = Junior exempt
- w/o = Walkover
- r = Retired
- d = Defaulted
- SR = Special ranking

=== Finals ===
Semifinals
1	(Argentina) Eduardo Schwank	6	6
4/WC	(Colombia) Santiago Giraldo	2	3
(Argentina) Juan Pablo Brzezicki	6	6
7	(Brazil) Thiago Alves	4	3

Final
1	(Argentina) Eduardo Schwank	6	6
(Argentina) Juan Pablo Brzezicki	4	2

=== Top half ===
First round
1	(Argentina) E Schwank	6	6
Q	(Chile) G Rivera Aránguiz	1	3
WC	(Colombia) E Struvay	3	2
Q	(Argentina) G Pella	6	6
WC	(Venezuela) R Corrente	4	2
(Brazil) M Demoliner	6	6
(Colombia) A González	2	1
8	(Brazil) R Mello	6	6
4/WC	(Colombia) S Giraldo	6	6
Q	(Brazil) L Kirche	4	4
(Mexico) S González	5	2
(Brazil) J Souza	7	6
(Uruguay) M Felder	3	2
(Spain) R Ramírez Hidalgo	6	6
(Colombia) C Salamanca	6	4	6^{4}
5	(Spain) P Riba	4	6	7

Second round
1	(Argentina) E Schwank	6	6
Q	(Argentina) G Pella	3	4
(Brazil) M Demoliner	4	1
8	(Brazil) R Mello	6	6
4/WC	(Colombia) S Giraldo	4	7	6
(Brazil) J Souza	6	6^{4}	4
(Spain) R Ramírez Hidalgo	7	3	4
5	(Spain) P Riba	5	6	6

Quarterfinals
1	(Argentina) E Schwank	6	6
8	(Brazil) R Mello	3	1
4/WC	(Colombia) S Giraldo	6	6
5	(Spain) P Riba	4	1

Semifinals
1	(Argentina) E Schwank	6	6
4/WC	(Colombia) S Giraldo	2	3

=== Bottom half ===
First round
6	(Romania) V Crivoi	7	7
(Brazil) A Ghem	6^{4}	6^{6}
(Brazil) C Zampieri	3	7	7
(Spain) D Marrero	6	6^{5}	6^{8}
(Argentina) JP Brzezicki	6	6
WC	(Colombia) S Serrano	2	0
(Argentina) D Junqueira	6	6
3	(Spain) S Ventura	3	1
7	(Brazil) T Alves	6	6
(Chile) P Capdeville	4	1
(Argentina) C Berlocq	6	6
(Argentina) S Decoud	1	1
(Argentina) J-M Aranguren	6	1	4
(Brazil) J Silva	4	6	6
Q	(Argentina) F Bagnis	2	4
2	(Chile) N Massú	6	6

Second round
6	(Romania) V Crivoi	6	3	6
(Brazil) C Zampieri	4	6	4
(Argentina) JP Brzezicki	6	7
(Argentina) D Junqueira	0	5
7	(Brazil) T Alves	6	6
(Argentina) C Berlocq	4	3
(Brazil) J Silva	2	6	3
2	(Chile) N Massú	6	3	6

Quarterfinals
6	(Romania) V Crivoi	1	5
(Argentina) JP Brzezicki	6	7
7	(Brazil) T Alves	6	7
2	(Chile) N Massú	3	6^{0}

Semifinals
(Argentina) JP Brzezicki	6	6
7	(Brazil) T Alves	4	3
