= 2015 Claro Open Bucaramanga – Doubles =

Doubles
- 2015 Claro Open Bucaramanga

Final
- Champions: (Argentina) Guillermo Durán (Argentina) Andrés Molteni
- Runners-up: (Colombia) Nicolás Barrientos (Colombia) Eduardo Struvay
- Score: 7–5, 6–7^{(8–10)}, [10–0]

Events
Singles	Doubles
- Claro Open Bucaramanga

Juan Sebastián Cabal and Robert Farah were the defending champions, but did not participate.

Guillermo Durán and Andrés Molteni won the title, defeating Nicolás Barrientos and Eduardo Struvay 7–5, 6–7^{(8–10)}, [10–0] in the final.

== Seeds ==
1. (Mexico) César Ramírez / (Mexico) Miguel Ángel Reyes-Varela (first round)
2. (Colombia) Nicolás Barrientos / (Colombia) Eduardo Struvay (final)
3. (Argentina) Guillermo Durán / (Argentina) Andrés Molteni (champions)
4. (Germany) Gero Kretschmer / (Germany) Alexander Satschko (semifinals)

== Draw ==
Key

- Q = Qualifier
- WC = Wild card
- LL = Lucky loser
- Alt = Alternate
- ITF = ITF entry
- PR = Protected ranking
- SR = Special ranking
- SE = Special exempt
- JE = Junior exempt
- JR = Junior Accelerator Programme entrant
- CO = College Accelerator Programme entrant
- NG = Next Gen Accelerator Program entrant
- w/o = Walkover
- r = Retired
- d = Defaulted

=== Draw ===
First round
1	(Mexico) C Ramírez (Mexico) MÁ Reyes-Varela	3	1
(Uruguay) M Cuevas (Argentina) G Pella	6	6
Alt	(Italy) P Lorenzi (Italy) Enrico Becuzzi	6	6
WC	(United States) Sam Barnett (United States) K Kim	1	4
3	(Argentina) G Durán (Argentina) A Molteni	6	6
(Brazil) A Ghem (Austria) G Melzer	2	0
(Ecuador) G Escobar (Australia) J Kubler	6	0^{r}
WC	(Colombia) DE Galán (Colombia) JS Gómez	3	3
(Spain) R Carballés Baena (Spain) A Montañés	7	0
(Peru) S Galdós (Venezuela) R Maytín	5	0^{r}
WC	(Colombia) José Daniel Bendeck (Argentina) Gregorio Cordonnier	2	4
4	(Germany) G Kretschmer (Germany) A Satschko	6	6
(Brazil) M Demoliner (Portugal) G Elias	6	6
(Spain) D Gimeno-Traver (Spain) A Menéndez-Maceiras	3	4
(Argentina) F Bagnis (Argentina) A Collarini	7^{7}	2^{r}
2	(Colombia) N Barrientos (Colombia) E Struvay	6^{1}	3

Quarterfinals
(Uruguay) M Cuevas (Argentina) G Pella	6	6
Alt	(Italy) P Lorenzi (Italy) E Becuzzi	1	2
3	(Argentina) G Durán (Argentina) A Molteni	7^{8}	6
WC	(Colombia) DE Galán (Colombia) JS Gómez	6^{6}	2
(Spain) R Carballés Baena (Spain) A Montañés	1	5
4	(Germany) G Kretschmer (Germany) A Satschko	6	7
(Brazil) M Demoliner (Portugal) G Elias	6^{1}	0
2	(Colombia) N Barrientos (Colombia) E Struvay	7^{7}	6

Semifinals
(Uruguay) M Cuevas (Argentina) G Pella	1	3
3	(Argentina) G Durán (Argentina) A Molteni	6	6
4	(Germany) G Kretschmer (Germany) A Satschko	4	4
2	(Colombia) N Barrientos (Colombia) E Struvay	6	6

Final
3	(Argentina) G Durán (Argentina) A Molteni	7	6^{8}	[10]
2	(Colombia) N Barrientos (Colombia) E Struvay	5	7^{10}	[0]
