= 2010 Seguros Bolívar Open Bucaramanga =

- Date: January 25 – January 31
- Edition: 2nd
- Location: Bucaramanga, Colombia

Champions

Singles
- (Argentina) Eduardo Schwank

Doubles
- (Spain) Pere Riba / (Spain) Santiago Ventura
| ← 2009 · | Seguros Bolívar Open Bucaramanga | · 2011 → |

The 2010 Seguros Bolívar Open Bucaramanga was a professional tennis tournament played on outdoor red clay courts. It was part of the 2010 ATP Challenger Tour. It took place in Bucaramanga, Colombia between 25 and 31 January 2010.

== ATP entrants ==
=== Seeds ===
| Country | Player | Rank^{1} | Seed |
|---|---|---|---|
| ARG | Eduardo Schwank | 95 | 1 |
| CHI | Nicolás Massú | 97 | 2 |
| ESP | Santiago Ventura | 106 | 3 |
| COL | Santiago Giraldo | 114 | 4 |
| ESP | Pere Riba | 120 | 5 |
| ROU | Victor Crivoi | 121 | 6 |
| BRA | Thiago Alves | 141 | 7 |
| BRA | Ricardo Mello | 142 | 8 |

- Rankings are as of January 18, 2010

=== Other entrants ===
The following players received wildcards into the singles main draw:

- (Venezuela) Ricardo Corrente
- (Colombia) Alejandro González
- (Colombia) Sebastián Serrano
- (Colombia) Eduardo Struvay

The following players received entry from the qualifying draw:

- (Argentina) Facundo Bagnis
- (Brazil) Leonardo Kirche
- (Argentina) Guido Pella
- (Chile) Guillermo Rivera Aránguiz

== Champions ==
=== Singles ===
(Argentina) Eduardo Schwank def. (Argentina) Juan Pablo Brzezicki, 6–4, 6–2

=== Doubles ===
(Spain) Pere Riba / (Spain) Santiago Ventura def. (Brazil) Marcelo Demoliner / (Brazil) Rodrigo Guidolin, 6–2, 6–2
