= 2017 Claro Open Floridablanca =

- Date: 7 – 12 August
- Edition: 9th
- Draw: 32S / 16D
- Surface: Clay
- Location: Floridablanca, Colombia

Champions

Singles
- (Argentina) Guido Pella

Doubles
- (Peru) Sergio Galdós / (Chile) Nicolás Jarry
- Claro Open Floridablanca

The 2017 Claro Open Floridablanca was a professional tennis tournament played on clay courts. It was the ninth edition of the tournament which was part of the 2017 ATP Challenger Tour. It took place in Floridablanca, Colombia, during 7–12 August 2017.

== Singles main-draw entrants ==
=== Seeds ===
Country	Player	Rank^{1}	Seed
ARG	Guido Pella	100	1
DOM	Víctor Estrella Burgos	107	2
CHI	Nicolás Jarry	137	3
BRA	João Souza	156	4
POR	Gastão Elias	171	5
BRA	Guilherme Clezar	264	6
DOM	José Hernández-Fernández	265	7
AUT	Michael Linzer	276	8

- ^{1} Rankings are as of 31 July 2017.

=== Other entrants ===
The following players received wildcards into the singles main draw:

- (United States) Charles Force
- (Colombia) Felipe Ramírez Luna
- (Colombia) Carlos Salamanca
- (Colombia) Pedro Uribe

The following players received entry from the qualifying draw:

- (Brazil) Oscar José Gutierrez
- (Chile) Gonzalo Lama
- (Argentina) Juan Ignacio Londero
- (Argentina) Camilo Ugo Carabelli

== Champions ==
=== Singles ===
- (Argentina) Guido Pella def. (Argentina) Facundo Argüello 6–2, 6–4.

=== Doubles ===
- (Peru) Sergio Galdós / (Chile) Nicolás Jarry def. (United States) Sekou Bangoura / (United States) Evan King 6–3, 5–7, [10–1].
