= 2017 Claro Open Floridablanca – Doubles =

Doubles
- 2017 Claro Open Floridablanca

Final
- Champions: (Peru) Sergio Galdós (Chile) Nicolás Jarry
- Runners-up: (United States) Sekou Bangoura (United States) Evan King
- Score: 6–3, 5–7, [10–1]

Events
Singles	Doubles
- Claro Open Floridablanca

Julio Peralta and Horacio Zeballos were the defending champions but chose not to defend their title.

Sergio Galdós and Nicolás Jarry won the title after defeating Sekou Bangoura and Evan King 6–3, 5–7, [10–1] in the final.

== Seeds ==
1. (Peru) Sergio Galdós / (Chile) Nicolás Jarry (champions)
2. (United States) Sekou Bangoura / (United States) Evan King (final)
3. (Brazil) Fabrício Neis / (Mexico) Miguel Ángel Reyes-Varela (first round)
4. (Brazil) Pedro Bernardi / (Brazil) Guilherme Clezar (first round)

== Draw ==
Key

- Q = Qualifier
- WC = Wild card
- LL = Lucky loser
- Alt = Alternate
- ITF = ITF entry
- PR = Protected ranking
- SR = Special ranking
- SE = Special exempt
- JE = Junior exempt
- JR = Junior Accelerator Programme entrant
- CO = College Accelerator Programme entrant
- NG = Next Gen Accelerator Program entrant
- w/o = Walkover
- r = Retired
- d = Defaulted

First round
1	(Peru) S Galdós (Chile) N Jarry	6	6
(Brazil) F Romboli (Brazil) E Russi Assumpção	2	1
(Colombia) DE Galán (Brazil) JP Sorgi	4	7^{7}	[8]
(Zimbabwe) B Lock (United States) Evan Song	6	6^{2}	[10]
4	(Brazil) P Bernardi (Brazil) G Clezar	7	4	[8]
(Peru) M Echazú (Austria) M Linzer	5	6	[10]
WC	(United States) Charles Force (Colombia) Felipe Ramírez Luna	4	2
(Colombia) A González (Venezuela) LD Martínez	6	6
PR	(Brazil) N Santos (Brazil) Alexandre Tsuchiya	1	5
(Argentina) F Argüello (Argentina) F Mena	6	7
WC	(Colombia) Felipe Mantilla (Colombia) C Rodríguez	7^{10}	7
3	(Brazil) F Neis (Mexico) MÁ Reyes-Varela	6^{8}	5
(Argentina) JI Londero (Chile) Jorge Montero	6	2	[10]
(Dominican Republic) J Hernández-Fernández (Peru) JP Varillas	3	6	[8]
WC	(Colombia) A Falla (Venezuela) R Maytín	2	3
2	(United States) S Bangoura (United States) E King	6	6

Quarterfinals
1	(Peru) S Galdós (Chile) N Jarry	7^{7}	7^{7}
(Zimbabwe) B Lock (United States) E Song	6^{5}	6^{5}
(Peru) M Echazú (Austria) M Linzer	7^{7}	6
(Colombia) A González (Venezuela) LD Martínez	6^{4}	1
(Argentina) F Argüello (Argentina) F Mena	6	6
WC	(Colombia) F Mantilla (Colombia) C Rodríguez	3	4
(Argentina) JI Londero (Chile) J Montero	1	2^{r}
2	(United States) S Bangoura (United States) E King	6	3

Semifinals
1	(Peru) S Galdós (Chile) N Jarry	6	6
(Peru) M Echazú (Austria) M Linzer	1	4
(Argentina) F Argüello (Argentina) F Mena	2	2
2	(United States) S Bangoura (United States) E King	6	6

Final
1	(Peru) S Galdós (Chile) N Jarry	6	5	[10]
2	(United States) S Bangoura (United States) E King	3	7	[1]
