= 2013 Seguros Bolívar Open Bucaramanga – Doubles =

Doubles
- 2013 Seguros Bolívar Open Bucaramanga

Final
- Champions: (Brazil) Marcelo Demoliner (Croatia) Franko Škugor
- Runners-up: (Peru) Sergio Galdós (Argentina) Marco Trungelliti
- Score: 7–6^{(10–8)}, 6–2

Events
Singles	Doubles
← 2012 ·	Seguros Bolívar Open Bucaramanga	· 2014 →

Ariel Behar and Horacio Zeballos were the defending champions but decided not to participate.
Marcelo Demoliner and Franko Škugor won the final 7–6^{(10–8)}, 6–2 against Sergio Galdós and Marco Trungelliti.

== Seeds ==
1. (Brazil) Rogério Dutra da Silva / (Brazil) João Souza (first round)
2. (Brazil) Marcelo Demoliner / (Croatia) Franko Škugor (champions)
3. (Argentina) Facundo Bagnis / (Argentina) Federico Delbonis (semifinals)
4. (Brazil) Fabiano de Paula / (Brazil) André Ghem (quarterfinals)

== Draw ==
=== Key ===
- Q = Qualifier
- WC = Wild card
- LL = Lucky loser
- Alt = Alternate
- SE = Special exempt
- PR = Protected ranking
- ITF = ITF entry
- JE = Junior exempt
- w/o = Walkover
- r = Retired
- d = Defaulted
- SR = Special ranking

=== Draw ===
First round
1	(Brazil) R Dutra da Silva (Brazil) J Souza	5	4
WC	(Colombia) N Barrientos (Colombia) E Struvay	7	6
(Peru) D Beretta (Brazil) G Clezar	6^{2}	3
(Peru) S Galdós (Argentina) M Trungelliti	7^{7}	6
3	(Argentina) F Bagnis (Argentina) F Delbonis	6^{4}	7	[10]
(Italy) A Motti (Colombia) C Salamanca	7^{7}	5	[6]
(Ecuador) JC Campozano (Argentina) R Olivo	6	4	[10]
(Argentina) M Alund (Argentina) D Schwartzman	4	6	[5]
WC	(United States) Sam Barnett (United States) K Kim	2	0
(Portugal) G Elias (Portugal) P Sousa	6	6
(Chile) P Capdeville (Uruguay) M Felder	7	3	[3]
4	(Brazil) F de Paula (Brazil) A Ghem	5	6	[10]
(Argentina) F Argüello (Argentina) A Velotti	3	2
WC	(Brazil) R Hocevar (Chile) N Massú	6	6
(Russia) T Gabashvili (Colombia) A González	2	2
2	(Brazil) M Demoliner (Croatia) F Škugor	6	6

Quarterfinals
WC	(Colombia) N Barrientos (Colombia) E Struvay	6	1	[9]
(Peru) S Galdós (Argentina) M Trungelliti	3	6	[11]
3	(Argentina) F Bagnis (Argentina) F Delbonis	5	6	[10]
(Ecuador) JC Campozano (Argentina) R Olivo	7	2	[5]
(Portugal) G Elias (Portugal) P Sousa	3	6	[10]
3	(Brazil) F de Paula (Brazil) A Ghem	6	3	[8]
WC	(Brazil) R Hocevar (Chile) N Massú	5	3
2	(Brazil) M Demoliner (Croatia) F Škugor	7	6

Semifinals
(Peru) S Galdós (Argentina) M Trungelliti	0	7^{7}	[10]
3	(Argentina) F Bagnis (Argentina) F Delbonis	6	6^{5}	[6]
(Portugal) G Elias (Portugal) P Sousa
2	(Brazil) M Demoliner (Croatia) F Škugor	w/o

Final
(Peru) S Galdós (Argentina) M Trungelliti	6^{8}	2
2	(Brazil) M Demoliner (Croatia) F Škugor	7^{10}	6
