= 2017 Claro Open Floridablanca – Singles =

Singles
- 2017 Claro Open Floridablanca

Final
- Champion: (Argentina) Guido Pella
- Runner-up: (Argentina) Facundo Argüello
- Score: 6–2, 6–4

Events
Singles	Doubles
- Claro Open Floridablanca

Gerald Melzer was the defending champion but chose not to defend his title.

Guido Pella won the title after defeating Facundo Argüello 6–2, 6–4 in the final.

== Seeds ==
1. (Argentina) Guido Pella (champion)
2. (Dominican Republic) Víctor Estrella Burgos (first round)
3. (Chile) Nicolás Jarry (first round)
4. (Brazil) João Souza (quarterfinals)
5. (Portugal) Gastão Elias (semifinals)
6. (Brazil) Guilherme Clezar (quarterfinals)
7. (Dominican Republic) José Hernández-Fernández (second round)
8. (Austria) Michael Linzer (quarterfinals)

== Draw ==
Key

- Q = Qualifier
- WC = Wild card
- LL = Lucky loser
- Alt = Alternate
- ITF = ITF entry
- PR = Protected ranking
- SR = Special ranking
- SE = Special exempt
- JE = Junior exempt
- JR = Junior Accelerator Programme entrant
- CO = College Accelerator Programme entrant
- NG = Next Gen Accelerator Program entrant
- w/o = Walkover
- r = Retired
- d = Defaulted

=== Finals ===
Semifinals
1	(Argentina) Guido Pella	6	6
5	(Portugal) Gastão Elias	3	3
(Argentina) Facundo Argüello	6	7^{7}
Q	(Chile) Gonzalo Lama	0	6^{4}

Final
1	(Argentina) Guido Pella	6	6
(Argentina) Facundo Argüello	2	4

=== Top half ===
First round
1	(Argentina) G Pella	6	6
(Brazil) F Romboli	2	0
(Argentina) F Mena	1	3
(Peru) JP Varillas	6	6
(United States) E King	3	6	6
(United States) Evan Song	6	1	3
(United States) S Bangoura	3	3
7	(Dominican Republic) J Hernández-Fernández	6	6
4	(Brazil) J Souza	5	7^{7}	6
(Ecuador) E Gómez	7	6^{2}	0
(Japan) N Nakagawa	2	3
Q	(Brazil) Oscar José Gutierrez	6	6
(Japan) K Uchida	7^{7}	4	3
Q	(Argentina) JI Londero	6^{5}	6	6
WC	(United States) Charles Force	2	3
5	(Portugal) G Elias	6	6

Second round
1	(Argentina) G Pella	6	6
(Peru) JP Varillas	2	1
(United States) E King	6	6
7	(Dominican Republic) J Hernández-Fernández	2	4
4	(Brazil) J Souza	6	6
Q	(Brazil) OJ Gutierrez	3	1
Q	(Argentina) JI Londero	6	6^{3}	5
5	(Portugal) G Elias	4	7^{7}	7

Quarterfinals
1	(Argentina) G Pella	7	6
(United States) E King	5	4
4	(Brazil) J Souza	1	3
5	(Portugal) G Elias	6	6

Semifinals
1	(Argentina) G Pella	6	6
5	(Portugal) G Elias	3	3

=== Bottom half ===
First round
8	(Austria) M Linzer	6	6
Q	(Argentina) C Ugo Carabelli	1	2
(Colombia) A González	5	6	6^{6}
(Colombia) A Falla	7	3	7^{8}
(Brazil) N Santos	5	2
(Colombia) DE Galán	7	6
(Argentina) F Argüello	6	6
3	(Chile) N Jarry	4	4
6	(Brazil) G Clezar	6	6
(Zimbabwe) B Lock	3	3
WC	(Colombia) Felipe Ramírez Luna	1	6	1
(Brazil) JP Sorgi	6	4	6
WC	(Colombia) C Salamanca	6	6
WC	(Colombia) Pedro Uribe	1	0
Q	(Chile) G Lama	1	6	6
2	(Dominican Republic) V Estrella Burgos	6	4	3

Second round
8	(Austria) M Linzer	4	6	6
(Colombia) A Falla	6	1	2
(Colombia) DE Galán	2	1
(Argentina) F Argüello	6	6
6	(Brazil) G Clezar	6	6
(Brazil) JP Sorgi	3	4
WC	(Colombia) C Salamanca	4	6	3
Q	(Chile) G Lama	6	3	6

Quarterfinals
8	(Austria) M Linzer	3	4
(Argentina) F Argüello	6	6
6	(Brazil) G Clezar	6	4	4
Q	(Chile) G Lama	2	6	6

Semifinals
(Argentina) F Argüello	6	7^{7}
Q	(Chile) G Lama	0	6^{4}
