= 2026 Kia Open Bucaramanga =

- Date: 23–28 March
- Edition: 10th
- Surface: Clay
- Location: Bucaramanga, Colombia

Champions

Singles
- (Chile) Matías Soto

Doubles
- (Colombia) Juan Sebastián Gómez / (Chile) Matías Soto
- Kia Open Bucaramanga

The 2026 Kia Open Bucaramanga was a professional tennis tournament played on clay courts. It was the tenth edition of the tournament which was part of the 2026 ATP Challenger Tour. It took place in Bucaramanga, Colombia between 23 and 28 March 2026.

== Singles main draw entrants ==
=== Seeds ===
Country	Player	Rank^{1}	Seed
ARG	Guido Iván Justo	280	1
CHI	Matías Soto	323	2
URU	Franco Roncadelli	332	3
ARG	Juan Manuel La Serna	341	4
USA	Garrett Johns	349	5
COL	Adrià Soriano Barrera	373	6
ARG	Luciano Emanuel Ambrogi	402	7
ARG	Juan Estévez	435	8

- ^{1} Rankings as of 16 March 2026.

=== Other entrants ===
The following players received wildcards into the singles main draw:

- (Colombia) Sergio Luis Hernández Ramírez
- (Colombia) Juan Sebastián Osorio
- (Colombia) Frazier Rengifo

The following players received entry from the qualifying draw:

- (Canada) Benjamin Thomas George
- (Peru) Christopher Li
- (Chile) Daniel Antonio Núñez
- (Colombia) Daniel Salazar
- (Chile) Benjamín Torrealba
- (Chile) Nicolás Villalón

== Champions ==
=== Singles ===
- (Chile) Matías Soto def. (Argentina) Guido Iván Justo 6–3, 6–3.

=== Doubles ===
- (Colombia) Juan Sebastián Gómez / (Chile) Matías Soto def. (Ukraine) Vladyslav Orlov / (Colombia) Adrià Soriano Barrera 6–2, 6–4.
