= 2012 Seguros Bolívar Open Bucaramanga – Singles =

Singles
- 2012 Seguros Bolívar Open Bucaramanga

Final
- Champion: (United States) Wayne Odesnik
- Runner-up: (Romania) Adrian Ungur
- Score: 6–1, 7–6^{(7–4)}

Events
Singles	Doubles
- Seguros Bolívar Open Bucaramanga

Éric Prodon was the defending champion, but lost in the semifinals to Wayne Odesnik.

Odesnik then went on to win the title, defeating Adrian Ungur in the final 6–1, 7–6^{(7–4)}.

== Seeds ==
1. (France) Éric Prodon (semifinals)
2. (Italy) Paolo Lorenzi (semifinals)
3. (Argentina) Horacio Zeballos (quarterfinals)
4. (Romania) Adrian Ungur (final)
5. (Argentina) Máximo González (quarterfinals)
6. (United States) Wayne Odesnik (champion)
7. (Chile) Paul Capdeville (second round)
8. (Brazil) Júlio Silva (quarterfinals)

== Draw ==
Key

- Q = Qualifier
- WC = Wild card
- LL = Lucky loser
- Alt = Alternate
- ITF = ITF entry
- PR = Protected ranking
- SR = Special ranking
- SE = Special exempt
- JE = Junior exempt
- JR = Junior Accelerator Programme entrant
- CO = College Accelerator Programme entrant
- NG = Next Gen Accelerator Program entrant
- w/o = Walkover
- r = Retired
- d = Defaulted

=== Finals ===
Semifinals
1	(France) Éric Prodon	5	0
6	(United States) Wayne Odesnik	7	6
4	(Romania) Adrian Ungur	4	6	6
2	(Italy) Paolo Lorenzi	6	3	4

Final
6	(United States) Wayne Odesnik	6	7^{7}
4	(Romania) Adrian Ungur	1	6^{4}

=== Top half ===
First round
1	(France) É Prodon	6	4	6
(Colombia) C Salamanca	3	6	3
(Uruguay) M Felder	6	2	2
(Brazil) G Clezar	3	6	6
(Colombia) A González	7^{7}	6
(Argentina) A Molteni	6^{1}	3
(Argentina) Nicolás Pastor	3	3
8	(Brazil) J Silva	6	6
3	(Argentina) H Zeballos	7	6
WC	(Colombia) Felipe Mantilla	5	1
(Brazil) Tiago Lopes	3	3
(Argentina) F Bagnis	6	6
WC	(Colombia) JS Gómez	4	1
(Brazil) A Ghem	6	6
(Brazil) R Hocevar	4	5
6	(United States) W Odesnik	6	7

Second round
1	(France) É Prodon	6	7
(Brazil) G Clezar	4	5
(Colombia) A González	5	2
8	(Brazil) J Silva	7	6
3	(Argentina) H Zeballos	6	6
(Argentina) F Bagnis	4	4
(Brazil) A Ghem	4	3
6	(United States) W Odesnik	6	6

Quarterfinals
1	(France) É Prodon	3	6	7
8	(Brazil) J Silva	6	1	5
3	(Argentina) H Zeballos	3	4
6	(United States) W Odesnik	6	6

Semifinals
1	(France) É Prodon	5	0
6	(United States) W Odesnik	7	6

=== Bottom half ===
First round
7	(Chile) P Capdeville	6	6
Q	(Peru) M Echazú	3	2
Q	(Argentina) M Trungelliti	0	7	4
(Colombia) E Struvay	6	5	6
(France) J Eysseric	6	6
WC	(Chile) M Sborowitz	0	3
Q	(Peru) D Beretta	7	4	1
4	(Romania) A Ungur	5	6	6
5/WC	(Argentina) M González	6	6
(Brazil) C Zampieri	3	3
(Dominican Republic) V Estrella	7	6^{4}	0
(Argentina) M Alund	5	7^{7}	6
Q	(Brazil) T Alves	6^{4}	1
(Spain) I Navarro	7^{7}	6
(Portugal) G Elias	2	2
2	(Italy) P Lorenzi	6	6

Second round
7	(Chile) P Capdeville	4	6	6^{5}
(Colombia) E Struvay	6	4	7^{7}
(France) J Eysseric	4	1
4	(Romania) A Ungur	6	6
5/WC	(Argentina) M González	6	6
(Argentina) M Alund	4	0
(Spain) I Navarro	2	2
2	(Italy) P Lorenzi	6	6

Quarterfinals
(Colombia) E Struvay	3	2
4	(Romania) A Ungur	6	6
5/WC	(Argentina) M González	5	6	1
2	(Italy) P Lorenzi	7	3	6

Semifinals
4	(Romania) A Ungur	4	6	6
2	(Italy) P Lorenzi	6	3	4
