= 2015 Claro Open Bucaramanga – Singles =

Singles
- 2015 Claro Open Bucaramanga

Final
- Champion: (Spain) Daniel Gimeno Traver
- Runner-up: (Portugal) Gastão Elias
- Score: 6–3, 1–6, 7–5

Events
Singles	Doubles
- Claro Open Bucaramanga

Alejandro Falla was the defending champion, but lost in the quarterfinals to Jordi Samper Montaña.

Daniel Gimeno Traver won the title, defeating Gastão Elias 6–3, 1–6, 7–5 in the final.

== Seeds ==
1. (Italy) Paolo Lorenzi (second round)
2. (Dominican Republic) Víctor Estrella Burgos (quarterfinals)
3. (Austria) Andreas Haider-Maurer (quarterfinals)
4. (Colombia) Alejandro Falla (quarterfinals)
5. (Spain) Albert Montañés (second round)
6. (Colombia) Alejandro González (first round)
7. (Spain) Daniel Gimeno Traver (champion)
8. (Brazil) João Souza (second round)

== Draw ==
Key

- Q = Qualifier
- WC = Wild card
- LL = Lucky loser
- Alt = Alternate
- ITF = ITF entry
- PR = Protected ranking
- SR = Special ranking
- SE = Special exempt
- JE = Junior exempt
- JR = Junior Accelerator Programme entrant
- CO = College Accelerator Programme entrant
- NG = Next Gen Accelerator Program entrant
- w/o = Walkover
- r = Retired
- d = Defaulted

=== Finals ===
Semifinals
(Portugal) Gastão Elias	6	7^{7}
(Spain) Jordi Samper Montaña	4	6^{5}
(Argentina) Facundo Bagnis	4	7^{7}	3
7	(Spain) Daniel Gimeno Traver	6	6^{5}	6

Final
(Portugal) Gastão Elias	3	6	5
7	(Spain) Daniel Gimeno Traver	6	1	7

=== Top half ===
First round
1	(Italy) P Lorenzi	6^{9}	6	6
(Chile) G Lama	7^{11}	4	3
Q	(Dominican Republic) J Hernández	7	4	1
(Austria) G Melzer	5	6	6
(Spain) R Carballés Baena	7	6
(Spain) I Cervantes	5	4
(Portugal) G Elias	6	6
6/WC	(Colombia) A González	1	4
4	(Colombia) A Falla	4	6	6
(Brazil) F de Paula	6	3	0
(Chile) N Jarry	3	3
(Russia) E Donskoy	6	6
WC	(United States) K Kim	1	3
(Spain) J Samper Montaña	6	6
Q	(Uruguay) M Cuevas	2	2
8	(Brazil) J Souza	6	6

Second round
1	(Italy) P Lorenzi	4	6	3
(Austria) G Melzer	6	3	6
(Spain) R Carballés Baena	5	2
(Portugal) G Elias	7	6
4	(Colombia) A Falla	6	7^{7}
(Russia) E Donskoy	2	6^{5}
(Spain) J Samper Montaña	7^{7}	6
8	(Brazil) J Souza	6^{5}	4

Quarterfinals
(Austria) G Melzer	1	6	2
(Portugal) G Elias	6	3	6
4	(Colombia) A Falla	2	1
(Spain) J Samper Montaña	6	6

Semifinals
(Portugal) G Elias	6	7^{7}
(Spain) J Samper Montaña	4	6^{5}

=== Bottom half ===
First round
5	(Spain) A Montañés	6	0
(Argentina) JI Londero	4	0^{r}
(Brazil) A Ghem	3	2
(Argentina) F Bagnis	6	6
(Argentina) G Pella	6	6
(Argentina) F Argüello	4	3
(Australia) J Kubler	6	3	3
3	(Austria) A Haider-Maurer	1	6	6
7	(Spain) D Gimeno Traver	6	6
(France) G Mina	2	4
(Spain) A Menéndez Maceiras	4	6	6
Q	(Bolivia) H Dellien	6	2	3
Q	(Brazil) G Clezar	6	3	4
WC	(Colombia) E Struvay	3	6	6
WC	(Colombia) Pedro Pablo Ruiz	3	3
2	(Dominican Republic) V Estrella Burgos	6	6

Second round
5	(Spain) A Montañés	4	3
(Argentina) F Bagnis	6	6
(Argentina) G Pella	3	5
3	(Austria) A Haider-Maurer	6	7
7	(Spain) D Gimeno Traver	6	7
(Spain) A Menéndez Maceiras	3	5
WC	(Colombia) E Struvay	3	6^{3}
2	(Dominican Republic) V Estrella Burgos	6	7^{7}

Quarterfinals
(Argentina) F Bagnis	1	7	6
3	(Austria) A Haider-Maurer	6	5	3
7	(Spain) D Gimeno Traver	6	6
2	(Dominican Republic) V Estrella Burgos	0	4

Semifinals
(Argentina) F Bagnis	4	7^{7}	3
7	(Spain) D Gimeno Traver	6	6^{5}	6
