= 2014 Bucaramanga Open =

- Date: 20 – 26 January
- Edition: 6th
- Draw: 32S / 16D
- Prize money: $40,000+H
- Surface: Clay
- Location: Bucaramanga, Colombia

Champions

Singles
- (Colombia) Alejandro Falla

Doubles
- (Colombia) Juan Sebastián Cabal / (Colombia) Robert Farah
- Bucaramanga Open

The 2014 Bucaramanga Open was a professional tennis tournament played on hard courts. It was the fifth edition of the tournament which was part of the 2014 ATP Challenger Tour. It took place in Bucaramanga, Colombia, between 20 and 26 January 2014.

== Singles main draw entrants ==
=== Seeds ===
Country	Player	Rank^{1}	Seed
COL	Alejandro González	75	1
COL	Alejandro Falla	87	2
ARG	Guido Pella	107	3
ITA	Paolo Lorenzi	115	4
BRA	João Souza	116	5
ARG	Diego Sebastián Schwartzman	118	6
ARG	Facundo Argüello	120	7
ESP	Pere Riba	124	8

- ^{1} Rankings are as of January 13, 2014.

=== Other entrants ===
The following players received wildcards into the singles main draw:

- (Colombia) Nicolás Barrientos
- (Colombia) Felipe Mantilla
- (Spain) Pere Riba
- (Colombia) Juan Carlos Spir

The following players received entry from the qualifying draw:

- (Bolivia) Hugo Dellien
- (Guatemala) Christopher Díaz Figueroa
- (Chile) Christian Garin
- (Colombia) Eduardo Struvay

== Champions ==
=== Singles ===
- (Colombia) Alejandro Falla def. (Italy) Paolo Lorenzi, 7–5, 6–1

=== Doubles ===
- (Colombia) Juan Sebastián Cabal / (Colombia) Robert Farah def. (United States) Kevin King / (Colombia) Juan-Carlos Spir, 7–6^{(7–3)}, 6–3
