= 2012 Seguros Bolívar Open Bucaramanga =

Tennis tournament

- Date: 23–29 January
- Edition: 4th
- Location: Bucaramanga, Colombia

Champions

Singles
- (United States) Wayne Odesnik

Doubles
- (Uruguay) Ariel Behar / (Argentina) Horacio Zeballos
- Seguros Bolívar Open Bucaramanga

The 2012 Seguros Bolívar Open Bucaramanga was a professional tennis tournament played on clay courts. It was the fourth edition of the tournament which was part of the 2012 ATP Challenger Tour. It took place in Bucaramanga, Colombia between 23 and 29 January 2012.

== ATP entrants ==
=== Seeds ===
Country	Player	Rank^{1}	Seed
FRA	Éric Prodon	96	1
ITA	Paolo Lorenzi	109	2
ARG	Horacio Zeballos	111	3
ROU	Adrian Ungur	116	4
ARG	Máximo González	124	5
USA	Wayne Odesnik	128	6
CHI	Paul Capdeville	130	7
BRA	Júlio Silva	151	8

- Rankings are as of January 16, 2012.

=== Other entrants ===
The following players received wildcards into the singles main draw:

- (Colombia) Juan Sebastián Gómez
- (Argentina) Máximo González
- (Colombia) Felipe Mantilla
- (Chile) Matías Sborowitz

The following players received entry from the qualifying draw:

- (Brazil) Thiago Alves
- (Peru) Duilio Beretta
- (Peru) Mauricio Echazú
- (Argentina) Marco Trungelliti

== Champions ==
=== Singles ===
(United States) Wayne Odesnik def. (Romania) Adrian Ungur 6–1, 7–6^{(7–4)}

=== Doubles ===
(Uruguay) Ariel Behar / (Argentina) Horacio Zeballos def. (Spain) Miguel Ángel López Jaén / (Italy) Paolo Lorenzi, 6–4, 7–6^{(7–5)}
