= Carlos Avellán =

Ecuadorian tennis player (born 1982)

- Country (sports): Ecuador
- Born: 31 May 1982 (age 43)
- Plays: Right-handed
- Prize money: $66,060

Singles
- Career record: 7–8 (Davis Cup)
- Highest ranking: No. 306 (5 January 2009)

Doubles
- Career record: 6–4 (Davis Cup)
- Highest ranking: No. 401 (5 March 2007)

Carlos Avellán (born 31 May 1982) is an Ecuadorian former professional tennis player.

A native of Guayaquil, Avellán made his debut for the Ecuador Davis Cup team in 2002 and broke through for his first ITF Futures title the following year. During his career he won four ITF Futures titles for singles and earned a career high ranking of 306. He made his last Davis Cup appearance in 2009, retiring with nine singles and six doubles wins.

== ITF Futures titles ==
=== Singles: (4) ===
No.	Date	Tournament	Surface	Opponent	Score
1.	Jul 2003	Ecuador F2, Guayaquil	Clay	(Bolivia) Javier Taborga	1–6, 6–4, 7–6^{(6)}
2.	Sep 2006	Venezuela F4, Pampatar	Clay	(Ecuador) Julio-Cesar Campozano	6–1, 6–0
3.	Aug 2008	Ecuador F2, Guayaquil	Hard	(Italy) Luigi D'Agord	7–6^{(3)}, 7–6^{(5)}
4.	Aug 2008	Ecuador F3, Guayaquil	Hard	(Italy) Luigi D'Agord	7–5, 6–0

=== Doubles: (3) ===
No.	Date	Tournament	Surface	Partner	Opponents	Score
1.	Sep 2006	Venezuela F4, Pampatar	Clay	(Ecuador) Julio César Campozano	(Peru) Mauricio Echazú (Colombia) Sergio Ramírez	7–6^{(0)}, 6–4
2.	Jan 2007	Colombia F1, Manizales	Clay	(Argentina) Diego Álvarez	(Colombia) Juan Sebastián Cabal (Colombia) Carlos Salamanca	1–6, 6–3, 7–6^{(6)}
3.	May 2008	Italy F12, Vicenza	Clay	(Chile) Jorge Aguilar	(Italy) Giancarlo Petrazzuolo (Italy) Walter Trusendi	7–6^{(2)}, 6–4

== See also ==
- List of Ecuador Davis Cup team representatives
