= Diego Álvarez (tennis) =

Argentine tennis player (born 1980)

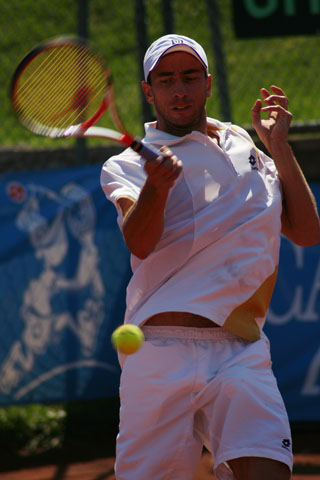
- Country (sports): Argentina
- Born: 6 March 1980 (age 46) Bahía Blanca, Argentina
- Height: 1.85 m (6 ft 1 in)
- Turned pro: 1998
- Retired: 2011
- Plays: Right Handed
- Prize money: $139,675

Singles
- Career record: 0-0 (ATP Tour level, Grand Slam level, and Davis Cup)
- Career titles: 0; 0 Challenger, 2 Futures
- Highest ranking: No. 216 (24 August 2009)

Grand Slam singles results
- Australian Open: Q1 (2009)
- French Open: Q1 (2009)
- Wimbledon: Q1 (2009)
- US Open: Q1 (2009)

Doubles
- Career record: 0-0 (ATP Tour level, Grand Slam level, and Davis Cup)
- Career titles: 0; 2 Challenger, 21 Futures
- Highest ranking: 143 (23 November 2009)
- Last updated on: 27 May 2021.

Diego Álvarez (Latin American Spanish: [ˈdjeɣo ˈalβaɾes]; born 6 March 1980) is an Argentine tennis player. He won two doubles ATP Challenger events in Geneva, Switzerland, and Bucaramanga, Colombia, both in 2009.

== ATP Challenger and ITF Futures finals ==
=== Singles: 11 (2–9) ===
Legend ATP Challenger (0–0) ITF Futures (2–9)	Finals by surface Hard (0–1) Clay (2–8) Grass (0–0) Carpet (0–0)

Result	W–L	Date	Tournament	Tier	Surface	Opponent	Score
Loss	0–1	Jun 2002	Slovenia F3, Kranj	Futures	Clay	(Croatia) Ivan Cinkus	2–6, 5–7
Loss	0–2	Mar 2004	Nigeria F2, Benin City	Futures	Hard	(United Kingdom) James Auckland	1–6, 7–5, 5–7
Loss	0–3	Mar 2005	Italy F5, Catania	Futures	Clay	(Argentina) Agustin Tarantino	6–7^{(3–7)}, 2–6
Loss	0–4	May 2005	USA F11, Tampa	Futures	Clay	(Venezuela) José de Armas	6–2, 3–6, 5–7
Loss	0–5	May 2007	Great Britain F10, Edinburgh	Futures	Clay	(France) Éric Prodon	6–7^{(5–7)}, 3–6
Loss	0–6	Jan 2008	Colombia F1, Manizales	Futures	Clay	(Argentina) Diego Veronelli	1–6, 2–6
Loss	0–7	May 2008	Great Britain F8, Edinburgh	Futures	Clay	(Italy) Alessandro da Col	4–6, 1–6
Loss	0–8	Jul 2008	Argentina F6, Villa María	Futures	Clay	(Argentina) Marco Trungelliti	6–7^{(3–7)}, 3–6
Win	1–8	Oct 2008	Chile F3, Santiago	Futures	Clay	(Latvia) Deniss Pavlovs	7–5, 6–2
Loss	1–9	Dec 2008	Argentina F17, San Miguel de Tucumán	Futures	Clay	(Argentina) Alejandro Fabbri	5–7, 6–2, 0–6
Win	2–9	Aug 2010	Bulgaria F4, Sofia	Futures	Clay	(Sweden) Michael Ryderstedt	6–4, 6–3

=== Doubles: 43 (23–20) ===
Legend ATP Challenger (2–1) ITF Futures (21–19)	Finals by surface Hard (1–1) Clay (22–19) Grass (0–0) Carpet (0–0)

Result	W–L	Date	Tournament	Tier	Surface	Partner	Opponents	Score
Loss	0–1	Aug 1999	Italy F15, Jesi	Futures	Clay	(Italy) Nahuel Fracassi	(Argentina) Daniel Caracciolo (Argentina) Fernando Las Heras	6–7, 6–2, 3–6
Loss	0–2	Aug 1999	Italy F16, Trani	Futures	Clay	(Italy) Nahuel Fracassi	(Brazil) Rodrigo Monte (Brazil) Otavio Rovati	6–1, 5–7, 5–7
Loss	0–3	Sep 2000	Romania F2, Bucharest	Futures	Clay	(Spain) Rubén Ramírez Hidalgo	(Italy) Leonardo Azzaro (Italy) Fabio Maggi	5–7, 4–6
Win	1–3	May 2001	Italy F1, Tortoreto	Futures	Clay	(Italy) Nahuel Fracassi	(Italy) Gianluca Bazzica (Italy) Alessandro da Col	6–2, 6–3
Loss	1–4	May 2001	Italy F4, Viterbo	Futures	Clay	(Italy) Nahuel Fracassi	(Italy) Tomas Tenconi (Brazil) Eduardo Frick	2–4 ret.
Win	2–4	Jun 2001	Italy F6, Verona	Futures	Clay	(Italy) Nahuel Fracassi	(France) Julien Jeanpierre (Italy) Stefano Cobolli	4–1 ret.
Loss	2–5	Sep 2001	Ukraine F1, Gorlivka	Futures	Clay	(Spain) Francesc Lleal-Garres	(Croatia) Ivan Cinkus (Hungary) Gergely Kisgyörgy	2–6, 3–6
Win	3–5	Jul 2002	Romania F2, Bucharest	Futures	Clay	(Russia) Ivan Syrov	(Greece) Alexandros Jakupovic (Greece) Nikos Rovas	6–3, 6–7^{(4–7)}, 6–3
Loss	3–6	Sep 2002	Czech Republic F4, Přerov	Futures	Clay	(Italy) Nahuel Fracassi	(Czech Republic) Pavel Šnobel (Czech Republic) Jaroslav Pospíšil	2–6, 5–7
Win	4–6	Dec 2003	Iran F4, Kish Island	Futures	Clay	(Italy) Leonardo Azzaro	(Austria) Martin Slanar (Austria) Herbert Wiltschnig	1–6, 6–3, 6–1
Win	5–6	Feb 2004	Nigeria F1, Benin City	Futures	Hard	(Italy) Leonardo Azzaro	(Togo) Jean-Kome Loglo (Togo) Komlavi Loglo	6–4, 6–3
Loss	5–7	May 2004	Italy F8, Verona	Futures	Clay	(Chile) Juan-Felipe Yáñez	(Italy) Simone Bolelli (Italy) Alberto Brizzi	3–6, 2–6
Loss	5–8	Jul 2004	France F10, Bourg-en-Bresse	Futures	Clay	(Italy) Giuseppe Menga	(Argentina) Brian Dabul (Algeria) Lamine Ouahab	4–6, 3–6
Win	6–8	Jul 2004	France F11, Saint-Gervais	Futures	Clay	(Argentina) Brian Dabul	(France) Nicolas Tourte (France) Xavier Audouy	3–6, 6–3, 7–5
Loss	6–9	Apr 2005	Italy F9, Bergamo	Futures	Clay	(Argentina) Diego Junqueira	(Italy) Alessandro Motti (Italy) Flavio Cipolla	3–6, 2–6
Loss	6–10	Jul 2005	France F11, Saint-Gervais	Futures	Clay	(France) Xavier Audouy	(France) Antoine Benneteau (France) Patrice Atias	3–6, 7–6^{(7–5)}, 5–7
Win	7–10	Sep 2005	Netherlands F3, Alphen aan den Rijn	Futures	Clay	(Estonia) Mait Künnap	(Netherlands) Jasper Smit (Italy) Alessandro Motti	4–6, 6–4, 6–2
Win	8–10	Oct 2005	Spain F30, Sant Cugat del Vallès	Futures	Clay	(Argentina) Guillermo Carry	(Spain) Antonio Baldellou-Esteva (Spain) Germán Puentes-Alcaniz	4–6, 6–2, 6–4
Win	9–10	Nov 2005	Spain F31, Vilafranca	Futures	Clay	(Argentina) Guillermo Carry	(Spain) Andreu Guilera-Jover (Spain) Jordi Marse-Vidri	6–1, 6–1
Loss	9–11	Jan 2006	Colombia F1, Manizales	Futures	Clay	(Argentina) Emiliano Redondi	(Argentina) Horacio Zeballos (Uruguay) Pablo Cuevas	4–6, 6–7^{(2–7)}
Win	10–11	Jun 2006	Italy F16, Cesena	Futures	Clay	(Italy) Alessandro Motti	(Italy) Marco Crugnola (Italy) Francesco Piccari	7–6^{(7–4)}, 3–6, 6–1
Loss	10–12	Sep 2006	Italy F29, Piombino	Futures	Hard	(Italy) Manuel Jorquera	(France) Thomas Oger (France) Nicolas Tourte	2–6, 7–6^{(7–2)}, 4–6
Loss	10–13	Oct 2006	Spain F35, Sant Cugat	Futures	Clay	(Spain) Carles Poch Gradin	(Spain) David Marrero (Spain) Miguel Ángel López Jaén	4–6, 2–6
Win	11–13	Nov 2006	Spain F36, Vilafranca	Futures	Clay	(Spain) Carles Poch Gradin	(Spain) David Marrero (Spain) Miguel Ángel López Jaén	7–6^{(7–2)}, 6–3
Win	12–13	Jan 2007	Colombia F1, Manizales	Futures	Clay	(Ecuador) Carlos Avellán	(Colombia) Juan Sebastián Cabal (Colombia) Carlos Salamanca	1–6, 6–3, 7–6^{(8–6)}
Win	13–13	Aug 2007	Italy F28, Padua	Futures	Clay	(Argentina) Diego Junqueira	(Slovenia) Andrej Kračman (Italy) Enrico Zen	6–4, 6–2
Win	14–13	Sep 2007	Italy F30, Torre del Greco	Futures	Clay	(Italy) Enrico Burzi	(Argentina) Marcelo Charpentier (Italy) Matteo Volante	7–6^{(7–4)}, 6–4
Win	15–13	Nov 2007	Spain F42, Barcelona	Futures	Clay	(Greece) Alexandros Jakupovic	(Georgia (country)) Nodar Itonishvili (Morocco) Younès Rachidi	6–3, 6–3
Loss	15–14	Feb 2008	Colombia F2, Bucaramanga	Futures	Clay	(Argentina) Juan-Pablo Amado	(Colombia) Michael Quintero (Colombia) Carlos Salamanca	3–6, 6–2, [8–10]
Loss	15–15	May 2008	Great Britain F8, Edinburgh	Futures	Clay	(Italy) Federico Torresi	(United Kingdom) Dan Evans (United Kingdom) Joshua Milton	2–6, 2–6
Win	16–15	May 2008	Italy F13, Naples	Futures	Clay	(Argentina) Lionel Noviski	(Spain) Miquel Perez Puigdomenech (Argentina) Jonathan Gonzalia	7–6^{(7–4)}, 6–1
Win	17–15	Jul 2008	Argentina F6, Villa María	Futures	Clay	(Argentina) Guillermo Carry	(Argentina) Martín Alund (Argentina) Antonio Pastorino	7–5, 6–1
Loss	17–16	Aug 2008	Italy F26, Bolzano	Futures	Clay	(New Zealand) Daniel King-Turner	(Italy) Thomas Fabbiano (Italy) Antonio Comporto	1–6, 6–7^{(4–7)}
Loss	17–17	Nov 2008	Brazil F29, São Paulo	Futures	Clay	(France) Benjamin Dracos	(Brazil) Rodrigo Guidolin (Brazil) Rafael Camilo	3–6, 3–6
Win	18–17	Feb 2009	Bucaramanga, Colombia	Challenger	Clay	(Spain) Carles Poch Gradin	(Brazil) Eric Gomes (Ecuador) Carlos Avellán	7–6^{(9–7)}, 6–1
Loss	18–18	Apr 2009	Italy F5, Viterbo	Futures	Clay	(Spain) Guillermo Olaso	(Italy) Stefano Valenti (Italy) Thomas Fabbiano	3–6, 2–6
Win	19–18	Aug 2009	Geneva, Switzerland	Challenger	Clay	(Argentina) Juan-Martín Aranguren	(Austria) Philipp Oswald (Finland) Henri Laaksonen	6–4, 4–6, [10–2]
Loss	19–19	Sep 2009	Bogotá, Colombia	Challenger	Clay	(Argentina) Sebastián Decoud	(Colombia) Alejandro Falla (Colombia) Alejandro González	7–5, 4–6, [8–10]
Loss	19–20	Apr 2010	Italy F3, Foggia	Futures	Clay	(Argentina) Agustin Picco	(Italy) Alessio di Mauro (Italy) Simone Vagnozzi	4–6, 0–6
Win	20–20	Aug 2010	Germany F11, Wetzlar	Futures	Clay	(Argentina) Juan-Martín Aranguren	(Germany) Andre Begemann (Czech Republic) Radek Zahraj	6–4, 6–2
Win	21–20	Aug 2010	Bulgaria F5, Bourgas	Futures	Clay	(Italy) Federico Torresi	(North Macedonia) Tomislav Jotovski (Serbia) Miljan Zekić	6–4, 6–2
Win	22–20	Feb 2011	Colombia F1, Cúcuta	Futures	Clay	(Argentina) Martín Alund	(Colombia) Eduardo Struvay (Colombia) Alejandro González	6–4, 6–4
Win	23–20	Apr 2011	Argentina F2, Villa María	Futures	Clay	(Chile) Cristóbal Saavedra Corvalán	(Argentina) Guillermo Durán (Argentina) Alejandro Kon	4–6, 7–5, [10–7]

== Sources ==
- Diego Álvarez at the Association of Tennis Professionals
- Diego Álvarez at World Tennis
