= Pablo Galdón =

Argentine tennis player

Pablo Cesar Galdón
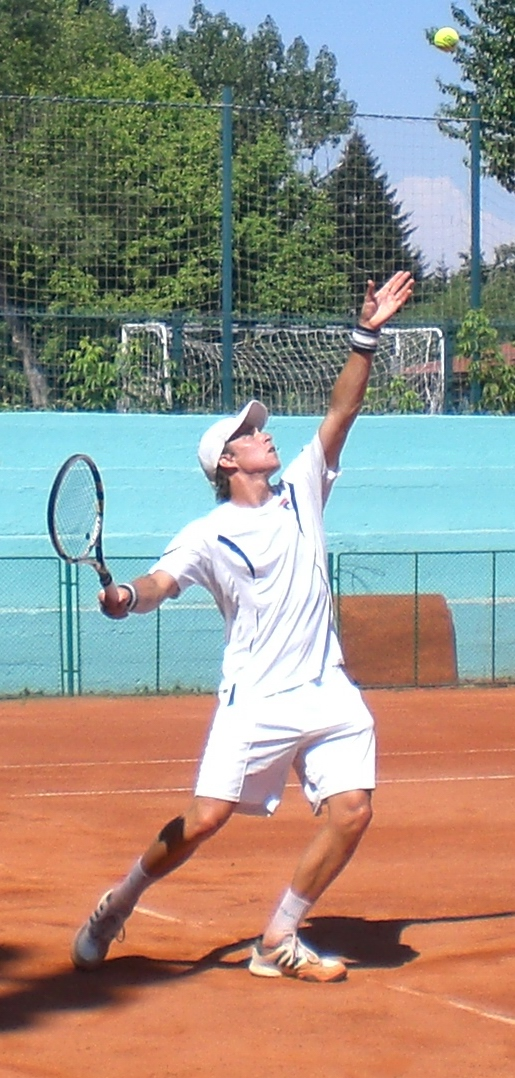
- Country (sports): Argentina
- Residence: Gálvez, Santa Fe, Argentina
- Born: 28 November 1985 (age 40) Gálvez, Santa Fe, Argentina
- Turned pro: 2003
- Plays: Right-handed (two-handed backhand)
- Prize money: US $131,555

Singles
- Career record: 0–1
- Career titles: 0
- Highest ranking: No. 222 (4 July 2011)

Grand Slam singles results
- Wimbledon: Q1 (2012)
- US Open: Q2 (2011)

Doubles
- Career record: 0–0
- Career titles: 0
- Highest ranking: No. 231 (01 August 2011)

Pablo César Galdón (Latin American Spanish: [ˈpaβlo ˈsesaɾ ɣalˈdon]; (Note: In isolation, Galdón is pronounced [ɡalˈdon].) born 28 November 1985) is an Argentine professional tennis player. His favorite surface is clay.

== Career ==
Galdón enjoyed much success on ITF Futures circuit. Unfortunately, he struggled to make an impact at higher levels.

He never progressed further than the QF stage at any ATP Challenger event, having reached this stage on multiple occasions:

1) 2010, Cali, Colombia l. Juan Sebastián Cabal 3-6 4–6

2) 2010, Asunción, Paraguay l. Nikola Ćirić 3-6 4–6

3) 2011, São José do Rio Preto, Brazil l. Thiago Alves 6-4 3-6 4–6

4) 2011, Guayaquil, Ecuador l.Pedro Sousa 6-0 5-7 6–7

5) 2012, Oberstaufen, Germany l. Guillaume Rufin 3-6 6-1 6–7

6) 2013, San Juan, Argentina l. Diego Schwartzman 3-6 0–6

His sole ATP main draw appearance came in Buenos Aires, Argentina in 2011, fighting through three qualifying rounds against Adrian Ungur, Facundo Bagnis and Giovanni Lapentti. He finally fell to then world number 13 Nicolás Almagro 1-6 2–6.

== ATP tournaments finals ==
=== Titles (9) ===
Legend
ITF Futures Tournament (9)

No.	Date	Tournament	Surface	Opponent in the final	Score in the final
1.	8 August 2005	Romania F15, Romania	Clay	(Spain) César Ferrer-Victoria	6–2, 6–1
2.	24 September 2007	Argentina F16, Argentina	Clay	(Argentina) Antonio Pastorino	6–2, 3–6, 5–4 RET
3.	19 May 2008	Argentina F3, Argentina	Clay	(Argentina) Alejandro Kon	6–1, 2–6, 6–2
4.	23 June 2008	Argentina F5, Argentina	Clay	(Argentina) Martín Alund	3–6, 6–4, 6–4
5.	7 July 2008	Paraguay F1, Paraguay	Clay	(Brazil) Alexandre Bonatto	4–6, 6–2, 6–3
6.	19 October 2009	Argentina F20, Argentina	Clay	(United States) Andrea Collarini	7–6^{(7–1)}, 6–7^{(5–7)}, 7–5
7.	28 June 2010	Argentina F11, Argentina	Clay	(Argentina) Andrés Molteni	7–6^{(7–4)}, 6–4
8.	5 July 2010	Argentina F12, Argentina	Clay	(Argentina) Joaquín-Jésus Monteferrario	6–2, 7–6^{(7–5)}
9.	9 August 2010	Argentina F16, Argentina	Clay	(Argentina) Guillermo Durán	6–0, 6–4

=== Runner-Up (4) ===
No.	Date	Tournament	Surface	Opponent in the final	Score in the final
1.	31 October 2005	Chile F5, Chile	Clay	(Chile) Guillermo Hormazábal	6–7^{(4–7)}, 5–7
2.	14 September 2009	Argentina F15, Argentina	Clay	(Argentina) Antonio Pastorino	1–6, 4–6
3.	5 October 2009	Argentina F18, Argentina	Clay	(Argentina) Diego Cristín	3–6, 6–7^{(4–7)}
4.	2 August 2010	Argentina F15, Argentina	Clay	(Argentina) Facundo Argüello	1–6, 4–6
