= Sergio Galdós =

Peruvian tennis player

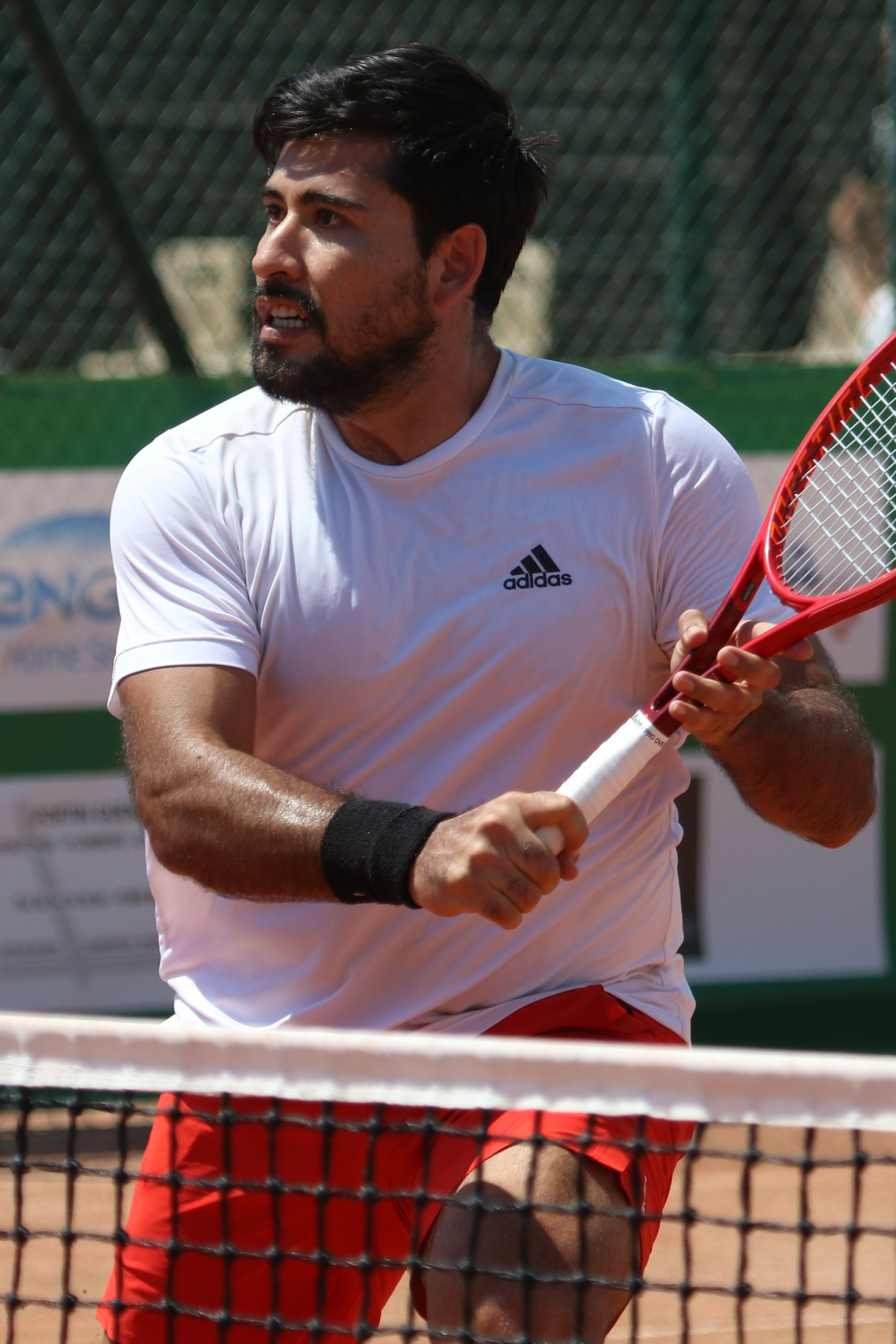
- Galdós at the 2022 Internationaux de Tennis de Blois
- Country (sports): Peru
- Residence: Lima, Peru
- Born: January 2, 1990 (age 36) Arequipa, Peru
- Height: 1.80 m (5 ft 11 in)
- Turned pro: 2008
- Retired: 2022
- Plays: Right-handed (one-handed backhand)
- Coach: Matias O'Neille
- Prize money: US $172,333

Singles
- Career record: 5–1
- Career titles: 0
- Highest ranking: No. 590 (11 June 2012)

Doubles
- Career record: 16–16
- Career titles: 0; 10 Challengers, 16 Futures
- Highest ranking: No. 80 (28 November 2016)

Grand Slam doubles results
- Wimbledon: Q1 (2018)
Medal record
Representing Peru
Men's Tennis
Pan American Games
Bronze medal – third place	2019 Lima	Men's Doubles
Bronze medal – third place	2019 Lima	Mixed Doubles
Bolivarian Games
Silver medal – second place	2013 Trujillo	Men's Nations Cup
Bronze medal – third place	2013 Trujillo	Men's Doubles

Sergio Galdós (Spanish pronunciation: [ˈseɾxjo ɣalˈdos]; (Note: In isolation, Galdós is pronounced [ɡalˈdos].) born January 2, 1990) is a former Peruvian tennis player. He is a regular member of the Peruvian Davis Cup team. In 2016 he broke into the top 100 of the men's doubles rankings for the first time finishing the year ranked No. 80 in the world on 28 November 2016.

== Personal Info ==
Galdós is sponsored by Joma.

== ATP career finals ==
=== Doubles ===
Winner – Legend Grand Slam tournaments (0–0) ATP World Tour Finals (0–0) ATP World Tour Masters 1000 (0–0) ATP World Tour 500 Series (0–0) ATP World Tour 250 Series (0–1)	Finals by surface Hard (0–0) Clay (0–1) Grass (0–0)

Outcome	W–L	Date	Tournament	Surface	Partner	Opponents	Score
Runner-up	0–1	Aug 2017	Los Cabos Open, Cabo San Lucas, Mexico	Hard	(Venezuela) Roberto Maytín	(Colombia) Juan Sebastián Cabal (Philippines) Treat Huey	2–6, 3–6

== Challenger and Futures finals ==
=== Singles: 2 (0–2) ===
Legend (singles) ATP Challenger Tour (0–0) ITF Futures Tour (0–2)	Titles by surface Hard (0–0) Clay (0–2) Grass (0–0) Carpet (0–0)

Result	W–L	Date	Tournament	Tier	Surface	Opponent	Score
Loss	0–1	Oct 2011	Bolivia F3, Santa Cruz	Futures	Clay	(Spain) Enrique López Pérez	1–6, 4–6
Loss	0–2	Apr 2012	Argentina F8, Neuquén	Futures	Clay	(Argentina) Federico Coria	6–4, 1–6, 6–7^{(6–8)}

=== Doubles: 67 (30–37) ===
Legend (doubles) ATP Challenger Tour (14–24) ITF Futures Tour (16–13)	Titles by surface Hard (2–3) Clay (28–34) Grass (0–0) Carpet (0–0)

Result	W–L	Date	Tournament	Tier	Surface	Partner	Opponents	Score
Win	1–0	Aug 2007	Peru F3, Arequipa	Futures	Clay	(Argentina) Facundo Bagnis	(Colombia) Francisco Franco (Peru) Matías Silva	6–4, 7–6^{(9–7)}
Loss	1–1	Jul 2008	Peru F3, Trujillo	Futures	Clay	(Argentina) Guido Pella	(Peru) Mauricio Echazú (Peru) Matías Silva	6–2, 1–6, [7–10]
Loss	1–2	Nov 2009	Chile F5, Santiago	Futures	Clay	(Peru) Duilio Beretta	(Bolivia) Mauricio Doria-Medina (Bolivia) Federico Zeballos	4–6, 4–6
Win	2–2	Dec 2009	Peru F3, Lima	Futures	Clay	(Argentina) Leandro Migani	(Bolivia) Mauricio Doria-Medina (Bolivia) Federico Zeballos	6–4, 6–4
Win	3–2	Sep 2010	Bolivia F1, Tarija	Futures	Clay	(Peru) Mauricio Echazú	(United States) Adam El Mihdawy (Bolivia) Eduardo Kohlberg Ruíz	6–1, 6–4
Loss	3–3	Oct 2010	Bolivia F3, Cochabamba	Futures	Clay	(Peru) Mauricio Echazú	(Bolivia) Mauricio Doria-Medina (Bolivia) Mauricio Estívariz	4–6, 4–6
Loss	3–4	Oct 2010	Bolivia F4, Santa Cruz	Futures	Clay	(Peru) Mauricio Echazú	(Bolivia) Hugo Dellien (Bolivia) Federico Zeballos	1–6, 4–6
Win	4–4	Apr 2011	Chile F2, Santiago	Futures	Clay	(Peru) Duilio Beretta	(Chile) Guillermo Hormazábal (Chile) Rodrigo Pérez	5–7, 7–6^{(7–5)}, [10–5]
Loss	4–5	Apr 2011	Venezuela F1, Valencia	Futures	Hard	(Peru) Mauricio Echazú	(Venezuela) Piero Luisi (Venezuela) Román Recarte	6–4, 3–6, [7–10]
Win	5–5	Aug 2011	Peru F1, Arequipa	Futures	Clay	(Peru) Duilio Beretta	(Uruguay) Martín Cuevas (Argentina) Guido Pella	6–4, 6–0
Win	6–5	Oct 2011	Bolivia F2, Cochabamba	Futures	Clay	(Argentina) Guido Pella	(Bolivia) Mauricio Doria-Medina (Bolivia) Federico Zeballos	6–3, 6–2
Win	7–5	Oct 2011	Bolivia F3, Santa Cruz	Futures	Clay	(Argentina) Guido Pella	(Brazil) Felipe Soares (Brazil) Thales Turini	3–6, 6–2, [10–8]
Loss	7–6	Oct 2011	Bolivia F4, Sucre	Futures	Clay	(Argentina) Guido Pella	(Argentina) Guillermo Carry (Argentina) Joaquín-Jesús Monteferrario	6–7^{(3–7)}, 4–6
Win	8–6	Apr 2012	Argentina F6, Villa María	Futures	Clay	(Argentina) Renzo Olivo	(Argentina) Tomás Lipovšek Puches (Argentina) Juan Pablo Ortiz	1–6, 6–4, [10–4]
Win	9–6	Apr 2012	Argentina F8, Neuquén	Futures	Clay	(Ecuador) Diego Hidalgo	(Chile) Cristóbal Saavedra Corvalán (Chile) Juan Carlos Sáez	3–6, 6–3, [10–6]
Loss	9–7	May 2012	Peru F1, Chosica	Futures	Clay	(Peru) Duilio Beretta	(Brazil) Marcelo Demoliner (Argentina) Renzo Olivo	3–6, 6–7^{(6–8)}
Loss	9–8	Jul 2012	Peru F6, Lima	Futures	Clay	(Peru) Duilio Beretta	(Brazil) Marcelo Demoliner (Argentina) Renzo Olivo	4–6, 3–6
Loss	9–9	Aug 2012	Ecuador F2, Guayaquil	Futures	Hard	(Dominican Republic) José Hernández-Fernández	(Ecuador) Emilio Gómez (Ecuador) Roberto Quiroz	5–7, 2–6
Win	10–9	Sep 2012	Ecuador F3, Quito	Futures	Clay	(Peru) Duilio Beretta	(Peru) Mauricio Echazú (Chile) Guillermo Rivera Aránguiz	6–2, 6–1
Win	11–9	Oct 2012	Bolivia F5, Santa Cruz	Futures	Clay	(Peru) Mauricio Echazú	(Bolivia) Hugo Dellien (Bolivia) Mauricio Doria-Medina	6–3, 6–3
Win	12–9	Dec 2012	Argentina F28, Río Cuarto	Futures	Clay	(Argentina) Mateo Nicolás Martínez	(Argentina) Franco Agamenone (Argentina) José Ángel Carrizo	7–6^{(7–3)}, 6–4
Loss	12–10	Jan 2013	Bucaramanga, Colombia	Challenger	Clay	(Argentina) Marco Trungelliti	(Brazil) Marcelo Demoliner (Croatia) Franko Škugor	6–7^{(8–10)}, 2–6
Win	13–10	Mar 2013	Salinas, Ecuador	Challenger	Clay	(Argentina) Marco Trungelliti	(South Africa) Jean Andersen (South Africa) Izak van der Merwe	6–4, 6–4
Win	14–10	Apr 2013	Panama City, Panama	Challenger	Clay	(Chile) Jorge Aguilar	(Ecuador) Julio César Campozano (Colombia) Alejandro González	6–4, 6–4
Loss	14–11	May 2013	Argentina F4, Villa del Dique	Futures	Clay	(Peru) Duilio Beretta	(Argentina) Gabriel Alejandro Hidalgo (Argentina) Mauricio Pérez Mota	1–6, 1–6
Win	15–11	May 2013	Argentina F5, Villa María	Futures	Clay	(Argentina) Juan-Pablo Amado	(Argentina) Hernán Casanova (Argentina) Juan Ignacio Galarza	6–1, 6–2
Win	16–11	May 2013	Argentina F6, Río Cuarto	Futures	Clay	(Peru) Duilio Beretta	(Argentina) Franco Agamenone (Argentina) José Ángel Carrizo	4–6, 6–4, [10–1]
Loss	16–12	May 2013	Argentina F7, Bell Ville	Futures	Clay	(Peru) Duilio Beretta	(Argentina) Andrea Collarini (Argentina) Guillermo Durán	3–6, 4–6
Win	17–12	Jun 2013	Argentina F8, Arroyito	Futures	Clay	(Peru) Duilio Beretta	(Brazil) Daniel Dutra da Silva (Argentina) Pablo Galdón	6–0, 7–5
Win	18–12	Jul 2013	Manta, Ecuador	Challenger	Hard	(El Salvador) Marcelo Arévalo	(Colombia) Alejandro González (Colombia) Carlos Salamanca	6–3, 6–4
Loss	18–13	Aug 2013	Argentina F15, San Juan	Futures	Clay	(Uruguay) Martín Cuevas	(Argentina) Guillermo Carry (Argentina) Andrés Molteni	1–6, 4–6
Loss	18–14	Aug 2013	Argentina F16, Santiago del Estero	Futures	Clay	(Uruguay) Martín Cuevas	(Argentina) Guillermo Durán (Argentina) Andrés Molteni	7–6^{(7–4)}, 3–6, [11–13]
Loss	18–15	Oct 2013	São Paulo, Brazil	Challenger	Clay	(Argentina) Guido Pella	(Moldova) Roman Borvanov (New Zealand) Artem Sitak	4–6, 6–7^{(3–7)}
Loss	18–16	Nov 2013	Lima, Peru	Challenger	Clay	(Brazil) Marcelo Demoliner	(Argentina) Andrés Molteni (Brazil) Fernando Romboli	4–6, 4–6
Loss	18–17	Jul 2014	San Benedetto, Italy	Challenger	Clay	(Bolivia) Hugo Dellien	(Italy) Daniele Giorgini (Italy) Potito Starace	3–6, 7–6^{(7–3)}, [5–10]
Win	19–17	Sep 2014	Ecuador F6, Ibarra	Futures	Clay	(Argentina) Marco Trungelliti	(United States) Kevin King (Colombia) Juan Carlos Spir	7–6^{(7–5)}, 7–6^{(7–2)}
Win	20–17	Nov 2014	Lima, Peru	Challenger	Clay	(Argentina) Guido Pella	(Brazil) Marcelo Demoliner (Venezuela) Roberto Maytín	6–3, 6–1
Loss	20–18	Apr 2015	San Luis Potosí, Mexico	Challenger	Clay	(Argentina) Guido Pella	(Argentina) Guillermo Durán (Argentina) Horacio Zeballos	6–7^{(4–7)}, 4–6
Loss	20–19	May 2015	São Paulo, Brazil	Challenger	Clay	(Argentina) Guido Andreozzi	(United States) Chase Buchanan (Slovenia) Blaž Rola	4–6, 4–6
Loss	20–20	Jun 2015	Mestre, Italy	Challenger	Clay	(Argentina) Facundo Bagnis	(Italy) Flavio Cipolla (Italy) Potito Starace	7–5, 6–7^{(3–7)}, [4–10]
Win	21–20	Sep 2015	Barranquilla, Colombia	Challenger	Clay	(El Salvador) Marcelo Arévalo	(Peru) Duilio Beretta (Peru) Mauricio Echazú	6–1, 6–4
Loss	21–21	Jan 2016	Buenos Aires, Argentina	Challenger	Clay	(Sweden) Christian Lindell	(Argentina) Facundo Bagnis (Argentina) Máximo González	1–6, 2–6
Loss	21–22	Jan 2016	Bucaramanga, Colombia	Challenger	Clay	(Venezuela) Luis David Martínez	(Chile) Julio Peralta (Argentina) Horacio Zeballos	2–6, 2–6
Loss	21–23	Feb 2016	Morelos, Mexico	Challenger	Hard	(El Salvador) Marcelo Arévalo	(Canada) Philip Bester (Canada) Peter Polansky	4–6, 6–3, [6–10]
Loss	21–24	Apr 2016	Sarasota, USA	Challenger	Clay	(El Salvador) Marcelo Arévalo	(Argentina) Facundo Argüello (Argentina) Nicolás Kicker	6–4, 4–6, [6–10]
Loss	21–25	Jul 2016	San Benedetto, Italy	Challenger	Clay	(Argentina) Facundo Argüello	(Italy) Federico Gaio (Italy) Stefano Napolitano	3–6, 4–6
Win	22–25	Sep 2016	Santos, Brazil	Challenger	Clay	(Argentina) Máximo González	(Brazil) Fabrício Neis (Brazil) Rogério Dutra Silva	6–3, 5–7, [14–12]
Loss	22–26	Oct 2016	Campinas, Brazil	Challenger	Clay	(Argentina) Máximo González	(Argentina) Federico Coria (Argentina) Tomás Lipovšek Puches	5–7, 2–6
Loss	22–27	Oct 2016	Buenos Aires, Argentina	Challenger	Clay	(Brazil) Fernando Romboli	(Chile) Julio Peralta (Argentina) Horacio Zeballos	6–7^{(5–7)}, 6–7^{(1–7)}
Loss	22–28	Oct 2016	Santiago, Chile	Challenger	Clay	(Argentina) Máximo González	(Chile) Julio Peralta (Argentina) Horacio Zeballos	3–6, 4–6
Win	23–28	Oct 2016	Lima, Peru	Challenger	Clay	(Argentina) Leonardo Mayer	(Uruguay) Ariel Behar (Chile) Gonzalo Lama	6–2, 7–6^{(9–7)}
Loss	23–29	Nov 2016	Guayaquil, Ecuador	Challenger	Clay	(El Salvador) Marcelo Arévalo	(Uruguay) Ariel Behar (Brazil) Fabiano de Paula	2–6, 4–6
Win	24–29	Nov 2016	Bogotá, Colombia	Challenger	Clay	(El Salvador) Marcelo Arévalo	(Uruguay) Ariel Behar (Ecuador) Gonzalo Escobar	6–4, 6–1
Win	25–29	Apr 2017	Panama City, Panama	Challenger	Clay	(Brazil) Caio Zampieri	(Germany) Kevin Krawietz (Spain) Adrián Menéndez Maceiras	1–6, 7–6^{(7–5)}, [10–7]
Win	26–29	Aug 2017	Floridablanca, Colombia	Challenger	Clay	(Chile) Nicolás Jarry	(United States) Sekou Bangoura (United States) Evan King	6–3, 5–7, [10–1]
Loss	26–30	Oct 2017	Cali, Colombia	Challenger	Clay	(Brazil) Fabrício Neis	(El Salvador) Marcelo Arévalo (Mexico) Miguel Ángel Reyes-Varela	3–6, 4–6
Loss	26–31	Jul 2018	San Benedetto, Italy	Challenger	Clay	(Bolivia) Federico Zeballos	(Italy) Julian Ocleppo (Italy) Andrea Vavassori	3–6, 2–6
Loss	26–32	Jun 2019	Blois, France	Challenger	Clay	(Sweden) Andreas Siljeström	(France) Corentin Denolly (France) Alexandre Müller	5–7, 7–6^{(7–5)}, [6–10]
Loss	26–33	Jul 2019	San Benedetto, Italy	Challenger	Clay	(Peru) Juan Pablo Varillas	(Croatia) Ivan Sabanov (Croatia) Matej Sabanov	4–6, 6–4, [5–10]
Loss	26–34	Sep 2019	Banja Luka, Bosnia and Herzegovina	Challenger	Clay	(Argentina) Facundo Mena	(France) Sadio Doumbia (France) Fabien Reboul	3–6, 6–7^{(4–7)}
Loss	26–35	Feb 2021	Concepcion, Chile	Challenger	Clay	(Ecuador) Diego Hidalgo	(Brazil) Orlando Luz (Brazil) Rafael Matos	5-7, 4–6
Win	27-35	May 2021	Salinas, Ecuador	Challenger	Hard	(Colombia) Nicolás Barrientos	(Ecuador) Antonio Cayetano March (Argentina) Thiago Agustín Tirante	w/o
Win	28-35	Jun 2021	Forli, Italy	Challenger	Clay	(Brazil) Orlando Luz	(Argentina) Pedro Cachin (Argentina) Camilo Ugo Carabelli	7–5, 2–6, [10–8]
Win	29–35	Jul 2021	Salzburg, Austria	Challenger	Clay	(Argentina) Facundo Bagnis	(United States) Robert Galloway (United States) Alex Lawson	6–0, 6–3
Loss	29–36	Jul 2021	Amersfoort, Netherlands	Challenger	Clay	(Portugal) Gonçalo Oliveira	(Switzerland) Luca Castelnuovo (France) Manuel Guinard	6-0, 4–6, [9-11]
Loss	29-37	Aug 2021	Cordenons, Italy	Challenger	Clay	(Argentina) Renzo Olivo	(Brazil) Orlando Luz (Brazil) Rafael Matos	4-6, 6-7^{(5–7)}
Win	30–37	Oct 2021	Lima, Peru	Challenger	Clay	(Portugal) Gonçalo Oliveira	(Chile) Marcelo Tomás Barrios Vera (Chile) Alejandro Tabilo	6–2, 2–6, [10–5]

== ATP ranking evolution ==
=== Singles ===
Changes in the ranking ATP to the end of the season.

Year	2008	2009	2010
Singles ranking	1568	▲1214	▲824

=== Doubles ===
Changes in the ranking ATP to the end of the season.

Year	2006	2007	2008	2009	2010
Doubles ranking	1476	▲1111	▲937	▲767	▲504
