= Bucaramanga Challenger =

Tennis tournament in Colombia

- 2026 Kia Open Bucaramanga

Tournament information
- Event name: Kia Open Bucaramanga
- Location: Bucaramanga (Floridablanca), Colombia
- Venue: Club Campestre de Bucaramanga
- Category: ATP Challenger Tour
- Surface: Clay (red)
- Draw: 32S/32Q/16D

The Kia Open Bucaramanga (formerly Claro Open Bucaramanga, Claro Open Floridablanca, and Seguros Bolívar Open) is a professional tennis tournament played on outdoor red clay courts. It is part of the ATP Challenger Tour. It is held annually in Bucamaranga (Floridablanca), Colombia, from 2009 until 2017, and it returned on the ATP Challenger calendar in 2026 to Bucaramanga.

== Past finals ==
=== Singles ===
Year	Champion	Runner-up	Score
2009	(Argentina) Horacio Zeballos	(Colombia) Carlos Salamanca	7–5, 6–2
2010	(Argentina) Eduardo Schwank	(Argentina) Juan Pablo Brzezicki	6–4, 6–2
2011	(France) Éric Prodon	(Brazil) Fernando Romboli	6–3, 4–6, 6–1
2012	(United States) Wayne Odesnik	(Romania) Adrian Ungur	6–1, 7–6^{(7–4)}
2013	(Argentina) Federico Delbonis	(United States) Wayne Odesnik	7–6^{(7–4)}, 6–3
2014	(Colombia) Alejandro Falla	(Italy) Paolo Lorenzi	7–5, 6–1
2015	(Spain) Daniel Gimeno Traver	(Portugal) Gastão Elias	6–3, 1–6, 7–5
2016	(Austria) Gerald Melzer	(Italy) Paolo Lorenzi	6–3, 6–1
2017	(Argentina) Guido Pella	(Argentina) Facundo Argüello	6–2, 6–4
2018–2025	Not held		
2026	(Chile) Matías Soto	(Argentina) Guido Iván Justo	6–3, 6–3

=== Doubles ===
Year	Champions	Runners-up	Score
2009	(Argentina) Diego Álvarez (Spain) Carles Poch-Gradin	(Ecuador) Carlos Avellán (Brazil) Eric Gomes	7–6(7), 6–1
2010	(Spain) Pere Riba (Spain) Santiago Ventura	(Brazil) Marcelo Demoliner (Brazil) Rodrigo Guidolin	6–2, 6–2
2011	(Colombia) Juan Sebastián Cabal (Colombia) Robert Farah	(Argentina) Pablo Galdón (Argentina) Andrés Molteni	6–1, 6–2
2012	(Uruguay) Ariel Behar (Argentina) Horacio Zeballos	(Spain) Miguel Ángel López Jaén (Italy) Paolo Lorenzi	6–4, 7–6^{(7–5)}
2013	(Brazil) Marcelo Demoliner (Croatia) Franko Škugor	(Peru) Sergio Galdós (Argentina) Marco Trungelliti	7–6^{(10–8)}, 6–2
2014	(Colombia) Juan Sebastián Cabal (Colombia) Robert Farah	(United States) Kevin King (Colombia) Juan-Carlos Spir	7–6^{(7–3)}, 6–3
2015	(Argentina) Guillermo Durán (Argentina) Andrés Molteni	(Colombia) Nicolás Barrientos (Colombia) Eduardo Struvay	7–5, 6–7^{(8–10)}, [10–0]
2016	(Chile) Julio Peralta (Argentina) Horacio Zeballos	(Peru) Sergio Galdós (Venezuela) Luis David Martínez	6–2, 6–2
2017	(Peru) Sergio Galdós (Chile) Nicolás Jarry	(United States) Sekou Bangoura (United States) Evan King	6–3, 5–7, [10–1]
2018–2025	Not held		
2026	(Colombia) Juan Sebastián Gómez (Chile) Matías Soto	(Ukraine) Vladyslav Orlov (Colombia) Adrià Soriano Barrera	6–2, 6–4
