= 2012 Seguros Bolívar Open Pereira – Singles =

Singles
- 2012 Seguros Bolívar Open Pereira

Final
- Champion: (Colombia) Carlos Salamanca
- Runner-up: (Spain) Rubén Ramírez Hidalgo
- Score: 5–7, 6–2, 6–1

Events
Singles	Doubles
← 2011 ·	Seguros Bolívar Open Pereira	· 2013 →

Paolo Lorenzi was the defending champion but decided not to participate.
Carlos Salamanca won the title, defeating Rubén Ramírez Hidalgo 5–7, 6–2, 6–1 in the final.

== Seeds ==
1. (Colombia) Santiago Giraldo (semifinals)
2. (Colombia) Alejandro Falla (second round, withdrew due to a knee injury)
3. (Spain) Rubén Ramírez Hidalgo (final)
4. (Argentina) Martín Alund (semifinals)
5. (Dominican Republic) Víctor Estrella (first round)
6. (Argentina) Guido Pella (second round)
7. (Colombia) Carlos Salamanca (champion)
8. (Colombia) Eduardo Struvay (first round, retired due to a back injury)

== Draw ==
=== Key ===
- Q = Qualifier
- WC = Wild card
- LL = Lucky loser
- Alt = Alternate
- SE = Special exempt
- PR = Protected ranking
- ITF = ITF entry
- JE = Junior exempt
- w/o = Walkover
- r = Retired
- d = Defaulted
- SR = Special ranking

=== Finals ===
Semifinals
1	(Colombia) Santiago Giraldo	6	6^{4}	4
3	(Spain) Rubén Ramírez Hidalgo	2	7^{7}	6
4	(Argentina) Martín Alund	6	6^{6}	2
7	(Colombia) Carlos Salamanca	2	7^{8}	6

Final
3	(Spain) Rubén Ramírez Hidalgo	7	2	1
7	(Colombia) Carlos Salamanca	5	6	6

=== Top half ===
First round
1	(Colombia) S Giraldo	6	6
(Chile) C Saavedra-Corvalán	3	3
(Brazil) Fabiano de Paula	6	6
WC	(Chile) N Massú	4	4
Q	(Colombia) N Barrientos	3	7^{7}	6
Q	(Ecuador) JC Campozano	6	6^{3}	1
(Brazil) F Romboli	6	6
5	(Dominican Republic) V Estrella	4	4
3	(Spain) R Ramírez Hidalgo	6	6
(Argentina) S Decoud	1	4
(Peru) D Beretta	6	6
WC	(Colombia) Felipe Escobar	3	2
(Argentina) Diego Schwartzmann	2	3
(Colombia) R Farah	6	6
(Colombia) A González	6^{4}	7^{7}	4
6	(Argentina) G Pella	7^{7}	6^{4}	6

Second round
1	(Colombia) S Giraldo	6	6
(Brazil) F de Paula	2	1
Q	(Colombia) N Barrientos	3	7	7
(Brazil) F Romboli	6	5	5
3	(Spain) R Ramírez Hidalgo	6	6
(Peru) D Beretta	3	4
(Colombia) R Farah	6	7^{16}
6	(Argentina) G Pella	4	6^{14}

Quarterfinals
1	(Colombia) S Giraldo	6	6
Q	(Colombia) N Barrientos	2	3
3	(Spain) R Ramírez Hidalgo	4	7^{7}	7^{7}
(Colombia) R Farah	6	6^{4}	6^{3}

Semifinals
1	(Colombia) S Giraldo	6	6^{4}	4
3	(Spain) R Ramírez Hidalgo	2	7^{7}	6

=== Bottom half ===
First round
8	(Colombia) E Struvay	2	0^{r}
(Argentina) M Trungelliti	6	1
Q	(Colombia) M Quintero	7	6
(Brazil) M Demoliner	5	4
(Italy) W Trusendi	6	6
(Argentina) A Molteni	3	0
WC	(Colombia) Sebastian Serrano	2	1
4	(Argentina) M Alund	6	6
7	(Colombia) C Salamanca	6	3	6
(Serbia) N Ćaćić	3	6	3
(Canada) S Diez	6	6
(Russia) A Kumantsov	1	0
Q	(Montenegro) G Tošić	6	6
(Chile) J Aguilar	1	3
(Chile) G Rivera Aránguiz	3	4
2/WC	(Colombia) A Falla	6	6

Second round
(Argentina) M Trungelliti	6	6
Q	(Colombia) M Quintero	2	3
(Italy) W Trusendi	6	2	3
4	(Argentina) M Alund	3	6	6
7	(Colombia) C Salamanca	6	6
(Canada) S Diez	1	3
Q	(Montenegro) G Tošić
2/WC	(Colombia) A Falla	w/o

Quarterfinals
(Argentina) M Trungelliti	4	4
4	(Argentina) M Alund	6	6
7	(Colombia) C Salamanca	6	6
Q	(Montenegro) G Tošić	1	2

Semifinals
4	(Argentina) M Alund	6	6^{6}	2
7	(Colombia) C Salamanca	2	7^{8}	6
