= 2013 Seguros Bolívar Open Pereira – Doubles =

Doubles
- 2013 Seguros Bolívar Open Pereira

Final
- Champions: (Colombia) Nicolás Barrientos (Colombia) Eduardo Struvay
- Runners-up: (Argentina) Facundo Bagnis (Argentina) Federico Delbonis
- Score: 3–6, 6–3, [10–6]

Events
Singles	Doubles
← 2012 ·	Seguros Bolívar Open Pereira	· 2014 →

Martín Alund and Guido Pella were the defending champions but decided not to participate.
Nicolás Barrientos and Eduardo Struvay defeated Facundo Bagnis and Federico Delbonis 3–6, 6–3, [10–6] in the final to win the title.

== Seeds ==
1. (Colombia) Juan Sebastián Cabal / (Colombia) Robert Farah (first round)
2. (United States) Nicholas Monroe / (Germany) Simon Stadler (semifinals)
3. (Brazil) Fabiano de Paula / (Uruguay) Marcel Felder (quarterfinals)
4. (Croatia) Ivo Karlović / (Germany) Frank Moser (semifinals)

== Draw ==
=== Key ===
- Q = Qualifier
- WC = Wild card
- LL = Lucky loser
- Alt = Alternate
- SE = Special exempt
- PR = Protected ranking
- ITF = ITF entry
- JE = Junior exempt
- w/o = Walkover
- r = Retired
- d = Defaulted
- SR = Special ranking

=== Draw ===
First round
1	(Colombia) JS Cabal (Colombia) R Farah	3	6^{6}
(Argentina) F Bagnis (Argentina) F Delbonis	6	7^{8}
WC	(United States) Sam Barnett (United States) K Kim	1	2
(Croatia) D Marcan (Germany) A Satschko	6	6
4	(Croatia) I Karlović (Germany) F Moser	1	7	[10]
(Colombia) A González (Italy) C Grassi	6	5	[7]
(Croatia) N Mektić (Croatia) A Veić	5	4
(Portugal) F Gil (Brazil) J Souza	7	6
WC	(Colombia) N Barrientos (Colombia) E Struvay	6^{5}	7	[10]
(Russia) T Gabashvili (Italy) S Ianni	7^{7}	5	[7]
WC	(Colombia) Felipe Escobar (Colombia) C Salamanca	6	6^{6}	[10]
3	(Brazil) F de Paula (Uruguay) M Felder	4	7^{8}	[12]
(Chile) J Aguilar (Chile) P Capdeville	7^{7}	7
(Brazil) G Clezar (Brazil) R Dutra da Silva	6^{3}	5
(Argentina) R Olivo (Argentina) M Trungelliti	3	2
2	(United States) N Monroe (Germany) S Stadler	6	6

Quarterfinals
(Argentina) F Bagnis (Argentina) F Delbonis	7^{7}	6
(Croatia) D Marcan (Germany) A Satschko	6^{2}	4
4	(Croatia) I Karlović (Germany) F Moser	5	6	[10]
(Portugal) F Gil (Brazil) J Souza	7	3	[8]
WC	(Colombia) N Barrientos (Colombia) E Struvay	6	6
3	(Brazil) F de Paula (Uruguay) M Felder	3	2
(Chile) J Aguilar (Chile) P Capdeville	3	7	[7]
2	(United States) N Monroe (Germany) S Stadler	6	5	[10]

Semifinals
(Argentina) F Bagnis (Argentina) F Delbonis	6	6
4	(Croatia) I Karlović (Germany) F Moser	4	3
WC	(Colombia) N Barrientos (Colombia) E Struvay	5	7^{10}	[10]
2	(United States) N Monroe (Germany) S Stadler	7	6^{8}	[8]

Final
(Argentina) F Bagnis (Argentina) F Delbonis	6	3	[6]
WC	(Colombia) N Barrientos (Colombia) E Struvay	3	6	[10]
