= 2014 Seguros Bolívar Open Pereira – Singles =

Singles
- 2014 Seguros Bolívar Open Pereira

Final
- Champion: (Dominican Republic) Víctor Estrella Burgos
- Runner-up: (Brazil) João Souza
- Score: 7–6^{(7–5)}, 3–6, 7–6^{(8–6)}

Events
Singles	Doubles
- Seguros Bolívar Open Pereira

Santiago Giraldo was the defending champion, but chose to play in the Shenzhen Open instead.

Víctor Estrella Burgos won the title, defeating João Souza 7–6^{(7–5)}, 3–6, 7–6^{(8–6)} in the final.

== Seeds ==
1. (Dominican Republic) Víctor Estrella Burgos (champion)
2. (Colombia) Alejandro Falla (first round)
3. (Italy) Paolo Lorenzi (second round)
4. (Colombia) Alejandro González (first round)
5. (Brazil) João Souza (final)
6. (Argentina) Horacio Zeballos (first round)
7. (Argentina) Guido Pella (semifinals)
8. (United States) Austin Krajicek (second round)

== Draw ==
Key

- Q = Qualifier
- WC = Wild card
- LL = Lucky loser
- Alt = Alternate
- ITF = ITF entry
- PR = Protected ranking
- SR = Special ranking
- SE = Special exempt
- JE = Junior exempt
- JR = Junior Accelerator Programme entrant
- CO = College Accelerator Programme entrant
- NG = Next Gen Accelerator Program entrant
- w/o = Walkover
- r = Retired
- d = Defaulted

=== Finals ===
Semifinals
1	(Dominican Republic) Víctor Estrella Burgos	6	6
7	(Argentina) Guido Pella	4	2
5	(Brazil) João Souza	3	6	7^{7}
(Argentina) Agustín Velotti	6	4	6^{4}

Final
1	(Dominican Republic) Víctor Estrella Burgos	7^{7}	3	7^{8}
5	(Brazil) João Souza	6^{5}	6	6^{6}

=== Top half ===
First round
1	(Dominican Republic) V Estrella Burgos	6	7^{7}
(Chile) N Jarry	4	6^{5}
(United States) C Buchanan	2	6	6
(Colombia) N Barrientos	6	4	2
WC	(Colombia) JC Spir	4	4
(Spain) D Muñoz de la Nava	6	6
(Chile) G Lama	3	6	3
8	(United States) A Krajicek	6	1	6
4	(Colombia) A González	4	7	5
(Bolivia) H Dellien	6	5	7
(Croatia) T Androić	4	7^{7}	6
(Argentina) M Trungelliti	6	6^{3}	4
(Argentina) JI Londero	6	6
SE	(Ecuador) G Escobar	2	4
Q	(Peru) JP Varillas	4	4
7	(Argentina) G Pella	6	6

Second round
1	(Dominican Republic) V Estrella Burgos	6	6
(United States) C Buchanan	2	4
(Spain) D Muñoz de la Nava	6	6
8	(United States) A Krajicek	3	0
(Bolivia) H Dellien	6^{6}	4
(Croatia) T Androić	7^{8}	6
(Argentina) JI Londero	7	3	1
7	(Argentina) G Pella	5	6	6

Quarterfinals
1	(Dominican Republic) V Estrella Burgos	7^{8}	6
(Spain) D Muñoz de la Nava	6^{6}	4
(Croatia) T Androić	2	5
7	(Argentina) G Pella	6	7

Semifinals
1	(Dominican Republic) V Estrella Burgos	6	6
7	(Argentina) G Pella	4	2

=== Bottom half ===
First round
5	(Brazil) J Souza	6	6
Q	(Dominican Republic) J Hernández	2	4
Q	(Ecuador) I Endara	2	6^{3}
(United States) K King	6	7^{7}
(Argentina) A Molteni	6	6
WC	(Colombia) DE Galán	2	2
(Croatia) N Mektić	2	2
3	(Italy) P Lorenzi	6	6
6	(Argentina) H Zeballos	6^{8}	6	3
(Sweden) C Lindell	7^{10}	4	6
(Ecuador) G Lapentti	6	7
Q	(Brazil) Wilson Leite	2	5
(Greece) T Angelinos	6	6
WC	(Colombia) E Struvay	3	4
(Argentina) A Velotti	6	4	6
2/WC	(Colombia) A Falla	3	6	3

Second round
5	(Brazil) J Souza	6	6
(United States) K King	2	3
(Argentina) A Molteni	4	6	6
3	(Italy) P Lorenzi	6	3	1
(Sweden) C Lindell	7	7
(Ecuador) G Lapentti	5	5
(Greece) T Angelinos	6^{2}	6^{2}
(Argentina) A Velotti	7^{7}	7^{7}

Quarterfinals
5	(Brazil) J Souza	6	3	6
(Argentina) A Molteni	3	6	1
(Sweden) C Lindell	6^{2}	3
(Argentina) A Velotti	7^{7}	6

Semifinals
5	(Brazil) J Souza	3	6	7^{7}
(Argentina) A Velotti	6	4	6^{4}
