= 2013 Seguros Bolívar Open Pereira =

- Date: 25 March – 31 March
- Edition: 3rd
- Draw: 32S / 16D
- Prize money: $50,000+H
- Surface: Clay
- Location: Pereira, Colombia

Champions

Singles
- (Colombia) Santiago Giraldo

Doubles
- (Colombia) Nicolás Barrientos / (Colombia) Eduardo Struvay
← 2012 ·	Seguros Bolívar Open Pereira	· 2014 →

The 2013 Seguros Bolívar Open Pereira was a professional tennis tournament played on clay courts. It was the third edition of the tournament which was part of the 2013 ATP Challenger Tour. It took place in Pereira, Colombia between 25 March and 31 March 2013.

== Singles main draw entrants ==
=== Seeds ===
Country	Player	Rank^{1}	Seed
ITA	Paolo Lorenzi	59	1
COL	Santiago Giraldo	90	2
ARG	Federico Delbonis	114	3
BRA	Rogério Dutra da Silva	123	4
BRA	João Souza	141	5
CRO	Ivo Karlović	131	6
CRO	Antonio Veić	135	7
COL	Alejandro González	166	8

- ^{1} Rankings are as of March 18, 2013.

=== Other entrants ===
The following players received wildcards into the singles main draw:

- (Colombia) Juan Sebastián Cabal
- (Colombia) Felipe Escobar
- (Italy) Paolo Lorenzi
- (Colombia) Eduardo Struvay

The following players received entry as an alternate into the singles main draw:

- (Croatia) Toni Androić

The following players received entry from the qualifying draw:

- (Ecuador) Iván Endara
- (Italy) Federico Gaio
- (Slovakia) Jozef Kovalík
- (Venezuela) David Souto

== Doubles main draw entrants ==
=== Seeds ===
Country	Player	Country	Player	Rank^{1}	Seed
COL	Juan Sebastián Cabal	COL	Robert Farah	96	1
USA	Nicholas Monroe	GER	Simon Stadler	141	2
BRA	Fabiano de Paula	URU	Marcel Felder	318	3
CRO	Ivo Karlović	GER	Frank Moser	318	4

- ^{1} Rankings as of March 18, 2013.

=== Other entrants ===
The following pairs received wildcards into the doubles main draw:

- (United States) Sam Barnett / (United States) Kevin Kim
- (Colombia) Nicolás Barrientos / (Colombia) Eduardo Struvay
- (Colombia) Felipe Escobar / (Colombia) Carlos Salamanca

== Champions ==
=== Singles ===
- (Colombia) Santiago Giraldo def. (Chile) Paul Capdeville, 6–2, 6–4

=== Doubles ===
- (Colombia) Nicolás Barrientos / (Colombia) Eduardo Struvay def. (Argentina) Facundo Bagnis / (Argentina) Federico Delbonis, 3–6, 6–3, [10–6]
