= 2010 Seguros Bolívar Open Pereira – Singles =

Singles
- 2010 Seguros Bolívar Open Pereira

Final
- Champion: (Colombia) Santiago Giraldo
- Runner-up: (Italy) Paolo Lorenzi
- Score: 6–3, 6–3

Events
Singles	Doubles
← 2009 ·	Seguros Bolívar Open Pereira	· 2011 →

Alejandro Falla was the defending champion but did not compete this year.
Santiago Giraldo won in the final 6–3, 6–3 against Paolo Lorenzi.

== Seeds ==
1. (Colombia) Santiago Giraldo (champion)
2. (Italy) Paolo Lorenzi (final)
3. (Chile) Paul Capdeville (first round)
4. (Brazil) João Souza (second round)
5. (Argentina) Sebastián Decoud (first round)
6. (Argentina) Gastón Gaudio (second round)
7. (Colombia) Carlos Salamanca (semifinals)
8. (France) Alexandre Sidorenko (first round)

== Draw ==
=== Key ===
- Q = Qualifier
- WC = Wild card
- LL = Lucky loser
- Alt = Alternate
- SE = Special exempt
- PR = Protected ranking
- ITF = ITF entry
- JE = Junior exempt
- w/o = Walkover
- r = Retired
- d = Defaulted
- SR = Special ranking

=== Finals ===
Semifinals
1	(Colombia) Santiago Giraldo	6	7
(Portugal) Leonardo Tavares	4	6^{5}
7	(Colombia) Carlos Salamanca	5	6	6^{4}
2	(Italy) Paolo Lorenzi	7	3	7

Final
1	(Colombia) Santiago Giraldo	6	6
2	(Italy) Paolo Lorenzi	3	3

=== Top half ===
First round
1	(Colombia) S Giraldo	6	6
(Colombia) A González	2	0
SE	(Colombia) JS Cabal	6	6
Q	(Colombia) JS Gómez	0	0
(Argentina) Guido Pella	7	6
(Italy) R Ghedin	5	4
(Spain) A Brugués Davi	6	6
8	(France) A Sidorenko	4	2
3	(Chile) P Capdeville	1	6^{5}
(Ecuador) G Lapentti	6	7
(Hungary) A Balázs	6	4	3
(France) J Dasnières de Veigy	4	6	6
WC	(United States) Carlton Fiorentino	0	3
(Argentina) M Alund	6	6
(Portugal) L Tavares	5	6	7
5	(Argentina) S Decoud	7	3	5

Second round
1	(Colombia) S Giraldo	6	6
SE	(Colombia) JS Cabal	1	2
(Argentina) G Pella	3	4
(Spain) A Brugués Davi	6	6
(Ecuador) G Lapentti	2	4
(France) J Dasnières de Veigy	6	6
(Argentina) M Alund	6^{1}	2
(Portugal) L Tavares	7	6

Quarterfinals
1	(Colombia) S Giraldo	7	6
(Spain) A Brugués Davi	6^{2}	1
(France) J Dasnières de Veigy	6	1	3
(Portugal) L Tavares	4	6	6

Semifinals
1	(Colombia) S Giraldo	6	7
(Portugal) L Tavares	4	6^{5}

=== Bottom half ===
First round
7	(Colombia) C Salamanca	6^{5}	6	6
(Germany) G Kretschmer	7	4	3
WC	(Ecuador) E Gómez	7	7
WC	(Colombia) E Struvay	5	6^{6}
(Austria) P Oswald	4	2
(Germany) D Meffert	6	6
(Austria) M Slanar	4	4
4	(Brazil) J Souza	6	6
6/WC	(Argentina) G Gaudio	6	6
(Germany) A Satschko	1	4
Q	(Colombia) M Quintero	1	2
Q	(Argentina) F Bagnis	6	6
Q	(Ecuador) I Endara	6	2	1^{d}
(Montenegro) G Tošić	3	6	3
(Romania) C Gârd	1	3
2	(Italy) P Lorenzi	6	6

Second round
7	(Colombia) C Salamanca	7	6
WC	(Ecuador) E Gómez	5	1
(Germany) D Meffert	3	6	6
4	(Brazil) J Souza	6	1	4
6/WC	(Argentina) G Gaudio	3	4
Q	(Argentina) F Bagnis	6	6
(Montenegro) G Tošić	4	4
2	(Italy) P Lorenzi	6	6

Quarterfinals
7	(Colombia) C Salamanca	6	6
(Germany) D Meffert	2	2
Q	(Argentina) F Bagnis	7	3	2
2	(Italy) P Lorenzi	6^{8}	6	6

Semifinals
7	(Colombia) C Salamanca	5	6	6^{4}
2	(Italy) P Lorenzi	7	3	7
