= 2012 Seguros Bolívar Open Pereira – Doubles =

Doubles
- 2012 Seguros Bolívar Open Pereira

Final
- Champions: (Argentina) Martín Alund (Argentina) Guido Pella
- Runners-up: (Argentina) Sebastián Decoud (Spain) Rubén Ramírez Hidalgo
- Score: 6–3, 2–6, [10–5]

Events
Singles	Doubles
← 2011 ·	Seguros Bolívar Open Pereira	· 2013 →

Marcel Felder and Carlos Salamanca were the defending champions but Felder decided not to participate.
Salamanca played alongside Eduardo Struvay.
Martín Alund and Guido Pella won the title by defeating Sebastián Decoud and Rubén Ramírez Hidalgo 6–3, 2–6, [10–5] in the final.

== Seeds ==
1. (Colombia) Alejandro Falla / (Colombia) Robert Farah (withdrew)
2. (Chile) Jorge Aguilar / (Argentina) Guillermo Durán (withdrew)
3. (Serbia) Nikola Cacic / (Montenegro) Goran Tošić (quarterfinals)
4. (Ecuador) Júlio César Campozano / (Dominican Republic) Víctor Estrella (first round)

== Draw ==
=== Key ===
- Q = Qualifier
- WC = Wild card
- LL = Lucky loser
- Alt = Alternate
- SE = Special exempt
- PR = Protected ranking
- ITF = ITF entry
- JE = Junior exempt
- w/o = Walkover
- r = Retired
- d = Defaulted
- SR = Special ranking

=== Draw ===
First round
Alt	(Peru) D Beretta (Italy) W Trusendi	3	1
(Colombia) C Salamanca (Colombia) E Struvay	6	6
WC	(Dominican Republic) Michael-Ray Pallares-González (United States) Murphey Parker	2	0
(Canada) Steven Diez (Argentina) Diego Schwartzman	6	6
3	(Serbia) N Čačić (Montenegro) G Tošić	7^{7}	4	[13]
(Russia) A Kumantsov (United States) M Sykut	6^{3}	6	[11]
(Uruguay) A Behar (Brazil) M Demoliner	4	1
(Argentina) S Decoud (Spain) R Ramírez Hidalgo	6	6
(Argentina) A Molteni (Argentina) M Trungelliti	6	6
WC	(United States) Sam Barnett (United States) K Kim	1	2
WC	(Colombia) N Barrientos (Colombia) M Quintero	6	3	[10]
4	(Ecuador) JC Campozano (Dominican Republic) V Estrella	3	6	[5]
(Chile) G Rivera-Aránguiz (Chile) C Saavedra-Corvalán	2	6	[9]
(Argentina) M Alund (Argentina) G Pella	6	4	[11]
(Colombia) A González (Brazil) F Romboli	6^{5}	6^{2}
Alt	(Colombia) Felipe Escobar (Colombia) Felipe Mantilla	7^{7}	7^{7}

Quarterfinals
(Colombia) C Salamanca (Colombia) E Struvay
(Canada) Steven Diez (Argentina) Diego Schwartzman	w/o
3	(Serbia) N Čačić (Montenegro) G Tošić	1	2
(Argentina) S Decoud (Spain) R Ramírez Hidalgo	6	6
(Argentina) A Molteni (Argentina) M Trungelliti	1	3
WC	(Colombia) N Barrientos (Colombia) M Quintero	6	6
(Argentina) M Alund (Argentina) G Pella	6	6
Alt	(Colombia) Felipe Escobar (Colombia) Felipe Mantilla	3	2

Semifinals
(Colombia) C Salamanca (Colombia) E Struvay	3	6^{1}
(Argentina) S Decoud (Spain) R Ramírez Hidalgo	6	7^{7}
WC	(Colombia) N Barrientos (Colombia) M Quintero	4	2
(Argentina) M Alund (Argentina) G Pella	6	6

Final
(Argentina) S Decoud (Spain) R Ramírez Hidalgo	3	6	[5]
(Argentina) M Alund (Argentina) G Pella	6	2	[10]
