= 2009 Seguros Bolívar Open Pereira – Doubles =

Doubles
- 2009 Seguros Bolívar Open Pereira

Final
- Champions: (Dominican Republic) Víctor Estrella (Brazil) João Souza
- Runners-up: (Colombia) Juan Sebastián Cabal (Colombia) Alejandro Falla
- Score: 6–4, 6–4

Events
Singles	Doubles
← 2008 ·	Seguros Bolívar Open Pereira	· 2010 →

2nd-seeded Víctor Estrella and João Souza defeated 1st-seeded Juan Sebastián Cabal and Alejandro Falla in the final. They won 6–4, 6–4 and became the first champions of this tournament.

== Seeds ==
1. (Colombia) Juan Sebastián Cabal / (Colombia) Alejandro Falla (final)
2. (Dominican Republic) Víctor Estrella / (Brazil) João Souza (champions)
3. (Colombia) Michael Quintero / (Colombia) Carlos Salamanca (semifinals)
4. (Ecuador) Iván Endara / (Brazil) Júlio Silva (semifinals)

== Draw ==
=== Key ===
- Q = Qualifier
- WC = Wild card
- LL = Lucky loser
- Alt = Alternate
- SE = Special exempt
- PR = Protected ranking
- ITF = ITF entry
- JE = Junior exempt
- w/o = Walkover
- r = Retired
- d = Defaulted
- SR = Special ranking

=== Draw ===
First round
1	(Colombia) JS Cabal (Colombia) A Falla	6^{5}	7	[10]
(Paraguay) R Delgado (Ecuador) G Lapentti	7	5	[6]
(Colombia) S Galán (Colombia) S Zornosa	1	4
(Ecuador) JC Campozano (Brazil) A Miele	6	6
4	(Ecuador) I Endara (Brazil) J Silva	6	7
(Colombia) A González (Colombia) E Struvay	3	6^{7}
(Colombia) J D Bendeck (Colombia) S Serrano	6	6
WC	(Colombia) F Escobar (Colombia) J F Ramírez	1	3
(Uruguay) M Felder (United States) E Nunez	6	6
WC	(Colombia) D Giraldo (Colombia) J A Suárez	1	1
(Argentina) G Marcaccio (Argentina) D Veronelli	3	4
3	(Colombia) M Quintero (Colombia) C Salamanca	6	6
WC	(Colombia) S Gómez (Colombia) J C Sierra	2	2
(Argentina) J-P Amado (Brazil) C Zampieri	6	6
(United States) S Bass (United Kingdom) J Ward	4	6	[9]
2	(Dominican Republic) V Estrella (Brazil) J Souza	6	4	[11]

Quarterfinals
1	(Colombia) JS Cabal (Colombia) A Falla	6	6
(Ecuador) JC Campozano (Brazil) A Miele	1	1
4	(Ecuador) I Endara (Brazil) J Silva	6	6
(Colombia) J D Bendeck (Colombia) S Serrano	3	3
(Uruguay) M Felder (United States) E Nunez	6	6^{4}	[8]
3	(Colombia) M Quintero (Colombia) C Salamanca	4	7	[10]
(Argentina) J-P Amado (Brazil) C Zampieri	6^{5}	6	[8]
2	(Dominican Republic) V Estrella (Brazil) J Souza	7	4	[10]

Semifinals
1	(Colombia) JS Cabal (Colombia) A Falla	6	6
4	(Ecuador) I Endara (Brazil) J Silva	2	3
3	(Colombia) M Quintero (Colombia) C Salamanca	4	2
2	(Dominican Republic) V Estrella (Brazil) J Souza	6	6

Finals
1	(Colombia) JS Cabal (Colombia) A Falla	4	4
2	(Dominican Republic) V Estrella (Brazil) J Souza	6	6
