= 2015 Seguros Bolívar Open Pereira =

- Date: 28 September – 4 October
- Edition: 7th
- Surface: Clay
- Location: Pereira, Colombia

Champions

Singles
- (Italy) Paolo Lorenzi

Doubles
- (Argentina) Andrés Molteni / (Brazil) Fernando Romboli
| ← 2014 · | Seguros Bolívar Open Pereira | · 2016 → |

The 2015 Seguros Bolívar Open Pereira was a professional tennis tournament played on clay courts. It was the seventh edition of the tournament which was part of the 2015 ATP Challenger Tour. It took place in Pereira, Colombia between 8 September and 4 October.

== Singles main-draw entrants ==
=== Seeds ===
| Country | Player | Rank^{1} | Seed |
|---|---|---|---|
| ITA | Paolo Lorenzi | 89 | 1 |
| BRA | João Souza | 113 | 2 |
| COL | Alejandro González | 120 | 3 |
| COL | Alejandro Falla | 121 | 4 |
| BRA | Guilherme Clezar | 173 | 5 |
| ESP | Jordi Samper-Montaña | 206 | 6 |
| COL | Nicolás Barrientos | 237 | 7 |
| ECU | Giovanni Lapentti | 239 | 8 |

- ^{1} Rankings are as of September 20, 2015.

=== Other entrants ===
The following players received wildcards into the singles main draw:

- (Colombia) Mateo Andres Ruiz Naranjo
- (Colombia) Daniel Elahi Galán
- (Colombia) Nicolás Barrientos
- (Colombia) Alejandro Gomez

The following players received entry from the qualifying draw:

- (Colombia) Daniel Mora
- (Venezuela) Luis David Martínez
- (Colombia) Felipe Escobar
- (Chile) Michel Vernier

== Doubles main-draw entrants ==
=== Seeds ===
| Country | Player | Country | Player | Rank^{1} | Seed |
|---|---|---|---|---|---|
| MEX | César Ramírez | MEX | Miguel Ángel Reyes-Varela | 228 | 1 |
| ITA | Paolo Lorenzi | BRA | João Souza | 261 | 2 |
| COL | Nicolás Barrientos | COL | Eduardo Struvay | 345 | 3 |
| ARG | Andrés Molteni | BRA | Fernando Romboli | 439 | 4 |

- ^{1} Rankings are as of September 20, 2015.

=== Other entrants ===
The following pairs received wildcards into the doubles main draw:

- (Ecuador) Iván Endara / (Colombia) Daniel Elahi Galán
- (Colombia) Juan Montes / (Colombia) Felipe Rojas
- (Colombia) Alejandro Gomez / (Colombia) Felipe Escobar

== Champions ==
=== Singles ===
- (Italy) Paolo Lorenzi def. (Colombia) Alejandro González, 4–6, 6–3, 6–4

=== Doubles ===
- (Argentina) Andrés Molteni / (Brazil) Fernando Romboli def. (El Salvador) Marcelo Arévalo / (Colombia) Juan Sebastián Gómez, 6–4, 7–6^{(14–12)}
