= 2011 Seguros Bolívar Open Pereira – Singles =

Singles
- 2011 Seguros Bolívar Open Pereira

Final
- Champion: (Italy) Paolo Lorenzi
- Runner-up: (Brazil) Rogério Dutra da Silva
- Score: 7–5, 6–2

Events
Singles	Doubles
← 2010 ·	Seguros Bolívar Open Pereira	· 2012 →

Santiago Giraldo was the defending champion, but decided not to participate.
Paolo Lorenzi defeated Rogério Dutra da Silva 7–5, 6–2 in the final.

== Seeds ==
1. (Colombia) Alejandro Falla (second round)
2. (Argentina) Eduardo Schwank (second round)
3. (Brazil) João Souza (second round)
4. (France) Éric Prodon (second round)
5. (Italy) Paolo Lorenzi (champion)
6. (Argentina) Diego Junqueira (second round)
7. (Brazil) Rogério Dutra da Silva (final)
8. (Argentina) Leonardo Mayer (first round)

== Draw ==
=== Key ===
- Q = Qualifier
- WC = Wild card
- LL = Lucky loser
- Alt = Alternate
- SE = Special exempt
- PR = Protected ranking
- ITF = ITF entry
- JE = Junior exempt
- w/o = Walkover
- r = Retired
- d = Defaulted
- SR = Special ranking

=== Finals ===
Semifinals
5	(Italy) Paolo Lorenzi	6	6
(Colombia) Juan Sebastián Cabal	0	4
7	(Brazil) Rogério Dutra da Silva	1	6	7
(Spain) Javier Martí	6	2	5

Final
5	(Italy) Paolo Lorenzi	7	6
7	(Brazil) Rogério Dutra da Silva	5	2

=== Top half ===
First round
1	(Colombia) A Falla	6	6
(Colombia) C Salamanca	4	2
(Argentina) F Bagnis	7	6
(Uruguay) M Felder	5	0
(Argentina) S Decoud	6	7
WC	(Colombia) Sebastián López	1	5
(Argentina) M Alund	6	3	2
5	(Italy) P Lorenzi	4	6	6
3	(Brazil) J Souza	6	6
Q	(Colombia) JC Campozano	4	4
(United States) K Kim	7	2	2
(Colombia) JS Cabal	6^{5}	6	6
(Colombia) R Farah	6^{1}	3
(Dominican Republic) V Estrella	7	6
Q	(Argentina) M Trungelliti	6	4	6
8	(Argentina) L Mayer	3	6	4

Second round
1	(Colombia) A Falla	4	3
(Argentina) F Bagnis	6	6
(Argentina) S Decoud	7	4	4
5	(Italy) P Lorenzi	5	6	6
3	(Brazil) J Souza	3	6	2
(Colombia) JS Cabal	6	3	6
(Dominican Republic) V Estrella	6	4	4
Q	(Argentina) M Trungelliti	3	6	6

Quarterfinals
(Argentina) F Bagnis	3	1
5	(Italy) P Lorenzi	6	6
(Colombia) JS Cabal	6	6
Q	(Argentina) M Trungelliti	0	4

Semifinals
5	(Italy) P Lorenzi	6	6
(Colombia) JS Cabal	0	4

=== Bottom half ===
First round
7	(Brazil) R Dutra da Silva	6	6^{3}	6
(Argentina) JP Brzezicki	4	7	4
(Chile) J Aguilar	5	5
WC	(Colombia) N Barrientos	7	7
(Argentina) M Vassallo Argüello	6	6^{4}	4
WC	(Colombia) E Struvay	1	7	6
(Argentina) A Molteni	6^{4}	1
4	(France) É Prodon	7	6
6	(Argentina) D Junqueira	7	6
Q	(Argentina) Guillermo Durán	6^{0}	3
(Italy) R Ghedin	3	6	6
Q	(United States) D Zivkovic	6	3	1
WC	(Argentina) Manuel Barros	0	0
(Spain) J Martí	6	6
(United Kingdom) J Ward	6^{6}	7	2
2	(Argentina) E Schwank	7	5	6

Second round
7	(Brazil) R Dutra da Silva	6	6
WC	(Colombia) N Barrientos	2	4
WC	(Colombia) E Struvay	4	7	6
4	(France) É Prodon	6	6^{5}	2
6	(Argentina) D Junqueira	4	2
(Italy) R Ghedin	6	6
(Spain) J Martí	3
2	(Argentina) E Schwank	3^{r}

Quarterfinals
7	(Brazil) R Dutra da Silva	6	6
WC	(Colombia) E Struvay	4	2
(Italy) R Ghedin	3	3
(Spain) J Martí	6	6

Semifinals
7	(Brazil) R Dutra da Silva	1	6	7
(Spain) J Martí	6	2	5
