= 2009 Seguros Bolívar Open Pereira – Singles =

Singles
- 2009 Seguros Bolívar Open Pereira

Final
- Champion: (Colombia) Alejandro Falla
- Runner-up: (Argentina) Horacio Zeballos
- Score: 6–4, 4–6, 6–2

Events
Singles	Doubles
← 2008 ·	Seguros Bolívar Open Pereira	· 2010 →

Alejandro Falla won in the final 6–4, 4–6, 6–2, against Horacio Zeballos and he became the first champion of this tournament.

== Seeds ==
1. (Argentina) Horacio Zeballos (final)
2. (Colombia) Santiago Giraldo (quarterfinals)
3. (Ecuador) Giovanni Lapentti (quarterfinals)
4. (Argentina) Mariano Puerta (semifinals, withdrew)
5. (Colombia) Alejandro Falla (champion)
6. (Dominican Republic) Víctor Estrella (first round)
7. (Brazil) Caio Zampieri (first round)
8. (Brazil) João Souza (semifinals)

== Draw ==
=== Key ===
- Q = Qualifier
- WC = Wild card
- LL = Lucky loser
- Alt = Alternate
- SE = Special exempt
- PR = Protected ranking
- ITF = ITF entry
- JE = Junior exempt
- w/o = Walkover
- r = Retired
- d = Defaulted
- SR = Special ranking

=== Final four ===
Semifinals
1	(Argentina) Horacio Zeballos
4	(Argentina) Mariano Puerta	w/o
8	(Brazil) João Souza	4	4
5	(Colombia) Alejandro Falla	6	6

Final
1	(Argentina) Horacio Zeballos	4	6	2
5	(Colombia) Alejandro Falla	6	4	6

=== Top half ===
First round
1	(Argentina) H Zeballos	6	6
(Ecuador) I Endara	4	4
(Colombia) JS Cabal	7	6
(Colombia) C Salamanca	6^{4}	4
WC	(Colombia) E Struvay	7	6
Q	(Colombia) S López	6^{0}	3
(Uruguay) M Felder	5	7	6
6	(Dominican Republic) V Estrella	7	5	3
4	(Argentina) M Puerta	6	6
(Colombia) M Quintero	4	4
(Brazil) J Silva	3	6	7
WC	(Argentina) M Zabaleta	6	4	6^{5}
(Colombia) A González	6	6
(Argentina) J-P Amado	2	1
Q	(United Kingdom) J Ward	7	6
7	(Brazil) C Zampieri	6^{5}	3

Second round
1	(Argentina) H Zeballos	3	7	6
(Colombia) JS Cabal	6	6^{3}	3
(Colombia) E Struvay	6	6
WC	(Uruguay) M Felder	4	2
4	(Argentina) M Puerta	7	7
(Brazil) J Silva	6^{3}	6^{5}
(Colombia) A González	3	6^{1}
Q	(United Kingdom) J Ward	6	7

Quarterfinals
1	(Argentina) H Zeballos	6	6
WC	(Colombia) E Struvay	3	4
4	(Argentina) M Puerta	7	6
Q	(United Kingdom) J Ward	5	4

Semifinals
1	(Argentina) H Zeballos
4	(Argentina) M Puerta	w/o

=== Bottom half ===
First round
8	(Brazil) J Souza	7	7
Q	(Colombia) S Galán	6^{7}	6^{3}
(Argentina) D Veronelli	4	6	2
(United States) S Bass	6	3	6
(Paraguay) R Delgado	4	6	7
(Argentina) N Todero	6	3	6^{3}
(Ecuador) JC Campozano	6	1	4
3	(Ecuador) G Lapentti	3	6	6
5	(Colombia) A Falla	6	6
(Brazil) A Miele	2	2
(United States) E Nunez	6	7
Q	(Colombia) J Flores	2	5
(Venezuela) J de Armas	6	6
WC	(Colombia) A Herrera	0	2
WC	(Colombia) F Mantilla	1	1
2	(Colombia) S Giraldo	6	6

Second round
8	(Brazil) J Souza	5	7	7
(United States) S Bass	7	6^{10}	5
(Paraguay) R Delgado	6^{6}	2
3	(Ecuador) G Lapentti	7	6
5	(Colombia) A Falla	7	7
(United States) E Nunez	6^{1}	6^{3}
(Venezuela) J de Armas	2	1
2	(Colombia) S Giraldo	6	6

Quarterfinals
8	(Brazil) J Souza	6	6
3	(Ecuador) G Lapentti	2	4
5	(Colombia) A Falla	6	6
2	(Colombia) S Giraldo	3	4

Semifinals
8	(Brazil) J Souza	4	4
5	(Colombia) A Falla	6	6
