= 2011 Seguros Bolívar Open Pereira – Doubles =

Doubles
- 2011 Seguros Bolívar Open Pereira

Final
- Champions: (Uruguay) Marcel Felder (Colombia) Carlos Salamanca
- Runners-up: (Colombia) Alejandro Falla (Colombia) Eduardo Struvay
- Score: 7–6(5), 6–4

Events
| Singles | Doubles |
| ← 2010 · | Seguros Bolívar Open Pereira | · 2012 → |

Dominik Meffert and Philipp Oswald were the defending champions but decided not to participate.
Marcel Felder and Carlos Salamanca won the title, defeating Alejandro Falla and Eduardo Struvay 7–6(5), 6–4 in the final.

== Seeds ==
1. (Colombia) Juan Sebastián Cabal / (Colombia) Robert Farah (quarterfinals)
2. (Canada) Pierre-Ludovic Duclos / (United Kingdom) James Ward (quarterfinals)
3. (Mexico) Luis Díaz-Barriga / (Dominican Republic) Víctor Estrella (first round)
4. (Chile) Jorge Aguilar / (Mexico) Daniel Garza (quarterfinals)

== Draw ==
=== Key ===
- Q = Qualifier
- WC = Wild card
- LL = Lucky loser
- Alt = Alternate
- SE = Special exempt
- PR = Protected ranking
- ITF = ITF entry
- JE = Junior exempt
- w/o = Walkover
- r = Retired
- d = Defaulted
- SR = Special ranking

=== Draw ===
First round
1 | (Colombia) JS Cabal (Colombia) R Farah | 6 | 6
WC | (Colombia) N Barrientos (Colombia) Steffen Zornosa | 2 | 3
(Colombia) A Falla (Colombia) E Struvay | 6 | 6
(Argentina) F Bagnis (Argentina) A Molteni | 1 | 0
3 | (Mexico) L Díaz-Barriga (Dominican Republic) V Estrella | 4 | 3
(Argentina) M Alund (Argentina) Guillermo Durán | 6 | 6
(Italy) R Ghedin (Italy) P Lorenzi | 5 | 6 | [10]
(United States) M Sykut (United States) D Zivkovic | 7 | 4 | [2]
(Uruguay) M Felder (Colombia) C Salamanca | 6 | 6
(Ecuador) JC Campozano (Argentina) S Decoud | 4 | 2
(Colombia) JS Gómez (United States) K Kim | 5 | 3
4 | (Chile) J Aguilar (Mexico) D Garza | 7 | 6
WC | (Argentina) Nicolás Pastor (Argentina) M Trungelliti | 6 | 6
WC | (Colombia) Felipe Escobar (Colombia) Sebastián López | 0 | 2
(Spain) Óscar Burrieza (Spain) J Martí | 2 | 7 | [8]
2 | (Canada) P-L Duclos (United Kingdom) J Ward | 6 | 6^{5} | [10]

Quarterfinals
1 | (Colombia) JS Cabal (Colombia) R Farah | 6^{3} | 5
(Colombia) A Falla (Colombia) E Struvay | 7 | 7
(Argentina) M Alund (Argentina) Guillermo Durán | 7 | 2 | [5]
(Italy) R Ghedin (Italy) P Lorenzi | 6^{1} | 6 | [10]
(Uruguay) M Felder (Colombia) C Salamanca | 6 | 6
4 | (Chile) J Aguilar (Mexico) D Garza | 2 | 2
WC | (Argentina) Nicolás Pastor (Argentina) M Trungelliti | 0 | r
2 | (Canada) P-L Duclos (United Kingdom) J Ward | 4

Semifinals
(Colombia) A Falla (Colombia) E Struvay | 6 | 3 | [10]
(Italy) R Ghedin (Italy) P Lorenzi | 2 | 6 | [7]
(Uruguay) M Felder (Colombia) C Salamanca | 6 | 6
2 | (Canada) P-L Duclos (United Kingdom) J Ward | 3 | 2

Final
(Colombia) A Falla (Colombia) E Struvay | 6^{5} | 4
(Uruguay) M Felder (Colombia) C Salamanca | 7 | 6
