= 2015 Seguros Bolívar Open Pereira – Singles =

Singles
- 2015 Seguros Bolívar Open Pereira

Final
- Champion: (Italy) Paolo Lorenzi
- Runner-up: (Colombia) Alejandro González
- Score: 4–6, 6–3, 6–4

Events
Singles	Doubles
- Seguros Bolívar Open Pereira

Víctor Estrella Burgos was the defending champion, but chose to play in the Shenzhen Open instead.

Paolo Lorenzi defeated Alejandro González in the final for the title.

== Seeds ==
1. (Italy) Paolo Lorenzi (champion)
2. (Brazil) João Souza (semifinals)
3. (Colombia) Alejandro González (final)
4. (Colombia) Alejandro Falla (second round)
5. (Brazil) Guilherme Clezar (quarterfinals)
6. (Spain) Jordi Samper Montaña (second round)
7. (Colombia) Nicolás Barrientos (first round)
8. (Ecuador) Giovanni Lapentti (second round)

== Draw ==
Key

- Q = Qualifier
- WC = Wild card
- LL = Lucky loser
- Alt = Alternate
- ITF = ITF entry
- PR = Protected ranking
- SR = Special ranking
- SE = Special exempt
- JE = Junior exempt
- JR = Junior Accelerator Programme entrant
- CO = College Accelerator Programme entrant
- NG = Next Gen Accelerator Program entrant
- w/o = Walkover
- r = Retired
- d = Defaulted

=== Finals ===
Semifinals
1	(Italy) Paolo Lorenzi	6	6
(El Salvador) Marcelo Arévalo	1	3
3	(Colombia) Alejandro González	6	6^{4}	6
2	(Brazil) João Souza	2	7^{7}	3

Final
1	(Italy) Paolo Lorenzi	4	6	6
3	(Colombia) Alejandro González	6	2	4

=== Top half ===
First round
1	(Italy) P Lorenzi	6	6
(Italy) R Marcora	2	4
Q	(Colombia) Daniel Mora	3	2
(Argentina) JI Londero	6	6
(Guatemala) C Díaz Figueroa	3	7^{7}	4
(Colombia) JS Gómez	6	6^{4}	6
WC	(Colombia) MA Ruiz Naranjo	1	1
5	(Brazil) G Clezar	6	6
4	(Colombia) A Falla	7^{7}	7
(Chile) G Lama	6^{4}	5
Q	(Venezuela) LD Martínez	1	0
(El Salvador) M Arévalo	6	6
(Argentina) F Coria	6	6
Q	(Colombia) Felipe Escobar	3	2
(Belgium) Y Reuter	2	4
8	(Ecuador) G Lapentti	6	6

Second round
1	(Italy) P Lorenzi	6	6
(Argentina) JI Londero	4	3
(Colombia) JS Gómez	1	1
5	(Brazil) G Clezar	6	6
4	(Colombia) A Falla	2	4
(El Salvador) M Arévalo	6	6
(Argentina) F Coria	6	3	6
8	(Ecuador) G Lapentti	4	6	4

Quarterfinals
1	(Italy) P Lorenzi	6	6
5	(Brazil) G Clezar	4	2
(El Salvador) M Arévalo	6	7
(Argentina) F Coria	3	5

Semifinals
1	(Italy) P Lorenzi	6	6
(El Salvador) M Arévalo	1	3

=== Bottom half ===
First round
6	(Spain) J Samper Montaña	7^{7}	6
Q	(Chile) Michel Vernier	6^{5}	4
(Ecuador) G Escobar	2	7	6
(Argentina) A Molteni	6	5	3
(Argentina) F Mena	7	6^{3}	6
WC	(Colombia) DE Galán	5	7^{7}	2
WC	(Colombia) A Gómez	4	3
3	(Colombia) A González	6	6
7/WC	(Colombia) N Barrientos	3	6	4
(Ecuador) E Gómez	6	4	6
(Brazil) F Romboli	6	6
(Argentina) Juan Ignacio Galarza	3	3
(Italy) G Quinzi	2	6	2
(Ecuador) I Endara	6	2	6
(Colombia) E Struvay	5	2
2	(Brazil) J Souza	7	6

Second round
6	(Spain) J Samper Montaña	1	6^{2}
(Ecuador) G Escobar	6	7^{7}
(Argentina) F Mena	3	4
3	(Colombia) A González	6	6
(Ecuador) E Gómez	6	6
(Brazil) F Romboli	2	3
(Ecuador) I Endara	6	3	0
2	(Brazil) J Souza	3	6	6

Quarterfinals
(Ecuador) G Escobar	6	3	2
3	(Colombia) A González	4	6	6
(Ecuador) E Gómez	6	2	4
2	(Brazil) J Souza	2	6	6

Semifinals
3	(Colombia) A González	6	6^{4}	6
2	(Brazil) J Souza	2	7^{7}	3
