= 2010 Seguros Bolívar Open Pereira – Doubles =

Doubles
- 2010 Seguros Bolívar Open Pereira

Final
- Champions: (Germany) Dominik Meffert; (Austria) Philipp Oswald
- Runners-up: (Germany) Gero Kretschmer; (Germany) Alex Satschko
- Score: 6–7(4), 7–6(6), [10–5]

Events
Singles	Doubles
← 2009 ·	Seguros Bolívar Open Pereira	· 2011 →

João Souza and Víctor Estrella were the defending champions, but Estrella chose to compete in León instead.
Souza partnered up with Leonardo Tavares, but they lost against Sebastián Decoud and Carlos Salamanca in the first round.
Dominik Meffert and Philipp Oswald won in the final 6–7(4), 7–6(6), [10–5], against Gero Kretschmer and Alex Satschko

== Seeds ==
1. (Germany) Dominik Meffert / (Austria) Philipp Oswald (champions)
2. (Brazil) João Souza / (Portugal) Leonardo Tavares (first round)
3. (Argentina) Martín Alund / (Argentina) Diego Cristín (first round)
4. (Brazil) Fernando Romboli / (Brazil) Márcio Torres (first round)

== Draw ==
=== Key ===
- Q = Qualifier
- WC = Wild card
- LL = Lucky loser
- Alt = Alternate
- SE = Special exempt
- PR = Protected ranking
- ITF = ITF entry
- JE = Junior exempt
- w/o = Walkover
- r = Retired
- d = Defaulted
- SR = Special ranking

=== Draw ===
First round

Quarterfinals

Semifinals

Finals

1
- (Germany) D Meffert
- (Austria) P Oswald
6
6

- (Colombia) JS Cabal
- (Colombia) E Struvay
3
4

1
- (Germany) D Meffert
- (Austria) P Oswald
6
7

- (Austria) M Slanar
- (Montenegro) G Tošić
6
3
[10]

- (Austria) M Slanar
- (Montenegro) G Tošić
4
6^{5}

- (Peru) M Echazú
- (Romania) C Gârd
2
6
[6]

1
- (Germany) D Meffert
- (Austria) P Oswald
6
6

3
- (Argentina) M Alund
- (Argentina) D Cristín
6
4
[4]

- (France) J Dasnières de Veigy
- (France) A Sidorenko
1
1

WC
- (Argentina) C Benedetti
- (Argentina) G Gaudio
4
6
[10]

WC
- (Argentina) C Benedetti
- (Argentina) G Gaudio
w/o

- (France) J Dasnières de Veigy
- (France) A Sidorenko
7
7

- (France) J Dasnières de Veigy
- (France) A Sidorenko

WC
- (Colombia) E Gómez
- (Colombia) W Valarezo
5
6^{6}

1
- (Germany) D Meffert
- (Austria) P Oswald
6^{4}
7
[10]

- (Spain) A Brugués Davi
- (Colombia) A González
1
3

- (Germany) G Kretschmer
- (Germany) A Satschko
7
6^{6}
[5]

- (Germany) G Kretschmer
- (Germany) A Satschko
6
6

- (Germany) G Kretschmer
- (Germany) A Satschko
3
7
[10]

- (Hungary) A Balázs
- (Italy) R Ghedin
6
6

- (Hungary) A Balázs
- (Italy) R Ghedin
6
6^{4}
[4]

4
- (Brazil) F Romboli
- (Brazil) M Torres
1
4

- (Germany) G Kretschmer
- (Germany) A Satschko
6
6

WC
(Colombia) M Quintero
(Colombia) S Serrano
2
6^{2}

- (Argentina) S Decoud
- (Colombia) C Salamanca
4
3

- (Argentina) F Bagnis
- (Argentina) G Pella
6
7

- (Argentina) F Bagnis
- (Argentina) G Pella
5
3

- (Argentina) S Decoud
- (Colombia) C Salamanca
6
7

- (Argentina) S Decoud
- (Colombia) C Salamanca
7
6

2
- (Brazil) J Souza
- (Portugal) L Tavares
3
5
