= 2010 Seguros Bolívar Open Pereira =

- Date: April 12–18
- Edition: 2nd
- Location: Pereira, Colombia

Champions

Singles
- (Colombia) Santiago Giraldo

Doubles
- (Germany) Dominik Meffert / (Austria) Philipp Oswald
← 2009 ·	Seguros Bolívar Open Pereira	· 2011 →

The 2010 Seguros Bolívar Open Pereira was a professional tennis tournament played on hard courts. It was part of the 2010 ATP Challenger Tour. It took place in Pereira, Colombia between 12 and 18 April 2010.

== ATP entrants ==
=== Seeds ===
Nationality	Player	Ranking*	Seeding
COL	Santiago Giraldo	83	1
ITA	Paolo Lorenzi	90	2
CHI	Paul Capdeville	151	3
BRA	João Souza	153	4
ARG	Sebastián Decoud	164	5
ARG	Gastón Gaudio	170	6
COL	Carlos Salamanca	177	7
FRA	Alexandre Sidorenko	188	8

- Rankings are as of April 5, 2010.

=== Other entrants ===
The following players received wildcards into the singles main draw:

- (United States) Carlton Fiorentino
- (Argentina) Gastón Gaudio
- (Ecuador) Emilio Gómez
- (Colombia) Eduardo Struvay

The following players received entry from the qualifying draw:

- (Argentina) Facundo Bagnis
- (Ecuador) Iván Endara
- (Colombia) Juan Sebastián Gómez
- (Colombia) Michael Quintero

The following players received special exempt into the singles main draw:

- (Colombia) Juan Sebastián Cabal

== Champions ==
=== Singles ===
(Colombia) Santiago Giraldo def. (Italy) Paolo Lorenzi, 6–3, 6–3

=== Doubles ===
(Germany) Dominik Meffert / (Austria) Philipp Oswald def. (Germany) Gero Kretschmer / (Germany) Alex Satschko, 6–7(4), 7–6(6), [10–5]
