= 2015 Seguros Bolívar Open Pereira – Doubles =

Doubles
- 2015 Seguros Bolívar Open Pereira
- 2014 Champion: (Colombia) Nicolás Barrientos (Colombia) Eduardo Struvay

Events
Singles	Doubles
- Seguros Bolívar Open Pereira

Nicolás Barrientos and Eduardo Struvay are the defending champions.

== Seeds ==
1. (Mexico) César Ramírez / (Mexico) Miguel Ángel Reyes-Varela (first round)
2. (Italy) Paolo Lorenzi / (Brazil) João Souza (first round)
3. (Colombia) Nicolás Barrientos / (Colombia) Eduardo Struvay (first round)
4. (Argentina) Andrés Molteni / (Brazil) Fernando Romboli (champions)

== Draw ==
Key

- Q = Qualifier
- WC = Wild card
- LL = Lucky loser
- Alt = Alternate
- ITF = ITF entry
- PR = Protected ranking
- SR = Special ranking
- SE = Special exempt
- JE = Junior exempt
- JR = Junior Accelerator Programme entrant
- CO = College Accelerator Programme entrant
- NG = Next Gen Accelerator Program entrant
- w/o = Walkover
- r = Retired
- d = Defaulted

First round
1	(Mexico) C Ramírez (Mexico) MÁ Reyes-Varela	2	6^{4}
(Colombia) A González (Ecuador) G Lapentti	6	7^{7}
WC	(Ecuador) I Endara (Colombia) DE Galán	7^{7}	0	[10]
(Argentina) JI Londero (Argentina) F Mena	6^{5}	6	[5]
3	(Colombia) N Barrientos (Colombia) E Struvay	7^{8}	5	[8]
(Brazil) G Clezar (Brazil) F Neis	6^{6}	7	[10]
(Ecuador) G Escobar (Ecuador) E Gómez	3	4
(El Salvador) M Arévalo (Colombia) JS Gómez	6	6
(Venezuela) LD Martínez (United Kingdom) D Walsh	6	3	[10]
(Argentina) F Coria (Chile) G Lama	3	6	[6]
WC	(Colombia) Juan Montes (Colombia) Felipe Rojas	1	1
4	(Argentina) A Molteni (Brazil) F Romboli	6	6
WC	(Colombia) Felipe Escobar (Colombia) A Gómez	6	3	[9]
(Belgium) Y Reuter (Spain) J Samper-Montaña	3	6	[11]
(Italy) R Marcora (Italy) G Quinzi	6	7^{8}
2	(Italy) P Lorenzi (Brazil) J Souza	4	6^{6}

Quarterfinals
(Colombia) A González (Ecuador) G Lapentti	3	3
WC	(Ecuador) I Endara (Colombia) DE Galán	6	6
(Brazil) G Clezar (Brazil) F Neis	3	7^{7}	[12]
(El Salvador) M Arévalo (Colombia) JS Gómez	6	6^{2}	[14]
(Venezuela) LD Martínez (United Kingdom) D Walsh	6^{4}	7^{7}	[7]
4	(Argentina) A Molteni (Brazil) F Romboli	7	6^{1}	[10]
(Belgium) Y Reuter (Spain) J Samper-Montaña	6	6
(Italy) R Marcora (Italy) G Quinzi	4	2

Semifinals
WC	(Ecuador) I Endara (Colombia) DE Galán	3	0
(El Salvador) M Arévalo (Colombia) JS Gómez	6	6
4	(Argentina) A Molteni (Brazil) F Romboli	6^{2}	7	[10]
(Belgium) Y Reuter (Spain) J Samper-Montaña	7^{7}	5	[3]

Final
(El Salvador) M Arévalo (Colombia) JS Gómez	4	6^{12}
4	(Argentina) A Molteni (Brazil) F Romboli	6	7^{14}
