= 2011 Seguros Bolívar Open Pereira =

- Date: April 4 – April 10
- Edition: 3rd
- Location: Pereira, Colombia

Champions

Singles
- (Italy) Paolo Lorenzi

Doubles
- (Uruguay) Marcel Felder / (Colombia) Carlos Salamanca
← 2010 ·	Seguros Bolívar Open Pereira	· 2012 →

The 2011 Seguros Bolívar Open Pereira was a professional tennis tournament played on Hard courts. It was part of the 2011 ATP Challenger Tour. It took place in Pereira, Colombia between 4 and 10 April 2011.

== ATP entrants ==
=== Seeds ===
Nationality	Player	Ranking*	Seeding
COL	Alejandro Falla	108	1
ARG	Eduardo Schwank	121	2
BRA	João Souza	125	3
FRA	Éric Prodon	129	4
ITA	Paolo Lorenzi	154	5
ARG	Diego Junqueira	155	6
BRA	Rogério Dutra da Silva	159	7
ARG	Leonardo Mayer	163	8

- Rankings are as of March 21, 2011.

=== Other entrants ===
The following players received wildcards into the singles main draw:

- (Colombia) Nicolás Barrientos
- (Argentina) Manuel Barros
- (Colombia) Sebastián López
- (Colombia) Eduardo Struvay

The following players received entry from the qualifying draw:

- (Ecuador) Júlio César Campozano
- (Argentina) Guillermo Durán
- (Argentina) Marco Trungelliti
- (United States) Denis Zivkovic

== Champions ==
=== Singles ===
(Italy) Paolo Lorenzi def. (Brazil) Rogério Dutra da Silva, 7–5, 6–2

=== Doubles ===
(Uruguay) Marcel Felder / (Colombia) Carlos Salamanca def. (Colombia) Alejandro Falla / (Colombia) Eduardo Struvay, 7–6(5), 6–4
