= 2012 Seguros Bolívar Open Pereira =

- Date: 9 – 15 April
- Edition: 4th
- Surface: Clay
- Location: Pereira, Colombia

Champions

Singles
- (Colombia) Carlos Salamanca

Doubles
- (Argentina) Martín Alund / (Argentina) Guido Pella
← 2011 ·	Seguros Bolívar Open Pereira	· 2013 →

The 2012 Seguros Bolívar Open Pereira was a professional tennis tournament played on clay courts. It was the fourth edition of the tournament which was part of the 2012 ATP Challenger Tour. It took place in Pereira, Colombia between 9 and 15 April 2012.

== Singles main draw entrants ==
=== Seeds ===
Country	Player	Rank^{1}	Seed
COL	Santiago Giraldo	55	1
COL	Alejandro Falla	56	2
ESP	Rubén Ramírez Hidalgo	125	3
ARG	Martín Alund	169	4
DOM	Víctor Estrella	203	5
ARG	Guido Pella	204	6
COL	Carlos Salamanca	245	7
COL	Eduardo Struvay	247	8

- ^{1} Rankings are as of April 2, 2012.

=== Other entrants ===
The following players received wildcards into the singles main draw:

- (Colombia) Felipe Escobar
- (Colombia) Alejandro Falla
- (Chile) Nicolás Massú
- (Colombia) Sebastian Serrano

The following players received entry from the qualifying draw:

- (Colombia) Nicolás Barrientos
- (Ecuador) Júlio César Campozano
- (Colombia) Michael Quintero
- (Montenegro) Goran Tošić

== Champions ==
=== Singles ===
- (Colombia) Carlos Salamanca def. (Spain) Rubén Ramírez Hidalgo, 5–7, 6–2, 6–1

=== Doubles ===
- (Argentina) Martín Alund / (Argentina) Guido Pella def. (Argentina) Sebastián Decoud / (Spain) Rubén Ramírez Hidalgo, 6–3, 2–6, [10–5]
