= 2014 Seguros Bolívar Open Pereira – Doubles =

Doubles
- 2014 Seguros Bolívar Open Pereira

Final
- Champions: (Colombia) Nicolás Barrientos (Colombia) Eduardo Struvay
- Runners-up: (Argentina) Guido Pella (Argentina) Horacio Zeballos
- Score: 3–6, 6–3, [11–9]

Events
Singles	Doubles
- Seguros Bolívar Open Pereira

Nicolás Barrientos and Eduardo Struvay were the defending champions and successfully defended their title by defeating Guido Pella and Horacio Zeballos 3–6, 6–3, [11–9] in the final.

== Seeds ==
1. (United States) Kevin King / (Colombia) Juan Carlos Spir (semifinals)
2. (Argentina) Guido Pella / (Argentina) Horacio Zeballos (final)
3. (Colombia) Nicolás Barrientos / (Colombia) Eduardo Struvay (champions)
4. (United States) Chase Buchanan / (United States) Austin Krajicek (quarterfinals)

== Draw ==
Key

- Q = Qualifier
- WC = Wild card
- LL = Lucky loser
- Alt = Alternate
- ITF = ITF entry
- PR = Protected ranking
- SR = Special ranking
- SE = Special exempt
- JE = Junior exempt
- JR = Junior Accelerator Programme entrant
- CO = College Accelerator Programme entrant
- NG = Next Gen Accelerator Program entrant
- w/o = Walkover
- r = Retired
- d = Defaulted

=== Draw ===
First round
1	(United States) K King (Colombia) JC Spir	6	6
WC	(Colombia) Felipe Escobar (Colombia) Felipe Mantilla	2	0
(Ecuador) G Escobar (Mexico) C Ramírez	0	6^{4}
(Brazil) M Demoliner (Brazil) J Souza	6	7^{7}
3	(Colombia) N Barrientos (Colombia) E Struvay	6^{7}	6	[10]
(Venezuela) R Maytín (Argentina) A Molteni	7^{9}	2	[8]
(Sweden) C Lindell (Argentina) JI Londero	6^{7}	4
(Dominican Republic) V Estrella Burgos (Puerto Rico) A Llompart	7^{9}	6
(Bolivia) H Dellien (Peru) S Galdós	6	0	[10]
(Italy) M Bortolotti (Italy) P Lorenzi	4	6	[3]
(Chile) N Jarry (Spain) D Muñoz de la Nava	6	3	[10]
4	(United States) C Buchanan (United States) A Krajicek	4	6	[12]
WC	(Chile) G Lama (Venezuela) LD Martínez	7	4	[6]
WC	(Dominican Republic) J Hernández (Argentina) M Trungelliti	5	6	[10]
(Croatia) T Androić (Croatia) N Mektić	1	4
2	(Argentina) G Pella (Argentina) H Zeballos	6	6

Quarterfinals
1	(United States) K King (Colombia) JC Spir	6	3	[10]
(Brazil) M Demoliner (Brazil) J Souza	3	6	[5]
3	(Colombia) N Barrientos (Colombia) E Struvay	7	2	[12]
(Dominican Republic) V Estrella Burgos (Puerto Rico) A Llompart	5	6	[10]
(Bolivia) H Dellien (Peru) S Galdós	7^{7}	7^{7}
4	(United States) C Buchanan (United States) A Krajicek	6^{2}	6^{4}
WC	(Dominican Republic) J Hernández (Argentina) M Trungelliti	3	1
2	(Argentina) G Pella (Argentina) H Zeballos	6	6

Semifinals
1	(United States) K King (Colombia) JC Spir	4	6^{4}
3	(Colombia) N Barrientos (Colombia) E Struvay	6	7^{7}
(Bolivia) H Dellien (Peru) S Galdós	4	2
2	(Argentina) G Pella (Argentina) H Zeballos	6	6

Final
3	(Colombia) N Barrientos (Colombia) E Struvay	3	6	[11]
2	(Argentina) G Pella (Argentina) H Zeballos	6	3	[9]
