= 2009 Seguros Bolívar Open Pereira =

- Date: April 27 – March 03
- Edition: 1st
- Location: Pereira, Colombia

Champions

Singles
- (Colombia) Alejandro Falla

Doubles
- (Dominican Republic) Víctor Estrella / (Brazil) João Souza
Seguros Bolívar Open Pereira	· 2010 →

The 2009 Seguros Bolívar Open Pereira was a professional tennis tournament played on outdoor red clay courts. It was part of the 2009 ATP Challenger Tour. It took place in Pereira, Colombia between April 27 and March 3, 2009.

== Singles entrants ==
=== Seeds ===
Nationality	Player	Ranking*	Seeding
ARG	Horacio Zeballos	130	1
COL	Santiago Giraldo	132	2
ECU	Giovanni Lapentti	175	3
ARG	Mariano Puerta	191	4
COL	Alejandro Falla	205	5
DOM	Víctor Estrella	225	6
BRA	Caio Zampieri	241	7
BRA	João Souza	245	8

- Rankings are as of April 20, 2009.

=== Other entrants ===
The following players received wildcards into the singles main draw:

- (Colombia) Andrés Herrera
- (Colombia) Felipe Mantilla
- (Colombia) Eduardo Struvay
- (Argentina) Mariano Zabaleta

The following players received entry from the qualifying draw:

- (Colombia) Juan Flores
- (Colombia) Sat Galan
- (Colombia) Sebastián López
- (United Kingdom) James Ward

== Champions ==
=== Men's singles ===
(Colombia) Alejandro Falla def. (Argentina) Horacio Zeballos, 6–4, 4–6, 6–2.

=== Men's doubles ===
(Dominican Republic) Víctor Estrella / (Brazil) João Souza def. (Colombia) Juan Sebastián Cabal / (Colombia) Alejandro Falla, 6–4, 6–4.
