= 2014 Seguros Bolívar Open Pereira =

- Date: 22–28 September
- Edition: 6th
- Surface: Clay
- Location: Pereira, Colombia

Champions

Singles
- Víctor Estrella Burgos (DOM)

Doubles
- Nicolás Barrientos (COL) / Eduardo Struvay (COL)
- Seguros Bolívar Open Pereira

The 2014 Seguros Bolívar Open Pereira was a professional tennis tournament played on clay courts. It was the sixth edition of the tournament which was part of the 2014 ATP Challenger Tour. It took place in Pereira, Colombia between 22 and 28 September 2014.

== Singles main-draw entrants ==
=== Seeds ===
Country	Player	Rank^{1}	Seed
DOM	Víctor Estrella Burgos	72	1
COL	Alejandro Falla	75	2
ITA	Paolo Lorenzi	79	3
COL	Alejandro González	89	4
BRA	João Souza	109	5
ARG	Horacio Zeballos	114	6
ARG	Guido Pella	158	7
USA	Austin Krajicek	164	8

- ^{1} Rankings are as of September 15, 2014.

=== Other entrants ===
The following players received wildcards into the singles main draw:

- (Colombia) Alejandro Falla
- (Colombia) Daniel Elahi Galán
- (Colombia) Juan Carlos Spir
- (Colombia) Eduardo Struvay

The following players received entry from the qualifying draw:

- (Ecuador) Iván Endara
- (Dominican Republic) José Hernández
- (Brazil) Wilson Leite
- (Peru) Juan Pablo Varillas

The following player received entry by a special exempt:

- (Ecuador) Gonzalo Escobar

== Champions ==
=== Singles ===
- (Dominican Republic) Víctor Estrella Burgos def. (Brazil) João Souza, 7–6^{(7–5)}, 3–6, 7–6^{(8–6)}

=== Doubles ===
- (Colombia) Nicolás Barrientos / (Colombia) Eduardo Struvay def. (Argentina) Guido Pella / (Argentina) Horacio Zeballos, 3–6, 6–3, [11–9]
