= Paolo Lorenzi =

Italian tennis player

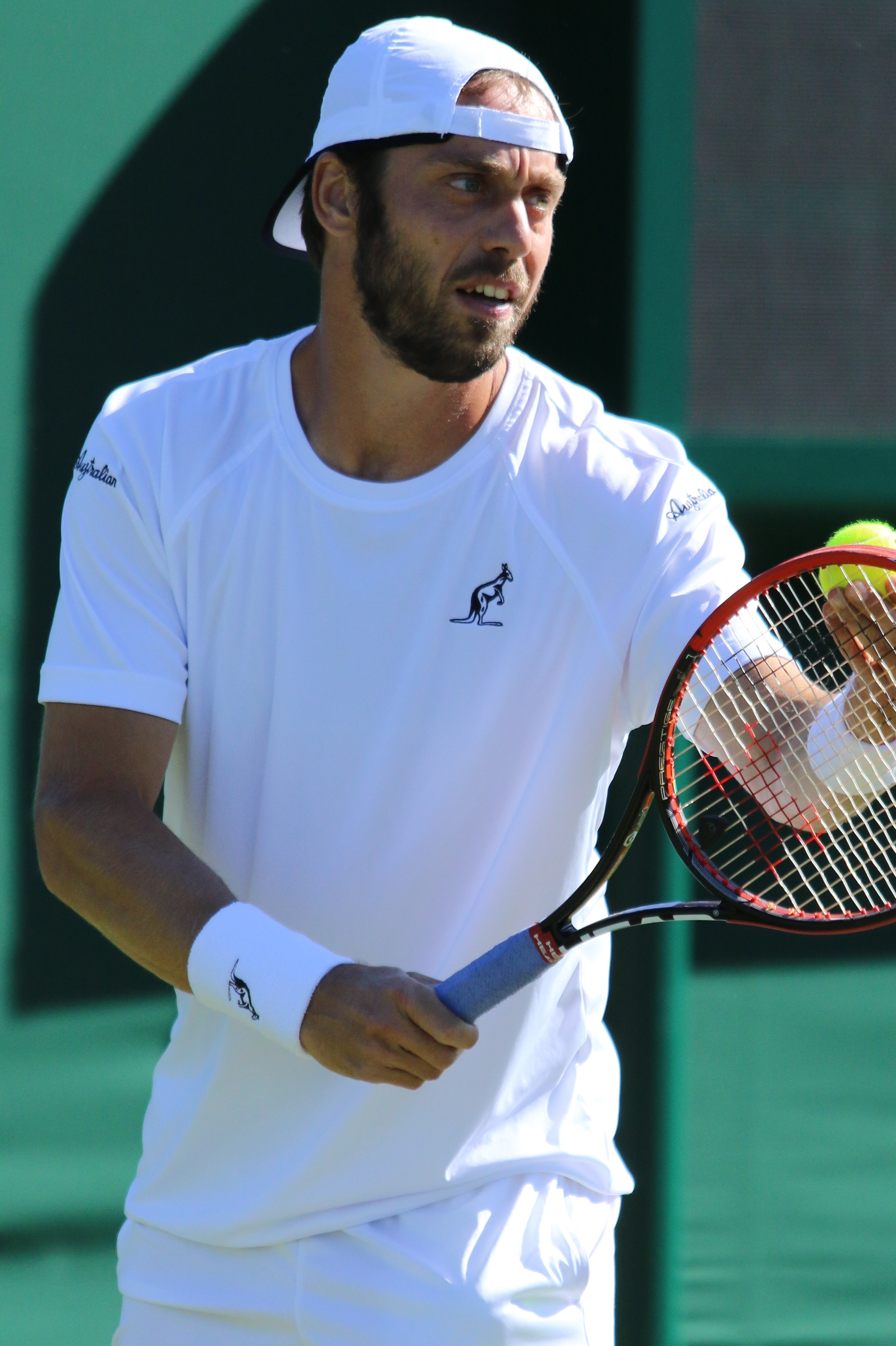
- Lorenzi at the 2018 Wimbledon Championships
- Country (sports): Italy
- Residence: Sarasota, Florida, United States
- Born: 15 December 1981 (age 44) Rome, Italy
- Height: 1.83 m (6 ft 0 in)
- Turned pro: 2003
- Retired: 2021
- Plays: Right-handed (two-handed backhand)
- Prize money: $5,207,934

Singles
- Career record: 110–185
- Career titles: 1
- Highest ranking: No. 33 (15 May 2017)

Grand Slam singles results
- Australian Open: 2R (2015, 2017)
- French Open: 2R (2017)
- Wimbledon: 2R (2017, 2018)
- US Open: 4R (2017)

Other tournaments
- Olympic Games: 2R (2016)

Doubles
- Career record: 44–108
- Career titles: 1
- Highest ranking: No. 82 (29 January 2018)

Grand Slam doubles results
- Australian Open: 2R (2013)
- French Open: QF (2017)
- Wimbledon: 1R (2011, 2012, 2013, 2014, 2016, 2017, 2018)
- US Open: 2R (2017)
- Last updated on: 22 November 2021.

Paolo Lorenzi (Italian pronunciation: [ˈpaːolo loˈrɛntsi]; born 15 December 1981) is an Italian former professional tennis player and former Italian number 1. He was coached by Claudio Galoppini. At the age of 34 years and seven months, Lorenzi became the oldest first-time champion in ATP history when he won the title at the 2016 Generali Open Kitzbühel.

== Career ==
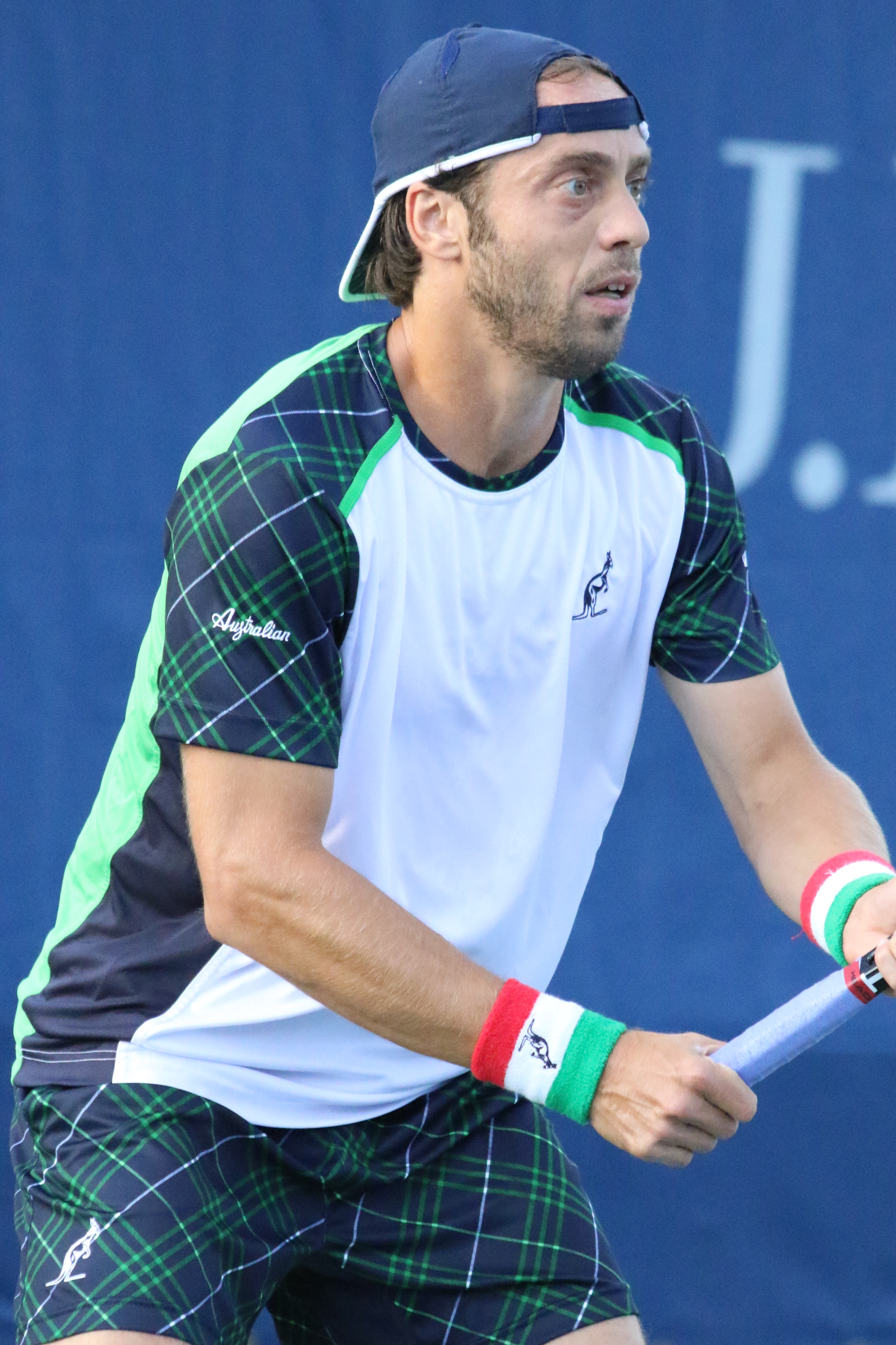
Lorenzi, 2016

Lorenzi reached his first ATP World Tour final at the age of 32, in São Paulo. Here, at the 2014 Brasil Open, the Italian reached the semifinals of an ATP Tour tournament for the first time, upsetting Juan Mónaco in three sets; then progressing to the final after the retirement of Tommy Haas in the second set of their semifinal match. He went on to lose the final to Argentine Federico Delbonis in three sets.

On 22 May 2015, after defeating Matthew Ebden in the quarterfinals of the Eskişehir Cup, Lorenzi became the third player ever to win 300 matches in the ATP Challenger Tour tournaments.

At age 34, on 24 July 2016, Lorenzi won his maiden ATP title, defeating Nikoloz Basilashvili in the final at the Generali Open Kitzbühel and becoming the oldest first-time champion in ATP history. On 1 August 2016 he overtook Fabio Fognini becoming the new Italian No. 1 in the Association of Tennis Professionals ATP ranking at the age of 34 years old and 8 months at No. 40.

He was the 32nd seed in the 2017 Miami Open but lost in the 2nd round. He also entered 2017 Wimbledon Championships as the 32nd seed where he recorded his first win by beating Horacio Zeballos in four sets, he then advanced to the 2nd round where he lost to Jared Donaldson in 4 sets.

Lorenzi recorded the best grand slam singles performance of his career, reaching the round of 16 at the 2017 US Open. He lost to eventual runner-up Kevin Anderson in four sets.

In 2018, Lorenzi claimed his 20th Challenger title in Sopot, Poland.

Lorenzi lost in the third round of qualifying of the 2019 US Open, but received an invitation to compete in the main draw as a lucky loser upon the withdrawal of Kevin Anderson due to injury. In the first round, he came from two sets down to win in five against Zachary Svajda. In the second round he defeated Miomir Kecmanović in five sets to advance to the third round of the US Open for the second time in his career. He was defeated by Stan Wawrinka in the third round.

At age 39, on 26 August 2021, Lorenzi retired from professional tennis. His final match was a loss to Maxime Janvier in the second round of the 2021 US Open Qualifying Tournament.

== ATP career finals ==
=== Singles: 4 (1 title, 3 runner-ups) ===
Legend Grand Slam tournaments (0–0) ATP World Tour Finals (0–0) ATP World Tour Masters 1000 (0–0) ATP World Tour 500 Series (0–0) ATP World Tour 250 Series (1–3)	Titles by surface Hard (0–0) Clay (1–3) Grass (0–0)	Titles by setting Outdoor (1–2) Indoor (0–1)

Result	W–L	Date	Tournament	Tier	Surface	Opponent	Score
Loss	0–1	Mar 2014	Brasil Open, Brazil	250 Series	Clay (i)	(Argentina) Federico Delbonis	6–4, 3–6, 4–6
Win	1–1	Jul 2016	Austrian Open Kitzbühel, Austria	250 Series	Clay	(Georgia (country)) Nikoloz Basilashvili	6–3, 6–4
Loss	1–2	Feb 2017	Ecuador Open, Ecuador	250 Series	Clay	(Dominican Republic) Víctor Estrella Burgos	7–6^{(7–2)}, 5–7, 6–7^{(6–8)}
Loss	1–3	Jul 2017	Croatia Open, Croatia	250 Series	Clay	(Russia) Andrey Rublev	4–6, 2–6

=== Doubles: 3 (1 title, 2 runner-ups) ===
Legend Grand Slam tournaments (0–0) ATP World Tour Finals (0–0) ATP World Tour Masters 1000 (0–0) ATP World Tour 500 Series (0–0) ATP World Tour 250 Series (1–2)	Titles by surface Hard (0–0) Clay (1–2) Grass (0–0)	Titles by setting Outdoor (1–1) Indoor (0–1)

Result	W–L	Date	Tournament	Tier	Surface	Partner	Opponents	Score
Win	1–0	Feb 2013	Chile Open, Chile	250 Series	Clay	(Italy) Potito Starace	(Argentina) Juan Mónaco (Spain) Rafael Nadal	6–2, 6–4
Loss	1–1	Feb 2015	Brasil Open, Brazil	250 Series	Clay (i)	(Argentina) Diego Schwartzman	(Colombia) Juan Sebastián Cabal (Colombia) Robert Farah	4–6, 2–6
Loss	1–2	Feb 2016	Argentina Open, Argentina	250 Series	Clay	(Spain) Íñigo Cervantes Huegun	(Colombia) Juan Sebastián Cabal (Colombia) Robert Farah	3–6, 0–6

== Challenger and Futures finals ==
=== Singles: 44 (25–19) ===
Legend (singles) ATP Challenger Tour (21–18) ITF Futures Tour (4–1)	Titles by surface Hard (4–3) Clay (21–16) Grass (0–0) Carpet (0–0)

Result	W–L	Date	Tournament	Tier	Surface	Opponent	Score
Loss	0–1	Sep 2002	Italy F5, Selargius	Futures	Hard	(France) Rodolphe Cadart	0–6, 3–6
Win	1–1	Aug 2003	Croatia F3, Našice	Futures	Clay	(Hungary) Sebő Kiss	4–6, 6–0, 6–0
Win	2–1	Apr 2005	Australia F4, Frankston	Futures	Clay	(Greece) Vasilis Mazarakis	6–4, 7–6^{(7–4)}
Loss	2–2	Apr 2006	San Luis Potosí, Mexico	Challenger	Clay	(Austria) Rainer Eitzinger	4–6, 7–6^{(7–5)}, 5–7
Win	3–2	Sep 2006	Tarragona, Spain	Challenger	Clay	(Morocco) Younes El Aynaoui	6–4, 7–6^{(7–4)}
Win	4–2	Feb 2008	Italy F2, Trento	Futures	Hard (i)	(Austria) Philipp Oswald	7–6^{(9–7)}, 7–6^{(9–7)}
Win	5–2	Jun 2008	Alessandria, Italy	Challenger	Clay	(Italy) Simone Vagnozzi	4–6, 7–6^{(7–5)}, 7–6^{(7–4)}
Win	6–2	Feb 2009	Ivory Coast F1, Abidjan	Futures	Hard	(Ivory Coast) Valentin Sanon	6–3, 6–4
Loss	6–3	Apr 2009	San Luis Potosí, Mexico	Challenger	Clay	(Colombia) Santiago Giraldo	2–6, 7–6^{(7–3)}, 2–6
Loss	6–4	May 2009	Tenerife, Spain	Challenger	Hard	(Switzerland) Marco Chiudinelli	3–6, 4–6
Win	7–4	Jun 2009	Reggio Emilia, Italy	Challenger	Clay	(Monaco) Jean-René Lisnard	7–5, 1–6, 6–2
Win	8–4	Jul 2009	Rijeka, Croatia	Challenger	Clay	(Slovenia) Blaž Kavčič	6–3, 7–6^{(7–2)}
Win	9–4	Sep 2009	Ljubljana, Slovenia	Challenger	Clay	(Slovenia) Grega Žemlja	1–6, 7–6^{(7–4)}, 6–2
Loss	9–5	May 2009	Tarragona, Spain	Challenger	Clay	(Spain) Daniel Gimeno Traver	4–6, 0–6
Loss	9–6	Apr 2010	Pereira, Colombia	Challenger	Clay	(Colombia) Santiago Giraldo	3–6, 3–6
Win	10–6	Jul 2010	Rimini, Italy	Challenger	Clay	(Argentina) Federico Delbonis	6–2, 6–0
Win	11–6	Apr 2011	Pereira, Colombia	Challenger	Clay	(Brazil) Rogério Dutra Silva	7–5, 6–2
Win	12–6	Sep 2011	Ljubljana, Slovenia	Challenger	Clay	(Slovenia) Grega Žemlja	6–2, 6–4
Loss	12–7	Mar 2012	Salinas, Ecuador	Challenger	Clay	(Argentina) Guido Pella	6–1, 5–7, 3–6
Loss	12–8	Mar 2012	Guadalajara, Mexico	Challenger	Hard	(Brazil) Thiago Alves	3–6, 6–7^{(4–7)}
Loss	12–9	Apr 2012	San Luis Potosí, Mexico	Challenger	Clay	(Spain) Rubén Ramírez Hidalgo	6–3, 3–6, 4–6
Loss	12–10	Apr 2012	Sarasota, USA	Challenger	Clay	(United States) Sam Querrey	1–6, 7–6^{(7–3)}, 3–6
Win	13–10	Aug 2012	Cordenons, Italy	Challenger	Clay	(Spain) Daniel Gimeno Traver	7–6^{(7–5)}, 6–3
Loss	13–11	Aug 2012	Todi, Italy	Challenger	Clay	(Russia) Andrey Kuznetsov	3–6, 0–2 ret.
Win	14–11	Nov 2012	Medellín, Colombia	Challenger	Clay	(Argentina) Leonardo Mayer	7–6^{(7–5)}, 6–7^{(4–7)}, 6–4
Loss	14–12	Nov 2012	Guayaquil, Ecuador	Challenger	Clay	(Argentina) Leonardo Mayer	2–6, 4–6
Loss	14–13	Jan 2014	Bucaramanga, Colombia	Challenger	Clay	(Colombia) Alejandro Falla	5–7, 1–6
Win	15–13	Apr 2014	San Luis Potosí, Mexico	Challenger	Clay	(Spain) Adrián Menéndez Maceiras	6–1, 6–3
Win	16–13	Oct 2014	Cali, Colombia	Challenger	Clay	(Dominican Republic) Víctor Estrella Burgos	4–6, 6–3, 6–3
Loss	16–14	Nov 2014	Guayaquil, Ecuador	Challenger	Clay	(Uruguay) Pablo Cuevas	w/o
Win	17–14	May 2015	Eskişehir, Turkey	Challenger	Hard	(Spain) Íñigo Cervantes Huegun	7–6^{(7–4)}, 7–6^{(7–5)}
Win	18–14	Aug 2015	Cortina, Italy	Challenger	Clay	(Argentina) Máximo González	6–3, 7–5
Win	19–14	Oct 2015	Pereira, Colombia	Challenger	Clay	(Colombia) Alejandro González	4–6, 6–3, 6–4
Win	20–14	Oct 2015	Medellín, Colombia	Challenger	Clay	(Chile) Gonzalo Lama	7–6^{(7–3)}, 2–0 ret.
Loss	20–15	Nov 2015	Bogotá, Colombia	Challenger	Clay	(Colombia) Eduardo Struvay	3–6, 6–4, 4–6
Win	21–15	Jan 2016	Canberra, Australia	Challenger	Hard	(Croatia) Ivan Dodig	6–2, 6–4
Loss	21–16	Jan 2016	Bucaramanga, Colombia	Challenger	Clay	(Austria) Gerald Melzer	3–6, 1–6
Win	22–16	Jun 2016	Caltanissetta, Italy	Challenger	Clay	(Italy) Matteo Donati	6–3, 4–6, 7–6^{(9–7)}
Win	23–16	Jun 2017	Caltanissetta, Italy	Challenger	Clay	(Italy) Alessandro Giannessi	6–4, 6–2
Loss	23–17	Jun 2018	L'Aquila, Italy	Challenger	Clay	(Argentina) Facundo Bagnis	6–2, 3–6, 4–6
Win	24–17	Aug 2018	Sopot, Poland	Challenger	Clay	(Spain) Daniel Gimeno Traver	7–6^{(7–2)}, 6–7^{(5–7)}, 6–3
Win	25–17	Aug 2018	Cordenons, Italy	Challenger	Clay	(Hungary) Máté Valkusz	6–3, 3–6, 6–4
Loss	25–18	May 2019	Savannah, USA	Challenger	Clay	(Argentina) Federico Coria	3–6, 6–4, 2–6
Loss	25–19	Aug 2019	Manerbio, Italy	Challenger	Clay	(Italy) Federico Gaio	3–6, 1–6

=== Doubles: 12 (9–5) ===
Legend (doubles) ATP Challenger Tour (7–4) ITF Futures Tour (2–1)	Titles by surface Hard (2–2) Clay (7–3) Grass (0–0) Carpet (0–0)

Result	W–L	Date	Tournament	Tier	Surface	Partner	Opponents	Score
Loss	0–1	Jan 2008	China F1, Shenzhen	Futures	Hard	(Italy) Giancarlo Petrazzuolo	(China) Yu Xinyuan (China) Zeng Shaoxuan	6–7^{(1–7)}, 6–7^{(3–7)}
Win	1–1	Jan 2008	China F2, Dongguan	Futures	Hard	(Italy) Giancarlo Petrazzuolo	(Denmark) Frederik Nielsen (Denmark) Rasmus Nørby	6–4, 7–6^{(7–1)}
Win	2–1	Feb 2008	Italy F2, Trento	Futures	Hard (i)	(Italy) Giancarlo Petrazzuolo	(France) Xavier Audouy (France) Ludovic Walter	6–3, 4–6, [10–8]
Loss	2–2	May 2008	Rome, Italy	Challenger	Clay	(Italy) Giancarlo Petrazzuolo	(Italy) Flavio Cipolla (Italy) Simone Vagnozzi	3–6, 3–6
Win	3–2	Jul 2008	San Benedetto, Italy	Challenger	Clay	(Brazil) Júlio Silva	(Romania) Cătălin-Ionuț Gârd (Austria) Max Raditschnigg	6–3, 7–5
Win	4–2	Aug 2009	Orbetello, Italy	Challenger	Clay	(Italy) Giancarlo Petrazzuolo	(Italy) Alessio di Mauro (Italy) Manuel Jorquera	7–6^{(7–5)}, 3–6, [10–6]
Win	5–2	Oct 2010	Asunción, Paraguay	Challenger	Clay	(Italy) Fabio Fognini	(Argentina) Carlos Berlocq (Argentina) Brian Dabul	6–3, 6–4
Win	6–2	Apr 2011	Barranquilla, Colombia	Challenger	Clay	(Italy) Flavio Cipolla	(Colombia) Alejandro Falla (Colombia) Eduardo Struvay	6–3, 6–4
Win	7–2	Jun 2011	Rijeka, Croatia	Challenger	Clay	(Brazil) Júlio Silva	(Croatia) Lovro Zovko (Croatia) Dino Marcan	6–3, 6–2
Loss	7–3	Jan 2012	Bucaramanga, Colombia	Challenger	Clay	(Spain) Miguel Ángel López Jaén	(Uruguay) Ariel Behar (Argentina) Horacio Zeballos	4–6, 6–7^{(5–7)}
Win	8–3	Aug 2015	Cortina, Italy	Challenger	Clay	(Italy) Matteo Viola	(Chinese Taipei) Lee Hsin-han (Italy) Alessandro Motti	6–7^{(5–7)}, 6–4, [10–3]
Loss	8–4	Oct 2015	Monterrey, Mexico	Challenger	Hard	(Brazil) Fernando Romboli	(Netherlands) Thiemo de Bakker (Netherlands) Mark Vervoort	w/o
Win	9–4	Apr 2019	Sarasota, USA	Challenger	Clay	(Uruguay) Martín Cuevas	(United Kingdom) Luke Bambridge (United Kingdom) Jonny O'Mara	7–6^{(7–5)}, 7–6^{(8–6)}
Loss	9–5	Apr 2021	Rome, Italy	Challenger	Clay	(Peru) Juan Pablo Varillas	(France) Sadio Doumbia (France) Fabien Reboul	6-7^{(5-7)}, 5-7

== Performance timelines ==
Key
W	F	SF	QF	#R	RR	Q#	DNQ	A	NH

(W) winner; (F) finalist; (SF) semifinalist; (QF) quarterfinalist; (#R) rounds 4, 3, 2, 1; (RR) round-robin stage; (Q#) qualification round; (DNQ) did not qualify; (A) absent; (NH) not held; (SR) strike rate (events won / competed); (W–L) win–loss record.
To avoid confusion and double counting, these charts are updated at the conclusion of a tournament or when the player's participation has ended.

=== Singles ===
Tournament	2007	2008	2009	2010	2011	2012	2013	2014	2015	2016	2017	2018	2019	2020	2021	W–L
Grand Slam tournaments
Australian Open	A	Q1	Q1	1R	A	1R	1R	A	2R	1R	2R	1R	Q3	Q2	Q1	2–7
French Open	Q3	Q2	Q3	1R	Q2	1R	1R	1R	1R	1R	2R	1R	Q1	Q1	Q1	1–7
Wimbledon	Q2	Q1	Q1	1R	Q1	1R	1R	1R	1R	1R	2R	2R	1R	NH	Q1	2–9
US Open	Q1	Q2	Q1	A	Q2	1R	1R	2R	1R	3R	4R	2R	3R	1R	Q2	9–9
Win–loss	0–0	0–0	0–0	0–3	0–0	0–4	0–4	1–3	1–4	2–4	6–4	2–4	2–2	0–1	0–0	14–33
Career statistics
Titles–Finals	0–0	0–0	0–0	0–0	0–0	0–0	0–0	0–1	0–0	1–0	0–2	0–0	0–0	0–0	0–0	1–3
Year-end ranking	294	207	84	143	108	64	109	64	68	40	43	109	115	146	260	

=== Doubles ===
Tournament	2010	2011	2012	2013	2014	2015	2016	2017	2018	W–L
Grand Slam tournaments
Australian Open	1R	A	A	2R	A	1R	1R	1R	1R	1–6
French Open	2R	A	1R	2R	A	A	1R	QF	1R	4–6
Wimbledon	A	1R	1R	1R	1R	A	1R	1R	1R	0–7
US Open	A	A	A	1R	A	A	1R	2R	A	1–3
Win–loss	1–2	0–1	0–2	2–4	0–1	0–1	0–4	3–4	0–3	6–22
