= Seguros Bolívar Open Pereira =

Defunct tennis tournament
- Location: Pereira, Colombia
- Category: ATP Challenger Tour
- Surface: Clay (red)
- Draw: 32S/32Q/16D
- Prize money: $50,000+H
- Website: Website

Current champions (2015)
- Singles: (Italy) Paolo Lorenzi
- Doubles: (Argentina) Andrés Molteni (Brazil) Fernando Romboli

The Seguros Bolívar Open Pereira was a professional tennis tournament played on outdoor red clay courts. It was part of the Association of Tennis Professionals (ATP) Challenger Tour. It was held annually in Pereira, Colombia, from 2009 until 2015.

== Past finals ==
=== Singles ===
| Year | Champion | Runner-up | Score |
|---|---|---|---|
| 2009 | (Colombia) Alejandro Falla | (Argentina) Horacio Zeballos | 6–4, 4–6, 6–2 |
| 2010 | (Colombia) Santiago Giraldo | (Italy) Paolo Lorenzi | 6–3, 6–3 |
| 2011 | (Italy) Paolo Lorenzi | (Brazil) Rogério Dutra da Silva | 7–5, 6–2 |
| 2012 | (Colombia) Carlos Salamanca | (Spain) Rubén Ramírez Hidalgo | 5–7, 6–2, 6–1 |
| 2013 | (Colombia) Santiago Giraldo | (Chile) Paul Capdeville | 6–2, 6–4 |
| 2014 | (Dominican Republic) Víctor Estrella Burgos | (Brazil) João Souza | 7–6^{(7–5)}, 3–6, 7–6^{(8–6)} |
| 2015 | (Italy) Paolo Lorenzi | (Colombia) Alejandro González | 4–6, 6–3, 6–4 |

=== Doubles ===
| Year | Champions | Runners-up | Score |
|---|---|---|---|
| 2009 | (Dominican Republic) Víctor Estrella (Brazil) João Souza | (Colombia) Juan Sebastián Cabal (Colombia) Alejandro Falla | 6–4, 6–4 |
| 2010 | (Germany) Dominik Meffert (Austria) Philipp Oswald | (Germany) Gero Kretschmer (Germany) Alex Satschko | 6–7(4), 7–6(6), [10–5] |
| 2011 | (Uruguay) Marcel Felder (Colombia) Carlos Salamanca | (Colombia) Alejandro Falla (Colombia) Eduardo Struvay | 7–6(5), 6–4 |
| 2012 | (Argentina) Martín Alund (Argentina) Guido Pella | (Argentina) Sebastián Decoud (Spain) Rubén Ramírez Hidalgo | 6–3, 2–6, [10–5] |
| 2013 | (Colombia) Nicolás Barrientos (Colombia) Eduardo Struvay | (Argentina) Facundo Bagnis (Argentina) Federico Delbonis | 3–6, 6–3, [10–6] |
| 2014 | (Colombia) Nicolás Barrientos (Colombia) Eduardo Struvay | (Argentina) Guido Pella (Argentina) Horacio Zeballos | 3–6, 6–3, [11–9] |
| 2015 | (Argentina) Andrés Molteni (Brazil) Fernando Romboli | (El Salvador) Marcelo Arévalo (Colombia) Juan Sebastián Gómez | 6-4, 7-6(12) |
