= Carlos Salamanca =

Colombian tennis player

- Country (sports): Colombia
- Residence: Bogotá, Colombia
- Born: 15 January 1983 (age 43) Bogotá, Colombia
- Height: 1.96 m (6 ft 5 in)
- Turned pro: 2001
- Plays: Left-handed (two-handed backhand)
- Prize money: US$338,323

Singles
- Career record: 3–5 (at ATP Tour level, Grand Slam level, and in Davis Cup)
- Career titles: 0
- Highest ranking: No. 137 (16 August 2010)

Grand Slam singles results
- French Open: Q2 (2011)
- Wimbledon: Q2 (2012)
- US Open: Q2 (2009)

Doubles
- Career record: 6–9 (at ATP Tour level, Grand Slam level, and in Davis Cup)
- Career titles: 0
- Highest ranking: No. 185 (8 September 2014)
Medal record
Representing Colombia
Men's tennis
South American Games
Silver medal – second place	2014 Santiago	Men's doubles
- Last updated on: 3 September 2021.

Carlos Salamanca Caicedo (Latin American Spanish: [ˈkaɾlos salaˈmaŋka kajˈseðo]; born 15 January 1983) is a Colombian professional tennis player.

== Junior Grand Slam finals ==
=== Doubles: 1 (1 title) ===
Result	Year	Tournament	Surface	Partner	Opponents	Score
Win	2001	French Open	Clay	(Colombia) Alejandro Falla	(Germany) Markus Bayer (Germany) Philipp Petzschner	3–6, 7–5, 6–4

== Performance timelines ==
Key
W	F	SF	QF	#R	RR	Q#	DNQ	A	NH

(W) winner; (F) finalist; (SF) semifinalist; (QF) quarterfinalist; (#R) rounds 4, 3, 2, 1; (RR) round-robin stage; (Q#) qualification round; (DNQ) did not qualify; (A) absent; (NH) not held; (SR) strike rate (events won / competed); (W–L) win–loss record.
To avoid confusion and double counting, these charts are updated at the conclusion of a tournament or when the player's participation has ended.

=== Singles ===
Tournament	2007	2008	2009	2010	2011	2012	2013	SR	W–L	Win %
Grand Slam tournaments
Australian Open	A	A	A	A	A	A	A	0 / 0	0–0	–
French Open	A	A	A	Q1	Q2	Q1	A	0 / 0	0–0	–
Wimbledon	Q1	A	A	A	A	Q2	A	0 / 0	0–0	–
US Open	A	A	Q2	Q1	Q1	Q1	Q1	0 / 0	0–0	–
Win–loss	0–0	0–0	0–0	0–0	0–0	0–0	0–0	0 / 0	0–0	–
ATP World Tour Masters 1000
Miami	A	A	A	A	Q1	A	A	0 / 0	0–0	–
Canada Masters	A	A	A	Q2	A	A	A	0 / 0	0–0	–
Win–loss	0–0	0–0	0–0	0–0	0–0	0–0	0–0	0 / 0	0–0	–

== ATP Challenger and ITF Futures finals ==
=== Singles: 25 (16–9) ===
Legend ATP Challenger (6–3) ITF Futures (10–6)	Finals by surface Hard (2–1) Clay (14–8) Grass (0–0) Carpet (0–0)

Result	W–L	Date	Tournament	Tier	Surface	Opponent	Score
Win	1–0	Oct 2001	Colombia F2, Bogotá	Futures	Clay	(Colombia) Michael Quintero Aguilar	7–6^{(7–4)}, 6–3
Win	2–0	Sep 2004	Bolivia F1, La Paz	Futures	Clay	(Argentina) Gustavo Marcaccio	3–2 ret.
Win	3–0	May 2005	Colombia F3, Cali	Futures	Clay	(Brazil) Bruno Soares	6–2, 6–2
Loss	3–1	May 2006	Colombia F3, Cali	Futures	Clay	(Colombia) Santiago Giraldo	4–6, 2–6
Win	4–1	Jul 2006	Cuenca, Ecuador	Challenger	Clay	(Ecuador) Giovanni Lapentti	4–6, 7–6^{(10–8)}, 7–5
Win	5–1	Jan 2007	Colombia F1, Manizales	Futures	Clay	(Colombia) Michael Quintero Aguilar	6–4, 6–4
Loss	5–2	Feb 2007	Colombia F2, Bucaramanga	Futures	Clay	(Colombia) Michael Quintero Aguilar	2–6, 3–6
Win	6–2	Jul 2007	Bogotá, Colombia	Challenger	Clay	(Brazil) Thomaz Bellucci	4–6, 6–3, 6–2
Loss	6–3	Nov 2008	El Salvador F2, La Libertad	Futures	Clay	(Chile) Hans Podlipnik Castillo	6–3, 4–5 ret.
Loss	6–4	Feb 2009	Bucaramanga, Colombia	Challenger	Clay	(Argentina) Horacio Zeballos	5–7, 2–6
Win	7–4	Feb 2009	Colombia F2, Cartagena	Futures	Hard	(Brazil) André Miele	6–3, 6–7^{(7–9)}, 6–4
Loss	7–5	Jun 2009	USA F13, Sacramento	Futures	Clay	(Australia) Carsten Ball	5–7, 1–6
Win	8–5	Sep 2009	Bogotá, Colombia	Challenger	Clay	(Italy) Riccardo Ghedin	6–1, 7–6^{(7–5)}
Win	9–5	Oct 2009	Quito, Ecuador	Challenger	Clay	(Argentina) Sebastián Decoud	7–6^{(7–4)}, 6–7^{(5–7)}, 6–4
Loss	9–6	Jul 2010	Bogotá, Colombia	Challenger	Clay	(Colombia) Robert Farah	3–6, 6–2, 6–7^{(3–7)},
Win	10–6	Oct 2010	Cali, Colombia	Challenger	Clay	(Brazil) Júlio Silva	7–5, 3–6, 6–3
Loss	10–7	Jul 2011	Bogotá, Colombia	Challenger	Clay	(Spain) Feliciano López	4–6, 3–6
Loss	10–8	Sep 2011	Colombia F5, Bogotá	Futures	Clay	(Colombia) Alejandro González	7–5, 4–6, 2–6
Win	11–8	Apr 2012	Pereira, Colombia	Challenger	Clay	(Spain) Rubén Ramírez Hidalgo	5–7, 6–2, 6–1
Win	12–8	Mar 2013	Colombia F1, Pereira	Futures	Clay	(Greece) Theodoros Angelinos	6–3, 6–4
Win	13–8	Mar 2013	Colombia F2, Bogotá	Futures	Clay	(Italy) Gianluigi Quinzi	7–6^{(7–3)}, 7–6^{(7–2)}
Win	14–8	May 2013	Guatemala F1, Guatemala City	Futures	Hard	(Colombia) Nicolás Barrientos	7–5, 6–2
Win	15–8	May 2013	El Salvador F1, Santa Tecla	Futures	Clay	(Colombia) Michael Quintero Aguilar	6–3, 6–3
Loss	15–9	Nov 2013	Colombia F7, Bogotá	Futures	Hard	(Colombia) Juan Carlos Spir	3–4 ret.
Win	16–9	May 2015	Colombia F2, Pereira	Futures	Clay	(Brazil) Thiago Lopes	6–3, 7–5

=== Doubles: 25 (14–11) ===
Legend ATP Challenger (4–6) ITF Futures (10–5)	Finals by surface Hard (1–3) Clay (13–8) Grass (0–0) Carpet (0–0)

Result	W–L	Date	Tournament	Tier	Surface	Partner	Opponents	Score
Win	1–0	Jun 2002	Colombia F2, Santa Fe de Bogotá	Futures	Clay	(Colombia) Alejandro Falla	(Brazil) Fernando Araujo (Brazil) Eduardo Bohrer	3–0 ret.
Loss	1–1	Aug 2002	Spain F11, Irun	Futures	Clay	(Colombia) Alejandro Falla	(Spain) Marc Fornell Mestres (Spain) F Ventura-Martell	6–7^{(3–7)}, 1–6
Loss	1–2	Sep 2002	Spain F14, Madrid	Futures	Hard	(Colombia) Alejandro Falla	(Spain) A-J Martin-Arroyo (Spain) Gabriel Trujillo Soler	4–6, 4–6
Loss	1–3	Jan 2003	El Salvador F2, La Libertad	Futures	Hard	(Colombia) Alejandro Falla	(Argentina) Juan Pablo Brzezicki (Brazil) Bruno Soares	6–4, 4–6, 6–7^{(3–7)}
Loss	1–4	May 2003	Colombia F1A, Cali	Futures	Clay	(Colombia) Alejandro Falla	(United States) Mirko Pehar (Colombia) Michael Quintero Aguilar	3–6, 4–6
Win	2–4	Oct 2003	Colombia F2, Bogotá	Futures	Clay	(Colombia) Alejandro Falla	(Argentina) Carlos Berlocq (Brazil) Ronaldo Carvalho	6–4, 5–7, 6–4
Win	3–4	May 2004	Colombia F1, Cali	Futures	Clay	(Colombia) Michael Quintero Aguilar	(Argentina) Diego Hartfield (Argentina) Damián Patriarca	7–5, 6–4
Win	4–4	Sep 2004	Bolivia F1, La Paz	Futures	Clay	(Colombia) Michael Quintero Aguilar	(Argentina) Guillermo Carry (Portugal) Leonardo Tavares	7–5, 6–4
Win	5–4	Jun 2006	Brazil F4, Piracicaba	Futures	Clay	(Colombia) Santiago Giraldo	(Brazil) Lucas Engel (Brazil) Marcelo Melo	6–2, 7–6^{(7–5)}
Loss	5–5	Jul 2006	Cuenca, Ecuador	Challenger	Clay	(Colombia) Santiago Giraldo	(Germany) Frank Moser (Germany) Alexander Satschko	6–3, 3–6, [6–10]
Loss	5–6	Jan 2007	Colombia F1, Manizales	Futures	Clay	(Colombia) Juan Sebastián Cabal	(Argentina) Diego Álvarez (Ecuador) Carlos Avellán	6–1, 3–6, 6–7^{(6–8)}
Win	6–6	Feb 2007	Colombia F2, Bucaramanga	Futures	Clay	(Colombia) Juan Sebastián Cabal	(Argentina) Sebastián Decoud (Argentina) Alejandro Fabbri	6–4, 6–4
Win	7–6	Feb 2008	Colombia F2, Bucaramanga	Futures	Clay	(Colombia) Michael Quintero Aguilar	(Argentina) Diego Álvarez (Argentina) Juan-Pablo Amado	6–3, 2–6, [10–8]
Win	8–6	Jul 2008	Bogotá, Colombia	Challenger	Clay	(Belgium) Xavier Malisse	(Colombia) Michael Quintero Aguilar (Colombia) Juan Sebastián Cabal	6–1, 6–4
Win	9–6	Nov 2008	El Salvador F2, La Libertad	Futures	Clay	(Colombia) Michael Quintero Aguilar	(Czech Republic) Jiří Krkoška (Canada) Vasek Pospisil	6–7^{(6–8)}, 6–4, [14–12]
Win	10–6	Feb 2009	Colombia F2, Cartagena	Futures	Hard	(Colombia) Juan Sebastián Cabal	(Brazil) Eric Gomes (Brazil) André Miele	6–3, 7–5
Loss	10–7	Oct 2010	Quito, Ecuador	Challenger	Clay	(Colombia) Alejandro González	(United States) Eric Nunez (Mexico) Daniel Garza	5–7, 4–6
Win	11–7	Apr 2011	Pereira, Colombia	Challenger	Clay	(Uruguay) Marcel Felder	(Colombia) Eduardo Struvay (Colombia) Alejandro Falla	7–6^{(7–5)}, 6–4
Loss	11–8	Mar 2012	Salinas, Ecuador	Challenger	Clay	(Uruguay) Ariel Behar	(Argentina) Martín Alund (Argentina) Horacio Zeballos	3–6, 3–6
Win	12–8	Oct 2012	Quito, Ecuador	Challenger	Clay	(Colombia) Juan Sebastián Cabal	(Brazil) João Souza (Brazil) Marcelo Demoliner	7–6^{(9–7)}, 7–6^{(7–4)}
Loss	12–9	Jul 2013	Manta, Ecuador	Challenger	Hard	(Colombia) Alejandro González	(El Salvador) Marcelo Arévalo (Peru) Sergio Galdós	3–6, 4–6
Loss	12–10	Sep 2013	Cali, Colombia	Challenger	Clay	(Brazil) João Souza	(Argentina) Guido Andreozzi (Argentina) Eduardo Schwank	2–6, 4–6
Loss	12–11	Sep 2013	Quito, Ecuador	Challenger	Clay	(Guatemala) Christopher Díaz Figueroa	(United States) Kevin King (Colombia) Juan Carlos Spir	5–7, 7–6^{(11–9)}, [11–13]
Win	13–11	Oct 2013	São José do Rio Preto, Brazil	Challenger	Clay	(Colombia) Nicolás Barrientos	(Brazil) João Souza (Brazil) Marcelo Demoliner	6–4, 6–4
Win	14–11	Nov 2016	Colombia F7, Pereira	Futures	Clay	(Colombia) Alejandro Gomez	(Italy) Davide Pontoglio (Italy) Giorgio Portaluri	6–4, 5–7, [10–7]
