= Alejandro Falla =

Colombian tennis player

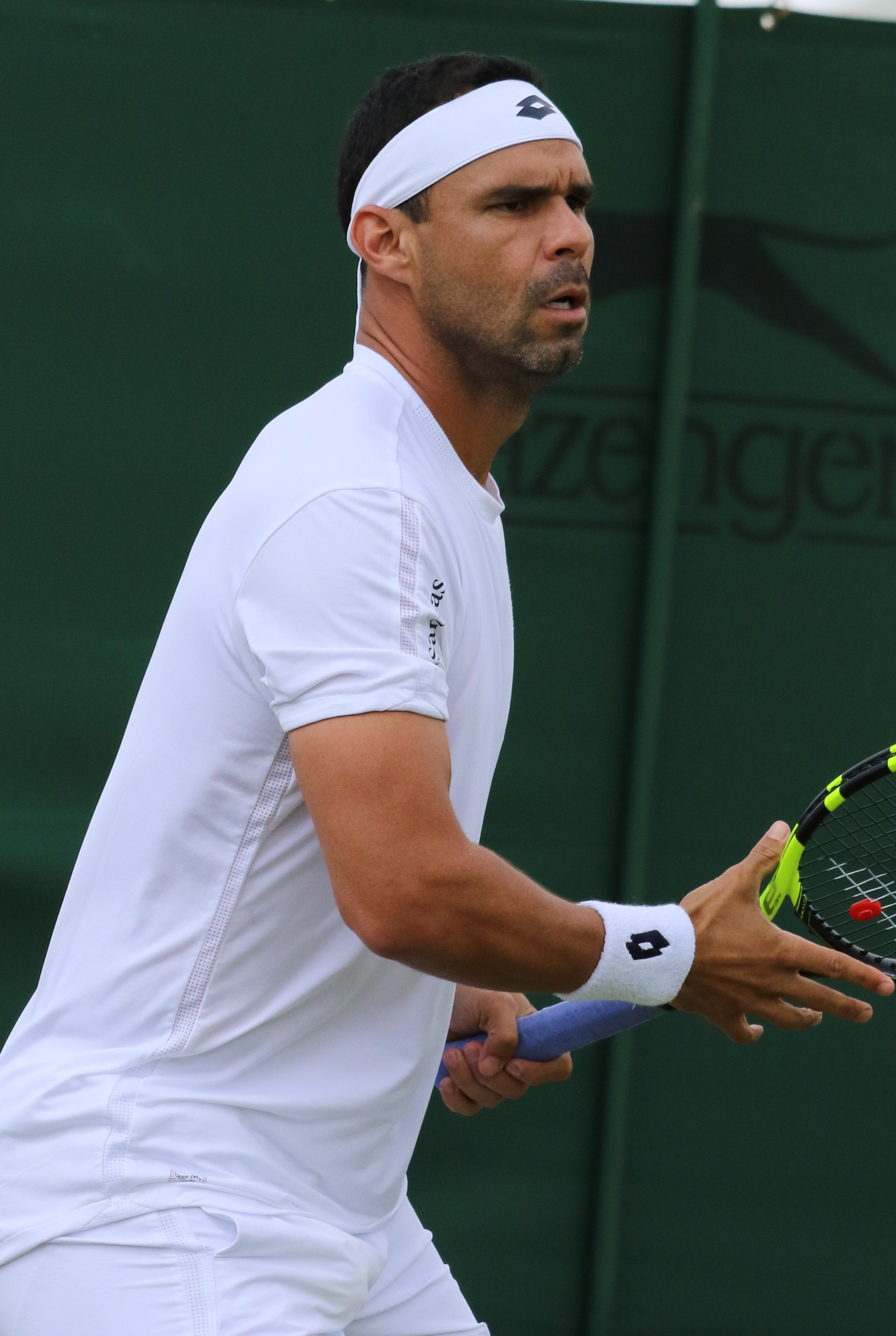
- Full name: Alejandro Falla Ramírez
- Country (sports): Colombia
- Born: 14 November 1983 (age 42) Popayán, Colombia
- Height: 1.85 m (6 ft 1 in)
- Turned pro: 2000
- Retired: 2018
- Plays: Left-handed (two-handed backhand)
- Prize money: $3,101,331

Singles
- Career record: 114–169 (at ATP Tour level, Grand Slam level, and in Davis Cup)
- Career titles: 0
- Highest ranking: No. 48 (16 July 2012)

Grand Slam singles results
- Australian Open: 3R (2010, 2012)
- French Open: 4R (2011)
- Wimbledon: 3R (2012)
- US Open: 2R (2006, 2011)

Doubles
- Career record: 17–41 (at ATP Tour level, Grand Slam level, and in Davis Cup)
- Career titles: 0
- Highest ranking: No. 130 (3 August 2009)

Grand Slam doubles results
- Australian Open: 1R (2010, 2012, 2013)
- French Open: 2R (2014)
- Wimbledon: 1R (2010, 2014)
- US Open: 1R (2010, 2014)
Medal record
Central American and Caribbean Games
Silver medal – second place	2002 San Salvador	Men's doubles
Bronze medal – third place	2002 San Salvador	Men's Team
- Last updated on: 9 April 2021.

Alejandro Falla Ramírez (Spanish pronunciation: [aleˈxandɾo ˈfaʎa raˈmiɾes]; born 14 November 1983) is a Colombian former professional tennis player. The left-hander turned professional in 2000 and achieved a career-high singles ranking of world No. 48 in July 2012. At the 2006 Wimbledon tournament, Falla upset ninth seed Nikolay Davydenko and at the 2007 Sony Ericsson Open he beat ninth seed Tommy Haas in straight sets. He reached the semifinals of the Grand Prix de Tennis de Lyon in 2007, beating players such as the fifth seed Ivan Ljubičić.

== Career ==
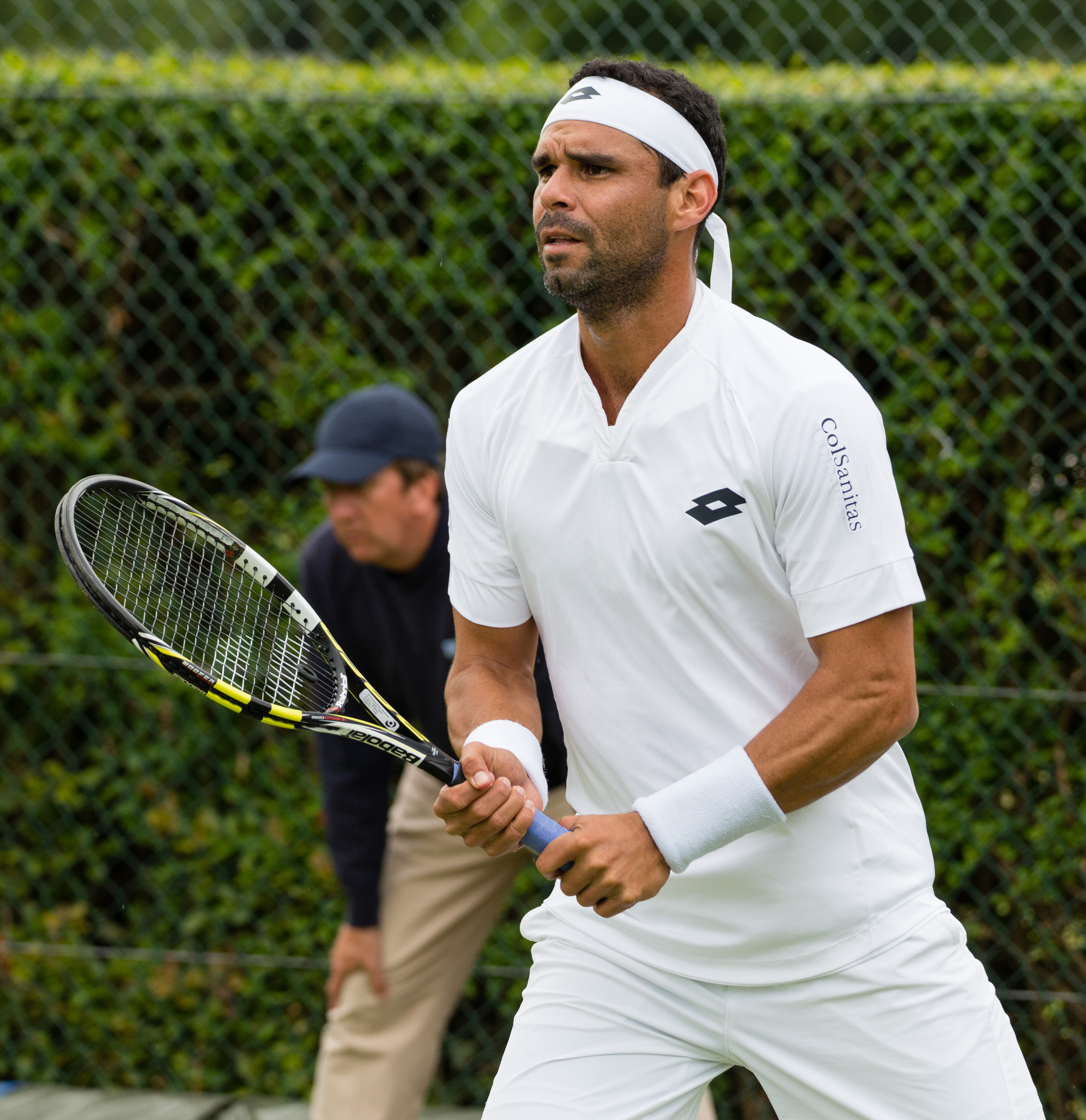
Alejandro Falla, 2015 Wimbledon Qualifying

The Colombian became the first player from his country to break into the top 100 of the ATP rankings since Mauricio Hadad in 1996. In 2006, Alejandro qualified a career-high five times into the main draw of ATP tournaments. In his second tournament of the year, he reached the final of the Mexico City Challenger. He then went on to earn points for his country in a Davis Cup tie against Paraguay Davis Team. Then later in April, he won the Bogotá Challenger. At Roland Garros, he reached the second round after defeating Justin Gimelstob, though he lost to Roger Federer in the second round. A few weeks later at Wimbledon, he managed to beat Nikolay Davydenko in a four-set thriller. His victory over Davydenko was his first win over a top-10 player, and a first ever for a Colombian player. However, he was then defeated in the second round by Philipp Kohlschreiber in another four-set match. He then reached the second round in the US Open. In the first round, he beat Juan Martín del Potro in four sets, before being defeated by Dmitry Tursunov in straight sets.

Falla almost caused a sensation in the first round of Wimbledon in 2010, winning the first two sets against defending champion Roger Federer and serving for the match at 5–4 in the fourth set (he was three points away from winning), before Federer eventually won 5–7, 4–6, 6–4, 7–6, 6–0.

His best result in a Grand Slam was in 2011 at the French Open. Falla reached the fourth round, where he lost to the unseeded Juan Ignacio Chela.

In the 2014 Gerry Weber Open in Halle, Falla rallied to beat 2011 champion Philipp Kohlschreiber 5–7, 7–6 (5), 6–4 to become the first Colombian to reach the final of a grass-court tournament. He lost to six-time champion Roger Federer in the final.

== Juniors ==
Alejandro Falla made it to the semi-finals in the 2001 French Open, giving a big inspiration to Colombian players aspiring to achieve strong results in junior open tennis.

=== Doubles ===
In junior doubles at the French Open, he and compatriot Carlos Salamanca defeated the German duo Markus Bayer and Philipp Petzschner, the first junior title won by Colombians in a Grand Slam.

Tournament	2000	2001
Junior Grand Slam tournaments
Australian Open	A	A
French Open	1R	W
Wimbledon	1R	1R
US Open	A	2R

=== Doubles: 1 (1 title) ===
Result	Year	Tournament	Surface	Partner	Opponents	Score
Win	2001	French Open	Clay	(Colombia) Carlos Salamanca	(Germany) Markus Bayer (Germany) Philipp Petzschner	3–6, 7–5, 6–4

== ATP career finals ==
=== Singles: 2 (2 runner-ups) ===
Legend Grand Slam tournaments (0–0) ATP World Tour Finals (0–0) ATP World Tour Masters 1000 (0–0) ATP World Tour 500 Series (0–0) ATP World Tour 250 Series (0–2)	Titles by surface Hard (0–1) Clay (0–0) Grass (0–1)	Titles by setting Outdoor (0–2) Indoor (0–0)

Result	W–L	Date	Tournament	Tier	Surface	Opponent	Score
Loss	0–1	Jul 2013	Colombia Open, Colombia	250 Series	Hard	(Croatia) Ivo Karlović	3–6, 6–7^{(4–7)}
Loss	0–2	Jun 2014	Halle Open, Germany	250 Series	Grass	(Switzerland) Roger Federer	6–7^{(2–7)}, 6–7^{(3–7)}

=== Doubles: 1 (1 runner-up) ===
Legend Grand Slam tournaments (0–0) ATP World Tour Finals (0–0) ATP World Tour Masters 1000 (0–0) ATP World Tour 500 Series (0–0) ATP World Tour 250 Series (0–1)	Titles by surface Hard (0–1) Clay (0–0) Grass (0–0)	Titles by setting Outdoor (0–1) Indoor (0–0)

Result	W–L	Date	Tournament	Tier	Surface	Partner	Opponents	Score
Loss	0–1	Feb 2011	Pacific Coast Championships, United States	250 Series	Hard	(Belgium) Xavier Malisse	(United States) Scott Lipsky (United States) Rajeev Ram	4–6, 6–4, [8–10]

== ATP Challenger and ITF Futures finals ==
=== Singles: 24 (14–10) ===
Legend ATP Challenger (11–8) ITF Futures (3–2)	Finals by surface Hard (3–4) Clay (11–6) Grass (0–0) Carpet (0–0)

Result	W–L	Date	Tournament	Tier	Surface	Opponent	Score
Loss	0–1	Jun 2002	Bogotá, Colombia	Futures	Clay	(Colombia) Pablo González	6–7^{(6–8)}, 6–7^{(2–7)}
Loss	0–2	Jun 2002	Bogotá, Colombia	Futures	Clay	(Brazil) Eduardo Bohrer	6–7^{(3–7)}, 6–7^{(1–7)}
Win	1–2	Jan 2003	San Salvador, El Salvador	Futures	Clay	(Chile) Jorge Aguilar	6–4, 6–4
Win	2–2	May 2003	Pereira, Colombia	Futures	Clay	(Brazil) Thiago Alves	7–5, 6–3
Win	3–2	Oct 2003	Bogotá, Colombia	Futures	Clay	(Austria) Marco Mirnegg	7–5, 6–3
Loss	3–3	Feb 2004	Waikoloa, United States	Challenger	Clay	(Russia) Dmitry Tursunov	5–7, 6–7^{(4–7)}
Win	4–3	Mar 2004	Bogotá, Colombia	Challenger	Clay	(Chile) Adrián García	4–6, 6–1, 6–2
Win	5–3	Mar 2004	Salinas, Ecuador	Challenger	Hard	(Luxembourg) Gilles Müller	6–7, 6–2, 6–2
Loss	5–4	Jul 2005	Pozoblanco, Spain	Challenger	Hard	(Cyprus) Marcos Baghdatis	3–6, 3–6
Loss	5–5	Jul 2005	Binghamton, United States	Challenger	Hard	(United Kingdom) Andy Murray	6–7^{(3–7)}, 3–6
Loss	5–6	Apr 2006	Mexico City, Mexico	Challenger	Clay	(Paraguay) Ramón Delgado	3–6, 6–4, 4–6
Win	6–6	Apr 2006	Bogotá, Colombia (2)	Challenger	Clay	(Brazil) André Sá	6–4, 6–2
Loss	6–7	Nov 2007	Bratislava, Slovakia	Challenger	Hard	(Italy) Simone Bolelli	6–4, 6–7^{(7–9)}, 1–6
Win	7–7	May 2009	Pereira, Colombia	Challenger	Clay	(Argentina) Horacio Zeballos	6–4, 4–6, 6–2
Win	8–7	Sep 2009	Cali, Colombia	Challenger	Clay	(Argentina) Horacio Zeballos	6–3, 6–4
Win	9–7	Oct 2009	Rennes, France	Challenger	Hard	(France) Thierry Ascione	6–3, 6–2
Loss	9–8	Apr 2010	Bogotá, Colombia	Challenger	Clay	(Brazil) João Souza	6–4, 4–6, 1–6
Win	10–8	Sep 2011	Cali, Colombia (2)	Challenger	Clay	(Argentina) Eduardo Schwank	6–4, 6–3
Loss	10–9	Oct 2011	Medellín, Colombia	Challenger	Clay	(Dominican Republic) Víctor Estrella Burgos	7–6^{(7–2)}, 4–6, 4–6
Win	11–9	Apr 2012	Barranquilla, Colombia	Challenger	Clay	(Argentina) Horacio Zeballos	6–4, 6–1
Win	12–9	Jul 2012	Bogotá, Colombia	Challenger	Clay	(Colombia) Santiago Giraldo	7–5, 6–3
Win	13–9	Jan 2014	Nouméa, New Caledonia	Challenger	Hard	(Canada) Steven Diez	6–2, 6–2
Win	14–9	Jan 2014	Bucaramanga, Colombia	Challenger	Clay	(Italy) Paolo Lorenzi	7–5, 6–1
Loss	14–10	Jan 2016	Nouméa, New Caledonia	Challenger	Hard	(France) Adrian Mannarino	7–5, 2–6, 2–6

=== Doubles: 20 (10–10) ===
Legend ATP Challenger (6–5) ITF Futures (4–5)	Finals by surface Hard (1–3) Clay (9–6) Grass (0–1) Carpet (0–0)

Result	W–L	Date	Tournament	Tier	Surface	Partner	Opponents	Score
Loss	0–1	Oct 2000	Colombia F2, Bogotá	Futures	Clay	(Colombia) Pablo Gonzalez	(Italy) Leonardo Azzaro (Israel) Eyal Ran	2–6, 2–6
Win	1–1	Aug 2001	Spain F4, Denia	Futures	Clay	(Colombia) Pablo Gonzalez	(Spain) J. Fernandez-Rubio (Spain) A-J Martin-Arroyo	2–6, 6–2, 6–2
Win	2–1	Jun 2002	Colombia F2, Bogotá	Futures	Clay	(Colombia) Carlos Salamanca	(Brazil) Eduardo Bohrer (Brazil) Fernando Araujo	3–0 ret.
Loss	2–2	Aug 2002	Spain F11, Irun	Futures	Clay	(Colombia) Carlos Salamanca	(Spain) Marc Fornell Mestres (Spain) F. Ventura-Martell	6–7^{(3–7)}, 1–6
Loss	2–3	Sep 2002	Spain F14, Madrid	Futures	Hard	(Colombia) Carlos Salamanca	(Spain) Gabriel Trujillo Soler (Spain) A-J Martin-Arroyo	4–6, 4–6
Loss	2–4	Jan 2003	El Salvador F2, La Libertad	Futures	Hard	(Colombia) Carlos Salamanca	(Argentina) Juan Pablo Brzezicki (Brazil) Bruno Soares	6–4, 4–6, 6–7^{(3–7)}
Win	3–4	May 2003	Mexico F4, Aguascalientes	Futures	Hard	(Brazil) Bruno Soares	(Brazil) Ronaldo Carvalho (Brazil) Gabriel Pitta	4–6, 6–4, 6–3
Loss	3–5	May 2003	Colombia F1A, Cali	Futures	Clay	(Colombia) Carlos Salamanca	(United States) Mirko Pehar (Colombia) Michael Quintero	3–6, 4–6
Win	4–5	Oct 2003	Colombia F2, Bogotá	Futures	Clay	(Colombia) Carlos Salamanca	(Brazil) Ronaldo Carvalho (Argentina) Carlos Berlocq	6–5, 5–7, 6–4
Loss	4–6	Jun 2004	Surbiton, Great Britain	Challenger	Grass	(United States) Glenn Weiner	(Australia) Nathan Healey (United States) Jim Thomas	3–6, 6–7^{(9–11)}
Win	5–6	Sep 2008	Cali, Colombia	Challenger	Clay	(Colombia) Juan Sebastián Cabal	(Argentina) Brian Dabul (Argentina) Horacio Zeballos	7–6^{(8–6)}, 6–3
Win	6–6	Sep 2008	Bogotá 3, Colombia	Challenger	Clay	(Colombia) Juan Sebastián Cabal	(Argentina) Alejandro Fabbri (Argentina) Horacio Zeballos	3–6, 7–6^{(9–7)}, [10–8]
Win	7–6	Nov 2008	Medellín, Colombia	Challenger	Clay	(Colombia) Juan Sebastián Cabal	(Argentina) Juan-Pablo Amado (Dominican Republic) Víctor Estrella Burgos	3–4 ret.
Loss	7–7	May 2009	Pereira, Colombia	Challenger	Clay	(Colombia) Juan Sebastián Cabal	(Brazil) João Souza (Dominican Republic) Víctor Estrella Burgos	4–6, 4–6
Win	8–7	Nov 2009	Bogotá, Colombia	Challenger	Clay	(Colombia) Alejandro González	(Argentina) Diego Álvarez (Argentina) Sebastián Decoud	5–7, 6–4, [10–8]
Loss	8–8	Oct 2009	Mons, Belgium	Challenger	Hard	(Russia) Teymuraz Gabashvili	(Uzbekistan) Denis Istomin (Russia) Evgeny Korolev	7–6^{(7–4)}, 6–7^{(4–7)}, [9–11]
Loss	8–9	Apr 2011	Barranquilla, Colombia	Challenger	Clay	(Colombia) Eduardo Struvay	(Italy) Flavio Cipolla (Italy) Paolo Lorenzi	3–6, 4–6
Loss	8–10	Apr 2011	Pereira, Colombia	Challenger	Clay	(Colombia) Eduardo Struvay	(Uruguay) Marcel Felder (Colombia) Carlos Salamanca	6–7^{(5–7)}, 4–6
Win	9–10	Sep 2016	Barranquilla, Colombia	Challenger	Clay	(Colombia) Eduardo Struvay	(Ecuador) Gonzalo Escobar (Colombia) Roberto Quiroz	6–4, 7–5
Win	10–10	Oct 2016	Medellín, Colombia	Challenger	Clay	(Colombia) Eduardo Struvay	(Brazil) André Ghem (Spain) Juan Lizariturry	6–3, 6–2

== Performance timelines ==
Key
W	F	SF	QF	#R	RR	Q#	P#	DNQ	A	Z#	PO	G	S	B	NMS	NTI	P	NH

(W) winner; (F) finalist; (SF) semifinalist; (QF) quarterfinalist; (#R) rounds 4, 3, 2, 1; (RR) round-robin stage; (Q#) qualification round; (P#) preliminary round; (DNQ) did not qualify; (A) absent; (Z#) Davis/Fed Cup Zonal Group (with number indication) or (PO) play-off; (G) gold, (S) silver or (B) bronze Olympic/Paralympic medal; (NMS) not a Masters tournament; (NTI) not a Tier I tournament; (P) postponed; (NH) not held; (SR) strike rate (events won / competed); (W–L) win–loss record.

=== Singles ===
Tournament	2001	2002	2003	2004	2005	2006	2007	2008	2009	2010	2011	2012	2013	2014	2015	2016	2017	SR	W–L
Grand Slam tournaments
Australian Open	A	A	A	Q1	A	A	Q2	2R	A	3R	1R	3R	2R	2R	1R	Q2	A	0 / 7	7–7
French Open	A	A	A	2R	Q1	2R	1R	2R	Q1	2R	4R	1R	1R	1R	1R	Q1	A	0 / 10	7–10
Wimbledon	A	A	A	2R	Q3	2R	2R	1R	1R	1R	1R	3R	1R	1R	1R	Q2	A	0 / 11	5–11
US Open	A	A	A	Q2	Q1	2R	Q2	Q1	1R	1R	2R	1R	A	1R	Q3	A	A	0 / 6	2–6
Win–loss	0–0	0–0	0–0	2–2	0–0	3–3	1–2	2–3	0–2	3–4	4–4	4–4	1–3	1–4	0–3	0–0	0–0	0 / 34	21–34
ATP World Tour Masters 1000
Indian Wells Masters	A	A	A	A	A	A	2R	A	A	1R	A	1R	1R	3R	Q1	A	A	0 / 5	3–5
Miami Masters	A	A	A	A	A	A	3R	A	A	2R	Q1	2R	3R	1R	3R	Q1	A	0 / 6	8–6
Monte Carlo Masters	A	A	A	A	A	A	A	A	A	A	A	A	A	A	A	A	A	0 / 0	0–0
Rome Masters	A	A	A	A	A	A	A	A	A	A	A	Q1	A	1R	Q1	A	A	0 / 1	0–1
Madrid Masters	NH	A	A	A	A	1R	1R	A	A	A	1R	2R	Q1	Q1	1R	A	A	0 / 5	1–5
Canada Masters	A	A	A	A	A	1R	1R	A	2R	1R	1R	A	A	1R	Q2	Q1	A	0 / 6	1–6
Cincinnati Masters	A	A	A	A	A	A	1R	A	A	2R	Q1	1R	A	1R	A	A	A	0 / 4	1–4
Shanghai Masters	Not Masters Series								A	A	A	1R	1R	A	A	A	A	0 / 2	0–2
Paris Masters	A	A	A	A	A	A	A	A	1R	A	A	2R	Q1	A	A	A	A	0 / 2	1–2
Win–loss	0–0	0–0	0–0	0–0	0–0	0–2	3–5	0–0	1–2	2–4	0–2	3–6	2–3	2–5	2–2	0–0	0–0	0 / 31	15–31
National representation
Olympics	Not Held			A	Not Held			A	Not Held			1R	Not Held			A	NH	0 / 1	0–1
Davis Cup	Z2	Z2	A	Z3	Z2	Z2	Z1	Z1	Z1	PO	Z1	Z1	PO	Z1	PO	A	PO	0 / 0	22–10
Win–loss	1–0	1–0	0–0	5–0	2–0	4–0	2–1	2–0	1–1	0–1	1–2	0–2	2–2	1–0	0–2	0–0	0–0	0 / 1	22–11
Career statistics
Titles / Finals	0 / 0	0 / 0	0 / 0	0 / 0	0 / 0	0 / 0	0 / 0	0 / 0	0 / 0	0 / 0	0 / 0	0 / 0	0 / 1	0 / 1	0 / 0	0 / 0	0 / 0	0 / 2	
Year-end ranking	1383	566	275	127	231	108	81	180	81	105	74	54	99	88	122	273	397		

=== Doubles ===
Tournament	2010	2011	2012	2013	2014	W–L
Grand Slam tournaments
Australian Open	1R	A	1R	1R	A	0–3
French Open	1R	A	1R	A	2R	1–3
Wimbledon	1R	A	A	A	1R	0–2
US Open	1R	A	A	A	1R	0–2
Win–loss	0–4	0–0	0–2	0–1	1-3	1–10
