= Eduardo Struvay =

Colombian tennis player (born 1990)

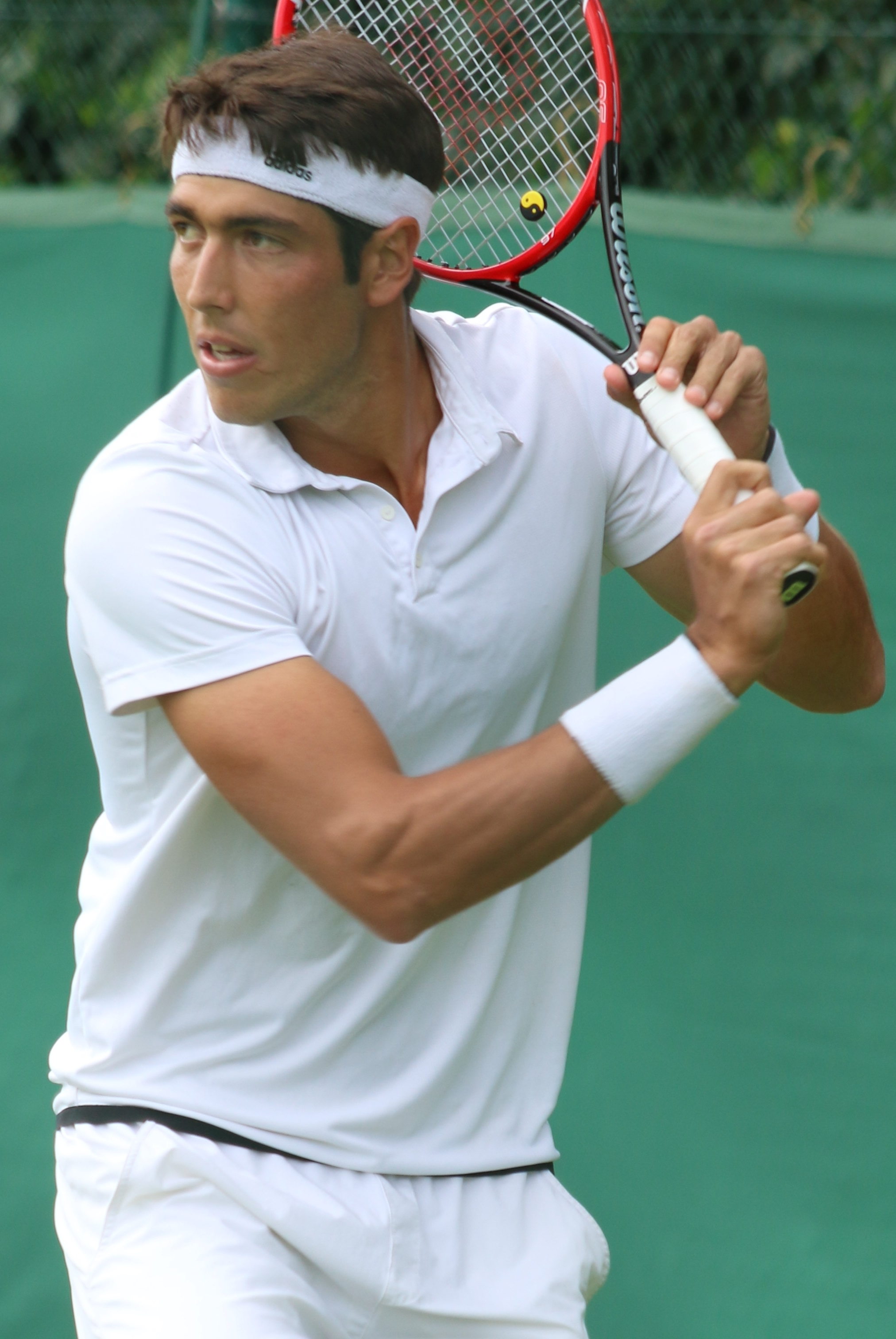
- Full name: Eduardo Struvay Jaramillo
- Country (sports): Colombia
- Born: 17 December 1990 (age 34); Pereira, Colombia
- Turned pro: 2007
- Retired: 2020
- Plays: Right-handed (two-handed forehand)
- Prize money: US$232,735

Singles
- Career record: 0–3
- Career titles: 0
- Highest ranking: No. 158 (13 June 2016)

Grand Slam singles results
- Australian Open: Q1 (2016)
- French Open: Q1 (2016)
- Wimbledon: Q1 (2016)

Doubles
- Career record: 3–2
- Career titles: 0
- Highest ranking: No. 147 (27 April 2015)
Medal record
Representing Colombia
Men's Tennis
Central American and Caribbean Games
Gold medal – first place	2014 Veracruz	Men's Doubles
Gold medal – first place	2014 Veracruz	Team
Gold medal – first place	2018 Barranquilla	Mixed Doubles
Bronze medal – third place	2018 Barranquilla	Men's Doubles
Bronze medal – third place	2018 Barranquilla	Team
South American Games
Bronze medal – third place	2018 Cochabamba	Men's Doubles
- Last updated on: 4 August 2018.

Eduardo Struvay Jaramillo (Spanish pronunciation: [eˈðwaɾðo estɾuˈβaj]; born 17 December 1990) is a former Colombian professional tennis player. He competes mainly on the ATP Challenger Tour and ITF Futures, both in singles and doubles. He reached his highest ATP singles ranking of world No. 231 on 13 February 2013, and his highest ATP doubles ranking of No. 177 on 3 February 2014.

== Central American and Caribbean Games ==
=== Doubles: 1 ===
Outcome	No.	Year	Tournament	Surface	Partner	Opponent	Score
Winner	1.	2014	Veracruz, Mexico	Clay	(Colombia) Juan Carlos Spir	(Mexico) Santiago González (Mexico) César Ramírez	7–5, 6–3

=== Mixed Doubles: 1 ===
Outcome	No.	Year	Tournament	Surface	Partner	Opponent	Score
Winner	1.	2018	Barranquilla, Colombia	Hard	(Colombia) María Paulina Pérez	(Dominican Republic) José Olivares (Dominican Republic) Kelly Williford	7–6^{(7–5)}, 6–2

== ATP Challenger & ITF Futures finals ==
=== Singles: 17 (11–6) ===
Legend
ATP Challenger Tour (2–0)
ITF Futures (9–6)

Outcome	No.	Date	Tournament	Surface	Opponent	Score
Loss	1.	October 10, 2009	Barquisimeto, Venezuela F7	Clay	(Venezuela) José de Armas	4–6, 7–5, 1–6
Loss	2.	October 24, 2009	Caracas, Venezuela F9	Hard	(Venezuela) David Souto	2–6, 2–6
Loss	3.	May 21, 2011	Aosta, Italy F10	Clay	(Italy) Alessandro Giannessi	4–6, 6–7^{(7–9)}
Win	1.	June 18, 2011	Maracaibo, Venezuela F4	Hard	(Australia) John Peers	6–4, 3–6, 7–6^{(12–10)}
Win	2.	August 21, 2011	Bogotá, Colombia F3	Clay	(Chile) Guillermo Rivera Aránguiz	6–4, 7–6^{(9–7)}
Win	3.	August 27, 2011	Medellín, Colombia F4	Clay	(Colombia) Alejandro González	6–4, 6–2
Loss	4.	October 8, 2011	Caracas, Venezuela F8	Hard	(Canada) Peter Polansky	1–6, 3–6
Win	4.	August 18, 2013	Bogotá, Colombia F4	Clay	(Argentina) Patricio Heras	6–3, 6–7^{(7–9)}, 6–3
Loss	5.	May 18, 2014	Morelia, Mexico F4	Hard	(Mexico) Miguel Ángel Reyes-Varela	3–6, 3–6
Win	5.	June 28, 2014	Palma del Río, Spain F15	Hard	(Belarus) Egor Gerasimov	6–4, 7–6^{(7–4)}
Win	6.	November 15, 2014	Manizales, Colombia F7	Clay	(Colombia) Nicolás Barrientos	6–4, 6–7^{(3–7)}, 6–4
Win	7.	November 22, 2014	Popayán, Colombia F8	Hard	(Bolivia) Federico Zeballos	6–4, 7–5
Win	8.	July 4, 2015	Popayán, Colombia F4	Hard	(Colombia) Daniel Elahi Galán	3–6, 7–6^{(7–5)}, 7–6^{(7–2)}
Win	9.	August 1, 2015	Medellín, Colombia F6	Clay	(Brazil) José Pereira	6–2, 7–5
Win	1.	November 8, 2015	Bogotá, Colombia	Clay	(Italy) Paolo Lorenzi	6–3, 4–6, 6–4
Win	2.	March 13, 2016	Puebla, Mexico	Hard	(Serbia) Peđa Krstin	4–6, 6–4, 6–4
Loss	6.	May 29, 2016	Santa Margarida de Montbui, Spain F15	Hard	(Spain) Ricardo Ojeda Lara	1–6, 7–6^{(7–5)}, 4–6

=== Doubles: 16 (6–10) ===
Legend
ATP Challenger Tour (3–5)
ITF Futures (3–5)

Outcome	No.	Date	Tournament	Surface	Partner	Opponent	Score
Loss	1.	27 May 2012	F3 Futures Valencia	Hard	(Colombia) Felipe Escobar	(Venezuela) Piero Luisi (Venezuela) Román Recarte	2–6, 3–6
Win	1.	25 March 2013	Pereira, Colombia (1)	Clay	(Colombia) Nicolás Barrientos	(Argentina) Facundo Bagnis (Argentina) Federico Delbonis	3–6, 6–3,[10–7]
Loss	2.	22 July 2013	Medellín, Colombia	Clay	(Colombia) Nicolás Barrientos	(Ecuador) Emilio Gómez (Moldova) Roman Borvanov	3–6, 6–7 ^{(4–7)}
Loss	2.	11 August 2013	F3 Futures Medellín	Clay	(Colombia) Felipe Mantilla	(Peru) Mauricio Echazú (Argentina) Patricio Heras	6–3, 1–6, [12–14]
Loss	3.	18 August 2013	F4 Futures Bogotá	Clay	(Colombia) Felipe Mantilla	(Colombia) Juan Carlos Spir (United States) Kevin King	3–6, 3–6
Loss	3.	10 November 2013	Bogotá, Colombia (1)	Clay	(Colombia) Nicolás Barrientos	(Colombia) Juan Sebastián Cabal (Colombia) Alejandro González	3–6, 2–6
Win	4.	24 November 2013	F7 Futures Bogotá	Hard	(Colombia) Felipe Mantilla	(Colombia) Juan Carlos Spir (South Africa) Dean O'Brien	7–6 ^{(7–5)}, 2–6, [10–7]
Loss	5.	20 April 2014	F1 Futures Pereira	Clay	(Colombia) Felipe Mantilla	(Peru) Duilio Vallebuona (Bolivia) Federico Zeballos	3–6, 6–7 ^{(5–7)}
Loss	6.	26 April 2014	F2 Futures Pereira	Clay	(Colombia) Nicolás Barrientos	(Puerto Rico) Alex Llompart (Argentina) Mateo Nicolás Martínez	6–3, 3–6, [6–10]
Loss	4.	3 May 2014	Cali, Colombia	Clay	(Colombia) Nicolás Barrientos	(Argentina) Facundo Bagnis (Argentina) Eduardo Schwank	3–6, 3–6
Win	5.	27 September 2014	Pereira, Colombia (2)	Clay (red)	(Colombia) Nicolás Barrientos	(Argentina) Guido Pella (Argentina) Horacio Zeballos	3–6, 6–3, [11–9]
Win	7.	16 November 2014	F7 Futures Manizales	Clay	(Colombia) Nicolás Barrientos	(Argentina) Mateo Nicolás Martínez (Argentina) Facundo Mena	7–5, 2–6, [10–5]
Win	8.	22 November 2014	F8 Futures Popayán, Colombia	Hard	(Colombia) Nicolás Barrientos	(Colombia) Felipe Mantilla (Bolivia) Federico Zeballos	6–1, 3–6, [10–3]
Loss	6.	31 January 2015	Bucaramanga, Colombia	Clay (red)	(Colombia) Nicolás Barrientos	(Argentina) Guillermo Durán (Argentina) Andrés Molteni	5–7, 7–6^{(10–8)}, [0–10]
Win	7.	11 October 2015	Medellín, Colombia	Clay (red)	(Colombia) Nicolás Barrientos	(Colombia) Alejandro Gómez (Colombia) Felipe Mantilla	7–6^{(8–6)}, 6–7^{(5–7)}, [10–4]
Loss	8.	8 November 2015	Bogotá, Colombia (2)	Clay	(Colombia) Nicolás Barrientos	(Chile) Julio Peralta (Argentina) Horacio Zeballos	3–6, 4–6
