= 2013 Seguros Bolívar Open Medellín – Singles =

Singles
- 2013 Seguros Bolívar Open Medellín

Final
- Champion: (Colombia) Alejandro González
- Runner-up: (Argentina) Guido Andreozzi
- Score: 6–4, 6–4

Events
Singles	Doubles
← 2012 ·	Seguros Bolívar Open Medellín	· 2014 →

Paolo Lorenzi was the defending champion, but chose to compete at the 2013 ATP Vegeta Croatia Open Umag instead.

Alejandro González won the title, defeating Guido Andreozzi in the final, 6–4, 6–4.

== Seeds ==
1. (Colombia) Alejandro González (champion)
2. (Argentina) Guido Andreozzi (final)
3. (Argentina) Facundo Argüello (quarterfinals)
4. (Brazil) Fabiano de Paula (first round)
5. (Argentina) Agustín Velotti (second round)
6. (Ecuador) Julio César Campozano (second round)
7. (Colombia) Nicolás Barrientos (quarterfinals)
8. (Colombia) Carlos Salamanca (semifinals)

== Draw ==
=== Key ===
- Q = Qualifier
- WC = Wild card
- LL = Lucky loser
- Alt = Alternate
- SE = Special exempt
- PR = Protected ranking
- ITF = ITF entry
- JE = Junior exempt
- w/o = Walkover
- r = Retired
- d = Defaulted
- SR = Special ranking

=== Finals ===
Semifinals
1	(Colombia) Alejandro González	6^{7}	7^{7}	6
(Dominican Republic) Víctor Estrella	7^{7}	6^{5}	3
8	(Colombia) Carlos Salamanca	2	2
2	(Argentina) Guido Andreozzi	6	6

Final
1	(Colombia) Alejandro González	6	6
2	(Argentina) Guido Andreozzi	4	4

=== Top half ===
First round
1	(Colombia) A González	6	7^{7}
(Ecuador) Emilio Gómez	4	6^{3}
WC	(United States) Alvaro Ochoa	1	6	3
(Ecuador) I Endara	6	3	6
(Peru) M Echazú	4	4
Q	(Ecuador) R Quiroz	6	6
(Brazil) A Miele	7	2	1
6	(Ecuador) JC Campozano	5	6	6
4	(Brazil) F de Paula	6^{11}	6	3
(Argentina) E Schwank	7^{13}	2	6
WC	(Ecuador) G Lapentti	3	4
(Colombia) M Quintero	6	6
Q	(Colombia) DE Galán	4	3
(Dominican Republic) V Estrella	6	6
(Peru) S Galdós	3	4
5	(Argentina) A Velotti	6	6

Second round
1	(Colombia) A González	6	6
(Ecuador) I Endara	3	3
Q	(Ecuador) R Quiroz	6	7
6	(Ecuador) JC Campozano	1	5
(Argentina) E Schwank	7^{7}	4	6
(Colombia) M Quintero	6^{3}	6	3
(Dominican Republic) V Estrella	6^{4}	6	7^{8}
5	(Argentina) A Velotti	7^{7}	1	6^{6}

Quarterfinals
1	(Colombia) A González	7^{7}	6
Q	(Ecuador) R Quiroz	6^{3}	4
(Argentina) E Schwank	1	3
(Dominican Republic) V Estrella	6	6

Semifinals
1	(Colombia) A González	6^{7}	7^{7}	6
(Dominican Republic) V Estrella	7^{7}	6^{5}	3

=== Bottom half ===
First round
8	(Colombia) C Salamanca	6	6
Q	(Colombia) Felipe Escobar	4	1
(Moldova) R Borvanov	7	7
(Peru) D Beretta	5	5
(Brazil) T Turini	6	6
(El Salvador) M Arévalo	3	3
WC	(Colombia) E Struvay	1	2
3	(Argentina) F Argüello	6	6
7	(Colombia) N Barrientos	6	6
Q	(Colombia) Steffen Zornosa	2	4
WC	(Colombia) Felipe Mantilla	1	4
(Brazil) F Neis	6	6
(Dominican Republic) J Hernández	3	2
(Argentina) JI Londero	6	6
(Brazil) J Pereira	2	6	1
2	(Argentina) G Andreozzi	6	3	6

Second round
8	(Colombia) C Salamanca	6	7^{7}
(Moldova) R Borvanov	1	6^{5}
(Brazil) T Turini	3	4
3	(Argentina) F Argüello	6	6
7	(Colombia) N Barrientos	7	6^{2}	6
(Brazil) F Neis	5	7^{7}	2
(Argentina) JI Londero	3	2
2	(Argentina) G Andreozzi	6	6

Quarterfinals
8	(Colombia) C Salamanca	6	6
3	(Argentina) F Argüello	4	3
7	(Colombia) N Barrientos	3	1
2	(Argentina) G Andreozzi	6	6

Semifinals
8	(Colombia) C Salamanca	2	2
2	(Argentina) G Andreozzi	6	6
