= 2014 Seguros Bolívar Open Medellín – Men's singles =

Men's singles
- 2014 Seguros Bolívar Open Medellín

Final
- Champion: (United States) Austin Krajicek
- Runner-up: (Brazil) João Souza
- Score: 7–5, 6–3

Events
Singles	men	women
Doubles	men	women
← 2013 ·	Seguros Bolívar Open Medellín	· 2015 →

Austin Krajicek won his maiden ATP Challenger Tour singles title, beating João Souza 7–5, 6–3

== Seeds ==
1. (Colombia) Alejandro González (quarterfinals)
2. (Argentina) Facundo Bagnis (semifinals)
3. (Brazil) João Souza (final)
4. (Argentina) Guido Pella (first round)
5. (United States) Wayne Odesnik (second round)
6. (Brazil) Guilherme Clezar (quarterfinals)
7. (Chile) Gonzalo Lama (quarterfinals)
8. (United States) Austin Krajicek (champion)

== Draw ==
=== Key ===
- Q = Qualifier
- WC = Wild card
- LL = Lucky loser
- Alt = Alternate
- SE = Special exempt
- PR = Protected ranking
- ITF = ITF entry
- JE = Junior exempt
- w/o = Walkover
- r = Retired
- d = Defaulted
- SR = Special ranking

=== Finals ===
Semifinals
8	(United States) Austin Krajicek	6	3	6
(Brazil) André Ghem	3	6	3
3	(Brazil) João Souza	7	6
2	(Argentina) Facundo Bagnis	5	4

Final
8	(United States) Austin Krajicek	7	6
3	(Brazil) João Souza	5	3

=== Top half ===
First round
1	(Colombia) A González	6	7^{7}
Q	(Brazil) B Sant'Anna	3	6^{4}
(Greece) T Angelinos	4	4
Q	(Brazil) F de Paula	6	6
(Ecuador) G Lapentti	5	6	6
(Colombia) N Barrientos	7	3	2
WC	(United States) David Konstantinov	2	1
8	(United States) A Krajicek	6	6
4	(Argentina) G Pella	4	7	4
Q	(El Salvador) M Arévalo	6	5	6
WC	(Colombia) C Salamanca	6	7^{7}
WC	(Colombia) J-C Spir	4	6^{4}
(Brazil) A Ghem	6	7^{7}
(Brazil) F Romboli	2	6^{3}
(Chile) N Jarry	6^{1}	3
5	(United States) W Odesnik	7^{7}	6

Second round
1	(Colombia) A González	6	6
Q	(Brazil) F de Paula	4	2
(Ecuador) G Lapentti	3	6	3
8	(United States) A Krajicek	6	3	6
Q	(El Salvador) M Arévalo	3	6	3
WC	(Colombia) C Salamanca	6	3	6
(Brazil) A Ghem	6	3	6
5	(United States) W Odesnik	2	6	3

Quarterfinals
1	(Colombia) A González	7^{10}	3	6^{5}
8	(United States) A Krajicek	6^{8}	6	7^{7}
WC	(Colombia) C Salamanca
(Brazil) A Ghem	^{w/o}

Semifinals
8	(United States) A Krajicek	6	3	6
(Brazil) A Ghem	3	6	3

=== Bottom half ===
First round
6	(Brazil) G Clezar	6	6
(Argentina) R Olivo	4	2
(Uruguay) M Cuevas	4	4
(Argentina) T Lipovšek Puches	6	6
(Brazil) T Turini	6^{4}	5
(Dominican Republic) J Hernández	7^{7}	7
(Argentina) A Molteni	4	0
3	(Brazil) J Souza	6	6
7	(Chile) G Lama	6	6
(United States) K King	3	4
Q	(United States) D Novikov	1	3
(France) G Mina	6	6
(Argentina) M Trungelliti	6	6
(Bolivia) H Dellien	4	0
WC	(Colombia) M Quintero	2	3
2	(Argentina) F Bagnis	6	6

Second round
6	(Brazil) G Clezar	6	7
(Argentina) T Lipovšek Puches	2	5
(Dominican Republic) J Hernández	7^{7}	1	6^{12}
3	(Brazil) J Souza	6^{3}	6	7^{14}
7	(Chile) G Lama	4	6	7^{7}
(France) G Mina	6	3	6^{5}
(Argentina) M Trungelliti	4	7	6^{3}
2	(Argentina) F Bagnis	6	5	7^{7}

Quarterfinals
6	(Brazil) G Clezar	4	4
3	(Brazil) J Souza	6	6
7	(Chile) G Lama	1	4
2	(Argentina) F Bagnis	6	6

Semifinals
3	(Brazil) J Souza	7	6
2	(Argentina) F Bagnis	5	4
