= 2014 Seguros Bolívar Open Medellín – Men's doubles =

Men's doubles
- 2014 Seguros Bolívar Open Medellín

Final
- Champions: (United States) Austin Krajicek (Mexico) César Ramírez
- Runners-up: (Venezuela) Roberto Maytín (Argentina) Andrés Molteni
- Score: 6–3, 7–5

Events
Singles	men	women
Doubles	men	women
← 2013 ·	Seguros Bolívar Open Medellín	· 2015 →

Austin Krajicek and César Ramírez won the title, beating Roberto Maytín and Andrés Molteni 6–3, 7–5

== Seeds ==
1. (United States) Austin Krajicek / (Mexico) César Ramírez (champions)
2. (Colombia) Juan-Carlos Spir / (United States) Kevin King (first round)
3. (Colombia) Nicolás Barrientos / (Colombia) Carlos Salamanca (SemiFinals)
4. (Venezuela) Roberto Maytín / (Argentina) Andrés Molteni (final)

== Draw ==
=== Key ===
- Q = Qualifier
- WC = Wild card
- LL = Lucky loser
- Alt = Alternate
- ITF = ITF entry
- PR = Protected ranking
- SR = Special ranking
- SE = Special exempt
- JE = Junior exempt
- JR = Junior Accelerator Programme entrant
- CO = College Accelerator Programme entrant
- NG = Next Gen Accelerator Program entrant
- w/o = Walkover
- r = Retired
- d = Defaulted

=== Draw ===
First round
1	(United States) A Krajicek (Mexico) C Ramírez	6	6
(Uruguay) A Behar (Argentina) R Olivo	3	4
WC	(United States) Sam Barnett (United States) K Kim	2	4
(Venezuela) LD Martínez (Colombia) E Struvay	6	6
3	(Colombia) N Barrientos (Colombia) C Salamanca	6	6^{4}	[10]
(Argentina) J I Londero (Argentina) G Pella	4	7^{7}	[6]
WC	(Colombia) Tomas Builes (Argentina) F Mena	6^{4}	7^{8}	[8]
(Chile) N Jarry (Puerto Rico) A Llompart	7^{7}	6^{6}	[10]
(Brazil) M Demoliner (Brazil) J Souza	2	3
(Argentina) F Bagnis (Argentina) M Trungelliti	6	6
WC	(Colombia) Felipe Mantilla (Colombia) M Quintero	2	6	[5]
4	(Venezuela) R Maytín (Argentina) A Molteni	2	[10]
(Brazil) A Ghem (Brazil) F Romboli	3	7^{7}	[6]
(Bolivia) H Dellien (Peru) S Galdós	6	6^{3}	[10]
(Brazil) G Clezar (Brazil) F de Paula	6	7^{9}
2	(Colombia) J-C Spir (United States) K King	4	6^{7}

Quarterfinals
1	(United States) A Krajicek (Mexico) C Ramírez	6	6
(Venezuela) LD Martínez (Colombia) E Struvay	4	3
3	(Colombia) N Barrientos (Colombia) C Salamanca	6	7
(Chile) N Jarry (Puerto Rico) A Llompart	4	5
(Argentina) F Bagnis (Argentina) M Trungelliti	3	6	[3]
4	(Venezuela) R Maytín (Argentina) A Molteni	6	2	[10]
(Bolivia) H Dellien (Peru) S Galdós	5	6^{8}
(Brazil) G Clezar (Brazil) F de Paula	7	7^{10}

Semifinals
1	(United States) A Krajicek (Mexico) C Ramírez	w/o
3	(Colombia) N Barrientos (Colombia) C Salamanca
4	(Venezuela) R Maytín (Argentina) A Molteni	6	6
(Brazil) G Clezar (Brazil) F de Paula	1	1

Final
1	(United States) A Krajicek (Mexico) C Ramírez	6	7
4	(Venezuela) R Maytín (Argentina) A Molteni	3	5
