= 2017 Claro Open Medellín – Doubles =

Ahangama

Doubles
- 2017 Claro Open Medellín

Final
- Champions: (Barbados) Darian King (Mexico) Miguel Ángel Reyes-Varela
- Runners-up: (Chile) Nicolás Jarry (Ecuador) Roberto Quiroz
- Score: 6–4, 6–4

Events
| Singles | Doubles |
| ← 2016 · | Claro Open Medellín | · 2018 → |

Alejandro Falla and Eduardo Struvay were the defending champions but chose not to defend their title.

Darian King and Miguel Ángel Reyes-Varela won the title after defeating Nicolás Jarry and Roberto Quiroz 6–4, 6–4 in the final.

== Seeds ==
1. (Chile) Nicolás Jarry / (Ecuador) Roberto Quiroz (final)
2. (El Salvador) Marcelo Arévalo / (Brazil) João Souza (withdrew)
3. (Argentina) Facundo Argüello / (Argentina) Facundo Mena (semifinals)
4. (Barbados) Darian King / (Mexico) Miguel Ángel Reyes-Varela (champions)

== Draw ==
=== Key ===
- Q = Qualifier
- WC = Wild card
- LL = Lucky loser
- Alt = Alternate
- SE = Special exempt
- PR = Protected ranking
- ITF = ITF entry
- JE = Junior exempt
- w/o = Walkover
- r = Retired
- d = Defaulted
- SR = Special ranking

First round
1 | (Chile) N Jarry (Ecuador) R Quiroz | 6 | 6
(Dominican Republic) J Hernández-Fernández (Peru) JP Varillas | 3 | 4
(Colombia) DE Galán (Colombia) A González | 2 | 6^{3}
(Argentina) MF Descotte (Argentina) G Villanueva | 6 | 7^{7}
3 | (Argentina) F Argüello (Argentina) F Mena | 6 | 6
WC | (Colombia) Felipe Mantilla (Colombia) C Salamanca | 4 | 2
(Guatemala) C Díaz Figueroa (Argentina) Juan Ignacio Galarza | 3 | 6 | [10]
(Brazil) E Russi Assumpção (Brazil) N Santos | 6 | 1 | [12]
(Dominican Republic) V Estrella Burgos (Dominican Republic) J Olivares | 6 | 6
(Peru) M Echazú (United States) A El Mihdawy | 4 | 3
(Colombia) JS Gómez (Colombia) C Rodríguez | 1 | 1
4 | (Barbados) D King (Mexico) MÁ Reyes-Varela | 6 | 6
WC | (Colombia) Sergio Luis Hernández Ramírez (Colombia) Pedro Uribe | 6^{4} | 6 | [10]
WC | (Ecuador) Gabriel Carvajal (United States) Charles Force | 7^{7} | 4 | [8]
(Ecuador) I Endara (New Zealand) J Statham | 3 | 6 | [11]
Alt | (Argentina) Franco Emanuel Egea (United States) Evan Song | 6 | 1 | [9]

Quarterfinals
1 | (Chile) N Jarry (Ecuador) R Quiroz | 4 | 6 | [10]
(Argentina) MF Descotte (Argentina) G Villanueva | 6 | 4 | [5]
3 | (Argentina) F Argüello (Argentina) F Mena | 4 | 7 | [10]
(Brazil) E Russi Assumpção (Brazil) N Santos | 6 | 5 | [7]
(Dominican Republic) V Estrella Burgos (Dominican Republic) J Olivares | 2 | 2
4 | (Barbados) D King (Mexico) MÁ Reyes-Varela | 6 | 6
WC | (Colombia) SL Hernández Ramírez (Colombia) P Uribe | 2 | 1
(Ecuador) I Endara (New Zealand) J Statham | 6 | 6

Semifinals
1 | (Chile) N Jarry (Ecuador) R Quiroz | 6 | 6
3 | (Argentina) F Argüello (Argentina) F Mena | 1 | 4
4 | (Barbados) D King (Mexico) MÁ Reyes-Varela | w/o
(Ecuador) I Endara (New Zealand) J Statham

Final
1 | (Chile) N Jarry (Ecuador) R Quiroz | 4 | 4
4 | (Barbados) D King (Mexico) MÁ Reyes-Varela | 6 | 6
