= 2013 Seguros Bolívar Open Medellín – Doubles =

Doubles
- 2013 Seguros Bolívar Open Medellín

Final
- Champions: (Ecuador) Emilio Gómez (Moldova) Roman Borvanov
- Runners-up: (Colombia) Nicolás Barrientos (Colombia) Eduardo Struvay
- Score: 6–3, 7–6^{(7–4)}

Events
Singles	Doubles
← 2012 ·	Seguros Bolívar Open Medellín	· 2014 →

Nicholas Monroe and Simon Stadler were the defending champions but decided not to participate.
Emilio Gómez and Roman Borvanov won the final 6–3, 7–6^{(7–4)} against Nicolás Barrientos and Eduardo Struvay.

== Seeds ==
1. (United States) James Cerretani / (Canada) Adil Shamasdin (first round)
2. (Brazil) Fabiano de Paula / (Peru) Sergio Galdós (withdrew)
3. (Colombia) Alejandro González / (Colombia) Carlos Salamanca (quarterfinals)
4. (Colombia) Nicolás Barrientos / (Colombia) Eduardo Struvay (final)

== Draw ==
=== Key ===
- Q = Qualifier
- WC = Wild card
- LL = Lucky loser
- Alt = Alternate
- ITF = ITF entry
- PR = Protected ranking
- SR = Special ranking
- SE = Special exempt
- JE = Junior exempt
- JR = Junior Accelerator Programme entrant
- CO = College Accelerator Programme entrant
- NG = Next Gen Accelerator Program entrant
- w/o = Walkover
- r = Retired
- d = Defaulted

=== Draw ===
First round
1	(United States) J Cerretani (Canada) A Shamasdin	5	5
(Brazil) A Miele (Brazil) J Pereira	7	7
(Argentina) G Andreozzi (Peru) D Beretta	1	6	[10]
WC	(Ecuador) G Lapentti (Argentina) E Schwank	6	3	[3]
4	(Colombia) N Barrientos (Colombia) E Struvay	6	6
(Peru) M Echazú (Ecuador) I Endara	3	3
WC	(Colombia) Jhan Fontalvo Silva (Colombia) Felipe Mantilla	4	2
(Ecuador) R Quiroz (Argentina) A Velotti	6	6
(Dominican Republic) V Estrella Burgos (Dominican Republic) J Hernández	6	6
(Argentina) F Argüello (Argentina) JI Londero	1	3
(El Salvador) M Arévalo (Colombia) M Quintero	6	4	[8]
3	(Colombia) A González (Colombia) C Salamanca	4	6	[10]
(Brazil) F Neis (Brazil) T Turini	6	6
WC	(United States) Sam Barnett (Ecuador) D Hidalgo	0	1
(Moldova) R Borvanov (Ecuador) E Gómez	6	6
Alt	(Colombia) Felipe Escobar (Colombia) DE Galán	4	3

Quarterfinals
(Brazil) A Miele (Brazil) J Pereira	3	3
(Argentina) G Andreozzi (Peru) D Beretta	6	6
4	(Colombia) N Barrientos (Colombia) E Struvay	6	6^{5}	[10]
(Ecuador) R Quiroz (Argentina) A Velotti	1	7^{7}	[7]
(Dominican Republic) V Estrella Burgos (Dominican Republic) J Hernández	6	3	[10]
3	(Colombia) A González (Colombia) C Salamanca	4	6	[6]
(Brazil) F Neis (Brazil) T Turini	4	0
(Moldova) R Borvanov (Ecuador) E Gómez	6	6

Semifinals
(Argentina) G Andreozzi (Peru) D Beretta	6	1	[5]
4	(Colombia) N Barrientos (Colombia) E Struvay	4	6	[10]
(Dominican Republic) V Estrella Burgos (Dominican Republic) J Hernández	5	6	[8]
(Moldova) R Borvanov (Ecuador) E Gómez	7	3	[10]

Final
(Colombia) N Barrientos (Colombia) E Struvay	3	6^{4}
(Moldova) R Borvanov (Ecuador) E Gómez	6	7^{7}
