= 2017 Claro Open Medellín – Singles =

Singles
- 2017 Claro Open Medellín

Final
- Champion: (Chile) Nicolás Jarry
- Runner-up: (Brazil) João Souza
- Score: 6–1, 3–6, 7–6^{(7–0)}

Events
| Singles | Doubles |
| ← 2016 · | Claro Open Medellín | · 2018 → |

Facundo Bagnis was the defending champion but chose not to defend his title.

Nicolás Jarry won the title after defeating João Souza 6–1, 3–6, 7–6^{(7–0)} in the final.

== Seeds ==
1. (Dominican Republic) Víctor Estrella Burgos (first round)
2. (Barbados) Darian King (semifinals)
3. (Brazil) João Souza (final)
4. (Chile) Nicolás Jarry (champion)
5. (El Salvador) Marcelo Arévalo (second round)
6. (Ecuador) Roberto Quiroz (quarterfinals)
7. (Dominican Republic) José Hernández-Fernández (second round)
8. (France) Maxime Hamou (withdrew)

== Draw ==
=== Key ===
- Q = Qualifier
- WC = Wild card
- LL = Lucky loser
- Alt = Alternate
- SE = Special exempt
- PR = Protected ranking
- ITF = ITF entry
- JE = Junior exempt
- w/o = Walkover
- r = Retired
- d = Defaulted
- SR = Special ranking

=== Finals ===
Semifinals
(New Zealand) José Statham | 6^{7} | 5
4 | (Chile) Nicolás Jarry | 7^{9} | 7
3 | (Brazil) João Souza | 6 | 6
2 | (Barbados) Darian King | 3 | 4

Final
4 | (Chile) Nicolás Jarry | 6 | 3 | 7^{7}
3 | (Brazil) João Souza | 1 | 6 | 6^{0}

=== Top half ===
First round
1 | (Dominican Republic) V Estrella Burgos | 3 | 6 | 3
(New Zealand) J Statham | 6 | 3 | 6
WC | (United States) Charles Force | 4 | 3
Q | (Venezuela) D Souto | 6 | 6
(Colombia) JS Gómez | 3 | 2
(Colombia) A González | 6 | 6
Q | (Guatemala) C Díaz Figueroa | 2 | 7^{7} | 3
7 | (Dominican Republic) J Hernández-Fernández | 6 | 6^{5} | 6
4 | (Chile) N Jarry | 6 | 6
(Brazil) N Santos | 3 | 3
(Argentina) F Mena | 3 | 4
(Peru) JP Varillas | 6 | 6
(Colombia) DE Galán | 6 | 7^{7}
(Argentina) F Argüello | 4 | 6^{3}
(United States) A El Mihdawy | 6 | 6
LL | (Chile) Michel Vernier | 4 | 2

Second round
(New Zealand) J Statham | 6 | 6
Q | (Venezuela) D Souto | 3 | 3
(Colombia) A González | 6 | 6
7 | (Dominican Republic) J Hernández-Fernández | 1 | 3
4 | (Chile) N Jarry | 6 | 5 | 6
(Peru) JP Varillas | 3 | 7 | 4
(Colombia) DE Galán | 6 | 7
(United States) A El Mihdawy | 4 | 5

Quarterfinals
(New Zealand) J Statham | 6 | 6
(Colombia) A González | 4 | 4
4 | (Chile) N Jarry | 7^{7} | 6
(Colombia) DE Galán | 6^{4} | 3

Semifinals
(New Zealand) J Statham | 6^{7} | 5
4 | (Chile) N Jarry | 7^{9} | 7

=== Bottom half ===
First round
5 | (El Salvador) M Arévalo | 6 | 7^{7}
(Colombia) Felipe Mantilla | 3 | 6^{4}
Q | (Argentina) Franco Emanuel Egea | 7^{7} | 4 | 6^{5}
WC | (Colombia) C Salamanca | 6^{3} | 6 | 7^{7}
WC | (Colombia) Sergio Luis Hernández Ramírez | 4 | 6 | 6
WC | (Ecuador) Gabriel Carvajal | 6 | 1 | 2
(United States) Evan Song | 1 | 4
3 | (Brazil) J Souza | 6 | 6
6 | (Ecuador) R Quiroz | 6 | 6
Q | (Dominican Republic) J Olivares | 3 | 3
(Ecuador) I Endara | 3 | 1
(Colombia) C Rodríguez | 6 | 6
(Argentina) G Villanueva | 1 | 6 | 6^{3}
(Argentina) Juan Ignacio Galarza | 6 | 4 | 7^{7}
LL | (Bolivia) A Mendoza | 2 | 0
2 | (Barbados) D King | 6 | 6

Second round
5 | (El Salvador) M Arévalo | 7^{7} | 4 | 6^{5}
WC | (Colombia) C Salamanca | 6^{3} | 6 | 7^{7}
WC | (Colombia) SL Hernández Ramírez | 2 | 1
3 | (Brazil) J Souza | 6 | 6
6 | (Ecuador) R Quiroz | 7^{7} | 6
(Colombia) C Rodríguez | 6^{5} | 3
(Argentina) JI Galarza | 2 | 5
2 | (Barbados) D King | 6 | 7

Quarterfinals
WC | (Colombia) C Salamanca | 6^{4} | 6^{5}
3 | (Brazil) J Souza | 7^{7} | 7^{7}
6 | (Ecuador) R Quiroz | 6^{3} | 6 | 3
2 | (Barbados) D King | 7^{7} | 4 | 6

Semifinals
3 | (Brazil) J Souza | 6 | 6
2 | (Barbados) D King | 3 | 4
