= 2012 Seguros Bolívar Open Medellín – Doubles =

Doubles
- 2012 Seguros Bolívar Open Medellín

Final
- Champions: (United States) Nicholas Monroe (Germany) Simon Stadler
- Runners-up: (Argentina) Renzo Olivo (Argentina) Marco Trungelliti
- Score: 6–4, 6–4

Events
Singles	Doubles
← 2011 ·	Seguros Bolívar Open Medellín	· 2013 →

Paul Capdeville and Nicolás Massú were the defending champions but decided not to participate.
Nicholas Monroe and Simon Stadler won the final 6–4, 6–4 against Renzo Olivo and Marco Trungelliti.

== Seeds ==
1. (United States) Nicholas Monroe / (Germany) Simon Stadler (champions)
2. (Brazil) Marcelo Demoliner / (Brazil) João Souza (withdrew)
3. (Colombia) Juan Sebastián Cabal / (Spain) Rubén Ramírez Hidalgo (quarterfinals)
4. (Argentina) Martín Alund / (Peru) Duilio Beretta (quarterfinals)

== Draw ==
=== Key ===
- Q = Qualifier
- WC = Wild card
- LL = Lucky loser
- Alt = Alternate
- SE = Special exempt
- PR = Protected ranking
- ITF = ITF entry
- JE = Junior exempt
- w/o = Walkover
- r = Retired
- d = Defaulted
- SR = Special ranking

=== Draw ===
First round
1	(United States) N Monroe (Germany) S Stadler	6	6
WC	(Argentina) L Mayer (Argentina) Martin Rios-Benitez	0	1
(Chile) J Aguilar (United States) D Zivkovic	6	6
(Ecuador) JC Campozano (Colombia) C Salamanca	4	1
3	(Colombia) JS Cabal (Spain) R Ramírez Hidalgo	6	6
WC	(Colombia) Francisco Franco (Colombia) Magin Ortiga	3	3
(United States) Sam Barnett (United States) K Kim	2	3
(Portugal) F Gil (Portugal) P Sousa	6	6
(Philippines) R Gonzales (Australia) Chris Letcher	2	3
(Argentina) R Olivo (Argentina) M Trungelliti	6	6
(Colombia) N Barrientos (Colombia) M Quintero	2	4
4	(Argentina) M Alund (Peru) D Beretta	6	6
(Brazil) Fabiano de Paula (Brazil) A Ghem	4	7^{10}	[8]
(Moldova) R Borvanov (United States) A El Mihdawy	6	6^{8}	[10]
(Colombia) A González (Colombia) Sebastian Serrano	6	6
Alt	(Italy) Enrico Becuzzi (Italy) P Lorenzi	3	2

Quarterfinals
1	(United States) N Monroe (Germany) S Stadler	7^{7}	6
(Chile) J Aguilar (United States) D Zivkovic	6^{3}	2
3	(Colombia) JS Cabal (Spain) R Ramírez Hidalgo	4	4
(Portugal) F Gil (Portugal) P Sousa	6	6
(Argentina) R Olivo (Argentina) M Trungelliti	6	6
4	(Argentina) M Alund (Peru) D Beretta	1	3
(Moldova) R Borvanov (United States) A El Mihdawy	6^{4}	7^{7}	[10]
(Colombia) A González (Colombia) S Serrano	7^{7}	6^{5}	[3]

Semifinals
1	(United States) N Monroe (Germany) S Stadler	4	6	[11]
(Portugal) F Gil (Portugal) P Sousa	6	4	[9]
(Argentina) R Olivo (Argentina) M Trungelliti	6	3	[10]
(Moldova) R Borvanov (United States) A El Mihdawy	4	6	[7]

Final
1	(United States) N Monroe (Germany) S Stadler	6	6
(Argentina) R Olivo (Argentina) M Trungelliti	4	4
