= 2012 Seguros Bolívar Open Medellín – Singles =

Singles
- 2012 Seguros Bolívar Open Medellín

Final
- Champion: (Italy) Paolo Lorenzi
- Runner-up: (Argentina) Leonardo Mayer
- Score: 7–6^{(7–5)}, 6–7^{(4–7)}, 6–4

Events
Singles	Doubles
← 2011 ·	Seguros Bolívar Open Medellín	· 2013 →

Víctor Estrella was the defending champion but did not participate.
Paolo Lorenzi defeated Leonardo Mayer 7–6^{(7–5)}, 6–7^{(4–7)}, 6–4 in the final to win the title.

== Seeds ==
1. (Argentina) Leonardo Mayer (final)
2. (Italy) Paolo Lorenzi (champion)
3. (Spain) Rubén Ramírez Hidalgo (second round)
4. (Argentina) Martín Alund (first round)
5. (Brazil) João Souza (quarterfinals)
6. (Portugal) Frederico Gil (quarterfinals)
7. (United States) Wayne Odesnik (quarterfinals)
8. (Chile) Jorge Aguilar (first round)

== Draw ==
=== Key ===
- Q = Qualifier
- WC = Wild card
- LL = Lucky loser
- Alt = Alternate
- SE = Special exempt
- PR = Protected ranking
- ITF = ITF entry
- JE = Junior exempt
- w/o = Walkover
- r = Retired
- d = Defaulted
- SR = Special ranking

=== Finals ===
Semifinals
1	(Argentina) Leonardo Mayer	4	6	7^{7}
WC	(Colombia) Juan Sebastián Cabal	6	1	6^{2}
(Brazil) Fabiano de Paula	3	5
2	(Italy) Paolo Lorenzi	6	7

Final
1	(Argentina) Leonardo Mayer	6^{5}	7^{7}	4
2	(Italy) Paolo Lorenzi	7^{7}	6^{4}	6

=== Top half ===
First round
1	(Argentina) L Mayer	6	7^{7}
Q	(Philippines) R Gonzales	2	6^{4}
(Argentina) R Olivo	7^{13}	6
WC	(Colombia) Felipe Escobar	6^{11}	2
(Portugal) P Sousa	3	2
(Brazil) A Ghem	6	6
(Brazil) M Demoliner	3	0^{r}
5	(Brazil) J Souza	6	1
3	(Spain) R Ramírez Hidalgo	6	7^{7}
WC	(Colombia) M Quintero	4	6^{3}
(Ecuador) JC Campozano	4	6	3
(Colombia) N Barrientos	6	3	6
WC	(Colombia) JS Cabal	7^{7}	6
(United States) D Zivkovic	6^{2}	3
(Brazil) J Silva	5	7^{7}	6
8	(Chile) J Aguilar	7	6^{1}	3

Second round
1	(Argentina) L Mayer	7^{7}	6^{4}	7^{7}
(Argentina) R Olivo	6^{4}	7^{7}	6^{2}
(Brazil) A Ghem	4	4
5	(Brazil) J Souza	6	6
3	(Spain) R Ramírez Hidalgo	4	2
(Colombia) N Barrientos	6	6
WC	(Colombia) JS Cabal	6	6
(Brazil) J Silva	4	4

Quarterfinals
1	(Argentina) L Mayer	6	6^{3}	7^{7}
5	(Brazil) J Souza	4	7^{7}	6^{4}
(Colombia) N Barrientos	6^{4}	6^{3}
WC	(Colombia) JS Cabal	7^{7}	7^{7}

Semifinals
1	(Argentina) L Mayer	4	6	7^{7}
WC	(Colombia) JS Cabal	6	1	6^{2}

=== Bottom half ===
First round
7	(United States) W Odesnik	6	6
WC	(United States) K Kim	3	2
(United States) A El Mihdawy	1	2
(Russia) Aleksandr Lobkov	6	6
(Moldova) R Borvanov	6	3	4
(Brazil) Fabiano de Paula	3	6	6
(Colombia) C Salamanca	7	6
4	(Argentina) M Alund	5	1
6	(Portugal) F Gil	6	6
Q	(Argentina) Martin Rios-Benitez	4	2
Q	(Colombia) Steffen Zornosa	3	1
Q	(Australia) Chris Letcher	6	6
(Colombia) A González	7^{7}	6
(Peru) D Beretta	6^{2}	2
(Argentina) M Trungelliti	5	1
2	(Italy) P Lorenzi	7	6

Second round
7	(United States) W Odesnik	6	6
(Russia) A Lobkov	3	2
(Brazil) F de Paula	7^{11}	6
(Colombia) C Salamanca	6^{9}	3
6	(Portugal) F Gil	3	6	7
Q	(Australia) C Letcher	6	3	5
(Colombia) A González	6^{5}	3
2	(Italy) P Lorenzi	7^{7}	6

Quarterfinals
7	(United States) W Odesnik	4	6^{4}
(Brazil) F de Paula	6	7^{7}
6	(Portugal) F Gil	6	3	3
2	(Italy) P Lorenzi	3	6	6

Semifinals
(Brazil) F de Paula	3	5
2	(Italy) P Lorenzi	6	7
