= 2010 Seguros Bolívar Open Medellín =

- Date: 1 – 7 November
- Edition: 7th
- Location: Medellín, Colombia

Champions

Singles
- (Brazil) Marcos Daniel

Doubles
- (Colombia) Juan Sebastián Cabal / (Colombia) Robert Farah
| ← 2009 · | Seguros Bolívar Open Medellín | · 2011 → |

The 2010 Seguros Bolívar Open Medellín was a professional tennis tournament played on outdoor red clay courts. It was the seventh edition of the tournament which was part of the 2010 ATP Challenger Tour. It took place in Medellín, Colombia between 1 and 7 November 2010.

== ATP entrants ==
=== Seeds ===
| Country | Player | Rank^{1} | Seed |
|---|---|---|---|
| ARG | Horacio Zeballos | 77 | 1 |
| ARG | Carlos Berlocq | 80 | 2 |
| ARG | Brian Dabul | 86 | 3 |
| POR | Rui Machado | 95 | 4 |
| BRA | João Souza | 101 | 5 |
| KAZ | Yuri Schukin | 129 | 6 |
| CHI | Nicolás Massú | 142 | 7 |
| ESP | Daniel Muñoz-de la Nava | 146 | 8 |

- Rankings are as of October 25, 2010.

=== Other entrants ===
The following players received wildcards into the singles main draw:

- (Colombia) Alejandro González
- (United States) Eric Nunez
- (Colombia) Eduardo Struvay
- (Argentina) Martín Vassallo Argüello

The following players received entry from the qualifying draw:

- (Italy) Andrea Arnaboldi
- (France) Axel Michon
- (Italy) Gianluca Naso
- (Brazil) Eládio Ribeiro Neto

== Champions ==
=== Singles ===
(Brazil) Marcos Daniel def. (Colombia) Juan Sebastián Cabal, 6–3, 7–5

=== Doubles ===
(Colombia) Juan Sebastián Cabal / (Colombia) Robert Farah def. (Brazil) Franco Ferreiro / (Brazil) André Sá, 6–3, 7–5
