= 2016 Claro Open Medellín – Men's doubles =

Men's doubles
- 2016 Claro Open Medellín

Final
- Champions: (Colombia) Alejandro Falla (Colombia) Eduardo Struvay
- Runners-up: (Brazil) André Ghem (Spain) Juan Lizariturry
- Score: 6–3, 6–2

Events
Singles	men	women
Doubles	men	women
- Claro Open Medellín

Nicolás Barrientos and Eduardo Struvay were the defending champions but chose to participate with different partners. Barrientos partnered Ruben Gonzales while Struvay partnered Alejandro Falla. Barrientos lost in the first round to Gonzalo Escobar and Juan Ignacio Londero.

Struvay successfully defended his title with Falla, defeating André Ghem and Juan Lizariturry 6–3, 6–2 in the final.

== Seeds ==
1. (Colombia) Nicolás Barrientos / (Philippines) Ruben Gonzales (first round)
2. (Brazil) Fernando Romboli / (Brazil) Caio Zampieri (semifinals)
3. (Colombia) Alejandro Falla / (Colombia) Eduardo Struvay (champions)
4. (Brazil) André Ghem / (Spain) Juan Lizariturry (final)

== Draw ==
Key

- Q = Qualifier
- WC = Wild card
- LL = Lucky loser
- Alt = Alternate
- ITF = ITF entry
- PR = Protected ranking
- SR = Special ranking
- SE = Special exempt
- JE = Junior exempt
- JR = Junior Accelerator Programme entrant
- CO = College Accelerator Programme entrant
- NG = Next Gen Accelerator Program entrant
- w/o = Walkover
- r = Retired
- d = Defaulted

First round
1	(Colombia) N Barrientos (Philippines) R Gonzales	6	2	[8]
(Ecuador) G Escobar (Argentina) JI Londero	1	6	[10]
WC	(Colombia) DE Galán (Colombia) Sergio Luis Hernández Ramírez	5	3
(Brazil) O Luz (Brazil) M Zormann	7	6
4	(Brazil) A Ghem (Spain) J Lizariturry	6	6
(Chile) Bastián Malla (Chile) G Rivera-Aránguiz	2	1
WC	(Colombia) Felipe Mantilla (Colombia) Sebastián Serrano	4	7	[11]
WC	(Colombia) José Daniel Bendeck (Argentina) Gregorio Cordonnier	6	5	[9]
(Argentina) F Mena (Chile) Jorge Montero	w/o
(Argentina) A Collarini (Chile) G Lama
Alt	(Brazil) R Matos (Brazil) J Menezes	2	3
3	(Colombia) A Falla (Colombia) E Struvay	6	6
(Brazil) R Hocevar (Brazil) J Pereira	6	3	[10]
(Uruguay) M Felder (Argentina) R Olivo	3	6	[3]
(Sweden) C Lindell (Brazil) B Sant'Anna
2	(Brazil) F Romboli (Brazil) C Zampieri	w/o

Quarterfinals
(Ecuador) G Escobar (Argentina) JI Londero	6	7
(Brazil) O Luz (Brazil) M Zormann	3	5
4	(Brazil) A Ghem (Spain) J Lizariturry	6	6
WC	(Colombia) F Mantilla (Colombia) S Serrano	4	4
(Argentina) F Mena (Chile) J Montero	4	4
3	(Colombia) A Falla (Colombia) E Struvay	6	6
(Brazil) R Hocevar (Brazil) J Pereira	4	1
2	(Brazil) F Romboli (Brazil) C Zampieri	6	6

Semifinals
(Ecuador) G Escobar (Argentina) JI Londero	3	7^{7}	[5]
4	(Brazil) A Ghem (Spain) J Lizariturry	6	6^{1}	[10]
3	(Colombia) A Falla (Colombia) E Struvay	6	6
2	(Brazil) F Romboli (Brazil) C Zampieri	4	3

Final
4	(Brazil) A Ghem (Spain) J Lizariturry	3	2
3	(Colombia) A Falla (Colombia) E Struvay	6	6
