= 2011 Seguros Bolívar Open Medellín – Doubles =

Doubles
- 2011 Seguros Bolívar Open Medellín

Final
- Champions: (Chile) Paul Capdeville (Chile) Nicolás Massú
- Runners-up: (Italy) Alessio di Mauro (Italy) Matteo Viola
- Score: 6–2, 4–6, [10–8]

Events
Singles	Doubles
← 2010 ·	Seguros Bolívar Open Medellín	· 2012 →

Juan Sebastián Cabal and Robert Farah were the defending champions but Farah decided not to participate.
Cabal partners up with Alejandro Falla, losing in the first round.
Paul Capdeville and Nicolás Massú won the title, defeating Alessio di Mauro and Matteo Viola in the final.

== Seeds ==
1. (Colombia) Juan Sebastián Cabal / (Colombia) Alejandro Falla (first round)
2. (United States) Maciek Sykut / (United States) Denis Zivkovic (semifinals)
3. (Chile) Jorge Aguilar / (Chile) Guillermo Rivera-Aránguiz (first round)
4. (Italy) Alessio di Mauro / (Italy) Matteo Viola (final)

== Draw ==
Key

- Q = Qualifier
- WC = Wild card
- LL = Lucky loser
- Alt = Alternate
- ITF = ITF entry
- PR = Protected ranking
- SR = Special ranking
- SE = Special exempt
- JE = Junior exempt
- JR = Junior Accelerator Programme entrant
- CO = College Accelerator Programme entrant
- NG = Next Gen Accelerator Program entrant
- w/o = Walkover
- r = Retired
- d = Defaulted

=== Draw ===
First round
1	(Colombia) JS Cabal (Colombia) A Falla	4	6	[7]
(Colombia) C Salamanca (Colombia) E Struvay	6	3	[10]
WC	(Colombia) A González (Colombia) M Quintero	3	6	[10]
WC	(Colombia) N Barrientos (Colombia) Sebastián Serrano	6	3	[4]
3	(Chile) J Aguilar (Chile) G Rivera-Aránguiz	7^{7}	6^{3}	[3]
(Ecuador) I Endara (Argentina) H Zeballos	6^{5}	7^{7}	[10]
(Chile) P Capdeville (Chile) N Massú	6	6
(Argentina) S Decoud (Argentina) A Velotti	2	2
(Italy) A Giannessi (Italy) S Ianni	7^{7}	6
WC	(Colombia) Ricardo Martín (Colombia) Steffen Zornosa	6^{1}	1
(Spain) P Carreño-Busta (Chinese Taipei) H-h Lee	3	5
4	(Italy) A di Mauro (Italy) M Viola	6	7
(Ecuador) JC Campozano (Dominican Republic) V Estrella	6	1	[10]
(Italy) G Naso (Argentina) Nicolás Pastor	3	6	[8]
(France) N Devilder (France) É Prodon	6	4	[6]
2	(United States) M Sykut (United States) D Zivkovic	3	6	[10]

Quarterfinals
(Colombia) C Salamanca (Colombia) E Struvay	6	6
WC	(Colombia) A González (Colombia) M Quintero	4	4
(Ecuador) I Endara (Argentina) H Zeballos	1	4
(Chile) P Capdeville (Chile) N Massú	6	6
(Italy) A Giannessi (Italy) S Ianni	7	6^{2}	[6]
4	(Italy) A di Mauro (Italy) M Viola	5	7^{7}	[10]
(Ecuador) JC Campozano (Dominican Republic) V Estrella	1	3
2	(United States) M Sykut (United States) D Zivkovic	6	6

Semifinals
(Colombia) C Salamanca (Colombia) E Struvay	5	5
(Chile) P Capdeville (Chile) N Massú	7	7
4	(Italy) A di Mauro (Italy) M Viola	6	7
2	(United States) M Sykut (United States) D Zivkovic	4	5

Final
(Chile) P Capdeville (Chile) N Massú	6	4	[10]
4	(Italy) A di Mauro (Italy) M Viola	2	6	[8]
