= 2009 Seguros Bolívar Open Medellín – Singles =

Singles
- 2009 Seguros Bolívar Open Medellín

Final
- Champion: (Argentina) Juan Ignacio Chela
- Runner-up: (Brazil) João Souza
- Score: 6–4, 4–6, 6–4

Events
Singles	Doubles
← 2008 ·	Seguros Bolívar Open Medellín	· 2010 →

Leonardo Mayer chose to not defend his 2008 title.
Juan Ignacio Chela became the new champion, by beating João Souza 6–4, 4–6, 6–4 in the final match.

== Seeds ==
1. (Argentina) Juan Ignacio Chela (champion)
2. (Chile) Paul Capdeville (first round)
3. (Colombia) Santiago Giraldo (second round)
4. (Portugal) Rui Machado (first round)
5. (Chile) Nicolás Massú (first round)
6. (Spain) Pere Riba (semifinals)
7. (Brazil) Thiago Alves (first round)
8. (Argentina) Sergio Roitman (first round)

== Draw ==
=== Key ===
- Q = Qualifier
- WC = Wild card
- LL = Lucky loser
- Alt = Alternate
- SE = Special exempt
- PR = Protected ranking
- ITF = ITF entry
- JE = Junior exempt
- w/o = Walkover
- r = Retired
- d = Defaulted
- SR = Special ranking

=== Finals ===
Semifinals
1	(Argentina) Juan Ignacio Chela	6	6
(Argentina) Eduardo Schwank	3	2
6	(Spain) Pere Riba	5	4
(Brazil) João Souza	7	6

Final
1	(Argentina) Juan Ignacio Chela	6	4	6
(Brazil) João Souza	4	6	4

=== Top half ===
First round
1	(Argentina) JI Chela	6	5	6
(Monaco) B Balleret	4	7	4
(Brazil) J Silva	4	4
(France) G Rufin	6	6
(Ecuador) G Lapentti	4	4
(Brazil) R Hocevar	6	6
(Uruguay) M Felder	6	6
8	(Argentina) S Roitman	3	3
3	(Colombia) S Giraldo	7	7
Q	(Germany) L Pörschke	6^{4}	6^{5}
(Argentina) E Schwank	6	6
Q	(Chile) G Hormazábal	4	4
Q	(Romania) M Copil	4	4
ALT	(Argentina) M Alund	6	6
(Mexico) S González	6	6
5	(Chile) N Massú	2	4

Second round
1	(Argentina) JI Chela	7	6
(France) G Rufin	6^{4}	4
(Brazil) R Hocevar	7	6
(Uruguay) M Felder	5	4
3	(Colombia) S Giraldo	6	1
(Argentina) E Schwank	7	6
(Argentina) M Alund	7	4	6
(Mexico) S González	6^{4}	6	3

Quarterfinals
1	(Argentina) JI Chela	6	4	6
(Brazil) R Hocevar	4	6	2
(Argentina) E Schwank	6	6^{4}	6
(Argentina) M Alund	3	7	4

Semifinals
1	(Argentina) JI Chela	6	6
(Argentina) E Schwank	3	2

=== Bottom half ===
First round
6	(Spain) P Riba	6	6
WC	(Venezuela) R Corrente	2	1
(Argentina) D Junqueira	4	7	6
WC	(Colombia) E Struvay	6	6^{5}	3
(Spain) P Andújar	7	6
(Spain) D Marrero	6^{5}	2
WC	(Colombia) A González	7	4	6
4	(Portugal) R Machado	6^{5}	6	1
7	(Brazil) T Alves	4	7	1
(Brazil) J Souza	6	6^{3}	6
(Argentina) S Decoud	6	6^{7}	6
(Spain) I Cervantes Huegun	4	7	3
WC	(Serbia) F Krajinović	6^{6}	5
(Colombia) C Salamanca	7	7
Q	(Germany) A Begemann	6	6
2	(Chile) P Capdeville	4	3

Second round
6	(Spain) P Riba	6	7
(Argentina) D Junqueira	3	6^{6}
(Spain) P Andújar	7	6
WC	(Colombia) A González	5	2
(Brazil) J Souza	6	6
(Argentina) S Decoud	4	4
(Colombia) C Salamanca	6	7
Q	(Germany) A Begemann	3	6^{6}

Quarterfinals
6	(Spain) P Riba	6	4	6
(Spain) P Andújar	2	6	4
(Brazil) J Souza	7	4	6
(Colombia) C Salamanca	5	6	4

Semifinals
6	(Spain) P Riba	5	4
(Brazil) J Souza	7	6
