= 2010 Seguros Bolívar Open Medellín – Singles =

Singles
- 2010 Seguros Bolívar Open Medellín

Final
- Champion: (Brazil) Marcos Daniel
- Runner-up: (Colombia) Juan Sebastián Cabal
- Score: 6–3, 7–5

Events
Singles	Doubles
← 2009 ·	Seguros Bolívar Open Medellín	· 2011 →

Juan Ignacio Chela was the defending champion but decided not to participate.
Marcos Daniel won in the final 6–3, 7–5, against Juan Sebastián Cabal.

== Seeds ==
1. (Argentina) Horacio Zeballos (quarterfinals)
2. (Argentina) Carlos Berlocq (semifinals)
3. (Argentina) Brian Dabul (second round)
4. (Portugal) Rui Machado (quarterfinals)
5. (Brazil) João Souza (second round)
6. (Kazakhstan) Yuri Schukin (first round)
7. (Chile) Nicolás Massú (first round)
8. (Spain) Daniel Muñoz de la Nava (first round)

== Draw ==
=== Key ===
- Q = Qualifier
- WC = Wild card
- LL = Lucky loser
- Alt = Alternate
- SE = Special exempt
- PR = Protected ranking
- ITF = ITF entry
- JE = Junior exempt
- w/o = Walkover
- r = Retired
- d = Defaulted
- SR = Special ranking

=== Finals ===
Semifinals
(Colombia) Carlos Salamanca	4	7	4
(Colombia) Juan Sebastián Cabal	6	5	6
(Brazil) Marcos Daniel	6	7
2	(Argentina) Carlos Berlocq	2	6^{5}

Final
(Colombia) Juan Sebastián Cabal	3	5
(Brazil) Marcos Daniel	6	7

=== Top half ===
First round
1	(Argentina) H Zeballos	6	6
(Colombia) R Farah	4	4
Q	(Brazil) E Ribeiro Neto	7	6
WC	(United States) E Nunez	6^{3}	4
(Colombia) C Salamanca	6	7
(Argentina) D Junqueira	3	6^{5}
(Argentina) F Bagnis	6	6
7	(Chile) N Massú	4	4
4	(Portugal) R Machado	6	6
(Brazil) T Alves	3	1
(Brazil) R Hocevar	6^{11}	1
(France) É Prodon	7	6
(Colombia) JS Cabal	3	6	7
(France) G Rufin	6	3	6^{3}
(Mexico) S González	6	6^{6}	7
6	(Kazakhstan) Y Schukin	4	7	5

Second round
1	(Argentina) H Zeballos	6	6
Q	(Brazil) E Ribeiro Neto	4	3
(Colombia) C Salamanca	7	7
(Argentina) F Bagnis	5	6^{7}
4	(Portugal) R Machado	6	6
(France) É Prodon	4	2
(Colombia) JS Cabal	6	6
(Mexico) S González	3	2

Quarterfinals
1	(Argentina) H Zeballos	7	4	4
(Colombia) C Salamanca	6^{8}	6	6
4	(Portugal) R Machado	3	1
(Colombia) JS Cabal	6	6

Semifinals
(Colombia) C Salamanca	4	7	4
(Colombia) JS Cabal	6	5	6

=== Bottom half ===
First round
8	(Spain) D Muñoz de la Nava	5	1
(Portugal) L Tavares	7	6
Q	(Italy) G Naso	6	2	6
(Dominican Republic) V Estrella	3	6	1
WC	(Colombia) E Struvay	4	2
(Brazil) M Daniel	6	6
Q	(Italy) A Arnaboldi	3	2
3	(Argentina) B Dabul	6	6
5	(Brazil) J Souza	6	7
WC	(Colombia) A González	2	6^{5}
(Argentina) S Decoud	4	6	3
(Chile) P Capdeville	6	3	6
(Brazil) R Dutra da Silva	3	6	6
Q	(France) A Michon	6	0	4
WC	(Argentina) M Vassallo Argüello	2	1
2	(Argentina) C Berlocq	6	6

Second round
(Portugal) L Tavares	6	7
Q	(Italy) G Naso	4	5
(Brazil) M Daniel	6	5	6
3	(Argentina) B Dabul	3	7	4
5	(Brazil) J Souza	6^{7}	3
(Chile) P Capdeville	7	6
(Brazil) R Dutra da Silva	3	2
2	(Argentina) C Berlocq	6	6

Quarterfinals
(Portugal) L Tavares	6	6^{6}	4
(Brazil) M Daniel	3	7	6
(Chile) P Capdeville	4	5
2	(Argentina) C Berlocq	6	7

Semifinals
(Brazil) M Daniel	6	7
2	(Argentina) C Berlocq	2	6^{5}
