= 2010 Seguros Bolívar Open Medellín – Doubles =

Doubles
- 2010 Seguros Bolívar Open Medellín

Final
- Champions: (Colombia) Juan Sebastián Cabal (Colombia) Robert Farah
- Runners-up: (Brazil) Franco Ferreiro (Brazil) André Sá
- Score: 6–3, 7–5

Events
Singles	Doubles
← 2009 ·	Seguros Bolívar Open Medellín	· 2011 →

Sebastián Decoud and Eduardo Schwank were the defending champions, but Schwank decided not to participate.
Decoud partnered with Diego Junqueira, but withdrew before their first round match due to Decoud's back injury.
Juan Sebastián Cabal and Robert Farah defeated 1st seeds Franco Ferreiro and André Sá 6–3, 7–5 in the final.

== Seeds ==
1. (Brazil) Franco Ferreiro / (Brazil) André Sá (final)
2. (Portugal) Rui Machado / (Spain) Daniel Muñoz-de la Nava (first round)
3. (Argentina) Brian Dabul / (Brazil) Rogério Dutra da Silva (quarterfinals)
4. (Brazil) Marcos Daniel / (Mexico) Santiago González (first round)

== Draw ==
=== Key ===
- Q = Qualifier
- WC = Wild card
- LL = Lucky loser
- Alt = Alternate
- SE = Special exempt
- PR = Protected ranking
- ITF = ITF entry
- JE = Junior exempt
- w/o = Walkover
- r = Retired
- d = Defaulted
- SR = Special ranking

=== Draw ===
First round
1	(Brazil) F Ferreiro (Brazil) A Sá
(France) É Prodon (Kazakhstan) Y Schukin	w/o
(Argentina) S Decoud (Argentina) D Junqueira	w/o
(Italy) A Arnaboldi (Italy) G Naso
3	(Argentina) B Dabul (Brazil) R Dutra da Silva	6	7
WC	(Colombia) JS Gómez (Colombia) C Salamanca	2	5
WC	(Colombia) S López (United States) E Nunez	6	3	[10]
(Portugal) P Sousa (Portugal) L Tavares	3	6	[8]
(Chile) P Capdeville (Chile) N Massú	6	6
(Brazil) T Alves (Brazil) R Hocevar	3	2
(Colombia) JS Cabal (Colombia) R Farah	6	6
4	(Brazil) M Daniel (Mexico) S González	4	1
WC	(Colombia) A González (Colombia) E Struvay	4	3
(Dominican Republic) V Estrella (Brazil) J Souza	6	6
(Argentina) M Alund (Argentina) F Bagnis	6	3	[10]
2	(Portugal) R Machado (Spain) D Muñoz-de la Nava	3	6	[8]

Quarterfinals
1	(Brazil) F Ferreiro (Brazil) A Sá	6	6
(Italy) A Arnaboldi (Italy) G Naso	2	2
3	(Argentina) B Dabul (Brazil) R Dutra da Silva	1	3
WC	(Colombia) S López (United States) E Nunez	6	6
(Chile) P Capdeville (Chile) N Massú	w/o
(Colombia) JS Cabal (Colombia) R Farah
(Dominican Republic) V Estrella (Brazil) J Souza	6	6
(Argentina) M Alund (Argentina) F Bagnis	4	4

Semifinals
1	(Brazil) F Ferreiro (Brazil) A Sá	6	6
WC	(Colombia) S López (United States) E Nunez	4	2
(Colombia) JS Cabal (Colombia) R Farah	7	6
(Dominican Republic) V Estrella (Brazil) J Souza	6^{6}	4

Final
1	(Brazil) F Ferreiro (Brazil) A Sá	3	5
(Colombia) JS Cabal (Colombia) R Farah	6	7
