= 2009 Seguros Bolívar Open Medellín – Doubles =

Doubles
- 2009 Seguros Bolívar Open Medellín

Final
- Champions: (Argentina) Sebastián Decoud (Argentina) Eduardo Schwank
- Runners-up: (Argentina) Diego Junqueira (Spain) David Marrero
- Score: 6–0, 6–2

Events
| Singles | Doubles |
| ← 2008 · | Seguros Bolívar Open Medellín | · 2010 → |

Juan Sebastián Cabal and Alejandro Falla were the defending champions, but they chose to not participate this year.
Sebastián Decoud and Eduardo Schwank defeated 2nd seed Diego Junqueira and David Marrero 6–0, 6–2 in the final.

== Seeds ==
1. (Mexico) Santiago González / (Argentina) Sebastián Prieto (quarterfinals)
2. (Argentina) Diego Junqueira / (Spain) David Marrero (final)
3. (Brazil) Ricardo Hocevar / (Brazil) João Souza (first round)
4. (Dominican Republic) Víctor Estrella / (Colombia) Alejandro González (semifinals)

== Draw ==
=== Key ===
- Q = Qualifier
- WC = Wild card
- LL = Lucky loser
- Alt = Alternate
- SE = Special exempt
- PR = Protected ranking
- ITF = ITF entry
- JE = Junior exempt
- w/o = Walkover
- r = Retired
- d = Defaulted
- SR = Special ranking

=== Draw ===
First round
1 | (Mexico) S González (Argentina) S Prieto | 7 | 7
(Brazil) T Alves (Spain) F Vicente | 5 | 5
(Spain) I Cervantes-Huegun (Spain) P Riba | 7 | 6^{5} | [9]
(Argentina) S Decoud (Argentina) E Schwank | 6^{2} | 7 | [11]
3 | (Brazil) R Hocevar (Brazil) J Souza | 5 | 6^{4}
(Argentina) M Alund (Argentina) F Bagnis | 7 | 7
(Chile) G Hormazábal (Argentina) G Pella | 7
(Chile) P Capdeville (Chile) N Massú | 6^{2} | r
WC | (Argentina) JI Chela (Argentina) M Monachesi | 3 | 6^{3}
(Germany) A Begemann (Germany) L Pörschke | 6 | 7
ALT | (Chile) H Podlipnik (Colombia) S Serrano | 1 | 5
4 | (Dominican Republic) V Estrella (Colombia) A González | 6 | 7
WC | (Venezuela) R Corrente (Venezuela) D Sano | 2 | 0
(Monaco) B Balleret (Portugal) L Tavares | 6 | 6
WC | (Colombia) JS Gómez (Colombia) S López | 3 | 2
2 | (Argentina) D Junqueira (Spain) D Marrero | 6 | 6

Quarterfinals
1 | (Mexico) S González (Argentina) S Prieto | 4 | 4
(Argentina) S Decoud (Argentina) E Schwank | 6 | 6
(Argentina) M Alund (Argentina) F Bagnis | 6 | 6
(Chile) G Hormazábal (Argentina) G Pella | 2 | 0
(Germany) A Begemann (Germany) L Pörschke | 0 | 2
4 | (Dominican Republic) V Estrella (Colombia) A González | 6 | 6
(Monaco) B Balleret (Portugal) L Tavares | 1 | 3
2 | (Argentina) D Junqueira (Spain) D Marrero | 6 | 6

Semifinals
(Argentina) S Decoud (Argentina) E Schwank | 6 | 6
(Argentina) M Alund (Argentina) F Bagnis | 1 | 0
4 | (Dominican Republic) V Estrella (Colombia) A González | 1 | 1
2 | (Argentina) D Junqueira (Spain) D Marrero | 6 | 6

Finals
(Argentina) S Decoud (Argentina) E Schwank | 6 | 6
2 | (Argentina) D Junqueira (Spain) D Marrero | 0 | 2
