= 2016 Claro Open Medellín – Men's singles =

Men's singles
- 2016 Claro Open Medellín

Final
- Champion: (Argentina) Facundo Bagnis
- Runner-up: (Brazil) Caio Zampieri
- Score: 6–7^{(3–7)}, 7–5, 6–2

Events
Singles	men	women
Doubles	men	women
- Claro Open Medellín

Paolo Lorenzi was the defending champion but chose not to defend his title.

Facundo Bagnis won the title after defeating Caio Zampieri 6–7^{(3–7)}, 7–5, 6–2 in the final.

== Seeds ==
1. (Dominican Republic) Víctor Estrella Burgos (first round)
2. (Argentina) Facundo Bagnis (champion)
3. (Brazil) Rogério Dutra Silva (semifinals)
4. (Argentina) Renzo Olivo (second round)
5. (Brazil) João Souza (semifinals)
6. (Colombia) Santiago Giraldo (quarterfinals)
7. (Argentina) Nicolás Kicker (second round)
8. (Colombia) Alejandro González (second round)

== Draw ==
Key

- Q = Qualifier
- WC = Wild card
- LL = Lucky loser
- Alt = Alternate
- ITF = ITF entry
- PR = Protected ranking
- SR = Special ranking
- SE = Special exempt
- JE = Junior exempt
- JR = Junior Accelerator Programme entrant
- CO = College Accelerator Programme entrant
- NG = Next Gen Accelerator Program entrant
- w/o = Walkover
- r = Retired
- d = Defaulted

=== Finals ===
Semifinals
(Brazil) Caio Zampieri	3	7^{10}	6
3	(Brazil) Rogério Dutra Silva	6	6^{8}	2
5	(Brazil) João Souza	7	2	2
2	(Argentina) Facundo Bagnis	5	6	6

Final
(Brazil) Caio Zampieri	7^{7}	5	2
2	(Argentina) Facundo Bagnis	6^{3}	7	6

=== Top half ===
First round
1	(Dominican Republic) V Estrella Burgos	6^{5}	6^{7}
(Colombia) A Falla	7^{7}	7^{9}
(Brazil) A Ghem	6	6
(Chile) Bastián Malla	2	3
(Brazil) C Zampieri	6	6
(Sweden) C Lindell	3	3
Alt	(Colombia) N Barrientos	2	2
8	(Colombia) A González	6	6
3	(Brazil) R Dutra Silva	6	6
LL	(Brazil) B Sant'Anna	4	1
(Argentina) JI Londero	6	6^{9}	5
(Argentina) F Mena	3	7^{11}	7
(Colombia) E Struvay	6	6
Alt	(Brazil) J Pereira	3	4
Q	(Brazil) F Romboli	6	6^{5}	6^{6}
7	(Argentina) N Kicker	3	7^{7}	7^{8}

Second round
(Colombia) A Falla	6	7^{7}
(Brazil) A Ghem	3	6^{3}
(Brazil) C Zampieri	7	6
8	(Colombia) A González	5	4
3	(Brazil) R Dutra Silva	7^{7}	4	6
(Argentina) F Mena	6^{4}	6	2
(Colombia) E Struvay	6	7^{7}
7	(Argentina) N Kicker	4	6^{5}

Quarterfinals
(Colombia) A Falla	6^{3}	7^{7}	2
(Brazil) C Zampieri	7^{7}	6^{2}	6
3	(Brazil) R Dutra Silva	6^{8}	6	6
(Colombia) E Struvay	7^{10}	3	2

Semifinals
(Brazil) C Zampieri	3	7^{10}	6
3	(Brazil) R Dutra Silva	6	6^{8}	2

=== Bottom half ===
First round
5	(Brazil) J Souza	6^{5}	6	6
WC	(Argentina) Gregorio Cordonnier	7^{7}	3	2
WC	(Colombia) DE Galán	4	3
(United States) A El Mihdawy	6	6
(Chile) G Lama	0^{r}
(Dominican Republic) J Hernández	0
Q	(Brazil) O Luz	4	6	3
4	(Argentina) R Olivo	6	4	6
6	(Colombia) S Giraldo	6	6
WC	(Colombia) Felipe Mantilla	1	2
Q	(Brazil) N Santos	4	6	6
WC	(Colombia) Sergio Luis Hernández Ramírez	6	2	1
Q	(Brazil) M Zormann	6	2	6
(Argentina) A Collarini	3	6	4
(Ecuador) G Escobar	6	3	2
2	(Argentina) F Bagnis	3	6	6

Second round
5	(Brazil) J Souza	6	6
(United States) A El Mihdawy	2	3
(Dominican Republic) J Hernández	6	4	6
4	(Argentina) R Olivo	3	6	4
6	(Colombia) S Giraldo	6	6
Q	(Brazil) N Santos	3	3
Q	(Brazil) M Zormann	3	4
2	(Argentina) F Bagnis	6	6

Quarterfinals
5	(Brazil) J Souza	6	7
(Dominican Republic) J Hernández	0	5
6	(Colombia) S Giraldo	3	6	4
2	(Argentina) F Bagnis	6	2	6

Semifinals
5	(Brazil) J Souza	7	2	2
2	(Argentina) F Bagnis	5	6	6
