= 2011 Seguros Bolívar Open Medellín – Singles =

Singles
- 2011 Seguros Bolívar Open Medellín

Final
- Champion: (Dominican Republic) Víctor Estrella
- Runner-up: (Colombia) Alejandro Falla
- Score: 6–7^{(2–7)}, 6–4, 6–4

Events
Singles	Doubles
← 2010 ·	Seguros Bolívar Open Medellín	· 2012 →

Marcos Daniel was the defending champion but decided not to participate.
Víctor Estrella won the final 6–7^{(2–7)}, 6–4, 6–4 against Alejandro Falla.

== Seeds ==
1. (Colombia) Alejandro Falla (final)
2. (France) Éric Prodon (quarterfinals)
3. (Brazil) João Souza (semifinals)
4. (Argentina) Horacio Zeballos (second round)
5. (Chile) Paul Capdeville (semifinals)
6. (Brazil) Rogério Dutra da Silva (first round)
7. (Spain) Pablo Carreño Busta (first round)
8. (Italy) Alessandro Giannessi (first round)

== Draw ==
=== Key ===
- Q = Qualifier
- WC = Wild card
- LL = Lucky loser
- Alt = Alternate
- SE = Special exempt
- PR = Protected ranking
- ITF = ITF entry
- JE = Junior exempt
- w/o = Walkover
- r = Retired
- d = Defaulted
- SR = Special ranking

=== Finals ===
Semifinals
1/WC	(Colombia) Alejandro Falla	7^{7}	6
5	(Chile) Paul Capdeville	6^{3}	2
3	(Brazil) João Souza	4	2
(Dominican Republic) Víctor Estrella	6	6

Final
1/WC	(Colombia) Alejandro Falla	7^{7}	4	4
(Dominican Republic) Víctor Estrella	6^{2}	6	6

=== Top half ===
First round
1/WC	(Colombia) A Falla	6	6
(Italy) G Naso	2	4
(France) Axel Michon	3	7^{7}	6
(Australia) J Duckworth	6	6^{2}	4
(Argentina) F Bagnis	6	6
(Chile) J Aguilar	4	2
(Colombia) C Salamanca	7^{7}	7^{7}
6	(Brazil) R Dutra da Silva	6^{2}	6^{3}
4	(Argentina) H Zeballos	6	6
LL	(Guatemala) C Díaz Figueroa	2	3
WC	(Colombia) Felipe Escobar	1	1
WC	(Chile) N Massú	6	6
(Colombia) A González	7^{7}	3	7^{7}
WC	(Argentina) S Decoud	6^{4}	6	6^{2}
(Italy) A di Mauro	5	6	4
5	(Chile) P Capdeville	7	4	6

Second round
1/WC	(Colombia) A Falla	1	7	7
(France) A Michon	6	5	5
(Argentina) F Bagnis	3	6	6
(Colombia) C Salamanca	6	3	2
4	(Argentina) H Zeballos	6	4	4
WC	(Chile) N Massú	4	6	6
(Colombia) A González	4	1
5	(Chile) P Capdeville	6	6

Quarterfinals
1/WC	(Colombia) A Falla	6	6
(Argentina) F Bagnis	4	2
WC	(Chile) N Massú	4	4
5	(Chile) P Capdeville	6	6

Semifinals
1/WC	(Colombia) A Falla	7^{7}	6
5	(Chile) P Capdeville	6^{3}	2

=== Bottom half ===
First round
8	(Italy) A Giannessi	2	4
(France) G Rufin	6	6
Alt	(Colombia) E Struvay	7	6
Q	(France) L Recouderc	5	4
Q	(Peru) D Beretta	6	4	3
(Argentina) Nicolás Pastor	4	6	6
(France) N Devilder	2	3
3	(Brazil) J Souza	6	6
7	(Spain) P Carreño Busta	4	3
(Dominican Republic) V Estrella	6	6
Q	(United States) D Zivkovic	4	4
(Colombia) J S Cabal	6	6
(Chile) G Rivera Aránguiz	6	6
Q	(Argentina) A Velotti	2	1
(Italy) M Viola	3	3
2	(France) É Prodon	6	6

Second round
(France) G Rufin	4	6	5
Alt	(Colombia) E Struvay	6	1	7
(Argentina) N Pastor	6^{5}	2
3	(Brazil) J Souza	7^{7}	6
(Dominican Republic) V Estrella	6	6
(Colombia) JS Cabal	2	4
(Chile) G Rivera Aránguiz
2	(France) É Prodon	w/o

Quarterfinals
Alt	(Colombia) E Struvay	2	3
3	(Brazil) J Souza	6	6
(Dominican Republic) V Estrella	6	7^{7}
2	(France) É Prodon	3	6^{5}

Semifinals
3	(Brazil) J Souza	4	2
(Dominican Republic) V Estrella	6	6
