= 2014 Seguros Bolívar Open Medellín – Women's doubles =

Women's doubles
- 2014 Seguros Bolívar Open Medellín

Final
- Champions: (Romania) Irina-Camelia Begu (Argentina) María Irigoyen
- Runners-up: (Australia) Monique Adamczak (Russia) Marina Shamayko
- Score: 6–2, 7–6^{(7–2)}

Events
Singles	men	women
Doubles	men	women
← 2013 ·	Seguros Bolívar Open Medellín	· 2015 →

The Seguros Bolívar Open Medellín was a new addition to the ITF Women's Circuit.

Irina-Camelia Begu and María Irigoyen won the inaugural tournament, defeating Monique Adamczak and Marina Shamayko in the final, 6–2, 7–6^{(7–2)}.

== Seeds ==
1. (Romania) Irina-Camelia Begu / (Argentina) María Irigoyen (champions)
2. (Russia) Marina Melnikova / (Georgia (country)) Sofia Shapatava (quarterfinals)
3. (Russia) Irina Khromacheva / (Brazil) Laura Pigossi (quarterfinals)
4. (Germany) Christina Shakovets / (United Kingdom) Nicola Slater (first round)

== Draw ==
=== Key ===
- Q = Qualifier
- WC = Wild card
- LL = Lucky loser
- Alt = Alternate
- SE = Special exempt
- PR = Protected ranking
- ITF = ITF entry
- JE = Junior exempt
- w/o = Walkover
- r = Retired
- d = Defaulted
- SR = Special ranking

First round
1	(Romania) I-C Begu (Argentina) M Irigoyen	6	6^{5}	[10]
(Switzerland) C Perrin (Bosnia and Herzegovina) J Tinjić	4	7^{7}	[3]
(Chile) C Costa Melgar (Chile) D Seguel	6	6
WC	(Colombia) PA Pérez (United States) D Roldan	2	2
4	(Germany) C Shakovets (United Kingdom) N Slater	5	1
(Paraguay) M González (Argentina) C Pella	7	6
(Italy) A Grymalska (Colombia) Y Lizarazo	1	6	[9]
(Colombia) M Duque (Switzerland) R Oprandi	6	4	[11]
(Italy) M Caregaro (Italy) G Sanesi	3	4
(Spain) B García Vidagany (Argentina) F Molinero	6	6
(United States) J Cohen (United States) D Muresan	1	4
3	(Russia) I Khromacheva (Brazil) L Pigossi	6	6
WC	(Colombia) D Carrillo (Colombia) D Monsalve	2	4
(Australia) M Adamczak (Russia) M Shamayko	6	6
WC	(Canada) F Abanda (United States) D Moreno-Kaste	0	5
2	(Russia) M Melnikova (Georgia (country)) S Shapatava	6	7

Quarterfinals
1	(Romania) I-C Begu (Argentina) M Irigoyen	6	6
(Chile) C Costa Melgar (Chile) D Seguel	1	1
(Paraguay) M González (Argentina) C Pella	1^{r}
(Colombia) M Duque (Switzerland) R Oprandi	0
(Spain) B García Vidagany (Argentina) F Molinero	6	6
3	(Russia) I Khromacheva (Brazil) L Pigossi	2	2
(Australia) M Adamczak (Russia) M Shamayko	6	6
2	(Russia) M Melnikova (Georgia (country)) S Shapatava	1	3

Semifinals
1	(Romania) I-C Begu (Argentina) M Irigoyen	6	7
(Colombia) M Duque (Switzerland) R Oprandi	4	5
(Spain) B García Vidagany (Argentina) F Molinero
(Australia) M Adamczak (Russia) M Shamayko	w/o

Final
1	(Romania) I-C Begu (Argentina) M Irigoyen	6	7^{7}
(Australia) M Adamczak (Russia) M Shamayko	2	6^{2}
