= 2015 Seguros Bolívar Open Medellín – Women's doubles =

Women's doubles
- 2015 Seguros Bolívar Open Medellín

Final
- Champions: (Spain) Lourdes Domínguez Lino (Luxembourg) Mandy Minella
- Runners-up: (Colombia) Mariana Duque (Israel) Julia Glushko
- Score: 7–5, 4–6, [10–5]

Events
Singles	men	women
Doubles	men	women
← 2014 ·	Seguros Bolívar Open Medellín	· 2016 →

Irina-Camelia Begu and María Irigoyen were the defending champions, however Begu chose to compete at the 2015 Family Circle Cup instead. Irigoyen partnered up with Paula Ormaechea but lost in the first round to Tadeja Majerič and Conny Perrin.

The second seeds, Lourdes Domínguez Lino and Mandy Minella won the title, defeating Mariana Duque and Julia Glushko in the final, 7–5, 4–6, [10–5].

== Seeds ==
1. (Romania) Elena Bogdan / (United States) Nicole Melichar (quarterfinals)
2. (Spain) Lourdes Domínguez Lino / (Luxembourg) Mandy Minella (champions)
3. (Spain) Beatriz García Vidagany / (Argentina) Florencia Molinero (first round)
4. (United States) Jan Abaza / (United States) Sanaz Marand (semifinals)

== Draw ==
=== Key ===
- Q = Qualifier
- WC = Wild card
- LL = Lucky loser
- Alt = Alternate
- SE = Special exempt
- PR = Protected ranking
- ITF = ITF entry
- JE = Junior exempt
- w/o = Walkover
- r = Retired
- d = Defaulted
- SR = Special ranking

First round
1	(Romania) E Bogdan (United States) N Melichar	6	6
WC	(Colombia) MP Pérez (Colombia) PA Pérez	4	2
(Slovenia) T Majerič (Switzerland) C Perrin	0	6	[10]
(Argentina) M Irigoyen (Argentina) P Ormaechea	6	3	[8]
3	(Spain) B García Vidagany (Argentina) F Molinero	1	3
(Russia) I Khromacheva (Belgium) E Mertens	6	6
(Colombia) Y Lizarazo (Austria) P Mayr-Achleitner	2	5
(Colombia) M Duque (Israel) J Glushko	6	7
(Russia) M Melnikova (Georgia (country)) S Shapatava	6^{5}	6	[7]
(Paraguay) V Cepede Royg (Paraguay) M González	7^{7}	1	[10]
WC	(Colombia) MF Herazo (United States) D Moreno-Kaste	3	1
4	(United States) J Abaza (United States) S Marand	6	6
(Brazil) PC Gonçalves (Brazil) T Pereira	6	6
(Netherlands) C Burger (Mexico) M Zacarías	2	2
(Slovenia) N Kolar (Romania) PM Țig	2	3
2	(Spain) L Domínguez Lino (Luxembourg) M Minella	6	6

Quarterfinals
1	(Romania) E Bogdan (United States) N Melichar	6	3	[4]
(Slovenia) T Majerič (Switzerland) C Perrin	4	6	[10]
(Russia) I Khromacheva (Belgium) E Mertens	2	2
(Colombia) M Duque (Israel) J Glushko	6	6
(Paraguay) V Cepede Royg (Paraguay) M González	1	7^{7}	[7]
4	(United States) J Abaza (United States) S Marand	6	6^{4}	[10]
(Brazil) PC Gonçalves (Brazil) T Pereira	4	6^{5}
2	(Spain) L Domínguez Lino (Luxembourg) M Minella	6	7^{7}

Semifinals
(Slovenia) T Majerič (Switzerland) C Perrin	6^{4}	6	[5]
(Colombia) M Duque (Israel) J Glushko	7^{7}	3	[10]
4	(United States) J Abaza (United States) S Marand	2	1
2	(Spain) L Domínguez Lino (Luxembourg) M Minella	6	6

Final
(Colombia) M Duque (Israel) J Glushko	5	6	[5]
2	(Spain) L Domínguez Lino (Luxembourg) M Minella	7	4	[10]
