= 2011 Seguros Bolívar Open Medellín =

- Date: 31 October – 6 November
- Edition: 8th
- Location: Medellín, Colombia

Champions

Singles
- (Dominican Republic) Víctor Estrella

Doubles
- (Chile) Paul Capdeville / (Chile) Nicolás Massú
← 2010 ·	Seguros Bolívar Open Medellín	· 2012 →

The 2011 Seguros Bolívar Open Medellín was a professional tennis tournament played on clay courts. It was the eighth edition of the tournament, which is part of the 2011 ATP Challenger Tour. It took place in Medellín, Colombia between 31 October and 6 November 2011.

== Singles main draw entrants ==
=== Seeds ===
Country	Player	Rank^{1}	Seed
COL	Alejandro Falla	83	1
FRA	Éric Prodon	87	2
BRA	João Souza	105	3
ARG	Horacio Zeballos	111	4
CHI	Paul Capdeville	113	5
BRA	Rogério Dutra da Silva	118	6
ESP	Pablo Carreño Busta	138	7
ITA	Alessandro Giannessi	143	8

- ^{1} Rankings are as of October 24, 2011.

=== Other entrants ===
The following players received wildcards into the singles main draw:

- (Argentina) Sebastián Decoud
- (Colombia) Felipe Escobar
- (Colombia) Alejandro Falla
- (Chile) Nicolás Massú

The following players received entry as an alternate into the singles main draw:

- (Colombia) Eduardo Struvay

The following players received entry from the qualifying draw:

- (Peru) Duilio Beretta
- (France) Laurent Recouderc
- (Argentina) Agustín Velotti
- (United States) Dennis Zivkovic

== Champions ==
=== Singles ===
(Dominican Republic) Víctor Estrella def. (Colombia) Alejandro Falla, 6–7^{(2–7)}, 6–4, 6–4

=== Doubles ===
(Chile) Paul Capdeville / (Chile) Nicolás Massú def. (Italy) Alessio di Mauro / (Italy) Matteo Viola, 6–2, 4–6, [10–8]
