= 2017 Claro Open Medellín =

Tennis tournament in Medellín, Colombia

- Date: 11 – 16 July
- Edition: 14th
- Category: ATP Challenger Tour
- Surface: Clay (Outdoor)
- Location: Medellín, Colombia

Champions

Singles
- (Chile) Nicolás Jarry

Doubles
- (Barbados) Darian King / (Mexico) Miguel Ángel Reyes-Varela
← 2016 ·	Claro Open Medellín	· 2018 →

The 2017 Claro Open Medellín was a professional tennis tournament played on outdoor clay courts. It was the 14th edition of the tournament, which was part of the 2017 ATP Challenger Tour. It took place in Medellín, Colombia, between 11 and 16 July 2017.

== Singles main draw entrants ==
=== Seeds ===
Country	Player	Rank^{1}	Seed
DOM	Víctor Estrella Burgos	96	1
BAR	Darian King	119	2
BRA	João Souza	150	3
CHI	Nicolás Jarry	182	4
ESA	Marcelo Arévalo	234	5
ECU	Roberto Quiroz	239	6
DOM	José Hernández-Fernández	247	7
~~FRA~~	~~Maxime Hamou~~	~~272~~	~~8~~

- ^{1} Rankings as of 3 July 2017.

=== Other entrants ===
The following players received wild cards into the singles main draw:

- (Ecuador) Gabriel Carvajal
- (United States) Charles Force
- (Colombia) Sergio Luis Hernández Ramírez
- (Colombia) Carlos Salamanca

The following players received entry from the qualifying draw:

- (Guatemala) Christopher Díaz Figueroa
- (Argentina) Franco Emanuel Egea
- (Dominican Republic) José Olivares
- (Venezuela) David Souto

The following players received entry into the singles main draw as lucky losers:

- (Bolivia) Alejandro Mendoza
- (Chile) Michel Vernier

== Champions ==
=== Singles ===
- (Chile) Nicolás Jarry def. (Brazil) João Souza 6–1, 3–6, 7–6^{(7–0)}.

=== Doubles ===
- (Barbados) Darian King / (Mexico) Miguel Ángel Reyes-Varela def. (Chile) Nicolás Jarry / (Ecuador) Roberto Quiroz 6–4, 6–4.
