= 2015 Seguros Bolívar Open Medellín – Women's singles =

Women's singles
- 2015 Seguros Bolívar Open Medellín

Final
- Champion: (Brazil) Teliana Pereira
- Runner-up: (Paraguay) Verónica Cepede Royg
- Score: 7–6^{(8–6)}, 6–1

Events
Singles	men	women
Doubles	men	women
← 2014 ·	Seguros Bolívar Open Medellín	· 2016 →

Verónica Cepede Royg was the defending champion, but lost in the final to Teliana Pereira, 7–6^{(8–6)}, 6–1.

== Seeds ==
1. (Spain) Lourdes Domínguez Lino (quarterfinals)
2. (Colombia) Mariana Duque (semifinals)
3. (Israel) Julia Glushko (second round)
4. (Austria) Patricia Mayr-Achleitner (quarterfinals)
5. (Argentina) Paula Ormaechea (first round)
6. (Brazil) Teliana Pereira (champion)
7. (Germany) Dinah Pfizenmaier (first round)
8. (Paraguay) Verónica Cepede Royg (final)

== Main draw ==
=== Key ===
- Q = Qualifier
- WC = Wild card
- LL = Lucky loser
- Alt = Alternate
- SE = Special exempt
- PR = Protected ranking
- ITF = ITF entry
- JE = Junior exempt
- w/o = Walkover
- r = Retired
- d = Defaulted
- SR = Special ranking

=== Finals ===
Semifinals
8	(Paraguay) Verónica Cepede Royg	6	0	6
(Croatia) Tereza Mrdeža	1	6	3
6	(Brazil) Teliana Pereira	6	6
2	(Colombia) Mariana Duque	3	3

Final
8	(Paraguay) Verónica Cepede Royg	6^{6}	1
6	(Brazil) Teliana Pereira	7^{8}	6

=== Top half ===
First round
1	(Spain) L Domínguez Lino	6	6
(Paraguay) M González	3	3
(Slovenia) T Majerič	1	1
(Luxembourg) M Minella	6	6
Q	(Italy) M Caregaro	4	3
Q	(United States) L Embree	6	6
(Argentina) F Molinero	6	5	2
8	(Paraguay) V Cepede Royg	2	7	6
3	(Israel) J Glushko	7	7^{7}
(Spain) B García Vidagany	5	6^{3}
WC	(Colombia) Y Monroy	3	1
(Croatia) T Mrdeža	6	6
(Belgium) E Mertens	6	6
WC	(Colombia) MF Herazo	1	3
(Russia) I Khromacheva	7	6
5	(Argentina) P Ormaechea	5	3

Second round
1	(Spain) L Domínguez Lino	7	6
(Luxembourg) M Minella	5	3
Q	(United States) L Embree	3	0^{r}
8	(Paraguay) V Cepede Royg	6	3
3	(Israel) J Glushko	6	5	3
(Croatia) T Mrdeža	4	7	6
(Belgium) E Mertens	3	1
(Russia) I Khromacheva	6	6

Quarterfinals
1	(Spain) L Domínguez Lino	6^{6}	1
8	(Paraguay) V Cepede Royg	7^{8}	6
(Croatia) T Mrdeža	4	6	7^{7}
(Russia) I Khromacheva	6	4	6^{2}

Semifinals
8	(Paraguay) V Cepede Royg	6	0	6
(Croatia) T Mrdeža	1	6	3

=== Bottom half ===
First round
6	(Brazil) T Pereira	7	6
(United States) S Marand	5	1
Q	(United States) K Stewart	6	6
(Georgia (country)) S Shapatava	1	0
Q	(Italy) G Sanesi	6	3	0^{r}
(Slovenia) N Kolar	3	6	4
WC	(Colombia) Y Lizarazo	3	2
4	(Austria) P Mayr-Achleitner	6	6
7	(Germany) D Pfizenmaier	6^{3}	6^{10}
(Romania) PM Țig	7^{7}	7^{12}
(Spain) L Pous Tió	7^{8}	1	6
(Argentina) M Irigoyen	6^{6}	6	4
(Russia) M Melnikova	6	6
WC	(Colombia) MP Pérez	2	0
(Netherlands) C Burger	6	5	3
2	(Colombia) M Duque	4	7	6

Second round
6	(Brazil) T Pereira	6	6
Q	(United States) K Stewart	2	3
(Slovenia) N Kolar	3	6	6^{5}
4	(Austria) P Mayr-Achleitner	6	2	7^{7}
(Romania) PM Țig	7	6
(Spain) L Pous Tió	5	4
(Russia) M Melnikova	4	4
2	(Colombia) M Duque	6	6

Quarterfinals
6	(Brazil) T Pereira	6	7
4	(Austria) P Mayr-Achleitner	1	5
(Romania) PM Țig	6^{4}	2
2	(Colombia) M Duque	7^{7}	6

Semifinals
6	(Brazil) T Pereira	6	6
2	(Colombia) M Duque	3	3
