= 2014 Seguros Bolívar Open Medellín – Women's singles =

Women's singles
- 2014 Seguros Bolívar Open Medellín

Final
- Champion: (Paraguay) Verónica Cepede Royg
- Runner-up: (Romania) Irina-Camelia Begu
- Score: 6–4, 4–6, 6–4

Events
Singles	men	women
Doubles	men	women
← 2013 ·	Seguros Bolívar Open Medellín	· 2015 →

The Seguros Bolívar Open Medellín was a new addition to the ITF Women's Circuit.

Verónica Cepede Royg won the inaugural tournament, defeating Irina-Camelia Begu in the final, 6–4, 4–6, 6–4.

== Seeds ==
1. (Colombia) Mariana Duque (first round)
2. (Switzerland) Romina Oprandi (quarterfinals)
3. (Romania) Irina-Camelia Begu (final)
4. (Paraguay) Verónica Cepede Royg (champion)
5. (Argentina) María Irigoyen (semifinals)
6. (Spain) Lara Arruabarrena (quarterfinals)
7. (Argentina) Florencia Molinero (quarterfinals)
8. (United States) Julia Cohen (first round)

== Main draw ==
=== Key ===
- Q = Qualifier
- WC = Wild card
- LL = Lucky loser
- Alt = Alternate
- SE = Special exempt
- PR = Protected ranking
- ITF = ITF entry
- JE = Junior exempt
- w/o = Walkover
- r = Retired
- d = Defaulted
- SR = Special ranking

=== Finals ===
Semifinals
JE	(Russia) Varvara Flink	6^{2}	5
4	(Paraguay) Verónica Cepede Royg	7^{7}	7
3	(Romania) Irina-Camelia Begu	6	6
5	(Argentina) María Irigoyen	1	1

Final
4	(Paraguay) Verónica Cepede Royg	6	4	6
3	(Romania) Irina-Camelia Begu	4	6	4

=== Top half ===
First round
1	(Colombia) M Duque	4	5
Q	(Italy) G Sanesi	6	7
(Chile) C Costa Melgar	4	7^{7}	6
(Australia) M Adamczak	6	6^{4}	1
(Brazil) L Pigossi	6	6
WC	(Colombia) Y Monroy	3	3
JE	(Russia) V Flink	7^{7}	6
8	(United States) J Cohen	6^{3}	0
4	(Paraguay) V Cepede Royg	6	6
(Paraguay) M González	1	4
Q	(Italy) M Caregaro	6	6
(Switzerland) C Perrin	4	1
(Georgia (country)) S Shapatava	2	7^{7}	7
(Canada) F Abanda	6	6^{4}	5
WC	(Netherlands) AK Alzate Esmurzaeva	2	0
6	(Spain) L Arruabarrena	6	6

Second round
Q	(Italy) G Sanesi	6	6
(Chile) C Costa Melgar	4	3
(Brazil) L Pigossi	4	2
JE	(Russia) V Flink	6	6
4	(Paraguay) V Cepede Royg	6	6
Q	(Italy) M Caregaro	1	4
(Georgia (country)) S Shapatava	4	6	3
6	(Spain) L Arruabarrena	6	4	6

Quarterfinals
Q	(Italy) G Sanesi	1	3
JE	(Russia) V Flink	6	6
4	(Paraguay) V Cepede Royg	6	1	6
6	(Spain) L Arruabarrena	3	6	4

Semifinals
JE	(Russia) V Flink	6^{2}	5
4	(Paraguay) V Cepede Royg	7^{7}	7

=== Bottom half ===
First round
7	(Argentina) F Molinero	6	6
Q	(Russia) M Marfutina	4	4
(Spain) B García Vidagany	6	6
(Russia) M Shamayko	3	4
Q	(United States) D Muresan	3	6^{1}
(Spain) L Pous Tió	6	7^{7}
(Bosnia and Herzegovina) J Tinjić	0	0
3	(Romania) I-C Begu	6	6
5	(Argentina) M Irigoyen	6	6
(Italy) A Grymalska	2	1
WC	(Colombia) Y Lizarazo	1	6^{1}
(Chile) D Seguel	6	7^{7}
(Russia) I Khromacheva	6	6^{5}	4
(Russia) M Melnikova	1	7^{7}	6
(Argentina) C Pella	2	2
2	(Switzerland) R Oprandi	6	6

Second round
7	(Argentina) F Molinero	6	6
(Spain) B García Vidagany	4	3
(Spain) L Pous Tió	7^{7}	5	0
3	(Romania) I-C Begu	6^{1}	7	6
5	(Argentina) M Irigoyen	6	5	6
(Chile) D Seguel	1	7	4
(Russia) M Melnikova	5	3
2	(Switzerland) R Oprandi	7	6

Quarterfinals
7	(Argentina) F Molinero	3	1
3	(Romania) I-C Begu	6	6
5	(Argentina) M Irigoyen	7	3	6
2	(Switzerland) R Oprandi	5	6	3

Semifinals
3	(Romania) I-C Begu	6	6
5	(Argentina) M Irigoyen	1	1
