= 2015 Seguros Bolívar Open Medellín – Men's doubles =

Men's doubles
- 2015 Seguros Bolívar Open Medellín

Final
- Champions: (Colombia) Nicolás Barrientos (Colombia) Eduardo Struvay
- Runners-up: (Colombia) Alejandro Gómez (Colombia) Felipe Mantilla
- Score: 7–6^{(8–6)}, 6–7^{(4–7)}, [10–4]

Events
Singles	men	women
Doubles	men	women
- Seguros Bolívar Open Medellín

Austin Krajicek and César Ramírez are the defending champions, but only Ramírez defended his title partnering Miguel Ángel Reyes-Varela, but lost in the semifinals to Nicolás Barrientos and Eduardo Struvay.

Barrientos and Struvay won the title defeating Alejandro Gómez and Felipe Mantilla in the final, 7–6^{(8–6)}, 6–7^{(4–7)}, [10–4].

== Seeds ==
1. (Mexico) César Ramírez / (Mexico) Miguel Ángel Reyes-Varela (semifinals)
2. (Italy) Paolo Lorenzi / (Brazil) João Souza (first round)
3. (Colombia) Nicolás Barrientos / (Colombia) Eduardo Struvay (champions)
4. (Argentina) Andrés Molteni / (Brazil) Fernando Romboli (first round)

== Draw ==
Key

- Q = Qualifier
- WC = Wild card
- LL = Lucky loser
- Alt = Alternate
- ITF = ITF entry
- PR = Protected ranking
- SR = Special ranking
- SE = Special exempt
- JE = Junior exempt
- JR = Junior Accelerator Programme entrant
- CO = College Accelerator Programme entrant
- NG = Next Gen Accelerator Program entrant
- w/o = Walkover
- r = Retired
- d = Defaulted

First round
1	(Mexico) C Ramírez (Mexico) MA Reyes-Varela	7^{7}	7^{7}
(Brazil) G Clezar (Brazil) F Neis	6^{4}	6^{2}
WC	(Colombia) Juan Manuel Benitez (Colombia) Felipe Escobar	6	4	[10]
(Argentina) F Coria (Chile) G Lama	3	6	[8]
3	(Colombia) N Barrientos (Colombia) E Struvay	6	7
(Argentina) JI Londero (Argentina) F Mena	4	5
(Venezuela) LD Martínez (United Kingdom) D Walsh	6	5	[10]
(Ecuador) G Escobar (Ecuador) E Gómez	3	7	[8]
(Belgium) Y Reuter (Spain) J Samper-Montaña	6	6
WC	(United States) Sam Barnett (United States) K Kim	1	2
(El Salvador) M Arévalo (Colombia) JS Gómez	6	6
4	(Argentina) A Molteni (Brazil) F Romboli	3	4
(Colombia) A Falla (Ecuador) G Lapentti	6	6
(United States) A El Mihdawy (Ecuador) I Endara	3	1
WC	(Colombia) A Gómez (Colombia) Felipe Mantilla	7^{7}	6
2	(Italy) P Lorenzi (Brazil) J Souza	6^{4}	4

Quarterfinals
1	(Mexico) C Ramírez (Mexico) MA Reyes-Varela	6	7^{7}
WC	(Colombia) JM Benitez (Colombia) F Escobar	2	6^{5}
3	(Colombia) N Barrientos (Colombia) E Struvay	3	6	[10]
(Venezuela) LD Martínez (United Kingdom) D Walsh	6	3	[6]
(Belgium) Y Reuter (Spain) J Samper-Montaña	3	6	[10]
(El Salvador) M Arévalo (Colombia) JS Gómez	6	3	[6]
(Colombia) A Falla (Ecuador) G Lapentti
WC	(Colombia) A Gómez (Colombia) F Mantilla	w/o

Semifinals
1	(Mexico) C Ramírez (Mexico) MA Reyes-Varela	5	3
3	(Colombia) N Barrientos (Colombia) E Struvay	7	6
(Belgium) Y Reuter (Spain) J Samper-Montaña	0	5
WC	(Colombia) A Gómez (Colombia) F Mantilla	6	7

Final
3	(Colombia) N Barrientos (Colombia) E Struvay	7^{8}	6^{4}	[10]
(Colombia) A Gómez (Colombia) F Mantilla	6^{6}	7^{7}	[4]
