= 2014 Seguros Bolívar Open Medellín =

- Date: 31 March – 6 April; 1 September – 7 September
- Edition: 11th (ATP) / 1st (ITF)
- Category: ATP Challenger Tour; ITF Women's Circuit
- Prize money: $50,000+H
- Surface: Clay
- Location: Medellín, Colombia

Champions

Men's singles
- (United States) Austin Krajicek

Women's singles
- (Paraguay) Verónica Cepede Royg

Men's doubles
- (United States) Austin Krajicek / (Mexico) César Ramírez

Women's doubles
- (Romania) Irina-Camelia Begu / (Argentina) María Irigoyen
← 2013 ·	Seguros Bolívar Open Medellín	· 2015 →

The 2014 Seguros Bolívar Open Medellín was a professional tennis tournament played on outdoor clay courts. It was the first edition of the tournament and part of the 2014 ITF Women's Circuit, offering a total of $50,000+H in prize money. It took place in Medellín, Colombia, on 31 March – 6 April 2014.

== ATP singles main draw entrants ==
=== Seeds ===
Country	Player	Rank^{1}	Seed
COL	Alejandro González	100	1
ARG	Facundo Bagnis	109	2
BRA	João Souza	113	3
ARG	Guido Pella	155	4
USA	Wayne Odesnik	176	5
BRA	Guilherme Clezar	190	6
CHI	Gonzalo Lama	198	7
USA	Austin Krajicek	202	8

- ^{1} Rankings are as of July 15, 2013.

=== Other entrants ===
The following players received wildcards into the singles main draw:

- (United States) David Konstantinov
- (Colombia) Carlos Salamanca
- (Colombia) Juan-Carlos Spir
- (Colombia) Michael Quintero

The following players received entry from the qualifying draw:

- (Brazil) Bruno Sant'anna
- (Brazil) Fabiano de Paula
- (El Salvador) Marcelo Arévalo
- (United States) Dennis Novikov

== WTA singles main draw entrants ==
=== Seeds ===
Country	Player	Rank^{1}	Seed
COL	Mariana Duque	107	1
SUI	Romina Oprandi	114	2
ROU	Irina-Camelia Begu	129	3
PAR	Verónica Cepede Royg	157	4
ARG	María Irigoyen	161	5
ESP	Lara Arruabarrena	186	6
ARG	Florencia Molinero	194	7
USA	Julia Cohen	200	8

- ^{1} Rankings as of 17 March 2014

=== Other entrants ===
The following players received wildcards into the singles main draw:

- (Netherlands) Anna Katalina Alzate Esmurzaeva
- (Colombia) Yuliana Lizarazo
- (Colombia) Yuliana Monroy

The following players received entry from the qualifying draw:

- (Italy) Martina Caregaro
- (Russia) Maria Marfutina
- (United States) Denise Muresan
- (Italy) Gaia Sanesi

The following player received entry by a junior exempt:

- (Russia) Varvara Flink

== Champions ==
=== Men's singles ===
- (United States) Austin Krajicek def. (Brazil) João Souza 7–5, 6–3

=== Women's singles ===
- (Paraguay) Verónica Cepede Royg def. (Romania) Irina-Camelia Begu 6–4, 4–6, 6–4

=== Men's doubles ===
- (United States) Austin Krajicek / (Mexico) César Ramírez def. (Venezuela) Roberto Maytín / (Argentina) Andrés Molteni 6–3, 7–5

=== Women's doubles ===
- (Romania) Irina-Camelia Begu / (Argentina) María Irigoyen def. (Australia) Monique Adamczak / (Russia) Marina Shamayko 6–2, 7–6^{(7–2)}
