= 2015 Seguros Bolívar Open Medellín – Men's singles =

Men's singles
- 2015 Seguros Bolívar Open Medellín

Final
- Champion: (Italy) Paolo Lorenzi
- Runner-up: (Chile) Gonzalo Lama
- Score: 7–6^{(7–3)}, 2–0 ret.

Events
Singles	men	women
Doubles	men	women
- Seguros Bolívar Open Medellín

Austin Krajicek was the defending champion, but chose to compete in the Japan Open instead of defending his title.

Paolo Lorenzi won the title defeating Gonzalo Lama in the final, 7–6^{(7–3)}, 2–0 retired.

== Seeds ==
1. (Italy) Paolo Lorenzi (champion)
2. (Colombia) Alejandro González (quarterfinals)
3. (Colombia) Alejandro Falla (first round, retired)
4. (Brazil) João Souza (first round)
5. (Brazil) Guilherme Clezar (quarterfinals)
6. (Spain) Jordi Samper-Montaña (semifinals)
7. (Ecuador) Giovanni Lapentti (semifinals)
8. (Colombia) Nicolás Barrientos (first round)

== Draw ==
Key

- Q = Qualifier
- WC = Wild card
- LL = Lucky loser
- Alt = Alternate
- ITF = ITF entry
- PR = Protected ranking
- SR = Special ranking
- SE = Special exempt
- JE = Junior exempt
- JR = Junior Accelerator Programme entrant
- CO = College Accelerator Programme entrant
- NG = Next Gen Accelerator Program entrant
- w/o = Walkover
- r = Retired
- d = Defaulted

=== Finals ===
Semifinals
1	(Italy) Paolo Lorenzi	7^{7}	6
7	(Ecuador) Giovanni Lapentti	6^{2}	1
6	(Spain) Jordi Samper-Montaña	6^{6}	6^{5}
(Chile) Gonzalo Lama	7^{8}	7^{7}

Final
1	(Italy) Paolo Lorenzi	7^{7}	2
(Chile) Gonzalo Lama	6^{3}	0^{r}

=== Top half ===
First round
1	(Italy) P Lorenzi	6	6
(Brazil) F Romboli	3	2
LL	(Argentina) Juan Ignacio Galarza	7^{7}	3	6
(Ecuador) G Escobar	6^{4}	6	2
WC	(Colombia) Felipe Mantilla	3	6	6
WC	(Colombia) DE Galán	6	4	2
(Belgium) Y Reuter	2	7	1
5	(Brazil) G Clezar	6	5	6
3	(Colombia) A Falla	1^{r}
(Colombia) E Struvay	2
Q	(Guatemala) C Díaz Figueroa	6^{2}	7	4
Q	(United States) P Kobelt	7^{7}	5	6
(Ecuador) I Endara	4	1
(Argentina) F Mena	6	6
(Italy) G Quinzi	2	2
7	(Ecuador) G Lapentti	6	6

Second round
1	(Italy) P Lorenzi	3	6	6
LL	(Argentina) JI Galarza	6	4	4
WC	(Colombia) F Mantilla	6^{6}	3
5	(Brazil) G Clezar	7^{8}	6
(Colombia) E Struvay	6	6
Q	(United States) P Kobelt	3	2
(Argentina) F Mena	3	6	3
7	(Ecuador) G Lapentti	6	2	6

Quarterfinals
1	(Italy) P Lorenzi	7^{7}	6
5	(Brazil) G Clezar	6^{3}	4
(Colombia) E Struvay	1	6^{2}
7	(Ecuador) G Lapentti	6	7^{7}

Semifinals
1	(Italy) P Lorenzi	7^{7}	6
7	(Ecuador) G Lapentti	6^{2}	1

=== Bottom half ===
First round
6	(Spain) J Samper-Montaña	6	6
WC	(Colombia) JS Gómez	3	4
(United States) D Baughman	6	6
(United States) A El Mihdawy	3	3
WC	(Colombia) Felipe Escobar	3	6^{5}
(Ecuador) E Gómez	6	7^{7}
(Argentina) JI Londero	6	6
4	(Brazil) J Souza	2	3
8	(Colombia) N Barrientos	4	6	3
(Chile) G Lama	6	3	6
Q	(Peru) JP Varillas	7^{9}	6
Q	(Brazil) F Neis	6^{7}	4
SE	(El Salvador) M Arévalo	2	5
(Italy) R Marcora	6	7
(Argentina) A Molteni	1	3
2	(Colombia) A González	6	6

Second round
6	(Spain) J Samper-Montaña	5	6	6
(United States) D Baughman	7	4	4
(Ecuador) E Gómez	7^{11}	3	4
(Argentina) JI Londero	6^{9}	6	6
(Chile) G Lama	7	6
Q	(Peru) JP Varillas	5	2
(Italy) R Marcora	3	3
2	(Colombia) A González	6	6

Quarterfinals
6	(Spain) J Samper-Montaña	7^{8}	6^{7}	6
(Argentina) JI Londero	6^{6}	7^{9}	3
(Chile) G Lama	6	6
2	(Colombia) A González	4	4

Semifinals
6	(Spain) J Samper-Montaña	6^{6}	6^{5}
(Chile) G Lama	7^{8}	7^{7}
