= 2012 Seguros Bolívar Open Medellín =

- Date: 29 October – 4 November
- Edition: 9th
- Surface: Clay
- Location: Medellín, Colombia

Champions

Singles
- (Italy) Paolo Lorenzi

Doubles
- (United States) Nicholas Monroe / (Germany) Simon Stadler
← 2011 ·	Seguros Bolívar Open Medellín	· 2013 →

The 2012 Seguros Bolívar Open Medellín was a professional tennis tournament played on clay courts. It was the ninth edition of the tournament and was part of the 2012 ATP Challenger Tour. It took place in Medellín, Colombia, from October 29 to November 4, 2012.

== Singles main draw entrants ==
=== Seeds ===
Country	Player	Rank^{1}	Seed
ARG	Leonardo Mayer	72	1
ITA	Paolo Lorenzi	75	2
ESP	Rubén Ramírez Hidalgo	98	3
ARG	Martín Alund	123	4
BRA	João Souza	133	5
POR	Frederico Gil	137	6
USA	Wayne Odesnik	139	7
CHI	Jorge Aguilar	223	8

- ^{1} Rankings are as of October 22, 2012.

=== Other entrants ===
The following players received wildcards into the singles main draw:

- (Colombia) Juan Sebastián Cabal
- (Colombia) Felipe Escobar
- (United States) Kevin Kim
- (Colombia) Michael Quintero

The following players received entry from the qualifying draw:

- (Philippines) Ruben Gonzales
- (Australia) Chris Letcher
- (Argentina) Martin Rios-Benitez
- (Colombia) Steffen Zornosa

== Champions ==
=== Singles ===
- (Italy) Paolo Lorenzi def. (Argentina) Leonardo Mayer, 7–6^{(7–5)}, 6–7^{(4–7)}, 6–4

=== Doubles ===
- (United States) Nicholas Monroe / (Germany) Simon Stadler def. (Argentina) Renzo Olivo / (Argentina) Marco Trungelliti, 6–4, 6–4
