= 2016 Claro Open Medellín =

Tennis tournament in Medellín, Colombia

- Date: 26 September – 1 October
- Edition: 13th
- Category: ATP Challenger Tour
- Prize money: $50,000+H
- Surface: Clay (Outdoor)
- Location: Medellín, Colombia

Champions

Men's singles
- (Argentina) Facundo Bagnis

Men's doubles
- (Colombia) Alejandro Falla / (Colombia) Eduardo Struvay
← 2015 ·	Claro Open Medellín	· 2017 →

The 2016 Claro Open Medellín was a professional tennis tournament played on outdoor clay courts. It is the 13th edition of the tournament. It was part of the 2016 ATP Challenger Tour. It took place in Medellín, Colombia, between 26 September and 1 October 2016.

== Singles main draw entrants ==
=== Seeds ===
Country	Player	Rank^{1}	Seed
DOM	Víctor Estrella Burgos	76	1
ARG	Facundo Bagnis	86	2
BRA	Rogério Dutra Silva	107	3
ARG	Renzo Olivo	120	4
BRA	João Souza	123	5
COL	Santiago Giraldo	129	6
ARG	Nicolás Kicker	136	7
COL	Alejandro González	168	8

- ^{1} Rankings as of 19 September 2016.

=== Other entrants ===
The following players received wild cards into the singles main draw:

- (Argentina) Gregorio Cordonnier
- (Colombia) Juan Sebastián Gómez
- (Colombia) Daniel Elahi Galán
- (Colombia) Sergio Luis Hernández Ramírez

The following players received entry as alternates:

- (Colombia) Nicolás Barrientos
- (Brazil) José Pereira

The following players received entry from the qualifying draw:

- (Brazil) Orlando Luz
- (Brazil) Fernando Romboli
- (Brazil) Nicolas Santos
- (Brazil) Marcelo Zormann

The following player received entry as a lucky loser:

- (Brazil) Bruno Sant'anna

== Champions ==
=== Men's singles ===
- (Argentina) Facundo Bagnis def. (Brazil) Caio Zampieri 6–7^{(3–7)}, 7–5, 6–2.

=== Men's doubles ===
- (Colombia) Alejandro Falla / (Colombia) Eduardo Struvay def. (Brazil) André Ghem / (Spain) Juan Lizariturry 6–3, 6–2.
