= 2009 Seguros Bolívar Open Medellín =

- Date: 2–8 November
- Edition: 6th
- Location: Medellín, Colombia

Champions

Singles
- (Argentina) Juan Ignacio Chela

Doubles
- (Argentina) Sebastián Decoud / (Argentina) Eduardo Schwank
- Seguros Bolívar Open Medellín

The 2009 Seguros Bolívar Open Medellín was a professional tennis tournament played on outdoor red clay courts. It was the sixth edition of the tournament which was part of the 2009 ATP Challenger Tour. It took place in Medellín, Colombia between 2 and 8 November 2009.

== ATP entrants ==
=== Seeds ===
Country	Player	Rank^{1}	Seed
ARG	Juan Ignacio Chela	92	1
CHI	Paul Capdeville	99	2
COL	Santiago Giraldo	109	3
POR	Rui Machado	122	4
CHI	Nicolás Massú	127	5
ESP	Pere Riba	136	6
BRA	Thiago Alves	146	7
ARG	Sergio Roitman	147	8

- Rankings are as of October 26, 2009.

=== Other entrants ===
The following players received wildcards into the singles main draw:

- (Venezuela) Ricardo Corrente
- (Colombia) Alejandro González
- (Serbia) Filip Krajinović
- (Colombia) Eduardo Struvay

The following players received entry from the qualifying draw:

- (Germany) Andre Begemann
- (Romania) Marius Copil
- (Chile) Guillermo Hormazábal
- (Germany) Lars Pörschke

== Champions ==
=== Singles ===
(Argentina) Juan Ignacio Chela def. (Brazil) João Souza, 6–4, 4–6, 6–4

=== Doubles ===
(Argentina) Sebastián Decoud / (Argentina) Eduardo Schwank def. (Argentina) Diego Junqueira / (Spain) David Marrero, 6–0, 6–2
