= 2015 Seguros Bolívar Open Medellín =

- Date: 5 October – 11 October; 6 April – 12 April
- Edition: 12th (ATP) / 2nd (ITF)
- Category: ATP Challenger Tour; ITF Women's Circuit
- Prize money: $50,000+H
- Surface: Clay (Outdoor)
- Location: Medellín, Colombia

Champions

Men's singles
- (Italy) Paolo Lorenzi

Women's singles
- (Brazil) Teliana Pereira

Men's doubles
- (Colombia) Nicolás Barrientos / (Colombia) Eduardo Struvay

Women's doubles
- (Spain) Lourdes Domínguez Lino / (Luxembourg) Mandy Minella
← 2014 ·	Seguros Bolívar Open Medellín	· 2016 →

The 2015 Seguros Bolívar Open Medellín was a professional tennis tournament played on outdoor clay courts. It is the second edition of the tournament for women and twelfth edition for men. It was part of the 2015 ATP Challenger Tour and the 2015 ITF Women's Circuit, offering a total prize money of $50,000+H for both men and for women. It took place in Medellín, Colombia, on 6–12 April 2015 for women and 5–11 October 2015 for men.

== Men's singles main draw entrants ==
=== Seeds ===
Country	Player	Rank^{1}	Seed
ITA	Paolo Lorenzi	86	1
COL	Alejandro González	122	2
COL	Alejandro Falla	123	3
BRA	João Souza	126	4
BRA	Guilherme Clezar	177	5
ESP	Jordi Samper-Montaña	208	6
ECU	Giovanni Lapentti	244	7
COL	Nicolás Barrientos	256	8

- ^{1} Rankings as of 28 September 2015.

=== Other entrants ===
The following players received wildcards into the singles main draw:

- (Colombia) Felipe Escobar
- (Colombia) Daniel Elahi Galán
- (Colombia) Juan Sebastián Gómez
- (Colombia) Felipe Mantilla

The following player received entry into the singles main draw as a special exempt:

- (El Salvador) Marcelo Arévalo

The following players received entry from the qualifying draw:

- (Guatemala) Christopher Díaz Figueroa
- (United States) Peter Kobelt
- (Brazil) Fabrício Neis
- (Peru) Juan Pablo Varillas

The following player received entry as a lucky loser:

- (Argentina) Juan Ignacio Galarza

== Women's singles main draw entrants ==
=== Seeds ===
Country	Player	Rank^{1}	Seed
ESP	Lourdes Domínguez Lino	108	1
COL	Mariana Duque	129	2
ISR	Julia Glushko	133	3
AUT	Patricia Mayr-Achleitner	135	4
ARG	Paula Ormaechea	139	5
BRA	Teliana Pereira	146	6
GER	Dinah Pfizenmaier	147	7
PAR	Verónica Cepede Royg	155	8

- ^{1} Rankings as of 23 March 2015

=== Other entrants ===
The following players received wildcards into the singles main draw:

- (Colombia) María Fernanda Herazo
- (Colombia) Yuliana Lizarazo
- (Colombia) Yuliana Monroy
- (Colombia) María Paulina Pérez

The following players received entry from the qualifying draw:

- (Italy) Martina Caregaro
- (United States) Lauren Embree
- (Italy) Gaia Sanesi
- (United States) Katerina Stewart

== Champions ==
=== Men's singles ===
- (Italy) Paolo Lorenzi def. (Chile) Gonzalo Lama, 7–6^{(7–3)}, 2–0 ret.

=== Women's singles ===
- (Brazil) Teliana Pereira def. (Paraguay) Verónica Cepede Royg, 7–6^{(8–6)}, 6–1

=== Men's doubles ===
- (Colombia) Nicolás Barrientos / (Colombia) Eduardo Struvay def. (Colombia) Alejandro Gómez / (Colombia) Felipe Mantilla, 7–6^{(8–6)}, 6–7^{(4–7)}, [10–4]

=== Women's doubles ===
- (Spain) Lourdes Domínguez Lino / (Luxembourg) Mandy Minella def. (Colombia) Mariana Duque / (Israel) Julia Glushko, 7–5, 4–6, [10–5]
