= 2013 Seguros Bolívar Open Medellín =

- Date: 22 – 28 July
- Edition: 10th
- Surface: Clay
- Location: Medellín, Colombia

Champions

Singles
- (Colombia) Alejandro González

Doubles
- (Ecuador) Emilio Gómez / (Moldova) Roman Borvanov
← 2012 ·	Seguros Bolívar Open Medellín	· 2014 →

The 2013 Seguros Bolívar Open Medellín was a professional tennis tournament played on clay courts. It was the tenth edition of the tournament which was part of the 2013 ATP Challenger Tour. It took place in Medellín, Colombia between July 22 and 28 2013.

== Singles main draw entrants ==
=== Seeds ===
Country	Player	Rank^{1}	Seed
COL	Alejandro González	159	1
ARG	Guido Andreozzi	182	2
ARG	Facundo Argüello	197	3
BRA	Fabiano de Paula	231	4
ARG	Agustín Velotti	235	5
ECU	Julio César Campozano	276	6
COL	Nicolás Barrientos	293	7
COL	Carlos Salamanca	310	8

- ^{1} Rankings are as of July 15, 2013.

=== Other entrants ===
The following players received wildcards into the singles main draw:

- (United States) Alvaro Ochoa
- (Ecuador) Giovanni Lapentti
- (Colombia) Eduardo Struvay
- (Colombia) Felipe Mantilla

The following players received entry from the qualifying draw:

- (Ecuador) Roberto Quiroz
- (Colombia) Daniel Elahi Galán
- (Colombia) Felipe Escobar
- (Colombia) Steffen Zornosa

== Champions ==
=== Singles ===
- (Colombia) Alejandro González def. (Argentina) Guido Andreozzi, 6–4, 6–4

=== Doubles ===
- (Ecuador) Emilio Gómez / (Moldova) Roman Borvanov def. (Colombia) Nicolás Barrientos / (Colombia) Eduardo Struvay, 6–3, 7–6^{(7–4)}
