= Roman Borvanov =

Moldovan tennis player

- Country (sports): Moldova
- Residence: Pembroke Pines, Florida, U.S.
- Born: 31 March 1982 (age 43); Chişinău, Moldavian SSR
- Height: 6 ft 0 in (183 cm)
- Turned pro: 2004
- Plays: Right-handed (double-handed backhand)
- Prize money: $142,053

Singles
- Career record: 0–2
- Career titles: 0; 0 Challenger, 9 Futures
- Highest ranking: No. 200 (24 October 2011)

Grand Slam singles results
- Australian Open: Q1 (2012)
- Wimbledon: Q1 (2012)
- US Open: Q1 (2011)

Doubles
- Career record: 0–2
- Career titles: 0; 3 Challenger, 7 Futures
- Highest ranking: No. 182 (6 January 2014)
- Last updated on: 26 May 2021.

Roman Borvanov (born 31 March 1982) is a professional tennis player who represents Moldova. He played NCAA collegiate tennis at the University of Portland. He represented the United States until the end of 2005.

Borvanov has won nine singles and seven doubles Futures titles in his career as well as three ATP Challenger Tour doubles titles. When he achieved his career high ATP singles ranking of 200 in October 2011 he became the first Moldovan player to ever be ranked in the top 200.

Roman was sponsored by several top tennis and sports brands.

== ATP Challenger and ITF Futures finals ==
=== Singles: 15 (9–6) ===
| Legend ATP Challenger (0–0) ITF Futures (9–6) | Finals by surface Hard (7–5) Clay (2–1) Grass (0–0) Carpet (0–0) |

| Result | W–L | Date | Tournament | Tier | Surface | Opponent | Score |
|---|---|---|---|---|---|---|---|
| Loss | 0–1 | Oct 2005 | Mexico F15, Ciudad Obregón | Futures | Hard | (Brazil) Rodrigo-Antonio Grilli | 1–6, 6–7^{(5–7)} |
| Win | 1–1 | Feb 2006 | Mexico F3, Mexico City | Futures | Hard | (Canada) Rahim Esmail | 7–5, 6–0 |
| Win | 2–1 | May 2006 | Mexico F7, Guadalajara | Futures | Clay | (Cuba) Lázaro Navarro | 7–5, 6–2 |
| Loss | 2–2 | Oct 2006 | Mexico F17, Ciudad Obregón | Futures | Hard | (Mexico) Miguel Gallardo Valles | 5–7, 6–3, 5–7 |
| Win | 3–2 | Nov 2006 | Mexico F20, Querétaro | Futures | Hard | (Brazil) Rodrigo-Antonio Grilli | 7–6^{(7–4)}, 6–2 |
| Win | 4–2 | Feb 2008 | Mexico F2, Naucalpan | Futures | Hard | (United States) Ryler Deheart | 7–5, 6–1 |
| Loss | 4–3 | Apr 2008 | Mexico F4, Córdoba | Futures | Hard | (United States) Nicholas Monroe | 3–6, 3–6 |
| Loss | 4–4 | Nov 2009 | Mexico F15, Puerto Vallarta | Futures | Hard | (El Salvador) Marcelo Arévalo | 3–6, 3–6 |
| Win | 5–4 | Nov 2010 | Mexico F8, Guadalajara | Futures | Clay | (Mexico) César Ramírez | 6–1, 6–4 |
| Win | 6–4 | Nov 2010 | Mexico F9, Durango | Futures | Hard | (Mexico) Víctor Romero | 6–3, 6–4 |
| Win | 7–4 | Jan 2011 | Mexico F1, Mexico City | Futures | Hard | (Mexico) Miguel Gallardo Valles | 4–6, 6–2, 6–4 |
| Loss | 7–5 | Jun 2011 | Mexico F5, Celaya | Futures | Hard | (Mexico) Miguel Gallardo Valles | 3–6, 4–6 |
| Win | 8–5 | Jun 2011 | Mexico F6, Puebla | Futures | Hard | (Uruguay) Marcel Felder | 4–6, 7–5, 6–4 |
| Win | 9–5 | Jan 2012 | Mexico F1, Monterrey | Futures | Hard | (Mexico) Daniel Garza | 6–2, 6–3 |
| Loss | 9–6 | Jun 2012 | Romania F3, Bacău | Futures | Clay | (Moldova) Radu Albot | 5–7, 4–6 |

=== Doubles: 17 (10–7) ===
| Legend ATP Challenger (3–1) ITF Futures (7–6) | Finals by surface Hard (5–6) Clay (4–1) Grass (0–0) Carpet (1–0) |

| Result | W–L | Date | Tournament | Tier | Surface | Partner | Opponents | Score |
|---|---|---|---|---|---|---|---|---|
| Loss | 0–1 | May 2006 | Mexico F6, Celaya | Futures | Hard | (Switzerland) Sven Swinnen | (Slovenia) Miha Gregorc (Canada) Philip Gubenco | 3–6, 6–1, 5–7 |
| Win | 1–1 | Mar 2007 | Switzerland F3, Wilen | Futures | Carpet | (Jamaica) Dustin Brown | (Switzerland) Patrick Eichenberger (Switzerland) Dylan Sessagesimi | 6–0, 6–7^{(9–11)}, 6–3 |
| Win | 2–1 | Sep 2007 | France F14, Plaisir | Futures | Hard | (France) Clement Reix | (France) Jonathan Eysseric (France) Jérôme Inzerillo | 5–7, 7–6^{(7–5)}, [10–7] |
| Win | 3–1 | Sep 2008 | Lubbock, United States | Challenger | Hard | (Russia) Artem Sitak | (United States) Alex Bogomolov Jr. (Serbia) Dušan Vemić | 6–2, 6–3 |
| Loss | 3–2 | Nov 2009 | Mexico F15, Puerto Vallarta | Futures | Hard | (Australia) Nima Roshan | (Mexico) Javier Herrera-Eguiluz (Mexico) César Ramírez | 3–6, 4–6 |
| Win | 4–2 | Nov 2010 | Mexico F9, Durango | Futures | Hard | (Mexico) Víctor Romero | (United States) Maciek Sykut (United States) Denis Zivkovic | 6–3, 6–4 |
| Win | 5–2 | Jan 2011 | USA F1, Plantation | Futures | Clay | (United States) Denis Zivkovic | (United Kingdom) Daniel Smethurst (United Kingdom) Alexander Ward | 6–4, 6–4 |
| Loss | 5–3 | Jan 2012 | Mexico F1, Monterrey | Futures | Hard | (Guatemala) Christopher Díaz Figueroa | (United States) Austin Krajicek (United States) Devin Britton | 2–6, 3–6 |
| Loss | 5–4 | Feb 2013 | Mexico F3, Mexico City | Futures | Hard | (United States) Adam El Mihdawy | (Colombia) Nicolás Barrientos (Guatemala) Christopher Díaz Figueroa | 5–7, 6–7^{(6–8)} |
| Win | 6–4 | Feb 2013 | Mexico F4, Tehuacan | Futures | Hard | (Guatemala) Christopher Díaz Figueroa | (Mexico) Miguel Ángel Reyes-Varela (Mexico) Alan Nunez Aguilera | 7–6^{(7–2)}, 6–2 |
| Loss | 6–5 | May 2013 | Guatemala F1, Guatemala City | Futures | Hard | (United States) Vahid Mirzadeh | (El Salvador) Marcelo Arévalo (Guatemala) Christopher Díaz Figueroa | 2–6, 6–7^{(0–7)} |
| Win | 7–5 | Jun 2013 | USA F15, Indian Harbour Beach | Futures | Clay | (Canada) Milan Pokrajac | (El Salvador) Marcelo Arévalo (Venezuela) Roberto Maytín | 7–6^{(7–4)}, 6–3 |
| Win | 8–5 | Jul 2013 | Canada F3, Kelowna | Futures | Hard | (Canada) Milan Pokrajac | (United States) Kyle Mcmorrow (United States) Nicolas Meister | 6–4, 7–5 |
| Loss | 8–6 | Jul 2013 | Canada F4, Saskatoon | Futures | Hard | (Canada) Milan Pokrajac | (United States) Austin Krajicek (United States) Tennys Sandgren | 4–6, 6–2, [6–10] |
| Win | 9–6 | Jul 2013 | Medellín, Colombia | Challenger | Clay | (Ecuador) Emilio Gómez | (Colombia) Nicolás Barrientos (Colombia) Eduardo Struvay | 6–3, 7–6^{(7–4)} |
| Win | 10–6 | Oct 2013 | São Paulo, Brazil | Challenger | Clay | (New Zealand) Artem Sitak | (Peru) Sergio Galdós (Argentina) Guido Pella | 6–4, 7–6^{(7–3)} |
| Loss | 10–7 | Nov 2013 | Guayaquil, Ecuador | Challenger | Clay | (Germany) Alexander Satschko | (Netherlands) Stephan Fransen (Netherlands) Wesley Koolhof | 6–1, 2–6, [5–10] |
