= Open Medellín =

Claro Open Medellín

Defunct tennis tournament
- Event name: Medellín
- Location: Medellín, Colombia
- Venue: Indeportes Antioquia
- Surface: Clay

Current champions (2021)
- Men's singles: (Brazil) Gilbert Klier Júnior
- Women's singles: (Colombia) Emiliana Arango
- Men's doubles: (Brazil) João Lucas Reis da Silva (Brazil) Gilbert Klier Júnior
- Women's doubles: (Brazil) Laura Pigossi (Colombia) María Herazo González
ATP Tour
- Category: ITF Men's Circuit M25
- Draw: 32S / 32Q / 16D
- Prize money: $25,000
WTA Tour
- Category: ITF Women's Circuit W25
- Draw: 32S / 32Q / 16D
- Prize money: $25,000

The Open Medellín was a professional tennis tournament played on outdoor clay courts.

The event was classified as a $10k ITF Women's Circuit tournament and an ATP Challenger event held in Medellín, Colombia, from 2004 to 2017 for ATP and from 2014 to 2015 for ITF. From 2006, the event was part of the ATP Challenger Tour, and prior to that, in 2004–05, part of the ITF Men's Circuit. Its last edition had been in 2017. Four years later, Medellín got back in the ITF route in 2021, classified as a $25,000 tournament for both men and women.

== Past finals ==
=== Men's singles ===
Year	Champion	Runner-up	Score
2021	(Brazil) Gilbert Klier Júnior	(Brazil) João Lucas Reis da Silva	6–2, 6–2
2017	(Chile) Nicolás Jarry	(Brazil) João Souza	6–1, 3–6, 7–6^{(7–0)}
2016	(Argentina) Facundo Bagnis	(Brazil) Caio Zampieri	6–7^{(3–7)}, 7–5, 6–2
2015	(Italy) Paolo Lorenzi	(Chile) Gonzalo Lama	7–6^{(7–3)}, 2–0^{r}
2014	(United States) Austin Krajicek	(Brazil) João Souza	7–5, 6–3
2013	(Colombia) Alejandro González	(Argentina) Guido Andreozzi	6–4, 6–4
2012	(Italy) Paolo Lorenzi	(Argentina) Leonardo Mayer	7–6^{(7–5)}, 6–7^{(4–7)}, 6–4
2011	(Dominican Republic) Víctor Estrella	(Colombia) Alejandro Falla	6–7^{(2–7)}, 6–4, 6–4
2010	(Brazil) Marcos Daniel	(Colombia) Juan Sebastián Cabal	6–3, 7–5
2009	(Argentina) Juan Ignacio Chela	(Brazil) João Souza	6–4, 4–6, 6–4
2008	(Argentina) Leonardo Mayer	(Argentina) Sergio Roitman	6–4, 7–5
2007	(Argentina) Eduardo Schwank	(Australia) Chris Guccione	7–5, 5–7, 7–5
2006	(Australia) Chris Guccione	(Colombia) Santiago Giraldo	7–6, 7–6
2005	(Colombia) Santiago Giraldo	(Argentina) Luciano Vitullo	2–6, 6–4, 7–5
2004	(Argentina) Sebastián Decoud	(Colombia) Michael Quintero	6–4, 7–5

=== Women's singles ===
Year	Champion	Runner-up	Score
2021	(Colombia) Emiliana Arango	(Brazil) Laura Pigossi	6–0, 6–0
2015	(Brazil) Teliana Pereira	(Paraguay) Verónica Cepede Royg	7–6^{(8–6)}, 6–1
2014	(Paraguay) Verónica Cepede Royg	(Romania) Irina-Camelia Begu	6–4, 4–6, 6–4

=== Men's doubles ===
Year	Champions	Runners-up	Score
2021	(Brazil) João Lucas Reis da Silva (Brazil) Gilbert Klier Júnior	(Brazil) Pedro Boscardin Dias (Brazil) Gustavo Heide	6–4, 4–6, [10–8]
2017	(Barbados) Darian King (Mexico) Miguel Ángel Reyes-Varela	(Chile) Nicolás Jarry (Ecuador) Roberto Quiroz	6–4, 6–4
2016	(Colombia) Alejandro Falla (Colombia) Eduardo Struvay	(Brazil) André Ghem (Spain) Juan Lizariturry	6–3, 6–2
2015	(Colombia) Nicolás Barrientos (Colombia) Eduardo Struvay	(Colombia) Alejandro Gómez (Colombia) Felipe Mantilla	7–6^{(8–6)}, 6–7^{(5–7)}, [10–4]
2014	(United States) Austin Krajicek (Mexico) César Ramírez	(Venezuela) Roberto Maytín (Argentina) Andrés Molteni	6–3, 7–5
2013	(Ecuador) Emilio Gómez (Moldova) Roman Borvanov	(Colombia) Nicolás Barrientos (Colombia) Eduardo Struvay	6–3, 7–6^{(7–4)}
2012	(United States) Nicholas Monroe (Germany) Simon Stadler	(Argentina) Renzo Olivo (Argentina) Marco Trungelliti	6–4, 6–4
2011	(Chile) Paul Capdeville (Chile) Nicolás Massú	(Italy) Alessio di Mauro (Italy) Matteo Viola	6–2, 4–6, [10–8]
2010	(Colombia) Juan Sebastián Cabal (Colombia) Robert Farah	(Brazil) Franco Ferreiro (Brazil) André Sá	6–3, 7–5
2009	(Argentina) Sebastián Decoud (Argentina) Eduardo Schwank	(Argentina) Diego Junqueira (Spain) David Marrero	6–0, 6–2
2008	(Colombia) Juan Sebastián Cabal (Colombia) Alejandro Falla	(Argentina) Juan-Pablo Amado (Dominican Republic) Víctor Estrella	3–4 retired
2007	(Uruguay) Pablo Cuevas (Argentina) Horacio Zeballos	(Mexico) Santiago González (Brazil) Bruno Soares	6–4, 6–4
2006	(Brazil) André Ghem (Brazil) Marcelo Melo	(Uruguay) Pablo Cuevas (Argentina) Horacio Zeballos	walkover
2005	(Chile) Felipe Parada (Argentina) Luciano Vitullo	(Colombia) Michael Quintero (Colombia) Sergio Ramírez	6–3, 7–5
2004	(Brazil) Lucas Engel (Brazil) André Ghem	(Chile) Jorge Aguilar (Chile) Guillermo Hormazábal	7–6, 6–3

=== Women's doubles ===
Year	Champions	Runners-up	Score
2021	(Brazil) Laura Pigossi (Colombia) María Herazo González	(United States) Rasheeda McAdoo (Mexico) Victoria Rodríguez	6–2, 7–5
2015	(Spain) Lourdes Domínguez Lino (Luxembourg) Mandy Minella	(Colombia) Mariana Duque Mariño (Israel) Julia Glushko	7–5, 4–6, [10–5]
2014	(Romania) Irina-Camelia Begu (Argentina) María Irigoyen	(Australia) Monique Adamczak (Russia) Marina Shamayko	6–2, 7–6^{(7–2)}
