= 2016 Milo Open Cali =

- Date: 4–10 July
- Edition: 9th
- Surface: Clay
- Location: Cali, Colombia

Champions

Singles
- (Barbados) Darian King

Doubles
- (Chile) Nicolás Jarry / (Chile) Hans Podlipnik
← 2015 ·	Milo Open Cali	· 2017 →

The 2016 Milo Open Cali was a professional tennis tournament played on clay courts. It was the ninth edition of the tournament, which is part of the 2016 ATP Challenger Tour. It took place in Cali, Colombia between 4 and 10 July 2016.

== Singles main-draw entrants ==
=== Seeds ===
Country	Player	Rank	Seed
DOM	Víctor Estrella Burgos	77	1
COL	Alejandro González	154	2
CHI	Gonzalo Lama	161	3
COL	Eduardo Struvay	162	4
BRA	João Souza	183	5
ESA	Marcelo Arévalo	218	6
BAR	Darian King	255	7
ARG	Juan Ignacio Londero	258	8

- ^{1} Rankings as of June 27, 2016.

=== Other entrants ===
The following players received wildcards into

- (Ecuador) Giovanni Lapentti
- (Colombia) Felipe Mantilla
- (Colombia) Nicolás Mejía
- (Colombia) Cristian Rodríguez

The following player entered the singles main draw with a protected ranking:

- (Colombia) Carlos Salamanca

The following players received entry from the qualifying draw:

- (Chile) Marcelo Tomás Barrios Vera
- (Colombia) Juan Sebastián Gómez
- (Chile) Nicolás Jarry
- (Ecuador) Roberto Quiroz

== Doubles main-draw entrants ==
=== Seeds ===
Country	Player	Country	Player	Rank^{1}	Seed
ESA	Marcelo Arévalo	BRA	João Souza	289	1
COL	Nicolás Barrientos	VEN	Roberto Maytín	345	2
CHI	Nicolás Jarry	CHI	Hans Podlipnik	542	3
GUA	Christopher Díaz Figueroa	VEN	Luis David Martínez	581	4

- ^{1} Rankings as of June 27, 2016.

=== Other entrants ===
The following pairs received wildcards into the singles main draw:

- (Colombia) José Daniel Bendeck / (Colombia) Nicolás Mejía
- (Colombia) Alejandro Gómez / (Colombia) Felipe Mantilla
- (Colombia) Juan Sebastián Gómez / (Colombia) Cristian Rodríguez

== Champions ==
=== Singles ===
- (Barbados) Darian King def. (Dominican Republic) Víctor Estrella Burgos, 5–7, 6–4, 7–5

=== Doubles ===
- (Chile) Nicolás Jarry / (Chile) Hans Podlipnik def. (Italy) Erik Crepaldi / (Brazil) Daniel Dutra da Silva, 6–1, 7–6^{(8–6)}
