= 2016 Milo Open Cali – Singles =

Singles
- 2016 Milo Open Cali

Final
- Champion: (Barbados) Darian King
- Runner-up: (Dominican Republic) Víctor Estrella Burgos
- Score: 5–7, 6–4, 7–5

Events
Singles	Doubles
← 2015 ·	Milo Open Cali	· 2017 →

Fernando Romboli was the defending champion but chose not to participate.

Darian King won the title after defeating Víctor Estrella Burgos 5–7, 6–4, 7–5 in the final.

== Seeds ==
1. (Dominican Republic) Víctor Estrella Burgos (final)
2. (Colombia) Alejandro González (first round)
3. (Chile) Gonzalo Lama (first round)
4. (Colombia) Eduardo Struvay (second round)
5. (Brazil) João Souza (quarterfinals)
6. (El Salvador) Marcelo Arévalo (first round)
7. (Barbados) Darian King (champion)
8. (Argentina) Juan Ignacio Londero (first round)

== Draw ==
=== Key ===
- Q = Qualifier
- WC = Wild card
- LL = Lucky loser
- Alt = Alternate
- ITF = ITF entry
- PR = Protected ranking
- SR = Special ranking
- SE = Special exempt
- JE = Junior exempt
- JR = Junior Accelerator Programme entrant
- CO = College Accelerator Programme entrant
- NG = Next Gen Accelerator Program entrant
- w/o = Walkover
- r = Retired
- d = Defaulted

=== Finals ===
Semifinals
1	(Dominican Republic) Víctor Estrella Burgos	6	6
(Argentina) Federico Coria	3	2
(Dominican Republic) José Hernández	6^{3}	3
7	(Barbados) Darian King	7^{7}	6

Final
1	(Dominican Republic) Víctor Estrella Burgos	7	4	5
7	(Barbados) Darian King	5	6	7

=== Top half ===
First round
1	(Dominican Republic) V Estrella Burgos	6	6
WC	(Colombia) Felipe Mantilla	3	2
(Brazil) D Dutra da Silva	3	4
Q	(Chile) N Jarry	6	6
(Italy) Erik Crepaldi	7^{7}	6
(United States) Connor Smith	6^{5}	2
(Colombia) N Barrientos	1	6	6
8	(Argentina) JI Londero	6	0	4
4	(Colombia) E Struvay	6	4	6
(Colombia) DE Galán	3	6	1
Q	(Chile) MT Barrios Vera	6	6
Q	(Colombia) JS Gómez	4	2
(Mexico) L Gómez	6	5	5
(Argentina) F Coria	3	7	7
(Ecuador) E Gómez	7^{7}	6
6	(El Salvador) M Arévalo	6^{4}	3

Second round
1	(Dominican Republic) V Estrella Burgos	6	6
Q	(Chile) N Jarry	4	4
(Italy) E Crepaldi	2	2
(Colombia) N Barrientos	6	6
4	(Colombia) E Struvay	5	4
Q	(Chile) MT Barrios Vera	7	6
(Argentina) F Coria	1	6	7^{12}
(Ecuador) E Gómez	6	3	6^{10}

Quarterfinals
1	(Dominican Republic) V Estrella Burgos	6	0
(Colombia) N Barrientos	3	0^{r}
Q	(Chile) MT Barrios Vera	3	3
(Argentina) F Coria	6	6

Semifinals
1	(Dominican Republic) V Estrella Burgos	6	6
(Argentina) F Coria	3	2

=== Bottom half ===
First round
5	(Brazil) J Souza	6	6
(Chile) H Podlipnik	2	2
(Argentina) F Mena	6	6
PR	(Colombia) C Salamanca	2	1
(Dominican Republic) J Hernández	6	6
(Argentina) Maximiliano Estévez	0	2
Q	(Ecuador) R Quiroz	6	6
3	(Chile) G Lama	4	4
7	(Barbados) D King	6	6
(Colombia) A Gómez	4	0
WC	(Ecuador) G Lapentti	7	7^{7}
(Guatemala) C Díaz Figueroa	5	6^{4}
WC	(Colombia) C Rodríguez	6	6
WC	(Colombia) N Mejía	4	3
(Japan) A Santillan	6	7
2	(Colombia) A González	3	5

Second round
5	(Brazil) J Souza	6	6
(Argentina) F Mena	4	2
(Dominican Republic) J Hernández	6	6
Q	(Ecuador) R Quiroz	2	3
7	(Barbados) D King	7	6
WC	(Ecuador) G Lapentti	5	2
WC	(Colombia) C Rodríguez	6	6
(Japan) A Santillan	4	3

Quarterfinals
5	(Brazil) J Souza	4	6	6^{4}
(Dominican Republic) J Hernández	6	3	7^{7}
7	(Barbados) D King	6	5	6
WC	(Colombia) C Rodríguez	4	7	1

Semifinals
(Dominican Republic) J Hernández	6^{3}	3
7	(Barbados) D King	7^{7}	6
