= 2016 São Paulo Challenger de Tênis =

Professional tennis tournament

- Date: 18–24 April
- Edition: 6th
- Draw: 32S / 16D
- Prize money: $50,000+H
- Surface: Clay
- Location: São Paulo, Brazil

Champions

Singles
- (Chile) Gonzalo Lama

Doubles
- (Brazil) Fabrício Neis / (Brazil) Caio Zampieri
| ← 2015 · | São Paulo Challenger de Tênis | · 2017 → |

The 2016 São Paulo Challenger de Tênis was a professional tennis tournament played on clay courts. It was the sixth edition of the tournament which was part of the 2016 ATP Challenger Tour. It took place in São Paulo, Brazil between 18 and 24 April 2016.

== Singles main-draw entrants ==
=== Seeds ===
| Country | Player | Rank^{1} | Seed |
|---|---|---|---|
| BRA | André Ghem | 165 | 1 |
| BRA | João Souza | 187 | 2 |
| BRA | Guilherme Clezar | 194 | 3 |
| BRA | Thiago Monteiro | 200 | 4 |
| CHI | Gonzalo Lama | 216 | 5 |
| SLV | Marcelo Arévalo | 222 | 6 |
| SWE | Christian Lindell | 239 | 7 |
| ARG | Maximiliano Estévez | 273 | 8 |

- ^{1} Rankings as of 11 April 2016.

=== Other entrants ===
The following players received wildcards into the singles main draw:

- (Brazil) Gabriel Décamps
- (Brazil) Rafael Camilo
- (Brazil) Wilson Leite
- (Brazil) Felipe Meligeni Alves

The following players received entry from the qualifying draw:

- (Brazil) João Pedro Sorgi
- (Brazil) Ricardo Hocevar
- (Brazil) André Miele
- (Brazil) Alexandre Tsuchiya

== Champions ==
=== Singles ===
- (Chile) Gonzalo Lama def. (United States) Ernesto Escobedo, 6–2, 6–2

=== Doubles ===
- (Brazil) Fabrício Neis / (Brazil) Caio Zampieri def. (Brazil) José Pereira / (Brazil) Alexandre Tsuchiya, 6–4, 7–6^{(7–3)}
