= 2013 Seguros Bolívar Open Cali =

- Date: 9–15 September
- Edition: 6th
- Surface: Clay
- Location: Cali, Colombia

Champions

Singles
- (Argentina) Facundo Bagnis

Doubles
- (Argentina) Guido Andreozzi / (Argentina) Eduardo Schwank
← 2012 ·	Seguros Bolívar Open Cali	· 2014 →

The 2013 Seguros Bolívar Open Cali was a professional tennis tournament played on clay courts. It was the sixth edition of the tournament which was part of the 2013 ATP Challenger Tour. It took place in Cali, Colombia between 9 and 15 September 2013.

== Singles main draw entrants ==
=== Seeds ===
Country	Player	Rank^{1}	Seed
BRA	João Souza	121	1
ARG	Guido Andreozzi	160	2
ARG	Agustín Velotti	170	3
ARG	Facundo Bagnis	180	4
ARG	Facundo Argüello	208	5
BRA	Fabiano de Paula	228	6
BRA	Ricardo Hocevar	260	7
COL	Carlos Salamanca	270	8

- ^{1} Rankings are as of August 26, 2013.

=== Other entrants ===
The following players received wildcards into the singles main draw:

- (Ecuador) Giovanni Lapentti
- (Colombia) Alvaro Ochoa
- (Colombia) Eduardo Struvay
- (Colombia) Carlos Salamanca

The following players received entry from the qualifying draw:

- (Argentina) Juan Ignacio Londero
- (Peru) Duilio Beretta
- (Argentina) Sebastian Exequiel Pini
- (Brazil) Fernando Romboli

== Champions ==
=== Singles ===
- (Argentina) Facundo Bagnis def. (Argentina) Facundo Argüello 6–2, 4–6, 6–3

=== Doubles ===
- (Argentina) Guido Andreozzi / (Argentina) Eduardo Schwank def. (Colombia) Carlos Salamanca / (Brazil) João Souza 6–2, 6–4
