= 2017 Milo Open Cali =

- Date: 16–21 October
- Edition: 10th
- Surface: Clay
- Location: Cali, Colombia

Champions

Singles
- (Argentina) Federico Delbonis

Doubles
- (El Salvador) Marcelo Arévalo / (Mexico) Miguel Ángel Reyes-Varela
← 2016 ·	Milo Open Cali	· 2018 →

The 2017 Milo Open Cali was a professional tennis tournament played on clay courts. It was the tenth edition of the tournament which was part of the 2017 ATP Challenger Tour. It took place in Cali, Colombia between 16 and 21 October 2017.

== Singles main-draw entrants ==
=== Seeds ===
Country	Player	Rank	Seed
ARG	Horacio Zeballos	67	1
ARG	Federico Delbonis	70	2
DOM	Víctor Estrella Burgos	78	3
ESP	Roberto Carballés Baena	103	4
AUT	Gerald Melzer	156	5
SVK	Jozef Kovalík	167	6
ESP	Ricardo Ojeda Lara	171	7
SVK	Andrej Martin	177	8

- ^{1} Rankings as of 9 October 2017.

=== Other entrants ===
The following players received wildcards into the singles main draw:

- (United States) Charles Force
- (Colombia) Alejandro González
- (Colombia) Cristian Rodríguez
- (Colombia) Luis Valero

The following players received entry from the qualifying draw:

- (Chile) Gonzalo Lama
- (Argentina) Juan Ignacio Londero
- (Spain) Daniel Muñoz de la Nava
- (Spain) Mario Vilella Martínez

== Champions ==
=== Singles ===
- (Argentina) Federico Delbonis def. (Brazil) Guilherme Clezar 7–6^{(12–10)}, 7–5.

=== Doubles ===
- (El Salvador) Marcelo Arévalo / (Mexico) Miguel Ángel Reyes-Varela def. (Peru) Sergio Galdós / (Brazil) Fabrício Neis 6–3, 6–4.
