= 2016 Milo Open Cali – Doubles =

Doubles
- 2016 Milo Open Cali

Final
- Champion: (Chile) Nicolás Jarry (Chile) Hans Podlipnik
- Runner-up: (Italy) Erik Crepaldi (Brazil) Daniel Dutra da Silva
- Score: 6–1, 7–6^{(8–6)}

Events
Singles	Doubles
← 2015 ·	Milo Open Cali	· 2017 →

Marcelo Demoliner and Miguel Ángel Reyes-Varela were the defending champions but chose not to defend their title.

Nicolás Jarry and Hans Podlipnik won the title after defeating Erik Crepaldi and Daniel Dutra da Silva 6–1, 7–6^{(8–6)} in the final.

== Seeds ==
1. (El Salvador) Marcelo Arévalo / (Brazil) João Souza (quarterfinals)
2. (Colombia) Nicolás Barrientos / (Venezuela) Roberto Maytín (quarterfinals)
3. (Chile) Nicolás Jarry / (Chile) Hans Podlipnik (champions)
4. (Guatemala) Christopher Díaz Figueroa / (Venezuela) Luis David Martínez (first round)

== Draw ==
=== Key ===
- Q = Qualifier
- WC = Wild card
- LL = Lucky loser
- Alt = Alternate
- SE = Special exempt
- PR = Protected ranking
- ITF = ITF entry
- JE = Junior exempt
- w/o = Walkover
- r = Retired
- d = Defaulted
- SR = Special ranking

First round
1	(El Salvador) M Arévalo (Brazil) J Souza	7^{7}	6
PR	(Colombia) C Salamanca (Japan) A Santillan	6^{2}	2
(Barbados) D King (Mexico) L Patiño	6	7^{7}
(Argentina) F Coria (Argentina) Maximiliano Estévez	4	6^{4}
3	(Chile) N Jarry (Chile) H Podlipnik	7	6
(Ecuador) I Endara (United States) Connor Smith	5	1
WC	(Colombia) A Gómez (Colombia) Felipe Mantilla	7^{7}	3	[10]
(Argentina) F Mena (Chile) Jorge Montero	6^{5}	6	[8]
(Dominican Republic) J Hernández (Argentina) JI Londero	2	3
(Italy) Erik Crepaldi (Brazil) D Dutra da Silva	6	6
WC	(Colombia) JS Gómez (Colombia) C Rodríguez	6	7^{7}
4	(Guatemala) C Díaz Figueroa (Venezuela) LD Martínez	3	6^{3}
(Ecuador) E Gómez (Ecuador) R Quiroz	4	7^{7}	[10]
(Colombia) A González (Colombia) E Struvay	6	6^{3}	[7]
WC	(Colombia) José Daniel Bendeck (Colombia) N Mejía	4	3
2	(Colombia) N Barrientos (Venezuela) R Maytín	6	6

Quarterfinals
1	(El Salvador) M Arévalo (Brazil) J Souza	0	6^{3}
(Barbados) D King (Mexico) L Patiño	6	7^{7}
3	(Chile) N Jarry (Chile) H Podlipnik	6	6
WC	(Colombia) A Gómez (Colombia) F Mantilla	3	1
(Italy) E Crepaldi (Brazil) D Dutra da Silva	3	6	[10]
WC	(Colombia) JS Gómez (Colombia) C Rodríguez	6	1	[5]
(Ecuador) E Gómez (Ecuador) R Quiroz	4	6	[10]
2	(Colombia) N Barrientos (Venezuela) R Maytín	6	4	[4]

Semifinals
(Barbados) D King (Mexico) L Patiño	5	3
3	(Chile) N Jarry (Chile) H Podlipnik	7	6
(Italy) E Crepaldi (Brazil) D Dutra da Silva	3
(Ecuador) E Gómez (Ecuador) R Quiroz	0^{r}

Final
3	(Chile) N Jarry (Chile) H Podlipnik	6	7^{8}
(Italy) E Crepaldi (Brazil) D Dutra da Silva	1	6^{6}
