= 2011 Seguros Bolívar Open Cali – Singles =

Singles
- 2011 Seguros Bolívar Open Cali

Final
- Champion: (Colombia) Alejandro Falla
- Runner-up: (Argentina) Eduardo Schwank
- Score: 6–4, 6–3

Events
Singles	Doubles
← 2010 ·	Seguros Bolívar Open Cali	· 2012 →

Carlos Salamanca was the defending champion but lost to Agustín Velotti in the second round.

Alejandro Falla won his second title of this tournament. He defeated Eduardo Schwank 6–4, 6–3 in the final.

== Seeds ==
1. (Argentina) Horacio Zeballos (quarterfinals)
2. (Colombia) Alejandro Falla (champion)
3. (Argentina) Facundo Bagnis (quarterfinals)
4. (Colombia) Carlos Salamanca (second round)
5. (Dominican Republic) Víctor Estrella (semifinals, retired due to left leg injury)
6. (Colombia) Juan Sebastián Cabal (second round)
7. (Argentina) Eduardo Schwank (final)
8. (Colombia) Alejandro González (quarterfinals)

== Draw ==
=== Key ===
- Q = Qualifier
- WC = Wild card
- LL = Lucky loser
- Alt = Alternate
- ITF = ITF entry
- PR = Protected ranking
- SR = Special ranking
- SE = Special exempt
- JE = Junior exempt
- JR = Junior Accelerator Programme entrant
- CO = College Accelerator Programme entrant
- NG = Next Gen Accelerator Program entrant
- w/o = Walkover
- r = Retired
- d = Defaulted

=== Finals ===
Semifinals
(Argentina) Marco Trungelliti	3	6	3
7	(Argentina) Eduardo Schwank	6	3	6
5	(Dominican Republic) Víctor Estrella	6	6^{2}	1^{r}
2/WC	(Colombia) Alejandro Falla	2	7^{7}	4

Final
7	(Argentina) Eduardo Schwank	4	3
2/WC	(Colombia) Alejandro Falla	6	6

=== Top half ===
First round
1/WC	(Argentina) H Zeballos	6	6
(Peru) M Echazú	1	2
(Romania) C Gârd	2	1
(Argentina) S Decoud	6	6
(Argentina) M Trungelliti	6	6
(Mexico) D Garza	3	1
LL	(Colombia) Steffen Zornosa	3	5
6	(Colombia) JS Cabal	6	7
3	(Argentina) F Bagnis	6	7^{9}
(Colombia) R Farah	3	6^{7}
Q	(Argentina) Juan Pablo Ortiz	1	5
(Ecuador) JC Campozano	6	7
Q	(Colombia) JS Gómez	6^{6}	0
(Italy) M Marrai	7^{8}	6
(Colombia) E Struvay	4	6^{4}
7	(Argentina) E Schwank	6	7^{7}

Second round
1/WC	(Argentina) H Zeballos	6^{2}	7	6
(Argentina) S Decoud	7^{7}	5	4
(Argentina) M Trungelliti	4	6	7^{7}
6	(Colombia) JS Cabal	6	3	6^{1}
3	(Argentina) F Bagnis	4	6	7^{10}
(Ecuador) JC Campozano	6	3	6^{8}
(Italy) M Marrai	6^{5}	2
7	(Argentina) E Schwank	7^{7}	6

Quarterfinals
1/WC	(Argentina) H Zeballos	6^{3}	6	6^{5}
(Argentina) M Trungelliti	7^{7}	2	7^{7}
3	(Argentina) F Bagnis	3	4
7	(Argentina) E Schwank	6	6

Semifinals
(Argentina) M Trungelliti	3	6	3
7	(Argentina) E Schwank	6	3	6

=== Bottom half ===
First round
5	(Dominican Republic) V Estrella	6	6
(United States) Greg Ouellette	3	2
(Chile) A García	3	3
(Argentina) Cristián Benedetti	6	6
(Austria) G Melzer	1	6	2
(Argentina) A Velotti	6	4	6
WC	(Colombia) N Barrientos	6	3	1
4	(Colombia) C Salamanca	2	6	6
8	(Colombia) A González	6	6
(Chile) G Rivera Aránguiz	4	4
WC	(Colombia) Felipe Escobar	6	2	4
Q	(Colombia) Sebastián Serrano	1	6	6
Q	(Colombia) M Quintero	6	4	1
PR	(United States) K Kim	0	6	6
(Chile) C Saavedra-Corvalán	4	5
2/WC	(Colombia) A Falla	6	7

Second round
5	(Dominican Republic) V Estrella	6	6
(Argentina) C Benedetti	3	1
(Argentina) A Velotti	7^{7}	6
4	(Colombia) C Salamanca	6^{5}	0
8	(Colombia) A González	6	6
Q	(Colombia) S Serrano	2	2
PR	(United States) K Kim	1	4
2/WC	(Colombia) A Falla	6	6

Quarterfinals
5	(Dominican Republic) V Estrella	4	6	7^{7}
(Argentina) A Velotti	6	1	6^{3}
8	(Colombia) A González	2	5
2/WC	(Colombia) A Falla	6	7

Semifinals
5	(Dominican Republic) V Estrella	6	6^{2}	1^{r}
2/WC	(Colombia) A Falla	2	7^{7}	4
