= 2009 Seguros Bolívar Open Cali =

Tennis tournament

- Date: 14 – 20 September
- Edition: 2nd
- Location: Cali, Colombia

Champions

Singles
- (Colombia) Alejandro Falla

Doubles
- (Argentina) Sebastián Prieto / (Argentina) Horacio Zeballos
← 2008 ·	Seguros Bolívar Open Cali	· 2010 →

The 2009 Seguros Bolívar Open Cali was a professional tennis tournament played on outdoor red clay courts. It was the second edition of the tournament which was part of the 2009 ATP Challenger Tour. It took place in Cali, Colombia between 14 and 20 September 2009.

== Singles main draw entrants ==
=== Seeds ===
Nationality	Player	Ranking*	Seeding
ARG	Horacio Zeballos	76	1
COL	Santiago Giraldo	123	2
ARG	Sergio Roitman	125	3
ARG	Brian Dabul	131	4
ARG	Juan Ignacio Chela	137	5
ARG	Sebastián Decoud	139	6
COL	Alejandro Falla	160	7
BRA	Ricardo Hocevar	179	8

- Rankings are as of August 31, 2009.

=== Other entrants ===
The following players received wildcards into the singles main draw:

- (Colombia) Juan Sebastián Cabal
- (Colombia) Alejandro Gómez
- (Slovenia) Borut Puc
- (Colombia) Eduardo Struvay

The following players received entry from the qualifying draw:

- (Mexico) Tigre Hank
- (Colombia) Michael Quintero
- (Colombia) Sebastián Serrano
- (Argentina) Nicolás Todero

== Champions ==
=== Singles ===
(Colombia) Alejandro Falla def. (Argentina) Horacio Zeballos, 6–3, 6–4

=== Doubles ===
(Argentina) Sebastián Prieto / (Argentina) Horacio Zeballos def. (Brazil) Ricardo Hocevar / (Brazil) João Souza, 4–6, 6–3, [10–5]
