= 2012 Seguros Bolívar Open Cali – Doubles =

Doubles
- 2012 Seguros Bolívar Open Cali

Final
- Champions: (Colombia) Juan Sebastián Cabal (Colombia) Robert Farah
- Runners-up: (Brazil) Marcelo Demoliner (Brazil) João Souza
- Score: 6–3, 7–6^{(7–4)}

Events
Singles	Doubles
← 2011 ·	Seguros Bolívar Open Cali	· 2013 →

Juan Sebastián Cabal and Robert Farah successfully defended their title by defeating Marcelo Demoliner and João Souza 6–3, 7–6^{(7–4)} in the final.

== Seeds ==
1. (Colombia) Juan Sebastián Cabal / (Colombia) Robert Farah (champions)
2. (Brazil) Marcelo Demoliner / (Brazil) João Souza (final)
3. (Uruguay) Marcel Felder / (Argentina) Máximo González (quarterfinals)
4. (Argentina) Facundo Bagnis / (Argentina) Guido Pella (semifinals)

== Draw ==
=== Key ===
- Q = Qualifier
- WC = Wild card
- LL = Lucky loser
- Alt = Alternate
- SE = Special exempt
- PR = Protected ranking
- ITF = ITF entry
- JE = Junior exempt
- w/o = Walkover
- r = Retired
- d = Defaulted
- SR = Special ranking

=== Draw ===
First round
1	(Colombia) JS Cabal (Colombia) R Farah	6^{7}	6	[10]
(Uruguay) A Behar (Argentina) M Trungelliti	7^{9}	3	[5]
(Colombia) A González (Colombia) C Salamanca	7^{7}	5	[6]
(Brazil) G Clezar (Brazil) A Ghem	6^{4}	7	[10]
4	(Argentina) F Bagnis (Argentina) G Pella	7^{7}	7^{7}
(Argentina) M Alund (Argentina) D Junqueira	6^{3}	6^{3}
(Brazil) Fabiano de Paula (Argentina) A Molteni	6	2	[10]
(United States) W Odesnik (Spain) R Ramírez Hidalgo	4	6	[8]
WC	(Colombia) Francisco Franco (Colombia) Steffen Zornosa	4	6^{3}
WC	(Colombia) Felipe Mantilla (Colombia) Sebastian Serrano	6	7^{7}
WC	(Colombia) N Barrientos (Colombia) JS Gómez	1^{r}
3	(Uruguay) M Felder (Argentina) M González	1
(Brazil) T Alves (Brazil) R Hocevar	6^{3}	7^{7}	[10]
(United States) A Collarini (Argentina) A Velotti	7^{7}	6^{4}	[6]
(United States) V Mirzadeh (United States) M Sykut	5	3
2	(Brazil) M Demoliner (Brazil) J Souza	7	6

Quarterfinals
1	(Colombia) JS Cabal (Colombia) R Farah	6	6
(Brazil) G Clezar (Brazil) A Ghem	2	3
4	(Argentina) F Bagnis (Argentina) G Pella	5	6	[10]
(Brazil) F de Paula (Argentina) A Molteni	7	3	[7]
WC	(Colombia) F Mantilla (Colombia) S Serrano	4	7^{8}	[10]
3	(Uruguay) M Felder (Argentina) M González	6	6^{6}	[7]
(Brazil) T Alves (Brazil) R Hocevar	1	3
2	(Brazil) M Demoliner (Brazil) J Souza	6	6

Semifinals
1	(Colombia) JS Cabal (Colombia) R Farah	4	7	[12]
4	(Argentina) F Bagnis (Argentina) G Pella	6	5	[10]
WC	(Colombia) F Mantilla (Colombia) S Serrano	1	2
2	(Brazil) M Demoliner (Brazil) J Souza	6	6

Final
1	(Colombia) JS Cabal (Colombia) R Farah	6	7^{7}
2	(Brazil) M Demoliner (Brazil) J Souza	3	6^{4}
