= 2010 Seguros Bolívar Open Cali =

- Date: 27 September – 3 October
- Edition: 3rd
- Location: Cali, Colombia

Champions

Singles
- (Colombia) Carlos Salamanca

Doubles
- (Germany) Andre Begemann / (Germany) Martin Emmrich
← 2009 ·	Seguros Bolívar Open Cali	· 2011 →

The 2010 Seguros Bolívar Open Cali was a professional tennis tournament played on outdoor red clay courts. It was the third edition of the tournament which was part of the 2010 ATP Challenger Tour. It took place in Cali, Colombia between 27 September and 3 October 2010.

== ATP entrants ==
=== Seeds ===
Nationality	Player	Ranking*	Seeding
PAR	Ramón Delgado	135	1
BRA	João Souza	138	2
COL	Carlos Salamanca	147	3
BRA	Marcos Daniel	154	4
RSA	Izak van der Merwe	162	5
BRA	Rogério Dutra da Silva	179	6
GER	Andre Begemann	185	7
BRA	Caio Zampieri	202	8

- Rankings are as of September 20, 2010.

=== Other entrants ===
The following players received wildcards into the singles main draw:

- (Colombia) Juan Sebastián Gómez
- (Brazil) Roggan Gracie
- (Colombia) Giovanni Lapentti
- (Colombia) Eduardo Struvay

The following players received entry from the qualifying draw:

- (Ecuador) Júlio César Campozano
- (Brazil) Leonardo Kirche
- (Brazil) José Pereira
- (South Korea) Daniel Yoo

== Champions ==
=== Singles ===
(Colombia) Carlos Salamanca def. (Brazil) Júlio Silva, 7–5, 3–6, 6–3

=== Doubles ===
(Germany) Andre Begemann / (Germany) Martin Emmrich def. (Germany) Gero Kretschmer / (Germany) Alex Satschko, 6–4, 7–6(5)
