= 2012 Seguros Bolívar Open Cali =

- Date: 10–16 September
- Edition: 5th
- Surface: Clay
- Location: Cali, Colombia

Champions

Singles
- (Brazil) João Souza

Doubles
- (Colombia) Juan Sebastián Cabal / (Colombia) Robert Farah
| ← 2011 · | Seguros Bolívar Open Cali | · 2013 → |

The 2012 Seguros Bolívar Open Cali was a professional tennis tournament played on clay courts. It was the fifth edition of the tournament which was part of the 2012 ATP Challenger Tour. It took place in Cali, Colombia between 10 and 16 September 2012.

== Singles main draw entrants ==
=== Seeds ===
| Country | Player | Rank^{1} | Seed |
|---|---|---|---|
| COL | Santiago Giraldo | 46 | 1 |
| COL | Alejandro Falla | 51 | 2 |
| ESP | Rubén Ramírez Hidalgo | 94 | 3 |
| USA | Wayne Odesnik | 136 | 4 |
| BRA | Thiago Alves | 138 | 5 |
| ARG | Martín Alund | 140 | 6 |
| ARG | Guido Pella | 152 | 7 |
| BRA | João Souza | 155 | 8 |

- ^{1} Rankings are as of August 27, 2012.

=== Other entrants ===
The following players received wildcards into the singles main draw:

- (Argentina) Facundo Bagnis
- (Colombia) Nicolás Barrientos
- (Colombia) Santiago Giraldo
- (Colombia) Felipe Mantilla

The following players received entry from the qualifying draw:

- (Brazil) Fabiano de Paula
- (Colombia) Juan Sebastián Gómez
- (United States) Kevin Kim
- (Colombia) Sebastian Serrano

== Champions ==
=== Singles ===
- (Brazil) João Souza def. (Brazil) Thiago Alves, 6–2, 6–4

=== Doubles ===
- (Colombia) Juan Sebastián Cabal / (Colombia) Robert Farah def. (Brazil) Marcelo Demoliner / (Brazil) João Souza, 6–3, 7–6^{(7–4)}
