= 2011 Seguros Bolívar Open Cali =

Tennis tournament

- Date: 19–25 September
- Edition: 4th
- Location: Cali, Colombia

Champions

Singles
- (Colombia) Alejandro Falla

Doubles
- (Colombia) Juan Sebastián Cabal / (Colombia) Robert Farah
← 2010 ·	Seguros Bolívar Open Cali	· 2012 →

The 2011 Seguros Bolívar Open Cali was a professional tennis tournament played on clay courts. It was the fourth edition of the tournament which was part of the 2011 ATP Challenger Tour. It took place in Cali, Colombia between 19 and 25 September 2011.

== Singles main-draw entrants ==
=== Seeds ===
Country	Player	Rank^{1}	Seed
ARG	Horacio Zeballos	109	1
COL	Alejandro Falla	114	2
ARG	Facundo Bagnis	169	3
COL	Carlos Salamanca	172	4
DOM	Víctor Estrella	229	5
COL	Juan Sebastián Cabal	237	6
ARG	Eduardo Schwank	242	7
COL	Alejandro González	257	8

- ^{1} Rankings are as of September 12, 2011.

=== Other entrants ===
The following players received wildcards into the singles main draw:

- (Colombia) Nicolás Barrientos
- (Colombia) Felipe Escobar
- (Colombia) Alejandro Falla
- (Argentina) Horacio Zeballos

The following players received entry from the qualifying draw:

- (Colombia) Juan Sebastián Gómez
- (Argentina) Juan Pablo Ortiz
- (Colombia) Michael Quintero
- (Colombia) Sebastián Serrano

The following players received entry as a lucky loser into the singles main draw:

- (Colombia) Steffen Zornosa

== Champions ==
=== Singles ===
(Colombia) Alejandro Falla def. (Argentina) Eduardo Schwank, 6–4, 6–3

=== Doubles ===
(Colombia) Juan Sebastián Cabal / (Colombia) Robert Farah def. (Argentina) Facundo Bagnis / (Argentina) Eduardo Schwank, 7–5, 6–2
