= 2016 São Paulo Challenger de Tênis – Doubles =

Tennis tournament event

Doubles
- 2016 São Paulo Challenger de Tênis

Final
- Champion: (Brazil) Fabrício Neis (Brazil) Caio Zampieri
- Runner-up: (Brazil) José Pereira (Brazil) Alexandre Tsuchiya
- Score: 6–4, 7–6^{(7–3)}

Events
Singles	Doubles
- São Paulo Challenger de Tênis

Chase Buchanan and Blaž Rola were the defending champions but chose not to participate.

Fabrício Neis and Caio Zampieri won the title, defeating José Pereira and Alexandre Tsuchiya 6–4, 7–6^{(7–3)} in the final.

== Seeds ==
1. (El Salvador) Marcelo Arévalo / (Peru) Sergio Galdós (semifinals)
2. (Brazil) André Ghem / (Brazil) João Souza (quarterfinals)
3. (Brazil) Fabrício Neis / (Brazil) Caio Zampieri (champions)
4. (Italy) Marco Bortolotti / (Argentina) Mariano Kestelboim (semifinals)

== Draw ==
Key

- Q = Qualifier
- WC = Wild card
- LL = Lucky loser
- Alt = Alternate
- ITF = ITF entry
- PR = Protected ranking
- SR = Special ranking
- SE = Special exempt
- JE = Junior exempt
- JR = Junior Accelerator Programme entrant
- CO = College Accelerator Programme entrant
- NG = Next Gen Accelerator Program entrant
- w/o = Walkover
- r = Retired
- d = Defaulted

First round
1	(El Salvador) M Arévalo (Peru) S Galdós	w/o
(Argentina) Maximiliano Estévez (Argentina) JI Londero
(Argentina) F Coria (Ecuador) G Escobar	6	3	[10]
(Argentina) A Collarini (Chile) G Lama	2	6	[8]
3	(Brazil) F Neis (Brazil) C Zampieri	6	6
(Sweden) C Lindell (Brazil) Carlos Eduardo Severino	4	3
(Chile) C Saavedra (Chile) JC Sáez	4	4
WC	(Brazil) Rafael Camilo (Brazil) E Russi Assumpção	6	6
WC	(Brazil) JP Sorgi (Brazil) M Zormann	6	4	[10]
(Ecuador) E Gómez (Argentina) F Mena	2	6	[4]
WC	(Brazil) Marcelo Tebet Filho (Brazil) Fernando Yamacita	6^{2}	4
4	(Italy) M Bortolotti (Argentina) M Kestelboim	7^{7}	6
(Brazil) J Pereira (Brazil) Alexandre Tsuchiya	0	7	[11]
(Argentina) Juan Ignacio Galarza (Argentina) A Velotti	6	5	[9]
(Colombia) DE Galán (Brazil) A Miele	2	6^{4}
2	(Brazil) A Ghem (Brazil) J Souza	6	7^{7}

Quarterfinals
1	(El Salvador) M Arévalo (Peru) S Galdós	6	7^{9}
(Argentina) F Coria (Ecuador) G Escobar	3	6^{7}
3	(Brazil) F Neis (Brazil) C Zampieri	6	6
WC	(Brazil) R Camilo (Brazil) E Russi Assumpção	3	2
WC	(Brazil) JP Sorgi (Brazil) M Zormann	4	7^{9}	[7]
4	(Italy) M Bortolotti (Argentina) M Kestelboim	6	6^{7}	[10]
(Brazil) J Pereira (Brazil) A Tsuchiya	6	3	[12]
2	(Brazil) A Ghem (Brazil) J Souza	3	6	[10]

Semifinals
1	(El Salvador) M Arévalo (Peru) S Galdós
3	(Brazil) F Neis (Brazil) C Zampieri	w/o
4	(Italy) M Bortolotti (Argentina) M Kestelboim	6^{3}	1
(Brazil) J Pereira (Brazil) A Tsuchiya	7^{7}	6

Final
3	(Brazil) F Neis (Brazil) C Zampieri	6	7^{7}
(Brazil) J Pereira (Brazil) A Tsuchiya	4	6^{3}
