= 2017 Milo Open Cali – Singles =

Singles
- 2017 Milo Open Cali

Final
- Champion: (Argentina) Federico Delbonis
- Runner-up: (Brazil) Guilherme Clezar
- Score: 7–6^{(12–10)}, 7–5

Events
Singles	Doubles
- Milo Open Cali

Darian King was the defending champion, but chose not to defend his title.

Federico Delbonis won the title after defeating Guilherme Clezar 7–6^{(12–10)}, 7–5 in the final.

== Seeds ==
1. (Argentina) Horacio Zeballos (first round)
2. (Argentina) Federico Delbonis (champion)
3. (Dominican Republic) Víctor Estrella Burgos (first round)
4. (Spain) Roberto Carballés Baena (quarterfinals)
5. (Austria) Gerald Melzer (semifinals)
6. (Slovakia) Jozef Kovalík (first round)
7. (Spain) Ricardo Ojeda Lara (second round)
8. (Slovakia) Andrej Martin (semifinals)

== Draw ==
Key

- Q = Qualifier
- WC = Wild card
- LL = Lucky loser
- Alt = Alternate
- ITF = ITF entry
- PR = Protected ranking
- SR = Special ranking
- SE = Special exempt
- JE = Junior exempt
- JR = Junior Accelerator Programme entrant
- CO = College Accelerator Programme entrant
- NG = Next Gen Accelerator Program entrant
- w/o = Walkover
- r = Retired
- d = Defaulted

=== Finals ===
Semifinals
8	(Slovakia) Andrej Martin	6^{5}	3
(Brazil) Guilherme Clezar	7^{7}	6
5	(Austria) Gerald Melzer	1	2
2	(Argentina) Federico Delbonis	6	6

Final
(Brazil) Guilherme Clezar	6^{10}	5
2	(Argentina) Federico Delbonis	7^{12}	7

=== Top half ===
First round
1	(Argentina) H Zeballos	2	2
(Spain) J Munar	6	6
(Austria) M Linzer	6	6^{2}	1^{r}
(Portugal) J Domingues	2	7^{7}	2
WC	(Colombia) Luis Valero	5	1
(Argentina) F Coria	7	6
(France) M Janvier	6	4	3
8	(Slovakia) A Martin	2	6	6
3	(Dominican Republic) V Estrella Burgos	5	5
(Brazil) G Clezar	7	7
WC	(United States) Charles Force	6	3	3
(Chile) C Garín	4	6	6
(Spain) C Taberner	3	1
Q	(Argentina) JI Londero	6	6
WC	(Colombia) A González	3	6	6
6	(Slovakia) J Kovalík	6	2	3

Second round
(Spain) J Munar	6	6
(Portugal) J Domingues	1	2
(Argentina) F Coria	3	0
8	(Slovakia) A Martin	6	6
(Brazil) G Clezar	7	7^{7}
(Chile) C Garín	5	6^{2}
Q	(Argentina) JI Londero	4	6	3
WC	(Colombia) A González	6	4	6

Quarterfinals
(Spain) J Munar	3	6	1
8	(Slovakia) A Martin	6	3	6
(Brazil) G Clezar	6	6
WC	(Colombia) A González	4	1

Semifinals
8	(Slovakia) A Martin	6^{5}	3
(Brazil) G Clezar	7^{7}	6

=== Bottom half ===
First round
5	(Austria) G Melzer	6	6
(El Salvador) M Arévalo	1	2
(Portugal) G Oliveira	7^{7}	6
(Brazil) JP Sorgi	6^{5}	4
(Colombia) DE Galán	6	3	5
Q	(Spain) M Vilella Martínez	4	6	7
(Argentina) F Argüello	5	3
4	(Spain) R Carballés Baena	7	6
7	(Spain) R Ojeda Lara	1	6	6
WC	(Colombia) C Rodríguez	6	1	0
Q	(Spain) D Muñoz de la Nava	4	6	2
(Slovenia) B Rola	6	4	6
(Brazil) J Souza	3	7^{7}	6^{8}
(Spain) Í Cervantes	6	6^{5}	7^{10}
Q	(Chile) G Lama	4	6^{2}
2	(Argentina) F Delbonis	6	7^{7}

Second round
5	(Austria) G Melzer	6	6
(Portugal) G Oliveira	2	0
Q	(Spain) M Vilella Martínez	6^{4}	0
4	(Spain) R Carballés Baena	7^{7}	6
7	(Spain) R Ojeda Lara	1	3
(Slovenia) B Rola	6	6
(Spain) Í Cervantes	6^{4}	3
2	(Argentina) F Delbonis	7^{7}	6

Quarterfinals
5	(Austria) G Melzer	6	6
4	(Spain) R Carballés Baena	0	2
(Slovenia) B Rola	6	3	6^{4}
2	(Argentina) F Delbonis	3	6	7^{7}

Semifinals
5	(Austria) G Melzer	1	2
2	(Argentina) F Delbonis	6	6
