= 2016 São Paulo Challenger de Tênis – Singles =

Singles
- 2016 São Paulo Challenger de Tênis

Final
- Champion: (Chile) Gonzalo Lama
- Runner-up: (United States) Ernesto Escobedo
- Score: 6–2, 6–2

Events
Singles	Doubles
- São Paulo Challenger de Tênis

Guido Pella was the defending champion but chose not to participate.

Gonzalo Lama won the title, defeating Ernesto Escobedo 6–2, 6–2 in the final.

== Seeds ==
1. (Brazil) André Ghem (first round)
2. (Brazil) João Souza (second round)
3. (Brazil) Guilherme Clezar (first round, retired)
4. (Brazil) Thiago Monteiro (semifinals)
5. (Chile) Gonzalo Lama (champion)
6. (El Salvador) Marcelo Arévalo (quarterfinals)
7. (Sweden) Christian Lindell (semifinals)
8. (Argentina) Maximiliano Estévez (second round, retired)

== Draw ==
Key

- Q = Qualifier
- WC = Wild card
- LL = Lucky loser
- Alt = Alternate
- ITF = ITF entry
- PR = Protected ranking
- SR = Special ranking
- SE = Special exempt
- JE = Junior exempt
- JR = Junior Accelerator Programme entrant
- CO = College Accelerator Programme entrant
- NG = Next Gen Accelerator Program entrant
- w/o = Walkover
- r = Retired
- d = Defaulted

=== Finals ===
Semifinals
5	(Chile) Gonzalo Lama	5	6	6
4	(Brazil) Thiago Monteiro	7	4	2
7	(Sweden) Christian Lindell	5	6	3
(United States) Ernesto Escobedo	7	3	6

Final
5	(Chile) Gonzalo Lama	6	6
(United States) Ernesto Escobedo	2	2

=== Top half ===
First round
1	(Brazil) A Ghem	1	6	5
(Argentina) JI Londero	6	2	7
(Ecuador) G Escobar	7	3	6
(Argentina) A Collarini	5	6	4
(Brazil) Carlos Eduardo Severino	6	6
WC	(Brazil) G Décamps	3	2
(Colombia) DE Galán	2	3
5	(Chile) G Lama	6	6
4	(Brazil) T Monteiro	6	7
(Argentina) A Velotti	3	5
WC	(Brazil) Rafael Camilo	2	5
(Ecuador) E Gómez	6	7
(Italy) M Bortolotti	4	6	6
(Chile) JC Sáez	6	4	3
(Argentina) Juan Ignacio Galarza	6^{4}	3
8	(Argentina) Maximiliano Estévez	7^{7}	6

Second round
(Argentina) JI Londero	6	6
(Ecuador) G Escobar	1	4
(Brazil) CE Severino	3	2
5	(Chile) G Lama	6	6
4	(Brazil) T Monteiro	6	6
(Ecuador) E Gómez	4	3
(Italy) M Bortolotti	6	4	5
8	(Argentina) M Estévez	0	6	2^{r}

Quarterfinals
(Argentina) JI Londero	6	6^{6}	5
5	(Chile) G Lama	1	7^{8}	7
4	(Brazil) T Monteiro	6	3	6
(Italy) M Bortolotti	1	6	1

Semifinals
5	(Chile) G Lama	5	6	6
4	(Brazil) T Monteiro	7	4	2

=== Bottom half ===
First round
7	(Sweden) C Lindell	6	6
Q	(Brazil) JP Sorgi	1	2
WC	(Brazil) Wilson Leite	3	4
(Brazil) M Zormann	6	6
WC	(Brazil) FM Alves	2	3
(Brazil) J Pereira	6	6
(Argentina) F Coria	6	0
3	(Brazil) G Clezar	3	0^{r}
6	(El Salvador) M Arévalo	6	6
Q	(Brazil) R Hocevar	2	2
(Brazil) C Zampieri	7^{8}	6^{1}	6
Q	(Brazil) A Miele	6^{6}	7^{7}	2
(Argentina) F Mena	3	1
(United States) E Escobedo	6	6
Q	(Brazil) Alexandre Tsuchiya	2	0
2	(Brazil) J Souza	6	6

Second round
7	(Sweden) C Lindell	6	7
(Brazil) M Zormann	3	5
(Brazil) J Pereira	6	6
(Argentina) F Coria	3	2
6	(El Salvador) M Arévalo	7^{7}	7^{7}
(Brazil) C Zampieri	6^{4}	6^{4}
(United States) E Escobedo	6	2	7
2	(Brazil) J Souza	4	6	5

Quarterfinals
7	(Sweden) C Lindell	6	7^{7}
(Brazil) J Pereira	2	6^{4}
6	(El Salvador) M Arévalo	6^{8}	1
(United States) E Escobedo	7^{10}	6

Semifinals
7	(Sweden) C Lindell	5	6	3
(United States) E Escobedo	7	3	6
