= 2012 Seguros Bolívar Open Cali – Singles =

Singles
- 2012 Seguros Bolívar Open Cali

Final
- Champion: (Brazil) João Souza
- Runner-up: (Brazil) Thiago Alves
- Score: 6–2, 6–4

Events
Singles	Doubles
← 2011 ·	Seguros Bolívar Open Cali	· 2013 →

Alejandro Falla was the defending champion, but retired from his first round match.
João Souza won the title, defeating Thiago Alves 6–2, 6–4 in the final.

== Seeds ==
1. (Colombia) Santiago Giraldo (second round, withdrew because of peritonitis surgery)
2. (Colombia) Alejandro Falla (first round, retired)
3. (Spain) Rubén Ramírez Hidalgo (quarterfinals)
4. (United States) Wayne Odesnik (quarterfinals)
5. (Brazil) Thiago Alves (final)
6. (Argentina) Martín Alund (semifinals)
7. (Argentina) Guido Pella (quarterfinals)
8. (Brazil) João Souza (champion)

== Draw ==
=== Key ===
- Q = Qualifier
- WC = Wild card
- LL = Lucky loser
- Alt = Alternate
- ITF = ITF entry
- PR = Protected ranking
- SR = Special ranking
- SE = Special exempt
- JE = Junior exempt
- JR = Junior Accelerator Programme entrant
- CO = College Accelerator Programme entrant
- NG = Next Gen Accelerator Program entrant
- w/o = Walkover
- r = Retired
- d = Defaulted

=== Finals ===
Semifinals
Q	(Brazil) Fabiano de Paula	4	2
5	(Brazil) Thiago Alves	6	6
6	(Argentina) Martín Alund	1	4
8	(Brazil) João Souza	6	6

Final
5	(Brazil) Thiago Alves	2	4
8	(Brazil) João Souza	6	6

=== Top half ===
First round
1/WC	(Colombia) S Giraldo	6	6
Q	(Colombia) JS Gómez	3	0
Q	(Brazil) Fabiano de Paula	6	6
(Brazil) A Ghem	3	4
WC	(Argentina) F Bagnis	6	7^{9}
(Argentina) M González	2	6^{7}
Q	(Colombia) Sebastian Serrano	3	1
7	(Argentina) G Pella	6	6
4	(United States) W Odesnik	6	6
(Argentina) A Velotti	1	4
(Colombia) A González	2	6	6
(Brazil) R Hocevar	6	0	3
(Argentina) M Estévez	1	6	6
(Colombia) R Farah	6	4	3
Q	(United States) K Kim	0	1
5	(Brazil) T Alves	6	6

Second round
1/WC	(Colombia) S Giraldo
Q	(Brazil) F de Paula	w/o
WC	(Argentina) F Bagnis	6	2	2
7	(Argentina) G Pella	4	6	6
4	(United States) W Odesnik	4	6	6
(Colombia) A González	6	0	3
(Argentina) M Estévez	4	1
5	(Brazil) T Alves	6	6

Quarterfinals
Q	(Brazil) F de Paula	6	6
7	(Argentina) G Pella	1	1
4	(United States) W Odesnik	4	1
5	(Brazil) T Alves	6	6

Semifinals
Q	(Brazil) F de Paula	4	2
5	(Brazil) T Alves	6	6

=== Bottom half ===
First round
6	(Argentina) M Alund	6	6
(Uruguay) M Felder	3	1
(United States) A Collarini	6	1	2
(Argentina) M Trungelliti	2	6	6
(Argentina) P Galdón	6	3	5
(Brazil) G Clezar	4	6	7
(Colombia) JS Cabal	1	2
3	(Spain) R Ramírez Hidalgo	6	6
8	(Brazil) J Souza	6	6
WC	(Colombia) Felipe Mantilla	3	1
(Argentina) A Molteni	6	6
(Brazil) M Demoliner	1	4
(Argentina) D Junqueira	3	2
(Colombia) C Salamanca	6	6
WC	(Colombia) N Barrientos	6	1
2	(Colombia) A Falla	1	0^{r}

Second round
6	(Argentina) M Alund	6	6
(Argentina) M Trungelliti	3	2
(Brazil) G Clezar	5	1
3	(Spain) R Ramírez Hidalgo	7	6
8	(Brazil) J Souza	6	2	6
(Argentina) A Molteni	4	6	3
(Colombia) C Salamanca	6^{4}	7	1^{r}
WC	(Colombia) N Barrientos	7^{7}	5	3

Quarterfinals
6	(Argentina) M Alund	6	6
3	(Spain) R Ramírez Hidalgo	4	1
8	(Brazil) J Souza	6	6
WC	(Colombia) N Barrientos	3	2

Semifinals
6	(Argentina) M Alund	1	4
8	(Brazil) J Souza	6	6
