= 2013 Seguros Bolívar Open Cali – Singles =

Singles
- 2013 Seguros Bolívar Open Cali

Final
- Champion: (Argentina) Facundo Bagnis
- Runner-up: (Argentina) Facundo Argüello
- Score: 6–2, 4–6, 6–3

Events
Singles	Doubles
← 2012 ·	Seguros Bolívar Open Cali	· 2014 →

João Souza was the defending champion, but lost to eventual champion Facundo Bagnis.
Bagnis defeated compatriot Facundo Argüello 6–2, 4–6, 6–3 in the final.

== Seeds ==
1. (Brazil) João Souza (semifinals)
2. (Argentina) Guido Andreozzi (quarterfinals)
3. (Argentina) Agustín Velotti (quarterfinals)
4. (Argentina) Facundo Bagnis (champion)
5. (Argentina) Facundo Argüello (final)
6. (Brazil) Fabiano de Paula (first round)
7. (Brazil) Ricardo Hocevar (quarterfinals)
8. (Colombia) Carlos Salamanca (second round)

== Draw ==
=== Key ===
- Q = Qualifier
- WC = Wild card
- LL = Lucky loser
- Alt = Alternate
- ITF = ITF entry
- PR = Protected ranking
- SR = Special ranking
- SE = Special exempt
- JE = Junior exempt
- JR = Junior Accelerator Programme entrant
- CO = College Accelerator Programme entrant
- NG = Next Gen Accelerator Program entrant
- w/o = Walkover
- r = Retired
- d = Defaulted

=== Finals ===
Semifinals
1	(Brazil) João Souza	5	4
4	(Argentina) Facundo Bagnis	7	6
5	(Argentina) Facundo Argüello	6	3	6
(Argentina) Andrea Collarini	3	6	4

Final
4	(Argentina) Facundo Bagnis	2	6	6
5	(Argentina) Facundo Argüello	6	4	3

=== Top half ===
First round
1	(Brazil) J Souza	6	6
WC	(Ecuador) G Lapentti	3	1
Q	(Argentina) JI Londero	6	6
(Brazil) J Pereira	3	1
(Peru) M Echazú	7	3	2
Q	(Peru) D Beretta	5	6	6
Q	(Argentina) Sebastian Exequ Pini	3	2
7	(Brazil) R Hocevar	6	6
4	(Argentina) F Bagnis	6	6
(Bolivia) H Dellien	2	3
(Colombia) M Quintero	6^{3}	6	2
(Argentina) P Heras	7^{7}	4	6
(Brazil) T Turini	2	7^{10}	6
(United States) C Buchanan	6	6^{8}	4
(Argentina) A Molteni	6	3	6
6	(Brazil) F de Paula	4	6	4

Second round
1	(Brazil) J Souza	6	7
Q	(Argentina) JI Londero	3	5
Q	(Peru) D Beretta	6^{5}	7	1
7	(Brazil) R Hocevar	7^{7}	5	6
4	(Argentina) F Bagnis	7	6
(Argentina) P Heras	5	1
(Brazil) T Turini	6	7
(Argentina) A Molteni	3	5

Quarterfinals
1	(Brazil) J Souza	7	7^{7}
7	(Brazil) R Hocevar	5	6^{2}
4	(Argentina) F Bagnis	6	6
(Brazil) T Turini	1	2

Semifinals
1	(Brazil) J Souza	5	4
4	(Argentina) F Bagnis	7	6

=== Bottom half ===
First round
5	(Argentina) F Argüello	6	7^{7}
(Chile) G Rivera Aránguiz	3	6^{5}
(Brazil) L Kirche	6^{1}	6	6
(Argentina) F Coria	7^{7}	4	3
(Argentina) E Schwank	2	6	6
WC	(Colombia) E Struvay	6	3	4
(Italy) G Quinzi	3	2
3	(Argentina) A Velotti	6	6
8/WC	(Colombia) C Salamanca	7^{7}	6^{9}	6
(Barbados) D King	6^{4}	7^{11}	0
(Argentina) A Collarini	6	6
(Brazil) B Sant'Anna	2	0
WC	(Colombia) Alvaro Ochoa	1	2
Q	(Brazil) F Romboli	6	6
(Guatemala) C Diaz Figueroa	3	4
2	(Argentina) G Andreozzi	6	6

Second round
5	(Argentina) F Argüello	6	6
(Brazil) L Kirche	2	0
(Argentina) E Schwank	6^{3}	5
3	(Argentina) A Velotti	7^{7}	7
8/WC	(Colombia) C Salamanca	5	6	4
(Argentina) A Collarini	7	4	6
Q	(Brazil) F Romboli	3	6^{8}
2	(Argentina) G Andreozzi	6	7^{10}

Quarterfinals
5	(Argentina) F Argüello	6	3	6
3	(Argentina) A Velotti	3	6	4
(Argentina) A Collarini	6	5	7
2	(Argentina) G Andreozzi	3	7	5

Semifinals
5	(Argentina) F Argüello	6	3	6
(Argentina) A Collarini	3	6	4
