= 2013 Seguros Bolívar Open Cali – Doubles =

Doubles
- 2013 Seguros Bolívar Open Cali

Final
- Champions: (Argentina) Guido Andreozzi (Argentina) Eduardo Schwank
- Runners-up: (Colombia) Carlos Salamanca (Brazil) João Souza
- Score: 6-2, 6-4

Events
Singles	Doubles
← 2012 ·	Seguros Bolívar Open Cali	· 2014 →

Juan Sebastián Cabal and Robert Farah were the two-time defending champions, but chose not to compete.
The Argentinian team of Guido Andreozzi and Eduardo Schwank defeated Carlos Salamanca and João Souza 6-2, 6-4.

== Seeds ==
1. (Argentina) Facundo Bagnis / (Brazil) Fabiano de Paula (semifinals, withdrew with quadriceps pain)
2. (Colombia) Carlos Salamanca / (Brazil) João Souza (final)
3. (Argentina) Andrea Collarini / (Argentina) Andrés Molteni (quarterfinals)
4. (Argentina) Facundo Argüello / (Argentina) Agustín Velotti (quarterfinals)

== Draw ==
=== Key ===
- Q = Qualifier
- WC = Wild card
- LL = Lucky loser
- Alt = Alternate
- SE = Special exempt
- PR = Protected ranking
- ITF = ITF entry
- JE = Junior exempt
- w/o = Walkover
- r = Retired
- d = Defaulted
- SR = Special ranking

=== Draw ===
First round
1	(Argentina) F Bagnis (Brazil) F de Paula	6	6
WC	(United States) Sam Barnett (United States) J Witten	3	2
(Peru) D Beretta (Bolivia) H Dellien	7	6
(Colombia) M Quintero (Italy) G Quinzi	5	2
4	(Argentina) F Argüello (Argentina) A Velotti	6	4	[11]
(Brazil) B Sant'Anna (Brazil) T Turini	2	6	[9]
(Argentina) G Andreozzi (Argentina) E Schwank	6	6
WC	(United States) K King (Colombia) JC Spir	2	4
WC	(Venezuela) J De Armas (Ecuador) G Lapentti	6	6
(United States) C Buchanan (Brazil) F Romboli	4	2
(Barbados) D King (Australia) Chris Letcher	4	1
3	(Argentina) A Collarini (Argentina) A Molteni	6	6
(Colombia) Felipe Mantilla (Colombia) E Struvay	6	5	[7]
(Brazil) R Hocevar (Brazil) L Kirche	2	7	[10]
(Guatemala) C Diaz-Figueroa (Argentina) P Heras	4	4
2	(Colombia) C Salamanca (Brazil) J Souza	6	6

Quarterfinals
1	(Argentina) F Bagnis (Brazil) F de Paula	6	6
(Peru) D Beretta (Bolivia) H Dellien	1	1
4	(Argentina) F Argüello (Argentina) A Velotti	6	1	[7]
(Argentina) G Andreozzi (Argentina) E Schwank	1	6	[10]
(Venezuela) J De Armas (Ecuador) G Lapentti	6	1	[10]
3	(Argentina) A Collarini (Argentina) A Molteni	2	6	[7]
(Brazil) R Hocevar (Brazil) L Kirche	2	1
2	(Colombia) C Salamanca (Brazil) J Souza	6	6

Semifinals
1	(Argentina) F Bagnis (Brazil) F de Paula
(Argentina) G Andreozzi (Argentina) E Schwank	w/o
(Venezuela) J De Armas (Ecuador) G Lapentti	6^{5}	5
2	(Colombia) C Salamanca (Brazil) J Souza	7^{7}	7

Final
(Argentina) G Andreozzi (Argentina) E Schwank	6	6
2	(Colombia) C Salamanca (Brazil) J Souza	2	4
