= 2009 Seguros Bolívar Open Cali – Singles =

Singles
- 2009 Seguros Bolívar Open Cali

Final
- Champion: (Colombia) Alejandro Falla
- Runner-up: (Argentina) Horacio Zeballos
- Score: 6–3, 6–4

Events
Singles	Doubles
← 2008 ·	Seguros Bolívar Open Cali	· 2010 →

Marcos Daniel was the defending champion, but chose to not compete this year.
Alejandro Falla defeated Horacio Zeballos 6–3, 6–4 in the final.

== Seeds ==
1. (Argentina) Horacio Zeballos (final)
2. (Colombia) Santiago Giraldo (semifinals)
3. (Argentina) Sergio Roitman (second round)
4. (Argentina) Brian Dabul (second round)
5. (Argentina) Juan Ignacio Chela (semifinals)
6. (Argentina) Sebastián Decoud (second round)
7. (Colombia) Alejandro Falla (champion)
8. (Brazil) Ricardo Hocevar (second round)

== Draw ==
=== Key ===
- Q = Qualifier
- WC = Wild card
- LL = Lucky loser
- Alt = Alternate
- ITF = ITF entry
- PR = Protected ranking
- SR = Special ranking
- SE = Special exempt
- JE = Junior exempt
- JR = Junior Accelerator Programme entrant
- CO = College Accelerator Programme entrant
- NG = Next Gen Accelerator Program entrant
- w/o = Walkover
- r = Retired
- d = Defaulted

=== Final four ===
Semifinals
1	(Argentina) Horacio Zeballos	7	6
5	(Argentina) Juan Ignacio Chela	6^{3}	4
7	(Colombia) Alejandro Falla	6	6
2	(Colombia) Santiago Giraldo	4	4

Final
1	(Argentina) Horacio Zeballos	3	4
7	(Colombia) Alejandro Falla	6	6

=== Top half ===
First round
1	(Argentina) H Zeballos	6	6
Q	(Colombia) M Quintero	4	3
(Canada) P Polansky	6	6
(Brazil) E Gomes	1	3
Q	(Argentina) N Todero	6	3	2
(Brazil) R Mello	2	6	6
Q	(Colombia) S Serrano	1	2
6	(Argentina) S Decoud	6	6
3	(Argentina) S Roitman	6	6
WC	(Colombia) A Gómez	3	4
(Brazil) J Souza	6	6^{5}	5
WC	(Colombia) E Struvay	3	7	7
WC	(Slovenia) B Puc	4	3
(Italy) R Ghedin	6	6
Q	(Mexico) T Hank	1	2
5	(Argentina) JI Chela	6	6

Second round
1	(Argentina) H Zeballos	6	6
(Canada) P Polansky	3	3
(Brazil) R Mello	2	6	7
6	(Argentina) S Decoud	6	3	6^{5}
3	(Argentina) S Roitman	3	2
WC	(Colombia) E Struvay	6	6
(Italy) R Ghedin	2	2
5	(Argentina) JI Chela	6	6

Quarterfinals
1	(Argentina) H Zeballos	6	6
(Brazil) R Mello	4	4
WC	(Colombia) E Struvay	2	2
5	(Argentina) JI Chela	6	6

Semifinals
1	(Argentina) H Zeballos	7	6
5	(Argentina) JI Chela	6^{3}	4

=== Bottom half ===
First round
7	(Colombia) A Falla	6	3	6
(Colombia) A González	4	6	4
(Denmark) K Pless	6	6^{5}	4
(Germany) A Begemann	2	7	6
WC	(Colombia) JS Cabal	3	1
(Spain) C Poch-Gradin	6	6
(France) V Millot	4	4
4	(Argentina) B Dabul	6	6
8	(Brazil) R Hocevar	6	4	7
(Argentina) D Álvarez	2	6	6^{1}
(Colombia) C Salamanca	6	7
(Brazil) C Zampieri	3	6^{4}
(Argentina) M Zabaleta	6	6
(Portugal) L Tavares	4	4
(Mexico) S González	4	2
2	(Colombia) S Giraldo	6	6

Second round
7	(Colombia) A Falla	6	6
(Germany) A Begemann	4	4
(Spain) C Poch-Gradin	6	4	6
4	(Argentina) B Dabul	3	6	4
8	(Brazil) R Hocevar	4	4
(Colombia) C Salamanca	6	6
(Argentina) M Zabaleta	6	6^{2}	3
2	(Colombia) S Giraldo	4	7	6

Quarterfinals
7	(Colombia) A Falla	6	6
(Spain) C Poch-Gradin	2	3
(Colombia) C Salamanca	4	6^{7}
2	(Colombia) S Giraldo	6	7

Semifinals
7	(Colombia) A Falla	6	6
2	(Colombia) S Giraldo	4	4
