= 2014 Seguros Bolívar Open Cali =

- Date: 28 April – 4 May
- Edition: 7th
- Surface: Clay
- Location: Cali, Colombia

Champions

Singles
- (Chile) Gonzalo Lama

Doubles
- (Argentina) Facundo Bagnis / (Argentina) Eduardo Schwank
- Seguros Bolívar Open Cali

The 2014 Seguros Bolívar Open Cali was a professional tennis tournament played on clay courts. It was the seventh edition of the tournament which was part of the 2014 ATP Challenger Tour. It took place in Cali, Colombia between 28 April and 4 May 2014.

== Singles main-draw entrants ==
=== Seeds ===
Country	Player	Rank	Seed
ITA	Paolo Lorenzi	85	1
DOM	Víctor Estrella Burgos	101	2
AUS	James Duckworth	147	3
ARG	Facundo Bagnis	155	4
USA	Wayne Odesnik	163	5
FRA	Lucas Pouille	186	6
EGY	Mohamed Safwat	192	7
VEN	David Souto	208	8

=== Other entrants ===
The following players received wildcards into the singles main draw:

- (Colombia) Michael Quintero
- (Ecuador) Giovanni Lapentti
- (Colombia) Eduardo Struvay
- (Colombia) Juan Carlos Spir

The following players received entry from the qualifying draw:

- (Colombia) Gonzalo Escobar
- (Peru) Sergio Galdós
- (Japan) Ryusei Makiguchi
- (France) Mathias Bourgue

== Champions ==
=== Singles ===
- (Chile) Gonzalo Lama def. (Argentina) Marco Trungelliti, 6–3, 4–6, 6–3

=== Doubles ===
- (Argentina) Facundo Bagnis / (Argentina) Eduardo Schwank def. (Colombia) Nicolás Barrientos / (Colombia) Eduardo Struvay, 6–3, 6–3
