= 2009 Seguros Bolívar Open Cali – Doubles =

Tennis tournament results

Doubles
- 2009 Seguros Bolívar Open Cali

Final
- Champions: (Argentina) Sebastián Prieto (Argentina) Horacio Zeballos
- Runners-up: (Brazil) Ricardo Hocevar (Brazil) João Souza
- Score: 4–6, 6–3, [10–5]

Events
Singles	Doubles
← 2008 ·	Seguros Bolívar Open Cali	· 2010 →

Juan Sebastián Cabal and Alejandro Falla chose to defend their 2008 title. However, they withdrew before their first match against Eric Gomes and Carlos Salamanca.
Sebastián Prieto and Horacio Zeballos won in the final 4–6, 6–3, [10–5], against Ricardo Hocevar and João Souza.

== Seeds ==
1. (Argentina) Brian Dabul / (Argentina) Sergio Roitman (semifinals)
2. (Argentina) Sebastián Prieto / (Argentina) Horacio Zeballos (champions)
3. (Colombia) ~~Juan Sebastián Cabal~~ / (Colombia) ~~Alejandro Falla~~ (withdrew)
4. (Brazil) Ricardo Hocevar / (Brazil) João Souza (final)

== Draw ==
=== Key ===
- Q = Qualifier
- WC = Wild card
- LL = Lucky loser
- Alt = Alternate
- SE = Special exempt
- PR = Protected ranking
- ITF = ITF entry
- JE = Junior exempt
- w/o = Walkover
- r = Retired
- d = Defaulted
- SR = Special ranking

=== Draw ===
First round
1	(Argentina) B Dabul (Argentina) S Roitman	6	7
WC	(Slovenia) B Puc (Colombia) S Serrano	4	5
(Argentina) S Decoud (Mexico) S González	6	6
(Colombia) S Giraldo (Colombia) A González	4	2
4	(Brazil) R Hocevar (Brazil) J Souza	7	6^{2}	[10]
(Brazil) R Mello (Brazil) C Zampieri	5	7	[3]
(Italy) R Ghedin (Brazil) M Torres	6	6
WC	(Colombia) F Franco (Colombia) A Gómez	3	2
(Denmark) K Pless (Colombia) M Quintero	5	4
(Canada) P Polansky (Argentina) N Todero	7	6
(Brazil) E Gomes (Colombia) C Salamanca	6	6
ALT	(United States) J Correa (Mexico) T Hank	2	0
WC	(Colombia) J S Gómez (Colombia) S López	2	2
(Germany) A Begemann (Portugal) L Tavares	6	6
(Argentina) D Álvarez (Spain) C Poch-Gradin	3	2
2	(Argentina) S Prieto (Argentina) H Zeballos	6	6

Quarterfinals
1	(Argentina) B Dabul (Argentina) S Roitman	5	6	[10]
(Argentina) S Decoud (Mexico) S González	7	3	[6]
4	(Brazil) R Hocevar (Brazil) J Souza	3	7	[10]
(Italy) R Ghedin (Brazil) M Torres	6	6^{2}	[5]
(Canada) P Polansky (Argentina) N Todero	3	2
(Brazil) E Gomes (Colombia) C Salamanca	6	6
(Germany) A Begemann (Portugal) L Tavares	4	3
2	(Argentina) S Prieto (Argentina) H Zeballos	6	6

Semifinals
1	(Argentina) B Dabul (Argentina) S Roitman	6	2	[5]
4	(Brazil) R Hocevar (Brazil) J Souza	4	6	[10]
(Brazil) E Gomes (Colombia) C Salamanca	1	1
2	(Argentina) S Prieto (Argentina) H Zeballos	6	6

Finals
4	(Brazil) R Hocevar (Brazil) J Souza	6	3	[5]
2	(Argentina) S Prieto (Argentina) H Zeballos	4	6	[10]
