= 2017 Milo Open Cali – Doubles =

Tennis event

Doubles
- 2017 Milo Open Cali

Final
- Champions: (El Salvador) Marcelo Arévalo (Mexico) Miguel Ángel Reyes-Varela
- Runners-up: (Peru) Sergio Galdós (Brazil) Fabrício Neis
- Score: 6–3, 6–4

Events
Singles	Doubles
- Milo Open Cali

The doubles event at the 2017 Milo Open Cali was won by Marcelo Arévalo and Miguel Ángel Reyes-Varela. Nicolás Jarry and Hans Podlipnik-Castillo were the defending champions but chose not to defend their title and did not participate in the 2017 event. Arévalo and Reyes-Varela won the title after defeating Sergio Galdós and Fabrício Neis 6–3, 6–4 in the final.

== Seeds ==
1. (Peru) Sergio Galdós / (Brazil) Fabrício Neis (final)
2. (El Salvador) Marcelo Arévalo / (Mexico) Miguel Ángel Reyes-Varela (champions)
3. (Portugal) Gonçalo Oliveira / (Poland) Grzegorz Panfil (first round)
4. (Spain) Íñigo Cervantes / (Brazil) Fabiano de Paula (semifinals)

== Draw ==
Key

- Q = Qualifier
- WC = Wild card
- LL = Lucky loser
- Alt = Alternate
- ITF = ITF entry
- PR = Protected ranking
- SR = Special ranking
- SE = Special exempt
- JE = Junior exempt
- JR = Junior Accelerator Programme entrant
- CO = College Accelerator Programme entrant
- NG = Next Gen Accelerator Program entrant
- w/o = Walkover
- r = Retired
- d = Defaulted

First round
1	(Peru) S Galdós (Brazil) F Neis	4	6	[10]
(Spain) R Ojeda Lara (Spain) C Taberner	6	1	[5]
(Brazil) G Clezar (Argentina) JI Londero	6	0	[4]
(Spain) R Carballés Baena (Spain) C Gómez-Herrera	3	6	[10]
4	(Spain) Í Cervantes (Brazil) F de Paula	6	7
WC	(United States) Charles Force (Colombia) Sergio Luis Hernández Ramírez	2	5
PR	(Colombia) A González (Brazil) JP Sorgi	4	3
(Bolivia) H Dellien (Ecuador) R Quiroz	6	6
(Slovakia) J Kovalík (Slovakia) A Martin	4	6	[7]
(Argentina) F Agamenone (Brazil) F Romboli	6	3	[10]
(Dominican Republic) V Estrella Burgos (Spain) D Muñoz de la Nava	6	6
3	(Portugal) G Oliveira (Poland) G Panfil	3	1
WC	(Colombia) DE Galán (Colombia) C Salamanca	6	3	[10]
WC	(Colombia) Felipe Mantilla (Colombia) C Rodríguez	4	6	[8]
(Portugal) J Domingues (Slovenia) B Rola	4	2
2	(El Salvador) M Arévalo (Mexico) MÁ Reyes-Varela	6	6

Quarterfinals
1	(Peru) S Galdós (Brazil) F Neis	6	6
(Spain) R Carballés Baena (Spain) C Gómez-Herrera	3	2
4	(Spain) Í Cervantes (Brazil) F de Paula	6	6
(Bolivia) H Dellien (Ecuador) R Quiroz	3	4
(Argentina) F Agamenone (Brazil) F Romboli	5	6	[10]
(Dominican Republic) V Estrella Burgos (Spain) D Muñoz de la Nava	7	2	[5]
WC	(Colombia) DE Galán (Colombia) C Salamanca	4	3
2	(El Salvador) M Arévalo (Mexico) MÁ Reyes-Varela	6	6

Semifinals
1	(Peru) S Galdós (Brazil) F Neis	6	7^{7}
4	(Spain) Í Cervantes (Brazil) F de Paula	4	6^{5}
(Argentina) F Agamenone (Brazil) F Romboli	6^{4}	3
2	(El Salvador) M Arévalo (Mexico) MÁ Reyes-Varela	7^{7}	6

Final
1	(Peru) S Galdós (Brazil) F Neis	3	4
2	(El Salvador) M Arévalo (Mexico) MÁ Reyes-Varela	6	6
