= 2011 Seguros Bolívar Open Cali – Doubles =

Tennis tournament

Doubles
- 2011 Seguros Bolívar Open Cali

Final
- Champions: (Colombia) Juan Sebastián Cabal (Colombia) Robert Farah
- Runners-up: (Argentina) Facundo Bagnis (Argentina) Eduardo Schwank
- Score: 7–5, 6–2

Events
Singles	Doubles
← 2010 ·	Seguros Bolívar Open Cali	· 2012 →

Andre Begemann and Martin Emmrich were the defending champions, but decided not to participate.
Juan Sebastián Cabal and Robert Farah won the tournament after defeating Facundo Bagnis and Eduardo Schwank 7–5, 6–2 in the final.

== Seeds ==
1. (Colombia) Juan Sebastián Cabal / (Colombia) Robert Farah (champion)
2. (Argentina) Facundo Bagnis / (Argentina) Eduardo Schwank (final)
3. (Dominican Republic) Víctor Estrella / (Austria) Gerald Melzer (semifinals)
4. (Chile) Guillermo Rivera-Aránguiz / (Chile) Cristóbal Saavedra-Corvalán (semifinals)

== Draw ==
=== Key ===
- Q = Qualifier
- WC = Wild card
- LL = Lucky loser
- Alt = Alternate
- SE = Special exempt
- PR = Protected ranking
- ITF = ITF entry
- JE = Junior exempt
- w/o = Walkover
- r = Retired
- d = Defaulted
- SR = Special ranking

=== Draw ===
First round
1	(Colombia) JS Cabal (Colombia) R Farah	6	6
WC	(United States) Sam Barnett (United States) K Kim	1	3
(Colombia) A Falla (Colombia) A González	6	6
(Colombia) C Salamanca (Colombia) E Struvay	3	4
4	(Chile) G Rivera-Aránguiz (Chile) C Saavedra-Corvalán	6^{4}	6	[11]
(Argentina) S Decoud (Argentina) A Velotti	7^{7}	3	[9]
(Romania) C Gârd (United States) Greg Ouellette	6	5	[10]
WC	(Colombia) Felipe Escobar (Colombia) Steffen Zornosa	2	7	[4]
(Colombia) N Barrientos (Colombia) Sebastián Serrano	2	5
(Argentina) Cristián Benedetti (Chile) A García	6	7
(Mexico) D Garza (United States) E Nunez	6^{6}	1
3	(Dominican Republic) V Estrella (Austria) G Melzer	7^{8}	6
Alt	(Colombia) Pedro Pablo Ruiz (Colombia) Mateo Andres Ruiz Naranjo	4	1
(Colombia) JS Gómez (Italy) M Marrai	6	6
(Argentina) Juan Pablo Ortiz (Argentina) Marco Trungelliti	3	6	[8]
2	(Argentina) F Bagnis (Argentina) E Schwank	6	3	[10]

Quarterfinals
1	(Colombia) JS Cabal (Colombia) R Farah	6	6
(Colombia) A Falla (Colombia) A González	1	3
4	(Chile) G Rivera-Aránguiz (Chile) C Saavedra-Corvalán	6	7
(Romania) C Gârd (United States) G Ouellette	4	5
(Argentina) C Benedetti (Chile) A García	2	1
3	(Dominican Republic) V Estrella (Austria) G Melzer	6	6
(Colombia) JS Gómez (Italy) M Marrai	0	3
2	(Argentina) F Bagnis (Argentina) E Schwank	6	6

Semifinals
1	(Colombia) JS Cabal (Colombia) R Farah	6	6
4	(Chile) G Rivera-Aránguiz (Chile) C Saavedra-Corvalán	2	4
3	(Dominican Republic) V Estrella (Austria) G Melzer	1	2
2	(Argentina) F Bagnis (Argentina) E Schwank	6	6

Final
1	(Colombia) JS Cabal (Colombia) R Farah	7	6
2	(Argentina) F Bagnis (Argentina) E Schwank	5	2
