= 2014 Seguros Bolívar Open Cali – Doubles =

Doubles
- 2014 Seguros Bolívar Open Cali

Final
- Champions: (Argentina) Facundo Bagnis; (Argentina) Eduardo Schwank
- Runners-up: (Colombia) Nicolás Barrientos; (Colombia) Eduardo Struvay
- Score: 6–3, 6–3

Events
Singles	Doubles
- Seguros Bolívar Open Cali

Guido Andreozzi and Eduardo Schwank were the defending champions, but Guido Andreozzi decided not to compete alongside Schwank. Schwank played alongside Bagnis

Facundo Bagnis and Eduardo Schwank won the title, defeating Nicolás Barrientos and Eduardo Struvay in the final, 6–3, 6–3.

== Seeds ==
1. (Argentina) Facundo Bagnis / (Argentina) Eduardo Schwank (champions)
2. (Brazil) Marcelo Demoliner / (Colombia) Carlos Salamanca (semifinals)
3. (Uruguay) Ariel Behar / (Colombia) Juan Carlos Spir (quarterfinals)
4. (Peru) Sergio Galdós / (Venezuela) Roberto Maytín (quarterfinals)

== Draw ==
Key

- Q = Qualifier
- WC = Wild card
- LL = Lucky loser
- Alt = Alternate
- ITF = ITF entry
- PR = Protected ranking
- SR = Special ranking
- SE = Special exempt
- JE = Junior exempt
- JR = Junior Accelerator Programme entrant
- CO = College Accelerator Programme entrant
- NG = Next Gen Accelerator Program entrant
- w/o = Walkover
- r = Retired
- d = Defaulted

=== Draw ===
First round

Quarterfinals

Semifinals

Final

1
- (Argentina) F Bagnis
- (Argentina) E Schwank
3
6
[10]

(Puerto Rico) A Llompart
(Argentina) Mateo Nicolás Martínez
6
3
[1]

1
- (Argentina) F Bagnis
- (Argentina) E Schwank
6
6

- (Egypt) S Sabry
- (Egypt) M Safwat

WC
- (Colombia) J Chavarriaga
- (Colombia) M Quintero
1
3

WC
- (Colombia) Juan Chavarriaga
- (Colombia) M Quintero
w/o

1
- (Argentina) F Bagnis
- (Argentina) E Schwank
7^{7}
3
[10]

3
- (Uruguay) A Behar
- (Colombia) JC Spir
6
7

- (Peru) D Beretta
- (Dominican Republic) J Hernández
6^{5}
6
[6]

- (Brazil) Wilson Leite
- (Argentina) JP Paz
4
5

3
- (Uruguay) A Behar
- (Colombia) JC Spir
5
6^{5}

WC
- (Italy) Bruno Lorenzi
- (Italy) P Lorenzi
2
5

- (Peru) D Beretta
- (Dominican Republic) J Hernández
7
7^{7}

- (Peru) D Beretta
- (Dominican Republic) J Hernández
6
7

1
- (Argentina) F Bagnis
- (Argentina) E Schwank
6
6

- (Colombia) N Barrientos
- (Colombia) E Struvay
6
6

- (Colombia) N Barrientos
- (Colombia) E Struvay
3
3

- (Greece) T Angelinos
- (Belgium) Y Reuter
4
4

- (Colombia) N Barrientos
- (Colombia) E Struvay
6
2
[10]

- (Brazil) T Fernandes
- (Argentina) T Lipovšek Puches
1
3

4
- (Peru) S Galdós
- (Venezuela) R Maytín
4
6
[8]

4
- (Peru) S Galdós
- (Venezuela) R Maytín
6
6

- (Colombia) N Barrientos
- (Colombia) E Struvay
6
6

- (Ecuador) E Gómez
- (Chile) G Lama
6
3

2
- (Brazil) M Demoliner
- (Colombia) C Salamanca
4
4

- (Ecuador) I Endara
- (Venezuela) D Souto
3
4

- (Ecuador) E Gómez
- (Chile) G Lama
4
2

WC
(Ecuador) G Escobar
(Japan) Ryūsei Makiguchi
6
6^{4}
[5]

2
- (Brazil) M Demoliner
- (Colombia) C Salamanca
6
6

2
- (Brazil) M Demoliner
- (Colombia) C Salamanca
3
7^{7}
[10]
