= 2015 Seguros Bolívar Open Cali – Singles =

Singles
- 2015 Seguros Bolívar Open Cali

Final
- Champion: (Brazil) Fernando Romboli
- Runner-up: (Ecuador) Giovanni Lapentti
- Score: 4−6, 6−3, 6−2

Events
Singles	Doubles
- Seguros Bolívar Open Cali

Gonzalo Lama was the defending champion, but lost to Fernando Romboli in the quarterfinals.

Romboli won the tournament defeating Giovanni Lapentti in the final, 4−6, 6−3, 6−2.

== Seeds ==
1. (Slovenia) Blaž Rola (quarterfinals)
2. (Belgium) Niels Desein (second round)
3. (United States) Chase Buchanan (first round)
4. (Chile) Nicolás Jarry (semifinals)
5. (Argentina) Guido Andreozzi (second round)
6. (Sweden) Christian Lindell (first round)
7. (Argentina) Juan Ignacio Londero (second round)
8. (Dominican Republic) José Hernández (quarterfinals)

== Draw ==
Key

- Q = Qualifier
- WC = Wild card
- LL = Lucky loser
- Alt = Alternate
- ITF = ITF entry
- PR = Protected ranking
- SR = Special ranking
- SE = Special exempt
- JE = Junior exempt
- JR = Junior Accelerator Programme entrant
- CO = College Accelerator Programme entrant
- NG = Next Gen Accelerator Program entrant
- w/o = Walkover
- r = Retired
- d = Defaulted

=== Finals ===
Semifinals
(Ecuador) Giovanni Lapentti	4	6	7^{7}
(Colombia) Nicolás Barrientos	6	2	6^{5}
4	(Chile) Nicolás Jarry	6^{3}	6^{4}
Q	(Brazil) Fernando Romboli	7^{7}	7^{7}

Final
(Ecuador) Giovanni Lapentti	6	3	2
Q	(Brazil) Fernando Romboli	4	6	6

=== Top half ===
First round
1	(Slovenia) B Rola	6	6
(Colombia) JS Gómez	4	1
(Brazil) C Zampieri	7^{9}	6
WC	(Colombia) DE Galán	6^{7}	3
(France) A Michon	4	0
(Ecuador) G Lapentti	6	6
(United States) Connor Smith	1	4
7	(Argentina) JI Londero	6	6
3	(United States) C Buchanan	1	2
(El Salvador) M Arévalo	6	6
WC	(Colombia) José Carvajal	2	2
(France) G Mina	6	6
Q	(Brazil) Wilson Leite	1	4
(Argentina) N Kicker	6	6
(Colombia) N Barrientos	7^{7}	6
6	(Sweden) C Lindell	6^{1}	2

Second round
1	(Slovenia) B Rola	6	6
(Brazil) C Zampieri	3	2
(Ecuador) G Lapentti	4	6	7^{7}
7	(Argentina) JI Londero	6	1	6^{5}
(El Salvador) M Arévalo	6	6
(France) G Mina	4	2
(Argentina) N Kicker	4	6	5
(Colombia) N Barrientos	6	1	7

Quarterfinals
1	(Slovenia) B Rola	4	6	4
(Ecuador) G Lapentti	6	1	6
(El Salvador) M Arévalo	3	6	5
(Colombia) N Barrientos	6	4	7

Semifinals
(Ecuador) G Lapentti	4	6	7^{7}
(Colombia) N Barrientos	6	2	6^{5}

=== Bottom half ===
First round
8	(Dominican Republic) J Hernández	6	6
Q	(Ecuador) G Escobar	4	2
(United States) K King	7^{7}	6
WC	(Venezuela) D Souto	6^{4}	0
(Brazil) Henrique Cunha	3	6	6
(Ecuador) E Gómez	6	1	1
PR	(Colombia) C Salamanca	2	2
4	(Chile) N Jarry	6	6
5	(Argentina) G Andreozzi	6	6
(Brazil) R Dutra Silva	4	2
WC	(Colombia) Felipe Mantilla	1	1
(Chile) G Lama	6	6
Q	(Brazil) F Romboli	1	6	7
(Japan) Ryusei Makiguchi	6	3	5
Q	(Brazil) N Santos	1	2
2	(Belgium) N Desein	6	6

Second round
8	(Dominican Republic) J Hernández	4	6	6
(United States) K King	6	3	1
(Brazil) H Cunha	6^{4}	6^{5}
4	(Chile) N Jarry	7^{7}	7^{7}
5	(Argentina) G Andreozzi	6^{4}	5
(Chile) G Lama	7^{7}	7
Q	(Brazil) F Romboli	4	7^{8}	6
2	(Belgium) N Desein	6	6^{6}	2

Quarterfinals
8	(Dominican Republic) J Hernández	7	4	4
4	(Chile) N Jarry	5	6	6
(Chile) G Lama	3	7^{7}	3
Q	(Brazil) F Romboli	6	6^{2}	6

Semifinals
4	(Chile) N Jarry	6^{3}	6^{4}
Q	(Brazil) F Romboli	7^{7}	7^{7}
