= 2015 Seguros Bolívar Open Cali =

- Date: 5–10 May
- Edition: 8th
- Surface: Clay
- Location: Cali, Colombia

Champions

Singles
- (Brazil) Fernando Romboli

Doubles
- (Brazil) Marcelo Demoliner / (Mexico) Miguel Ángel Reyes-Varela
- Seguros Bolívar Open Cali

The 2015 Seguros Bolívar Open Cali was a professional tennis tournament played on clay courts. It was the eighth edition of the tournament which was part of the 2015 ATP Challenger Tour. It took place in Cali, Colombia between 4 and 10 May 2015.

== Singles main-draw entrants ==
=== Seeds ===
Country	Player	Rank	Seed
SLO	Blaž Rola	93	1
BEL	Niels Desein	161	2
USA	Chase Buchanan	163	3
CHI	Nicolás Jarry	183	4
ARG	Guido Andreozzi	204	5
SWE	Christian Lindell	222	6
ARG	Juan Ignacio Londero	235	7
DOM	José Hernández	240	8

- ^{1} Rankings as of April 27, 2015.

=== Other entrants ===
The following players received wildcards into the singles main draw:

- (Colombia) José Carvajal
- (Colombia) Daniel Elahi Galán
- (Colombia) Felipe Mantilla
- (Venezuela) David Souto

The following players used protected ranking to gain into the singles main draw:

- (Colombia) Carlos Salamanca

The following players received entry from the qualifying draw:

- (Ecuador) Gonzalo Escobar
- (Brazil) Fernando Romboli
- (Brazil) Wilson Leite
- (Brazil) Nicolas Santos

== Doubles main-draw entrants ==
=== Seeds ===
Country	Player	Country	Player	Rank^{1}	Seed
BRA	Marcelo Demoliner	MEX	Miguel Ángel Reyes-Varela	250	1
PHI	Ruben Gonzales	GBR	Darren Walsh	329	2
CHI	Nicolás Jarry	MEX	César Ramírez	334	3
USA	Kevin King	RSA	Dean O'Brien	344	4

- ^{1} Rankings as of April 27, 2015.

=== Other entrants ===
The following pairs received wildcards into the singles main draw:

- (Colombia) Juan Sebastián Gómez / (Argentina) Nicolás Kicker
- (Colombia) José Daniel Bendeck / (Colombia) Alejandro Gómez
- (Colombia) Carlos Salamanca / (Venezuela) David Souto

== Champions ==
=== Singles ===
- (Brazil) Fernando Romboli def. (Ecuador) Giovanni Lapentti, 4–6, 6–3, 6–2

=== Doubles ===
- (Brazil) Marcelo Demoliner / (Mexico) Miguel Ángel Reyes-Varela def. (Ecuador) Emilio Gómez / (Venezuela) Roberto Maytín, 6–1, 6–2
