= 2010 Seguros Bolívar Open Cali – Doubles =

Doubles
- 2010 Seguros Bolívar Open Cali

Final
- Champions: (Germany) Andre Begemann (Germany) Martin Emmrich
- Runners-up: (Germany) Gero Kretschmer (Germany) Alex Satschko
- Score: 6–4, 7–6(5)

Events
Singles	Doubles
← 2009 ·	Seguros Bolívar Open Cali	· 2011 →

Sebastián Prieto and Horacio Zeballos were the defending champions, but decided not to participate.
Andre Begemann and Martin Emmrich won in the German final, against Gero Kretschmer and Alex Satschko 6–4, 7–6(5).

== Seeds ==
1. (Brazil) Franco Ferreiro / (Brazil) André Sá (quarterfinals)
2. (Germany) Andre Begemann / (Germany) Martin Emmrich (champions)
3. (Australia) Kaden Hensel / (Australia) Adam Hubble (semifinals)
4. (Brazil) Ricardo Hocevar / (Brazil) Caio Zampieri (first round)

== Draw ==
=== Key ===
- Q = Qualifier
- WC = Wild card
- LL = Lucky loser
- Alt = Alternate
- SE = Special exempt
- PR = Protected ranking
- ITF = ITF entry
- JE = Junior exempt
- w/o = Walkover
- r = Retired
- d = Defaulted
- SR = Special ranking

=== Draw ===
First round
1	(Brazil) F Ferreiro (Brazil) A Sá	5	7	[10]
(Ecuador) JC Campozano (Colombia) A González	7	6^{2}	[5]
(Brazil) R Dutra da Silva (Brazil) J Silva	7	6
(Dominican Republic) V Estrella (Ecuador) G Lapentti	5	2
4	(Brazil) R Hocevar (Brazil) C Zampieri	4	7	[6]
(Germany) G Kretschmer (Germany) A Satschko	6	6^{5}	[10]
(Colombia) JS Cabal (Colombia) R Farah	6	6
(France) J Dasnières de Veigy (Italy) R Ghedin	0	3
WC	(Colombia) N Barrientos (Colombia) S Serrano	6	6
WC	(Brazil) R Gracie (Brazil) A Miele	1	1
(Brazil) M Daniel (Brazil) J Souza	4	3
3	(Australia) K Hensel (Australia) A Hubble	6	6
WC	(Colombia) JS Gómez (Colombia) C Salamanca	6	3	[8]
(Argentina) D Álvarez (Argentina) S Decoud	3	6	[10]
(United States) JP Fruttero (South Africa) I van der Merwe	6^{4}	6	[7]
2	(Germany) A Begemann (Germany) M Emmrich	7	2	[10]

Quarterfinals
1	(Brazil) F Ferreiro (Brazil) A Sá	4	6	[14]
(Brazil) R Dutra da Silva (Brazil) J Silva	6	1	[16]
(Germany) G Kretschmer (Germany) A Satschko	6	6
(Colombia) JS Cabal (Colombia) R Farah	4	3
WC	(Colombia) N Barrientos (Colombia) S Serrano	4	3
3	(Australia) K Hensel (Australia) A Hubble	6	6
(Argentina) D Álvarez (Argentina) S Decoud	3	3
2	(Germany) A Begemann (Germany) M Emmrich	6	6

Semifinals
(Brazil) R Dutra da Silva (Brazil) J Silva	3	6	[8]
(Germany) G Kretschmer (Germany) A Satschko	6	2	[10]
3	(Australia) K Hensel (Australia) A Hubble	6	3	[3]
2	(Germany) A Begemann (Germany) M Emmrich	3	6	[10]

Final
(Germany) G Kretschmer (Germany) A Satschko	4	6^{5}
2	(Germany) A Begemann (Germany) M Emmrich	6	7
