= 2015 Seguros Bolívar Open Cali – Doubles =

Doubles
- 2015 Seguros Bolívar Open Cali

Final
- Champion: (Brazil) Marcelo Demoliner (Mexico) Miguel Ángel Reyes-Varela
- Runner-up: (Ecuador) Emilio Gómez (Venezuela) Roberto Maytín
- Score: 6–1, 6–2

Events
Singles	Doubles
- Seguros Bolívar Open Cali

Facundo Bagnis and Eduardo Schwank were the defending champions, but they did not participate this year.

Marcelo Demoliner and Miguel Ángel Reyes-Varela won the title, defeating Emilio Gómez and Roberto Maytín in the final, 6–1, 6–2.

== Seeds ==
1. (Brazil) Marcelo Demoliner / (Mexico) Miguel Ángel Reyes-Varela (champions)
2. (Philippines) Ruben Gonzales / (United Kingdom) Darren Walsh (first round)
3. (Chile) Nicolás Jarry / (Mexico) César Ramírez (semifinals)
4. (United States) Kevin King / (South Africa) Dean O'Brien (first round, retired)

== Draw ==
Key

- Q = Qualifier
- WC = Wild card
- LL = Lucky loser
- Alt = Alternate
- ITF = ITF entry
- PR = Protected ranking
- SR = Special ranking
- SE = Special exempt
- JE = Junior exempt
- JR = Junior Accelerator Programme entrant
- CO = College Accelerator Programme entrant
- NG = Next Gen Accelerator Program entrant
- w/o = Walkover
- r = Retired
- d = Defaulted

First round
1	(Brazil) M Demoliner (Mexico) MÁ Reyes-Varela	6	7^{8}
WC	(Colombia) JS Gómez (Argentina) N Kicker	3	6^{6}
(Argentina) JI Londero (France) A Michon	6	1	[10]
(Peru) S Galdós (Dominican Republic) J Hernández	3	6	[5]
3	(Chile) N Jarry (Mexico) C Ramírez	6	3	[10]
WC	(Colombia) José Daniel Bendeck (Colombia) A Gómez	0	6	[4]
(Colombia) N Barrientos (Brazil) F Romboli	3	2
(Belgium) N Desein (United States) M Seeberger	6	6
(El Salvador) M Arévalo (Ecuador) G Lapentti	6	6
(Brazil) Henrique Cunha (Ecuador) G Escobar	1	4
(United States) C Buchanan (Slovenia) B Rola	2
4	(United States) K King (South Africa) D O'Brien	3^{r}
(Ecuador) E Gómez (Venezuela) R Maytín	6	7
(Chile) G Lama (United States) Connor Smith	4	5
WC	(Colombia) C Salamanca (Venezuela) D Souto	6	6
2	(Philippines) R Gonzales (United Kingdom) D Walsh	2	3

Quarterfinals
1	(Brazil) M Demoliner (Mexico) MÁ Reyes-Varela	6	6
(Argentina) JI Londero (France) A Michon	1	1
3	(Chile) N Jarry (Mexico) C Ramírez	3	6	[11]
(Belgium) N Desein (United States) M Seeberger	6	2	[9]
(El Salvador) M Arévalo (Ecuador) G Lapentti	6	6
(United States) C Buchanan (Slovenia) B Rola	4	3
(Ecuador) E Gómez (Venezuela) R Maytín	7^{7}	3	[10]
WC	(Colombia) C Salamanca (Venezuela) D Souto	6^{5}	6	[5]

Semifinals
1	(Brazil) M Demoliner (Mexico) MÁ Reyes-Varela	7^{7}	3	[10]
3	(Chile) N Jarry (Mexico) C Ramírez	6^{4}	6	[6]
(El Salvador) M Arévalo (Ecuador) G Lapentti	3	2
(Ecuador) E Gómez (Venezuela) R Maytín	6	6

Final
1	(Brazil) M Demoliner (Mexico) MÁ Reyes-Varela	6	6
(Ecuador) E Gómez (Venezuela) R Maytín	1	2
