= 2014 Seguros Bolívar Open Cali – Singles =

Singles
- 2014 Seguros Bolívar Open Cali

Final
- Champion: (Chile) Gonzalo Lama
- Runner-up: (Argentina) Marco Trungelliti
- Score: 6–3, 4–6, 6–3

Events
Singles	Doubles
- Seguros Bolívar Open Cali

Facundo Bagnis was the defending champion, but lost in the semifinals to Marco Trungelliti.

Gonzalo Lama won the title, defeating Trungelliti 6–3, 4–6, 6–3 in the final.

== Seeds ==
1. (Italy) Paolo Lorenzi (quarterfinals)
2. (Dominican Republic) Víctor Estrella Burgos (second round)
3. (Australia) James Duckworth (quarterfinals)
4. (Argentina) Facundo Bagnis (semifinals)
5. (United States) Wayne Odesnik (first round, retired)
6. (France) Lucas Pouille (first round)
7. (Egypt) Mohamed Safwat (first round)
8. (Venezuela) David Souto (quarterfinals)

== Draw ==
Key

- Q = Qualifier
- WC = Wild card
- LL = Lucky loser
- Alt = Alternate
- ITF = ITF entry
- PR = Protected ranking
- SR = Special ranking
- SE = Special exempt
- JE = Junior exempt
- JR = Junior Accelerator Programme entrant
- CO = College Accelerator Programme entrant
- NG = Next Gen Accelerator Program entrant
- w/o = Walkover
- r = Retired
- d = Defaulted

=== Finals ===
Semifinals
(Argentina) Marco Trungelliti	7^{9}	7^{7}
4	(Argentina) Facundo Bagnis	6^{7}	6^{5}
(Belgium) Arthur De Greef	3	3
(Chile) Gonzalo Lama	6	6

Final
(Argentina) Marco Trungelliti	3	6	3
(Chile) Gonzalo Lama	6	4	6

=== Top half ===
First round
1	(Italy) P Lorenzi	6	6
(Argentina) E Schwank	3	3
(Austria) D Novak	2	1
(Greece) T Angelinos	6	6
WC	(Colombia) M Quintero	4	6	4
(Brazil) Wilson Leite	6	1	6
(Argentina) M Trungelliti	7^{7}	3	7^{7}
6	(France) L Pouille	6^{3}	6	6^{5}
4	(Argentina) F Bagnis	6	6
(Ecuador) E Gómez	4	2
(Dominican Republic) J Hernández	5	1
(Colombia) N Barrientos	7	6
(Belgium) Y Reuter	6	6
Q	(Ecuador) G Escobar	4	0
WC	(Ecuador) G Lapentti	3	4
8	(Venezuela) D Souto	6	6

Second round
1	(Italy) P Lorenzi	6	6
(Greece) T Angelinos	2	2
(Brazil) W Leite	0	2
(Argentina) M Trungelliti	6	6
4	(Argentina) F Bagnis	6	6
(Colombia) N Barrientos	2	3
(Belgium) Y Reuter	4	6	6^{5}
8	(Venezuela) D Souto	6	3	7^{7}

Quarterfinals
1	(Italy) P Lorenzi	6^{5}	6^{4}
(Argentina) M Trungelliti	7^{7}	7^{7}
4	(Argentina) F Bagnis	6	6
8	(Venezuela) D Souto	4	3

Semifinals
(Argentina) M Trungelliti	7^{9}	7^{7}
4	(Argentina) F Bagnis	6^{7}	6^{5}

=== Bottom half ===
First round
5	(United States) W Odesnik	6	6^{5}	0^{r}
(Belgium) A De Greef	3	7^{7}	3
(Colombia) C Salamanca	6	3	7
(Slovenia) J Semrajc	4	6	5
Q	(Peru) S Galdós	1	6	3
(Brazil) J Pereira	6	1	6
(Ecuador) I Endara	3	6^{2}
3	(Australia) J Duckworth	6	7^{7}
7	(Egypt) M Safwat	3	1^{r}
WC	(Colombia) E Struvay	6	4
(Egypt) S Sabry	6	7
Q	(Japan) Ryūsei Makiguchi	3	5
Q	(France) M Bourgue	4	4
(Chile) G Lama	6	6
WC	(Colombia) JC Spir	2	4
2	(Dominican Republic) VE Burgos	6	6

Second round
(Belgium) A De Greef	2	6	6
(Colombia) C Salamanca	6	2	3
(Brazil) J Pereira	3	2
3	(Australia) J Duckworth	6	6
WC	(Colombia) E Struvay	5	6	3
(Egypt) S Sabry	7	4	6
(Chile) G Lama	6	6
2	(Dominican Republic) VE Burgos	4	1

Quarterfinals
(Belgium) A De Greef	6	6
3	(Australia) J Duckworth	4	4
(Egypt) S Sabry	3	4
(Chile) G Lama	6	6

Semifinals
(Belgium) A De Greef	3	3
(Chile) G Lama	6	6
