= 2010 Seguros Bolívar Open Cali – Singles =

Singles
- 2010 Seguros Bolívar Open Cali

Final
- Champion: (Colombia) Carlos Salamanca
- Runner-up: (Brazil) Júlio Silva
- Score: 7–5, 3–6, 6–3

Events
Singles	Doubles
- Seguros Bolívar Open Cali

Alejandro Falla was the defending champion, but chose to compete in ATP 250 tournament in Kuala Lumpur instead.
Carlos Salamanca defeated Júlio Silva 7–5, 3–6, 6–3 in the final.

== Seeds ==
1. (Paraguay) Ramón Delgado (first round)
2. (Brazil) João Souza (first round)
3. (Colombia) Carlos Salamanca (champion)
4. (Brazil) Marcos Daniel (first round)
5. (South Africa) Izak van der Merwe (first round)
6. (Brazil) Rogério Dutra da Silva (second round)
7. (Germany) Andre Begemann (first round)
8. (Brazil) Caio Zampieri (second round)

== Draw ==
Key

- Q = Qualifier
- WC = Wild card
- LL = Lucky loser
- Alt = Alternate
- ITF = ITF entry
- PR = Protected ranking
- SR = Special ranking
- SE = Special exempt
- JE = Junior exempt
- JR = Junior Accelerator Programme entrant
- CO = College Accelerator Programme entrant
- NG = Next Gen Accelerator Program entrant
- w/o = Walkover
- r = Retired
- d = Defaulted

=== Finals ===
Semifinals
(Dominican Republic) Víctor Estrella	3	4
3	(Colombia) Carlos Salamanca	6	6
(Brazil) Júlio Silva	6	6
(Colombia) Juan Sebastián Cabal	3	4

Final
3	(Colombia) Carlos Salamanca	7	3	6
(Brazil) Júlio Silva	5	6	3

=== Top half ===
First round
1	(Paraguay) R Delgado	6^{6}	6	0
(Argentina) S Decoud	7	4	6
WC	(Colombia) JS Gómez	5	1
(Argentina) F Bagnis	7	6
(Dominican Republic) V Estrella	6	6
(Chile) P Capdeville	3	4
(Argentina) J Acasuso	1	6	7
5	(South Africa) I van der Merwe	6	4	5
3	(Colombia) C Salamanca	6	6
Q	(Brazil) J Pereira	2	2
Q	(Brazil) L Kirche	6	6
WC	(Brazil) R Gracie	1	0
(Colombia) R Farah	6	4	7
Q	(South Korea) D Yoo	4	6	6^{5}
(Germany) G Kretschmer	3	5
6	(Brazil) R Dutra da Silva	6	7

Second round
(Argentina) S Decoud	0	6	3
(Argentina) F Bagnis	6	3	6
(Dominican Republic) V Estrella	6	4	6
(Argentina) J Acasuso	3	6	4
3	(Colombia) C Salamanca	6	3	7
Q	(Brazil) L Kirche	1	6	6^{5}
(Colombia) R Farah	7	2	6
6	(Brazil) R Dutra da Silva	6	6	2

Quarterfinals
(Argentina) F Bagnis	1	1
(Dominican Republic) V Estrella	6	6
3	(Colombia) C Salamanca	6	6
(Colombia) R Farah	4	0

Semifinals
(Dominican Republic) V Estrella	3	4
3	(Colombia) C Salamanca	6	6

=== Bottom half ===
First round
8	(Brazil) C Zampieri	6	1	6
(Brazil) R Hocevar	1	6	3
(France) J Dasnières de Veigy	6^{4}	0
(Brazil) J Silva	7	6
Q	(Ecuador) JC Campozano	3	6	4
(United States) G Ouellette	6	3	6
(Colombia) A González	7	6
4	(Brazil) M Daniel	6^{5}	4
7	(Germany) A Begemann	3	1
(Colombia) JS Cabal	6	6
WC	(Colombia) E Struvay	2	3
(Italy) R Ghedin	6	6
PR	(Argentina) D Hartfield	4	2	r
(Argentina) P Galdón	6	4
WC	(Ecuador) G Lapentti	6	6
2	(Brazil) J Souza	3	0

Second round
8	(Brazil) C Zampieri	6	4	0
(Brazil) J Silva	2	6	6
(United States) G Ouellette	4	6	1
(Colombia) A González	6	4	6
(Colombia) JS Cabal	6	6
(Italy) R Ghedin	1	4
(Argentina) P Galdón	3	7	3
WC	(Ecuador) G Lapentti	6	6	1^{r}

Quarterfinals
(Brazil) J Silva	6	4	7
(Colombia) A González	4	6	6^{6}
(Colombia) JS Cabal	6	6
(Argentina) P Galdón	3	4

Semifinals
(Brazil) J Silva	6	6
(Colombia) JS Cabal	3	4
