= Guilherme Clezar =

Brazilian tennis player

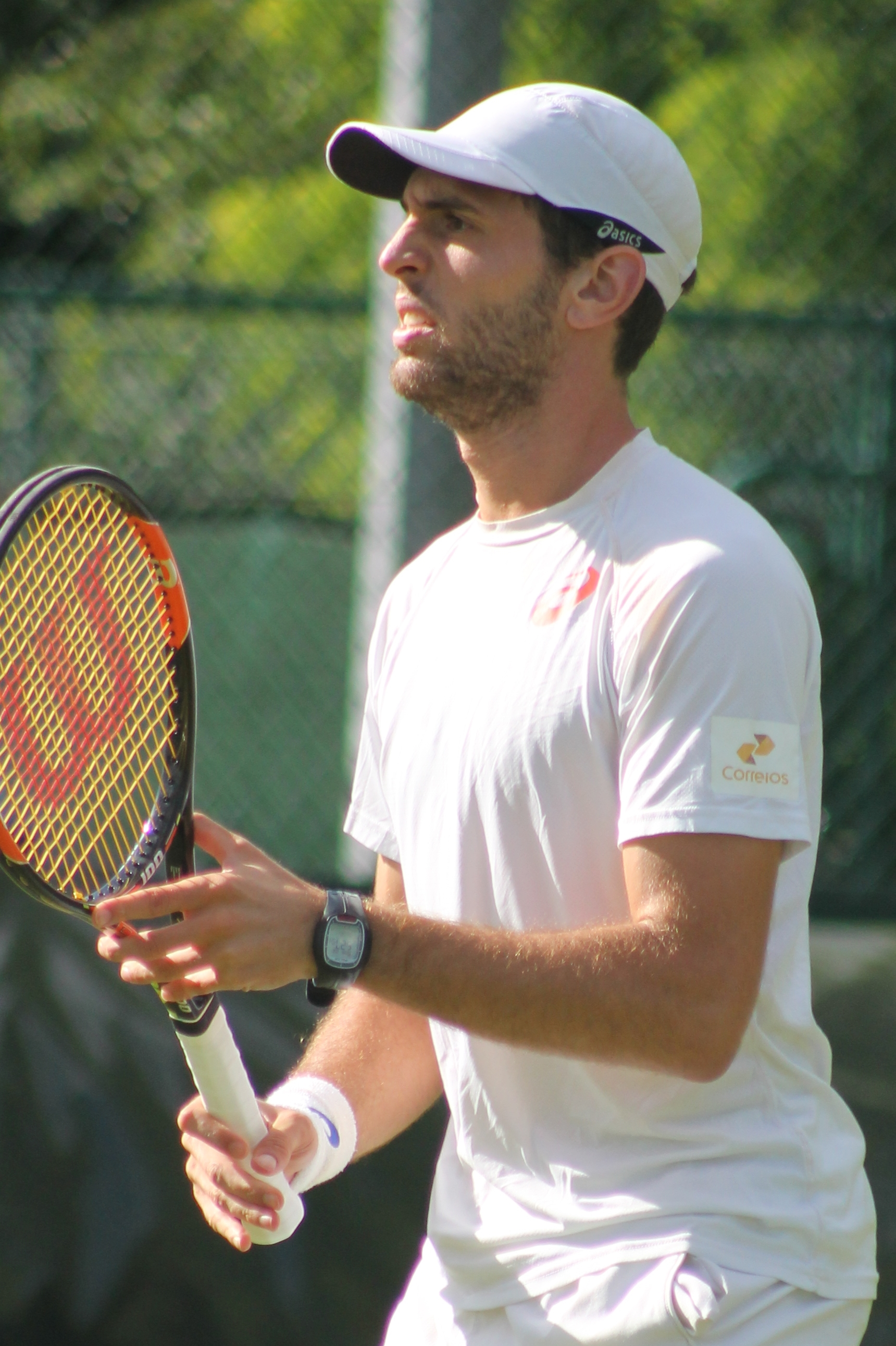
- Clezar at the 2015 Wimbledon Championships
- Country (sports): Brazil
- Residence: Porto Alegre, Brazil
- Born: 31 December 1992 (age 33) Porto Alegre, Brazil
- Height: 1.80 m (5 ft 11 in)
- Turned pro: 2009
- Retired: 2024
- Plays: Right-handed (two-handed backhand)
- Prize money: US $625,726

Singles
- Career record: 1–14 (ATP Tour level, Grand Slam level, and Davis Cup)
- Career titles: 0
- Highest ranking: No. 153 (3 August 2015)

Grand Slam singles results
- Australian Open: Q2 (2017)
- French Open: Q3 (2015)
- Wimbledon: Q1 (2013, 2015, 2016, 2018)
- US Open: 1R (2016)

Doubles
- Career record: 0–4 (ATP Tour level, Grand Slam level, and Davis Cup)
- Career titles: 0
- Highest ranking: No. 171 (15 August 2016)

Guilherme Sarti Clezar (pronounced Clézar; born 31 December 1992), is a Brazilian former tennis player. Clezar plays mainly in ATP Challenger Tour events. He has a career high ATP singles ranking of World No. 153 achieved on 3 August 2015 and a doubles ranking of No. 171 achieved on 15 August 2016. He played also in several ATP 250 events, including the 2011 Brasil Open.

Clezar retired in both singles and doubles in the 2024 Brasil Tennis Open, in which he partnered with Fabrício Neis.

== Career finals ==
=== Singles: 7 (2–5) ===
Legend
ATP Challenger Tour Finals (0–1)
ATP Challenger Tour (2–4)

Outcome	No.	Date	Tournament	Surface	Opponent	Score
Winner	1.	May 12, 2012	Rio Quente, Brazil	Hard	(Chile) Paul Capdeville	7–6^{(7–4)}, 6–3
Winner	2.	September 22, 2013	Campinas, Brazil	Clay	(Argentina) Facundo Bagnis	6–4, 6–4
Runner-up	1.	November 23, 2014	São Paulo, Brazil	Clay (i)	(Argentina) Diego Schwartzman	2–6, 3–6
Runner-up	2.	March 15, 2015	Santiago, Chile	Clay	(Argentina) Facundo Bagnis	2–6, 7–5, 2–6
Runner-up	3.	January 24, 2016	Rio de Janeiro, Brazil	Clay	(Argentina) Facundo Bagnis	4–6, 6–4, 2–6
Runner-up	4.	August 6, 2017	Liberec, Czech Republic	Clay	(Portugal) Pedro Sousa	4–6, 7–5, 2–6
Runner-up	5.	October 21, 2017	Cali, Colombia	Clay	(Argentina) Federico Delbonis	6–7^{(10-12)}, 5–7
