= Milo Open Cali =

Defunct tennis tournament
- Location: Cali; Colombia
- Venue: Club Campestre de Cali
- Category: ATP Challenger Series
- Surface: Clay / Outdoors
- Draw: 32S/32Q/16D
- Prize money: $50,000+H

The Milo Open Cali (formerly Seguros Bolívar Open Cali) was a tennis tournament held in Cali, Colombia. The event is part of the ATP Challenger Tour and was played on outdoor clay courts.

== Past finals ==
=== Singles ===
| Year | Champion | Runner-up | Score |
|---|---|---|---|
| 2017 | (Argentina) Federico Delbonis | (Brazil) Guilherme Clezar | 7–6^{(12–10)}, 7–5 |
| 2016 | (Barbados) Darian King | (Dominican Republic) Víctor Estrella Burgos | 5–7, 6–4, 7–5 |
| 2015 | (Brazil) Fernando Romboli | (Ecuador) Giovanni Lapentti | 4–6, 6–3, 6–2 |
| 2014 | (Chile) Gonzalo Lama | (Argentina) Marco Trungelliti | 6–3, 4–6, 6–3 |
| 2013 | (Argentina) Facundo Bagnis | (Argentina) Facundo Argüello | 2–6, 6–4, 6–3 |
| 2012 | (Brazil) João Souza | (Brazil) Thiago Alves | 6–2, 6–4 |
| 2011 | (Colombia) Alejandro Falla (2) | (Argentina) Eduardo Schwank | 6–4, 6–3 |
| 2010 | (Colombia) Carlos Salamanca | (Brazil) Júlio Silva | 7–5, 3–6, 6–3 |
| 2009 | (Colombia) Alejandro Falla | (Argentina) Horacio Zeballos | 6–3, 6–4 |
| 2008 | (Brazil) Marcos Daniel | (Argentina) Leonardo Mayer | 6–2, ret. |

=== Doubles ===
| Year | Champion | Runner-up | Score |
|---|---|---|---|
| 2017 | (El Salvador) Marcelo Arévalo (Mexico) Miguel Ángel Reyes-Varela (2) | (Peru) Sergio Galdós (Brazil) Fabrício Neis | 6–3, 6–4 |
| 2016 | (Chile) Nicolás Jarry (Chile) Hans Podlipnik | (Italy) Erik Crepaldi (Brazil) Daniel Dutra da Silva | 6–1, 7–6^{(8–6)} |
| 2015 | (Brazil) Marcelo Demoliner (Mexico) Miguel Ángel Reyes-Varela | (Ecuador) Emilio Gómez (Venezuela) Roberto Maytín | 6–1, 6–2 |
| 2014 | (Argentina) Facundo Bagnis (Argentina) Eduardo Schwank (2) | (Colombia) Nicolás Barrientos (Colombia) Eduardo Struvay | 6–3, 6–3 |
| 2013 | (Argentina) Guido Andreozzi (Argentina) Eduardo Schwank | (Colombia) Carlos Salamanca (Brazil) João Souza | 6–2, 6–4 |
| 2012 | (Colombia) Juan Sebastián Cabal (3) (Colombia) Robert Farah (2) | (Brazil) Marcelo Demoliner (Brazil) João Souza | 6–3, 7–6^{(7–4)} |
| 2011 | (Colombia) Juan Sebastián Cabal (2) (Colombia) Robert Farah | (Argentina) Facundo Bagnis (Argentina) Eduardo Schwank | 7–5, 6–2 |
| 2010 | (Germany) Andre Begemann (Germany) Martin Emmrich | (Germany) Gero Kretschmer (Germany) Alex Satschko | 6–4, 7–6^{(7–5)} |
| 2009 | (Argentina) Sebastián Prieto (Argentina) Horacio Zeballos | (Brazil) Ricardo Hocevar (Brazil) João Souza | 4–6, 6–3, [10–5] |
| 2008 | (Colombia) Juan Sebastián Cabal (Colombia) Alejandro Falla | (Argentina) Brian Dabul (Argentina) Horacio Zeballos | 7–6, 6–3 |
