= Gonzalo Lama =

Chilean tennis player (born 1993)

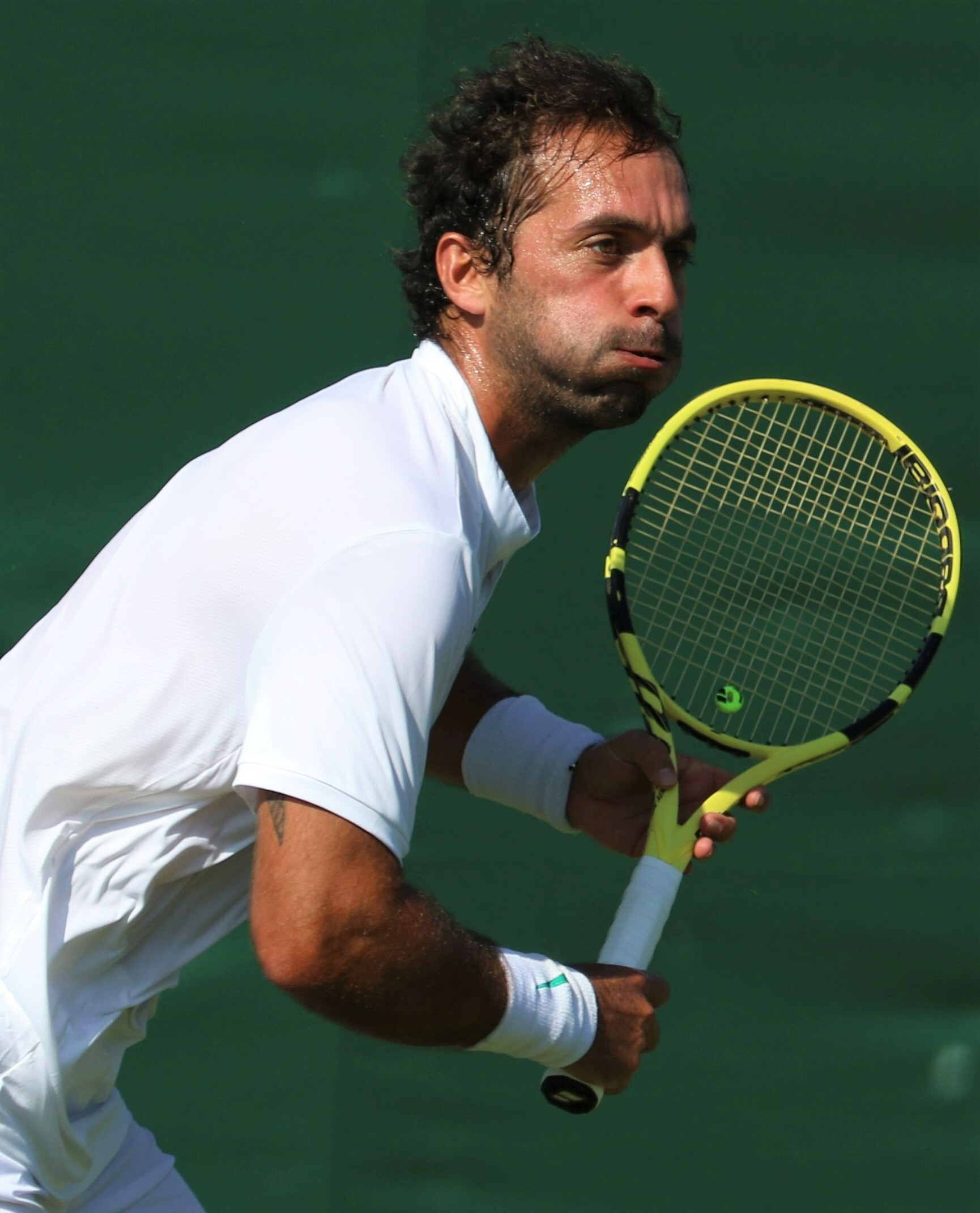
- Lama at the 2022 Wimbledon Championships
- Country (sports): Chile
- Residence: Santiago de Chile, Chile
- Born: 27 April 1993 (age 33) Santiago, Chile
- Height: 1.80 m (5 ft 11 in)
- Turned pro: 2011
- Retired: 2024
- Plays: Right-handed (two-handed backhand)
- Coach: Cristóbal Saavedra Corvalán
- Prize money: US $294,060

Singles
- Career record: 8–7 (at ATP Tour level, Grand Slam level and in Davis Cup)
- Career titles: 0
- Highest ranking: No. 160 (20 June 2016)

Grand Slam singles results
- Australian Open: Q1 (2015)
- French Open: Q1 (2016)
- Wimbledon: Q1 (2022)
- US Open: Q1 (2014, 2016)

Doubles
- Career record: 1–5 (at ATP Tour level, Grand Slam level and in Davis Cup)
- Career titles: 0
- Highest ranking: No. 367 (3 April 2017)
Medal record
Representing Chile
Men's tennis
South American Games
Bronze medal – third place	2018 Cochabamba	Mixed doubles

Gonzalo Andrés Lama Feliu (Latin American Spanish: [ɡonˈsalo ˈlama]; born 27 April 1993 in Santiago) is a former Chilean professional tennis player. He has a career-high ATP singles ranking of No. 160 achieved on 20 June 2016 and a doubles ranking of No. 367 achieved on 3 April 2017. He won two Challengers (Cali and São Paulo), along with fourteen futures, twelve in singles and two in doubles.

== Career ==
During his career, Lama defeated former top 100 players such as Santiago Giraldo, Robin Haase, Alejandro González, Víctor Estrella, Pere Riba, Boris Pašanski, Blaž Kavčič, Potito Starace and Roberto Carballés Baena. He announced his retirement on 29 January 2024, at the age of 30, after a knee injury.

== Finals ==
=== Singles ===
Legend
ATP Challengers (2–2)
ITF Futures/World Tennis Tour (14–9)

Result	W–L	Date	Tournament	Tier	Surface	Opponent	Score
Loss	0–1	Oct 2012	Chile F9	Futures	Clay	(Italy) Stefano Travaglia	3–6, 2–6
Loss	0–2	Apr 2013	Chile F1	Futures	Clay	(Bolivia) Hugo Dellien	4–6, 7–6^{(7–5)}, 6–7^{(2–7)}
Win	1–2	Apr 2013	Chile F2	Futures	Clay	(Brazil) Wilson Leite	5–7, 7–6^{(10–8)}, 6–2
Win	2–2	Oct 2013	Chile F5	Futures	Clay	(Argentina) Facundo Mena	6–2, 6–1
Loss	2–3	Nov 2013	Chile F8	Futures	Clay	(Chile) Hans Podlipnik	3–6, 2–6
Win	3–3	Nov 2013	Chile F9	Futures	Clay	(Argentina) Andrés Molteni	6–1, 6–4
Win	4–3	Mar 2014	Chile F1	Futures	Clay	(Chile) Nicolás Jarry	6–1, 6–2
Loss	4–4	Mar 2014	Chile F2	Futures	Clay	(Chile) Hans Podlipnik	3–6, 6–2, 6–7^{(2–7)}
Win	5–4	May 2014	Cali	Challenger	Clay	(Argentina) Marco Trungelliti	6–3, 4–6, 6–3
Win	6–4	Aug 2015	Finland F2	Futures	Clay	(Republic of Ireland) Sam Barry	6–2, 6–3
Win	7–4	Aug 2015	Belgium F12	Futures	Clay	(Germany) Marvin Netuschil	6–3, 7–6^{(9–7)}
Loss	7–5	Oct 2015	Medellín	Challenger	Clay	(Italy) Paolo Lorenzi	6–7^{(3–7)}, 0–2 ret.
Win	8–5	Oct 2015	Chile F7	Futures	Clay	(Germany) Nico Matic	6–3, 6–4
Win	9–5	Dec 2015	Chile F9	Futures	Clay	(Argentina) Tomás Lipovšek Puches	7–5, 6–3
Win	10–5	Apr 2016	São Paulo	Challenger	Clay	(United States) Ernesto Escobedo	6–2, 6–2
Loss	10–6	Nov 2017	Chile F1	Futures	Clay	(Argentina) Mariano Kestelboim	6–7^{(11–13)}, 6–3, 0–2, ret.
Loss	10–7	Sep 2018	Spain F28	Futures	Clay	(Italy) Raúl Brancaccio	3–6, 6–3, 1–6
Loss	10–8	Sep 2018	Spain F29	Futures	Clay	(Spain) Álvaro López San Martín	6–7^{(2–7)}, 3–6
Win	11–8	Jan 2021	Egypt M15	Futures	Clay	(United States) Nicolas Moreno de Alboran	6–0, 6–0
Win	12–8	Apr 2021	Argentina M15	Futures	Clay	(Argentina) Facundo Juárez	6–3, 6–2
Win	13–8	Jun 2021	Turkey M15	Futures	Clay	(Argentina) Francisco Comesaña	6–4, 6–2
Win	14–8	Jun 2021	Turkey M15	Futures	Clay	(Russia) Savva Polukhin	6–2, 6–3
Loss	14–9	Sep 2021	Quito	Challenger	Clay	(Argentina) Facundo Mena	4–6, 4–6
Win	15–9	Aug 2022	Guayaquil M25, Ecuador	World Tennis Tour	Clay	(Brazil) João Lucas Reis da Silva	6–4, 4–6, 6–2
Loss	15–10	Sep 2022	Ibagué M25, Colombia	World Tennis Tour	Clay	(Brazil) Gustavo Heide	3–6, 5–7
Loss	15–11	Nov 2022	Salta M25, Argentina	World Tennis Tour	Clay	(Brazil) Gustavo Heide	4–6, 4–6
Win	16–11	Nov 2022	Córdoba M15, Argentina	World Tennis Tour	Clay	(Argentina) Matías Franco Descotte	6–2, 3–6, 7–6^{(7–3)}

=== Doubles ===
Legend (doubles)
Challengers (0–2)
Futures (2–5)

Result	W–L	Date	Tournament	Tier	Surface	Partner	Opponents	Score
Loss	0–1	Oct 2011	Chile F11	Futures	Clay	(Chile) Cristóbal Saavedra Corvalán	(Argentina) Federico Coria (Argentina) Gabriel Hidalgo	6–3, 6–7^{(6–8)}, [7–10]
Loss	0–2	Feb 2012	Chile F4	Futures	Clay	(Colombia) Felipe Mantilla	(Chile) Jorge Aguilar (Chile) Rodrigo Perez	3–6, 2–6
Win	1–2	Oct 2012	Chile F10	Futures	Clay	(Chile) Nicolás Jarry	(Argentina) Gabriel Hidalgo (Argentina) Mauricio Pérez	5–7, 6–3, [10–4]
Win	2–2	Oct 2012	Chile F11	Futures	Clay	(Chile) Benjamín Ugarte	(Argentina) Patricio Heras (Argentina) Gastón Paz	7–6^{(7–5)}, 6–7^{(4–7)}, [10–4]
Loss	0–1	Nov 2014	Montevideo	Challenger	Clay	(Chile) Nicolás Jarry	(Uruguay) Pablo Cuevas (Uruguay) Martín Cuevas	2–6, 4–6
Loss	2–3	Dec 2014	Chile F9	Futures	Clay	(Uruguay) Ariel Behar	(Chile) Julio Peralta (Chile) Hans Podlipnik Castillo	6–7^{(3–7)}, 2–6
Loss	0–2	Oct 2016	Lima	Challenger	Clay	(Uruguay) Ariel Behar	(Peru) Sergio Galdós (Argentina) Leonardo Mayer	2–6, 6–7^{(7–9)}
Loss	2–4	Jan 2019	M15 Naples, USA	Futures	Clay	(Chile) Alejandro Tabilo	(Republic of Ireland) Julian Bradley (United States) Strong Kirchheimer	4–6, 2–6
Loss	2–5	Dec 2020	M15 Santo Domingo	Futures	Hard	(Ecuador) Antonio Cayetano March	(Dominican Republic) Nick Hardt (Japan) Shintaro Mochizuki	3–6, 3–6
