= 2018 Aspria Tennis Cup – Singles =

Singles
- 2018 Aspria Tennis Cup

Final
- Champion: (Serbia) Laslo Đere
- Runner-up: (Italy) Gianluca Mager
- Score: 6–2, 6–1

Events
Singles	Doubles
← 2017 ·	Aspria Tennis Cup	· 2019 →

Guido Pella was the defending champion but chose not to defend his title.

Laslo Đere won the title after defeating Gianluca Mager 6–2, 6–1 in the final.

== Seeds ==
1. (Serbia) Laslo Đere (champion)
2. (Portugal) Pedro Sousa (quarterfinals)
3. (Brazil) Rogério Dutra Silva (quarterfinals, retired)
4. (Canada) Félix Auger-Aliassime (first round)
5. (Argentina) Carlos Berlocq (first round)
6. (Serbia) Peđa Krstin (semifinals)
7. (Italy) Gianluigi Quinzi (second round)
8. (Spain) Nicola Kuhn (first round)

== Draw ==
=== Key ===
- Q = Qualifier
- WC = Wild card
- LL = Lucky loser
- Alt = Alternate
- SE = Special exempt
- PR = Protected ranking
- ITF = ITF entry
- JE = Junior exempt
- w/o = Walkover
- r = Retired
- d = Defaulted
- SR = Special ranking

=== Finals ===
Semifinals
1	(Serbia) Laslo Đere	7^{8}	4	7
SE	(Netherlands) Thiemo de Bakker	6^{6}	6	5
6	(Serbia) Peđa Krstin	3	1
Q	(Italy) Gianluca Mager	6	6

Final
1	(Serbia) Laslo Đere	6	6
Q	(Italy) Gianluca Mager	2	1

=== Top half ===
First round
1	(Serbia) L Đere	6	5	6
Q	(Spain) J Samper Montaña	2	7	1
(Spain) B Zapata Miralles	6	1	6
WC	(Italy) F Baldi	3	6	1
(Italy) L Giustino	6	6
(Austria) M Neuchrist	3	2
(Portugal) J Domingues	6^{6}	6	6
5	(Argentina) C Berlocq	7^{8}	3	4
4	(Canada) F Auger-Aliassime	2	1
SE	(Netherlands) T de Bakker	6	6
Q	(Australia) A Popyrin	3	4
(Spain) M Vilella Martínez	6	6
(Italy) A Arnaboldi	7^{7}	6
SE	(Netherlands) S Griekspoor	6^{3}	4
(Argentina) H Casanova	4	4
7	(Italy) G Quinzi	6	6

Second round
1	(Serbia) L Đere	6	6
(Spain) B Zapata Miralles	4	3
(Italy) L Giustino	6^{4}	2
(Portugal) J Domingues	7^{7}	6
SE	(Netherlands) T de Bakker	6	2	6
(Spain) M Vilella Martínez	4	6	2
(Italy) A Arnaboldi	7	2	6
7	(Italy) G Quinzi	5	6	3

Quarterfinals
1	(Serbia) L Đere	6	6
(Portugal) J Domingues	4	4
SE	(Netherlands) T de Bakker	3	6	6
(Italy) A Arnaboldi	6	1	4

Semifinals
1	(Serbia) L Đere	7^{8}	4	7
SE	(Netherlands) T de Bakker	6^{6}	6	5

=== Bottom half ===
First round
6	(Serbia) P Krstin	7^{7}	6
(Spain) P Martínez	6^{3}	0
(Spain) Carlos Boluda-Purkiss	5	7	1
(France) M Bourgue	7	5	6
WC	(Italy) Riccardo Balzerani	1	3
Q	(France) H Grenier	6	6
(Spain) D Muñoz de la Nava	4	1
3	(Brazil) R Dutra Silva	6	6
8	(Spain) N Kuhn	2	1
Q	(Italy) G Mager	6	6
WC	(Italy) A Pellegrino	2	0
(Portugal) João Monteiro	6	6
Alt	(Italy) F Gaio	6	6
WC	(Italy) J Ocleppo	3	0
(Argentina) F Argüello	6	4	4
2	(Portugal) P Sousa	4	6	6

Second round
6	(Serbia) P Krstin	6	6
(France) M Bourgue	4	4
Q	(France) H Grenier	4	3
3	(Brazil) R Dutra Silva	6	6
Q	(Italy) G Mager	6	6
(Portugal) J Monteiro	1	2
Alt	(Italy) F Gaio	3	4
2	(Portugal) P Sousa	6	6

Quarterfinals
6	(Serbia) P Krstin	6	3
3	(Brazil) R Dutra Silva	1	2^{r}
Q	(Italy) G Mager	7	7
2	(Portugal) P Sousa	5	5

Semifinals
6	(Serbia) P Krstin	3	1
Q	(Italy) G Mager	6	6
