= 2015 Aspria Tennis Cup =

- Date: 20 – 28 June
- Edition: 10th
- Draw: 32S / 16D
- Prize money: €42,500+H
- Surface: Clay
- Location: Milan, Italy

Champions

Singles
- (Argentina) Federico Delbonis

Doubles
- (Croatia) Nikola Mektić / (Croatia) Antonio Šančić
← 2014 ·	Aspria Tennis Cup	· 2016 →

The 2015 Aspria Tennis Cup was a professional tennis tournament played on clay courts. It was the tenth edition of the tournament which was part of the 2015 ATP Challenger Tour. It took place in Milan, Italy, between 20 and 28 June 2015.

== Singles main-draw entrants ==
=== Seeds ===
Country	Player	Rank^{1}	Seed
FRA	Benoît Paire	67	1
ARG	Federico Delbonis	80	2
SLO	Blaž Kavčič	91	3
ITA	Marco Cecchinato	126	4
KAZ	Andrey Golubev	135	5
SRB	Laslo Djere	187	6
IND	Ramkumar Ramanathan	208	7
ITA	Filippo Volandri	230	8

- ^{1} Rankings are as of June 15, 2015.

=== Other entrants ===
The following players received wildcards into the singles main draw:

- (Italy) Filippo Baldi
- (Italy) Gianluigi Quinzi
- (Italy) Pietro Licciardi
- (Italy) Gianluca Mager

The following players received entry from the qualifying draw:

- (France) Benoît Paire
- (Brazil) Rogério Dutra Silva
- (Italy) Flavio Cipolla
- (Serbia) Laslo Đere

The following player received entry as special exempt:

- (France) Calvin Hemery
- (Spain) José Checa Calvo

== Doubles main-draw entrants ==
=== Seeds ===
Country	Player	Country	Player	Rank^{1}	Seed
COL	Nicolás Barrientos	PER	Sergio Galdós	241	1
ITA	Flavio Cipolla	KAZ	Andrey Golubev	318	2
IRL	James Cluskey	IRL	David O'Hare	407	3
ROM	Patrick Grigoriu	IND	Ramkumar Ramanathan	473	4

- ^{1} Rankings as of June 15, 2015.

=== Other entrants ===
The following pairs received wildcards into the doubles main draw:

- (Italy) Davide Carpi / (Switzerland) Stefano Mezzadri
- (Italy) Filippo Baldi / (Italy) Gianluigi Quinzi
- (Italy) Alessandro Giannessi / (Italy) Pietro Licciardi

== Champions ==
=== Singles ===
- (Argentina) Federico Delbonis def. (Brazil) Rogério Dutra Silva, 6–1, 7–6^{(8–6)}.

=== Doubles ===
- (Croatia) Nikola Mektić / (Croatia) Antonio Šančić def. (Chile) Cristian Garín / (Chile) Juan Carlos Sáez, 6–3, 6–4.
