= 2016 Aspria Tennis Cup – Doubles =

Doubles
- 2016 Aspria Tennis Cup

Final
- Champion: (Mexico) Miguel Ángel Reyes-Varela (United States) Max Schnur
- Runner-up: (Italy) Alessandro Motti (Chinese Taipei) Peng Hsien-yin
- Score: 1–6, 7–6^{(7–4)}, [10–5]

Events
Singles	Doubles
← 2015 ·	Aspria Tennis Cup	· 2017 →

Nikola Mektić and Antonio Šančić were the defending champions but chose not to participate.

Miguel Ángel Reyes-Varela and Max Schnur won the title after defeating Alessandro Motti and Peng Hsien-yin 1–6, 7–6^{(7–4)}, [10–5] in the final.

== Seeds ==
1. (Argentina) Andrés Molteni / (Chile) Julio Peralta (quarterfinals)
2. (Poland) Tomasz Bednarek / (Belarus) Sergey Betov (quarterfinals)
3. (Italy) Riccardo Ghedin / (Chinese Taipei) Hsieh Cheng-peng (first round)
4. (China) Gong Maoxin / (South Africa) Ruan Roelofse (first round)

== Draw ==
=== Key ===
- Q = Qualifier
- WC = Wild card
- LL = Lucky loser
- Alt = Alternate
- SE = Special exempt
- PR = Protected ranking
- ITF = ITF entry
- JE = Junior exempt
- w/o = Walkover
- r = Retired
- d = Defaulted
- SR = Special ranking

First round
1	(Argentina) A Molteni (Chile) J Peralta	6	6
(Austria) B Trinker (Serbia) M Zekić	1	1
(Czech Republic) R Jebavý (Czech Republic) Robin Staněk	7^{7}	2	[3]
(Mexico) MÁ Reyes-Varela (United States) M Schnur	6^{3}	6	[10]
3	(Italy) R Ghedin (Chinese Taipei) C-p Hsieh	4	5
WC	(Italy) F Baldi (Italy) G Quinzi	6	7
(Croatia) I Sabanov (Croatia) M Sabanov	6	6
WC	(Italy) Federico Dragoni (Italy) Andrea Fierro	4	0
(Italy) A Motti (Chinese Taipei) H-y Peng	6^{6}	6	[10]
(Ecuador) E Gómez (Venezuela) LD Martínez	7^{8}	3	[8]
WC	(Italy) M Donati (Italy) L Sonego	6	6
4	(China) M Gong (South Africa) R Roelofse	3	2
(Dominican Republic) J Hernández (Argentina) JI Londero	4	3
(Colombia) A González (Slovenia) B Rola	6	6
(Belgium) A De Greef (Belgium) Y Reuter	5	0
2	(Poland) T Bednarek (Belarus) S Betov	7	6

Quarterfinals
1	(Argentina) A Molteni (Chile) J Peralta	6	6^{6}	[5]
(Mexico) MÁ Reyes-Varela (United States) M Schnur	3	7^{8}	[10]
WC	(Italy) F Baldi (Italy) G Quinzi	7^{8}	6
(Croatia) I Sabanov (Croatia) M Sabanov	6^{6}	3
(Italy) A Motti (Chinese Taipei) H-y Peng	5	6	[14]
WC	(Italy) M Donati (Italy) L Sonego	7	2	[12]
(Colombia) A González (Slovenia) B Rola	6	7^{7}
2	(Poland) T Bednarek (Belarus) S Betov	3	6^{3}

Semifinals
(Mexico) MÁ Reyes-Varela (United States) M Schnur	6	7
WC	(Italy) F Baldi (Italy) G Quinzi	4	5
(Italy) A Motti (Chinese Taipei) H-y Peng	6	6
(Colombia) A González (Slovenia) B Rola	4	4

Final
(Mexico) MÁ Reyes-Varela (United States) M Schnur	1	7^{7}	[10]
(Italy) A Motti (Chinese Taipei) H-y Peng	6	6^{4}	[5]
