= 2014 Aspria Tennis Cup – Doubles =

Doubles
- 2014 Aspria Tennis Cup

Final
- Champion: (Argentina) Guillermo Durán (Argentina) Máximo González
- Runner-up: (United States) James Cerretani (Germany) Frank Moser
- Score: 6–3, 6–3

Events
Singles	Doubles
← 2013 ·	Aspria Tennis Cup	· 2015 →

Marco Crugnola and Daniele Giorgini were the defending champions, but decided not to compete.

Guillermo Durán and Máximo González won the title, defeating James Cerretani and Frank Moser in the final, 6–3, 6–3.

== Seeds ==
1. (Argentina) Guillermo Durán / (Argentina) Máximo González (champions)
2. (Colombia) Nicolás Barrientos / (Colombia) Juan Carlos Spir (semifinals)
3. (Belarus) Sergey Betov / (Belarus) Alexander Bury (first round)
4. (United States) James Cerretani / (Germany) Frank Moser (final)

== Draw ==
=== Key ===
- Q = Qualifier
- WC = Wild card
- LL = Lucky loser
- Alt = Alternate
- SE = Special exempt
- PR = Protected ranking
- ITF = ITF entry
- JE = Junior exempt
- w/o = Walkover
- r = Retired
- d = Defaulted
- SR = Special ranking

=== Draw ===
First round
1	(Argentina) G Durán (Argentina) M González	6	6
WC	(Italy) F Baldi (Italy) M Donati	4	3
(Italy) G Naso (Romania) A Ungur	6	6
WC	(Italy) Eugenio Gibertini (Italy) Vito Gioia	1	0
3	(Belarus) S Betov (Belarus) A Bury	5	2
(Argentina) F Argüello (Uruguay) M Cuevas	7	6
(Italy) M Cecchinato (Italy) A Motti	3	6	[10]
WC	(Italy) A Brizzi (Italy) Riccardo Sinicropi	6	4	[5]
(Bolivia) H Dellien (Argentina) R Olivo	7	7^{7}
(Italy) C Grassi (Italy) P Starace	5	6^{5}
(Uruguay) A Behar (United States) V Mirzadeh	4	4
4	(United States) J Cerretani (Germany) F Moser	6	6
(Peru) S Galdós (Argentina) A Molteni	6	7^{7}
(Spain) J Lizariturry (Spain) A Ramos	3	6^{5}
(Serbia) G Tošić (Croatia) A Veić	4	4
2	(Colombia) N Barrientos (Colombia) JS Spir	6	6

Quarterfinals
1	(Argentina) G Durán (Argentina) M González	6	6
(Italy) G Naso (Romania) A Ungur	3	4
(Argentina) F Argüello (Uruguay) M Cuevas	6	6
(Italy) M Cecchinato (Italy) A Motti	1	2
(Bolivia) H Dellien (Argentina) R Olivo	6	6^{5}	[4]
4	(United States) J Cerretani (Germany) F Moser	2	7^{7}	[10]
(Peru) S Galdós (Argentina) A Molteni	1	4
2	(Colombia) N Barrientos (Colombia) JS Spir	6	6

Semifinals
1	(Argentina) G Durán (Argentina) M González
(Argentina) F Argüello (Uruguay) M Cuevas	w/o
4	(United States) J Cerretani (Germany) F Moser	6^{9}	7^{7}	[10]
2	(Colombia) N Barrientos (Colombia) JS Spir	7^{11}	6^{3}	[6]

Final
1	(Argentina) G Durán (Argentina) M González	6	6
4	(United States) J Cerretani (Germany) F Moser	3	3
