= 2019 Aspria Tennis Cup – Doubles =

Doubles
- 2019 Aspria Tennis Cup

Final
- Champions: (Bosnia and Herzegovina) Tomislav Brkić (Croatia) Ante Pavić
- Runners-up: (Belarus) Andrei Vasilevski (Italy) Andrea Vavassori
- Score: 7–6^{(8–6)}, 6–2

Events
Singles	Doubles
- Aspria Tennis Cup

Julian Ocleppo and Andrea Vavassori were the defending champions but chose to defend their title with different partners. Ocleppo partnered Andrea Pellegrino but lost in the first round to David Marrero and Roberto Maytín. Vavassori partnered Andrei Vasilevski but lost in the final to Tomislav Brkić and Ante Pavić.

Brkić and Pavić won the title after defeating Vasilevski and Vavassori 7–6^{(8–6)}, 6–2 in the final.

== Seeds ==
1. (El Salvador) Marcelo Arévalo / (Mexico) Miguel Ángel Reyes-Varela (semifinals)
2. (Chile) Hans Podlipnik Castillo / (Austria) Tristan-Samuel Weissborn (first round)
3. (United States) James Cerretani / (United States) Nathaniel Lammons (first round)
4. (Brazil) Fabrício Neis / (Brazil) Fernando Romboli (quarterfinals)

== Draw ==
Key

- Q = Qualifier
- WC = Wild card
- LL = Lucky loser
- Alt = Alternate
- ITF = ITF entry
- PR = Protected ranking
- SR = Special ranking
- SE = Special exempt
- JE = Junior exempt
- JR = Junior Accelerator Programme entrant
- CO = College Accelerator Programme entrant
- NG = Next Gen Accelerator Program entrant
- w/o = Walkover
- r = Retired
- d = Defaulted

First round
1	(El Salvador) M Arévalo (Mexico) MÁ Reyes-Varela	6	6
WC	(Italy) Riccardo Balzerani (Italy) Emiliano Maggioli	4	2
WC	(Italy) J Ocleppo (Italy) A Pellegrino	4	6^{4}
(Spain) D Marrero (Venezuela) R Maytín	6	7^{7}
3	(United States) J Cerretani (United States) N Lammons	6	5	[8]
(Belarus) A Vasilevski (Italy) A Vavassori	3	7	[10]
ITF	(Italy) M Bortolotti (Australia) S Puodziunas	4	7^{7}	[6]
(Mexico) H Hach Verdugo (United States) N Pasha	6	6^{5}	[10]
(Uruguay) A Behar (Ecuador) G Escobar	6	7^{7}
(Sweden) A Göransson (Netherlands) S Verbeek	3	6^{4}
(United States) E King (United States) H Reese	6^{4}	4
4	(Brazil) F Neis (Brazil) F Romboli	7^{7}	6
ITF	(Italy) R Bonadio (Belgium) Christopher Heyman	6	6
WC	(Italy) Carlo Annovazzi (Italy) Giovanni Battista Olivero	1	1
(Bosnia and Herzegovina) T Brkić (Croatia) A Pavić	6	6
2	(Chile) H Podlipnik Castillo (Austria) T-S Weissborn	3	4

Quarterfinals
1	(El Salvador) M Arévalo (Mexico) MÁ Reyes-Varela	6	3	[10]
(Spain) D Marrero (Venezuela) R Maytín	3	6	[7]
(Belarus) A Vasilevski (Italy) A Vavassori	6	7^{7}
(Mexico) H Hach Verdugo (United States) N Pasha	1	6^{5}
(Uruguay) A Behar (Ecuador) G Escobar	7^{7}	6
4	(Brazil) F Neis (Brazil) F Romboli	6^{4}	3
ITF	(Italy) R Bonadio (Belgium) C Heyman	3	1
(Bosnia and Herzegovina) T Brkić (Croatia) A Pavić	6	6

Semifinals
1	(El Salvador) M Arévalo (Mexico) MÁ Reyes-Varela	4	0
(Belarus) A Vasilevski (Italy) A Vavassori	6	6
(Uruguay) A Behar (Ecuador) G Escobar	5	3
(Bosnia and Herzegovina) T Brkić (Croatia) A Pavić	7	6

Final
(Belarus) A Vasilevski (Italy) A Vavassori	6^{6}	2
(Bosnia and Herzegovina) T Brkić (Croatia) A Pavić	7^{8}	6
