= 2016 Aspria Tennis Cup – Singles =

Singles
- 2016 Aspria Tennis Cup

Final
- Champion: (Italy) Marco Cecchinato
- Runner-up: (Serbia) Laslo Đere
- Score: 6–2, 6–2

Events
| Singles | Doubles |
| ← 2015 · | Aspria Tennis Cup | · 2017 → |

Federico Delbonis was the defending champion but chose not to participate.

Marco Cecchinato won the title after defeating Laslo Đere 6–2, 6–2 in the final.

== Seeds ==
1. (Brazil) Rogério Dutra Silva (second round)
2. (Portugal) Gastão Elias (quarterfinals)
3. (Spain) Roberto Carballés Baena (first round)
4. (Argentina) Carlos Berlocq (semifinals)
5. (Italy) Marco Cecchinato (champion)
6. (Colombia) Alejandro González (first round)
7. (Chile) Gonzalo Lama (first round)
8. (Spain) Daniel Gimeno-Traver (semifinals)

== Draw ==
=== Key ===
- Q = Qualifier
- WC = Wild card
- LL = Lucky loser
- Alt = Alternate
- SE = Special exempt
- PR = Protected ranking
- ITF = ITF entry
- JE = Junior exempt
- w/o = Walkover
- r = Retired
- d = Defaulted
- SR = Special ranking

=== Finals ===
Semifinals
5 | (Italy) Marco Cecchinato | 6 | 6
4 | (Argentina) Carlos Berlocq | 4 | 2
(Serbia) Laslo Đere | 6 | 3 | 7
8 | (Spain) Daniel Gimeno-Traver | 2 | 6 | 5

Final
5 | (Italy) Marco Cecchinato | 6 | 6
(Serbia) Laslo Đere | 2 | 2

=== Top half ===
First round
1 | (Brazil) R Dutra Silva | 6 | 6
Q | (Italy) A Basso | 0 | 2
Q | (Chile) N Jarry | 5 | 3
(Belgium) A De Greef | 7 | 6
Alt | (Ecuador) E Gómez | 7 | 6
(Austria) B Trinker | 5 | 2
SE | (Argentina) JI Londero | 6 | 5 | 0
5 | (Italy) M Cecchinato | 2 | 7 | 6
4 | (Argentina) C Berlocq | 7 | 6
WC | (Italy) G Quinzi | 5 | 2
(Belgium) Y Reuter | 7 | 6
(Czech Republic) Robin Staněk | 5 | 3
WC | (Italy) G Mager | 6 | 7
(Argentina) A Velotti | 3 | 5
(Serbia) M Zekić | 6 | 6^{1} | 6
7 | (Chile) G Lama | 3 | 7^{7} | 4

Second round
1 | (Brazil) R Dutra Silva | 7^{7} | 2 | 3
(Belgium) A De Greef | 6^{3} | 6 | 6
Alt | (Ecuador) E Gómez | 2 | 3
5 | (Italy) M Cecchinato | 6 | 6
4 | (Argentina) C Berlocq | 6 | 6
(Belgium) Y Reuter | 4 | 0
WC | (Italy) G Mager | 6 | 3 | 4
(Serbia) M Zekić | 4 | 6 | 6

Quarterfinals
(Belgium) A De Greef | 3 | 2
5 | (Italy) M Cecchinato | 6 | 6
4 | (Argentina) C Berlocq | 7^{7} | 6
(Serbia) M Zekić | 6^{3} | 4

Semifinals
5 | (Italy) M Cecchinato | 6 | 6
4 | (Argentina) C Berlocq | 4 | 2

=== Bottom half ===
First round
6 | (Colombia) A González | 6^{2} | 3
(Italy) M Viola | 7^{7} | 6
(Serbia) L Đere | 6 | 7
Q | (Czech Republic) V Šafránek | 2 | 5
(Belgium) K Coppejans | 1 | 2
WC | (Italy) M Donati | 6 | 6
WC | (Italy) Edoardo Eremin | 6 | 6
3 | (Spain) R Carballés Baena | 2 | 2
8 | (Spain) D Gimeno-Traver | 6 | 6
(Slovenia) B Rola | 4 | 1
(Italy) F Volandri | 6 | 6
Q | (Italy) L Sonego | 3 | 3
Alt | (Russia) A Karatsev | 6 | 6
Alt | (Germany) M Marterer | 2 | 4
(Russia) I Nedelko | 0 | 5
2 | (Portugal) G Elias | 6 | 7

Second round
(Italy) M Viola | 4 | 6 | 1
(Serbia) L Đere | 6 | 3 | 6
WC | (Italy) M Donati | 6 | 6
WC | (Italy) E Eremin | 4 | 2
8 | (Spain) D Gimeno-Traver | 6 | 2 | 6
(Italy) F Volandri | 2 | 6 | 0
Alt | (Russia) A Karatsev | 2 | 6 | 2
2 | (Portugal) G Elias | 6 | 3 | 6

Quarterfinals
(Serbia) L Đere | 6 | 7^{10}
WC | (Italy) M Donati | 2 | 6^{8}
8 | (Spain) D Gimeno-Traver | 3 | 6 | 6
2 | (Portugal) G Elias | 6 | 3 | 2

Semifinals
(Serbia) L Đere | 6 | 3 | 7
8 | (Spain) D Gimeno-Traver | 2 | 6 | 5
