= 2017 Aspria Tennis Cup =

- Date: 26 June – 2 July
- Edition: 12th
- Draw: 32S / 16D
- Surface: Clay
- Location: Milan, Italy

Champions

Singles
- (Argentina) Guido Pella

Doubles
- (Poland) Tomasz Bednarek / (Netherlands) David Pel
← 2016 ·	Aspria Tennis Cup	· 2018 →

The 2017 Aspria Tennis Cup was a professional tennis tournament played on clay courts. It was the twelfth edition of the tournament which was part of the 2017 ATP Challenger Tour. It took place in Milan, Italy between 26 June and 2 July 2017.

== Singles main-draw entrants ==
=== Seeds ===
Country	Player	Rank^{1}	Seed
ITA	Marco Cecchinato	97	1
BRA	Thiago Monteiro	98	2
ARG	Federico Delbonis	109	3
POR	Gastão Elias	110	4
ARG	Guido Pella	112	5
BEL	Arthur De Greef	113	6
BLR	Uladzimir Ignatik	129	7
KAZ	Dmitry Popko	200	8

- ^{1} Rankings are as of 19 June 2017.

=== Other entrants ===
The following players received wildcards into the singles main draw:

- (Italy) Liam Caruana
- (Italy) Gianluca Di Nicola
- (Italy) Lorenzo Frigerio
- (Italy) Gianluca Mager

The following players received entry into the singles main draw as special exempts:

- (Australia) Alex Bolt
- (Israel) Edan Leshem

The following player received entry into the singles main draw as an alternate:

- (Argentina) Andrea Collarini

The following players received entry from the qualifying draw:

- (Argentina) Juan Ignacio Londero
- (Spain) Daniel Muñoz de la Nava
- (Argentina) Juan Pablo Paz
- (Brazil) João Pedro Sorgi

== Champions ==
=== Singles ===
- (Argentina) Guido Pella def. (Argentina) Federico Delbonis 6–2, 2–1 ret.

=== Doubles ===
- (Poland) Tomasz Bednarek / (Netherlands) David Pel def. (Italy) Filippo Baldi / (Italy) Omar Giacalone 6–1, 6–1.
