= 2015 Aspria Tennis Cup – Doubles =

Doubles
- 2015 Aspria Tennis Cup

Final
- Champion: (Croatia) Nikola Mektić (Croatia) Antonio Šančić
- Runner-up: (Chile) Christian Garin (Chile) Juan Carlos Sáez
- Score: 6–3, 6–4

Events
Singles	Doubles
← 2014 ·	Aspria Tennis Cup	· 2016 →

Guillermo Durán and Máximo González were the defending champions, but the pair were not able to participate this year.
Nikola Mektić and Antonio Šančić won the title, defeating Christian Garin and Juan Carlos Sáez in the final, 6–3, 6–4.

== Seeds ==
1. (Colombia) Nicolás Barrientos / (Peru) Sergio Galdós (first round)
2. (Italy) Flavio Cipolla / (Kazakhstan) Andrey Golubev (quarterfinals)
3. (Republic of Ireland) James Cluskey / (Republic of Ireland) David O'Hare (first round)
4. (Romania) Patrick Grigoriu / (India) Ramkumar Ramanathan (first round)

== Draw ==
=== Key ===
- Q = Qualifier
- WC = Wild card
- LL = Lucky loser
- Alt = Alternate
- SE = Special exempt
- PR = Protected ranking
- ITF = ITF entry
- JE = Junior exempt
- w/o = Walkover
- r = Retired
- d = Defaulted
- SR = Special ranking

=== Draw ===
First round
1	(Colombia) N Barrientos (Peru) S Galdós	7	5	[8]
(Philippines) R Gonzales (Poland) G Panfil	5	7	[10]
(El Salvador) M Arévalo (Brazil) F de Paula	6	6
WC	(Italy) Davide Carpi (Switzerland) S Mezzadri	0	2
4	(Romania) P Grigoriu (India) R Ramanathan	3	7^{7}	[6]
(France) A Michon (France) B Paire	6	6^{3}	[10]
(Croatia) N Mektić (Croatia) A Šančić	5	7^{7}	[11]
(Spain) O Roca Batalla (Spain) J Samper-Montaña	7	6^{1}	[9]
(Italy) R Bellotti (Germany) P Torebko	3	3
(Chile) C Garin (Chile) JC Sáez	6	6
WC	(Italy) F Baldi (Italy) G Quinzi	6	6
3	(Republic of Ireland) J Cluskey (Republic of Ireland) D O'Hare	3	2
PR	(Spain) J Checa-Calvo (Mexico) C Ramírez	4	6	[6]
WC	(Italy) A Giannessi (Italy) Pietro Licciardi	6	2	[10]
(Bosnia and Herzegovina) T Brkić (Croatia) M Delić	3	1
2	(Italy) F Cipolla (Kazakhstan) A Golubev	6	6

Quarterfinals
(Philippines) R Gonzales (Poland) G Panfil	2	2
(El Salvador) M Arévalo (Brazil) F de Paula	6	6
(France) A Michon (France) B Paire	6	3	[8]
(Croatia) N Mektić (Croatia) A Šančić	4	6	[10]
(Chile) C Garin (Chile) JC Sáez	6	6
WC	(Italy) F Baldi (Italy) G Quinzi	0	2
WC	(Italy) A Giannessi (Italy) P Licciardi	7	2	[10]
2	(Italy) F Cipolla (Kazakhstan) A Golubev	5	6	[6]

Semifinals
(El Salvador) M Arévalo (Brazil) F de Paula	1	1
(Croatia) N Mektić (Croatia) A Šančić	6	6
(Chile) C Garin (Chile) JC Sáez	6	6
WC	(Italy) A Giannessi (Italy) P Licciardi	2	4

Final
(Croatia) N Mektić (Croatia) A Šančić	6	6
(Chile) C Garin (Chile) JC Sáez	3	4
