= 2018 Aspria Tennis Cup – Doubles =

Doubles
- 2018 Aspria Tennis Cup

Final
- Champions: (Italy) Julian Ocleppo (Italy) Andrea Vavassori
- Runners-up: (Ecuador) Gonzalo Escobar (Brazil) Fernando Romboli
- Score: 4–6, 6–1, [11–9]

Events
Singles	Doubles
- Aspria Tennis Cup

Tomasz Bednarek and David Pel were the defending champions but chose not to defend their title.

Julian Ocleppo and Andrea Vavassori won the title after defeating Gonzalo Escobar and Fernando Romboli 4–6, 6–1, [11–9] in the final.

== Seeds ==
1. (United States) Nathan Pasha / (United States) Hunter Reese (quarterfinals)
2. (Mexico) Hans Hach Verdugo / (Sweden) Andreas Siljeström (semifinals)
3. (Spain) Pedro Martínez / (Spain) David Vega Hernández (first round)
4. (Italy) Alessandro Motti / (Ukraine) Volodymyr Uzhylovskyi (semifinals)

== Draw ==
Key

- Q = Qualifier
- WC = Wild card
- LL = Lucky loser
- Alt = Alternate
- ITF = ITF entry
- PR = Protected ranking
- SR = Special ranking
- SE = Special exempt
- JE = Junior exempt
- JR = Junior Accelerator Programme entrant
- CO = College Accelerator Programme entrant
- NG = Next Gen Accelerator Program entrant
- w/o = Walkover
- r = Retired
- d = Defaulted

First round
1	(United States) N Pasha (United States) H Reese	6	6
WC	(Italy) Edoardo Bianchi (Italy) Lorenzo Ferrari	0	1
(Croatia) I Sabanov (Croatia) M Sabanov	2	3
(Ecuador) G Escobar (Brazil) F Romboli	6	6
4	(Italy) A Motti (Ukraine) V Uzhylovskyi	4	6	[10]
(Serbia) N Čačić (Switzerland) L Margaroli	6	4	[8]
WC	(Italy) F Gaio (Italy) A Pellegrino	6	7
(Argentina) F Argüello (Venezuela) R Maytín	4	5
(Italy) J Ocleppo (Italy) A Vavassori	3	6	[10]
(Colombia) A González (Portugal) P Sousa	6	4	[5]
(Croatia) T Draganja (Poland) S Walków	6	3	[10]
3	(Spain) P Martínez (Spain) D Vega Hernández	4	6	[6]
(Philippines) R Gonzales (United States) N Lammons	6	3	[12]
WC	(Italy) F Baldi (Italy) E Dalla Valle	3	6	[14]
PR	(Italy) A Arnaboldi (Italy) D Bracciali	6	3	[11]
2	(Mexico) H Hach Verdugo (Sweden) A Siljeström	2	6	[13]

Quarterfinals
1	(United States) N Pasha (United States) H Reese	2	4
(Ecuador) G Escobar (Brazil) F Romboli	6	6
4	(Italy) A Motti (Ukraine) V Uzhylovskyi	3	6	[10]
WC	(Italy) F Gaio (Italy) A Pellegrino	6	3	[5]
(Italy) J Ocleppo (Italy) A Vavassori	6	6
(Croatia) T Draganja (Poland) S Walków	1	2
WC	(Italy) F Baldi (Italy) E Dalla Valle	6^{5}	4
2	(Mexico) H Hach Verdugo (Sweden) A Siljeström	7^{7}	6

Semifinals
(Ecuador) G Escobar (Brazil) F Romboli	7	6
4	(Italy) A Motti (Ukraine) V Uzhylovskyi	5	2
(Italy) J Ocleppo (Italy) A Vavassori	2	7	[10]
2	(Mexico) H Hach Verdugo (Sweden) A Siljeström	6	5	[7]

Final
(Ecuador) G Escobar (Brazil) F Romboli	6	1	[9]
(Italy) J Ocleppo (Italy) A Vavassori	4	6	[11]
