= 2019 Aspria Tennis Cup =

- Date: 24–30 June
- Edition: 14th
- Draw: 48S / 16D
- Surface: Clay
- Location: Milan, Italy

Champions

Singles
- (Bolivia) Hugo Dellien

Doubles
- (Bosnia and Herzegovina) Tomislav Brkić / (Croatia) Ante Pavić
← 2018 ·	Aspria Tennis Cup	· 2021 →

The 2019 Aspria Tennis Cup was a professional tennis tournament played on clay courts. It was the fourteenth edition of the tournament which was part of the 2019 ATP Challenger Tour. It took place in Milan, Italy between 24 and 30 June 2019.

== Singles main-draw entrants ==
=== Seeds ===
Country	Player	Rank^{1}	Seed
BOL	Hugo Dellien	94	1
ITA	Paolo Lorenzi	96	2
JPN	Taro Daniel	107	3
POR	Pedro Sousa	122	4
KOR	Lee Duck-hee	213	5
ESP	Tommy Robredo	216	6
FRA	Elliot Benchetrit	218	7
IND	Sumit Nagal	251	8
~~ITA~~	~~Gianluigi Quinzi~~	~~252~~	~~9~~
FRA	Tristan Lamasine	254	10
AUS	Maverick Banes	257	11
ESP	Mario Vilella Martínez	260	12
NED	Scott Griekspoor	263	13
CAN	Filip Peliwo	265	14
ITA	Gian Marco Moroni	270	15
DOM	José Hernández-Fernández	275	16

- ^{1} Rankings are as of 17 June 2019.

=== Other entrants ===
The following players received wildcards into the singles main draw:

- (Italy) Francesco Forti
- (Italy) Paolo Lorenzi
- (Italy) Lorenzo Musetti
- (Italy) Julian Ocleppo
- (Italy) Giulio Zeppieri

The following players received entry into the singles main draw using their ITF World Tennis Ranking:

- (Italy) Riccardo Bonadio
- (Italy) Raúl Brancaccio
- (France) Corentin Denolly
- (Belgium) Christopher Heyman
- (Spain) Oriol Roca Batalla

The following players received entry from the qualifying draw:

- (Russia) Aslan Karatsev
- (Slovakia) Alex Molčan

The following player received entry as a lucky loser:

- (Italy) Riccardo Balzerani

== Champions ==
=== Singles ===
- (Bolivia) Hugo Dellien def. (Serbia) Danilo Petrović 7–5, 6–4.

=== Doubles ===
- (Bosnia and Herzegovina) Tomislav Brkić / (Croatia) Ante Pavić def. (Belarus) Andrei Vasilevski / (Italy) Andrea Vavassori 7–6^{(8–6)}, 6–2.
