= Ocleppo =

Ocleppo is an Italian surname. Notable people with the surname include:

- Dee Ocleppo (born 1966), American fashion designer
- Gianni Ocleppo (born 1957), Italian tennis player
- Julian Ocleppo (born 1997), Italian tennis player
