= 2014 Aspria Tennis Cup – Singles =

Singles
- 2014 Aspria Tennis Cup

Final
- Champion: (Spain) Albert Ramos
- Runner-up: (Spain) Pere Riba
- Score: 6–3, 7–5

Events
Singles	Doubles
← 2013 ·	Aspria Tennis Cup	· 2015 →

Filippo Volandri was the defending champion, but lost in the first round to Juan Lizariturry.

Albert Ramos won the title, defeating Pere Riba in the final, 6–3, 7–5.

== Seeds ==
1. (Spain) Pere Riba (final)
2. (Italy) Filippo Volandri (first round)
3. (Spain) Albert Ramos (champion)
4. (Argentina) Facundo Argüello (quarterfinals)
5. (Argentina) Máximo González (semifinals)
6. (Italy) Marco Cecchinato (semifinals)
7. (Romania) Adrian Ungur (second round)
8. (Italy) Potito Starace (first round)

== Draw ==
=== Key ===
- Q = Qualifier
- WC = Wild card
- LL = Lucky loser
- Alt = Alternate
- ITF = ITF entry
- PR = Protected ranking
- SR = Special ranking
- SE = Special exempt
- JE = Junior exempt
- JR = Junior Accelerator Programme entrant
- CO = College Accelerator Programme entrant
- NG = Next Gen Accelerator Program entrant
- w/o = Walkover
- r = Retired
- d = Defaulted

=== Finals ===
Semifinals
1	(Spain) Pere Riba	6	6
5	(Argentina) Máximo González	3	3
3	(Spain) Albert Ramos	6	6
6	(Italy) Marco Cecchinato	3	3

Final
1	(Spain) Pere Riba	3	5
3	(Spain) Albert Ramos	6	7

=== Top half ===
First round
1	(Spain) P Riba	7	7^{7}
(Italy) G Naso	5	6^{5}
(Bosnia and Herzegovina) A Šetkić	4	2
(Argentina) A Molteni	6	6
(Bosnia and Herzegovina) M Bašić	3	2
(Ukraine) A Smirnov	6	6
WC	(Italy) F Gaio	7	1	1
7	(Romania) A Ungur	5	6	6
4	(Argentina) F Argüello	6	6
(Italy) S Travaglia	4	2
WC	(Italy) F Baldi	2	6	7
(Austria) D Novak	6	3	5
(Italy) A Brizzi	6	7
(Argentina) R Olivo	2	5
Q	(Italy) R Marcora	3	5
5	(Argentina) M González	6	7

Second round
1	(Spain) P Riba	6	6
(Argentina) A Molteni	1	2
(Ukraine) A Smirnov	6	6
7	(Romania) A Ungur	1	2
4	(Argentina) F Argüello	6	6
WC	(Italy) F Baldi	2	4
(Italy) A Brizzi	1	1
5	(Argentina) M González	6	6

Quarterfinals
1	(Spain) P Riba	4	6	6
(Ukraine) A Smirnov	6	1	1
4	(Argentina) F Argüello	7	1	6^{3}
5	(Argentina) M González	5	6	7^{7}

Semifinals
1	(Spain) P Riba	6	6
5	(Argentina) M González	3	3

=== Bottom half ===
First round
8	(Italy) P Starace	5	3
(Croatia) A Veić	7	6
WC	(Italy) M Donati	4	4
(Argentina) M Trungelliti	6	6
Q	(Bolivia) H Dellien	4	6	6
WC	(Italy) G Mager	6	3	1
(Australia) J Thompson	2	6	5
3	(Spain) A Ramos	6	3	7
6	(Italy) M Cecchinato	6	6
(Italy) S Vagnozzi	3	4
SE	(Switzerland) M Lammer	7^{7}	6
(Czech Republic) A Pavlásek	6^{5}	2
SE	(France) G Mina	6	6
Q	(Japan) Y Nishioka	1	3
Q	(Spain) J Lizariturry	6	6
2	(Italy) F Volandri	4	4

Second round
(Croatia) A Veić	6	6
(Argentina) M Trungelliti	4	4
Q	(Bolivia) H Dellien	6^{7}	2
3	(Spain) A Ramos	7^{9}	6
6	(Italy) M Cecchinato	6	7
SE	(Switzerland) M Lammer	0	5
SE	(France) G Mina	7	4	5
Q	(Spain) J Lizariturry	5	6	7

Quarterfinals
(Croatia) A Veić	7^{7}	4	3
3	(Spain) A Ramos	6^{3}	6	6
6	(Italy) M Cecchinato	7	6
Q	(Spain) J Lizariturry	5	3

Semifinals
3	(Spain) A Ramos	6	6
6	(Italy) M Cecchinato	3	3
