= 2019 Aspria Tennis Cup – Singles =

Singles
- 2019 Aspria Tennis Cup

Final
- Champion: (Bolivia) Hugo Dellien
- Runner-up: (Serbia) Danilo Petrović
- Score: 7–5, 6–4

Events
Singles	Doubles
- Aspria Tennis Cup

Laslo Đere was the defending champion but chose not to defend his title.

Hugo Dellien won the title after defeating Danilo Petrović 7–5, 6–4 in the final.

== Seeds ==
All seeds receive a bye into the second round.

1. (Bolivia) Hugo Dellien (champion)
2. (Italy) Paolo Lorenzi (second round)
3. (Japan) Taro Daniel (second round)
4. (Portugal) Pedro Sousa (third round)
5. (South Korea) Lee Duck-hee (second round)
6. (Spain) Tommy Robredo (quarterfinals)
7. (France) Elliot Benchetrit (second round)
8. (India) Sumit Nagal (semifinals)
9. (Italy) Gianluigi Quinzi (withdrew)
10. (France) Tristan Lamasine (second round)
11. (Australia) Maverick Banes (second round)
12. (Spain) Mario Vilella Martínez (second round)
13. (Netherlands) Scott Griekspoor (second round)
14. (Canada) Filip Peliwo (second round)
15. (Italy) Gian Marco Moroni (second round)
16. (Dominican Republic) José Hernández-Fernández (third round, retired)

== Draw ==
Key

- Q = Qualifier
- WC = Wild card
- LL = Lucky loser
- Alt = Alternate
- ITF = ITF entry
- PR = Protected ranking
- SR = Special ranking
- SE = Special exempt
- JE = Junior exempt
- JR = Junior Accelerator Programme entrant
- CO = College Accelerator Programme entrant
- NG = Next Gen Accelerator Program entrant
- w/o = Walkover
- r = Retired
- d = Defaulted

=== Finals ===
Quarterfinals
1	(Bolivia) Hugo Dellien	6	6
6	(Spain) Tommy Robredo	2	3
WC	(Italy) Lorenzo Musetti	7^{7}	6
(El Salvador) Marcelo Arévalo	6^{4}	2
(Serbia) Danilo Petrović	6	6
(Portugal) Frederico Ferreira Silva	3	4
8	(India) Sumit Nagal	6	7^{7}
Q	(Russia) Aslan Karatsev	4	6^{4}

Semifinals
1	(Bolivia) Hugo Dellien	6	6
WC	(Italy) Lorenzo Musetti	2	4
(Serbia) Danilo Petrović	7	6
8	(India) Sumit Nagal	5	2

Final
1	(Bolivia) Hugo Dellien	7	6
(Serbia) Danilo Petrović	5	4

=== Top half ===
==== Section 1 ====
First round
ITF	(Italy) R Bonadio	4	6	6
(Croatia) B Gojo	6	0	2
(Argentina) R Olivo	6	6
(Dominican Republic) R Cid Subervi	1	2
ITF	(France) C Denolly	3	4
(Bulgaria) D Kuzmanov	6	6
Q	(Slovakia) A Molčan	6	6
WC	(Italy) G Zeppieri	1	1

Second round
1	(Bolivia) H Dellien	6	6
ITF	(Italy) R Bonadio	4	4
(Argentina) R Olivo	6	6
13	(Netherlands) S Griekspoor	2	4
LL	(Italy) Riccardo Balzerani	2	6	6
(Bulgaria) D Kuzmanov	6	2	3
Q	(Slovakia) A Molčan	4	1
6	(Spain) T Robredo	6	6

Third round
1	(Bolivia) H Dellien	6	6^{4}	6
(Argentina) R Olivo	2	7^{7}	3
LL	(Italy) R Balzerani	2	3
6	(Spain) T Robredo	6	6

Quarterfinals
1	(Bolivia) H Dellien	6	6
6	(Spain) T Robredo	2	3

==== Section 2 ====
First round
WC	(Italy) L Musetti	7^{7}	6
(Russia) P Kotov	6^{2}	3
WC	(Italy) F Forti	6	6
(Bosnia and Herzegovina) T Brkić	3	2
(El Salvador) M Arévalo	6	6
ITF	(Spain) O Roca Batalla	3	4
(France) A Müller	6	3	6
(France) S Robert	0	6	2

Second round
3	(Japan) T Daniel	1	0
WC	(Italy) L Musetti	6	6
WC	(Italy) F Forti	4	2
16	(Dominican Republic) J Hernández-Fernández	6	6
11	(Australia) M Banes	1	4
(El Salvador) M Arévalo	6	6
(France) A Müller	6	6
7	(France) E Benchetrit	3	2

Third round
WC	(Italy) L Musetti	7	3
16	(Dominican Republic) J Hernández-Fernández	5	0^{r}
(El Salvador) M Arévalo	6	6
(France) A Müller	2	3

Quarterfinals
WC	(Italy) L Musetti	7^{7}	6
(El Salvador) M Arévalo	6^{4}	2

=== Bottom half ===
==== Section 3 ====
First round
(Serbia) D Petrović	4	6	6
(Netherlands) J Sels	6	3	4
(Croatia) N Serdarušić	7^{7}	6
(Brazil) G Clezar	6^{2}	4
(Argentina) A Collarini	2	6	4
(Portugal) F Ferreira Silva	6	0	6
ITF	(Italy) R Brancaccio	1	6	5
WC	(Italy) J Ocleppo	6	3	7

Second round
5	(South Korea) D-h Lee	2	2
(Serbia) D Petrović	6	6
(Croatia) N Serdarušić	6	6
10	(France) T Lamasine	2	2
14	(Canada) F Peliwo	2	3
(Portugal) F Ferreira Silva	6	6
WC	(Italy) J Ocleppo	3	5
4	(Portugal) P Sousa	6	7

Third round
(Serbia) D Petrović	6	7
(Croatia) N Serdarušić	3	5
(Portugal) F Ferreira Silva	6	6
4	(Portugal) P Sousa	1	2

Quarterfinals
(Serbia) D Petrović	6	6
(Portugal) F Ferreira Silva	3	4

==== Section 4 ====
First round
(France) J Tatlot	7	1^{r}
(Lithuania) L Grigelis	5	4
(Ecuador) G Escobar	4	3
(Uruguay) M Cuevas	6	6
Q	(Russia) A Karatsev	6	6
(United States) E King	4	4
(Germany) S Fanselow	7	7^{7}
ITF	(Belgium) Christopher Heyman	5	6^{5}

Second round
8	(India) S Nagal	6	6
(Lithuania) L Grigelis	2	3
(Uruguay) M Cuevas	6	2	6
12	(Spain) M Vilella Martínez	3	6	4
15	(Italy) GM Moroni	5	1
Q	(Russia) A Karatsev	7	6
(Germany) S Fanselow	6	7
2/WC	(Italy) P Lorenzi	4	5

Third round
8	(India) S Nagal	6	2
(Uruguay) M Cuevas	3	1^{r}
Q	(Russia) A Karatsev	6	6
(Germany) S Fanselow	4	2

Quarterfinals
8	(India) S Nagal	6	7^{7}
Q	(Russia) A Karatsev	4	6^{4}
