= 2014 Aspria Tennis Cup =

- Date: 16–22 June
- Edition: 9th
- Draw: 32S / 16D
- Prize money: €30,000+H
- Surface: Clay
- Location: Milan, Italy

Champions

Singles
- (Spain) Albert Ramos

Doubles
- (Argentina) Guillermo Durán / (Argentina) Máximo González
← 2013 ·	Aspria Tennis Cup	· 2015 →

The 2014 Aspria Tennis Cup was a professional tennis tournament played on clay courts. It was the ninth edition of the tournament which was part of the 2014 ATP Challenger Tour. It took place in Milan, Italy between 16 and 22 June 2014.

== Singles main-draw entrants ==
=== Seeds ===
Country	Player	Rank^{1}	Seed
ESP	Pere Riba	87	1
ITA	Filippo Volandri	98	2
ESP	Albert Ramos	115	3
ARG	Facundo Argüello	117	4
ARG	Máximo González	128	5
ITA	Marco Cecchinato	145	6
ROU	Adrian Ungur	158	7
ITA	Potito Starace	176	8

- ^{1} Rankings are as of June 9, 2014.

=== Other entrants ===
The following players received wildcards into the singles main draw:

- (Italy) Roberto Marcora
- (Bolivia) Hugo Dellien
- (Japan) Yoshihito Nishioka
- (Spain) Juan Lizariturry

The following players received entry from the qualifying draw:

- (Italy) Federico Gaio
- (Italy) Filippo Baldi
- (Italy) Matteo Donati
- (Italy) Gianluca Mager

The following player received entry as special exempt:

- (Switzerland) Michael Lammer
- (France) Gianni Mina

== Doubles main-draw entrants ==
=== Seeds ===
Country	Player	Country	Player	Rank^{1}	Seed
ARG	Guillermo Durán	ARG	Máximo González	181	1
COL	Nicolás Barrientos	COL	Juan Carlos Spir	249	2
BLR	Sergey Betov	BLR	Aliaksandr Bury	293	3
USA	James Cerretani	GER	Frank Moser	302	4

- ^{1} Rankings as of June 9, 2014.

=== Other entrants ===
The following pairs received wildcards into the doubles main draw:

- (Italy) Filippo Baldi / (Italy) Matteo Donati
- (Italy) Eugenio Gibertini / (Italy) Vito Gioia
- (Italy) Alberto Brizzi / (Italy) Riccardo Sinicropi

== Champions ==
=== Singles ===
- (Spain) Albert Ramos def. (Spain) Pere Riba, 6–3, 7–5

=== Doubles ===
- (Argentina) Guillermo Durán / (Argentina) Máximo González def. (United States) James Cerretani / (Germany) Frank Moser, 6–3, 6–3
