= 2017 Aspria Tennis Cup – Singles =

Singles
- 2017 Aspria Tennis Cup

Final
- Champion: (Argentina) Guido Pella
- Runner-up: (Argentina) Federico Delbonis
- Score: 6–2, 2–1 ret.

Events
Singles	Doubles
← 2016 ·	Aspria Tennis Cup	· 2018 →

Marco Cecchinato was the defending champion but lost in the semifinals to Federico Delbonis.

Guido Pella won the title after Delbonis retired trailing 2–6, 1–2.

== Seeds ==
1. (Italy) Marco Cecchinato (semifinals)
2. (Brazil) Thiago Monteiro (first round)
3. (Argentina) Federico Delbonis (final, retired)
4. (Portugal) Gastão Elias (first round)
5. (Argentina) Guido Pella (champion)
6. (Belgium) Arthur De Greef (first round, retired)
7. (Belarus) Uladzimir Ignatik (quarterfinals)
8. (Kazakhstan) Dmitry Popko (second round)

== Draw ==
=== Key ===
- Q = Qualifier
- WC = Wild card
- LL = Lucky loser
- Alt = Alternate
- SE = Special exempt
- PR = Protected ranking
- ITF = ITF entry
- JE = Junior exempt
- w/o = Walkover
- r = Retired
- d = Defaulted
- SR = Special ranking

=== Finals ===
Semifinals
1	(Italy) Marco Cecchinato	1	6	0
3	(Argentina) Federico Delbonis	6	4	6
5	(Argentina) Guido Pella	6	6
(Spain) Tommy Robredo	3	4

Final
3	(Argentina) Federico Delbonis	2	1^{r}
5	(Argentina) Guido Pella	6	2

=== Top half ===
First round
1	(Italy) M Cecchinato	5	7	7^{7}
(Lithuania) L Grigelis	7	5	6^{5}
(France) J Eysseric	6	1	6
(France) M Hamou	1	6	3
WC	(Italy) Lorenzo Frigerio	3	1
Q	(Argentina) JI Londero	6	6
Alt	(Argentina) A Collarini	6	5
6	(Belgium) A De Greef	3	2^{r}
3	(Argentina) F Delbonis	6	6
(Australia) C O'Connell	3	1
SE	(Australia) A Bolt	5	4
(Czech Republic) Z Kolář	7	6
WC	(Italy) Gianluca Di Nicola	6	4	6
SE	(Israel) E Leshem	2	6	1
Q	(Brazil) JP Sorgi	4	4
7	(Belarus) U Ignatik	6	6

Second round
1	(Italy) M Cecchinato	6^{2}	7^{7}	6
(France) J Eysseric	7^{7}	6^{4}	1
Q	(Argentina) JI Londero	3	7	6
Alt	(Argentina) A Collarini	6	5	4
3	(Argentina) F Delbonis	6	5	6
(Czech Republic) Z Kolář	3	7	4
WC	(Italy) G Di Nicola	4	4
7	(Belarus) U Ignatik	6	6

Quarterfinals
1	(Italy) M Cecchinato	6	6
Q	(Argentina) JI Londero	2	3
3	(Argentina) F Delbonis	6	6
7	(Belarus) U Ignatik	1	4

Semifinals
1	(Italy) M Cecchinato	1	6	0
3	(Argentina) F Delbonis	6	4	6

=== Bottom half ===
First round
5	(Argentina) G Pella	6	7^{7}
(Spain) P Martínez	1	6^{5}
Q	(Argentina) JP Paz	2	2
(Serbia) P Krstin	6	6
WC	(Italy) G Mager	3	7	6
(France) L Lokoli	6	5	3
(Slovenia) B Rola	6	3	6
4	(Portugal) G Elias	3	6	4
8	(Kazakhstan) D Popko	6	0
WC	(Italy) L Caruana	3	0^{r}
(France) C Lestienne	5	7^{9}	3
(Dominican Republic) J Hernández-Fernández	7	6^{7}	6
(Spain) T Robredo	6	6
Q	(Spain) D Muñoz de la Nava	2	4
(Brazil) G Clezar	6	6
2	(Brazil) T Monteiro	3	3

Second round
5	(Argentina) G Pella	5	6	6
(Serbia) P Krstin	7	1	1
WC	(Italy) G Mager	6	6^{2}	6
(Slovenia) B Rola	4	7^{7}	0
8	(Kazakhstan) D Popko	2	3
(Dominican Republic) J Hernández-Fernández	6	6
(Spain) T Robredo	6^{5}	7^{7}	6
(Brazil) G Clezar	7^{7}	6^{3}	3

Quarterfinals
5	(Argentina) G Pella	6	6
WC	(Italy) G Mager	1	1
(Dominican Republic) J Hernández-Fernández	3	4
(Spain) T Robredo	6	6

Semifinals
5	(Argentina) G Pella	6	6
(Spain) T Robredo	3	4
