= 2015 Aspria Tennis Cup – Singles =

Singles
- 2015 Aspria Tennis Cup

Final
- Champion: (Argentina) Federico Delbonis
- Runner-up: (Brazil) Rogério Dutra Silva
- Score: 6–1, 7–6^{(8–6)}

Events
Singles	Doubles
← 2014 ·	Aspria Tennis Cup	· 2016 →

Albert Ramos Viñolas was the defending champion, but he did not participate this year.
Federico Delbonis won the title, defeating Rogério Dutra Silva, 6–1, 7–6^{(8–6)} in the final.

== Seeds ==
1. (France) Benoît Paire (quarterfinals)
2. (Argentina) Federico Delbonis (champion)
3. (Slovenia) Blaž Kavčič (second round)
4. (Italy) Marco Cecchinato (semifinals)
5. (Kazakhstan) Andrey Golubev (second round)
6. (Serbia) Laslo Djere (quarterfinals)
7. (India) Ramkumar Ramanathan (first round)
8. (Italy) Filippo Volandri (quarterfinals)

== Draw ==
=== Key ===
- Q = Qualifier
- WC = Wild card
- LL = Lucky loser
- Alt = Alternate
- SE = Special exempt
- PR = Protected ranking
- ITF = ITF entry
- JE = Junior exempt
- w/o = Walkover
- r = Retired
- d = Defaulted
- SR = Special ranking

=== Finals ===
Semifinals
Q	(Brazil) Rogério Dutra Silva	6	6
4	(Italy) Marco Cecchinato	4	1
SE	(France) Calvin Hemery	2	4
2	(Argentina) Federico Delbonis	6	6

Final
Q	(Brazil) Rogério Dutra Silva	1	6^{6}
2	(Argentina) Federico Delbonis	6	7^{8}

=== Top half ===
First round
1/Q	(France) B Paire	6^{5}	6	6
PR	(Spain) J Checa Calvo	7^{7}	4	3
(Croatia) M Delić	1	3
(Italy) F Gaio	6	6
(France) J Eysseric	6	2	6
(Brazil) F de Paula	4	6	2
Q	(Brazil) R Dutra Silva	6	6
7	(India) R Ramanathan	2	2
4	(Italy) M Cecchinato	6	6
(Colombia) N Barrientos	2	4
(Chile) JC Sáez	6	6
WC	(Italy) F Baldi	3	0
Q	(Italy) F Cipolla	1	6	6
WC	(Italy) G Quinzi	6	4	1
WC	(Italy) Pietro Licciardi	6^{4}	1
5	(Kazakhstan) A Golubev	7^{7}	6

Second round
1/Q	(France) B Paire	2	6	7^{7}
(Italy) F Gaio	6	4	6^{5}
(France) J Eysseric	0	1
Q	(Brazil) R Dutra Silva	6	6
4	(Italy) M Cecchinato	7	6
(Chile) JC Sáez	5	3
Q	(Italy) F Cipolla	6	6
5	(Kazakhstan) A Golubev	4	4

Quarterfinals
1/Q	(France) B Paire	4	4
Q	(Brazil) R Dutra Silva	6	6
4	(Italy) M Cecchinato	6	6
Q	(Italy) F Cipolla	3	2

Semifinals
Q	(Brazil) R Dutra Silva	6	6
4	(Italy) M Cecchinato	4	1

=== Bottom half ===
First round
8	(Italy) F Volandri	3	6	6
(Spain) O Roca Batalla	6	3	1
(Bosnia and Herzegovina) T Brkić	5	6	6
(Poland) G Panfil	7	2	4
(Spain) J Samper Montaña	3	4
SE	(France) C Hemery	6	6
(Germany) P Torebko	6	1	4
3	(Slovenia) B Kavčič	4	6	6
6/Q	(Serbia) L Djere	6	6
(Italy) R Bellotti	4	3
(Bolivia) H Dellien	1	2
(Italy) G Naso	6	6
(France) Jules Marie	2	3
WC	(Italy) G Mager	6	6
(Chile) C Garin	3	4
2	(Argentina) F Delbonis	6	6

Second round
8	(Italy) F Volandri	6	6
(Bosnia and Herzegovina) T Brkić	2	4
SE	(France) C Hemery	6	6
3	(Slovenia) B Kavčič	3	2
6/Q	(Serbia) L Djere	6	7^{7}
(Italy) G Naso	1	6^{4}
WC	(Italy) G Mager	5	4
2	(Argentina) F Delbonis	7	6

Quarterfinals
8	(Italy) F Volandri	0	6	4
SE	(France) C Hemery	6	1	6
6/Q	(Serbia) L Djere	6^{4}	3
2	(Argentina) F Delbonis	7^{7}	6

Semifinals
SE	(France) C Hemery	2	4
2	(Argentina) F Delbonis	6	6
