= 2016 Aspria Tennis Cup =

- Date: 20–26 June
- Edition: 11th
- Draw: 32S / 16D
- Prize money: €42,500+H
- Surface: Clay
- Location: Milan, Italy

Champions

Singles
- (Italy) Marco Cecchinato

Doubles
- (Mexico) Miguel Ángel Reyes-Varela / (United States) Max Schnur
← 2015 ·	Aspria Tennis Cup	· 2017 →

The 2016 Aspria Tennis Cup was a professional clay court tennis tournament that took place in Milan from 20–26 June. It was the 11th edition of the tournament and a part of the 2016 ATP Challenger Tour.

== Singles main-draw entrants ==
=== Seeds ===
Country	Player	Rank^{1}	Seed
BRA	Rogério Dutra Silva	82	1
POR	Gastão Elias	91	2
ESP	Roberto Carballés Baena	111	3
ARG	Carlos Berlocq	119	4
ITA	Marco Cecchinato	135	5
COL	Alejandro González	147	6
CHI	Gonzalo Lama	163	7
ESP	Daniel Gimeno Traver	173	8

- ^{1} Rankings are as of June 13, 2016.

=== Other entrants ===
The following players received wildcards into the singles main draw:

- (Italy) Matteo Donati
- (Italy) Edoardo Eremin
- (Italy) Gianluca Mager
- (Italy) Gianluigi Quinzi

The following player received entry into the singles main draw as a special exempt:

- (Argentina) Juan Ignacio Londero

The following players received entry as alternates:

- (Ecuador) Emilio Gómez
- (Russia) Aslan Karatsev
- (Germany) Maximilian Marterer

The following players received entry from the qualifying draw:

- (Italy) Andrea Basso
- (Chile) Nicolás Jarry
- (Czech Republic) Václav Šafránek
- (Italy) Lorenzo Sonego

== Champions ==
=== Singles ===
- (Italy) Marco Cecchinato def. (Serbia) Laslo Đere, 6–2, 6–2

=== Doubles ===
- (Mexico) Miguel Ángel Reyes-Varela / (United States) Max Schnur def. (Italy) Alessandro Motti / (Chinese Taipei) Peng Hsien-yin, 1–6, 7–6^{(7–4)}, [10–5]
