= 2017 Aspria Tennis Cup – Doubles =

Doubles
- 2017 Aspria Tennis Cup

Final
- Champions: (Poland) Tomasz Bednarek (Netherlands) David Pel
- Runners-up: (Italy) Filippo Baldi (Italy) Omar Giacalone
- Score: 6–1, 6–1

Events
Singles	Doubles
- Aspria Tennis Cup

Miguel Ángel Reyes-Varela and Max Schnur were the defending champions but chose not to defend their title.

Tomasz Bednarek and David Pel won the title after defeating Filippo Baldi and Omar Giacalone 6–1, 6–1 in the final.

== Seeds ==
1. (France) Jonathan Eysseric / (Ukraine) Denys Molchanov (semifinals)
2. (Belgium) Sander Gillé / (Belgium) Joran Vliegen (first round)
3. (Australia) Steven de Waard / (New Zealand) Ben McLachlan (first round)
4. (Australia) Rameez Junaid / (Switzerland) Luca Margaroli (quarterfinals)

== Draw ==
Key

- Q = Qualifier
- WC = Wild card
- LL = Lucky loser
- Alt = Alternate
- ITF = ITF entry
- PR = Protected ranking
- SR = Special ranking
- SE = Special exempt
- JE = Junior exempt
- JR = Junior Accelerator Programme entrant
- CO = College Accelerator Programme entrant
- NG = Next Gen Accelerator Program entrant
- w/o = Walkover
- r = Retired
- d = Defaulted

First round
1	(France) J Eysseric (Ukraine) D Molchanov	6	6
(Spain) P Martínez (Netherlands) M Vervoort	2	2
(Sweden) I Arvidsson (Italy) A Motti	3	2
(Australia) Jarryd Chaplin (Philippines) R Gonzales	6	6
4	(Australia) R Junaid (Switzerland) L Margaroli	6	6
(Brazil) F de Paula (Brazil) F Neis	4	1
WC	(Italy) F Baldi (Italy) Omar Giacalone	w/o
PR	(Belarus) U Ignatik (Spain) D Muñoz de la Nava
(Poland) T Bednarek (Netherlands) D Pel	6	6
WC	(Italy) Stefano Landonio (Italy) P Maldini	1	1
(Lithuania) L Grigelis (Czech Republic) Z Kolář	6	6
3	(Australia) S de Waard (New Zealand) B McLachlan	3	3
(United States) S Bangoura (Japan) T Matsui	3	1
WC	(Italy) Gianluca Di Nicola (Italy) GM Moroni	6	6
(Monaco) R Arneodo (Italy) R Ghedin	6	6
2	(Belgium) S Gillé (Belgium) J Vliegen	4	1

Quarterfinals
1	(France) J Eysseric (Ukraine) D Molchanov	6	6
(Australia) J Chaplin (Philippines) R Gonzales	3	2
4	(Australia) R Junaid (Switzerland) L Margaroli	4	6	[7]
WC	(Italy) F Baldi (Italy) O Giacalone	6	1	[10]
(Poland) T Bednarek (Netherlands) D Pel	6	7
(Lithuania) L Grigelis (Czech Republic) Z Kolář	2	5
WC	(Italy) G Di Nicola (Italy) GM Moroni	1	6	[11]
(Monaco) R Arneodo (Italy) R Ghedin	6	1	[9]

Semifinals
1	(France) J Eysseric (Ukraine) D Molchanov	0	4
WC	(Italy) F Baldi (Italy) O Giacalone	6	6
(Poland) T Bednarek (Netherlands) D Pel	7^{7}	6
WC	(Italy) G Di Nicola (Italy) GM Moroni	6^{5}	4

Final
WC	(Italy) F Baldi (Italy) O Giacalone	1	1
(Poland) T Bednarek (Netherlands) D Pel	6	6
