= 2018 Aspria Tennis Cup =

- Date: 25 June – 1 July
- Edition: 13th
- Draw: 32S / 16D
- Surface: Clay
- Location: Milan, Italy

Champions

Singles
- (Serbia) Laslo Đere

Doubles
- (Italy) Julian Ocleppo / (Italy) Andrea Vavassori
- Aspria Tennis Cup

The 2018 Aspria Tennis Cup was a professional tennis tournament played on clay courts. It was the thirteenth edition of the tournament which was part of the 2018 ATP Challenger Tour. It took place in Milan, Italy between 25 June and 1 July 2018.

== Singles main-draw entrants ==
=== Seeds ===
Country	Player	Rank^{1}	Seed
SRB	Laslo Đere	91	1
POR	Pedro Sousa	131	2
BRA	Rogério Dutra Silva	137	3
CAN	Félix Auger-Aliassime	172	4
ARG	Carlos Berlocq	174	5
SRB	Peđa Krstin	214	6
ITA	Gianluigi Quinzi	216	7
ESP	Nicola Kuhn	226	8

- ^{1} Rankings are as of 18 June 2018.

=== Other entrants ===
The following players received wildcards into the singles main draw:

- (Italy) Filippo Baldi
- (Italy) Riccardo Balzerani
- (Italy) Julian Ocleppo
- (Italy) Andrea Pellegrino

The following players received entry into the singles main draw as special exempts:

- (Netherlands) Thiemo de Bakker
- (Netherlands) Scott Griekspoor

The following player received entry into the singles main draw as an alternate:

- (Italy) Federico Gaio

The following players received entry from the qualifying draw:

- (France) Hugo Grenier
- (Italy) Gianluca Mager
- (Australia) Alexei Popyrin
- (Spain) Jordi Samper-Montaña

== Champions ==
=== Singles ===
- (Serbia) Laslo Đere def. (Italy) Gianluca Mager 6–2, 6–1.

=== Doubles ===
- (Italy) Julian Ocleppo / (Italy) Andrea Vavassori def. (Ecuador) Gonzalo Escobar / (Brazil) Fernando Romboli 4–6, 6–1, [11–9].
