= 2013 International German Open – Singles =

Singles
- 2013 International German Open

Final
- Champion: (Italy) Fabio Fognini
- Runner-up: (Argentina) Federico Delbonis
- Score: 4–6, 7–6^{(10–8)}, 6–2

Details
- Draw: 56
- Seeds: 18

Events
Singles	Doubles
- International German Open

Juan Mónaco was the defending champion but lost to Nicolás Almagro in the quarterfinals.
Fabio Fognini defeated qualifier Federico Delbonis 4–6, 7–6^{(10–8)}, 6–2 to win his first ATP World Tour 500 event and second career title in as many weeks.

== Seeds ==
All seeds receive a bye into the second round.

1. (Switzerland) Roger Federer (semifinals)
2. (Germany) Tommy Haas (quarterfinals)
3. (Spain) Nicolás Almagro (semifinals)
4. (Poland) Jerzy Janowicz (third round, retired)
5. (Argentina) Juan Mónaco (quarterfinals)
6. (Italy) Andreas Seppi (second round)
7. (Ukraine) Alexandr Dolgopolov (second round)
8. (France) Jérémy Chardy (second round)
9. (France) Benoît Paire (third round)
10. (Spain) Tommy Robredo (second round)
11. (Spain) Feliciano López (third round)
12. (Italy) Fabio Fognini (champion)
13. (Russia) Mikhail Youzhny (second round)
14. (Spain) Fernando Verdasco (quarterfinals)
15. (Latvia) Ernests Gulbis (second round)
16. (Slovakia) Martin Kližan (second round)

== Draw ==
Key

- Q = Qualifier
- WC = Wild card
- LL = Lucky loser
- Alt = Alternate
- ITF = ITF entry
- PR = Protected ranking
- SR = Special ranking
- SE = Special exempt
- JE = Junior exempt
- JR = Junior Accelerator Programme entrant
- CO = College Accelerator Programme entrant
- NG = Next Gen Accelerator Program entrant
- w/o = Walkover
- r = Retired
- d = Defaulted

=== Finals ===
Quarterfinals
1/WC	(Switzerland) Roger Federer	7^{7}	3	7
(Germany) Florian Mayer	6^{4}	6	5
14	(Spain) Fernando Verdasco	7^{7}	6^{8}	4
Q	(Argentina) Federico Delbonis	6^{5}	7^{10}	6
5	(Argentina) Juan Mónaco	6	0	3
3	(Spain) Nicolás Almagro	4	6	6
12	(Italy) Fabio Fognini	6	6
2	(Germany) Tommy Haas	2	4

Semifinals
1/WC	(Switzerland) Roger Federer	6^{7}	6^{4}
Q	(Argentina) Federico Delbonis	7^{9}	7^{7}
3	(Spain) Nicolás Almagro	4	6^{1}
12	(Italy) Fabio Fognini	6	7^{7}

Final
Q	(Argentina) Federico Delbonis	6	6^{8}	2
12	(Italy) Fabio Fognini	4	7^{10}	6

=== Top half ===
==== Section 1 ====
First round
(Italy) P Lorenzi	5	3
(Germany) D Brands	7	6
Q	(Poland) Ł Kubot	3	2
Q	(Czech Republic) J Hájek	6	6
(Argentina) L Mayer	6	4	4
WC	(Germany) J-L Struff	3	6	6
(Russia) N Davydenko	1	3
(Germany) F Mayer	6	6

Second round
1/WC	(Switzerland) R Federer	3	6	6
(Germany) D Brands	6	3	2
Q	(Czech Republic) J Hájek	6	2	6
15	(Latvia) E Gulbis	4	6	4
11	(Spain) F López	7	6
WC	(Germany) J-L Struff	5	3
(Germany) F Mayer	6	6
7	(Ukraine) A Dolgopolov	3	4

Third round
1/WC	(Switzerland) R Federer	6	6
Q	(Czech Republic) J Hájek	4	3
11	(Spain) F López	6^{1}	2
(Germany) F Mayer	7^{7}	6

Quarterfinals
1/WC	(Switzerland) R Federer	7^{7}	3	7
(Germany) F Mayer	6^{4}	6	5

==== Section 2 ====
First round
Q	(Argentina) DS Schwartzman	6^{3}	6	5
(Netherlands) R Haase	7^{7}	4	7
WC	(Germany) A Zverev	3	2
(Spain) R Baustista-Agut	6	6
Q	(Argentina) F Delbonis	6	6
WC	(Germany) J Reister	3	3
(Spain) P Andújar	7^{7}	6^{4}	2
(Russia) D Tursunov	6^{5}	7^{7}	6

Second round
4	(Poland) J Janowicz	6	3	7^{7}
(Netherlands) R Haase	4	6	6^{4}
(Spain) R Bautista Agut	4	6	2
14	(Spain) F Verdasco	6	3	6
10	(Spain) T Robredo	1	6	4
Q	(Argentina) F Delbonis	6	4	6
(Russia) D Tursunov	6	7^{7}
8	(France) J Chardy	4	6^{1}

Third round
4	(Poland) J Janowicz	5	0^{r}
14	(Spain) F Verdasco	7	4
Q	(Argentina) F Delbonis	6	6
(Russia) D Tursunov	4	3

Quarterfinals
14	(Spain) F Verdasco	7^{7}	6^{8}	4
Q	(Argentina) F Delbonis	6^{5}	7^{10}	6

=== Bottom half ===
==== Section 3 ====
First round
(France) G Monfils	6	6
Q	(Kazakhstan) A Golubev	3	3
(France) P-H Mathieu	4	4
(Spain) A Montañés	6	6
(Spain) G García López	6	6
(Spain) D Gimeno Traver	3	3
(Germany) T Kamke	6	6
(Czech Republic) L Rosol	3	0

Second round
5	(Argentina) J Mónaco	6	6
(France) G Monfils	4	4
(Spain) A Montañés	1	4
9	(France) B Paire	6	6
13	(Russia) M Youzhny	3	7^{7}	2
(Spain) G García López	6	6^{3}	6
(Germany) T Kamke	3	3
3	(Spain) N Almagro	6	6

Third round
5	(Argentina) J Mónaco	6	2	6
9	(France) B Paire	3	6	2
(Spain) G García López	2	3
3	(Spain) N Almagro	6	6

Quarterfinals
5	(Argentina) J Mónaco	6	0	3
3	(Spain) N Almagro	4	6	6

==== Section 4 ====
First round
(Spain) M Granollers	6	5	6
(Brazil) T Bellucci	3	7	3
(Argentina) H Zeballos	6^{7}	6^{4}
(Spain) A Ramos	7^{9}	7^{7}
(Argentina) C Berlocq	6^{5}	6	6
WC	(Germany) M Bachinger	7^{7}	1	2
Q	(Slovenia) B Kavčič	4	6	6
(Romania) V Hănescu	6	4	1

Second round
6	(Italy) A Seppi	2	6	1
(Spain) M Granollers	6	1	6
(Spain) A Ramos	1	3
12	(Italy) F Fognini	6	6
16	(Slovakia) M Kližan	6	1	6^{6}
(Argentina) C Berlocq	4	6	7^{8}
Q	(Slovenia) B Kavčič	1	6	4
2	(Germany) T Haas	6	4	6

Third round
(Spain) M Granollers	2	4
12	(Italy) F Fognini	6	6
(Argentina) C Berlocq	2	4
2	(Germany) T Haas	6	6

Quarterfinals
12	(Italy) F Fognini	6	6
2	(Germany) T Haas	2	4

== Qualifying ==
=== Seeds ===
1. (Poland) Łukasz Kubot (qualified)
2. (Romania) Adrian Ungur (qualifying competition)
3. (Ukraine) Sergiy Stakhovsky (first round)
4. (Italy) Filippo Volandri (first round)
5. (Argentina) Martín Alund (first round)
6. (Argentina) Federico Delbonis (qualified)
7. (Brazil) João Souza (qualifying competition)
8. (Czech Republic) Jan Hájek (qualified)
9. (Slovenia) Blaž Kavčič (qualified)
10. (Argentina) Diego Schwartzman (qualified)
11. (Kazakhstan) Andrey Golubev (qualified)
12. (Spain) Daniel Muñoz de la Nava (qualifying competition)

=== Qualifiers ===
1. (Poland) Łukasz Kubot
2. (Argentina) Diego Sebastián Schwartzman
3. (Kazakhstan) Andrey Golubev
4. (Czech Republic) Jan Hájek
5. (Slovenia) Blaž Kavčič
6. (Argentina) Federico Delbonis

=== Qualifying draw ===
==== First qualifier ====
First round
1	(Poland) Łukasz Kubot	7	5	6
WC	(Germany) Kevin Krawietz	5	7	4
(Kazakhstan) Yuri Schukin	3	0^{r}
7	(Brazil) João Souza	6	0

Qualifying competition
1	(Poland) Łukasz Kubot	7	4	6
7	(Brazil) João Souza	6	6	2

==== Second qualifier ====
First round
2	(Romania) Adrian Ungur	6	6
(Czech Republic) Ivo Minář	2	3
WC	(Germany) Florian Barth	5	1
10	(Argentina) Diego Schwartzman	7	6

Qualifying competition
2	(Romania) Adrian Ungur	6^{2}	3
10	(Argentina) Diego Schwartzman	7^{7}	6

==== Third qualifier ====
First round
3	(Ukraine) Sergiy Stakhovsky	6^{3}	0
(Germany) Cedrik-Marcel Stebe	7^{7}	6
WC	(Germany) Frederik Press	1	1
11	(Kazakhstan) Andrey Golubev	6	6

Qualifying competition
(Germany) Cedrik-Marcel Stebe	4	2
11	(Kazakhstan) Andrey Golubev	6	6

==== Fourth qualifier ====
First round
4	(Italy) Filippo Volandri	4	2
(Slovakia) Pavol Červenák	6	6
WC	(Germany) Maximilian Marterer	3	4
8	(Czech Republic) Jan Hájek	6	6

Qualifying competition
(Slovakia) Pavol Červenák	4	5
8	(Czech Republic) Jan Hájek	6	7

==== Fifth qualifier ====
First round
5	(Argentina) Martín Alund	4	3
(Germany) Robin Kern	6	6
(Germany) Finn Meinecke	0	0
9	(Slovenia) Blaž Kavčič	6	6

Qualifying competition
(Germany) Robin Kern	1	3
9	(Slovenia) Blaž Kavčič	6	6

==== Sixth qualifier ====
First round
6	(Argentina) Federico Delbonis	6	6
(Russia) Philipp Davydenko	1	0
(France) Florent Serra	3	3
12	(Spain) Daniel Muñoz de la Nava	6	6

Qualifying competition
6	(Argentina) Federico Delbonis	7^{8}	6
12	(Spain) Daniel Muñoz de la Nava	6^{6}	4
