= Dee Ocleppo =

American fashion designer and entrepreneur

- Born: Deniz Caroline Erbuğ; November 24, 1966 (age 59); Wooster, Ohio, U.S.
- Education: Southern Methodist University
- Occupations: Fashion designer, former model, financier
- Label: Dee Ocleppo
- Spouses: Gianni Ocleppo (m. 1997; div. 2003) Tommy Hilfiger (m. 2008)
- Children: 3, including Julian

Dee Ocleppo Hilfiger (née Deniz Caroline Erbuğ; formerly Ocleppo; born November, 24 1966) is an American fashion designer and entrepreneur. She was married from 1997 to 2003 to Gianni Ocleppo, with whom she had two children, including Julian Ocleppo. Since 2008, she has been married to fashion designer Tommy Hilfiger.

== Early life and education ==
Hilfiger was born Deniz Caroline Erbuğ in Cleveland, Ohio to Vedat Erbuğ, a Turkish radiologist, and Patricia Erbuğ (née Seitter; b. 1944), a British microbiologist. Both of her parents moved to the United States to pursue their academic careers. She was raised in East Greenwich, Rhode Island. She completed a degree in communications at Southern Methodist University in Dallas, Texas.

== Career ==
Los Angeles-based photographer, videographer, and talent manager Jean Renard discovered Ocleppo Hilfiger and encouraged her to pursue modeling. Renard also discovered and managed the career of Niki Taylor. In recent years, Ocleppo Hilfiger has become most known for creating and serving as lead designer of the eponymous luxury accessory label Dee Ocleppo, which includes a line of handbags with interchangeable features.

== Dee Ocleppo Label ==
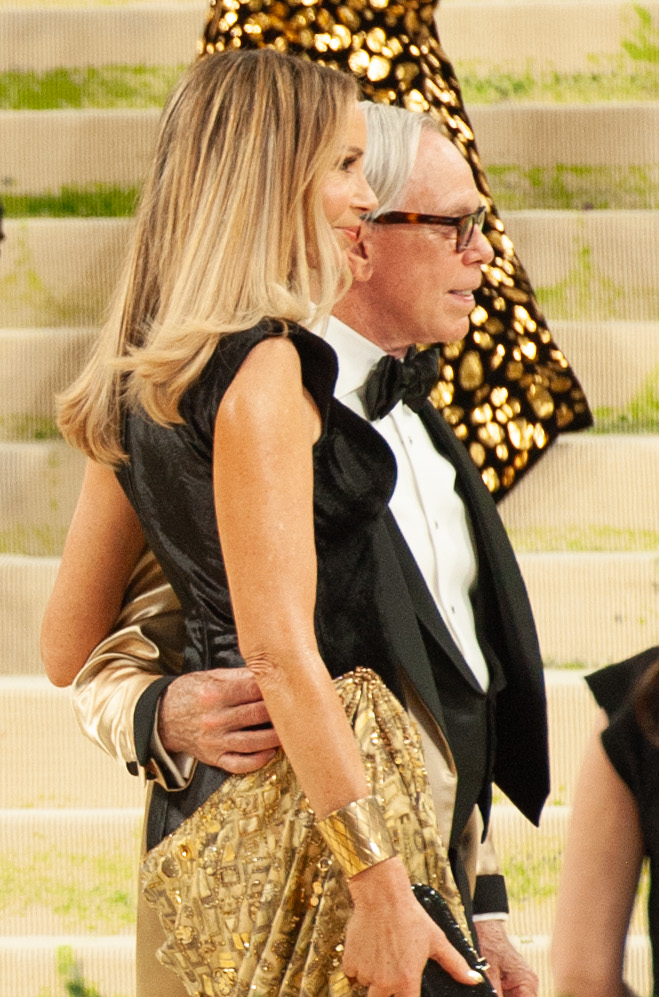
Ocleppo and Hilfiger at the 2026 Met Gala

Ocleppo Hilfiger initially suggested that her husband, Tommy Hilfiger, consider a line for his own iconic eponymous brand. However, Hilfiger convinced his wife to embark on creating a line of vintage-style luxury handbags under her own label. Among stylistic influencers of Ocleppo Hilfiger's label, she credits Lauren Hutton, Grace Kelly and her friend Iris Apfel.

Under the auspices of D.H. Designs LLC and with encouragement from HSN's CEO Mindy Grossman, Ocleppo Hilfiger launched her accessory line in 2012, selling her first handbag to the mega-retail luxury department store Harrods. She then opened a showroom at Trump Tower in Manhattan and more recently at Galeries Lafayette's flagship store in Paris.

In 2015, she launched Bag bar, which is a custom accessory system for classic handbags, which was purchased by Kate Spade and Company.

In January 2017, Ocleppo Hilfiger announced that the Dee Ocleppo brand would partner with the Judith Leiber label. As the new co-owner, she will become the brand's creative director and serve as its global ambassador.

== Awards ==
In 2016, Ocleppo Hilfiger was presented with the "Rising Star Award" by Fashion Group International, the global nonprofit authority on trending apparel, accessories, as well as beauty merchandise and home products. Celebrities who have been photographed/carrying with Dee Ocleppo handbags in recent years in include Pippa Middleton, Olivia Palermo, Beyonce, Alicia Keys.

In 2015, Ocleppo Hilfiger was awarded The National Mother’s Day Committee’s "Outstanding Mother Awards" along with Liz Rodbell, Joanna Coles, and Meredith Vieira.

On Mother's Day 2013, Ocleppo Hilfiger was the honored recipient of the "Moms 4 Mom" award by Autism Speaks in celebration of motherhood and autism advocacy.

== Personal life ==
Deniz Carolina Erbug met pop star Mick Hucknall while she was in college, dating for two years during the 1990s.

In 1997, at the age of 31, she married Gianni Ocleppo, an Italian tennis player, with whom she had had two sons, including Julian Ocleppo, raising them in Monte Carlo. They divorced in 2003.

Ocleppo met Hilfiger while vacationing with her two sons in Saint Tropez in the summer of 2005. A friendship evolved and the couple celebrated an engagement in New York City attended by numerous celebrities and public figures including Russell Simmons, Anna Wintour, and Harvey Weinstein. The Hilfigers married in 2008. Their son was born in 2009.

Ocleppo Hilfiger is the mother of seven children and stepchildren, and is a proponent of The Family Dinner Project in an effort to "revive the lost art of dinner conversation." According to her website, she encourages family discussion and discourse without the interruption of cell phones, as one small way families can build cohesion and open dialogue in an age when technology can impede family communication.
