= Federico Delbonis =

Argentine former professional tennis player

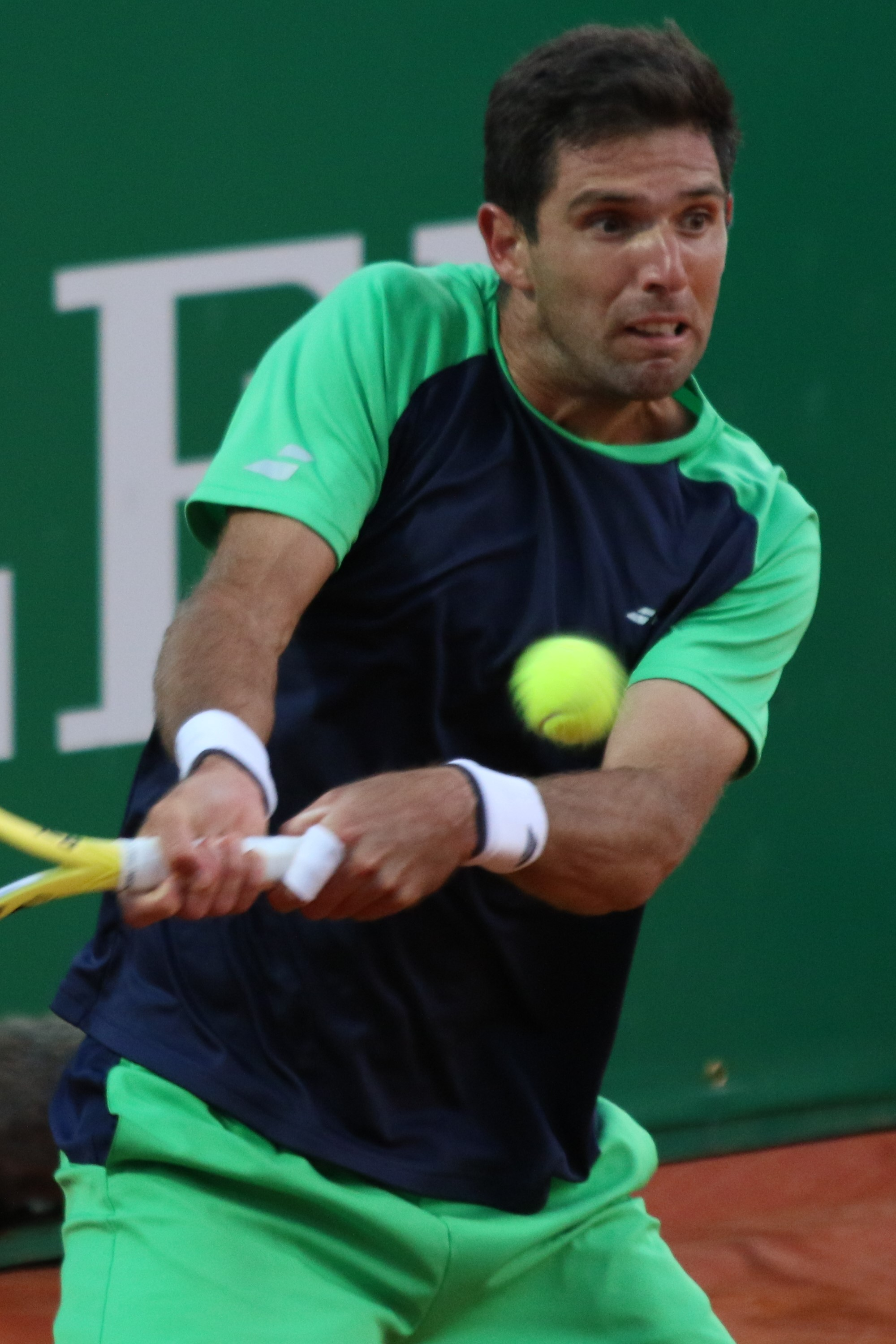
- Delbonis playing in the 2022 Monte Carlo Masters
- Country (sports): Argentina
- Residence: Azul, Argentina
- Born: 5 October 1990 (age 34); Azul, Argentina
- Height: 1.93 m (6 ft 4 in)
- Turned pro: 2007
- Retired: 2024
- Plays: Left-handed (two-handed backhand)
- Coach: Mariano Hood
- Prize money: US $6,138,770

Singles
- Career record: 164–200
- Career titles: 2
- Highest ranking: No. 33 (9 May 2016)

Grand Slam singles results
- Australian Open: 3R (2016)
- French Open: 4R (2021)
- Wimbledon: 1R (2014, 2015, 2016, 2018, 2019, 2021, 2022)
- US Open: 2R (2014, 2016)

Other tournaments
- Olympic Games: 1R (2016)

Doubles
- Career record: 60–86
- Career titles: 2
- Highest ranking: No. 110 (22 July 2019)

Grand Slam doubles results
- Australian Open: 2R (2020)
- French Open: 3R (2019)
- Wimbledon: 2R (2016, 2018)
- US Open: 2R (2015, 2019)

Other doubles tournaments
- Olympic Games: 1R (2016)

Team competitions
- Davis Cup: W (2016)
- Last updated on: 10 February 2024.

Federico Delbonis (Spanish pronunciation: [feðeˈɾiko ðelˈβonis]; (Note: In isolation, Delbonis is pronounced [delˈβonis]; The pronunciation in the reference is [feðeˈɾiko | delˈβonis] with a pause before the surname.) born 5 October 1990) is an Argentine former professional tennis player. He achieved a career-high ATP singles ranking of world No. 33 on 9 May 2016. He also reached a career-high doubles ranking of No. 110 on 22 July 2019.

Delbonis was known for his unorthodox serve, an exaggerated trophy serve in which he would raise his racquet, toss the ball unusually high and follow through.

== Professional career ==
=== 2009–2012 ===
Delbonis won five Challenger and Futures titles from the time he turned professional in 2009 until 2013. In 2011, Delbonis reached the first ATP semifinal of his career at the Mercedes Cup in Stuttgart, Germany. He won 6 consecutive matches, having to win 3 qualifying matches in order to enter the main draw, ultimately falling to Juan Carlos Ferrero in three sets.

=== 2013: First ATP final ===
He qualified at the 2013 International German Open and then beat Tommy Robredo, Dmitry Tursunov and Fernando Verdasco, the latter of which he won in a tight three-setter to set up a meeting in the semifinals with Roger Federer. Against Federer, Delbonis scored by far the biggest win of his career, defeating him in two tiebreaker to book a place in the first ATP Tour final of his career. He finished runner-up to Fabio Fognini, squandering a set and 4–1 lead and failing to convert three match points. Due to his strong performance, his tour ranking soared into the top 100 for the first time in his career.

=== 2014: First ATP title ===
In 2014 he went on to win his first ATP title when he defeated Paolo Lorenzi in three sets, at the 2014 Brasil Open. It was their first tour level match against each other, however Lorenzi has won against Delbonis in past three Challenger events. The win enabled to reach a new men's singles high ranking of 44.

=== 2016: Second ATP title, best season & top 35 debut, Davis cup winner ===
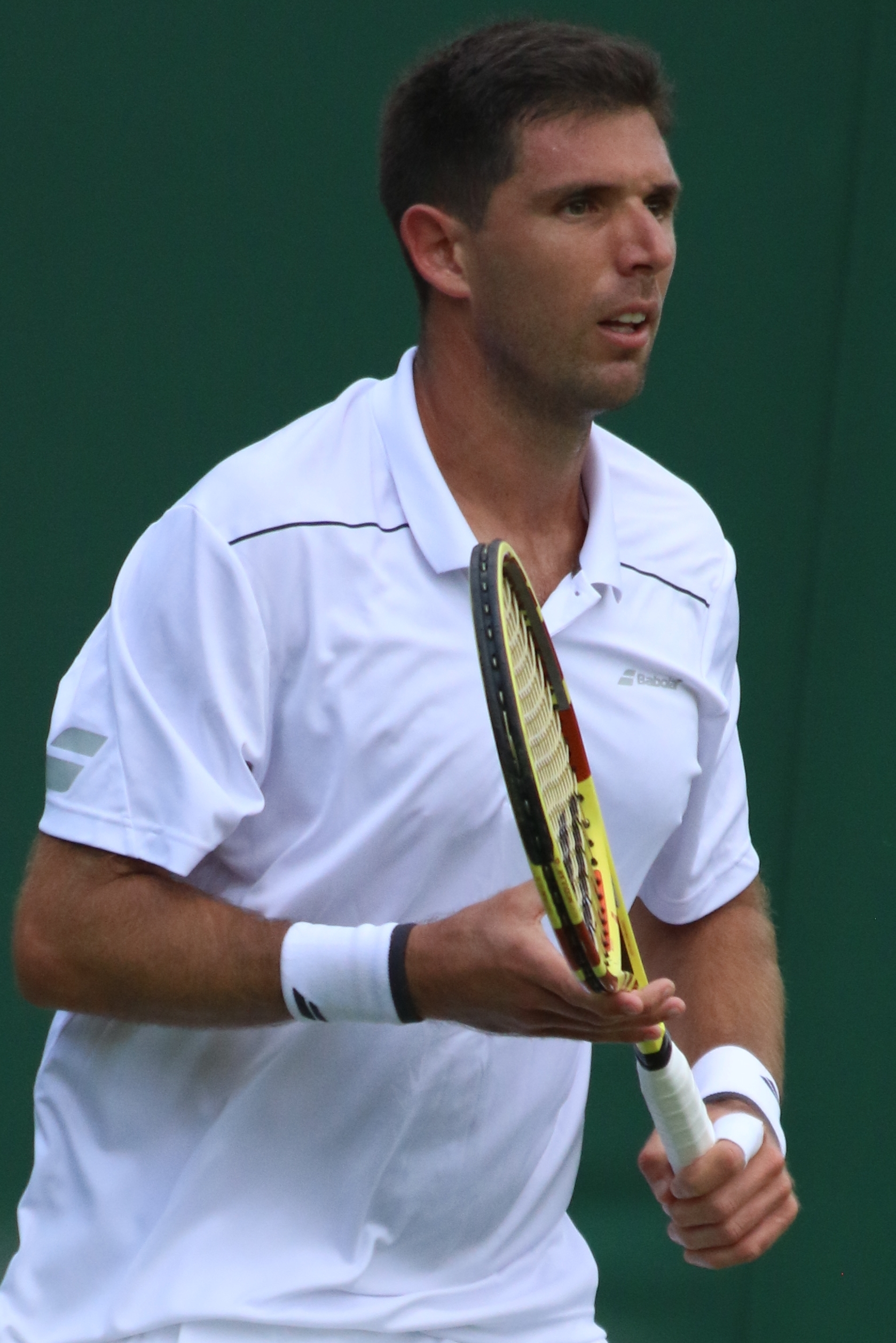
Delbonis at the 2019 Wimbledon Championships

Delbonis started his season at the 2016 Apia International Sydney. He beat Sam Groth in the first round in straight sets. In his second round he played Teymuraz Gabashvili losing in straight sets 3–6, 3–6. Delbonis then played at the first major of the year at the 2016 Australian Open. In the first round he upset 22nd seed Ivo Karlović after Karlović had to retire in the third set. Delbonis then reached the third round of a major for the first time in his career after beating Renzo Olivo in the second round in five sets. He then lost in straight sets to 14th seed Gilles Simon.

Delbonis next played at the 2016 Argentina Open. He beat 6th seed Fabio Fognini in the first round after being a set down. He lost his second round match to eventual finalist Nicolás Almagro in three sets. Delbonis played in another clay court tournament at the 2016 Rio Open. In his first round he beat 6th seed Jack Sock in straight sets. He followed this up with another win in straight sets in the second round beating Paolo Lorenzi. He then lost in the quarterfinals against eventual champion Pablo Cuevas in straight sets. He then played in his third straight clay court tournament at the 2016 Brasil Open as the 4th seed. He got a bye pass in the first round. In the second round he beat Diego Schwartzman after being a set down. In the quarterfinals he lost to Íñigo Cervantes.

Delbonis next competed at the first Masters 1000 of the year at the 2016 Indian Wells Masters. In the first round he defeated Santiago Giraldo in straight sets. In the second round he defeated 32nd seed João Sousa also in straight sets. In the third round Delbonis earned his biggest win of his career defeating 2nd seed Andy Murray in three sets. This was Delbonis's third top 10 win. In the fourth round he lost to 13th seed Gaël Monfils in straight sets 3–6, 4–6. Delbonis next competed at the 2016 Miami Open. In the first round he defeated wildcard Elias Ymer in three sets. In the second round he lost to 26th seed Grigor Dimitrov.

Delbonis next chose to compete at the 2016 Grand Prix Hassan II as the 4th seed. He received a bye pass for the first round. In the second round he defeated Thiemo de Bakker in straight sets. He then defeated 7th seed Pablo Carreño Busta in the quarterfinals also in straight sets. In the semifinals In the semifinals he defeated Albert Montañés once again in straight sets. He won his second career title without dropping a set the entire tournament by defeating 3rd seed Borna Ćorić in the final in straight sets. He then competed at the 2016 Monte-Carlo Rolex Masters. He had a disappointing loss to wildcard Fernando Verdasco 0–6, 3–6. Delbonis then played at the 2016 BRD Năstase Țiriac Trophy as the 3rd seed. He received a bye pass in the first round. In the second round he defeated Illya Marchenko in straight sets. In the quarterfinals he defeated Marco Cecchinato also in straight sets. In the semifinals he lost to Lucas Pouille 3–6, 2–6.

Delbonis then competed at the 2016 Istanbul Open as the 4th seed. He received a bye pass for the first round. In the second round he defeated Dudi Sela in three sets. In the quarterfinal he defeated Albert Ramos Viñolas in straight sets. In the semifinals he lost to eventual champion Diego Schwartzman despite winning the first set. Delbonis then competed at the 2016 Geneva Open as the 6th seed. In the first round he defeated wildcard Janko Tipsarević in straight sets. In the second round he defeated last years champion Thomaz Bellucci in straight sets. In the quarterfinals he lost to 3rd seed and eventual runner up Marin Čilić 4–6, 3–6. Delbonis next competed at the second major of the year at the 2016 French Open as the 31st seed which marks the first time Delbonis has been seeded at a major. He was eliminated in the first round losing to Pablo Carreño Busta in four sets.

Delbonis next competed at the third major of the year, the 2016 Wimbledon Championships. In the first round, he faced Fabio Fognini and lost in an epic five setter 4–6, 6–1, 7–6^{(7–3)}, 2–6, 3–6. Delbonis then played for Argentina in the Davis Cup quarterfinals against Italy. He beat Andreas Seppi and Fabio Fognini, both in four sets, to help clinch the tie 3–1. In the finals of Davis Cup, he lost against Marin Čilić in five sets but beat Ivo Karlović in straight sets in the fifth and deciding rubber to give Argentina their first Davis Cup.

=== 2021: First Masters quarterfinal, back to top 50, first Major fourth round ===
In March, Delbonis reached his 5th doubles final in 2 years since his last doubles title, at the 2021 Chile Open partnering with Jaume Munar.

In May, Delbonis reached his maiden Masters 1000 quarterfinal in singles in Rome. He defeated 12th seeded David Goffin and Félix Auger-Aliassime in the second and third round respectively. He lost to Reilly Opelka in the quarterfinals in straight sets. With his best showing at a Masters, he returned to the top 50 in the singles rankings in over 4 years, since March 2017.

In the lead-up to the French Open, Delbonis also played in the second tournament in Belgrade, where he reached the semifinals, losing to qualifier Alex Molčan.

Delbonis made his best Grand Slam run in his career by reaching the fourth round at the French Open, having never being past the second round at a Major, after defeating Radu Albot, Pablo Andújar and 27th seed Fabio Fognini. He lost to Alejandro Davidovich Fokina in the round of 16.

Delbonis made the semifinals in Hamburg, after saving 4 match points in his quarterfinal match against Benoît Paire. He then lost to Pablo Carreño Busta in straight sets.

=== 2022–2024: Loss of form, out of top 250, retirement ===
He reached the semifinals at the 2022 Argentina Open defeating again Fabio Fognini before losing to eventual champion Casper Ruud.

He recorded his only Major win for the season at the 2022 French Open against Adrian Mannarino. He lost in the first round at the 2022 Wimbledon Championships.

He qualified for the 2022 US Open, but also lost in the first round to John Isner. It was the fifth straight year Delbonis had lost in the first round of the US Open.

He dropped out of the top 200 at No. 214 on 17 April 2023 and out of the top 250 on 11 September 2023.

He announced his retirement on 29 January 2024 with his last appearance being at the 2024 Argentina Open in doubles partnering Facundo Bagnis.

== ATP career finals ==
=== Singles: 4 (2 titles, 2 runner-ups) ===
Legend Grand Slam (0-0) ATP Masters 1000 (0-0) ATP 500 Series (0–1) ATP 250 Series (2–1)	Titles by surface Hard (0–0) Clay (2–2) Grass (0–0)	Titles by setting Outdoor (1–2) Indoor (1–0)

Result	W–L	Date	Tournament	Tier	Surface	Opponent	Score
Loss	0–1	Jul 2013	German Open, Germany	500 Series	Clay	(Italy) Fabio Fognini	6–4, 6–7^{(8–10)}, 2–6
Win	1–1	Mar 2014	Brasil Open, Brazil	250 Series	Clay (i)	(Italy) Paolo Lorenzi	4–6, 6–3, 6–4
Loss	1–2	May 2014	Open de Nice Côte d'Azur, France	250 Series	Clay	(Latvia) Ernests Gulbis	1–6, 6–7^{(5–7)}
Win	2–2	Apr 2016	Grand Prix Hassan II, Morocco	250 Series	Clay	(Croatia) Borna Ćorić	6–2, 6–4

=== Doubles: 5 (2 titles, 3 runner-ups) ===
Legend Grand Slam (0-0) ATP Masters 1000 (0-0) ATP 500 Series (0-0) ATP World Tour 250 Series (2–3)	Titles by surface Hard (0–0) Clay (2–3) Grass (0–0)	Titles by setting Outdoor (0–3) Indoor (2–0)

Result	W–L	Date	Tournament	Tier	Surface	Partner	Opponents	Score
Win	1–0	Mar 2018	Brasil Open, Brazil	250 Series	Clay (i)	(Argentina) Máximo González	(Netherlands) Wesley Koolhof (New Zealand) Artem Sitak	6–4, 6–2
Loss	1–1	Aug 2018	Austrian Open Kitzbühel, Austria	250 Series	Clay	(Italy) Daniele Bracciali	(Czech Republic) Roman Jebavý (Argentina) Andrés Molteni	2–6, 4–6
Win	2–1	Mar 2019	Brasil Open, Brazil (2)	250 Series	Clay (i)	(Argentina) Máximo González	(United Kingdom) Luke Bambridge (United Kingdom) Jonny O'Mara	6–4, 6–3
Loss	2–2	Jul 2019	Swedish Open, Sweden	250 Series	Clay	(Argentina) Horacio Zeballos	(Belgium) Sander Gillé (Belgium) Joran Vliegen	7–6^{(7–5)}, 5–7, [5–10]
Loss	2–3	Mar 2021	Chile Open, Chile	250 Series	Clay	(Spain) Jaume Munar	(Italy) Simone Bolelli (Argentina) Máximo González	6–7^{(4–7)}, 4–6

== Team competitions finals ==
=== Davis Cup: 1 (1 title) ===
Outcome	Date	Tournament	Surface	Partner(s)	Opponents	Score
Win	Nov 2016	Davis Cup, Zagreb, Croatia	Hard (i)	(Argentina) Juan Martín del Potro (Argentina) Leonardo Mayer (Argentina) Guido Pella	(Croatia) Marin Čilić (Croatia) Ivo Karlović (Croatia) Ivan Dodig (Croatia) Franko Škugor	3–2

== ATP Challenger and ITF Futures Finals ==
=== Singles: 22 (12–10) ===
Legend (singles) ATP Challenger Tour (11–8) ITF Futures Tour (1–2)	Finals by surface Hard (1–0) Clay (11–10) Grass (0–0) Carpet (0–0)

Result	W–L	Date	Tournament	Tier	Surface	Opponent	Score
Win	1–0	Jan 2009	Guatemala F1, Guatemala	Futures	Hard	(Brazil) Nicolás Santos	6–3, 6–4
Loss	1–1	Mar 2009	Italy F3, Rome	Futures	Clay	(Sweden) Tim Göransson	4–6, 3–6
Loss	1–2	May 2009	Argentina F7, Córdoba	Futures	Clay	(Chile) Jorge Aguilar	3–6, 4–6
Win	2–2	Aug 2009	Manerbio, Italy	Challenger	Clay	(Portugal) Leonardo Tavares	6–1, 6–3
Loss	2–3	Apr 2010	Napoli, Italy	Challenger	Clay	(Portugal) Rui Machado	4–6, 4–6
Win	3–3	Apr 2010	Rome, Italy	Challenger	Clay	(Germany) Florian Mayer	6–3, 6–4
Loss	3–4	Jul 2010	Rimini, Italy	Challenger	Clay	(Italy) Paolo Lorenzi	2–6, 0–6
Win	4–4	Jan 2013	Bucaramanga, Colombia	Challenger	Clay	(United States) Wayne Odesnik	7–6^{(7–4)}, 6–3
Win	5–4	Apr 2013	Barranquilla, Colombia	Challenger	Clay	(Argentina) Facundo Bagnis	6–3, 6–2
Loss	5–5	Sep 2013	Liberec, Czech Republic	Challenger	Clay	(Czech Republic) Jiří Veselý	7–6^{(7–2)}, 6–7^{(9–11)}, 4–6
Win	6–5	Apr 2015	Sarasota, United States	Challenger	Clay	(Argentina) Facundo Bagnis	6–4, 6–2
Win	7–5	Jun 2015	Milan, Italy	Challenger	Clay	(Brazil) Rogério Dutra Silva	6–1, 7–6^{(8–6)}
Win	8–5	Oct 2015	Rome, Italy	Challenger	Clay	(Serbia) Filip Krajinović	1–6, 6–3, 6–4
Loss	8–6	Jun 2017	Prostějov, Czech Republic	Challenger	Clay	(Czech Republic) Jiří Veselý	7–5, 1–6, 5–7
Win	9–6	Jun 2017	Todi, Italy	Challenger	Clay	(Italy) Marco Cecchinato	7–5, 6–1
Loss	9–7	Jul 2017	Milan, Italy	Challenger	Clay	(Argentina) Guido Pella	2–6, 1–2 ret.
Win	10–7	Oct 2017	Cali, Colombia	Challenger	Clay	(Brazil) Guillherme Clezar	7–6^{(12–10)}, 7–5
Win	11–7	Sep 2018	Biella, Italy	Challenger	Clay	(Italy) Stefano Napolitano	6–4, 6–3
Loss	11–8	Oct 2018	Campinas, Brazil	Challenger	Clay	(Chile) Cristian Garín	3–6, 4–6
Loss	11–9	Oct 2018	Santo Domingo, Dominican Republic	Challenger	Clay	(Chile) Cristian Garín	4–6, 7–5, 4–6
Win	12–9	Jul 2019	Perugia, Italy	Challenger	Clay	(Spain) Guillermo García López	6–0, 1–6, 7–6^{(7–5)}
Loss	12–10	Nov 2019	Montevideo, Uruguay	Challenger	Clay	(Spain) Jaume Munar	5–7, 2–6

=== Doubles: 14 (4–10) ===
Legend (doubles) ATP Challenger Tour (4–6) ITF Futures Tour (0–4)	Finals by surface Hard (0–1) Clay (4–9) Grass (0–0) Carpet (0–0)

Result	W–L	Date	Tournament	Tier	Surface	Partner	Opponent	Score
Loss	0–1	May 2008	Spain F7, Lleida	Futures	Clay	(Spain) Pedro Clar	(Spain) Agustin Boje-Ordonez (Spain) Pablo Martin-Adalia	6–7^{(7–9)}, 5–7
Loss	0–2	Sep 2008	Argentina F10, Rosario	Futures	Clay	(Argentina) Nicolas Pastor	(Argentina) Juan-Manuel Ferrer (Argentina) Mauro Ferrer	2–6, 2–6
Loss	0–3	Mar 2009	Italy F4, Rome	Futures	Clay	(Argentina) Nicolas Pastor	(Italy) Leonardo Azzaro (Italy) Daniele Giorgini	0–6, 7–5, [3–10]
Loss	0–4	May 2009	Argentina F7, Córdoba	Futures	Clay	(Argentina) Juan Vazquez-Valenzuela	(Chile) Jorge Aguilar (Chile) Rodrigo Perez	0–0 ret.
Loss	0–5	Oct 2010	Buenos Aires, Argentina	Challenger	Clay	(Chile) Jorge Aguilar	(Argentina) Carlos Berlocq (Argentina) Brian Dabul	3–6, 2–6
Win	1–5	Mar 2011	Salinas, Ecuador	Challenger	Clay	(Argentina) Facundo Bagnis	(Brazil) Rogério Dutra Silva (Brazil) João Souza	6–2, 6–1
Loss	1–6	Jun 2011	Marburg, Germany	Challenger	Clay	(Argentina) Horacio Zeballos	(Germany) Martin Emmrich (Germany) Björn Phau	6–7^{(3–7)}, 2–6
Win	2–6	Sep 2011	Como, Italy	Challenger	Clay	(Argentina) Renzo Olivo	(Argentina) Martín Alund (Argentina) Facundo Argüello	6–1, 6–4
Win	3–6	Mar 2012	Rabat, Morocco	Challenger	Clay	(Spain) Íñigo Cervantes Huegun	(Slovakia) Martin Kližan (France) Stéphane Robert	6–7^{(3–7)}, 6–1, [10–5]
Loss	3–7	Mar 2012	Marrakech, Morocco	Challenger	Clay	(Spain) Íñigo Cervantes Huegun	(Slovakia) Martin Kližan (Spain) Daniel Muñoz de la Nava	3–6, 6–1, [10–12]
Loss	3–8	Jan 2013	São Paulo, Brazil	Challenger	Hard	(Argentina) Renzo Olivo	(United States) James Cerretani (Canada) Adil Shamasdin	7–6^{(5–7)}, 1–6, [9–11]
Loss	3–9	Mar 2013	Santiago, Chile	Challenger	Clay	(Argentina) Diego Junqueira	(Brazil) Marcelo Demoliner (Brazil) João Souza	5–7, 1–6
Loss	3–10	Mar 2013	Pereira, Colombia	Challenger	Clay	(Argentina) Facundo Bagnis	(Colombia) Nicolás Barrientos (Colombia) Eduardo Struvay	6–3, 3–6, [6–10]
Win	4–10	Apr 2013	Barranquilla, Colombia	Challenger	Clay	(Argentina) Facundo Bagnis	(Brazil) Fabiano de Paula (Italy) Stefano Ianni	6–3, 7–5

== Performance timelines ==
Key
W	F	SF	QF	#R	RR	Q#	P#	DNQ	A	Z#	PO	G	S	B	NMS	NTI	P	NH

(W) winner; (F) finalist; (SF) semifinalist; (QF) quarterfinalist; (#R) rounds 4, 3, 2, 1; (RR) round-robin stage; (Q#) qualification round; (P#) preliminary round; (DNQ) did not qualify; (A) absent; (Z#) Davis/Fed Cup Zonal Group (with number indication) or (PO) play-off; (G) gold, (S) silver or (B) bronze Olympic/Paralympic medal; (NMS) not a Masters tournament; (NTI) not a Tier I tournament; (P) postponed; (NH) not held; (SR) strike rate (events won / competed); (W–L) win–loss record.
To avoid confusion and double counting, these charts are updated at the conclusion of a tournament or when the player's participation has ended.

=== Singles ===
Current through the 2022 Italian Masters.

Tournament	2009	2010	2011	2012	2013	2014	2015	2016	2017	2018	2019	2020	2021	2022	2023	SR	W–L	Win%
Grand Slam tournaments
Australian Open	A	Q1	A	A	A	1R	1R	3R	1R	1R	1R	2R	A	1R	Q1	0 / 8	3–8	27%
French Open	A	Q1	Q2	Q2	2R	1R	1R	1R	1R	2R	2R	1R	4R	2R	Q2	0 / 10	7–10	41%
Wimbledon	A	A	Q1	A	A	1R	1R	1R	A	1R	1R	NH	1R	1R	A	0 / 7	0–7	0%
US Open	A	A	Q1	Q1	Q1	2R	1R	2R	A	1R	1R	1R	1R	1R	Q1	0 / 8	2–8	20%
Win–loss	0–0	0–0	0–0	0–0	1–1	1–4	0–4	3–4	0–2	1–4	1–4	1–3	3–3	1–4	0–0	0 / 33	12–33	27%
ATP Masters 1000
Indian Wells Masters	A	A	A	A	A	1R	2R	4R	2R	2R	1R	NH	1R	2R		0 / 8	6–8	43%
Miami Masters	A	A	A	A	A	1R	2R	2R	4R	A	3R	NH	1R	1R		0 / 7	7–7	50%
Monte Carlo Masters	A	A	Q1	1R	A	1R	A	1R	A	Q1	1R	NH	2R	2R		0 / 5	2–6	25%
Madrid Masters	A	A	Q2	2R	A	1R	Q2	A	A	2R	A	NH	3R	3R		0 / 5	4–5	44%
Italian Masters	A	A	Q2	A	A	1R	Q2	A	A	1R	A	A	QF	1R		0 / 4	6–4	60%
Canadian Masters	A	A	A	A	A	1R	A	1R	A	A	A	NH	A			0 / 2	0–2	0%
Cincinnati Masters	A	A	A	A	A	1R	A	1R	A	A	2R	Q1	1R			0 / 4	0–4	0%
Shanghai Masters	A	A	A	A	Q2	Q1	A	1R	A	A	A	NH				0 / 1	0–1	0%
Paris Masters	A	A	A	A	A	A	Q1	A	A	A	Q1	1R	1R			0 / 2	0–2	0%
Win–loss	0–0	0–0	0–0	1–2	0–0	0–7	2–2	4–6	4–2	2–3	2–4	0–1	6–7	1–5		0 / 39	22–39	36%
National representation
Summer Olympics	NH			A	NH			1R	NH					NH		0 / 1	0–1	0%
Davis Cup	A	A	A	A	A	PO	SF	W	A	A	A	A	A			1 / 2	5–3	63%
Win–loss	0–0	0–0	0–0	0–0	0–0	0–0	2–2	3–2	0–0	0–0	0–0	0–0	0–0	0–0		1 / 3	5–3	56%
Career statistics
	2009	2010	2011	2012	2013	2014	2015	2016	2017	2018	2019	2020	2021	2022	2023	SR	W–L	Win %
Tournaments	1	2	2	9	8	28	18	24	10	18	20	12	24	22	1	199		
Titles / Finals	0 / 0	0 / 0	0 / 0	0 / 0	0 / 1	1 / 2	0 / 0	1 / 1	0 / 0	0 / 0	0 / 0	0 / 0	0 / 0	0 / 0		2 / 4		
Overall win–loss	0–1	0–2	3–2	6–9	12–8	20–27	17–20	27–24	11–10	11–18	14–20	9–12	23–24	10–22	1–1	2 / 199	164–200	45%
Win %	0%	0%	60%	40%	60%	43%	46%	53%	52%	38%	41%	43%	49%	31%	50%	45.05%		
Year-end ranking	195	160	166	133	55	60	52	41	68	80	76	82	44	125	276	$6,138,770		

=== Doubles ===
Tournament	2013	2014	2015	2016	2017	2018	2019	2020	2021	2022	W–L
Grand Slam tournaments
Australian Open	A	1R	1R	1R	1R	1R	A	2R	A	2R	2–7
French Open	A	1R	1R	2R	A	2R	3R	A	1R	1R	4–7
Wimbledon	A	1R	A	2R	A	2R	1R	NH	1R	1R	2–6
US Open	1R	1R	2R	1R	A	A	2R	A	1R	A	2–6
Win–loss	0–1	0–4	1–3	2–4	0–1	2–3	3–3	1–1	0–3	1–3	10–26

== Record against other players ==
=== Record against top 10 players ===
Delbonis's match record against those who have been ranked in the Top 10, with those who have been No. 1 in boldface, and retired players in italics.

- (Spain) Pablo Carreño Busta 5–4
- (Italy) Fabio Fognini 4–5
- (Russia) Karen Khachanov 2–0
- (Spain) Tommy Robredo 2–0
- (Argentina) Juan Mónaco 2–2
- (France) Gilles Simon 2–2
- (Argentina) Diego Schwartzman 2–5
- (Canada) Félix Auger-Aliassime 1–0
- (Russia) Nikolay Davydenko 1–0
- (Chile) Nicolás Massú 1–0
- (United States) Jack Sock 1–0
- (Argentina) Juan Martín del Potro 1–1
- (Switzerland) **Roger Federer** 1–1
- (Belgium) David Goffin 1–1
- (United States) John Isner 1–1
- (United Kingdom) **Andy Murray** 1–1
- (Serbia) Janko Tipsarević 1–1
- (Spain) Fernando Verdasco 1–1
- (Switzerland) Stan Wawrinka 1–1
- (Bulgaria) Grigor Dimitrov 1–2
- (Norway) Casper Ruud 1–2
- (Spain) Nicolás Almagro 1–3
- (Spain) David Ferrer 1–3
- (Spain) Carlos Alcaraz 0–1
- (Spain) Roberto Bautista Agut 0–1
- (Italy) Matteo Berrettini 0–1
- (Serbia) **Novak Djokovic** 0–1
- (Spain) **Juan Carlos Ferrero** 0–1
- (France) Richard Gasquet 0–1
- (Latvia) Ernests Gulbis 0–1
- (Russia) Daniil Medvedev 0–1
- (Italy) Jannik Sinner 0–1
- (Austria) Jürgen Melzer 0–1
- (Japan) Kei Nishikori 0–1
- (United Kingdom) Cameron Norrie 0–1
- (France) Lucas Pouille 0–1
- (Canada) Denis Shapovalov 0–1
- (France) Gaël Monfils 0–2
- (Russia) Andrey Rublev 0–2
- (Russia) Mikhail Youzhny 0–2
- (South Africa) Kevin Anderson 0–3
- (Croatia) Marin Čilić 0–3
- (Austria) Dominic Thiem 0–3
- (Germany) Alexander Zverev 0–3
- (Spain) **Rafael Nadal** 0–5

* Statistics correct as of 31 August 2022.

=== Wins over top 10 players per season ===
- He has a 3–19 record against players who were, at the time the match was played, ranked in the top 10.

Season	2013	2014	2015	2016	Total
Wins	1	0	1	1	**3**

#	Player	Rank	Event	Surface	Rd	Score
**2013**
1.	(Switzerland) Roger Federer	5	German Open, Germany	Clay	SF	7–6^{(9–7)}, 7–6^{(7–4)}
**2015**
2.	(Switzerland) Stan Wawrinka	9	Geneva Open, Switzerland	Clay	QF	6–7^{(5–7)}, 6–4, 6–4
**2016**
3.	(United Kingdom) Andy Murray	2	Indian Wells Masters, U.S.	Hard	3R	6–4, 4–6, 7–6^{(7–3)}

* Statistics correct as of 14 April 2022.
