= Julian Ocleppo =

Italian tennis player

- Country (sports): Italy
- Born: 1 August 1997 (age 29) Monte Carlo, Monaco
- Plays: Right-handed (two-handed backhand)
- Coach: Alessandro Motti
- Prize money: $155,072

Singles
- Career record: 0–0
- Career titles: 0
- Highest ranking: No. 309 (24 February 2020)

Doubles
- Career record: 0–1
- Career titles: 0
- Highest ranking: No. 167 (23 July 2018)

Julian Ocleppo (born 1 August 1997) is an Italian tennis player.

Ocleppo is the son of former tennis professional Gianni Ocleppo and his ex-wife Dee. He has a career high ATP singles ranking of No. 309 achieved on 24 February 2020 and a career high doubles ranking of No. 167 achieved on 23 July 2018.

Ocleppo has won four ATP Challenger doubles titles in Italy.

He made his main draw debut on the ATP World Tour at the 2018 Italian Open doubles competition partnering Andrea Vavassori.

== Challenger and Futures/World Tennis Tour finals ==
=== Singles: 7 (3–4) ===
Legend (singles) ATP Challenger Tour (0–0) ITF Futures/World Tennis Tour (3–4)	Titles by surface Hard (0–2) Clay (2–2) Grass (0–0) Carpet (1–0)

Result	W–L	Date	Tournament	Tier	Surface	Opponent	Score
Loss	0–1	Jul 2016	Portugal F10, Castelo Branco	Futures	Hard	(United Kingdom) Jonny O'Mara	6–3, 5–7, 6–7^{(2–7)}
Win	1–1	Oct 2018	Czech Republic F7, Liberec	Futures	Carpet (i)	(Czech Republic) Michael Vrbenský	4–6, 6–3, 6–4
Loss	1–2	Sep 2019	M25 Shrewsbury, Uk	World Tennis Tour	Hard (i)	(United Kingdom) Jack Draper	4–6, 0–6
Loss	1–3	Aug 2022	M15 Pescara, Italy	World Tennis Tour	Clay	(Italy) Marcello Serafini	3–6, 5–7
Win	2–3	Apr 2023	M25 Santa Margherita di Pula, Italy	World Tennis Tour	Clay	(Italy) Tommaso Compagnucci	6–0, 6–3
Loss	2–4	May 2023	M25 Reggio Emilia, Italy	World Tennis Tour	Clay	(United Kingdom) Jay Clarke	3–6, 4–6
Win	3–4	Jun 2023	M15 Frascati, Italy	World Tennis Tour	Clay	(Italy) Stefano Napolitano	6–4, 7–5

=== Doubles: 27 (16–11) ===
Legend (doubles) ATP Challenger Tour (4–3) ITF Futures Tour (12–8)	Titles by surface Hard (4–6) Clay (12–5) Grass (0–0) Carpet (0–0)

Result	W–L	Date	Tournament	Tier	Surface	Partner	Opponents	Score
Loss	0–1	Sep 2015	Italy F27, Santa Margherita di Pula	Futures	Clay	(Italy) Lorenzo Sonego	(Italy) Andrea Basso (Italy) Francesco Moncagatto	4–6, 7–6^{(10–8)}, [7–10]
Win	1–1	Oct 2015	Turkey F40, Antalya	Futures	Hard	(Italy) Enrico Dalla Valle	(Austria) Pascal Brunner (Austria) Lucas Miedler	6–3, 7–5
Loss	1–2	Nov 2015	Egypt F37, Sharm El Sheikh	Futures	Hard	(Italy) Enrico Dalla Valle	(United Kingdom) Luke Bambridge (United Kingdom) Richard Gabb	6–7^{(3–7)}, 4–6
Win	2–2	Aug 2016	Morocco F6, Tanger	Futures	Clay	(Portugal) Felipe Cunha Silva	(France) Gianni Mina (France) Alexandre Müller	6–3, 6–3
Loss	2–3	Dec 2016	Qatar F6, Doha	Futures	Hard	(Italy) Edoardo Eremin	(United Kingdom) Scott Clayton (United Kingdom) Jonny O'Mara	6–7^{(0–7)}, 4–6
Win	3–3	Jun 2017	Italy F16, Padova	Futures	Clay	(Italy) Andrea Vavassori	(Argentina) Franco Agamenone (Argentina) Facundo Mena	4–6, 6–1, [10–8]
Loss	3–4	Jul 2017	Recanati, Italy	Challenger	Clay	(Italy) Andrea Vavassori	(France) Jonathan Eysseric (France) Quentin Halys	7–6^{(7–3)}, 4–6, [10–12]
Win	4–4	Jul 2017	Egypt F20, Sharm El Sheikh	Futures	Hard	(Italy) Andrea Vavassori	(United States) Nathaniel Lammons (Portugal) Bernardo Saraiva	2–6, 6–3, [10–8]
Win	5–4	Jan 2018	Tunisia F1, Hammamet	Futures	Clay	(Italy) Marco Bortolotti	(Japan) Shunsuke Wakita (Serbia) Miljan Zekić	1–0 ret.
Win	6–4	Feb 2018	Egypt F4, Sharm El Sheikh	Futures	Hard	(Italy) Andrea Vavassori	(Czech Republic) Marek Gengel (Czech Republic) David Poljak	7–5, 6–4
Loss	6–5	Mar 2018	Greece F3, Heraklion	Futures	Hard	(Italy) Filippo Baldi	(Switzerland) Adrian Bodmer (Germany) Jakob Sude	4–6, 3–6
Win	7–5	Apr 2018	Francavilla, Italy	Challenger	Clay	(Italy) Andrea Vavassori	(Uruguay) Ariel Behar (Argentina) Máximo González	7–6^{(7–5)}, 7–6^{(7–3)}
Win	8–5	Jul 2018	Milan, Italy	Challenger	Clay	(Italy) Andrea Vavassori	(Ecuador) Gonzalo Escobar (Brazil) Fernando Romboli	4–6, 6–1, [11–9]
Win	9–5	Jul 2018	San Benedetto, Italy	Challenger	Clay	(Italy) Andrea Vavassori	(Peru) Sergio Galdós (Bolivia) Federico Zeballos	6–3, 6–2
Loss	9–6	Mar 2019	M15 Antalya, Turkey	World Tennis Tour	Clay	(Russia) Kirill Kivattsev	(Brazil) Felipe Meligeni Alves (Germany) Peter Torebko	4–6, 6–1, [8–10]
Loss	9–7	May 2019	Jerusalem, Israel	Challenger	Hard	(United States) Evan King	(Uruguay) Ariel Behar (Ecuador) Gonzalo Escobar	4–6, 6–7^{(5–7)}
Loss	9–8	Aug 2019	M25 Chiswick, Great Britain	World Tennis Tour	Hard	(Italy) Francesco Vilardo	(Republic of Ireland) Julian Bradley (United Kingdom) Ben Jones	6–2, 2–6, [5–10]
Loss	9–9	Oct 2019	M25 Santa Margherita di Pula, Italy	World Tennis Tour	Clay	(Italy) Giovanni Fonio	(Italy) Lorenzo Musetti (Italy) Giulio Zeppieri	3–6, 6–1, [8–10]
Win	10–9	Oct 2019	M25 Santa Margherita di Pula, Italy	World Tennis Tour	Clay	(Italy) Giovanni Fonio	(Bolivia) Boris Arias (Italy) Erik Crepaldi	6–3, 6–3
Win	11–9	Feb 2020	Bergamo, Italy	Challenger	Hard	(Czech Republic) Zdeněk Kolář	(Switzerland) Luca Margaroli (Italy) Andrea Vavassori	6–4, 6–3
Win	12–9	Jul 2021	M25 Casinalbo, Italy	World Tennis Tour	Clay	(Italy) Alessandro Motti	(Brazil) Matheus Pucinelli de Almeida (Brazil) Pedro Sakamoto	6–3, 6–2
Win	13–9	Jul 2022	M15 Bergamo, Italy	World Tennis Tour	Clay	(Italy) Enrico Dalla Valle	(Argentina) Juan Ignacio Galarza (Slovenia) Tomás Lipovšek Puches	6–3, 7–6^{(7–3)}
Win	14–9	Aug 2022	M25 Caslano, Switzerland	World Tennis Tour	Clay	(Italy) Enrico Dalla Valle	(Germany) Kai Wehnelt (Germany) Patrick Zahraj	6–7^{(12–14)}, 6–2, [10–6]
Loss	14–10	Nov 2022	Calgary, Canada	Challenger	Hard (i)	(Germany) Kai Wehnelt	(Austria) Maximilian Neuchrist (Greece) Michail Pervolarakis	4–6, 4–6
Win	15–10	Apr 2023	M25 Santa Margherita di Pula, Italy	World Tennis Tour	Clay	(Germany) Kai Wehnelt	(Italy) Patric Prinoth (Italy) Alexander Weis	7–5, 6–2
Win	16–10	May 2023	M25 Reggio Emilia, Italy	World Tennis Tour	Clay	(Italy) Francesco Forti	(Poland) Piotr Matuszewski (Germany) Kai Wehnelt	6–3, 6–7^{(2–7)}, [10–7]
Loss	16–11	Jun 2023	M25 Rome, Italy	World Tennis Tour	Clay	(Israel) Edan Leshem	(Denmark) August Holmgren (Austria) David Pichler	6–4, 7–5

== Personal life ==
He is the son of former tennis player Gianni Ocleppo and Dee Ocleppo Hilfiger. His mother is of Turkish and British descent..

He is the stepson of fashion mogul Tommy Hilfiger, through Dee's 2008 marriage.
