= Filippo Baldi =

Italian tennis player (born 1996)

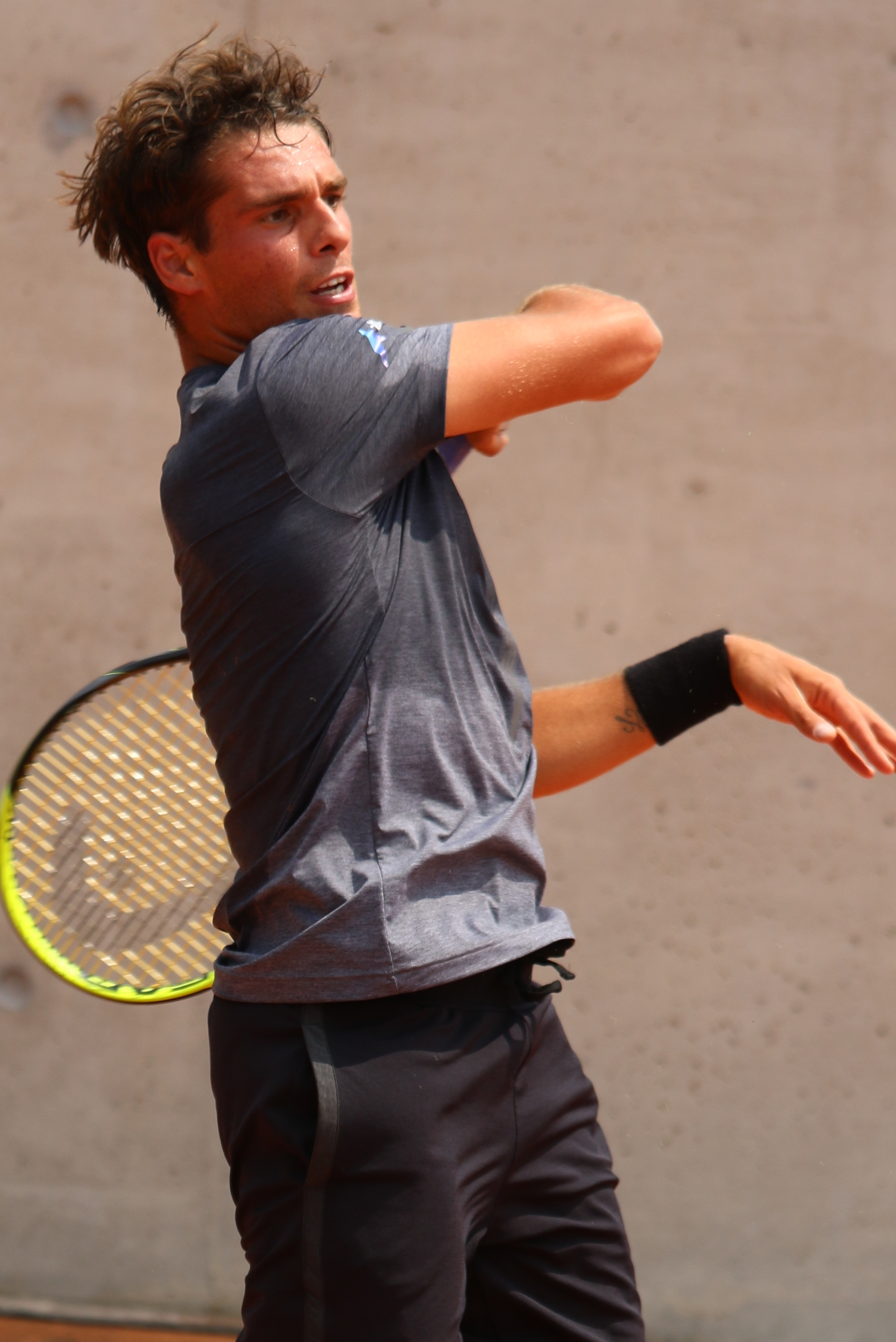
- Baldi at the 2019 French Open
- Full name: Filippo Baldi
- Country (sports): Italy
- Residence: Vigevano, Italy
- Born: January 10, 1996 (age 30) Milan, Italy
- Height: 1.83 m (6 ft 0 in)
- Retired: 19 January 2023 (last match in 2025)
- Plays: Right Handed (Double Handed Backhand)
- Prize money: US$ 320,761

Singles
- Career record: 0-3
- Career titles: 0
- Highest ranking: No. 144 (29 July 2019)

Grand Slam singles results
- Australian Open: Q2 (2019)
- French Open: Q1 (2019)
- Wimbledon: Q1 (2019, 2021)
- US Open: Q2 (2019)
- Australian Open Junior: SF (2013)
- French Open Junior: 2R (2013)
- Wimbledon Junior: QF (2014)

Doubles
- Career record: 0-1
- Career titles: 0
- Highest ranking: No. 226 (6 May 2019)
- Current ranking: No. 2,169 (20 April 2026)

Grand Slam doubles results
- Australian Open Junior: 2R (2013, 2014)
- French Open Junior: QF (2014)
- Wimbledon Junior: SF (2013)

Coaching career (2024–)
- Fabio Fognini (2024-2025)
- Last updated on: 30 April 2026.

Filippo Baldi (born 10 January 1996) is an Italian former tennis player and currently a tennis coach. Was a semifinalist at the 2013 Australian Open – Boys' singles and quarterfinalist at the 2014 Wimbledon Championships – Boys' singles. With Gianluigi Quinzi he won the 2012 Junior Davis Cup defeating the Australian team: it was the first time ever for an Italian team.

Baldi's first success came as a doubles player, winning 9 Futures titles, between 2014 and 2017. His first two singles titles on the Futures tour came in 2017 (both in Hammamet, Tunisia).

In 2018, Baldi made his first ATP main draw appearance as a qualifier at the Rome Masters, losing to Nikoloz Basilashvili. Paired with Andrea Pellegrino, he won the double title in the 2018 Internazionali di Tennis Città dell'Aquila. His first singles title on the ATP Challenger Tour was at the 2018 Wolffkran Open.

== Challenger and Futures finals ==
=== Singles: 6 (3–3) ===
Legend (singles) ATP Challenger Tour (1–2) ITF Futures Tour (2–1)	Titles by surface Hard (0–1) Clay (2–2) Grass (0–0) Carpet (1–0)

Result	W–L	Date	Tournament	Tier	Surface	Opponent	Score
Loss	0–1	Aug 2017	Finland F3, Helsinki	Futures	Clay	(Estonia) Jürgen Zopp	4–6, 0–6
Win	1–1	Sep 2017	Tunisia F27, Hammamet	Futures	Clay	(Portugal) Frederico Ferreira Silva	6–0, 6–4
Win	2–1	Oct 2017	Tunisia F29, Hammamet	Futures	Clay	(Tunisia) Aziz Dougaz	5–7, 6–4, 6–3
Win	3–1	Oct 2018	Ismaning, Germany	Challenger	Carpet (i)	(France) Gleb Sakharov	6–4, 6–4
Loss	3–2	Nov 2018	Andria, Italy	Challenger	Hard (i)	(France) Ugo Humbert	4–6, 6–7^{(3–7)}
Loss	3–3	Jun 2019	Vicenza, Italy	Challenger	Clay	(Italy) Alessandro Giannessi	5–7, 2–6

=== Doubles: 24 (11–13) ===
Legend (doubles) ATP Challenger Tour (1–3) ITF Futures Tour (10–10)	Titles by surface Hard (1–3) Clay (10–9) Grass (0–0) Carpet (0–1)

Result	W–L	Date	Tournament	Tier	Surface	Partner	Opponents	Score
Loss	0–1	Apr 2013	Italy F3, Vercelli	Futures	Clay	(Italy) Pietro Licciardi	(Argentina) Andrés Molteni (Finland) Timo Nieminen	0–6, 2–6
Win	1–1	Mar 2014	Italy F5, Santa Margherita di Pula	Futures	Clay	(Italy) Walter Trusendi	(Italy) Emanuele Molina (Italy) Riccardo Sinicropi	6–2, 6–7^{(2–7)}, [13–11]
Loss	1–2	Mar 2014	Italy F6, Santa Margherita di Pula	Futures	Clay	(Italy) Pietro Licciardi	(Spain) Roberto Carballés Baena (Spain) David Vega Hernández	4–6, 4–6
Win	2–2	Mar 2014	Italy F7, Santa Margherita di Pula	Futures	Clay	(Italy) Salvatore Caruso	(Italy) Francesco Borgo (Italy) Marco Speronello	6–3, 6–2
Loss	2–3	Oct 2014	Turkey F36, Antalya	Futures	Hard	(Italy) Pietro Licciardi	(France) Yannick Jankovits (France) Nicolas Rosenzweig	4–6, 6–3, [14–16]
Win	3–3	Mar 2015	Turkey F12, Antalya	Futures	Hard	(Italy) Matteo Berrettini	(Italy) Edoardo Eremin (Italy) Lorenzo Sonego	6–7^{(3–7)}, 6–2, [10–0]
Loss	3–4	May 2015	Italy F9, Santa Margherita di Pula	Futures	Clay	(Italy) Matteo Berrettini	(Italy) Pietro Licciardi (Italy) Pietro Rondoni	6–3, 4–6, [7–10]
Loss	3–5	Jun 2015	Italy F14, Napoli	Futures	Clay	(Spain) Eduard Esteve Lobato	(Spain) Gerard Granollers Pujol (Netherlands) Mark Vervoort	4–6, 5–7
Win	4–5	Sep 2015	Italy F26, Santa Margherita di Pula	Futures	Clay	(Italy) Lorenzo Sonego	(Germany) Florian Fallert (Germany) Demian Raab	1–6, 6–4, [10–5]
Loss	4–6	Oct 2015	Italy F30, Santa Margherita di Pula	Futures	Clay	(Italy) Gianluca Naso	(Italy) Matteo Berrettini (Italy) Andrea Pellegrino	w/o
Loss	4–7	Jan 2016	Azerbaijan F1, Baku	Futures	Carpet (i)	(Italy) Pietro Licciardi	(Russia) Alexander Igoshin (Russia) Yan Sabanin	6–7^{(7–9)}, 4–6
Loss	4–8	Jun 2016	Italy F15, Sassuolo	Futures	Clay	(Italy) Pietro Licciardi	(Sweden) Markus Eriksson (Sweden) Milos Sekulic	4–6, 3–6
Win	5–8	Jul 2016	Italy F19, Napoli	Futures	Clay	(Italy) Andrea Pellegrino	(Brazil) Eduardo Dischinger (Argentina) Juan Pablo Paz	5–7, 7–5, [10–2]
Loss	5–9	Nov 2016	Italy F36, Santa Margherita di Pula	Futures	Clay	(Italy) Jacopo Stefanini	(Italy) Andrea Basso (Italy) Francesco Moncagatto	6–4, 4–6, [6–10]
Win	6–9	Nov 2016	Italy F37, Latina	Futures	Clay	(Italy) Giuseppe Fischetti	(Italy) Francesco Moncagatto (Italy) Jacopo Stefanini	6–1, 6–7^{(2–7)}, [10–5]
Win	7–9	Dec 2016	Tunisia F35, Hammamet	Futures	Clay	(Italy) Alessandro Petrone	(Ukraine) Filipp Kekercheni (Portugal) Gonçalo Oliveira	1–6, 6–3, [11–9]
Loss	7–10	Jul 2017	Milan, Italy	Challenger	Clay	(Italy) Omar Giacalone	(Poland) Tomasz Bednarek (Netherlands) David Pel	1–6, 1–6
Win	8–10	Aug 2017	Finland F3, Helsinki	Futures	Clay	(Italy) Marco Bortolotti	(Netherlands) Marc Dijkhuizen (Netherlands) Bart Stevens	6–4, 7–6^{(7–5)}
Win	9–10	Sep 2017	Tunisia F26, Hammamet	Futures	Clay	(Italy) Mirko Cutuli	(France) Elliot Benchetrit (Germany) Louis Wessels	6–4, 6–4
Loss	9–11	Oct 2017	Italy F34, Santa Margherita di Pula	Futures	Clay	(Italy) Andrea Pellegrino	(Spain) Marc Fornell Mestres (Portugal) Fred Gil	2–6, 7–5, [5–10]
Loss	9–12	Mar 2018	Greece F3, Heraklion	Futures	Hard	(Italy) Julian Ocleppo	(Switzerland) Adrian Bodmer (Germany) Jakob Sude	4–6, 3–6
Win	10–12	Jun 2018	L'Aquila, Italy	Challenger	Clay	(Italy) Andrea Pellegrino	(Spain) Pedro Martínez (Netherlands) Mark Vervoort	4–6, 6–3, [10–5]
Loss	11–12	Oct 2018	Florence, Italy	Challenger	Clay	(Italy) Salvatore Caruso	(Australia) Rameez Junaid (Netherlands) David Pel	5–7, 6–3, [7–10]
Loss	11–13	Feb 2019	Budapest, Hungary	Challenger	Hard (i)	(Switzerland) Luca Margaroli	(Germany) Kevin Krawietz (Slovakia) Filip Polášek	5–7, 6–7^{(5–7)}
