= Aspria Tennis Cup =

- 2025 Aspria Tennis Cup

ATP Challenger Tour
- Event name: Aspria Tennis Cup
- Location: Milan, Italy
- Venue: Harbour Club Milano
- Category: ATP Challenger Tour
- Surface: Clay
- Draw: 32S/28Q/16D
- Prize money: €91,250 (2025), 42,500
- Website: website

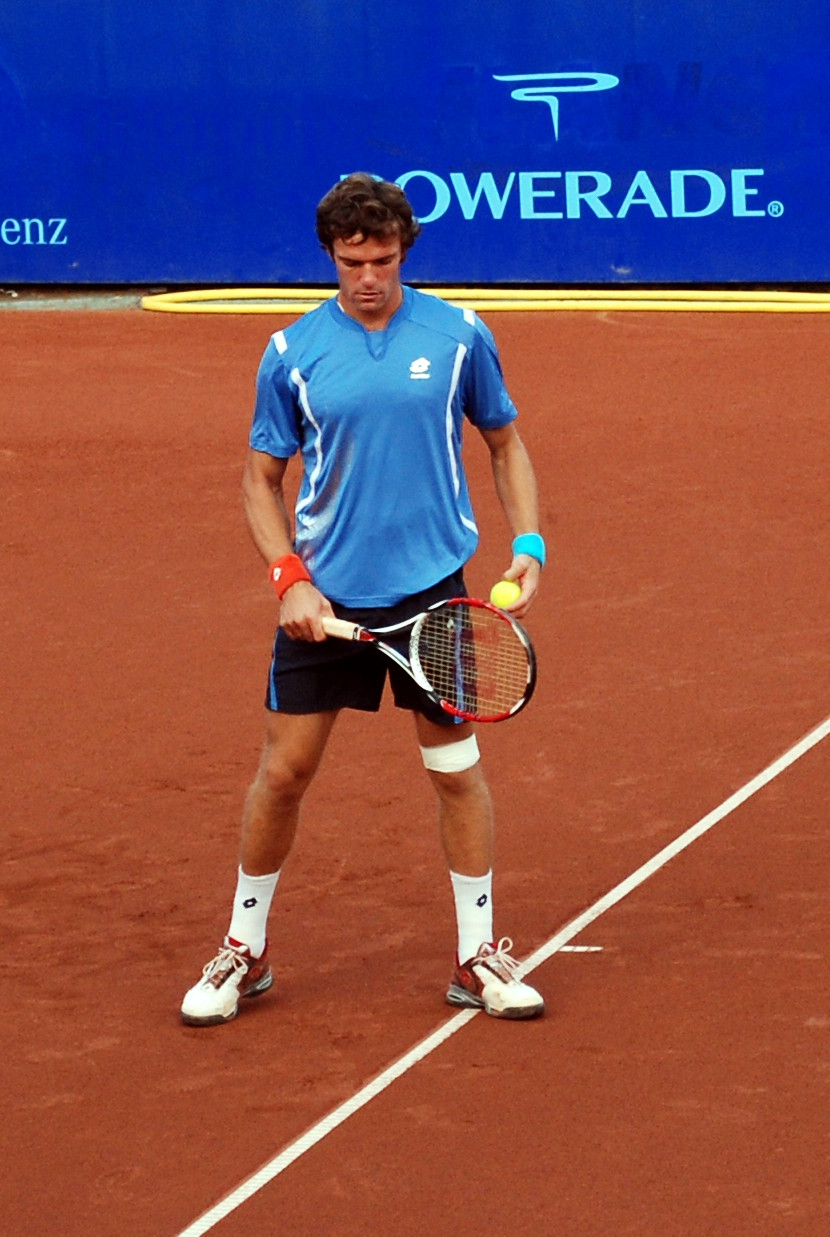
Russian Teymuraz Gabashvili defeated Diego Hartfield in the singles final in 2008

The Aspria Tennis Cup (formerly Zenith Tennis Cup) is a professional tennis tournament played on outdoor red clay courts. It is currently part of the Association of Tennis Professionals (ATP) Challenger Tour. It is held annually at the Harbour Club Milano in Milan, Italy, since 2006.

== Past finals ==
=== Singles ===
Year	Champion	Runner-up	Score
2026	(Argentina) Facundo Díaz Acosta	(Italy) Marco Cecchinato	6–7^{(0–7)}, 7–6^{(7–5)}, 7–6^{(7–5)}
2025	(Italy) Marco Cecchinato	(Croatia) Dino Prižmić	6–2, 6–3
2024	(Argentina) Federico Agustín Gómez	(Romania) Filip Cristian Jianu	6–3, 6–4
2023	(Argentina) Facundo Díaz Acosta	(Italy) Matteo Gigante	6–3, 6–3
2022	(Argentina) Federico Coria	(Italy) Francesco Passaro	7–6^{(7–2)}, 6–4
2021	(Italy) Gian Marco Moroni	(Argentina) Federico Coria	6–3, 6–2
2020	Not held		
2019	(Bolivia) Hugo Dellien	(Serbia) Danilo Petrović	7–5, 6–4
2018	(Serbia) Laslo Djere	(Italy) Gianluca Mager	6–2, 6–1
2017	(Argentina) Guido Pella	(Argentina) Federico Delbonis	6–2, 2–1 ret.
2016	(Italy) Marco Cecchinato	(Serbia) Laslo Djere	6–2, 6–2
2015	(Argentina) Federico Delbonis	(Brazil) Rogério Dutra Silva	6–1, 7–6(6)
2014	(Spain) Albert Ramos	(Spain) Pere Riba	6–3, 7–5
2013	(Italy) Filippo Volandri	(Slovakia) Andrej Martin	6–3, 6–2
2012	(Spain) Tommy Robredo	(Argentina) Martín Alund	6–3, 6–0
2011	(Spain) Albert Ramos	(Kazakhstan) Evgeny Korolev	6–4, 3–0, ret.
2010	(Portugal) Frederico Gil	(Argentina) Máximo González	6–1, 7–5
2009	(Italy) Alessio di Mauro	(France) Vincent Millot	6–4, 7–6(3)
2008	(Russia) Teymuraz Gabashvili	(Argentina) Diego Hartfield	6–4, 4–6, 6–4
2007	(Spain) Santiago Ventura	(Romania) Victor Hănescu	6–3, 7–5
2006	(United States) Wayne Odesnik	(France) Arnaud Di Pasquale	5–7, 6–2, 7–6(5)

=== Doubles ===
Year	Champions	Runners-up	Score
2026	(Italy) Francesco Forti (Italy) Filippo Romano	(India) Siddhant Banthia (India) Arjun Kadhe	6–3, 7–6^{(7–5)}
2025	(Australia) Matthew Romios (United States) Ryan Seggerman	(United States) George Goldhoff (Chinese Taipei) Ray Ho	3–6, 7–5, [10–8]
2024	(Germany) Andre Begemann (France) Jonathan Eysseric	(Czech Republic) Petr Nouza (Czech Republic) Patrik Rikl	2–6, 6–4, [10–6]
2023	(France) Jonathan Eysseric (Ukraine) Denys Molchanov	(France) Théo Arribagé (France) Luca Sanchez	6–2, 6–4
2022	(Italy) Luciano Darderi (Brazil) Fernando Romboli	(Ecuador) Diego Hidalgo (Colombia) Cristian Rodríguez	6–4, 2–6, [10–5]
2021	(Czech Republic) Vít Kopřiva (Czech Republic) Jiří Lehečka	(Germany) Dustin Brown (Austria) Tristan-Samuel Weissborn	6–4, 6–0
2020	Not held		
2019	(Bosnia and Herzegovina) Tomislav Brkić (Croatia) Ante Pavić	(Belarus) Andrei Vasilevski (Italy) Andrea Vavassori	7–6^{(8–6)}, 6–2
2018	(Italy) Julian Ocleppo (Italy) Andrea Vavassori	(Ecuador) Gonzalo Escobar (Brazil) Fernando Romboli	4–6, 6–1, [11–9]
2017	(Poland) Tomasz Bednarek (Netherlands) David Pel	(Italy) Filippo Baldi (Italy) Omar Giacalone	6–1, 6–1
2016	(Mexico) Miguel Ángel Reyes-Varela (United States) Max Schnur	(Italy) Alessandro Motti (Chinese Taipei) Peng Hsien-yin	1–6, 7–6^{(7–4)}, [10–5]
2015	(Croatia) Nikola Mektić (Croatia) Antonio Šančić	(Chile) Christian Garin (Chile) Juan Carlos Sáez	6-3, 6-4
2014	(Argentina) Guillermo Durán (Argentina) Máximo González	(United States) James Cerretani (Germany) Frank Moser	6–3, 6–3
2013	(Italy) Marco Crugnola (Italy) Daniele Giorgini	(Australia) Alex Bolt (Chinese Taipei) Peng Hsien-yin	4–6, 7–5, [10–8]
2012	(United States) Nicholas Monroe (Germany) Simon Stadler	(Kazakhstan) Andrey Golubev (Kazakhstan) Yuri Schukin	6–4, 3–6, [11–9]
2011	(Spain) Adrián Menéndez (Italy) Simone Vagnozzi	(Italy) Andrea Arnaboldi (Portugal) Leonardo Tavares	0–6, 6–3, [10–5]
2010	(Italy) Daniele Bracciali (Spain) Rubén Ramírez Hidalgo	(United States) James Cerretani (South Africa) Jeff Coetzee	6–4, 7–5
2009	(Switzerland) Yves Allegro (Italy) Daniele Bracciali	(Italy) Manuel Jorquera (Italy) Francesco Piccari	6–4, 6–2
2008	(Switzerland) Yves Allegro (Romania) Horia Tecău	(Argentina) Juan-Martín Aranguren (Spain) Marc Fornell-Mestres	6–4, 6–4
2007	(Italy) Fabio Colangelo (Uruguay) Martín Vilarrubí	(Italy) Alessandro da Col (Italy) Manuel Jorquera	6–7(2), 7–6(8), 10–8
2006	(Italy) Giorgio Galimberti (Israel) Harel Levy	(Portugal) Frederico Gil (Spain) Juan Albert Viloca	6–3, 6–3
