= 2024 Internazionali di Tennis Città di Vicenza – Doubles =

Doubles
- 2024 Internazionali di Tennis Città di Vicenza

Final
- Champions: (Ukraine) Vladyslav Manafov (Finland) Patrik Niklas-Salminen
- Runners-up: (Germany) Andre Begemann (India) Niki Kaliyanda Poonacha
- Score: 6–3, 6–4

Events
Singles	Doubles
← 2023 ·	Internazionali di Tennis Città di Vicenza	· 2025 →

Anirudh Chandrasekar and Vijay Sundar Prashanth were the defending champions but chose to defend their title with different partners. Chandrasekar partnered Arjun Kadhe but lost in the first round to Marco Bortolotti and Alexandru Jecan. Prashanth partnered Jeevan Nedunchezhiyan but lost in the quarterfinals to Vladyslav Manafov and Patrik Niklas-Salminen.

Manafov and Niklas-Salminen won the title after defeating Andre Begemann and Niki Kaliyanda Poonacha 6–3, 6–4 in the final.

== Seeds ==
1. (Bolivia) Boris Arias / (Bolivia) Federico Zeballos (first round)
2. (India) Anirudh Chandrasekar / (India) Arjun Kadhe (first round)
3. (India) Jeevan Nedunchezhiyan / (India) Vijay Sundar Prashanth (quarterfinals)
4. (Germany) Andre Begemann / (India) Niki Kaliyanda Poonacha (final)

== Draw ==
=== Key ===
- Q = Qualifier
- WC = Wild card
- LL = Lucky loser
- Alt = Alternate
- SE = Special exempt
- PR = Protected ranking
- ITF = ITF entry
- JE = Junior exempt
- w/o = Walkover
- r = Retired
- d = Defaulted
- SR = Special ranking

=== Draw ===
First round
1	(Bolivia) B Arias (Bolivia) F Zeballos	3	6	[10]
(Germany) J Schnaitter (Germany) M Wallner	6	3	[12]
(France) C Bittoun Kouzmine (Bulgaria) A Donski	4	6^{1}
(Chinese Taipei) R Ho (Australia) C Puttergill	6	7^{7}
3	(India) J Nedunchezhiyan (India) VS Prashanth	6	2	0
(Spain) D Vega Hernández (Poland) S Walków	4	6	0^{r}
(Ukraine) V Manafov (Finland) P Niklas-Salminen	4	7	[10]
Alt	(Turkey) E Kırkın (Kazakhstan) D Popko	6	5	[7]
WC	(Italy) Jacopo Bilardo (Italy) G Ricca	3	5
(Poland) K Drzewiecki (Switzerland) L Margaroli	6	7
(United States) R Seggerman (United States) P Trhac	3	7^{7}	[8]
4	(Germany) A Begemann (India) N Kaliyanda Poonacha	6	6^{4}	[10]
(United States) G Goldhoff (Denmark) J Ingildsen	7	3	[13]
WC	(Italy) Luca Giacomini (Italy) G Oradini	5	6	[15]
(Italy) M Bortolotti (Romania) A Jecan	6	6^{7}	[11]
2	(India) A Chandrasekar (India) A Kadhe	2	7^{9}	[9]

Quarterfinals
(Germany) J Schnaitter (Germany) M Wallner	6	6
(Chinese Taipei) R Ho (Australia) C Puttergill	3	1
3	(India) J Nedunchezhiyan (India) VS Prashanth	3	4
(Ukraine) V Manafov (Finland) P Niklas-Salminen	6	6
(Poland) K Drzewiecki (Switzerland) L Margaroli	2	1^{r}
4	(Germany) A Begemann (India) N Kaliyanda Poonacha	6	3
WC	(Italy) L Giacomini (Italy) G Oradini	3	6	[10]
(Italy) M Bortolotti (Romania) A Jecan	6	3	[8]

Semifinals
(Germany) J Schnaitter (Germany) M Wallner	2	5
(Ukraine) V Manafov (Finland) P Niklas-Salminen	6	7
4	(Germany) A Begemann (India) N Kaliyanda Poonacha	6	4	[10]
WC	(Italy) L Giacomini (Italy) G Oradini	4	6	[6]

Final
(Ukraine) V Manafov (Finland) P Niklas-Salminen	6	6
4	(Germany) A Begemann (India) N Kaliyanda Poonacha	3	4
