= 2022 Internazionali di Tennis Città di Vicenza – Singles =

Singles
- 2022 Internazionali di Tennis Città di Vicenza

Final
- Champion: (Italy) Andrea Pellegrino
- Runner-up: (Argentina) Andrea Collarini
- Score: 6–1, 6–4

Events
Singles	Doubles
← 2019 ·	Internazionali di Tennis Città di Vicenza	· 2023 →

Alessandro Giannessi was the defending champion but chose not to defend his title.

Andrea Pellegrino won the title after defeating Andrea Collarini 6–1, 6–4 in the final.

== Seeds ==
1. (Italy) Gianluca Mager (quarterfinals)
2. (Argentina) Juan Manuel Cerúndolo (quarterfinals)
3. (Italy) Andreas Seppi (first round)
4. (Italy) Flavio Cobolli (second round)
5. (Argentina) Renzo Olivo (second round)
6. (Kazakhstan) Dmitry Popko (first round)
7. (Italy) Lorenzo Giustino (first round)
8. (Italy) Salvatore Caruso (first round)

== Draw ==
=== Key ===
- Q = Qualifier
- WC = Wild card
- LL = Lucky loser
- Alt = Alternate
- SE = Special exempt
- PR = Protected ranking
- ITF = ITF entry
- JE = Junior exempt
- w/o = Walkover
- r = Retired
- d = Defaulted
- SR = Special ranking

=== Finals ===
Semifinals
Alt	(Italy) Andrea Pellegrino	4	6	6
WC	(Italy) Matteo Gigante	6	3	3
Alt	(Brazil) Daniel Dutra da Silva	2	1
(Argentina) Andrea Collarini	6	6

Final
Alt	(Italy) Andrea Pellegrino	6	6
(Argentina) Andrea Collarini	1	4

=== Top half ===
First round
1	(Italy) G Mager	6	7^{7}
LL	Yan Bondarevskiy	3	6^{3}
(Italy) R Bonadio	2	6	6
Alt	(France) M Janvier	6	3	3
Q	(Italy) G Fonio	6	6
(Argentina) GA Olivieri	3	4
Alt	(Italy) A Pellegrino	6	6
7	(Italy) L Giustino	4	4
3	(Italy) A Seppi	1	6^{5}
(Italy) A Arnaboldi	6	7^{7}
SE	(Italy) F Maestrelli	6	6
Q	(France) K de Schepper	4	2
Alt	(Canada) A Galarneau	4	6	3
WC	(Italy) M Gigante	6	2	6
(Ukraine) V Sachko	3	6^{2}
5	(Argentina) R Olivo	6	7^{7}

Second round
1	(Italy) G Mager	7	6
(Italy) R Bonadio	5	2
Q	(Italy) G Fonio	6^{8}	3
Alt	(Italy) A Pellegrino	7^{10}	6
(Italy) A Arnaboldi	6	6
SE	(Italy) F Maestrelli	3	2
WC	(Italy) M Gigante	6	7^{7}
5	(Argentina) R Olivo	3	6^{5}

Quarterfinals
1	(Italy) G Mager	4	6	2
Alt	(Italy) A Pellegrino	6	4	6
(Italy) A Arnaboldi	4	5
WC	(Italy) M Gigante	6	7

Semifinals
Alt	(Italy) A Pellegrino	4	6	6
WC	(Italy) M Gigante	6	3	3

=== Bottom half ===
First round
8/WC	(Italy) S Caruso	6	5	4
Q	(Ukraine) O Prihodko	4	7	6
Q	(Colombia) N Barrientos	0	4
Alt	(Brazil) D Dutra da Silva	6	6
SE	(Italy) M Arnaldi	5	6	6
(United States) N Moreno de Alboran	7	3	1
WC	(Italy) F Passaro	6	4	4
4	(Italy) F Cobolli	2	6	6
6	(Kazakhstan) D Popko	6	1	2
Q	(Argentina) F Comesaña	2	6	6
(Czech Republic) L Rosol	0	3
(Argentina) A Collarini	6	6
Alt	(Italy) L Darderi	6	3	6
Alt	(Bosnia and Herzegovina) N Fatić	3	6	4
(France) A Müller	5	4
2	(Argentina) JM Cerúndolo	7	6

Second round
Q	(Ukraine) O Prihodko	2	6	2
Alt	(Brazil) D Dutra da Silva	6	2	6
SE	(Italy) M Arnaldi	6	4	6
4	(Italy) F Cobolli	4	6	4
Q	(Argentina) F Comesaña	2	2
(Argentina) A Collarini	6	6
Alt	(Italy) L Darderi	4	1
2	(Argentina) JM Cerúndolo	6	6

Quarterfinals
Alt	(Brazil) D Dutra da Silva	5	7	7^{7}
SE	(Italy) M Arnaldi	7	5	6^{4}
(Argentina) A Collarini	6	6
2	(Argentina) JM Cerúndolo	2	3

Semifinals
Alt	(Brazil) D Dutra da Silva	2	1
(Argentina) A Collarini	6	6
