= 2018 Internazionali di Tennis Città di Vicenza – Doubles =

Doubles
- 2018 Internazionali di Tennis Città di Vicenza

Final
- Champions: (Uruguay) Ariel Behar (Spain) Enrique López Pérez
- Runners-up: (Argentina) Facundo Bagnis (Brazil) Fabrício Neis
- Score: 6–2, 6–4

Events
Singles	Doubles
← 2017 ·	Internazionali di Tennis Città di Vicenza	· 2019 →

Gero Kretschmer and Alexander Satschko were the defending champions but chose not to defend their title.

Ariel Behar and Enrique López Pérez won the title after defeating Facundo Bagnis and Fabrício Neis 6–2, 6–4 in the final.

== Seeds ==
1. (Poland) Tomasz Bednarek / (Slovakia) Igor Zelenay (first round)
2. (South Africa) Ruan Roelofse / (Austria) Tristan-Samuel Weissborn (semifinals)
3. (Uruguay) Ariel Behar / (Spain) Enrique López Pérez (champions)
4. (Croatia) Marin Draganja / (Croatia) Tomislav Draganja (first round)

== Draw ==
=== Key ===
- Q = Qualifier
- WC = Wild card
- LL = Lucky loser
- Alt = Alternate
- SE = Special exempt
- PR = Protected ranking
- ITF = ITF entry
- JE = Junior exempt
- w/o = Walkover
- r = Retired
- d = Defaulted
- SR = Special ranking

First round
1	(Poland) T Bednarek (Slovakia) I Zelenay	1	5
(Bolivia) H Dellien (Ecuador) R Quiroz	6	7
(Dominican Republic) V Estrella Burgos (Italy) S Travaglia	2	2
WC	(Italy) F Gaio (Italy) A Pellegrino	6	6
3	(Uruguay) A Behar (Spain) E López Pérez	6	6
WC	(Italy) Francesco Ferrari (Italy) Luca Giacomini	3	3
(Peru) S Galdós (Argentina) R Olivo	6	6
Alt	(United States) S Kozlov (United States) M Krueger	2	4
(Switzerland) L Margaroli (Brazil) F Romboli	4	6	[10]
(United States) E King (United States) N Pasha	6	4	[5]
(Argentina) F Bagnis (Brazil) F Neis	6	3	[12]
4	(Croatia) M Draganja (Croatia) T Draganja	2	6	[10]
(Japan) T Matsui (Sweden) A Siljeström	6	7^{7}
(Australia) J Kubler (Australia) A Santillan	1	6^{5}
WC	(Italy) Nicola Ghedin (Italy) Edoardo Sardella	2	2
2	(South Africa) R Roelofse (Austria) T-S Weissborn	6	6

Quarterfinals
(Bolivia) H Dellien (Ecuador) R Quiroz	6	3	[7]
WC	(Italy) F Gaio (Italy) A Pellegrino	0	6	[10]
3	(Uruguay) A Behar (Spain) E López Pérez	w/o
(Peru) S Galdós (Argentina) R Olivo
(Switzerland) L Margaroli (Brazil) F Romboli	1	1
(Argentina) F Bagnis (Brazil) F Neis	6	6
(Japan) T Matsui (Sweden) A Siljeström	6	3	[12]
2	(South Africa) R Roelofse (Austria) T-S Weissborn	3	6	[14]

Semifinals
WC	(Italy) F Gaio (Italy) A Pellegrino	2	2
3	(Uruguay) A Behar (Spain) E López Pérez	6	6
(Argentina) F Bagnis (Brazil) F Neis	6	7^{7}
2	(South Africa) R Roelofse (Austria) T-S Weissborn	3	6^{3}

Final
3	(Uruguay) A Behar (Spain) E López Pérez	6	6
(Argentina) F Bagnis (Brazil) F Neis	2	4
