= 2015 Internazionali di Tennis Città di Vicenza – Doubles =

Doubles
- 2015 Internazionali di Tennis Città di Vicenza

Final
- Champions: (Argentina) Facundo Bagnis (Argentina) Guido Pella
- Runners-up: (Italy) Salvatore Caruso (Italy) Federico Gaio
- Score: 6–2, 6–4

Events
Singles	Doubles
← 2014 ·	Internazionali di Tennis Città di Vicenza	· 2016 →

Andrej Martin and Igor Zelenay are the defending champions, but Martin did not return to defend his title. Zelenay plays alongside Mateusz Kowalczyk, they lost already in the first round to Guido Andreozzi and Nicolás Jarry.

Facundo Bagnis and Guido Pella won the tournament, defeating Italians Salvatore Caruso and Federico Gaio in the final.

== Seeds ==
1. (Argentina) Guillermo Durán / (Venezuela) Roberto Maytín (first round)
2. (Germany) Martin Emmrich / (Sweden) Andreas Siljeström (first round)
3. (Poland) Mateusz Kowalczyk / (Slovakia) Igor Zelenay (first round)
4. (Argentina) Facundo Bagnis / (Argentina) Guido Pella (champions)

== Draw ==
=== Key ===
- Q = Qualifier
- WC = Wild card
- LL = Lucky loser
- Alt = Alternate
- SE = Special exempt
- PR = Protected ranking
- ITF = ITF entry
- JE = Junior exempt
- w/o = Walkover
- r = Retired
- d = Defaulted
- SR = Special ranking

=== Draw ===
First round
1	(Argentina) G Durán (Venezuela) R Maytín	6	5	[11]
(United States) C Buchanan (United States) B Fratangelo	3	7	[13]
WC	(Italy) M Donati (Italy) S Napolitano	6	6
(Spain) I Cervantes (Spain) P Riba	3	4
4	(Argentina) F Bagnis (Argentina) G Pella	6	6
WC	(Italy) Nicola Ghedin (Italy) M Viola	1	4
(Peru) S Galdós (Argentina) R Olivo	4	6	[12]
(Serbia) I Bozoljac (Canada) F Dancevic	6	2	[10]
WC	(Italy) S Caruso (Italy) F Gaio	6	6
(United Kingdom) S Thornley (United Kingdom) D Walsh	2	0
(Argentina) G Andreozzi (Chile) N Jarry	6	6
3	(Poland) M Kowalczyk (Slovakia) I Zelenay	4	3
(Brazil) G Clezar (Mexico) C Ramírez	2	7	[10]
(United States) J Cerretani (United States) M Krueger	6	5	[6]
(Chinese Taipei) H-h Lee (Italy) A Motti	6	0	[10]
2	(Germany) M Emmrich (Sweden) A Siljeström	3	6	[3]

Quarterfinals
(United States) C Buchanan (United States) B Fratangelo	3	4
WC	(Italy) M Donati (Italy) S Napolitano	6	6
4	(Argentina) F Bagnis (Argentina) G Pella	6	6
(Peru) S Galdós (Argentina) R Olivo	3	2
WC	(Italy) S Caruso (Italy) F Gaio	6	6
(Argentina) G Andreozzi (Chile) N Jarry	3	4
(Brazil) G Clezar (Mexico) C Ramírez	6	6^{3}	[8]
(Chinese Taipei) H-h Lee (Italy) A Motti	4	7^{7}	[10]

Semifinals
WC	(Italy) M Donati (Italy) S Napolitano	3	4
4	(Argentina) F Bagnis (Argentina) G Pella	6	6
WC	(Italy) S Caruso (Italy) F Gaio	3	6	[10]
(Chinese Taipei) H-h Lee (Italy) A Motti	6	4	[5]

Final
4	(Argentina) F Bagnis (Argentina) G Pella	6	6
WC	(Italy) S Caruso (Italy) F Gaio	2	4
