= 2018 Internazionali di Tennis Città di Vicenza =

- Date: 28 May – 3 June
- Edition: 5th
- Draw: 32S / 16D
- Surface: Clay
- Location: Vicenza, Italy

Champions

Singles
- (Bolivia) Hugo Dellien

Doubles
- (Uruguay) Ariel Behar / (Spain) Enrique López Pérez
| ← 2017 · | Internazionali di Tennis Città di Vicenza | · 2019 → |

The 2018 Internazionali di Tennis Città di Vicenza was a professional tennis tournament played on clay courts. It was the fifth edition of the tournament which was part of the 2018 ATP Challenger Tour. It took place in Vicenza, Italy between 28 May and 3 June 2018.

== Singles main-draw entrants ==
=== Seeds ===
| Country | Player | Rank^{1} | Seed |
|---|---|---|---|
| ITA | Lorenzo Sonego | 126 | 1 |
| GER | Yannick Maden | 128 | 2 |
| AUT | Sebastian Ofner | 131 | 3 |
| BOL | Hugo Dellien | 139 | 4 |
| ITA | Stefano Travaglia | 145 | 5 |
| GER | Matthias Bachinger | 154 | 6 |
| AUS | Jason Kubler | 160 | 7 |
| DOM | Víctor Estrella Burgos | 165 | 8 |

- ^{1} Rankings are as of 21 May 2018.

=== Other entrants ===
The following players received wildcards into the singles main draw:

- (Italy) Liam Caruana
- (Italy) Matteo Donati
- (Italy) Gian Marco Moroni
- (Italy) Stefano Travaglia

The following players received entry into the singles main draw as special exempts:

- (Serbia) Danilo Petrović
- (Italy) Gianluigi Quinzi

The following players received entry from the qualifying draw:

- (Uruguay) Martín Cuevas
- (Italy) Gianluca Mager
- (Australia) Marc Polmans
- (Ecuador) Roberto Quiroz

The following player received entry as a lucky loser:

- (Brazil) Guilherme Clezar

== Champions ==
=== Singles ===
- (Bolivia) Hugo Dellien def. (Italy) Matteo Donati 6–4, 5–7, 6–4.

=== Doubles ===
- (Uruguay) Ariel Behar / (Spain) Enrique López Pérez def. (Argentina) Facundo Bagnis / (Brazil) Fabrício Neis 6–2, 6–4.
