= 2017 Internazionali di Tennis Città di Vicenza – Singles =

Singles
- 2017 Internazionali di Tennis Città di Vicenza

Final
- Champion: (Hungary) Márton Fucsovics
- Runner-up: (Serbia) Laslo Đere
- Score: 4–6, 7–6^{(9–7)}, 6–2

Events
Singles	Doubles
← 2016 ·	Internazionali di Tennis Città di Vicenza	· 2018 →

Guido Andreozzi was the defending champion but lost in the first round to Lorenzo Giustino.

Márton Fucsovics won the title after defeating Laslo Đere 4–6, 7–6^{(9–7)}, 6–2 in the final.

== Seeds ==
1. (Slovakia) Andrej Martin (first round)
2. (Italy) Alessandro Giannessi (first round)
3. (Austria) Gerald Melzer (first round)
4. (Argentina) Guido Andreozzi (first round)
5. (Germany) Maximilian Marterer (second round)
6. (Spain) Roberto Carballés Baena (first round)
7. (Serbia) Laslo Đere (final)
8. (Brazil) João Souza (first round)

== Draw ==
=== Key ===
- Q = Qualifier
- WC = Wild card
- LL = Lucky loser
- Alt = Alternate
- SE = Special exempt
- PR = Protected ranking
- ITF = ITF entry
- JE = Junior exempt
- w/o = Walkover
- r = Retired
- d = Defaulted
- SR = Special ranking

=== Finals ===
Semifinals
(Czech Republic) Jan Šátral	7^{7}	6^{2}	1
(Hungary) Márton Fucsovics	6^{4}	7^{7}	6
(Italy) Lorenzo Giustino	4	6	3
7	(Serbia) Laslo Đere	6	2	6

Final
(Hungary) Márton Fucsovics	4	7^{9}	6
7	(Serbia) Laslo Đere	6	6^{7}	2

=== Top half ===
First round
1	(Slovakia) A Martin	3	1
(Czech Republic) J Šátral	6	6
(Argentina) M González	6^{2}	4
WC	(Italy) G Mager	7^{7}	6
(Spain) R Ramírez Hidalgo	4	4
WC	(Italy) M Berrettini	6	6
(United States) M Krueger	2	6	6^{5}
5	(Germany) M Marterer	6	1	7^{7}
3	(Austria) G Melzer	6	3	2
Q	(Italy) Edoardo Eremin	4	6	6
(Hungary) M Fucsovics	6	3	6
Q	(Argentina) F Coria	3	6	2
(Argentina) L Mayer	6	7^{7}
(Spain) Í Cervantes	4	6^{4}
WC	(Italy) M Donati	6	2	6
8	(Brazil) J Souza	3	6	2

Second round
(Czech Republic) J Šátral	6	6
WC	(Italy) G Mager	4	4
WC	(Italy) M Berrettini	6	6
5	(Germany) M Marterer	3	2
Q	(Italy) E Eremin	2	5
(Hungary) M Fucsovics	6	7
(Argentina) L Mayer	6	1	2
WC	(Italy) M Donati	3	6	6

Quarterfinals
(Czech Republic) J Šátral	7^{7}	6
WC	(Italy) M Berrettini	6^{4}	3
(Hungary) M Fucsovics	7	6
WC	(Italy) M Donati	5	1

Semifinals
(Czech Republic) J Šátral	7^{7}	6^{2}	1
(Hungary) M Fucsovics	6^{4}	7^{7}	6

=== Bottom half ===
First round
6	(Spain) R Carballés Baena	0	1
Q	(Germany) C-M Stebe	6	6
PR	(Spain) D Muñoz de la Nava	6	6
(Canada) S Diez	4	0
(Italy) S Caruso	6	6
Q	(Slovenia) B Rola	4	3
(Italy) L Giustino	6	6
4	(Argentina) G Andreozzi	3	2
7	(Serbia) L Đere	1	3
SE	(Australia) B Mott	6	0^{r}
(Chile) C Garin	6	6
(Belgium) J De Loore	4	1
SE	(Portugal) J Domingues	6	3	6
(Belarus) U Ignatik	4	6	3
WC	(Serbia) F Krajinović	6	3	6
2	(Italy) A Giannessi	3	6	3

Second round
Q	(Germany) C-M Stebe	3	4
PR	(Spain) D Muñoz de la Nava	6	6
(Italy) S Caruso	1	2
(Italy) L Giustino	6	6
7	(Serbia) L Đere	6	4	6
(Chile) C Garin	1	6	3
SE	(Portugal) J Domingues	5	6^{2}
WC	(Serbia) F Krajinović	7	7^{7}

Quarterfinals
PR	(Spain) D Muñoz de la Nava	6	3	2
(Italy) L Giustino	3	6	6
7	(Serbia) L Đere	7^{7}	4	6
WC	(Serbia) F Krajinović	6^{4}	6	4

Semifinals
(Italy) L Giustino	4	6	3
7	(Serbia) L Đere	6	2	6
