= 2014 Internazionali di Tennis Città di Vicenza – Doubles =

Doubles
- 2014 Internazionali di Tennis Città di Vicenza

Final
- Champions: (Slovakia) Andrej Martin (Slovakia) Igor Zelenay
- Runners-up: (Poland) Błażej Koniusz (Poland) Mateusz Kowalczyk
- Score: 6–1, 7–5

Events
Singles	Doubles
Internazionali di Tennis Città di Vicenza	· 2015 →

This was the first edition of the event.

Andrej Martin and Igor Zelenay won the title, defeating Błażej Koniusz and Mateusz Kowalczyk in the final, 6–1, 7–5.

== Seeds ==
1. (Brazil) Marcelo Demoliner / (India) Purav Raja (first round)
2. (Germany) Frank Moser / (Germany) Alexander Satschko (first round)
3. (Canada) Adil Shamasdin / (New Zealand) Artem Sitak (first round)
4. (United States) James Cerretani / (Sweden) Andreas Siljeström (quarterfinals)

== Draw ==
=== Key ===
- Q = Qualifier
- WC = Wild card
- LL = Lucky loser
- Alt = Alternate
- SE = Special exempt
- PR = Protected ranking
- ITF = ITF entry
- JE = Junior exempt
- w/o = Walkover
- r = Retired
- d = Defaulted
- SR = Special ranking

=== Draw ===
First round
1	(Brazil) M Demoliner (India) P Raja	6^{3}	7^{7}	7
(Argentina) M Alund (Argentina) G Pella	7^{7}	6^{3}	10
(Chinese Taipei) H-h Lee (China) Z Zhang	6	6
(Republic of Ireland) J Cluskey (Slovakia) N Gomboš	3	4
4	(United States) J Cerretani (Canada) A Shamasdin	7^{7}	3	10
WC	(Italy) M Cecchinato (Italy) F Cipolla	6^{5}	6	8
(Poland) B Koniusz (Poland) M Kowalczyk	6	7^{7}
(Italy) A Motti (Italy) M Viola	2	6^{2}
WC	(Italy) M Donati (Italy) Edoardo Eremin	4	5
(Argentina) G Andreozzi (Peru) S Galdós	6	7
(Monaco) B Balleret (Brazil) RD da Silva	6	3	[10]
3	(Canada) A Shamasdin (New Zealand) A Sitak	4	6	8
WC	(Italy) Francesco Borgo (Italy) S Travaglia	2	2
PR	(Italy) R Ghedin (Ecuador) G Lapentti	6	6
(Slovakia) A Martin (Slovakia) I Zelenay	6	6^{1}	[10]
2	(Germany) F Moser (Germany) A Satschko	3	7^{7}	[5]

Quarterfinals
(Argentina) M Alund (Argentina) G Pella	7^{7}	4	[10]
(Chinese Taipei) H-h Lee (China) Z Zhang	6^{4}	6	[3]
4	(United States) J Cerretani (Canada) A Shamasdin	3	4
(Poland) B Koniusz (Poland) M Kowalczyk	6	6
(Argentina) G Andreozzi (Peru) S Galdós	7	7^{7}
(Monaco) B Balleret (Brazil) RD da Silva	5	6^{1}
PR	(Italy) R Ghedin (Ecuador) G Lapentti	3	2
(Slovakia) A Martin (Slovakia) I Zelenay	6	6

Semifinals
(Argentina) M Alund (Argentina) G Pella	2	2
(Poland) B Koniusz (Poland) M Kowalczyk	6	6
(Argentina) G Andreozzi (Peru) S Galdós	5	5
(Slovakia) A Martin (Slovakia) I Zelenay	7	7

Final
(Poland) B Koniusz (Poland) M Kowalczyk	1	5
(Slovakia) A Martin (Slovakia) I Zelenay	6	7
