= 2022 Internazionali di Tennis Città di Vicenza =

- Date: 23 – 29 May
- Edition: 7th
- Surface: Clay
- Location: Vicenza, Italy

Champions

Singles
- (Italy) Andrea Pellegrino

Doubles
- (Argentina) Francisco Comesaña / (Italy) Luciano Darderi
← 2019 ·	Internazionali di Tennis Città di Vicenza	· 2023 →

The 2022 Internazionali di Tennis Città di Vicenza was a professional tennis tournament played on clay courts. It was the seventh edition of the tournament which was part of the 2022 ATP Challenger Tour. It took place in Vicenza, Italy between 23 and 29 May 2022.

== Singles main-draw entrants ==
=== Seeds ===
Country	Player	Rank^{1}	Seed
ITA	Gianluca Mager	119	1
ARG	Juan Manuel Cerúndolo	132	2
ITA	Andreas Seppi	137	3
ITA	Flavio Cobolli	153	4
ARG	Renzo Olivo	176	5
KAZ	Dmitry Popko	180	6
ITA	Lorenzo Giustino	205	7
ITA	Salvatore Caruso	207	8

- ^{1} Rankings are as of 16 May 2022.

=== Other entrants ===
The following players received wildcards into the singles main draw:

- (Italy) Salvatore Caruso
- (Italy) Matteo Gigante
- (Italy) Francesco Passaro

The following players received entry into the singles main draw as special exempts:

- (Italy) Matteo Arnaldi
- (Italy) Francesco Maestrelli

The following players received entry into the singles main draw as alternates:

- (Italy) Luciano Darderi
- (Brazil) Daniel Dutra da Silva
- (Bosnia and Herzegovina) Nerman Fatić
- (Canada) Alexis Galarneau
- (France) Maxime Janvier
- (Italy) Andrea Pellegrino

The following players received entry from the qualifying draw:

- (Colombia) Nicolás Barrientos
- (Argentina) Francisco Comesaña
- (France) Kenny de Schepper
- (Italy) Giovanni Fonio
- (Latvia) ~~Ernests Gulbis~~
- (Ukraine) Oleg Prihodko

The following player received entry as a lucky loser:

- Yan Bondarevskiy

== Champions ==
=== Singles ===
- (Italy) Andrea Pellegrino def. (Argentina) Andrea Collarini 6–1, 6–4.

=== Doubles ===
- (Argentina) Francisco Comesaña / (Italy) Luciano Darderi def. (Italy) Matteo Gigante / (Italy) Francesco Passaro 6–3, 7–6^{(7–4)}.
