= 2014 Internazionali di Tennis Città di Vicenza – Singles =

Singles
- 2014 Internazionali di Tennis Città di Vicenza

Final
- Champion: (Serbia) Filip Krajinović
- Runner-up: (Slovakia) Norbert Gombos
- Score: 6–4, 6–4

Events
| Singles | Doubles |
| Internazionali di Tennis Città di Vicenza | · 2015 → |

This was the first edition of the tournament.

Filip Krajinović won the title, defeating Norbert Gombos in the final, 6–4, 6–4.

== Seeds ==
1. (Germany) Peter Gojowczyk (withdrew)
2. (Argentina) Guido Pella (first round)
3. (Slovenia) Blaž Kavčič (first round)
4. (Argentina) Guido Andreozzi (first round)
5. (Italy) Marco Cecchinato (first round)
6. (Slovakia) Andrej Martin (quarterfinals)
7. (Slovakia) Norbert Gombos (final)
8. (Belgium) Ruben Bemelmans (quarterfinals)

== Draw ==
=== Key ===
- Q = Qualifier
- WC = Wild card
- LL = Lucky loser
- Alt = Alternate
- SE = Special exempt
- PR = Protected ranking
- ITF = ITF entry
- JE = Junior exempt
- w/o = Walkover
- r = Retired
- d = Defaulted
- SR = Special ranking

=== Finals ===
Semifinals
Q | (Japan) Yoshihito Nishioka | 6 | 2 | 4
(Serbia) Filip Krajinović | 3 | 6 | 6
7 | (Slovakia) Norbert Gombos | 6 | 6
(Spain) G Granollers | 3 | 3

Final
(Serbia) Filip Krajinović | 6 | 6
7 | (Slovakia) Norbert Gombos | 4 | 4

=== Top half ===
First round
LL | (Monaco) B Balleret | 3 | 6 | 1
Q | (Japan) Y Nishioka | 6 | 3 | 6
(Italy) F Cipolla | 3 | 7^{8} | 6
(Spain) RC Baena | 6 | 6^{6} | 3
WC | (Italy) S Napolitano | 6 | 2 | 3
(Italy) M Viola | 2 | 6 | 6
(Italy) L Giustino | 3 | 1
6 | (Slovakia) A Martin | 6 | 6
4 | (Argentina) G Andreozzi | 5 | 7^{7} | 5
(Argentina) JI Londero | 7 | 6^{3} | 7
(Ecuador) E Gómez | 6 | 6
WC | (Italy) R Bellotti | 1 | 1
(Brazil) RD da Silva | 6 | 3 | 6^{3}
(Serbia) F Krajinović | 3 | 6 | 7^{7}
(Argentina) A Collarini | 7^{7} | 6
5 | (Italy) M Cecchinato | 6^{4} | 2

Second round
Q | (Japan) Y Nishioka | 6^{8} | 6 | 6
(Italy) F Cipolla | 7^{10} | 1 | 1
(Italy) M Viola | 6 | 6^{4} | 2
6 | (Slovakia) A Martin | 2 | 7^{7} | 6
(Argentina) JI Londero | 6 | 6
(Ecuador) E Gómez | 3 | 4
(Serbia) F Krajinović | 2 | 7^{7} | 6
(Argentina) A Collarini | 6 | 6^{4} | 3

Quarterfinals
Q | (Japan) Y Nishioka | 6 | 6
6 | (Slovakia) A Martin | 3 | 4
(Argentina) JI Londero | 4 | 5
(Serbia) F Krajinović | 6 | 7

Semifinals
Q | (Japan) Y Nishioka | 6 | 2 | 4
(Serbia) F Krajinović | 3 | 6 | 6

=== Bottom half ===
First round
7 | (Slovakia) N Gombos | 6 | 6
Q | (China) Z Zhang | 4 | 2
Q | (Italy) A Brizzi | 6 | 3 | 6
(Argentina) A Velotti | 4 | 6 | 3
PR | (Ecuador) G Lapentti | 6^{4} | 3
WC | (Italy) M Donati | 7^{7} | 6
Q | (Chile) G Lama | 6 | 6
3 | (Slovenia) B Kavčič | 1 | 2
8 | (Belgium) R Bemelmans | 7 | 4 | 6
WC | (Italy) S Travaglia | 5 | 6 | 1
(Spain) JS Montaña | 6 | 4 | 6
(Germany) M Bachinger | 4 | 6 | 3
(Serbia) I Bozoljac | 6 | 6
(Argentina) M Alund | 3 | 2
(Spain) G Granollers | 1 | 6 | 7^{7}
2 | (Argentina) G Pella | 6 | 4 | 6^{5}

Second round
7 | (Slovakia) N Gombos | 6 | 7
Q | (Italy) A Brizzi | 2 | 5
WC | (Italy) M Donati | 6^{5} | 6 | 6
Q | (Chile) G Lama | 7^{7} | 4 | 2
8 | (Belgium) R Bemelmans | 6 | 6
(Spain) JS Montaña | 1 | 2
(Serbia) I Bozoljac | 2 | 6 | 6^{3}
(Spain) G Granollers | 6 | 2 | 7^{7}

Quarterfinals
7 | (Slovakia) N Gombos | 6 | 6
WC | (Italy) M Donati | 0 | 2
8 | (Belgium) R Bemelmans | 5 | 6 | 5
(Spain) G Granollers | 7 | 1 | 7

Semifinals
7 | (Slovakia) N Gombos | 6 | 6
(Spain) G Granollers | 3 | 3
