= 2016 Internazionali di Tennis Città di Vicenza – Singles =

Singles
- 2016 Internazionali di Tennis Città di Vicenza

Final
- Champion: (Argentina) Guido Andreozzi
- Runner-up: (Spain) Pere Riba
- Score: 6–0, ret.

Events
Singles	Doubles
← 2015 ·	Internazionali di Tennis Città di Vicenza	· 2017 →

Íñigo Cervantes was the defending champion, but chose not to defend his title.

Guido Andreozzi won the title when Pere Riba retired in the final.

== Seeds ==
1. (Portugal) Gastão Elias (semifinals)
2. (Germany) Daniel Brands (second round)
3. (Brazil) Thiago Monteiro (first round)
4. (Colombia) Alejandro González (second round)
5. (Argentina) Renzo Olivo (first round)
6. (Argentina) Nicolás Kicker (quarterfinals)
7. (Italy) Luca Vanni (second round)
8. (Spain) Daniel Gimeno-Traver (quarterfinals)

== Draw ==
=== Key ===
- Q = Qualifier
- WC = Wild card
- LL = Lucky loser
- Alt = Alternate
- SE = Special exempt
- PR = Protected ranking
- ITF = ITF entry
- JE = Junior exempt
- w/o = Walkover
- r = Retired
- d = Defaulted
- SR = Special ranking

=== Finals ===
Semifinals
1	(Portugal) Gastão Elias	5	1
(Argentina) Guido Andreozzi	7	6
WC	(Italy) Edoardo Eremin	7^{7}	3	5
Q	(Spain) Pere Riba	6^{2}	6	7

Final
(Argentina) Guido Andreozzi	6	0
Q	(Spain) Pere Riba	0	0^{r}

=== Top half ===
First round
1	(Portugal) G Elias	6	6
(Brazil) G Clezar	4	4
Q	(Croatia) V Galović	4	6	6
(Russia) A Rublev	6	2	2
Alt	(Italy) F Volandri	7^{10}	6
(Hungary) M Fucsovics	6^{8}	2
(Italy) A Arnaboldi	4	1
6	(Argentina) N Kicker	6	6
4	(Colombia) A González	7^{7}	4	6
WC	(Italy) Francisco Bahamonde	6^{4}	6	4
(Argentina) G Andreozzi	6	3	6
(Chile) G Lama	2	6	0
Q	(Bosnia and Herzegovina) T Brkić	6	6
Q	(Italy) S Napolitano	3	1
WC	(Italy) L Sonego	7	4	4
8	(Spain) D Gimeno-Traver	5	6	6

Second round
1	(Portugal) G Elias	6	6
Q	(Croatia) V Galović	4	1
Alt	(Italy) F Volandri	2	1
6	(Argentina) N Kicker	6	6
4	(Colombia) A González	2	1
(Argentina) G Andreozzi	6	6
Q	(Bosnia and Herzegovina) T Brkić	6	5	3
8	(Spain) D Gimeno-Traver	4	7	6

Quarterfinals
1	(Portugal) G Elias	6	6
6	(Argentina) N Kicker	3	4
(Argentina) G Andreozzi	6	6
8	(Spain) D Gimeno-Traver	3	2

Semifinals
1	(Portugal) G Elias	5	1
(Argentina) G Andreozzi	7	6

=== Bottom half ===
First round
5	(Argentina) R Olivo	3	4
(United States) S Kozlov	6	6
(Belgium) K Coppejans	5	7	6
SE	(Belgium) J De Loore	7	5	3
WC	(Italy) M Donati	4	6^{4}
(Switzerland) H Laaksonen	6	7^{7}
WC	(Italy) Edoardo Eremin	2	7^{7}	7^{7}
3	(Brazil) T Monteiro	6	6^{3}	6^{3}
7	(Italy) L Vanni	2	6	6
(Brazil) J Souza	6	4	4
(Belgium) R Bemelmans	6^{6}	6	3
(Kazakhstan) A Golubev	7^{8}	4	6
(Slovakia) N Gombos	6	4	2
Q	(Spain) P Riba	4	6	6
PR	(Germany) J Reister	7^{7}	4	3
2	(Germany) D Brands	6^{3}	6	6

Second round
(United States) S Kozlov	6	6
(Belgium) K Coppejans	4	4
(Switzerland) H Laaksonen	3	7^{7}	2
WC	(Italy) E Eremin	6	6^{4}	6
7	(Italy) L Vanni	5	4
(Kazakhstan) A Golubev	7	6
Q	(Spain) P Riba	6^{4}	7	6
2	(Germany) D Brands	7^{7}	5	1

Quarterfinals
(United States) S Kozlov	1	6	3
WC	(Italy) E Eremin	6	3	6
(Kazakhstan) A Golubev	6	2	2
Q	(Spain) P Riba	1	6	6

Semifinals
WC	(Italy) E Eremin	7^{7}	3	5
Q	(Spain) P Riba	6^{2}	6	7
