= 2015 Internazionali di Tennis Città di Vicenza – Singles =

Singles
- 2015 Internazionali di Tennis Città di Vicenza

Final
- Champions: (Spain) Íñigo Cervantes
- Runners-up: (Australia) John Millman
- Score: 6–4, 6–2

Events
| Singles | Doubles |
| ← 2014 · | Internazionali di Tennis Città di Vicenza | · 2016 → |

Filip Krajinović was the defending champion, but he did not participate, as he played at 2015 French Open during that week.

Íñigo Cervantes won the tournament, defeating John Millman in the final.

== Seeds ==
1. (Argentina) Facundo Bagnis (quarterfinals)
2. (Slovakia) Norbert Gombos (first round)
3. (United Kingdom) James Ward (first round)
4. (Argentina) Guido Pella (quarterfinals)
5. (Spain) Albert Montañés (first round)
6. (Australia) John Millman (final)
7. (Netherlands) Thiemo de Bakker (semifinals)
8. (United States) Bjorn Fratangelo (semifinals)

== Draw ==
=== Key ===
- Q = Qualifier
- WC = Wild card
- LL = Lucky loser
- Alt = Alternate
- SE = Special exempt
- PR = Protected ranking
- ITF = ITF entry
- JE = Junior exempt
- w/o = Walkover
- r = Retired
- d = Defaulted
- SR = Special ranking

=== Finals ===
Semifinals
7 | (Netherlands) Thiemo de Bakker | 6 | 3 | 6^{5}
6 | (Australia) John Millman | 2 | 6 | 7^{7}
8 | (United States) Bjorn Fratangelo | 7^{7} | 3 | 2
(Spain) Íñigo Cervantes | 6^{5} | 6 | 6

Final
6 | (Australia) John Millman | 4 | 2
(Spain) Íñigo Cervantes | 6 | 6

=== Top half ===
First round
1 | (Argentina) F Bagnis | 6 | 6
WC | (Italy) S Caruso | 2 | 3
(Brazil) G Clezar | 7^{9} | 6^{1} | 6
(Canada) F Dancevic | 6^{7} | 7^{7} | 3
(United States) C Buchanan | 4 | 3
(Argentina) R Olivo | 6 | 6
WC | (Italy) S Napolitano | 5 | 2
7 | (Netherlands) T de Bakker | 7 | 6
3 | (United Kingdom) J Ward | 0 | 2
(Italy) F Volandri | 6 | 6
Q | (Argentina) P Cachin | 6 | 7
SE | (France) R Boutillier | 3 | 5
(Czech Republic) A Pavlásek | 6 | 6
(United States) D Novikov | 4 | 2
Q | (Russia) A Rublev | 6 | 3 | 3
6 | (Australia) J Millman | 4 | 6 | 6

Second round
1 | (Argentina) F Bagnis | 6 | 6
(Brazil) G Clezar | 3 | 4
(Argentina) R Olivo | 4 | 0
7 | (Netherlands) T de Bakker | 6 | 6
(Italy) F Volandri | 3 | 6^{4}
Q | (Argentina) P Cachin | 6 | 7^{7}
(Czech Republic) A Pavlásek | 3 | 2
6 | (Australia) J Millman | 6 | 6

Quarterfinals
1 | (Argentina) F Bagnis | 4 | 6 | 3
7 | (Netherlands) T de Bakker | 6 | 3 | 6
Q | (Argentina) P Cachin | 3 | 7^{7} | 1
6 | (Australia) J Millman | 6 | 6^{4} | 6

Semifinals
7 | (Netherlands) T de Bakker | 6 | 3 | 6^{5}
6 | (Australia) J Millman | 2 | 6 | 7^{7}

=== Bottom half ===
First round
8 | (United States) B Fratangelo | 6 | 6
(Italy) R Marcora | 4 | 1
Q | (Brazil) J Pereira | 5 | 2
WC | (Italy) M Donati | 7 | 6
WC | (Italy) F Gaio | 6 | 7
(Republic of Ireland) J McGee | 4 | 5
Q | (Italy) M Viola | 4 | 2
4 | (Argentina) G Pella | 6 | 6
5 | (Spain) A Montañés | 3 | 7^{7} | 6
(Dominican Republic) J Hernández | 6 | 6^{5} | 3
(Spain) I Cervantes | 7^{9} | 6
(Italy) T Fabbiano | 6^{7} | 4
(Argentina) G Andreozzi | 6 | 3 | 7^{7}
(Russia) K Khachanov | 4 | 6 | 6^{2}
(Spain) P Riba | 6 | 1 | 6
2 | (Slovakia) N Gombos | 4 | 6 | 3

Second round
8 | (United States) B Fratangelo | 6 | 6
WC | (Italy) M Donati | 4 | 3
WC | (Italy) F Gaio | 2 | 6 | 4
4 | (Argentina) G Pella | 6 | 3 | 6
5 | (Spain) A Montañés | 4 | 1
(Spain) I Cervantes | 6 | 6
(Argentina) G Andreozzi | 6 | 6
(Spain) P Riba | 1 | 3

Quarterfinals
8 | (United States) B Fratangelo | 6 | 6
4 | (Argentina) G Pella | 4 | 3
(Spain) I Cervantes | 6 | 3 | 6
(Argentina) G Andreozzi | 2 | 6 | 3

Semifinals
8 | (United States) B Fratangelo | 7^{7} | 3 | 2
(Spain) I Cervantes | 6^{5} | 6 | 6
