= 2024 Internazionali di Tennis Città di Vicenza – Singles =

Singles
- 2024 Internazionali di Tennis Città di Vicenza

Final
- Champion: (Chinese Taipei) Tseng Chun-hsin
- Runner-up: (Argentina) Marco Trungelliti
- Score: 6–3, 6–2

Events
| Singles | Doubles |
| ← 2023 · | Internazionali di Tennis Città di Vicenza | · 2025 → |

Francisco Comesaña was the defending champion but chose not to defend his title.

Tseng Chun-hsin won the title after defeating Marco Trungelliti 6–3, 6–2 in the final.

== Seeds ==
1. (Italy) Francesco Passaro (semifinals)
2. (Hungary) Zsombor Piros (first round)
3. (Chile) Tomás Barrios Vera (quarterfinals)
4. (Kazakhstan) Denis Yevseyev (first round)
5. (Argentina) Marco Trungelliti (final)
6. (Argentina) Genaro Alberto Olivieri (second round)
7. (Ukraine) Vitaliy Sachko (first round)
8. (Italy) Stefano Travaglia (second round)

== Draw ==
=== Key ===
- Q = Qualifier
- WC = Wild card
- LL = Lucky loser
- Alt = Alternate
- SE = Special exempt
- PR = Protected ranking
- ITF = ITF entry
- JE = Junior exempt
- w/o = Walkover
- r = Retired
- d = Defaulted
- SR = Special ranking

=== Finals ===
Semifinals
1 | (Italy) Francesco Passaro | 3 | 3
Alt | (Chinese Taipei) Tseng Chun-hsin | 6 | 6
5 | (Argentina) Marco Trungelliti | 6 | 4 | 7
(Bosnia and Herzegovina) Nerman Fatić | 3 | 6 | 5

Final
Alt | (Chinese Taipei) Tseng Chun-hsin | 6 | 6
5 | (Argentina) Marco Trungelliti | 3 | 2

=== Top half ===
First round
1 | (Italy) F Passaro | 6 | 6
(France) M Janvier | 1 | 2
(Austria) L Neumayer | 3 | 4
WC | (Italy) M Cecchinato | 6 | 6
Q | (Italy) Federico Iannaccone | 4 | 6 | 1
(Kazakhstan) D Popko | 6 | 2 | 6
Q | (Italy) F Arnaboldi | 7 | 6
7 | (Ukraine) V Sachko | 5 | 1
4 | (Kazakhstan) D Yevseyev | 6^{6} | 3
Alt | (Chinese Taipei) C-h Tseng | 7^{8} | 6
(Bolivia) JC Prado Ángelo | 6 | 6^{2} | 6
Q | (Lithuania) V Gaubas | 4 | 7^{7} | 4
(Bolivia) M Dellien | 6 | 6
Alt | (Turkey) E Kırkın | 3 | 1
Q | (Italy) Samuel Vincent Ruggeri | 2 | 2
8 | (Italy) S Travaglia | 6 | 6

Second round
1 | (Italy) F Passaro | 6 | 6
WC | (Italy) M Cecchinato | 3 | 2
(Kazakhstan) D Popko | 6 | 6
Q | (Italy) F Arnaboldi | 3 | 1
Alt | (Chinese Taipei) C-h Tseng | 7^{7} | 6
(Bolivia) JC Prado Ángelo | 6^{5} | 0
(Bolivia) M Dellien | 6 | 6
8 | (Italy) S Travaglia | 1 | 2

Quarterfinals
1 | (Italy) F Passaro | 6 | 3 | 6
(Kazakhstan) D Popko | 3 | 6 | 4
Alt | (Chinese Taipei) C-h Tseng | 6 | 6
(Bolivia) M Dellien | 4 | 3

Semifinals
1 | (Italy) F Passaro | 3 | 3
Alt | (Chinese Taipei) C-h Tseng | 6 | 6

=== Bottom half ===
First round
5 | (Argentina) M Trungelliti | 6 | 6
WC | (Italy) Lorenzo Carboni | 4 | 2
(Argentina) S Rodríguez Taverna | 6^{6} | 6^{5}
WC | (Italy) J Berrettini | 7^{8} | 7^{7}
(Italy) F Agamenone | 6^{5} | 5
Q | (Italy) G Fonio | 7^{7} | 7
Alt | (Spain) J Barranco Cosano | 1 | 6 | 2
3 | (Chile) T Barrios Vera | 6 | 3 | 6
6 | (Argentina) GA Olivieri | 6 | 6
(Mexico) R Pacheco Méndez | 4 | 3
(Bulgaria) A Andreev | 7^{12} | 7
Q | A Kachmazov | 6^{10} | 5
(Kazakhstan) T Skatov | 4 | 0
(Bosnia and Herzegovina) N Fatić | 6 | 6
(Tunisia) A Dougaz | 7 | 6
2 | (Hungary) Z Piros | 5 | 4

Second round
5 | (Argentina) M Trungelliti | 6 | 6
WC | (Italy) J Berrettini | 4 | 3
Q | (Italy) G Fonio | 5 | 4
3 | (Chile) T Barrios Vera | 7 | 6
6 | (Argentina) GA Olivieri | 3 | 3
(Bulgaria) A Andreev | 6 | 6
(Bosnia and Herzegovina) N Fatić | 6 | 7^{7}
(Tunisia) A Dougaz | 2 | 6^{1}

Quarterfinals
5 | (Argentina) M Trungelliti | 2 | 6 | 7^{7}
3 | (Chile) T Barrios Vera | 6 | 3 | 6^{3}
(Bulgaria) A Andreev | 4 | 3
(Bosnia and Herzegovina) N Fatić | 6 | 6

Semifinals
5 | (Argentina) M Trungelliti | 6 | 4 | 7
(Bosnia and Herzegovina) N Fatić | 3 | 6 | 5
