= 2025 Internazionali di Tennis Città di Vicenza – Singles =

Singles
- 2025 Internazionali di Tennis Città di Vicenza

Final
- Champion: (Chinese Taipei) Tseng Chun-hsin
- Runner-up: (Austria) Lukas Neumayer
- Score: 6–3, 6–4

Events
Singles	Doubles
← 2024 ·	Internazionali di Tennis Città di Vicenza	· 2026 →

Tseng Chun-hsin was the defending champion and successfully defended his title after defeating Lukas Neumayer 6–3, 6–4 in the final.

== Seeds ==
1. (Chinese Taipei) Tseng Chun-hsin (champion)
2. (Switzerland) Jérôme Kym (semifinals, withdrew)
3. (Luxembourg) Chris Rodesch (semifinals)
4. (Peru) Ignacio Buse (quarterfinals)
5. (Croatia) Duje Ajduković (quarterfinals)
6. (Austria) Lukas Neumayer (final)
7. (Italy) Federico Arnaboldi (first round)
8. (Denmark) August Holmgren (first round)

== Draw ==
=== Key ===
- Q = Qualifier
- WC = Wild card
- LL = Lucky loser
- Alt = Alternate
- ITF = ITF entry
- PR = Protected ranking
- SR = Special ranking
- SE = Special exempt
- JE = Junior exempt
- JR = Junior Accelerator Programme entrant
- CO = College Accelerator Programme entrant
- NG = Next Gen Accelerator Program entrant
- w/o = Walkover
- r = Retired
- d = Defaulted

=== Finals ===
Semifinals
1	(Chinese Taipei) Tseng Chun-hsin	6	6
3	(Luxembourg) Chris Rodesch	4	3
6	(Austria) Lukas Neumayer	w/o
2	(Switzerland) Jérôme Kym

Final
1	(Chinese Taipei) Tseng Chun-hsin	6	6
6	(Austria) Lukas Neumayer	3	4

=== Top half ===
First round
1	(Chinese Taipei) C-h Tseng	6	6
(Bolivia) M Dellien	3	3
(Romania) FC Jianu	6^{3}	2
Q	(Italy) F Bondioli	7^{7}	6
Q	(Austria) J Schwärzler	6	4	6
Q	(Peru) G Bueno	4	6	4
Q	(Italy) M Cecchinato	6	6
8	(Denmark) A Holmgren	4	3
3	(Luxembourg) C Rodesch	6	6
Alt	(France) Mathys Erhard	4	3
Q	(Spain) A Santamarta Roig	6^{3}	4
Q	(Slovakia) M Kližan	7^{7}	6
(Argentina) F Mena	6	3	6
(Slovakia) J Kovalík	2	6	1
(Chinese Taipei) Y-h Hsu	6	7^{8}
7	(Italy) F Arnaboldi	2	6^{6}

Second round
1	(Chinese Taipei) C-h Tseng	6	1	6
Q	(Italy) F Bondioli	3	6	3
Q	(Austria) J Schwärzler	6	6
Q	(Italy) M Cecchinato	3	1
3	(Luxembourg) C Rodesch	6	6
Q	(Slovakia) M Kližan	4	3
(Argentina) F Mena	7	7^{8}
(Chinese Taipei) Y-h Hsu	5	6^{6}

Quarterfinals
1	(Chinese Taipei) C-h Tseng	7	6
Q	(Austria) J Schwärzler	5	4
3	(Luxembourg) C Rodesch	6	6
(Argentina) F Mena	3	1

Semifinals
1	(Chinese Taipei) C-h Tseng	6	6
3	(Luxembourg) C Rodesch	4	3

=== Bottom half ===
First round
6	(Austria) L Neumayer	6	5	6
(Mexico) R Pacheco Méndez	2	7	3
(Belgium) G Onclin	1	6^{4}
(Kazakhstan) T Skatov	6	7^{7}
(France) L Pavlovic	4	6	5
WC	(Italy) Luca Castagnola	6	4	7
(Spain) A Moro Cañas	4	6	5
4	(Peru) I Buse	6	2	7
5	(Croatia) D Ajduković	6	3	6
Alt	(Spain) O Roca Batalla	4	6	3
Alt	(Norway) V Durasovic	7^{7}	3	6^{6}
(Paraguay) AD Vallejo	6^{4}	6	7^{8}
WC	(Italy) F Maestrelli	3	5
WC	(Italy) Lorenzo Carboni	6	7
Alt	(Jordan) A Shelbayh	4	7^{8}	0^{r}
2	(Switzerland) J Kym	6	6^{6}	3

Second round
6	(Austria) L Neumayer	3	7^{7}	6
(Kazakhstan) T Skatov	6	6^{3}	4
WC	(Italy) L Castagnola	3	2
4	(Peru) I Buse	6	6
5	(Croatia) D Ajduković	7	6
(Paraguay) AD Vallejo	5	4
WC	(Italy) L Carboni	6^{8}	6	3
2	(Switzerland) J Kym	7^{10}	4	6

Quarterfinals
6	(Austria) L Neumayer	6	2	7^{8}
4	(Peru) I Buse	2	6	6^{6}
5	(Croatia) D Ajduković	7^{10}	6^{3}	6^{6}
2	(Switzerland) J Kym	6^{8}	7^{7}	7^{8}

Semifinals
6	(Austria) L Neumayer	w/o
2	(Switzerland) J Kym
