= 2016 Internazionali di Tennis Città di Vicenza =

- Date: 21–29 May
- Edition: 3rd
- Draw: 32S / 16D
- Prize money: €42,500
- Surface: Clay
- Location: Vicenza, Italy

Champions

Singles
- (Argentina) Guido Andreozzi

Doubles
- (Kazakhstan) Andrey Golubev / (Croatia) Nikola Mektić
← 2015 ·	Internazionali di Tennis Città di Vicenza	· 2017 →

The 2016 Internazionali di Tennis Città di Vicenza was a professional tennis tournament played on clay courts. It was the third edition of the tournament which was part of the 2016 ATP Challenger Tour. It took place in Vicenza, Italy between 21 and 29 May May 2016.

== Singles main-draw entrants ==
=== Seeds ===
Country	Player	Rank^{1}	Seed
POR	Gastão Elias	98	1
GER	Daniel Brands	138	2
BRA	Thiago Monteiro	139	3
COL	Alejandro González	142	4
ARG	Renzo Olivo	145	5
AUS	Nicolás Kicker	150	6
ITA	Luca Vanni	159	7
ESP	Daniel Gimeno Traver	161	8

- ^{1} Rankings are as of May 16, 2015.

=== Other entrants ===
The following players received wildcards into the singles main draw:

- (Italy) Francisco Bahamonde
- (Italy) Lorenzo Sonego
- (Italy) Matteo Donati
- (Italy) Edoardo Eremin

The following players received entry into the singles main draw as special exempt:

- (Belgium) Joris De Loore

The following players entered the singles main draw with a protected ranking:

- (Germany) Julian Reister

The following player entered as an alternate:

- (Italy) Filippo Volandri

The following players received entry from the qualifying draw:

- (Bosnia and Herzegovina) Tomislav Brkić
- (Croatia) Viktor Galović
- (Italy) Stefano Napolitano
- (Spain) Pere Riba

== Champions ==
=== Singles ===
- (Argentina) Guido Andreozzi def. (Spain) Pere Riba, 6–0, ret.

=== Doubles ===
- (Kazakhstan) Andrey Golubev / (Croatia) Nikola Mektić def. (Portugal) Gastão Elias / (Brazil) Fabrício Neis, 6–3, 6–3
