= 2022 Internazionali di Tennis Città di Vicenza – Doubles =

Doubles
- 2022 Internazionali di Tennis Città di Vicenza

Final
- Champions: (Argentina) Francisco Comesaña (Italy) Luciano Darderi
- Runners-up: (Italy) Matteo Gigante (Italy) Francesco Passaro
- Score: 6–3, 7–6^{(7–4)}

Events
Singles	Doubles
- Internazionali di Tennis Città di Vicenza

Gonçalo Oliveira and Andrei Vasilevski were the defending champions but chose not to defend their title.

Francisco Comesaña and Luciano Darderi won the title after defeating Matteo Gigante and Francesco Passaro 6–3, 7–6^{(7–4)} in the final.

== Seeds ==
1. (Colombia) Nicolás Barrientos / (Mexico) Miguel Ángel Reyes-Varela (semifinals)
2. (Italy) Marco Bortolotti / (Spain) Sergio Martos Gornés (quarterfinals)
3. (Romania) Victor Vlad Cornea / (Greece) Petros Tsitsipas (first round)
4. (Argentina) Andrea Collarini / (Argentina) Renzo Olivo (quarterfinals)

== Draw ==
Key

- Q = Qualifier
- WC = Wild card
- LL = Lucky loser
- Alt = Alternate
- ITF = ITF entry
- PR = Protected ranking
- SR = Special ranking
- SE = Special exempt
- JE = Junior exempt
- JR = Junior Accelerator Programme entrant
- CO = College Accelerator Programme entrant
- NG = Next Gen Accelerator Program entrant
- w/o = Walkover
- r = Retired
- d = Defaulted

First round
(United States) Jack Vance (United States) Tennyson Whiting	6
(Italy) R Bonadio (Italy) A Pellegrino	6^{r}
4	(Argentina) A Collarini (Argentina) R Olivo	6	6
(Tunisia) M Echargui (Romania) A Jecan	3	4
(Argentina) F Comesaña (Italy) L Darderi	6	6
WC	(Italy) Mattia Ghedin (Italy) Giovanni Zio	0	3
(Kazakhstan) D Popko (Ukraine) V Sachko	7^{7}	7^{7}
(France) A Reymond (Italy) Augusto Virgili	6^{3}	6^{3}
WC	(Italy) M Gigante (Italy) F Passaro	3	6	[12]
3	(Romania) VV Cornea (Greece) Pe Tsitsipas	6	3	[10]
(Brazil) D Dutra da Silva (Argentina) GA Olivieri	6^{5}	6	[8]
Yan Bondarevskiy (Ukraine) O Prihodko	7^{7}	3	[10]

Quarterfinals
1	(Colombia) N Barrientos (Mexico) MÁ Reyes-Varela	6	7^{7}
(United States) Jac Vance (United States) T Whiting	0	6^{2}
4	(Argentina) A Collarini (Argentina) R Olivo	1	4
(Argentina) F Comesaña (Italy) L Darderi	6	6
(Kazakhstan) D Popko (Ukraine) V Sachko	4	6^{2}
WC	(Italy) M Gigante (Italy) F Passaro	6	7^{7}
Y Bondarevskiy (Ukraine) O Prihodko	6	3	[10]
2	(Italy) M Bortolotti (Spain) S Martos Gornés	3	6	[7]

Semifinals
1	(Colombia) N Barrientos (Mexico) MÁ Reyes-Varela	5	4
(Argentina) F Comesaña (Italy) L Darderi	7	6
WC	(Italy) M Gigante (Italy) F Passaro	7	6
Y Bondarevskiy (Ukraine) O Prihodko	5	4

Final
(Argentina) F Comesaña (Italy) L Darderi	6	7^{7}
WC	(Italy) M Gigante (Italy) F Passaro	3	6^{4}
