= 2014 Internazionali di Tennis Città di Vicenza =

- Date: 26 May – 1 June
- Edition: 1st
- Draw: 32S / 16D
- Prize money: €42,500
- Surface: Clay
- Location: Vicenza, Italy

Champions

Singles
- (Serbia) Filip Krajinović

Doubles
- (Slovakia) Andrej Martin / (Slovakia) Igor Zelenay
Internazionali di Tennis Città di Vicenza	· 2015 →

The 2014 Internazionali di Tennis Città di Vicenza was a professional tennis tournament played on clay courts. It was the first edition of the tournament which was part of the 2014 ATP Challenger Tour. It took place in Vicenza, Italy between 26 May and 1 June 2014.

== Singles main-draw entrants ==
=== Seeds ===
Country	Player	Rank^{1}	Seed
GER	Peter Gojowczyk	111	1
ARG	Guido Pella	120	2
SLO	Blaž Kavčič	122	3
ARG	Guido Andreozzi	149	4
ITA	Marco Cecchinato	153	5
SVK	Andrej Martin	159	6
SVK	Norbert Gomboš	162	7
BEL	Ruben Bemelmans	164	8

- ^{1} Rankings are as of May 19, 2014.

=== Other entrants ===
The following players received wildcards into the singles main draw:

- (Italy) Stefano Napolitano
- (Italy) Riccardo Bellotti
- (Italy) Matteo Donati
- (Italy) Stefano Travaglia

The following players received entry from the qualifying draw:

- (Japan) Yoshihito Nishioka
- (China) Zhang Ze
- (Italy) Alberto Brizzi
- (Chile) Gonzalo Lama

== Doubles main-draw entrants ==
=== Seeds ===
Country	Player	Country	Player	Rank^{1}	Seed
BRA	Marcelo Demoliner	IND	Purav Raja	206	1
GER	Frank Moser	GER	Alexander Satschko	232	2
CAN	Adil Shamasdin	NZL	Artem Sitak	247	3
USA	James Cerretani	SWE	Andreas Siljeström	277	4

- ^{1} Rankings as of May 19, 2014.

=== Other entrants ===
The following pairs received wildcards into the doubles main draw:

- (Italy) Marco Cecchinato / (Italy) Flavio Cipolla
- (Italy) Matteo Donati / (Italy) Edoardo Eremin
- (Italy) Francesco Borgo / (Italy) Stefano Travaglia

== Champions ==
=== Singles ===
- (Serbia) Filip Krajinović def. (Slovakia) Norbert Gomboš, 6–4, 6–4

=== Doubles ===
- (Slovakia) Andrej Martin / (Slovakia) Igor Zelenay def. (Poland) Błażej Koniusz / (Poland) Mateusz Kowalczyk, 6–1, 7–5
