= 2025 Internazionali di Tennis Città di Vicenza – Doubles =

Doubles
- 2025 Internazionali di Tennis Città di Vicenza

Final
- Champions: (Italy) Federico Bondioli (Italy) Stefano Travaglia
- Runners-up: (Denmark) August Holmgren (Denmark) Johannes Ingildsen
- Score: 6–2, 6–1

Events
| Singles | Doubles |
- Internazionali di Tennis Città di Vicenza

Vladyslav Manafov and Patrik Niklas-Salminen were the defending champions but only Niklas-Salminen chose to defend his title, partnering Szymon Walków. They lost in the semifinals to August Holmgren and Johannes Ingildsen.

Federico Bondioli and Stefano Travaglia won the title after defeating Holmgren and Ingildsen 6–2, 6–1 in the final.

== Seeds ==
1. (Spain) David Vega Hernández / (Brazil) Marcelo Zormann (first round)
2. (Ukraine) Denys Molchanov / (Czech Republic) Matěj Vocel (first round)
3. (Bulgaria) Alexander Donski / (Spain) Sergio Martos Gornés (quarterfinals)
4. (Finland) Patrik Niklas-Salminen / (Poland) Szymon Walków (semifinals)

== Draw ==
Key

- Q = Qualifier
- WC = Wild card
- LL = Lucky loser
- Alt = Alternate
- ITF = ITF entry
- PR = Protected ranking
- SR = Special ranking
- SE = Special exempt
- JE = Junior exempt
- JR = Junior Accelerator Programme entrant
- CO = College Accelerator Programme entrant
- NG = Next Gen Accelerator Program entrant
- w/o = Walkover
- r = Retired
- d = Defaulted

=== Draw ===
First round
1 | (Spain) D Vega Hernández (Brazil) M Zormann | 2 | 3
WC | (Italy) F Bondioli (Italy) S Travaglia | 6 | 6
(Bolivia) M Dellien (Mexico) R Pacheco Méndez | 6 | 7
(Canada) C Harper (Italy) F Romano | 3 | 5
3 | (Bulgaria) A Donski (Spain) S Martos Gornés | 6 | 7^{7}
(Chinese Taipei) Y-h Hsu (Hong Kong) C Wong | 2 | 6^{3}
(Venezuela) LD Martínez (Argentina) F Mena | 6 | 6
WC | (Italy) Andrea Albiero (Italy) Riccardo Campagnola | 1 | 4
(Romania) A Jecan (Romania) B Pavel | 6 | 6
(Serbia) I Sabanov (Serbia) M Sabanov | 1 | 4
(Peru) I Buse (Spain) B Pujol Navarro | 4 | 6^{4}
4 | (Finland) P Niklas-Salminen (Poland) S Walków | 6 | 7^{7}
(Netherlands) M Hermans (Italy) G Ricca | 2 | 6^{5}
(Czech Republic) Jiří Barnat (Czech Republic) F Duda | 6 | 7^{7}
(Denmark) A Holmgren (Denmark) J Ingildsen | 7^{7} | 4 | [10]
2 | (Ukraine) D Molchanov (Czech Republic) M Vocel | 6^{5} | 6 | [6]

Quarterfinals
WC | (Italy) F Bondioli (Italy) S Travaglia | 6 | 7
(Bolivia) M Dellien (Mexico) R Pacheco Méndez | 3 | 5
3 | (Bulgaria) A Donski (Spain) S Martos Gornés | 4 | 2
(Venezuela) LD Martínez (Argentina) F Mena | 6 | 6
(Romania) A Jecan (Romania) B Pavel | 6 | 3 | [8]
4 | (Finland) P Niklas-Salminen (Poland) S Walków | 3 | 6 | [10]
(Czech Republic) J Barnat (Czech Republic) F Duda | 6 | 3 | [9]
(Denmark) A Holmgren (Denmark) J Ingildsen | 2 | 6 | [11]

Semifinals
WC | (Italy) F Bondioli (Italy) S Travaglia | 6 | 3 | [10]
(Venezuela) LD Martínez (Argentina) F Mena | 3 | 6 | [7]
4 | (Finland) P Niklas-Salminen (Poland) S Walków | 3 | 4
(Denmark) A Holmgren (Denmark) J Ingildsen | 6 | 6

Final
WC | (Italy) F Bondioli (Italy) S Travaglia | 6 | 6
(Denmark) A Holmgren (Denmark) J Ingildsen | 2 | 1
