= 2015 Internazionali di Tennis Città di Vicenza =

- Date: 25–31 May
- Edition: 2nd
- Draw: 32S / 16D
- Prize money: €42,500
- Surface: Clay
- Location: Vicenza, Italy

Champions

Singles
- (Spain) Íñigo Cervantes

Doubles
- (Argentina) Facundo Bagnis / (Argentina) Guido Pella
← 2014 ·	Internazionali di Tennis Città di Vicenza	· 2016 →

The 2015 Internazionali di Tennis Città di Vicenza was a professional tennis tournament played on clay courts. It was the second edition of the tournament which was part of the 2015 ATP Challenger Tour. It took place in Vicenza, Italy between 25 and 31 May May 2015.

== Singles main-draw entrants ==
=== Seeds ===
Country	Player	Rank^{1}	Seed
ARG	Facundo Bagnis	95	1
SVK	Norbert Gombos	105	2
GBR	James Ward	106	3
ARG	Guido Pella	114	4
ESP	Albert Montañés	129	5
AUS	John Millman	133	6
NED	Thiemo de Bakker	134	7
USA	Bjorn Fratangelo	147	8

- ^{1} Rankings are as of .

=== Other entrants ===
The following players received wildcards into the singles main draw:

- (Italy) Salvatore Caruso
- (Italy) Matteo Donati
- (Italy) Federico Gaio
- (Italy) Stefano Napolitano

The following player received entry into the singles main draw as special exempt:

- (France) Rémi Boutillier

The following players received entry from the qualifying draw:

- (Argentina) Pedro Cachin
- (Brazil) José Pereira
- (Russia) Andrey Rublev
- (Italy) Matteo Viola

== Champions ==
=== Singles ===
- (Spain) Íñigo Cervantes def. (Australia) John Millman 6–4, 6–2

=== Doubles ===
- (Argentina) Facundo Bagnis / (Argentina) Guido Pella def. (Italy) Salvatore Caruso / (Italy) Federico Gaio 6–2, 6–4
