= 2016 Internazionali di Tennis Città di Vicenza – Doubles =

Doubles
- 2016 Internazionali di Tennis Città di Vicenza

Final
- Champions: (Kazakhstan) Andrey Golubev (Croatia) Nikola Mektić
- Runners-up: (Portugal) Gastão Elias (Brazil) Fabrício Neis
- Score: 6–3, 6–3

Events
Singles	Doubles
- Internazionali di Tennis Città di Vicenza

Facundo Bagnis and Guido Pella were the defending champions but chose not to defend their title.

Andrey Golubev and Nikola Mektić won the title after defeating Gastão Elias and Fabrício Neis 6–3, 6–3 in the final.

== Seeds ==
1. (Australia) Rameez Junaid / (Austria) Philipp Oswald (semifinals)
2. (Poland) Tomasz Bednarek / (Germany) Frank Moser (first round)
3. (Chinese Taipei) Hsieh Cheng-peng / (Chinese Taipei) Yang Tsung-hua (quarterfinals)
4. (Kazakhstan) Andrey Golubev / (Croatia) Nikola Mektić (champions)

== Draw ==
Key

- Q = Qualifier
- WC = Wild card
- LL = Lucky loser
- Alt = Alternate
- ITF = ITF entry
- PR = Protected ranking
- SR = Special ranking
- SE = Special exempt
- JE = Junior exempt
- JR = Junior Accelerator Programme entrant
- CO = College Accelerator Programme entrant
- NG = Next Gen Accelerator Program entrant
- w/o = Walkover
- r = Retired
- d = Defaulted

First round
1	(Australia) R Junaid (Austria) P Oswald	3	6	[10]
(Italy) F Gaio (Italy) L Vanni	6	3	[8]
WC	(Italy) M Donati (Italy) S Napolitano
(Peru) S Galdós (Argentina) R Olivo	w/o
4	(Kazakhstan) A Golubev (Croatia) N Mektić	7^{7}	6
(El Salvador) M Arévalo (Hungary) M Fucsovics	6^{3}	3
(Uruguay) A Behar (Chile) G Lama	7	6
WC	(Italy) Nicola Ghedin (Portugal) G Oliveira	5	2
(Brazil) G Clezar (Brazil) J Souza	4	4
WC	(Italy) Omar Giacalone (Italy) M Viola	6	6
(Chile) H Podlipnik (Brazil) C Zampieri	3	6^{6}
3	(Chinese Taipei) C-p Hsieh (Chinese Taipei) T-h Yang	6	7^{8}
PR	(Italy) A Motti (Germany) J Reister	6^{4}	1
(Portugal) G Elias (Brazil) F Neis	7^{7}	6
(Belgium) R Bemelmans (Belgium) K Coppejans	7^{13}	7^{7}
2	(Poland) T Bednarek (Germany) F Moser	6^{11}	6^{3}

Quarterfinals
1	(Australia) R Junaid (Austria) P Oswald	6	6
(Peru) S Galdós (Argentina) R Olivo	3	4
4	(Kazakhstan) A Golubev (Croatia) N Mektić	6	6
(Uruguay) A Behar (Chile) G Lama	4	4
WC	(Italy) O Giacalone (Italy) M Viola	7	7^{7}
3	(Chinese Taipei) C-p Hsieh (Chinese Taipei) T-h Yang	5	6^{4}
(Portugal) G Elias (Brazil) F Neis	7^{7}	6
(Belgium) R Bemelmans (Belgium) K Coppejans	6^{4}	3

Semifinals
1	(Australia) R Junaid (Austria) P Oswald	6^{4}	3
4	(Kazakhstan) A Golubev (Croatia) N Mektić	7^{6}	6
WC	(Italy) O Giacalone (Italy) M Viola	4	6	[7]
(Portugal) G Elias (Brazil) F Neis	6	3	[10]

Final
4	(Kazakhstan) A Golubev (Croatia) N Mektić	6	6
(Portugal) G Elias (Brazil) F Neis	3	3
