= 2024 Internazionali di Tennis Città di Vicenza =

- Date: 27 May – 2 June
- Edition: 9th
- Surface: Clay
- Location: Vicenza, Italy

Champions

Singles
- (Chinese Taipei) Tseng Chun-hsin

Doubles
- (Ukraine) Vladyslav Manafov / (Finland) Patrik Niklas-Salminen
← 2023 ·	Internazionali di Tennis Città di Vicenza	· 2025 →

The 2024 Internazionali di Tennis Città di Vicenza was a professional tennis tournament played on clay courts. It was the ninth edition of the tournament which was part of the 2024 ATP Challenger Tour. It took place in Vicenza, Italy between 27 May and 2 June 2024.

== Singles main-draw entrants ==
=== Seeds ===
Country	Player	Rank^{1}	Seed
ITA	Francesco Passaro	133	1
HUN	Zsombor Piros	154	2
CHI	Tomás Barrios Vera	157	3
KAZ	Denis Yevseyev	167	4
ARG	Marco Trungelliti	169	5
ARG	Genaro Alberto Olivieri	188	6
UKR	Vitaliy Sachko	192	7
ITA	Stefano Travaglia	194	8

- ^{1} Rankings are as of 20 May 2024.

=== Other entrants ===
The following players received wildcards into the singles main draw:

- (Italy) Jacopo Berrettini
- (Italy) Lorenzo Carboni
- (Italy) Marco Cecchinato

The following players received entry into the singles main draw as alternates:

- (Spain) Javier Barranco Cosano
- (Turkey) Ergi Kırkın
- (Chinese Taipei) Tseng Chun-hsin

The following players received entry from the qualifying draw:

- (Italy) Federico Arnaboldi
- (Italy) Giovanni Fonio
- (Lithuania) Vilius Gaubas
- (Italy) Federico Iannaccone
- Alibek Kachmazov
- (Italy) Samuel Vincent Ruggeri

== Champions ==
=== Singles ===
- (Chinese Taipei) Tseng Chun-hsin def. (Argentina) Marco Trungelliti 6–3, 6–2.

=== Doubles ===
- (Ukraine) Vladyslav Manafov / (Finland) Patrik Niklas-Salminen def. (Germany) Andre Begemann / (India) Niki Kaliyanda Poonacha 6–3, 6–4.
