= 2019 Internazionali di Tennis Città di Vicenza – Singles =

Singles
- 2019 Internazionali di Tennis Città di Vicenza

Final
- Champion: (Italy) Alessandro Giannessi
- Runner-up: (Italy) Filippo Baldi
- Score: 7–5, 6–2

Events
| Singles | Doubles |
- Internazionali di Tennis Città di Vicenza

Hugo Dellien was the defending champion but chose not to defend his title.

Alessandro Giannessi won the title after defeating Filippo Baldi 7–5, 6–2 in the final.

== Seeds ==
All seeds receive a bye into the second round.

1. (Italy) Paolo Lorenzi (third round)
2. (Poland) Kamil Majchrzak (third round)
3. (Portugal) Pedro Sousa (second round)
4. (Argentina) Facundo Bagnis (quarterfinals)
5. (Italy) Gianluca Mager (semifinals)
6. (Spain) Adrián Menéndez Maceiras (third round)
7. (Italy) Lorenzo Giustino (third round)
8. (Italy) Filippo Baldi (final)
9. (Italy) Alessandro Giannessi (champion)
10. (Spain) Enrique López Pérez (second round)
11. (Argentina) Carlos Berlocq (second round)
12. (Italy) Stefano Napolitano (second round)
13. (Italy) Roberto Marcora (second round, retired)
14. (Australia) Marc Polmans (quarterfinals)
15. (Italy) Andrea Arnaboldi (second round)
16. (Croatia) Viktor Galović (second round)

== Draw ==
Key

- Q = Qualifier
- WC = Wild card
- LL = Lucky loser
- Alt = Alternate
- ITF = ITF entry
- PR = Protected ranking
- SR = Special ranking
- SE = Special exempt
- JE = Junior exempt
- JR = Junior Accelerator Programme entrant
- CO = College Accelerator Programme entrant
- NG = Next Gen Accelerator Program entrant
- w/o = Walkover
- r = Retired
- d = Defaulted

=== Finals ===
Quarterfinals
WC | (Italy) Francesco Forti | 1 | 2
5 | (Italy) Gianluca Mager | 6 | 6
14 | (Australia) Marc Polmans | 4 | 5
9 | (Italy) Alessandro Giannessi | 6 | 7
Q | (Germany) Benjamin Hassan | 7 | 3 | 6
4 | (Argentina) Facundo Bagnis | 5 | 6 | 2
8 | (Italy) Filippo Baldi | 7 | 6
LL | (Italy) Andrea Pellegrino | 5 | 2

Semifinals
5 | (Italy) Gianluca Mager | 3 | 3
9 | (Italy) Alessandro Giannessi | 6 | 6
Q | (Germany) Benjamin Hassan | 7^{7} | 4 | 5
8 | (Italy) Filippo Baldi | 6^{3} | 6 | 7

Final
9 | (Italy) Alessandro Giannessi | 7 | 6
8 | (Italy) Filippo Baldi | 5 | 2

=== Top half ===
==== Section 1 ====
First round
(Dominican Republic) R Cid Subervi | 4 | 6 | 3
ITF | (Italy) R Brancaccio | 6 | 4 | 6
(Italy) G Quinzi | 6 | 2 | 4
WC | (Italy) F Forti | 3 | 6 | 6
(Croatia) N Serdarušić | 6 | 4 | 1
(Argentina) F Coria | 1 | 6 | 6
(France) K de Schepper | 0 | 4
WC | (Italy) J Ocleppo | 6 | 6

Second round
1 | (Italy) P Lorenzi | 7 | 4 | 6
ITF | (Italy) R Brancaccio | 5 | 6 | 3
WC | (Italy) F Forti | 6 | 6
16 | (Croatia) V Galović | 3 | 3
10 | (Spain) E López Pérez | 2 | 6 | 2
(Argentina) F Coria | 6 | 2 | 6
WC | (Italy) J Ocleppo | 4 | 7 | 6^{4}
5 | (Italy) G Mager | 6 | 5 | 7^{7}

Third round
1 | (Italy) P Lorenzi | 2 | 5
WC | (Italy) F Forti | 6 | 7
(Argentina) F Coria | 6 | 1 | 5
5 | (Italy) G Mager | 1 | 6 | 7

Quarterfinals
WC | (Italy) F Forti | 1 | 2
5 | (Italy) G Mager | 6 | 6

==== Section 2 ====
First round
WC | (Italy) Luca Giacomini | 6 | 6
(Slovakia) A Molčan | 4 | 2
ITF | (Spain) O Roca Batalla | 6 | 0 | 2
ITF | (Italy) R Bonadio | 2 | 6 | 6
(Argentina) P Cachin | 4 | 2
(Italy) F Gaio | 6 | 6
(Romania) D Dima | 1 | 5
(Germany) D Masur | 6 | 7

Second round
3 | (Portugal) P Sousa | 6 | 6^{3} | 2
WC | (Italy) L Giacomini | 3 | 7^{7} | 6
ITF | (Italy) R Bonadio | 7^{7} | 3 | 6^{9}
14 | (Australia) M Polmans | 6^{3} | 6 | 7^{11}
9 | (Italy) A Giannessi | 6 | 6
(Italy) F Gaio | 3 | 2
(Germany) D Masur | 6^{9} | 3
6 | (Spain) A Menéndez Maceiras | 7^{11} | 6

Third round
WC | (Italy) L Giacomini | 0 | 3
14 | (Australia) M Polmans | 6 | 6
9 | (Italy) A Giannessi | 6 | 6
6 | (Spain) A Menéndez Maceiras | 2 | 0

Quarterfinals
14 | (Australia) M Polmans | 4 | 5
9 | (Italy) A Giannessi | 6 | 7

=== Bottom half ===
==== Section 3 ====
First round
(Portugal) G Oliveira | 1 | 6 | 5
(Ecuador) G Escobar | 6 | 4 | 7
Q | (Germany) B Hassan | 1 | 6 | 6
(Argentina) F Argüello | 6 | 1 | 3
Alt | (Italy) M Bortolotti | 5 | 7 | 6
WC | (Italy) G Zeppieri | 7 | 5 | 2
ITF | (Spain) J Barranco Cosano | 7^{7} | 6^{4} | 4
(Japan) Yo Watanuki | 6^{3} | 7^{7} | 6

Second round
7 | (Italy) L Giustino | 6^{0} | 6 | 7
(Ecuador) G Escobar | 7^{7} | 2 | 5
Q | (Germany) B Hassan | 0 | 6 | 6
12 | (Italy) S Napolitano | 6 | 3 | 3
13 | (Italy) R Marcora | 3 | 0^{r}
Alt | (Italy) M Bortolotti | 6 | 2
(Japan) Yo Watanuki | 1 | 1
4 | (Argentina) F Bagnis | 6 | 6

Third round
7 | (Italy) L Giustino | 1 | 3
Q | (Germany) B Hassan | 6 | 6
Alt | (Italy) M Bortolotti | 6^{5} | 6 | 3
4 | (Argentina) F Bagnis | 7^{7} | 1 | 6

Quarterfinals
Q | (Germany) B Hassan | 7 | 3 | 6
4 | (Argentina) F Bagnis | 5 | 6 | 2

==== Section 4 ====
First round
(Italy) M Viola | 4 | 1
(Germany) M Moraing | 6 | 6
(Switzerland) M-A Hüsler | 6 | 5 | 3
Q | (Italy) A Vavassori | 2 | 7 | 6
WC | (Italy) L Musetti | 6 | 3 | 4
LL | (Italy) A Pellegrino | 2 | 6 | 6
(Czech Republic) A Pavlásek | 7^{7} | 6
(Serbia) P Krstin | 6^{3} | 1

Second round
8 | (Italy) F Baldi | 6 | 6
(Germany) M Moraing | 2 | 2
Q | (Italy) A Vavassori | 6 | 6
11 | (Argentina) C Berlocq | 4 | 4
15 | (Italy) A Arnaboldi | 2 | 4
LL | (Italy) A Pellegrino | 6 | 6
(Czech Republic) A Pavlásek | 1 | 1
2 | (Poland) K Majchrzak | 6 | 6

Third round
8 | (Italy) F Baldi | 6 | 1 | 7
Q | (Italy) A Vavassori | 3 | 6 | 5
LL | (Italy) A Pellegrino | 7^{7} | 6
2 | (Poland) K Majchrzak | 6^{4} | 3

Quarterfinals
8 | (Italy) F Baldi | 7 | 6
LL | (Italy) A Pellegrino | 5 | 2
