= 2018 Internazionali di Tennis Città di Vicenza – Singles =

Singles
- 2018 Internazionali di Tennis Città di Vicenza

Final
- Champion: (Bolivia) Hugo Dellien
- Runner-up: (Italy) Matteo Donati
- Score: 6–4, 5–7, 6–4

Events
Singles	Doubles
- Internazionali di Tennis Città di Vicenza

Márton Fucsovics was the defending champion but chose not to defend his title.

Hugo Dellien won the title after defeating Matteo Donati 6–4, 5–7, 6–4 in the final.

== Seeds ==
1. (Italy) Lorenzo Sonego (first round)
2. (Germany) Yannick Maden (first round)
3. (Austria) Sebastian Ofner (second round)
4. (Bolivia) Hugo Dellien (champion)
5. (Italy) Stefano Travaglia (quarterfinals, retired)
6. (Germany) Matthias Bachinger (first round, retired)
7. (Australia) Jason Kubler (first round)
8. (Dominican Republic) Víctor Estrella Burgos (first round)

== Draw ==
Key

- Q = Qualifier
- WC = Wild card
- LL = Lucky loser
- Alt = Alternate
- ITF = ITF entry
- PR = Protected ranking
- SR = Special ranking
- SE = Special exempt
- JE = Junior exempt
- JR = Junior Accelerator Programme entrant
- CO = College Accelerator Programme entrant
- NG = Next Gen Accelerator Program entrant
- w/o = Walkover
- r = Retired
- d = Defaulted

=== Finals ===
Semifinals
WC	(Italy) Gian Marco Moroni	4	4
4	(Bolivia) Hugo Dellien	6	6
(Italy) Salvatore Caruso	5	3
WC	(Italy) Matteo Donati	7	6

Final
4	(Bolivia) Hugo Dellien	6	5	6
WC	(Italy) Matteo Donati	4	7	4

=== Top half ===
First round
1	(Italy) L Sonego	6	3	4
LL	(Brazil) G Clezar	3	6	6
Q	(Italy) G Mager	2	3
SE	(Italy) G Quinzi	6	6
(Spain) D Gimeno Traver	6	6
(Portugal) G Oliveira	3	4
WC	(Italy) GM Moroni	6	6
8	(Dominican Republic) V Estrella Burgos	1	4
4	(Bolivia) H Dellien	6	5	6
(Spain) E López Pérez	0	7	0
Q	(Australia) M Polmans	6	2	6
(Argentina) F Bagnis	4	6	4
(United States) E King	5	6^{5}
(Argentina) R Olivo	7	7^{7}
Q	(Ecuador) R Quiroz	3	6	3
6	(Germany) M Bachinger	6	3	0^{r}

Second round
LL	(Brazil) G Clezar	6	6
SE	(Italy) G Quinzi	4	3
(Spain) D Gimeno Traver	3	2
WC	(Italy) GM Moroni	6	6
4	(Bolivia) H Dellien	6	6
Q	(Australia) M Polmans	4	2
(Argentina) R Olivo	4	7	1^{r}
Q	(Ecuador) R Quiroz	6	5	2

Quarterfinals
LL	(Brazil) G Clezar	3	2
WC	(Italy) GM Moroni	6	6
4	(Bolivia) H Dellien	6	6
Q	(Ecuador) R Quiroz	1	0

Semifinals
WC	(Italy) GM Moroni	4	4
4	(Bolivia) H Dellien	6	6

=== Bottom half ===
First round
5/WC	(Italy) S Travaglia	6	3	6
(Croatia) V Galović	3	6	4
(Australia) A Santillan	4	6	3
(Czech Republic) Z Kolář	6	3	6
(India) P Gunneswaran	1	4
(Italy) S Caruso	6	6
SE	(Serbia) D Petrović	1^{r}
3	(Austria) S Ofner	1
7	(Australia) J Kubler	6	2	6^{3}
(Serbia) M Kecmanović	1	6	7^{7}
Q	(Uruguay) M Cuevas	7^{9}	6
(France) G Sakharov	6^{7}	2
WC	(Italy) L Caruana	2	2
WC	(Italy) M Donati	6	6
(Portugal) J Domingues	6	5	6
2	(Germany) Y Maden	0	7	3

Second round
5/WC	(Italy) S Travaglia	6	6
(Czech Republic) Z Kolář	4	4
(Italy) S Caruso	7^{7}	6
3	(Austria) S Ofner	6^{3}	3
(Serbia) M Kecmanović	6	6
Q	(Uruguay) M Cuevas	1	0
WC	(Italy) M Donati	6	4	6
(Portugal) J Domingues	4	6	4

Quarterfinals
5/WC	(Italy) S Travaglia	6^{0}	1^{r}
(Italy) S Caruso	7^{7}	2
(Serbia) M Kecmanović	7^{7}	6^{2}	3
WC	(Italy) M Donati	6^{1}	7^{7}	6

Semifinals
(Italy) S Caruso	5	3
WC	(Italy) M Donati	7	6
