= 2019 Internazionali di Tennis Città di Vicenza – Doubles =

Doubles
- 2019 Internazionali di Tennis Città di Vicenza

Final
- Champions: (Portugal) Gonçalo Oliveira (Belarus) Andrei Vasilevski
- Runners-up: (Brazil) Fabrício Neis (Brazil) Fernando Romboli
- Score: 6–3, 6–4

Events
| Singles | Doubles |
- Internazionali di Tennis Città di Vicenza

Ariel Behar and Enrique López Pérez were the defending champions but only Behar chose to defend his title, partnering Gonzalo Escobar. Behar lost in the quarterfinals to Gonçalo Oliveira and Andrei Vasilevski.

Oliveira and Vasilevski won the title after defeating Fabrício Neis and Fernando Romboli 6–3, 6–4 in the final.

== Seeds ==
1. (Portugal) Gonçalo Oliveira / (Belarus) Andrei Vasilevski (champions)
2. (Brazil) Fabrício Neis / (Brazil) Fernando Romboli (final)
3. (Switzerland) Luca Margaroli / (Slovakia) Filip Polášek (quarterfinals)
4. (Monaco) Hugo Nys / (Netherlands) Sem Verbeek (quarterfinals)

== Draw ==
Key

- Q = Qualifier
- WC = Wild card
- LL = Lucky loser
- Alt = Alternate
- ITF = ITF entry
- PR = Protected ranking
- SR = Special ranking
- SE = Special exempt
- JE = Junior exempt
- JR = Junior Accelerator Programme entrant
- CO = College Accelerator Programme entrant
- NG = Next Gen Accelerator Program entrant
- w/o = Walkover
- r = Retired
- d = Defaulted

First round
1 | (Portugal) G Oliveira (Belarus) A Vasilevski | w/o
(Argentina) C Berlocq (Spain) A Menéndez Maceiras
WC | (Italy) J Berrettini (Italy) F Forti | 1 | 6 | [7]
(Uruguay) A Behar (Ecuador) G Escobar | 6 | 4 | [10]
3 | (Switzerland) L Margaroli (Slovakia) F Polášek | w/o
WC | (Italy) F Baldi (Italy) A Pellegrino
(Venezuela) LD Martínez (Italy) A Vavassori | 6 | 7^{7}
ITF | (Italy) M Bortolotti (Australia) S Puodziunas | 2 | 6^{3}
(Chile) H Podlipnik Castillo (Australia) M Polmans | 6 | 6
(Germany) A Begemann (Croatia) A Šančić | 3 | 3
ITF | (Spain) J Barranco Cosano (Italy) R Brancaccio | 1 | 7^{7} | [7]
4 | (Monaco) H Nys (Netherlands) S Verbeek | 6 | 6^{4} | [10]
(Poland) K Majchrzak (Poland) S Walków | 6 | 6
WC | (Italy) Nicola Ghedin (Italy) Luca Giacomini | 2 | 1
(Portugal) P Sousa (Netherlands) M Vervoort | 6^{3} | 3
2 | (Brazil) F Neis (Brazil) F Romboli | 7^{7} | 6

Quarterfinals
1 | (Portugal) G Oliveira (Belarus) A Vasilevski | 6 | 4 | [10]
(Uruguay) A Behar (Ecuador) G Escobar | 4 | 6 | [7]
3 | (Switzerland) L Margaroli (Slovakia) F Polášek | 5 | 6 | [3]
(Venezuela) LD Martínez (Italy) A Vavassori | 7 | 2 | [10]
(Chile) H Podlipnik Castillo (Australia) M Polmans | 1 | 6 | [10]
4 | (Monaco) H Nys (Netherlands) S Verbeek | 6 | 2 | [3]
(Poland) K Majchrzak (Poland) S Walków | 4 | 4
2 | (Brazil) F Neis (Brazil) F Romboli | 6 | 6

Semifinals
1 | (Portugal) G Oliveira (Belarus) A Vasilevski | 6 | 6
(Venezuela) LD Martínez (Italy) A Vavassori | 3 | 4
(Chile) H Podlipnik Castillo (Australia) M Polmans | 6^{0} | 1
2 | (Brazil) F Neis (Brazil) F Romboli | 7^{7} | 6

Final
1 | (Portugal) G Oliveira (Belarus) A Vasilevski | 6 | 6
2 | (Brazil) F Neis (Brazil) F Romboli | 3 | 4
