= 2023 Internazionali di Tennis Città di Vicenza – Doubles =

Doubles
- 2023 Internazionali di Tennis Città di Vicenza

Final
- Champions: (India) Anirudh Chandrasekar (India) Vijay Sundar Prashanth
- Runners-up: (Brazil) Fernando Romboli (Brazil) Marcelo Zormann
- Score: 6–3, 6–2

Events
Singles	Doubles
- Internazionali di Tennis Città di Vicenza

Francisco Comesaña and Luciano Darderi were the defending champions but only Comesaña chose to defend his title, partnering Román Andrés Burruchaga. Comesaña lost in the quarterfinals to Anirudh Chandrasekar and Vijay Sundar Prashanth.

Chandrasekar and Prashanth won the title after defeating Fernando Romboli and Marcelo Zormann 6–3, 6–2 in the final.

== Seeds ==
1. (Italy) Marco Bortolotti / (Spain) Sergio Martos Gornés (quarterfinals)
2. (Ukraine) Vladyslav Manafov / (Poland) Szymon Walków (first round)
3. (India) Anirudh Chandrasekar / (India) Vijay Sundar Prashanth (champions)
4. (Brazil) Fernando Romboli / (Brazil) Marcelo Zormann (final)

== Draw ==
Key

- Q = Qualifier
- WC = Wild card
- LL = Lucky loser
- Alt = Alternate
- ITF = ITF entry
- PR = Protected ranking
- SR = Special ranking
- SE = Special exempt
- JE = Junior exempt
- JR = Junior Accelerator Programme entrant
- CO = College Accelerator Programme entrant
- NG = Next Gen Accelerator Program entrant
- w/o = Walkover
- r = Retired
- d = Defaulted

First round
1	(Italy) M Bortolotti (Spain) S Martos Gornés	6	6
WC	(Italy) G Oradini (Italy) Augusto Virgili	3	0
(Japan) R Noguchi (Australia) A Taylor	6	7^{8}
(India) D Sharan (India) Parikshit Somani	3	6^{6}
4	(Brazil) F Romboli (Brazil) M Zormann	6	7^{7}
(Italy) F Agamenone (Argentina) A Collarini	4	6^{4}
WC	(Italy) F Forti (Italy) G Piraino	5	4
(Argentina) M Navone (Argentina) S Rodríguez Taverna	7	6
Alt	(Argentina) RA Burruchaga (Argentina) F Comesaña	6	3	[10]
(United Kingdom) S Duncan (United Kingdom) M Willis	2	6	[4]
(Czech Republic) V Kopřiva (Czech Republic) J Pospíšil	1	2
3	(India) A Chandrasekar (India) VS Prashanth	6	6
(Peru) A Huertas del Pino (Peru) C Huertas del Pino	2	3
(Brazil) D Dutra da Silva (Brazil) M Pucinelli de Almeida	6	6
(Belgium) K Coppejans (Argentina) M Trungelliti	7^{12}	7
2	(Ukraine) V Manafov (Poland) S Walków	6^{10}	5

Quarterfinals
1	(Italy) M Bortolotti (Spain) S Martos Gornés	6^{3}	3
(Japan) R Noguchi (Australia) A Taylor	7^{7}	6
4	(Brazil) F Romboli (Brazil) M Zormann	6	7
(Argentina) M Navone (Argentina) S Rodríguez Taverna	2	5
Alt	(Argentina) RA Burruchaga (Argentina) F Comesaña	2	2
3	(India) A Chandrasekar (India) VS Prashanth	6	6
(Brazil) D Dutra da Silva (Brazil) M Pucinelli de Almeida	6	6
(Belgium) K Coppejans (Argentina) M Trungelliti	1	4

Semifinals
(Japan) R Noguchi (Australia) A Taylor	2	4
4	(Brazil) F Romboli (Brazil) M Zormann	6	6
3	(India) A Chandrasekar (India) VS Prashanth	6	6
(Brazil) D Dutra da Silva (Brazil) M Pucinelli de Almeida	3	1

Final
4	(Brazil) F Romboli (Brazil) M Zormann	3	2
3	(India) A Chandrasekar (India) VS Prashanth	6	6
