= 2017 Internazionali di Tennis Città di Vicenza – Doubles =

Doubles
- 2017 Internazionali di Tennis Città di Vicenza

Final
- Champions: (Germany) Gero Kretschmer (Germany) Alexander Satschko
- Runners-up: (United States) Sekou Bangoura (Austria) Tristan-Samuel Weissborn
- Score: 6–4, 7–6^{(7–4)}

Events
| Singles | Doubles |
- Internazionali di Tennis Città di Vicenza

Andrey Golubev and Nikola Mektić were the defending champions but chose not to defend their title.

Gero Kretschmer and Alexander Satschko won the title after defeating Sekou Bangoura and Tristan-Samuel Weissborn 6–4, 7–6^{(7–4)} in the final.

== Seeds ==
1. (Uruguay) Ariel Behar / (Belarus) Aliaksandr Bury (first round)
2. (Peru) Sergio Galdós / (Brazil) Caio Zampieri (withdrew)
3. (Germany) Andreas Mies / (United States) Max Schnur (first round)
4. (Argentina) Máximo González / (Brazil) Fabrício Neis (first round)

== Draw ==
Key

- Q = Qualifier
- WC = Wild card
- LL = Lucky loser
- Alt = Alternate
- ITF = ITF entry
- PR = Protected ranking
- SR = Special ranking
- SE = Special exempt
- JE = Junior exempt
- JR = Junior Accelerator Programme entrant
- CO = College Accelerator Programme entrant
- NG = Next Gen Accelerator Program entrant
- w/o = Walkover
- r = Retired
- d = Defaulted

First round
1 | (Uruguay) A Behar (Belarus) A Bury | 5 | 2
WC | (Italy) F Cipolla (Italy) M Viola | 7 | 6
WC | (Italy) M Berrettini (United States) L Caruana | 4 | 4
(Argentina) G Andreozzi (Argentina) G Durán | 6 | 6
4 | (Argentina) M González (Brazil) F Neis | 3 | 4
PR | (Germany) G Kretschmer (Germany) A Satschko | 6 | 6
(Croatia) T Draganja (India) J Nedunchezhiyan | 6^{3} | 3
(South Africa) R Roelofse (Croatia) A Šančić | 7^{7} | 6
(Sweden) J Brunström (Croatia) M Draganja | 6^{5} | 6 | [10]
(Chinese Taipei) C-p Hsieh (Australia) R Junaid | 7^{7} | 3 | [8]
(El Salvador) M Arévalo (Brazil) J Souza | 6 | 3 | [10]
3 | (Germany) A Mies (United States) M Schnur | 3 | 6 | [3]
(United States) S Bangoura (Austria) T-S Weissborn | 6 | 6
WC | (Italy) G Mager (Italy) A Pellegrino | 2 | 4
(Italy) R Ghedin (Italy) A Motti | 7 | 3 | [10]
Alt | (Switzerland) L Margaroli (New Zealand) B McLachlan | 5 | 6 | [8]

Quarterfinals
WC | (Italy) F Cipolla (Italy) M Viola | 2 | 3
(Argentina) G Andreozzi (Argentina) G Durán | 6 | 6
PR | (Germany) G Kretschmer (Germany) A Satschko | 6^{4} | 6 | [10]
(South Africa) R Roelofse (Croatia) A Šančić | 7^{7} | 4 | [6]
(Sweden) J Brunström (Croatia) M Draganja | 4 | 4
(El Salvador) M Arévalo (Brazil) J Souza | 6 | 6
(United States) S Bangoura (Austria) T-S Weissborn | 6 | 6
(Italy) R Ghedin (Italy) A Motti | 2 | 1

Semifinals
(Argentina) G Andreozzi (Argentina) G Durán | 3 | 1
PR | (Germany) G Kretschmer (Germany) A Satschko | 6 | 6
(El Salvador) M Arévalo (Brazil) J Souza | 6^{4} | 6^{5}
(United States) S Bangoura (Austria) T-S Weissborn | 7^{7} | 7^{7}

Final
PR | (Germany) G Kretschmer (Germany) A Satschko | 6 | 7^{7}
(United States) S Bangoura (Austria) T-S Weissborn | 4 | 6^{4}
