= 2017 Internazionali di Tennis Città di Vicenza =

- Date: 29 May – 4 June
- Edition: 4th
- Draw: 32S / 16D
- Surface: Clay
- Location: Vicenza, Italy

Champions

Singles
- (Hungary) Márton Fucsovics

Doubles
- (Germany) Gero Kretschmer / (Germany) Alexander Satschko
- Internazionali di Tennis Città di Vicenza

The 2017 Internazionali di Tennis Città di Vicenza was a professional tennis tournament played on clay courts. It was the fourth edition of the tournament which was part of the 2017 ATP Challenger Tour. It took place in Vicenza, Italy between 29 May and 4 June 2017.

== Point distribution ==
| Event | W | F | SF | QF | Round of 16 | Round of 32 | Q | Q2 |
| Singles | 80 | 48 | 29 | 15 | 7 | 0 | 3 | 0 |
| Doubles | 80 | 48 | 29 | 15 | 0 | —N/a | —N/a | —N/a |

== Singles main-draw entrants ==
=== Seeds ===
| Country | Player | Rank^{1} | Seed |
|---|---|---|---|
| SVK | Andrej Martin | 106 | 1 |
| ITA | Alessandro Giannessi | 108 | 2 |
| AUT | Gerald Melzer | 111 | 3 |
| ARG | Guido Andreozzi | 123 | 4 |
| GER | Maximilian Marterer | 130 | 5 |
| ESP | Roberto Carballés Baena | 134 | 6 |
| SRB | Laslo Đere | 135 | 7 |
| BRA | João Souza | 140 | 8 |

- ^{1} Rankings are as of May 22, 2017.

=== Other entrants ===
The following players received wildcards into the singles main draw:

- (Italy) Matteo Berrettini
- (Italy) Matteo Donati
- (Serbia) Filip Krajinović
- (Italy) Gianluca Mager

The following players received entry into the singles main draw as special exempts:

- (Portugal) João Domingues
- (Australia) Blake Mott

The following player received entry into the singles main draw using a protected ranking:

- (Spain) Daniel Muñoz de la Nava

The following players received entry from the qualifying draw:

- (Argentina) Federico Coria
- (Italy) Edoardo Eremin
- (Slovenia) Blaž Rola
- (Germany) Cedrik-Marcel Stebe

== Champions ==
=== Singles ===
- (Hungary) Márton Fucsovics def. (Serbia) Laslo Đere 4–6, 7–6^{(9–7)}, 6–2.

=== Doubles ===
- (Germany) Gero Kretschmer / (Germany) Alexander Satschko def. (United States) Sekou Bangoura / (Austria) Tristan-Samuel Weissborn 6–4, 7–6^{(7–4)}.
