= Tseng Chun-hsin =

Taiwanese tennis player

Tseng Chun-hsin 曾俊欣
- Tseng at the 2026 Wimbledon Championships
- Country (sports): Chinese Taipei
- Residence: Taipei, Taiwan
- Born: 8 August 2001 (age 25) Taipei, Taiwan
- Height: 1.75 m (5 ft 9 in)
- Turned pro: 2019
- Plays: Right-handed (two-handed backhand)
- Coach: Benjamin Ebrahimzadeh
- Prize money: US $1,767,954

Singles
- Career record: 19–39
- Career titles: 0
- Highest ranking: No. 83 (8 August 2022)
- Current ranking: No. 225 (5 October 2026)

Grand Slam singles results
- Australian Open: 1R (2022, 2023)
- French Open: 1R (2022)
- Wimbledon: 1R (2022, 2025)
- US Open: 1R (2022, 2025)

Doubles
- Career record: 3–2
- Career titles: 0
- Highest ranking: No. 305 (8 August 2022)
- Last updated on: 15 October 2026.

Tseng Chun-hsin
- Traditional Chinese: 曾俊欣
- Simplified Chinese: 曾俊欣
Transcriptions
Standard Mandarin
- Hanyu Pinyin: Zēng Jùnxīn

Tseng Chun-hsin
Medal record

Men's Tennis

Representing Chinese Taipei

Summer Universiade
Gold medal – first place	2019 Naples	Men's singles
Bronze medal – third place	2019 Naples	Men's Team

Tseng Chun-hsin (Chinese: 曾俊欣; pinyin: Zēng Jùnxīn; born 8 August 2001), also known as Jason Tseng, is a Taiwanese professional tennis player. He has a career-high singles ranking of world No. 83 by the ATP, achieved on 8 August 2022. Tseng is currently the No. 2 Taiwanese player. He was also the ITF junior No. 1, reaching the ranking after winning the 2018 French Open boys' singles. He is also part of the Chinese Taipei Davis Cup team since 2018, with a win-loss record of 1–0.

== Early and personal life ==
Tseng began playing tennis at the age of five with his father, who worked at a night market in Taiwan. He first trained in an elementary school team located in Yonghe District, New Taipei City.

He is nicknamed "the Night Market Champion" (Chinese: 夜市球王) by the Taiwanese media as his parents used to sell tanghulu at the Lehua Night Market in New Taipei City in order to support his tennis career.

== Career ==
=== Pre-2019: Junior years ===
He continued his training at the Mouratoglou Tennis Academy in France from age 13 to 17. During that period, he won singles title at the Petits As in 2015.

In 2018, He won his first ITF Futures event in Vietnam. He won the boys' singles title at the French Open and claimed the Wimbledon boys' singles title in the following month.

=== 2019: ATP and Masters debut ===
He made his ATP debut at the 2019 Miami Open as a wildcard.

In the 2019 Summer Universiade, Tseng won the gold medal in men's singles.

=== 2021–2022: Challenger breakthrough, Grand Slam & top 100 debuts ===
In December 2021, Tseng won his first ATP Challenger title in Maia, Portugal. He made his debut in the top 200 at world No. 188 on 20 December 2021.

He made his Grand Slam debut at the 2022 Australian Open where he received a wildcard.

The following month in February 2022, Tseng won his second ATP Challenger title in Bangalore, India. In April 2022, Tseng won his third ATP Challenger title in Murcia, Spain. He reached a career-high ranking of world No. 110 on 16 May 2022.

He qualified for his second Grand Slam tournament at the 2022 French Open to make his debut at this major. He lost in the first round in five sets in a match that lasted 4 hours 23 minutes against João Sousa. As a result of reaching the semifinals in Bratislava, Tseng made his debut in the top 100, at No. 97 on 13 June 2022.

He participated in the 2022 Next Generation ATP Finals as the sixth seed.

=== 2023–2025: First Masters win and ATP 500 quarterfinal, back to top 100 ===
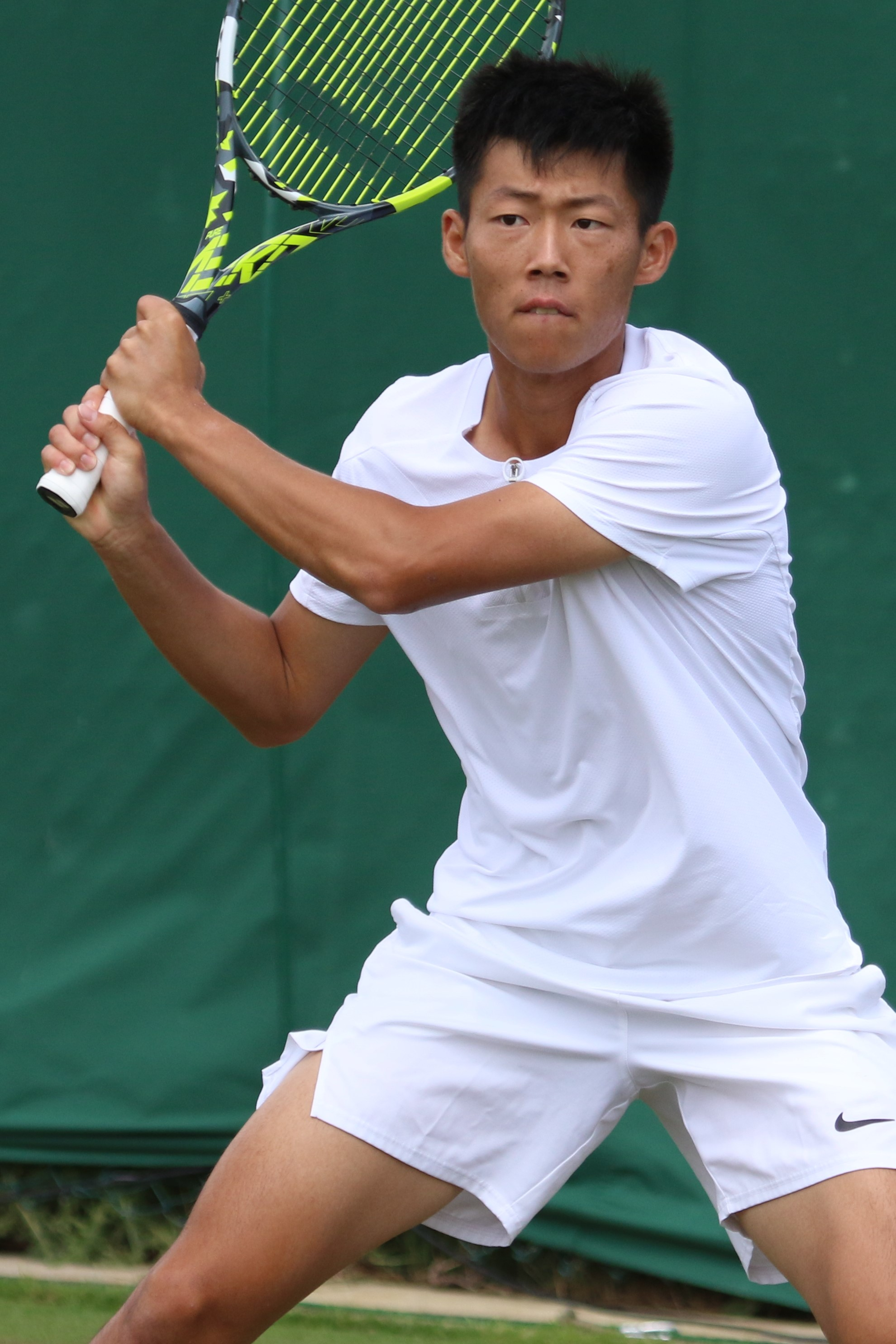
Tseng at the 2023 Wimbledon Championships

Ranked No. 380, he made his debut in qualifying at the Masters 1000, the 2023 Rolex Shanghai Masters. He qualified for the main draw and defeated Alexander Shevchenko on his debut at this tournament, recording his first Masters win. As a result, he moved close to 80 positions back up, one position shy of the top 300 on 16 October 2023.

In March 2024, he won his fourth Challenger at the Kiskút Open in Szekesfehevar, Hungary and returned to the top 250 on 18 March 2024.

Following his fifth Challenger title at the 2024 Internazionali di Tennis Città di Vicenza in June, and a final showing at the 2024 UniCredit Czech Open in Prostejov, he moved again 80 positions back up and returned to the top 175 on 10 June 2024.

Ranked No. 159, he entered the second round of the main draw at the 2024 Croatia Open as a lucky loser replacing third seed Holger Rune and defeated Fabio Fognini to reach his first ATP Tour quarterfinal. Three weeks later he reached the final at the 2024 San Marino Open, losing to Alexandre Müller in a deciding set tiebreak. As a result, two weeks later, he returned to the top 115 on 19 August 2024.

Following a second ATP career quarterfinal showing at the ATP 500 2025 Rio Open where he qualified and defeated third seed Alejandro Tabilo, his biggest and first top-50 win, and local wildcard and favorite Thiago Monteiro, Tseng returned to the top 100 in the rankings on 24 February 2025. Tseng was only the second player representing Chinese Taipei to reach an ATP 500 quarterfinal, alongside Lu Yen-hsun.

== ATP Challenger and ITF Tour finals ==
=== Singles 18 (10–8) ===
Legend ATP Challenger Tour (6–7) ITF Futures/World Tennis Tour (4–1)	Finals by surface Hard (4–0) Clay (6–8)

Result	W–L	Date	Tournament	Tier	Surface	Opponent	Score
Win	1–0	May 2018	Vietnam F1, Thừa Thiên Huế	Futures	Hard	(Vietnam) Lý Hoàng Nam	6–3, 7–6^{(7–0)}
Win	2–0	Jun 2018	Portugal F9, Póvoa de Varzim	Futures	Hard	(Portugal) Nuno Borges	6–3, 6–4
Win	3–0	Jul 2018	Chinese Taipei F2, Taipei	Futures	Hard	(Chinese Taipei) Chen Ti	6–1, 6–7^{(5–7)}, 7–6^{(7–1)}
Loss	3–1	Jul 2019	Prague, Czech Republic	Challenger	Clay	(Spain) Mario Vilella Martínez	4–6, 2–6
Loss	3–2	Oct 2020	M25 Hamburg, Germany	World Tennis Tour	Clay	(Poland) Kacper Żuk	4–6, 6–7^{(4–7)}
Win	4–2	Aug 2021	M25 Pitești, Romania	World Tennis Tour	Clay	(Argentina) Hernán Casanova	6–3, 3–6, 6–0
Loss	4–3	Dec 2021	Maia, Portugal	Challenger	Clay (i)	(France) Geoffrey Blancaneaux	6–3, 3–6, 2–6
Win	5–3	Dec 2021	Maia, Portugal	Challenger	Clay (i)	(Portugal) Nuno Borges	5–7, 7–5, 6–2
Win	6–3	Feb 2022	Bengaluru, India	Challenger	Hard	(Croatia) Borna Gojo	6–4, 7–5
Loss	6–4	Mar 2022	Roseto degli Abruzzi, Italy	Challenger	Clay	(France) Manuel Guinard	1–6, 2–6
Win	7–4	Apr 2022	Murcia, Spain	Challenger	Clay	(Slovakia) Norbert Gombos	6–4, 6–1
Win	8–4	Mar 2024	Székesfehérvár, Hungary	Challenger	Clay	(France) Titouan Droguet	4–1 ret.
Win	9–4	May 2024	Vicenza, Italy	Challenger	Clay	(Argentina) Marco Trungelliti	6–3, 6–2
Loss	9–5	Jun 2024	Prostějov, Czech Republic	Challenger	Clay	(Switzerland) Jérôme Kym	2–6, 6–3, 2–6
Loss	9–6	Jul 2024	San Marino	Challenger	Clay	(France) Alexandre Muller	3–6, 6–4, 6–7^{(3-7)}
Win	10–6	May 2025	Vicenza, Italy	Challenger	Clay	(Austria) Lukas Neumayer	6–3, 6–4
Loss	10–7	Jun 2025	Prostějov, Czech Republic	Challenger	Clay	(Bolivia) Hugo Dellien	3–6, 4–6
Loss	10–8	Aug 2026	Prague, Czech Republic	Challenger	Clay	(Czech Republic) Jan Kumstát	7–5, 3–6, 0–6

=== Doubles (2–0) ===
Legend ATP Challenger Tour (1–0) Futures/ITF World Tennis Tour (1–0)	Finals by surface Hard (0–0) Clay (2–0)

Result	W–L	Date	Tournament	Tier	Surface	Partner	Opponents	Score
Win	1–0	Aug 2021	M25 Pitești, Romania	World Tennis Tour	Clay	(France) Valentin Royer	(France) Corentin Denolly (France) Clément Tabur	4–6, 6–2, [10–8]
Win	1–0	Apr 2024	Barletta, Italy	Challenger	Clay	(Czech Republic) Zdeněk Kolář	(France) Théo Arribagé (France) Benjamin Bonzi	1–6, 6–3, [10–7]

== Junior Grand Slam finals ==
=== Singles (2–1) ===
Result	Year	Tournament	Surface	Opponent	Score
Loss	2018	Australian Open	Hard	(United States) Sebastian Korda	6–7^{(6–8)}, 4–6
Win	2018	French Open	Clay	(Argentina) Sebastián Báez	7–6^{(7–5)}, 6–2
Win	2018	Wimbledon	Grass	(United Kingdom) Jack Draper	6–1, 6–7^{(2–7)}, 6–4

=== Doubles (0–1) ===
Result	Year	Tournament	Surface	Partner	Opponents	Score
Loss	2018	French Open	Clay	(Chinese Taipei) Ray Ho	(Czech Republic) Ondřej Štyler (Japan) Naoki Tajima	4–6, 4–6

== Performance timeline ==
Key
W	F	SF	QF	#R	RR	Q#	DNQ	A	NH

(W) winner; (F) finalist; (SF) semifinalist; (QF) quarterfinalist; (#R) rounds 4, 3, 2, 1; (RR) round-robin stage; (Q#) qualification round; (DNQ) did not qualify; (A) absent; (NH) not held; (SR) strike rate (events won / competed); (W–L) win–loss record.
To avoid confusion and double counting, these charts are updated at the conclusion of a tournament or when the player's participation has ended.

=== Singles ===
Tournament	2019	2020	2021	2022	2023	2024	2025	2026	SR	W–L	Win %
Grand Slam tournaments
Australian Open	A	A	A	1R	1R	A	Q2	Q1	0 / 2	0–2	0%
French Open	A	A	A	1R	Q2	A	Q1	Q1	0 / 1	0–1	0%
Wimbledon	Q1	NH	A	1R	Q1	A	1R	Q1	0 / 2	0–2	0%
US Open	A	A	A	1R	A	Q2	1R	A	0 / 2	0–2	0%
Win–loss	0–0	0–0	0–0	0–4	0–1	0–0	0–2	0–0	0 / 7	0–7	0%
ATP Tour Masters 1000
Indian Wells Masters	A	NH	A	Q1	A	A	Q1	1R	0 / 1	0–1	0%
Miami Open	1R	NH	A	A	A	A	2R	Q1	0 / 2	1–2	33%
Monte Carlo Masters	A	A	A	A	A	A	Q1	A	0 / 0	0–0	–
Madrid Open	A	NH	A	A	Q1	A	Q1	A	0 / 0	0–0	–
Italian Open	A	A	A	A	A	A	1R	A	0 / 1	0–1	0%
Canadian Open	A	A	A	A	A	A	1R	A	0 / 1	0–1	0%
Cincinnati Masters	A	A	A	A	Q2	A	A		0 / 0	0–0	–
Shanghai Masters	A	NH			2R	Q1	Q1		0 / 1	1–1	50%
Paris Masters	A	A	A	A	A	A	A		0 / 0	0–0	–
Win–loss	0–1	0–0	0–0	0–0	1–1	0–0	1–3	0–0	0 / 5	2–5	29%
Year-end ranking				115	298	119			$1,011,472		

Awards and achievements
Preceded by (Argentina) Axel Geller	ITF Junior World Champion; 2018	Succeeded by (Argentina) Thiago Agustín Tirante
