= 2025 Internazionali di Tennis Città di Vicenza =

- Date: 26 May – 1 June
- Edition: 10th
- Surface: Clay
- Location: Vicenza, Italy

Champions

Singles
- (Chinese Taipei) Tseng Chun-hsin

Doubles
- (Italy) Federico Bondioli / (Italy) Stefano Travaglia
← 2024 ·	Internazionali di Tennis Città di Vicenza	· 2026 →

The 2025 Internazionali di Tennis Città di Vicenza was a professional tennis tournament played on clay courts. It was the tenth edition of the tournament which was part of the 2025 ATP Challenger Tour. It took place in Vicenza, Italy between 26 May and 1 June 2025.

== Singles main-draw entrants ==
=== Seeds ===
Country	Player	Rank^{1}	Seed
TPE	Tseng Chun-hsin	93	1
SUI	Jérôme Kym	123	2
LUX	Chris Rodesch	172	3
PER	Ignacio Buse	177	4
CRO	Duje Ajduković	182	5
AUT	Lukas Neumayer	183	6
ITA	Federico Arnaboldi	186	7
DEN	August Holmgren	188	8

- ^{1} Rankings are as of 19 May 2025.

=== Other entrants ===
The following players received wildcards into the singles main draw:

- (Italy) Lorenzo Carboni
- (Italy) Luca Castagnola
- (Italy) Francesco Maestrelli

The following players received entry into the singles main draw as alternates:

- (Norway) Viktor Durasovic
- (France) Mathys Erhard
- (Spain) Oriol Roca Batalla
- (Jordan) Abdullah Shelbayh

The following players received entry from the qualifying draw:

- (Italy) Federico Bondioli
- (Peru) Gonzalo Bueno
- (Italy) Marco Cecchinato
- (Slovakia) Martin Kližan
- (Spain) Andrés Santamarta Roig
- (Austria) Joel Schwärzler

== Champions ==
=== Singles ===
- (Chinese Taipei) Tseng Chun-hsin def. (Austria) Lukas Neumayer 6–3, 6–4.

=== Doubles ===
- (Italy) Federico Bondioli / (Italy) Stefano Travaglia def. (Denmark) August Holmgren / (Denmark) Johannes Ingildsen 6–2, 6–1.
