= 2023 Internazionali di Tennis Città di Vicenza – Singles =

Singles
- 2023 Internazionali di Tennis Città di Vicenza

Final
- Champion: (Argentina) Francisco Comesaña
- Runner-up: (Spain) Pablo Llamas Ruiz
- Score: 3–6, 6–2, 6–2

Events
Singles	Doubles
- Internazionali di Tennis Città di Vicenza

Andrea Pellegrino was the defending champion but chose not to defend his title.

Francisco Comesaña won the title after defeating Pablo Llamas Ruiz 3–6, 6–2, 6–2 in the final.

== Seeds ==
1. (Italy) Francesco Passaro (semifinals)
2. (Italy) Luca Nardi (quarterfinals)
3. (Czech Republic) Vít Kopřiva (first round)
4. (Italy) Riccardo Bonadio (first round)
5. (Italy) Franco Agamenone (first round)
6. (Italy) Mattia Bellucci (second round)
7. (Belgium) Kimmer Coppejans (first round)
8. (Japan) Sho Shimabukuro (first round)

== Draw ==
Key

- Q = Qualifier
- WC = Wild card
- LL = Lucky loser
- Alt = Alternate
- ITF = ITF entry
- PR = Protected ranking
- SR = Special ranking
- SE = Special exempt
- JE = Junior exempt
- JR = Junior Accelerator Programme entrant
- CO = College Accelerator Programme entrant
- NG = Next Gen Accelerator Program entrant
- w/o = Walkover
- r = Retired
- d = Defaulted

=== Finals ===
Semifinals
1	(Italy) Francesco Passaro	6^{6}	3
Alt	(Argentina) Francisco Comesaña	7^{8}	6
Q	(Argentina) Román Andrés Burruchaga	3	0
(Spain) Pablo Llamas Ruiz	6	6

Final
Alt	(Argentina) Francisco Comesaña	3	6	6
(Spain) Pablo Llamas Ruiz	6	2	2

=== Top half ===
First round
1	(Italy) F Passaro	7	6
(Austria) M Neuchrist	5	3
(Romania) ND Ionel	6	6
Q	(Bosnia and Herzegovina) N Fatić	4	4
(Italy) M Gigante	6	1	1
(Argentina) S Rodríguez Taverna	1	6	6
E Donskoy	3	3
6	(Italy) M Bellucci	6	6
3	(Czech Republic) V Kopřiva	0	5
(Argentina) A Collarini	6	7
Alt	(Brazil) M Pucinelli de Almeida	6	7
(Italy) F Maestrelli	2	5
(Portugal) J Sousa	2	6^{4}
Q	(Ukraine) V Sachko	6	7^{7}
Alt	(Argentina) F Comesaña	6	7^{7}
7	(Belgium) K Coppejans	3	6^{4}

Second round
1	(Italy) F Passaro	6	1	7^{7}
(Romania) ND Ionel	3	6	6^{2}
(Argentina) S Rodríguez Taverna	6	7^{9}
6	(Italy) M Bellucci	3	6^{7}
(Argentina) A Collarini	3	5
Alt	(Brazil) M Pucinelli de Almeida	6	7
Q	(Ukraine) V Sachko	3	6	3
Alt	(Argentina) F Comesaña	6	2	6

Quarterfinals
1	(Italy) F Passaro	6	6
(Argentina) S Rodríguez Taverna	3	4
Alt	(Brazil) M Pucinelli de Almeida	2	2
Alt	(Argentina) F Comesaña	6	6

Semifinals
1	(Italy) F Passaro	6^{6}	3
Alt	(Argentina) F Comesaña	7^{8}	6

=== Bottom half ===
First round
5	(Italy) F Agamenone	6^{3}	2
Q	(Argentina) RA Burruchaga	7^{7}	6
Q	(Italy) F Gaio	3	4
(Argentina) M Navone	6	6
WC	(Italy) L Rottoli	3	1
(Argentina) M Trungelliti	6	6
Q	(Croatia) N Serdarušić	6	6
4	(Italy) R Bonadio	3	0
8	(Japan) S Shimabukuro	3	3
(Spain) P Llamas Ruiz	6	6
Q	(Italy) S Travaglia	6	6
WC	(Italy) G Piraino	0	3
(Czech Republic) D Svrčina	6	6
(Japan) R Noguchi	4	3
(Italy) L Darderi	6	1	3
2/WC	(Italy) L Nardi	1	6	6

Second round
Q	(Argentina) RA Burruchaga	6	6^{2}	7^{7}
(Argentina) M Navone	4	7^{7}	6^{1}
(Argentina) M Trungelliti	4	1^{r}
Q	(Croatia) N Serdarušić	6	3
(Spain) P Llamas Ruiz	4	6	6
Q	(Italy) S Travaglia	6	1	2
(Czech Republic) D Svrčina	6	6^{5}	2
2/WC	(Italy) L Nardi	3	7^{7}	6

Quarterfinals
Q	(Argentina) RA Burruchaga	6	6
Q	(Croatia) N Serdarušić	3	3
(Spain) P Llamas Ruiz	6	6
2/WC	(Italy) L Nardi	3	4

Semifinals
Q	(Argentina) RA Burruchaga	3	0
(Spain) P Llamas Ruiz	6	6
