= 2023 Internazionali di Tennis Città di Vicenza =

- Date: 29 May – 4 June
- Edition: 8th
- Surface: Clay
- Location: Vicenza, Italy

Champions

Singles
- (Argentina) Francisco Comesaña

Doubles
- (India) Anirudh Chandrasekar / (India) Vijay Sundar Prashanth
- Internazionali di Tennis Città di Vicenza

The 2023 Internazionali di Tennis Città di Vicenza was a professional tennis tournament played on clay courts. It was the eighth edition of the tournament which was part of the 2023 ATP Challenger Tour. It took place in Vicenza, Italy between 29 May and 4 June 2023.

== Singles main-draw entrants ==
=== Seeds ===
Country	Player	Rank^{1}	Seed
ITA	Francesco Passaro	128	1
ITA	Luca Nardi	151	2
CZE	Vít Kopřiva	162	3
ITA	Riccardo Bonadio	164	4
ITA	Franco Agamenone	166	5
ITA	Mattia Bellucci	167	6
BEL	Kimmer Coppejans	170	7
JPN	Sho Shimabukuro	178	8

- ^{1} Rankings are as of 22 May 2023.

=== Other entrants ===
The following players received wildcards into the singles main draw:

- (Italy) Luca Nardi
- (Italy) Gabriele Piraino
- (Italy) Lorenzo Rottoli

The following players received entry into the singles main draw as alternates:

- (Argentina) Francisco Comesaña
- (Brazil) Matheus Pucinelli de Almeida

The following players received entry from the qualifying draw:

- (Argentina) Román Andrés Burruchaga
- (Bosnia and Herzegovina) Nerman Fatić
- (Italy) Federico Gaio
- (Ukraine) Vitaliy Sachko
- (Croatia) Nino Serdarušić
- (Italy) Stefano Travaglia

== Champions ==
=== Singles ===
- (Argentina) Francisco Comesaña def. (Spain) Pablo Llamas Ruiz 3–6, 6–2, 6–2.

=== Doubles ===
- (India) Anirudh Chandrasekar / (India) Vijay Sundar Prashanth def. (Brazil) Fernando Romboli / (Brazil) Marcelo Zormann 6–3, 6–2.
