= 2019 Internazionali di Tennis Città di Vicenza =

- Date: 27 May – 2 June
- Edition: 6th
- Draw: 48S / 16D
- Surface: Clay
- Location: Vicenza, Italy

Champions

Singles
- (Italy) Alessandro Giannessi

Doubles
- (Portugal) Gonçalo Oliveira / (Belarus) Andrei Vasilevski
- Internazionali di Tennis Città di Vicenza

The 2019 Internazionali di Tennis Città di Vicenza was a professional tennis tournament played on clay courts. It was the sixth edition of the tournament which was part of the 2019 ATP Challenger Tour. It took place in Vicenza, Italy between 27 May and 2 June 2019.

== Singles main-draw entrants ==
=== Seeds ===
Country	Player	Rank^{1}	Seed
ITA	Paolo Lorenzi	101	1
POL	Kamil Majchrzak	118	2
POR	Pedro Sousa	125	3
ARG	Facundo Bagnis	126	4
ITA	Gianluca Mager	143	5
ESP	Adrián Menéndez Maceiras	150	6
ITA	Lorenzo Giustino	157	7
ITA	Filippo Baldi	163	8
ITA	Alessandro Giannessi	165	9
ESP	Enrique López Pérez	168	10
ARG	Carlos Berlocq	174	11
ITA	Stefano Napolitano	179	12
ITA	Roberto Marcora	183	13
AUS	Marc Polmans	190	14
ITA	Andrea Arnaboldi	195	15
CRO	Viktor Galović	198	16

- ^{1} Rankings are as of 20 May 2019.

=== Other entrants ===
The following players received wildcards into the singles main draw:

- (Italy) Francesco Forti
- (Italy) Luca Giacomini
- (Italy) Lorenzo Musetti
- (Italy) Julian Ocleppo
- (Italy) Giulio Zeppieri

The following players received entry into the singles main draw using their ITF World Tennis Ranking:

- (Spain) Javier Barranco Cosano
- (Italy) Riccardo Bonadio
- (Italy) Raúl Brancaccio
- ~~(Tunisia) Skander Mansouri~~
- (Spain) Oriol Roca Batalla

The following player received entry into the singles main draw as an alternate:

- (Italy) Marco Bortolotti

The following players received entry from the qualifying draw:

- (Germany) Benjamin Hassan
- (Italy) Andrea Vavassori

The following player received entry as a lucky loser:

- (Italy) Andrea Pellegrino

== Champions ==
=== Singles ===
- (Italy) Alessandro Giannessi def. (Italy) Filippo Baldi 7–5, 6–2.

=== Doubles ===
- (Portugal) Gonçalo Oliveira / (Belarus) Andrei Vasilevski def. (Brazil) Fabrício Neis / (Brazil) Fernando Romboli 6–3, 6–4.
