= Matteo Donati =

Italian tennis coach and former tennis player

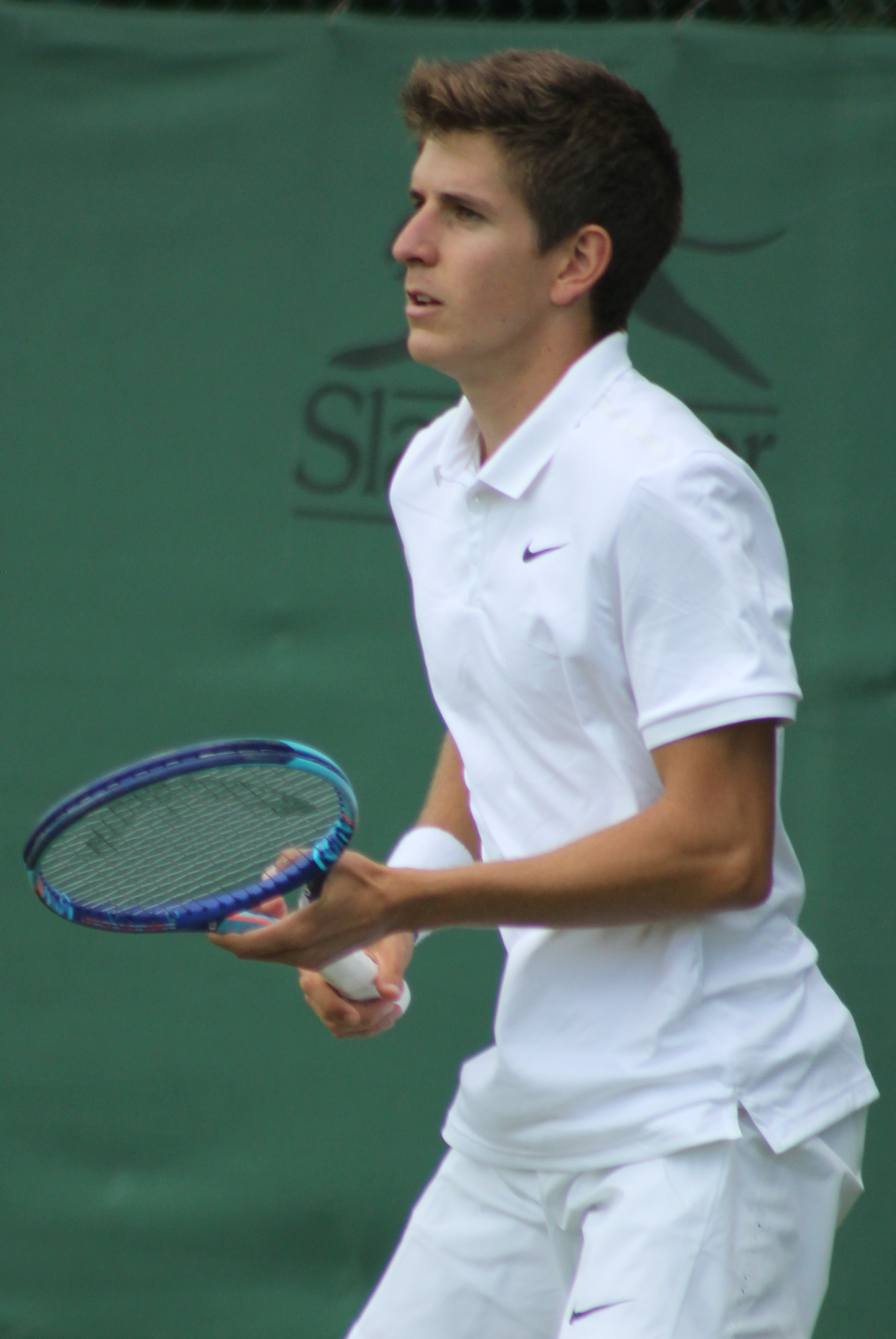
- Donati at the 2015 Wimbledon Championships
- Country (sports): Italy
- Residence: Alessandria, Italy
- Born: 28 February 1995 (age 30) Alessandria, Italy
- Height: 1.85 m (6 ft 1 in)
- Turned pro: 2013
- Retired: 27 October 2023 (last match played in March 2023)
- Plays: Right-handed (two-handed backhand)
- Prize money: $377,373

Singles
- Career record: 1–1
- Career titles: 0
- Highest ranking: No. 159 (27 July 2015)

Grand Slam singles results
- Australian Open: Q2 (2016)
- French Open: Q3 (2016, 2017)
- Wimbledon: Q3 (2015)
- US Open: Q1 (2015, 2018)

Doubles
- Career record: 1–1
- Career titles: 0
- Highest ranking: No. 231 (12 February 2018)

Coaching career (2024-)
- Yulia Putintseva (2024-)
- Last updated on: 10 May 2024.

Matteo Donati (Italian pronunciation: [matˈtɛːo doˈnaːti]; born 28 February 1995) is an Italian former professional tennis player and current tennis coach.

== Career ==
On 13 April 2015, he reached the final of the ATP Challenger, the Napoli Cup, and reached a career-high of No. 247 in the ATP World Tour singles rankings.

== Professional career ==
=== 2015 ===
Donati's first big professional result came in Naples at the 2015 Tennis Napoli Cup. As a wildcard, the Italian defeated Axel Michon in straight sets in the first round, World number 111 (former n. 33) and number 1 seed Andrey Golubev 6–7^{(3)}, 6–4, 6–2 in the following round, and fellow Italian Andrea Arnaboldi in a thriller three-setter in the quarterfinals. Donati then reached his first ATP Challenger Tour final (beating Marco Cecchinato 7–6^{(5)}, 6–2 in the semifinals) where he lost to Daniel Muñoz de la Nava in straight sets.

In May Donati obtained a wildcard into the main draw of the 2015 Internazionali BNL d'Italia, in Rome. Playing for the first time in a Master 1000 tournament (also his first ATP match), Donati fought back – from a set down – to beat World number 49 Santiago Giraldo 2–6, 6–1, 6–4.

== ATP Challenger and ITF Futures finals ==
=== Singles: 10 (5–5) ===
Legend ATP Challenger (0–4) ITF Futures (5–1)	Finals by surface Hard (0–0) Clay (5–5) Grass (0–0) Carpet (0–0)

Result	W–L	Date	Tournament	Tier	Surface	Opponent	Score
Win	1-0	Aug 2013	Finland F2, Kotka	Futures	Clay	(Finland) Micke Kontinen	7–5, 2–6, 6–1
Win	2-0	Aug 2013	Finland F3, Nastola	Futures	Clay	(Estonia) Vladimir Ivanov	6–1, 6–3
Win	3-0	Sep 2013	Italy F24, Trieste	Futures	Clay	(Italy) Pietro Rondoni	6–1, 6–2
Win	4-0	Oct 2013	Italy F28, Biella	Futures	Clay	(France) Grégoire Burquier	3–6, 7–6^{(7–3)}, 6–3
Win	5-0	Apr 2014	Italy F10, Pula	Futures	Clay	(France) Johan Sebastien Tatlot	6–4, 7–6^{(9–7)}
Loss	5-1	Jul 2014	Denmark F1, Aarhus	Futures	Clay	(Sweden) Christian Lindell	2–6, ret.
Loss	5-2	Apr 2015	Napoli, Italy	Challenger	Clay	(Spain) Daniel Muñoz de la Nava	2–6, 1–6
Loss	5-3	Jun 2016	Caltanissetta, Italy	Challenger	Clay	(Italy) Paolo Lorenzi	3–6, 6–4, 6–7^{(7–9)}
Loss	5-4	Jun 2018	Vicenza, Italy	Challenger	Clay	(Bolivia) Hugo Dellien	4–6, 7–5, 4–6
Loss	5-5	Jun 2018	Caltanissetta, Italy	Challenger	Clay	(Spain) Jaume Munar	2–6, 6–7^{(2–7)}

=== Doubles: 10 (7–3) ===
Legend ATP Challenger (5–1) ITF Futures (2–2)	Finals by surface Hard (1–1) Clay (6–2) Grass (0–0) Carpet (0–0)

Result	W–L	Date	Tournament	Tier	Surface	Partner	Opponents	Score
Loss	0–1	May 2012	Italy F7, Sanremo	Futures	Clay	(Italy) Viktor Galović	(Italy) Claudio Grassi (Latvia) Andis Juška	5–7, 7–6^{(7–2)}, [12–14]
Loss	0–2	Sep 2012	Turkey F37, Antalya	Futures	Hard	(Italy) Francesco Picco	(Australia) Brydan Klein (Australia) Dane Propoggia	1–6, 2–6
Win	1–2	Apr 2013	Italy F4, Padua	Futures	Clay	(Kazakhstan) Andrey Golubev	(Croatia) Mate Delić (Croatia) Joško Topić	7–6^{(8–6)}, 3–6, [10–6]
Win	2–2	Apr 2014	Vercelli, Italy	Challenger	Clay	(Italy) Stefano Napolitano	(France) Pierre-Hugues Herbert (France) Albano Olivetti	7–6^{(7–2)}, 6–3
Win	3–2	Jul 2014	Denmark F1, Aarhus	Futures	Clay	(Italy) Simone Vagnozzi	(Sweden) Christian Lindell (Sweden) Robin Olin	6–1, 6–0
Win	4–2	Jan 2016	Happy Valley, Australia	Challenger	Hard	(Kazakhstan) Andrey Golubev	(Ukraine) Denys Molchanov (Kazakhstan) Aleksandr Nedovyesov	3–6, 7–6^{(7–5)}, [10–1]
Loss	4–3	Apr 2016	Napoli, Italy	Challenger	Clay	(Italy) Stefano Napolitano	(Germany) Gero Kretschmer (Germany) Alexander Satschko	1–6, 3–6
Win	5–3	Apr 2017	Barletta, Italy	Challenger	Clay	(Italy) Marco Cecchinato	(Croatia) Marin Draganja (Croatia) Tomislav Draganja	6–3, 6–4
Win	6–3	Sep 2017	Sibiu, Romania	Challenger	Clay	(Italy) Marco Cecchinato	(Belgium) Sander Gillé (Belgium) Joran Vliegen	6–3, 6–1
Win	7–3	Jul 2018	Perugia, Italy	Challenger	Clay	(Italy) Daniele Bracciali	(Bosnia and Herzegovina) Tomislav Brkić (Croatia) Ante Pavić	6–3, 3–6, [10–7]

== Junior Grand Slam finals ==
=== Doubles: 1 (1 runner-up) ===
Result	Year	Tournament	Surface	Partner	Opponents	Score
Loss	2012	Wimbledon	Grass	(Italy) Pietro Licciardi	(Australia) Nick Kyrgios (Australia) Andrew Harris	2–6, 4–6

== Performance timeline ==
Key
W	F	SF	QF	#R	RR	Q#	DNQ	A	NH

(W) winner; (F) finalist; (SF) semifinalist; (QF) quarterfinalist; (#R) rounds 4, 3, 2, 1; (RR) round-robin stage; (Q#) qualification round; (DNQ) did not qualify; (A) absent; (NH) not held; (SR) strike rate (events won / competed); (W–L) win–loss record.
To avoid confusion and double counting, these charts are updated at the conclusion of a tournament or when the player's participation has ended.

=== Singles ===
Tournament	2014	2015	2016	2017	2018	2019	SR	W–L	Win%
Grand Slam tournaments
Australian Open	A	A	Q2	Q1	A	Q1	0 / 0	0–0	–
French Open	A	A	Q3	Q3	A	Q1	0 / 0	0–0	–
Wimbledon	A	Q3	A	Q1	Q1	A	0 / 0	0–0	–
US Open	A	Q1	A	A	Q1	A	0 / 0	0–0	–
Win–loss	0–0	0–0	0–0	0–0	0–0	0–0	0 / 0	0–0	–
ATP Tour Masters 1000
Rome	Q1	2R	Q2	A	A	A	0 / 1	1–1	50%
Shanghai	A	Q1	A	A	A	A	0 / 0	0–0	–
Win–loss	0–0	1–1	0–0	0–0	0–0	0–0	0 / 1	1–1	50%
