= Internazionali di Tennis Città di Vicenza =

Internazionali di Tennis - Città di Vicenza

ATP Challenger Tour
- Event name: Internazionali di Tennis - Città di Vicenza; Trofeo FL Service Brokerage and Logistics
- Location: Vicenza, Italy
- Venue: Circolo Tennis Palladio 98
- Category: ATP Challenger Tour
- Surface: Clay
- Draw: 32S/26Q/16D
- Prize money: €91,250 (2025), 74,825
- Website: Website

Current champions (2025)
- Singles: (Chinese Taipei) Tseng Chun-hsin
- Doubles: (Italy) Federico Bondioli/ (Italy) Stefano Travaglia

The Internazionali di Tennis - Città di Vicenza is a tennis tournament held in Vicenza, Italy since 2014. The event is part of the ATP Challenger Tour and is played on outdoor clay courts.

Tseng Chun-hsin is the singles record holder with two consecutive titles won.

== Past finals ==
=== Singles ===
Year	Champion	Runner-up	Score
2014	(Serbia) Filip Krajinović	(Slovakia) Norbert Gomboš	6–4, 6–4
2015	(Spain) Íñigo Cervantes	(Australia) John Millman	6–4, 6–2
2016	(Argentina) Guido Andreozzi	(Spain) Pere Riba	6–0, 0–0 ret.
2017	(Hungary) Márton Fucsovics	(Serbia) Laslo Đere	4–6, 7–6^{(9–7)}, 6–2
2018	(Bolivia) Hugo Dellien	(Italy) Matteo Donati	6–4, 5–7, 6–4
2019	(Italy) Alessandro Giannessi	(Italy) Filippo Baldi	7–5, 6–2
2020- 2021	Not held		
2022	(Italy) Andrea Pellegrino	(Argentina) Andrea Collarini	6–1, 6–4
2023	(Argentina) Francisco Comesaña	(Spain) Pablo Llamas Ruiz	3–6, 6–2, 6–2
2024	(Chinese Taipei) Tseng Chun-hsin	(Argentina) Marco Trungelliti	6–3, 6–2
2025	(Chinese Taipei) Tseng Chun-hsin	(Austria) Lukas Neumayer	6–3, 6–4
2026	(Austria) Lukas Neumayer	(Italy) Jacopo Vasamì	6–2, 6–2

=== Doubles ===
Year	Champions	Runners-up	Score
2014	(Slovakia) Andrej Martin (Slovakia) Igor Zelenay	(Poland) Błażej Koniusz (Poland) Mateusz Kowalczyk	6–1, 7–5
2015	(Argentina) Facundo Bagnis (Argentina) Guido Pella	(Italy) Salvatore Caruso (Italy) Federico Gaio	6–2, 6–4
2016	(Kazakhstan) Andrey Golubev (Croatia) Nikola Mektić	(Portugal) Gastão Elias (Brazil) Fabrício Neis	6–3, 6–3
2017	(Germany) Gero Kretschmer (Germany) Alexander Satschko	(United States) Sekou Bangoura (Austria) Tristan-Samuel Weissborn	6–4, 7–6^{(7–4)}
2018	(Uruguay) Ariel Behar (Spain) Enrique López Pérez	(Argentina) Facundo Bagnis (Brazil) Fabrício Neis	6–2, 6–4
2019	(Portugal) Gonçalo Oliveira (Belarus) Andrei Vasilevski	(Brazil) Fabrício Neis (Brazil) Fernando Romboli	6–3, 6–4
2020- 2021	Not held		
2022	(Argentina) Francisco Comesaña (Italy) Luciano Darderi	(Italy) Matteo Gigante (Italy) Francesco Passaro	6–3, 7–6^{(7–4)}
2023	(India) Anirudh Chandrasekar (India) Vijay Sundar Prashanth	(Brazil) Fernando Romboli (Brazil) Marcelo Zormann	6–3, 6–2
2024	(Ukraine) Vladyslav Manafov (Finland) Patrik Niklas-Salminen	(Germany) Andre Begemann (India) Niki Kaliyanda Poonacha	6–3, 6–4
2025	(Italy) Federico Bondioli (Italy) Stefano Travaglia	(Denmark) August Holmgren (Denmark) Johannes Ingildsen	6–2, 6–1
2026	(Sweden) Erik Grevelius (Sweden) Adam Heinonen	(Switzerland) Rémy Bertola (Italy) Francesco Forti	7–6^{(7–1)}, 7–6^{(7–5)}
