= 2017 Internazionali di Tennis Castel del Monte – Singles =

Singles
- 2017 Internazionali di Tennis Castel del Monte

Final
- Champion: (Belarus) Uladzimir Ignatik
- Runner-up: (Belgium) Christopher Heyman
- Score: 6–7^{(3–7)}, 6–4, 7–6^{(7–3)}

Events
Singles	Doubles
← 2016 ·	Internazionali di Tennis Castel del Monte	· 2018 →

Luca Vanni was the defending champion but chose not to defend his title.

Uladzimir Ignatik won the title after defeating Christopher Heyman 6–7^{(3–7)}, 6–4, 7–6^{(7–3)} in the final.

== Seeds ==
1. (Italy) Stefano Travaglia (first round)
2. (Lithuania) Ričardas Berankis (second round)
3. (Bosnia and Herzegovina) Mirza Bašić (semifinals)
4. (Bosnia and Herzegovina) Aldin Šetkić (second round)
5. (Belarus) Uladzimir Ignatik (champion)
6. (Croatia) Viktor Galović (quarterfinals)
7. (Italy) Lorenzo Sonego (second round)
8. (Czech Republic) Zdeněk Kolář (quarterfinals)

== Draw ==
=== Key ===
- Q = Qualifier
- WC = Wild card
- LL = Lucky loser
- Alt = Alternate
- SE = Special exempt
- PR = Protected ranking
- ITF = ITF entry
- JE = Junior exempt
- w/o = Walkover
- r = Retired
- d = Defaulted
- SR = Special ranking

=== Finals ===
Semifinals
5	(Belarus) Uladzimir Ignatik	6^{7}	7^{7}	7^{8}
WC	(Italy) Filippo Baldi	7^{9}	6^{5}	6^{6}
3	(Bosnia and Herzegovina) Mirza Bašić	3	7	5
Q	(Belgium) Christopher Heyman	6	5	7

Final
5	(Belarus) Uladzimir Ignatik	6^{3}	6	7^{7}
Q	(Belgium) Christopher Heyman	7^{7}	4	6^{3}

=== Top half ===
First round
1	(Italy) S Travaglia	6	4	6^{4}
(Italy) A Basso	3	6	7^{7}
(Croatia) F Škugor	6	7^{9}
(Lithuania) L Grigelis	3	6^{7}
(France) A Olivetti	7^{7}	3	6
(Italy) M Viola	6^{3}	6	2
(Italy) Alessandro Petrone	4	2
5	(Belarus) U Ignatik	6	6
4	(Bosnia and Herzegovina) A Šetkić	6	6
LL	(Russia) D Matsukevich	4	3
WC	(Italy) A Pellegrino	6	6
(Germany) R Kern	4	4
(Czech Republic) Marek Jaloviec	3	4
WC	(Italy) F Baldi	6	6
Q	(Italy) A Vavassori	5	2
7	(Italy) L Sonego	7	6

Second round
(Italy) A Basso	6^{9}	6	3
(Croatia) F Škugor	7^{11}	3	6
(France) A Olivetti	6^{5}	2
5	(Belarus) U Ignatik	7^{7}	6
4	(Bosnia and Herzegovina) A Šetkić	4	6^{6}
WC	(Italy) A Pellegrino	6	7^{8}
WC	(Italy) F Baldi	6	6
7	(Italy) L Sonego	4	4

Quarterfinals
(Croatia) F Škugor	4	4
5	(Belarus) U Ignatik	6	6
WC	(Italy) A Pellegrino	4	3
WC	(Italy) F Baldi	6	6

Semifinals
5	(Belarus) U Ignatik	6^{7}	7^{7}	7^{8}
WC	(Italy) F Baldi	7^{9}	6^{5}	6^{6}

=== Bottom half ===
First round
6	(Croatia) V Galović	7^{7}	6
WC	(Italy) E Dalla Valle	6^{3}	4
Q	(Italy) Gianluca Di Nicola	6	5	6
(Russia) I Gakhov	4	7	4
(Italy) M Donati	6^{5}	1
(Russia) E Karlovskiy	7^{7}	6
(Slovakia) F Horanský	1	3
3	(Bosnia and Herzegovina) M Bašić	6	6
8	(Czech Republic) Z Kolář	6	6^{5}	6
(Italy) Lorenzo Frigerio	4	7^{7}	3
Q	(France) C Lestienne	4	6	4
PR	(Netherlands) I Sijsling	6	2	6
Q	(Belgium) Christopher Heyman	7^{7}	6
(Italy) A Arnaboldi	6^{2}	4
(Italy) A Bega	1	6^{3}
2	(Lithuania) R Berankis	6	7^{7}

Second round
6	(Croatia) V Galović	6	7^{7}
Q	(Italy) G Di Nicola	4	6^{4}
(Russia) E Karlovskiy	6^{5}	4
3	(Bosnia and Herzegovina) M Bašić	7^{7}	6
8	(Czech Republic) Z Kolář	6	6
PR	(Netherlands) I Sijsling	3	3
Q	(Belgium) C Heyman	6	6
2	(Lithuania) R Berankis	3	3

Quarterfinals
6	(Croatia) V Galović	4	4
3	(Bosnia and Herzegovina) M Bašić	6	6
8	(Czech Republic) Z Kolář	5	6^{5}
Q	(Belgium) C Heyman	7	7^{7}

Semifinals
3	(Bosnia and Herzegovina) M Bašić	3	7	5
Q	(Belgium) C Heyman	6	5	7
