= 2014 Internazionali di Tennis Castel del Monte – Doubles =

Doubles
- 2014 Internazionali di Tennis Castel del Monte

Final
- Champion: (Romania) Patrick Grigoriu (Romania) Costin Pavăl
- Runner-up: (Czech Republic) Roman Jebavý (Sweden) Andreas Siljeström
- Score: 7–6^{(7–4)}, 6–7^{(4–7)}, [10–5]

Events
Singles	Doubles
← 2013 ·	Internazionali di Tennis Castel del Monte	· 2015 →

Philipp Oswald and Andreas Siljeström were the defending champions, but Oswald did not participate that year, and Siljeström played alongside Roman Jebavý, but they lost in the final to Patrick Grigoriu and Costin Pavăl, 6–7^{(4–7)}, 7–6^{(7–4)}, [5–10].

== Seeds ==
1. (Germany) Frank Moser / (Germany) Alexander Satschko (first round)
2. (Czech Republic) Roman Jebavý / (Sweden) Andreas Siljeström (final)
3. (Australia) Rameez Junaid / (Netherlands) Wesley Koolhof (first round)
4. (United States) James Cerretani / (Republic of Ireland) James Cluskey (first round)

== Draw ==
=== Key ===
- Q = Qualifier
- WC = Wild card
- LL = Lucky loser
- Alt = Alternate
- SE = Special exempt
- PR = Protected ranking
- ITF = ITF entry
- JE = Junior exempt
- w/o = Walkover
- r = Retired
- d = Defaulted
- SR = Special ranking

=== Draw ===
First round
1	(Germany) F Moser (Germany) A Satschko	6	5	[9]
(Italy) Francesco Borgo (Spain) E López-Pérez	4	7	[11]
WC	(Italy) F Baldi (Italy) S Travaglia	7^{9}	7^{11}
(Georgia (country)) N Basilashvili (Czech Republic) J Mertl	6^{7}	6^{9}
3	(Australia) R Junaid (Netherlands) W Koolhof	3	4
WC	(Romania) P Grigoriu (Romania) C Pavăl	6	6
Alt	(Bosnia and Herzegovina) M Bašić (Bosnia and Herzegovina) T Brkić	7^{9}	4	[11]
(Ukraine) S Bubka (Russia) K Kravchuk	6^{7}	6	[9]
WC	(Italy) W Trusendi (Italy) Matteo Volante	6	6
(Croatia) N Mektić (United Kingdom) D Walsh	0	4
(Italy) R Ghedin (Italy) C Grassi	7	7
4	(United States) J Cerretani (Republic of Ireland) J Cluskey	5	5
(Poland) A Kapaś (Poland) B Koniusz	3	1
(Italy) A Arnaboldi (Italy) M Viola	6	6
(Bosnia and Herzegovina) D Džumhur (Bosnia and Herzegovina) A Šetkić	6^{1}	6	[7]
2	(Czech Republic) R Jebavý (Sweden) A Siljeström	7^{7}	3	[10]

Quarterfinals
(Italy) F Borgo (Spain) E López-Pérez	1	7	[9]
WC	(Italy) F Baldi (Italy) S Travaglia	6	5	[11]
WC	(Romania) P Grigoriu (Romania) C Pavăl	7^{7}	6
Alt	(Bosnia and Herzegovina) M Bašić (Bosnia and Herzegovina) T Brkić	6^{2}	4
WC	(Italy) W Trusendi (Italy) M Volante	6	4	[10]
(Italy) R Ghedin (Italy) C Grassi	4	6	[3]
(Italy) A Arnaboldi (Italy) M Viola	4	6	[5]
2	(Czech Republic) R Jebavý (Sweden) A Siljeström	6	4	[10]

Semifinals
WC	(Italy) F Baldi (Italy) S Travaglia	3	6^{4}
WC	(Romania) P Grigoriu (Romania) C Pavăl	6	7^{7}
WC	(Italy) W Trusendi (Italy) M Volante	3	5
2	(Czech Republic) R Jebavý (Sweden) A Siljeström	6	7

Final
WC	(Romania) P Grigoriu (Romania) C Pavăl	7^{7}	6^{4}	[10]
2	(Czech Republic) R Jebavý (Sweden) A Siljeström	6^{4}	7^{7}	[5]
