= 2017 Internazionali di Tennis Castel del Monte – Doubles =

Doubles
- 2017 Internazionali di Tennis Castel del Monte

Final
- Champions: (Italy) Lorenzo Sonego (Italy) Andrea Vavassori
- Runners-up: (Netherlands) Sander Arends (Belgium) Sander Gillé
- Score: 6–3, 3–6, [10–7]

Events
Singles	Doubles
← 2016 ·	Internazionali di Tennis Castel del Monte	· 2018 →

Wesley Koolhof and Matwé Middelkoop were the defending champions but chose not to defend their title.

Lorenzo Sonego and Andrea Vavassori won the title after defeating Sander Arends and Sander Gillé 6–3, 3–6, [10–7] in the final.

== Seeds ==
1. (Netherlands) Sander Arends / (Belgium) Sander Gillé (final)
2. (Poland) Tomasz Bednarek / (Netherlands) David Pel (semifinals)
3. (Belarus) Aliaksandr Bury / (Ukraine) Volodymyr Uzhylovskyi (first round)
4. (Russia) Ivan Gakhov / (Spain) David Vega Hernández (first round)

== Draw ==
=== Key ===
- Q = Qualifier
- WC = Wild card
- LL = Lucky loser
- Alt = Alternate
- SE = Special exempt
- PR = Protected ranking
- ITF = ITF entry
- JE = Junior exempt
- w/o = Walkover
- r = Retired
- d = Defaulted
- SR = Special ranking

First round
1	(Netherlands) S Arends (Belgium) S Gillé	6	6
WC	(Italy) Gianluca Di Nicola (Italy) G Ricca	4	2
(Lithuania) L Grigelis (Czech Republic) Z Kolář	6	6
WC	(Italy) E Dalla Valle (Netherlands) M Vervoort	4	4
3	(Belarus) A Bury (Ukraine) V Uzhylovskyi	4	5
(Italy) F Baldi (Italy) A Pellegrino	6	7
(Italy) A Motti (Italy) S Travaglia	6	6^{3}	[10]
Alt	(Italy) A Bega (Italy) Lorenzo Frigerio	2	7^{7}	[7]
(Italy) L Sonego (Italy) A Vavassori	6	6
(Bosnia and Herzegovina) M Bašić (Bosnia and Herzegovina) A Šetkić	1	2
(Belgium) Christopher Heyman (Slovakia) F Horanský	6	6
4	(Russia) I Gakhov (Spain) D Vega Hernández	4	3
(Hungary) G Borsos (France) C Lestienne	7^{7}	4	[12]
(Russia) E Karlovskiy (Russia) D Matsukevich	6^{4}	6	[10]
(Italy) R Ghedin (Italy) W Trusendi	4	4
2	(Poland) T Bednarek (Netherlands) D Pel	6	6

Quarterfinals
1	(Netherlands) S Arends (Belgium) S Gillé	6	6
(Lithuania) L Grigelis (Czech Republic) Z Kolář	4	4
(Italy) F Baldi (Italy) A Pellegrino	2	6	[11]
(Italy) A Motti (Italy) S Travaglia	6	2	[9]
(Italy) L Sonego (Italy) A Vavassori	7	6
(Belgium) C Heyman (Slovakia) F Horanský	5	3
(Hungary) G Borsos (France) C Lestienne	1	1
2	(Poland) T Bednarek (Netherlands) D Pel	6	6

Semifinals
1	(Netherlands) S Arends (Belgium) S Gillé	6	6^{10}	[10]
(Italy) F Baldi (Italy) A Pellegrino	4	7^{12}	[6]
(Italy) L Sonego (Italy) A Vavassori	6	7^{7}
2	(Poland) T Bednarek (Netherlands) D Pel	2	6^{3}

Final
1	(Netherlands) S Arends (Belgium) S Gillé	3	6	[7]
(Italy) L Sonego (Italy) A Vavassori	6	3	[10]
