= 2016 Internazionali di Tennis Castel del Monte – Doubles =

Doubles
- 2016 Internazionali di Tennis Castel del Monte

Final
- Champions: (Netherlands) Wesley Koolhof (Netherlands) Matwé Middelkoop
- Runners-up: (Czech Republic) Roman Jebavý (Czech Republic) Zdeněk Kolář
- Score: 6–3, 6–3

Events
Singles	Doubles
← 2015 ·	Internazionali di Tennis Castel del Monte	· 2017 →

Marco Chiudinelli and Frank Moser were the defending champions but chose not to defend their title.

Wesley Koolhof and Matwé Middelkoop won the title after defeating Roman Jebavý and Zdeněk Kolář 6–3, 6–3 in the final.

== Seeds ==
1. (Netherlands) Wesley Koolhof / (Netherlands) Matwé Middelkoop (champions)
2. (Croatia) Nikola Mektić / (United Kingdom) Neal Skupski (quarterfinals)
3. (Netherlands) Sander Arends / (Australia) Rameez Junaid (quarterfinals)
4. (India) Ramkumar Ramanathan / (Belgium) Joran Vliegen (first round)

== Draw ==
=== Key ===
- Q = Qualifier
- WC = Wild card
- LL = Lucky loser
- Alt = Alternate
- SE = Special exempt
- PR = Protected ranking
- ITF = ITF entry
- JE = Junior exempt
- w/o = Walkover
- r = Retired
- d = Defaulted
- SR = Special ranking

First round
1	(Netherlands) W Koolhof (Netherlands) M Middelkoop	6	6
WC	(Italy) S Travaglia (Italy) Giuseppe Tresca	4	4
(Croatia) T Draganja (Serbia) Ilija Vučić	7^{7}	6
WC	(Romania) P Grigoriu (Romania) P-A Luncanu	6^{5}	4
3	(Netherlands) S Arends (Australia) R Junaid	3	6	[10]
WC	(Italy) A Pellegrino (Italy) A Vavassori	6	3	[5]
(France) Y Jankovits (Switzerland) L Margaroli	4	6	[11]
(Italy) A Motti (Austria) M Neuchrist	6	3	[9]
(Italy) R Ghedin (Greece) S Tsitsipas	6	3	[10]
(Germany) A Mies (Netherlands) D Pel	4	6	[7]
(Czech Republic) R Jebavý (Czech Republic) Z Kolář	6	3	[10]
4	(India) R Ramanathan (Belgium) J Vliegen	3	6	[8]
(Serbia) D Petrović (Bosnia and Herzegovina) A Šetkić	6	3	[8]
(Poland) T Bednarek (Japan) A Santillan	4	6	[10]
(Spain) A Menéndez-Maceiras (Spain) P Riba	4	3
2	(Croatia) N Mektić (United Kingdom) N Skupski	6	6

Quarterfinals
1	(Netherlands) W Koolhof (Netherlands) M Middelkoop	6	6
(Croatia) T Draganja (Serbia) I Vučić	4	4
3	(Netherlands) S Arends (Australia) R Junaid	6	3	[6]
(France) Y Jankovits (Switzerland) L Margaroli	3	6	[10]
(Italy) R Ghedin (Greece) S Tsitsipas	6	6^{4}	[6]
(Czech Republic) R Jebavý (Czech Republic) Z Kolář	3	7^{7}	[10]
(Poland) T Bednarek (Japan) A Santillan	7^{7}	3	[10]
2	(Croatia) N Mektić (United Kingdom) N Skupski	6^{4}	6	[8]

Semifinals
1	(Netherlands) W Koolhof (Netherlands) M Middelkoop	7	6
(France) Y Jankovits (Switzerland) L Margaroli	5	2
(Czech Republic) R Jebavý (Czech Republic) Z Kolář	6	6
(Poland) T Bednarek (Japan) A Santillan	4	4

Final
1	(Netherlands) W Koolhof (Netherlands) M Middelkoop	6	6
(Czech Republic) R Jebavý (Czech Republic) Z Kolář	3	3
