= 2014 Internazionali di Tennis Castel del Monte =

- Date: 15 November – 23 November
- Edition: 2nd
- Surface: Carpet / Indoor
- Location: Andria, Italy

Champions

Singles
- (Lithuania) Ričardas Berankis

Doubles
- (Romania) Patrick Grigoriu / (Romania) Costin Pavăl
← 2013 ·	Internazionali di Tennis Castel del Monte	· 2015 →

The 2014 Internazionali di Tennis Castel del Monte was a professional tennis tournament played on indoor carpet courts. It was the second edition of the tournament which is part of the 2014 ATP Challenger Tour. It took place in Andria, Italy between November 15 and November 23, 2014.

== Singles main-draw entrants ==
=== Seeds ===
Country	Player	Rank^{1}	Seed
NED	Igor Sijsling	85	1
~~GER~~	~~Dustin Brown~~	~~87~~	~~2~~
LTU	Ričardas Berankis	95	3
SLO	Blaž Kavčič	98	4
TUR	Marsel İlhan	100	5
BIH	Damir Džumhur	110	6
~~ISR~~	~~Dudi Sela~~	~~111~~	~~7~~
TPE	Jimmy Wang	121	8
~~UZB~~	~~Farrukh Dustov~~	~~128~~	~~9~~

- ^{1} Rankings are as of November 10, 2014.

=== Other entrants ===
The following players received wildcards into the singles main draw:

- (Italy) Filippo Baldi
- (Italy) Matteo Berrettini
- (Italy) Matteo Donati
- (Italy) Pietro Licciardi

The following players received entry from the qualifying draw:

- (Bosnia and Herzegovina) Mirza Bašić
- (Italy) Alessandro Bega
- (Austria) Nicolas Reissig
- (Russia) Anton Zaitcev

The following players received entry by a lucky loser spot:

- (Poland) Andriej Kapaś
- (Germany) Yannick Maden
- (Croatia) Nikola Mektić

The following player received entry by an alternate spot:

- (Russia) Konstantin Kravchuk

The following player received entry by a protected ranking:

- (Ukraine) Sergei Bubka

== Champions ==
=== Singles ===
- (Lithuania) Ričardas Berankis def. (Georgia (country)) Nikoloz Basilashvili, 6–4, 1–0, ret.

=== Doubles ===
- (Romania) Patrick Grigoriu / (Romania) Costin Pavăl def. (Czech Republic) Roman Jebavý / (Sweden) Andreas Siljeström, 7–6^{(7–4)}, 6–7^{(4–7)}, [10–5]
