= 2013 Internazionali di Tennis Castel del Monte =

- Date: 18–24 November
- Edition: 1st
- Surface: Hard
- Location: Andria, Italy

Champions

Singles
- (Hungary) Márton Fucsovics

Doubles
- (Austria) Philipp Oswald / (Sweden) Andreas Siljeström
Internazionali di Tennis Castel del Monte	· 2014 →

The 2013 Internazionali di Tennis Castel del Monte was a professional tennis tournament played on hard courts. It was the first edition of the tournament which was part of the 2013 ATP Challenger Tour. It took place in Andria, Italy between 18 and 24 November 2013.

== Singles main-draw entrants ==
=== Seeds ===
Country	Player	Rank^{1}	Seed
ITA	Paolo Lorenzi	100	1
AUT	Andreas Haider-Maurer	112	2
GER	Dustin Brown	120	3
CAN	Frank Dancevic	131	4
ITA	Matteo Viola	137	5
ESP	Daniel Muñoz de la Nava	173	6
ITA	Thomas Fabbiano	185	7
CZE	Jan Mertl	201	8

- ^{1} Rankings are as of November 11, 2013.

=== Other entrants ===
The following players received wildcards into the singles main draw:

- (Italy) Alessandro Giannessi
- (Italy) Matteo Donati
- (Italy) Riccardo Ghedin
- (Italy) Claudio Grassi

The following players entered as an alternate into the singles main draw:

- (Italy) Alessandro Bega

The following players received entry from the qualifying draw:

- (Switzerland) Alexander Ritschard
- (Poland) Andriej Kapaś
- (Republic of Ireland) Louk Sorensen
- (Sweden) Elias Ymer

== Champions ==
=== Singles ===
- (Hungary) Márton Fucsovics def. (Germany) Dustin Brown, 6–3, 6–4

=== Doubles ===
- (Austria) Philipp Oswald / (Sweden) Andreas Siljeström def. (Italy) Alessandro Motti / (Serbia) Goran Tošić, 6–2, 6–3
