= 2016 Internazionali di Tennis Castel del Monte =

- Date: 21 November – 27 November
- Edition: 4th
- Surface: Carpet / Indoor
- Location: Andria, Italy

Champions

Singles
- (Italy) Luca Vanni

Doubles
- (Netherlands) Wesley Koolhof / (Netherlands) Matwé Middelkoop
← 2015 ·	Internazionali di Tennis Castel del Monte	· 2017 →

The 2016 Internazionali di Tennis Castel del Monte was a professional tennis tournament played on indoor carpet courts. It was the fourth edition of the tournament which was part of the 2016 ATP Challenger Tour. It took place in Andria, Italy between November 21 and November 27, 2016.

== Singles main-draw entrants ==
=== Seeds ===
Country	Player	Rank^{1}	Seed
UKR	Sergiy Stakhovsky	116	1
SUI	Marco Chiudinelli	117	2
GRE	Stefanos Tsitsipas	205	3
ITA	Luca Vanni	206	4
BIH	Aldin Šetkić	214	5
JPN	Akira Santillan	222	6
IND	Ramkumar Ramanathan	239	7
ESP	Adrián Menéndez Maceiras	240	8

- ^{1} Rankings are as of November 14, 2016.

=== Other entrants ===
The following players received wildcards into the singles main draw:

- (Italy) Matteo Berrettini
- (Spain) Tommy Robredo
- (Italy) Andrea Pellegrino
- (Italy) Stefano Travaglia

The following player received entry into the singles main draw with a special exemption:

- (Lithuania) Laurynas Grigelis

The following players received entry as alternates:

- (France) Yannick Jankovits
- (Croatia) Nikola Mektić

The following players received entry from the qualifying draw:

- (Croatia) Viktor Galović
- (Switzerland) Yann Marti
- (Austria) Maximilian Neuchrist
- (Poland) Michał Przysiężny

== Champions ==
=== Singles ===
- (Italy) Luca Vanni def. (Italy) Matteo Berrettini, 5–7, 6–0, 6–3.

=== Doubles ===
- (Netherlands) Wesley Koolhof / (Netherlands) Matwé Middelkoop def. (Czech Republic) Roman Jebavý / (Czech Republic) Zdeněk Kolář, 6–3, 6–3.
