= 2015 Internazionali di Tennis Castel del Monte – Doubles =

Doubles
- 2015 Internazionali di Tennis Castel del Monte

Final
- Champion: (Switzerland) Marco Chiudinelli (Germany) Frank Moser
- Runner-up: (Australia) Carsten Ball (Germany) Dustin Brown
- Score: 7–6^{(7–5)}, 7–5

Events
Singles	Doubles
- Internazionali di Tennis Castel del Monte

Patrick Grigoriu and Costin Pavăl were the defending champions, but they lost in the first round to Egor Gerasimov and Dimitar Kuzmanov 6–1, 6–4 .

Marco Chiudinelli and Frank Moser won the title, defeating Carsten Ball and Dustin Brown in the final 7–6^{(7–5)}, 7–5 .

== Seeds ==
1. (Poland) Mateusz Kowalczyk / (Sweden) Andreas Siljeström (semifinals)
2. (Australia) Carsten Ball / (Germany) Dustin Brown (final)
3. (Romania) Patrick Grigoriu / (Romania) Costin Pavăl (first round)
4. (Italy) Erik Crepaldi / (Italy) Matteo Volante (first round)

== Draw ==
Key

- Q = Qualifier
- WC = Wild card
- LL = Lucky loser
- Alt = Alternate
- ITF = ITF entry
- PR = Protected ranking
- SR = Special ranking
- SE = Special exempt
- JE = Junior exempt
- JR = Junior Accelerator Programme entrant
- CO = College Accelerator Programme entrant
- NG = Next Gen Accelerator Program entrant
- w/o = Walkover
- r = Retired
- d = Defaulted

=== Draw ===
First round
1	(Poland) M Kowalczyk (Sweden) A Siljeström	7^{7}	4	[10]
WC	(Italy) J Ocleppo (Italy) A Pellegrino	6^{5}	6	[8]
(Italy) G Mager (Italy) L Sonego	7^{7}	6
WC	(Italy) E Dalla Valle (Italy) Gianluca Di Nicola	6^{0}	3
3	(Romania) P Grigoriu (Romania) C Pavăl	1	4
(Belarus) E Gerasimov (Bulgaria) D Kuzmanov	6	6
WC	(Czech Republic) L Dlouhý (Czech Republic) J Šátral	6	4	[8]
(Switzerland) M Chiudinelli (Germany) F Moser	4	6	[10]
(Hungary) M Fucsovics (Italy) A Motti	6	6
(Italy) Enrico Becuzzi (Spain) Aaron Cortes Alcaraz	4	4
(Croatia) N Mektić (Croatia) A Pavić	6	6
4	(Italy) Erik Crepaldi (Italy) Matteo Volante	1	2
(Romania) P-A Luncanu (Italy) A Virgili	2	2
(Croatia) I Sabanov (Croatia) M Sabanov	6	6
(Serbia) D Petrović (Serbia) Ilija Vučić	7^{9}	5	[10]
2	(Australia) C Ball (Germany) D Brown	6^{7}	7	[12]

Quarterfinals
1	(Poland) M Kowalczyk (Sweden) A Siljeström	6	6
(Italy) G Mager (Italy) L Sonego	2	4
(Belarus) E Gerasimov (Bulgaria) D Kuzmanov	6	4	[7]
(Switzerland) M Chiudinelli (Germany) F Moser	4	6	[10]
(Hungary) M Fucsovics (Italy) A Motti
(Croatia) N Mektić (Croatia) A Pavić	w/o
(Croatia) I Sabanov (Croatia) M Sabanov	1	3
2	(Australia) C Ball (Germany) D Brown	6	6

Semifinals
1	(Poland) M Kowalczyk (Sweden) A Siljeström	5	6	[4]
(Switzerland) M Chiudinelli (Germany) F Moser	7	1	[10]
(Croatia) N Mektić (Croatia) A Pavić	6^{4}	3
2	(Australia) C Ball (Germany) D Brown	7^{7}	6

Final
(Switzerland) M Chiudinelli (Germany) F Moser	7^{7}	7
2	(Australia) C Ball (Germany) D Brown	6^{5}	5
