= 2014 Internazionali di Tennis Castel del Monte – Singles =

Singles
- 2014 Internazionali di Tennis Castel del Monte

Final
- Champion: (Lithuania) Ričardas Berankis
- Runner-up: (Georgia (country)) Nikoloz Basilashvili
- Score: 6–4, 1–0, ret.

Events
Singles	Doubles
← 2013 ·	Internazionali di Tennis Castel del Monte	· 2015 →

Márton Fucsovics was the defending champion, but he did not participate that year.

Ričardas Berankis won the title, after Nikoloz Basilashvili retired in the final, winning 6–4, 1–0, ret.

== Seeds ==
1. (Netherlands) Igor Sijsling (first round)
2. (Germany) ~~Dustin Brown~~ (withdrew)
3. (Lithuania) Ričardas Berankis (champion)
4. (Slovenia) Blaž Kavčič (first round)
5. (Turkey) Marsel İlhan (first round)
6. (Bosnia and Herzegovina) Damir Džumhur (first round)
7. (Israel) ~~Dudi Sela~~ (withdrew)
8. (Chinese Taipei) Jimmy Wang (second round, withdrew)
9. (Uzbekistan) ~~Farrukh Dustov~~ (withdrew)

== Draw ==
=== Key ===
- Q = Qualifier
- WC = Wild card
- LL = Lucky loser
- Alt = Alternate
- SE = Special exempt
- PR = Protected ranking
- ITF = ITF entry
- JE = Junior exempt
- w/o = Walkover
- r = Retired
- d = Defaulted
- SR = Special ranking

=== Finals ===
Semifinals
(Georgia (country)) Nikoloz Basilashvili	6	6
Alt	(Russia) Konstantin Kravchuk	3	4
3	(Lithuania) Ričardas Berankis	7^{7}	6
(Germany) Michael Berrer	6^{3}	3

Final
(Georgia (country)) Nikoloz Basilashvili	4	0^{r}
3	(Lithuania) Ričardas Berankis	6	1

=== Top half ===
First round
1	(Netherlands) I Sijsling	4	4
(Belarus) U Ignatik	6	6
WC	(Italy) M Berrettini	5	6^{4}
(Georgia (country)) N Basilashvili	7	7^{7}
PR	(Ukraine) S Bubka	4	2
WC	(Italy) Pietro Licciardi	6	6
(Italy) A Arnaboldi	7^{7}	6^{5}	2
8	(Chinese Taipei) J Wang	6^{3}	7^{7}	6
4	(Slovenia) B Kavčič	4	2
Q	(Bosnia and Herzegovina) M Bašić	6	6
Q	(Austria) N Reissig	4	5
(Italy) S Travaglia	6	7
WC	(Italy) M Donati	7	6
(Spain) E López Pérez	5	1
Alt	(Russia) K Kravchuk	7^{7}	6
5	(Turkey) M İlhan	6^{2}	3

Second round
(Belarus) U Ignatik	6	6^{7}	4
(Georgia (country)) N Basilashvili	4	7^{9}	6
WC	(Italy) P Licciardi	w/o
4	(Chinese Taipei) J Wang
Q	(Bosnia and Herzegovina) M Bašić	6	3	7
(Italy) S Travaglia	1	6	5
WC	(Italy) M Donati	4	7^{7}	5
Alt	(Russia) K Kravchuk	6	6^{3}	7

Quarterfinals
(Georgia (country)) N Basilashvili	7	6
WC	(Italy) P Licciardi	5	0
Q	(Bosnia and Herzegovina) M Bašić	4	7^{7}	6^{3}
Alt	(Russia) K Kravchuk	6	6^{5}	7^{7}

Semifinals
(Georgia (country)) N Basilashvili	6	6
Alt	(Russia) K Kravchuk	3	4

=== Bottom half ===
First round
6	(Bosnia and Herzegovina) D Džumhur	7^{10}	2	3
(Slovakia) J Kovalík	6^{8}	6	6
(Czech Republic) J Mertl	6	4	6
Q	(Italy) A Bega	4	6	4
(Belgium) N Desein	6^{2}	4
(Bosnia and Herzegovina) A Šetkić	7^{7}	6
(Italy) R Marcora	5	3
3	(Lithuania) R Berankis	7	6
LL	(Germany) Y Maden	3	4
LL	(Croatia) N Mektić	6	6
(Germany) M Berrer	3	6	6
WC	(Italy) F Baldi	6	1	1
Q	(Russia) A Zaitcev	6	7
(Bosnia and Herzegovina) T Brkić	4	5
(Italy) M Viola	2	6	2
LL	(Poland) A Kapaś	6	3	6

Second round
(Slovakia) J Kovalík	4	7^{7}	3
(Czech Republic) J Mertl	6	6^{5}	6
(Bosnia and Herzegovina) A Šetkić	7	3	6^{5}
3	(Lithuania) R Berankis	5	6	7^{7}
LL	(Croatia) N Mektić	6^{9}	3
(Germany) M Berrer	7^{11}	6
Q	(Russia) A Zaitcev	6	4	3
LL	(Poland) A Kapaś	4	6	6

Quarterfinals
(Czech Republic) J Mertl	6^{5}	4
3	(Lithuania) R Berankis	7^{7}	6
(Germany) M Berrer	5	7^{7}	7^{9}
LL	(Poland) A Kapaś	7	6^{5}	6^{7}

Semifinals
3	(Lithuania) R Berankis	7^{7}	6
(Germany) M Berrer	6^{3}	3
