= 2015 Internazionali di Tennis Castel del Monte – Singles =

Singles
- 2015 Internazionali di Tennis Castel del Monte

Final
- Champion: (Croatia) Ivan Dodig
- Runner-up: (Germany) Michael Berrer
- Score: 6–2, 6–1

Events
Singles	Doubles
← 2014 ·	Internazionali di Tennis Castel del Monte	· 2016 →

Ivan Dodig won the title, defeating Michael Berrer in the final 6–2, 6–1 .

== Seeds ==
1. (Georgia (country)) Nikoloz Basilashvili (second round)
2. (Ukraine) Illya Marchenko (quarterfinals)
3. (Croatia) Ivan Dodig (champion)
4. (Israel) Dudi Sela (semifinals)
5. (Italy) Luca Vanni (quarterfinals)
6. (Germany) Michael Berrer (final)
7. (Germany) Dustin Brown (first round)
8. (Bosnia and Herzegovina) Mirza Bašić (first round)

== Draw ==
=== Key ===
- Q = Qualifier
- WC = Wild card
- LL = Lucky loser
- Alt = Alternate
- SE = Special exempt
- PR = Protected ranking
- ITF = ITF entry
- JE = Junior exempt
- w/o = Walkover
- r = Retired
- d = Defaulted
- SR = Special ranking

=== Finals ===
Semifinals
6	(Germany) Michael Berrer	3	7^{7}	6
4	(Israel) Dudi Sela	6	6^{3}	3
3	(Croatia) Ivan Dodig	6	7
(Belarus) Egor Gerasimov	4	5

Final
6	(Germany) Michael Berrer	2	1
3	(Croatia) Ivan Dodig	6	6

=== Top half ===
First round
1	(Georgia (country)) N Basilashvili	7^{7}	6
(Republic of Ireland) J McGee	6^{5}	4
(Hungary) M Fucsovics	3	6	1
(Czech Republic) J Šátral	6	3	6
(Italy) M Viola	6	6
(Spain) R Ortega Olmedo	1	1
WC	(Italy) J Ocleppo	2	1
6	(Germany) M Berrer	6	6
4	(Israel) D Sela	6	6
(Switzerland) A Bossel	1	1
(Italy) A Arnaboldi	4	2
Q	(Croatia) A Pavić	6	6
PR	(Switzerland) M Chiudinelli	6	6
LL	(Croatia) V Galović	3	2
(Croatia) N Mektić	6	3	6^{3}
5/WC	(Italy) L Vanni	1	6	7^{7}

Second round
1	(Georgia (country)) N Basilashvili	6^{5}	3
(Czech Republic) J Šátral	7^{7}	6
(Italy) M Viola	6	3	2
6	(Germany) M Berrer	4	6	6
4	(Israel) D Sela	7^{7}	7^{7}
Q	(Croatia) A Pavić	6^{4}	6^{4}
PR	(Switzerland) M Chiudinelli	6^{9}	1
5/WC	(Italy) L Vanni	7^{11}	6

Quarterfinals
(Czech Republic) J Šátral	5	6^{4}
6	(Germany) M Berrer	7	7^{7}
4	(Israel) D Sela	4	6	6
5/WC	(Italy) L Vanni	6	3	4

Semifinals
6	(Germany) M Berrer	3	7^{7}	6
4	(Israel) D Sela	6	6^{3}	3

=== Bottom half ===
First round
8	(Bosnia and Herzegovina) M Bašić	6^{4}	6	5
(Italy) R Marcora	7^{7}	0	7
(Italy) Erik Crepaldi	5	6^{4}
(Italy) G Mager	7	7^{7}
Q	(Italy) L Sonego	6	6
(Serbia) D Petrović	3	2
WC	(Italy) A Pellegrino	3	4
3	(Croatia) I Dodig	6	6
7	(Germany) D Brown	3	2
(Belarus) E Gerasimov	6	6
Q	(Belgium) J De Loore	6	6
WC	(United States) Mario Giuseppe Nicosia	0	1
Q	(Romania) P-A Luncanu	7^{10}	7
(Bulgaria) D Kuzmanov	6^{8}	5
(Slovakia) F Horanský	4	0
2	(Ukraine) I Marchenko	6	6

Second round
(Italy) R Marcora	7^{7}	6
(Italy) G Mager	6^{3}	0
Q	(Italy) L Sonego	6^{0}	0
3	(Croatia) I Dodig	7^{7}	6
(Belarus) E Gerasimov	6^{7}	6	7^{7}
Q	(Belgium) J De Loore	7^{9}	4	6^{4}
Q	(Romania) P-A Luncanu	3	1
2	(Ukraine) I Marchenko	6	6

Quarterfinals
(Italy) R Marcora	2	2
3	(Croatia) I Dodig	6	6
(Belarus) E Gerasimov	6^{5}	6	6
2	(Ukraine) I Marchenko	7^{7}	4	4

Semifinals
3	(Croatia) I Dodig	6	7
(Belarus) E Gerasimov	4	5
