= 2013 Internazionali di Tennis Castel del Monte – Singles =

Singles
- 2013 Internazionali di Tennis Castel del Monte

Final
- Champion: (Hungary) Márton Fucsovics
- Runner-up: (Germany) Dustin Brown
- Score: 6–3, 6–4

Events
Singles	Doubles
Internazionali di Tennis Castel del Monte	· 2014 →

This is the first edition of the event.

Márton Fucsovics won the title, defeating Dustin Brown in the final, 6–3, 6–4.

== Seeds ==
1. (Italy) Paolo Lorenzi (first round)
2. (Austria) Andreas Haider-Maurer (second round)
3. (Germany) Dustin Brown (final)
4. (Canada) Frank Dancevic (semifinals)
5. (Italy) Matteo Viola (first round)
6. (Spain) Daniel Muñoz de la Nava (first round)
7. (Italy) Thomas Fabbiano (first round)
8. (Czech Republic) Jan Mertl (quarterfinals)

== Draw ==
=== Key ===
- Q = Qualifier
- WC = Wild card
- LL = Lucky loser
- Alt = Alternate
- SE = Special exempt
- PR = Protected ranking
- ITF = ITF entry
- JE = Junior exempt
- w/o = Walkover
- r = Retired
- d = Defaulted
- SR = Special ranking

=== Finals ===
Semifinals
(Switzerland) Yann Marti	2	1
3	(Germany) Dustin Brown	6	6
4	(Canada) Frank Dancevic	3	4
(Hungary) Márton Fucsovics	6	6

Final
3	(Germany) Dustin Brown	3	4
(Hungary) Márton Fucsovics	6	6

=== Top half ===
First round
1	(Italy) P Lorenzi	5	3
(Italy) S Travaglia	7	6
(Slovakia) I Klec	6^{6}	7^{7}	2
(Switzerland) Y Marti	7^{8}	6^{5}	6
(Spain) A Menéndez Maceiras	6	3	6
Q	(Switzerland) A Ritschard	2	6	3
(Italy) S Vagnozzi	5	4
8	(Czech Republic) J Mertl	7	6
3	(Germany) D Brown	6	7^{7}
Q	(Poland) A Kapaś	3	6^{1}
(Spain) G Olaso	0	1
(Italy) R Marcora	6	6
WC	(Italy) A Giannessi	3	2
Alt	(Italy) A Bega	6	6
Q	(Republic of Ireland) L Sorensen	6	6
6	(Spain) D Muñoz de la Nava	3	1

Second round
(Italy) S Travaglia	6	0	3
(Switzerland) Y Marti	4	6	6
(Spain) A Menéndez Maceiras	2	6^{3}
8	(Czech Republic) J Mertl	6	7^{7}
3	(Germany) D Brown	6	7
(Italy) R Marcora	4	5
Alt	(Italy) A Bega	6^{2}	3
Q	(Republic of Ireland) L Sorensen	7^{7}	6

Quarterfinals
(Switzerland) Y Marti	4	6	7
8	(Czech Republic) J Mertl	6	4	5
3	(Germany) D Brown	6	6
Q	(Republic of Ireland) L Sorensen	3	4

Semifinals
(Switzerland) Y Marti	2	1
3	(Germany) D Brown	6	6

=== Bottom half ===
First round
7	(Italy) T Fabbiano	6^{6}	2
(Uzbekistan) F Dustov	7^{8}	6
(Croatia) N Mektić	6^{5}	6	3
(Lithuania) L Grigelis	7^{7}	4	6
(Italy) M Trevisan	6	6
(Italy) G Naso	3	4
WC	(Italy) M Donati	4	2
4	(Canada) F Dancevic	6	6
5	(Italy) M Viola	6^{4}	6	3
(Italy) A Arnaboldi	7^{7}	4	6
WC	(Italy) R Ghedin	6	4	3
WC	(Italy) C Grassi	3	6	6
Q	(Sweden) E Ymer	4	3
(Hungary) M Fucsovics	6	6
(Italy) W Trusendi	3	4
2	(Austria) A Haider-Maurer	6	6

Second round
(Uzbekistan) F Dustov	7	6
(Lithuania) L Grigelis	5	3
(Italy) M Trevisan	4	2
4	(Canada) F Dancevic	6	6
(Italy) A Arnaboldi	6	6
WC	(Italy) C Grassi	2	2
(Hungary) M Fucsovics	6	6
2	(Austria) A Haider-Maurer	1	4

Quarterfinals
(Uzbekistan) F Dustov	6^{6}	6	5
4	(Canada) F Dancevic	7^{8}	4	7
(Italy) A Arnaboldi	6	2	6^{4}
(Hungary) M Fucsovics	4	6	7^{7}

Semifinals
4	(Canada) F Dancevic	3	4
(Hungary) M Fucsovics	6	6
