= 2018 Internazionali di Tennis Castel del Monte =

- Date: 19 November – 25 November
- Edition: 6th
- Surface: Carpet / Indoor
- Location: Andria, Italy

Champions

Singles
- (France) Ugo Humbert

Doubles
- (Poland) Karol Drzewiecki / (Poland) Szymon Walków
← 2017 ·	Internazionali di Tennis Castel del Monte	· 2022 →

The 2018 Internazionali di Tennis Castel del Monte was a professional tennis tournament played on indoor carpet courts. It was the sixth edition of the tournament which was part of the 2018 ATP Challenger Tour. It took place in Andria, Italy between November 19 and November 25, 2018.

== Singles main-draw entrants ==
=== Seeds ===
Country	Player	Rank^{1}	Seed
FRA	Ugo Humbert	98	1
ITA	Lorenzo Sonego	108	2
ITA	Paolo Lorenzi	115	3
ESP	Adrián Menéndez Maceiras	126	4
UKR	Sergiy Stakhovsky	138	5
FRA	Quentin Halys	141	6
FRA	Corentin Moutet	156	7
ITA	Filippo Baldi	178	8

- ^{1} Rankings are as of 12 November 2018.

=== Other entrants ===
The following players received wildcards into the singles main draw:

- (Italy) Liam Caruana
- (Italy) Julian Ocleppo
- (Italy) Andrea Pellegrino
- (Italy) Jannik Sinner

The following player received entry into the singles main draw as an alternate:

- (Italy) Alessandro Bega

The following players received entry from the qualifying draw:

- (Italy) Lorenzo Frigerio
- (Ukraine) Illya Marchenko
- (Bosnia and Herzegovina) Aldin Šetkić
- (Germany) Tobias Simon

The following players received entry as lucky losers:

- (Austria) Alexander Erler
- (Switzerland) Marc-Andrea Hüsler

== Champions ==
=== Singles ===
- (France) Ugo Humbert def. (Italy) Filippo Baldi 6–4, 7–6^{(7–3)}.

=== Doubles ===
- (Poland) Karol Drzewiecki / (Poland) Szymon Walków def. (Switzerland) Marc-Andrea Hüsler / (Netherlands) David Pel 7–6^{(12–10)}, 2–6, [11–9].
