= 2018 Internazionali di Tennis Castel del Monte – Singles =

Singles
- 2018 Internazionali di Tennis Castel del Monte

Final
- Champion: (France) Ugo Humbert
- Runner-up: (Italy) Filippo Baldi
- Score: 6–4, 7–6^{(7–3)}

Events
Singles	Doubles
- Internazionali di Tennis Castel del Monte

Uladzimir Ignatik was the defending champion but lost in the second round to Ugo Humbert.

Humbert won the title after defeating Filippo Baldi 6–4, 7–6^{(7–3)} in the final.

== Seeds ==
1. (France) Ugo Humbert (champion)
2. (Italy) Lorenzo Sonego (second round)
3. (Italy) Paolo Lorenzi (second round)
4. (Spain) Adrián Menéndez Maceiras (first round)
5. (Ukraine) Sergiy Stakhovsky (quarterfinals)
6. (France) Quentin Halys (semifinals)
7. (France) Corentin Moutet (second round)
8. (Italy) Filippo Baldi (final)

== Draw ==
Key

- Q = Qualifier
- WC = Wild card
- LL = Lucky loser
- Alt = Alternate
- ITF = ITF entry
- PR = Protected ranking
- SR = Special ranking
- SE = Special exempt
- JE = Junior exempt
- JR = Junior Accelerator Programme entrant
- CO = College Accelerator Programme entrant
- NG = Next Gen Accelerator Program entrant
- w/o = Walkover
- r = Retired
- d = Defaulted

=== Finals ===
Semifinals
1	(France) Ugo Humbert	6	6
(Germany) Kevin Krawietz	3	2
6	(France) Quentin Halys	4	4
8	(Italy) Filippo Baldi	6	6

Final
1	(France) Ugo Humbert	6	7^{7}
8	(Italy) Filippo Baldi	4	6^{3}

=== Top half ===
First round
1	(France) U Humbert	7^{7}	6
(Portugal) G Oliveira	6^{4}	3
(Czech Republic) Z Kolář	6^{4}	3
(Belarus) U Ignatik	7^{7}	6
WC	(Italy) L Caruana	6	6^{5}	7
LL	(Austria) A Erler	1	7^{7}	5
(Italy) M Viola	1	5
5	(Ukraine) S Stakhovsky	6	7
4	(Spain) A Menéndez Maceiras	6^{5}	6^{10}
LL	(Switzerland) M-A Hüsler	7^{7}	7^{12}
(Germany) K Krawietz	7^{7}	7^{7}
(Italy) G Mager	6^{3}	6^{5}
(Italy) F Gaio	6	4	6
(Spain) A Davidovich Fokina	2	6	4
Alt	(Italy) A Bega	3	3
7	(France) C Moutet	6	6

Second round
1	(France) U Humbert	7^{8}	6
(Belarus) U Ignatik	6^{6}	3
WC	(Italy) L Caruana	4	0
5	(Ukraine) S Stakhovsky	6	6
LL	(Switzerland) M-A Hüsler	7	3	6^{1}
(Germany) K Krawietz	5	6	7^{7}
(Italy) F Gaio	7	6
7	(France) C Moutet	5	3

Quarterfinals
1	(France) U Humbert	6	6
5	(Ukraine) S Stakhovsky	0	4
(Germany) K Krawietz	7^{7}	4	7^{7}
(Italy) F Gaio	6^{4}	6	6^{5}

Semifinals
1	(France) U Humbert	6	6
(Germany) K Krawietz	3	2

=== Bottom half ===
First round
6	(France) Q Halys	3	6	6
(Croatia) V Galović	6	3	4
(Italy) R Brancaccio	3	5
(Lithuania) L Grigelis	6	7
(Italy) R Marcora	7	1	7^{7}
Q	(Italy) Lorenzo Frigerio	5	6	6^{4}
WC	(Italy) A Pellegrino	4	2
3	(Italy) P Lorenzi	6	6
8	(Italy) F Baldi	6	7^{8}
(France) Y Jankovits	3	6^{6}
WC	(Italy) J Ocleppo	4	4
Q	(Bosnia and Herzegovina) A Šetkić	6	6
WC	(Italy) J Sinner	6	2	4
Q	(Ukraine) I Marchenko	4	6	6
Q	(Germany) Tobias Simon	6^{1}	7	5
2	(Italy) L Sonego	7^{7}	5	7

Second round
6	(France) Q Halys	6	7^{7}
(Lithuania) L Grigelis	3	6^{3}
(Italy) R Marcora	6	7^{9}
3	(Italy) P Lorenzi	3	6^{7}
8	(Italy) F Baldi	7^{8}	6
Q	(Bosnia and Herzegovina) A Šetkić	6^{6}	4
Q	(Ukraine) I Marchenko	6	6
2	(Italy) L Sonego	4	4

Quarterfinals
6	(France) Q Halys	3
(Italy) R Marcora	1^{r}
8	(Italy) F Baldi	6	2	7
Q	(Ukraine) I Marchenko	2	6	5

Semifinals
6	(France) Q Halys	4	4
8	(Italy) F Baldi	6	6
