= 2013 Internazionali di Tennis Castel del Monte – Doubles =

Doubles
- 2013 Internazionali di Tennis Castel del Monte

Final
- Champions: (Austria) Philipp Oswald (Sweden) Andreas Siljeström
- Runners-up: (Italy) Alessandro Motti (Croatia) Goran Tošić
- Score: 6–3, 6–2

Events
| Singles | Doubles |
| Internazionali di Tennis Castel del Monte | · 2014 → |

This was the first edition of the event.

Philipp Oswald and Andreas Siljeström won the title, defeating Alessandro Motti and Goran Tošić in the final, 6–3, 6–2.

== Seeds ==
1. (Poland) Tomasz Bednarek / (Australia) Rameez Junaid (first round)
2. (Germany) Dustin Brown / (Germany) Philipp Marx (quarterfinals)
3. (Austria) Philipp Oswald / (Sweden) Andreas Siljeström (champions)
4. (Italy) Riccardo Ghedin / (Italy) Claudio Grassi (first round)

== Draw ==
=== Key ===
- Q = Qualifier
- WC = Wild card
- LL = Lucky loser
- Alt = Alternate
- SE = Special exempt
- PR = Protected ranking
- ITF = ITF entry
- JE = Junior exempt
- w/o = Walkover
- r = Retired
- d = Defaulted
- SR = Special ranking

=== Draw ===
First round
1 | (Poland) T Bednarek (Australia) R Junaid | 7 | 6^{4} | [7]
(Italy) R Marcora (Italy) M Trevisan | 5 | 7^{7} | [10]
WC | (Italy) G Di Meo (Italy) M Viola | 4 | 4
(Poland) A Kapaś (Croatia) N Mektić | 6 | 6
4 | (Italy) R Ghedin (Italy) C Grassi | 2 | 6 | [7]
(Italy) A Motti (Serbia) G Tošić | 6 | 2 | [10]
(Hungary) M Fucsovics (Czech Republic) J Mertl | 6 | 6
(Italy) Enrico Becuzzi (Italy) P Lorenzi | 1 | 1
(Spain) G Olaso (Italy) W Trusendi | 3 | 4
(Switzerland) S Bader (United Kingdom) D Walsh | 6 | 6
(Italy) M Crugnola (Lithuania) L Grigelis | 5 | 5
3 | (Austria) P Oswald (Sweden) A Siljeström | 7 | 7
(Italy) M Donati (Italy) Edoardo Eremin | 6 | 7
WC | (Italy) Savino Lapalombella (Italy) Domenico Scelzi | 1 | 5
(Uzbekistan) F Dustov (Italy) T Fabbiano | 6^{3} | 0
2 | (Germany) D Brown (Germany) P Marx | 7^{7} | 6

Quarterfinals
(Italy) R Marcora (Italy) M Trevisan | 3 | 1
(Poland) A Kapaś (Croatia) N Mektić | 6 | 6
(Italy) A Motti (Serbia) G Tošić | 6 | 7^{7}
(Hungary) M Fucsovics (Czech Republic) J Mertl | 3 | 6^{4}
(Switzerland) S Bader (United Kingdom) D Walsh | 6^{3} | 6^{4}
3 | (Austria) P Oswald (Sweden) A Siljeström | 7^{7} | 7^{7}
(Italy) M Donati (Italy) E Eremin | 6^{5} | 7^{7} | [10]
2 | (Germany) D Brown (Germany) P Marx | 7^{7} | 6^{4} | [5]

Semifinals
(Poland) A Kapaś (Croatia) N Mektić | 2 | 1
(Italy) A Motti (Serbia) G Tošić | 6 | 6
3 | (Austria) P Oswald (Sweden) A Siljeström | 6 | 6
(Italy) M Donati (Italy) E Eremin | 4 | 0

Final
(Italy) A Motti (Serbia) G Tošić | 2 | 3
3 | (Austria) P Oswald (Sweden) A Siljeström | 6 | 6
