= 2018 Internazionali di Tennis Castel del Monte – Doubles =

Doubles
- 2018 Internazionali di Tennis Castel del Monte

Final
- Champions: (Poland) Karol Drzewiecki (Poland) Szymon Walków
- Runners-up: (Switzerland) Marc-Andrea Hüsler (Netherlands) David Pel
- Score: 7–6^{(12–10)}, 2–6, [11–9]

Events
Singles	Doubles
- Internazionali di Tennis Castel del Monte

Lorenzo Sonego and Andrea Vavassori were the defending champions but only Vavassori chose to defend his title, partnering Julian Ocleppo. Vavassori lost in the first round to Laurynas Grigelis and Alessandro Motti.

Karol Drzewiecki and Szymon Walków won the title after defeating Marc-Andrea Hüsler and David Pel 7–6^{(12–10)}, 2–6, [11–9] in the final.

== Seeds ==
1. (Belgium) Sander Gillé / (Belgium) Joran Vliegen (first round)
2. (Italy) Daniele Bracciali / (Belarus) Andrei Vasilevski (quarterfinals, withdrew)
3. (Switzerland) Luca Margaroli / (Spain) David Vega Hernández (quarterfinals)
4. (Italy) Julian Ocleppo / (Italy) Andrea Vavassori (first round)

== Draw ==
Key

- Q = Qualifier
- WC = Wild card
- LL = Lucky loser
- Alt = Alternate
- ITF = ITF entry
- PR = Protected ranking
- SR = Special ranking
- SE = Special exempt
- JE = Junior exempt
- JR = Junior Accelerator Programme entrant
- CO = College Accelerator Programme entrant
- NG = Next Gen Accelerator Program entrant
- w/o = Walkover
- r = Retired
- d = Defaulted

First round
1	(Belgium) S Gillé (Belgium) J Vliegen	6	6^{5}	[7]
(Czech Republic) Z Kolář (Portugal) G Oliveira	4	7^{7}	[10]
(Spain) G Granollers (Spain) A Menéndez Maceiras	6	6^{9}	[10]
(Italy) F Gaio (Sweden) A Siljeström	3	7^{11}	[4]
3	(Switzerland) L Margaroli (Spain) D Vega Hernández	7^{14}	6
(Italy) F Baldi (Italy) A Pellegrino	6^{12}	3
WC	(Italy) G Ricca (Italy) Giuseppe Tresca	6	3	[5]
(Poland) K Drzewiecki (Poland) S Walków	1	6	[10]
(Switzerland) M-A Hüsler (Netherlands) D Pel	6	6
(Poland) T Bednarek (Croatia) T Draganja	3	3
(Lithuania) L Grigelis (Italy) A Motti	7^{7}	6
4	(Italy) J Ocleppo (Italy) A Vavassori	6^{4}	4
(Belarus) U Ignatik (Ukraine) V Uzhylovskyi	6	7^{9}
WC	(Italy) Giacomo Dambrosi (Italy) J Sinner	2	6^{7}
WC	(Italy) R Brancaccio (Spain) S Martos Gornés	3	3
2	(Italy) D Bracciali (Belarus) A Vasilevski	6	6

Quarterfinals
(Czech Republic) Z Kolář (Portugal) G Oliveira	6	7
(Spain) G Granollers (Spain) A Menéndez Maceiras	3	5
3	(Switzerland) L Margaroli (Spain) D Vega Hernández	3	6^{4}
(Poland) K Drzewiecki (Poland) S Walków	6	7^{7}
(Switzerland) M-A Hüsler (Netherlands) D Pel	7^{9}	7
(Lithuania) L Grigelis (Italy) A Motti	6^{7}	5
(Belarus) U Ignatik (Ukraine) V Uzhylovskyi	w/o
2	(Italy) D Bracciali (Belarus) A Vasilevski

Semifinals
(Czech Republic) Z Kolář (Portugal) G Oliveira	6	3	[6]
(Poland) K Drzewiecki (Poland) S Walków	3	6	[10]
(Switzerland) M-A Hüsler (Netherlands) D Pel	7	6
(Belarus) U Ignatik (Ukraine) V Uzhylovskyi	5	4

Final
(Poland) K Drzewiecki (Poland) S Walków	7^{12}	2	[11]
(Switzerland) M-A Hüsler (Netherlands) D Pel	6^{10}	6	[9]
