= 2015 Internazionali di Tennis Castel del Monte =

- Date: 23 November – 29 November
- Edition: 3rd
- Surface: Carpet / Indoor
- Location: Andria, Italy

Champions

Singles
- (Croatia) Ivan Dodig

Doubles
- (Switzerland) Marco Chiudinelli / (Germany) Frank Moser
← 2014 ·	Internazionali di Tennis Castel del Monte	· 2016 →

The 2015 Internazionali di Tennis Castel del Monte was a professional tennis tournament played on indoor carpet courts. It was the third edition of the tournament which was part of the 2015 ATP Challenger Tour. It took place in Andria, Italy between November 23 and November 29, 2015.

== Singles main-draw entrants ==
=== Seeds ===
Country	Player	Rank^{1}	Seed
GEO	Nikoloz Basilashvili	93	1
UKR	Illya Marchenko	97	2
CRO	Ivan Dodig	103	3
ISR	Dudi Sela	104	4
ITA	Luca Vanni	115	5
GER	Michael Berrer	118	6
GER	Dustin Brown	124	7
BIH	Mirza Bašić	147	8

- ^{1} Rankings are as of November 18, 2015.

=== Other entrants ===
The following players received wildcards into the singles main draw:

- (Italy) Luca Vanni
- (Italy) Julian Ocleppo
- (Italy) Andrea Pellegrino
- (United States) Mario Giuseppe Nicosia

The following players received entry into the singles main draw with a protected ranking:

- (Switzerland) Marco Chiudinelli

The following players received entry from the qualifying draw:

- (Belgium) Joris De Loore
- (Italy) Lorenzo Sonego
- (Romania) Petru-Alexandru Luncanu
- (Croatia) Mate Pavić

The following player received as a lucky loser:

- (Croatia) Viktor Galović

== Champions ==
=== Singles ===
- (Croatia) Ivan Dodig def. (Germany) Michael Berrer 6–2, 6–1

=== Doubles ===
- (Switzerland) Marco Chiudinelli / (Germany) Frank Moser def. (Australia) Carsten Ball / (Germany) Dustin Brown 7–6^{(7–5)}, 7–5
