= 2016 Internazionali di Tennis Castel del Monte – Singles =

Singles
- 2016 Internazionali di Tennis Castel del Monte

Final
- Champion: (Italy) Luca Vanni
- Runner-up: (Italy) Matteo Berrettini
- Score: 5–7, 6–0, 6–3

Events
Singles	Doubles
- Internazionali di Tennis Castel del Monte

Ivan Dodig was the defending champion but chose not to defend his title.

Luca Vanni won the title after defeating Matteo Berrettini 5–7, 6–0, 6–3 in the final.

== Seeds ==
1. (Ukraine) Sergiy Stakhovsky (semifinals)
2. (Switzerland) Marco Chiudinelli (second round)
3. (Greece) Stefanos Tsitsipas (quarterfinals)
4. (Italy) Luca Vanni (champion)
5. (Bosnia and Herzegovina) Aldin Šetkić (quarterfinals)
6. (Japan) Akira Santillan (second round)
7. (India) Ramkumar Ramanathan (first round)
8. (Spain) Adrián Menéndez-Maceiras (first round)

== Draw ==
Key

- Q = Qualifier
- WC = Wild card
- LL = Lucky loser
- Alt = Alternate
- ITF = ITF entry
- PR = Protected ranking
- SR = Special ranking
- SE = Special exempt
- JE = Junior exempt
- JR = Junior Accelerator Programme entrant
- CO = College Accelerator Programme entrant
- NG = Next Gen Accelerator Program entrant
- w/o = Walkover
- r = Retired
- d = Defaulted

=== Finals ===
Semifinals
1	(Ukraine) Sergiy Stakhovsky	4	6	2
4	(Italy) Luca Vanni	6	2	6
(Belarus) Egor Gerasimov	6^{7}	3
WC	(Italy) Matteo Berrettini	7^{9}	6

Final
4	(Italy) Luca Vanni	5	6	6
WC	(Italy) Matteo Berrettini	7	0	3

=== Top half ===
First round
1	(Ukraine) S Stakhovsky	6	7^{7}
(Czech Republic) Z Kolář	1	6^{5}
Q	(Poland) M Przysiężny	7	2	3
(Italy) A Arnaboldi	5	6	6
WC	(Italy) S Travaglia	7	6
(Germany) Y Maden	5	3
Q	(Austria) M Neuchrist	4	4
6	(Japan) A Santillan	6	6
4	(Italy) L Vanni	7^{7}	7^{8}
Q	(Croatia) V Galović	6^{4}	6^{6}
Q	(Switzerland) Y Marti	6	6
(Spain) P Riba	3	4
(Italy) A Bega	7	2	7^{7}
WC	(Italy) A Pellegrino	5	6	6^{5}
(Italy) L Sonego	4	6	5
5	(Bosnia and Herzegovina) A Šetkić	6	3	7

Second round
1	(Ukraine) S Stakhovsky	6	6
(Italy) A Arnaboldi	2	4
WC	(Italy) S Travaglia	6	7^{7}
6	(Japan) A Santillan	3	6^{4}
4	(Italy) L Vanni	6	7^{7}
Q	(Switzerland) Y Marti	4	6^{4}
(Italy) A Bega	5	6	2
5	(Bosnia and Herzegovina) A Šetkić	7	4	6

Quarterfinals
1	(Ukraine) S Stakhovsky	6	6
WC	(Italy) S Travaglia	4	3
4	(Italy) L Vanni	7^{7}	7^{8}
5	(Bosnia and Herzegovina) A Šetkić	6^{4}	6^{6}

Semifinals
1	(Ukraine) S Stakhovsky	4	6	2
4	(Italy) L Vanni	6	2	6

=== Bottom half ===
First round
8	(Spain) A Menéndez-Maceiras	3	2
Alt	(Croatia) N Mektić	6	6
(Belarus) E Gerasimov	6	7
(Romania) D Dima	2	5
SE	(Lithuania) L Grigelis	6	6
(Germany) P Torebko	4	4
(Argentina) A Collarini	7^{7}	1	4
3	(Greece) S Tsitsipas	6^{2}	6	6
7	(India) R Ramanathan	6^{5}	6	2
(Italy) G Mager	7^{7}	3	6
WC	(Spain) T Robredo	6	4	6
(Italy) S Caruso	3	6	4
Alt	(France) Y Jankovits	4	1
WC	(Italy) M Berrettini	6	6
(France) S Doumbia	3	5
2	(Switzerland) M Chiudinelli	6	7

Second round
Alt	(Croatia) N Mektić	4	2
(Belarus) E Gerasimov	6	6
SE	(Lithuania) L Grigelis	6^{6}	6	3
3	(Greece) S Tsitsipas	7^{8}	4	6
(Italy) G Mager	4	2
WC	(Spain) T Robredo	6	6
WC	(Italy) M Berrettini	7^{7}	6^{4}	7^{8}
2	(Switzerland) M Chiudinelli	6^{4}	7^{7}	6^{6}

Quarterfinals
(Belarus) E Gerasimov	4	6	7
3	(Greece) S Tsitsipas	6	3	5
WC	(Spain) T Robredo	4	6^{3}
WC	(Italy) M Berrettini	6	7^{7}

Semifinals
(Belarus) E Gerasimov	6^{7}	3
WC	(Italy) M Berrettini	7^{9}	6
