= 2017 Internazionali di Tennis Castel del Monte =

- Date: 20 November – 26 November
- Edition: 5th
- Surface: Carpet / Indoor
- Location: Andria, Italy

Champions

Singles
- (Belarus) Uladzimir Ignatik

Doubles
- (Italy) Lorenzo Sonego / (Italy) Andrea Vavassori
- Internazionali di Tennis Castel del Monte

The 2017 Internazionali di Tennis Castel del Monte was a professional tennis tournament played on indoor carpet courts. It was the fifth edition of the tournament which was part of the 2017 ATP Challenger Tour. It took place in Andria, Italy between November 20 and November 26, 2017.

== Singles main-draw entrants ==
=== Seeds ===
Country	Player	Rank^{1}	Seed
ITA	Stefano Travaglia	136	1
LTU	Ričardas Berankis	142	2
BIH	Mirza Bašić	162	3
BIH	Aldin Šetkić	173	4
BLR	Uladzimir Ignatik	175	5
CRO	Viktor Galović	213	6
ITA	Lorenzo Sonego	214	7
CZE	Zdeněk Kolář	218	8

- ^{1} Rankings are as of 13 November 2017.

=== Other entrants ===
The following players received wildcards into the singles main draw:

- (Italy) Filippo Baldi
- (Italy) Enrico Dalla Valle
- (Italy) Andrea Pellegrino

The following player received entry into the singles main draw using a protected ranking:

- (Netherlands) Igor Sijsling

The following players received entry from the qualifying draw:

- (Italy) Gianluca Di Nicola
- (Belgium) Christopher Heyman
- (France) Constant Lestienne
- (Italy) Andrea Vavassori

The following player received entry as a lucky loser:

- (Russia) Denis Matsukevich

== Champions ==
=== Singles ===
- (Belarus) Uladzimir Ignatik def. (Belgium) Christopher Heyman 6–7^{(3–7)}, 6–4, 7–6^{(7–3)}.

=== Doubles ===
- (Italy) Lorenzo Sonego / (Italy) Andrea Vavassori def. (Netherlands) Sander Arends / (Belgium) Sander Gillé 6–3, 3–6, [10–7].
