= Costin Pavăl =

Romanian tennis player (born 1990)

- Full name: Costin Pavăl
- Country (sports): Romania
- Residence: Miami, United States
- Born: 1 September 1990 (age 34); Bucharest, Romania
- Height: 1.88 m (6 ft 2 in)
- Plays: Left-handed (two handed-backhand)
- Prize money: $33,089

Singles
- Career titles: 0
- Highest ranking: No. 722 (9 June 2014)

Doubles
- Career titles: 1 Challenger, 5 ITF
- Highest ranking: No. 138 (3 August 2015)

Costin Pavăl (born 1 September 1990 in Bucharest) is a Romanian tennis player.

Pavăl has a career high ATP singles ranking of 722 achieved on 9 June 2014. He also has a career high ATP doubles ranking of 138 achieved on 3 August 2015.

Pavăl won his first ATP Challenger Tour doubles title at the 2014 Internazionali di Tennis Castel del Monte, partnering Patrick Grigoriu, defeating Roman Jebavý and Andreas Siljeström in the final, 7–6^{(7–4)}, 6–7^{(4–7)}, [10–5].

Sporting positions
Preceded by (United States) Austin Krajicek	Big 12 Tennis Player of the Year; 2012; 2013	Succeeded by (Denmark) Søren Hess-Olesen
