= Roman Jebavý =

Czech tennis player (born 1989)

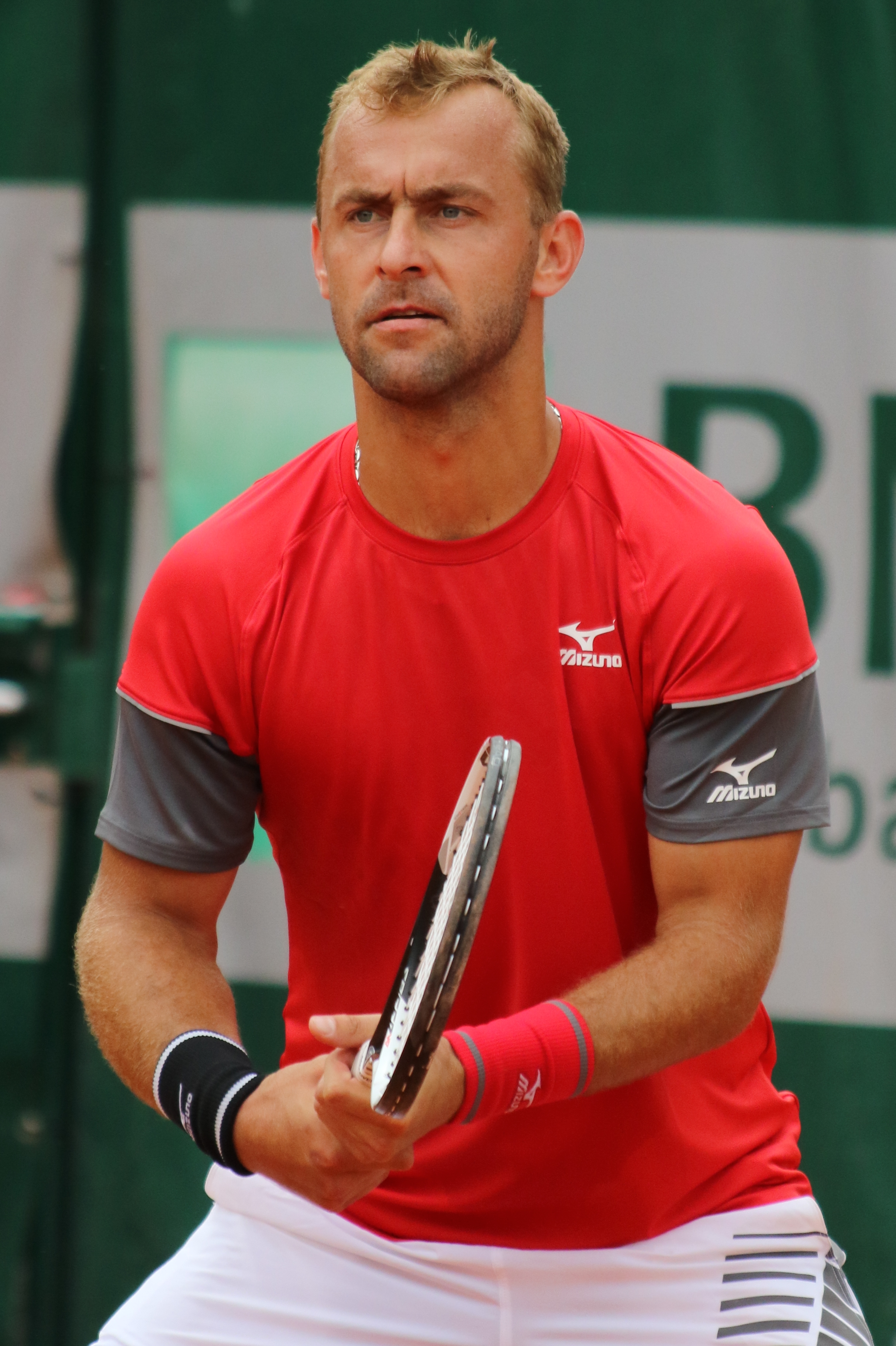
- Jebavý at the 2018 French Open
- Country (sports): Czech Republic
- Residence: Prague, Czechia
- Born: 16 November 1989 (age 36) Turnov, Czechoslovakia
- Height: 6 ft 1 in (1.85 m)
- Turned pro: 2009
- Retired: August 2024
- Plays: Right-handed (double-handed backhand)
- Coach: Lukáš Dlouhý
- Prize money: $726,864

Singles
- Career record: 0–0
- Career titles: 0
- Highest ranking: No. 297 (30 September 2013)

Doubles
- Career record: 78–93
- Career titles: 4
- Highest ranking: No. 43 (4 March 2019)

Grand Slam doubles results
- Australian Open: 1R (2018, 2019, 2020)
- French Open: 3R (2017)
- Wimbledon: 2R (2018)
- US Open: 3R (2018)

Grand Slam mixed doubles results
- Wimbledon: 3R (2017)
- US Open: 1R (2018)
- Last updated on: 1 April 2025.

Roman Jebavý (born 16 November 1989) is a Czech former professional tennis player. He is a doubles specialist who has won four ATP Tour doubles titles. He reached a career-high ranking in doubles of World No. 43 on 4 March 2019.

== Career ==
=== 2007: Juniors ===
Jebavý reached the 2007 Wimbledon final unseeded with Martin Kližan, before losing to Matteo Trevisan and Daniel López in the final. He reached a career-high junior ranking of world No. 3.

He entered the 2007 U.S. Open seeded first in doubles with Vladimir Ignatic. The tandem lost in the semifinals to champions Jonathan Eysseric and Jerome Interzillo. Jebavý also lost in the singles tournament in the quarterfinals to eventual champion Ričardas Berankis.

=== 2008: Turned Pro, First ITF singles and doubles titles ===
Jebavy reached his first final on the Futures circuit in Thailand F2 in February 2008. He won his first Futures title a couple of months later in Teplice, Czech Republic. He also won five Futures titles in doubles.

=== 2017: First ATP doubles titles ===
He won his first two doubles titles at the 2017 Istanbul Open and the 2017 St. Petersburg Open.

=== 2024: Retirement ===
Jebavý announced his retirement from professional tennis in August 2024.

== Junior Grand Slam finals ==
=== Doubles: 1 (1 runner-up) ===
Result	Year	Tournament	Surface	Partner	Opponents	Score
Loss	2007	Wimbledon	Grass	(Slovakia) Martin Kližan	(Paraguay) Daniel Alejandro López (Italy) Matteo Trevisan	6–7^{(5–7)}, 6–4, [8–10]

== ATP Tour finals ==
=== Doubles: 8 (4 titles, 4 runner-ups) ===
Legend Grand Slam Tournaments (0–0) ATP World Tour Finals (0–0) ATP World Tour Masters 1000 (0–0) ATP World Tour 500 Series (0–0) ATP World Tour 250 Series (4–3)	Finals by surface Hard (1–1) Clay (3–2) Grass (0–0) Carpet (0–0)

Result	W–L	Date	Tournament	Tier	Surface	Partner	Opponents	Score
Win	1–0	May 2017	Istanbul Open, Turkey	250 Series	Clay	(Czech Republic) Jiří Veselý	(Turkey) Tuna Altuna (Italy) Alessandro Motti	6–0, 6–0
Win	2–0	Sep 2017	St. Petersburg Open, Russia	250 Series	Hard (i)	(Netherlands) Matwé Middelkoop	(Chile) Julio Peralta (Argentina) Horacio Zeballos	6–4, 6–4
Loss	2–1	May 2018	Lyon Open, France	250 Series	Clay	(Netherlands) Matwé Middelkoop	(Australia) Nick Kyrgios (United States) Jack Sock	5–7, 6–2, [9–11]
Loss	2–2	Jul 2018	Croatia Open Umag, Croatia	250 Series	Clay	(Czech Republic) Jiří Veselý	(Netherlands) Robin Haase (Netherlands) Matwé Middelkoop	4–6, 4–6
Win	3–2	Aug 2018	Austrian Open Kitzbühel, Austria	250 Series	Clay	(Argentina) Andrés Molteni	(Italy) Daniele Bracciali (Argentina) Federico Delbonis	6–2, 6–4
Loss	3–3	Sep 2018	St. Petersburg Open, Russia	250 Series	Hard (i)	(Netherlands) Matwé Middelkoop	(Italy) Matteo Berrettini (Italy) Fabio Fognini	6–7^{(6–8)}, 6–7^{(4–7)}
Win	4–3	Feb 2019	Córdoba Open, Argentina	250 Series	Clay	(Argentina) Andrés Molteni	(Argentina) Máximo González (Argentina) Horacio Zeballos	6–4, 7–6^{(7–4)}
Loss	4–4	Jul 2021	Austrian Open Kitzbühel, Austria	250 Series	Clay	(Netherlands) Matwé Middelkoop	(Austria) Alexander Erler (Austria) Lucas Miedler	5–7, 6–7^{(5–7)}

== ATP Challenger and ITF Futures finals ==
=== Singles: 14 (5–9) ===
Legend ATP Challenger (0–0) ITF Futures (5–9)	Finals by surface Hard (0–4) Clay (4–4) Grass (0–0) Carpet (1–1)

Result	W–L	Date	Tournament	Tier	Surface	Opponent	Score
Loss	0–1	Feb 2008	Thailand F2, Laksi	Futures	Hard	(Germany) Sebastian Rieschick	2–6, 0–2 ret.
Win	1–1	May 2008	Czech Republic F1, Teplice	Futures	Clay	(Czech Republic) Martin Vacek	4–6, 7–5, 7–5
Loss	1–2	Jul 2008	Austria F6, Kramsach	Futures	Clay	(Austria) Johannes Ager	6–4, 3–6, 1–6
Loss	1–3	Jul 2009	Germany F9, Römerberg	Futures	Clay	(Romania) Petru-Alexandru Luncanu	3–6, 4–6
Loss	1–4	Oct 2009	Thailand F4, Bangkok	Futures	Hard	(New Zealand) José Statham	3–6, 6–2, 5–7
Loss	1–5	Jun 2010	Germany F6, Wolfsburg	Futures	Clay	(Australia) James Lemke	4–6, 2–6
Loss	1–6	Aug 2010	Slovakia F3, Michalovce	Futures	Clay	(Slovakia) Michal Pazicky	2–6, 7–5, 2–6
Win	2–6	Jul 2011	Germany F8, Römerberg	Futures	Clay	(Chile) Hans Podlipnik Castillo	6–2, 6–0
Loss	2–7	Oct 2012	Qatar F4, Doha	Futures	Hard	(Greece) Theodoros Angelinos	5–7, 5–7
Win	3–7	Nov 2012	Czech Republic F7, Rožnov pod Radhoštěm	Futures	Carpet	(Czech Republic) Jan Šátral	6–2, 6–4
Loss	3–8	Nov 2012	Czech Republic F8, Opava	Futures	Carpet	(United Kingdom) Neil Pauffley	4–6, 6–2, 4–6
Win	4–8	Jun 2013	Bulgaria F5, Stara Zagora	Futures	Clay	(Bulgaria) Dimitar Kutrovsky	7–5, 6–4
Win	5–8	Jul 2013	Italy F18, Fano	Futures	Clay	(Italy) Claudio Fortuna	6–3, 4–6, 7–5
Loss	5–9	Mar 2014	Italy F3, Trento	Futures	Hard	(Croatia) Nikola Mektić	3–6, 7–5, 1–6

=== Doubles: 106 (59–47) ===
Legend ATP Challenger (15–24) ITF Futures (44–23)	Finals by surface Hard (16–12) Clay (36–31) Grass (0–0) Carpet (7–4)

Result	W–L	Date	Tournament	Tier	Surface	Partner	Opponents	Score
Loss	0–1	May 2005	Czech Republic F2, Jablonec	Futures	Clay	(Czech Republic) Dusan Hajatko	(Czech Republic) Daniel Lustig (Czech Republic) Josef Neštický	4–6, 2–6
Loss	0–2	Nov 2007	Tunisia F6, Jerba	Futures	Hard	(Czech Republic) Filip Zeman	(Poland) Adam Chadaj (Belarus) Sergey Betov	0–6, 3–6
Loss	0–3	Feb 2008	Thailand F2, Laksi	Futures	Hard	(Czech Republic) Filip Zeman	(Indonesia) Christopher Rungkat (United States) Nathan Thompson	4–6, 2–6
Win	1–3	May 2008	Czech Republic F1, Teplice	Futures	Clay	(Czech Republic) Filip Zeman	(Canada) Érik Chvojka (Canada) Vasek Pospisil	6–4, 6–7^{(6–8)}, [10–8]
Win	2–3	May 2008	Czech Republic F2, Most	Futures	Clay	(Czech Republic) Filip Zeman	(Germany) Martin Emmrich (Lithuania) Gvidas Sabeckis	7–5, 6–2
Win	3–3	Jun 2008	Germany F7, Marburg	Futures	Clay	(Czech Republic) David Novak	(Spain) Óscar Burrieza López (Russia) Nikolai Nesterov	6–4, 6–2
Win	4–3	Aug 2008	Slovakia F1, Žilina	Futures	Clay	(Czech Republic) Filip Zeman	(Poland) Robert Godlewski (Australia) Raphael Durek	7–6^{(7–4)}, 4–6, [10–2]
Win	5–3	Oct 2008	Germany F23, Isernhagen	Futures	Hard	(Poland) Grzegorz Panfil	(Spain) Ignacio Coll Riudavets (Russia) Dmitri Sitak	6–3, 7–6^{(7–1)}
Win	6–3	May 2009	Czech Republic F3, Jablonec	Futures	Clay	(Slovakia) Martin Kližan	(Czech Republic) Michal Tabara (Czech Republic) Roman Vögeli	6–4, 6–4
Loss	6–4	Jun 2009	Slovenia F3, Koper	Futures	Clay	(Czech Republic) David Novak	(Canada) Milos Raonic (Ukraine) Denys Molchanov	5–7, 7–5, [5–10]
Win	7–4	Jul 2009	Italy F17, Bologna	Futures	Clay	(Slovakia) Martin Kližan	(Italy) Francesco Aldi (Italy) Federico Torresi	6–3, 7–6^{(8–6)}
Win	8–4	Jul 2009	Germany F9, Römerberg	Futures	Clay	(Canada) Érik Chvojka	(Germany) Martin Emmrich (Germany) Kevin Deden	6–4, 3–6, [10–4]
Loss	8–5	Jul 2009	Austria F5, Telfs	Futures	Clay	(Poland) Mateusz Kowalczyk	(Austria) Gerald Melzer (Austria) Philipp Oswald	5–7, 6–4, [7–10]
Win	9–5	Oct 2009	Thailand F4, Bangkok	Futures	Hard	(Australia) José Statham	(Hungary) Kornél Bardóczky (Hungary) Ádám Kellner	6–4, 6–4
Win	10–5	Oct 2009	Thailand F5, Nakhon Ratchasima	Futures	Hard	(Finland) Harri Heliövaara	(New Zealand) Matt Simpson (New Zealand) William Ward	6–2, 6–2
Win	11–5	Nov 2009	Czech Republic F5, Opava	Futures	Carpet	(Slovakia) Andrej Martin	(Czech Republic) Jaroslav Pospíšil (Czech Republic) Pavel Šnobel	7–6^{(7–2)}, 6–4
Win	12–5	Feb 2010	Germany F4, Nussloch	Futures	Carpet	(Czech Republic) Daniel Lustig	(Germany) Martin Emmrich (Germany) Sebastian Rieschick	6–3, 7–6^{(7–4)}
Win	13–5	May 2010	Czech Republic F2, Most	Futures	Clay	(Russia) Andrey Kumantsov	(Slovakia) Kamil Čapkovič (Slovakia) Miloslav Mečíř	6–4, 6–2
Loss	13–6	Jun 2010	Germany F5, Koeln	Futures	Clay	(Russia) Andrey Kumantsov	(Greece) Paris Gemouchidis (Chile) Hans Podlipnik Castillo	4–6, 5–7
Loss	13–7	Jul 2010	Germany F8, Römerberg	Futures	Clay	(Czech Republic) Jiri Kosler	(Germany) Marco Kirschner (Germany) Marko Lenz	4–6, 7–6^{(7–5)}, [8–10]
Loss	13–8	Aug 2010	Slovakia F2, Piešťany	Futures	Clay	(Czech Republic) Marek Michalička	(France) Jérôme Inzerillo (France) Florian Reynet	4–6, 6–4, [8–10]
Loss	13–9	Aug 2010	Slovakia F3, Michalovce	Futures	Clay	(Czech Republic) Lubomir Majsajdr	(Slovakia) Adrian Sikora (Slovakia) Michal Pazicky	2–6, 4–6
Loss	13–10	Oct 2010	Germany F18, Isernhagen	Futures	Hard	(Czech Republic) Daniel Lustig	(Germany) Stefan Seifert (Germany) Nicolas Kiefer	6–3, 2–6, [7–10]
Loss	13–11	Nov 2010	Czech Republic F4, Rožnov	Futures	Carpet	(Czech Republic) Jan Mertl	(Poland) Marcin Gawron (Russia) Denis Matsukevich	3–6, 6–7^{(5–7)}
Win	14–11	Mar 2011	Turkey F7, Antalya	Futures	Hard	(Slovakia) Adrian Sikora	(Italy) Francesco Piccari (Italy) Pietro Fanucci	4–6, 6–2, [10–6]
Loss	14–12	Mar 2011	Turkey F8, Antalya	Futures	Hard	(Slovakia) Adrian Sikora	(Moldova) Radu Albot (Ukraine) Denys Molchanov	7–6^{(7–3)}, 3–6, [10–12]
Loss	14–13	May 2011	Czech Republic F1, Teplice	Futures	Clay	(Czech Republic) Michal Konecny	(Belarus) Aliaksandr Bury (Belarus) Nikolai Fidirko	3–6, 4–6
Win	15–13	May 2011	Czech Republic F2, Most	Futures	Clay	(Latvia) Andis Juška	(Austria) Daniel Köllerer (Austria) Markus Egger	6–4, 6–2
Loss	15–14	Jun 2011	Poland F4, Bytom	Futures	Clay	(Canada) Érik Chvojka	(Poland) Andriej Kapaś (Poland) Błażej Koniusz	5–7, 4–6
Loss	15–15	Jul 2011	Germany F8, Römerberg	Futures	Clay	(Romania) Andrei Mlendea	(Argentina) Juan-Pablo Amado (Australia) Brydan Klein	4–6, 1–6
Loss	15–16	Jul 2011	Austria F2, Kramsach	Futures	Clay	(Czech Republic) Roman Vögeli	(Austria) Maximilian Neuchrist (Austria) Tristan-Samuel Weissborn	3–6, 3–6
Win	16–16	Aug 2011	Kazakhstan F5, Astana	Futures	Hard	(Ukraine) Denys Molchanov	(Russia) Vitali Reshetnikov (Russia) Ilia Starkov	6–4, 6–4
Loss	16–17	Sep 2011	Austria F8, St Pölten	Futures	Clay	(Slovakia) Michal Pazicky	(Austria) Maximilian Neuchrist (Austria) Tristan-Samuel Weissborn	5–7, 7–5, [9–11]
Win	17–17	Sep 2011	Poland F9, Legnica	Futures	Clay	(Slovakia) Adrian Sikora	(Poland) Aleksander Charpantidis (Poland) Marek Pokrywka	6–3, 6–1
Win	18–17	Oct 2011	Hungary F3, Budapest	Futures	Clay	(Slovakia) Norbert Gombos	(Austria) Lukas Weinhandl (Austria) Mario Kargl	6–2, 6–0
Loss	18–18	Oct 2011	Morocco F8, Tanger	Futures	Clay	(Czech Republic) Jan Šátral	(Italy) Luca Vanni (Italy) Matteo Viola	3–6, 5–7
Win	19–18	Oct 2011	Morocco F9, Fes	Futures	Clay	(Czech Republic) Jan Šátral	(Italy) Luca Vanni (France) Florent Diep	6–7^{(6–8)}, 7–6^{(7–3)}, [10–7]
Win	20–18	Nov 2011	Czech Republic F4, Rožnov	Futures	Carpet	(Czech Republic) Jan Šátral	(Belarus) Aliaksandr Bury (Belarus) Sergey Betov	6–4, 6–3
Win	21–18	Mar 2012	Croatia F3, Umag	Futures	Clay	(Slovakia) Andrej Martin	(Croatia) Marin Draganja (Croatia) Dino Marcan	6–3, 7–5
Win	22–18	Jul 2012	Czech Republic F5, Prague	Futures	Clay	(Czech Republic) Jan Šátral	(Slovakia) Patrik Fabian (Slovakia) Adrian Partl	6–1, 6–2
Win	23–18	Aug 2012	Slovakia F3, Poprad	Futures	Clay	(Czech Republic) Jan Šátral	(Slovakia) Filip Havaj (Slovakia) Juraj Simcak	6–2, 7–6^{(7–2)}
Win	24–18	Sep 2012	Iran F1, Esfahan	Futures	Clay	(Czech Republic) Michal Schmid	(India) N. Sriram Balaji (India) Ranjeet Virali-Murugesan	6–4, 6–4
Win	25–18	Oct 2012	Qatar F2, Doha	Futures	Hard	(Czech Republic) Otakar Lucak	(Poland) Andriej Kapaś (Poland) Adam Chadaj	6–4, 6–4
Win	26–18	Nov 2012	Czech Republic F7, Rožnov	Futures	Carpet	(Czech Republic) Jan Šátral	(Belarus) Aliaksandr Bury (Belarus) Nikolai Fidirko	6–7^{(5–7)}, 6–1, [10–5]
Win	27–18	Jan 2013	Israel F1, Eilat	Futures	Hard	(Czech Republic) Jiří Veselý	(Spain) Andoni Vivanco-Guzmán (Spain) Jaime Pulgar-Garcia	6–3, 6–1
Win	28–18	Jan 2013	Israel F2, Eilat	Futures	Hard	(Czech Republic) Jiří Veselý	(Italy) Claudio Grassi (Italy) Matteo Fago	6–4, 7–5
Win	29–18	Feb 2013	Israel F3, Eilat	Futures	Hard	(Czech Republic) Libor Salaba	(Italy) Claudio Grassi (Italy) Omar Giacalone	4–6, 7–6^{(7–4)}, [10–3]
Loss	29–19	May 2013	Czech Republic F2, Teplice	Futures	Clay	(Czech Republic) Jan Šátral	(Czech Republic) Marek Michalička (Czech Republic) David Pultr	6–3, 3–6, [6–10]
Win	30–19	Jun 2013	Bosnia & Herzegovina F2, Brčko	Futures	Clay	(Czech Republic) Libor Salaba	(Croatia) Antun Pehar (Croatia) Duje Delic	6–2, 6–4
Win	31–19	Jun 2013	Bulgaria F4, Burgas	Futures	Clay	(Czech Republic) Michal Schmid	(Ukraine) Gleb Alekseenko (Ukraine) Alexandr Kushakov	6–2, 6–1
Loss	31–20	Aug 2013	Cordenons, Italy	Challenger	Clay	(Slovakia) Norbert Gombos	(Croatia) Franko Škugor (Croatia) Marin Draganja	4–6, 4–6
Win	32–20	Sep 2013	Germany F16, Kenn	Futures	Clay	(Netherlands) Sander Groen	(France) Jérôme Inzerillo (France) François-Arthur Vibert	6–1, ret
Loss	32–21	Sep 2013	Fergana, Uzbekistan	Challenger	Hard	(Slovakia) Ilija Bozoljac	(Uzbekistan) Farrukh Dustov (Tunisia) Malek Jaziri	3–6, 3–6
Loss	32–22	Oct 2013	Greece F16, Heraklion	Futures	Hard	(Czech Republic) Václav Šafránek	(Slovenia) Tom Kočevar-Dešman (Germany) Torsten Wietoska	3–6, 6–4, [3–10]
Loss	32–23	Dec 2013	Czech Republic F7, Opava	Futures	Carpet	(Czech Republic) Jan Blecha	(Poland) Błażej Koniusz (Poland) Maciej Smola	3–6, 0–6
Win	33–23	Feb 2014	Germany F4, Nussloch	Futures	Carpet	(Czech Republic) Marek Michalička	(Netherlands) Romano Frantzen (Netherlands) Thomas Schoorel	7–6^{(8–6)}, 7–5
Win	34–23	Feb 2014	Italy F1, Sondrio	Futures	Hard	(Czech Republic) Robin Stanek	(Serbia) Ilija Vucic (Serbia) Nikola Ćaćić	3–6, 7–5, [10–7]
Win	35–23	Mar 2014	Turkey F8, Antalya	Futures	Hard	(Czech Republic) Jan Šátral	(Portugal) Frederico Ferreira Silva (Portugal) Romain Barbosa	6–2, 6–2
Win	36–23	Mar 2014	Turkey F9, Antalya	Futures	Hard	(Czech Republic) Jan Šátral	(Russia) Anton Manegin (Russia) Aleksandr Vasilenko	6–3, 6–4
Win	37–23	Jun 2014	Prague, Czech Republic	Challenger	Clay	(Czech Republic) Jiří Veselý	(Chinese Taipei) Lee Hsin-han (China) Zhang Ze	6–1, 6–3
Win	38–23	Jul 2014	Austria F4, Kramsach	Futures	Clay	(Czech Republic) Jan Šátral	(Czech Republic) Frantisek Polanka (Czech Republic) Dominik Sochurek	6–1, 7–5
Win	39–23	Aug 2014	Liberec, Czech Republic	Challenger	Clay	(Czech Republic) Jaroslav Pospíšil	(Philippines) Ruben Gonzales (United Kingdom) Sean Thornley	6–4, 6–3
Win	40–23	Aug 2014	Poland F5, Poznań	Futures	Clay	(Slovakia) Adrian Sikora	(Poland) Błażej Koniusz (Poland) Andriej Kapaś	4–6, 6–3, [10–5]
Win	41–23	Sep 2014	Trnava, Slovakia	Challenger	Clay	(Czech Republic) Jaroslav Pospíšil	(Netherlands) Stephan Fransen (Netherlands) Robin Haase	6–4, 6–2
Loss	41–24	Nov 2014	Brescia, Italy	Challenger	Hard	(Poland) Błażej Koniusz	(Ukraine) Illya Marchenko (Ukraine) Denys Molchanov	6–7^{(4–7)}, 3–6
Loss	41–25	Nov 2014	Andria, Italy	Challenger	Hard	(Sweden) Andreas Siljeström	(Romania) Patrick Grigoriu (Romania) Costin Pavăl	6–7^{(4–7)}, 7–6^{(7–4)}, [5–10]
Win	42–25	Mar 2015	Egypt F10, Sharm El Sheikh	Futures	Hard	(Czech Republic) Jaroslav Pospíšil	(Czech Republic) Jan Šátral (Czech Republic) Libor Salaba	6–4, 6–3
Win	43–25	Mar 2015	Egypt F11, Sharm El Sheikh	Futures	Hard	(Czech Republic) Jaroslav Pospíšil	(Czech Republic) Jan Šátral (Czech Republic) Libor Salaba	6–4, 6–2
Win	44–25	Apr 2015	Egypt F12, Sharm El Sheikh	Futures	Hard	(Czech Republic) Libor Salaba	(Serbia) Danilo Petrovic (Serbia) Ilija Vucic	3–6, 6–3, [10–8]
Loss	44–26	May 2015	Ostrava, Czech Republic	Challenger	Clay	(Czech Republic) Jan Šátral	(Slovakia) Andrej Martin (Chile) Hans Podlipnik Castillo	6–4, 5–7, [1–10]
Win	45–26	May 2015	Czech Republic F3, Most	Futures	Clay	(Czech Republic) Jan Šátral	(Belarus) Uladzimir Ignatik (Czech Republic) Dominik Kellovský	6–4, 4–6, [10–5]
Win	46–26	Jun 2015	Poprad, Slovakia	Challenger	Clay	(Czech Republic) Jan Šátral	(Slovakia) Norbert Gombos (Czech Republic) Adam Pavlásek	6–2, 6–2
Win	47–26	Jun 2015	Czech Republic F4, Pardubice	Futures	Clay	(Czech Republic) Jan Šátral	(Czech Republic) Václav Šafránek (Czech Republic) Filip Dolezel	6–4, 6–3
Win	48–26	Jul 2015	Czech Republic F6, Brno	Futures	Clay	(Belarus) Uladzimir Ignatik	(Czech Republic) Václav Šafránek (Czech Republic) Dušan Lojda	6–1, 6–4
Loss	48–27	May 2016	Czech Republic F1, Most	Futures	Clay	(Czech Republic) Libor Salaba	(Germany) Andreas Mies (Australia) Steven de Waard	7–5, 5–7, [7–10]
Loss	48–28	Jul 2016	Czech Republic F4, Pardubice	Futures	Clay	(Czech Republic) David Novak	(Czech Republic) Jan Hernych (Czech Republic) Zdeněk Kolář	1–6, 4–6
Loss	48–29	Aug 2016	Trnava, Slovakia	Challenger	Clay	(Poland) Tomasz Bednarek	(Belgium) Sander Gillé (Belgium) Joran Vliegen	2–6, 5–7
Loss	48–30	Aug 2016	Cordenons, Italy	Challenger	Clay	(Czech Republic) Zdeněk Kolář	(Germany) Andre Begemann (Belarus) Aliaksandr Bury	7–5, 4–6, [9–11]
Win	49–30	Sep 2016	Como, Italy	Challenger	Clay	(Slovakia) Andrej Martin	(Germany) Nils Langer (Austria) Gerald Melzer	3–6, 6–1, [10–5]
Win	50–30	Sep 2016	Banja Luka, Bosnia & Herzegovina	Challenger	Clay	(Czech Republic) Jan Šátral	(Italy) Andrea Arnaboldi (Austria) Maximilian Neuchrist	7–6^{(7–3)}, 4–6, [10–7]
Loss	50–31	Oct 2016	Mohammedia, Morocco	Challenger	Clay	(Slovakia) Andrej Martin	(Croatia) Antonio Šančić (Croatia) Dino Marcan	6–7^{(3–7)}, 4–6
Win	51–31	Oct 2016	Casablanca, Morocco	Challenger	Clay	(Slovakia) Andrej Martin	(Croatia) Antonio Šančić (Croatia) Dino Marcan	6–4, 6–2
Loss	51–32	Nov 2016	Eckental, Germany	Challenger	Carpet	(Slovakia) Andrej Martin	(Germany) Kevin Krawietz (France) Albano Olivetti	7–6^{(10–8)}, 4–6, [7–10]
Loss	51–33	Nov 2016	Andria, Italy	Challenger	Hard	(Czech Republic) Zdeněk Kolář	(Netherlands) Matwé Middelkoop (Netherlands) Wesley Koolhof	3–6, 3–6
Loss	51–34	Jan 2017	Koblenz, Germany	Challenger	Hard	(Czech Republic) Lukáš Rosol	(Chile) Hans Podlipnik Castillo (Belarus) Andrei Vasilevski	5–7, 6–3, [14–16]
Win	52–34	Feb 2017	Cherbourg, France	Challenger	Hard	(Slovakia) Igor Zelenay	(Austria) Tristan-Samuel Weissborn (Croatia) Dino Marcan	7–6^{(7–4)}, 6–7^{(4–7)}, [10–6]
Win	53–34	May 2017	Heilbronn, Germany	Challenger	Clay	(Croatia) Antonio Šančić	(Slovakia) Igor Zelenay (Canada) Adil Shamasdin	6–4, 6–1
Loss	53–35	Jun 2017	Prostějov, Czech Republic	Challenger	Clay	(Chile) Hans Podlipnik Castillo	(Argentina) Andrés Molteni (Argentina) Guillermo Durán	6–7^{(5–7)}, 7–6^{(7–5)}, [6–10]
Win	54–35	Aug 2017	Cordenons, Italy	Challenger	Clay	(Czech Republic) Zdeněk Kolář	(Slovakia) Igor Zelenay (Netherlands) Matwé Middelkoop	6–2, 6–3
Loss	54–36	Aug 2017	Manerbio, Italy	Challenger	Clay	(Russia) Mikhail Elgin	(Monaco) Romain Arneodo (France) Hugo Nys	6–4, 6–7^{(3–7)}, [5–10]
Win	55–36	Nov 2017	Eckental, Germany	Challenger	Carpet	(Netherlands) Sander Arends	(United Kingdom) Ken Skupski (United Kingdom) Neal Skupski	6–2, 6–4
Loss	55–37	Nov 2019	Eckental, Germany	Challenger	Carpet	(Netherlands) Sander Arends	(United Kingdom) Ken Skupski (Australia) John-Patrick Smith	6–7^{(2–7)}, 4–6
Loss	55–38	Nov 2019	Bratislava, Slovakia	Challenger	Hard	(Slovakia) Igor Zelenay	(Denmark) Frederik Nielsen (Germany) Tim Pütz	6–4, 6–7^{(4–7)}, [9–11]
Loss	55–39	June 2021	Prostějov, Czech Republic	Challenger	Clay	(Czech Republic) Zdeněk Kolář	(Kazakhstan) Aleksandr Nedovyesov (Portugal) Gonçalo Oliveira	6–1, 6–7^{(5–7)}, [6–10]
Win	56–39	Aug 2021	Liberec, Czech Republic	Challenger	Clay	(Slovakia) Igor Zelenay	(France) Geoffrey Blancaneaux (France) Maxime Janvier	6–2, 6–7^{(6–8)}, [10–5]
Win	57–39	Oct 2021	Barcelona, Spain	Challenger	Clay	(Finland) Harri Heliövaara	(Portugal) Nuno Borges (Portugal) Francisco Cabral	6–4, 6–3
Win	58–39	Nov 2021	Eckental, Germany	Challenger	Carpet (i)	(United Kingdom) Jonny O'Mara	(Belgium) Ruben Bemelmans (Germany) Daniel Masur	6–4, 7–5
Loss	58–40	March 2022	Roseto degli Abruzzi, Italy	Challenger	Clay	(Austria) Philipp Oswald	(Monaco) Hugo Nys (Poland) Jan Zieliński	6–7^{(2–7)}, 6–4, [3–10]
Win	59–40	Mar 2022	Marbella, Spain	Challenger	Clay	(Austria) Philipp Oswald	(Monaco) Hugo Nys (Poland) Jan Zieliński	7–6^{(8–6)}, 3–6, [10–3]
Loss	59–41	May 2022	Prostějov, Czech Republic	Challenger	Clay	(Slovakia) Andrej Martin	(India) Yuki Bhambri (India) Saketh Myneni	3–6, 5–7
Loss	59–42	Jul 2022	Braunschweig, Germany	Challenger	Clay	(Czech Republic) Adam Pavlásek	(Brazil) Marcelo Demoliner (Germany) Jan-Lennard Struff	4–6, 5–7
Loss	59–43	Aug 2022	Liberec, Czech Republic	Challenger	Clay	(Czech Republic) Adam Pavlásek	(Austria) Neil Oberleitner (Austria) Philipp Oswald	6–7^{(5–7)}, 2–6
Loss	59–44	Sep 2022	Szczecin, Poland	Challenger	Clay	(Czech Republic) Adam Pavlásek	(Jamaica) Dustin Brown (Italy) Andrea Vavassori	4–6, 7–5, [8–10]
Loss	59–45	Sep 2022	Genoa, Italy	Challenger	Clay	(Czech Republic) Adam Pavlásek	(Jamaica) Dustin Brown (Italy) Andrea Vavassori	2–6, 2–6
Loss	59–46	Jan 2023	Ottignies-Louvain-la-Neuve, Belgium	Challenger	Hard (i)	(Czech Republic) Adam Pavlásek	(Monaco) Romain Arneodo (Austria) Tristan-Samuel Weissborn	4–6, 3–6
Loss	59–47	Mar 2024	Zadar, Croatia	Challenger	Clay	(Czech Republic) Zdeněk Kolář	(Czech Republic) Gregoire Jacq (France) Manuel Guinard	4–6, 4–6

== Doubles performance timeline ==
Key
W	F	SF	QF	#R	RR	Q#	DNQ	A	NH

(W) winner; (F) finalist; (SF) semifinalist; (QF) quarterfinalist; (#R) rounds 4, 3, 2, 1; (RR) round-robin stage; (Q#) qualification round; (DNQ) did not qualify; (A) absent; (NH) not held; (SR) strike rate (events won / competed); (W–L) win–loss record.
To avoid confusion and double counting, these charts are updated at the conclusion of a tournament or when the player's participation has ended.

Tournament	2017	2018	2019	2020	2021	2022	2023	SR	W–L
Grand Slam tournaments
Australian Open	A	1R	1R	1R	A	A	A	0 / 3	0–3
French Open	3R	1R	1R	A	A	1R	2R	0 / 5	3–5
Wimbledon	1R	2R	3R	NH	1R	1R		0 / 5	3–5
US Open	1R	3R	1R	A	A	A		0 / 3	2–3
Win–loss	2–3	3–4	2–4	0–1	0–1	0–2	1–1	0 / 16	8–16
Year End Ranking	59	49	64	108	87	91			
