= Andreas Siljeström =

Swedish tennis player

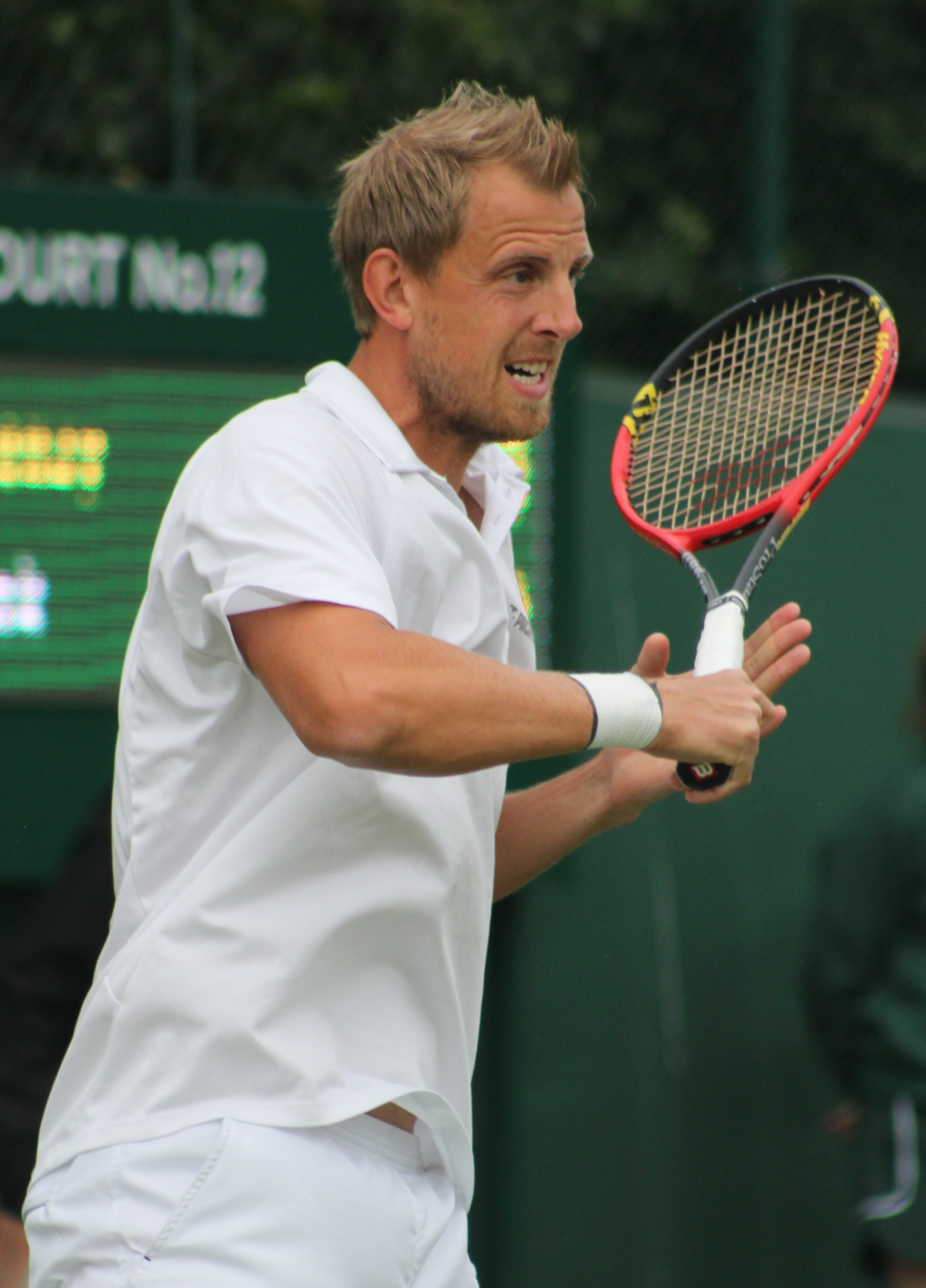
- Country (sports): Sweden
- Born: 21 July 1981 (age 44) Stockholm, Sweden
- Height: 2.06 m (6 ft 9 in)
- Turned pro: 2001
- Retired: 2019
- Plays: Right-handed (two-handed backhand)
- College: Middle Tennessee State University
- Coach: Rikard Billing
- Prize money: US$384,857

Singles
- Career record: 0–0
- Career titles: 0
- Highest ranking: No. 964 (8 March 2010)

Doubles
- Career record: 36–65
- Career titles: 0
- Highest ranking: No. 57 (14 May 2012)

Grand Slam doubles results
- Australian Open: 1R (2012, 2017)
- French Open: 1R (2012)
- Wimbledon: 2R (2017)
- US Open: 2R (2011)

Grand Slam mixed doubles results
- Wimbledon: 1R (2016)

Andreas Siljeström (born 21 July 1981) is a Swedish former professional tennis player who specialized in doubles and a pickleball player. He has a career doubles high-ranking of world No. 57 achieved on 14 May 2012 and a singles ranking of No. 964 achieved on 8 March 2010.

He is among the tallest male players on the tour; only Reilly Opelka at 2.11 metres (6 ft 11 in), Ivo Karlović at 2.11 metres (6 ft 11 in), and John Isner at 2.08 metres (6 ft 10 in) are taller than him.

== ATP career finals ==
=== Doubles: 3 (3 runners-up) ===
Legend Grand Slam tournaments (0–0) ATP World Tour Finals (0–0) ATP World Tour Masters 1000 (0–0) ATP World Tour 500 Series (0–0) ATP World Tour 250 Series (0–3)	Titles by surface Hard (0–1) Clay (0–2) Grass (0–0)	Titles by setting Outdoor (0–3) Indoor (0–0)

Result	W–L	Date	Tournament	Tier	Surface	Partner	Opponents	Score
Loss	0–1	Jul 2011	Swedish Open, Sweden	250 Series	Clay	(Sweden) Simon Aspelin	(Sweden) Robert Lindstedt (Romania) Horia Tecău	3–6, 3–6
Loss	0–2	May 2012	Serbia Open, Serbia	250 Series	Clay	(Germany) Martin Emmrich	(Israel) Jonathan Erlich (Israel) Andy Ram	6–4, 2–6, [6–10]
Loss	0–3	Aug 2016	Atlanta Open, US	250 Series	Hard	(Sweden) Johan Brunström	(Argentina) Andrés Molteni (Argentina) Horacio Zeballos	6–7^{(2–7)}, 4–6

== Challenger and Futures finals ==
=== Doubles: 54 (25–29) ===
Legend (doubles) ATP Challenger Tour (18–24) ITF Futures Tour (7–5)	Titles by surface Hard (17–13) Clay (6–13) Grass (0–1) Carpet (2–2)

Result	W–L	Date	Tournament	Tier	Surface	Partner	Opponents	Score
Win	1–0	Sep 2008	USA F24, Irvine	Futures	Hard	(Brazil) Victor-Carvalho Melo	(United States) Sheeva Parbhu (United States) Benjamin Rogers	4–6, 7–5, [10–6]
Win	2–0	Nov 2008	USA F29, Honolulu	Futures	Hard	(United States) James Ludlow	(Australia) Matt Reid (Netherlands) Igor Sijsling	6–0, 4–6, [10–4]
Win	3–0	Mar 2009	USA F6, McAllen	Futures	Hard	(United States) Ruben Gonzales	(Mexico) Luis Díaz Barriga (Mexico) Antonio Ruiz-Rosales	6–3, 6–7^{(10–12)}, [10–4]
Loss	3–1	May 2009	USA F11, Tampa	Futures	Clay	(United States) Ruben Gonzales	(Australia) Kaden Hensel (Australia) Adam Hubble	5–7, 3–6
Win	4–1	Jun 2009	Ireland F2, Dublin	Futures	Carpet	(United States) Ashwin Kumar	(France) Charles-Antoine Brézac (France) Vincent Stouff	7–5, 7–6^{(7–5)}
Loss	4–2	Jul 2009	Great Britain F8, Felixstowe	Futures	Grass	(Republic of Ireland) Tristan Farron-Mahon	(Australia) Greg Jones (Australia) Robert Smeets	2–6, 4–6
Win	5–2	Aug 2009	Finland F1, Vierumäki	Futures	Clay	(Republic of Ireland) Tristan Farron-Mahon	(Finland) Juho Paukku (Sweden) Patrik Rosenholm	6–3, 6–3
Loss	5–3	Sep 2009	Netherlands F5, Almere	Futures	Clay	(Germany) Martin Emmrich	(Netherlands) Antal van der Duim (Netherlands) Boy Westerhof	6–7^{(3–7)}, 6–7^{(6–8)}
Win	6–3	Sep 2009	Sweden F1, Lidköping	Futures	Hard (i)	(Germany) Martin Emmrich	(Sweden) Pablo Figueroa (Sweden) Rickard Holmström	1–6, 7–6^{(7–4)}, [11–9]
Win	7–3	Sep 2009	Sweden F2, Falun	Futures	Hard (i)	(Germany) Martin Emmrich	(Sweden) Carl Bergman (Sweden) Henrik Norfeldt	6–7^{(6–8)}, 6–4, [11–9]
Loss	7–4	Oct 2009	France F17, Nevers	Futures	Hard (i)	(Serbia) Vladimir Obradović	(United States) Colt Gaston (United States) Phillip Simmonds	4–6, 6–7^{(3–7)}
Win	8–4	Nov 2009	Charlottesville, USA	Challenger	Hard (i)	(Germany) Martin Emmrich	(United Kingdom) Dominic Inglot (United States) Rylan Rizza	6–4, 3–6, [11–9]
Win	9–4	Nov 2009	Knoxville, USA	Challenger	Hard (i)	(Germany) Martin Emmrich	(South Africa) Raven Klaasen (South Africa) Izak van der Merwe	7–5, 6–4
Loss	9–5	Feb 2010	Bosnia & Herzegovina F1, Sarajevo	Futures	Carpet (i)	(Germany) Martin Emmrich	(Austria) Philipp Oswald (Austria) Alexander Peya	3–6, 6–7^{(2–7)}
Loss	9–6	May 2010	Manta, Ecuador	Challenger	Hard	(Germany) Martin Emmrich	(United States) Ryler DeHeart (Canada) Pierre-Ludovic Duclos	4–6, 5–7
Loss	9–7	Aug 2010	Istanbul, Turkey	Challenger	Hard	(United States) Brian Battistone	(Czech Republic) Leoš Friedl (Serbia) Dušan Vemić	6–7^{(6–8)}, 6–7^{(3–7)}
Loss	9–8	Aug 2010	San Sebastián, Spain	Challenger	Clay	(United States) Brian Battistone	(Spain) Rubén Ramírez Hidalgo (Spain) Santiago Ventura	4–6, 6–7^{(3–7)}
Loss	9–9	Sep 2010	Genova, Italy	Challenger	Clay	(United States) Brian Battistone	(Germany) Andre Begemann (Germany) Martin Emmrich	6–1, 6–7^{(3–7)}, [7–10]
Win	10–9	Apr 2011	Saint Brieuc, France	Challenger	Clay	(Poland) Tomasz Bednarek	(France) Grégoire Burquier (France) Romain Jouan	6–4, 6–7^{(4–7)}, [14–12]
Loss	10–10	Apr 2011	Napoli, Italy	Challenger	Clay	(United States) Travis Parrott	(United States) Travis Rettenmaier (Germany) Simon Stadler	4–6, 4–6
Loss	10–11	May 2011	Alessandria, Italy	Challenger	Clay	(South Africa) Jeff Coetzee	(Austria) Martin Fischer (Austria) Philipp Oswald	7–6^{(7–5)}, 5–7, [6–10]
Win	11–11	Jul 2011	Braunschweig, Germany	Challenger	Clay	(Germany) Martin Emmrich	(France) Olivier Charroin (France) Stéphane Robert	0–6, 6–4, [10–7]
Win	12–11	Oct 2011	Rennes, France	Challenger	Carpet (i)	(Germany) Martin Emmrich	(France) Kenny de Schepper (France) Édouard Roger-Vasselin	6–4, 6–4
Loss	12–12	Nov 2011	Champaign-Urbana, USA	Challenger	Hard (i)	(Germany) Martin Emmrich	(South Africa) Rik de Voest (South Africa) Izak van der Merwe	6–2, 3–6, [4–10]
Win	13–12	Nov 2011	Helsinki, Finland	Challenger	Hard (i)	(Germany) Martin Emmrich	(United States) James Cerretani (Slovakia) Michal Mertiňák	6–4, 6–4
Win	14–12	Apr 2012	Tallahassee, USA	Challenger	Hard	(Germany) Martin Emmrich	(New Zealand) Artem Sitak (United States) Blake Strode	6–2, 7–6^{(7–4)}
Loss	14–13	Apr 2012	Sarasota, USA	Challenger	Clay	(Germany) Martin Emmrich	(Sweden) Johan Brunström (South Africa) Izak van der Merwe	4–6, 1–6
Loss	14–14	Oct 2012	Tiburon, USA	Challenger	Hard	(Australia) Jordan Kerr	(South Africa) Rik de Voest (Australia) Chris Guccione	1–6, 4–6
Loss	14–15	Nov 2012	Eckental, Germany	Challenger	Carpet (i)	(Poland) Tomasz Bednarek	(United States) James Cerretani (Canada) Adil Shamasdin	3–6, 6–2, [4–10]
Win	15–15	Nov 2012	Tyumen, Russia	Challenger	Hard (i)	(Slovakia) Ivo Klec	(Russia) Konstantin Kravchuk (Ukraine) Denys Molchanov	6–3, 6–2
Loss	15–16	Jan 2013	Heilbronn, Germany	Challenger	Hard (i)	(Australia) Jordan Kerr	(Sweden) Johan Brunström (South Africa) Raven Klaasen	3–6, 6–0, [10–12]
Win	16–16	Apr 2013	Saint Brieuc, France	Challenger	Hard (i)	(Poland) Tomasz Bednarek	(Netherlands) Jesse Huta Galung (Russia) Konstantin Kravchuk	6–3, 4–6, [10–7]
Loss	16–17	May 2013	Tunis, Tunisia	Challenger	Clay	(United Kingdom) Jamie Delgado	(Germany) Dominik Meffert (Austria) Philipp Oswald	6–3, 6–7^{(0–7)}, [7–10]
Loss	16–18	Jul 2013	Braunschweig, Germany	Challenger	Clay	(Slovakia) Igor Zelenay	(Poland) Tomasz Bednarek (Poland) Mateusz Kowalczyk	2–6, 6–7^{(4–7)}
Win	17–18	Nov 2013	Bratislava, Slovakia	Challenger	Hard (i)	(Finland) Henri Kontinen	(Germany) Gero Kretschmer (Germany) Jan-Lennard Struff	7–6^{(8–6)}, 6–2
Win	18–18	Nov 2013	Andria, Italy	Challenger	Hard (i)	(Austria) Philipp Oswald	(Italy) Alessandro Motti (Serbia) Goran Tošić	6–2, 6–3
Win	19–18	Jul 2014	Braunschweig, Germany	Challenger	Clay	(Slovakia) Igor Zelenay	(Australia) Rameez Junaid (Slovakia) Michal Mertiňák	7–5, 6–4
Loss	19–19	Sep 2014	Orléans, France	Challenger	Hard (i)	(United States) James Cerretani	(Brazil) Thomaz Bellucci (Brazil) André Sá	7–5, 4–6, [8–10]
Loss	19–20	Nov 2014	Andria, Italy	Challenger	Hard (i)	(Czech Republic) Roman Jebavý	(Romania) Patrick Grigoriu (Romania) Costin Pavăl	6–7^{(4–7)}, 7–6^{(7–4)}, [5–10]
Win	20–20	Feb 2015	Bergamo, Italy	Challenger	Hard (i)	(Germany) Martin Emmrich	(Poland) Mateusz Kowalczyk (Poland) Błażej Koniusz	6–4, 7–5
Loss	20–21	Mar 2015	Quimper, France	Challenger	Hard (i)	(Germany) Martin Emmrich	(Italy) Flavio Cipolla (Germany) Dominik Meffert	6–3, 6–7^{(5–7)}, [8–10]
Loss	20–22	Aug 2015	Segovia, Spain	Challenger	Hard	(Belarus) Aliaksandr Bury	(Russia) Alexander Kudryavtsev (Ukraine) Denys Molchanov	2–6, 4–6
Loss	20–23	Aug 2015	Portorož, Slovenia	Challenger	Hard	(Belarus) Aliaksandr Bury	(France) Fabrice Martin (India) Purav Raja	6–7^{(5–7)}, 6–4, [16–18]
Loss	20–24	Nov 2015	Mouilleron le Captif, France	Challenger	Hard (i)	(Belarus) Aliaksandr Bury	(Netherlands) Sander Arends (Poland) Adam Majchrowicz	3–6, 7–5, [8–10]
Win	21–24	Jan 2016	Bangkok, Thailand	Challenger	Hard	(Sweden) Johan Brunström	(Germany) Gero Kretschmer (Germany) Alexander Satschko	6–3, 6–4
Win	22–24	Apr 2016	Saint Brieuc, France	Challenger	Hard (i)	(Australia) Rameez Junaid	(United States) James Cerretani (Netherlands) Antal van der Duim	5–7, 7–6^{(7–4)}, [10–8]
Win	23–24	Apr 2016	Barletta, Italy	Challenger	Clay	(Sweden) Johan Brunström	(Italy) Flavio Cipolla (Brazil) Rogério Dutra Silva	0–6, 6–4, [10–8]
Win	24–24	May 2016	Bordeaux, France	Challenger	Clay	(Sweden) Johan Brunström	(Argentina) Guillermo Durán (Argentina) Máximo González	6–1, 3–6, [10–4]
Loss	24–25	Jul 2016	Båstad, Sweden	Challenger	Clay	(Sweden) Johan Brunström	(Sweden) Isak Arvidsson (Sweden) Fred Simonsson	3–6, 5–7
Loss	24–26	Sep 2016	Szczecin, Poland	Challenger	Clay	(Sweden) Johan Brunström	(Germany) Andre Begemann (Belarus) Aliaksandr Bury	6–7^{(3–7)}, 7–6^{(9–7)}, [4–10]
Win	25–26	Oct 2016	Budapest, Hungary	Challenger	Hard (i)	(Belarus) Aliaksandr Bury	(United States) James Cerretani (Austria) Philipp Oswald	7–6^{(7–3)}, 6–4
Loss	25–27	Nov 2016	Mouilleron le Captif, France	Challenger	Hard (i)	(Sweden) Johan Brunström	(France) Jonathan Eysseric (France) Édouard Roger-Vasselin	7–6^{(7–1)}, 6–7^{(3–7)}, [9–11]
Loss	25–28	Sep 2017	Szczecin, Poland	Challenger	Clay	(Belarus) Aliaksandr Bury	(Netherlands) Wesley Koolhof (New Zealand) Artem Sitak	1–6, 5–7
Loss	25–29	Jun 2019	Blois, France	Challenger	Clay	(Peru) Sergio Galdós	(France) Corentin Denolly (France) Alexandre Müller	5–7, 7–6^{(7–5)}, [6–10]

== Doubles performance timeline ==
Key
W	F	SF	QF	#R	RR	Q#	DNQ	A	NH

(W) winner; (F) finalist; (SF) semifinalist; (QF) quarterfinalist; (#R) rounds 4, 3, 2, 1; (RR) round-robin stage; (Q#) qualification round; (DNQ) did not qualify; (A) absent; (NH) not held; (SR) strike rate (events won / competed); (W–L) win–loss record.
To avoid confusion and double counting, these charts are updated at the conclusion of a tournament or when the player's participation has ended.

Tournament	2008	2009	2010	2011	2012	2013	2014	2015	2016	2017	2018	SR	W–L
Grand Slam tournaments
Australian Open	A	A	A	A	1R	A	A	A	A	1R		0 / 2	0–2
French Open	A	A	A	A	1R	A	A	A	A	A		0 / 1	0–1
Wimbledon	A	A	A	Q1	A	1R	1R	Q1	1R	2R		0 / 4	1–4
US Open	A	A	A	2R	A	A	A	A	A	A	1R	0 / 2	1–1
Win–loss	0–0	0–0	0–0	1–1	0–2	0–1	0–1	0–0	0–1	1–2	0–1	0 / 8	2–8
Career statistics
Titles / Finals	0 / 0	0 / 0	0 / 0	0 / 1	0 / 1	0 / 0	0 / 0	0 / 0	0 / 1	0 / 0		0 / 3	
Overall win–loss	0–0	0–1	1–5	5–7	4–9	1–3	2–4	6–8	11–13	3–8		33–58	
Year-end ranking	779	167	133	70	107	105	99	96	64			36%	
