= Patrick Grigoriu =

Romanian tennis player

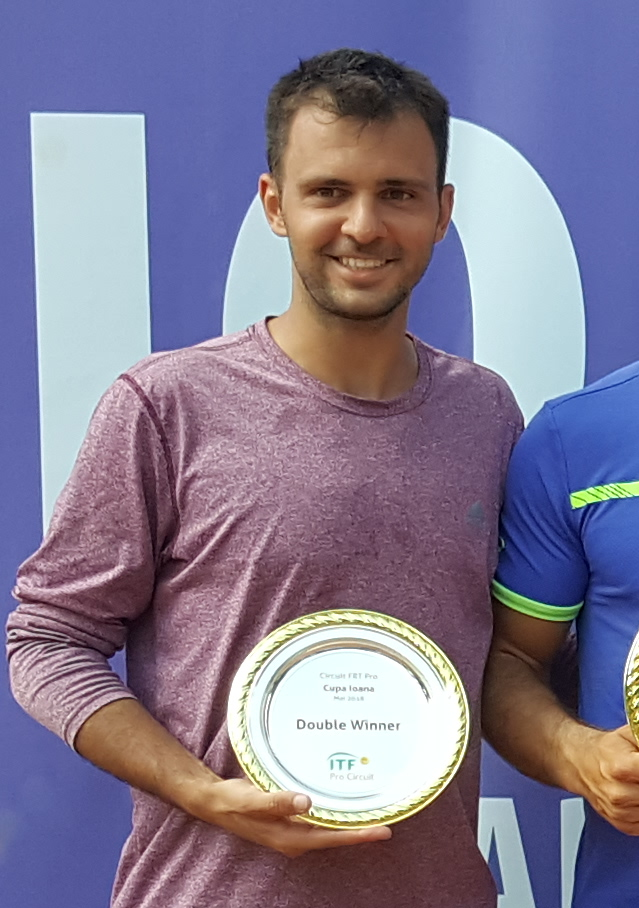
- Patrick Grigoriu in 2018
- Full name: Patrick Grigoriu
- Country (sports): Romania
- Born: 25 March 1991 (age 34) Bucharest, Romania
- Plays: Left-handed (two handed-backhand)
- Prize money: $36,877

Singles
- Career titles: 0
- Highest ranking: No. 1496 (15 August 2011)

Doubles
- Career titles: 1 Challenger, 3 ITF
- Highest ranking: No. 186 (17 November 2014)

Patrick Grigoriu (born 25 March 1991, in Bucharest) is a Romanian tennis player.

Grigoriu has a career high ATP singles ranking of No. 1,496 achieved on 15 August 2011 and a career high ATP doubles ranking of No. 186 achieved on 17 November 2014.

Grigoriu won his first ATP Challenger Tour doubles title at the 2014 Internazionali di Tennis Castel del Monte, partnering Costin Pavăl, defeating Roman Jebavý and Andreas Siljeström in the final, 7–6^{(7–4)}, 6–7^{(4–7)}, [10–5].
