= Internazionali di Tennis Castel del Monte =

ATP Challenger Tour
- Location: Andria, Italy
- Venue: Palazzetto dello Sport
- Category: ATP Challenger Tour
- Surface: Carpet / Indoor
- Draw: 32S/16Q/16D
- Prize money: € 35,000
- Website: website

The Internazionali di Tennis Castel del Monte was a tennis tournament held in Andria, Italy from 2013 to 2018, and in 2022. The event is part of the ATP Challenger Tour and was played on indoor carpet courts.

== Past finals ==
=== Singles ===
| Year | Champion | Runner-up | Score |
|---|---|---|---|
| 2022 | (Switzerland) Leandro Riedi | (Kazakhstan) Mikhail Kukushkin | 7–6^{(7–4)}, 6–3 |
| 2019–21 | Not held | | |
| 2018 | (France) Ugo Humbert | (Italy) Filippo Baldi | 6–4, 7–6^{(7–3)} |
| 2017 | (Belarus) Uladzimir Ignatik | (Belgium) Christopher Heyman | 6–7^{(3–7)}, 6–4, 7–6^{(7–3)} |
| 2016 | (Italy) Luca Vanni | (Italy) Matteo Berrettini | 5–7, 6–0, 6–3 |
| 2015 | (Croatia) Ivan Dodig | (Germany) Michael Berrer | 6–2, 6–1 |
| 2014 | (Lithuania) Ričardas Berankis | (Georgia (country)) Nikoloz Basilashvili | 6–4, 1–0, ret. |
| 2013 | (Hungary) Márton Fucsovics | (Germany) Dustin Brown | 6–3, 6–4 |

=== Doubles ===
| Year | Champions | Runners-up | Score |
|---|---|---|---|
| 2022 | (United Kingdom) Julian Cash (United Kingdom) Henry Patten | (Italy) Francesco Forti (Italy) Marcello Serafini | 6–7^{(3–7)}, 6–4, [10–4] |
| 2019–21 | Not held | | |
| 2018 | (Poland) Karol Drzewiecki (Poland) Szymon Walków | (Switzerland) Marc-Andrea Hüsler (Netherlands) David Pel | 7–6^{(12–10)}, 2–6, [11–9] |
| 2017 | (Italy) Lorenzo Sonego (Italy) Andrea Vavassori | (Netherlands) Sander Arends (Belgium) Sander Gillé | 6–3, 3–6, [10–7] |
| 2016 | (Netherlands) Wesley Koolhof (Netherlands) Matwé Middelkoop | (Czech Republic) Roman Jebavý (Czech Republic) Zdeněk Kolář | 6–3, 6–3 |
| 2015 | (Switzerland) Marco Chiudinelli (Germany) Frank Moser | (Australia) Carsten Ball (Germany) Dustin Brown | 7–6^{(7–5)}, 7–5 |
| 2014 | (Romania) Patrick Grigoriu (Romania) Costin Pavăl | (Czech Republic) Roman Jebavý (Sweden) Andreas Siljeström | 7–6^{(7–4)}, 6–7^{(4–7)}, [10–5] |
| 2013 | (Austria) Philipp Oswald (Sweden) Andreas Siljeström | (Italy) Alessandro Motti (Croatia) Goran Tošić | 6–3, 6–2 |
