= Alessandro Bega =

Italian tennis coach and former tennis player (born 1991)

- Country (sports): Italy
- Born: 11 January 1991 (age 35) Cernusco sul Naviglio, Italy
- Height: 1.73 m (5 ft 8 in)
- Retired: December 2021
- Plays: Right-handed (two-handed backhand)
- Prize money: $222,784

Singles
- Career record: 0–1
- Highest ranking: No. 259 (25 July 2016)

Doubles
- Highest ranking: No. 369 (8 August 2016)
- Last updated on: 1 July 2024.

Alessandro Bega (born 11 January 1991) is an Italian tennis coach and a former professional player. He predominantly competed on the ITF Futures and ATP Challenger Tour. Bega has a career-high ATP singles ranking by the ATP of No. 259, achieved on 25 July 2016. He also has a career-high doubles ranking of No. 369, achieved on 8 August 2016.

Bega has reached 34 career singles finals, consisting of 17 wins and 17 losses, all coming at the ITF Futures level. Additionally, he has a reached 23 career doubles finals, consisting of 9 wins and 14 losses, all coming at the ITF Futures level.

== Professional career ==
Bega made his ATP Tour main-draw debut at the 2017 Citi Open after the qualifying rounds by defeating Danny Thomas 7–6^{(3)}, 6–3 and João Pedro Sorgi 6–4, 6–4. He was defeated in the first round by Tunisia's Malek Jaziri in straight sets 7–5, 7–5. To date, this is the only main-draw appearance he has made in either singles or doubles matches.

== Coaching career ==
Since 2024 Bega is the coach of fellow countryman Matteo Berrettini alongside Francisco Roig in 2024, and then Thomas Enqvist who officially joined the team in 2026.

== ATP Challenger and ITF Futures finals ==
=== Singles: 34 (17–17) ===
Legend ATP Challenger (0–0) ITF Futures (17–17)	Finals by surface Hard (15–15) Clay (1–2)

Result	W–L	Date	Tournament	Tier	Surface	Opponent	Score
Win	1–0	Sep 2012	Kuwait F1, Meshref	Futures	Hard	(United States) Sean Berman	7–5, 6–4
Loss	1–1	Nov 2012	Burundi F1, Bujumbura	Futures	Clay	(Austria) Gerald Melzer	2–6, 3–6
Loss	1–2	Jun 2013	Turkey F22, Konya	Futures	Hard	(Argentina) Maximiliano Estévez	6–7^{(2-7)}, 2–6
Win	2–2	Sep 2013	Greece F10, Filippiada	Futures	Hard	(Greece) Alexandros Jakupovic	4–6, 6–1, 6–4
Loss	2–3	Oct 2014	Egypt F28, Sharm El Sheikh	Futures	Hard	(Bosnia and Herzegovina) Aldin Šetkić	1–6, 4–6
Win	3–3	Nov 2014	Tunisia F6, Sousse	Futures	Hard	(Belgium) Germain Gigounon	6–1, 6–2
Loss	3–4	Dec 2014	Tunisia F10, Sousse	Futures	Hard	(Italy) Omar Giacalone	5–7, 4–6
Loss	3–5	May 2015	Greece F6, Heraklion	Futures	Hard	(Italy) Erik Crepaldi	2–6, 2–6
Win	4–5	Jun 2015	Turkey F22, Bursa	Futures	Hard	(Ukraine) Denys Mylokostov	6–3, 6–9
Win	5–5	Aug 2015	Egypt F24, Sharm El Sheikh	Futures	Hard	(Italy) Riccardo Bonadio	6–2, 7–5
Loss	5–7	Sep 2015	Egypt F29, Sharm El Sheikh	Futures	Hard	(Czech Republic) Libor Salaba	2–6, 6–1, 3–6
Win	6–7	Nov 2015	Kuwait F2, Meshref	Futures	Hard	(Germany) Peter Heller	6–3, 6–4
Loss	6–8	Dec 2015	Egypt F43, Sharm El Sheikh	Futures	Hard	(Serbia) Marko Tepavac	3–6, 4–6
Win	7–8	Apr 2016	Italy F4, San Carlo Canavese	Futures	Hard	(France) Rémi Boutillier	6–4, 1–6, 6–4
Loss	7–9	Jul 2016	Egypt F13, Sharm El Sheikh	Futures	Hard	(Bosnia and Herzegovina) Aldin Šetkić	5–7, 4–6
Loss	7–10	Nov 2016	South Africa F1, Stellenbosch	Futures	Hard	(South Africa) Lloyd Harris	4–6, 4–6
Win	8–10	Mar 2017	Italy F3, Basiglio	Futures	Hard	(Croatia) Viktor Galović	3–6, 6–3, 6–4
Win	9–10	Aug 2017	Turkey F30, Istanbul	Futures	Clay	(Chinese Taipei) Yang Tsung-hua	7–6^{(7-3)}, 3–6, 7–5
Loss	9–11	Nov 2017	Kuwait F1, Meshref	Futures	Hard	(Austria) Maximilian Neuchrist	6–7^{(4-7)}, 3–6
Win	10–11	Jan 2018	France F3, Veigy-Foncenex	Futures	Carpet	(Netherlands) Antal van der Duim	4–6, 6–4, 7–6^{(9-7)}
Loss	10–12	Mar 2018	Israel F1, Ramat Gan	Futures	Hard	(Czech Republic) David Poljak	5–7, 4–6
Win	11–12	Apr 2018	Egypt F14, Sharm El Sheikh	Futures	Hard	(Czech Republic) David Poljak	6–4, 6–3
Win	12–12	Apr 2018	Israel F4, Ramat HaSharon	Futures	Hard	(Ukraine) Marat Deviatiarov	6–3, 6–1
Loss	12–13	Jun 2018	Israel F9, Netanya	Futures	Hard	(Israel) Edan Leshem	2–6, 1–6
Loss	12–14	Oct 2018	Egypt F21, Sharm El Sheikh	Futures	Hard	(Spain) David Pérez Sanz	3–6, 6–3, 5–7
Loss	12–15	Oct 2018	Tunisia F36, Monastir	Futures	Hard	(United Kingdom) Jonathan Gray	6–7^{(4–7)}, 4–6
Win	13–15	Aug 2019	Israel M15, Kiryat Shmona	World Tennis Tour	Hard	(Ukraine) Marat Deviatiarov	6–2, 1–6, 6–4
Loss	13–16	Oct 2019	Egypt M15, Sharm El Sheikh	World Tennis Tour	Hard	(Czech Republic) Marek Gengel	2–6, 7–5, 1–6
Win	14–16	Jan 2020	Mexico M15, Cancún	World Tennis Tour	Hard	(Brazil) Mateus Alves	6–4, 6–2
Win	15–16	Feb 2020	Egypt M15, Sharm El Sheikh	World Tennis Tour	Hard	(Czech Republic) Marek Gengel	6–4, 6–2
Win	16–16	Feb 2020	Egypt M15, Sharm El Sheikh	World Tennis Tour	Hard	(Czech Republic) Marek Gengel	6–4, 7–5
Loss	16–17	Sep 2020	Switzerland M15, Caslano	World Tennis Tour	Clay	(Switzerland) Sandro Ehrat	4–6, 2–6
Win	17–17	Nov 2020	Egypt M15, Sharm El Sheikh	World Tennis Tour	Hard	(Cyprus) Petros Chrysochos	6–4, 6–2

=== Doubles: 23 (9–14) ===
Legend ATP Challenger (0–0) ITF Futures (9–14)	Finals by surface Hard (5–11) Clay (3–3) Carpet (1–0)

Result	W–L	Date	Tournament	Tier	Surface	Partner	Opponents	Score
Loss	0–1	Oct 2010	Italy F29, Naples	Futures	Hard	(Italy) Riccardo Sinicropi	(Italy) Erik Crepaldi (Italy) Claudio Grassi	4–6, 4–6
Win	1–1	Oct 2011	Italy F30, Naples	Futures	Carpet	(Italy) Riccardo Sinicropi	(Italy) Matteo Volante (Italy) Marco Crugnola	7–6^{(7–4)}, 7–6^{(7–4)}
Win	2–1	Nov 2011	Burundi F1, Bujumbura	Futures	Clay	(Italy) Riccardo Sinicropi	(Italy) Emanuele Molina (Italy) D. Della Tommasina	6–1, 6–2
Win	3–1	Aug 2012	Turkey F31, İzmir	Futures	Clay	(Italy) Riccardo Sinicropi	(Ukraine) Vladyslav Manafov (Russia) Vitali Reshetnikov	6–4, 7–5
Loss	3–2	Aug 2012	Turkey F32, İzmir	Futures	Clay	(Italy) Riccardo Sinicropi	(Ukraine) Vladyslav Manafov (Greece) A. Jakupovic	4–6, 6–7^{(4–7)}, [10–12]
Loss	3–3	Sep 2012	Kuwait F1, Meshref	Futures	Hard	(Czech Republic) Jan Blecha	(Kuwait) Mohammad Ghareeb (Russia) Mikhail Vasiliev	6–3, 6–7^{(5–7)}, [7–10]
Loss	3–4	Oct 2012	Nigeria F1, Lagos	Futures	Hard	(Spain) Enrique Lopez-Perez	(Slovakia) Kamil Čapkovič (South Africa) Ruan Roelofse	4–6, 2–6
Loss	3–5	Oct 2012	Nigeria F2, Lagos	Futures	Hard	(Spain) Enrique Lopez-Perez	(Slovakia) Kamil Čapkovič (South Africa) Ruan Roelofse	1–6, 2–6
Loss	3–6	Nov 2012	Burundi F1, Bujumbura	Futures	Clay	(Italy) Riccardo Sinicropi	(Austria) Lukas Jastraunig (Netherlands) Mark Vervoort	4–6, 6–3, [8–10]
Loss	3–7	Aug 2013	Italy F19, La Spezia	Futures	Clay	(Italy) Riccardo Sinicropi	(Italy) Daniele Giorgini (Italy) Walter Trusendi	5–7, 2–6
Loss	3–8	Aug 2014	Italy F29, Piombino	Futures	Hard	(Italy) D. Della Tommasina	(Italy) Francesco Borgo (Italy) Claudio Grassi	6–3, 3–6, [6–10]
Win	4–8	Dec 2014	Tunisia F10, Sousse	Futures	Hard	(Italy) Francesco Vilardo	(United Kingdom) Andrew Bettles (United Kingdom) Evan Hoyt	7–6^{(7–2)}, 6–3
Win	5–8	Jun 2015	Turkey F22, Bursa	Futures	Hard	(Italy) Davide Melchiorre	(Turkey) Altuğ Çelikbilek (Turkey) Sefa Suluogl	4–6, 7–5, [10–3]
Win	6–8	Jul 2015	Turkey F28, Ankara	Futures	Clay	(Italy) Francesco Vilardo	(Turkey) Altuğ Çelikbilek (Turkey) Tuna Altuna	6–4, 6–3
Loss	6–9	Aug 2015	Egypt F25, Sharm El Sheikh	Futures	Hard	(Italy) Francesco Vilardo	(Italy) Riccardo Bonadio (Italy) Tommaso Lago	6–4, 4–6, [7–10]
Loss	6–10	Nov 2015	Kuwait F1, Meshref	Futures	Hard	(Italy) Francesco Vilardo	(Spain) S. Martos-Gornes (Spain) Pol Toledo Bagué	3–6, 0–6
Loss	6–11	May 2016	Turkey F17, Antalya	Futures	Hard	(Italy) Lorenzo Frigerio	(Germany) Marc Sieber (Germany) Christoph Negritu	4–6, 7–6^{(7–1)}, [10–12]
Loss	6–12	Jul 2016	Egypt F13, Sharm El Sheikh	Futures	Hard	(Italy) Francesco Vilardo	(United States) Jarmere Jenkins (United States) Anderson Reed	3–6, 3–6
Win	7–12	Nov 2016	South Africa F1, Stellenbosch	Futures	Hard	(Switzerland) Luca Margaroli	(South Africa) Nicolaas Scholtz (South Africa) Chris Haggard	7–5, 6–2
Loss	7–13	May 2017	Nigeria F1, Abuja	Futures	Hard	(Norway) Viktor Durasovic	(Brazil) Fabiano de Paula (Brazil) Fernando Romboli	4–6, 7–6^{(7–5)}, [7–10]
Win	8–13	May 2017	Nigeria F2, Abuja	Futures	Hard	(Norway) Viktor Durasovic	(Brazil) Sylvester Emmanuel (France) Calvin Hemery	6–4, 6–0
Win	9–13	Oct 2019	Egypt M15, Sharm El Sheikh	World Tennis Tour	Hard	(Italy) Jacopo Berrettini	(Russia) Boris Pokotilov (France) Arthur Bernabe	7–6^{(7-5)}, 6–2
Loss	9–14	Nov 2020	Egypt M15, Sharm El Sheikh	World Tennis Tour	Hard	(Cyprus) Petros Chrysochos	(Serbia) Miljan Zekić (Serbia) Marko Miladinović	4–6, 3–2
