= 2018 Hungarian Challenger Open =

- Date: 5–11 February
- Edition: 3rd
- Surface: Hard (indoor)
- Location: Budapest, Hungary

Champions

Singles
- (Canada) Vasek Pospisil

Doubles
- (Canada) Félix Auger-Aliassime / (Spain) Nicola Kuhn
← 2017 ·	Hungarian Challenger Open	· 2019 →

The 2018 Hungarian Challenger Open was a professional tennis tournament played on indoor hard courts. It was the third edition of the tournament and was a part of the 2018 ATP Challenger Tour. It took place in Budapest, Hungary between 5 and 11 February 2018.

== Singles main-draw entrants ==
=== Seeds ===
Country	Player	Rank^{1}	Seed
HUN	Márton Fucsovics	63	1
CAN	Vasek Pospisil	85	2
FRA	Quentin Halys	119	3
SWE	Elias Ymer	135	4
CAN	Félix Auger-Aliassime	163	5
EST	Jürgen Zopp	171	6
CRO	Viktor Galović	181	7
SRB	Nikola Milojević	183	8

- ^{1} Rankings are as of January 29, 2018.

=== Other entrants ===
The following players received wildcards into the singles main draw:

- (Hungary) Gábor Borsos
- (Hungary) Péter Nagy
- (Hungary) Zsombor Piros
- (Hungary) Máté Valkusz

The following player received entry into the singles main draw as an alternate:

- (Spain) Nicola Kuhn

The following players received entry from the qualifying draw:

- (Germany) Jeremy Jahn
- (Germany) Kevin Krawietz
- (France) Constant Lestienne
- (Italy) Andrea Pellegrino

== Champions ==
=== Singles ===
- (Canada) Vasek Pospisil def. (Spain) Nicola Kuhn 7–6^{(7–3)}, 3–6, 6–3.

=== Doubles ===
- (Canada) Félix Auger-Aliassime / (Spain) Nicola Kuhn def. (Croatia) Marin Draganja / (Croatia) Tomislav Draganja 2–6, 6–2, [11–9].
