= 2016 WHB Hungarian Open – Doubles =

Doubles
- 2016 WHB Hungarian Open

Final
- Champions: (Belarus) Aliaksandr Bury (Sweden) Andreas Siljeström
- Runners-up: (United States) James Cerretani (Austria) Philipp Oswald
- Score: 7–6^{(7–3)}, 6–4

Events
Singles	Doubles
WHB Hungarian Open	· 2017 →

This was the first edition of the tournament.

Aliaksandr Bury and Andreas Siljeström won the title after defeating James Cerretani and Philipp Oswald 7–6^{(7–3)}, 6–4 in the final.

== Seeds ==
1. (Netherlands) Wesley Koolhof / (Netherlands) Matwé Middelkoop (quarterfinals)
2. (Brazil) André Sá / (United Kingdom) Neal Skupski (first round)
3. (Belarus) Aliaksandr Bury / (Sweden) Andreas Siljeström (champions)
4. (United States) James Cerretani / (Austria) Philipp Oswald (final)

== Draw ==
=== Key ===
- Q = Qualifier
- WC = Wild card
- LL = Lucky loser
- Alt = Alternate
- SE = Special exempt
- PR = Protected ranking
- ITF = ITF entry
- JE = Junior exempt
- w/o = Walkover
- r = Retired
- d = Defaulted
- SR = Special ranking

First round
1	(Netherlands) W Koolhof (Netherlands) M Middelkoop	6	6
WC	(Hungary) M Fucsovics (Hungary) L Gödry	2	2
(Ukraine) D Molchanov (Slovakia) I Zelenay	6	7^{7}
(Croatia) M Draganja (Croatia) A Šančić	4	6^{4}
4	(United States) J Cerretani (Austria) P Oswald	4	6	[12]
(Italy) T Fabbiano (Italy) L Vanni	6	4	[10]
(Netherlands) S Arends (Poland) M Kowalczyk	3	3
(Croatia) N Mektić (Croatia) F Škugor	6	6
(Belgium) S Darcis (Italy) A Motti	6	6
(Italy) R Ghedin (Netherlands) M Vervoort	2	4
(France) Q Halys (France) T Lamasine	4	1
3	(Belarus) A Bury (Sweden) A Siljeström	6	6
WC	(Hungary) G Kisgyörgy (Hungary) P Nagy	6	1	[2]
(Germany) G Kretschmer (Belarus) A Vasilevski	2	6	[10]
WC	(Hungary) G Borsos (Spain) T Robredo	3	6	[10]
2	(Brazil) A Sá (United Kingdom) N Skupski	6	2	[5]

Quarterfinals
1	(Netherlands) W Koolhof (Netherlands) M Middelkoop	6^{10}	2
(Ukraine) D Molchanov (Slovakia) I Zelenay	7^{12}	6
4	(United States) J Cerretani (Austria) P Oswald	6	6
(Croatia) N Mektić (Croatia) F Škugor	2	3
(Belgium) S Darcis (Italy) A Motti	3	6^{3}
3	(Belarus) A Bury (Sweden) A Siljeström	6	7^{7}
(Germany) G Kretschmer (Belarus) A Vasilevski	6^{5}	6	[10]
WC	(Hungary) G Borsos (Spain) T Robredo	7^{7}	3	[5]

Semifinals
(Ukraine) D Molchanov (Slovakia) I Zelenay	3	2
4	(United States) J Cerretani (Austria) P Oswald	6	6
3	(Belarus) A Bury (Sweden) A Siljeström	7	6
(Germany) G Kretschmer (Belarus) A Vasilevski	5	1

Final
4	(United States) J Cerretani (Austria) P Oswald	6^{3}	4
3	(Belarus) A Bury (Sweden) A Siljeström	7^{7}	6
