= 2017 Hungarian Challenger Open – Doubles =

Doubles
- 2017 Hungarian Challenger Open

Final
- Champions: (Croatia) Dino Marcan (Austria) Tristan-Samuel Weissborn
- Runners-up: (Slovenia) Blaž Kavčič (Croatia) Franko Škugor
- Score: 6–3, 3–6, [16–14]

Events
Singles	Doubles
← 2016 ·	Hungarian Challenger Open	· 2018 →

Aliaksandr Bury and Andreas Siljeström were the defending champions but chose not to defend their title.

Dino Marcan and Tristan-Samuel Weissborn won the title after defeating Blaž Kavčič and Franko Škugor 6–3, 3–6, [16–14] in the final.

== Seeds ==
1. (Austria) Julian Knowle / (Austria) Jürgen Melzer (semifinals)
2. (Czech Republic) Roman Jebavý / (Slovakia) Igor Zelenay (quarterfinals)
3. (Croatia) Dino Marcan / (Austria) Tristan-Samuel Weissborn (champions)
4. (Germany) Kevin Krawietz / (Germany) Gero Kretschmer (quarterfinals)

== Draw ==
=== Key ===
- Q = Qualifier
- WC = Wild card
- LL = Lucky loser
- Alt = Alternate
- SE = Special exempt
- PR = Protected ranking
- ITF = ITF entry
- JE = Junior exempt
- w/o = Walkover
- r = Retired
- d = Defaulted
- SR = Special ranking

First round
1	(Austria) J Knowle (Austria) J Melzer	6	6
(Kazakhstan) A Golubev (Chinese Taipei) H-y Peng	3	4
(Belgium) Y Reuter (Netherlands) M Vervoort	7^{7}	2	[6]
(Italy) L Giustino (Croatia) N Serdarušić	6^{3}	6	[10]
4	(Germany) K Krawietz (Germany) G Kretschmer	2	6	[11]
(Croatia) M Draganja (Croatia) T Draganja	6	4	[9]
(Poland) T Bednarek (Belgium) J Vliegen	4	6^{4}
(Slovenia) B Kavčič (Croatia) F Škugor	6	7^{7}
(Italy) A Motti (Italy) L Vanni	1	4
(Italy) T Fabbiano (Australia) R Junaid	6	6
(Russia) E Donskoy (Russia) D Matsukevich	6	2	[8]
3	(Croatia) D Marcan (Austria) T-S Weissborn	4	6	[10]
WC	(Bosnia and Herzegovina) M Bašić (Hungary) G Borsos	7^{7}	6
WC	(Hungary) M Fucsovics (Hungary) L Gödry	6^{2}	1
WC	(Hungary) A Balázs (Hungary) G Kisgyörgy	6^{4}	0
2	(Czech Republic) R Jebavý (Slovakia) I Zelenay	7^{7}	6

Quarterfinals
1	(Austria) J Knowle (Austria) J Melzer	6	6
(Italy) L Giustino (Croatia) N Serdarušić	1	2
4	(Germany) K Krawietz (Germany) G Kretschmer	6	1	[8]
(Slovenia) B Kavčič (Croatia) F Škugor	2	6	[10]
(Italy) T Fabbiano (Australia) R Junaid	2	6	[4]
3	(Croatia) D Marcan (Austria) T-S Weissborn	6	3	[10]
WC	(Bosnia and Herzegovina) M Bašić (Hungary) G Borsos	0	7^{9}	[10]
2	(Czech Republic) R Jebavý (Slovakia) I Zelenay	6	6^{7}	[3]

Semifinals
1	(Austria) J Knowle (Austria) J Melzer	3	1
(Slovenia) B Kavčič (Croatia) F Škugor	6	6
3	(Croatia) D Marcan (Austria) T-S Weissborn	7	6
WC	(Bosnia and Herzegovina) M Bašić (Hungary) G Borsos	5	3

Final
(Slovenia) B Kavčič (Croatia) F Škugor	3	6	[14]
3	(Croatia) D Marcan (Austria) T-S Weissborn	6	3	[16]
