= 2020 Bendigo Challenger =

- Date: 12–18 January 2020
- Edition: 1st (men)
- Category: ATP Challenger Tour
- Draw: 48S / 16D
- Surface: Hard
- Location: Bendigo, Australia

Champions

Singles
- (United States) Steve Johnson

Doubles
- (Serbia) Nikola Ćaćić / (Ukraine) Denys Molchanov
- Bendigo Challenger

The 2020 Bendigo Challenger was a professional tennis tournament played on hard courts. It was the first edition of the tournament which was a part of the 2020 ATP Challenger Tour. It took place in Bendigo, Australia between 12 and 18 January 2020.

== Singles main-draw entrants ==
=== Seeds ===
Country	Player	Rank^{1}	Seed
HUN	Márton Fucsovics	70	1
ESP	Roberto Carballés Baena	80	2
ITA	Stefano Travaglia	82	3
USA	Steve Johnson	84	4
BIH	Damir Džumhur	91	5
BLR	Egor Gerasimov	98	6
USA	Marcos Giron	107	7
AUS	Christopher O'Connell	117	8
FRA	Hugo Gaston	246	9
JPN	Yosuke Watanuki	261	10
IND	Sasikumar Mukund	266	11
FRA	Hugo Grenier	267	12
CHI	Marcelo Tomás Barrios Vera	333	13
RUS	Konstantin Kravchuk	339	14
ESA	Marcelo Arévalo	351	15
AUS	Maverick Banes	355	16

- ^{1} Rankings are as of 6 January 2020.

=== Other entrants ===
The following players received wildcards into the singles main draw:

- (Australia) Aaron Addison
- (Australia) Jai Corbett
- (Australia) Jayden Court
- (Australia) Jake Delaney
- (Australia) Jesse Delaney

The following player received entry into the singles main draw as an alternate:

- (Australia) Dane Sweeny

The following players received entry from the qualifying draw:

- (Japan) Yoshihito Nishioka
- (Belarus) Yaraslav Shyla

== Champions ==
=== Singles ===
- (United States) Steve Johnson def. (Italy) Stefano Travaglia 7–6^{(7–2)}, 7–6^{(7–3)}.

=== Doubles ===
- (Serbia) Nikola Ćaćić / (Ukraine) Denys Molchanov def. (El Salvador) Marcelo Arévalo / (United Kingdom) Jonny O'Mara 7–6^{(7–3)}, 6–4.
