= 2016 WHB Hungarian Open =

- Date: 24 – 30 October
- Edition: 1st
- Surface: Hard (indoor)
- Location: Budapest, Hungary

Champions

Singles
- (Romania) Marius Copil

Doubles
- (Belarus) Aliaksandr Bury / (Sweden) Andreas Siljeström
WHB Hungarian Open	· 2017 →

The 2016 WHB Hungarian Open was a professional tennis tournament played on indoor hardcourt. It was the inaugural edition of the tournament and was part of the 2016 ATP Challenger Tour. It took place in Budapest, Hungary between 24 and 30 October 2016.

== Singles main draw entrants ==
=== Seeds ===
Country	Player	Rank^{1}	Seed
FRA	Pierre-Hugues Herbert	91	1
SVK	Andrej Martin	118	2
ITA	Thomas Fabbiano	119	3
BEL	Steve Darcis	120	4
RUS	Daniil Medvedev	123	5
SVK	Lukáš Lacko	124	6
UZB	Denis Istomin	137	7
FRA	Vincent Millot	139	8

- ^{1} Rankings are as of October 17, 2016.

=== Other entrants ===
The following players received wildcards into the singles main draw:

- (Turkey) Cem İlkel
- (Russia) Daniil Medvedev
- (Hungary) Péter Nagy
- (Spain) Tommy Robredo

The following player received entry into the singles main draw using a protected ranking:

- (Germany) Cedrik-Marcel Stebe

The following player received entry into the singles main draw through special exempt:

- (Slovakia) Norbert Gombos

The following player entered as an alternate:

- (Italy) Federico Gaio

The following players received entry from the qualifying draw:

- (Turkey) Marsel İlhan
- (France) Tristan Lamasine
- (Croatia) Ante Pavić
- (Poland) Michał Przysiężny

== Champions ==
=== Singles ===
- (Romania) Marius Copil def. (Belgium) Steve Darcis, 6–4, 6–2.

=== Doubles ===
- (Belarus) Aliaksandr Bury / (Sweden) Andreas Siljeström def. (United States) James Cerretani / (Austria) Philipp Oswald, 6–4, 7–6^{(7–4)}.
