= 2017 Hungarian Challenger Open =

- Date: 6–12 February
- Edition: 2nd
- Surface: Hard (indoor)
- Location: Budapest, Hungary

Champions

Singles
- (Austria) Jürgen Melzer

Doubles
- (Croatia) Dino Marcan / (Austria) Tristan-Samuel Weissborn
| ← 2016 · | Hungarian Challenger Open | · 2018 → |

The 2017 Hungarian Challenger Open is a professional tennis tournament played on indoor hard courts. It is the second edition of the tournament and is a part of the 2017 ATP Challenger Tour. It takes place in Budapest, Hungary between 6 and 12 February 2017.

== Singles main-draw entrants ==
=== Seeds ===
| Country | Player | Rank^{1} | Seed |
|---|---|---|---|
| ~~SVK~~ | ~~Lukáš Lacko~~ | ~~108~~ | ~~1~~ |
| UKR | Sergiy Stakhovsky | 111 | 2 |
| ROU | Marius Copil | 129 | 3 |
| ITA | Thomas Fabbiano | 131 | 4 |
| RUS | Evgeny Donskoy | 132 | 5 |
| SVK | Norbert Gombos | 136 | 6 |
| KOR | Lee Duck-hee | 139 | 7 |
| ITA | Luca Vanni | 149 | 8 |

- ^{1} Rankings are as of January 30, 2017.

=== Other entrants ===
The following players received wildcards into the singles main draw:

- (Hungary) Attila Balázs
- (Hungary) Gábor Borsos
- (Hungary) Zsombor Piros
- (Hungary) Máté Valkusz

The following player received entry into the singles main draw using a protected ranking:

- (Austria) Jürgen Melzer

The following players received entry from the qualifying draw:

- (Germany) Matthias Bachinger
- (Germany) Yannick Hanfmann
- (Poland) Michał Przysiężny
- (Russia) Alexey Vatutin

The following players received entry as lucky losers:

- (Italy) Andrea Arnaboldi
- (United Kingdom) Edward Corrie
- (Italy) Gianluigi Quinzi

== Champions ==
=== Singles ===
- (Austria) Jürgen Melzer def. (Hungary) Márton Fucsovics 7–6^{(8–6)}, 6–2.

=== Doubles ===
- (Croatia) Dino Marcan / (Austria) Tristan-Samuel Weissborn def. (Slovenia) Blaž Kavčič / (Croatia) Franko Škugor 6–3, 3–6, [16–14].
