= 2017 Hungarian Challenger Open – Singles =

Singles
- 2017 Hungarian Challenger Open

Final
- Champion: (Austria) Jürgen Melzer
- Runner-up: (Hungary) Márton Fucsovics
- Score: 7–6^{(8–6)}, 6–2

Events
Singles	Doubles
← 2016 ·	Hungarian Challenger Open	· 2018 →

Marius Copil was the defending champion but lost in the quarterfinals to Jürgen Melzer.

Melzer won the title after defeating Márton Fucsovics 7–6^{(8–6)}, 6–2 in the final.

== Seeds ==
1. (Slovakia) Lukáš Lacko (withdrew)
2. (Ukraine) Sergiy Stakhovsky (first round)
3. (Romania) Marius Copil (quarterfinals)
4. (Italy) Thomas Fabbiano (first round)
5. (Russia) Evgeny Donskoy (first round)
6. (Slovakia) Norbert Gombos (second round)
7. (South Korea) Lee Duck-hee (first round)
8. (Italy) Luca Vanni (quarterfinals)

== Draw ==
=== Key ===
- Q = Qualifier
- WC = Wild card
- LL = Lucky loser
- Alt = Alternate
- SE = Special exempt
- PR = Protected ranking
- ITF = ITF entry
- JE = Junior exempt
- w/o = Walkover
- r = Retired
- d = Defaulted
- SR = Special ranking

=== Finals ===
Semifinals
(Norway) Casper Ruud	0	0
(Hungary) Márton Fucsovics	6	6
PR	(Austria) Jürgen Melzer	6	7^{7}
LL	(United Kingdom) Edward Corrie	4	6^{5}

Final
(Hungary) Márton Fucsovics	6^{6}	2
PR	(Austria) Jürgen Melzer	7^{8}	6

=== Top half ===
First round
LL	(Italy) G Quinzi	6	6
WC	(Hungary) A Balázs	2	3
Q	(Russia) A Vatutin	6	4
(Serbia) L Đere	3	0^{r}
Q	(Poland) M Przysiężny	4	7^{7}	6^{1}
(Bosnia and Herzegovina) M Bašić	6	6^{4}	7^{7}
(Norway) C Ruud	7	6
7	(South Korea) D-h Lee	5	2
4	(Italy) T Fabbiano	3	3
Q	(Germany) M Bachinger	6	6
(Italy) L Giustino	4	4
(Hungary) M Fucsovics	6	6
(Croatia) F Škugor	3	7^{7}	7^{7}
(Belarus) I Ivashka	6	6^{5}	6^{0}
LL	(Italy) A Arnaboldi	3	3
8	(Italy) L Vanni	6	6

Second round
LL	(Italy) G Quinzi	6	2	2
Q	(Russia) A Vatutin	1	6	6
(Bosnia and Herzegovina) M Bašić	5	6	3
(Norway) C Ruud	7	2	6
Q	(Germany) M Bachinger	3	3
(Hungary) M Fucsovics	6	6
(Croatia) F Škugor	4	3
8	(Italy) L Vanni	6	6

Quarterfinals
Q	(Russia) A Vatutin	2	6	6^{5}
(Norway) C Ruud	6	4	7^{7}
(Hungary) M Fucsovics	6	7
8	(Italy) L Vanni	3	5

Semifinals
(Norway) C Ruud	0	0
(Hungary) M Fucsovics	6	6

=== Bottom half ===
First round
6	(Slovakia) N Gombos	6	6
WC	(Hungary) M Valkusz	4	2
WC	(Hungary) G Borsos	4	2
PR	(Austria) J Melzer	6	6
(Belgium) J De Loore	6	7^{7}
(Germany) Marc Sieber	3	6^{4}
(Czech Republic) V Šafránek	1	4
3	(Romania) M Copil	6	6
5	(Russia) E Donskoy	4	6	3
(Belgium) Y Reuter	6	4	6
LL	(United Kingdom) E Corrie	0	6	6
WC	(Hungary) Z Piros	6	4	2
Q	(Germany) Y Hanfmann	3	6^{4}
(Germany) Y Maden	6	7^{7}
(Slovenia) B Kavčič	3	6	6
2	(Ukraine) S Stakhovsky	6	3	4

Second round
6	(Slovakia) N Gombos	7	2	2
PR	(Austria) J Melzer	5	6	6
(Belgium) J De Loore	4	6	1
3	(Romania) M Copil	6	4	6
(Belgium) Y Reuter	6	3	4
LL	(United Kingdom) E Corrie	4	6	6
(Germany) Y Maden	6	3	6
(Slovenia) B Kavčič	3	6	4

Quarterfinals
PR	(Austria) J Melzer	6	6
3	(Romania) M Copil	4	4
LL	(United Kingdom) E Corrie	6	6
(Germany) Y Maden	4	4

Semifinals
PR	(Austria) J Melzer	6	7^{7}
LL	(United Kingdom) E Corrie	4	6^{5}
