= 2020 Bendigo Challenger – Doubles =

Doubles
- 2020 Bendigo Challenger

Final
- Champions: (Serbia) Nikola Čačić (Ukraine) Denys Molchanov
- Runners-up: (El Salvador) Marcelo Arévalo (United Kingdom) Jonny O'Mara
- Score: 7–6^{(7–3)}, 6–4

Events
Singles	Doubles
Bendigo Challenger	· 2022 →

This was the first edition of the tournament.

Nikola Čačić and Denys Molchanov won the title after defeating Marcelo Arévalo and Jonny O'Mara 7–6^{(7–3)}, 6–4 in the final.

== Seeds ==
1. (Argentina) Andrés Molteni / (Monaco) Hugo Nys (quarterfinals)
2. (El Salvador) Marcelo Arévalo / (United Kingdom) Jonny O'Mara (final)
3. (Netherlands) Sander Arends / (Chinese Taipei) Hsieh Cheng-peng (semifinals)
4. (Israel) Jonathan Erlich / (Belarus) Andrei Vasilevski (withdrew)

== Draw ==
=== Key ===
- Q = Qualifier
- WC = Wild card
- LL = Lucky loser
- Alt = Alternate
- SE = Special exempt
- PR = Protected ranking
- ITF = ITF entry
- JE = Junior exempt
- w/o = Walkover
- r = Retired
- d = Defaulted
- SR = Special ranking

First round
1	(Argentina) A Molteni (Monaco) H Nys	4	7^{7}	[10]
(United States) N Monroe (United States) J Withrow	6	6^{1}	[6]
(Uruguay) A Behar (Australia) M Reid	6	6
WC	(Australia) Jayden Court (Australia) Alexander Crnokrak	1	3
Alt	(Japan) S Shimabukuro (South Korea) M-k Song	6	6
(Japan) T Matsui (Japan) Y Nishioka	3	3
(United Kingdom) B Klein (Australia) S Puodziunas	6^{4}	4
(Serbia) N Čačić (Ukraine) D Molchanov	7^{7}	6
(India) S Mukund (China) F Sun	6	6
(Switzerland) L Margaroli (Italy) A Vavassori	3	4
(Spain) G Granollers (Spain) D Vega Hernández	5	0
3	(Netherlands) S Arends (Chinese Taipei) C-p Hsieh	7	6
WC	(Australia) C Puttergill (Australia) D Sweeny	2	4
WC	(Australia) M Banes (Australia) B Ellis	6	6
(Sweden) A Göransson (Netherlands) S Verbeek	6	5	[2]
2	(El Salvador) M Arévalo (United Kingdom) J O'Mara	2	7	[10]

Quarterfinals
1	(Argentina) A Molteni (Monaco) H Nys	6	3	[13]
(Uruguay) A Behar (Australia) M Reid	1	6	[15]
Alt	(Japan) S Shimabukuro (South Korea) M-k Song	4	6^{3}
(Serbia) N Čačić (Ukraine) D Molchanov	6	7^{7}
(India) S Mukund (China) F Sun
3	(Netherlands) S Arends (Chinese Taipei) C-p Hsieh	w/o
WC	(Australia) M Banes (Australia) B Ellis	7^{7}	4	[9]
2	(El Salvador) M Arévalo (United Kingdom) J O'Mara	6^{4}	6	[11]

Semifinals
(Uruguay) A Behar (Australia) M Reid	6	3	[1]
(Serbia) N Čačić (Ukraine) D Molchanov	3	6	[10]
3	(Netherlands) S Arends (Chinese Taipei) C-p Hsieh	3	2
2	(El Salvador) M Arévalo (United Kingdom) J O'Mara	6	6

Final
(Serbia) N Čačić (Ukraine) D Molchanov	7^{7}	6
2	(El Salvador) M Arévalo (United Kingdom) J O'Mara	6^{3}	4
