= 2016 WHB Hungarian Open – Singles =

Singles
- 2016 WHB Hungarian Open

Final
- Champion: (Romania) Marius Copil
- Runner-up: (Belgium) Steve Darcis
- Score: 6–4, 6–2

Events
Singles	Doubles
- WHB Hungarian Open

This was the first edition of the tournament.

Marius Copil won the title after defeating Steve Darcis 6–4, 6–2 in the final.

== Seeds ==
1. (France) Pierre-Hugues Herbert (second round)
2. (Slovakia) Andrej Martin (first round)
3. (Italy) Thomas Fabbiano (second round)
4. (Belgium) Steve Darcis (final)
5. (Russia) Daniil Medvedev (semifinals)
6. (Slovakia) Lukáš Lacko (quarterfinals)
7. (Uzbekistan) Denis Istomin (quarterfinals, retired)
8. (France) Vincent Millot (second round)

== Draw ==
Key

- Q = Qualifier
- WC = Wild card
- LL = Lucky loser
- Alt = Alternate
- ITF = ITF entry
- PR = Protected ranking
- SR = Special ranking
- SE = Special exempt
- JE = Junior exempt
- JR = Junior Accelerator Programme entrant
- CO = College Accelerator Programme entrant
- NG = Next Gen Accelerator Program entrant
- w/o = Walkover
- r = Retired
- d = Defaulted

=== Finals ===
Semifinals
5/WC	(Russia) Daniil Medvedev	5	4
(Romania) Marius Copil	7	6
4	(Belgium) Steve Darcis	2	6	6
(France) Kenny de Schepper	6	4	3

Final
(Romania) Marius Copil	6	6
4	(Belgium) Steve Darcis	4	2

=== Top half ===
First round
1	(France) P-H Herbert	6	5	7
(Serbia) P Krstin	3	7	5
WC	(Spain) T Robredo	7^{8}	6^{5}	7
(Canada) S Diez	6^{6}	7^{7}	5
PR	(Germany) C-M Stebe	5	7	4
(Russia) A Rublev	7	5	6
(Spain) E López-Pérez	3	4
5/WC	(Russia) D Medvedev	6	6
3	(Italy) T Fabbiano	6	1	6
(Italy) L Vanni	3	6	4
(Hungary) M Fucsovics	6	6
(Bosnia and Herzegovina) M Bašić	3	1
(Serbia) M Tepavac	2	4
(Romania) M Copil	6	6
WC	(Turkey) C İlkel	3	4
8	(France) V Millot	6	6

Second round
1	(France) P-H Herbert	2	7^{7}	3
WC	(Spain) T Robredo	6	6^{5}	6
(Russia) A Rublev	3	2
5/WC	(Russia) D Medvedev	6	6
3	(Italy) T Fabbiano	6	2	1
(Hungary) M Fucsovics	4	6	6
(Romania) M Copil	7^{8}	6
8	(France) V Millot	6^{6}	1

Quarterfinals
WC	(Spain) T Robredo	5	2
5/WC	(Russia) D Medvedev	7	6
(Hungary) M Fucsovics	5	3
(Romania) M Copil	7	6

Semifinals
5/WC	(Russia) D Medvedev	5	4
(Romania) M Copil	7	6

=== Bottom half ===
First round
7	(Uzbekistan) D Istomin	6	6
(Germany) D Brands	2	3
WC	(Hungary) P Nagy	7^{7}	2	4
SE	(Slovakia) N Gombos	6^{3}	6	6
(Serbia) L Đere	7	6
Alt	(Italy) F Gaio	5	3
Q	(Turkey) M İlhan	4	2
4	(Belgium) S Darcis	6	6
6	(Slovakia) L Lacko	3	6	6
(Belarus) I Ivashka	6	3	2
(France) Q Halys	6	6
Q	(France) T Lamasine	4	1
(France) K de Schepper	7^{7}	6
Q	(Croatia) A Pavić	6^{5}	1
Q	(Poland) M Przysiężny	4	7^{11}	6
2	(Slovakia) A Martin	6	6^{9}	4

Second round
7	(Uzbekistan) D Istomin	6	6
SE	(Slovakia) N Gombos	3	4
(Serbia) L Đere	3	5
4	(Belgium) S Darcis	6	7
6	(Slovakia) L Lacko	6	6
(France) Q Halys	2	2
(France) K de Schepper	6	3	6
Q	(Poland) M Przysiężny	3	6	2

Quarterfinals
7	(Uzbekistan) D Istomin	2	0^{r}
4	(Belgium) S Darcis	6	0
6	(Slovakia) L Lacko	4	6	5
(France) K de Schepper	6	3	7

Semifinals
4	(Belgium) S Darcis	2	6	6
(France) K de Schepper	6	4	3
