= 2018 Hungarian Challenger Open – Singles =

Singles
- 2018 Hungarian Challenger Open

Final
- Champion: (Canada) Vasek Pospisil
- Runner-up: (Spain) Nicola Kuhn
- Score: 7–6^{(7–3)}, 3–6, 6–3

Events
| Singles | Doubles |
| ← 2017 · | Hungarian Challenger Open | · 2019 → |

Jürgen Melzer was the defending champion but chose not to defend his title.

Vasek Pospisil won the title after defeating Nicola Kuhn 7–6^{(7–3)}, 3–6, 6–3 in the final.

== Seeds ==
1. (Hungary) Márton Fucsovics (semifinals)
2. (Canada) Vasek Pospisil (champion)
3. (France) Quentin Halys (first round)
4. (Sweden) Elias Ymer (quarterfinals)
5. (Canada) Félix Auger-Aliassime (second round)
6. (Estonia) Jürgen Zopp (quarterfinals)
7. (Croatia) Viktor Galović (second round)
8. (Serbia) Nikola Milojević (semifinals)

== Draw ==
=== Key ===
- Q = Qualifier
- WC = Wild card
- LL = Lucky loser
- Alt = Alternate
- SE = Special exempt
- PR = Protected ranking
- ITF = ITF entry
- JE = Junior exempt
- w/o = Walkover
- r = Retired
- d = Defaulted
- SR = Special ranking

=== Finals ===
Semifinals
1 | (Hungary) Márton Fucsovics | 3 | 6^{5}
Alt | (Spain) Nicola Kuhn | 6 | 7^{7}
8 | (Serbia) Nikola Milojević | 5 | 6 | 4
2 | (Canada) Vasek Pospisil | 7 | 4 | 6

Final
Alt | (Spain) Nicola Kuhn | 6^{3} | 6 | 3
2 | (Canada) Vasek Pospisil | 7^{7} | 3 | 6

=== Top half ===
First round
1 | (Hungary) M Fucsovics | 7 | 6
(Hungary) A Balázs | 5 | 0
(Austria) D Novak | 3 | 3
(Poland) H Hurkacz | 6 | 6
(Belarus) I Ivashka | 2 | 6 | 6^{3}
Q | (Germany) K Krawietz | 6 | 3 | 7^{7}
(Serbia) P Krstin | 2 | 0
7 | (Croatia) V Galović | 6 | 6
3 | (France) Q Halys | 7^{7} | 1 | 6^{4}
WC | (Hungary) M Valkusz | 6^{3} | 6 | 7^{7}
(Italy) A Arnaboldi | 6^{4} | 6 | 4
Alt | (Spain) N Kuhn | 7^{7} | 4 | 6
(Belgium) A De Greef | 6 | 6
Q | (Germany) Jeremy Jahn | 1 | 3
WC | (Hungary) Z Piros | 4 | 6^{4}
6 | (Estonia) J Zopp | 6 | 7^{7}

Second round
1 | (Hungary) M Fucsovics | 6^{3} | 6 | 6
(Poland) H Hurkacz | 7^{7} | 3 | 4
Q | (Germany) K Krawietz | 6 | 6
7 | (Croatia) V Galović | 4 | 2
WC | (Hungary) M Valkusz | 2 | 6^{5}
Alt | (Spain) N Kuhn | 6 | 7^{7}
(Belgium) A De Greef | 3 | 6^{5}
6 | (Estonia) J Zopp | 6 | 7^{7}

Quarterfinals
1 | (Hungary) M Fucsovics | 6 | 6
Q | (Germany) K Krawietz | 4 | 3
Alt | (Spain) N Kuhn | 6 | 6
6 | (Estonia) J Zopp | 3 | 3

Semifinals
1 | (Hungary) M Fucsovics | 3 | 6^{5}
Alt | (Spain) N Kuhn | 6 | 7^{7}

=== Bottom half ===
First round
8 | (Serbia) N Milojević | 6 | 6
(Czech Republic) V Šafránek | 3 | 4
WC | (Hungary) G Borsos | 7^{7} | 7^{7}
Q | (Italy) A Pellegrino | 6^{5} | 6^{5}
(Bosnia and Herzegovina) A Šetkić | 5 | 7 | 1
(Czech Republic) Z Kolář | 7 | 5 | 6
WC | (Hungary) P Nagy | 3 | 2
4 | (Sweden) E Ymer | 6 | 6
5 | (Canada) F Auger-Aliassime | 3 | 7 | 6
(Slovenia) B Rola | 6 | 5 | 1
(Poland) K Majchrzak | 5 | 2
Q | (France) C Lestienne | 7 | 6
(Russia) T Gabashvili | 5 | 2
(Czech Republic) A Pavlásek | 7 | 6
(Belarus) U Ignatik | 4 | 2
2 | (Canada) V Pospisil | 6 | 6

Second round
8 | (Serbia) N Milojević | 6 | 6
WC | (Hungary) G Borsos | 1 | 2
(Czech Republic) Z Kolář
4 | (Sweden) E Ymer | w/o
5 | (Canada) F Auger-Aliassime | 0 | 2
Q | (France) C Lestienne | 6 | 6
(Czech Republic) A Pavlásek | 4 | 3
2 | (Canada) V Pospisil | 6 | 6

Quarterfinals
8 | (Serbia) N Milojević | 7^{9} | 6
4 | (Sweden) E Ymer | 6^{7} | 3
Q | (France) C Lestienne | 4 | 6 | 3
2 | (Canada) V Pospisil | 6 | 4 | 6

Semifinals
8 | (Serbia) N Milojević | 5 | 6 | 4
2 | (Canada) V Pospisil | 7 | 4 | 6
