= 2019 Hungarian Challenger Open =

- Date: 4–10 February
- Edition: 4th
- Surface: Hard (indoor)
- Location: Budapest, Hungary

Champions

Singles
- (Kazakhstan) Alexander Bublik

Doubles
- (Germany) Kevin Krawietz / (Slovakia) Filip Polášek
- Hungarian Challenger Open

The 2019 Hungarian Challenger Open was a professional tennis tournament played on indoor hard courts. It was the fourth edition of the tournament and was a part of the 2019 ATP Challenger Tour. It took place in Budapest, Hungary between 4 and 10 February 2019.

== Singles main-draw entrants ==
=== Seeds ===
Country	Player	Rank^{1}	Seed
IND	Ramkumar Ramanathan	133	1
CZE	Lukáš Rosol	140	2
EST	Jürgen Zopp	149	3
AUT	Dennis Novak	154	4
FRA	Grégoire Barrère	155	5
GER	Oscar Otte	165	6
ITA	Filippo Baldi	166	7
KAZ	Alexander Bublik	171	8
SRB	Nikola Milojević	174	9
BEL	Kimmer Coppejans	195	10
NED	Tallon Griekspoor	211	11
SVK	Filip Horanský	219	12
FRA	Maxime Janvier	222	13
CRO	Viktor Galović	230	14
CZE	Zdeněk Kolář	231	15
GER	Kevin Krawietz	232	16

- ^{1} Rankings are as of January 28, 2019.

=== Other entrants ===
The following players received wildcards into the singles main draw:

- (Hungary) Gábor Borsos
- (Slovakia) Alex Molčan
- (Hungary) Péter Nagy
- (Hungary) Zsombor Piros

The following player received entry into the singles main draw as a special exempt:

- (France) Grégoire Barrère

The following player received entry into the singles main draw using a protected ranking:

- (Poland) Michał Przysiężny

The following players received entry into the singles main draw as alternates:

- (France) Sadio Doumbia
- (France) Hugo Grenier

The following players received entry into the singles main draw using their ITF World Tennis Ranking:

- (France) Baptiste Crepatte
- (Germany) Peter Heller
- (Russia) Aslan Karatsev
- (France) Fabien Reboul

The following players received entry from the qualifying draw:

- (Canada) Steven Diez
- (Hungary) Dávid Szintai

The following player received entry as a lucky loser:

- (Italy) Alessandro Bega

== Champions ==
=== Singles ===
- (Kazakhstan) Alexander Bublik def. (Italy) Roberto Marcora 6–0, 6–3

=== Doubles ===
- (Germany) Kevin Krawietz / (Slovakia) Filip Polášek def. (Italy) Filippo Baldi / (Switzerland) Luca Margaroli 7–5, 7–6^{(7–5)}
