= 2018 Hungarian Challenger Open – Doubles =

Doubles
- 2018 Hungarian Challenger Open

Final
- Champions: (Canada) Félix Auger-Aliassime (Spain) Nicola Kuhn
- Runners-up: (Croatia) Marin Draganja (Croatia) Tomislav Draganja
- Score: 2–6, 6–2, [11–9]

Events
Singles	Doubles
← 2017 ·	Hungarian Challenger Open	· 2019 →

Dino Marcan and Tristan-Samuel Weissborn were the defending champions but chose not to defend their title.

Félix Auger-Aliassime and Nicola Kuhn won the title after defeating Marin and Tomislav Draganja 2–6, 6–2, [11–9] in the final.

== Seeds ==
1. (Croatia) Marin Draganja / (Croatia) Tomislav Draganja (final)
2. (Poland) Tomasz Bednarek / (Germany) Kevin Krawietz (first round)
3. (United Kingdom) Scott Clayton / (United Kingdom) Jonny O'Mara (quarterfinals)
4. (Australia) Rameez Junaid / (Japan) Toshihide Matsui (quarterfinals)

== Draw ==
=== Key ===
- Q = Qualifier
- WC = Wild card
- LL = Lucky loser
- Alt = Alternate
- ITF = ITF entry
- PR = Protected ranking
- SR = Special ranking
- SE = Special exempt
- JE = Junior exempt
- JR = Junior Accelerator Programme entrant
- CO = College Accelerator Programme entrant
- NG = Next Gen Accelerator Program entrant
- w/o = Walkover
- r = Retired
- d = Defaulted

First round
1	(Croatia) M Draganja (Croatia) T Draganja	7	7^{7}
(Croatia) I Sabanov (Croatia) M Sabanov	5	6^{4}
(Czech Republic) Z Kolář (Czech Republic) A Pavlásek	6^{5}	6	[10]
(Poland) G Panfil (Ukraine) V Uzhylovskyi	7^{7}	1	[12]
4	(Australia) R Junaid (Japan) T Matsui	6	6
WC	(Hungary) G Kisgyörgy (Hungary) Z Piros	3	2
(Italy) A Arnaboldi (Ukraine) D Molchanov	2	6	[9]
(Sweden) A Siljeström (Sweden) E Ymer	6	3	[11]
(Canada) F Auger-Aliassime (Spain) N Kuhn	7	0
WC	(Czech Republic) V Šafránek (Hungary) M Valkusz	5	0^{r}
(Hungary) A Balázs (Hungary) G Borsos	3	4
3	(United Kingdom) S Clayton (United Kingdom) J O'Mara	6	6
WC	(Hungary) L Gödry (Hungary) P Nagy	6	6
(Serbia) N Milojević (Bosnia and Herzegovina) A Šetkić	2	2
(Belarus) I Ivashka (Austria) D Novak	6	6
2	(Poland) T Bednarek (Germany) K Krawietz	3	4

Quarterfinals
1	(Croatia) M Draganja (Croatia) T Draganja	3	6	[10]
(Poland) G Panfil (Ukraine) V Uzhylovskyi	6	3	[1]
4	(Australia) R Junaid (Japan) T Matsui	4	4
(Sweden) A Siljeström (Sweden) E Ymer	6	6
(Canada) F Auger-Aliassime (Spain) N Kuhn	7	7^{10}
3	(United Kingdom) S Clayton (United Kingdom) J O'Mara	5	6^{8}
WC	(Hungary) L Gödry (Hungary) P Nagy	w/o
(Belarus) I Ivashka (Austria) D Novak

Semifinals
1	(Croatia) M Draganja (Croatia) T Draganja	6	6
(Sweden) A Siljeström (Sweden) E Ymer	4	3
(Canada) F Auger-Aliassime (Spain) N Kuhn	6	6
WC	(Hungary) L Gödry (Hungary) P Nagy	4	2

Final
1	(Croatia) M Draganja (Croatia) T Draganja	6	2	[9]
(Canada) F Auger-Aliassime (Spain) N Kuhn	2	6	[11]
