= 2019 Hungarian Challenger Open – Doubles =

Doubles
- 2019 Hungarian Challenger Open

Final
- Champions: (Germany) Kevin Krawietz (Slovakia) Filip Polášek
- Runners-up: (Italy) Filippo Baldi (Switzerland) Luca Margaroli
- Score: 7–5, 7–6^{(7–5)}

Events
Singles	Doubles
← 2018 ·	Hungarian Challenger Open	· 2020 →

Félix Auger-Aliassime and Nicola Kuhn were the defending champions but chose not to defend their title.

Kevin Krawietz and Filip Polášek won the title after defeating Filippo Baldi and Luca Margaroli 7–5, 7–6^{(7–5)} in the final.

== Seeds ==
1. (Germany) Kevin Krawietz / (Slovakia) Filip Polášek (champions)
2. (Germany) Andre Begemann / (Australia) Rameez Junaid (quarterfinals)
3. (Netherlands) David Pel / (Croatia) Antonio Šančić (quarterfinals)
4. (United Kingdom) Scott Clayton / (Canada) Adil Shamasdin (semifinals)

== Draw ==
=== Key ===
- Q = Qualifier
- WC = Wild card
- LL = Lucky loser
- Alt = Alternate
- SE = Special exempt
- PR = Protected ranking
- ITF = ITF entry
- JE = Junior exempt
- w/o = Walkover
- r = Retired
- d = Defaulted
- SR = Special ranking

First round
1	(Germany) K Krawietz (Slovakia) F Polášek	6	7^{8}
WC	(Hungary) Mark Kéki (Hungary) F Marozsán	1	6^{6}
(Poland) T Bednarek (Czech Republic) Z Kolář	w/o
WC	(Hungary) Z Piros (Hungary) D Szintai
3	(Netherlands) D Pel (Croatia) A Šančić	6	7^{7}
(Switzerland) M-A Hüsler (Poland) S Walków	3	6^{2}
ITF	(Guatemala) W González (Spain) S Martos Gornés	5	3
(Serbia) N Čačić (Serbia) N Milojević	7	6
(France) M Janvier (Netherlands) M Vervoort	6	6
ITF	(Italy) R Bonadio (Germany) Peter Heller	2	3
(Austria) L Miedler (Austria) T-S Weissborn	6	4	[7]
4	(United Kingdom) S Clayton (Canada) A Shamasdin	3	6	[10]
WC	(Hungary) G Borsos (Hungary) P Nagy	6^{5}	4
(Italy) F Baldi (Switzerland) L Margaroli	7^{7}	6
(Kazakhstan) A Bublik (Germany) D Masur	4	6	[7]
2	(Germany) A Begemann (Australia) R Junaid	6	4	[10]

Quarterfinals
1	(Germany) K Krawietz (Slovakia) F Polášek	6	6
(Poland) T Bednarek (Czech Republic) Z Kolář	0	4
3	(Netherlands) D Pel (Croatia) A Šančić	4	7	[5]
(Serbia) N Čačić (Serbia) N Milojević	6	5	[10]
(France) M Janvier (Netherlands) M Vervoort	1	6^{5}
4	(United Kingdom) S Clayton (Canada) A Shamasdin	6	7^{7}
(Italy) F Baldi (Switzerland) L Margaroli	6	7
2	(Germany) A Begemann (Australia) R Junaid	4	5

Semifinals
1	(Germany) K Krawietz (Slovakia) F Polášek	7	7^{7}
(Serbia) N Čačić (Serbia) N Milojević	5	6^{4}
4	(United Kingdom) S Clayton (Canada) A Shamasdin	4	6^{4}
(Italy) F Baldi (Switzerland) L Margaroli	6	7^{7}

Final
1	(Germany) K Krawietz (Slovakia) F Polášek	7	7^{7}
(Italy) F Baldi (Switzerland) L Margaroli	5	6^{5}
