= 2020 Bendigo Challenger – Singles =

Singles
- 2020 Bendigo Challenger

Final
- Champion: (United States) Steve Johnson
- Runner-up: (Italy) Stefano Travaglia
- Score: 7–6^{(7–2)}, 7–6^{(7–3)}

Events
Singles	Doubles
- Bendigo Challenger

This was the first edition of the tournament.

Steve Johnson won the title after defeating Stefano Travaglia 7–6^{(7–2)}, 7–6^{(7–3)} in the final.

== Seeds ==
All seeds receive a bye into the second round.

1. (Hungary) Márton Fucsovics (second round, retired)
2. (Spain) Roberto Carballés Baena (quarterfinals)
3. (Italy) Stefano Travaglia (final)
4. (United States) Steve Johnson (champion)
5. (Bosnia and Herzegovina) Damir Džumhur (quarterfinals)
6. (Belarus) Egor Gerasimov (second round)
7. (United States) Marcos Giron (semifinals)
8. (Australia) Christopher O'Connell (quarterfinals)
9. (France) Hugo Gaston (second round)
10. (Japan) Yosuke Watanuki (third round)
11. (India) Sasikumar Mukund (third round)
12. (France) Hugo Grenier (third round)
13. (Chile) Marcelo Tomás Barrios Vera (third round)
14. (Russia) Konstantin Kravchuk (third round)
15. (El Salvador) Marcelo Arévalo (second round)
16. (Australia) Maverick Banes (third round)

== Draw ==
Key

- Q = Qualifier
- WC = Wild card
- LL = Lucky loser
- Alt = Alternate
- ITF = ITF entry
- PR = Protected ranking
- SR = Special ranking
- SE = Special exempt
- JE = Junior exempt
- JR = Junior Accelerator Programme entrant
- CO = College Accelerator Programme entrant
- NG = Next Gen Accelerator Program entrant
- w/o = Walkover
- r = Retired
- d = Defaulted

=== Finals ===
Quarterfinals
(Italy) Andrea Vavassori	6	7
5	(Bosnia and Herzegovina) Damir Džumhur	4	5
4	(United States) Steve Johnson	6	7^{7}
(France) Harold Mayot	3	6^{2}
8	(Australia) Christopher O'Connell	4	2
3	(Italy) Stefano Travaglia	6	6
7	(United States) Marcos Giron	6	6
2	(Spain) Roberto Carballés Baena	4	2

Semifinals
(Italy) Andrea Vavassori	3	1
4	(United States) Steve Johnson	6	6
3	(Italy) Stefano Travaglia	6	6
7	(United States) Marcos Giron	3	3

Final
4	(United States) Steve Johnson	7^{7}	7^{7}
3	(Italy) Stefano Travaglia	6^{2}	6^{3}

=== Top half ===
==== Section 1 ====
First round
(Italy) A Vavassori	6	6
(Ukraine) Eric Vanshelboim	4	4
(South Korea) M-k Song	3	4
(Japan) N Tajima	6	6
(Japan) S Shimabukuro	6^{7}	6	6
(Netherlands) S Verbeek	7^{9}	4	4
Alt	(Australia) D Sweeny	6^{5}	6	6
(United States) Alec Adamson	7^{7}	4	2

Second round
1	(Hungary) M Fucsovics	4^{r}
(Italy) A Vavassori	5
(Japan) N Tajima	1	2
16	(Australia) M Banes	6	6
10	(Japan) Yo Watanuki	7^{7}	6
(Japan) S Shimabukuro	6^{5}	3
Alt	(Australia) D Sweeny	6^{6}	3
5	(Bosnia and Herzegovina) D Džumhur	7^{8}	6

Third round
(Italy) A Vavassori	6^{5}	6	6
16	(Australia) M Banes	7^{7}	3	4
10	(Japan) Yo Watanuki	4	6	3
5	(Bosnia and Herzegovina) D Džumhur	6	3	6

Quarterfinals
(Italy) A Vavassori	6	7
5	(Bosnia and Herzegovina) D Džumhur	4	5

==== Section 2 ====
First round
(Romania) ND Ionel	4	6	2
(Greece) M Kalovelonis	6	3	6
WC	(Australia) Jayden Court	2	6^{4}
(Australia) C Puttergill	6	7^{7}
(China) F Sun	7^{8}	7
WC	(Australia) A Addison	6^{6}	5
(France) H Mayot	6	7
(Poland) K Żuk	4	5

Second round
4	(United States) S Johnson	6	6^{8}	6
(Greece) M Kalovelonis	3	7^{10}	3
(Australia) C Puttergill	6	6
15	(El Salvador) M Arévalo	4	2
12	(France) H Grenier	7	6
(China) F Sun	5	1
(France) H Mayot	7	6
6	(Belarus) E Gerasimov	5	4

Third round
4	(United States) S Johnson	7^{7}	6
(Australia) C Puttergill	6^{4}	0
12	(France) H Grenier	6^{6}	5
(France) H Mayot	7^{8}	7

Quarterfinals
4	(United States) S Johnson	6	7^{7}
(France) H Mayot	3	6^{2}

=== Bottom half ===
==== Section 3 ====
First round
(Italy) L Caruana	1	6	6
Q	(Belarus) Y Shyla	6	4	1
(Japan) T Matsui	2	0
(Australia) Alexander Crnokrak	6	6
(Australia) Jacob Grills	4	6	4
(Argentina) MF Descotte	6	2	6
(United Kingdom) B Klein	3	5
(Australia) D Kelly	6	7

Second round
8	(Australia) C O'Connell	6	6
(Italy) L Caruana	3	1
(Australia) A Crnokrak	6	7^{7}
9	(France) H Gaston	4	6^{2}
14	(Russia) K Kravchuk	6	6
(Argentina) MF Descotte	2	4
(Australia) D Kelly	4	4
3	(Italy) S Travaglia	6	6

Third round
8	(Australia) C O'Connell	6	6
(Australia) A Crnokrak	4	3
14	(Russia) K Kravchuk	6^{7}	3
3	(Italy) S Travaglia	7^{9}	6

Quarterfinals
8	(Australia) C O'Connell	4	2
3	(Italy) S Travaglia	6	6

==== Section 4 ====
First round
(Greece) M Pervolarakis	7^{7}	6
(Spain) G Granollers	6^{3}	3
(Northern Mariana Islands) C Sinclair	2	4
Q	(Japan) Y Nishioka	6	6
(Monaco) H Nys	6	6
WC	(Australia) Ja Delaney	4	3
WC	(Australia) Je Delaney	4	1
WC	(Australia) Jai Corbett	6	6

Second round
7	(United States) M Giron	6	6
(Greece) M Pervolarakis	3	0
Q	(Japan) Y Nishioka	2^{r}
11	(India) S Mukund	5
13	(Chile) MT Barrios Vera	6	6
(Monaco) H Nys	2	2
WC	(Australia) J Corbett	0	4
2	(Spain) R Carballés Baena	6	6

Third round
7	(United States) M Giron	6	6
11	(India) S Mukund	4	3
13	(Chile) MT Barrios Vera	7	3	2
2	(Spain) R Carballés Baena	5	6	6

Quarterfinals
7	(United States) M Giron	6	6
2	(Spain) R Carballés Baena	4	2
