= 2019 Hungarian Challenger Open – Singles =

Singles
- 2019 Hungarian Challenger Open

Final
- Champion: (Kazakhstan) Alexander Bublik
- Runner-up: (Italy) Roberto Marcora
- Score: 6–0, 6–3

Events
Singles	Doubles
← 2018 ·	Hungarian Challenger Open	· 2020 →

Vasek Pospisil was the defending champion but chose not to defend his title.

Alexander Bublik won the title after defeating Roberto Marcora 6–0, 6–3 in the final.

== Seeds ==
All seeds receive a bye into the second round.

1. (India) Ramkumar Ramanathan (second round)
2. (Czech Republic) Lukáš Rosol (second round)
3. (Estonia) Jürgen Zopp (second round)
4. (Austria) Dennis Novak (second round, retired)
5. (France) Grégoire Barrère (second round)
6. (Germany) Oscar Otte (semifinals)
7. (Italy) Filippo Baldi (third round)
8. (Kazakhstan) Alexander Bublik (champion)
9. (Serbia) Nikola Milojević (third round)
10. (Belgium) Kimmer Coppejans (second round)
11. (Netherlands) Tallon Griekspoor (second round)
12. (Slovakia) Filip Horanský (semifinals)
13. (France) Maxime Janvier (third round)
14. (Croatia) Viktor Galović (quarterfinals)
15. (Czech Republic) Zdeněk Kolář (quarterfinals)
16. (Germany) Kevin Krawietz (second round)

== Draw ==
=== Key ===
- Q = Qualifier
- WC = Wild card
- LL = Lucky loser
- Alt = Alternate
- SE = Special exempt
- PR = Protected ranking
- ITF = ITF entry
- JE = Junior exempt
- w/o = Walkover
- r = Retired
- d = Defaulted
- SR = Special ranking

=== Finals ===
Quarterfinals
15	(Czech Republic) Zdeněk Kolář	6	3	2
(Italy) Roberto Marcora	2	6	6
(France) Mathias Bourgue	3	3
6	(Germany) Oscar Otte	6	6
12	(Slovakia) Filip Horanský	6	7^{8}
WC	(Slovakia) Alex Molčan	4	6^{6}
8	(Kazakhstan) Alexander Bublik	3	6	6
14	(Croatia) Viktor Galović	6	3	4

Semifinals
(Italy) Roberto Marcora	6	7^{7}
6	(Germany) Oscar Otte	4	6^{3}
12	(Slovakia) Filip Horanský	3	0
8	(Kazakhstan) Alexander Bublik	6	6

Final
(Italy) Roberto Marcora	0	3
8	(Kazakhstan) Alexander Bublik	6	6

=== Top half ===
==== Section 1 ====
First round
(Belarus) U Ignatik	6	7
LL	(Italy) A Bega	4	5
PR	(Poland) M Przysiężny	2	4
WC	(Hungary) Z Piros	6	6
(Slovakia) N Gombos	7^{9}	6
ITF	(Russia) A Karatsev	6^{7}	2
(Italy) R Marcora	6	6
WC	(Hungary) P Nagy	2	1

Second round
1	(India) R Ramanathan	6^{4}	5
(Belarus) U Ignatik	7^{7}	7
WC	(Hungary) Z Piros	7^{7}	1	2
15	(Czech Republic) Z Kolář	6^{2}	6	6
11	(Netherlands) T Griekspoor	6	6^{5}	6^{2}
(Slovakia) N Gombos	4	7^{7}	7^{7}
(Italy) R Marcora	7^{7}	6
5/SE	(France) G Barrère	6^{2}	3

Third round
(Belarus) U Ignatik	4	7	5
15	(Czech Republic) Z Kolář	6	5	7
(Slovakia) N Gombos	3	4
(Italy) R Marcora	6	6

Quarterfinals
15	(Czech Republic) Z Kolář	6	3	2
(Italy) R Marcora	2	6	6

==== Section 2 ====
First round
(Italy) A Basso	3	6^{0}
(France) M Bourgue	6	7^{7}
ITF	(France) Baptiste Crepatte	6	7
(France) TK Wang	3	5
(Germany) D Masur	2	6	4
(Netherlands) S Griekspoor	6	3	6
Q	(Hungary) D Szintai	3	4
(Serbia) D Petrović	6	6

Second round
3	(Estonia) J Zopp	3	1
(France) M Bourgue	6	6
ITF	(France) B Crepatte	5	6	6
16	(Germany) K Krawietz	7	4	3
9	(Serbia) N Milojević	6	6^{1}	6
(Netherlands) S Griekspoor	4	7^{7}	4
(Serbia) D Petrović	6^{2}	6	6^{5}
6	(Germany) O Otte	7^{7}	3	7^{7}

Third round
(France) M Bourgue	6	6
ITF	(France) B Crepatte	3	2
9	(Serbia) N Milojević	3	4
6	(Germany) O Otte	6	6

Quarterfinals
(France) M Bourgue	3	3
6	(Germany) O Otte	6	6

=== Bottom half ===
==== Section 3 ====
First round
Alt	(France) H Grenier	2	4
(France) A Müller	6	6
(Austria) L Miedler	6	6
WC	(Hungary) G Borsos	1	4
(Croatia) N Serdarušić	2	2
(Norway) V Durasovic	6	6
WC	(Slovakia) A Molčan	5	7	7^{7}
ITF	(Germany) Peter Heller	7	5	6^{1}

Second round
7	(Italy) F Baldi	4	6	6
(France) A Müller	6	3	4
(Austria) L Miedler	2	6^{4}
12	(Slovakia) F Horanský	6	7^{7}
13	(France) M Janvier	7^{7}	3	6
(Norway) V Durasovic	6^{0}	6	3
WC	(Slovakia) A Molčan	6	3
4	(Austria) D Novak	2	0^{r}

Third round
7	(Italy) F Baldi	6	2	1
12	(Slovakia) F Horanský	3	6	6
13	(France) M Janvier	2	4
WC	(Slovakia) A Molčan	6	6

Quarterfinals
12	(Slovakia) F Horanský	6	7^{8}
WC	(Slovakia) A Molčan	4	6^{6}

==== Section 4 ====
First round
Q	(Canada) S Diez	6	6
ITF	(Italy) R Bonadio	4	2
(Russia) P Kotov	1	6	6
(Italy) M Viola	6	4	3
(France) E Benchetrit	5	0
Alt	(France) S Doumbia	7	6
(Spain) B Zapata Miralles	6	6
(Switzerland) M-A Hüsler	1	3

Second round
8	(Kazakhstan) A Bublik	6	7
Q	(Canada) S Diez	1	5
(Russia) P Kotov	6	2	6
10	(Belgium) K Coppejans	4	6	3
14	(Croatia) V Galović	7^{7}	6
Alt	(France) S Doumbia	6^{5}	2
(Spain) B Zapata Miralles	6	7
2	(Czech Republic) L Rosol	3	5

Third round
8	(Kazakhstan) A Bublik	6^{5}	6	6
(Russia) P Kotov	7^{7}	2	2
14	(Croatia) V Galović	7^{7}	5	6
(Spain) B Zapata Miralles	6^{4}	7	2

Quarterfinals
8	(Kazakhstan) A Bublik	3	6	6
14	(Croatia) V Galović	6	3	4
