= Hungarian Challenger Open =

- 2018 Hungarian Challenger Open

ATP Challenger Tour
- Event name: Hungarian Challenger Open
- Location: Budapest, Hungary
- Venue: BOK Hall
- Category: ATP Challenger Tour
- Surface: Hard (indoor)
- Draw: 32S/32Q/16D
- Prize money: €64,000 + H
- Website: Website

The Hungarian Challenger Open was a professional tennis tournament played on hard courts on the ATP Challenger Tour. It was held annually in Budapest, Hungary from 2016 to 2019.

Starting in 2023, a new tournament is held in Székesfehérvár, Hungary as part of the ATP Challenger Tour under the name Kiskút Open.

== Past finals ==
=== Singles ===
Year	Champion	Runner-up	Score
2016	(Romania) Marius Copil	(Belgium) Steve Darcis	6–4, 6–2
2017	(Austria) Jürgen Melzer	(Hungary) Márton Fucsovics	7–6^{(8–6)}, 6–2
2018	(Canada) Vasek Pospisil	(Spain) Nicola Kuhn	7–6^{(7–3)}, 3–6, 6–3
2019	(Kazakhstan) Alexander Bublik	(Italy) Roberto Marcora	6–0, 6–3

=== Doubles ===
Year	Champions	Runners-up	Score
2016	(Belarus) Aliaksandr Bury (Sweden) Andreas Siljeström	(United States) James Cerretani (Austria) Philipp Oswald	6–4, 7–6^{(7–4)}
2017	(Croatia) Dino Marcan (Austria) Tristan-Samuel Weissborn	(Slovenia) Blaž Kavčič (Croatia) Franko Škugor	6–3, 3–6, [16–14]
2018	(Canada) Félix Auger-Aliassime (Spain) Nicola Kuhn	(Croatia) Marin Draganja (Croatia) Tomislav Draganja	2–6, 6–2, [11–9]
2019	(Germany) Kevin Krawietz (Slovakia) Filip Polášek	(Italy) Filippo Baldi (Switzerland) Luca Margaroli	7–5, 7–6^{(7–5)}
