= Márton Fucsovics =

Hungarian tennis player

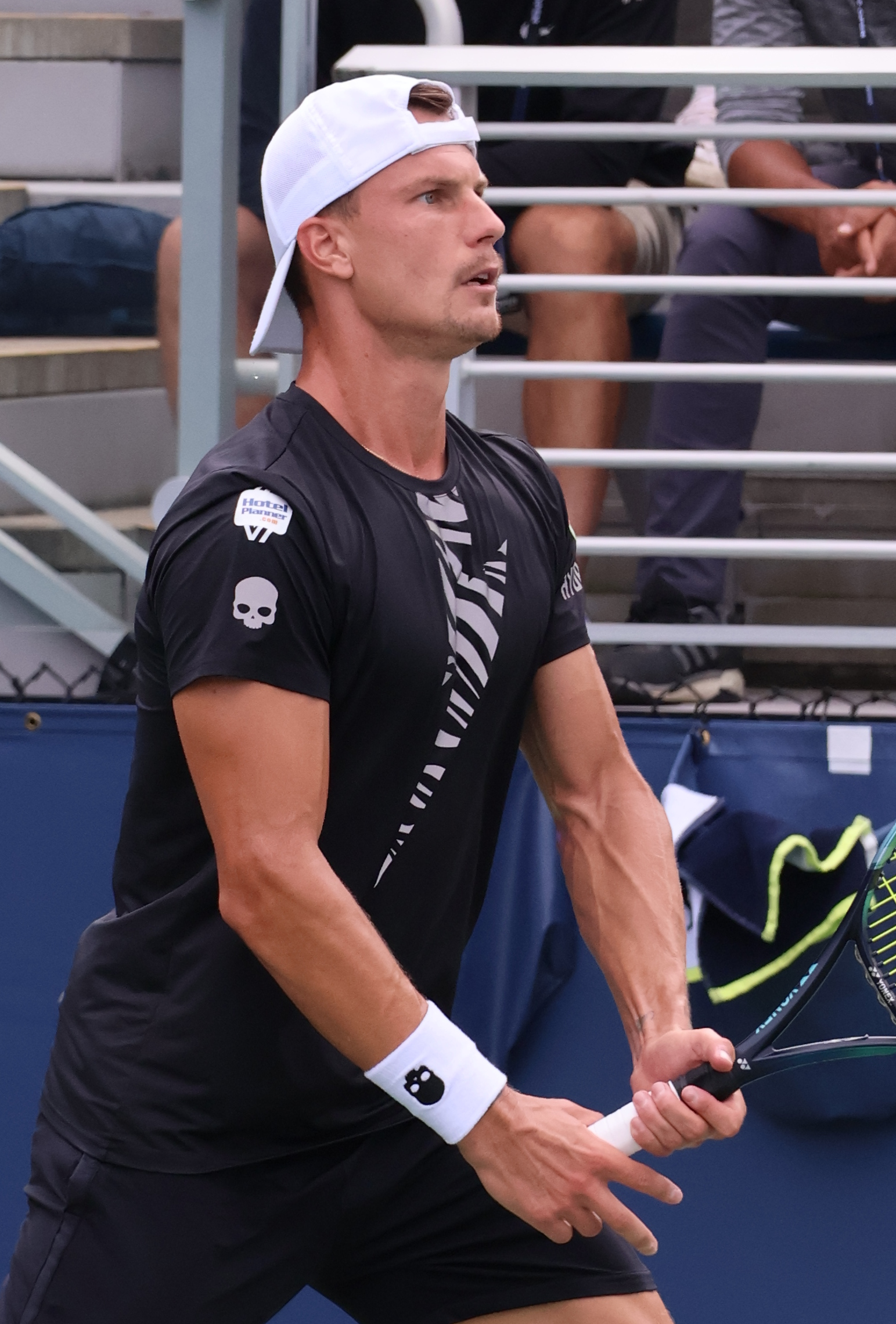
- Fucsovics at the 2023 US Open
- Country (sports): Hungary
- Residence: Nyíregyháza, Hungary
- Born: 8 February 1992 (age 34) Nyíregyháza, Hungary
- Height: 1.88 m (6 ft 2 in)
- Turned pro: 2010
- Plays: Right-handed (two-handed backhand)
- Coach: Péter Nagy, Miklós Palágyi
- Prize money: US $8,960,647

Singles
- Career record: 188–191
- Career titles: 3
- Highest ranking: No. 31 (4 March 2019)
- Current ranking: No. 122 (31 August 2026)

Grand Slam singles results
- Australian Open: 4R (2018, 2020)
- French Open: 4R (2020)
- Wimbledon: QF (2021)
- US Open: 3R (2020)

Other tournaments
- Olympic Games: 1R (2024)

Doubles
- Career record: 21–46
- Career titles: 0
- Highest ranking: No. 189 (22 April 2019)

Grand Slam doubles results
- Australian Open: 2R (2024)
- French Open: 2R (2020, 2022)
- Wimbledon: 2R (2021)
- US Open: 1R (2018, 2021, 2022, 2023)

Other doubles tournaments
- Olympic Games: 1R (2024)

Grand Slam mixed doubles results
- Australian Open: 2R (2019)
- French Open: 2R (2019)

Team competitions
- Davis Cup: 25–14
- Last updated on: 31 August 2026.

Márton Fucsovics (Hungarian: Fucsovics Márton, pronounced [ˈfut͡ʃovit͡ʃ ˈmaːrton]; born 8 February 1992) is a Hungarian professional tennis player. He has a career-high ATP singles ranking of world No. 31 achieved on 4 March 2019 and a doubles ranking of No. 189 achieved on 22 April 2019. He is currently the No. 3 singles player from Hungary.

== Early life ==
Fucsovics started playing tennis at the age of five. He came through the ranks quickly, and at the age of 8, he played in a field 3–4 years older.

In 2003, Fucsovics won his age group National Championship and the Nike Junior Tour. With that, he got the chance to represent Hungary on the World Final in Sun City, South Africa. Fucsovics also showed talent in basketball as a youth, but chose to make tennis his career path.

=== Junior tennis ===
Fucsovics's first major success came in 2009, when he won the US Open Boys' Doubles title, with Hsieh Cheng-peng of Chinese Taipei. In 2010, he reached the semi-final of the Australian Open Boys' singles, and a few months later, he won the Wimbledon Boys' singles, defeating qualifier Benjamin Mitchell in a straight-sets final. Fucsovics did not lose a set throughout the entire tournament. He also participated in the doubles event alongside Czech Libor Salaba, and reached the quarter-finals. Later that year, he also reached the semi-final of the 2010 US Open – Boys' singles, in which he lost to Jack Sock.

Fucsovics was also an integral part of the Hungarian U-18 national tennis team. The team won the prestigious Galea/Valerio Cup in Venice to claim Hungary's first-ever boys' European Summer Cups title. The other members of the team were Máté Zsiga and Levente Gödry.

Fucsovics worked his way to No. 1 in the ITF Junior Rankings in July 2010 and, as a result, entered the Youth Olympics as the tournament's top seed. He suffered a surprise loss, however, in the first round, to eventual quarterfinalist Oliver Golding.

== Career ==
=== 2009–2016: ATP Challenger titles ===
In 2013, Fucsovics won two Challenger titles, the first in May at the Kunming Open and at the Andria Challenger in November.

In 2016, he qualified for his first major, at the US Open of that season, but lost to Nicolás Almagro in straight sets in the first round.

=== 2017: Slam major main draw, top 100 ===
In 2017, Fucsovics won the Ilkley Challenger in singles. That title saw him also earn a wildcard into 2017 Wimbledon Championships main draw, where he lost to the 16th seed Gilles Müller in the opening round. Despite that, he reached a career-high singles ranking of world No. 99, breaking into the top 100 for the first time.

In September 2017, he played a pivotal role in Hungary's promotion to the World Group, winning 3 rubbers against the favourites, Russia.

=== 2018: Major fourth round, ATP title, top 50 ===
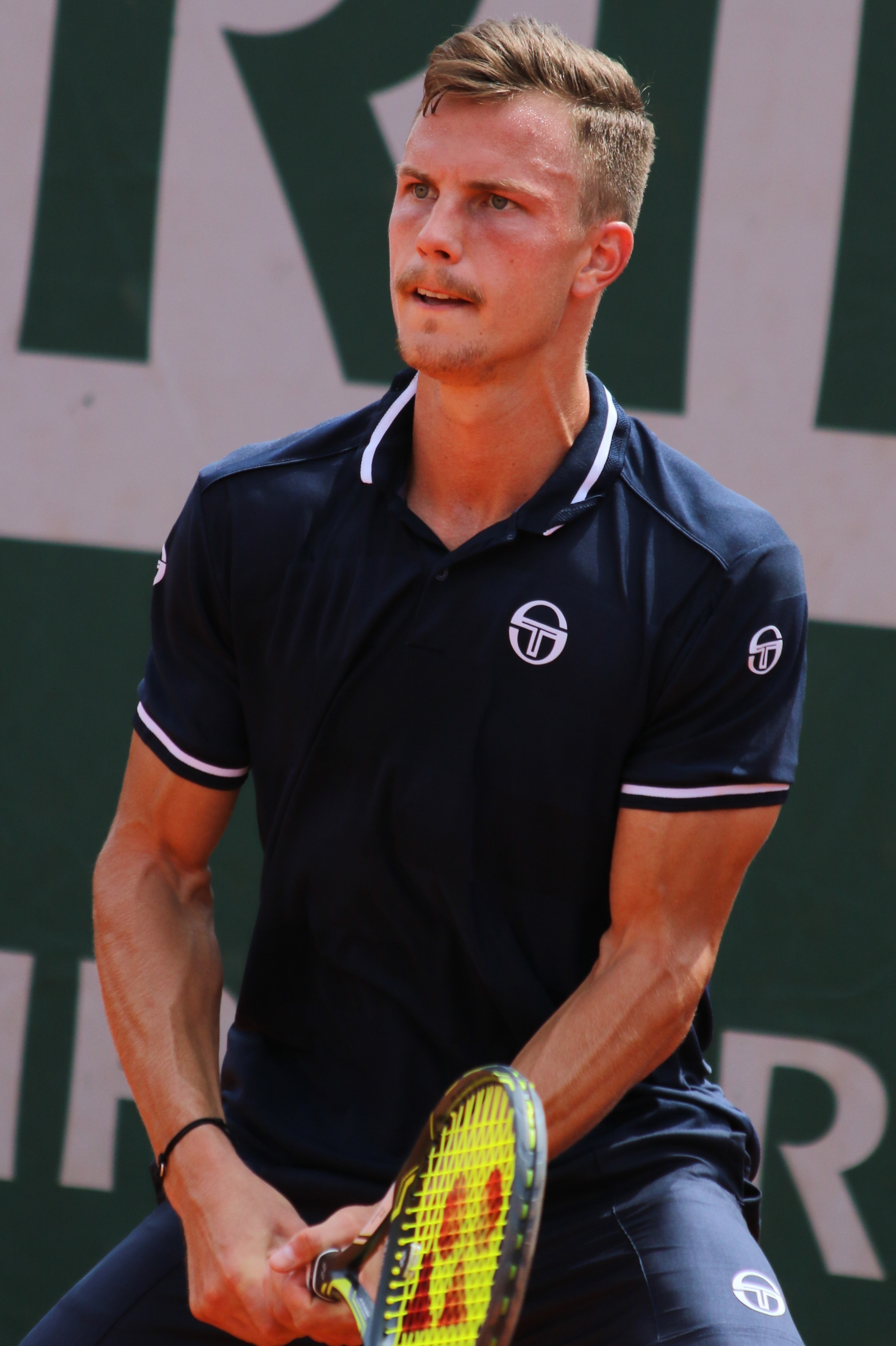
Fucsovics at the 2018 French Open

Fucsovics started his 2018 season at the Tata Open Maharashtra in Pune, India. He lost in the second round to fourth seed Benoît Paire. Seeded sixth at the Canberra Challenger, he reached the final, but he ended up losing to seventh seed Andreas Seppi. Ranked 80 at the Australian Open, he won his first match in a Grand Slam main draw by defeating Radu Albot in the first round. In the second round, he upset 13th seed, Sam Querrey, in four sets. He ended up reaching the fourth round where he fell to world No. 2, five-time champion, and eventual champion, Roger Federer.

Representing Hungary in the Davis Cup tie against Belgium, Fucsovics lost both of his matches to Ruben Bemelmans and David Goffin. Hungary ended up losing the tie to Belgium 2–3. As the top seed at the Hungarian Challenger Open, he made it to the semifinals, where he was defeated by Nicola Kuhn. In March, he competed at the Indian Wells Masters. He was eliminated in the second round by second seed and world No. 3, Marin Čilić. Seeded fourth at the Irving Classic, he reached the semifinals where he was beaten by Matteo Berrettini. In Miami, he lost in the first round to Maximilian Marterer.

Fucsovics started his clay-court season at the Grand Prix Hassan II. He lost in the first round to Malek Jaziri. At the Monte-Carlo Masters, he was defeated in the first round by Daniil Medvedev. Seeded sixth at the Hungarian Open, he was eliminated in the first round by German lucky loser Yannick Maden. At the BMW Open in Munich, he reached the quarterfinals where he lost to Maximilian Marterer. In Rome, he fell in the first round of qualifying to Italian wildcard Filippo Baldi. Fucsovics played one more tournament before Roland Garros. At the Geneva Open, he upset fifth seed, Albert Ramos Viñolas, in the first round. He then upset third seed and two-time defending champion, Stan Wawrinka, in the quarterfinals. In the semifinals, he beat sixth seed, Steve Johnson to reach his first ATP singles final. He won his first ATP singles title by defeating Peter Gojowczyk in the final. Due to him winning the title in Geneva, his ranking improved from 60 to 45. At the French Open, he won his first-round match over Vasek Pospisil. He lost in the second round to 16th seed and world No. 17, Kyle Edmund.

Fucsovics started his grass-court season at the MercedesCup in Stuttgart. He lost in the second round to seventh seed and eventual finalist, Milos Raonic. In Halle, he retired during his first-round match against Philipp Kohlschreiber.

=== 2019: Sofia final, top 40 ===
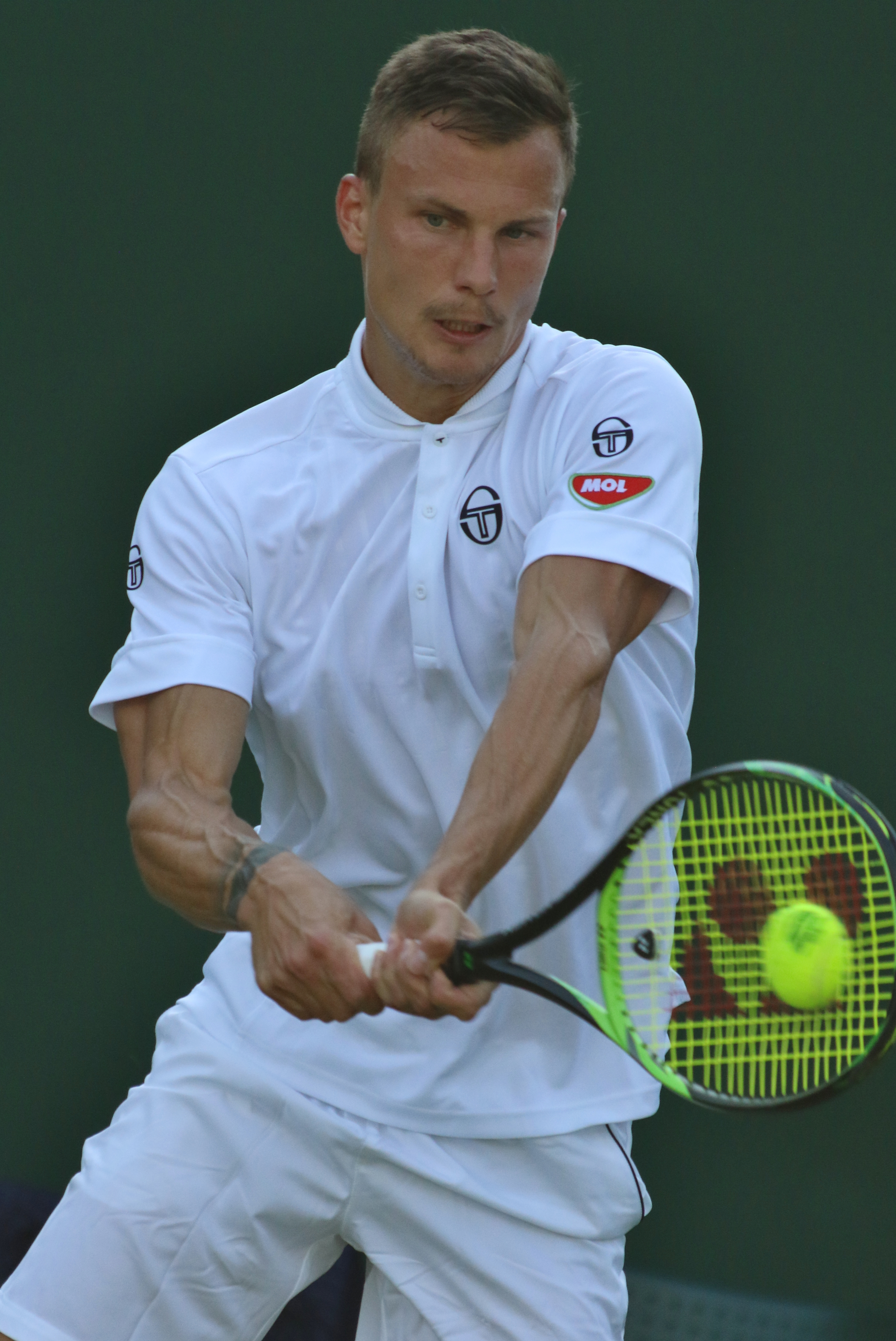
Fucsovics at the 2019 Wimbledon Championships

Fucsovics started his 2019 season at the Qatar ExxonMobil Open. He lost in the second round to world No. 1 and two-time champion, Novak Djokovic. Seeded seventh at the Sydney International, he was defeated in the second round by Australian John Millman. Ranked 38 at the Australian Open, he lost in the second round to 11th seed and world No. 12, Borna Ćorić.

In February, Fucsovics competed at the Sofia Open. He upset the eighth seed, Andreas Seppi, in the first round. He ended up reaching his second ATP singles final where he lost to third seed and world No. 16, Daniil Medvedev. In Rotterdam, he beat ninth seed and world No. 20, Nikoloz Basilashvili, in the second round. He fell in his quarterfinal match to top seed and world No. 7, Kei Nishikori. At the Dubai Championships, he made it to the quarterfinals where he lost to second seed, world No. 7, seven-time champion, and eventual champion, Roger Federer. Seeded 29th at the Indian Wells Masters, he was eliminated in the second round by 2017 finalist Stan Wawrinka. Seeded 29th at the Miami Open, he was beaten in the second round by qualifier Félix Auger-Aliassime, who would end up reaching the semifinals.

Fucsovics started his clay-court season in April at the Monte-Carlo Masters. He defeated 12th seed and world No. 17, Nikoloz Basilashvili, in the first round. He lost in the second round to Cam Norrie. At the Barcelona Open, he was ousted from the tournament in the second round by fifth seed, world No. 8, and last year finalist, Stefanos Tsitsipas. Seeded eighth at the BMW Open, he reached the quarterfinals where he lost to third seed and world No. 19, Marco Cecchinato. In Madrid, he was defeated in the second round by 15th seed and world No. 18, Gaël Monfils. At the Italian Open, he lost in the first round to 14th seed Nikoloz Basilashvili. Seeded fourth and last year champion at the Geneva Open, he lost in the second round to Federico Delbonis. Due to not defending his title, his ranking fell from 38 to 50. At the French Open, he was defeated in the first round by 17th seed and world No. 20, Diego Schwartzman in five sets.

Fucsovics started his grass-court season at the MercedesCup. He beat the fourth seed and world No. 17, Nikoloz Basilashvili, in the second round. He lost in the quarterfinals to sixth seed and world No. 18, Milos Raonic. At the Queen's Club Championships, he lost in the first round to 2017 champion and eventual champion, Feliciano López. Ranked 51 at Wimbledon, he lost in the second round to 12th seed and world No. 10, Fabio Fognini, in five sets.

At the Hamburg Open, Fucsovics was defeated in the second round by top seed and world No. 4, Dominic Thiem. Seeded fifth at the Generali Open Kitzbühel, he lost in the first round to eventual finalist Albert Ramos Viñolas.

Starting his US Open series at the Rogers Cup in Montreal, Fucsovics lost in round one to Cam Norrie. In Cincinnati, he was defeated in the first round of qualifying by Alexei Popyrin. Ranked 64 at the US Open, he was eliminated in the first round by 17th seed and world No. 18, Nikoloz Basilashvili.

After the US Open, Fucsovics played for Hungary in the Davis Cup tie against Ukraine. He won his first match over Illya Marchenko. However, he lost his second match to Sergiy Stakhovsky. Hungary still was able to defeat Ukraine 3–2. At the St. Petersburg Open, he retired during his second-round match against the fourth seed, world No. 15, and eventual finalist, Borna Ćorić, due to hip problems. In Chengdu, he lost in the first round to lucky loser Lloyd Harris. Getting past qualifying at the Erste Bank Open, he retired during his second-round match against second seed and world No. 9, Karen Khachanov. Fucsovics played his final tournament of the season at the Slovak Open. Seeded second, he lost in the second round to Ilya Ivashka.

Fucsovics ended the year ranked No. 70.

=== 2020: Success at Majors: two fourth rounds ===
Fucsovics started his 2020 season at the Qatar ExxonMobil Open. Getting past qualifying, he beat eighth seed, Frances Tiafoe, in the first round. He lost in the quarterfinals to Miomir Kecmanović. As the top seed at the first edition of the Bendigo Challenger, he retired during his second-round match against Andrea Vavassori due to an ankle injury. Ranked 67 at the Australian Open, he upset 13th seed, Denis Shapovalov, in the first round. He ended up reaching the fourth round, where he was defeated by third seed, former world No. 1, and six-time champion, Roger Federer, in four sets.

Making it past qualifying at the Rotterdam Open, Fucsovics was eliminated in the first round by sixth seed and world No. 12, Roberto Bautista Agut. In Marseille, he lost in the first round to Alexander Bublik. At the Dubai Championships, he was beaten in the first round by third seed and world No. 9, Gaël Monfils. Representing Hungary in the Davis Cup tie against Belgium, he wom both of his matches beating Kimmer Coppejans and Ruben Bemelmans. In the end, Hungary won the tie over Belgium 3–2. The ATP tour canceled all tournaments from March 12 through July due to the Coronavirus pandemic.

When the ATP tour resumed tournament play in August, Fucsovics competed at the Western & Southern Open. This event usually takes place in Cincinnati, but this year, it was held at the USTA Billie Jean King National Tennis Center in New York City in order to reduce unnecessary player travel by centralizing the tournament and the subsequent US Open in the same venue. Making it through qualifying, he beat 14th seed and world No. 19, Grigor Dimitrov, in the second round in three sets. He lost in the third round to Filip Krajinović. Ranked 66 at the US Open, he upset 14th seed, world No. 20, and last year semifinalist, Grigor Dimitrov, in the second round. He fell in the third round to American Frances Tiafoe.

Ranked 63 at the French Open, Fucsovics stunned fourth seed and world No. 5, Daniil Medvedev, in the first round to earn his first career top-10 victory. He ended up making it to the fourth round where he lost to 13th seed and world No. 12, Andrey Rublev.

After Roland Garros, Fucsovics played at the Bett1Hulks Indoors. Here, he was defeated in the first round by Gilles Simon. Getting past qualifying at the Paris Masters, he was ousted from the tournament in the first round by 15th seed, world No. 24, and 2018 finalist, Borna Ćorić. His final tournament of the season was at the Sofia Open. Last year's finalist at this event, he lost in the first round to eventual champion Jannik Sinner.

Fucsovics ended the year ranked No. 55.

=== 2021: First major quarterfinal, ATP 500 final ===
Fucsovics began his 2021 season at the first edition of the Murray River Open. Seeded 16th, he lost in the second round to Egor Gerasimov in three sets. Ranked 55 at the Australian Open, he pulled off a second-round stunner by beating 17th seed, world No. 18, and 2014 champion, Stan Wawrinka. He saved three match points to complete the upset. He was defeated in the third round by 14th seed Milos Raonic.

In March, Fucsovics played at the Rotterdam Open. Getting past qualifying, he reached the biggest final of his career; he ended up losing in the championship match to fourth seed and world No. 8, Andrey Rublev. Despite losing in the final, he returned to the top 50 in the rankings. At the Qatar ExxonMobil Open, he was forced to withdraw from his quarterfinal match against third seed and defending champion, Andrey Rublev, due to a lower back injury. In Dubai, he ousted sixth seed and world No. 15, Pablo Carreño Busta, in the second round. He then beat 11th seed and world No. 26, Dušan Lajović, in the third round. He fell in the quarterfinals to second seed Andrey Rublev. Seeded 29th at the Miami Open, he lost in the third round to fourth seed Andrey Rublev.

Fucsovics started his clay-court season at the Monte-Carlo Masters. He was eliminated in the first round by Lorenzo Sonego. In Madrid, he lost in the first round to Alexander Bublik. At the Italian Open, he was defeated in the second round by fourth seed Dominic Thiem. Fucsovics played one more tournament before the French Open, which was the Geneva Open. He was ousted from the tournament in the second round by Swiss wildcard Dominic Stricker. Ranked 44 at Roland Garros, he was beaten in the second round by 27th seed and world No. 29, Fabio Fognini.

After the French Open, Fucsovics turned his attention to the grass-court season. At the Stuttgart Open, he lost in the first round to sixth seed and world No. 32, Ugo Humbert. In Eastbourne, he was defeated in the second round by lucky loser Kwon Soon-woo. Ranked 48 at Wimbledon, he upset 19th seed and world No. 23, Jannik Sinner, in the first round. In the third round, he upset ninth seed and world No. 11, Diego Schwartzman. In the fourth round, he stunned fifth seed and world No. 7, Andrey Rublev, to reach the quarterfinals for the first time in his career. He became the first Hungarian man to reach the Wimbledon quarterfinals since József Asbóth in 1948 and the first Hungarian man in a Grand Slam quarterfinal since Balázs Taróczy at the 1981 French Open. He lost in the quarterfinals to world No. 1, five-time champion, and eventual champion, Novak Djokovic. With this successful run, he returned to the top 40 in rankings at world No. 39 on 13 July 2021.

In August, Fucsovics competed at the Western & Southern Open in Cincinnati. He was defeated in the first round by 12th seed and world No. 17, Félix Auger-Aliassime. Seeded fourth at the Winston-Salem Open, he lost in the third round to 15th seed and rising star, Carlos Alcaraz, in three sets. Ranked 41 at the US Open, he fell in the first round to Andreas Seppi, despite having five match points in the fifth-set tie-breaker.

At the Moselle Open, Fucsovics lost in the first round to fifth seed and world No. 24, Lorenzo Sonego. At the first edition of the San Diego Open, he was eliminated in the first round by Grigor Dimitrov. In Indian Wells, he lost in the first round to Gianluca Mager. At the European Open in Antwerp, he beat fourth seed and world No. 20, Roberto Bautista Agut, in the second round. In the quarterfinals, he was defeated by seventh seed and world No. 32, Lloyd Harris. At the Vienna Open, he was ousted from the tournament in the first round by Cam Norrie. At the Paris Masters, he pushed world No. 1, five-time champion, and eventual champion, Novak Djokovic, to three sets, but he ended up losing the match. Seeded seventh at the Stockholm Open, he lost in the second round to Botic van de Zandschulp. In his final tournament of the season, he represented Hungary in the Davis Cup tie against Australia. He played one match and lost to Alex de Minaur in a three-set thriller.

Fucsovics ended the year ranked No. 40.

=== 2022: Mixed results, sixth top 100 year-end ===
Fucsovics started his 2022 season at the Adelaide International 1. Seeded fifth, he lost in the first round to qualifier Egor Gerasimov. Seeded eighth at the Adelaide International 2, he was defeated in the second round by qualifier Corentin Moutet. Ranked 35 at the Australian Open, he fell in the first round to Dušan Lajović in five sets.

As a previous year finalist at the Rotterdam Open, Fucsovics reached the quarterfinals, where he was ousted by second seed and defending champion, Andrey Rublev, in a rematch from last year's championship match. In Doha, he upset eighth seed, Lloyd Harris, in the first round. He ended up losing in the quarterfinals to third seed, world No. 22, defending champion, and eventual finalist, Nikoloz Basilashvili. At the Dubai Championships, he was eliminated in the first round by sixth seed and world No. 14, Denis Shapovalov. Playing for Hungary in the Davis Cup tie against Australia, he defeated Thanasi Kokkinakis in his first match. In the second match, he lost to Alex de Minaur. In the end, Australia got the win over Hungary 3–2. After Davis Cup, he competed at the Indian Wells Masters. He lost in the first round to American Mackenzie McDonald. In Miami, he was defeated in the second round by 14th seed, rising star, and eventual champion, Carlos Alcaraz.

Starting his clay-court season at the Monte-Carlo Masters, Fucsovics lost in the second round to 12th seed and world No. 16, Diego Schwartzman. In Barcelona, he beat 15th seed, Federico Delbonis, in the second round. He was defeated in the third round by fourth seed and world No. 10, Cameron Norrie. At the Madrid Open, he reached the final round of qualifying and lost to Maxime Cressy. Fucsovics retired during his final round of qualifying match against Dušan Lajović at the Italian Open. At the French Open, he was beaten in the second round by 20th seed and world No. 23, Marin Čilić, who would end up reaching the semifinals.

Fucsovics started his grass court season at the BOSS Open in Stuttgart. He upset the third seed and world No. 13, Hubert Hurkacz, in the second round. He retired during his quarterfinal match against Nick Kyrgios due to a lower back injury. At the Halle Open, he retired during his first-round match against seventh seed Roberto Bautista Agut. Ranked No. 59 and previous year quarterfinalist at Wimbledon, he lost in the first round to Alexander Bublik. After Wimbledon, in which he lost in the first round, his ranking fell from No. 59 to No. 97 as he was unable to defend his quarterfinal points due to the "no points awarded to all players" ATP policy related to the Russian and Belarusian players ban.

Fucsovics played one warm-up tournament in the lead-up to the US Open. At the Winston-Salem Open, he lost in the final round of qualifying to Jason Kubler. However, due to the withdrawal of Sebastián Báez, he got entry as a lucky loser into the main draw. He lost in the first round to Tseng Chun-hsin. Ranked No. 98 at the US Open, he won his first round match when his opponent, 30th seed and world No. 32, American Maxime Cressy retired injured. He was defeated in the second round by Alejandro Davidovich Fokina in a five-set match, which included a fifth-set super tiebreaker.

After the US Open, Fucsovics represented Hungary in the Davis Cup World Group I tie against Ukraine. He won both of his matches by beating Viacheslav Bielinskyi and Illya Beloborodko. Hungary won the tie over Ukraine 3–1 to move on to the qualifying round. At the Moselle Open, he lost in the final round of qualifying to Grégoire Barrère.

He finished the year ranked No. 88 on 5 December 2022 after winning the 2022 Slovak Open and reaching the semifinals of the 2022 Internazionali di Tennis Castel del Monte in his last two tournaments of the season.

=== 2023: Major third and Masters fourth rounds ===
Fucsovics started the season strong, winning his sixth Challenger title at the 2023 Canberra Tennis International where he defeated in the final Swiss Leandro Riedi, who came from a 15-match unbeaten streak. At the Australian Open, after beating Federico Coria and Lloyd Harris, the Hungarian reached the third round, where he was defeated by world No. 16 Jannik Sinner in five sets despite winning the first two of them. At the 2023 BNP Paribas Open, he reached the fourth round, defeating J. J. Wolf, 16th seed Alex de Minaur in a less than 90 minutes match, and Alex Molčan. As a result, he moved back into the top 75 in the rankings.

At the 2023 Italian Open, he reached the third round for the first time at this Masters 1000, defeating Filip Krajinović and upsetting 17th seed Alex de Minaur.

At the 2023 BOSS Open he reached back-to-back quarterfinals as a qualifier defeating Denis Shapovalov and Wu Yibing. Next he defeated second seed and world No. 8 Taylor Fritz to reach the semifinals. He lost to Frances Tiafoe in straight sets. As a result, he moved 20 positions up in the top 70.

=== 2024–2025: Wimbledon third round, Two titles ===
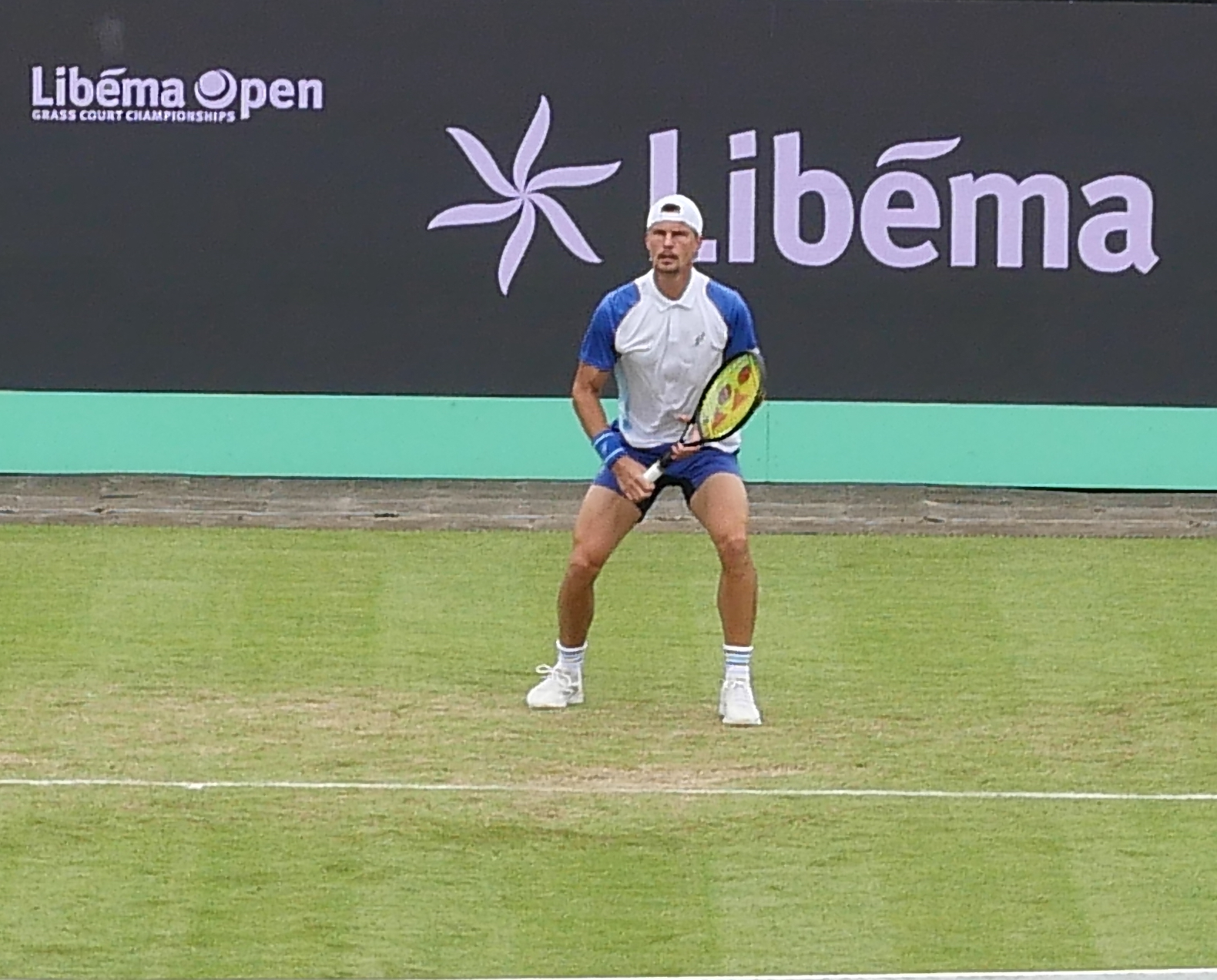
Fucsovics at the 2026 Libéma Open

At the 2024 Țiriac Open in Bucharest, he reached his fourth ATP final and first since 2021 with wins over Valentin Vacherot, second seed Tallon Griekspoor, Corentin Moutet and fourth seed Alejandro Tabilo. He defeated fifth seed Mariano Navone to win his first ATP title since 2018 and second in his career. As a result, he returned to the top 55 in the rankings on 22 April 2024. However, after his title, he was only able to win two more matches at the ATP level until the end of the year.

His first round loss to Rafael Nadal in the Paris 2024 Summer Olympics would be the final non-exhibition victory of Nadal's career, before retiring in November 2024.

At the 2025 Wimbledon Championships, he entered the main draw as a lucky loser and reached the third round. Fucsovics became the first lucky loser in the Open Era to reach the third round after two five-set wins at Wimbledon.

Fucsovics won his third ATP Tour title at the 2025 Winston-Salem Open, defeating Botic van de Zandschulp in the final.

== Performance timelines ==
Key
W	F	SF	QF	#R	RR	Q#	P#	DNQ	A	Z#	PO	G	S	B	NMS	NTI	P	NH

(W) winner; (F) finalist; (SF) semifinalist; (QF) quarterfinalist; (#R) rounds 4, 3, 2, 1; (RR) round-robin stage; (Q#) qualification round; (P#) preliminary round; (DNQ) did not qualify; (A) absent; (Z#) Davis/Fed Cup Zonal Group (with number indication) or (PO) play-off; (G) gold, (S) silver or (B) bronze Olympic/Paralympic medal; (NMS) not a Masters tournament; (NTI) not a Tier I tournament; (P) postponed; (NH) not held; (SR) strike rate (events won / competed); (W–L) win–loss record.
To avoid confusion and double counting, these charts are updated at the conclusion of a tournament or when the player's participation has ended.

=== Singles ===
Current through the 2026 French Open.

Tournament	2010	2011	2012	2013	2014	2015	2016	2017	2018	2019	2020	2021	2022	2023	2024	2025	2026	SR	W–L	Win %
Grand Slam tournaments
Australian Open	A	A	A	A	Q3	Q2	Q1	Q1	4R	2R	4R	3R	1R	3R	1R	Q1	2R	0 / 8	12–8	60%
French Open	A	A	A	A	Q1	Q2	Q2	Q2	2R	1R	4R	2R	2R	2R	1R	2R	1R	0 / 9	8–9	47%
Wimbledon	A	Q2	A	Q1	Q3	Q3	Q1	1R	1R	2R	NH	QF	1R	3R	1R	3R	3R	0 / 8	11–9	53%
US Open	A	A	A	Q1	Q2	Q2	1R	1R	1R	1R	3R	1R	2R	2R	1R	1R		0 / 10	4–10	29%
Win–loss	0–0	0–0	0–0	0–0	0–0	0–0	0–1	0–2	4–4	2–4	8–3	7–4	2–4	6–4	0–4	3–3	3–3	0 / 35	35–36	49%
ATP Masters 1000
Indian Wells Open	A	A	A	A	A	A	A	Q1	2R	2R	NH	1R	1R	4R	A	A		0 / 5	4–5	44%
Miami Open	A	A	A	A	Q1	A	A	A	1R	2R	NH	3R	2R	2R	2R	A		0 / 6	4–6	40%
Monte-Carlo Masters	A	A	A	A	A	A	A	A	1R	2R	NH	1R	2R	2R	A	A		0 / 5	2–5	29%
Madrid Open	A	A	A	A	A	A	A	A	A	2R	NH	1R	Q2	1R	A	Q1		0 / 3	1–3	25%
Italian Open	A	A	A	A	A	A	A	A	Q1	1R	A	2R	Q2	3R	1R	Q2		0 / 4	3–4	43%
Canadian Open	A	A	A	A	A	A	A	A	2R	1R	NH	A	A	A	A	A		0 / 2	1–2	33%
Cincinnati Open	A	A	A	A	A	A	A	A	3R	Q1	3R	1R	A	Q1	Q2	A		0 / 3	4–3	57%
Shanghai Masters	A	A	A	A	A	A	A	A	2R	A	NH			3R	A	1R		0 / 3	3–3	50%
Paris Masters	A	A	A	A	A	A	A	A	2R	A	1R	2R	A	1R	A	A		0 / 4	2–3	40%
Win–loss	0–0	0–0	0–0	0–0	0–0	0–0	0–0	0–0	6–6	2–6	2–2	3–7	2–3	8–7	1–2	1–1		0 / 34	24–34	41%
Career statistics
	2010	2011	2012	2013	2014	2015	2016	2017	2018	2019	2020	2021	2022	2023	2024	2025	2026	Career		
Tournaments	0	0	1	1	0	2	2	8	24	25	11	24	19	20	18	13	11	Total: 179		
Titles	0	0	0	0	0	0	0	0	1	0	0	0	0	0	1	1	0	Total: 3		
Finals	0	0	0	0	0	0	0	0	1	1	0	1	0	0	1	1	0	Total: 5		
Overall win–loss	0–1	1–0	2–3	2–3	0–0	6–2	2–3	9–8	25–24	22–26	14–11	26–24	16–19	22–21	13–17	19–13	6–11	3 / 179	185–186	50%
Win (%)	0%	100%	40%	40%	–	75%	40%	53%	52%	46%	56%	51%	46%	51%	43%	59%	33%	Total: 50%		
Year-end ranking	1432	577	440	181	161	214	158	85	36	70	55	40	88	47	91	55		$8,518,917		

== ATP Tour finals ==
=== Singles: 5 (3 titles, 2 runner-ups) ===
Legend Grand Slam (–) ATP 1000 (–) ATP 500 (0–1) ATP 250 (3–1)	Finals by surface Hard (1–2) Clay (2–0) Grass (–)	Finals by setting Outdoor (3–0) Indoor (0–2)

Result	W–L	Date	Tournament	Tier	Surface	Opponent	Score
Win	1–0	May 2018	Geneva Open, Switzerland	ATP 250	Clay	(Germany) Peter Gojowczyk	6–2, 6–2
Loss	1–1	Feb 2019	Sofia Open, Bulgaria	ATP 250	Hard (i)	(Russia) Daniil Medvedev	4–6, 3–6
Loss	1–2	Mar 2021	Rotterdam Open, Netherlands	ATP 500	Hard (i)	(Russia) Andrey Rublev	6–7^{(4–7)}, 4–6
Win	2–2	Apr 2024	Țiriac Open, Romania	ATP 250	Clay	(Argentina) Mariano Navone	6–4, 7–5
Win	3–2	Aug 2025	Winston-Salem Open, US	ATP 250	Hard	(Netherlands) Botic van de Zandschulp	6–3, 7–6^{(7–3)}

== ATP Challenger Tour finals ==
=== Singles: 12 (7 titles, 5 runner-ups) ===
Legend ATP Challenger Tour (7–5)	Finals by surface Hard (4–2) Clay (2–3) Grass (1–0)

Result	W–L	Date	Tournament	Tier	Surface	Opponent	Score
Win	1–0	May 2013	China International Challenger, China	Challenger	Clay	(United Kingdom) James Ward	7–5, 3–6, 6–3
Win	2–0	Nov 2013	Internazionali di Castel del Monte, Italy	Challenger	Hard (i)	(Germany) Dustin Brown	6–3, 6–4
Loss	2–1	May 2014	Neckarcup, Germany	Challenger	Clay	(Germany) Jan-Lennard Struff	2–6, 6–7^{(5–7)}
Loss	2–2	Jul 2014	Astra Tennis Cup, Italy	Challenger	Clay	(Slovenia) Aljaž Bedene	6–2, 6–7^{(4–7)}, 4–6
Loss	2–3	Jun 2016	Czech Open, Czech Republic	Challenger	Clay	(Kazakhstan) Mikhail Kukushkin	1–6, 2–6
Loss	2–4	Feb 2017	Hungarian Open, Hungary	Challenger	Hard (i)	(Austria) Jürgen Melzer	6–7^{(6–8)}, 2–6
Win	3–4	Jun 2017	Internazionali Città di Vicenza, Italy	Challenger	Clay	(Serbia) Laslo Djere	4–6, 7–6^{(9–7)}, 6–2
Win	4–4	Jun 2017	Ilkley Trophy, UK	Challenger	Grass	(Australia) Alex Bolt	6–1, 6–4
Loss	4–5	Jan 2018	Canberra Challenger, Australia	Challenger	Hard	(Italy) Andreas Seppi	7–5, 4–6, 3–6
Win	5–5	Nov 2022	Slovak Open, Slovakia	Challenger	Hard (i)	(Hungary) Fábián Marozsán	6–2, 6–4
Win	6–5	Jan 2023	Canberra Tennis International, Australia	Challenger	Hard	(Switzerland) Leandro Riedi	7–5, 6–4
Win	7–5	Feb 2025	Bahrain Challenger, Bahrain	Challenger	Hard	(Italy) Andrea Vavassori	6–3, 6–7^{(3–7)}, 6–4

=== Doubles: 1 (runner-up) ===
Legend ATP Challenger Tour (0–1)

Result	W–L	Date	Tournament	Tier	Surface	Partner	Opponents	Score
Loss	0–1	May 2017	Garden Open, Italy	Challenger	Clay	(Belgium) Kimmer Coppejans	(Germany) Andreas Mies (Germany) Oscar Otte	6–4, 6–7^{(12–14)}, [8–10]

== ITF Tour finals ==
=== Singles: 3 (3 runner-ups) ===
Legend ITF Futures (0–3)

Result	W–L	Date	Tournament	Tier	Surface	Opponent	Score
Loss	0–1	Aug 2012	F3 Tatranská Lomnica, Slovakia	Futures	Clay	(Czech Republic) Jaroslav Pospíšil	4–6, 5–7
Loss	0–2	Sep 2012	F8 Toronto, Canada	Futures	Hard	(South Africa) Fritz Wolmarans	3–6, 6–7^{(3–7)}
Loss	0–3	Jan 2013	F1 Bagnoles-de-l'Orne, France	Futures	Clay (i)	(Germany) Tim Pütz	0–6, 1–4 ret.

=== Doubles: 3 (3 titles) ===
Legend ITF Futures (3–0)

Result	W–L	Date	Tournament	Tier	Surface	Partner	Opponents	Score
Win	1–0	Apr 2012	F3 Fällanden, Switzerland	Futures	Carpet (i)	(New Zealand) Marcus Daniell	(Switzerland) Adrian Bodmer (Austria) Philipp Oswald	6–7^{(3–7)}, 6–3, [10–8]
Win	2–0	Sep 2012	F8 Toronto, Canada	Futures	Hard	(Croatia) Ante Pavić	(United States) Chase Buchanan (United States) Tennys Sandgren	6–2, 6–4
Win	3–0	Dec 2012	F10 Oujda, Morocco	Futures	Clay	(Republic of Ireland) Daniel Glancy	(Italy) Riccardo Bellotti (Austria) Dominic Thiem	6–2, 6–3

== Best Grand Slam results details ==
	Australian Open			
2018 Australian Open
Round	Opponent	Rank	Score	MFR
1R	(Moldova) Radu Albot	No. 87	6–2, 6–3, 4–6, 7–5	No. 80
2R	(United States) Sam Querrey (13)	No. 13	6–4, 7–6^{(8–6)}, 4–6, 6–2	No. 80
3R	(Argentina) Nicolás Kicker	No. 93	6–3, 6–3, 6–2	No. 80
4R	(Switzerland) Roger Federer (2)	No. 2	4–6, 6–7^{(3–7)}, 2–6	No. 80
2020 Australian Open
Round	Opponent	Rank	Score	MFR
1R	(Canada) Denis Shapovalov (13)	No. 13	6–3, 6–7^{(7–9)}, 6–1, 7–6^{(7–3)}	No. 67
2R	(Italy) Jannik Sinner	No. 82	6–4, 6–4, 6–3	No. 67
3R	(United States) Tommy Paul	No. 80	6–1, 6–1, 6–4	No. 67
4R	(Switzerland) Roger Federer (3)	No. 3	6–4, 1–6, 2–6, 2–6	No. 67

	French Open			
2020 French Open
Round	Opponent	Rank	Score	MFR
1R	(Russia) Daniil Medvedev (4)	No. 5	6–4, 7–6^{(7–3)}, 2–6, 6–1	No. 67
2R	(Spain) Albert Ramos Viñolas	No. 44	7–6^{(7–2)}, 6–3, 7–5	No. 67
3R	(Brazil) Thiago Monteiro	No. 84	7–5, 6–1, 6–3	No. 67
4R	(Russia) Andrey Rublev (13)	No. 12	7–6^{(7–4)}, 5–7, 4–6, 6–7^{(3–7)}	No. 67

	Wimbledon Championships			
2021 Wimbledon
Round	Opponent	Rank	Score	MFR
1R	(Italy) Jannik Sinner (19)	No. 23	5–7, 6–3, 7–5, 6–3	No. 48
2R	(Czech Republic) Jiří Veselý	No. 72	6–3, 5–4 ret.	No. 48
3R	(Argentina) Diego Schwartzman (9)	No. 11	6–3, 6–3, 6–7^{(6–8)}, 6–4	No. 48
4R	(Russia) Andrey Rublev (5)	No. 7	6–3, 4–6, 4–6, 6–0, 6–3	No. 48
QF	(Serbia) Novak Djokovic (1)	No. 1	3–6, 4–6, 4–6	No. 48

	US Open			
2020 US Open
Round	Opponent	Rank	Score	MFR
1R	(Bolivia) Hugo Dellien	No. 97	6–3, 6–3, 6–1	No. 66
2R	(Bulgaria) Grigor Dimitrov (14)	No. 20	6–7^{(5–7)}, 7–6^{(7–4)}, 3–6, 6–4, 6–1	No. 66
3R	(United States) Frances Tiafoe	No. 82	2–6, 3–6, 2–6	No. 66

== Wins over top 10 players ==
- Fucsovics has a 4–35 record against players who were, at the time the match was played, ranked in the top 10.

Season	2020	2021	2022	2023	2024	2025	2026	Total
Wins	1	1	0	1	0	0	1	4

#	Player	Rk	Event	Surface	Rd	Score	Rk	Ref
2020
1.	(Russia) Daniil Medvedev	5	French Open, France	Clay	1R	6–4, 7–6^{(7–3)}, 2–6, 6–1	63	
2021
2.	(Russia) Andrey Rublev	7	Wimbledon, United Kingdom	Grass	4R	6–3, 4–6, 4–6, 6–0, 6–3	48	
2023
3.	(United States) Taylor Fritz	8	Stuttgart Open, Germany	Grass	QF	6–4, 7–5	86	
2026
4.	(Italy) Lorenzo Musetti	5	Indian Wells Open, United States	Hard	2R	7–5, 6–1	56	

== Davis Cup ==
=== Participations: (32 victories, 20 defeats) ===
Group membership World Group (1–3) Qualifying Round (3–4) WG Play-off (3–0) Group I (9–3) Group II (12–10) Group III (4–0) Group IV (0–0)	Matches by surface Hard (13–11) Clay (17–7) Grass (0–0) Carpet (2–2)	Matches by type Singles (24–13) Doubles (8–7)

- ▲ ▼ indicates the outcome of the Davis Cup match followed by the score, date, place of event, the zonal classification and its phase, and the court surface.

Rubber outcome	No.	Rubber	Match type (partner if any)	Opponent nation	Opponent player(s)	Score
▼1–4; 5–7 March 2010; Coral Tennis Club, Tallinn, Estonia; Europe/Africa Zone Group II first round; hard (i) surface
Defeat	1	III	Doubles (with Kornél Bardóczky)	Estonia	Mait Künnap / Jürgen Zopp	3–6, 6–2, 5–7, 7–5, 8–10
Defeat	2	V	Singles (dead rubber)	Estonia	Vladimir Ivanov	4–6, 6–7^{(5–7)}
▲5–0; 4–6 March 2011; National Tennis Centre, Nicosia, Cyprus; Europe/Africa Zone Group II first round; hard surface
Victory	3	V	Singles (dead rubber)	Cyprus	Philippos Tsangaridis	6–4, 6–3
▲3–2; 8–10 July 2011; Gödöllő Kiskastély, Gödöllő, Hungary; Europe/Africa Zone Group II second round; clay surface
Defeat	4	III	Doubles (with Kornél Bardóczky)	Belarus	Uladzimir Ignatik / Max Mirnyi	5–7, 7–6^{(7–4)}, 7–6^{(7–2)}, 1–6, 4–6
▲3–2; 10–12 February 2012; Városi Sportcsarnok, Szeged, Hungary; Europe/Africa Zone Group II first round; carpet (i) surface
Victory	5	II	Singles	(Republic of Ireland) Ireland	Conor Niland	7–6^{(7–4)}, 6–4, 6–7^{(3–7)}, 2–6, 6–2
Defeat	6	V	Singles (dead rubber)	(Republic of Ireland) Ireland	Sam Barry	6–4, 3–6, 2–6
▼2–3; 6–8 April 2012; Bujtosi Szabadidő Csarnok, Nyíregyháza, Hungary; Europe/Africa Zone Group II second round; carpet (i) surface
Victory	7	I	Singles	Latvia	Ernests Gulbis	6–7^{(7–9)}, 6–3, 6–4, 4–6, 6–3
Defeat	8	V	Singles	Latvia	Andis Juška	6–7^{(8–10)}, 6–7^{(2–7)}, 4–6
▼2–3; 1–3 February 2013; Manejul de Atletica Usoara, Chișinău, Moldova; Europe/Africa Zone Group II first round; hard (i) surface
Defeat	9	I	Singles	Moldova	Maxim Dubarenco	6–3, 3–6, 4–6, 4–6
Victory	10	III	Doubles (with Levente Gödry)	Moldova	Radu Albot / Andrei Ciumac	6–3, 6–2, 6–2
Victory	11	IV	Singles	Moldova	Radu Albot	1–6, 6–4, 6–1, 6–1
▼1–4; 5–7 April 2013; Budapesti Elektromos SE Csarnok, Budapest, Hungary; Europe/Africa Zone Group II relegation play-off; hard (i) surface
Defeat	12	II	Singles	Luxembourg	Gilles Müller	3–6, 4–6, 0–6
Defeat	13	III	Doubles (with Levente Gödry)	Luxembourg	Gilles Müller / Mike Scheidweiler	6–4, 2–6, 3–6, 0–6
▲3–0; 7 May 2014; Gellért Szabadidőközpont, Szeged, Hungary; Europe/Africa Zone Group III Pool A round robin; clay surface
Victory	14	II	Singles	Armenia	Mikayel Avetisyan	6–0, 6–1
Victory	15	III	Doubles (with Levente Gödry) (dead rubber)	Armenia	Ashot Gevorgyan / Sedrak Khachatryan	6–2, 6–0
▲3–0; 8 May 2014; Gellért Szabadidőközpont, Szeged, Hungary; Europe/Africa Zone Group III Pool A round robin; clay surface
Victory	16	II	Singles	Liechtenstein	Vital Flurin Leuch	6–0, 6–1
▲2–0; 10 May 2014; Gellért Szabadidőközpont, Szeged, Hungary; Europe/Africa Zone Group III promotional play-off; clay surface
Victory	17	II	Singles	(Georgia (country)) Georgia	Aleksandre Metreveli	6–1, 6–1
▲4–1; 6–8 March 2015; City University Hall, Győr, Hungary; Europe/Africa Zone Group II first round; hard (i) surface
Victory	18	II	Singles	Moldova	Andrei Ciumac	6–0, 6–2, 6–3
Victory	19	III	Doubles (with Levente Gödry)	Moldova	Radu Albot / Andrei Ciumac	7–6^{(7–4)}, 3–6, 4–6, 7–6^{(8–6)}, 8–6
Victory	20	IV	Singles	Moldova	Radu Albot	6–2, 6–1, 6–2
▲3–2; 17–19 July 2015; Siófok KC, Siófok, Hungary; Europe/Africa Zone Group II second round; clay surface
Victory	21	I	Singles	Bosnia and Herzegovina	Tomislav Brkić	6–2, 6–3, 3–6, 4–6, 6–3
Defeat	22	III	Doubles (with Levente Gödry)	Bosnia and Herzegovina	Mirza Bašić / Amer Delić	6–3, 6–7^{(8–10)}, 4–6, 0–6
Victory	23	IV	Singles	Bosnia and Herzegovina	Mirza Bašić	6–7^{(3–7)}, 6–1, 6–3, 6–2
▲3–2; 18–20 September 2015; Bulgarian National Tennis Center, Sofia, Bulgaria; Europe/Africa Zone Group II promotional play-off; clay surface
Victory	24	II	Singles	Bulgaria	Dimitar Kuzmanov	6–3, 6–1, 6–1
Defeat	25	III	Doubles (with Levente Gödry)	Bulgaria	Tihomir Grozdanov / Alexandar Lazov	6–2, 6–7^{(3–7)}, 4–6, 6–4, 1–6
Victory	26	IV	Singles	Bulgaria	Alexandar Lazov	6–3, 6–4, 6–2
▲3–2; 4–6 March 2016; Heroes' Square, Budapest, Hungary; Europe/Africa Zone Group I first round; clay surface
Victory	27	II	Singles	Israel	Amir Weintraub	6–4, 6–2, 7–5
Victory	28	III	Doubles (with Levente Gödry)	Israel	Jonathan Erlich / Dudi Sela	7–6^{(7–2)}, 3–6, 7–6^{(7–5)}, 7–6^{(9–7)}
▼0–3; 15–17 July 2016; Europe Tennis Center, Budapest, Hungary; Europe/Africa Zone Group I second round; clay surface
Defeat	29	II	Singles	Slovakia	Jozef Kovalík	7–6^{(7–5)}, 4–6, 6–7^{(5–7)}, 1–6
Defeat	30	III	Doubles (with Levente Gödry)	Slovakia	Andrej Martin / Igor Zelenay	2–6, 2–6, 3–6
▲3–1; 3–5 February 2017; Aegon Arena, Bratislava, Slovakia; Europe/Africa Zone Group I second round; hard (i) surface
Victory	31	II	Singles	Slovakia	Jozef Kovalík	6–2, 6–7^{(4–7)}, 6–3, 6–4
Victory	32	III	Doubles (with Attila Balázs)	Slovakia	Martin Kližan / Andrej Martin	6–3, 2–6, 6–3, 6–7^{(5–7)}, 6–1
Victory	33	IV	Singles	Slovakia	Martin Kližan	3–6, 6–3, 6–3, 7–5
▲3–1; 15–17 September 2017; Kopaszi gát, Budapest, Hungary; World Group play-off; clay surface
Victory	34	I	Singles	Russia	Andrey Rublev	6–2, 6–4, 5–7, 2–6, 6–3
Victory	35	III	Doubles (with Attila Balázs)	Russia	Konstantin Kravchuk / Daniil Medvedev	7–6^{(7–4)}, 6–4, 7–6^{(7–4)}
Victory	36	IV	Singles	Russia	Karen Khachanov	7–5, 6–4, 6–4
▼2–3; 2–4 February 2018; Country Hall Liège, Liège, Belgium; World Group first round; hard (i) surface
Defeat	37	I	Singles	Belgium	Ruben Bemelmans	4–6, 6–4, 6–7^{(5–7)}, 3–6
Victory	38	III	Doubles (with Attila Balázs)	Belgium	Ruben Bemelmans / Joris De Loore	6–3, 6–4, 6–7^{(2–7)}, 4–6, 7–5
Defeat	39	IV	Singles	Belgium	David Goffin	5–7, 4–6, 6–3, 2–6
▲3–2; 14–16 September 2019; Sport11 Sports, Leisure and Event Center, Budapest, Hungary; Europe/Africa Zone Group I first round; clay surface
Victory	40	II	Singles	Ukraine	Illya Marchenko	6–3, 6–2
Victory	41	III	Doubles (with Attila Balázs)	Ukraine	Denys Molchanov / Sergiy Stakhovsky	7–6^{(7–1)}, 3–6, 6–3
Defeat	42	IV	Singles	Ukraine	Sergiy Stakhovsky	7–5, 3–6, 6–7^{(3–7)}
▲3–2; 6–7 March 2020; Főnix Hall, Debrecen, Hungary; Davis Cup qualifying round; clay (i) surface
Victory	43	II	Singles	Belgium	Kimmer Coppejans	6–2, 5–7, 6–4
Defeat	44	III	Doubles (with Attila Balázs)	Belgium	Sander Gillé / Joran Vliegen	6–3, 1–6, 4–6
Victory	45	V	Singles	Belgium	Ruben Bemelmans	6–7^{(7–9)}, 6–4, 6–2
▼1–2; 27 November 2021; Pala Alpitour, Turin, Italy; Davis Cup Final group stage; hard (indoor) surface
Defeat	46	II	Singles	Australia	Alex de Minaur	5–7, 6–2, 6–7^{(2–7)}
▼2–3; 4–5 March 2022; Ken Rosewall Arena, Sydney, Australia; Davis Cup qualifying round; hard surface
Victory	47	II	Singles	Australia	Thanasi Kokkinakis	7–6^{(7–4)}, 1–6, 6–3
Defeat	48	IV	Singles	Australia	Alex de Minaur	6–7^{(4–7)}, 4–6
▲3–1; 15–16 September 2022; SEB Arena, Vilnius, Lithuania; World Group I first round; hard (indoor) surface
Victory	49	I	Singles	Ukraine	Viacheslav Bielinskyi	6–3, 6–2
Victory	50	IV	Singles	Ukraine	Illya Beloborodko	6–2, 7–5
▼2–3; 3–4 February 2023; Multifunctional Arena, Tatabánya, Hungary; Davis Cup qualifying round; hard (indoor) surface
Defeat	51	II	Singles	France	Ugo Humbert	3–6, 2–6
Defeat	52	IV	Singles	France	Adrian Mannarino	6–7^{(6–8)}, 2–6
