= 2014 ATP Challenger Tour =

Tennis tournament series of the ATP

Details
- Duration: 30 December 2013 – 23 November 2014
- Edition: 37th (6th under this name)
- Tournaments: 150
- Categories: Challenger Tour Finals (1); Challenger 125 (12); Challenger 110 (9); Challenger 100 (16); Challenger 90 (31); Challenger 80 (81)

Achievements (singles)
- Most titles: (Argentina) Diego Sebastián Schwartzman (Luxembourg) Gilles Müller (France) Adrian Mannarino(5)
- Most finals: (Argentina) Diego Sebastián Schwartzman (Luxembourg) Gilles Müller (7)

The ATP Challenger Tour, in 2014 was the secondary professional tennis circuit organized by the ATP. The 2014 ATP Challenger Tour calendar comprised 150 tournaments, with prize money ranging from $40,000 up to $220,000, which represented an increase of the minimum prize money from $35,000. It was the 37th edition of challenger tournaments cycle, and 6th under the name of Challenger Tour.

== Schedule ==
This is the complete schedule of events on the 2014 calendar, with player progression documented from the quarterfinals stage.

=== January ===
Week of	Tournament	Champions	Runners-up	Semifinalists	Quarterfinalists
December 30	Aberto de São Paulo; São Paulo, Brazil; Hard – $125,000+H – 32S/24Q/16D; Singles – Doubles	(Brazil) João Souza; 6–4, 6–4	(Colombia) Alejandro González	(Argentina) Guido Pella (Portugal) Gastão Elias	(Argentina) Agustín Velotti (Argentina) Guido Andreozzi (Argentina) Facundo Argüello (Brazil) Fernando Romboli
December 30	Aberto de São Paulo; São Paulo, Brazil; Hard – $125,000+H – 32S/24Q/16D; Singles – Doubles	(Germany) Gero Kretschmer (Germany) Alexander Satschko; 4–6, 7–5, [10–6]	(Colombia) Nicolás Barrientos (Dominican Republic) Víctor Estrella Burgos	(Argentina) Guido Pella (Portugal) Gastão Elias	(Argentina) Agustín Velotti (Argentina) Guido Andreozzi (Argentina) Facundo Argüello (Brazil) Fernando Romboli
December 30	BNP Paribas de Nouvelle-Calédonie; Nouméa, New Caledonia; Hard – $75,000+H – 32S/23Q/16D; Singles – Doubles	(Colombia) Alejandro Falla; 6–2, 6–2	(Canada) Steven Diez	(Spain) Adrián Menéndez Maceiras (Republic of Ireland) James McGee	(United States) Denis Kudla (France) Lucas Pouille (United States) Austin Krajicek (France) Grégoire Burquier
December 30	BNP Paribas de Nouvelle-Calédonie; Nouméa, New Caledonia; Hard – $75,000+H – 32S/23Q/16D; Singles – Doubles	(United States) Austin Krajicek (United States) Tennys Sandgren; 7–6^{(7–4)}, 6–4	(Croatia) Ante Pavić (Slovenia) Blaž Rola	(Spain) Adrián Menéndez Maceiras (Republic of Ireland) James McGee	(United States) Denis Kudla (France) Lucas Pouille (United States) Austin Krajicek (France) Grégoire Burquier
January 6	No tournaments scheduled.				
January 13	No tournaments scheduled.				
January 20	Intersport Heilbronn Open; Heilbronn, Germany; Hard (i) – €106,500+H – 32S/32Q/16D; Singles – Doubles	(Germany) Peter Gojowczyk; 6–4, 7–5	(Netherlands) Igor Sijsling	(Netherlands) Jesse Huta Galung (Czech Republic) Jiří Veselý	(Italy) Andrea Arnaboldi (Germany) Jan-Lennard Struff (Austria) Andreas Haider-Maurer (Germany) Michael Berrer
January 20	Intersport Heilbronn Open; Heilbronn, Germany; Hard (i) – €106,500+H – 32S/32Q/16D; Singles – Doubles	(Poland) Tomasz Bednarek (Finland) Henri Kontinen; 3–6, 7–6^{(7–3)}, [12–10]	(United Kingdom) Ken Skupski (United Kingdom) Neal Skupski	(Netherlands) Jesse Huta Galung (Czech Republic) Jiří Veselý	(Italy) Andrea Arnaboldi (Germany) Jan-Lennard Struff (Austria) Andreas Haider-Maurer (Germany) Michael Berrer
January 20	Royal Lahaina Challenger; Lahaina, United States; Hard – $50,000 – 32S/22Q/16D; Singles – Doubles	(United States) Bradley Klahn; 6–2, 6–3	(Chinese Taipei) Yang Tsung-hua	(Japan) Tatsuma Ito (United States) Tim Smyczek	(Ukraine) Denys Molchanov (Canada) Peter Polansky (Zimbabwe) Takanyi Garanganga (United States) Austin Krajicek
January 20	Royal Lahaina Challenger; Lahaina, United States; Hard – $50,000 – 32S/22Q/16D; Singles – Doubles	(United States) Denis Kudla (Japan) Yasutaka Uchiyama; 6–3, 6–2	(United States) Daniel Kosakowski (United States) Nicolas Meister	(Japan) Tatsuma Ito (United States) Tim Smyczek	(Ukraine) Denys Molchanov (Canada) Peter Polansky (Zimbabwe) Takanyi Garanganga (United States) Austin Krajicek
January 20	Bucaramanga Open; Bucaramanga, Colombia; Clay – $40,000+H – 32S/32Q/16D; Singles – Doubles	(Colombia) Alejandro Falla; 7–5, 6–1	(Italy) Paolo Lorenzi	(Colombia) Alejandro González (Argentina) Diego Sebastián Schwartzman	(Brazil) André Ghem (Argentina) Facundo Argüello (Argentina) Guido Andreozzi (Spain) Pere Riba
January 20	Bucaramanga Open; Bucaramanga, Colombia; Clay – $40,000+H – 32S/32Q/16D; Singles – Doubles	(Colombia) Juan Sebastián Cabal (Colombia) Robert Farah Maksoud; 7–6^{(7–3)}, 6–3	(United States) Kevin King (Colombia) Juan Carlos Spir	(Colombia) Alejandro González (Argentina) Diego Sebastián Schwartzman	(Brazil) André Ghem (Argentina) Facundo Argüello (Argentina) Guido Andreozzi (Spain) Pere Riba
January 27	McDonald's Burnie International; Burnie, Australia; Hard – $50,000 – 32S/32Q/16D; Singles – Doubles	(Australia) Matt Reid; 6–3 6–2	(Japan) Hiroki Moriya	(United States) Jarmere Jenkins (Japan) Yūichi Ito	(Australia) Matthew Barton (Australia) Alex Bolt (Australia) Benjamin Mitchell (Australia) Christopher O'Connell
January 27	McDonald's Burnie International; Burnie, Australia; Hard – $50,000 – 32S/32Q/16D; Singles – Doubles	(Australia) Matt Reid (Australia) John-Patrick Smith; 6–4, 6–2	(Japan) Toshihide Matsui (Thailand) Danai Udomchoke	(United States) Jarmere Jenkins (Japan) Yūichi Ito	(Australia) Matthew Barton (Australia) Alex Bolt (Australia) Benjamin Mitchell (Australia) Christopher O'Connell
January 27	Visit Panamá Cup de Chitré; Chitré, Panama; Hard – $40,000+H – 32S/25Q/16D; Singles – Doubles	(United States) Wayne Odesnik; 5–7, 6–4, 6–4	(Chinese Taipei) Jimmy Wang	(United States) Daniel Kosakowski (Italy) Paolo Lorenzi	(Colombia) Alejandro Falla (Tunisia) Malek Jaziri (Colombia) Eduardo Struvay (Brazil) André Ghem
January 27	Visit Panamá Cup de Chitré; Chitré, Panama; Hard – $40,000+H – 32S/25Q/16D; Singles – Doubles	(United States) Kevin King (Colombia) Juan Carlos Spir; 7–6^{(7–5)}, 6–4	(Puerto Rico) Alex Llompart (Argentina) Mateo Nicolás Martínez	(United States) Daniel Kosakowski (Italy) Paolo Lorenzi	(Colombia) Alejandro Falla (Tunisia) Malek Jaziri (Colombia) Eduardo Struvay (Brazil) André Ghem

=== February ===
Week of	Tournament	Champions	Runners-up	Semifinalists	Quarterfinalists
February 3	Challenger of Dallas; Dallas, United States; Hard (i) – $100,000 – 32S/32Q/16D; Singles – Doubles	(United States) Steve Johnson; 6–4, 6–4	(Tunisia) Malek Jaziri	(Germany) Tim Pütz (Dominican Republic) Víctor Estrella Burgos	(United States) Rhyne Williams (Australia) Samuel Groth (United States) Evan King (Republic of Ireland) James McGee
February 3	Challenger of Dallas; Dallas, United States; Hard (i) – $100,000 – 32S/32Q/16D; Singles – Doubles	(Australia) Samuel Groth (Australia) Chris Guccione; 6–4, 6–2	(United States) Ryan Harrison (The Bahamas) Mark Knowles	(Germany) Tim Pütz (Dominican Republic) Víctor Estrella Burgos	(United States) Rhyne Williams (Australia) Samuel Groth (United States) Evan King (Republic of Ireland) James McGee
February 3	Shriram Capital P.L. Reddy Memorial Challenger; Chennai, India; Hard – $50,000 – 32S/32Q/16D; Singles – Doubles	(India) Yuki Bhambri; 4–6, 6–3, 7–5	(Russia) Alexander Kudryavtsev	(India) Somdev Devvarman (Russia) Evgeny Donskoy	(Spain) Jordi Samper Montaña (France) Lucas Pouille (India) Saketh Myneni (India) Sanam Singh
February 3	Shriram Capital P.L. Reddy Memorial Challenger; Chennai, India; Hard – $50,000 – 32S/32Q/16D; Singles – Doubles	(India) Yuki Bhambri (New Zealand) Michael Venus; 6–4, 7–6^{(7–3)}	(India) Sriram Balaji (Slovenia) Blaž Rola	(India) Somdev Devvarman (Russia) Evgeny Donskoy	(Spain) Jordi Samper Montaña (France) Lucas Pouille (India) Saketh Myneni (India) Sanam Singh
February 3	Charles Sturt Adelaide International; West Lakes, Australia; Hard – $50,000 – 32S/32Q/16D; Singles – Doubles	(United States) Bradley Klahn; 6–3, 7–6^{(11–9)}	(Japan) Tatsuma Ito	(Japan) Hiroki Moriya (Australia) James Duckworth	(Australia) John-Patrick Smith (Australia) Matthew Barton (Australia) Maverick Banes (United States) Jarmere Jenkins
February 3	Charles Sturt Adelaide International; West Lakes, Australia; Hard – $50,000 – 32S/32Q/16D; Singles – Doubles	(New Zealand) Marcus Daniell (United States) Jarmere Jenkins; 6–4, 6–4	(Australia) Dane Propoggia (New Zealand) Jose Rubin Statham	(Japan) Hiroki Moriya (Australia) James Duckworth	(Australia) John-Patrick Smith (Australia) Matthew Barton (Australia) Maverick Banes (United States) Jarmere Jenkins
February 10	Trofeo Faip–Perrel; Bergamo, Italy; Hard (i) – €42,500+H – 32S/32Q/16D; Singles – Doubles	(Italy) Simone Bolelli; 7–6^{(8–6)}, 6–4	(Germany) Jan-Lennard Struff	(Germany) Dustin Brown (Italy) Andrea Arnaboldi	(Lithuania) Laurynas Grigelis (Italy) Matteo Trevisan (Hungary) Márton Fucsovics (Germany) Andreas Beck
February 10	Trofeo Faip–Perrel; Bergamo, Italy; Hard (i) – €42,500+H – 32S/32Q/16D; Singles – Doubles	(Slovakia) Karol Beck (Slovakia) Michal Mertiňák; 4–6, 7–5, [10–6]	(Russia) Konstantin Kravchuk (Ukraine) Denys Molchanov	(Germany) Dustin Brown (Italy) Andrea Arnaboldi	(Lithuania) Laurynas Grigelis (Italy) Matteo Trevisan (Hungary) Márton Fucsovics (Germany) Andreas Beck
February 10	Open BNP Paribas Banque de Bretagne; Quimper, France; Hard (i) – €42,500+H – 32S/16Q/16D; Singles – Doubles	(France) Pierre-Hugues Herbert; 7–6^{(7–5)}, 6–3	(France) Vincent Millot	(France) Grégoire Burquier (Luxembourg) Gilles Müller	(France) Mathieu Rodrigues (France) Albano Olivetti (Romania) Marius Copil (Czech Republic) Jan Mertl
February 10	Open BNP Paribas Banque de Bretagne; Quimper, France; Hard (i) – €42,500+H – 32S/16Q/16D; Singles – Doubles	(France) Pierre-Hugues Herbert (France) Albano Olivetti; 6–4, 6–3	(Croatia) Toni Androić (Croatia) Nikola Mektić	(France) Grégoire Burquier (Luxembourg) Gilles Müller	(France) Mathieu Rodrigues (France) Albano Olivetti (Romania) Marius Copil (Czech Republic) Jan Mertl
February 10	State Bank of India ATP Challenger Tour; Kolkata, India; Hard – $50,000 – 32S/32Q/16D; Singles – Doubles	(Serbia) Ilija Bozoljac; 6–1, 6–1	(Russia) Evgeny Donskoy	(Kazakhstan) Aleksandr Nedovesov (India) Somdev Devvarman	(France) David Guez (Argentina) Agustín Velotti (Chinese Taipei) Chen Ti (Spain) Adrián Menéndez Maceiras
February 10	State Bank of India ATP Challenger Tour; Kolkata, India; Hard – $50,000 – 32S/32Q/16D; Singles – Doubles	(India) Saketh Myneni (India) Sanam Singh; 6–3, 3–6, [10–4]	(India) Divij Sharan (India) Vishnu Vardhan	(Kazakhstan) Aleksandr Nedovesov (India) Somdev Devvarman	(France) David Guez (Argentina) Agustín Velotti (Chinese Taipei) Chen Ti (Spain) Adrián Menéndez Maceiras
February 17	ONGC–GAIL Delhi Open; New Delhi, India; Hard – $100,000 – 32S/32Q/16D; Singles – Doubles	(India) Somdev Devvarman; 6–3, 6–1	(Kazakhstan) Aleksandr Nedovesov	(Serbia) Ilija Bozoljac (Russia) Evgeny Donskoy	(France) Lucas Pouille (Ukraine) Illya Marchenko (Moldova) Radu Albot (China) Zhang Ze
February 17	ONGC–GAIL Delhi Open; New Delhi, India; Hard – $100,000 – 32S/32Q/16D; Singles – Doubles	(India) Saketh Myneni (India) Sanam Singh; 7–6^{(7–5)}, 6–4	(Thailand) Sanchai Ratiwatana (Thailand) Sonchat Ratiwatana	(Serbia) Ilija Bozoljac (Russia) Evgeny Donskoy	(France) Lucas Pouille (Ukraine) Illya Marchenko (Moldova) Radu Albot (China) Zhang Ze
February 17	Morelos Open; Cuernavaca, Mexico; Hard – $75,000+H – 32S/32Q/16D; Singles – Doubles	(Austria) Gerald Melzer; 6–1, 6–4	(Dominican Republic) Víctor Estrella Burgos	(United States) Rajeev Ram (Tunisia) Malek Jaziri	(Brazil) Henrique Cunha (United States) Nicolas Meister (United States) Daniel Kosakowski (Colombia) Carlos Salamanca
February 17	Morelos Open; Cuernavaca, Mexico; Hard – $75,000+H – 32S/32Q/16D; Singles – Doubles	(Slovakia) Andrej Martin (Austria) Gerald Melzer; 6–2, 6–4	(Mexico) Alejandro Moreno Figueroa (Mexico) Miguel Ángel Reyes-Varela	(United States) Rajeev Ram (Tunisia) Malek Jaziri	(Brazil) Henrique Cunha (United States) Nicolas Meister (United States) Daniel Kosakowski (Colombia) Carlos Salamanca
February 17	Astana Challenger; Astana, Kazakhstan; Hard (i) – $75,000 – 32S/27Q/16D; Singles – Doubles	(Kazakhstan) Andrey Golubev; 6–4, 6–4	(Luxembourg) Gilles Müller	(Georgia (country)) Nikoloz Basilashvili (Uzbekistan) Farrukh Dustov	(Russia) Alexander Kudryavtsev (Serbia) Filip Krajinović (Turkey) Marsel İlhan (Italy) Matteo Viola
February 17	Astana Challenger; Astana, Kazakhstan; Hard (i) – $75,000 – 32S/27Q/16D; Singles – Doubles	(Belarus) Sergey Betov (Belarus) Aliaksandr Bury; 6–1, 6–4	(Kazakhstan) Andrey Golubev (Kazakhstan) Evgeny Korolev	(Georgia (country)) Nikoloz Basilashvili (Uzbekistan) Farrukh Dustov	(Russia) Alexander Kudryavtsev (Serbia) Filip Krajinović (Turkey) Marsel İlhan (Italy) Matteo Viola
February 24	Challenger La Manche; Cherbourg, France; Hard (i) – €64,000+H – 32S/21Q/16D; Singles – Doubles	(France) Kenny de Schepper; 3–6, 6–2, 6–3	(Slovakia) Norbert Gomboš	(Uzbekistan) Farrukh Dustov (Lithuania) Ričardas Berankis	(France) Albano Olivetti (Czech Republic) Jaroslav Pospíšil (France) Lucas Pouille (Germany) Dustin Brown
February 24	Challenger La Manche; Cherbourg, France; Hard (i) – €64,000+H – 32S/21Q/16D; Singles – Doubles	(Finland) Henri Kontinen (Russia) Konstantin Kravchuk; 6–4, 6–7^{(3–7)}, [10–7]	(France) Pierre-Hugues Herbert (France) Albano Olivetti	(Uzbekistan) Farrukh Dustov (Lithuania) Ričardas Berankis	(France) Albano Olivetti (Czech Republic) Jaroslav Pospíšil (France) Lucas Pouille (Germany) Dustin Brown
February 24	ATP Challenger Guangzhou; Guangzhou, China; Hard – $50,000+H – 32S/28Q/16D; Singles – Doubles	(Slovenia) Blaž Rola; 6–7^{(4–7)}, 6–4, 6–3	(Japan) Yūichi Sugita	(Japan) Go Soeda (New Zealand) Michael Venus	(Austria) Martin Fischer (Germany) Matthias Bachinger (Portugal) Rui Machado (Israel) Amir Weintraub
February 24	ATP Challenger Guangzhou; Guangzhou, China; Hard – $50,000+H – 32S/28Q/16D; Singles – Doubles	(Thailand) Sanchai Ratiwatana (Thailand) Sonchat Ratiwatana; 6–2, 6–4	(Chinese Taipei) Lee Hsin-han (Israel) Amir Weintraub	(Japan) Go Soeda (New Zealand) Michael Venus	(Austria) Martin Fischer (Germany) Matthias Bachinger (Portugal) Rui Machado (Israel) Amir Weintraub
February 24	Challenger ATP de Salinas Diario Expreso; Salinas, Ecuador; Clay – $40,000+H – 32S/32Q/16D; Singles – Doubles	(Dominican Republic) Víctor Estrella Burgos; 6–3, 6–4	(Argentina) Andrea Collarini	(Argentina) Renzo Olivo (Ecuador) Emilio Gómez	(Colombia) Carlos Salamanca (Brazil) José Pereira (Argentina) Juan Ignacio Londero (Argentina) Marco Trungelliti
February 24	Challenger ATP de Salinas Diario Expreso; Salinas, Ecuador; Clay – $40,000+H – 32S/32Q/16D; Singles – Doubles	(Venezuela) Roberto Maytín (Brazil) Fernando Romboli; 6–3, 6–4	(Bolivia) Hugo Dellien (Argentina) Eduardo Schwank	(Argentina) Renzo Olivo (Ecuador) Emilio Gómez	(Colombia) Carlos Salamanca (Brazil) José Pereira (Argentina) Juan Ignacio Londero (Argentina) Marco Trungelliti

=== March ===
Week of	Tournament	Champions	Runners-up	Semifinalists	Quarterfinalists
March 3	All Japan Indoor Tennis Championships; Kyoto, Japan; Hard (i) – $40,000+H – 32S/25Q/16D; Singles – Doubles	(Austria) Martin Fischer; 3–6, 7–5, 6–4	(Japan) Tatsuma Ito	(Japan) Go Soeda (Switzerland) Marco Chiudinelli	(Japan) Hiroki Moriya (Germany) Andreas Beck (Japan) Yuuya Kibi (Lithuania) Ričardas Berankis
March 3	All Japan Indoor Tennis Championships; Kyoto, Japan; Hard (i) – $40,000+H – 32S/25Q/16D; Singles – Doubles	(India) Purav Raja (India) Divij Sharan; 5–7, 7–6^{(7–3)}, [10–4]	(Thailand) Sanchai Ratiwatana (New Zealand) Michael Venus	(Japan) Go Soeda (Switzerland) Marco Chiudinelli	(Japan) Hiroki Moriya (Germany) Andreas Beck (Japan) Yuuya Kibi (Lithuania) Ričardas Berankis
March 10	Irving Tennis Classic; Irving, United States; Hard – $125,000+H – 32S/32Q/16D; Singles – Doubles	(Czech Republic) Lukáš Rosol; 6–0, 6–3	(United States) Steve Johnson	(Germany) Tobias Kamke (Ukraine) Sergiy Stakhovsky	(Germany) Benjamin Becker (Ukraine) Illya Marchenko (United States) Ryan Harrison (United States) Tim Smyczek
March 10	Irving Tennis Classic; Irving, United States; Hard – $125,000+H – 32S/32Q/16D; Singles – Doubles	(Mexico) Santiago González (United States) Scott Lipsky; 4–6, 7–6^{(9–7)}, [10–7]	(Australia) John-Patrick Smith (New Zealand) Michael Venus	(Germany) Tobias Kamke (Ukraine) Sergiy Stakhovsky	(Germany) Benjamin Becker (Ukraine) Illya Marchenko (United States) Ryan Harrison (United States) Tim Smyczek
March 10	Kazan Kremlin Cup; Kazan, Russia; Hard (i) – $75,000+H – 32S/32Q/16D; Singles – Doubles	(Turkey) Marsel İlhan; 7–6^{(8–6)}, 6–3	(Germany) Michael Berrer	(Uzbekistan) Farrukh Dustov (Russia) Andrey Kuznetsov	(France) Albano Olivetti (Lithuania) Ričardas Berankis (Slovakia) Norbert Gomboš (Luxembourg) Gilles Müller
March 10	Kazan Kremlin Cup; Kazan, Russia; Hard (i) – $75,000+H – 32S/32Q/16D; Singles – Doubles	(Italy) Flavio Cipolla (Serbia) Goran Tošić; 3–6, 7–5, [12–10]	(Russia) Victor Baluda (Russia) Konstantin Kravchuk	(Uzbekistan) Farrukh Dustov (Russia) Andrey Kuznetsov	(France) Albano Olivetti (Lithuania) Ričardas Berankis (Slovakia) Norbert Gomboš (Luxembourg) Gilles Müller
March 17	Challenger Banque Nationale; Rimouski, Canada; Hard (i) – $40,000+H – 32S/14Q/16D; Singles – Doubles	(Australia) Samuel Groth; 7–6^{(7–3)}, 6–2	(Croatia) Ante Pavić	(United States) Austin Krajicek (Japan) Yūichi Sugita	(United States) Rajeev Ram (Germany) Andreas Beck (Japan) Yoshihito Nishioka (United Kingdom) Daniel Cox
March 17	Challenger Banque Nationale; Rimouski, Canada; Hard (i) – $40,000+H – 32S/14Q/16D; Singles – Doubles	(United Kingdom) Edward Corrie (United Kingdom) Daniel Smethurst; 6–2, 6–1	(Belgium) Germain Gigounon (Belgium) Olivier Rochus	(United States) Austin Krajicek (Japan) Yūichi Sugita	(United States) Rajeev Ram (Germany) Andreas Beck (Japan) Yoshihito Nishioka (United Kingdom) Daniel Cox
March 17	Visit Panamá Cup; Panama City, Panama; Clay – $40,000+H – 32S/32Q/16D; Singles – Doubles	(Spain) Pere Riba; 7–5, 5–7, 6–2	(Slovenia) Blaž Rola	(Spain) Albert Ramos (Austria) Gerald Melzer	(Romania) Adrian Ungur (Austria) Andreas Haider-Maurer (Uruguay) Pablo Cuevas (Argentina) Guido Andreozzi
March 17	Visit Panamá Cup; Panama City, Panama; Clay – $40,000+H – 32S/32Q/16D; Singles – Doubles	(Czech Republic) František Čermák (Russia) Mikhail Elgin; 4–6, 6–3, [10–8]	(Argentina) Martín Alund (Argentina) Guillermo Durán	(Spain) Albert Ramos (Austria) Gerald Melzer	(Romania) Adrian Ungur (Austria) Andreas Haider-Maurer (Uruguay) Pablo Cuevas (Argentina) Guido Andreozzi
March 24	Jalisco Open; Guadalajara, Mexico; Hard – $100,000+H – 32S/32Q/16D; Singles – Doubles	(Luxembourg) Gilles Müller; 6–2, 6–2	(United States) Denis Kudla	(United States) Rajeev Ram (Germany) Jan-Lennard Struff	(Germany) Dustin Brown (Zimbabwe) Takanyi Garanganga (Croatia) Ante Pavić (El Salvador) Marcelo Arévalo
March 24	Jalisco Open; Guadalajara, Mexico; Hard – $100,000+H – 32S/32Q/16D; Singles – Doubles	(Mexico) César Ramírez (Mexico) Miguel Ángel Reyes-Varela; 6–4, 6–2	(Germany) Andre Begemann (Australia) Matthew Ebden	(United States) Rajeev Ram (Germany) Jan-Lennard Struff	(Germany) Dustin Brown (Zimbabwe) Takanyi Garanganga (Croatia) Ante Pavić (El Salvador) Marcelo Arévalo
March 24	Seguros Bolívar Open Barranquilla; Barranquilla, Colombia; Clay – $40,000+H – 32S/30Q/16D; Singles – Doubles	(Uruguay) Pablo Cuevas; 6–3, 6–1	(Slovakia) Martin Kližan	(Romania) Adrian Ungur (Spain) Albert Ramos	(Colombia) Alejandro Falla (Austria) Andreas Haider-Maurer (Slovenia) Blaž Rola (Spain) Pere Riba
March 24	Seguros Bolívar Open Barranquilla; Barranquilla, Colombia; Clay – $40,000+H – 32S/30Q/16D; Singles – Doubles	(Uruguay) Pablo Cuevas (Spain) Pere Riba; 6–4, 6–3	(Czech Republic) František Čermák (Russia) Mikhail Elgin	(Romania) Adrian Ungur (Spain) Albert Ramos	(Colombia) Alejandro Falla (Austria) Andreas Haider-Maurer (Slovenia) Blaž Rola (Spain) Pere Riba
March 31	Open Guadeloupe; Le Gosier, Guadeloupe; Hard – $100,000+H – 32S/32Q/16D; Singles – Doubles	(United States) Steve Johnson; 6–1, 6–7^{(5–7)}, 7–6^{(7–2)}	(France) Kenny de Schepper	(United States) Michael Russell (Italy) Thomas Fabbiano	(Spain) Daniel Muñoz de la Nava (France) Fabrice Martin (United States) Denis Kudla (Belgium) Olivier Rochus
March 31	Open Guadeloupe; Le Gosier, Guadeloupe; Hard – $100,000+H – 32S/32Q/16D; Singles – Doubles	(Poland) Tomasz Bednarek (Canada) Adil Shamasdin; 7–5, 6–7^{(5–7)}, [10–8]	(Germany) Gero Kretschmer (New Zealand) Michael Venus	(United States) Michael Russell (Italy) Thomas Fabbiano	(Spain) Daniel Muñoz de la Nava (France) Fabrice Martin (United States) Denis Kudla (Belgium) Olivier Rochus
March 31	Open Harmonie mutuelle Saint-Brieuc, France; Hard (i) – €42,500+H – 32S/22Q/16D; Singles – Doubles	(Germany) Andreas Beck; 7–5, 6–3	(France) Grégoire Burquier	(France) David Guez (Russia) Evgeny Donskoy	(Czech Republic) Jan Hernych (Germany) Michael Berrer (France) Jules Marie (France) Enzo Couacaud
March 31	Open Harmonie mutuelle Saint-Brieuc, France; Hard (i) – €42,500+H – 32S/22Q/16D; Singles – Doubles	(Germany) Dominik Meffert (Germany) Tim Pütz; 6–4, 6–3	(Russia) Victor Baluda (Germany) Philipp Marx	(France) David Guez (Russia) Evgeny Donskoy	(Czech Republic) Jan Hernych (Germany) Michael Berrer (France) Jules Marie (France) Enzo Couacaud
March 31	Challenger Ficrea, presentado por ultra León, Mexico; Hard – $40,000+H – 32S/27Q/16D; Singles – Doubles	(United States) Rajeev Ram; 6–2, 6–2	(Australia) Samuel Groth	(Spain) Adrián Menéndez Maceiras (Argentina) Agustín Velotti	(Japan) Yūichi Sugita (France) Pierre-Hugues Herbert (United States) Austin Krajicek (New Zealand) Marcus Daniell
March 31	Challenger Ficrea, presentado por ultra León, Mexico; Hard – $40,000+H – 32S/27Q/16D; Singles – Doubles	(Australia) Samuel Groth (Australia) Chris Guccione; 6–3, 6–4	(New Zealand) Marcus Daniell (New Zealand) Artem Sitak	(Spain) Adrián Menéndez Maceiras (Argentina) Agustín Velotti	(Japan) Yūichi Sugita (France) Pierre-Hugues Herbert (United States) Austin Krajicek (New Zealand) Marcus Daniell

=== April ===
Week of	Tournament	Champions	Runners-up	Semifinalists	Quarterfinalists
April 7	Mersin Cup; Mersin, Turkey; Clay – €64,000 – 32S/18Q/16D; Singles – Doubles	(Bosnia and Herzegovina) Damir Džumhur; 7–6^{(7–4)}, 6–3	(Spain) Pere Riba	(Slovenia) Aljaž Bedene (Italy) Matteo Viola	(Slovakia) Norbert Gomboš (Italy) Simone Bolelli (Germany) Julian Reister (Italy) Thomas Fabbiano
April 7	Mersin Cup; Mersin, Turkey; Clay – €64,000 – 32S/18Q/16D; Singles – Doubles	(Moldova) Radu Albot (Czech Republic) Jaroslav Pospíšil; 7–6^{(9–7)}, 6–1	(Italy) Thomas Fabbiano (Italy) Matteo Viola	(Slovenia) Aljaž Bedene (Italy) Matteo Viola	(Slovakia) Norbert Gomboš (Italy) Simone Bolelli (Germany) Julian Reister (Italy) Thomas Fabbiano
April 7	Taroii Open de Tênis; Itajaí, Brazil; Clay – $40,000+H – 32S/32Q/16D; Singles – Doubles	(Argentina) Facundo Argüello; 4–6, 6–0, 6–4	(Argentina) Diego Sebastián Schwartzman	(Argentina) Andrés Molteni (Brazil) João Souza	(Brazil) André Ghem (Belgium) Kimmer Coppejans (France) Axel Michon (Argentina) Guido Andreozzi
April 7	Taroii Open de Tênis; Itajaí, Brazil; Clay – $40,000+H – 32S/32Q/16D; Singles – Doubles	(Argentina) Máximo González (Argentina) Eduardo Schwank; 6–2, 6–3	(Brazil) André Sá (Brazil) João Souza	(Argentina) Andrés Molteni (Brazil) João Souza	(Brazil) André Ghem (Belgium) Kimmer Coppejans (France) Axel Michon (Argentina) Guido Andreozzi
April 14	Sarasota Open; Sarasota, United States; Clay – $100,000 (green) – 32S/32Q/16D; Singles – Doubles	(Australia) Nick Kyrgios; 7–6^{(12–10)}, 6–4	(Serbia) Filip Krajinović	(Austria) Gerald Melzer (United States) Daniel Kosakowski	(Uzbekistan) Farrukh Dustov (Japan) Taro Daniel (United Kingdom) James Ward (United States) Donald Young
April 14	Sarasota Open; Sarasota, United States; Clay – $100,000 (green) – 32S/32Q/16D; Singles – Doubles	(Croatia) Marin Draganja (Finland) Henri Kontinen; 7–5, 5–7, [10–6]	(Spain) Rubén Ramírez Hidalgo (Croatia) Franko Škugor	(Austria) Gerald Melzer (United States) Daniel Kosakowski	(Uzbekistan) Farrukh Dustov (Japan) Taro Daniel (United Kingdom) James Ward (United States) Donald Young
April 14	San Luis Potosí Challenger; San Luis Potosí, Mexico; Clay – $40,000+H – 32S/24Q/16D; Singles – Doubles	(Italy) Paolo Lorenzi; 6–1, 6–3	(Spain) Adrián Menéndez Maceiras	(El Salvador) Marcelo Arévalo (Dominican Republic) Víctor Estrella Burgos	(Germany) Nils Langer (Colombia) Nicolás Barrientos (Italy) Alessio di Mauro (Argentina) Agustín Velotti
April 14	San Luis Potosí Challenger; San Luis Potosí, Mexico; Clay – $40,000+H – 32S/24Q/16D; Singles – Doubles	(United States) Kevin King (Colombia) Juan Carlos Spir; 6–3, 6–4	(Spain) Adrián Menéndez Maceiras (Argentina) Agustín Velotti	(El Salvador) Marcelo Arévalo (Dominican Republic) Víctor Estrella Burgos	(Germany) Nils Langer (Colombia) Nicolás Barrientos (Italy) Alessio di Mauro (Argentina) Agustín Velotti
April 14	Challenger ATP Cachantún Cup; Santiago, Chile; Clay – $40,000+H – 32S/23Q/16D; Singles – Doubles	(Netherlands) Thiemo de Bakker; 4–6, 7–6^{(12–10)}, 6–1	(Australia) James Duckworth	(Chile) Hans Podlipnik (Republic of Ireland) Louk Sorensen	(Argentina) Eduardo Schwank (Argentina) Federico Coria (United States) Wayne Odesnik (Argentina) Facundo Argüello
April 14	Challenger ATP Cachantún Cup; Santiago, Chile; Clay – $40,000+H – 32S/23Q/16D; Singles – Doubles	(Chile) Cristian Garín (Chile) Nicolás Jarry; Walkover	(Chile) Jorge Aguilar (Chile) Hans Podlipnik	(Chile) Hans Podlipnik (Republic of Ireland) Louk Sorensen	(Argentina) Eduardo Schwank (Argentina) Federico Coria (United States) Wayne Odesnik (Argentina) Facundo Argüello
April 14	São Paulo Challenger de Tênis; São Paulo, Brazil; Clay – $40,000+H – 32S/32Q/16D; Singles – Doubles	(Brazil) Rogério Dutra da Silva; 6–4, 6–2	(Slovenia) Blaž Rola	(France) Axel Michon (Portugal) Gastão Elias	(Argentina) Máximo González (Brazil) João Souza (Argentina) Horacio Zeballos (Argentina) Guido Pella
April 14	São Paulo Challenger de Tênis; São Paulo, Brazil; Clay – $40,000+H – 32S/32Q/16D; Singles – Doubles	(Argentina) Guido Pella (Argentina) Diego Sebastián Schwartzman; 1–6, 6–3, [10–4]	(Argentina) Máximo González (Argentina) Andrés Molteni	(France) Axel Michon (Portugal) Gastão Elias	(Argentina) Máximo González (Brazil) João Souza (Argentina) Horacio Zeballos (Argentina) Guido Pella
April 21	Savannah Challenger; Savannah, United States; Clay – $50,000 (green) – 32S/32Q/16D; Singles – Doubles	(Australia) Nick Kyrgios; 2–6, 7–6^{(7–4)}, 6–4	(United States) Jack Sock	(Argentina) Facundo Bagnis (Serbia) Filip Krajinović	(United States) Alex Kuznetsov (Canada) Frank Dancevic (Russia) Alex Bogomolov Jr. (Ukraine) Illya Marchenko
April 21	Savannah Challenger; Savannah, United States; Clay – $50,000 (green) – 32S/32Q/16D; Singles – Doubles	(Serbia) Ilija Bozoljac (New Zealand) Michael Venus; 7–5, 6–2	(Argentina) Facundo Bagnis (Russia) Alex Bogomolov Jr.	(Argentina) Facundo Bagnis (Serbia) Filip Krajinović	(United States) Alex Kuznetsov (Canada) Frank Dancevic (Russia) Alex Bogomolov Jr. (Ukraine) Illya Marchenko
April 21	Gemdale ATP Challenger; Shenzhen, China; Hard – $50,000+H – 32S/32Q/16D; Singles – Doubles	(Luxembourg) Gilles Müller; 7–6^{(7–4)}, 6–3	(Slovakia) Lukáš Lacko	(Chinese Taipei) Lu Yen-hsun (Japan) Hiroki Moriya	(Japan) Tatsuma Ito (China) Zhang Ze (Switzerland) Marco Chiudinelli (Australia) Matt Reid
April 21	Gemdale ATP Challenger; Shenzhen, China; Hard – $50,000+H – 32S/32Q/16D; Singles – Doubles	(Australia) Samuel Groth (Australia) Chris Guccione; 6–3, 7–6^{(7–5)}	(Germany) Dominik Meffert (Germany) Tim Pütz	(Chinese Taipei) Lu Yen-hsun (Japan) Hiroki Moriya	(Japan) Tatsuma Ito (China) Zhang Ze (Switzerland) Marco Chiudinelli (Australia) Matt Reid
April 21	Campeonato Internacional de Tenis de Santos; Santos, Brazil; Clay – $40,000+H – 32S/32Q/16D; Singles – Doubles	(Argentina) Máximo González; 7–5, 6–3	(Portugal) Gastão Elias	(France) Axel Michon (Argentina) Diego Sebastián Schwartzman	(United States) Denis Kudla (Argentina) Guido Pella (Netherlands) Thiemo de Bakker (United States) Wayne Odesnik
April 21	Campeonato Internacional de Tenis de Santos; Santos, Brazil; Clay – $40,000+H – 32S/32Q/16D; Singles – Doubles	(Argentina) Máximo González (Argentina) Andrés Molteni; 7–5, 6–4	(Argentina) Guillermo Durán (Argentina) Renzo Olivo	(France) Axel Michon (Argentina) Diego Sebastián Schwartzman	(United States) Denis Kudla (Argentina) Guido Pella (Netherlands) Thiemo de Bakker (United States) Wayne Odesnik
April 21	Città di Vercelli – Trofeo Multimed; Vercelli, Italy; Clay – €42,500 – 32S/32Q/16D; Singles – Doubles	(Italy) Simone Bolelli; 6–2, 6–2	(Croatia) Mate Delić	(Italy) Marco Cecchinato (Italy) Andrea Arnaboldi	(Italy) Potito Starace (Italy) Stefano Travaglia (United Kingdom) Kyle Edmund (France) Jonathan Eysseric
April 21	Città di Vercelli – Trofeo Multimed; Vercelli, Italy; Clay – €42,500 – 32S/32Q/16D; Singles – Doubles	(Italy) Matteo Donati (Italy) Stefano Napolitano; 7–6^{(7–2)}, 6–3	(France) Pierre-Hugues Herbert (France) Albano Olivetti	(Italy) Marco Cecchinato (Italy) Andrea Arnaboldi	(Italy) Potito Starace (Italy) Stefano Travaglia (United Kingdom) Kyle Edmund (France) Jonathan Eysseric
April 28	Tunis Open; Tunis, Tunisia; Clay – $125,000+H – 32S/18Q/16D; Singles – Doubles	(Italy) Simone Bolelli; 6–4, 6–2	(Germany) Julian Reister	(Croatia) Mate Delić (Turkey) Marsel İlhan	(Italy) Andrea Arnaboldi (Romania) Adrian Ungur (Russia) Evgeny Donskoy (Croatia) Ante Pavić
April 28	Tunis Open; Tunis, Tunisia; Clay – $125,000+H – 32S/18Q/16D; Singles – Doubles	(France) Pierre-Hugues Herbert (Canada) Adil Shamasdin; 6–3, 7–6^{(7–5)}	(Netherlands) Stephan Fransen (Netherlands) Jesse Huta Galung	(Croatia) Mate Delić (Turkey) Marsel İlhan	(Italy) Andrea Arnaboldi (Romania) Adrian Ungur (Russia) Evgeny Donskoy (Croatia) Ante Pavić
April 28	Prosperita Open; Ostrava, Czech Republic; Clay – €85,000+H – 32S/32Q/16D; Singles – Doubles	(Russia) Andrey Kuznetsov; 2–6, 6–3, 6–0	(Slovakia) Miloslav Mečíř Jr.	(Slovenia) Blaž Rola (Austria) Andreas Haider-Maurer	(Czech Republic) Radek Štěpánek (Italy) Lorenzo Giustino (Spain) Adrián Menéndez Maceiras (France) Stéphane Robert
April 28	Prosperita Open; Ostrava, Czech Republic; Clay – €85,000+H – 32S/32Q/16D; Singles – Doubles	(Russia) Andrey Kuznetsov (Spain) Adrián Menéndez Maceiras; 4–6, 6–3, [10–8]	(Italy) Alessandro Motti (Italy) Matteo Viola	(Slovenia) Blaž Rola (Austria) Andreas Haider-Maurer	(Czech Republic) Radek Štěpánek (Italy) Lorenzo Giustino (Spain) Adrián Menéndez Maceiras (France) Stéphane Robert
April 28	Santaizi ATP Challenger; Taipei City, Taiwan; Carpet (i) – $75,000 – 32S/25Q/16D; Singles – Doubles	(Luxembourg) Gilles Müller; 6–3, 6–3	(Australia) John-Patrick Smith	(Japan) Tatsuma Ito (Japan) Go Soeda	(Israel) Amir Weintraub (Japan) Hiroki Moriya (Chinese Taipei) Jimmy Wang (Slovakia) Lukáš Lacko
April 28	Santaizi ATP Challenger; Taipei City, Taiwan; Carpet (i) – $75,000 – 32S/25Q/16D; Singles – Doubles	(Australia) Samuel Groth (Australia) Chris Guccione; 6–4, 5–7, [10–8]	(United States) Austin Krajicek (Australia) John-Patrick Smith	(Japan) Tatsuma Ito (Japan) Go Soeda	(Israel) Amir Weintraub (Japan) Hiroki Moriya (Chinese Taipei) Jimmy Wang (Slovakia) Lukáš Lacko
April 28	Anning Open; Anning, China; Clay – $50,000+H – 32S/26Q/16D; Singles – Doubles	(Australia) Alex Bolt; 6–2, 7–5	(Croatia) Nikola Mektić	(Croatia) Borna Ćorić (Australia) Jordan Thompson	(United States) Chase Buchanan (Australia) Matt Reid (Australia) Andrew Whittington (Slovenia) Grega Žemlja
April 28	Anning Open; Anning, China; Clay – $50,000+H – 32S/26Q/16D; Singles – Doubles	(Australia) Alex Bolt (Australia) Andrew Whittington; 6–4, 6–3	(United Kingdom) Daniel Cox (China) Gong Maoxin	(Croatia) Borna Ćorić (Australia) Jordan Thompson	(United States) Chase Buchanan (Australia) Matt Reid (Australia) Andrew Whittington (Slovenia) Grega Žemlja
April 28	Tallahassee Tennis Challenger; Tallahassee, United States; Clay – $50,000 (green) – 32S/24Q/16D; Singles – Doubles	(United States) Robby Ginepri; 6–3, 6–4	(Canada) Frank Dancevic	(United States) Donald Young (Republic of Ireland) James McGee	(United States) Alex Kuznetsov (Austria) Gerald Melzer (United Kingdom) James Ward (Japan) Yoshihito Nishioka
April 28	Tallahassee Tennis Challenger; Tallahassee, United States; Clay – $50,000 (green) – 32S/24Q/16D; Singles – Doubles	(Australia) Ryan Agar (Austria) Sebastian Bader; 6–4, 7–6^{(7–3)}	(United States) Bjorn Fratangelo (United States) Mitchell Krueger	(United States) Donald Young (Republic of Ireland) James McGee	(United States) Alex Kuznetsov (Austria) Gerald Melzer (United Kingdom) James Ward (Japan) Yoshihito Nishioka
April 28	Seguros Bolívar Open Cali; Cali, Colombia; Clay – $40,000+H – 32S/30Q/16D; Singles – Doubles	(Chile) Gonzalo Lama; 6–3, 4–6, 6–3	(Argentina) Marco Trungelliti	(Argentina) Facundo Bagnis (Belgium) Arthur De Greef	(Italy) Paolo Lorenzi (Venezuela) David Souto (Australia) James Duckworth (Egypt) Sherif Sabry
April 28	Seguros Bolívar Open Cali; Cali, Colombia; Clay – $40,000+H – 32S/30Q/16D; Singles – Doubles	(Argentina) Facundo Bagnis (Argentina) Eduardo Schwank; 6–3, 6–3	(Colombia) Nicolás Barrientos (Colombia) Eduardo Struvay	(Argentina) Facundo Bagnis (Belgium) Arthur De Greef	(Italy) Paolo Lorenzi (Venezuela) David Souto (Australia) James Duckworth (Egypt) Sherif Sabry

=== May ===
Week of	Tournament	Champions	Runners-up	Semifinalists	Quarterfinalists
May 5	Open du Pays d'Aix; Aix-en-Provence, France; Clay – €64,000 – 32S/22Q/16D; Singles – Doubles	(Argentina) Diego Sebastián Schwartzman; 6–7^{(4–7)}, 6–3, 6–2	(Germany) Andreas Beck	(Spain) Rubén Ramírez Hidalgo (Switzerland) Yann Marti	(Spain) Jordi Samper Montaña (France) Jonathan Eysseric (Czech Republic) Jan Hernych (France) Albano Olivetti
May 5	Open du Pays d'Aix; Aix-en-Provence, France; Clay – €64,000 – 32S/22Q/16D; Singles – Doubles	(Argentina) Diego Sebastián Schwartzman (Argentina) Horacio Zeballos; 6–4, 3–6, [10–5]	(Germany) Andreas Beck (Austria) Martin Fischer	(Spain) Rubén Ramírez Hidalgo (Switzerland) Yann Marti	(Spain) Jordi Samper Montaña (France) Jonathan Eysseric (Czech Republic) Jan Hernych (France) Albano Olivetti
May 5	Adidas International Gimcheon; Gimcheon, South Korea; Hard – $50,000 – 32S/32Q/16D; Singles – Doubles	(Luxembourg) Gilles Müller; 7–6^{(7–5)}, 5–7, 6–4	(Japan) Tatsuma Ito	(Slovakia) Lukáš Lacko (Japan) Yūichi Sugita	(Israel) Amir Weintraub (Australia) Samuel Groth (Australia) Luke Saville (United States) Rajeev Ram
May 5	Adidas International Gimcheon; Gimcheon, South Korea; Hard – $50,000 – 32S/32Q/16D; Singles – Doubles	(Australia) Samuel Groth (Australia) Chris Guccione; 6–7^{(5–7)}, 7–5, [10–4]	(United States) Austin Krajicek (Australia) John-Patrick Smith	(Slovakia) Lukáš Lacko (Japan) Yūichi Sugita	(Israel) Amir Weintraub (Australia) Samuel Groth (Australia) Luke Saville (United States) Rajeev Ram
May 5	Rome Open; Rome, Italy; Clay – €42,500+H – 32S/32Q/16D; Singles – Doubles	(Germany) Julian Reister; 6–3, 6–2	(Uruguay) Pablo Cuevas	(Italy) Marco Cecchinato (Italy) Filippo Volandri	(Argentina) Máximo González (Italy) Lorenzo Giustino (Japan) Taro Daniel (Slovakia) Miloslav Mečíř Jr.
May 5	Rome Open; Rome, Italy; Clay – €42,500+H – 32S/32Q/16D; Singles – Doubles	(Moldova) Radu Albot (New Zealand) Artem Sitak; 4–6, 6–2, [11–9]	(Italy) Andrea Arnaboldi (Italy) Flavio Cipolla	(Italy) Marco Cecchinato (Italy) Filippo Volandri	(Argentina) Máximo González (Italy) Lorenzo Giustino (Japan) Taro Daniel (Slovakia) Miloslav Mečíř Jr.
May 12	BNP Paribas Primrose Bordeaux; Bordeaux, France; Clay – €85,000+H – 32S/26Q/16D; Singles – Doubles	(France) Julien Benneteau; 6–3, 6–2	(United States) Steve Johnson	(France) Kenny de Schepper (Argentina) Juan Ignacio Londero	(Czech Republic) Jiří Veselý (Tunisia) Malek Jaziri (France) David Guez (Belgium) David Goffin
May 12	BNP Paribas Primrose Bordeaux; Bordeaux, France; Clay – €85,000+H – 32S/26Q/16D; Singles – Doubles	(France) Marc Gicquel (Ukraine) Sergiy Stakhovsky; Walkover	(United States) Ryan Harrison (United States) Alex Kuznetsov	(France) Kenny de Schepper (Argentina) Juan Ignacio Londero	(Czech Republic) Jiří Veselý (Tunisia) Malek Jaziri (France) David Guez (Belgium) David Goffin
May 12	Busan Open Challenger Tour; Busan, South Korea; Hard – $75,000+H – 32S/32Q/16D; Singles – Doubles	(Japan) Go Soeda; 6–3, 7–6^{(7–5)}	(Chinese Taipei) Jimmy Wang	(South Korea) Chung Hyeon (Switzerland) Marco Chiudinelli	(United States) Austin Krajicek (Israel) Amir Weintraub (Russia) Konstantin Kravchuk (South Korea) Nam Ji-sung
May 12	Busan Open Challenger Tour; Busan, South Korea; Hard – $75,000+H – 32S/32Q/16D; Singles – Doubles	(Thailand) Sanchai Ratiwatana (Thailand) Sonchat Ratiwatana; 6–4, 6–4	(United Kingdom) Jamie Delgado (Australia) John-Patrick Smith	(South Korea) Chung Hyeon (Switzerland) Marco Chiudinelli	(United States) Austin Krajicek (Israel) Amir Weintraub (Russia) Konstantin Kravchuk (South Korea) Nam Ji-sung
May 12	Heilbronner Neckarcup; Heilbronn, Germany; Clay – €35,000+H – 32S/32Q/16D; Singles – Doubles	(Germany) Jan-Lennard Struff; 6–2, 7–6^{(7–5)}	(Hungary) Márton Fucsovics	(Australia) Thanasi Kokkinakis (Slovakia) Andrej Martin	(Brazil) André Ghem (Turkey) Marsel İlhan (Russia) Andrey Kuznetsov (Slovenia) Blaž Kavčič
May 12	Heilbronner Neckarcup; Heilbronn, Germany; Clay – €35,000+H – 32S/32Q/16D; Singles – Doubles	(Germany) Andre Begemann (Germany) Tim Pütz; 6–3, 6–3	(Netherlands) Jesse Huta Galung (Australia) Rameez Junaid	(Australia) Thanasi Kokkinakis (Slovakia) Andrej Martin	(Brazil) André Ghem (Turkey) Marsel İlhan (Russia) Andrey Kuznetsov (Slovenia) Blaž Kavčič
May 12	Samarkand Challenger; Samarkand, Uzbekistan; Clay – $50,000 – 32S/32Q/16D; Singles – Doubles	(Uzbekistan) Farrukh Dustov; 7–6^{(7–4)}, 6–1	(Russia) Aslan Karatsev	(Netherlands) Boy Westerhof (Austria) Gerald Melzer	(Russia) Karen Khachanov (Russia) Valery Rudnev (Russia) Alexander Lobkov (Belarus) Aliaksandr Bury
May 12	Samarkand Challenger; Samarkand, Uzbekistan; Clay – $50,000 – 32S/32Q/16D; Singles – Doubles	(Belarus) Sergey Betov (Belarus) Aliaksandr Bury; 6–4, 6–3	(Uzbekistan) Shonigmatjon Shofayziyev (Uzbekistan) Vaja Uzakov	(Netherlands) Boy Westerhof (Austria) Gerald Melzer	(Russia) Karen Khachanov (Russia) Valery Rudnev (Russia) Alexander Lobkov (Belarus) Aliaksandr Bury
May 19	Karshi Challenger; Qarshi, Uzbekistan; Hard – $50,000 – 32S/32Q/16D; Singles – Doubles	(Georgia (country)) Nikoloz Basilashvili; 7–6^{(7–2)}, 6–2	(United States) Chase Buchanan	(India) Jeevan Nedunchezhiyan (Russia) Aslan Karatsev	(Russia) Alexander Kudryavtsev (Russia) Mikhail Ledovskikh (Japan) Yasutaka Uchiyama (India) Saketh Myneni
May 19	Karshi Challenger; Qarshi, Uzbekistan; Hard – $50,000 – 32S/32Q/16D; Singles – Doubles	(Belarus) Sergey Betov (Belarus) Aliaksandr Bury; 7–5, 1–6, [10–6]	(China) Gong Maoxin (Chinese Taipei) Peng Hsien-yin	(India) Jeevan Nedunchezhiyan (Russia) Aslan Karatsev	(Russia) Alexander Kudryavtsev (Russia) Mikhail Ledovskikh (Japan) Yasutaka Uchiyama (India) Saketh Myneni
May 26	Internazionali di Tennis Città di Vicenza; Vicenza, Italy; Clay – €42,500 – 32S/32Q/16D; Singles – Doubles	(Serbia) Filip Krajinović; 6–4, 6–4	(Slovakia) Norbert Gomboš	(Japan) Yoshihito Nishioka (Spain) Gerard Granollers	(Slovakia) Andrej Martin (Argentina) Juan Ignacio Londero (Italy) Matteo Donati (Belgium) Ruben Bemelmans
May 26	Internazionali di Tennis Città di Vicenza; Vicenza, Italy; Clay – €42,500 – 32S/32Q/16D; Singles – Doubles	(Slovakia) Andrej Martin (Slovakia) Igor Zelenay; 6–1, 7–5	(Poland) Błażej Koniusz (Poland) Mateusz Kowalczyk	(Japan) Yoshihito Nishioka (Spain) Gerard Granollers	(Slovakia) Andrej Martin (Argentina) Juan Ignacio Londero (Italy) Matteo Donati (Belgium) Ruben Bemelmans

=== June ===
Week of	Tournament	Champions	Runners-up	Semifinalists	Quarterfinalists
June 2	UniCredit Czech Open; Prostějov, Czech Republic; Clay – €106,500+H – 32S/27Q/16D; Singles – Doubles	(Czech Republic) Jiří Veselý; 6–2, 6–2	(Slovakia) Norbert Gomboš	(Czech Republic) Radek Štěpánek (Czech Republic) Adam Pavlásek	(France) Axel Michon (Kazakhstan) Mikhail Kukushkin (Czech Republic) Lukáš Rosol (Germany) Julian Reister
June 2	UniCredit Czech Open; Prostějov, Czech Republic; Clay – €106,500+H – 32S/27Q/16D; Singles – Doubles	(Germany) Andre Begemann (Czech Republic) Lukáš Rosol; 6–1, 6–2	(Canada) Peter Polansky (Canada) Adil Shamasdin	(Czech Republic) Radek Štěpánek (Czech Republic) Adam Pavlásek	(France) Axel Michon (Kazakhstan) Mikhail Kukushkin (Czech Republic) Lukáš Rosol (Germany) Julian Reister
June 2	Aegon Trophy; Nottingham, Great Britain; Grass – €64,000 – 32S/32Q/16D; Singles – Doubles	(Cyprus) Marcos Baghdatis; 6–4, 6–3	(Australia) Marinko Matosevic	(Netherlands) Igor Sijsling (Luxembourg) Gilles Müller	(Austria) Martin Fischer (France) Kenny de Schepper (Bulgaria) Dimitar Kutrovsky (United States) Steve Johnson
June 2	Aegon Trophy; Nottingham, Great Britain; Grass – €64,000 – 32S/32Q/16D; Singles – Doubles	(Australia) Chris Guccione (United States) Rajeev Ram; 6–7^{(2–7)}, 6–2, [11–9]	(United Kingdom) Colin Fleming (Brazil) Andre Sá	(Netherlands) Igor Sijsling (Luxembourg) Gilles Müller	(Austria) Martin Fischer (France) Kenny de Schepper (Bulgaria) Dimitar Kutrovsky (United States) Steve Johnson
June 2	XII Venice Challenge Save Cup; Mestre, Italy; Clay – €42,500+H – 32S/22Q/16D; Singles – Doubles	(Uruguay) Pablo Cuevas; 6–4, 4–6, 6–2	(Italy) Marco Cecchinato	(Italy) Paolo Lorenzi (Spain) Daniel Gimeno Traver	(Italy) Thomas Fabbiano (Argentina) Andrea Collarini (Italy) Andrea Arnaboldi (Argentina) Facundo Bagnis
June 2	XII Venice Challenge Save Cup; Mestre, Italy; Clay – €42,500+H – 32S/22Q/16D; Singles – Doubles	(Uruguay) Pablo Cuevas (Argentina) Horacio Zeballos; 6–4, 6–1	(Italy) Daniele Bracciali (Italy) Potito Starace	(Italy) Paolo Lorenzi (Spain) Daniel Gimeno Traver	(Italy) Thomas Fabbiano (Argentina) Andrea Collarini (Italy) Andrea Arnaboldi (Argentina) Facundo Bagnis
June 2	BRD Arad Challenger; Arad, Romania; Clay – €35,000+H – 32S/22Q/16D; Singles – Doubles	(Bosnia and Herzegovina) Damir Džumhur; 6–4, 7–6^{(7–3)}	(Spain) Pere Riba	(France) Lucas Pouille (United States) Chase Buchanan	(Romania) Petru-Alexandru Luncanu (Uruguay) Martín Cuevas (Serbia) Nikola Ćaćić (Belarus) Uladzimir Ignatik
June 2	BRD Arad Challenger; Arad, Romania; Clay – €35,000+H – 32S/22Q/16D; Singles – Doubles	(Croatia) Franko Škugor (Croatia) Antonio Veić; 6–4, 7–6^{(7–3)}	(Moldova) Radu Albot (New Zealand) Artem Sitak	(France) Lucas Pouille (United States) Chase Buchanan	(Romania) Petru-Alexandru Luncanu (Uruguay) Martín Cuevas (Serbia) Nikola Ćaćić (Belarus) Uladzimir Ignatik
June 2	Franken Challenge; Fürth, Germany; Clay – €35,000+H – 32S/24Q/16D; Singles – Doubles	(Germany) Tobias Kamke; 6–3, 6–2	(Spain) Íñigo Cervantes Huegun	(Slovakia) Andrej Martin (Austria) Andreas Haider-Maurer	(Ecuador) Giovanni Lapentti (Spain) Adrián Menéndez Maceiras (France) Grégoire Burquier (Republic of Ireland) Louk Sorensen
June 2	Franken Challenge; Fürth, Germany; Clay – €35,000+H – 32S/24Q/16D; Singles – Doubles	(Spain) Gerard Granollers (Spain) Jordi Samper Montaña; 7–6^{(7–1)}, 6–2	(Spain) Adrián Menéndez Maceiras (Spain) Rubén Ramírez Hidalgo	(Slovakia) Andrej Martin (Austria) Andreas Haider-Maurer	(Ecuador) Giovanni Lapentti (Spain) Adrián Menéndez Maceiras (France) Grégoire Burquier (Republic of Ireland) Louk Sorensen
June 9	Città di Caltanissetta; Caltanissetta, Italy; Clay – €106,500+H – 32S/24Q/16D; Singles – Doubles	(Spain) Pablo Carreño; 4–6, 6–4, 6–1	(Argentina) Facundo Bagnis	(Brazil) João Souza (Chile) Gonzalo Lama	(Uruguay) Pablo Cuevas (Croatia) Mate Delić (Italy) Potito Starace (Spain) Pablo Andújar
June 9	Città di Caltanissetta; Caltanissetta, Italy; Clay – €106,500+H – 32S/24Q/16D; Singles – Doubles	(Italy) Daniele Bracciali (Italy) Potito Starace; 6–3, 6–3	(Spain) Pablo Carreño (Spain) Enrique López Pérez	(Brazil) João Souza (Chile) Gonzalo Lama	(Uruguay) Pablo Cuevas (Croatia) Mate Delić (Italy) Potito Starace (Spain) Pablo Andújar
June 9	Aegon Nottingham Challenge; Nottingham, Great Britain; Grass – €64,000 – 32S/32Q/16D; Singles – Doubles	(Australia) Nick Kyrgios; 7–6^{(7–3)}, 7–6^{(9–7)}	(Australia) Samuel Groth	(Slovakia) Miloslav Mečíř Jr. (United States) Rajeev Ram	(Serbia) Filip Krajinović (Romania) Marius Copil (Japan) Tatsuma Ito (Luxembourg) Gilles Müller
June 9	Aegon Nottingham Challenge; Nottingham, Great Britain; Grass – €64,000 – 32S/32Q/16D; Singles – Doubles	(Australia) Rameez Junaid (New Zealand) Michael Venus; 4–6, 7–6^{(7–1)}, [10–6]	(Belgium) Ruben Bemelmans (Japan) Go Soeda	(Slovakia) Miloslav Mečíř Jr. (United States) Rajeev Ram	(Serbia) Filip Krajinović (Romania) Marius Copil (Japan) Tatsuma Ito (Luxembourg) Gilles Müller
June 9	Fergana Challenger; Fergana, Uzbekistan; Hard – $50,000 – 32S/29Q/16D; Singles – Doubles	(Slovenia) Blaž Kavčič; 6–4, 7–6^{(10–8)}	(Russia) Alexander Kudryavtsev	(Ukraine) Denys Molchanov (Belarus) Egor Gerasimov	(Russia) Alexander Lobkov (Japan) Shuichi Sekiguchi (Colombia) Nicolás Barrientos (Russia) Valery Rudnev
June 9	Fergana Challenger; Fergana, Uzbekistan; Hard – $50,000 – 32S/29Q/16D; Singles – Doubles	(Belarus) Sergey Betov (Belarus) Aliaksandr Bury; 6–7^{(6–8)}, 7–6^{(7–1)}, [10–3]	(Colombia) Nicolás Barrientos (Russia) Stanislav Vovk	(Ukraine) Denys Molchanov (Belarus) Egor Gerasimov	(Russia) Alexander Lobkov (Japan) Shuichi Sekiguchi (Colombia) Nicolás Barrientos (Russia) Valery Rudnev
June 9	Prague Open; Prague, Czech Republic; Clay – €42,500 – 32S/32Q/16D; Singles – Doubles	(Czech Republic) Lukáš Rosol; 3–6, 6–4, 6–4	(Czech Republic) Jiří Veselý	(Switzerland) Michael Lammer (China) Zhang Ze	(Italy) Lorenzo Giustino (Italy) Roberto Marcora (Canada) Steven Diez (Spain) Rubén Ramírez Hidalgo
June 9	Prague Open; Prague, Czech Republic; Clay – €42,500 – 32S/32Q/16D; Singles – Doubles	(Czech Republic) Roman Jebavý (Czech Republic) Jiří Veselý; 6–1, 6–3	(Chinese Taipei) Lee Hsin-han (China) Zhang Ze	(Switzerland) Michael Lammer (China) Zhang Ze	(Italy) Lorenzo Giustino (Italy) Roberto Marcora (Canada) Steven Diez (Spain) Rubén Ramírez Hidalgo
June 9	Internationaux de Tennis de Blois; Blois, France; Clay – €35,000+H – 32S/12Q/16D; Singles – Doubles	(Argentina) Máximo González; 6–2, 6–3	(Portugal) Gastão Elias	(France) Gianni Mina (France) Mathieu Rodrigues	(France) Jonathan Eysseric (Peru) Duilio Beretta (Spain) Roberto Ortega Olmedo (France) Vincent Millot
June 9	Internationaux de Tennis de Blois; Blois, France; Clay – €35,000+H – 32S/12Q/16D; Singles – Doubles	(France) Tristan Lamasine (France) Laurent Lokoli; 7–5, 6–0	(Argentina) Guillermo Durán (Argentina) Máximo González	(France) Gianni Mina (France) Mathieu Rodrigues	(France) Jonathan Eysseric (Peru) Duilio Beretta (Spain) Roberto Ortega Olmedo (France) Vincent Millot
June 9	Košice Open; Košice, Slovakia; Clay – €35,000+H – 32S/22Q/16D; Singles – Doubles	(Canada) Frank Dancevic; 6–2, 3–6, 6–2	(Slovakia) Norbert Gomboš	(France) Lucas Pouille (Belarus) Uladzimir Ignatik	(Bosnia and Herzegovina) Aldin Šetkić (Moldova) Radu Albot (Brazil) André Ghem (Argentina) Facundo Argüello
June 9	Košice Open; Košice, Slovakia; Clay – €35,000+H – 32S/22Q/16D; Singles – Doubles	(Argentina) Facundo Argüello (Uruguay) Ariel Behar; 6–4, 7–6^{(7–4)}	(Poland) Andriej Kapaś (Poland) Błażej Koniusz	(France) Lucas Pouille (Belarus) Uladzimir Ignatik	(Bosnia and Herzegovina) Aldin Šetkić (Moldova) Radu Albot (Brazil) André Ghem (Argentina) Facundo Argüello
June 16	Tianjin Health Industry Park; Tianjin, China; Hard – $50,000+H – 32S/31Q/16D; Singles – Doubles	(Slovenia) Blaž Kavčič; 6–2, 3–6, 7–5	(Russia) Alexander Kudryavtsev	(China) Wu Di (Russia) Valery Rudnev	(Chinese Taipei) Chen Ti (France) Josselin Ouanna (Russia) Mikhail Ledovskikh (Thailand) Danai Udomchoke
June 16	Tianjin Health Industry Park; Tianjin, China; Hard – $50,000+H – 32S/31Q/16D; Singles – Doubles	(Germany) Robin Kern (France) Josselin Ouanna; 6–7^{(3–7)}, 7–5, [10–8]	(United States) Jason Jung (United States) Evan King	(China) Wu Di (Russia) Valery Rudnev	(Chinese Taipei) Chen Ti (France) Josselin Ouanna (Russia) Mikhail Ledovskikh (Thailand) Danai Udomchoke
June 16	Morocco Tennis Tour – Mohammedia; Mohammedia, Morocco; Clay – €42,500 – 32S/14Q/16D; Singles – Doubles	(Spain) Pablo Carreño; 7–6^{(7–2)}, 2–6, 6–2	(Spain) Daniel Muñoz de la Nava	(Belgium) Joris De Loore (Chile) Nicolás Jarry	(Brazil) Fabiano de Paula (Spain) Juan-Samuel Arauzo-Martínez (Serbia) Peđa Krstin (Egypt) Sherif Sabry
June 16	Morocco Tennis Tour – Mohammedia; Mohammedia, Morocco; Clay – €42,500 – 32S/14Q/16D; Singles – Doubles	(Brazil) Fabiano de Paula (Egypt) Mohamed Safwat; 6–2, 3–6, [10–6]	(Germany) Richard Becker (France) Élie Rousset	(Belgium) Joris De Loore (Chile) Nicolás Jarry	(Brazil) Fabiano de Paula (Spain) Juan-Samuel Arauzo-Martínez (Serbia) Peđa Krstin (Egypt) Sherif Sabry
June 16	Aspria Tennis Cup – Trofeo CDI; Milan, Italy; Clay – €35,000+H – 32S/32Q/16D; Singles – Doubles	(Spain) Albert Ramos; 6–3, 7–5	(Spain) Pere Riba	(Argentina) Máximo González (Italy) Marco Cecchinato	(Ukraine) Artem Smirnov (Argentina) Facundo Argüello (Croatia) Antonio Veić (Spain) Juan Lizariturry
June 16	Aspria Tennis Cup – Trofeo CDI; Milan, Italy; Clay – €35,000+H – 32S/32Q/16D; Singles – Doubles	(Argentina) Guillermo Durán (Argentina) Máximo González; 6–3, 6–3	(United States) James Cerretani (Germany) Frank Moser	(Argentina) Máximo González (Italy) Marco Cecchinato	(Ukraine) Artem Smirnov (Argentina) Facundo Argüello (Croatia) Antonio Veić (Spain) Juan Lizariturry
June 23	ATP Challenger China International – Nanchang; Nanchang, China; Hard – $50,000+H – 32S/24Q/16D; Singles – Doubles	(Japan) Go Soeda; 6–3, 2–6, 7–6^{(7–3)}	(Slovenia) Blaž Kavčič	(China) Zhang Ze (South Korea) Chung Hyeon	(Chinese Taipei) Yang Tsung-hua (United States) Jason Jung (Russia) Alexander Kudryavtsev (Japan) Toshihide Matsui
June 23	ATP Challenger China International – Nanchang; Nanchang, China; Hard – $50,000+H – 32S/24Q/16D; Singles – Doubles	(Chinese Taipei) Chen Ti (Chinese Taipei) Peng Hsien-yin; 6–2, 3–6, [12–10]	(Australia) Jordan Kerr (France) Fabrice Martin	(China) Zhang Ze (South Korea) Chung Hyeon	(Chinese Taipei) Yang Tsung-hua (United States) Jason Jung (Russia) Alexander Kudryavtsev (Japan) Toshihide Matsui
June 23	Challenger Team "Citta' di Padova"; Padova, Italy; Clay – €42,500 – 32S/23Q/16D; Singles – Doubles	(Argentina) Máximo González; 6–3, 6–4	(Spain) Albert Ramos	(Spain) Jordi Samper Montaña (Serbia) Nikola Ćaćić	(Croatia) Antonio Veić (Italy) Alessandro Giannessi (Argentina) Renzo Olivo (Italy) Matteo Viola
June 23	Challenger Team "Citta' di Padova"; Padova, Italy; Clay – €42,500 – 32S/23Q/16D; Singles – Doubles	(Venezuela) Roberto Maytín (Argentina) Andrés Molteni; 6–2, 3–6, [10–8]	(Argentina) Guillermo Durán (Argentina) Máximo González	(Spain) Jordi Samper Montaña (Serbia) Nikola Ćaćić	(Croatia) Antonio Veić (Italy) Alessandro Giannessi (Argentina) Renzo Olivo (Italy) Matteo Viola
June 23	Marburg Open; Marburg, Germany; Clay – €35,000+H – 32S/31Q/16D; Singles – Doubles	(Argentina) Horacio Zeballos; 3–6, 6–3, 6–3	(Netherlands) Thiemo de Bakker	(Germany) Andreas Beck (Brazil) João Souza	(Argentina) Diego Sebastián Schwartzman (Spain) Roberto Carballés Baena (Argentina) Martín Alund (Switzerland) Henri Laaksonen
June 23	Marburg Open; Marburg, Germany; Clay – €35,000+H – 32S/31Q/16D; Singles – Doubles	(Czech Republic) Jaroslav Pospíšil (Croatia) Franko Škugor; 6–4, 6–4	(Argentina) Diego Sebastián Schwartzman (Argentina) Horacio Zeballos	(Germany) Andreas Beck (Brazil) João Souza	(Argentina) Diego Sebastián Schwartzman (Spain) Roberto Carballés Baena (Argentina) Martín Alund (Switzerland) Henri Laaksonen
June 30	Sparkassen Open; Braunschweig, Germany; Clay – €106,500+H – 32S/32Q/16D; Singles – Doubles	(Germany) Alexander Zverev; 1–6, 6–1, 6–4	(France) Paul-Henri Mathieu	(Kazakhstan) Andrey Golubev (Serbia) Nikola Ćaćić	(Germany) Philipp Petzschner (Brazil) João Souza (Portugal) Gastão Elias (Argentina) Diego Sebastián Schwartzman
June 30	Sparkassen Open; Braunschweig, Germany; Clay – €106,500+H – 32S/32Q/16D; Singles – Doubles	(Sweden) Andreas Siljeström (Slovakia) Igor Zelenay; 7–5, 6–4	(Australia) Rameez Junaid (Slovakia) Michal Mertiňák	(Kazakhstan) Andrey Golubev (Serbia) Nikola Ćaćić	(Germany) Philipp Petzschner (Brazil) João Souza (Portugal) Gastão Elias (Argentina) Diego Sebastián Schwartzman
June 30	Nielsen Pro Tennis Championship; Winnetka, United States; Hard – $50,000 – 32S/30Q/16D; Singles – Doubles	(United States) Denis Kudla; 6–2, 6–2	(Uzbekistan) Farrukh Dustov	(United States) Mackenzie McDonald (Australia) John-Patrick Smith	(United States) Austin Krajicek (Switzerland) Adrien Bossel (Ukraine) Illya Marchenko (United States) Tim Smyczek
June 30	Nielsen Pro Tennis Championship; Winnetka, United States; Hard – $50,000 – 32S/30Q/16D; Singles – Doubles	(Australia) Thanasi Kokkinakis (United States) Denis Kudla; 6–2, 7–6^{(7–4)}	(United States) Evan King (United States) Raymond Sarmiento	(United States) Mackenzie McDonald (Australia) John-Patrick Smith	(United States) Austin Krajicek (Switzerland) Adrien Bossel (Ukraine) Illya Marchenko (United States) Tim Smyczek
June 30	Trofeo Ricardo Delgado Aray; Manta, Ecuador; Hard – $40,000+H – 32S/32Q/16D; Singles – Doubles	(France) Adrian Mannarino; 4–6, 6–3, 6–2	(Argentina) Guido Andreozzi	(United States) Chase Buchanan (Ecuador) Emilio Gómez	(Argentina) Juan Ignacio Londero (Canada) Peter Polansky (Argentina) Facundo Argüello (Japan) Tatsuma Ito
June 30	Trofeo Ricardo Delgado Aray; Manta, Ecuador; Hard – $40,000+H – 32S/32Q/16D; Singles – Doubles	(United States) Chase Buchanan (Canada) Peter Polansky; 6–4, 6–4	(Venezuela) Luis David Martínez (Colombia) Eduardo Struvay	(United States) Chase Buchanan (Ecuador) Emilio Gómez	(Argentina) Juan Ignacio Londero (Canada) Peter Polansky (Argentina) Facundo Argüello (Japan) Tatsuma Ito
June 30	Distal & ITR Group Tennis Cup; Todi, Italy; Clay – €35,000+H – 32S/32Q/16D; Singles – Doubles	(Slovenia) Aljaž Bedene; 2–6, 7–6^{(7–4)}, 6–4	(Hungary) Márton Fucsovics	(Austria) Andreas Haider-Maurer (Spain) Enrique López Pérez	(Spain) Rubén Ramírez Hidalgo (Austria) Martin Fischer (Slovakia) Norbert Gomboš (Argentina) Máximo González
June 30	Distal & ITR Group Tennis Cup; Todi, Italy; Clay – €35,000+H – 32S/32Q/16D; Singles – Doubles	(Argentina) Guillermo Durán (Argentina) Máximo González; 6–1, 3–6, [10–7]	(Italy) Riccardo Ghedin (Germany) Claudio Grassi	(Austria) Andreas Haider-Maurer (Spain) Enrique López Pérez	(Spain) Rubén Ramírez Hidalgo (Austria) Martin Fischer (Slovakia) Norbert Gomboš (Argentina) Máximo González

=== July ===
Week of	Tournament	Champions	Runners-up	Semifinalists	Quarterfinalists
July 7	Sport 1 Open; Scheveningen, Netherlands; Clay – €42,500+H – 32S/16Q/16D; Singles – Doubles	(Belgium) David Goffin; 6–3, 6–2	(Germany) Andreas Beck	(Netherlands) Jesse Huta Galung (Brazil) João Souza	(Austria) Martin Fischer (Kazakhstan) Aleksandr Nedovyesov (Italy) Matteo Viola (Argentina) Horacio Zeballos
July 7	Sport 1 Open; Scheveningen, Netherlands; Clay – €42,500+H – 32S/16Q/16D; Singles – Doubles	(Netherlands) Matwé Middelkoop (Netherlands) Boy Westerhof; 6–4, 3–6, [10–6]	(Austria) Martin Fischer (Netherlands) Jesse Huta Galung	(Netherlands) Jesse Huta Galung (Brazil) João Souza	(Austria) Martin Fischer (Kazakhstan) Aleksandr Nedovyesov (Italy) Matteo Viola (Argentina) Horacio Zeballos
July 7	Tilia Slovenia Open; Portorož, Slovenia; Hard – €42,500 – 32S/27Q/16D; Singles – Doubles	(Slovenia) Blaž Kavčič; 7–5, 6–7^{(4–7)}, 6–1	(Luxembourg) Gilles Müller	(Russia) Evgeny Donskoy (United Kingdom) Kyle Edmund	(Croatia) Nikola Mektić (Italy) Thomas Fabbiano (Belgium) Niels Desein (United Kingdom) Daniel Cox
July 7	Tilia Slovenia Open; Portorož, Slovenia; Hard – €42,500 – 32S/27Q/16D; Singles – Doubles	(Belarus) Sergey Betov (Belarus) Aliaksandr Bury; 6–0, 6–3	(Serbia) Ilija Bozoljac (Italy) Flavio Cipolla	(Russia) Evgeny Donskoy (United Kingdom) Kyle Edmund	(Croatia) Nikola Mektić (Italy) Thomas Fabbiano (Belgium) Niels Desein (United Kingdom) Daniel Cox
July 7	San Benedetto Tennis Cup; San Benedetto del Tronto, Italy; Clay – €35,000+H – 32S/31Q/16D; Singles – Doubles	(Bosnia and Herzegovina) Damir Džumhur; 6–3, 6–3	(Austria) Andreas Haider-Maurer	(Slovakia) Andrej Martin (Slovakia) Norbert Gomboš	(France) Axel Michon (Spain) Rubén Ramírez Hidalgo (Croatia) Borna Ćorić (Argentina) Máximo González
July 7	San Benedetto Tennis Cup; San Benedetto del Tronto, Italy; Clay – €35,000+H – 32S/31Q/16D; Singles – Doubles	(Italy) Daniele Giorgini (Italy) Potito Starace; 6–3, 6–7^{(3–7)}, [10–5]	(Bolivia) Hugo Dellien (Peru) Sergio Galdós	(Slovakia) Andrej Martin (Slovakia) Norbert Gomboš	(France) Axel Michon (Spain) Rubén Ramírez Hidalgo (Croatia) Borna Ćorić (Argentina) Máximo González
July 14	OEC Kaohsiung; Kaohsiung, Taiwan; Hard – $125,000+H – 32S/28Q/16D; Singles – Doubles	(Chinese Taipei) Lu Yen-hsun; 6–7^{(7–9)}, 6–4, 6–4	(Italy) Luca Vanni	(Russia) Alexander Kudryavtsev (Japan) Yūichi Sugita	(Switzerland) Marco Chiudinelli (Japan) Go Soeda (Ukraine) Denys Molchanov (Italy) Thomas Fabbiano
July 14	OEC Kaohsiung; Kaohsiung, Taiwan; Hard – $125,000+H – 32S/28Q/16D; Singles – Doubles	(China) Gong Maoxin (Chinese Taipei) Peng Hsien-yin; 6–3, 6–2	(Chinese Taipei) Chen Ti (Chinese Taipei) Huang Liang-chi	(Russia) Alexander Kudryavtsev (Japan) Yūichi Sugita	(Switzerland) Marco Chiudinelli (Japan) Go Soeda (Ukraine) Denys Molchanov (Italy) Thomas Fabbiano
July 14	Challenger Banque Nationale de Granby; Granby, Canada; Hard – $50,000+H – 32S/25Q/16D; Singles – Doubles	(Japan) Hiroki Moriya; 7–5, 6–7^{(4–7)}, 6–3	(France) Fabrice Martin	(Republic of Ireland) James McGee (Australia) Benjamin Mitchell	(United Kingdom) Richard Gabb (France) Vincent Millot (United States) Chase Buchanan (Australia) Luke Saville
July 14	Challenger Banque Nationale de Granby; Granby, Canada; Hard – $50,000+H – 32S/25Q/16D; Singles – Doubles	(New Zealand) Marcus Daniell (New Zealand) Artem Sitak; 7–6^{(7–5)}, 5–7, [10–5]	(Australia) Jordan Kerr (France) Fabrice Martin	(Republic of Ireland) James McGee (Australia) Benjamin Mitchell	(United Kingdom) Richard Gabb (France) Vincent Millot (United States) Chase Buchanan (Australia) Luke Saville
July 14	Levene Gouldin & Thompson Tennis Challenger; Binghamton, United States; Hard – $50,000 – 32S/16Q/16D; Singles – Doubles	(Ukraine) Sergiy Stakhovsky; 6–4, 7–6^{(11–9)}	(United States) Wayne Odesnik	(Zimbabwe) Takanyi Garanganga (United Kingdom) Daniel Cox	(United States) Bradley Klahn (United States) Ernesto Escobedo (Barbados) Darian King (Australia) Thanasi Kokkinakis
July 14	Levene Gouldin & Thompson Tennis Challenger; Binghamton, United States; Hard – $50,000 – 32S/16Q/16D; Singles – Doubles	(United Kingdom) Daniel Cox (United Kingdom) Daniel Smethurst; 6–7^{(3–7)}, 6–2, [10–6]	(Romania) Marius Copil (Ukraine) Sergiy Stakhovsky	(Zimbabwe) Takanyi Garanganga (United Kingdom) Daniel Cox	(United States) Bradley Klahn (United States) Ernesto Escobedo (Barbados) Darian King (Australia) Thanasi Kokkinakis
July 14	Poznań Open; Poznań, Poland; Clay – €35,000+H – 32S/32Q/16D; Singles – Doubles	(Belgium) David Goffin; 6–4, 6–2	(Slovenia) Blaž Rola	(Brazil) João Souza (Czech Republic) Adam Pavlásek	(Portugal) Rui Machado (Romania) Adrian Ungur (Argentina) Martín Alund (Austria) Andreas Haider-Maurer
July 14	Poznań Open; Poznań, Poland; Clay – €35,000+H – 32S/32Q/16D; Singles – Doubles	(Moldova) Radu Albot (Czech Republic) Adam Pavlásek; 7–5, 2–6, [10–8]	(Poland) Tomasz Bednarek (Finland) Henri Kontinen	(Brazil) João Souza (Czech Republic) Adam Pavlásek	(Portugal) Rui Machado (Romania) Adrian Ungur (Argentina) Martín Alund (Austria) Andreas Haider-Maurer
July 14	Guzzini Challenger; Recanati, Italy; Hard – €35,000+H – 32S/26Q/16D; Singles – Doubles	(Luxembourg) Gilles Müller; 6–1, 6–2	(Serbia) Ilija Bozoljac	(Russia) Konstantin Kravchuk (Hungary) Márton Fucsovics	(Italy) Salvatore Caruso (Italy) Stefano Napolitano (Spain) Adrián Menéndez Maceiras (Spain) Daniel Muñoz de la Nava
July 14	Guzzini Challenger; Recanati, Italy; Hard – €35,000+H – 32S/26Q/16D; Singles – Doubles	(Serbia) Ilija Bozoljac (Serbia) Goran Tošić; 5–7, 6–4, [10–5]	(Republic of Ireland) James Cluskey (Lithuania) Laurynas Grigelis	(Russia) Konstantin Kravchuk (Hungary) Márton Fucsovics	(Italy) Salvatore Caruso (Italy) Stefano Napolitano (Spain) Adrián Menéndez Maceiras (Spain) Daniel Muñoz de la Nava
July 21	President's Cup; Astana, Kazakhstan; Hard – $125,000 – 32S/27Q/16D; Singles – Doubles	(Lithuania) Ričardas Berankis; 7–5, 5–7, 6–3	(Turkey) Marsel İlhan	(Belarus) Egor Gerasimov (United Kingdom) Kyle Edmund	(Kazakhstan) Mikhail Kukushkin (Italy) Flavio Cipolla (Spain) Adrián Menéndez Maceiras (Slovenia) Blaž Kavčič
July 21	President's Cup; Astana, Kazakhstan; Hard – $125,000 – 32S/27Q/16D; Singles – Doubles	(Ukraine) Sergei Bubka (Switzerland) Marco Chiudinelli; 6–3, 6–4	(Chinese Taipei) Chen Ti (Chinese Taipei) Huang Liang-chi	(Belarus) Egor Gerasimov (United Kingdom) Kyle Edmund	(Kazakhstan) Mikhail Kukushkin (Italy) Flavio Cipolla (Spain) Adrián Menéndez Maceiras (Slovenia) Blaž Kavčič
July 21	Kentucky Bank Tennis Championships; Lexington, United States; Hard – $50,000 – 32S/31Q/16D; Singles – Doubles	(Australia) James Duckworth; 6–3, 6–4	(United Kingdom) James Ward	(United States) Wayne Odesnik (Australia) Thanasi Kokkinakis	(Republic of Ireland) James McGee (France) Vincent Millot (Belgium) Ruben Bemelmans (United States) Chase Buchanan
July 21	Kentucky Bank Tennis Championships; Lexington, United States; Hard – $50,000 – 32S/31Q/16D; Singles – Doubles	(Canada) Peter Polansky (Canada) Adil Shamasdin; 6–4, 6–2	(Republic of Ireland) James McGee (United States) Chase Buchanan	(United States) Wayne Odesnik (Australia) Thanasi Kokkinakis	(Republic of Ireland) James McGee (France) Vincent Millot (Belgium) Ruben Bemelmans (United States) Chase Buchanan
July 21	Tampere Open; Tampere, Finland; Clay – €42,500 – 32S/27Q/16D; Singles – Doubles	(Belgium) David Goffin; 7–6^{(7–3)}, 6–3	(Finland) Jarkko Nieminen	(Ecuador) Giovanni Lapentti (Serbia) Peđa Krstin	(Brazil) Rogério Dutra Silva (France) Laurent Lokoli (Spain) Rubén Ramírez Hidalgo (Sweden) Elias Ymer
July 21	Tampere Open; Tampere, Finland; Clay – €42,500 – 32S/27Q/16D; Singles – Doubles	(Philippines) Ruben Gonzales (United Kingdom) Sean Thornley; 6–7^{(5–7)}, 7–6^{(12–10)}, [10–8]	(Sweden) Elias Ymer (Russia) Anton Zaitcev	(Ecuador) Giovanni Lapentti (Serbia) Peđa Krstin	(Brazil) Rogério Dutra Silva (France) Laurent Lokoli (Spain) Rubén Ramírez Hidalgo (Sweden) Elias Ymer
July 21	Oberstaufen Cup; Oberstaufen, Germany; Clay – €35,000+H – 32S/20Q/16D; Singles – Doubles	(Italy) Simone Bolelli; 6–4, 7–6^{(7–2)}	(Germany) Michael Berrer	(Germany) Andreas Beck (Italy) Roberto Marcora	(Czech Republic) Jan Hájek (Austria) Gibril Diarra (Hungary) Márton Fucsovics (Germany) Peter Gojowczyk
July 21	Oberstaufen Cup; Oberstaufen, Germany; Clay – €35,000+H – 32S/20Q/16D; Singles – Doubles	(Netherlands) Wesley Koolhof (Italy) Alessandro Motti; 7–6^{(9–7)}, 6–3	(Moldova) Radu Albot (Poland) Mateusz Kowalczyk	(Germany) Andreas Beck (Italy) Roberto Marcora	(Czech Republic) Jan Hájek (Austria) Gibril Diarra (Hungary) Márton Fucsovics (Germany) Peter Gojowczyk
July 28	Odlum Brown Vancouver Open; Vancouver, Canada; Hard – $100,000 – 32S/28Q/16D; Singles – Doubles	(Cyprus) Marcos Baghdatis; 7–6^{(8–6)}, 6-3	(Uzbekistan) Farrukh Dustov	(Belgium) Ruben Bemelmans (United Kingdom) James Ward	(Japan) Taro Daniel (Russia) Alex Bogomolov Jr. (United States) Austin Krajicek (Australia) Thanasi Kokkinakis
July 28	Odlum Brown Vancouver Open; Vancouver, Canada; Hard – $100,000 – 32S/28Q/16D; Singles – Doubles	(United States) Austin Krajicek (Australia) John-Patrick Smith; 6–3, 4–6, [10–8]	(New Zealand) Marcus Daniell (New Zealand) Artem Sitak	(Belgium) Ruben Bemelmans (United Kingdom) James Ward	(Japan) Taro Daniel (Russia) Alex Bogomolov Jr. (United States) Austin Krajicek (Australia) Thanasi Kokkinakis
July 28	International Tennis Tournament of Cortina; Cortina d'Ampezzo, Italy; Clay – €42,500+H – 32S/23Q/16D; Singles – Doubles	(Serbia) Filip Krajinović; 2–6, 7–6^{(7–5)}, 7–5	(Italy) Federico Gaio	(Serbia) Viktor Troicki (Italy) Roberto Marcora	(Spain) Daniel Gimeno Traver (Germany) Matthias Bachinger (Belgium) Yannik Reuter (Italy) Potito Starace
July 28	International Tennis Tournament of Cortina; Cortina d'Ampezzo, Italy; Clay – €42,500+H – 32S/23Q/16D; Singles – Doubles	(Spain) Íñigo Cervantes Huegun (Spain) Juan Lizariturry; 7–5, 3–6, [10–8]	(Chinese Taipei) Lee Hsin-han (United States) Vahid Mirzadeh	(Serbia) Viktor Troicki (Italy) Roberto Marcora	(Spain) Daniel Gimeno Traver (Germany) Matthias Bachinger (Belgium) Yannik Reuter (Italy) Potito Starace
July 28	Open Castilla y León; Segovia, Spain; Hard – $42,500+H – 32S/32Q/16D; Singles – Doubles	(France) Adrian Mannarino; 6–3, 6–0	(Spain) Adrián Menéndez Maceiras	(Switzerland) Marco Chiudinelli (Russia) Alexander Kudryavtsev	(United Kingdom) Brydan Klein (Spain) Gerard Granollers (United Kingdom) Kyle Edmund (France) Florent Serra
July 28	Open Castilla y León; Segovia, Spain; Hard – $42,500+H – 32S/32Q/16D; Singles – Doubles	(Russia) Victor Baluda (Russia) Alexander Kudryavtsev; 6–2, 4–6, [10–3]	(United Kingdom) Brydan Klein (Croatia) Nikola Mektić	(Switzerland) Marco Chiudinelli (Russia) Alexander Kudryavtsev	(United Kingdom) Brydan Klein (Spain) Gerard Granollers (United Kingdom) Kyle Edmund (France) Florent Serra
July 28	Svijany Open; Liberec, Czech Republic; Clay – €35,000+H – 32S/30Q/16D; Singles – Doubles	(Slovakia) Andrej Martin; 1–6, 6–1, 6–4	(Argentina) Horacio Zeballos	(Chinese Taipei) Yang Tsung-hua (Slovenia) Blaž Rola	(Slovakia) Norbert Gomboš (Belarus) Uladzimir Ignatik (Belgium) Steve Darcis (Spain) Roberto Carballés Baena
July 28	Svijany Open; Liberec, Czech Republic; Clay – €35,000+H – 32S/30Q/16D; Singles – Doubles	(Czech Republic) Roman Jebavý (Czech Republic) Jaroslav Pospíšil; 6–4, 6–3	(Philippines) Ruben Gonzales (United Kingdom) Sean Thornley	(Chinese Taipei) Yang Tsung-hua (Slovenia) Blaž Rola	(Slovakia) Norbert Gomboš (Belarus) Uladzimir Ignatik (Belgium) Steve Darcis (Spain) Roberto Carballés Baena

=== August ===
Week of	Tournament	Champions	Runners-up	Semifinalists	Quarterfinalists
August 4	Comerica Bank Challenger; Aptos, United States; Hard – $100,000 – 32S/31Q/16D; Singles – Doubles	(Cyprus) Marcos Baghdatis; 7–6^{(9–7)}, 6-4	(Kazakhstan) Mikhail Kukushkin	(United States) Rhyne Williams (Japan) Go Soeda	(India) Somdev Devvarman (Argentina) Juan Ignacio Londero (Hungary) Márton Fucsovics (Belgium) Ruben Bemelmans
August 4	Comerica Bank Challenger; Aptos, United States; Hard – $100,000 – 32S/31Q/16D; Singles – Doubles	(Belgium) Ruben Bemelmans (Lithuania) Laurynas Grigelis; 6–3, 4–6, [11–9]	(India) Purav Raja (India) Sanam Singh	(United States) Rhyne Williams (Japan) Go Soeda	(India) Somdev Devvarman (Argentina) Juan Ignacio Londero (Hungary) Márton Fucsovics (Belgium) Ruben Bemelmans
August 4	San Marino GO&FUN Open; City of San Marino, San Marino; Clay – €64,000+H – 32S/32Q/16D; Singles – Doubles	(Romania) Adrian Ungur; 6–1, 6–0	(Croatia) Antonio Veić	(Italy) Alessandro Giannessi (Brazil) Guilherme Clezar	(Italy) Simone Bolelli (Spain) Albert Montañés (Serbia) Filip Krajinović (Serbia) Viktor Troicki
August 4	San Marino GO&FUN Open; City of San Marino, San Marino; Clay – €64,000+H – 32S/32Q/16D; Singles – Doubles	(Moldova) Radu Albot (Spain) Enrique López Pérez; 6–4, 6–1	(Croatia) Franko Škugor (Romania) Adrian Ungur	(Italy) Alessandro Giannessi (Brazil) Guilherme Clezar	(Italy) Simone Bolelli (Spain) Albert Montañés (Serbia) Filip Krajinović (Serbia) Viktor Troicki
August 4	Advantage Cars Prague Open; Prague, Czech Republic; Clay – €42,500 – 32S/32Q/16D; Singles – Doubles	(Argentina) Diego Sebastián Schwartzman; 6–4, 7–5	(Brazil) André Ghem	(Czech Republic) Jaroslav Pospíšil (Spain) Rubén Ramírez Hidalgo	(Belarus) Uladzimir Ignatik (Poland) Michał Przysiężny (Serbia) Miki Janković (Spain) Jordi Samper Montaña
August 4	Advantage Cars Prague Open; Prague, Czech Republic; Clay – €42,500 – 32S/32Q/16D; Singles – Doubles	(Croatia) Toni Androić (Russia) Andrey Kuznetsov; 7–5, 7–5	(Venezuela) Roberto Maytín (Mexico) Miguel Ángel Reyes-Varela	(Czech Republic) Jaroslav Pospíšil (Spain) Rubén Ramírez Hidalgo	(Belarus) Uladzimir Ignatik (Poland) Michał Przysiężny (Serbia) Miki Janković (Spain) Jordi Samper Montaña
August 11	Internazionali di Tennis del Friuli Venezia Giulia; Cordenons, Italy; Clay – €42,500+H – 32S/32Q/16D; Singles – Doubles	(Spain) Albert Montañés; 6–2, 6–4	(Italy) Potito Starace	(Italy) Paolo Lorenzi (Spain) Daniel Gimeno Traver	(Sweden) Elias Ymer (Italy) Filippo Volandri (Croatia) Franko Škugor (France) Guillaume Rufin
August 11	Internazionali di Tennis del Friuli Venezia Giulia; Cordenons, Italy; Clay – €42,500+H – 32S/32Q/16D; Singles – Doubles	(Italy) Potito Starace (Romania) Adrian Ungur; 6–2, 6–4	(Czech Republic) František Čermák (Czech Republic) Lukáš Dlouhý	(Italy) Paolo Lorenzi (Spain) Daniel Gimeno Traver	(Sweden) Elias Ymer (Italy) Filippo Volandri (Croatia) Franko Škugor (France) Guillaume Rufin
August 11	Maserati Challenger; Meerbusch, Germany; Clay – €35,000+H – 32S/31Q/16D; Singles – Doubles	(Slovakia) Jozef Kovalík; 6–1, 6–4	(Russia) Andrey Kuznetsov	(France) Tristan Lamasine (Germany) Peter Torebko	(Germany) Matthias Bachinger (Austria) Andreas Haider-Maurer (Chile) Hans Podlipnik (Belgium) Arthur De Greef
August 11	Maserati Challenger; Meerbusch, Germany; Clay – €35,000+H – 32S/31Q/16D; Singles – Doubles	(Germany) Matthias Bachinger (Germany) Dominik Meffert; 6–3, 3–6, [10–6]	(China) Gong Maoxin (Chinese Taipei) Peng Hsien-yin	(France) Tristan Lamasine (Germany) Peter Torebko	(Germany) Matthias Bachinger (Austria) Andreas Haider-Maurer (Chile) Hans Podlipnik (Belgium) Arthur De Greef
August 18	No tournaments scheduled.				
August 25	Chang-Sat Bangkok Open; Bangkok, Thailand; Hard – $50,000 – 32S/30Q/16D; Singles – Doubles	(South Korea) Chung Hyeon; 7–6^{(7–0)}, 6–4	(Australia) Jordan Thompson	(Japan) Go Soeda (Italy) Luca Vanni	(Japan) Yasutaka Uchiyama (Chinese Taipei) Huang Liang-chi (Chinese Taipei) Chen Ti (United Kingdom) Kyle Edmund
August 25	Chang-Sat Bangkok Open; Bangkok, Thailand; Hard – $50,000 – 32S/30Q/16D; Singles – Doubles	(Thailand) Pruchya Isaro (Thailand) Nuttanon Kadchapanan; 6–4, 6–4	(Chinese Taipei) Chen Ti (Chinese Taipei) Peng Hsien-yin	(Japan) Go Soeda (Italy) Luca Vanni	(Japan) Yasutaka Uchiyama (Chinese Taipei) Huang Liang-chi (Chinese Taipei) Chen Ti (United Kingdom) Kyle Edmund
August 25	Città di Como Challenger; Como, Italy; Clay – €35,000+H – 32S/28Q/16D; Singles – Doubles	(Serbia) Viktor Troicki; 6–3, 6–2	(Republic of Ireland) Louk Sorensen	(Estonia) Jürgen Zopp (Serbia) Ilija Bozoljac	(Argentina) Facundo Argüello (Italy) Potito Starace (Serbia) Boris Pašanski (Sweden) Christian Lindell
August 25	Città di Como Challenger; Como, Italy; Clay – €35,000+H – 32S/28Q/16D; Singles – Doubles	(Argentina) Guido Andreozzi (Argentina) Facundo Argüello; 6–2, 6–2	(Canada) Steven Diez (Spain) Enrique López Pérez	(Estonia) Jürgen Zopp (Serbia) Ilija Bozoljac	(Argentina) Facundo Argüello (Italy) Potito Starace (Serbia) Boris Pašanski (Sweden) Christian Lindell

=== September ===
Week of	Tournament	Champions	Runners-up	Semifinalists	Quarterfinalists
September 1	AON Open Challenger; Genoa, Italy; Clay – €85,000+H – 32S/32Q/16D; Singles – Doubles	(Spain) Albert Ramos; 6–1, 7–5	(Croatia) Mate Delić	(Hungary) Márton Fucsovics (Germany) Andreas Beck	(Slovenia) Aljaž Bedene (Australia) Jason Kubler (Italy) Marco Cecchinato (Serbia) Viktor Troicki
September 1	AON Open Challenger; Genoa, Italy; Clay – €85,000+H – 32S/32Q/16D; Singles – Doubles	(Italy) Daniele Bracciali (Italy) Potito Starace; 6–3, 6–4	(Germany) Frank Moser (Germany) Alexander Satschko	(Hungary) Márton Fucsovics (Germany) Andreas Beck	(Slovenia) Aljaž Bedene (Australia) Jason Kubler (Italy) Marco Cecchinato (Serbia) Viktor Troicki
September 1	Seguros Bolívar Open Medellín; Medellín, Colombia; Clay – $50,000+H – 32S/28Q/16D; Singles – Doubles	(United States) Austin Krajicek; 7–5, 6–3	(Brazil) João Souza	(Brazil) André Ghem (Argentina) Facundo Bagnis	(Colombia) Alejandro González (Colombia) Carlos Salamanca (Brazil) Guilherme Clezar (Chile) Gonzalo Lama
September 1	Seguros Bolívar Open Medellín; Medellín, Colombia; Clay – $50,000+H – 32S/28Q/16D; Singles – Doubles	(United States) Austin Krajicek (Mexico) César Ramírez; 6–3, 7–5	(Venezuela) Roberto Maytín (Argentina) Andrés Molteni	(Brazil) André Ghem (Argentina) Facundo Bagnis	(Colombia) Alejandro González (Colombia) Carlos Salamanca (Brazil) Guilherme Clezar (Chile) Gonzalo Lama
September 1	TEAN International; Alphen aan den Rijn, Netherlands; Clay – €42,500 – 32S/32Q/16D; Singles – Doubles	(Netherlands) Jesse Huta Galung; 6–3, 6–4	(Spain) Daniel Muñoz de la Nava	(France) Tristan Lamasine (Romania) Victor Hănescu	(Netherlands) Antal van der Duim (Spain) Daniel Gimeno Traver (Belgium) Kimmer Coppejans (Netherlands) Igor Sijsling
September 1	TEAN International; Alphen aan den Rijn, Netherlands; Clay – €42,500 – 32S/32Q/16D; Singles – Doubles	(Netherlands) Antal van der Duim (Netherlands) Boy Westerhof; 6–1, 6–3	(Spain) Rubén Ramírez Hidalgo (Italy) Matteo Viola	(France) Tristan Lamasine (Romania) Victor Hănescu	(Netherlands) Antal van der Duim (Spain) Daniel Gimeno Traver (Belgium) Kimmer Coppejans (Netherlands) Igor Sijsling
September 1	Shanghai Challenger; Shanghai, China; Hard – $50,000 – 32S/32Q/16D; Singles – Doubles	(Japan) Yoshihito Nishioka; 6–4, 6–7^{(5–7)}, 7–6^{(7–3)}	(India) Somdev Devvarman	(Italy) Thomas Fabbiano (Italy) Luca Vanni	(Japan) Go Soeda (Thailand) Danai Udomchoke (India) Yuki Bhambri (China) Wu Di
September 1	Shanghai Challenger; Shanghai, China; Hard – $50,000 – 32S/32Q/16D; Singles – Doubles	(India) Yuki Bhambri (India) Divij Sharan; 7–6^{(7–2)},6–7^{(4–7)}, [10–8]	(India) Somdev Devvarman (India) Sanam Singh	(Italy) Thomas Fabbiano (Italy) Luca Vanni	(Japan) Go Soeda (Thailand) Danai Udomchoke (India) Yuki Bhambri (China) Wu Di
September 1	Trophée des Alpilles; Saint-Rémy-de-Provence, France; Hard – €42,500 – 32S/26Q/16D; Singles – Doubles	(France) Nicolas Mahut; 6–7^{(3–7)}, 6–4, 6–3	(France) Vincent Millot	(France) Pierre-Hugues Herbert (Ukraine) Sergiy Stakhovsky	(Germany) Alexander Zverev (Slovakia) Norbert Gomboš (Ukraine) Denys Molchanov (France) Maxime Chazal
September 1	Trophée des Alpilles; Saint-Rémy-de-Provence, France; Hard – €42,500 – 32S/26Q/16D; Singles – Doubles	(France) Pierre-Hugues Herbert (Russia) Konstantin Kravchuk; 6–1, 7–6^{(7–3)}	(France) David Guez (France) Martin Vaïsse	(France) Pierre-Hugues Herbert (Ukraine) Sergiy Stakhovsky	(Germany) Alexander Zverev (Slovakia) Norbert Gomboš (Ukraine) Denys Molchanov (France) Maxime Chazal
September 1	BRD Brașov Challenger; Brașov, Romania; Clay – €35,000+H – 32S/32Q/16D; Singles – Doubles	(Austria) Andreas Haider-Maurer; 6–3, 6–2	(France) Guillaume Rufin	(Czech Republic) Jaroslav Pospíšil (Russia) Aslan Karatsev	(Romania) Petru-Alexandru Luncanu (Romania) Adrian Ungur (Slovakia) Adrian Sikora (Lithuania) Laurynas Grigelis
September 1	BRD Brașov Challenger; Brașov, Romania; Clay – €35,000+H – 32S/32Q/16D; Singles – Doubles	(Italy) Daniele Giorgini (Romania) Adrian Ungur; 4–6, 7–6^{(7–4)}, [10–1]	(Russia) Aslan Karatsev (Russia) Valery Rudnev	(Czech Republic) Jaroslav Pospíšil (Russia) Aslan Karatsev	(Romania) Petru-Alexandru Luncanu (Romania) Adrian Ungur (Slovakia) Adrian Sikora (Lithuania) Laurynas Grigelis
September 8	Pekao Szczecin Open; Szczecin, Poland; Clay – €106,500+H – 32S/31Q/16D; Singles – Doubles	(Germany) Dustin Brown; 6–4, 6–3	(Germany) Jan-Lennard Struff	(Argentina) Facundo Argüello (France) Lucas Pouille	(Italy) Potito Starace (Kazakhstan) Aleksandr Nedovyesov (Finland) Micke Kontinen (Poland) Kamil Majchrzak
September 8	Pekao Szczecin Open; Szczecin, Poland; Clay – €106,500+H – 32S/31Q/16D; Singles – Doubles	(Germany) Dustin Brown (Germany) Jan-Lennard Struff; 6–2, 6–4	(Poland) Tomasz Bednarek (Slovakia) Igor Zelenay	(Argentina) Facundo Argüello (France) Lucas Pouille	(Italy) Potito Starace (Kazakhstan) Aleksandr Nedovyesov (Finland) Micke Kontinen (Poland) Kamil Majchrzak
September 8	Banja Luka Challenger; Banja Luka, Bosnia and Herzegovina; Clay – €64,000+H – 32S/14Q/16D; Singles – Doubles	(Serbia) Viktor Troicki; 7–5, 4–6, 7–5	(Spain) Albert Ramos	(Slovenia) Blaž Rola (Austria) Andreas Haider-Maurer	(Belgium) Kimmer Coppejans (Slovenia) Aljaž Bedene (Czech Republic) Jaroslav Pospíšil (France) Gleb Sakharov
September 8	Banja Luka Challenger; Banja Luka, Bosnia and Herzegovina; Clay – €64,000+H – 32S/14Q/16D; Singles – Doubles	(Croatia) Dino Marcan (Croatia) Antonio Šančić; 7–5, 6–4	(Czech Republic) Jaroslav Pospíšil (Slovakia) Adrian Sikora	(Slovenia) Blaž Rola (Austria) Andreas Haider-Maurer	(Belgium) Kimmer Coppejans (Slovenia) Aljaž Bedene (Czech Republic) Jaroslav Pospíšil (France) Gleb Sakharov
September 8	Amex-Istanbul Challenger; Istanbul, Turkey; Hard – $75,000 – 32S/19Q/16D; Singles – Doubles	(France) Adrian Mannarino; 6–0, 2–0 retired	(Japan) Tatsuma Ito	(United Kingdom) James Ward (Germany) Philipp Petzschner	(Germany) Tobias Kamke (Republic of Ireland) Louk Sorensen (Chinese Taipei) Jimmy Wang (Turkey) Marsel İlhan
September 8	Amex-Istanbul Challenger; Istanbul, Turkey; Hard – $75,000 – 32S/19Q/16D; Singles – Doubles	(United Kingdom) Colin Fleming (United Kingdom) Jonathan Marray; 6–4, 2–6, [10–8]	(Australia) Jordan Kerr (France) Fabrice Martin	(United Kingdom) James Ward (Germany) Philipp Petzschner	(Germany) Tobias Kamke (Republic of Ireland) Louk Sorensen (Chinese Taipei) Jimmy Wang (Turkey) Marsel İlhan
September 8	Copa Sevilla; Sevilla, Spain; Clay – €42,500+H – 32S/20Q/16D; Singles – Doubles	(Spain) Pablo Carreño; 6–4, 6–1	(Japan) Taro Daniel	(Spain) Íñigo Cervantes Huegun (Netherlands) Boy Westerhof	(Spain) Adrián Menéndez Maceiras (Spain) David Vega Hernández (Spain) Oriol Roca Batalla (Spain) Daniel Muñoz de la Nava
September 8	Copa Sevilla; Sevilla, Spain; Clay – €42,500+H – 32S/20Q/16D; Singles – Doubles	(Netherlands) Antal van der Duim (Netherlands) Boy Westerhof; 7–6^{(7–3)}, 6–4	(Republic of Ireland) James Cluskey (Netherlands) Jesse Huta Galung	(Spain) Íñigo Cervantes Huegun (Netherlands) Boy Westerhof	(Spain) Adrián Menéndez Maceiras (Spain) David Vega Hernández (Spain) Oriol Roca Batalla (Spain) Daniel Muñoz de la Nava
September 8	Challenger Pulcra Lachiter Biella; Biella, Italy; Clay – €42,500 – 32S/16Q/16D; Singles – Doubles	(Italy) Matteo Viola; 7–5, 6–1	(Italy) Filippo Volandri	(Monaco) Benjamin Balleret (Italy) Marco Cecchinato	(Switzerland) Henri Laaksonen (Italy) Andrea Arnaboldi (Czech Republic) Jan Hájek (Australia) Jason Kubler
September 8	Challenger Pulcra Lachiter Biella; Biella, Italy; Clay – €42,500 – 32S/16Q/16D; Singles – Doubles	(Italy) Marco Cecchinato (Italy) Matteo Viola; 7–5, 6–0	(Germany) Frank Moser (Germany) Alexander Satschko	(Monaco) Benjamin Balleret (Italy) Marco Cecchinato	(Switzerland) Henri Laaksonen (Italy) Andrea Arnaboldi (Czech Republic) Jan Hájek (Australia) Jason Kubler
September 15	Türk Telecom İzmir Cup; İzmir, Turkey; Hard – €106,500 – 32S/25Q/16D; Singles – Doubles	(Croatia) Borna Ćorić; 6–1, 6–7^{(7–9)}, 6–4	(Tunisia) Malek Jaziri	(Russia) Mikhail Ledovskikh (Turkey) Marsel İlhan	(Ukraine) Illya Marchenko (Bosnia and Herzegovina) Mirza Bašić (Belarus) Egor Gerasimov (Bosnia and Herzegovina) Tomislav Brkić
September 15	Türk Telecom İzmir Cup; İzmir, Turkey; Hard – €106,500 – 32S/25Q/16D; Singles – Doubles	(United Kingdom) Ken Skupski (United Kingdom) Neal Skupski; 6–1, 6–4	(Tunisia) Malek Jaziri (Russia) Alexander Kudryavtsev	(Russia) Mikhail Ledovskikh (Turkey) Marsel İlhan	(Ukraine) Illya Marchenko (Bosnia and Herzegovina) Mirza Bašić (Belarus) Egor Gerasimov (Bosnia and Herzegovina) Tomislav Brkić
September 15	Arimex Challenger Trophy; Trnava, Slovakia; Clay – €42,500+H – 32S/32Q/16D; Singles – Doubles	(Austria) Andreas Haider-Maurer; 2–6, 6–3, 7–6^{(7–4)}	(Croatia) Antonio Veić	(Moldova) Radu Albot (Hungary) Márton Fucsovics	(Italy) Marco Cecchinato (Czech Republic) Jan Hájek (Spain) Pere Riba (Slovenia) Blaž Rola
September 15	Arimex Challenger Trophy; Trnava, Slovakia; Clay – €42,500+H – 32S/32Q/16D; Singles – Doubles	(Czech Republic) Roman Jebavý (Czech Republic) Jaroslav Pospíšil; 6–4, 6–2	(Netherlands) Stephan Fransen (Netherlands) Robin Haase	(Moldova) Radu Albot (Hungary) Márton Fucsovics	(Italy) Marco Cecchinato (Czech Republic) Jan Hájek (Spain) Pere Riba (Slovenia) Blaž Rola
September 15	Morocco Tennis Tour – Meknes; Meknes, Morocco; Clay – €42,500 – 32S/17Q/16D; Singles – Doubles	(Belgium) Kimmer Coppejans; 4–6, 6–2, 6–2	(France) Lucas Pouille	(Spain) Roberto Carballés Baena (Italy) Matteo Viola	(Spain) Pablo Carreño (France) Julien Obry (Egypt) Mohamed Safwat (Belgium) Yannik Reuter
September 15	Morocco Tennis Tour – Meknes; Meknes, Morocco; Clay – €42,500 – 32S/17Q/16D; Singles – Doubles	(Chile) Hans Podlipnik Castillo (Italy) Stefano Travaglia; 6–2, 6–7^{(4–7)}, [10–7]	(Spain) Gerard Granollers (Spain) Jordi Samper Montaña	(Spain) Roberto Carballés Baena (Italy) Matteo Viola	(Spain) Pablo Carreño (France) Julien Obry (Egypt) Mohamed Safwat (Belgium) Yannik Reuter
September 15	Campeonato Internacional de Tênis de Campinas; Campinas, Brazil; Clay – $40,000+H – 32S/32Q/16D; Singles – Doubles	(Argentina) Diego Sebastián Schwartzman; 4–6, 6–4, 7–5	(Brazil) André Ghem	(Argentina) Guido Andreozzi (France) Gianni Mina	(Brazil) Guilherme Clezar (Brazil) José Pereira (Slovakia) Ivo Klec (Germany) Richard Becker
September 15	Campeonato Internacional de Tênis de Campinas; Campinas, Brazil; Clay – $40,000+H – 32S/32Q/16D; Singles – Doubles	(Argentina) Facundo Bagnis (Argentina) Diego Sebastián Schwartzman; 7–6^{(7–4)}, 5–7, [10–7]	(Brazil) André Ghem (Brazil) Fabrício Neis	(Argentina) Guido Andreozzi (France) Gianni Mina	(Brazil) Guilherme Clezar (Brazil) José Pereira (Slovakia) Ivo Klec (Germany) Richard Becker
September 15	Quito Challenger; Quito, Ecuador; Clay – $40,000+H – 32S/16Q/16D; Singles – Doubles	(Argentina) Horacio Zeballos; 6–4, 7–6^{(11–9)}	(Chile) Nicolás Jarry	(Argentina) Andrés Molteni (Brazil) João Souza	(Ecuador) Gonzalo Escobar (Bolivia) Hugo Dellien (Argentina) Juan Ignacio Londero (United States) Chase Buchanan
September 15	Quito Challenger; Quito, Ecuador; Clay – $40,000+H – 32S/16Q/16D; Singles – Doubles	(Brazil) Marcelo Demoliner (Brazil) João Souza; 6–4, 6–4	(Peru) Duilio Beretta (Uruguay) Martín Cuevas	(Argentina) Andrés Molteni (Brazil) João Souza	(Ecuador) Gonzalo Escobar (Bolivia) Hugo Dellien (Argentina) Juan Ignacio Londero (United States) Chase Buchanan
September 22	Open d'Orléans; Orléans, France; Hard (i) – €106,500+H – 32S/28Q/16D; Singles – Doubles	(Ukraine) Sergiy Stakhovsky; 6–2, 7–5	(Brazil) Thomaz Bellucci	(Czech Republic) Jiří Veselý (France) Paul-Henri Mathieu	(Germany) Tim Pütz (Germany) Andreas Beck (Austria) Martin Fischer (Netherlands) Igor Sijsling
September 22	Open d'Orléans; Orléans, France; Hard (i) – €106,500+H – 32S/28Q/16D; Singles – Doubles	(Brazil) Thomaz Bellucci (Brazil) André Sá; 5–7, 6–4, [10–8]	(United States) James Cerretani (Sweden) Andreas Siljeström	(Czech Republic) Jiří Veselý (France) Paul-Henri Mathieu	(Germany) Tim Pütz (Germany) Andreas Beck (Austria) Martin Fischer (Netherlands) Igor Sijsling
September 22	Napa Valley Challenger; Napa, United States; Hard – $50,000 – 32S/32Q/16D; Singles – Doubles	(United States) Sam Querrey; 6–3, 6–1	(United States) Tim Smyczek	(Australia) Alex Bolt (United States) Jared Donaldson	(United States) Michael Russell (Australia) John Millman (Germany) Julian Lenz (United Kingdom) Liam Broady
September 22	Napa Valley Challenger; Napa, United States; Hard – $50,000 – 32S/32Q/16D; Singles – Doubles	(Canada) Peter Polansky (Canada) Adil Shamasdin; 7–6^{(7–0)}, 6–1	(United States) Bradley Klahn (United States) Tim Smyczek	(Australia) Alex Bolt (United States) Jared Donaldson	(United States) Michael Russell (Australia) John Millman (Germany) Julian Lenz (United Kingdom) Liam Broady
September 22	Sibiu Open; Sibiu, Romania; Clay – €42,500+H – 32S/24Q/16D; Singles – Doubles	(Australia) Jason Kubler; 6–4, 6–1	(Moldova) Radu Albot	(Spain) Pere Riba (Italy) Potito Starace	(Romania) Victor Crivoi (Italy) Flavio Cipolla (Bosnia and Herzegovina) Tomislav Brkić (Slovakia) Jozef Kovalík
September 22	Sibiu Open; Sibiu, Romania; Clay – €42,500+H – 32S/24Q/16D; Singles – Doubles	(Italy) Potito Starace (Romania) Adrian Ungur; 7–5, 6–2	(Romania) Alexandru-Daniel Carpen (Romania) Marius Copil	(Spain) Pere Riba (Italy) Potito Starace	(Romania) Victor Crivoi (Italy) Flavio Cipolla (Bosnia and Herzegovina) Tomislav Brkić (Slovakia) Jozef Kovalík
September 22	Morocco Tennis Tour – Kenitra; Kenitra, Morocco; Clay – €42,500 – 32S/25Q/16D; Singles – Doubles	(Spain) Daniel Gimeno Traver; 6–3, 6–4	(Spain) Albert Ramos	(Spain) Roberto Carballés Baena (Bosnia and Herzegovina) Damir Džumhur	(France) Lucas Pouille (Slovenia) Aljaž Bedene (Italy) Stefano Travaglia (Portugal) Rui Machado
September 22	Morocco Tennis Tour – Kenitra; Kenitra, Morocco; Clay – €42,500 – 32S/25Q/16D; Singles – Doubles	(Croatia) Dino Marcan (Croatia) Antonio Šančić; 6–1, 7–6^{(7–3)}	(Spain) Gerard Granollers (Spain) Jordi Samper Montaña	(Spain) Roberto Carballés Baena (Bosnia and Herzegovina) Damir Džumhur	(France) Lucas Pouille (Slovenia) Aljaž Bedene (Italy) Stefano Travaglia (Portugal) Rui Machado
September 22	Seguros Bolívar Open Pereira; Pereira, Colombia; Clay – $40,000+H – 32S/24Q/16D; Singles – Doubles	(Dominican Republic) Víctor Estrella Burgos; 7–6^{(7–5)}, 3–6, 7–6^{(8–6)}	(Brazil) João Souza	(Argentina) Guido Pella (Argentina) Agustín Velotti	(Spain) Daniel Muñoz de la Nava (Croatia) Toni Androić (Argentina) Andrés Molteni (Sweden) Christian Lindell
September 22	Seguros Bolívar Open Pereira; Pereira, Colombia; Clay – $40,000+H – 32S/24Q/16D; Singles – Doubles	(Colombia) Nicolás Barrientos (Colombia) Eduardo Struvay; 3–6, 6–3, [11–9]	(Argentina) Guido Pella (Argentina) Horacio Zeballos	(Argentina) Guido Pella (Argentina) Agustín Velotti	(Spain) Daniel Muñoz de la Nava (Croatia) Toni Androić (Argentina) Andrés Molteni (Sweden) Christian Lindell
September 22	Aberto de Tênis do Rio Grande do Sul; Porto Alegre, Brazil; Clay – $40,000+H – 32S/29Q/16D; Singles – Doubles	(Argentina) Carlos Berlocq; 6–4, 4–6, 6–0	(Argentina) Diego Sebastián Schwartzman	(France) Gianni Mina (Argentina) Guido Andreozzi	(Portugal) Gastão Elias (Brazil) Guilherme Clezar (Argentina) Facundo Argüello (Argentina) Martín Alund
September 22	Aberto de Tênis do Rio Grande do Sul; Porto Alegre, Brazil; Clay – $40,000+H – 32S/29Q/16D; Singles – Doubles	(Argentina) Guido Andreozzi (Argentina) Guillermo Durán; 6–3, 6–3	(Argentina) Facundo Bagnis (Argentina) Diego Sebastián Schwartzman	(France) Gianni Mina (Argentina) Guido Andreozzi	(Portugal) Gastão Elias (Brazil) Guilherme Clezar (Argentina) Facundo Argüello (Argentina) Martín Alund
September 29	Ethias Trophy; Mons, Belgium; Hard (i) – €106,500+H – 32S/27Q/16D; Singles – Doubles	(Belgium) David Goffin; 6–3, 6–3	(Belgium) Steve Darcis	(Turkey) Marsel İlhan (Czech Republic) Jiří Veselý	(Germany) Alexander Zverev (Germany) Tobias Kamke (Belgium) Ruben Bemelmans (Austria) Gerald Melzer
September 29	Ethias Trophy; Mons, Belgium; Hard (i) – €106,500+H – 32S/27Q/16D; Singles – Doubles	(France) Marc Gicquel (France) Nicolas Mahut; 6–3, 6–4	(Germany) Andre Begemann (Austria) Julian Knowle	(Turkey) Marsel İlhan (Czech Republic) Jiří Veselý	(Germany) Alexander Zverev (Germany) Tobias Kamke (Belgium) Ruben Bemelmans (Austria) Gerald Melzer
September 29	Sacramento Challenger; Sacramento, United States; Hard – $100,000– 32S/32Q/16D; Singles – Doubles	(United States) Sam Querrey; 6–3, 6–4	(United States) Stefan Kozlov	(Australia) John Millman (United States) Tim Smyczek	(United States) Jared Donaldson (United States) Bjorn Fratangelo (United States) Rhyne Williams (United States) Denis Kudla
September 29	Sacramento Challenger; Sacramento, United States; Hard – $100,000– 32S/32Q/16D; Singles – Doubles	(Australia) Adam Hubble (Australia) John-Patrick Smith; 6–3, 6–2	(Canada) Peter Polansky (Canada) Adil Shamasdin	(Australia) John Millman (United States) Tim Smyczek	(United States) Jared Donaldson (United States) Bjorn Fratangelo (United States) Rhyne Williams (United States) Denis Kudla
September 29	Claro Open Cali; Cali, Colombia; Clay – $40,000+H – 32S/23Q/16D; Singles – Doubles	(Italy) Paolo Lorenzi; 4–6, 6–3, 6–3	(Dominican Republic) Víctor Estrella Burgos	(Argentina) Guido Andreozzi (Brazil) João Souza	(Argentina) Facundo Bagnis (Chile) Nicolás Jarry (Sweden) Christian Lindell (Colombia) Alejandro González
September 29	Claro Open Cali; Cali, Colombia; Clay – $40,000+H – 32S/23Q/16D; Singles – Doubles	(Argentina) Guido Andreozzi (Argentina) Guillermo Durán; 6–3, 6–4	(Colombia) Alejandro González (Mexico) César Ramírez	(Argentina) Guido Andreozzi (Brazil) João Souza	(Argentina) Facundo Bagnis (Chile) Nicolás Jarry (Sweden) Christian Lindell (Colombia) Alejandro González

=== October ===
Week of	Tournament	Champions	Runners-up	Semifinalists	Quarterfinalists
October 6	Tashkent Challenger; Tashkent, Uzbekistan; Hard – $125,000+H – 32S/24Q/16D; Singles – Doubles	(Slovakia) Lukáš Lacko; 6–2, 6–3	(Ukraine) Sergiy Stakhovsky	(Croatia) Borna Ćorić (France) Adrian Mannarino	(Serbia) Dušan Lajović (Kazakhstan) Aleksandr Nedovyesov (Russia) Evgeny Donskoy (Russia) Anton Zaitcev
October 6	Tashkent Challenger; Tashkent, Uzbekistan; Hard – $125,000+H – 32S/24Q/16D; Singles – Doubles	(Slovakia) Lukáš Lacko (Croatia) Ante Pavić; 6–3, 3–6, [13–11]	(Germany) Frank Moser (Germany) Alexander Satschko	(Croatia) Borna Ćorić (France) Adrian Mannarino	(Serbia) Dušan Lajović (Kazakhstan) Aleksandr Nedovyesov (Russia) Evgeny Donskoy (Russia) Anton Zaitcev
October 6	Tiburon Challenger; Tiburon, United States; Hard – $100,000 – 32S/32Q/16D; Singles – Doubles	(United States) Sam Querrey; 6–4, 6–2	(Australia) John Millman	(Australia) Matt Reid (Germany) Nils Langer	(Republic of Ireland) James McGee (United States) Bjorn Fratangelo (United States) Marcos Giron (United States) Tim Smyczek
October 6	Tiburon Challenger; Tiburon, United States; Hard – $100,000 – 32S/32Q/16D; Singles – Doubles	(United States) Bradley Klahn (Canada) Adil Shamasdin; 7–5, 6–2	(Australia) Carsten Ball (Australia) Matt Reid	(Australia) Matt Reid (Germany) Nils Langer	(Republic of Ireland) James McGee (United States) Bjorn Fratangelo (United States) Marcos Giron (United States) Tim Smyczek
October 6	Open de Rennes; Rennes, France; Hard (i) – €85,000+H – 32S/28Q/16D; Singles – Doubles	(Belgium) Steve Darcis; 6–2, 6–4	(France) Nicolas Mahut	(France) Enzo Couacaud (Turkey) Marsel İlhan	(Netherlands) Robin Haase (France) Marc Gicquel (Germany) Dustin Brown (Austria) Andreas Haider-Maurer
October 6	Open de Rennes; Rennes, France; Hard (i) – €85,000+H – 32S/28Q/16D; Singles – Doubles	(Germany) Tobias Kamke (Germany) Philipp Marx; 3–6, 6–2, [10–3]	(Czech Republic) František Čermák (Israel) Jonathan Erlich	(France) Enzo Couacaud (Turkey) Marsel İlhan	(Netherlands) Robin Haase (France) Marc Gicquel (Germany) Dustin Brown (Austria) Andreas Haider-Maurer
October 13	Indore Open ATP Challenger; Indore, India; Hard – $50,000 – 32S/16Q/16D; Singles – Doubles	(India) Saketh Myneni; 6–3, 6–7^{(4–7)}, 6–3	(Kazakhstan) Aleksandr Nedovyesov	(Italy) Stefano Travaglia (India) Ramkumar Ramanathan	(Spain) Adrián Menéndez Maceiras (Chinese Taipei) Huang Liang-chi (Chinese Taipei) Chen Ti (India) Sanam Singh
October 13	Indore Open ATP Challenger; Indore, India; Hard – $50,000 – 32S/16Q/16D; Singles – Doubles	(Spain) Adrián Menéndez Maceiras (Kazakhstan) Aleksandr Nedovyesov; 2–6, 6–4, [10–3]	(India) Yuki Bhambri (India) Divij Sharan	(Italy) Stefano Travaglia (India) Ramkumar Ramanathan	(Spain) Adrián Menéndez Maceiras (Chinese Taipei) Huang Liang-chi (Chinese Taipei) Chen Ti (India) Sanam Singh
October 13	Copa San Juan Gobierno; San Juan, Argentina; Clay – $40,000+H – 32S/25Q/16D; Singles – Doubles	(Argentina) Diego Sebastián Schwartzman; 7–6^{(7–5)}, 6–3	(Brazil) João Souza	(Argentina) Facundo Argüello (Colombia) Alejandro González	(Argentina) Guido Andreozzi (Brazil) André Ghem (Argentina) Facundo Bagnis (Argentina) Martín Alund
October 13	Copa San Juan Gobierno; San Juan, Argentina; Clay – $40,000+H – 32S/25Q/16D; Singles – Doubles	(Argentina) Martín Alund (Argentina) Facundo Bagnis; 4–6, 6–3, [10–7]	(Argentina) Diego Sebastián Schwartzman (Argentina) Horacio Zeballos	(Argentina) Facundo Argüello (Colombia) Alejandro González	(Argentina) Guido Andreozzi (Brazil) André Ghem (Argentina) Facundo Bagnis (Argentina) Martín Alund
October 20	KPIT MSLTA Challenger; Pune, India; Hard – $50,000+H – 32S/26Q/16D; Singles – Doubles	(Japan) Yūichi Sugita; 6–7^{(1–7)}, 6–4, 6-4	(Spain) Adrián Menéndez Maceiras	(India) Saketh Myneni (Belgium) Kimmer Coppejans	(Kazakhstan) Aleksandr Nedovyesov (India) Yuki Bhambri (Czech Republic) Adam Pavlásek (Russia) Alexander Kudryavtsev
October 20	KPIT MSLTA Challenger; Pune, India; Hard – $50,000+H – 32S/26Q/16D; Singles – Doubles	(India) Saketh Myneni (India) Sanam Singh; 6–3, 6–2	(Thailand) Sanchai Ratiwatana (Thailand) Sonchat Ratiwatana	(India) Saketh Myneni (Belgium) Kimmer Coppejans	(Kazakhstan) Aleksandr Nedovyesov (India) Yuki Bhambri (Czech Republic) Adam Pavlásek (Russia) Alexander Kudryavtsev
October 20	Copa Gobierno de Córdoba; Córdoba, Argentina; Clay – $40,000+H – 32S/32Q/16D; Singles – Doubles	(Colombia) Alejandro González; 7–5, 1–6, 6–3	(Argentina) Máximo González	(Argentina) Pedro Cachin (Argentina) Facundo Bagnis	(Argentina) Marco Trungelliti (Argentina) Facundo Argüello (Chile) Hans Podlipnik (Brazil) André Ghem
October 20	Copa Gobierno de Córdoba; Córdoba, Argentina; Clay – $40,000+H – 32S/32Q/16D; Singles – Doubles	(Brazil) Marcelo Demoliner (Chile) Nicolás Jarry; 6–3, 7–5	(Bolivia) Hugo Dellien (Argentina) Juan Ignacio Londero	(Argentina) Pedro Cachin (Argentina) Facundo Bagnis	(Argentina) Marco Trungelliti (Argentina) Facundo Argüello (Chile) Hans Podlipnik (Brazil) André Ghem
October 27	Geneva Open Challenger; Geneva, Switzerland; Hard (i) – €64,000+H – 32S/31Q/16D; Singles – Doubles	(Cyprus) Marcos Baghdatis; 6–1, 4–6, 6–3	(Poland) Michał Przysiężny	(Moldova) Radu Albot (Italy) Simone Bolelli	(Czech Republic) Jiří Veselý (Bosnia and Herzegovina) Damir Džumhur (Romania) Victor Hănescu (Belgium) Steve Darcis
October 27	Geneva Open Challenger; Geneva, Switzerland; Hard (i) – €64,000+H – 32S/31Q/16D; Singles – Doubles	(Sweden) Johan Brunström (United States) Nicholas Monroe; 5–7, 7–5, [10–6]	(Austria) Oliver Marach (Austria) Philipp Oswald	(Moldova) Radu Albot (Italy) Simone Bolelli	(Czech Republic) Jiří Veselý (Bosnia and Herzegovina) Damir Džumhur (Romania) Victor Hănescu (Belgium) Steve Darcis
October 27	Charlottesville Men's Pro Challenger; Charlottesville, United States; Hard (i) – €50,000 – 32S/32Q/16D; Singles – Doubles	(Australia) James Duckworth; 5–7, 6–3, 6–2	(United Kingdom) Liam Broady	(United States) Alex Kuznetsov (United States) Denis Kudla	(France) Laurent Lokoli (Japan) Taro Daniel (United States) Tennys Sandgren (United States) Ryan Harrison
October 27	Charlottesville Men's Pro Challenger; Charlottesville, United States; Hard (i) – €50,000 – 32S/32Q/16D; Singles – Doubles	(Philippines) Treat Conrad Huey (Denmark) Frederik Nielsen; 3–6, 6–3, [10–2]	(United Kingdom) Lewis Burton (United Kingdom) Marcus Willis	(United States) Alex Kuznetsov (United States) Denis Kudla	(France) Laurent Lokoli (Japan) Taro Daniel (United States) Tennys Sandgren (United States) Ryan Harrison
October 27	Latrobe City Traralgon ATP Challenger 1 Traralgon, Australia; Hard – $50,000 – 32S/32Q/16D; Singles – Doubles	(United States) Bradley Klahn; 7–6^{(7–5)}, 6–1	(United States) Jarmere Jenkins	(Japan) Hiroki Moriya (Australia) John-Patrick Smith	(Australia) Thanasi Kokkinakis (Australia) Benjamin Mitchell (Australia) Luke Saville (Australia) Omar Jasika
October 27	Latrobe City Traralgon ATP Challenger 1 Traralgon, Australia; Hard – $50,000 – 32S/32Q/16D; Singles – Doubles	(United Kingdom) Brydan Klein (Australia) Dane Propoggia; 6–1, 1–6, [10–3]	(United States) Jarmere Jenkins (United States) Mitchell Krueger	(Japan) Hiroki Moriya (Australia) John-Patrick Smith	(Australia) Thanasi Kokkinakis (Australia) Benjamin Mitchell (Australia) Luke Saville (Australia) Omar Jasika
October 27	Bauer Watertechnology Cup; Eckental, Germany; Carpet (i) – €35,000+H – 32S/32Q/16D; Singles – Doubles	(Belgium) Ruben Bemelmans; 7–6^{(7–3)}, 6–3	(Germany) Tim Pütz	(Belgium) Niels Desein (Bosnia and Herzegovina) Mirza Bašić	(Italy) Andrea Arnaboldi (Russia) Evgeny Donskoy (Russia) Denis Matsukevich (Russia) Konstantin Kravchuk
October 27	Bauer Watertechnology Cup; Eckental, Germany; Carpet (i) – €35,000+H – 32S/32Q/16D; Singles – Doubles	(Belgium) Ruben Bemelmans (Belgium) Niels Desein; 6–3, 4–6, [10–8]	(Germany) Andreas Beck (Germany) Philipp Petzschner	(Belgium) Niels Desein (Bosnia and Herzegovina) Mirza Bašić	(Italy) Andrea Arnaboldi (Russia) Evgeny Donskoy (Russia) Denis Matsukevich (Russia) Konstantin Kravchuk
October 27	Open de la Réunion; Saint-Denis, Réunion Island; Hard – €35,000+H – 32S/32Q/16D; Singles – Doubles	(Netherlands) Robin Haase; 3–6, 6–1, 7–5	(France) Florent Serra	(United Kingdom) James Ward (Lithuania) Ričardas Berankis	(Belgium) Julien Cagnina (United States) Austin Krajicek (Spain) Pere Riba (France) Grégoire Barrère
October 27	Open de la Réunion; Saint-Denis, Réunion Island; Hard – €35,000+H – 32S/32Q/16D; Singles – Doubles	(Netherlands) Robin Haase (Croatia) Mate Pavić; 7–5, 4–6, [10–7]	(France) Jonathan Eysseric (France) Fabrice Martin	(United Kingdom) James Ward (Lithuania) Ričardas Berankis	(Belgium) Julien Cagnina (United States) Austin Krajicek (Spain) Pere Riba (France) Grégoire Barrère

=== November ===
Week of	Tournament	Champions	Runners-up	Semifinalists	Quarterfinalists
November 3	Slovak Open; Bratislava, Slovakia; Hard (i) – €85,000+H – 32S/30Q/16D; Singles – Doubles	(Germany) Peter Gojowczyk; 7–6^{(7–2)}, 6–3	(Uzbekistan) Farrukh Dustov	(Netherlands) Igor Sijsling (Kazakhstan) Aleksandr Nedovyesov	(Slovakia) Norbert Gomboš (Chinese Taipei) Jimmy Wang (Ukraine) Illya Marchenko (Slovakia) Lukáš Lacko
November 3	Slovak Open; Bratislava, Slovakia; Hard (i) – €85,000+H – 32S/30Q/16D; Singles – Doubles	(United Kingdom) Ken Skupski (United Kingdom) Neal Skupski; 6–3, 7–6^{(7–3)}	(Slovakia) Norbert Gomboš (Czech Republic) Adam Pavlásek	(Netherlands) Igor Sijsling (Kazakhstan) Aleksandr Nedovyesov	(Slovakia) Norbert Gomboš (Chinese Taipei) Jimmy Wang (Ukraine) Illya Marchenko (Slovakia) Lukáš Lacko
November 3	Internationaux de Tennis de Vendée; Mouilleron-le-Captif, France; Hard (i) – €64,000+H – 32S/30Q/16D; Singles – Doubles	(France) Pierre-Hugues Herbert; 6–2, 6–3	(Turkey) Marsel İlhan	(Romania) Victor Hănescu (Germany) Tobias Kamke	(Croatia) Borna Ćorić (France) Vincent Millot (Lithuania) Ričardas Berankis (France) Lucas Pouille
November 3	Internationaux de Tennis de Vendée; Mouilleron-le-Captif, France; Hard (i) – €64,000+H – 32S/30Q/16D; Singles – Doubles	(France) Pierre-Hugues Herbert (France) Nicolas Mahut; 6–3, 6–4	(Germany) Tobias Kamke (Germany) Philipp Marx	(Romania) Victor Hănescu (Germany) Tobias Kamke	(Croatia) Borna Ćorić (France) Vincent Millot (Lithuania) Ričardas Berankis (France) Lucas Pouille
November 3	Sparkassen ATP Challenger; Ortisei, Italy; Hard (i) – €64,000 – 32S/32Q/16D; Singles – Doubles	(Italy) Andreas Seppi; 6–4, 6–3	(Germany) Matthias Bachinger	(Czech Republic) Jan Hernych (Germany) Dustin Brown	(Germany) Nils Langer (Russia) Aslan Karatsev (United States) Austin Krajicek (Bosnia and Herzegovina) Mirza Bašić
November 3	Sparkassen ATP Challenger; Ortisei, Italy; Hard (i) – €64,000 – 32S/32Q/16D; Singles – Doubles	(Belarus) Sergey Betov (Belarus) Aliaksandr Bury; 6–4, 5–7, [10–6]	(Republic of Ireland) James Cluskey (United States) Austin Krajicek	(Czech Republic) Jan Hernych (Germany) Dustin Brown	(Germany) Nils Langer (Russia) Aslan Karatsev (United States) Austin Krajicek (Bosnia and Herzegovina) Mirza Bašić
November 3	Knoxville Challenger; Knoxville, United States; Hard (i) – $50,000 – 32S/32Q/16D; Singles – Doubles	(France) Adrian Mannarino; 3–6, 7–6^{(8–6)}, 6–4	(Australia) Sam Groth	(United States) Tim Smyczek (United Kingdom) Liam Broady	(Tunisia) Malek Jaziri (Portugal) Gastão Elias (United Kingdom) Marcus Willis (United States) Denis Kudla
November 3	Knoxville Challenger; Knoxville, United States; Hard (i) – $50,000 – 32S/32Q/16D; Singles – Doubles	(Latvia) Miķelis Lībietis (United States) Hunter Reese; 6–3, 6–4	(Portugal) Gastão Elias (United Kingdom) Sean Thornley	(United States) Tim Smyczek (United Kingdom) Liam Broady	(Tunisia) Malek Jaziri (Portugal) Gastão Elias (United Kingdom) Marcus Willis (United States) Denis Kudla
November 3	Latrobe City Traralgon ATP Challenger 2 Traralgon, Australia; Hard – $50,000 – 32S/32Q/16D; Singles – Doubles	(Australia) John Millman; 6–4, 6–1	(United Kingdom) James Ward	(Australia) Luke Saville (Australia) Benjamin Mitchell	(New Zealand) Jose Statham (United Kingdom) Kyle Edmund (Australia) John-Patrick Smith (Australia) Thanasi Kokkinakis
November 3	Latrobe City Traralgon ATP Challenger 2 Traralgon, Australia; Hard – $50,000 – 32S/32Q/16D; Singles – Doubles	(United Kingdom) Brydan Klein (Australia) Dane Propoggia; 7–6^{(8–6)}, 3–6, [10–6]	(New Zealand) Marcus Daniell (New Zealand) Artem Sitak	(Australia) Luke Saville (Australia) Benjamin Mitchell	(New Zealand) Jose Statham (United Kingdom) Kyle Edmund (Australia) John-Patrick Smith (Australia) Thanasi Kokkinakis
November 10	Trofeo Città di Brescia; Brescia, Italy; Carpet (i) – €42,500+H – 32S/32Q/16D; Singles – Doubles	(Ukraine) Illya Marchenko; 6–4, 5–7, 6–2	(Uzbekistan) Farrukh Dustov	(Germany) Michael Berrer (Germany) Dustin Brown	(Czech Republic) Jan Hernych (Russia) Denis Matsukevich (United States) Austin Krajicek (Serbia) Viktor Troicki
November 10	Trofeo Città di Brescia; Brescia, Italy; Carpet (i) – €42,500+H – 32S/32Q/16D; Singles – Doubles	(Ukraine) Illya Marchenko (Ukraine) Denys Molchanov; 7–6^{(7–4)}, 6–3	(Czech Republic) Roman Jebavý (Poland) Błażej Koniusz	(Germany) Michael Berrer (Germany) Dustin Brown	(Czech Republic) Jan Hernych (Russia) Denis Matsukevich (United States) Austin Krajicek (Serbia) Viktor Troicki
November 10	Challenger Ciudad de Guayaquil; Guayaquil, Ecuador; Clay – $50,000+H – 32S/24Q/16D; Singles – Doubles	(Uruguay) Pablo Cuevas; Walkover	(Italy) Paolo Lorenzi	(Argentina) Guido Pella (Argentina) Renzo Olivo	(Argentina) Facundo Argüello (Argentina) Diego Schwartzman (Argentina) Guido Andreozzi (Spain) Pere Riba
November 10	Challenger Ciudad de Guayaquil; Guayaquil, Ecuador; Clay – $50,000+H – 32S/24Q/16D; Singles – Doubles	(Argentina) Máximo González (Argentina) Guido Pella; 2–6, 7–6^{(7–5)}, [10–5]	(Spain) Pere Riba (Spain) Jordi Samper Montaña	(Argentina) Guido Pella (Argentina) Renzo Olivo	(Argentina) Facundo Argüello (Argentina) Diego Schwartzman (Argentina) Guido Andreozzi (Spain) Pere Riba
November 10	JSM Challenger of Champaign–Urbana; Champaign, United States; Hard (i) – $50,000 – 32S/32Q/16D; Singles – Doubles	(France) Adrian Mannarino; 6–2, 6–2	(Denmark) Frederik Nielsen	(Slovenia) Blaž Rola (Tunisia) Malek Jaziri	(United States) Marcos Giron (Canada) Frank Dancevic (United States) Denis Kudla (Czech Republic) Marek Michalička
November 10	JSM Challenger of Champaign–Urbana; Champaign, United States; Hard (i) – $50,000 – 32S/32Q/16D; Singles – Doubles	(United States) Ross William Guignon (United States) Tim Kopinski; 7–6^{(7–2)}, 6–2	(Canada) Frank Dancevic (Canada) Adil Shamasdin	(Slovenia) Blaž Rola (Tunisia) Malek Jaziri	(United States) Marcos Giron (Canada) Frank Dancevic (United States) Denis Kudla (Czech Republic) Marek Michalička
November 10	IPP Open; Helsinki, Finland; Hard (i) – €42,500 – 32S/22Q/16D; Singles – Doubles	(Estonia) Jürgen Zopp; 6–4, 5–7, 7–6^{(8–6)}	(Israel) Dudi Sela	(Belarus) Egor Gerasimov (Slovakia) Norbert Gomboš	(Romania) Victor Hănescu (Switzerland) Henri Laaksonen (Belgium) Niels Desein (Lithuania) Ričardas Berankis
November 10	IPP Open; Helsinki, Finland; Hard (i) – €42,500 – 32S/22Q/16D; Singles – Doubles	(Finland) Henri Kontinen (Finland) Jarkko Nieminen; 7–6^{(7–2)}, 6–4	(United Kingdom) Jonathan Marray (Germany) Philipp Petzschner	(Belarus) Egor Gerasimov (Slovakia) Norbert Gomboš	(Romania) Victor Hănescu (Switzerland) Henri Laaksonen (Belgium) Niels Desein (Lithuania) Ričardas Berankis
November 10	Keio Challenger; Yokohama, Japan; Hard – $50,000 – 32S/24Q/16D; Singles – Doubles	(Australia) John Millman; 6–4, 6–4	(United Kingdom) Kyle Edmund	(South Korea) Chung Hyeon (Japan) Go Soeda	(Japan) Tatsuma Ito (Russia) Alexander Kudryavtsev (China) Zhang Ze (Japan) Yoshihito Nishioka
November 10	Keio Challenger; Yokohama, Japan; Hard – $50,000 – 32S/24Q/16D; Singles – Doubles	(United States) Bradley Klahn (Australia) Matt Reid; 4–6, 6–4, [10–7]	(New Zealand) Marcus Daniell (New Zealand) Artem Sitak	(South Korea) Chung Hyeon (Japan) Go Soeda	(Japan) Tatsuma Ito (Russia) Alexander Kudryavtsev (China) Zhang Ze (Japan) Yoshihito Nishioka
November 17	ATP Challenger Tour Finals; São Paulo, Brazil; Clay (i) – $220,000+H – 8S; Singles	(Argentina) Diego Schwartzman; 6–2, 6–3	(Brazil) Guilherme Clezar	(Dominican Republic) Víctor Estrella Burgos (Italy) Simone Bolelli	Round Robin losers (Argentina) Máximo González (Austria) Andreas Haider-Maurer (Slovenia) Blaž Rola (Brazil) João Souza
November 17	Lima Challenger Copa Claro; Lima, Peru; Clay – $50,000+H – 32S/16Q/16D; Singles – Doubles	(Argentina) Guido Pella; 6–2, 6–4	(Australia) Jason Kubler	(Dominican Republic) José Hernández (Chile) Juan Carlos Sáez	(Brazil) Fabiano de Paula (Argentina) Juan Ignacio Londero (Spain) Roberto Carballés Baena (Chile) Hans Podlipnik Castillo
November 17	Lima Challenger Copa Claro; Lima, Peru; Clay – $50,000+H – 32S/16Q/16D; Singles – Doubles	(Peru) Sergio Galdós (Argentina) Guido Pella; 6–3, 6–1	(Brazil) Marcelo Demoliner (Venezuela) Roberto Maytín	(Dominican Republic) José Hernández (Chile) Juan Carlos Sáez	(Brazil) Fabiano de Paula (Argentina) Juan Ignacio Londero (Spain) Roberto Carballés Baena (Chile) Hans Podlipnik Castillo
November 17	Uruguay Open; Montevideo, Uruguay; Clay – $50,000 – 32S/24Q/16D; Singles – Doubles	(Uruguay) Pablo Cuevas; 6–2, 6–4	(Bolivia) Hugo Dellien	(Argentina) Pedro Cachin (Argentina) Facundo Argüello	(Chile) Nicolás Jarry (Italy) Gianluigi Quinzi (Argentina) Andrés Molteni (Spain) Jordi Samper Montaña
November 17	Uruguay Open; Montevideo, Uruguay; Clay – $50,000 – 32S/24Q/16D; Singles – Doubles	(Uruguay) Martín Cuevas (Uruguay) Pablo Cuevas; 6–2, 6–4	(Chile) Nicolás Jarry (Chile) Gonzalo Lama	(Argentina) Pedro Cachin (Argentina) Facundo Argüello	(Chile) Nicolás Jarry (Italy) Gianluigi Quinzi (Argentina) Andrés Molteni (Spain) Jordi Samper Montaña
November 17	Internazionali di Tennis Castel del Monte; Andria, Italy; Carpet (i) – €35,000+H – 32S/32Q/16D; Singles – Doubles	(Lithuania) Ričardas Berankis; 6–4, 1–0 retired	(Georgia (country)) Nikoloz Basilashvili	(Russia) Konstantin Kravchuk (Germany) Michael Berrer	(Italy) Pietro Licciardi (Bosnia and Herzegovina) Mirza Bašić (Czech Republic) Jan Mertl (Poland) Andriej Kapaś
November 17	Internazionali di Tennis Castel del Monte; Andria, Italy; Carpet (i) – €35,000+H – 32S/32Q/16D; Singles – Doubles	(Romania) Patrick Grigoriu (Romania) Costin Pavăl; 7–6^{(7–4)}, 6–7^{(4–7)}, [10–5]	(Czech Republic) Roman Jebavý (Sweden) Andreas Siljeström	(Russia) Konstantin Kravchuk (Germany) Michael Berrer	(Italy) Pietro Licciardi (Bosnia and Herzegovina) Mirza Bašić (Czech Republic) Jan Mertl (Poland) Andriej Kapaś
November 17	Dunlop World Challenge; Toyota, Japan; Carpet (i) – $40,000+H – 32S/30Q/16D; Singles – Doubles	(Japan) Go Soeda; 6–4, 7–5	(Japan) Tatsuma Ito	(Chinese Taipei) Chen Ti (Japan) Yūichi Sugita	(Japan) Arata Onozawa (Japan) Yasutaka Uchiyama (Japan) Yoshihito Nishioka (Australia) James Duckworth
November 17	Dunlop World Challenge; Toyota, Japan; Carpet (i) – $40,000+H – 32S/30Q/16D; Singles – Doubles	(Japan) Toshihide Matsui (Japan) Yasutaka Uchiyama; 7–6^{(8–6)}, 6–2	(Japan) Bumpei Sato (Chinese Taipei) Yang Tsung-hua	(Chinese Taipei) Chen Ti (Japan) Yūichi Sugita	(Japan) Arata Onozawa (Japan) Yasutaka Uchiyama (Japan) Yoshihito Nishioka (Australia) James Duckworth

== Statistical information ==
These tables present the number of singles (S) and doubles (D) titles won by each player and each nation during the season. The players/nations are sorted by: 1) total number of titles (a doubles title won by two players representing the same nation counts as only one win for the nation); 2) a singles > doubles hierarchy; 3) alphabetical order (by family names for players).

To avoid confusion and double counting, these tables should be updated only after an event is completed.

- As of 16 November 2014

=== Titles won by player ===
Total	Player	S	D	S	D
8	Diego Sebastián Schwartzman (ARG)	● ● ● ● ●	● ● ●	5	3
8	Máximo González (ARG)	● ● ●	● ● ● ● ●	3	5
7	Pablo Cuevas (URU)	● ● ● ●	● ● ●	4	3
6	Sergey Betov (BLR)		● ● ● ● ● ●	0	6
6	Alexander Bury (BLR)		● ● ● ● ● ●	0	6
6	Pierre-Hugues Herbert (FRA)	● ●	● ● ● ●	2	4
6	Sam Groth (AUS)	●	● ● ● ● ●	1	5
6	Chris Guccione (AUS)		● ● ● ● ● ●	0	6
5	Adrian Mannarino (FRA)	● ● ● ● ●		5	0
5	Gilles Müller (LUX)	● ● ● ● ●		5	0
5	Bradley Klahn (USA)	● ● ●	● ●	3	2
5	Adil Shamasdin (CAN)		● ● ● ● ●	0	5
5	Potito Starace (ITA)		● ● ● ● ●	0	5
4	Marcos Baghdatis (CYP)	● ● ● ●		4	0
4	Simone Bolelli (ITA)	● ● ● ●		4	0
4	David Goffin (BEL)	● ● ● ●		4	0
4	Horacio Zeballos (ARG)	● ●	● ●	2	2
4	Austin Krajicek (USA)	●	● ● ●	1	3
4	Saketh Myneni (IND)	●	● ● ●	1	3
4	Guido Pella (ARG)	●	● ● ●	1	3
4	Adrian Ungur (ROU)	●	● ● ●	1	3
4	Radu Albot (MDA)		● ● ● ●	0	4
4	Guillermo Durán (ARG)		● ● ● ●	0	4
4	Jaroslav Pospíšil (CZE)		● ● ● ●	0	4
4	Henri Kontinen (FIN)		● ● ● ●	0	4
3	Pablo Carreño (ESP)	● ● ●		3	0
3	Damir Džumhur (BIH)	● ● ●		3	0
3	Nick Kyrgios (AUS)	● ● ●		3	0
3	Blaž Kavčič (SLO)	● ● ●		3	0
3	Sam Querrey (USA)	● ● ●		3	0
3	Go Soeda (JPN)	● ● ●		3	0
3	Lukáš Rosol (CZE)	● ●	●	2	1
3	Sergiy Stakhovsky (UKR)	● ●	●	2	1
3	Facundo Argüello (ARG)	●	● ●	1	2
3	Ruben Bemelmans (BEL)	●	● ●	1	2
3	Yuki Bhambri (IND)	●	● ●	1	2
3	Ilija Bozoljac (SER)	●	● ●	1	2
3	Denis Kudla (USA)	●	● ●	1	2
3	Nicolas Mahut (FRA)	●	● ●	1	2
3	Andrej Martin (SVK)	●	● ●	1	2
3	Matt Reid (AUS)	●	● ●	1	2
3	Guido Andreozzi (ARG)		● ● ●	0	3
3	Facundo Bagnis (ARG)		● ● ●	0	3
3	Roman Jebavý (CZE)		● ● ●	0	3
3	Peter Polansky (CAN)		● ● ●	0	3
3	Sanam Singh (IND)		● ● ●	0	3
3	John-Patrick Smith (AUS)		● ● ●	0	3
3	Michael Venus (NZL)		● ● ●	0	3
3	Boy Westerhof (NED)		● ● ●	0	3
2	Ričardas Berankis (LTU)	● ●		2	0
2	James Duckworth (AUS)	● ●		2	0
2	Víctor Estrella Burgos (DOM)	● ●		2	0
2	Alejandro Falla (COL)	● ●		2	0
2	Peter Gojowczyk (GER)	● ●		2	0
2	Andreas Haider-Maurer (AUT)	● ●		2	0
2	Steve Johnson (USA)	● ●		2	0
2	Filip Krajinović (SRB)	● ●		2	0
2	Paolo Lorenzi (ITA)	● ●		2	0
2	John Millman (AUS)	● ●		2	0
2	Albert Ramos (ESP)	● ●		2	0
2	Viktor Troicki (SRB)	● ●		2	0
2	Alex Bolt (AUS)	●	●	1	1
2	Dustin Brown (GER)	●	●	1	1
2	Robin Haase (NED)	●	●	1	1
2	Tobias Kamke (GER)	●	●	1	1
2	Andrey Kuznetsov (RUS)	●	●	1	1
2	Lukáš Lacko (SVK)	●	●	1	1
2	Illya Marchenko (UKR)	●	●	1	1
2	Gerald Melzer (AUT)	●	●	1	1
2	Pere Riba (ESP)	●	●	1	1
2	Rajeev Ram (USA)	●	●	1	1
2	João Souza (BRA)	●	●	1	1
2	Jan-Lennard Struff (GER)	●	●	1	1
2	Jiří Veselý (CZE)	●	●	1	1
2	Matteo Viola (ITA)	●	●	1	1
2	Tomasz Bednarek (POL)		● ●	0	2
2	Andre Begemann (GER)		● ●	0	2
2	Daniele Bracciali (ITA)		● ●	0	2
2	Marcus Daniell (NZL)		● ●	0	2
2	Marcelo Demoliner (BRA)		● ●	0	2
2	Antal van der Duim (NED)		● ●	0	2
2	Marc Gicquel (FRA)		● ●	0	2
2	Daniele Giorgini (ITA)		● ●	0	2
2	Brydan Klein (GBR)		● ●	0	2
2	Nicolás Jarry) (CHI)		● ●	0	2
2	Kevin King (USA)		● ●	0	2
2	Konstantin Kravchuk (RUS)		● ●	0	2
2	Dino Marcan (CRO)		● ●	0	2
2	Roberto Maytín (VEN)		● ●	0	2
2	Dominik Meffert (GER)		● ●	0	2
2	Adrián Menéndez Maceiras (ESP)		● ●	0	2
2	Andrés Molteni (ARG)		● ●	0	2
2	Hsien-yin Peng (TPE)		● ●	0	2
2	Dane Propoggia (AUS)		● ●	0	2
2	Tim Pütz (GER)		● ●	0	2
2	César Ramírez (MEX)		● ●	0	2
2	Sanchai Ratiwatana (THA)		● ●	0	2
2	Sonchat Ratiwatana (THA)		● ●	0	2
2	Antonio Šančić (CRO)		● ●	0	2
2	Eduardo Schwank (ARG)		● ●	0	2
2	Divij Sharan (IND)		● ●	0	2
2	Artem Sitak (NZL)		● ●	0	2
2	Franko Škugor (CRO)		● ●	0	2
2	Ken Skupski (GBR)		● ●	0	2
2	Neal Skupski (GBR)		● ●	0	2
2	Juan Carlos Spir (COL)		● ●	0	2
2	Daniel Smethurst (GRB)		● ●	0	2
2	Goran Tošić (SRB)		● ●	0	2
2	Yasutaka Uchiyama (JPN)		● ●	0	2
2	Igor Zelenay (SVK)		● ●	0	2
1	Nikoloz Basilashvili (GEO)	●		1	0
1	Andreas Beck (GER)	●		1	0
1	Aljaž Bedene (SLO)	●		1	0
1	Julien Benneteau (FRA)	●		1	0
1	Carlos Berlocq (ARG)	●		1	0
1	Hyeon Chung (KOR)	●		1	0
1	Kimmer Coppejans (BEL)	●		1	0
1	Borna Ćorić (CRO)	●		1	0
1	Rogério Dutra da Silva (BRA)	●		1	0
1	Frank Dancevic (CAN)	●		1	0
1	Steve Darcis (BEL)	●		1	0
1	Thiemo de Bakker (NED)	●		1	0
1	Kenny de Schepper (FRA)	●		1	0
1	Somdev Devvarman (IND)	●		1	0
1	Farrukh Dustov (UZB)	●		1	0
1	Martin Fischer (AUT)	●		1	0
1	Daniel Gimeno Traver (ESP)	●		1	0
1	Alejandro González (COL)	●		1	0
1	Andrey Golubev (KAZ)	●		1	0
1	Jesse Huta Galung (NED)	●		1	0
1	Marsel İlhan (TUR)	●		1	0
1	Jozef Kovalík (SVK)	●		1	0
1	Jason Kubler (AUS)	●		1	0
1	Gonzalo Lama (CHI)	●		1	0
1	Yen-hsun Lu (TPE)	●		1	0
1	Albert Montañés (ESP)	●		1	0
1	Hiroki Moriya (JPN)	●		1	0
1	Yoshihito Nishioka (JPN)	●		1	0
1	Wayne Odesnik (USA)	●		1	0
1	Julian Reister (GER)	●		1	0
1	Blaž Rola (SLO)	●		1	0
1	Andreas Seppi (ITA)	●		1	0
1	Jürgen Zopp (EST)	●		1	0
1	Alexander Zverev (GER)	●		1	0
1	Ryan Agar (AUS)		●	0	1
1	Martín Alund (ARG)		●	0	1
1	Toni Androić (CRO)		●	0	1
1	Matthias Bachinger (GER)		●	0	1
1	Sebastian Bader (AUT)		●	0	1
1	Victor Baluda (RUS)		●	0	1
1	Nicolás Barrientos (COL)		●	0	1
1	Karol Beck (SVK)		●	0	1
1	Ariel Behar (URU)		●	0	1
1	Thomaz Bellucci (BRA)		●	0	1
1	Johan Brunström (SWE)		●	0	1
1	Sergei Bubka (UKR)		●	0	1
1	Chase Buchanan (USA)		●	0	1
1	Juan Sebastián Cabal (COL)		●	0	1
1	Marco Cecchinato (ITA)		●	0	1
1	František Čermák (CZE)		●	0	1
1	Iñigo Cervantes Huegun (ESP)		●	0	1
1	Ti Chen (TPE)		●	0	1
1	Marco Chiudinelli (SUI)		●	0	1
1	Flavio Cipolla (ITA)		●	0	1
1	Edward Corrie (GBR)		●	0	1
1	Daniel Cox (GBR)		●	0	1
1	Martín Cuevas (URU)		●	0	1
1	Fabiano de Paula (BRA)		●	0	1
1	Niels Desein (BEL)		●	0	1
1	Matteo Donati (ITA)		●	0	1
1	Marin Draganja (CRO)		●	0	1
1	Michail Elgin (RUS)		●	0	1
1	Robert Farah (COL)		●	0	1
1	Colin Fleming (GBR)		●	0	1
1	Sergio Galdós (PER)		●	0	1
1	Christian Garin (CHI)		●	0	1
1	Ruben Gonzales (PHI)		●	0	1
1	Gerard Granollers (ESP)		●	0	1
1	Maoxin Gong (CHN)		●	0	1
1	Santiago González (MEX)		●	0	1
1	Laurynas Grigelis (LTU)		●	0	1
1	Patrick Grigoriu (ROM)		●	0	1
1	Ross William Guignon (USA)		●	0	1
1	Treat Conrad Huey (PHI)		●	0	1
1	Adam Hubble (AUS)		●	0	1
1	Pruchya Isaro (THA)		●	0	1
1	Jarmere Jenkins (USA)		●	0	1
1	Rameez Junaid (AUS)		●	0	1
1	Nuttanon Kadchapanan (THA)		●	0	1
1	Robin Kern (GER)		●	0	1
1	Thanasi Kokkinakis (AUS)		●	0	1
1	Wesley Koolhof (NED)		●	0	1
1	Tim Kopinski (USA)		●	0	1
1	Gero Kretschmer (GER)		●	0	1
1	Alexander Kudryavtsev (RUS)		●	0	1
1	Andrey Kuznetsov (RUS)		●	0	1
1	Tristan Lamasine (FRA)		●	0	1
1	Miķelis Lībietis (LAT)		●	0	1
1	Scott Lipsky (USA)		●	0	1
1	Juan Lizariturry (ESP)		●	0	1
1	Laurent Lokoli (FRA)		●	0	1
1	Enrique López Pérez (ESP)		●	0	1
1	Jonathan Marray (GBR)		●	0	1
1	Philipp Marx (GER)		●	0	1
1	Toshihide Matsui (JPN)		●	0	1
1	Michal Mertiňák (SVK)		●	0	1
1	Matwé Middelkoop (NED)		●	0	1
1	Denys Molchanov (UKR)		●	0	1
1	Nicholas Monroe (USA)		●	0	1
1	Alessandro Motti (ITA)		●	0	1
1	Stefano Napolitano (ITA)		●	0	1
1	Aleksandr Nedovyesov (KAZ)		●	0	1
1	Frederik Nielsen (DEN)		●	0	1
1	Jarkko Nieminen (FIN)		●	0	1
1	Albano Olivetti (FRA)		●	0	1
1	Josselin Ouanna (FRA)		●	0	1
1	Costin Pavăl (ROM)		●	0	1
1	Ante Pavić (CRO)		●	0	1
1	Mate Pavić (CRO)		●	0	1
1	Adam Pavlásek (CZE)		●	0	1
1	Hans Podlipnik-Castillo (CHI)		●	0	1
1	Miguel Ángel Reyes-Varela (MEX)		●	0	1
1	Purav Raja (IND)		●	0	1
1	Hunter Reese (USA)		●	0	1
1	Fernando Romboli (BRA)		●	0	1
1	André Sá (BRA)		●	0	1
1	Mohamed Safwat (EGY)		●	0	1
1	Jordi Samper Montaña (ESP)		●	0	1
1	Tennys Sandgren (USA)		●	0	1
1	Alexander Satschko (GER)		●	0	1
1	Andreas Siljeström (SWE)		●	0	1
1	Andreas Siljeström (SWE)		●	0	1
1	Eduardo Struvay (COL)		●	0	1
1	Sean Thornley (GBR)		●	0	1
1	Stefano Travaglia (ITA)		●	0	1
1	Antonio Veić (CRO)		●	0	1
1	Andrew Whittington (AUS)		●	0	1

=== Titles won by nation ===
Total	Nation	S	D
27	Argentina (ARG)	12	15
24	United States (USA)	12	12
21	Australia (AUS)	8	13
18	Italy (ITA)	7	11
15	Germany (GER)	7	8
14	Spain (ESP)	8	6
14	France (FRA)	7	7
11	Czech Republic (CZE)	3	8
10	India (IND)	3	7
9	Slovakia (SVK)	3	6
8	Serbia (SRB)	5	3
8	Croatia (CRO)	1	7
7	Canada (CAN)	1	6
7	Russia (RUS)	1	6
6	Belgium (BEL)	6	0
6	Austria (AUT)	4	2
6	Brazil (BRA)	2	4
6	Colombia (COL)	2	4
6	Netherlands (NED)	2	4
6	New Zealand (NZL)	0	6
5	Luxembourg (LUX)	5	0
5	Slovenia (SLO)	5	0
5	Japan (JPN)	4	1
5	Uruguay (URU)	2	3
5	Belarus (BLR)	0	5
5	Great Britain (GBR)	0	5
4	Ukraine (UKR)	2	2
4	Chinese Taipei (TPE)	1	3
4	Romania (ROU)	1	3
4	Moldova (MDA)	0	4
3	Bosnia and Herzegovina (BIH)	3	0
3	Chile (CHI)	1	2
3	Finland (FIN)	0	3
3	Mexico (MEX)	0	3
3	Thailand (THA)	0	3
2	Cyprus (CYP)	2	0
2	Dominican Republic (DOM)	2	0
2	Poland (POL)	0	2
2	Venezuela (VEN)	0	2
1	Georgia (GEO)	1	0
1	Kazakhstan (KAZ)	1	0
1	South Korea (KOR)	1	0
1	Lithuania (LTU)	1	0
1	Turkey (TUR)	1	0
1	Uzbekistan (UZB)	1	0
1	China (CHN)	0	1
1	Egypt (EGY)	0	1
1	Kazakhstan (KAZ)	0	1
1	Philippines (PHI)	0	1
1	Sweden (SWE)	0	1
1	Switzerland (SWI)	0	1

== Point distribution ==
Points are awarded as follows:

Tournament Category	Singles										Doubles				
Tournament Category	W	F	SF	QF	R16	R32	Q	Q3	Q2	Q1	W	F	SF	QF	R16
Challenger Tour Finals	RR+80	RR+30	15 per round robin win				N/A				Not Held				
Challenger $125,000+H; Challenger €106,500+H	125	75	45	25	10	0	+5	0	0	0	125	75	45	25	0
Challenger $125,000 or $100,000+H; Challenger €106,500 or €85,000+H	110	65	40	20	9	0	+5	0	0	0	110	65	40	20	0
Challenger $100,000 or $75,000+H; Challenger €85,000 or €64,000+H	100	60	35	18	8	0	+5	0	0	0	100	60	35	18	0
Challenger $75,000 or $50,000+H; Challenger €64,000 or €42,500+H	90	55	33	17	8	0	+5	0	0	0	90	55	33	17	0
Challenger $50,000; Challenger €42,500	80	48	29	15	7	0	+3	0	0	0	80	48	29	15	0
Challenger $40,000+H; Challenger €35,000+H	80	48	29	15	6	0	+3	0	0	0	80	48	29	15	0
