= 2015 San Luis Open Challenger Tour – Doubles =

Doubles
- 2015 San Luis Open Challenger Tour

Final
- Champions: (Argentina) Guillermo Durán (Argentina) Horacio Zeballos
- Runners-up: (Peru) Sergio Galdos (Argentina) Guido Pella
- Score: 7–6^{(7–4)}, 6–4

Events
Singles	Doubles
- San Luis Open Challenger Tour

Kevin King and Juan Carlos Spir were the defending champions, but Spir did not participate. King partnered with Dean O'Brien and lost in the semifinals.

Guillermo Durán and Horacio Zeballos won the title, defeating Sergio Galdos and Guido Pella in the final, 7–6^{(7–4)}, 6–4.

== Seeds ==
1. (Poland) Mariusz Fyrstenberg / (Pakistan) Aisam-ul-Haq Qureshi (quarterfinals)
2. (Argentina) Guillermo Durán / (Argentina) Horacio Zeballos (champions)
3. (New Zealand) Marcus Daniell / (India) Divij Sharan (first round)
4. (Colombia) Nicolás Barrientos / (Colombia) Eduardo Struvay (first round)

== Draw ==
Key

- Q = Qualifier
- WC = Wild card
- LL = Lucky loser
- Alt = Alternate
- ITF = ITF entry
- PR = Protected ranking
- SR = Special ranking
- SE = Special exempt
- JE = Junior exempt
- JR = Junior Accelerator Programme entrant
- CO = College Accelerator Programme entrant
- NG = Next Gen Accelerator Program entrant
- w/o = Walkover
- r = Retired
- d = Defaulted

First round
1	(Poland) M Fyrstenberg (Pakistan) A-u-H Qureshi	6	6
(Spain) A Menéndez-Maceiras (Mexico) C Ramírez	3	4
(Peru) S Galdós (Argentina) G Pella	6	6
(Brazil) G Clezar (Brazil) F de Paula	3	2
3	(New Zealand) M Daniell (India) D Sharan	3	5
Alt	(Uruguay) A Behar (Argentina) R Olivo	6	7
(Brazil) M Demoliner (Mexico) MA Reyes-Varela	6	1	[12]
WC	(Mexico) D Garza (Mexico) L Patiño	2	6	[14]
(Argentina) JI Londero (Argentina) A Molteni	7^{7}	2	[12]
(Austria) G Melzer (Chile) H Podlipnik-Castillo	6^{5}	6	[14]
(United States) K King (South Africa) D O'Brien	6	7^{8}
4	(Colombia) N Barrientos (Colombia) E Struvay	3	6^{6}
(United States) C Buchanan (United States) A Krajicek	6	6
WC	(Mexico) Mauricio Astorga (Mexico) L Gómez	3	4
WC	(Mexico) T Hank (Mexico) M Sánchez	6	2	[9]
2	(Argentina) G Durán (Argentina) H Zeballos	3	6	[11]

Quarterfinals
1	(Poland) M Fyrstenberg (Pakistan) A-u-H Qureshi	6	4	[8]
(Peru) S Galdós (Argentina) G Pella	2	6	[10]
Alt	(Uruguay) A Behar (Argentina) R Olivo	7	6
WC	(Mexico) D Garza (Mexico) L Patiño	5	4
(Austria) G Melzer (Chile) H Podlipnik-Castillo	3	4
(United States) K King (South Africa) D O'Brien	6	6
(United States) C Buchanan (United States) A Krajicek	3	6	[4]
2	(Argentina) G Durán (Argentina) H Zeballos	6	2	[10]

Semifinals
(Peru) S Galdós (Argentina) G Pella	6	6
(Uruguay) A Behar (Argentina) R Olivo	4	4
(United States) K King (South Africa) D O'Brien	5	6	[4]
2	(Argentina) G Durán (Argentina) H Zeballos	7	2	[10]

Final
(Peru) S Galdós (Argentina) G Pella	6^{4}	4
2	(Argentina) G Durán (Argentina) H Zeballos	7^{7}	6
