= 2013 San Luis Open Challenger – Singles =

Singles
- 2013 San Luis Open Challenger

Final
- Champion: (Italy) Alessio di Mauro
- Runner-up: (United States) Daniel Kosakowski
- Score: 4–6, 6–3, 6–2

Events
Singles	Doubles
- San Luis Open Challenger

Rubén Ramírez Hidalgo was the defending champion, but chose not to compete.
Alessio di Mauro defeated Daniel Kosakowski 4–6, 6–3, 6–2 in the final to win the title.

== Seeds ==
1. (Australia) John Millman (second round)
2. (France) Jonathan Dasnières de Veigy (second round)
3. (Argentina) Diego Sebastián Schwartzman (first round)
4. (Switzerland) Marco Chiudinelli (semifinals)
5. (Tunisia) Malek Jaziri (second round)
6. (Germany) Peter Gojowczyk (quarterfinals)
7. (Slovakia) Andrej Martin (first round)
8. (Argentina) Agustín Velotti (quarterfinals, withdrew)

== Draw ==
Key

- Q = Qualifier
- WC = Wild card
- LL = Lucky loser
- Alt = Alternate
- ITF = ITF entry
- PR = Protected ranking
- SR = Special ranking
- SE = Special exempt
- JE = Junior exempt
- JR = Junior Accelerator Programme entrant
- CO = College Accelerator Programme entrant
- NG = Next Gen Accelerator Program entrant
- w/o = Walkover
- r = Retired
- d = Defaulted

=== Finals ===
Semifinals
(United States) Daniel Kosakowski	6	6
4	(Switzerland) Marco Chiudinelli	3	4
(United States) Tennys Sandgren	6	4	2
Q	(Italy) Alessio di Mauro	3	6	6

Final
(United States) Daniel Kosakowski	6	3	2
Q	(Italy) Alessio di Mauro	4	6	6

=== Top half ===
First round
1	(Australia) J Millman	6	6
WC	(Mexico) M Sánchez	1	0
(United States) D Kosakowski	6	4	7
(Australia) M Reid	3	6	5
Q	(Guatemala) C Díaz Figueroa	6	6
WC	(Mexico) M Gallardo Valles	2	3
(Czech Republic) D Lojda	6	3	5
8	(Argentina) A Velotti	2	6	7
4	(Switzerland) M Chiudinelli	4
(Georgia (country)) N Basilashvili	4^{r}
(Australia) G Jones	6	6
(Italy) R Ghedin	3	2
Alt	(Spain) A Menéndez Maceiras	7^{8}	5	6
WC	(Chile) N Massú	6^{6}	7	4
(Brazil) M Demoliner	7^{8}	3	3
6	(Germany) P Gojowczyk	6^{6}	6	6

Second round
1	(Australia) J Millman	4	6	5
(United States) D Kosakowski	6	0	7
Q	(Guatemala) C Díaz Figueroa	6^{3}	4
8	(Argentina) A Velotti	7^{7}	6
4	(Switzerland) M Chiudinelli	6	7^{8}
(Australia) G Jones	3	6^{6}
Alt	(Spain) A Menéndez Maceiras	6	6^{8}	5
6	(Germany) P Gojowczyk	1	7^{10}	7

Quarterfinals
(United States) D Kosakowski	w/o
8	(Argentina) A Velotti
4	(Switzerland) M Chiudinelli	6	2	6
6	(Germany) P Gojowczyk	4	6	1

Semifinals
(United States) D Kosakowski	6	6
4	(Switzerland) M Chiudinelli	3	4

=== Bottom half ===
First round
7	(Slovakia) A Martin	3	3
(United States) T Sandgren	6	6
(Italy) S Vagnozzi	6	4	5
(Italy) T Fabbiano	4	6	7
(Germany) P Torebko	6	7^{7}
WC	(Mexico) D Garza	3	6^{0}
(France) M Teixeira	7^{7}	2	6
3	(Argentina) DS Schwartzman	6^{4}	6	3
5	(Tunisia) M Jaziri	6	6
Q	(Philippines) R Gonzales	4	4
Q	(Italy) A di Mauro	6	6
(Germany) N Langer	1	4
(France) G Burquier	6	2	6
(France) Florian Reynet	2	6	1
Q	(El Salvador) M Arévalo	5	3
2	(France) J Dasnières de Veigy	7	6

Second round
(United States) T Sandgren	2	7^{13}	6
(Italy) T Fabbiano	6	6^{11}	2
(Germany) P Torebko	3	6	4
(France) M Teixeira	6	2	6
5	(Tunisia) M Jaziri	2	6^{3}
Q	(Italy) A di Mauro	6	7^{7}
(France) G Burquier	6	4	6
2	(France) J Dasnières de Veigy	0	6	0

Quarterfinals
(United States) T Sandgren	6	7^{7}
(France) M Teixeira	0	6^{4}
Q	(Italy) A di Mauro	6	6
(France) G Burquier	2	1

Semifinals
(United States) T Sandgren	6	4	2
Q	(Italy) A di Mauro	3	6	6
