= 2014 Indore Open ATP Challenger – Singles =

Singles
- 2014 Indore Open ATP Challenger

Final
- Champion: (India) Saketh Myneni
- Runner-up: (Kazakhstan) Aleksandr Nedovyesov
- Score: 6–3, 6–7^{(4–7)}, 6–3

Events
Singles	Doubles
Indore Open ATP Challenger

This was the first edition of the tournament.

Saketh Myneni won the title by defeating Aleksandr Nedovyesov 6–3, 6–7^{(4–7)}, 6–3 in the final.

== Seeds ==
1. (Kazakhstan) Aleksandr Nedovyesov (final)
2. (Russia) Alexander Kudryavtsev (first round)
3. (India) Somdev Devvarman (second round)
4. (Japan) Hiroki Moriya (first round)
5. (Spain) Adrián Menéndez-Maceiras (quarterfinals)
6. (India) Yuki Bhambri (second round)
7. (Belgium) Kimmer Coppejans (second round)
8. (Italy) Stefano Travaglia (semifinals)

== Draw ==
=== Key ===
- Q = Qualifier
- WC = Wild card
- LL = Lucky loser
- Alt = Alternate
- SE = Special exempt
- PR = Protected ranking
- ITF = ITF entry
- JE = Junior exempt
- w/o = Walkover
- r = Retired
- d = Defaulted
- SR = Special ranking

=== Finals ===
Semifinals
1	(Kazakhstan) Aleksandr Nedovyesov	6	6
8	(Italy) Stefano Travaglia	3	3
(India) Ramkumar Ramanathan	2	1
(India) Saketh Myneni	6	6

Final
1	(Kazakhstan) Aleksandr Nedovyesov	3	7^{7}	3
(India) Saketh Myneni	6	6^{4}	6

=== Top half ===
First round
1	(Kazakhstan) A Nedovyesov	6	6
Q	(India) L Sood	3	1
(Belgium) G Gigounon	3	7^{7}	7
(Germany) R Becker	6	6^{5}	5
WC	(India) Sidharth Rawat	3	4
Q	(Italy) R Ghedin	6	6
(Belgium) Y Reuter	5	4
5	(Spain) A Menéndez-Maceiras	7	6
3	(India) S Devvarman	6	6
WC	(India) V Vardhan	1	3
(Chinese Taipei) L-C Huang	7^{8}	7^{8}
(Japan) Y Uchiyama	6^{6}	6^{6}
WC	(India) S Mukund	4	1
(Czech Republic) A Pavlásek	6	6
(India) S Balaji	6	4	6^{7}
8	(Italy) S Travaglia	4	6	7^{9}

Second round
1	(Kazakhstan) A Nedovyesov	6	6
(Belgium) G Gigounon	3	4
Q	(Italy) R Ghedin	1	3
5	(Spain) A Menéndez-Maceiras	6	6
3	(India) S Devvarman	7^{7}	4	4
(Chinese Taipei) L-C Huang	6^{4}	6	6
(Czech Republic) A Pavlásek	5	2
8	(Italy) S Travaglia	7	6

Quarterfinals
1	(Kazakhstan) A Nedovyesov	7^{7}	7^{7}
5	(Spain) A Menéndez-Maceiras	6^{4}	6^{4}
(Chinese Taipei) L-C Huang	3	6^{3}
8	(Italy) S Travaglia	6	7^{7}

Semifinals
1	(Kazakhstan) A Nedovyesov	6	6
8	(Italy) S Travaglia	3	3

=== Bottom half ===
First round
6	(India) Y Bhambri	6	6
WC	(India) Ronit Singh Bisht	4	0
(India) R Ramanathan	6	6
(Italy) G Quinzi	1	4
Q	(India) R Virali-Murugesan	2	1
(Chinese Taipei) T Chen	6	6
(France) F Martin	6	6
4	(Japan) H Moriya	1	3
7	(Belgium) K Coppejans	7	6
(India) J Nedunchezhiyan	5	2
(Thailand) D Udomchoke	0	2
(India) S Myneni	6	6
Q	(India) VS Prashanth	6	6
(India) Karunuday Singh	4	2
(India) S Singh	7	6
2	(Russia) A Kudryavtsev	5	3

Second round
6	(India) Y Bhambri	6^{4}	3
(India) R Ramanathan	7^{7}	6
(Chinese Taipei) T Chen	6^{5}	6	6
(France) F Martin	7^{7}	4	4
7	(Belgium) K Coppejans	6	3	6^{4}
(India) S Myneni	1	6	7^{7}
Q	(India) VS Prashanth	6	6^{5}	3
(India) S Singh	4	7^{7}	6

Quarterfinals
(India) R Ramanathan	6^{6}	7^{7}	7
(Chinese Taipei) T Chen	7^{8}	6^{2}	5
(India) S Myneni	7^{7}	6
(India) S Singh	6^{5}	3

Semifinals
(India) R Ramanathan	2	1
(India) S Myneni	6	6
