= 2019 San Luis Open Challenger Tour – Doubles =

Doubles
- 2019 San Luis Open Challenger Tour

Final
- Champions: (El Salvador) Marcelo Arévalo (Mexico) Miguel Ángel Reyes-Varela
- Runners-up: (Uruguay) Ariel Behar (Ecuador) Roberto Quiroz
- Score: 1–6, 6–4, [12–10]

Events
Singles	Doubles
- San Luis Open Challenger Tour

Marcelo Arévalo and Miguel Ángel Reyes-Varela were the defending champions and successfully defended their title, defeating Ariel Behar and Roberto Quiroz 1–6, 6–4, [12–10] in the final.

== Seeds ==
1. (El Salvador) Marcelo Arévalo / (Mexico) Miguel Ángel Reyes-Varela (champions)
2. (Mexico) Hans Hach Verdugo / (Croatia) Ante Pavić (first round)
3. (Australia) John-Patrick Smith / (Netherlands) Sem Verbeek (quarterfinals)
4. (United States) Evan King / (United States) Nathan Pasha (quarterfinals)

== Draw ==
Key

- Q = Qualifier
- WC = Wild card
- LL = Lucky loser
- Alt = Alternate
- ITF = ITF entry
- PR = Protected ranking
- SR = Special ranking
- SE = Special exempt
- JE = Junior exempt
- JR = Junior Accelerator Programme entrant
- CO = College Accelerator Programme entrant
- NG = Next Gen Accelerator Program entrant
- w/o = Walkover
- r = Retired
- d = Defaulted

First round
1	(El Salvador) M Arévalo (Mexico) MÁ Reyes-Varela	6	6
ITF	(France) Baptiste Crepatte (France) M Guinard	2	2
(Spain) A Menéndez Maceiras (Spain) R Ortega Olmedo	6	6
Alt	(Peru) S Galdós (Bolivia) F Zeballos	4	4
4	(United States) E King (United States) N Pasha	6	6
(Austria) L Miedler (Austria) S Ofner	4	3
(Ecuador) G Escobar (Venezuela) LD Martínez	6	6
(United States) JP Fruttero (Switzerland) M-A Hüsler	4	4
(Uruguay) A Behar (Ecuador) R Quiroz	6	6
(Germany) D Brown (Canada) A Shamasdin	4	4
WC	(United States) E Escobedo (Mexico) M Sánchez	6^{3}	3
3	(Australia) J-P Smith (Netherlands) S Verbeek	7^{7}	6
WC	(Colombia) N Mejía (United States) E Nava	6^{0}	6	[10]
ITF	(Argentina) MF Descotte (Brazil) J Souza	7^{7}	4	[5]
WC	(Argentina) R Olivo (Mexico) L Patiño	7	6
2	(Mexico) H Hach Verdugo (Croatia) A Pavić	5	3

Quarterfinals
1	(El Salvador) M Arévalo (Mexico) MÁ Reyes-Varela	7	6
(Spain) A Menéndez Maceiras (Spain) R Ortega Olmedo	5	4
4	(United States) E King (United States) N Pasha	6^{5}	3
(Ecuador) G Escobar (Venezuela) LD Martínez	7^{7}	6
(Uruguay) A Behar (Ecuador) R Quiroz	6	7
3	(Australia) J-P Smith (Netherlands) S Verbeek	4	5
WC	(Colombia) N Mejía (United States) E Nava	6	5	[6]
WC	(Argentina) R Olivo (Mexico) L Patiño	3	7	[10]

Semifinals
1	(El Salvador) M Arévalo (Mexico) MÁ Reyes-Varela	5	6	[10]
(Ecuador) G Escobar (Venezuela) LD Martínez	7	3	[7]
(Uruguay) A Behar (Ecuador) R Quiroz	6	4	[10]
WC	(Argentina) R Olivo (Mexico) L Patiño	4	6	[7]

Final
1	(El Salvador) M Arévalo (Mexico) MÁ Reyes-Varela	1	6	[12]
(Uruguay) A Behar (Ecuador) R Quiroz	6	4	[10]
