= 2015 San Luis Open Challenger Tour – Singles =

Singles
- 2015 San Luis Open Challenger Tour

Final
- Champion: (Argentina) Guido Pella
- Runner-up: (Republic of Ireland) James McGee
- Score: 6–3, 6–3

Events
Singles	Doubles
- San Luis Open Challenger Tour

Paolo Lorenzi was the defending champion, but lost in the semifinals.

Guido Pella won the title, defeating James McGee in the final, 6–3, 6–3.

== Seeds ==
1. (Russia) Teymuraz Gabashvili (quarterfinals)
2. (Italy) Paolo Lorenzi (semifinals)
3. (Bosnia and Herzegovina) Damir Džumhur (first round)
4. (Australia) James Duckworth (semifinals)
5. (Italy) Luca Vanni (withdrew)
6. (Spain) Adrián Menéndez Maceiras (quarterfinals)
7. (United States) Austin Krajicek (second round)
8. (Argentina) Horacio Zeballos (first round)

== Draw ==
Key

- Q = Qualifier
- WC = Wild card
- LL = Lucky loser
- Alt = Alternate
- ITF = ITF entry
- PR = Protected ranking
- SR = Special ranking
- SE = Special exempt
- JE = Junior exempt
- JR = Junior Accelerator Programme entrant
- CO = College Accelerator Programme entrant
- NG = Next Gen Accelerator Program entrant
- w/o = Walkover
- r = Retired
- d = Defaulted

=== Finals ===
Semifinals
(Argentina) Guido Pella	6	6
4	(Australia) James Duckworth	3	3
(Republic of Ireland) James McGee	6	5	6
2	(Italy) Paolo Lorenzi	3	7	3

Final
(Argentina) Guido Pella	6	6
(Republic of Ireland) James McGee	3	3

=== Top half ===
First round
1	(Russia) T Gabashvili	3	6	6
WC	(Mexico) Mauricio Astorga	6	2	3
(Chile) H Podlipnik Castillo	6	6
Q	(Colombia) E Struvay	1	4
(Argentina) G Pella	6	6
WC	(Mexico) D Garza	3	4
(Germany) N Langer	3	3
7	(United States) A Krajicek	6	6
4	(Australia) J Duckworth	3	6	6
(El Salvador) M Arévalo	6	3	2
Q	(Ecuador) I Endara	6	6
Q	(Colombia) JS Gómez	3	4
WC	(Mexico) M Sánchez	7^{7}	7^{7}
(Ecuador) G Escobar	6^{5}	6^{5}
(Brazil) F de Paula	2	1
6	(Spain) A Menéndez Maceiras	6	6

Second round
1	(Russia) T Gabashvili	6^{8}	6	7^{7}
(Chile) H Podlipnik Castillo	7^{10}	3	6^{5}
(Argentina) G Pella	7^{7}	7
7	(United States) A Krajicek	6^{3}	5
4	(Australia) J Duckworth	7^{7}	6
Q	(Ecuador) I Endara	6^{5}	4
WC	(Mexico) M Sánchez	4	4
6	(Spain) A Menéndez Maceiras	6	6

Quarterfinals
1	(Russia) T Gabashvili	6	4	3
(Argentina) G Pella	2	6	6
4	(Australia) J Duckworth	6	6
6	(Spain) A Menéndez Maceiras	1	4

Semifinals
(Argentina) G Pella	6	6
4	(Australia) J Duckworth	3	3

=== Bottom half ===
First round
LL	(Ecuador) G Lapentti	6	7
(United States) C Buchanan	0	5
(Argentina) R Olivo	6^{5}	6	1
Alt	(Argentina) A Molteni	7^{7}	4	6
(United States) Connor Smith	2	5
(Brazil) G Clezar	6	7
(Republic of Ireland) J McGee	7	6
3	(Bosnia and Herzegovina) D Džumhur	5	3
8	(Argentina) H Zeballos	7^{7}	5	6^{3}
(Argentina) JI Londero	6^{3}	7	7^{7}
(United Kingdom) B Klein	1	7^{10}	1
Q	(Brazil) C Zampieri	6	6^{8}	6
WC	(Mexico) T Hank	6	3	4
(Austria) G Melzer	4	6	6
(United States) D Novikov	4	1
2	(Italy) P Lorenzi	6	6

Second round
LL	(Ecuador) G Lapentti	6	4	1
Alt	(Argentina) A Molteni	1	6	6
(Brazil) G Clezar	3	6	6^{4}
(Republic of Ireland) J McGee	6	2	7^{7}
(Argentina) JI Londero	3	6	7^{7}
Q	(Brazil) C Zampieri	6	4	6^{4}
(Austria) G Melzer	2	6	5
2	(Italy) P Lorenzi	6	4	7

Quarterfinals
Alt	(Argentina) A Molteni	1	4
(Republic of Ireland) J McGee	6	6
(Argentina) JI Londero	4	4
2	(Italy) P Lorenzi	6	6

Semifinals
(Republic of Ireland) J McGee	6	5	6
2	(Italy) P Lorenzi	3	7	3
