= 2019 San Luis Open Challenger Tour – Singles =

Singles
- 2019 San Luis Open Challenger Tour

Final
- Champion: (Switzerland) Marc-Andrea Hüsler
- Runner-up: (Spain) Adrián Menéndez Maceiras
- Score: 7–5, 7–6^{(7–3)}

Events
Singles	Doubles
- San Luis Open Challenger Tour

Marcelo Arévalo was the defending champion but lost in the second round to Marcelo Tomás Barrios Vera.

Marc-Andrea Hüsler won the title after defeating Adrián Menéndez Maceiras 7–5, 7–6^{(7–3)} in the final.

== Seeds ==
All seeds receive a bye into the second round.

1. (Kazakhstan) Alexander Bublik (third round)
2. (Spain) Adrián Menéndez Maceiras (final)
3. (Germany) Dustin Brown (second round)
4. (Austria) Sebastian Ofner (second round)
5. (Bosnia and Herzegovina) Mirza Bašić (second round)
6. (Ecuador) Roberto Quiroz (third round)
7. (Serbia) Peđa Krstin (second round)
8. (Egypt) Mohamed Safwat (second round)
9. (Australia) John-Patrick Smith (second round)
10. (Slovenia) Blaž Rola (second round)
11. (Austria) Lucas Miedler (quarterfinals)
12. (El Salvador) Marcelo Arévalo (second round)
13. (Netherlands) Scott Griekspoor (second round)
14. (Spain) Roberto Ortega Olmedo (second round)
15. (Dominican Republic) Roberto Cid Subervi (second round)
16. (Serbia) Danilo Petrović (second round)

== Draw ==
Key

- Q = Qualifier
- WC = Wild card
- LL = Lucky loser
- Alt = Alternate
- ITF = ITF entry
- PR = Protected ranking
- SR = Special ranking
- SE = Special exempt
- JE = Junior exempt
- JR = Junior Accelerator Programme entrant
- CO = College Accelerator Programme entrant
- NG = Next Gen Accelerator Program entrant
- w/o = Walkover
- r = Retired
- d = Defaulted

=== Finals ===
Quarterfinals
Alt	(Brazil) Pedro Sakamoto	2	6	6
(Chile) Marcelo Tomás Barrios Vera	6	1	4
(Switzerland) Marc-Andrea Hüsler	4	7	6
11	(Austria) Lucas Miedler	6	5	3
PR	(Argentina) Facundo Mena	7^{7}	7^{7}
(Croatia) Ante Pavić	6^{5}	6^{4}
(France) Alexandre Müller	0	2
2	(Spain) Adrián Menéndez Maceiras	6	6

Semifinals
Alt	(Brazil) Pedro Sakamoto	2	4
(Switzerland) Marc-Andrea Hüsler	6	6
PR	(Argentina) Facundo Mena	6	3	5
2	(Spain) Adrián Menéndez Maceiras	4	6	7

Final
(Switzerland) Marc-Andrea Hüsler	7	7^{7}
2	(Spain) Adrián Menéndez Maceiras	5	6^{3}

=== Top half ===
==== Section 1 ====
First round
(United States) K King	7^{9}	6^{4}	6
(United States) E King	6^{7}	7^{7}	3
(Slovakia) A Molčan	4	2
Alt	(Brazil) P Sakamoto	6	6
(Chile) MT Barrios Vera	6	6
(Argentina) R Olivo	4	2
Q	(Mexico) G López Villaseñor	5	7^{7}	3
ITF	(Brazil) J Souza	7	6^{4}	6

Second round
1	(Kazakhstan) A Bublik	6	6
(United States) K King	4	3
Alt	(Brazil) P Sakamoto	6	6
14	(Spain) R Ortega Olmedo	4	2
12	(El Salvador) M Arévalo	4	4
(Chile) MT Barrios Vera	6	6
ITF	(Brazil) J Souza	6	6
8	(Egypt) M Safwat	3	4

Third round
1	(Kazakhstan) A Bublik	3	5
Alt	(Brazil) P Sakamoto	6	7
(Chile) MT Barrios Vera	w/o
ITF	(Brazil) J Souza

Quarterfinals
Alt	(Brazil) P Sakamoto	2	6	6
(Chile) MT Barrios Vera	6	1	4

==== Section 2 ====
First round
(Peru) JP Varillas	5	3
(Ecuador) G Escobar	7	6
(Switzerland) M-A Hüsler	6	6
Q	(Netherlands) S Verbeek	1	4
WC	(Serbia) J Tipsarević	6	5	6
WC	(Mexico) L Gómez	4	7	2
ITF	(Chile) A Tabilo	7^{7}	7
ITF	(France) M Guinard	6^{1}	5

Second round
3	(Germany) D Brown	6	2	4
(Ecuador) G Escobar	4	6	6
(Switzerland) M-A Hüsler	6	6
16	(Serbia) D Petrović	3	4
11	(Austria) L Miedler	7	3	6
WC	(Serbia) J Tipsarević	5	6	3
ITF	(Chile) A Tabilo	4	6^{3}
6	(Ecuador) R Quiroz	6	7^{7}

Third round
(Ecuador) G Escobar	4	7^{7}	4
(Switzerland) M-A Hüsler	6	6^{5}	6
11	(Austria) L Miedler	6	6
6	(Ecuador) R Quiroz	4	4

Quarterfinals
(Switzerland) M-A Hüsler	4	7	6
11	(Austria) L Miedler	6	5	3

=== Bottom half ===
==== Section 3 ====
First round
PR	(Spain) C Gómez-Herrera	7	6
(Serbia) M Zekić	5	3
PR	(Argentina) F Mena	4	6	6
(Japan) Y Takahashi	6	3	0
(Norway) V Durasovic	6	3	5
(Croatia) A Pavić	4	6	7
(Dominican Republic) V Estrella Burgos	5	1
(United States) E Escobedo	7	6

Second round
5	(Bosnia and Herzegovina) M Bašić	7	2	1
PR	(Spain) C Gómez-Herrera	5	6	6
PR	(Argentina) F Mena	6	6
10	(Slovenia) B Rola	2	4
15	(Dominican Republic) R Cid Subervi	3	6	3
(Croatia) A Pavić	6	1	6
(United States) E Escobedo	7	2	6
4	(Austria) S Ofner	5	6	4

Third round
PR	(Spain) C Gómez-Herrera	2	4
PR	(Argentina) F Mena	6	6
(Croatia) A Pavić	6	4	7^{7}
(United States) E Escobedo	2	6	6^{5}

Quarterfinals
PR	(Argentina) F Mena	7^{7}	7^{7}
(Croatia) A Pavić	6^{5}	6^{4}

==== Section 4 ====
First round
(Argentina) MF Descotte	7^{9}	4	3
ITF	(Brazil) J Menezes	6^{7}	6	6
WC	(Colombia) N Mejía	6^{5}	5
(France) A Müller	7^{7}	7
ITF	(France) Baptiste Crepatte	3	6^{8}
Alt	(Brazil) T Seyboth Wild	6	7^{10}
WC	(Mexico) M Sánchez	6	7
WC	(United States) E Nava	2	5

Second round
7	(Serbia) P Krstin	1	1
ITF	(Brazil) J Menezes	6	6
(France) A Müller	6	4	7^{7}
9	(Australia) J-P Smith	4	6	6^{5}
13	(Netherlands) S Griekspoor	4	4
Alt	(Brazil) T Seyboth Wild	6	6
WC	(Mexico) M Sánchez	6	1	2
2	(Spain) A Menéndez Maceiras	3	6	6

Third round
ITF	(Brazil) J Menezes	6	3	4
(France) A Müller	3	6	6
Alt	(Brazil) T Seyboth Wild	2	4
2	(Spain) A Menéndez Maceiras	6	6

Quarterfinals
(France) A Müller	0	2
2	(Spain) A Menéndez Maceiras	6	6
