= 2017 San Luis Open Challenger Tour – Doubles =

Doubles
- 2017 San Luis Open Challenger Tour

Final
- Champions: (Ecuador) Roberto Quiroz; (Brazil) Caio Zampieri
- Runners-up: (Mexico) Hans Hach Verdugo; (Spain) Adrián Menéndez Maceiras
- Score: 6–4, 6–2

Events
Singles	Doubles
- San Luis Open Challenger Tour

Marcus Daniell and Artem Sitak were the defending champions but chose not to defend their title.

Roberto Quiroz and Caio Zampieri won the title after defeating Hans Hach Verdugo and Adrián Menéndez Maceiras 6–4, 6–2 in the final.

== Seeds ==
1. (El Salvador) Marcelo Arévalo / (Uruguay) Marcel Felder (semifinals)
2. (United States) Evan King / (United States) Max Schnur (semifinals)
3. (Ecuador) Roberto Quiroz / (Brazil) Caio Zampieri (champions)
4. (Switzerland) Luca Margaroli / (Egypt) Mohamed Safwat (first round)

== Draw ==
Key

- Q = Qualifier
- WC = Wild card
- LL = Lucky loser
- Alt = Alternate
- ITF = ITF entry
- PR = Protected ranking
- SR = Special ranking
- SE = Special exempt
- JE = Junior exempt
- JR = Junior Accelerator Programme entrant
- CO = College Accelerator Programme entrant
- NG = Next Gen Accelerator Program entrant
- w/o = Walkover
- r = Retired
- d = Defaulted

First round

Quarterfinals

Semifinals

Final

1
- (El Salvador) M Arévalo
- (Uruguay) M Felder
6
6

- (Serbia) P Krstin
- (Serbia) A Zlatanović

WC
- (Venezuela) LD Martínez
- (Mexico) L Patiño
4
1

WC
- (Venezuela) LD Martínez
- (Mexico) L Patiño
w/o

1
- (El Salvador) M Arévalo
- (Uruguay) M Felder
6
2
[8]

4
- (Switzerland) L Margaroli
- (Egypt) M Safwat
6
3
[5]

- (Mexico) H Hach Verdugo
- (Spain) A Menéndez Maceiras
2
6
[10]

- (Mexico) H Hach Verdugo
- (Spain) A Menéndez Maceiras
3
6
[10]

- (Mexico) H Hach Verdugo
- (Spain) A Menéndez Maceiras
6
6

- (Argentina) F Argüello
- (Argentina) T Lipovšek Puches
6^{5}
6
[7]

- (Peru) S Galdós
- (Argentina) JI Londero
2
2

- (Peru) S Galdós
- (Argentina) JI Londero
7^{7}
4
[10]

- (Mexico) H Hach Verdugo
- (Spain) A Menéndez Maceiras
4
2

WC
(Mexico) Carlos de la Peña
(Mexico) David Koch
2
1

3
- (Ecuador) R Quiroz
- (Brazil) C Zampieri
6
6

- (United States) A El Mihdawy
- (Ecuador) I Endara
6
6

- (United States) A El Mihdawy
- (Ecuador) I Endara
3
1

- (Dominican Republic) R Cid Subervi
- (Colombia) DE Galán
1
2

3
- (Ecuador) R Quiroz
- (Brazil) C Zampieri
6
6

3
- (Ecuador) R Quiroz
- (Brazil) C Zampieri
6
6

3
- (Ecuador) R Quiroz
- (Brazil) C Zampieri
6
6

WC
- (Mexico) T Hank
- (Mexico) M Sánchez
6
5
[8]

2
- (United States) E King
- (United States) M Schnur
4
3

- (Brazil) F de Paula
- (Argentina) A Velotti
3
7
[10]

- (Brazil) F de Paula
- (Argentina) A Velotti

- (Chile) H Podlipnik Castillo
- (Serbia) M Zekić
3
4

2
- (United States) E King
- (United States) M Schnur
w/o

2
- (United States) E King
- (United States) M Schnur
6
6
