= 2014 San Luis Potosí Challenger – Doubles =

Doubles
- 2014 San Luis Potosí Challenger

Final
- Champions: (United States) Kevin King (Colombia) Juan Carlos Spir
- Runners-up: (Spain) Adrián Menéndez-Maceiras (Argentina) Agustín Velotti
- Score: 6–3, 6–4

Events
Singles	Doubles
- San Luis Potosí Challenger

Marin Draganja and Adrián Menéndez-Maceiras are the defending champions, but Marin Draganja chose not to compete. Adrián Menéndez-Maceiras played alongside Agustín Velotti.

Kevin King and Juan Carlos Spir won the title, defeating Adrián Menéndez-Maceiras and Agustín Velotti in the final, 6–3, 6–4.

== Seeds ==
1. (El Salvador) Marcelo Arévalo / (Colombia) Nicolás Barrientos (quarterfinals)
2. (United States) Kevin King / (Colombia) Juan Carlos Spir (champions)
3. (Mexico) César Ramírez / (Mexico) Miguel Ángel Reyes-Varela (quarterfinals)
4. (Spain) Adrián Menéndez-Maceiras / (Argentina) Agustín Velotti (final)

== Draw ==
Key

- Q = Qualifier
- WC = Wild card
- LL = Lucky loser
- Alt = Alternate
- ITF = ITF entry
- PR = Protected ranking
- SR = Special ranking
- SE = Special exempt
- JE = Junior exempt
- JR = Junior Accelerator Programme entrant
- CO = College Accelerator Programme entrant
- NG = Next Gen Accelerator Program entrant
- w/o = Walkover
- r = Retired
- d = Defaulted

=== Main draw ===
First round
1	(El Salvador) M Arévalo (Colombia) N Barrientos	6	6
WC	(Mexico) MG Valles (Mexico) Alan Núñez Aguilera	2	3
WC	(Mexico) L Gómez (Mexico) Andrés Zepeda	6^{4}	2
(United States) E King (Bulgaria) D Kutrovsky	7^{7}	6
4	(Spain) A Menéndez-Maceiras (Argentina) A Velotti	7	4	[11]
(Guatemala) CD Figueroa (Dominican Republic) VE Burgos	5	6	[9]
(Germany) N Langer (Germany) P Torebko	2	6	[9]
WC	(Mexico) T Hank (Mexico) M Sánchez	6	3	[11]
(Italy) Erik Crepaldi (Venezuela) LD Martínez	4	2
(United States) C Buchanan (United States) N Meister	6	6
(Italy) A di Mauro (Spain) DM de la Nava	4	0
3	(Mexico) C Ramírez (Mexico) MA Reyes-Verela	6	6
(Ecuador) I Endara (Barbados) D King	6	6
PR	(United States) Adham El-Effendi (United Kingdom) D Walsh	3	3
(United States) A El Mihdawy (Australia) Chris Letcher	3	4
2	(United States) K King (Colombia) JC Spir	6	6

Quarterfinals
1	(El Salvador) M Arévalo (Colombia) N Barrientos	3	4
(United States) E King (Bulgaria) D Kutrovsky	6	6
4	(Spain) A Menéndez-Maceiras (Argentina) A Velotti	4	6	[12]
WC	(Mexico) T Hank (Mexico) M Sánchez	6	0	[10]
(United States) C Buchanan (United States) N Meister	4	7^{7}	[10]
3	(Mexico) C Ramírez (Mexico) MA Reyes-Verela	6	6^{5}	[6]
(Ecuador) I Endara (Barbados) D King	0	2
2	(United States) K King (Colombia) JC Spir	6	6

Semifinals
(United States) E King (Bulgaria) D Kutrovsky
4	(Spain) A Menéndez-Maceiras (Argentina) A Velotti	w/o
(United States) C Buchanan (United States) N Meister	1	6^{5}
2	(United States) K King (Colombia) JC Spir	6	7^{7}

Final
4	(Spain) A Menéndez-Maceiras (Argentina) A Velotti	3	4
2	(United States) K King (Colombia) JC Spir	6	6
