= 2013 San Luis Open Challenger =

- Date: 25–31 March
- Edition: 20th
- Draw: 32S / 16D
- Prize money: $35,000+H
- Surface: Clay
- Location: San Luis Potosí, Mexico

Champions

Singles
- (Italy) Alessio di Mauro

Doubles
- (Croatia) Marin Draganja / (Spain) Adrián Menéndez Maceiras
- San Luis Open Challenger

The 2013 San Luis Open Challenger was a professional tennis tournament played on clay courts. It was the 20th edition of the tournament which was part of the 2013 ATP Challenger Tour. It took place in San Luis Potosí, Mexico between 25 and 31 March 2013.

== Singles main draw entrants ==
=== Seeds ===
Country	Player	Rank^{1}	Seed
AUS	John Millman	130	1
FRA	Jonathan Dasnières de Veigy	147	2
ARG	Diego Sebastián Schwartzman	149	3
SUI	Marco Chiudinelli	151	4
TUN	Malek Jaziri	163	5
GER	Peter Gojowczyk	170	6
SVK	Andrej Martin	173	7
ARG	Agustín Velotti	182	8

- ^{1} Rankings are as of March 18, 2013.

=== Other entrants ===
The following players received wildcards into the singles main draw:

- (Mexico) Miguel Gallardo Valles
- (Mexico) Daniel Garza
- (Chile) Nicolás Massú
- (Mexico) Manuel Sánchez

The following players received entry as an alternate into the singles main draw:

- (Spain) Adrián Menéndez Maceiras

The following players received entry from the qualifying draw:

- (El Salvador) Marcelo Arévalo
- (Italy) Alessio di Mauro
- (Guatemala) Christopher Díaz Figueroa
- (Philippines) Ruben Gonzales

== Doubles main draw entrants ==
=== Seeds ===
Country	Player	Country	Player	Rank^{1}	Seed
IND	Purav Raja	IND	Divij Sharan	246	1
TPE	Lee Hsin-han	TPE	Peng Hsien-yin	258	2
BRA	Marcelo Demoliner	CRO	Franco Škugor	276	3
CRO	Marin Draganja	ESP	Adrián Menéndez Maceiras	307	4

- ^{1} Rankings as of March 18, 2013.

=== Other entrants ===
The following pairs received wildcards into the doubles main draw:

- (Mexico) Miguel Gallardo Valles / (Chile) Nicolás Massú
- (Mexico) Daniel Garza / (Mexico) Miguel Ángel Reyes-Varela
- (Italy) Riccardo Ghedin / (Mexico) Manuel Sánchez

== Champions ==
=== Singles ===
- (Italy) Alessio di Mauro def. (United States) Daniel Kosakowski, 4–6, 6–3, 6–2

=== Doubles ===
- (Croatia) Marin Draganja / (Spain) Adrián Menéndez Maceiras def. (Switzerland) Marco Chiudinelli / (Germany) Peter Gojowczyk, 6–4, 6–3
