= 2018 San Luis Open Challenger Tour – Doubles =

Doubles
- 2018 San Luis Open Challenger Tour

Final
- Champions: (El Salvador) Marcelo Arévalo (Mexico) Miguel Ángel Reyes-Varela
- Runners-up: (United Kingdom) Jay Clarke (Germany) Kevin Krawietz
- Score: 6–1, 6–4

Events
Singles	Doubles
- San Luis Open Challenger Tour

Roberto Quiroz and Caio Zampieri were the defending champions but only Quiroz chose to defend his title, partnering Yannick Hanfmann. Quiroz lost in the quarterfinals to Jay Clarke and Kevin Krawietz.

Marcelo Arévalo and Miguel Ángel Reyes-Varela won the title after defeating Clarke and Krawietz 6–1, 6–4 in the final.

== Seeds ==
1. (United States) Austin Krajicek / (United States) Jackson Withrow (semifinals)
2. (El Salvador) Marcelo Arévalo / (Mexico) Miguel Ángel Reyes-Varela (champions)
3. (Argentina) Franco Agamenone / (Peru) Sergio Galdós (quarterfinals)
4. (United States) Evan King / (United States) Nathan Pasha (first round)

== Draw ==
Key

- Q = Qualifier
- WC = Wild card
- LL = Lucky loser
- Alt = Alternate
- ITF = ITF entry
- PR = Protected ranking
- SR = Special ranking
- SE = Special exempt
- JE = Junior exempt
- JR = Junior Accelerator Programme entrant
- CO = College Accelerator Programme entrant
- NG = Next Gen Accelerator Program entrant
- w/o = Walkover
- r = Retired
- d = Defaulted

First round
1	(United States) A Krajicek (United States) J Withrow	6	6
Alt	(Brazil) P Sakamoto (Brazil) JP Sorgi	4	4
(Serbia) P Krstin (Spain) D Muñoz de la Nava	7	6
(Argentina) A Collarini (Argentina) F Coria	5	2
4	(United States) E King (United States) N Pasha	6^{4}	7^{7}	[6]
(Germany) Y Hanfmann (Ecuador) R Quiroz	7^{7}	6^{3}	[10]
WC	(Colombia) A Gómez (Mexico) T Hank	4	1
(United Kingdom) J Clarke (Germany) K Krawietz	6	6
(Bolivia) B Arias (Bolivia) F Zeballos	4	7^{7}	[10]
(Argentina) F Argüello (Argentina) F Bagnis	6	6^{5}	[4]
WC	(Ecuador) E Gómez (Mexico) L Gómez	1	4
3	(Argentina) F Agamenone (Peru) S Galdós	6	6
WC	(Mexico) G López Villaseñor (Mexico) M Sánchez	7^{7}	6
(Venezuela) LD Martínez (New Zealand) R Statham	6^{1}	4
(United States) M Krueger (United States) A Sarkissian	1	3
2	(El Salvador) M Arévalo (Mexico) MÁ Reyes-Varela	6	6

Quarterfinals
1	(United States) A Krajicek (United States) J Withrow	w/o
(Serbia) P Krstin (Spain) D Muñoz de la Nava
(Germany) Y Hanfmann (Ecuador) R Quiroz	6^{5}	6	[5]
(United Kingdom) J Clarke (Germany) K Krawietz	7^{7}	3	[10]
(Bolivia) B Arias (Bolivia) F Zeballos	6	6
3	(Argentina) F Agamenone (Peru) S Galdós	3	4
WC	(Mexico) G López Villaseñor (Mexico) M Sánchez	5	6^{4}
2	(El Salvador) M Arévalo (Mexico) MÁ Reyes-Varela	7	7^{7}

Semifinals
1	(United States) A Krajicek (United States) J Withrow	3	4
(United Kingdom) J Clarke (Germany) K Krawietz	6	6
(Bolivia) B Arias (Bolivia) F Zeballos	4	4
2	(El Salvador) M Arévalo (Mexico) MÁ Reyes-Varela	6	6

Final
(United Kingdom) J Clarke (Germany) K Krawietz	1	4
2	(El Salvador) M Arévalo (Mexico) MÁ Reyes-Varela	6	6
