= 2014 Indore Open ATP Challenger – Doubles =

Doubles
- 2014 Indore Open ATP Challenger

Final
- Champion: (Spain) Adrián Menéndez-Maceiras (Kazakhstan) Aleksandr Nedovyesov
- Runner-up: (India) Yuki Bhambri (India) Divij Sharan
- Score: 2–6, 6–4, [10–3]

Events
Singles	Doubles
Indore Open ATP Challenger

This was the first edition of the tournament.

Adrián Menéndez-Maceiras and Aleksandr Nedovyesov won the title by defeating Yuki Bhambri and Divij Sharan 2–6, 6–4, [10–3] in the final.

== Seeds ==
1. (Thailand) Sanchai Ratiwatana / (Thailand) Sonchat Ratiwatana (first round)
2. (India) Yuki Bhambri / (India) Divij Sharan (final)
3. (Philippines) Ruben Gonzales / (India) Purav Raja (quarterfinals)
4. (Chinese Taipei) Chen Ti / (Chinese Taipei) Huang Liang-chi (first round)

== Draw ==
=== Key ===
- Q = Qualifier
- WC = Wild card
- LL = Lucky loser
- Alt = Alternate
- SE = Special exempt
- PR = Protected ranking
- ITF = ITF entry
- JE = Junior exempt
- w/o = Walkover
- r = Retired
- d = Defaulted
- SR = Special ranking

=== Draw ===
First round
1	(Thailand) Sa Ratiwatana (Thailand) So Ratiwatana	6	4	[7]
(India) S Devvarman (India) J Nedunchezhiyan	4	6	[10]
WC	(India) Bhavesh Gaur (India) Aaditya Tewari	3	3
(India) S Myneni (India) S Singh	6	6
4	(Chinese Taipei) T Chen (Chinese Taipei) L-c Huang	6	5	[8]
(Spain) A Menéndez-Maceiras (Kazakhstan) A Nedovyesov	3	7	[10]
(Chinese Taipei) H-h Lee (Thailand) D Udomchoke	3	6	[10]
WC	(India) Vinayak Sharma Kaza (India) Vignesh Peranamallur	6	1	[6]
(India) S Balaji (India) R Virali-Murugesan	3	1
WC	(India) R Ramanathan (India) V Vardhan	6	6
(Russia) A Kudryavtsev (Italy) G Quinzi	1^{r}
3	(Philippines) R Gonzales (India) P Raja	1
(Belgium) G Gigounon (France) F Martin	4	4
(Japan) H Moriya (Japan) Y Uchiyama	6	6
(Italy) R Ghedin (Italy) S Travaglia	4	4
2	(India) Y Bhambri (India) D Sharan	6	6

Quarterfinals
(India) S Devvarman (India) J Nedunchezhiyan	6	7^{7}
(India) S Myneni (India) S Singh	3	6^{4}
(Spain) A Menéndez-Maceiras (Kazakhstan) A Nedovyesov	6	6
(Chinese Taipei) H-h Lee (Thailand) D Udomchoke	3	1
WC	(India) R Ramanathan (India) V Vardhan	6	3	[10]
3	(Philippines) R Gonzales (India) P Raja	4	6	[8]
(Japan) H Moriya (Japan) Y Uchiyama	6^{4}	2
2	(India) Y Bhambri (India) D Sharan	7^{7}	6

Semifinals
(India) S Devvarman (India) J Nedunchezhiyan	1	3
(Spain) A Menéndez-Maceiras (Kazakhstan) A Nedovyesov	6	6
WC	(India) R Ramanathan (India) V Vardhan
2	(India) Y Bhambri (India) D Sharan	w/o

Final
(Spain) A Menéndez-Maceiras (Kazakhstan) A Nedovyesov	2	6	[10]
2	(India) Y Bhambri (India) D Sharan	6	4	[3]
