= 2009 San Luis Potosí Challenger – Singles =

Singles
- 2009 San Luis Potosí Challenger

Final
- Champion: (Colombia) Santiago Giraldo
- Runner-up: (Italy) Paolo Lorenzi
- Score: 6–2, 6–7(3), 6–2

Events
Singles	Doubles
- San Luis Potosí Challenger

Brian Dabul chose to not defend his 2008 title.
Santiago Giraldo defeated Paolo Lorenzi in the final 6–2, 6–7(3), 6–2.

== Seeds ==
1. (Argentina) Horacio Zeballos (quarterfinals)
2. (Colombia) Santiago Giraldo (champion)
3. (Brazil) Franco Ferreiro (quarterfinals)
4. (Argentina) Mariano Puerta (semifinals)
5. (Colombia) Alejandro Falla (first round)
6. (Switzerland) Michael Lammer (second round)
7. (Mexico) Santiago González (semifinals)
8. (Italy) Paolo Lorenzi (final)

== Draw ==
Key

- Q = Qualifier
- WC = Wild card
- LL = Lucky loser
- Alt = Alternate
- ITF = ITF entry
- PR = Protected ranking
- SR = Special ranking
- SE = Special exempt
- JE = Junior exempt
- JR = Junior Accelerator Programme entrant
- CO = College Accelerator Programme entrant
- NG = Next Gen Accelerator Program entrant
- w/o = Walkover
- r = Retired
- d = Defaulted

=== Final four ===
Semifinals
8	(Italy) Paolo Lorenzi	6	6
7	(Mexico) Santiago González	2	3
4/WC	(Argentina) Mariano Puerta	3	2
2	(Colombia) Santiago Giraldo	6	6

Final
8	(Italy) Paolo Lorenzi	2	7	2
2	(Colombia) Santiago Giraldo	6	6^{3}	6

=== Top half ===
First round
1	(Argentina) H Zeballos	7	7
(Japan) J Mitsuhashi	6^{4}	6^{5}
(United Kingdom) J Ward	6	3	6
(Brazil) J Souza	3	6	3
(Colombia) M Quintero	3	6	7
WC	(Mexico) M Sánchez	6	4	6^{5}
(Italy) R Ghedin	1	6	4
8	(Italy) P Lorenzi	6	4	6
3	(Brazil) F Ferreiro	7	6
(Slovenia) B Kavčič	5	4
(Colombia) C Salamanca	6	6
WC	(Argentina) M Zabaleta	3	4
(Belgium) N Desein	6	3	1
(Uruguay) M Felder	1	6	6
(Australia) C Ebelthite	2	2
7	(Mexico) S González	6	6

Second round
1	(Argentina) H Zeballos	6	6
(United Kingdom) J Ward	0	3
(Colombia) M Quintero	2	1
8	(Italy) P Lorenzi	6	6
3	(Brazil) F Ferreiro	6	6
(Colombia) C Salamanca	4	3
(Uruguay) M Felder	2	2
7	(Mexico) S González	6	6

Quarterfinals
1	(Argentina) H Zeballos	4	2
8	(Italy) P Lorenzi	6	6
3	(Brazil) F Ferreiro	6^{7}	0
7	(Mexico) S González	7	6

Semifinals
8	(Italy) P Lorenzi	6	6
7	(Mexico) S González	2	3

=== Bottom half ===
First round
5	(Colombia) A Falla	3	5
Q	(Colombia) A González	6	7
(Dominican Republic) V Estrella	6	6^{5}	6
(Brazil) A Miele	4	7	3
(Spain) G Alcaide	2	6^{4}
WC	(Mexico) LM Flores	6	7
(Brazil) J Silva	6^{5}	3
4/WC	(Argentina) M Puerta	7	6
6	(Switzerland) M Lammer	6	7
Q	(France) V Millot	2	6^{1}
(Austria) R Eitzinger	7	6
(Poland) D Olejniczak	5	0
(Mexico) B Echagaray	6	6
Q	(Colombia) JS Cabal	4	4
Q	(Ecuador) JC Campozano	5	2
2	(Colombia) S Giraldo	7	6

Second round
Q	(Colombia) A González	2	6^{5}
(Dominican Republic) V Estrella	6	7
WC	(Mexico) LM Flores	3	1
4/WC	(Argentina) M Puerta	6	6
6	(Switzerland) M Lammer	5	1
(Austria) R Eitzinger	7	6
(Mexico) B Echagaray	w/o
2	(Colombia) S Giraldo

Quarterfinals
(Dominican Republic) V Estrella	6^{5}	3
4/WC	(Argentina) M Puerta	7	6
(Austria) R Eitzinger	4	2
2	(Colombia) S Giraldo	6	6

Semifinals
4/WC	(Argentina) M Puerta	3	2
2	(Colombia) S Giraldo	6	6
