= 2014 Indore Open ATP Challenger =

- Date: 13 October–18 October
- Edition: 1st
- Category: ATP Challenger Tour (men)
- Prize money: $50,000
- Surface: Hard
- Location: Indore, India

Champions

Singles
- (India) Saketh Myneni

Doubles
- (Spain) Adrián Menéndez-Maceiras / (Kazakhstan) Aleksandr Nedovyesov
Indore Open ATP Challenger

The 2014 Indore Open ATP Challenger was a professional tennis tournament played on outdoor hard courts. It was the first and only edition of the tournament for the men. It was part of the 2014 ATP Challenger Tour. It took place in Indore, India, on 13 October to 18 October 2014.

== Singles main draw entrants ==
=== Seeds ===
Country	Player	Rank^{1}	Seed
KAZ	Aleksandr Nedovyesov	121	1
RUS	Alexander Kudryavtsev	129	2
IND	Somdev Devvarman	142	3
JPN	Hiroki Moriya	157	4
ESP	Adrián Menéndez-Maceiras	163	5
IND	Yuki Bhambri	184	6
BEL	Kimmer Coppejans	193	7
ITA	Stefano Travaglia	215	8

- ^{1} Rankings as of 6 October 2014

=== Other entrants ===
The following players received wildcards into the singles main draw:

- (India) Sidharth Rawat
- (India) Vishnu Vardhan
- (India) Sasikumar Mukund
- (India) Ronit Singh Bisht

The following players received entry from the qualifying draw:

- (India) Vijay Sundar Prashanth
- (India) Lakshit Sood
- (Italy) Riccardo Ghedin
- (India) Ranjeet Virali-Murugesan

== Champions ==
=== Singles ===
- (India) Saketh Myneni def. (Kazakhstan) Aleksandr Nedovyesov, 6–3, 6–7^{(4–7)}, 6–3

=== Doubles ===
- (Spain) Adrián Menéndez-Maceiras / (Kazakhstan) Aleksandr Nedovyesov def. (India) Yuki Bhambri / (India) Divij Sharan, 2–6, 6–4, [10–3]
