= 2017 San Luis Open Challenger Tour =

- Date: 10 – 16 April
- Edition: 24th
- Draw: 32S / 16D
- Prize money: $50,000+H
- Surface: Clay
- Location: San Luis Potosí, Mexico

Champions

Singles
- (Slovakia) Andrej Martin

Doubles
- (Ecuador) Roberto Quiroz / (Brazil) Caio Zampieri
- San Luis Open Challenger Tour

The 2017 San Luis Open Challenger Tour was a professional tennis tournament played on hard courts. It was the 24th edition of the tournament which was part of the 2017 ATP Challenger Tour. It took place in San Luis Potosí, Mexico between 10 and 16 March 2017.

== Point distribution ==
Event	W	F	SF	QF	Round of 16	Round of 32	Q	Q2
Singles	80	48	29	15	7	0	3	0
Doubles	80	48	29	15	0	—N/a	—N/a	—N/a

== Singles main-draw entrants ==
=== Seeds ===
Country	Player	Rank^{1}	Seed
ARG	Facundo Bagnis	100	1
AUT	Gerald Melzer	109	2
USA	Stefan Kozlov	120	3
BRA	João Souza	140	4
SVK	Andrej Martin	155	5
EGY	Mohamed Safwat	202	6
ESA	Marcelo Arévalo	208	7
ESP	Adrián Menéndez Maceiras	210	8

- ^{1} Rankings are as of April 3, 2017.

=== Other entrants ===
The following players received wildcards into the singles main draw:

- (Argentina) Facundo Bagnis
- (Mexico) Tigre Hank
- (Serbia) Miomir Kecmanović
- (Mexico) Manuel Sánchez

The following players received entry from the qualifying draw:

- (Argentina) Facundo Argüello
- (Dominican Republic) Roberto Cid Subervi
- (Mexico) Carlos de la Peña
- (Uruguay) Marcel Felder

The following player received entry as a lucky loser:

- (Switzerland) Luca Margaroli

== Champions ==
=== Singles ===
- (Slovakia) Andrej Martin def. (Spain) Adrián Menéndez Maceiras 7–5, 6–4.

=== Doubles ===
- (Ecuador) Roberto Quiroz / (Brazil) Caio Zampieri def. (Mexico) Hans Hach Verdugo / (Spain) Adrián Menéndez Maceiras 6–4, 6–2.
