= 2015 San Luis Open Challenger Tour =

- Date: 31 March – 5 April
- Edition: 22nd
- Draw: 32S / 16D
- Prize money: $50,000+H
- Surface: Clay
- Location: San Luis Potosí, Mexico

Champions

Singles
- (Argentina) Guido Pella

Doubles
- (Argentina) Guillermo Durán / (Argentina) Horacio Zeballos
- San Luis Open Challenger Tour

The 2015 San Luis Open Challenger Tour was a professional tennis tournament played on hard courts. It was the 22nd edition of the tournament which was part of the 2015 ATP Challenger Tour. It took place in San Luis Potosí, Mexico between 31 March and 5 April.

== Singles main-draw entrants ==
=== Seeds ===
Country	Player	Rank^{1}	Seed
RUS	Teymuraz Gabashvili	80	1
ITA	Paolo Lorenzi	87	2
BIH	Damir Džumhur	92	3
AUS	James Duckworth	97	4
ITA	~~Luca Vanni~~	~~115~~	~~5~~
ESP	Adrián Menéndez Maceiras	126	6
USA	Austin Krajicek	146	7
ARG	Horacio Zeballos	148	8

- ^{1} Rankings are as of March 23, 2015

=== Other entrants ===
The following players received wildcards into the singles main draw:

- (Mexico) Mauricio Astorga
- (Mexico) Daniel Garza
- (Mexico) Manuel Sánchez
- (Mexico) Tigre Hank

The following players received entry from the qualifying draw:

- (Brazil) Caio Zampieri
- (Colombia) Eduardo Struvay
- (Ecuador) Iván Endara
- (Colombia) Juan Sebastián Gómez

The following player received entry as a lucky loser:

- (Ecuador) Giovanni Lapentti

The following player received entry as an alternate:

- (Argentina) Andrés Molteni

== Champions ==
=== Singles ===
- (Argentina) Guido Pella def. (Republic of Ireland) James McGee, 6–3, 6–3

=== Doubles ===
- (Argentina) Guillermo Durán / (Argentina) Horacio Zeballos def. (Peru) Sergio Galdós / (Argentina) Guido Pella, 7–6^{(7–4)}, 6–4
