= 2009 San Luis Potosí Challenger – Doubles =

Doubles
- 2009 San Luis Potosí Challenger

Final
- Champions: (Mexico) Santiago González (Argentina) Horacio Zeballos
- Runners-up: (Brazil) Franco Ferreiro (Brazil) Júlio Silva
- Score: 6–2, 7–6^{(7–5)}

Events
Singles	Doubles
- San Luis Potosí Challenger

Travis Parrott and Filip Polášek were the defending champions; however, they didn't participate this year.
Santiago González and Horacio Zeballos won in the final 6–2, 7–6(5), against Franco Ferreiro and Júlio Silva.

== Seeds ==
1. (Mexico) Santiago González / (Argentina) Horacio Zeballos (champions)
2. (Brazil) Franco Ferreiro / (Brazil) Júlio Silva (final)
3. (Colombia) Alejandro Falla / (Colombia) Santiago Giraldo (semifinals)
4. (Colombia) Juan Sebastián Cabal / (Poland) Dawid Olejniczak (quarterfinals)

== Draw ==
Key

- Q = Qualifier
- WC = Wild card
- LL = Lucky loser
- Alt = Alternate
- ITF = ITF entry
- PR = Protected ranking
- SR = Special ranking
- SE = Special exempt
- JE = Junior exempt
- JR = Junior Accelerator Programme entrant
- CO = College Accelerator Programme entrant
- NG = Next Gen Accelerator Program entrant
- w/o = Walkover
- r = Retired
- d = Defaulted

=== Draw ===
First round
1	(Mexico) S González (Argentina) H Zeballos	7	6
(Dominican Republic) V Estrella (Brazil) J Souza	5	3
(Colombia) A González (Colombia) E Struvay	6	4	[10]
WC	(Mexico) D Garza (Colombia) M Quintero	4	6	[8]
3	(Colombia) A Falla (Colombia) S Giraldo	7	6
(Brazil) A Miele (Colombia) C Salamanca	5	4
(Belgium) N Desein (United Kingdom) J Ward	6	3	[8]
WC	(Switzerland) A Sadecky (Mexico) M Sánchez	2	6	[10]
(Mexico) B Echagaray (Uruguay) M Felder	w/o
(Austria) R Eitzinger (Switzerland) M Lammer
(Italy) R Ghedin (Italy) P Lorenzi	7	4	[4]
4	(Colombia) JS Cabal (Poland) D Olejniczak	6^{5}	6	[10]
WC	(Mexico) J-M Elisondo (Mexico) C Ramírez	7	4	[13]
(Ecuador) JC Campozano (Slovenia) B Kavčič	5	6	[11]
(Australia) C Ebelthite (Japan) J Mitsuhashi	7	3	[8]
2	(Brazil) F Ferreiro (Brazil) J Silva	6^{11}	6	[10]

Quarterfinals
1	(Mexico) S González (Argentina) H Zeballos	7	3	[10]
(Colombia) A González (Colombia) E Struvay	6^{6}	6	[6]
3	(Colombia) A Falla (Colombia) S Giraldo	6	2	[10]
WC	(Switzerland) A Sadecky (Mexico) M Sánchez	4	6	[5]
(Austria) R Eitzinger (Switzerland) M Lammer	7	3	[10]
4	(Colombia) JS Cabal (Poland) D Olejniczak	6^{3}	6	[8]
WC	(Mexico) J-M Elisondo (Mexico) C Ramírez	6	4	[9]
2	(Brazil) F Ferreiro (Brazil) J Silva	2	6	[11]

Semifinals
1	(Mexico) S González (Argentina) H Zeballos	6	6
3	(Colombia) A Falla (Colombia) S Giraldo	3	3
(Austria) R Eitzinger (Switzerland) M Lammer	4	7	[6]
2	(Brazil) F Ferreiro (Brazil) J Silva	6	5	[10]

Finals
1	(Mexico) S González (Argentina) H Zeballos	6	7
2	(Brazil) F Ferreiro (Brazil) J Silva	2	6^{5}
