= 2018 San Luis Open Challenger Tour – Singles =

Singles
- 2018 San Luis Open Challenger Tour

Final
- Champion: (El Salvador) Marcelo Arévalo
- Runner-up: (Dominican Republic) Roberto Cid Subervi
- Score: 6–3, 6–7^{(3–7)}, 6–4

Events
Singles	Doubles
- San Luis Open Challenger Tour

Andrej Martin was the defending champion but chose not to defend his title.

Marcelo Arévalo won the title after defeating Roberto Cid Subervi 6–3, 6–7^{(3–7)}, 6–4 in the final.

== Seeds ==
1. (Italy) Paolo Lorenzi (first round)
2. (Austria) Gerald Melzer (first round, retired)
3. (Germany) Yannick Hanfmann (second round)
4. (Brazil) Thomaz Bellucci (second round)
5. (Dominican Republic) Víctor Estrella Burgos (first round)
6. (United States) Evan King (first round)
7. (United States) Mitchell Krueger (first round)
8. (Serbia) Peđa Krstin (second round)

== Draw ==
Key

- Q = Qualifier
- WC = Wild card
- LL = Lucky loser
- Alt = Alternate
- ITF = ITF entry
- PR = Protected ranking
- SR = Special ranking
- SE = Special exempt
- JE = Junior exempt
- JR = Junior Accelerator Programme entrant
- CO = College Accelerator Programme entrant
- NG = Next Gen Accelerator Program entrant
- w/o = Walkover
- r = Retired
- d = Defaulted

=== Finals ===
Semifinals
Q	(Dominican Republic) Roberto Cid Subervi	6	6
Q	(Brazil) Pedro Sakamoto	3	3
(Colombia) Daniel Elahi Galán	6	4	3
(El Salvador) Marcelo Arévalo	4	6	6

Final
Q	(Dominican Republic) Roberto Cid Subervi	3	7^{7}	4
(El Salvador) Marcelo Arévalo	6	6^{3}	6

=== Top half ===
First round
1	(Italy) P Lorenzi	7^{7}	1	3
(United States) A Krajicek	6^{2}	6	6
(Argentina) F Argüello	3	3
(Dominican Republic) J Hernández-Fernández	6	6
Q	(Dominican Republic) R Cid Subervi	6	6
(United States) A Sarkissian	2	0
(Argentina) F Bagnis	6	1	6
7	(United States) M Krueger	1	6	3
3	(Germany) Y Hanfmann	1	7	6
(Ecuador) R Quiroz	6	5	3
(United Kingdom) J Clarke	6	2	6
WC	(Mexico) T Hank	2	6	2
(Argentina) F Coria	3	4
Q	(Brazil) P Sakamoto	6	6
WC	(Mexico) G López Villaseñor	2	3
8	(Serbia) P Krstin	6	6

Second round
(United States) A Krajicek	0	2
(Dominican Republic) J Hernández-Fernández	6	6
Q	(Dominican Republic) R Cid Subervi	6^{5}	7	6
(Argentina) F Bagnis	7^{7}	5	1
3	(Germany) Y Hanfmann	5	6	4
(United Kingdom) J Clarke	7	2	6
Q	(Brazil) P Sakamoto	4	6	7
8	(Serbia) P Krstin	6	3	5

Quarterfinals
(Dominican Republic) J Hernández-Fernández	6	3	4
Q	(Dominican Republic) R Cid Subervi	2	6	6
(United Kingdom) J Clarke	3	6^{4}
Q	(Brazil) P Sakamoto	6	7^{7}

Semifinals
Q	(Dominican Republic) R Cid Subervi	6	6
Q	(Brazil) P Sakamoto	3	3

=== Bottom half ===
First round
6	(United States) E King	3	3
(Colombia) A González	6	6
WC	(Mexico) L Gómez	3	6^{4}
Q	(Ecuador) G Escobar	6	7^{7}
(Colombia) DE Galán	6^{2}	7^{7}	7
(Brazil) J Souza	7^{7}	6^{4}	5
(Argentina) A Collarini	3	4
4	(Brazil) T Bellucci	6	6
5	(Dominican Republic) V Estrella Burgos	1	4
(El Salvador) M Arévalo	6	6
(Spain) D Muñoz de la Nava	6	7
Q	(Germany) K Krawietz	4	5
WC	(Mexico) M Sánchez	6	6
(Russia) I Nedelko	0	2
(Germany) J Choinski	6	3
2	(Austria) G Melzer	1	1^{r}

Second round
(Colombia) A González	3	4
Q	(Ecuador) G Escobar	6	6
(Colombia) DE Galán	6	6
4	(Brazil) T Bellucci	3	3
(El Salvador) M Arévalo	6	7^{7}
(Spain) D Muñoz de la Nava	3	6^{4}
WC	(Mexico) M Sánchez	4	5
(Germany) J Choinski	6	7

Quarterfinals
Q	(Ecuador) G Escobar	2	3
(Colombia) DE Galán	6	6
(El Salvador) M Arévalo	6	3	6
(Germany) J Choinski	2	6	3

Semifinals
(Colombia) DE Galán	6	4	3
(El Salvador) M Arévalo	4	6	6
