= 2014 San Luis Potosí Challenger – Singles =

Singles
- 2014 San Luis Potosí Challenger

Final
- Champion: (Italy) Paolo Lorenzi
- Runner-up: (Spain) Adrián Menéndez Maceiras
- Score: 6–1, 6–3

Events
Singles	Doubles
- San Luis Potosí Challenger

Alessio di Mauro was the defending champion, but lost in the quarterfinals to Víctor Estrella Burgos.

Paolo Lorenzi won the title, defeating Adrián Menéndez Maceiras in the final, 6–1, 6–3.

== Seeds ==
1. (Colombia) Alejandro Falla (first round)
2. (Italy) Paolo Lorenzi (champion)
3. (Dominican Republic) Víctor Estrella Burgos (semifinals)
4. (Spain) Adrián Menéndez Maceiras (final)
5. (Argentina) Agustín Velotti (quarterfinals)
6. (Spain) Daniel Muñoz de la Nava (second round)
7. (United States) Chase Buchanan (first round)
8. (United States) Nicolas Meister (first round)

== Draw ==
Key

- Q = Qualifier
- WC = Wild card
- LL = Lucky loser
- Alt = Alternate
- ITF = ITF entry
- PR = Protected ranking
- SR = Special ranking
- SE = Special exempt
- JE = Junior exempt
- JR = Junior Accelerator Programme entrant
- CO = College Accelerator Programme entrant
- NG = Next Gen Accelerator Program entrant
- w/o = Walkover
- r = Retired
- d = Defaulted

=== Finals ===
Semifinals
(El Salvador) Marcelo Arévalo	1	7^{9}	3^{r}
4	(Spain) Adrián Menéndez Maceiras	6	6^{7}	4
3	(Dominican Republic) Víctor Estrella Burgos	3	6^{1}
2	(Italy) Paolo Lorenzi	6	7^{7}

Final
4	(Spain) Adrián Menéndez Maceiras	1	3
2	(Italy) Paolo Lorenzi	6	6

=== Top half ===
First round
1	(Colombia) A Falla	2	6^{9}
WC	(Mexico) L Gómez	6	7^{11}
(El Salvador) M Arévalo	6	7^{7}
Q	(South Africa) D O'Brien	1	6^{4}
LL	(United States) E King	2	6^{6}
(Germany) N Langer	6	7^{8}
(United States) A El Mihdawy	2	3
6	(Spain) D Muñoz de la Nava	6	6
4	(Spain) A Menéndez Maceiras	7^{7}	6
(Guatemala) CD Figueroa	6^{3}	2
(Mexico) MA Reyes-Varela	3	3
(United States) K King	6	6
Q	(Mexico) C Ramírez	6	7
(Barbados) D King	4	5
(Colombia) N Barrientos	2	6	6
7	(United States) C Buchanan	6	2	2

Second round
WC	(Mexico) L Gómez	5	3
(El Salvador) M Arévalo	7	7
(Germany) N Langer	6	6
6	(Spain) D Muñoz de la Nava	4	4
4	(Spain) A Menéndez Maceiras	6	6
(United States) K King	4	3
Q	(Mexico) C Ramírez	4	4
(Colombia) N Barrientos	6	6

Quarterfinals
(El Salvador) M Arévalo	5	7	7
(Germany) N Langer	7	5	5
4	(Spain) A Menéndez Maceiras	7	6
(Colombia) N Barrientos	5	1

Semifinals
(El Salvador) M Arévalo	1	7^{9}	3^{r}
4	(Spain) A Menéndez Maceiras	6	6^{7}	4

=== Bottom half ===
First round
8	(United States) N Meister	3	4
(Italy) A di Mauro	6	6
(Australia) Chris Letcher	4	4
(Venezuela) LD Martínez	6	6
(Italy) Erik Crepaldi	3	5
(Ecuador) I Endara	6	7
WC	(Mexico) Alan Núñez	3	0
3	(Dominican Republic) V Estrella Burgos	6	6
5	(Argentina) A Velotti	6	6
(Colombia) JC Spir	2	2
WC	(Mexico) M Amador	4	3
WC	(Mexico) T Hank	6	6
(Germany) P Torebko	6	3	7
(Bulgaria) D Kutrovsky	3	6	5
Q	(Peru) M Echazú	3	2
2	(Italy) P Lorenzi	6	6

Second round
(Italy) A di Mauro	6	6
(Venezuela) LD Martínez	0	0
(Ecuador) I Endara	3	3
3	(Dominican Republic) V Estrella Burgos	6	6
5	(Argentina) A Velotti	6	7^{7}
WC	(Mexico) T Hank	4	6^{5}
(Germany) P Torebko	0	2
2	(Italy) P Lorenzi	6	6

Quarterfinals
(Italy) A di Mauro	3	6^{0}
3	(Dominican Republic) V Estrella Burgos	6	7^{7}
5	(Argentina) A Velotti	5	3
2	(Italy) P Lorenzi	7	6

Semifinals
3	(Dominican Republic) V Estrella Burgos	3	6^{1}
2	(Italy) P Lorenzi	6	7^{7}
