= 2012 San Luis Potosí Challenger – Singles =

Singles
- 2012 San Luis Potosí Challenger

Final
- Champion: (Spain) Rubén Ramírez Hidalgo
- Runner-up: (Italy) Paolo Lorenzi
- Score: 3–6, 6–3, 6–4

Events
Singles	Doubles
- San Luis Potosí Challenger

Santiago Giraldo was the defending champion but decided not to participate. Spanish Rubén Ramírez Hidalgo won the tournament with the score 3–6, 6–3, 6–4 in the final against Paolo Lorenzi.

== Seeds ==
1. (Italy) Paolo Lorenzi (final)
2. (Spain) Rubén Ramírez Hidalgo (champion)
3. (Spain) Arnau Brugués Davi (first round, retired)
4. (Italy) Matteo Viola (first round)
5. (Czech Republic) Jan Mertl (first round)
6. (Canada) Érik Chvojka (second round)
7. (Moldova) Roman Borvanov (first round)
8. (Colombia) Alejandro González (first round)

== Draw ==
Key

- Q = Qualifier
- WC = Wild card
- LL = Lucky loser
- Alt = Alternate
- ITF = ITF entry
- PR = Protected ranking
- SR = Special ranking
- SE = Special exempt
- JE = Junior exempt
- JR = Junior Accelerator Programme entrant
- CO = College Accelerator Programme entrant
- NG = Next Gen Accelerator Program entrant
- w/o = Walkover
- r = Retired
- d = Defaulted

=== Finals ===
Semifinals
1	(Italy) Paolo Lorenzi	6	6
(Italy) Riccardo Ghedin	3	4
(Argentina) Agustín Velotti	2	7	4
2	(Spain) Rubén Ramírez Hidalgo	6	5	6

Final
1	(Italy) Paolo Lorenzi	6	3	4
2	(Spain) Rubén Ramírez Hidalgo	3	6	6

=== Top half ===
First round
1	(Italy) P Lorenzi	6	6
(Argentina) S Decoud	2	1
(Chinese Taipei) T Chen	1	6^{1}
(Canada) S Diez	6	7^{7}
LL	(Brazil) Fabiano de Paula	6	0	6
WC	(Mexico) M Sánchez	3	6	2
WC	(Mexico) MA Reyes-Varela	6	4	3
6	(Canada) É Chvojka	4	6	6
3	(Spain) A Brugués Davi	1^{r}
Q	(United States) D Zivkovic	4
(Germany) A Begemann	5	6	6
Q	(Ecuador) JC Campozano	7	4	2
WC	(Mexico) Luis Patino	4	3
(Chile) C Saavedra-Corvalán	6	6
(Italy) R Ghedin	2	6	6
5	(Czech Republic) J Mertl	6	2	2

Second round
1	(Italy) P Lorenzi	6	3	6
(Canada) S Diez	0	6	1
LL	(Brazil) Fabiano de Paula	6	7^{7}
6	(Canada) É Chvojka	4	6^{4}
Q	(United States) D Zivkovic	6	6
(Germany) A Begemann	2	1
(Chile) C Saavedra Corvalán	2	7	4
(Italy) R Ghedin	6	5	6

Quarterfinals
1	(Italy) P Lorenzi	6	5	6
LL	(Brazil) Fabiano de Paula	0	7	2
Q	(United States) D Zivkovic	5	6	6^{4}
(Italy) R Ghedin	7	3	7^{7}

Semifinals
1	(Italy) P Lorenzi	6	6
(Italy) R Ghedin	3	4

=== Bottom half ===
First round
8	(Colombia) A González	3	4
(Brazil) M Demoliner	6	6
(Argentina) A Velotti	6	6
(Switzerland) M Lammer	4	3
(Argentina) A Molteni	6	6
(Chile) G Rivera Aránguiz	4	2
(Argentina) Marco Trungelliti	6	6
4	(Italy) M Viola	2	0
7	(Moldova) R Borvanov	4	7^{7}	4
(Brazil) G Clezar	6	6^{4}	6
(France) F Martin	6	2	6
(Italy) M Marrai	2	6	4
Q	(Slovakia) A Martin	6^{7}	6	6
WC	(Mexico) B Rodríguez	7^{9}	1	4
Q	(Peru) M Echazú	1	0
2	(Spain) R Ramírez Hidalgo	6	6

Second round
(Brazil) M Demoliner	6	3	1
(Argentina) A Velotti	4	6	6
(Argentina) A Molteni	3	1
(Argentina) Marco Trungelliti	6	6
(Brazil) G Clezar	7^{7}	3	6
(France) F Martin	6^{3}	6	2
Q	(Slovakia) A Martin	2	6	2
2	(Spain) R Ramírez Hidalgo	6	3	6

Quarterfinals
(Argentina) A Velotti	5	7^{7}	6
(Argentina) Marco Trungelliti	7	6^{3}	1
(Brazil) G Clezar	2	6	1
2	(Spain) R Ramírez Hidalgo	6	4	6

Semifinals
(Argentina) A Velotti	2	7	4
2	(Spain) R Ramírez Hidalgo	6	5	6
