= 2012 San Luis Potosí Challenger – Doubles =

Doubles
- 2012 San Luis Potosí Challenger

Final
- Champions: (United States) Nicholas Monroe (Germany) Simon Stadler
- Runners-up: (Germany) Andre Begemann (Australia) Jordan Kerr
- Score: 3–6, 7–5, [10–7]

Events
Singles	Doubles
- San Luis Potosí Challenger

Santiago González and Horacio Zeballos were the defending champions but decided not to participate.
Nicholas Monroe and Simon Stadler won the title, defeating Andre Begemann and Jordan Kerr 3–6, 7–5, [10–7] in the final.

== Seeds ==
1. (United States) James Cerretani / (United States) John Paul Fruttero (first round)
2. (Germany) Andre Begemann / (Australia) Jordan Kerr (final)
3. (United States) Nicholas Monroe / (Germany) Simon Stadler (champions)
4. (Australia) Colin Ebelthite / (Australia) Nima Roshan (first round)

== Draw ==
Key

- Q = Qualifier
- WC = Wild card
- LL = Lucky loser
- Alt = Alternate
- ITF = ITF entry
- PR = Protected ranking
- SR = Special ranking
- SE = Special exempt
- JE = Junior exempt
- JR = Junior Accelerator Programme entrant
- CO = College Accelerator Programme entrant
- NG = Next Gen Accelerator Program entrant
- w/o = Walkover
- r = Retired
- d = Defaulted

=== Draw ===
First round
1	(United States) J Cerretani (United States) JP Fruttero	5	1
(Moldova) R Borvanov (United States) D Zivkovic	7	6
(Ecuador) JC Campozano (Colombia) A González	2	7	[8]
(Argentina) S Decoud (Spain) R Ramírez Hidalgo	6	5	[10]
3	(United States) N Monroe (Germany) S Stadler	6	6
WC	(Italy) M Marrai (Mexico) M Sanchez	4	3
(Italy) R Ghedin (France) F Martin	6	6
Alt	(Brazil) M Demoliner (Argentina) Marco Trungelliti	4	4
(Canada) É Chvojka (Italy) M Viola	6	6
(Argentina) A Molteni (Chile) G Rivera-Aránguiz	2	3
WC	(Mexico) MA Reyes-Varela (Mexico) B Rodríguez	6	6
4	(Australia) C Ebelthite (Australia) Nima Roshan	1	4
(Czech Republic) R Jebavý (Czech Republic) J Mertl	5	3
WC	(Mexico) L Díaz-Barriga (Mexico) C Palencia	7	6
(Canada) S Diez (Chile) C Saavedra-Corvalán	3	5
2	(Germany) A Begemann (Australia) J Kerr	6	7

Quarterfinals
(Moldova) R Borvanov (United States) D Zivkovic	6	4	[6]
(Argentina) S Decoud (Spain) R Ramírez Hidalgo	3	6	[10]
3	(United States) N Monroe (Germany) S Stadler	6	6
(Italy) R Ghedin (France) F Martin	3	4
(Canada) É Chvojka (Italy) M Viola	6	6
WC	(Mexico) MA Reyes-Varela (Mexico) B Rodríguez	3	3
WC	(Mexico) L Díaz-Barriga (Mexico) C Palencia	2	3
2	(Germany) A Begemann (Australia) J Kerr	6	6

Semifinals
(Argentina) S Decoud (Spain) R Ramírez Hidalgo	4	2
3	(United States) N Monroe (Germany) S Stadler	6	6
(Canada) É Chvojka (Italy) M Viola	2	5
2	(Germany) A Begemann (Australia) J Kerr	6	7

Final
3	(United States) N Monroe (Germany) S Stadler	3	7	[10]
2	(Germany) A Begemann (Australia) J Kerr	6	5	[7]
