= 2019 San Luis Open Challenger Tour =

- Date: 15–21 April
- Edition: 26th
- Draw: 48S / 16D
- Surface: Clay
- Location: San Luis Potosí, Mexico

Champions

Singles
- (Switzerland) Marc-Andrea Hüsler

Doubles
- (El Salvador) Marcelo Arévalo / (Mexico) Miguel Ángel Reyes-Varela
- San Luis Open Challenger Tour

The 2019 San Luis Open Challenger Tour was a professional tennis tournament played on hard courts. It was the 26th edition of the tournament which was part of the 2019 ATP Challenger Tour. It took place in San Luis Potosí, Mexico between 15 and 21 April 2019.

== Singles main-draw entrants ==
=== Seeds ===
Country	Player	Rank^{1}	Seed
KAZ	Alexander Bublik	99	1
ESP	Adrián Menéndez Maceiras	139	2
GER	Dustin Brown	167	3
AUT	Sebastian Ofner	168	4
BIH	Mirza Bašić	174	5
ECU	Roberto Quiroz	179	6
SRB	Peđa Krstin	195	7
EGY	Mohamed Safwat	203	8
AUS	John-Patrick Smith	220	9
SLO	Blaž Rola	255	10
AUT	Lucas Miedler	258	11
ESA	Marcelo Arévalo	264	12
NED	Scott Griekspoor	273	13
ESP	Roberto Ortega Olmedo	281	14
DOM	Roberto Cid Subervi	283	15
SRB	Danilo Petrović	286	16

- ^{1} Rankings are as of 8 April 2019.

=== Other entrants ===
The following players received wildcards into the singles main draw:

- (Mexico) Lucas Gómez
- (Colombia) Nicolás Mejía
- (United States) Emilio Nava
- (Mexico) Manuel Sánchez
- (Serbia) Janko Tipsarević

The following players received entry into the singles main draw using a protected ranking:

- (Spain) Carlos Gómez-Herrera
- (Argentina) Facundo Mena

The following players received entry into the singles main draw as alternates:

- (Brazil) Pedro Sakamoto
- (Brazil) Thiago Seyboth Wild

The following players received entry into the singles main draw using their ITF World Tennis Ranking:

- (France) Baptiste Crepatte
- (France) Manuel Guinard
- (Brazil) João Menezes
- (Brazil) João Souza
- (Chile) Alejandro Tabilo

The following players received entry from the qualifying draw:

- (Mexico) Gerardo López Villaseñor
- (Netherlands) Sem Verbeek

== Champions ==
=== Singles ===
- (Switzerland) Marc-Andrea Hüsler def. (Spain) Adrián Menéndez Maceiras 7–5, 7–6^{(7–3)}.

=== Doubles ===
- (El Salvador) Marcelo Arévalo / (Mexico) Miguel Ángel Reyes-Varela def. (Uruguay) Ariel Behar / (Ecuador) Roberto Quiroz 1–6, 6–4, [12–10].
