= 2014 San Luis Potosí Challenger =

- Date: 14–19 April
- Edition: 21st
- Draw: 32S / 16D
- Prize money: $35,000+H
- Surface: Clay
- Location: San Luis Potosí, Mexico

Champions

Singles
- (Italy) Paolo Lorenzi

Doubles
- (United States) Kevin King / (Colombia) Juan Carlos Spir
- San Luis Potosí Challenger

The 2014 San Luis Potosí Challenger was a professional tennis tournament played on clay courts. It was the 20th edition of the tournament which was part of the 2014 ATP Challenger Tour. It took place in San Luis Potosí, Mexico between 14 and 19 April 2014.

== Singles main-draw entrants ==
=== Seeds ===
Country	Player	Rank	Seed
COL	Alejandro Falla	70	1
ITA	Paolo Lorenzi	99	2
DOM	Víctor Estrella Burgos	100	3
ESP	Adrián Menéndez Maceiras	188	4
ARG	Agustín Velotti	199	5
ESP	Daniel Muñoz de la Nava	265	6
USA	Chase Buchanan	285	7
USA	Nicolas Meister	305	8

=== Other entrants ===
The following players received wildcards into the singles main draw:

- (Mexico) Lucas Gómez
- (Mexico) Alan Núñez Aguilera
- (Mexico) Marcello Amador
- (Mexico) Tigre Hank

The following players received entry from the qualifying draw:

- (South Africa) Dean O'Brien
- (Mexico) César Ramírez
- (Australia) Chris Letcher
- (Peru) Mauricio Echazú

== Doubles main-draw entrants ==
=== Seeds ===
Country	Player	Country	Player	Rank	Seed
ESA	Marcelo Arévalo	COL	Nicolás Barrientos	323	1
USA	Kevin King	COL	Juan Carlos Spir	326	2
MEX	César Ramírez	MEX	Miguel Ángel Reyes-Varela	383	3
ESP	Adrián Menéndez Maceiras	ARG	Agustín Velotti	679	4

=== Other entrants ===
The following pairs received wildcards into the doubles main draw:

- (Mexico) Miguel Gallardo Valles / (Mexico) Alan Núñez Aguilera
- (Mexico) Lucas Gómez / (Mexico) Andres Zepeda
- (Mexico) Tigre Hank / (Mexico) Manuel Sánchez

== Champions ==
=== Singles ===
- (Italy) Paolo Lorenzi def. (Spain) Adrián Menéndez Maceiras, 6–1, 6–3

=== Doubles ===
- (United States) Kevin King / (Colombia) Juan Carlos Spir def. (Spain) Adrián Menéndez Maceiras / (Argentina) Agustín Velotti, 6–3, 6–4
