= 2013 San Luis Open Challenger – Doubles =

Tennis competition

Doubles
- 2013 San Luis Open Challenger

Final
- Champions: (Croatia) Marin Draganja (Spain) Adrián Menéndez-Maceiras
- Runners-up: (Switzerland) Marco Chiudinelli (Germany) Peter Gojowczyk
- Score: 6–4, 6–3

Events
Singles	Doubles
- San Luis Open Challenger

Nicholas Monroe and Simon Stadler were the defending champions but they decided to participate in the 2013 Seguros Bolívar Open Pereira instead.
Marin Draganja and Adrián Menéndez-Maceiras defeated Marco Chiudinelli and Peter Gojowczyk 6–4, 6–3 in the final to capture the title.

== Seeds ==
1. (India) Purav Raja / (India) Divij Sharan (semifinals)
2. (Chinese Taipei) Lee Hsin-han / (Chinese Taipei) Peng Hsien-yin (quarterfinals)
3. (Brazil) Marcelo Demoliner / (Croatia) Franco Škugor (first round)
4. (Croatia) Marin Draganja / (Spain) Adrián Menéndez-Maceiras (champions)

== Draw ==
Key

- Q = Qualifier
- WC = Wild card
- LL = Lucky loser
- Alt = Alternate
- ITF = ITF entry
- PR = Protected ranking
- SR = Special ranking
- SE = Special exempt
- JE = Junior exempt
- JR = Junior Accelerator Programme entrant
- CO = College Accelerator Programme entrant
- NG = Next Gen Accelerator Program entrant
- w/o = Walkover
- r = Retired
- d = Defaulted

=== Draw ===
First round
1	(India) P Raja (India) D Sharan	6	6
(Georgia (country)) N Basilashvili (Tunisia) M Jaziri	4	2
(Czech Republic) D Lojda (Australia) J Millman	2	6	[10]
(United States) V Mirzadeh (United States) T Sandgren	6	3	[5]
3	(Brazil) M Demoliner (Croatia) F Škugor	5	4
(Switzerland) M Chiudinelli (Germany) P Gojowczyk	7	6
WC	(Italy) R Ghedin (Mexico) M Sánchez	6	6
WC	(Mexico) M Gallardo Valles (Chile) N Massú	1	1
WC	(Mexico) D Garza (Mexico) MÁ Reyes-Varela	6	2	[10]
(Slovakia) A Martin (Italy) S Vagnozzi	3	6	[7]
(Australia) S Groth (Australia) M Reid	6	1	[6]
4	(Croatia) M Draganja (Spain) A Menéndez-Maceiras	4	6	[10]
(France) G Burquier (France) J Dasnières de Veigy	7	4	[4]
(Australia) C Ball (Australia) C Guccione	5	6	[10]
(Argentina) DS Schwartzman (Argentina) A Velotti	3	4
2	(Chinese Taipei) H-h Lee (Chinese Taipei) H-y Peng	6	6

Quarterfinals
1	(India) P Raja (India) D Sharan	6	6
(Czech Republic) D Lojda (Australia) J Millman	2	4
(Switzerland) M Chiudinelli (Germany) P Gojowczyk	6	6
WC	(Italy) R Ghedin (Mexico) M Sánchez	4	3
WC	(Mexico) D Garza (Mexico) MÁ Reyes-Varela	5	3
4	(Croatia) M Draganja (Spain) A Menéndez-Maceiras	7	6
(Australia) C Ball (Australia) C Guccione	4	6	[11]
2	(Chinese Taipei) H-h Lee (Chinese Taipei) H-y Peng	6	3	[9]

Semifinals
1	(India) P Raja (India) D Sharan	6^{3}	7^{9}	[11]
(Switzerland) M Chiudinelli (Germany) P Gojowczyk	7^{7}	6^{7}	[13]
4	(Croatia) M Draganja (Spain) A Menéndez-Maceiras	7^{7}	6
(Australia) C Ball (Australia) C Guccione	6^{5}	1

Final
(Switzerland) M Chiudinelli (Germany) P Gojowczyk	4	3
4	(Croatia) M Draganja (Spain) A Menéndez-Maceiras	6	6
