= 2017 San Luis Open Challenger Tour – Singles =

Singles
- 2017 San Luis Open Challenger Tour

Final
- Champion: (Slovakia) Andrej Martin
- Runner-up: (Spain) Adrián Menéndez Maceiras
- Score: 7–5, 6–4

Events
Singles	Doubles
- San Luis Open Challenger Tour

Peđa Krstin was the defending champion but lost in the first round to Caio Zampieri.

Andrej Martin won the title after defeating Adrián Menéndez Maceiras 7–5, 6–4 in the final.

== Seeds ==
1. (Argentina) Facundo Bagnis (quarterfinals)
2. (Austria) Gerald Melzer (quarterfinals)
3. (United States) Stefan Kozlov (first round)
4. (Brazil) João Souza (second round)
5. (Slovakia) Andrej Martin (champion)
6. (Egypt) Mohamed Safwat (first round)
7. (El Salvador) Marcelo Arévalo (quarterfinals)
8. (Spain) Adrián Menéndez Maceiras (final)

== Draw ==
Key

- Q = Qualifier
- WC = Wild card
- LL = Lucky loser
- Alt = Alternate
- ITF = ITF entry
- PR = Protected ranking
- SR = Special ranking
- SE = Special exempt
- JE = Junior exempt
- JR = Junior Accelerator Programme entrant
- CO = College Accelerator Programme entrant
- NG = Next Gen Accelerator Program entrant
- w/o = Walkover
- r = Retired
- d = Defaulted

=== Finals ===
Semifinals
5	(Slovakia) Andrej Martin	6	6
(Italy) Andrea Arnaboldi	4	3
WC	(Serbia) Miomir Kecmanović	3	4
8	(Spain) Adrián Menéndez Maceiras	6	6

Final
5	(Slovakia) Andrej Martin	7	6
8	(Spain) Adrián Menéndez Maceiras	5	4

=== Top half ===
First round
1/WC	(Argentina) F Bagnis	7^{8}	6
(Serbia) M Zekić	6^{6}	4
(Argentina) JI Londero	6	6
Q	(Uruguay) M Felder	3	3
(Argentina) T Lipovšek Puches	3	0
(Argentina) A Velotti	6	6
(Ecuador) I Endara	4	6	1
5	(Slovakia) A Martin	6	3	6
4	(Brazil) J Souza	6	7^{7}
LL	(Switzerland) L Margaroli	1	6^{2}
Q	(Dominican Republic) R Cid Subervi	1	2
(Ecuador) R Quiroz	6	6
(Brazil) A Ghem	2	7	1
(Italy) A Arnaboldi	6	5	6
WC	(Mexico) M Sánchez	4	7^{7}	6
6	(Egypt) M Safwat	6	6^{5}	4

Second round
1/WC	(Argentina) F Bagnis	6	4	6
(Argentina) JI Londero	3	6	3
(Argentina) A Velotti	2	1
5	(Slovakia) A Martin	6	6
4	(Brazil) J Souza	4	2
(Ecuador) R Quiroz	6	6
(Italy) A Arnaboldi	6	6
WC	(Mexico) M Sánchez	2	4

Quarterfinals
1/WC	(Argentina) F Bagnis	6	6^{2}	6^{6}
5	(Slovakia) A Martin	2	7^{7}	7^{8}
(Ecuador) R Quiroz	6^{2}	4
(Italy) A Arnaboldi	7^{7}	6

Semifinals
5	(Slovakia) A Martin	6	6
(Italy) A Arnaboldi	4	3

=== Bottom half ===
First round
7	(El Salvador) M Arévalo	6	6
Q	(Mexico) Carlos de la Peña	3	3
WC	(Mexico) T Hank	3	2
(Argentina) F Coria	6	6
(Colombia) DE Galán	4	4
(Ecuador) E Gómez	6	6
WC	(Serbia) M Kecmanović	6	7
3	(United States) S Kozlov	2	5
8	(Spain) A Menéndez Maceiras	6	7^{9}
(Brazil) JP Sorgi	2	6^{7}
(United States) A El Mihdawy	1^{r}
(United States) E King	5
(Brazil) C Zampieri	6	7^{7}
(Serbia) P Krstin	2	6^{1}
Q	(Argentina) F Argüello	2	2
2	(Austria) G Melzer	6	6

Second round
7	(El Salvador) M Arévalo	6	6
(Argentina) F Coria	1	4
(Ecuador) E Gómez	1	6	3
WC	(Serbia) M Kecmanović	6	4	6
8	(Spain) A Menéndez Maceiras	6	6
(United States) E King	1	2
(Brazil) C Zampieri	3	4
2	(Austria) G Melzer	6	6

Quarterfinals
7	(El Salvador) M Arévalo	4	3
WC	(Serbia) M Kecmanović	6	6
8	(Spain) A Menéndez Maceiras	2	6	6
2	(Austria) G Melzer	6	4	4

Semifinals
WC	(Serbia) M Kecmanović	3	4
8	(Spain) A Menéndez Maceiras	6	6
