= 2025 San Luis Open Challenger – Doubles =

Doubles
- 2025 San Luis Open Challenger

Final
- Champions: Ivan Liutarevich (United Kingdom) Marcus Willis
- Runners-up: (United States) Trey Hilderbrand (United States) Alfredo Perez
- Score: 6–3, 6–4

Events
Singles	Doubles
- San Luis Open Challenger

Rithvik Choudary Bollipalli and Niki Kaliyanda Poonacha were the defending champions but chose not to defend their title.

Ivan Liutarevich and Marcus Willis won the title after defeating Trey Hilderbrand and Alfredo Perez 6–3, 6–4 in the final.

== Seeds ==
1. (United States) Ryan Seggerman / (United States) Patrik Trhac (first round)
2. Ivan Liutarevich / (United Kingdom) Marcus Willis (champions)
3. (Austria) Neil Oberleitner / (Chile) Matías Soto (first round)
4. (Japan) Seita Watanabe / (Japan) Takeru Yuzuki (semifinals)

== Draw ==
Key

- Q = Qualifier
- WC = Wild card
- LL = Lucky loser
- Alt = Alternate
- ITF = ITF entry
- PR = Protected ranking
- SR = Special ranking
- SE = Special exempt
- JE = Junior exempt
- JR = Junior Accelerator Programme entrant
- CO = College Accelerator Programme entrant
- NG = Next Gen Accelerator Program entrant
- w/o = Walkover
- r = Retired
- d = Defaulted

=== Draw ===
First round
1	(United States) R Seggerman (United States) P Trhac	6	4	[11]
(Colombia) N Mejía (Colombia) A Urrea	4	6	[13]
(Austria) M Neuchrist (Ukraine) V Orlov	2	6	[3]
PR	(United States) T Hilderbrand (United States) A Perez	6	3	[10]
4	(Japan) S Watanabe (Japan) T Yuzuki	6	6^{8}	[10]
(United States) P Kumar (United States) J Sheehy	0	7^{10}	[5]
(Canada) JC Aguilar (United States) C Kingsley	3	6^{3}
(Brazil) M Alves (United States) W Woodall	6	7^{7}
(New Zealand) F Reynolds (New Zealand) J Watt	6	6
Alt	(France) Robin Catry (France) T Paris	2	2
(Bolivia) B Arias (Bolivia) F Zeballos	6	6
3	(Austria) N Oberleitner (Chile) M Soto	3	3
Alt	(United States) A Mayo (New Zealand) K Pannu	7	7^{7}
Alt	(United States) Tristan McCormick (United Kingdom) M Whitehouse	5	6^{4}
(France) M Janvier (France) L Pavlovic	2	6	[7]
2	I Liutarevich (United Kingdom) M Willis	6	3	[10]

Quarterfinals
(Colombia) N Mejía (Colombia) A Urrea	1	3
PR	(United States) T Hilderbrand (United States) A Perez	6	6
4	(Japan) S Watanabe (Japan) T Yuzuki	7^{7}	6
(Brazil) M Alves (United States) W Woodall	6^{2}	2
(New Zealand) F Reynolds (New Zealand) J Watt	6	3	[10]
(Bolivia) B Arias (Bolivia) F Zeballos	3	6	[7]
Alt	(United States) A Mayo (New Zealand) K Pannu
2	I Liutarevich (United Kingdom) M Willis	w/o

Semifinals
PR	(United States) T Hilderbrand (United States) A Perez	6	7^{7}
4	(Japan) S Watanabe (Japan) T Yuzuki	4	6^{3}
(New Zealand) F Reynolds (New Zealand) J Watt	4	4
2	I Liutarevich (United Kingdom) M Willis	6	6

Final
PR	(United States) T Hilderbrand (United States) A Perez	3	4
2	I Liutarevich (United Kingdom) M Willis	6	6
