= 2018 San Luis Open Challenger Tour =

- Date: 27 March – 1 April
- Edition: 25th
- Draw: 32S / 16D
- Surface: Clay
- Location: San Luis Potosí, Mexico

Champions

Singles
- (El Salvador) Marcelo Arévalo

Doubles
- (El Salvador) Marcelo Arévalo / (Mexico) Miguel Ángel Reyes-Varela
- San Luis Open Challenger Tour

The 2018 San Luis Open Challenger Tour was a professional tennis tournament played on hard courts. It was the 25th edition of the tournament which was part of the 2018 ATP Challenger Tour. It took place in San Luis Potosí, Mexico between 27 March and 1 April 2018.

== Singles main-draw entrants ==
=== Seeds ===
Country	Player	Rank^{1}	Seed
ITA	Paolo Lorenzi	57	1
AUT	Gerald Melzer	113	2
GER	Yannick Hanfmann	124	3
BRA	Thomaz Bellucci	135	4
DOM	Víctor Estrella Burgos	152	5
USA	Evan King	188	6
USA	Mitchell Krueger	207	7
SRB	Peđa Krstin	208	8

- ^{1} Rankings are as of 19 March 2018.

=== Other entrants ===
The following players received wildcards into the singles main draw:

- (Mexico) Lucas Gómez
- (Mexico) Tigre Hank
- (Mexico) Gerardo López Villaseñor
- (Mexico) Manuel Sánchez

The following players received entry from the qualifying draw:

- (Dominican Republic) Roberto Cid Subervi
- (Ecuador) Gonzalo Escobar
- (Germany) Kevin Krawietz
- (Brazil) Pedro Sakamoto

== Champions ==
=== Singles ===
- (El Salvador) Marcelo Arévalo def. (Dominican Republic) Roberto Cid Subervi 6–3, 6–7^{(3–7)}, 6–4.

=== Doubles ===
- (El Salvador) Marcelo Arévalo / (Mexico) Miguel Ángel Reyes-Varela def. (United Kingdom) Jay Clarke / (Germany) Kevin Krawietz 6–1, 6–4.
