= 2009 San Luis Potosí Challenger =

- Date: April 6 – April 12
- Edition: 19th
- Location: San Luis Potosí, Mexico

Champions

Singles
- (Colombia) Santiago Giraldo

Doubles
- (Mexico) Santiago González / (Argentina) Horacio Zeballos
- San Luis Potosí Challenger

The 2009 San Luis Potosí Challenger was a professional tennis tournament played on outdoor red clay courts. It was part of the 2009 ATP Challenger Tour. It took place in San Luis Potosí, Mexico between 6 and 12 April 2009.

== Singles entrants ==
=== Seeds ===
Nationality	Player	Ranking*	Seeding
ARG	Horacio Zeballos	126	1
COL	Santiago Giraldo	146	2
BRA	Franco Ferreiro	155	3
ARG	Mariano Puerta	205	4
COL	Alejandro Falla	207	5
SUI	Michael Lammer	219	6
MEX	Santiago González	223	7
ITA	Paolo Lorenzi	227	8

- Rankings are as of March 23, 2009.

=== Other entrants ===
The following players received wildcards into the singles main draw:

- (Mexico) Luis Manuel Flores
- (Argentina) Mariano Puerta
- (Mexico) Manuel Sánchez
- (Argentina) Mariano Zabaleta

The following players received entry from the qualifying draw:

- (Ecuador) Júlio César Campozano
- (Colombia) Juan Sebastián Cabal
- (Colombia) Alejandro González
- (France) Vincent Millot

== Champions ==
=== Men's singles ===
(Colombia) Santiago Giraldo def. (Italy) Paolo Lorenzi, 6–2, 6–7(3), 6–2

=== Men's doubles ===
(Mexico) Santiago González / (Argentina) Horacio Zeballos def. (Brazil) Franco Ferreiro / (Brazil) Júlio Silva, 6–2, 7–6(5)
