= 2025 San Luis Open Challenger =

- Date: 14–20 April
- Edition: 37th
- Surface: Clay
- Location: San Luis Potosí, Mexico
- Venue: Club Deportivo Potosino

Champions

Singles
- (Australia) James Duckworth

Doubles
- Ivan Liutarevich / (United Kingdom) Marcus Willis
- San Luis Open Challenger

The 2025 San Luis Tennis Open, presentado por Banorte, was a professional tennis tournament played on outdoor clay courts. It was the 37th edition of the tournament which was part of the 2025 ATP Challenger Tour. It took place at the Club Deportivo Potosino in San Luis Potosí, Mexico between 14 and 20 April 2025.

== Singles main-draw entrants ==
=== Seeds ===
Country	Player	Rank^{1}	Seed
AUS	James Duckworth	90	1
FRA	Adrian Mannarino	134	2
~~BRA~~	~~Felipe Meligeni Alves~~	~~153~~	~~3~~
ARG	Juan Pablo Ficovich	155	4
MEX	Rodrigo Pacheco Méndez	224	5
CHI	Matías Soto	247	6
COL	Nicolás Mejía	257	7
GER	Patrick Zahraj	273	8

- ^{1} Rankings are as of 7 April 2025.

=== Other entrants ===
The following players received wildcards into the singles main draw:

- (Mexico) Rodrigo Alujas
- (Mexico) Alex Hernández
- (France) Adrian Mannarino

The following players received entry into the singles main draw as alternates:

- (New Zealand) Kiranpal Pannu
- (United States) Alfredo Perez
- (Germany) Max Wiskandt

The following players received entry from the qualifying draw:

- (Mexico) Rafael de Alba
- (United States) Cannon Kingsley
- (Canada) Dan Martin
- (United States) Tristan McCormick
- (Colombia) Miguel Tobón
- (New Zealand) James Watt

The following player received entry as a lucky loser:

- (United States) Felix Corwin

== Champions ==
=== Singles ===
- (Australia) James Duckworth def. (Germany) Max Wiskandt 6–1, 6–1.

=== Doubles ===
- Ivan Liutarevich / (United Kingdom) Marcus Willis def. (United States) Trey Hilderbrand / (United States) Alfredo Perez 6–3, 6–4.
