= 2012 San Luis Potosí Challenger =

- Date: 2–8 April
- Edition: 19th
- Surface: Clay
- Location: San Luis Potosí, Mexico

Champions

Singles
- (Spain) Rubén Ramírez Hidalgo

Doubles
- (United States) Nicholas Monroe / (Germany) Simon Stadler
- San Luis Potosí Challenger

The 2012 San Luis Potosí Challenger was a professional tennis tournament played on clay courts. It was the 19th edition of the tournament which was part of the 2012 ATP Challenger Tour. It took place in San Luis Potosí, Mexico between 2 and 8 April 2012.

== Singles main draw entrants ==
=== Seeds ===
Country	Player	Rank^{1}	Seed
ITA	Paolo Lorenzi	81	1
ESP	Rubén Ramírez Hidalgo	121	2
ESP	Arnau Brugués-Davi	152	3
ITA	Matteo Viola	154	4
CZE	Jan Mertl	211	5
CAN	Érik Chvojka	223	6
MDA	Roman Borvanov	235	7
COL	Alejandro González	255	8

- ^{1} Rankings are as of March 19, 2012.

=== Other entrants ===
The following players received wildcards into the singles main draw:

- (Mexico) Luis Patino
- (Mexico) Miguel Angel Reyes-Varela
- (Mexico) Bruno Rodríguez
- (Mexico) Manuel Sanchez

The following players received entry from the qualifying draw:

- (Ecuador) Júlio César Campozano
- (Peru) Mauricio Echazú
- (Slovakia) Andrej Martin
- (United States) Denis Zivkovic

The following player received entry as a lucky loser into the singles main draw:

- (Brazil) Fabiano de Paula

== Champions ==
=== Singles ===
- (Spain) Rubén Ramírez Hidalgo def. (Italy) Paolo Lorenzi 3–6, 6–3, 6–4

=== Doubles ===
- (United States) Nicholas Monroe / (Germany) Simon Stadler def. (Germany) Andre Begemann / (Australia) Jordan Kerr 3–6, 7–5, [10–7]
