= 2025 San Luis Open Challenger – Singles =

Singles
- 2025 San Luis Open Challenger

Final
- Champion: (Australia) James Duckworth
- Runner-up: (Germany) Max Wiskandt
- Score: 6–1, 6–1

Events
Singles	Doubles
- San Luis Open Challenger

Nicolás Mejía was the defending champion but lost in the second round to Santiago Rodríguez Taverna.

James Duckworth won the title after defeating Max Wiskandt 6–1, 6–1 in the final.

== Seeds ==
1. (Australia) James Duckworth (champion)
2. (France) Adrian Mannarino (first round)
3. (Brazil) Felipe Meligeni Alves (withdrew)
4. (Argentina) Juan Pablo Ficovich (semifinals)
5. (Mexico) Rodrigo Pacheco Méndez (second round)
6. (Chile) Matías Soto (second round)
7. (Colombia) Nicolás Mejía (second round)
8. (Germany) Patrick Zahraj (second round, retired)

== Draw ==
Key

- Q = Qualifier
- WC = Wild card
- LL = Lucky loser
- Alt = Alternate
- ITF = ITF entry
- PR = Protected ranking
- SR = Special ranking
- SE = Special exempt
- JE = Junior exempt
- JR = Junior Accelerator Programme entrant
- CO = College Accelerator Programme entrant
- NG = Next Gen Accelerator Program entrant
- w/o = Walkover
- r = Retired
- d = Defaulted

=== Finals ===
Semifinals
1	(Australia) James Duckworth	7^{10}	6
Q	(Canada) Dan Martin	6^{8}	2
4	(Argentina) Juan Pablo Ficovich	3	4
Alt	(Germany) Max Wiskandt	6	6

Final
1	(Australia) James Duckworth	6	6
Alt	(Germany) Max Wiskandt	1	1

=== Top half ===
First round
1	(Australia) J Duckworth	6	6
Q	(Mexico) Rafael de Alba	1	2
(Austria) M Neuchrist	6	7^{8}
Q	(United States) Tristan McCormick	4	6^{6}
Alt	(United States) A Perez	6	7^{7}
Q	(New Zealand) J Watt	4	6^{3}
Alt	(New Zealand) K Pannu	2	2
5	(Mexico) R Pacheco Méndez	6	6
LL	(United States) Felix Corwin	1	4
Q	(Canada) D Martin	6	6
(United States) M Cressy	3	4
(France) T Paris	6	6
(Brazil) M Alves	7^{7}	6
(Canada) JC Aguilar	6^{5}	4
(United States) G Johns	3	6^{2}
6	(Chile) M Soto	6	7^{7}

Second round
1	(Australia) J Duckworth	6	7^{7}
(Austria) M Neuchrist	2	6^{4}
Alt	(United States) A Perez	7	6
5	(Mexico) R Pacheco Méndez	5	4
Q	(Canada) D Martin	7^{7}	6
(France) T Paris	6^{5}	2
(Brazil) M Alves	6	6
6	(Chile) M Soto	3	4

Quarterfinals
1	(Australia) J Duckworth	7^{9}	6
Alt	(United States) A Perez	6^{7}	4
Q	(Canada) D Martin	7^{7}	2	7
(Brazil) M Alves	6^{1}	6	5

Semifinals
1	(Australia) J Duckworth	7^{10}	6
Q	(Canada) D Martin	6^{8}	2

=== Bottom half ===
First round
8	(Germany) P Zahraj	6	6
(Canada) Alvin Nicholas Tudorica	3	1
(United States) A Mayo	5	1
Q	(Colombia) Miguel Tobón	7	6
Q	(United States) C Kingsley	1	6	4
(Dominican Republic) R Cid Subervi	6	4	6
(France) M Janvier	7^{7}	2	3
4	(Argentina) JP Ficovich	6^{4}	6	6
7	(Colombia) N Mejía	6	6
WC	(Mexico) A Hernández	3	2
(France) L Pavlovic	7^{7}	4	4
(Argentina) S Rodríguez Taverna	6^{2}	6	6
WC	(Mexico) Rodrigo Alujas	7^{7}	6
(Austria) N Oberleitner	6^{5}	2
Alt	(Germany) M Wiskandt	2	6	7^{7}
2/WC	(France) A Mannarino	6	2	6^{3}

Second round
8	(Germany) P Zahraj	6	3	0^{r}
Q	(Colombia) M Tobón	4	6	2
(Dominican Republic) R Cid Subervi	3	4
4	(Argentina) JP Ficovich	6	6
7	(Colombia) N Mejía	5	4
(Argentina) S Rodríguez Taverna	7	6
WC	(Mexico) R Alujas	6	5	6^{3}
Alt	(Germany) M Wiskandt	3	7	7^{7}

Quarterfinals
Q	(Colombia) M Tobón	0	1
4	(Argentina) JP Ficovich	6	6
(Argentina) S Rodríguez Taverna	6	4	3
Alt	(Germany) M Wiskandt	3	6	6

Semifinals
4	(Argentina) JP Ficovich	3	4
Alt	(Germany) M Wiskandt	6	6
