= Indore Open ATP Challenger =

ATP Challenger Tour
- Location: Indore, India
- Category: ATP Challenger Tour
- Surface: Hard
- Draw: 32S/16Q/16D
- Prize money: US$50,000

The Indore Open ATP Challenger was a tennis tournament held in Indore, India. The event was part of the ATP Challenger Tour and was played on hard courts. It was only played in 2014.

== Past finals ==
=== Singles ===
Year	Champion	Runner-up	Score
2014	(India) Saketh Myneni	(Kazakhstan) Aleksandr Nedovyesov	6–3, 6–7^{(4–7)}, 6–3

=== Doubles ===
Year	Champions	Runners-up	Score
2014	(Spain) Adrián Menéndez Maceiras (Kazakhstan) Aleksandr Nedovyesov	(India) Yuki Bhambri (India) Divij Sharan	2–6, 6–4, [10–3]
