= Adrián Menéndez Maceiras =

Spanish tennis player (born 1985)

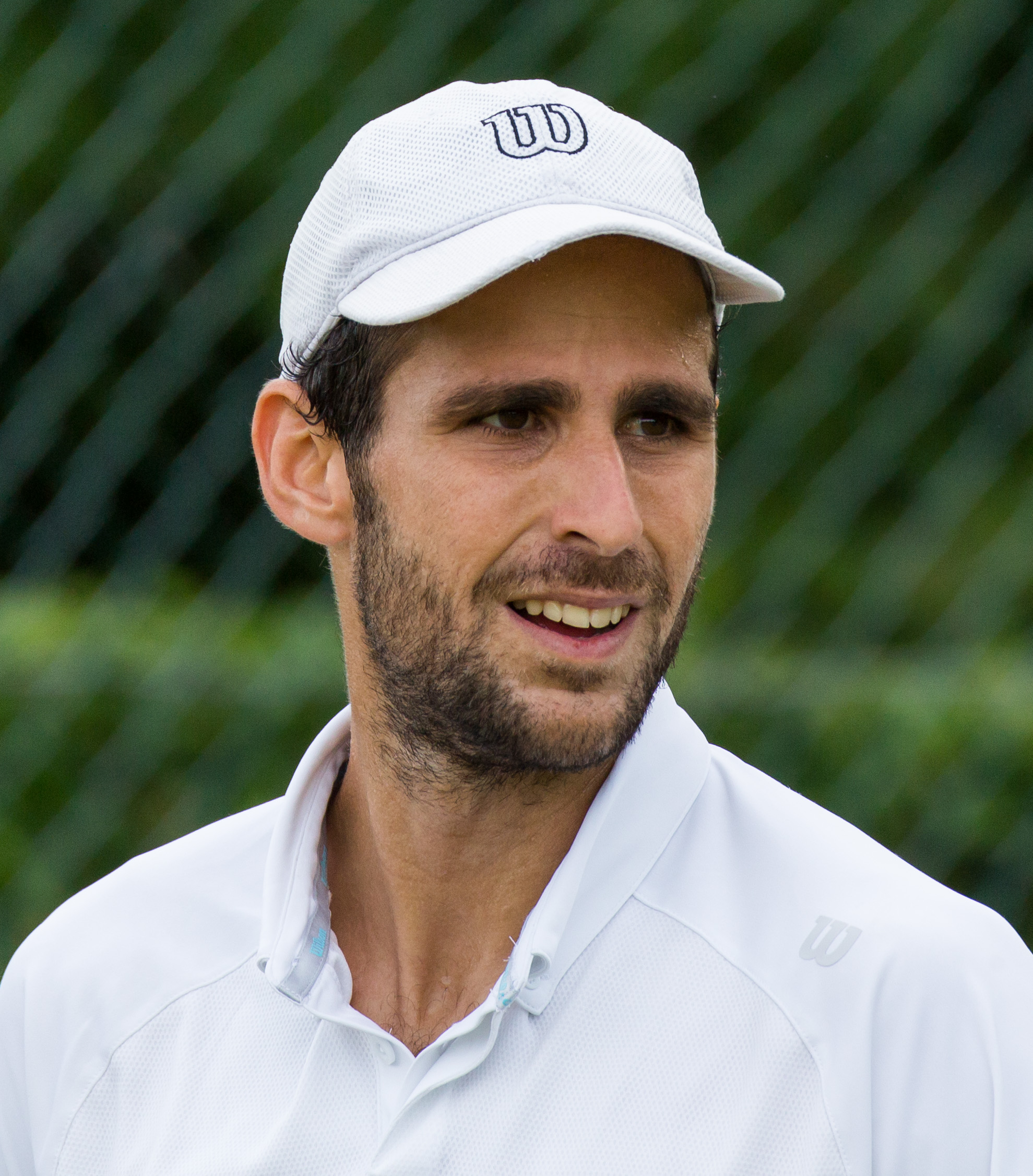
- Menéndez Maceiras in 2014
- Country (sports): Spain
- Born: 28 October 1985 (age 41) Marbella, Spain
- Height: 1.85 m (6 ft 1 in)
- Turned pro: 2005
- Retired: 2023
- Plays: Right-handed (two-handed backhand)
- Coach: Manuel Martín
- Prize money: $ 1,289,666

Singles
- Career record: 6–18
- Career titles: 0
- Highest ranking: No. 111 (8 June 2015)

Grand Slam singles results
- Australian Open: 1R (2013)
- French Open: Q3 (2015)
- Wimbledon: 1R (2012)
- US Open: 2R (2017)

Doubles
- Career record: 5–7
- Career titles: 0
- Highest ranking: No. 104 (19 March 2012)

Grand Slam doubles results
- Wimbledon: 1R (2015)

Adrián Menéndez Maceiras (Spanish pronunciation: [aˈðɾjam meˈnendeθ maˈθejɾas]; (Note: In isolation, Adrián is pronounced [aˈðɾjan].) born 28 October 1985) is a Spanish former tennis player. He has a career high-ranking singles of World No. 111, achieved in June 2015.

Menéndez Maceiras has reached the finals of fourteen Futures tournaments, winning nine of them. He has won four Challenger tournaments, lifting his maiden title at the 2007 Open Diputación Challenger in Pozoblanco, Spain defeating Dudi Sela in the final.

== Challenger and Futures/World Tennis Tour finals ==
=== Singles: 32 (13–19) ===
Legend (singles) ATP Challenger Tour (4–13) ITF Futures Tour/World Tennis Tour (9–6)	Titles by surface Hard (7–14) Clay (6–5) Grass (0–0) Carpet (0–0)

Result	W–L	Date	Tournament	Tier	Surface	Opponent	Score
Win	1–0	Mar 2006	Portugal F2, Lagos	Futures	Hard	(Spain) Daniel Muñoz de la Nava	3–6, 6–4, 6–3
Win	2–0	Jan 2007	Spain F1, Menorca	Futures	Clay	(Spain) Javier Genaro-Martínez	7–6^{(7–1)}, 3–6, 7–6^{(7–2)}
Loss	2–1	Feb 2007	Spain F6, Cartagena	Futures	Clay	(Netherlands) Matwé Middelkoop	5–7, 6–4, 0–6
Win	3–1	Feb 2007	Spain F7, Cartagena	Futures	Hard	(Portugal) Gastão Elias	3–6, 6–2, 6–4
Win	4–1	Jul 2007	Córdoba, Spain	Challenger	Hard	(Israel) Dudi Sela	6–4, 0–6, 7–5
Loss	4–2	Nov 2007	Spain F39, Vilafranca	Futures	Clay	(Spain) Marc Fornell Mestres	4–6, 4–6
Loss	4–3	Jan 2008	Miami, USA	Challenger	Clay	(France) Éric Prodon	4–6, 4–6
Win	5–3	Mar 2009	Spain F7, Terrassa	Futures	Clay	(Spain) Georgi Rumenov Payakov	6–4, 6–3
Win	6–3	May 2009	Spain F17, Valldoreix	Futures	Clay	(Spain) Marc Fornell Mestres	6–2, 6–2
Win	7–3	Jul 2009	France F12, Saint-Gervais	Futures	Clay	(Portugal) João Sousa	1–6, 6–4, 7–5
Win	8–3	Aug 2009	Germany F12, Dortmund	Futures	Clay	(Germany) Cedrik-Marcel Stebe	7–5, 6–1
Win	9–3	Oct 2009	Spain F34, Córdoba	Futures	Hard	(Slovakia) Pavol Červenák	6–3, 6–3
Win	10–3	Oct 2010	Spain F35, Martos	Futures	Hard	(Portugal) João Sousa	7–5, 7–6^{(8–6)}
Loss	10–4	Oct 2011	Spain F36, Córdoba	Futures	Hard	(Spain) Iván Navarro	7–6^{(7–4)}, 4–6, 6–7^{(6–8)}
Loss	10–5	Oct 2011	France F20, Rodez	Futures	Hard (i)	(Belgium) David Goffin	3–6, 2–6
Loss	10–6	Jan 2012	Nouméa, New Caledonia	Challenger	Hard	(France) Jérémy Chardy	4–6, 3–6
Loss	10–7	Apr 2014	San Luis Potosí, Mexico	Challenger	Clay	(Italy) Paolo Lorenzi	1–6, 3–6
Loss	10–8	Aug 2014	Segovia, Spain	Challenger	Hard	(France) Adrian Mannarino	3–6, 0–6
Loss	10–9	Oct 2014	Pune, India	Challenger	Hard	(Japan) Yūichi Sugita	7–6^{(7–1)}, 4–6, 4–6
Loss	10–10	Jan 2015	Nouméa, New Caledonia	Challenger	Hard	(Belgium) Steve Darcis	3–6, 2–6
Loss	10–11	Apr 2015	León, Mexico	Challenger	Hard	(United States) Austin Krajicek	7–6^{(7–3)}, 6–7^{(5–7)}, 4–6
Loss	10–12	Oct 2015	Bangalore, India	Challenger	Hard	(United Kingdom) James Ward	2–6, 5–7
Loss	10–13	Jul 2016	Spain F19, Bakio	Futures	Hard	(Spain) Ricardo Ojeda Lara	2–6, 3–6
Win	11–13	Apr 2017	León, Mexico	Challenger	Hard	(Ecuador) Roberto Quiroz	6–4, 3–6, 6–3
Loss	11–14	Apr 2017	San Luis Potosí, Mexico	Challenger	Hard	(Slovakia) Andrej Martin	5–7, 4–6
Win	12–14	May 2017	Samarkand, Uzbekistan	Challenger	Clay	(Bosnia and Herzegovina) Aldin Šetkić	6–4, 6–2
Win	13–14	May 2018	Puerto Vallarta, Mexico	Challenger	Hard	(Serbia) Danilo Petrović	1–6, 7–5, 6–3
Loss	13–15	Jul 2018	Recanati, Italy	Challenger	Hard	(Germany) Daniel Brands	5–7, 3–6
Loss	13–16	Aug 2018	Segovia, Spain	Challenger	Hard	(France) Ugo Humbert	3–6, 4–6
Loss	13–17	Apr 2019	San Luis Potosí, Mexico	Challenger	Clay	(Switzerland) Marc-Andrea Hüsler	5–7, 6–7^{(3–7)}
Loss	13-18	Jul 2021	M25 Bakio, Spain	World Tennis Tour	Hard	(France) Hugo Grenier	0-6, 1-6
Loss	13–19	Apr 2022	Cuernavaca, Mexico	Challenger	Hard	(United Kingdom) Jay Clarke	1-6, 6-4, 6-7^{(5-7)}

=== Doubles: 35 (16–19) ===
Legend (doubles) ATP Challenger Tour (12–17) ITF Futures Tour (4–2)	Titles by surface Hard (6–9) Clay (9–10) Grass (0–0) Carpet (1–0)

Result	W–L	Date	Tournament	Tier	Surface	Partner	Opponents	Score
Win	1–0	Jan 2007	Spain F1, Menorca	Futures	Clay	(Spain) Guillem Burniol	(Spain) Jordi Marsé-Vidri (Spain) Juan Albert Viloca Puig	6–3, 7–6^{(7–4)}
Loss	1–1	May 2007	Spain F19, Valldoreix	Futures	Clay	(Portugal) Frederico Marques	(Spain) David Cañudas-Fernández (Spain) Carlos Rexach-Itoiz	4–6, 4–6
Win	2–1	May 2009	Spain F17, Valldoreix	Futures	Clay	(Spain) Georgi Rumenov Payakov	(Spain) Agustín Boje-Ordóñez (Spain) Marc Fornell Mestres	4–6, 6–4, [10–8]
Win	3–1	Jun 2009	Spain F20, La Palma	Futures	Hard	(Spain) Gerard Granollers Pujol	(Spain) Javier Martí (Spain) Andoni Vivanco-Guzmán	6–4, 6–2
Win	4–1	Jun 2009	Spain F21, Puerto de la Cruz	Futures	Carpet	(Spain) Agustín Boje-Ordóñez	(Russia) Nikolai Nesterov (Spain) Andoni Vivanco-Guzmán	6–2, 6–4
Loss	4–2	Oct 2009	Spain F33, Martos	Futures	Hard	(Spain) José Checa Calvo	(Spain) Abraham González-Jiménez (Spain) Carlos Rexach-Itoiz	4–6, 2–6
Win	5–2	Feb 2011	Casablanca, Morocco	Challenger	Clay	(Spain) Guillermo Alcaide	(Portugal) Leonardo Tavares (Italy) Simone Vagnozzi	6–2, 6–1
Loss	5–3	Apr 2011	Blumenau, Brazil	Challenger	Clay	(Portugal) Leonardo Tavares	(Brazil) Franco Ferreiro (Brazil) André Sá	2–6, 6–3, [4–10]
Win	6–3	Jun 2011	Prostějov, Czech Republic	Challenger	Clay	(Ukraine) Sergei Bubka	(Spain) David Marrero (Spain) Rubén Ramírez Hidalgo	7–5, 6–2
Win	7–3	Jun 2011	Milan, Italy	Challenger	Clay	(Italy) Simone Vagnozzi	(Italy) Andrea Arnaboldi (Portugal) Leonardo Tavares	0–6, 6–3, [10–5]
Loss	7–4	Jul 2011	Penza, Russia	Challenger	Hard	(Ukraine) Sergei Bubka	(Spain) Arnau Brugués Davi (Tunisia) Malek Jaziri	7–6^{(8–6)}, 2–6, [8–10]
Loss	7–5	Sep 2011	Seville, Spain	Challenger	Clay	(Spain) Gerard Granollers Pujol	(Spain) Daniel Muñoz de la Nava (Spain) Rubén Ramírez Hidalgo	4–6, 7–6^{(7–4)}, [11–13]
Win	8–5	Feb 2012	Meknes, Morocco	Challenger	Clay	(Czech Republic) Jaroslav Pospíšil	(Spain) Gerard Granollers Pujol (Spain) Iván Navarro	6–3, 3–6, [10–8]
Loss	8–6	May 2012	Rome, Italy	Challenger	Clay	(Italy) Walter Trusendi	(United Kingdom) Jamie Delgado (United Kingdom) Ken Skupski	1–6, 4–6
Loss	8–7	Sep 2012	Istanbul, Turkey	Challenger	Hard	(Australia) John Peers	(Slovakia) Karol Beck (Czech Republic) Lukáš Dlouhý	6–3, 2–6, [6–10]
Win	9–7	Mar 2013	San Luis Potosí, Mexico	Challenger	Clay	(Croatia) Marin Draganja	(Switzerland) Marco Chiudinelli (Germany) Peter Gojowczyk	6–4, 6–3
Loss	9–8	Sep 2013	Istanbul, Turkey	Challenger	Hard	(Republic of Ireland) James Cluskey	(United Kingdom) Jamie Delgado (Australia) Jordan Kerr	3–6, 2–6
Loss	9–9	Oct 2013	Mouilleron-le-Captif, France	Challenger	Hard (i)	(Finland) Henri Kontinen	(France) Fabrice Martin (France) Hugo Nys	6–3, 3–6, [8–10]
Loss	9–10	Apr 2014	San Luis Potosí, Mexico	Challenger	Clay	(Argentina) Agustín Velotti	(United States) Kevin King (Colombia) Juan Carlos Spir	3–6, 4–6
Win	10–10	May 2014	Ostrava, Czech Republic	Challenger	Clay	(Russia) Andrey Kuznetsov	(Italy) Alessandro Motti (Italy) Matteo Viola	4–6, 6–3, [10–8]
Loss	10–11	Jun 2014	Fürth, Germany	Challenger	Clay	(Spain) Rubén Ramírez Hidalgo	(Spain) Gerard Granollers Pujol (Spain) Jordi Samper Montaña	6–7^{(1–7)}, 2–6
Win	11–11	Oct 2014	Indore, India	Challenger	Hard	(Kazakhstan) Aleksandr Nedovyesov	(India) Yuki Bhambri (India) Divij Sharan	2–6, 6–4, [10–3]
Win	12–11	May 2015	Karshi, Uzbekistan	Challenger	Hard	(India) Yuki Bhambri	(Belarus) Sergey Betov (Russia) Mikhail Elgin	5–7, 6–3, [10–8]
Win	13–11	Oct 2015	Pune, India	Challenger	Hard	(Spain) Gerard Granollers Pujol	(Austria) Maximilian Neuchrist (India) Divij Sharan	3–6, 7–6^{(7–4)}, [10–8]
Loss	13–12	Jul 2016	Recanati, Italy	Challenger	Hard	(Belgium) Ruben Bemelmans	(Germany) Kevin Krawietz (France) Albano Olivetti	3–6, 6–7^{(4–7)}
Loss	13–13	Jan 2017	Nouméa, New Caledonia	Challenger	Hard	(Italy) Stefano Napolitano	(France) Quentin Halys (France) Tristan Lamasine	6–7^{(9–11)}, 1–6
Loss	13–14	Apr 2017	Panama City, Panama	Challenger	Clay	(Germany) Kevin Krawietz	(Peru) Sergio Galdós (Brazil) Caio Zampieri	6–1, 6–7^{(5–7)}, [7–10]
Loss	13–15	Apr 2017	San Luis Potosí, Mexico	Challenger	Clay	(Mexico) Hans Hach	(Ecuador) Roberto Quiroz (Brazil) Caio Zampieri	4–6, 2–6
Loss	13–16	May 2017	Karshi, Uzbekistan	Challenger	Hard	(Germany) Kevin Krawietz	(Ukraine) Denys Molchanov (Ukraine) Sergiy Stakhovsky	4–6, 6–7^{(7–9)}
Win	14–16	Aug 2017	Segovia, Spain	Challenger	Hard	(Ukraine) Sergiy Stakhovsky	(Spain) Roberto Ortega Olmedo (Spain) David Vega Hernández	4–6, 6–3, [10–7]
Loss	14–17	Nov 2017	Pune, India	Challenger	Hard	(Spain) Pedro Martínez	(Bosnia and Herzegovina) Tomislav Brkić (Croatia) Ante Pavić	1–6, 6–7^{(5–7)}
Loss	14–18	Jun 2021	Almaty, Kazakhstan	Challenger	Clay	(France) Corentin Denolly	(Ukraine) Vladyslav Manafov (Ukraine) Vitaliy Sachko	1-6, 4-6
Loss	14–19	Sep 2021	Quito, Ecuador	Challenger	Clay	(Spain) Mario Vilella Martínez	(Colombia) Alejandro Gómez (Argentina) Thiago Agustín Tirante	5-7, 7-6^{(7-5)}, [8-10]
Win	15–19	Apr 2022	Cuernavaca, Mexico	Challenger	Hard	(United States) JC Aragone	(Colombia) Nicolás Mejía (Ecuador) Roberto Quiroz	7–6^{(7–4)}, 6–2
Win	16–19	Jul 2022	Cali, Colombia	Challenger	Clay	(Tunisia) Malek Jaziri	(United States) Keegan Smith (United States) Evan Zhu	7-5, 6-4
