= San Luis Open (tennis) =

San Luis Potosí Open

Tournament information
- Event name: San Luis Open (-2024), Banorte Tennis Open (2025-)
- Founded: 1955; 71 years ago
- Location: San Luis Potosí, Mexico
- Venue: Club Deportivo Potosino
- Surface: Clay / outdoors
- Website: Website

Current champions (ATP 2025, WTA 2024)
- Men's singles: (Australia) James Duckworth
- Women's singles: (Argentina) Nadia Podoroska
- Men's doubles: Ivan Liutarevich (United Kingdom) Marcus Willis
- Women's doubles: (Hungary) Anna Bondár (Slovenia) Tamara Zidanšek
ATP Tour
- Category: ATP Challenger 75
- Draw: 32S / 24Q / 16D
- Prize money: $100,000 (2025)
WTA Tour
- Category: WTA 125
- Draw: 32S / 8Q / 16D
- Prize money: US$115,000 (2024)

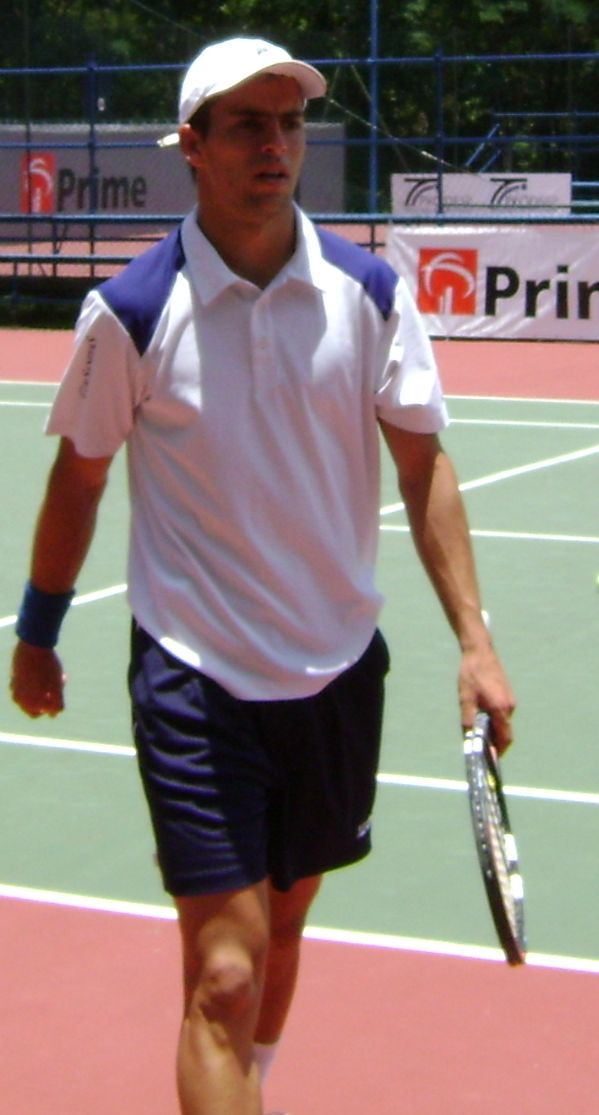
Runner-up in 2007, Colombian Santiago Giraldo eventually took the singles titles in 2009 over Paolo Lorenzi

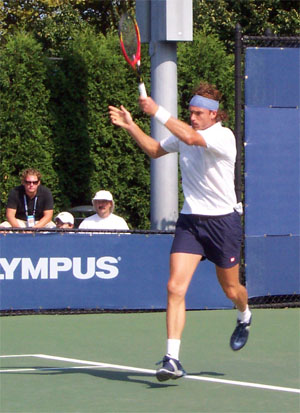
Belgian Dick Norman reached four finals in San Luis Potosí City, winning the singles and doubles events in 2002, the singles in 2003, and finishing singles runner-up in 2005

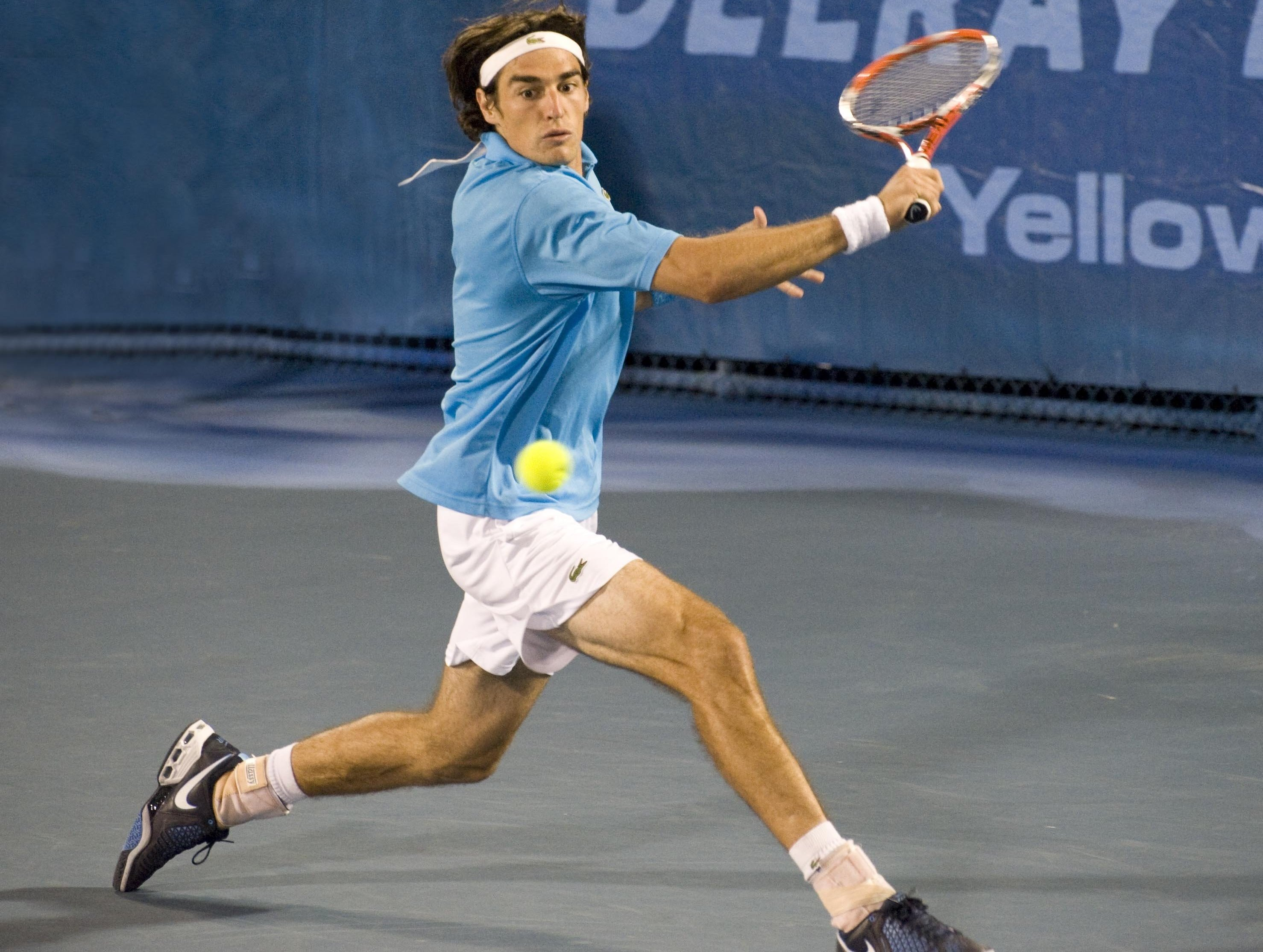
Frenchman Jérémy Chardy titled in doubles in 2007 alongside Marcelo Melo

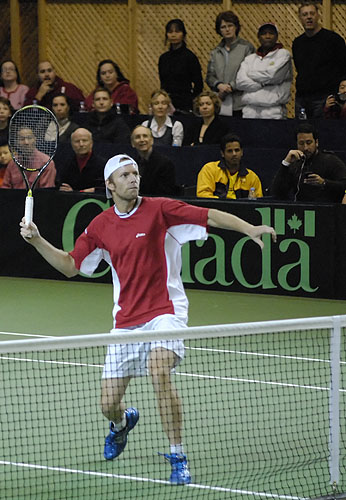
Canada's Frédéric Niemeyer partnered Alex Bogomolov Jr. for a 2003 victory in the doubles event

The Banorte Tennis Open also known as the San Luis Tennis Open is a professional tennis tournament played on outdoor red clay courts. The event is currently part of the ATP Challenger Tour and is the second-longest running Challenger tournament, since 1980 (behind only Tampere Open in Finland). It was part of the WTA Challenger Tour in 2023 and in 2024.

== History ==
The tournament was founded in 1955 as the San Luis Potosí Tennis Tournament. In 1959 it became known as the San Luis Potosí International.

The event has been organized by the Club Deportivo Potosino in San Luis Potosí City, San Luis Potosí, Mexico, since inception. The women's edition started in 1959 until 2006, it has since been revived in 2023 and in 2024.

Joaquín Loyo-Mayo holds the record for most men's singles titles wins at six. Leonardo Lavalle established the record for men's doubles titles, with four wins. He partnered with a different player each of this time. He hold along with Miguel Ángel Reyes-Varela the record of consecutive victories, three. Leonardo Lavalle, Dick Norman and Marcelo Arévalo were the only players to win both singles and doubles titles the same year.

== Past finals ==
=== Men's singles ===
(incomplete roll)

Year	Champion	Runner-up	Score
1955	(Mexico) Manuel Gallardo	(Mexico) Rafael Ortega	6–3, 6–3, 6–4.
1956	(Mexico) Rafael Ortega	(Mexico) Angel Ochoa	6–4, 6–3, 6–2.
1957	(Mexico) Gustavo Palafox	(Mexico) Federico Cervantes	6–3, 6–3, 6–3.
1958	(Mexico) Rafael Osuna	(Mexico) Gustavo Palafox	6–4, 4–6, 6–2.
1959	(Mexico) Gustavo Palafox (2)	(Mexico) Esteban Reyes Jr.	6–0, 6–0, 8–6.
1960	(Mexico) Gustavo Palafox (3)	(Mexico) Esteban Reyes Jr.	6–3, 6–4, 7–5.
1961	(Mexico) Mario Llamas	(Mexico) Francisco Contreras	6–4, 6–2.
1962	(South Africa) Cliff Drysdale	(South Africa) John Maloney	6–0, 6–3.
1963	(Mexico) Joaquín Loyo-Mayo	(South Africa) John Maloney	6–4, 3–6, 12–10.
1964	(United States) Don Kierbow	(Mexico) Juan Arredondo	6–3, 0–6, 6–4.
1965	(Mexico) Juan Arredondo	(Mexico) Gabino Palafox	6–3, 6–4.
1966	(Mexico) Vicente Zarazúa	(Mexico) Lucio Baltazar	6–4, 6–3.
1967	(Mexico) Joaquín Loyo-Mayo (2)	(France) Daniel Contet	6–2, 6–2.
1968	(Mexico) Joaquín Loyo-Mayo (3)	(Ecuador) Pancho Guzmán	6–2, 7–5.
↓ Open Era ↓
1969	(United States) Tom Gorman	(United Kingdom) Chris Bovett	4–6, 6–3, 6–3.
1970	(Mexico) Juan Arredondo	(Bolivia) Ramiro Benavides	6–4, 4–6, 6–3.
1971	(Mexico) Joaquín Loyo-Mayo (4)	(Mexico) Vicente Zarazúa	7–5, 6–3.
1972	(Mexico) Joaquín Loyo-Mayo (5)	(Mexico) Raul Ramirez	6–2, 6–2.
1973	(United States) Raz Reid	(United States) William Brown	7–5, 6–4.
1974	(Mexico) Joaquín Loyo-Mayo (6)	(Mexico) Roberto Chávez	6–3, 6–4.
1975	(Mexico) Vicente Zarazúa	(Mexico) Luis Baraldi	4–6, 7–6, 6–4.
1976	(Mexico) Luis Baraldi	(Mexico) Joaquín Loyo-Mayo	7–5, 4–6, 6–3.
1977	(United States) Chris Sylvan	(Mexico) Marcelo Lara	7–6, 6–4.
1978	(Venezuela) Humphrey Hose	(Australia) Steve Docherty	7–5, 6–3.
1980	(Mexico) Adolfo Gonzalez	(Mexico) Guillermo Stevens	6–4, 6–4.
1981	(United States) Rick Fagel	(United States) Steve Meister	7–6, 6–1.
1984	(United States) Tim Wilkison	(Mexico) Javier Contreras	6–2, 6–2
1988	(Australia) Peter Doohan	(Mexico) Agustín Moreno	6–4, 6–4
1989	(Mexico) Jorge Lozano	(Australia) Peter Doohan	6–4, 6–4
1990	(Germany) Ricki Osterthun	(United States) MaliVai Washington	6–4, 6–4
1991	(Peru) Pablo Arraya	(Australia) Jamie Morgan	6–1, 5–7, 6–3
1992	(Mexico) Leonardo Lavalle	(United States) Francisco Montana	6–0, 6–7, 6–4
1993	(Austria) Horst Skoff	(Mexico) Luis Herrera	2–6, 6–2, 6–2
1994	(Venezuela) Nicolás Pereira	(Mexico) Luis Herrera	6–7, 6–2, 6–2
1995–1997	Not held		
1998	(Ecuador) Luis Morejón	(Argentina) Andrés Zingman	6–1, 2–6, 6–4
1999	No Draw Information Available		
2000	(Argentina) Agustín Calleri	(Argentina) Mariano Hood	7–5, 6–4
2001	(Argentina) Martín Rodríguez	(Czech Republic) Ota Fukárek	6–7(7), 7–6(2), 7–6(8)
2002	(Belgium) Dick Norman	(France) Paul-Henri Mathieu	2–6, 6–2, 6–4
2003	(Belgium) Dick Norman (2)	(Argentina) Federico Browne	7–5, 0–6, 6–4
2004	(Argentina) Mariano Delfino	(Argentina) Sergio Roitman	6–4, 6–4
2005	(Spain) Fernando Vicente	(Belgium) Dick Norman	6–4, 6–4
2006	(Austria) Rainer Eitzinger	(Italy) Paolo Lorenzi	6–4, 6–7(5), 7–5
2007	(Spain) Fernando Vicente (2)	(Colombia) Santiago Giraldo	6–3, 6–3
2008	(Argentina) Brian Dabul	(Argentina) Mariano Puerta	walkover
2009	(Colombia) Santiago Giraldo	(Italy) Paolo Lorenzi	6–2, 6–7(3), 6–2
2010–2011	Not held		
2012	(Spain) Rubén Ramírez Hidalgo	(Italy) Paolo Lorenzi	3–6, 6–3, 6–4
2013	(Italy) Alessio di Mauro	(United States) Daniel Kosakowski	4–6, 6–3, 6–2.
2014	(Italy) Paolo Lorenzi	(Spain) Adrián Menéndez Maceiras	6–1, 6–3.
2015	(Argentina) Guido Pella	(Republic of Ireland) James McGee	6–3, 6–3.
2016	(Serbia) Peđa Krstin	(El Salvador) Marcelo Arévalo	6–4, 6–2.
2017	(Slovakia) Andrej Martin	(Spain) Adrián Menéndez Maceiras	7–5, 6–4.
2018	(El Salvador) Marcelo Arévalo	(Dominican Republic) Roberto Cid Subervi	6–3, 6–7^{(3–7)}, 6–4.
2019	(Switzerland) Marc-Andrea Hüsler	(Spain) Adrián Menéndez Maceiras	7–5, 7–6^{(7–3)}.
2020–2021	Not held		
2022	(Switzerland) Antoine Bellier	(Argentina) Renzo Olivo	6–7^{(2–7)}, 6–4, 7–5.
2023	(Chile) Tomás Barrios Vera	(Germany) Dominik Koepfer	7–6^{(8–6)}, 7–5.
2024	(Colombia) Nicolás Mejía	(Chile) Matías Soto	6–1, 5–7, 6–2
2025	(Australia) James Duckworth	(Germany) Max Wiskandt	6–1, 6–1
2026	(Colombia) Nicolás Mejía (2)	(Australia) James Duckworth	7–6^{(8–6)}, 6–2

=== Women's singles ===
Year	Champion	Runner-up	Score
2023	(Italy) Elisabetta Cocciaretto	(Italy) Sara Errani	5–7, 6–4, 7–5
2024	(Argentina) Nadia Podoroska	(United Kingdom) Francesca Jones	6–1, 6–2

=== Men's doubles ===
Year	Champions	Runners-up	Score
2026	(Australia) Jake Delaney (Australia) Tristan Schoolkate	(Argentina) Facundo Mena (Mexico) Rodrigo Pacheco Méndez	6–4, 7–6^{(7–2)}
2025	Ivan Liutarevich (United Kingdom) Marcus Willis	(United States) Trey Hilderbrand (United States) Alfredo Perez	6–3, 6–4
2024	(India) Rithvik Choudary Bollipalli (India) Niki Kaliyanda Poonacha	(Switzerland) Antoine Bellier (Switzerland) Marc-Andrea Hüsler	6–3, 6–2
2023	(Northern Mariana Islands) Colin Sinclair (Australia) Adam Walton	(Zimbabwe) Benjamin Lock (New Zealand) Rubin Statham	5–7, 6–3, [10–5]
2022	(Colombia) Nicolás Barrientos (Mexico) Miguel Ángel Reyes-Varela (3)	(Venezuela) Luis David Martínez (Brazil) Felipe Meligeni Alves	7–6^{(13–11)}, 6–2
2020–2021	not held		
2019	(El Salvador) Marcelo Arévalo (2) (Mexico) Miguel Ángel Reyes-Varela (2)	(Uruguay) Ariel Behar (Ecuador) Roberto Quiroz	1–6, 6–4, [12–10]
2018	(El Salvador) Marcelo Arévalo (1) (Mexico) Miguel Ángel Reyes-Varela (1)	(United Kingdom) Jay Clarke (Germany) Kevin Krawietz	6–1, 6–4
2017	(Ecuador) Roberto Quiroz (Brazil) Caio Zampieri	(Mexico) Hans Hach Verdugo (Spain) Adrián Menéndez Maceiras	6–4, 6–2
2016	(New Zealand) Marcus Daniell (New Zealand) Artem Sitak	(Mexico) Santiago González (Croatia) Mate Pavić	6–3, 7–6^{(7–4)}
2015	(Argentina) Guillermo Durán (Argentina) Horacio Zeballos (2)	(Peru) Sergio Galdós (Argentina) Guido Pella	7–6^{(7–4)}, 6–4
2014	(United States) Kevin King (Colombia) Juan Carlos Spir	(Spain) Adrián Menéndez Maceiras (Argentina) Agustín Velotti	6–3, 6–4
2013	(Croatia) Marin Draganja (Spain) Adrián Menéndez Maceiras	(Switzerland) Marco Chiudinelli (Germany) Peter Gojowczyk	6–4, 6–3
2012	(United States) Nicholas Monroe (Germany) Simon Stadler	(Germany) Andre Begemann (Australia) Jordan Kerr	3–6, 7–5, [10–7]
2010–2011	not held		
2009	(Mexico) Santiago González (Argentina) Horacio Zeballos (1)	(Brazil) Franco Ferreiro (Brazil) Júlio Silva	6–2, 7–6(5)
2008	(United States) Travis Parrott (Slovakia) Filip Polášek	(Netherlands Antilles) Jean-Julien Rojer (Brazil) Márcio Torres	6–2, 6–1
2007	(France) Jérémy Chardy (Brazil) Marcelo Melo	(Chile) Jorge Aguilar (Colombia) Pablo González	6–0, 6–3
2006	(Mexico) Daniel Garza (Poland) Dawid Olejniczak	(Mexico) Héctor Almada (Mexico) Víctor Romero	6–2, 6–2
2005	(Poland) Łukasz Kubot (Austria) Oliver Marach	(Argentina) Juan Pablo Brzezicki (Argentina) Juan Pablo Guzmán	6–1, 3–6, 6–3
2004	(Finland) Tuomas Ketola (Netherlands) Rogier Wassen	(Mexico) Marcello Amador (Mexico) Jorge Haro	6–2, 6–2
2003	(United States) Alex Bogomolov Jr. (Canada) Frédéric Niemeyer	(Germany) Markus Hantschk (Austria) Alexander Peya	6–4, 7–6(5)
2002	(Belgium) Dick Norman (Bulgaria) Orlin Stanoytchev	(Argentina) Ignacio Hirigoyen (Argentina) Sebastián Prieto	walkover
2001	(Argentina) Edgardo Massa (Argentina) Sergio Roitman	(Australia) Paul Hanley (Australia) Nathan Healey	6–4, 5–7, 7–6(3)
2000	(Venezuela) José de Armas (Venezuela) Jimy Szymanski	(Canada) Jocelyn Robichaud (United States) Michael Sell	5–7, 6–4, 6–2
1999	no draw information available		
1998	(Netherlands) Edwin Kempes (Netherlands) Peter Wessels	(Puerto Rico) José Frontera (Canada) Bobby Kokavec	7–6, 4–6, 7–5
1997–1995	not held		
1994	(Mexico) Oliver Fernández (Mexico) Leonardo Lavalle (4)	(Mexico) Ismael Hernández (Mexico) Luis Herrera	7–5, 7–5
1993	(Argentina) Javier Frana (Mexico) Leonardo Lavalle (3)	(United States) Francisco Montana (United States) Bryan Shelton	6–3, 4–6, 6–4
1992	(Mexico) Luis Herrera (4) (Mexico) Leonardo Lavalle (2)	(Mexico) Francisco Maciel (Mexico) Agustín Moreno	6–2, 6–2
1991	(Colombia) Mauricio Hadad (Argentina) Daniel Orsanic	(United States) Scott Patridge (United States) Kenny Thorne	6–4, 3–6, 6–3
1990	(Mexico) Leonardo Lavalle (1) (Mexico) Jorge Lozano	(Mexico) Luis Herrera (3) (Argentina) Guillermo Pérez Roldán	5–7, 6–3, 6–2
1989	(Mexico) Luis Herrera (2) (Mexico) Javier Ordaz (2)	(The Bahamas) Mark Knowles (United States) Brian Page	6–4, 6–7, 6–3
1988	(Mexico) Luis Herrera (1) (Mexico) Javier Ordaz (1)	(Mexico) Agustín Moreno (Mexico) Fernando Pérez Pascal	6–4, 6–1

=== Women's doubles ===
Year	Champions	Runners-up	Score
2023	(Spain) Aliona Bolsova (Venezuela) Andrea Gámiz	(Georgia (country)) Oksana Kalashnikova (Poland) Katarzyna Piter	7–6^{(7–5)}, 6–4
2024	(Hungary) Anna Bondár (Slovenia) Tamara Zidanšek	(Brazil) Laura Pigossi (Poland) Katarzyna Piter	walkover
