= Pablo Carreño Busta career statistics =

Career finals
Discipline	Type	Won	Lost	Total	WR
Singles	Grand Slam	–	–	–	–
Singles	ATP Finals	–	–	–	–
Singles	ATP 1000	1	0	1	1.00
Singles	ATP 500	1	2	3	0.33
Singles	ATP 250	5	3	8	0.62
Singles	Olympics	–	–	–	–
Total		7	5	12	0.58
Doubles	Grand Slam	0	1	1	0.00
Doubles	ATP Finals	–	–	–	–
Doubles	ATP 1000	1	1	2	0.50
Doubles	ATP 500	2	1	3	0.67
Doubles	ATP 250	1	2	3	0.33
Doubles	Olympics	–	–	–	–
Total		4	5	9	0.44

This is a list of the main career statistics of professional Spanish tennis player Pablo Carreño Busta.

== Performance timelines ==
Key
W	F	SF	QF	#R	RR	Q#	P#	DNQ	A	Z#	PO	G	S	B	NMS	NTI	P	NH

(W) winner; (F) finalist; (SF) semifinalist; (QF) quarterfinalist; (#R) rounds 4, 3, 2, 1; (RR) round-robin stage; (Q#) qualification round; (P#) preliminary round; (DNQ) did not qualify; (A) absent; (Z#) Davis/Fed Cup Zonal Group (with number indication) or (PO) play-off; (G) gold, (S) silver or (B) bronze Olympic/Paralympic medal; (NMS) not a Masters tournament; (NTI) not a Tier I tournament; (P) postponed; (NH) not held; (SR) strike rate (events won / competed); (W–L) win–loss record.
To avoid confusion and double counting, these charts are updated at the conclusion of a tournament or when the player's participation has ended.

Only main-draw results in ATP Tour, Grand Slam tournaments, Davis Cup/ATP Cup/Laver Cup and Olympic Games are included in win–loss records.

=== Singles ===
Tournament	2011	2012	2013	2014	2015	2016	2017	2018	2019	2020	2021	2022	2023	2024	2025	2026	SR	W–L	Win %
Grand Slam tournaments
Australian Open	A	A	A	1R	1R	1R	3R	4R	4R	3R	3R	4R	2R	A	2R	1R	0 / 12	17–12	59%
French Open	A	A	1R	1R	2R	2R	QF	3R	3R	QF	4R	1R	A	1R	2R	4R	0 / 13	21–13	62%
Wimbledon	A	A	A	1R	1R	1R	A	1R	1R	NH	1R	1R	A	A	A	2R	0 / 8	1–8	11%
US Open	A	A	A	3R	2R	3R	SF	2R	3R	SF	1R	4R	A	1R	2R	1R	0 / 12	22–12	65%
Win–loss	0–0	0–0	0–1	2–4	2–4	3–4	11–3	6–4	7–4	11–3	5–4	6–4	1–1	0–2	3–3	4–4	0 / 45	61–45	58%
Year-end championships
ATP Finals	DNQ						RR	DNQ									0 / 1	0–2	0%
National representation
Summer Olympics	NH					A	NH				B	NH		A	NH		0 / 1	5–1	83%
Davis Cup	absent					Z1	QF	SF	W	GS (Note: Edition is split into the two years due to COVID-19.)		QF	A	QF	F		1 / 6	6–9	40%
ATP 1000 tournaments
Indian Wells Open	A	A	A	1R	1R	2R	SF	4R	A	NH	3R	2R	A	A	1R	A	0 / 8	7–8	47%
Miami Open	A	A	A	1R	1R	1R	2R	SF	A	NH	A	3R	A	A	A	A	0 / 6	5–6	45%
Monte-Carlo Masters	A	A	A	3R	1R	2R	3R	A	A	NH	3R	3R	A	A	A	A	0 / 6	9–6	60%
Madrid Open	A	A	A	1R	A	2R	1R	1R	1R	NH	1R	1R	A	A	1R	2R	0 / 9	2–9	18%
Italian Open	A	A	A	1R	Q1	A	2R	QF	1R	2R	2R	2R	A	A	1R	1R	0 / 9	7–8	47%
Canadian Open	A	A	A	A	A	A	2R	2R	A	NH	A	W	A	2R	2R	1R	1 / 6	10–5	67%
Cincinnati Open	A	A	A	A	A	1R	3R	QF	3R	2R	QF	1R	A	3R	Q1	2R	0 / 9	13–9	59%
Shanghai Masters	A	A	A	A	A	1R	2R	1R	2R	NH			A	1R	A	3R	0 / 6	3–6	33%
Paris Masters	A	A	Q2	A	1R	2R	2R	1R	A	QF	2R	3R	A	A	A	Q1	0 / 7	7–7	50%
Win–loss	0–0	0–0	0–0	2–5	0–4	4–7	9–9	13–8	3–4	4–3	7–5	12–7	0–0	3–3	1–4	4–5	1 / 65	62–64	49%
Career statistics
	2011	2012	2013	2014	2015	2016	2017	2018	2019	2020	2021	2022	2023	2024	2025	2026	Career		
Tournaments	1	0	7	25	25	28	24	21	22	12	19	24	3	8	11	9	Career total: 239		
Titles	0	0	0	0	0	2	1	0	1	0	2	1	0	0	0	0	Career total: 7		
Finals	0	0	0	0	0	4	2	0	1	0	3	2	0	0	0	0	Career total: 12		
Hard win–loss	0–0	0–0	2–3	4–9	6–11	21–12	16–17	17–11	23–11	16–10	19–12	24–12	1–3	8–6	6–9	2–5	4 / 12	165–132	56%
Clay win–loss	0–1	0–0	5–4	9–15	8–12	20–12	20–9	14–10	5–9	4–2	17–4	11–9	0–0	0–1	3–6	4–3	3 / 100	120–97	55%
Grass win–loss	0–0	0–0	0–0	0–1	0–2	0–2	0–0	0–1	2–2	0–0	2–2	2–3	0–0	0–1	0–0	0–0	0 / 14	6–14	30%
Overall win–loss	0–1	0–0	7–7	13–25	14–25	41–26	36–26	31–22	30–22	20–12	38–18	37–25	1–3	8–8	9–15	6–8	7 / 237	291–243	54%
Win %	0%	–	50%	34%	36%	61%	58%	58%	58%	63%	68%	60%	25%	50%	38%	43%	54%		
Year-end ranking	136	654	64	51	67	30	10	23	27	16	20	13	606	196	89		$17,150,730		

=== Doubles ===
Tournament	2014	2015	2016	2017	2018	2019	2020	2021	2022	2023	2024	2025	2026	SR	W–L	Win%
Grand Slam tournaments
Australian Open	3R	2R	3R	SF	3R	3R	1R	1R	A	A	A	1R	A	0 / 9	13–9	59%
French Open	A	2R	2R	1R (Note: Pablo Carreño Busta and Guillermo García López walkover in the first-round match at the 2017 French Open against Paolo Lorenzi and Rogério Dutra Silva (so doesn't count as a loss).)	A	1R	A	A	A	A	1R	A		0 / 5	2–4	40%
Wimbledon	A	1R	1R	A	1R	2R	NH	A	A	A	A	A		0 / 4	1–4	20%
US Open	1R	1R	F	1R	A	2R	A	A	A	A	1R	A		0 / 6	6–6	50%
Win–loss	2–2	2–4	8–4	4–2	2–2	4–4	0–1	0–1	0–0	0–0	0–2	0–1	0–0	0 / 24	22–23	49%

== Grand Slam tournaments finals ==
=== Doubles: 1 (runner-up) ===
Result	Year	Tournament	Surface	Partner	Opponents	Score
Loss	2016	US Open	Hard	(Spain) Guillermo García López	(United Kingdom) Jamie Murray (Brazil) Bruno Soares	2–6, 3–6

== Other significant finals ==
=== Summer Olympics ===
==== Singles: 1 (bronze medal) ====
Result	Year	Tournament	Surface	Opponent	Score
Bronze	2021	Tokyo Olympics	Hard	(Serbia) Novak Djokovic	6–4, 6–7^{(6–8)}, 6–3

=== ATP 1000 tournaments ===
==== Singles: 1 (title) ====
Result	Year	Tournament	Surface	Opponent	Score
Win	2022	Canadian Open	Hard	(Poland) Hubert Hurkacz	3–6, 6–3, 6–3

==== Doubles: 2 (1 title, 1 runner-up) ====
Result	Year	Tournament	Surface	Partner	Opponents	Score
Loss	2018	Italian Open	Clay	(Portugal) João Sousa	(Colombia) Juan Sebastián Cabal (Colombia) Robert Farah	6–3, 4–6, [4–10]
Win	2020	Cincinnati Open	Hard	(Australia) Alex de Minaur	(United Kingdom) Jamie Murray (United Kingdom) Neal Skupski	6–2, 7–5

== ATP Tour finals ==
=== Singles: 12 (7 titles, 5 runner-ups) ===
Legend Grand Slam (–) ATP 1000 (1–0) ATP 500 (1–2) ATP 250 (5–3)	Finals by surface Hard (4–1) Clay (3–4) Grass (–)	Finals by setting Outdoor (6–4) Indoor (1–1)

Result	W–L	Date	Tournament	Tier	Surface	Opponent	Score
Loss	0–1	Feb 2016	Brasil Open, Brazil	ATP 250	Clay	(Uruguay) Pablo Cuevas	6–7^{(4–7)}, 3–6
Loss	0–2	May 2016	Estoril Open, Portugal	ATP 250	Clay	(Spain) Nicolás Almagro	7–6^{(8–6)}, 6–7^{(5–7)}, 3–6
Win	1–2	Aug 2016	Winston-Salem Open, United States	ATP 250	Hard	(Spain) Roberto Bautista Agut	6–7^{(6–8)}, 7–6^{(7–1)}, 6–4
Win	2–2	Oct 2016	Kremlin Cup, Russia	ATP 250	Hard (i)	(Italy) Fabio Fognini	4–6, 6–3, 6–2
Loss	2–3	Feb 2017	Rio Open, Brazil	ATP 500	Clay	(Austria) Dominic Thiem	5–7, 4–6
Win	3–3	May 2017	Estoril Open, Portugal	ATP 250	Clay	(Luxembourg) Gilles Müller	6–2, 7–6^{(7–5)}
Win	4–3	Sep 2019	Chengdu Open, China	ATP 250	Hard	(Kazakhstan) Alexander Bublik	6–7^{(5–7)}, 6–4, 7–6^{(7–3)}
Win	5–3	Apr 2021	Andalucía Open, Spain	ATP 250	Clay	(Spain) Jaume Munar	6–1, 2–6, 6–4
Win	6–3	Jul 2021	Hamburg European Open, Germany	ATP 500	Clay	(Serbia) Filip Krajinović	6–2, 6–4
Loss	6–4	Sep 2021	Moselle Open, France	ATP 250	Hard (i)	(Poland) Hubert Hurkacz	6–7^{(2–7)}, 3–6
Loss	6–5	Apr 2022	Barcelona Open, Spain	ATP 500	Clay	(Spain) Carlos Alcaraz	3–6, 2–6
Win	7–5	Aug 2022	Canadian Open, Canada	ATP 1000	Hard	(Poland) Hubert Hurkacz	3–6, 6–3, 6–3

=== Doubles: 9 (4 titles, 5 runner-ups) ===
Legend Grand Slam (0–1) ATP 1000 (1–1) ATP 500 (2–1) ATP 250 (1–2)	Finals by surface Hard (3–2) Clay (1–3) Grass (–)	Finals by setting Outdoor (4–5) Indoor (–)

Result	W–L	Date	Tournament	Tier	Surface	Partner	Opponents	Score
Win	1–0	Feb 2016	Ecuador Open, Ecuador	ATP 250	Clay	(Argentina) Guillermo Durán	(Brazil) Thomaz Bellucci (Brazil) Marcelo Demoliner	7–5, 6–4
Loss	1–1	Feb 2016	Rio Open, Brazil	ATP 500	Clay	(Spain) David Marrero	(Colombia) Juan Sebastián Cabal (Colombia) Robert Farah	6–7^{(5–7)}, 1–6
Loss	1–2	Feb 2016	Brasil Open, Brazil	ATP 250	Clay	(Spain) David Marrero	(Chile) Julio Peralta (Argentina) Horacio Zeballos	6–4, 1–6, [5–10]
Loss	1–3	Sep 2016	US Open, United States	Grand Slam	Hard	(Spain) Guillermo García López	(United Kingdom) Jamie Murray (Brazil) Bruno Soares	2–6, 3–6
Loss	1–4	Oct 2016	Chengdu Open, China	ATP 250	Hard	(Poland) Mariusz Fyrstenberg	(South Africa) Raven Klaasen (United States) Rajeev Ram	6–7^{(2–7)}, 5–7
Win	2–4	Oct 2016	China Open, China	ATP 500	Hard	(Spain) Rafael Nadal	(United States) Jack Sock (Australia) Bernard Tomic	6–7^{(6–8)}, 6–2, [10–8]
Win	3–4	Feb 2017	Rio Open, Brazil	ATP 500	Hard	(Uruguay) Pablo Cuevas	(Colombia) Juan Sebastián Cabal (Colombia) Robert Farah	6–4, 5–7, [10–8]
Loss	3–5	May 2018	Italian Open, Italy	ATP 1000	Clay	(Portugal) João Sousa	(Colombia) Juan Sebastián Cabal (Colombia) Robert Farah	6–3, 4–6, [4–10]
Win	4–5	Aug 2020	Cincinnati Open, United States	ATP 1000	Hard	(Australia) Alex de Minaur	(United Kingdom) Jamie Murray (United Kingdom) Neal Skupski	6–2, 7–5

== National representation ==
Result	Date	Tournament	Surface	Team	Partners (if)	Opponent team	Opponent players	Score
Win	Nov 2019	Davis Cup, Madrid	Hard (i)	Spain	Rafael Nadal; Roberto Bautista Agut; Feliciano López; Marcel Granollers	Canada	Denis Shapovalov; Félix Auger-Aliassime; Vasek Pospisil; Brayden Schnur	2–0
Loss	Jan 2020	ATP Cup, Sydney	Hard	Spain	Rafael Nadal; Roberto Bautista Agut; Albert Ramos Viñolas; Feliciano López	Serbia	Novak Djokovic; Dušan Lajović; Nikola Milojević; Viktor Troicki; Nikola Ćaćić	1–2
Loss	Jan 2022	ATP Cup, Sydney	Hard	Spain	Roberto Bautista Agut; Albert Ramos Viñolas; Alejandro Davidovich Fokina; Pedro Martínez	Canada	Félix Auger-Aliassime; Denis Shapovalov; Brayden Schnur; Steven Diez	0–2
Loss	Nov 2025	Davis Cup, Bologna	Hard (i)	Spain	Jaume Munar; Pedro Martínez; Marcel Granollers	Italy	Flavio Cobolli; Lorenzo Sonego; Matteo Berrettini; Andrea Vavassori; Simone Bolelli	0–2

== ATP Challenger and ITF Tour finals ==
=== Singles: 37 (27 titles, 10 runner–ups) ===
Legend ATP Challenger Tour (15–3) ITF Futures (12–7)	Finals by surface Hard (8–4) Clay (18–6) Carpet (1–0)

Result	W–L	Date	Tournament	Tier	Surface	Opponent	Score
Win	1–0	May 2011	Alessandria Challenger, Italy	Challenger	Clay	(Spain) Roberto Bautista Agut	3–6, 6–3, 7–5
Win	2–0	Aug 2011	Como Challenger, Italy	Challenger	Clay	(Germany) Andreas Beck	6–4, 7–6^{(4)}
Win	3–0	Jun 2013	Morocco Tennis Tour, Morocco	Challenger	Clay	(Kazakhstan) Mikhail Kukushkin	6–2, 4–1 ret.
Win	4–0	Jul 2013	Castilla Open, Spain	Challenger	Hard	(France) Albano Olivetti	6–4, 7–6^{(2)}
Win	5–0	Aug 2013	Friuladria Tennis Cup, Italy	Challenger	Hard	(France) Grégoire Burquier	6–4, 6–4
Win	6–0	Aug 2013	Como Challenger, Italy (2)	Challenger	Clay	(Austria) Dominic Thiem	6–2, 5–7, 6–0
Win	7–0	Jun 2014	Caltanissetta Challenger, Italy	Challenger	Clay	(Argentina) Facundo Bagnis	4–6, 6–4, 6–1
Win	8–0	Jun 2014	Mohammedia Open, Morocco	Challenger	Clay	(Spain) Daniel Muñoz de la Nava	7–6^{(2)}, 2–6, 6–2
Win	9–0	Sep 2014	Copa Seville, Spain	Challenger	Clay	(Japan) Taro Daniel	6–4, 6–1
Win	10–0	Jun 2015	Perugia Tennis Cup, Italy	Challenger	Clay	(Italy) Matteo Viola	6–2, 6–2
Win	11–0	Jul 2015	Poznań Open, Poland	Challenger	Clay	(Moldova) Radu Albot	6–4, 6–4
Loss	11–1	Sep 2015	Copa Seville, Spain	Challenger	Clay	(Argentina) Pedro Cachín	5–7, 3–6
Win	12–1	Feb 2025	Tenerife Challenger, Spain	Challenger	Hard	(Spain) Alejandro Moro Cañas	6–3, 6–2
Win	13–1	Feb 2025	Tenerife Challenger 2, Spain	Challenger	Hard	(Austria) Filip Misolic	6–3, 6–2
Win	14–1	Sep 2025	Villena Open, Spain	Challenger	Hard	(France) Hugo Grenier	4–6, 6–1, 6–4
Loss	14–2	Oct 2025	Olbia Challenger, Italy	Challenger	Hard	(France) Luca Van Assche	6–7^{(5–7)}, 7–6^{(7–1)}, 2–6
Win	15–2	Mar 2026	Murcia Open, Spain	Challenger	Clay	(Spain) Roberto Carballés Baena	6–4, 6–3
Loss	15–3	Mar 2026	Montemar Ene Construcción, Spain	Challenger	Clay	(Spain) Pablo Llamas Ruiz	4–6, 2–6
Win	1–0	Jun 2009	F22 Melilla, Spain	Futures	Hard	(Spain) Andoni Vivanco-Guzmán	6–4, 6–4
Loss	1–1	Mar 2010	F1 Zaragoza, Spain	Futures	Clay	(Spain) Daniel Muñoz de la Nava	3–6, 4–6
Win	2–1	Apr 2010	F11 Madrid, Spain	Futures	Hard	(Latvia) Kārlis Lejnieks	7–5, 6–7^{(5)}, 6–3
Loss	2–2	Aug 2010	F27 Dénia, Spain	Futures	Clay	(Spain) Miguel Ángel López Jaén	6–7^{(5)}, 7–5, 3–6
Loss	2–3	Sep 2010	F32 Oviedo, Spain	Futures	Hard	(Spain) Roberto Carballés Baena	4–6, 2–6
Loss	2–4	Oct 2010	F36 Córdoba, Spain	Futures	Hard	(Tunisia) Malek Jaziri	4–6, 7–5, 4–6
Win	3–4	Jan 2011	F2 Mallorca, Spain	Futures	Clay	(Spain) Pedro Clar-Roselló	2–6, 6–2, 6–3
Loss	3–5	Jan 2011	F3 Mallorca, Spain	Futures	Clay	(Spain) Pedro Clar-Roselló	5–7, 1–6
Win	4–5	Feb 2011	F5 Murcia, Spain	Futures	Clay	(Spain) Pablo Santos	1–0, ret.
Loss	4–6	Feb 2011	F6 Cartagena, Spain	Futures	Clay	(Spain) Pedro Clar-Roselló	3–6, 6–7^{(2)}
Win	5–6	Aug 2011	F28 Irun, Spain	Futures	Clay	(Argentina) Martín Alund	6–4, 6–7^{(4)}, 6–4
Loss	5–7	Jan 2013	F2 Antalya, Turkey	Futures	Hard	(Serbia) Ilija Bozoljac	4–6, 4–6
Win	6–7	Jan 2013	F3 Antalya, Turkey	Futures	Hard	(Croatia) Toni Androić	6–3, 6–2
Win	7–7	Feb 2013	F1 Mallorca, Spain	Futures	Clay	(Italy) Alessio di Mauro	6–1, 6–1
Win	8–7	Feb 2013	F2 Mallorca, Spain	Futures	Clay	(Japan) Taro Daniel	6–3, 5–7, 6–1
Win	9–7	Feb 2013	F3 Murcia, Spain	Futures	Clay	(Spain) Roberto Carballés Baena	6–7^{(7)}, 6–3, 6–3
Win	10–7	Mar 2013	F4 Cartagena, Spain	Futures	Clay	(Spain) Roberto Carballés Baena	6–1, 6–0
Win	11–7	Mar 2013	F6 Badalona, Spain	Futures	Clay	(Spain) Jordi Samper Montaña	2–6, 6–1, 7–6
Win	12–7	Mar 2013	F7 Villajoyosa, Spain	Futures	Carpet (i)	(Spain) Roberto Carballés Baena	6–3, 6–7^{(3)}, 6–3

== ATP Tour career earnings ==
Year	Grand Slam singles titles	ATP singles titles	Total singles titles	Earnings ($)
2008	0	0	0	294
2009	0	0	0	6,859
2010	0	0	0	13,879
2011	0	0	0	49,834
2012	0	0	0	7,191
2013	0	0	0	175,465
2014	0	0	0	532,333
2015	0	0	0	427,994
2016	0	2	2	990,822
2017	0	1	1	2,553,481
2018	0	0	0	1,622,247
2019	0	1	1	1,275,369
2020	0	0	0	1,640,297
2021	0	2	2	1,284,265
2022	0	1	1	2,842,960
2023	0	0	0	143,059
2024	0	0	0	427,009
2025	0	0	0	838,542
2026	0	0	0	199,754
Career	0	7	7	$17,150,730

* Statistics correct as of 2 March 2026.

== Grand Slam seedings ==
Year	Australian Open	French Open	Wimbledon	US Open
2013	absent	qualifier	absent	absent
2014	unseeded	unseeded	unseeded	unseeded
2015	unseeded	unseeded	unseeded	unseeded
2016	unseeded	unseeded	unseeded	unseeded
2017	30th	20th	absent	12th
2018	10th	10th	20th	12th
2019	23rd	unseeded	unseeded	unseeded
2020	27th	17th	Not Held	20th
2021	15th	12th	11th	9th
2022	19th	16th	16th	12th
2023	14th	absent	absent	absent
2024	absent	PR	absent	PR
2025	PR	unseeded	absent	unseeded
2026	unseeded			

== Wins over top 10 players ==
- Carreño Busta is currently 11–45 (19.64%) against top 10 players who were in the top 10 at the moment of the match.

He got his first win against a top 10 player after 17 attempts.

Season	2017	2018	2019	2020	2021	2022	Total
Wins	1	2	1	2	3	2	11

#	Player	Rank	Event	Surface	Rd	Score	PCBR
2017
1.	(Canada) Milos Raonic	6	French Open, France	Clay	4R	4–6, 7–6^{(2)}, 6–7^{(6)}, 6–4, 8–6	21
2018
2.	(South Africa) Kevin Anderson	8	Miami Open, United States	Hard	QF	6–4, 5–7, 7–6^{(6)}	19
3.	(Bulgaria) Grigor Dimitrov	5	Barcelona Open, Spain	Clay	QF	6–3, 7–6^{(4)}	11
2019
4.	(Italy) Fabio Fognini	10	Hamburg Open, Germany	Clay	QF	3–6, 6–2, 7–6^{(4)}	59
2020
5.	(Serbia) Novak Djokovic	1	US Open, United States	Hard	4R	6–5 (defaulted)	27
6.	(Spain) Roberto Bautista Agut	10	French Open, France	Clay	3R	6–4, 6–3, 5–7, 6–4	21
2021
7.	(Argentina) Diego Schwartzman	9	Barcelona Open, Spain	Clay	QF	6–4, 3–6, 7–5	12
8.	(Russia) Daniil Medvedev	2	Tokyo Olympics, Japan	Hard	QF	6–2, 7–6^{(5)}	11
9.	(Serbia) Novak Djokovic	1	Tokyo Olympics, Japan	Hard	SF-B	6–4, 6–7^{(6)}, 6–3	11
2022
10.	(Norway) Casper Ruud	7	Barcelona Open, Spain	Clay	QF	4–6, 7–6^{(8)}, 6–3	19
11.	(Poland) Hubert Hurkacz	10	Canadian Open, Canada	Hard	F	3–6, 6–3, 6–3	23

== See also ==
- List of male singles tennis players
- Spain Davis Cup team
- ATP Finals appearances
- Tennis in Spain
- Sport in Spain
