= 2015 Morocco Tennis Tour – Mohammedia – Doubles =

Mohammedia – Doubles
- 2015 Morocco Tennis Tour – Mohammedia
- 2014 Champions: (Brazil) Fabiano de Paula; (Egypt) Mohamed Safwat

Events
Singles	Doubles
← 2014 ·	Morocco Tennis Tour – Mohammedia	· 2016 →

Fabiano de Paula and Mohamed Safwat are the defending champions, but decided not to defend their title.

== Seeds ==
1. (United States) James Cerretani / (United States) Matt Seeberger (first round)
2. (Spain) Íñigo Cervantes / (Netherlands) Mark Vervoort (champions)
3. (Poland) Tomasz Bednarek / (Poland) Mateusz Kowalczyk (quarterfinals)
4. (Italy) Federico Gaio / (Italy) Alessandro Giannessi (semifinals)

== Draw ==
=== Key ===
- Q = Qualifier
- WC = Wild card
- LL = Lucky loser
- Alt = Alternate
- SE = Special exempt
- PR = Protected ranking
- ITF = ITF entry
- JE = Junior exempt
- w/o = Walkover
- r = Retired
- d = Defaulted
- SR = Special ranking

First round

Quarterfinals

Semifinals

Final

1
- (United States) J Cerretani
- (United States) M Seeberger
6^{5}
6
[3]

- (Italy) S Caruso
- (Italy) M Cecchinato
7^{7}
2
[10]

- (Italy) S Caruso
- (Italy) M Cecchinato
4
2

- (Italy) L Giustino
- (Spain) D Pérez Sanz
0
2

- (Spain) R Carballés Baena
- (Spain) P Carreño
6
6

- (Spain) R Carballés Baena
- (Spain) P Carreño
6
6

- (Spain) R Carballés Baena
- (Spain) P Carreño
6
3
[10]

4
- (Italy) F Gaio
- (Italy) A Giannessi
6
6

4
- (Italy) F Gaio
- (Italy) A Giannessi
4
6
[5]

- (Netherlands) T de Bakker
- (Netherlands) S Fransen
1
2

4
- (Italy) F Gaio
- (Italy) A Giannessi
7^{7}
6

- (Argentina) P Cachin
- (Poland) G Panfil
6
7^{9}

- (Argentina) P Cachin
- (Poland) G Panfil
6^{5}
3

- (France) M Bourgue
- (France) M Hamou
4
6^{7}

- (Spain) R Carballés Baena
- (Spain) P Carreño
6
6^{2}
[10]

- (Bosnia and Herzegovina) T Brkić
- (Bosnia and Herzegovina) D Džumhur
6
3
[10]

2
- (Spain) Í Cervantes
- (Netherlands) M Vervoort
3
7^{7}
[12]

- (Serbia) L Djere
- (Austria) G Melzer
2
6
[6]

- (Bosnia and Herzegovina) T Brkić
- (Bosnia and Herzegovina) D Džumhur
6
2
[10]

WC
- (Morocco) H Khaddari
- (Morocco) Y Rachidi
0
1

3
- (Poland) T Bednarek
- (Poland) M Kowalczyk
2
6
[5]

3
- (Poland) T Bednarek
- (Poland) M Kowalczyk
6
6

- (Bosnia and Herzegovina) T Brkić
- (Bosnia and Herzegovina) D Džumhur
6
2
[8]

- (Morocco) L Ouahab
- (Spain) O Roca Batalla
6
6

2
- (Spain) Í Cervantes
- (Netherlands) M Vervoort
2
6
[10]

WC
- (Morocco) Y Idmbarek
- (Morocco) M Jdi
2
1

- (Morocco) L Ouahab
- (Spain) O Roca Batalla
4
6^{2}

WC
(Morocco) M Saber
(Morocco) Taha Tifnouti
0
1

2
- (Spain) Í Cervantes
- (Netherlands) M Vervoort
6
7^{7}

2
- (Spain) Í Cervantes
- (Netherlands) M Vervoort
6
6
