= 2015 Morocco Tennis Tour – Mohammedia – Singles =

Mohammedia – Singles
- 2015 Morocco Tennis Tour – Mohammedia
- 2014 Champion: (Spain) Pablo Carreño

Events
Singles	Doubles
← 2014 ·	Morocco Tennis Tour – Mohammedia	· 2016 →

Pablo Carreño is the defending champion.

== Seeds ==
1. (Spain) Pablo Carreño Busta (semifinals)
2. (Argentina) Federico Delbonis (quarterfinals)
3. (Bosnia and Herzegovina) Damir Džumhur (first round)
4. (Italy) Marco Cecchinato (quarterfinals)
5. (Spain) Íñigo Cervantes (second round)
6. (Spain) Albert Montañés (second round)
7. (Spain) Roberto Carballés Baena (champion)
8. (Netherlands) Thiemo de Bakker (first round)

== Draw ==
=== Key ===
- Q = Qualifier
- WC = Wild card
- LL = Lucky loser
- Alt = Alternate
- ITF = ITF entry
- PR = Protected ranking
- SR = Special ranking
- SE = Special exempt
- JE = Junior exempt
- JR = Junior Accelerator Programme entrant
- CO = College Accelerator Programme entrant
- NG = Next Gen Accelerator Program entrant
- w/o = Walkover
- r = Retired
- d = Defaulted

=== Finals ===
Semifinals
1	(Spain) Pablo Carreño Busta	1	1
Q	(Poland) Kamil Majchrzak	6	6
7	(Spain) Roberto Carballés Baena	6	6^{4}	6
Q	(Slovakia) Jozef Kovalík	4	7^{7}	2

Final
Q	(Poland) Kamil Majchrzak	6^{4}	2
7	(Spain) Roberto Carballés Baena	7^{7}	6

=== Top half ===
First round
1	(Spain) P Carreño Busta	6	6
(Spain) D Pérez Sanz	3	1
(Morocco) L Ouahab	6	6
WC	(Morocco) H Khaddari	1	1
(Italy) A Giannessi	6^{3}	6	6
(Austria) G Melzer	7^{7}	4	3
(Argentina) P Cachin	4	0
6	(Spain) A Montañés	6	6
4	(Italy) M Cecchinato	6	6
(Italy) M Viola	2	4
(Spain) O Roca Batalla	6^{4}	7^{7}	6
(Italy) L Giustino	7^{7}	6^{1}	3
(France) M Bourgue	2	2
Q	(Poland) K Majchrzak	6	6
Q	(Serbia) L Djere	5	6	6^{5}
5	(Spain) Í Cervantes	7	4	7^{7}

Second round
1	(Spain) P Carreño Busta	6	6
(Morocco) L Ouahab	3	4
(Italy) A Giannessi	6	7^{7}
6	(Spain) A Montañés	3	6^{3}
4	(Italy) M Cecchinato	6	6
(Spain) O Roca Batalla	3	2
Q	(Poland) K Majchrzak	6	6
5	(Spain) Í Cervantes	2	3

Quarterfinals
1	(Spain) P Carreño Busta	7	3	7^{7}
(Italy) A Giannessi	5	6	6^{4}
4	(Italy) M Cecchinato	1	4
Q	(Poland) K Majchrzak	6	6

Semifinals
1	(Spain) P Carreño Busta	1	1
Q	(Poland) K Majchrzak	6	6

=== Bottom half ===
First round
7	(Spain) R Carballés Baena	7	6
(Italy) F Gaio	5	1
(Bosnia and Herzegovina) T Brkić	6^{5}	7^{9}	6
(France) M Hamou	7^{7}	6^{7}	4
WC	(Morocco) Taha Tifnouti	0	1
Q	(Greece) S Tsitsipas	6	6
(Spain) R Ramírez Hidalgo	6	6
3	(Bosnia and Herzegovina) D Džumhur	0	4
8	(Netherlands) T de Bakker	3	6^{4}
WC	(Spain) J Munar	6	7^{7}
Q	(Slovakia) J Kovalík	6	6
(Poland) G Panfil	3	4
WC	(Morocco) Y Idmbarek	2	4
(Italy) S Caruso	6	6
LL	(Italy) Claudio Fortuna	4	2
2	(Argentina) F Delbonis	6	6

Second round
7	(Spain) R Carballés Baena	6	6
(Bosnia and Herzegovina) T Brkić	1	3
Q	(Greece) S Tsitsipas	6	6^{9}	6^{6}
(Spain) R Ramírez Hidalgo	3	7^{11}	7^{8}
WC	(Spain) J Munar	6^{4}	1
Q	(Slovakia) J Kovalík	7^{7}	6
(Italy) S Caruso	2	3
2	(Argentina) F Delbonis	6	6

Quarterfinals
7	(Spain) R Carballés Baena	6	3
(Spain) R Ramírez Hidalgo	0	0^{r}
Q	(Slovakia) J Kovalík	6	6^{6}	6
2	(Argentina) F Delbonis	3	7^{8}	1

Semifinals
7	(Spain) R Carballés Baena	6	6^{4}	6
Q	(Slovakia) J Kovalík	4	7^{2}	2
