= 2016 Morocco Tennis Tour – Mohammedia – Singles =

Mohammedia – Singles
- 2016 Morocco Tennis Tour – Mohammedia

Final
- Champion: (Austria) Gerald Melzer
- Runner-up: (Greece) Stefanos Tsitsipas
- Score: 3–6, 6–3, 6–2

Events
Singles	Doubles
← 2015 ·	Morocco Tennis Tour – Mohammedia	· 2017 →

Roberto Carballés Baena was the defending champion but lost in the quarterfinals to Uladzimir Ignatik.

Gerald Melzer won the title after defeating Stefanos Tsitsipas 3–6, 6–3, 6–2 in the final.

== Seeds ==
1. (Bosnia and Herzegovina) Damir Džumhur (quarterfinals)
2. (Austria) Gerald Melzer (champion)
3. (Spain) Daniel Gimeno Traver (quarterfinals, retired)
4. (Spain) Roberto Carballés Baena (quarterfinals)
5. (Slovakia) Andrej Martin (quarterfinals)
6. (Belgium) Arthur De Greef (first round)
7. (Netherlands) Thiemo de Bakker (second round)
8. (Spain) Rubén Ramírez Hidalgo (second round)

== Draw ==
=== Key ===
- Q = Qualifier
- WC = Wild card
- LL = Lucky loser
- Alt = Alternate
- ITF = ITF entry
- PR = Protected ranking
- SR = Special ranking
- SE = Special exempt
- JE = Junior exempt
- JR = Junior Accelerator Programme entrant
- CO = College Accelerator Programme entrant
- NG = Next Gen Accelerator Program entrant
- w/o = Walkover
- r = Retired
- d = Defaulted

=== Finals ===
Semifinals
(Poland) Kamil Majchrzak	6^{4}	4
WC	(Greece) Stefanos Tsitsipas	7^{7}	6
(Belarus) Uladzimir Ignatik	2	5
2	(Austria) Gerald Melzer	6	7

Final
WC	(Greece) Stefanos Tsitsipas	6	3	2
2	(Austria) Gerald Melzer	3	6	6

=== Top half ===
First round
1	(Bosnia and Herzegovina) D Džumhur	6	6
(Czech Republic) Robin Staněk	1	3
(Spain) J Samper Montaña	6	1	2
SE	(Sweden) M Ymer	1	6	6
(Poland) K Majchrzak	6	7^{7}
(Serbia) P Krstin	3	6^{1}
(Austria) D Novak	6	4	6^{8}
7	(Netherlands) T de Bakker	3	6	7^{10}
3	(Spain) D Gimeno Traver	6	6
WC	(Morocco) A Ahouda	0	1
(Kazakhstan) D Popko	6	6
Q	(Serbia) M Zekić	3	2
WC	(Greece) S Tsitsipas	7^{7}	6^{4}	6
(Egypt) M Safwat	6^{3}	7^{7}	4
(Germany) Jeremy Jahn	2	2
8	(Spain) R Ramírez Hidalgo	6	6

Second round
1	(Bosnia and Herzegovina) D Džumhur	6	6
SE	(Sweden) M Ymer	3	3
(Poland) K Majchrzak	6	3	6
7	(Netherlands) T de Bakker	3	6	3
3	(Spain) D Gimeno Traver	6	6
(Kazakhstan) D Popko	4	2
WC	(Greece) S Tsitsipas	2	6	6
8	(Spain) R Ramírez Hidalgo	6	3	2

Quarterfinals
1	(Bosnia and Herzegovina) D Džumhur	4	6	1
(Poland) K Majchrzak	6	3	6
3	(Spain) D Gimeno Traver	6	3^{r}
WC	(Greece) S Tsitsipas	4	5

Semifinals
(Poland) K Majchrzak	6^{4}	4
WC	(Greece) S Tsitsipas	7^{7}	6

=== Bottom half ===
First round
6	(Belgium) A De Greef	0	4
(Serbia) L Đere	6	6
(Belarus) U Ignatik	6	7
(Canada) S Diez	4	5
(Sweden) E Ymer	6	6
WC	(Morocco) M Jdi	3	2
WC	(Morocco) Y Idmbarek	0	0^{r}
4	(Spain) R Carballés Baena	6	0
5	(Slovakia) A Martin	7^{7}	6
(Italy) S Napolitano	6^{2}	2
Q	(France) M Janvier	4	1
Q	(Spain) O Roca Batalla	6	6
(Norway) C Ruud	6	6
Q	(Germany) O Otte	2	1
(Chile) C Garín	2	1
2	(Austria) G Melzer	6	6

Second round
(Serbia) L Đere	3	2
(Belarus) U Ignatik	6	6
(Sweden) E Ymer	2	1
4	(Spain) R Carballés Baena	6	6
5	(Slovakia) A Martin	6	6
Q	(Spain) O Roca Batalla	4	3
(Norway) C Ruud	1	0
2	(Austria) G Melzer	6	6

Quarterfinals
(Belarus) U Ignatik	6	6
4	(Spain) R Carballés Baena	1	4
5	(Slovakia) A Martin	3	1
2	(Austria) G Melzer	6	6

Semifinals
(Belarus) U Ignatik	2	5
2	(Austria) G Melzer	6	7
