= 2014 Morocco Tennis Tour – Mohammedia – Doubles =

Mohammedia – Doubles
- 2014 Morocco Tennis Tour – Mohammedia

Final
- Champion: (Brazil) Fabiano de Paula (Egypt) Mohamed Safwat
- Runner-up: (Germany) Richard Becker (France) Élie Rousset
- Score: 6–2, 3–6, [10–6]

Events
| Singles | Doubles |
| Morocco Tennis Tour – Mohammedia | · 2015 → |

This was the first edition of the tournament.

Fabiano de Paula and Mohamed Safwat won the title, defeating Richard Becker and Élie Rousset in the final, 6–2, 3–6, [10–6].

== Seeds ==
1. (Italy) Riccardo Ghedin / (Netherlands) Antal van der Duim (quarterfinals, withdrew)
2. (Philippines) Ruben Gonzales / (Venezuela) Roberto Maytín (first round)
3. (Chile) Nicolás Jarry / (Italy) Walter Trusendi (withdrew)
4. (Brazil) Guilherme Clezar / (Brazil) Ricardo Hocevar (semifinals)

== Draw ==
=== Key ===
- Q = Qualifier
- WC = Wild card
- LL = Lucky loser
- Alt = Alternate
- ITF = ITF entry
- PR = Protected ranking
- SR = Special ranking
- SE = Special exempt
- JE = Junior exempt
- JR = Junior Accelerator Programme entrant
- CO = College Accelerator Programme entrant
- NG = Next Gen Accelerator Program entrant
- w/o = Walkover
- r = Retired
- d = Defaulted

=== Draw ===
First round
1 | (Italy) R Ghedin (Netherlands) A van der Duim | 6 | 4 | [10]
WC | (Morocco) Mohamed Adnaoui (Morocco) Mamoun El Abbar | 1 | 2 | [2]
(Serbia) P Krstin (Slovakia) Adrian Sikora | 3^{r}
(Egypt) K Hossam (Egypt) S Sabry | 3
3 | (Chile) N Jarry (Italy) W Trusendi | w/o
(France) Jules Marie (France) M Vaïsse
(Brazil) F de Paula (Egypt) M Safwat | 3^{7} | 7 | 10
(United States) Adham El-Effendi (United Kingdom) D Walsh | 6^{4} | 6 | 8
(Australia) J Kubler (Venezuela) R Rodríguez | 3 | 4
(Spain) Juan-Samuel Arauzo-Martínez (Spain) RC Baena | 6 | 6
WC | (Morocco) M Jdi (Morocco) Y Rachidi | 1 | 0
4 | (Brazil) G Clezar (Brazil) R Hocevar | 6 | 6
Alt | (Morocco) Nizar Belmati (Morocco) Omar Erramy | 1 | 2
WC | (Morocco) A Ahouda (Morocco) Y Idmbarek | 6 | 6
(Germany) R Becker (France) Élie Rousset | 1 | 6 | [10]
2 | (Philippines) Ruben Gonzales (Venezuela) R Maytín | 6 | 4 | [7]

Quarterfinals
1 | (Italy) R Ghedin (Netherlands) A van der Duim | w/o
(Egypt) K Hossam (Egypt) S Sabry
(France) J Marie (France) M Vaïsse | w/o
(Brazil) F de Paula (Egypt) M Safwat
(Spain) J-S Arauzo-Martinez (Spain) RC Baena | w/o
4 | (Brazil) G Clezar (Brazil) R Hocevar
WC | (Morocco) A Ahouda (Morocco) Y Idmbarek | 6 | 6^{5} | [4]
(Germany) R Becker (France) É Rousset | 3 | 7^{7} | [10]

Semifinals
(Egypt) K Hossam (Egypt) S Sabry | 1 | 1
(Brazil) F de Paula (Egypt) M Safwat | 6 | 6
4 | (Brazil) G Clezar (Brazil) R Hocevar | 6 | 1 | [6]
(Germany) R Becker (France) É Rousset | 4 | 6 | [10]

Final
(Brazil) F de Paula (Egypt) M Safwat | 6 | 3 | [10]
(Germany) R Becker (France) É Rousset | 2 | 6 | [6]
