= 2016 Morocco Tennis Tour – Mohammedia – Doubles =

Mohammedia – Doubles
- 2016 Morocco Tennis Tour – Mohammedia

Final
- Champions: (Croatia) Dino Marcan; (Croatia) Antonio Šančić
- Runners-up: (Czech Republic) Roman Jebavý; (Slovakia) Andrej Martin
- Score: 7–6^{(7–3)}, 6–4

Events
Singles	Doubles
← 2015 ·	Morocco Tennis Tour – Mohammedia	· 2017 →

Íñigo Cervantes and Mark Vervoort were the defending champions but chose not to defend their title.

Dino Marcan and Antonio Šančić won the title after defeating Roman Jebavý and Andrej Martin 7–6^{(7–3)}, 6–4 in the final.

== Seeds ==
1. (Czech Republic) Roman Jebavý / (Slovakia) Andrej Martin (final)
2. (Poland) Tomasz Bednarek / (Australia) Rameez Junaid (semifinals)
3. (Croatia) Dino Marcan / (Croatia) Antonio Šančić (champions)
4. (Italy) Riccardo Ghedin / (Italy) Alessandro Motti (first round)

== Draw ==
=== Key ===
- Q = Qualifier
- WC = Wild card
- LL = Lucky loser
- Alt = Alternate
- SE = Special exempt
- PR = Protected ranking
- ITF = ITF entry
- JE = Junior exempt
- w/o = Walkover
- r = Retired
- d = Defaulted
- SR = Special ranking

First round

Quarterfinals

Semifinals

Final

1
- (Czech Republic) R Jebavý
- (Slovakia) A Martin
6
6

WC
- (Morocco) Ayoub Chakrouni
- (Morocco) M Jdi
2
0

1
- (Czech Republic) R Jebavý
- (Slovakia) A Martin
6
7^{7}

- (Serbia) L Đere
- (Serbia) P Krstin
6
4
[10]

- (Serbia) L Đere
- (Serbia) P Krstin
3
6^{2}

WC
- (Morocco) A Ahouda
- (Morocco) Y Idmbarek
3
6
[6]

1
- (Czech Republic) R Jebavý
- (Slovakia) A Martin
6
6

4
- (Italy) R Ghedin
- (Italy) A Motti
1
6
[7]

- (Germany) A Mies
- (Germany) O Otte
2
4

- (Switzerland) L Margaroli
- (Italy) S Napolitano
6
3
[10]

- (Switzerland) L Margaroli
- (Italy) S Napolitano
2
0

- (Germany) A Mies
- (Germany) O Otte
6
6

- (Germany) A Mies
- (Germany) O Otte
6
6

WC
(Morocco) Khalid Allouch
(Morocco) Driss L'Bahy
2
1

1
- (Czech Republic) R Jebavý
- (Slovakia) A Martin
6^{3}
4

- (Croatia) M Draganja
- (Croatia) T Draganja
6
6^{4}
[3]

3
- (Croatia) D Marcan
- (Croatia) A Šančić
7^{7}
6

Alt
(Czech Republic) V Šafránek
(Czech Republic) Robin Staněk
4
7^{7}
[10]

Alt
(Czech Republic) V Šafránek
(Czech Republic) R Staněk
4
1

- (Austria) G Melzer
- (Austria) D Novak
1
7^{7}
[6]

3
- (Croatia) D Marcan
- (Croatia) A Šančić
6
6

3
- (Croatia) D Marcan
- (Croatia) A Šančić
6
6^{3}
[10]

3
- (Croatia) D Marcan
- (Croatia) A Šančić
6^{7}
7^{7}
[10]

- (Spain) R Carballés Baena
- (Spain) J Samper Montaña
6
7

2
- (Poland) T Bednarek
- (Australia) R Junaid
7^{9}
6^{1}
[6]

- (Belarus) U Ignatik
- (Kazakhstan) D Popko
4
5

- (Spain) R Carballés Baena
- (Spain) J Samper Montaña
4
3

- (Poland) K Majchrzak
- (Serbia) M Zekić
3
6
[4]

2
- (Poland) T Bednarek
- (Australia) R Junaid
6
6

2
- (Poland) T Bednarek
- (Australia) R Junaid
6
4
[10]
