= 2014 San Marino GO&FUN Open =

- Date: 4–10 August 2014
- Edition: 27th
- Location: City of San Marino, San Marino

Champions

Singles
- (Romania) Adrian Ungur

Doubles
- (Moldova) Radu Albot / (Spain) Enrique López Pérez
← 2013 ·	San Marino GO&FUN Open	· 2021 →

The 2014 San Marino GO&FUN Open was a professional tennis tournament played on clay courts. The 27th edition of the tournament, which was part of the 2014 ATP Challenger Tour, took place in City of San Marino, San Marino between 4 and 10 August 2014.

== Singles main-draw entrants ==
=== Seeds ===
Country	Player	Rank^{1}	Seed
ITA	Simone Bolelli	89	1
ESP	Daniel Gimeno Traver	93	2
ARG	Máximo González	104	3
ESP	Albert Montañés	119	4
GER	Julian Reister	125	5
GER	Peter Gojowczyk	127	6
SRB	Filip Krajinović	134	7
ITA	Filippo Volandri	136	8

- ^{1} Rankings are as of July 28, 2014.

=== Other entrants ===
The following players received wildcards into the singles main draw:

- (Italy) Alessandro Giannessi
- (Argentina) Máximo González
- (Serbia) Filip Krajinović
- (Serbia) Viktor Troicki

The following players received a special exemption into the singles main draw:

- (Italy) Federico Gaio
- (Italy) Roberto Marcora

The following players received entry from the qualifying draw:

- (Chile) Cristian Garín
- (Ecuador) Giovanni Lapentti
- (Brazil) Wilson Leite
- (Croatia) Antonio Veić

== Champions ==
=== Singles ===
- (Romania) Adrian Ungur def. (Croatia) Antonio Veić 6–1, 6–0

=== Doubles ===
- (Moldova) Radu Albot / (Spain) Enrique López Pérez def. (Croatia) Franko Škugor / (Romania) Adrian Ungur 6–4, 6–1
