= 2013 Credit Agricole Friuladria Tennis Cup – Singles =

Singles
- 2013 Credit Agricole Friuladria Tennis Cup

Final
- Champion: (Spain) Pablo Carreño Busta
- Runner-up: (France) Grégoire Burquier
- Score: 6–4, 6–4

Events
Singles	Doubles
← 2012 ·	Credit Agricole Friuladria Tennis Cup	· 2014 →

Paolo Lorenzi was the defending champion, but was defeated in the semifinals by Pablo Carreño Busta.

Carreño Busta went on to win the title over Grégoire Burquier 6–4, 6–4 in the final.

== Seeds ==
1. (Italy) Paolo Lorenzi (semifinals)
2. (Austria) Andreas Haider-Maurer (second round)
3. (Spain) Pablo Carreño Busta (champion)
4. (Romania) Adrian Ungur (first round)
5. (Italy) Filippo Volandri (quarterfinals)
6. (Croatia) Antonio Veić (first round)
7. (Serbia) Boris Pašanski (first round)
8. (Spain) Guillermo Olaso (first round)

== Draw ==
=== Key ===
- Q = Qualifier
- WC = Wild card
- LL = Lucky loser
- Alt = Alternate
- SE = Special exempt
- PR = Protected ranking
- ITF = ITF entry
- JE = Junior exempt
- w/o = Walkover
- r = Retired
- d = Defaulted
- SR = Special ranking

=== Finals ===
Semifinals
1	(Italy) Paolo Lorenzi	6^{5}	5
3	(Spain) Pablo Carreño Busta	7^{7}	7
(France) Grégoire Burquier	6	6
(Italy) Potito Starace	3	4

Final
3	(Spain) Pablo Carreño Busta	6	6
(France) Grégoire Burquier	4	4

=== Top half ===
First round
1	(Italy) P Lorenzi	6	6
WC	(Italy) G Quinzi	1	2
(Japan) T Daniel	6	6
(Italy) A Arnaboldi	4	4
(United Kingdom) E Corrie	6	2	3
(Italy) G Naso	2	6	6
(Spain) E López-Pérez	5	6	6
8	(Spain) G Olaso	7	3	3
3	(Spain) P Carreño Busta	6	6
(Czech Republic) J Pospíšil	2	4
Q	(Croatia) M Delić	2	4
Q	(Italy) S Caruso	6	6
WC	(Italy) S Napolitano	6	3	6
(Egypt) M Safwat	4	6	3
(Slovakia) N Gombos	6	6
7	(Serbia) B Pašanski	3	1

Second round
1	(Italy) P Lorenzi	6	6
(Japan) T Daniel	4	4
(Italy) G Naso	6	6
(Spain) E López-Pérez	4	4
3	(Spain) P Carreño Busta	7^{7}	6
Q	(Italy) S Caruso	6^{5}	1
WC	(Italy) S Napolitano	1	0
(Slovakia) N Gombos	6	6

Quarterfinals
1	(Italy) P Lorenzi	6	1	7
(Italy) G Naso	3	6	5
3	(Spain) P Carreño Busta	6^{7}	6	6
(Slovakia) N Gombos	7^{9}	3	3

Semifinals
1	(Italy) P Lorenzi	6^{5}	5
3	(Spain) P Carreño Busta	7^{7}	7

=== Bottom half ===
First round
5	(Italy) F Volandri	6	6
(Spain) R Carballés Baena	4	1
(Italy) M Cecchinato	6	6
(Italy) A di Mauro	3	4
(France) G Burquier	6	6
WC	(Italy) A Virgili	2	2
(Italy) A Giannessi	3	7^{7}	6
4	(Romania) A Ungur	6	6^{2}	1
6	(Croatia) A Veić	6	4	4
Q	(Slovenia) J Semrajc	4	6	6
(Spain) J Samper-Montaña	2	6^{4}
(Netherlands) T Schoorel	6	7^{7}
(Italy) P Starace	6	6
WC	(Italy) F Baldi	2	2
Q	(Italy) Erik Crepaldi	0	4
2	(Austria) A Haider-Maurer	6	6

Second round
5	(Italy) F Volandri	7^{7}	6
(Italy) M Cecchinato	6^{1}	1
(France) G Burquier	7	6
(Italy) A Giannessi	5	3
Q	(Slovenia) J Semrajc	4	7^{12}	6
(Netherlands) T Schoorel	6	6^{10}	2
(Italy) P Starace	6	6
2	(Austria) A Haider-Maurer	4	4

Quarterfinals
5	(Italy) F Volandri	6^{1}	6	6^{6}
(France) G Burquier	7^{7}	4	7^{8}
Q	(Slovenia) J Semrajc	6	4	2
(Italy) P Starace	4	6	6

Semifinals
(France) G Burquier	6	6
(Italy) P Starace	3	4
