= 2013 Credit Agricole Friuladria Tennis Cup – Doubles =

Doubles
- 2013 Credit Agricole Friuladria Tennis Cup

Final
- Champions: (Croatia) Marin Draganja (Croatia) Franko Škugor
- Runners-up: (Slovakia) Norbert Gombos (Czech Republic) Roman Jebavý
- Score: 6–4, 6–4

Events
Singles	Doubles
← 2012 ·	Credit Agricole Friuladria Tennis Cup	· 2014 →

Lukáš Dlouhý and Michal Mertiňák were the defending champions, but decided not to participate. Marin Draganja and Franko Škugor won the title over Norbert Gombos and Roman Jebavý 6–4, 6–4

== Seeds ==
1. (Italy) Daniele Bracciali / (Romania) Florin Mergea (quarterfinals)
2. (United Kingdom) Jamie Delgado / (Poland) Mateusz Kowalczyk (first round)
3. (Sweden) Andreas Siljeström / (Slovakia) Igor Zelenay (first round)
4. (Croatia) Marin Draganja / (Croatia) Franko Škugor (champions)

== Draw ==
=== Key ===
- Q = Qualifier
- WC = Wild card
- LL = Lucky loser
- Alt = Alternate
- SE = Special exempt
- PR = Protected ranking
- ITF = ITF entry
- JE = Junior exempt
- w/o = Walkover
- r = Retired
- d = Defaulted
- SR = Special ranking

=== Draw ===
First round
1	(Italy) D Bracciali (Romania) F Mergea	6	8
(Spain) R Carballés Baena (Spain) P Carreño Busta	1	5
WC	(Italy) Luca Serena (Italy) Matthias Wolf	3	7	[1]
Alt	(Slovakia) N Gombos (Czech Republic) R Jebavý	6	5	[10]
3	(Sweden) A Siljeström (Slovakia) I Zelenay	5	6^{5}
WC	(Italy) F Baldi (Italy) S Napolitano	7	7^{7}
(Italy) A Motti (Italy) G Naso	5	6^{2}
(Italy) A Giannessi (Italy) P Starace	7	7^{7}
(Italy) M Cecchinato (Italy) A di Mauro	4	2
(Serbia) N Ćirić (Serbia) G Tošić	6	6
(Spain) E López-Pérez (Serbia) B Pašanski	1	1
4	(Croatia) M Draganja (Croatia) F Škugor	6	6
(Italy) S Ianni (Australia) J Kerr	6	6
WC	(Italy) Enrico Becuzzi (Italy) P Lorenzi	0	0
(United Kingdom) K Skupski (United Kingdom) N Skupski	3	6	[10]
2	(United Kingdom) J Delgado (Poland) M Kowalczyk	6	4	[4]

Quarterfinals
1	(Italy) D Bracciali (Romania) F Mergea	6^{5}	4
Alt	(Slovakia) N Gombos (Czech Republic) R Jebavý	7^{7}	6
WC	(Italy) F Baldi (Italy) S Napolitano	3	6	[10]
(Italy) A Giannessi (Italy) P Starace	6	3	[12]
(Serbia) N Ćirić (Serbia) G Tošić	6^{5}	4
4	(Croatia) M Draganja (Croatia) F Škugor	7^{7}	6
(Italy) S Ianni (Australia) J Kerr	6	4	[6]
(United Kingdom) K Skupski (United Kingdom) N Skupski	4	6	[10]

Semifinals
Alt	(Slovakia) N Gombos (Czech Republic) R Jebavý	6	6
(Italy) A Giannessi (Italy) P Starace	4	4
4	(Croatia) M Draganja (Croatia) F Škugor	6	6
(United Kingdom) K Skupski (United Kingdom) N Skupski	3	1

Final
Alt	(Slovakia) N Gombos (Czech Republic) R Jebavý	4	4
4	(Croatia) M Draganja (Croatia) F Škugor	6	6
