= 2015 Internazionali di Tennis del Friuli Venezia Giulia =

- Date: 15 – 23 August
- Edition: 12th
- Location: Cordenons, Italy

Champions

Singles
- (Serbia) Filip Krajinović

Doubles
- (Slovakia) Andrej Martin / (Slovakia) Igor Zelenay
← 2014 ·	Internazionali di Tennis del Friuli Venezia Giulia	· 2016 →

The 2015 Internazionali di Tennis del Friuli Venezia Giulia was a professional tennis tournament played on clay courts. It was the eleventh edition of the tournament which was part of the 2015 ATP Challenger Tour. It took place in Cordenons, Italy between 15 and 23 August 2015.

== Singles main-draw entrants ==
=== Seeds ===
Country	Player	Rank^{1}	Seed
ESP	Albert Ramos	55	1
ITA	Paolo Lorenzi	80	2
SRB	Filip Krajinović	122	3
FRA	Kenny de Schepper	143	4
SVK	Andrej Martin	159	5
ESP	Roberto Carballés Baena	168	6
ITA	Filippo Volandri	192	7
ITA	Gianluca Naso	194	8

- ^{1} Rankings are as of August 10, 2015.

=== Other entrants ===
The following players received wildcards into the singles main draw:

- (Italy) Omar Giacalone
- (Italy) Andrea Pellegrino
- (Italy) Lorenzo Sonego
- (Italy) Adelchi Virgili

The following player received entry into the singles main draw as a special exempt:

- (Slovenia) Grega Žemlja

The following player entered the singles main draw as an alternate:

- (Brazil) Fernando Romboli

The following players received entry from the qualifying draw:

- (Italy) Nicola Ghedin
- (Croatia) Nikola Mektić
- (Spain) Jaume Munar
- (Italy) Matteo Trevisan

== Champions ==
=== Singles ===
- (Serbia) Filip Krajinović def. (Romania) Adrian Ungur 5–7, 6–4, 4–1 ret.

=== Doubles ===
- (Slovakia) Andrej Martin / (Slovakia) Igor Zelenay def. (Croatia) Dino Marcan / (Croatia) Antonio Šančić 6–4, 5–7, [10–8]
