= 2015 Internazionali di Tennis del Friuli Venezia Giulia – Doubles =

Doubles
- 2015 Internazionali di Tennis del Friuli Venezia Giulia

Final
- Champions: (Slovakia) Andrej Martin (Slovakia) Igor Zelenay
- Runners-up: (Croatia) Dino Marcan (Croatia) Antonio Šančić
- Score: 6–4, 5–7, [10–8]

Events
Singles	Doubles
← 2014 ·	Internazionali di Tennis del Friuli Venezia Giulia	· 2016 →

Potito Starace and Adrian Ungur were the defending champions, but Starace did not participate this year. Ungur plays alongside Flavio Cipolla, but lost in the first round to Andrej Martin and Igor Zelenay.

Martin and Zelenay won the tournament, defeating Dino Marcan and Antonio Šančić in the final.

== Seeds ==
1. (Austria) Julian Knowle / (Austria) Philipp Oswald (quarterfinals)
2. (France) Fabrice Martin / (India) Purav Raja (semifinals)
3. (Croatia) Dino Marcan / (Croatia) Antonio Šančić (final)
4. (Italy) Flavio Cipolla / (Romania) Adrian Ungur (first round)

== Draw ==
=== Key ===
- Q = Qualifier
- WC = Wild card
- LL = Lucky loser
- Alt = Alternate
- SE = Special exempt
- PR = Protected ranking
- ITF = ITF entry
- JE = Junior exempt
- w/o = Walkover
- r = Retired
- d = Defaulted
- SR = Special ranking

First round
1	(Austria) J Knowle (Austria) P Oswald	6	6
WC	(Italy) Omar Giacalone (Italy) G Naso	3	2
(Poland) T Bednarek (United Kingdom) N Skupski	4	6	[11]
WC	(Italy) F Gaio (Italy) A Giannessi	6	2	[9]
4	(Italy) F Cipolla (Romania) A Ungur	6^{2}	6^{0}
(Slovakia) A Martin (Slovakia) I Zelenay	7^{7}	7^{7}
(Chinese Taipei) H-h Lee (Italy) A Motti	6	1	[10]
(Italy) Erik Crepaldi (Romania) P Grigoriu	1	6	[3]
(France) K de Schepper (Brazil) F Romboli	6	6
(Monaco) B Balleret (Spain) E López-Pérez	3	2
(Serbia) F Krajinović (Serbia) M Zekić	2^{r}
3	(Croatia) D Marcan (Croatia) A Šančić	2
WC	(Italy) A Pellegrino (Italy) L Sonego	2	7	[7]
(United States) J Cerretani (Romania) C Pavăl	6	5	[10]
(Argentina) P Cachin (Spain) R Carballés Baena	6^{2}	6	[8]
2	(France) F Martin (India) P Raja	7^{7}	3	[10]

Quarterfinals
1	(Austria) J Knowle (Austria) P Oswald	0	1
(Poland) T Bednarek (United Kingdom) N Skupski	6	6
(Slovakia) A Martin (Slovakia) I Zelenay	6	6
(Chinese Taipei) H-h Lee (Italy) A Motti	2	3
(France) K de Schepper (Brazil) F Romboli	4	2
3	(Croatia) D Marcan (Croatia) A Šančić	6	6
(United States) J Cerretani (Romania) C Pavăl	3	2
2	(France) F Martin (India) P Raja	6	6

Semifinals
(Poland) T Bednarek (United Kingdom) N Skupski	6^{4}	7	[9]
(Slovakia) A Martin (Slovakia) I Zelenay	7^{7}	5	[11]
3	(Croatia) D Marcan (Croatia) A Šančić	6	6
2	(France) F Martin (India) P Raja	4	3

Final
(Slovakia) A Martin (Slovakia) I Zelenay	6	5	[10]
3	(Croatia) D Marcan (Croatia) A Šančić	4	7	[8]
