= 2014 Internazionali di Tennis del Friuli Venezia Giulia – Singles =

Singles
- 2014 Internazionali di Tennis del Friuli Venezia Giulia

Final
- Champion: (Spain) Albert Montañés
- Runner-up: (Italy) Potito Starace
- Score: 6–2, 6–4

Events
Singles	Doubles
← 2013 ·	Internazionali di Tennis del Friuli Venezia Giulia	· 2015 →

Albert Montañés won the title, beating Potito Starace 6–2, 6–4

== Seeds ==
1. (Italy) Paolo Lorenzi (semifinals)
2. (Spain) Daniel Gimeno Traver (semifinals)
3. (Serbia) Filip Krajinović (withdrew)
4. (Italy) Filippo Volandri (quarterfinals)
5. (Spain) Albert Montañés (champion)
6. (Romania) Adrian Ungur (second round)
7. (Italy) Potito Starace (final)
8. (Brazil) Rogério Dutra Silva (first round)
9. (Italy) Andrea Arnaboldi (first round)

== Draw ==
=== Key ===
- Q = Qualifier
- WC = Wild card
- LL = Lucky loser
- Alt = Alternate
- SE = Special exempt
- PR = Protected ranking
- ITF = ITF entry
- JE = Junior exempt
- w/o = Walkover
- r = Retired
- d = Defaulted
- SR = Special ranking

=== Finals ===
Semifinals
1	(Italy) Paolo Lorenzi	7	5	4
7	(Italy) Potito Starace	5	7	6
5	(Spain) Albert Montañés	6^{4}	7	6
2	(Spain) Daniel Gimeno Traver	7^{7}	5	2

Final
7	(Italy) Potito Starace	2	4
5	(Spain) Albert Montañés	6	6

=== Top half ===
First round
1	(Italy) P Lorenzi	7	5	6
WC	(Italy) S Napolitano	5	7	1
(Spain) E López-Pérez	5	3
(Spain) D Muñoz de la Nava	7	6
(Sweden) E Ymer	6	1	6
(Slovenia) J Semrajc	2	6	4
(Spain) R Ramírez Hidalgo	6	4	6
8	(Brazil) R Dutra Silva	1	6	0
4	(Italy) F Volandri	7^{7}	6
(Estonia) J Zopp	6^{4}	3
(Italy) M Viola	3	6	6^{4}
SE	(Italy) A Giannessi	6	4	7^{7}
LL	(Italy) W Trusendi	4	7^{8}	7^{7}
(Brazil) G Clezar	6	6^{6}	6^{5}
(Venezuela) R Rodríguez	3	1
7	(Italy) P Starace	6	6

Second round
1	(Italy) P Lorenzi	6	7
(Spain) D Muñoz de la Nava	4	5
(Sweden) E Ymer	6	6
(Spain) R Ramírez Hidalgo	2	1
4	(Italy) F Volandri	6	6
SE	(Italy) A Giannessi	4	1
LL	(Italy) W Trusendi	1	1
7	(Italy) P Starace	6	6

Quarterfinals
1	(Italy) P Lorenzi	6	7
(Sweden) E Ymer	2	5
4	(Italy) F Volandri	4	2^{r}
7	(Italy) P Starace	6	4

Semifinals
1	(Italy) P Lorenzi	7	5	4
7	(Italy) P Starace	5	7	6

=== Bottom half ===
First round
5	(Spain) A Montañés	6	6
WC	(Italy) F Baldi	3	2
Q	(Croatia) V Galović	4	6	3
(Croatia) A Veić	6	3	6
WC	(Italy) F Cipolla	7	6
Q	(Monaco) B Balleret	5	2
Q	(Croatia) F Škugor	7^{8}	6
9	(Italy) A Arnaboldi	6^{6}	2
6	(Romania) A Ungur	6	6
Alt	(Slovakia) Adrian Sikora	4	3
(France) G Rufin	6	3	6
Q	(Italy) A Virgili	2	6	4
(Portugal) R Machado	7^{7}	6
(Spain) R Carballés Baena	6^{3}	4
WC	(Italy) Erik Crepaldi	4	7^{7}	2
2	(Spain) D Gimeno Traver	6	6^{5}	6

Second round
5	(Spain) A Montañés	6	6
(Croatia) A Veić	3	3
WC	(Italy) F Cipolla	0	4
Q	(Croatia) F Škugor	6	6
6	(Romania) A Ungur	3	4
(France) G Rufin	6	6
(Portugal) R Machado	0	1
2	(Spain) D Gimeno Traver	6	6

Quarterfinals
5	(Spain) A Montañés	7	6
Q	(Croatia) F Škugor	5	2
(France) G Rufin	1	6	5
2	(Spain) D Gimeno Traver	6	2	7

Semifinals
5	(Spain) A Montañés	6^{4}	7	6
2	(Spain) D Gimeno Traver	7^{7}	5	2
