= 2021 San Marino Open – Singles =

Singles
- 2021 San Marino Open

Final
- Champion: (Denmark) Holger Rune
- Runner-up: (Brazil) Orlando Luz
- Score: 1–6, 6–2, 6–3

Events
| Singles | Doubles |
| ← 2014 · | San Marino Open | · 2022 → |

Adrian Ungur was the defending champion when the event was last held in 2014 but chose not to defend his title as he had retired from professional tennis.

Holger Rune won the title after defeating Orlando Luz 1–6, 6–2, 6–3 in the final.

== Seeds ==
1. (Italy) Marco Cecchinato (semifinals)
2. (France) Gilles Simon (second round)
3. (Italy) Salvatore Caruso (second round)
4. (Bolivia) Hugo Dellien (semifinals)
5. (Italy) Federico Gaio (first round)
6. (Argentina) Tomás Martín Etcheverry (withdrew)
7. (Argentina) Sebastián Báez (first round)
8. (Slovenia) Blaž Rola (second round)

== Draw ==
=== Key ===
- Q = Qualifier
- WC = Wild card
- LL = Lucky loser
- Alt = Alternate
- SE = Special exempt
- PR = Protected ranking
- ITF = ITF entry
- JE = Junior exempt
- w/o = Walkover
- r = Retired
- d = Defaulted
- SR = Special ranking

=== Finals ===
Semifinals
1 | (Italy) Marco Cecchinato | 5 | 6^{4}
(Denmark) Holger Rune | 7 | 7^{7}
4 | (Bolivia) Hugo Dellien | 4 | 2
Q | (Brazil) Orlando Luz | 6 | 6

Final
(Denmark) Holger Rune | 1 | 6 | 6
Q | (Brazil) Orlando Luz | 6 | 2 | 3

=== Top half ===
First round
1 | (Italy) M Cecchinato | 7^{7} | 6
(Italy) P Lorenzi | 6^{3} | 2
WC | (Italy) R Brancaccio | 4 | 4
WC | (Italy) L Nardi | 6 | 6
(Italy) R Marcora | 7^{8} | 7^{7}
(Italy) A Pellegrino | 6^{6} | 6^{1}
LL | (Russia) P Kotov | 7^{7} | 7^{7}
5 | (Italy) F Gaio | 6^{2} | 6^{3}
3 | (Italy) S Caruso | 3 | 6 | 6
(France) Q Halys | 6 | 2 | 2
PR | (Belgium) J Cagnina | 3 | 4
(Denmark) H Rune | 6 | 6
(Brazil) J Menezes | 5 | 6 | 6
(Portugal) G Elias | 7 | 4 | 4
(Italy) GM Moroni | 6 | 3 | 5
Q | (Italy) F Forti | 4 | 6 | 7

Second round
1 | (Italy) M Cecchinato | 7^{7} | 7^{8}
WC | (Italy) L Nardi | 6^{4} | 6^{6}
(Italy) R Marcora | 4 | 4
LL | (Russia) P Kotov | 6 | 6
3 | (Italy) S Caruso | 6 | 6^{4} | 2
(Denmark) H Rune | 2 | 7^{7} | 6
(Brazil) J Menezes | 6^{2} | 7^{7} | 7^{11}
Q | (Italy) F Forti | 7^{7} | 6^{2} | 6^{9}

Quarterfinals
1 | (Italy) M Cecchinato | 7^{7} | 6
LL | (Russia) P Kotov | 6^{5} | 3
(Denmark) H Rune | 6 | 7
(Brazil) J Menezes | 0 | 5

Semifinals
1 | (Italy) M Cecchinato | 5 | 6^{4}
(Denmark) H Rune | 7 | 7^{7}

=== Bottom half ===
First round
7 | (Argentina) S Báez | 6^{4} | 7 | 5
(United Kingdom) J Clarke | 7^{7} | 5 | 7
(Croatia) B Gojo | 5 | 2
(Brazil) F Meligeni Alves | 7 | 6
(Argentina) R Olivo | 6^{4} | 4
(Romania) M Copil | 7^{7} | 6
Q | (Italy) Manuel Mazza | 4 | 5
4 | (Bolivia) H Dellien | 6 | 7
8 | (Slovenia) B Rola | 6 | 6
(Czech Republic) Z Kolář | 3 | 3
Alt | (Tunisia) M Jaziri | 3 | 2^{r}
Q | (Brazil) O Luz | 6 | 4
(France) M Janvier | 6 | 6
Q | (Italy) J Ocleppo | 2 | 3
WC | (San Marino) M De Rossi | 3 | 3
2 | (France) G Simon | 6 | 6

Second round
(United Kingdom) J Clarke
(Brazil) F Meligeni Alves | w/o
(Romania) M Copil | 6 | 5 | 4
4 | (Bolivia) H Dellien | 4 | 7 | 6
8 | (Slovenia) B Rola | 6 | 4 | 2
Q | (Brazil) O Luz | 4 | 6 | 6
(France) M Janvier | 7 | 6
2 | (France) G Simon | 5 | 1

Quarterfinals
(Brazil) F Meligeni Alves | 3 | 2
4 | (Bolivia) H Dellien | 6 | 6
Q | (Brazil) O Luz | 7^{9} | 7
(France) M Janvier | 6^{7} | 5

Semifinals
4 | (Bolivia) H Dellien | 4 | 2
Q | (Brazil) O Luz | 6 | 6
