= 2014 Morocco Tennis Tour – Mohammedia – Singles =

Mohammedia – Singles
- 2014 Morocco Tennis Tour – Mohammedia

Final
- Champion: (Spain) Pablo Carreño
- Runner-up: (Spain) Daniel Muñoz de la Nava
- Score: 7–6^{(7–2)}, 2–6, 6–2

Events
Singles	Doubles
Morocco Tennis Tour – Mohammedia	· 2015 →

This was the first edition of the tournament.

Pablo Carreño won the title, defeating Daniel Muñoz de la Nava in the final 7–6^{(7–2)}, 2–6, 6–2.

== Seeds ==
1. (Spain) Pablo Carreño (champion)
2. (Spain) Roberto Carballés Baena (first round)
3. (Brazil) Guilherme Clezar (second round)
4. (Spain) Rubén Ramírez Hidalgo (first round, retired)
5. (Egypt) Mohamed Safwat (second round)
6. (Chile) Gonzalo Lama (second round)
7. (Brazil) Ricardo Hocevar (first round)
8. (Australia) Jason Kubler (second round)

== Draw ==
=== Key ===
- Q = Qualifier
- WC = Wild card
- LL = Lucky loser
- Alt = Alternate
- SE = Special exempt
- PR = Protected ranking
- ITF = ITF entry
- JE = Junior exempt
- w/o = Walkover
- r = Retired
- d = Defaulted
- SR = Special ranking

=== Finals ===
Semifinals
1	(Spain) Pablo Carreño	4	6	6
(Belgium) Joris De Loore	6	3	3
(Spain) Daniel Muñoz de la Nava	7^{7}	6
Q	(Chile) Nicolás Jarry	6^{5}	1

Final
1	(Spain) Pablo Carreño	7^{7}	2	6
(Spain) Daniel Muñoz de la Nava	6^{2}	6	2

=== Top half ===
First round
1	(Spain) P Carreño	5
(Spain) R Ortega Olmedo	2^{r}
WC	(Morocco) Y Idmbarek	5	6	6
(France) M Vaïsse	7	3	4
Q	(Brazil) F de Paula	6	6
(Russia) A Lobkov	1	4
(France) TK Wang	5	6	5
5	(Egypt) M Safwat	7	3	7
4	(Spain) R Ramírez Hidalgo	6	2	1^{r}
(Belgium) J De Loore	3	6	4
(Egypt) K Hossam	6	4	3
(Netherlands) A van der Duim	2	6	6
Q	(Spain) Juan-Samuel Arauzo-Martínez	6	6
WC	(Morocco) Y Rachidi	2	1
(Belgium) Y Reuter	2	3
6	(Chile) G Lama	6	6

Second round
1	(Spain) P Carreño	6	6
WC	(Morocco) Y Idmbarek	0	0
Q	(Brazil) F de Paula	7	7^{7}
5	(Egypt) M Safwat	5	6^{5}
(Belgium) J De Loore	7^{7}	4
(Netherlands) A van der Duim	6^{5}	3^{r}
Q	(Spain) J-S Arauzo-Martínez	6	3	6
6	(Chile) G Lama	3	6	4

Quarterfinals
1	(Spain) P Carreño	6	6
Q	(Brazil) F de Paula	1	3
(Belgium) J De Loore	7	6
Q	(Spain) J-S Arauzo-Martinez	5	1

Semifinals
1	(Spain) P Carreño	4	6	6
(Belgium) J De Loore	6	3	3

=== Bottom half ===
First round
8	(Australia) J Kubler	6	6
(Venezuela) R Rodríguez	3	2
(Spain) D Muñoz de la Nava	6	6
(Belgium) A De Greef	1	1
WC	(Morocco) A Ahouda	2	2
(Serbia) P Krstin	6	6
(Slovakia) Adrian Sikora	6	2	4
3	(Brazil) G Clezar	4	6	6
7	(Brazil) R Hocevar	3	2
Q	(Egypt) S Sabry	6	6
WC	(Morocco) M Jdi	0	1
(France) Jules Marie	6	6
(Germany) R Becker	6	1	6
LL	(France) Élie Rousset	4	6	3
Q	(Chile) N Jarry	6	7^{9}
2	(Spain) RC Baena	1	6^{7}

Second round
8	(Australia) J Kubler	3	3
(Spain) D Muñoz de la Nava	6	6
(Serbia) P Krstin	6	6
3	(Brazil) G Clezar	3	4
Q	(Egypt) S Sabry	6	3	7^{7}
(France) J Marie	3	6	6^{4}
(Germany) R Becker	2	6	2
Q	(Chile) N Jarry	6	4	6

Quarterfinals
(Spain) D Muñoz de la Nava	6	6
(Serbia) P Krstin	3	0
Q	(Egypt) S Sabry	2	7	2
Q	(Chile) N Jarry	6	5	6

Semifinals
(Spain) D Muñoz de la Nava	7^{7}	6
Q	(Chile) N Jarry	6^{5}	1
