= 2014 San Marino GO&FUN Open – Singles =

Singles
- 2014 San Marino GO&FUN Open

Final
- Champion: (Romania) Adrian Ungur
- Runner-up: (Croatia) Antonio Veić
- Score: 6–1, 6–0

Events
Singles	Doubles
← 2013 ·	San Marino GO&FUN Open	· 2021 →

Adrian Ungur took the title, beating qualifier Antonio Veić 6–1, 6–0

== Seeds ==
1. (Italy) Simone Bolelli (quarterfinals)
2. (Spain) Daniel Gimeno Traver (second round)
3. (Argentina) Máximo González (first round)
4. (Spain) Albert Montañés (quarterfinals)
5. (Germany) Julian Reister (withdrew due to flu)
6. (Germany) Peter Gojowczyk (first round)
7. (Serbia) Filip Krajinović (quarterfinals)
8. (Italy) Filippo Volandri (second round)

== Draw ==
=== Key ===
- Q = Qualifier
- WC = Wild card
- LL = Lucky loser
- Alt = Alternate
- SE = Special exempt
- PR = Protected ranking
- ITF = ITF entry
- JE = Junior exempt
- w/o = Walkover
- r = Retired
- d = Defaulted
- SR = Special ranking

=== Finals ===
Semifinals
WC	(Italy) Alessandro Giannessi	3	3
(Romania) Adrian Ungur	6	6
(Brazil) Guilherme Clezar	3	6	2
Q	(Croatia) Antonio Veić	6	3	6

Final
(Romania) Adrian Ungur	6	6
Q	(Croatia) Antonio Veić	1	0

=== Top half ===
First round
1	(Italy) S Bolelli	7	7^{8}
(Georgia (country)) N Basilashvili	5	6^{6}
(Italy) S Travaglia	4	3
(Netherlands) J Huta Galung	6	6
WC	(Italy) A Giannessi	6	6
Q	(Brazil) Wilson Leite	1	1
SE	(Italy) R Marcora	7	7^{7}
6	(Germany) P Gojowczyk	5	6^{3}
4	(Spain) A Montañés	6	7^{7}
(Italy) P Starace	2	6^{3}
(Italy) F Cipolla	6	3	2
(Italy) M Cecchinato	4	6	6
(Romania) A Ungur	6	6
(Spain) E López-Pérez	3	1
(Italy) A Arnaboldi	0	6	4
8	(Italy) F Volandri	6	2	6

Second round
1	(Italy) S Bolelli	6	6
(Netherlands) J Huta Galung	4	4
WC	(Italy) A Giannessi	6	6
SE	(Italy) R Marcora	3	4
4	(Spain) A Montañés	7^{7}	2	6
(Italy) M Cecchinato	6^{3}	6	1
(Romania) A Ungur	6^{1}	6	6
8	(Italy) F Volandri	7^{7}	2	2

Quarterfinals
1	(Italy) S Bolelli	6	4	3
WC	(Italy) A Giannessi	4	6	6
4	(Spain) A Montañés	6	5	6^{5}
(Romania) A Ungur	1	7	7^{7}

Semifinals
WC	(Italy) A Giannessi	3	3
(Romania) A Ungur	6	6

=== Bottom half ===
First round
7/WC	(Serbia) F Krajinović	6	6
SE	(Italy) F Gaio	4	2
(Croatia) M Delić	7^{7}	6
Q	(Chile) C Garin	6^{2}	2
(Brazil) R Dutra Silva	2	6	6
Q	(Ecuador) G Lapentti	6	2	1
(Brazil) G Clezar	7^{7}	6
3/WC	(Argentina) M González	6^{3}	0
LL	(Venezuela) R Rodríguez	6^{5}	3
(Romania) V Hănescu	7^{7}	6
Q	(Croatia) A Veić	7^{8}	3	7^{7}
(Italy) L Vanni	6^{6}	6	6^{3}
(Moldova) R Albot	6	3	2
WC	(Serbia) V Troicki	4	6	6
(Bosnia and Herzegovina) A Šetkić	5	5
2	(Spain) D Gimeno Traver	7	7

Second round
7/WC	(Serbia) F Krajinović	7^{7}	6
(Croatia) M Delić	6^{4}	4
(Brazil) R Dutra Silva	4	3
(Brazil) G Clezar	6	6
(Romania) V Hănescu	6	6^{4}	4
Q	(Croatia) A Veić	1	7^{7}	6
WC	(Serbia) V Troicki	4	7^{7}	7^{8}
2	(Spain) D Gimeno Traver	6	6^{3}	6^{6}

Quarterfinals
7/WC	(Serbia) F Krajinović	3	6^{2}
(Brazil) G Clezar	6	7^{7}
Q	(Croatia) A Veić	6	6
WC	(Serbia) V Troicki	2	4

Semifinals
(Brazil) G Clezar	3	6	2
Q	(Croatia) A Veić	6	3	6
