= 2021 San Marino Open =

- Date: 9–15 August
- Edition: 28th
- Location: City of San Marino, San Marino

Champions

Singles
- (Denmark) Holger Rune

Doubles
- (Czech Republic) Zdeněk Kolář / (Venezuela) Luis David Martínez
← 2014 ·	San Marino Open	· 2022 →

The 2021 San Marino Open was a professional tennis tournament played on clay courts. The 28th edition of the tournament, which was part of the 2021 ATP Challenger Tour, took place in City of San Marino, San Marino between 9 and 15 August 2021.

== Singles main-draw entrants ==
=== Seeds ===
Country	Player	Rank^{1}	Seed
ITA	Marco Cecchinato	84	1
FRA	Gilles Simon	102	2
ITA	Salvatore Caruso	111	3
BOL	Hugo Dellien	139	4
ITA	Federico Gaio	147	5
~~ARG~~	~~Tomás Martín Etcheverry~~	~~148~~	~~6~~
ARG	Sebastián Báez	156	7
SLO	Blaž Rola	173	8

- ^{1} Rankings are as of 2 August 2021.

=== Other entrants ===
The following players received wildcards into the singles main draw:

- (Italy) Raúl Brancaccio
- (San Marino) Marco De Rossi
- (Italy) Luca Nardi

The following player received entry into the singles main draw using a protected ranking:

- (Belgium) Julien Cagnina

The following player received entry into the singles main draw as an alternate:

- (Tunisia) Malek Jaziri

The following players received entry from the qualifying draw:

- (Italy) Francesco Forti
- (Brazil) Orlando Luz
- (Italy) Manuel Mazza
- (Italy) Julian Ocleppo

The following player received entry as a lucky loser:

- (Russia) Pavel Kotov

== Champions ==
=== Singles ===
- (Denmark) Holger Rune def. (Brazil) Orlando Luz 1–6, 6–2, 6–3.

=== Doubles ===
- (Czech Republic) Zdeněk Kolář / (Venezuela) Luis David Martínez def. (Brazil) Rafael Matos / (Brazil) João Menezes 1–6, 6–3, [10–3].
