= 2014 San Marino GO&FUN Open – Doubles =

Doubles
- 2014 San Marino GO&FUN Open

Final
- Champions: (Moldova) Radu Albot (Spain) Enrique López-Pérez
- Runners-up: (Croatia) Franko Škugor (Romania) Adrian Ungur
- Score: 6–4, 6–1

Events
Singles	Doubles
← 2013 ·	San Marino GO&FUN Open	· 2021 →

Radu Albot and Enrique López-Pérez won the title, beating Franko Škugor and Adrian Ungur 6–4, 6–1

== Seeds ==
1. (Sweden) Johan Brunström / (United States) Nicholas Monroe (quarterfinals)
2. (Netherlands) Jesse Huta Galung / (New Zealand) Michael Venus (semifinals)
3. (Italy) Daniele Bracciali / (Italy) Potito Starace (first round, withdrew)
4. (Germany) Frank Moser / (Germany) Alexander Satschko (quarterfinals)

== Draw ==
Key

- Q = Qualifier
- WC = Wild card
- LL = Lucky loser
- Alt = Alternate
- ITF = ITF entry
- PR = Protected ranking
- SR = Special ranking
- SE = Special exempt
- JE = Junior exempt
- JR = Junior Accelerator Programme entrant
- CO = College Accelerator Programme entrant
- NG = Next Gen Accelerator Program entrant
- w/o = Walkover
- r = Retired
- d = Defaulted

=== Draw ===
First round
1	(Sweden) J Brunström (United States) N Monroe	6	6
(Uruguay) A Behar (Argentina) G Durán	4	4
(Italy) F Cipolla (Argentina) M González	4	6	[10]
(Italy) C Grassi (Netherlands) W Koolhof	6	3	[7]
3	(Italy) D Bracciali (Italy) P Starace
(Croatia) F Škugor (Romania) A Ungur	w.o
(Italy) M Cecchinato (Croatia) M Delić	6	6
WC	(United States) Sam Barnett (United States) J Witten	1	4
PR	(France) O Charroin (Italy) R Ghedin	5	6^{4}
(Moldova) R Albot (Spain) E López-Pérez	7	7^{7}
WC	(Italy) Federico Bertuccioli (San Marino) M De Rossi	2	4
4	(Germany) F Moser (Germany) A Satschko	6	6
(Italy) A Motti (Italy) L Vanni	3	6	[4]
(Brazil) G Clezar (Brazil) R Dutra Silva	6	1	[10]
WC	(Italy) Andrea Grossi (Italy) Francesco Mendo	1	4
2	(Netherlands) J Huta Galung (New Zealand) M Venus	6	6

Quarterfinals
1	(Sweden) J Brunström (United States) N Monroe	6	4	[8]
(Italy) F Cipolla (Argentina) M González	0	6	[10]
(Croatia) F Škugor (Romania) A Ungur	6	6
(Italy) M Cecchinato (Croatia) M Delić	4	4
(Moldova) R Albot (Spain) E López-Pérez	7	6
4	(Germany) F Moser (Germany) A Satschko	5	3
(Brazil) G Clezar (Brazil) R Dutra Silva	6	5	[8]
2	(Netherlands) J Huta Galung (New Zealand) M Venus	4	7	[10]

Semifinals
(Italy) F Cipolla (Argentina) M González	3	3
(Croatia) F Škugor (Romania) A Ungur	6	6
(Moldova) R Albot (Spain) E López-Pérez	6	6
2	(Netherlands) J Huta Galung (New Zealand) M Venus	4	4

Final
(Croatia) F Škugor (Romania) A Ungur	4	1
(Moldova) R Albot (Spain) E López-Pérez	6	6
