= 2015 Internazionali di Tennis del Friuli Venezia Giulia – Singles =

Singles
- 2015 Internazionali di Tennis del Friuli Venezia Giulia

Final
- Champion: (Serbia) Filip Krajinović
- Runner-up: (Romania) Adrian Ungur
- Score: 5–7, 6–4, 4–1 ret.

Events
Singles	Doubles
← 2014 ·	Internazionali di Tennis del Friuli Venezia Giulia	· 2016 →

Albert Montañés was the defending champion, but chose not to participate.

Filip Krajinović won the tournament, defeating Adrian Ungur in the final.

== Seeds ==
1. (Spain) Albert Ramos-Viñolas (quarterfinals)
2. (Italy) Paolo Lorenzi (semifinals)
3. (Serbia) Filip Krajinović (champion)
4. (France) Kenny de Schepper (quarterfinals)
5. (Slovakia) Andrej Martin (first round)
6. (Spain) Roberto Carballés Baena (semifinals)
7. (Italy) Filippo Volandri (quarterfinals)
8. (Italy) Gianluca Naso (second round)

== Draw ==
=== Key ===
- Q = Qualifier
- WC = Wild card
- LL = Lucky loser
- Alt = Alternate
- SE = Special exempt
- PR = Protected ranking
- ITF = ITF entry
- JE = Junior exempt
- w/o = Walkover
- r = Retired
- d = Defaulted
- SR = Special ranking

=== Finals ===
Semifinals
6	(Spain) Roberto Carballés Baena	6	4	2
(Romania) Adrian Ungur	4	6	6
3	(Serbia) Filip Krajinović	7^{7}	6
2	(Italy) Paolo Lorenzi	6^{5}	4

Final
(Romania) Adrian Ungur	7	4	1^{r}
3	(Serbia) Filip Krajinović	5	6	4

=== Top half ===
First round
1	(Spain) A Ramos-Viñolas	6	6
Q	(Spain) J Munar	3	0
(Austria) M Linzer	7^{7}	6
(Brazil) R Dutra Silva	6^{5}	4
SE	(Slovenia) G Žemlja	6^{5}	7	6
WC	(Italy) Omar Giacalone	7^{7}	5	2
(Argentina) P Cachin	6	1	6^{3}
6	(Spain) R Carballés Baena	2	6	7^{7}
4	(France) K de Schepper	7	6
Q	(Croatia) N Mektić	5	4
(Italy) A Giannessi	6	6
Alt	(Brazil) F Romboli	3	2
(Romania) A Ungur	7^{8}	6
WC	(Italy) L Sonego	6^{6}	4
Q	(Italy) Nicola Ghedin	3	6	4
8	(Italy) G Naso	6	2	6

Second round
1	(Spain) A Ramos-Viñolas	6	6
(Austria) M Linzer	2	2
SE	(Slovenia) G Žemlja	4	3
6	(Spain) R Carballés Baena	6	6
4	(France) K de Schepper	6	7^{7}
(Italy) A Giannessi	0	6^{2}
(Romania) A Ungur	1	6	6
8	(Italy) G Naso	6	2	4

Quarterfinals
1	(Spain) A Ramos-Viñolas	6	2	3
6	(Spain) R Carballés Baena	4	6	6
4	(France) K de Schepper	4	6^{7}
(Romania) A Ungur	6	7^{9}

Semifinals
6	(Spain) R Carballés Baena	6	4	2
(Romania) A Ungur	4	6	6

=== Bottom half ===
First round
5	(Slovakia) A Martin	2	3
Q	(Italy) M Trevisan	6	6
(Bosnia and Herzegovina) T Brkić	2	3
(Croatia) A Veić	6	6
WC	(Italy) A Virgili	2	6	3
(Italy) Erik Crepaldi	6	3	6
(Egypt) M Safwat	5	2
3	(Serbia) F Krajinović	7	6
7	(Italy) F Volandri	6	6
(Serbia) M Zekić	2	4
WC	(Italy) A Pellegrino	4	6	5
(Italy) M Viola	6	3	7
(Italy) F Gaio	2	2
(Italy) T Fabbiano	6	6
(Serbia) P Krstin	0	0
2	(Italy) P Lorenzi	6	6

Second round
Q	(Italy) M Trevisan	6^{4}	6	2
(Croatia) A Veić	7^{7}	4	6
(Italy) E Crepaldi	0	0
3	(Serbia) F Krajinović	6	6
7	(Italy) F Volandri	4	6	6
(Italy) M Viola	6	3	0
(Italy) T Fabbiano	6^{3}	6	1^{r}
2	(Italy) P Lorenzi	7^{7}	4	4

Quarterfinals
(Croatia) A Veić	6^{4}	3
3	(Serbia) F Krajinović	7^{7}	6
7	(Italy) F Volandri	6^{1}	3
2	(Italy) P Lorenzi	7^{7}	6

Semifinals
3	(Serbia) F Krajinović	7^{7}	6
2	(Italy) P Lorenzi	6^{5}	4
