= 2014 Internazionali di Tennis del Friuli Venezia Giulia – Doubles =

Doubles
- 2014 Internazionali di Tennis del Friuli Venezia Giulia

Final
- Champions: (Italy) Potito Starace (Romania) Adrian Ungur
- Runners-up: (Czech Republic) František Čermák (Czech Republic) Lukáš Dlouhý
- Score: 6–2, 6–4

Events
Singles	Doubles
← 2013 ·	Internazionali di Tennis del Friuli Venezia Giulia	· 2015 →

Potito Starace and Adrian Ungur won the title, beating František Čermák and Lukáš Dlouhý 6–2, 6–4

== Seeds ==
1. (Czech Republic) František Čermák / (Czech Republic) Lukáš Dlouhý (final)
2. (United Kingdom) Ken Skupski / (United Kingdom) Neal Skupski (quarterfinals)
3. (Germany) Frank Moser / (Germany) Alexander Satschko (semifinals)
4. (Chinese Taipei) Lee Hsin-han / (Italy) Alessandro Motti (semifinals)

== Draw ==
=== Key ===
- Q = Qualifier
- WC = Wild card
- LL = Lucky loser
- Alt = Alternate
- SE = Special exempt
- PR = Protected ranking
- ITF = ITF entry
- JE = Junior exempt
- w/o = Walkover
- r = Retired
- d = Defaulted
- SR = Special ranking

=== Draw ===
First round
1	(Czech Republic) F Čermák (Czech Republic) L Dlouhý	6	6
WC	(Italy) Simone Appio (Italy) Mauro Commisso	3	1
(Netherlands) S Fransen (Spain) E López-Pérez	6	4	[10]
(Monaco) B Balleret (Italy) M Bortolotti	3	6	[7]
3	(Germany) F Moser (Germany) A Satschko	w/o
(Croatia) F Škugor (Croatia) A Veić
(Italy) F Cipolla (Italy) A Giannessi	6	5	[10]
WC	(Italy) P Fanucci (Italy) W Trusendi	4	7	[4]
PR	(France) O Charroin (Italy) R Ghedin	6	1	[10]
WC	(Italy) F Baldi (Italy) S Napolitano	2	6	[6]
(Italy) C Grassi (Netherlands) W Koolhof	1	1
4	(Chinese Taipei) H-h Lee (Italy) A Motti	6	6
(Italy) P Starace (Romania) A Ungur	w/o
Alt	(Spain) D Muñoz de la Nava (Spain) R Ramírez Hidalgo
Alt	(Italy) E Becuzzi (Italy) P Lorenzi	2	2
2	(United Kingdom) K Skupski (United Kingdom) N Skupski	6	6

Quarterfinals
1	(Czech Republic) F Čermák (Czech Republic) L Dlouhý	6	6
(Netherlands) S Fransen (Spain) E López-Pérez	2	1
3	(Germany) F Moser (Germany) A Satschko	w/o
(Italy) F Cipolla (Italy) A Giannessi
PR	(France) O Charroin (Italy) R Ghedin	4	4
4	(Chinese Taipei) H-h Lee (Italy) A Motti	6	6
(Italy) P Starace (Romania) A Ungur	6	6
2	(United Kingdom) K Skupski (United Kingdom) N Skupski	3	1

Semifinals
1	(Czech Republic) F Čermák (Czech Republic) L Dlouhý	7^{7}	6
3	(Germany) F Moser (Germany) A Satschko	6^{5}	3
4	(Chinese Taipei) H-h Lee (Italy) A Motti	6^{6}	4
(Italy) P Starace (Romania) A Ungur	7^{8}	6

Final
1	(Czech Republic) F Čermák (Czech Republic) L Dlouhý	2	4
(Italy) P Starace (Romania) A Ungur	6	6
