= 2021 San Marino Open – Doubles =

Doubles
- 2021 San Marino Open

Final
- Champions: (Czech Republic) Zdeněk Kolář (Venezuela) Luis David Martínez
- Runners-up: (Brazil) Rafael Matos (Brazil) João Menezes
- Score: 1–6, 6–3, [10–3]

Events
Singles	Doubles
← 2014 ·	San Marino Open	· 2022 →

Radu Albot and Enrique López Pérez were the defending champions but chose not to defend their title.

Zdeněk Kolář and Luis David Martínez won the title after defeating Rafael Matos and João Menezes 1–6, 6–3, [10–3] in the final.

== Seeds ==
1. (United Kingdom) Lloyd Glasspool / (United Kingdom) Jonny O'Mara (first round)
2. (Finland) Harri Heliövaara / (Australia) Matt Reid (first round)
3. (Brazil) Orlando Luz / (Brazil) Felipe Meligeni Alves (quarterfinals)
4. (Czech Republic) Zdeněk Kolář / (Venezuela) Luis David Martínez (champions)

== Draw ==
=== Key ===
- Q = Qualifier
- WC = Wild card
- LL = Lucky loser
- Alt = Alternate
- SE = Special exempt
- PR = Protected ranking
- ITF = ITF entry
- JE = Junior exempt
- w/o = Walkover
- r = Retired
- d = Defaulted
- SR = Special ranking

First round
1	(United Kingdom) L Glasspool (United Kingdom) J O'Mara	3	6	[7]
Alt	(Brazil) Oscar José Gutierrez (Spain) N Sánchez Izquierdo	6	3	[10]
(United States) E King (United States) M Schnur	6	6
PR	(Russia) P Kotov (Italy) A Motti	3	2
3	(Brazil) O Luz (Brazil) F Meligeni Alves	6	6
WC	(Italy) Federico Bertuccioli (Italy) Andrea Picchione	3	3
WC	(San Marino) M De Rossi (Italy) Manuel Mazza	3	4
(Brazil) R Matos (Brazil) J Menezes	6	6
WC	(Italy) R Brancaccio (Italy) F Maestrelli	4	6	[5]
(Colombia) N Barrientos (Spain) S Martos Gornés	6	4	[10]
(Romania) VV Cornea (Spain) D Vega Hernández	5	4
4	(Czech Republic) Z Kolář (Venezuela) LD Martínez	7	6
(France) S Doumbia (France) F Reboul	7^{10}	6
(France) M Janvier (France) M Martineau	6^{8}	3
(Monaco) R Arneodo (Italy) J Ocleppo	6	6
2	(Finland) H Heliövaara (Australia) M Reid	1	2

Quarterfinals
Alt	(Brazil) OJ Gutierrez (Spain) N Sánchez Izquierdo	6^{5}	7^{9}	[9]
(United States) E King (United States) M Schnur	7^{7}	6^{7}	[11]
3	(Brazil) O Luz (Brazil) F Meligeni Alves	5	3
(Brazil) R Matos (Brazil) J Menezes	7	6
(Colombia) N Barrientos (Spain) S Martos Gornés	7^{9}	3	[7]
4	(Czech Republic) Z Kolář (Venezuela) LD Martínez	6^{7}	6	[10]
(France) S Doumbia (France) F Reboul	6	7^{7}
(Monaco) R Arneodo (Italy) J Ocleppo	4	6^{4}

Semifinals
(United States) E King (United States) M Schnur	5	1
(Brazil) R Matos (Brazil) J Menezes	7	6
4	(Czech Republic) Z Kolář (Venezuela) LD Martínez	7^{11}	6
(France) S Doumbia (France) F Reboul	6^{9}	4

Final
(Brazil) R Matos (Brazil) J Menezes	6	3	[3]
4	(Czech Republic) Z Kolář (Venezuela) LD Martínez	1	6	[10]
