= 2013 Credit Agricole Friuladria Tennis Cup =

- Date: 12–18 August
- Edition: 10th
- Location: Cordenons, Italy

Champions

Singles
- (Spain) Pablo Carreño Busta

Doubles
- (Croatia) Marin Draganja / (Croatia) Franko Škugor
← 2012 ·	Credit Agricole Friuladria Tennis Cup	· 2014 →

The 2013 Credit Agricole Friuladria Tennis Cup was a professional tennis tournament played on clay courts. It was the tenth edition of the tournament which was part of the 2013 ATP Challenger Tour. It took place in Cordenons, Italy between 12 and 18 August 2013.

== Singles main draw entrants ==
=== Seeds ===
Country	Player	Rank^{1}	Seed
ITA	Paolo Lorenzi	68	1
AUT	Andreas Haider-Maurer	87	2
ESP	Pablo Carreño Busta	91	3
ROU	Adrian Ungur	93	4
ITA	Filippo Volandri	102	5
CRO	Antonio Veić	184	6
SRB	Boris Pašanski	193	7
ESP	Guillermo Olaso	233	8

- ^{1} Rankings are as of August 5, 2013.

=== Other entrants ===
The following players received wildcards into the singles main draw:

- (Italy) Gianluigi Quinzi
- (Italy) Stefano Napolitano
- (Italy) Adelchi Virgili
- (Italy) Filippo Baldi

The following players received entry from the qualifying draw:

- (Italy) Salvatore Caruso
- (Italy) Erik Crepaldi
- (Croatia) Mate Delić
- (Slovenia) Janez Semrajc

== Champions ==
=== Singles ===
- (Spain) Pablo Carreño Busta def. (France) Grégoire Burquier 6–4, 6–4

=== Doubles ===
- (Croatia) Marin Draganja / (Croatia) Franko Škugor def. (Slovakia) Norbert Gombos / (Czech Republic) Roman Jebavý 6–4, 6–4
