= 2014 Internazionali di Tennis del Friuli Venezia Giulia =

- Date: 11–17 August
- Edition: 11th
- Location: Cordenons, Italy

Champions

Singles
- (Spain) Albert Montañés

Doubles
- (Italy) Potito Starace / (Romania) Adrian Ungur
| ← 2013 · | Internazionali di Tennis del Friuli Venezia Giulia | · 2015 → |

The 2014 Internazionali di Tennis del Friuli Venezia Giulia was a professional tennis tournament played on clay courts. It was the eleventh edition of the tournament which was part of the 2014 ATP Challenger Tour. It took place in Cordenons, Italy between 11 and 17 August 2014.

== Singles main-draw entrants ==
=== Seeds ===
| Country | Player | Rank^{1} | Seed |
|---|---|---|---|
| ITA | Paolo Lorenzi | 79 | 1 |
| ESP | Daniel Gimeno Traver | 99 | 2 |
| SRB | ~~Filip Krajinović~~ | ~~112~~ | ~~3~~ |
| ITA | Filippo Volandri | 135 | 4 |
| ESP | Albert Montañés | 141 | 5 |
| ROU | Adrian Ungur | 157 | 6 |
| ITA | Potito Starace | 162 | 7 |
| BRA | Rogério Dutra Silva | 167 | 8 |

- ^{1} Rankings are as of August 4, 2014.

=== Other entrants ===
The following players received wildcards into the singles main draw:

- (Italy) Filippo Baldi
- (Italy) Flavio Cipolla
- (Italy) Erik Crepaldi
- (Italy) Stefano Napolitano

The following player received a special exemption into the singles main draw:

- (Italy) Alessandro Giannessi

The following player entered into the singles main draw as an alternate:

- (Slovakia) Adrian Sikora

The following player entered into the singles main draw as a lucky loser:

- (Italy) Walter Trusendi

The following players received entry from the qualifying draw:

- (Monaco) Benjamin Balleret
- (Croatia) Viktor Galović
- (Croatia) Franko Škugor
- (Italy) Adelchi Virgili

== Champions ==
=== Singles ===
- (Spain) Albert Montañés def. (Italy) Potito Starace 6–2, 6–4

=== Doubles ===
- (Italy) Potito Starace / (Romania) Adrian Ungur def. (Czech Republic) František Čermák / (Czech Republic) Lukáš Dlouhý 6–2, 6–4
