= 2011 Città di Como Challenger – Singles =

Singles
- 2011 Città di Como Challenger

Final
- Champion: (Spain) Pablo Carreño Busta
- Runner-up: (Germany) Andreas Beck
- Score: 6–4, 7–6^{(7–4)}

Events
Singles	Doubles
← 2010 ·	Città di Como Challenger	· 2012 →

Robin Haase was the defending champion, but decided not to participate.
Pablo Carreño Busta won the title, defeating Andreas Beck 6–4, 7–6^{(7–4)} in the final.

== Seeds ==
1. (France) Stéphane Robert (quarterfinals)
2. (France) Benoît Paire (semifinals)
3. (France) Florent Serra (first round)
4. (Germany) Andreas Beck (final)
5. (Italy) Paolo Lorenzi (semifinals)
6. (Germany) Simon Greul (quarterfinals)
7. (Germany) Denis Gremelmayr (first round)
8. (Spain) Pablo Carreño Busta (champion)

== Draw ==
=== Key ===
- Q = Qualifier
- WC = Wild card
- LL = Lucky loser
- Alt = Alternate
- SE = Special exempt
- PR = Protected ranking
- ITF = ITF entry
- JE = Junior exempt
- w/o = Walkover
- r = Retired
- d = Defaulted
- SR = Special ranking

=== Finals ===
Semifinals
5	(Italy) Paolo Lorenzi	1	4
4	(Germany) Andreas Beck	6	6
8	(Spain) Pablo Carreño Busta	6	7^{7}
2	(France) Benoît Paire	4	6^{2}

Final
4	(Germany) Andreas Beck	4	6^{4}
8	(Spain) Pablo Carreño Busta	6	7^{7}

=== Top half ===
First round
1	(France) S Robert	6	6
LL	(Brazil) L Kirche	2	3
(Slovakia) P Červenák	6^{4}	6	1^{r}
(Italy) M Crugnola	7^{7}	4	4
WC	(Argentina) F Delbonis	6	6
(Italy) Andrea Arnaboldi	3	2
LL	(Belgium) N Desein	0	4
5	(Italy) P Lorenzi	6	6
4	(Germany) A Beck	7^{7}	6
Alt	(Argentina) M Alund	6^{3}	3
LL	(Italy) R Marcora	1	4
(Italy) S Vagnozzi	6	6
(Croatia) K Mesaroš	6	4	6
Q	(Portugal) P Sousa	1	6	1
(Italy) M Viola	2	7	6
7	(Germany) D Gremelmayr	6	5	2

Second round
1	(France) S Robert	6	6
(Italy) M Crugnola	2	3
WC	(Argentina) F Delbonis	4	7^{7}	3
5	(Italy) P Lorenzi	6	6^{5}	6
4	(Germany) A Beck	6	6
(Italy) S Vagnozzi	3	2
(Croatia) K Mesaroš	5	7^{7}	6
(Italy) M Viola	7	6^{3}	4

Quarterfinals
1	(France) S Robert	2	2
5	(Italy) P Lorenzi	6	6
4	(Germany) A Beck	6	6
(Croatia) K Mesaroš	0	3

Semifinals
5	(Italy) P Lorenzi	1	4
4	(Germany) A Beck	6	6

=== Bottom half ===
First round
8	(Spain) P Carreño Busta	1	6	6
WC	(Italy) M Trevisan	6	4	1
WC	(Italy) D Giorgini	7^{7}	6
(Argentina) F Argüello	6^{3}	3
Alt	(France) Axel Michon	2	2
SE	(Germany) P Gojowczyk	6	6
Q	(Serbia) B Pašanski	4	7	7^{7}
3	(France) F Serra	6	5	6^{1}
6	(Germany) S Greul	6	6
Alt	(Austria) P Oswald	2	2
Q	(Italy) Antonio Comporto	0	7^{8}	7
Q	(Germany) S Stadler	6	6^{6}	5
LL	(Monaco) B Balleret	0	3
Alt	(Spain) I Cervantes Huegun	6	6
LL	(Argentina) Guillermo Durán	1	2
2	(France) B Paire	6	6

Second round
8	(Spain) P Carreño Busta	6	6^{5}	7^{7}
WC	(Italy) D Giorgini	1	7^{7}	6^{5}
SE	(Germany) P Gojowczyk	4	4
Q	(Serbia) B Pašanski	6	6
6	(Germany) S Greul	6
Q	(Italy) Antonio Comporto	3	r
Alt	(Spain) I Cervantes Huegun	6	3	1^{r}
2	(France) B Paire	3	6	4

Quarterfinals
8	(Spain) P Carreño Busta	3	6	4
Q	(Serbia) B Pašanski	6	4	1^{r}
6	(Germany) S Greul	2	6^{1}
2	(France) B Paire	6	7^{7}

Semifinals
8	(Spain) P Carreño Busta	6	7^{7}
2	(France) B Paire	4	6^{2}
