= 2016 Morocco Tennis Tour – Mohammedia =

Professional tennis tournament

- Date: 3–8 October
- Edition: 3rd
- Draw: 32S / 16D
- Prize money: €42,500
- Surface: Clay
- Location: Mohammedia, Morocco

Champions

Singles
- (Austria) Gerald Melzer

Doubles
- (Croatia) Dino Marcan / (Croatia) Antonio Šančić
- Morocco Tennis Tour – Mohammedia

The 2016 Morocco Tennis Tour – Mohammedia was a professional tennis tournament played on clay courts. It was the third edition of the tournament which was part of the 2016 ATP Challenger Tour. It took place in Mohammedia, Morocco between 3 and 8 October 2016.

== Singles main-draw entrants ==
=== Seeds ===
Country	Player	Rank^{1}	Seed
BIH	Damir Džumhur	74	1
AUT	Gerald Melzer	86	2
ESP	Daniel Gimeno Traver	116	3
ESP	Roberto Carballés Baena	126	4
SVK	Andrej Martin	127	5
BEL	Arthur De Greef	137	6
NED	Thiemo de Bakker	143	7
ESP	Rubén Ramírez Hidalgo	146	8

- ^{1} Rankings are as of September 26, 2016.

=== Other entrants ===
The following players received wildcards into the singles main draw:

- (Morocco) Amine Ahouda
- (Greece) Stefanos Tsitsipas
- (Morocco) Mehdi Jdi
- (Morocco) Yassine Idmbarek

The following player received entry into the singles main draw as a special exempt:

- (Sweden) Mikael Ymer

The following players received entry from the qualifying draw:

- (France) Maxime Janvier
- (Serbia) Miljan Zekić
- (Spain) Oriol Roca Batalla
- (Germany) Oscar Otte

== Champions ==
=== Singles ===
- (Austria) Gerald Melzer def. (Greece) Stefanos Tsitsipas, 6–3, 3–6, 6–2.

=== Doubles ===
- (Croatia) Dino Marcan / (Croatia) Antonio Šančić def. (Czech Republic) Roman Jebavý / (Slovakia) Andrej Martin 7–6^{(7–4)}, 6–4.
