= 2014 Morocco Tennis Tour – Mohammedia =

- Date: 14–21 June
- Edition: 1st
- Draw: 32S / 16D
- Prize money: €42,500
- Surface: Clay
- Location: Mohammedia, Morocco

Champions

Singles
- (Spain) Pablo Carreño

Doubles
- (Brazil) Fabiano de Paula / (Egypt) Mohamed Safwat
- Morocco Tennis Tour – Mohammedia

The 2014 Morocco Tennis Tour – Mohammedia was a professional tennis tournament played on red clay courts. It was the first edition of the tournament, which was part of the 2014 ATP Challenger Tour. It took place in Mohammedia, Morocco, from 14 to 21 June 2014, with a total financial commitment of €42,500. The singles title was won by Pablo Carreño, while the doubles title went to Fabiano de Paula and Mohamed Safwat.

== Singles main-draw entrants ==
=== Seeds ===
Country	Player	Rank^{1}	Seed
ESP	Pablo Carreño	73	1
ESP	Roberto Carballés Baena	182	2
BRA	Guilherme Clezar	206	3
ESP	Rubén Ramírez Hidalgo	208	4
EGY	Mohamed Safwat	216	5
CHI	Gonzalo Lama	249	6
BRA	Ricardo Hocevar	261	7
AUS	Jason Kubler	278	8

- ^{1} Rankings are as of June 9, 2014.

=== Other entrants ===
The following players received wildcards into the singles main draw:

- (Morocco) Yassine Idmbarek
- (Morocco) Younès Rachidi
- (Morocco) Amine Ahouda
- (Morocco) Mehdi Jdi

The following players received entry from the qualifying draw:

- (Brazil) Fabiano de Paula
- (Spain) Juan-Samuel Arauzo-Martinez
- (Egypt) Sherif Sabry
- (Chile) Nicolás Jarry

== Doubles main-draw entrants ==
=== Seeds ===
Country	Player	Country	Player	Rank^{1}	Seed
ITA	Riccardo Ghedin	NED	Antal van der Duim	313	1
PHI	Ruben Gonzales	VEN	Roberto Maytín	352	2
CHI	Nicolás Jarry	ITA	Walter Trusendi	735	3
BRA	Guilherme Clezar	BRA	Ricardo Hocevar	857	4

- ^{1} Rankings as of June 9, 2014.

=== Other entrants ===
The following pairs received wildcards into the doubles main draw:

- (Morocco) Mohamed Adnaoui / (Morocco) Mamoun El Abbar
- (Morocco) Mehdi Jdi / (Morocco) Younès Rachidi
- (Morocco) Amine Ahouda / (Morocco) Yassine Idmbarek

== Champions ==
=== Singles ===
- (Spain) Pablo Carreño def. (Spain) Daniel Muñoz de la Nava, 7–6^{(7–2)}, 2–6, 6–2

=== Doubles ===
- (Brazil) Fabiano de Paula / (Egypt) Mohamed Safwat def. (Germany) Richard Becker / (France) Elie Rousset, 6–2, 3–6, [10–6]
