= 2015 Morocco Tennis Tour – Mohammedia =

- Date: 5–10 October
- Edition: 2nd
- Draw: 32S / 16D
- Prize money: €42,500
- Surface: Clay
- Location: Mohammedia, Morocco

Champions

Singles
- (Spain) Roberto Carballés Baena

Doubles
- (Spain) Íñigo Cervantes / (Netherlands) Mark Vervoort
- Morocco Tennis Tour – Mohammedia

The 2015 Morocco Tennis Tour – Mohammedia was a professional tennis tournament played on clay courts. It was the second edition of the tournament which was part of the 2015 ATP Challenger Tour. It took place in Mohammedia, Morocco between 5 and 10 October 2015.

== Singles main-draw entrants ==
=== Seeds ===
Country	Player	Rank^{1}	Seed
ESP	Pablo Carreño Busta	61	1
ARG	Federico Delbonis	67	2
BIH	Damir Džumhur	88	3
ITA	Marco Cecchinato	89	4
ESP	Íñigo Cervantes	103	5
ESP	Albert Montañés	117	6
ESP	Roberto Carballés Baena	139	7
NED	Thiemo de Bakker	146	8

- ^{1} Rankings are as of September 28, 2015.

=== Other entrants ===
The following players received wildcards into the singles main draw:

- (Morocco) Hicham Khaddari
- (Morocco) Taha Tifnouti
- (Spain) Jaume Munar
- (Morocco) Yassine Idmbarek

The following players received entry from the qualifying draw:

- (Poland) Kamil Majchrzak
- (Serbia) Laslo Đere
- (Greece) Stefanos Tsitsipas
- (Slovakia) Jozef Kovalík

The following player received entry as a lucky loser:

- (Italy) Claudio Fortuna

== Champions ==
=== Singles ===
- (Spain) Roberto Carballés Baena def. (Poland) Kamil Majchrzak, 7–6^{(7–4)}, 6–2

=== Doubles ===
- (Spain) Íñigo Cervantes / (Netherlands) Mark Vervoort def. (Spain) Roberto Carballés Baena / (Spain) Pablo Carreño Busta, 3–6, 7–6^{(7–2)}, [12–10]
