= Morocco Tennis Tour – Mohammedia =

Professional Tennis Tournament

Tournament information
- Event name: Morocco Tennis Tour – Mohammedia
- Location: Mohammedia, Morocco
- Venue: Royal Tennis Club à Mohammedia
- Category: ATP Challenger Tour; ITF Women's Circuit
- Surface: Clay
- Draw: 32S/28Q/16D
- Prize money: ATP €42,500; ITF W35
ATP Tour
- Category: ATP Challenger Tour
- Draw: 32S/28Q/16D
- Prize money: €42,500
WTA Tour
- Category: ITF Women's Circuit
- Draw: 32S/32Q/16D
- Prize money: $35,000

The Morocco Tennis Tour – Mohammedia is a professional tennis tournament played on outdoor red clay courts. The first edition was held in 2014. In 2011 to 2015 it was part of the ATP Challenger Tour. It is held annually at the Royal Tennis Club à Mohammedia in Mohammedia, Morocco. In 2024 is currently ITF Women's World Tennis Tour It is a $35k level tournament.

== Past finals ==
=== Women's singles ===
Year	Champion	Runner-up	Score
2026	Daria Egorova	(Slovakia) Nina Vargová	3–6, 6–4, 7–6^{(7–5)}
2025	(Morocco) Yasmine Kabbaj	(Germany) Carolina Kuhl	6–3, 6–3
2024	Kristina Dmitruk	(Turkey) Çağla Büyükakçay	6–3, 6–7^{(5–7)}, 6–3

=== Women's doubles ===
Year	Champions	Runners-up	Score
2026	Elina Nepliy (India) Vasanti Shinde	(Italy) Martina Colmegna (Italy) Federica Sacco	3–6, 6–4, [10–4]
2025	Anastasia Tikhonova (Sweden) Lisa Zaar	(Japan) Rinko Matsuda (Italy) Sofia Rocchetti	6–2, 6–2
2024	Ekaterina Kazionova (Republic of Ireland) Celine Simunyu	(Japan) Funa Kozaki (Japan) Ikumi Yamazaki	6–3, 6–3

=== Men's singles ===
Year	Champion	Runner-up	Score
2016	(Austria) Gerald Melzer	(Greece) Stefanos Tsitsipas	6–3, 3–6, 6–2
2015	(Spain) Roberto Carballés Baena	(Poland) Kamil Majchrzak	7–6^{(7–4)}, 6–2
2014	(Spain) Pablo Carreño Busta	(Spain) Daniel Muñoz de la Nava	7–6^{(7–2)}, 2–6, 6–2

=== Men's doubles ===
Year	Champions	Runners-up	Score
2016	(Croatia) Dino Marcan (Croatia) Antonio Šančić	(Czech Republic) Roman Jebavý (Slovakia) Andrej Martin	7–6^{(7–4)}, 6–4
2015	(Spain) Íñigo Cervantes (Netherlands) Mark Vervoort	(Spain) Roberto Carballés Baena (Spain) Pablo Carreño Busta	3–6, 7–6^{(7–2)}, [12–10]
2014	(Brazil) Fabiano de Paula (Egypt) Mohamed Safwat	(Germany) Richard Becker (France) Elie Rousset	6–2, 3–6, [10–6]
