= Adrian Ungur =

Romanian tennis player

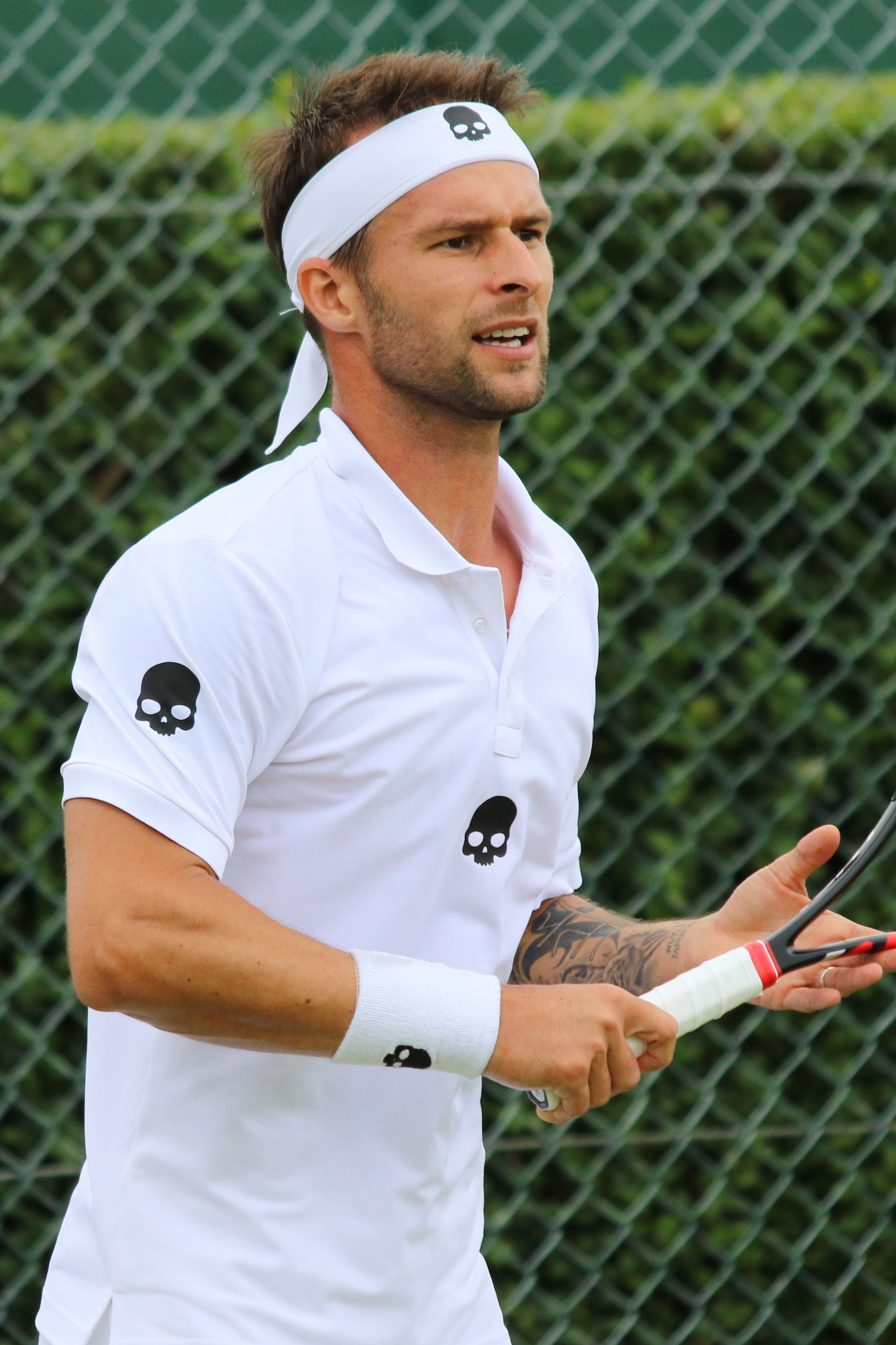
- Ungur at the 2016 Wimbledon Championships
- Country (sports): Romania
- Born: 22 January 1985 (age 41) Pitești, SR Romania
- Height: 1.78 m (5 ft 10 in)
- Turned pro: 2003
- Retired: 2018
- Plays: Right-handed (one-handed backhand)
- Prize money: $962,026

Singles
- Career record: 18–42
- Career titles: 0
- Highest ranking: No. 79 (11 June 2012)

Grand Slam singles results
- Australian Open: 1R (2013)
- French Open: 2R (2012)
- Wimbledon: 1R (2012, 2013)
- US Open: 1R (2012, 2013)

Other tournaments
- Olympic Games: 1R (2012)

Doubles
- Career record: 7–7
- Career titles: 1
- Highest ranking: No. 94 (20 July 2015)

Other doubles tournaments
- Olympic Games: 1R (2012)
- Last updated on: 17 February 2023.

Adrian Ungur (born 22 January 1985) is a Romanian former tennis player who mainly competed on the ATP Challenger Tour. In June 2012, Ungur reached his career-high ATP singles ranking of World No. 79. His most notable result was a four set victory over former World No. 3 David Nalbandian in the first round of the 2012 French Open. Ungur reached as high as No. 10 in the junior singles world rankings in January 2003. He was a member of the Romania Davis Cup Team.

== Career ==
=== 2012: Grand Slam debut and first top-10 win ===
Following some good results in Challenger events, Adrian entered into the main draw at the 2012 French Open, his first main draw appearance at Grand Slam level. He beat former world No. 3 David Nalbandian in the first round, before being defeated in four sets by Roger Federer in the second round – although he saved two match points in winning the third set.

=== 2015: Maiden and Home doubles title ===
In April at the Romanian Open partnering fellow Romanian Marius Copil, after saving five match points, they defeated Nicholas Monroe/Artem Sitak 17–15 in the match tiebreak to become the first Romanian team to win the Bucharest title since 1998 (Pavel/Trifu).

== Personal life ==
In 2006 Adrian married Liana, who is also a professional tennis player and daughter of Romanian football legend Ilie Balaci.

== ATP career finals ==
=== Doubles: 1 (1 title) ===
Winner – Legend Grand Slam tournaments (0–0) ATP World Tour Finals (0–0) ATP World Tour Masters 1000 (0–0) ATP World Tour 500 Series (0–0) ATP World Tour 250 Series (1–0)	Titles by surface Hard (0–0) Clay (1–0) Grass (0–0) Carpet (0–0)

Result	W–L	Date	Tournament	Tier	Surface	Partner	Opponents	Score
Win	1–0	Apr 2015	Bucharest, Romania	250 Series	Clay	(Romania) Marius Copil	(United States) Nicholas Monroe (New Zealand) Artem Sitak	3–6, 7–5, [17–15]

== ATP Challenger and ITF Futures finals ==
=== Singles: 36 (16–20) ===
Legend ATP Challenger (9–14) ITF Futures (7–6)	Finals by surface Hard (0–1) Clay (16–19) Grass (0–0) Carpet (0–0)

Result	W–L	Date	Tournament	Tier	Surface	Opponent	Score
Win	1–0	May 2004	Romania F1, Bucharest	Futures	Clay	(Romania) Adrian Cruciat	6–2, 6–4
Win	2–0	Jun 2004	Romania F7, Bucharest	Futures	Clay	(Croatia) Vjekoslav Skenderovic	6–3, 6–4
Loss	2–1	Jul 2004	Romania F11, Bucharest	Futures	Clay	(Romania) Adrian Cruciat	4–6, 4–6
Loss	2–2	Aug 2004	Romania F15, Bucharest	Futures	Clay	(Romania) Victor Ioniță	4–6, 3–6
Win	3–2	Mar 2005	Italy F2, Rome	Futures	Clay	(Austria) Marko Neunteibl	6–7^{(4–7)}, 6–3, 6–1
Win	4–2	Mar 2005	Italy F3, Siracuse	Futures	Clay	(Italy) Fabio Fognini	7–5, 1–6, 6–1
Loss	4–3	May 2005	Romania F4, Bucharest	Futures	Clay	(Romania) Gabriel Moraru	6–4, 3–6, 3–6
Win	5–3	Jun 2005	Romania F5, Bucharest	Futures	Clay	(Spain) Carles Poch Gradin	6–2, 7–5
Win	6–3	Jun 2005	Romania F7, Bucharest	Futures	Clay	(Romania) Victor Crivoi	6–3, 7–5
Loss	6–4	May 2006	Rome, Italy	Challenger	Clay	(Austria) Oliver Marach	6–4, 4–6, 5–7
Loss	6–5	Jul 2006	Constanța, Romania	Challenger	Clay	(Greece) Konstantinos Economidis	4–6, 4–6
Win	7–5	Aug 2007	Italy F28, Padua	Futures	Clay	(Italy) Francesco Piccari	7–6^{(7–2)}, 5–7, 6–4
Loss	7–6	Sep 2007	Todi, Italy	Challenger	Clay	(Italy) Stefano Galvani	5–7, 2–6
Win	8–6	Jun 2008	Sofia, Bulgaria	Challenger	Clay	(Brazil) Franco Ferreiro	6–3, 6–0
Loss	8–7	Jun 2008	Constanța, Romania	Challenger	Clay	(France) Nicolas Devilder	3–6, 7–6^{(7–5)}, 6–7^{(10–12)}
Loss	8–8	Jul 2009	Italy F18, Carpi	Futures	Clay	(Italy) Francesco Aldi	1–6, 6–7^{(1–7)}
Loss	8–9	Aug 2009	Italy F24, Padua	Futures	Clay	(Italy) Stefano Galvani	7–6^{(7–5)}, 2–6, 0–6
Loss	8–10	Sep 2009	Todi, Italy	Challenger	Clay	(Germany) Simon Greul	6–2, 1–6, 6–7^{(6–8)}
Win	9–10	Sep 2009	Palermo, Italy	Challenger	Clay	(Spain) Albert Ramos Viñolas	6–4, 6–4
Win	10–10	Jul 2011	San Benedetto, Italy	Challenger	Clay	(Italy) Stefano Galvani	7–5, 6–2
Win	11–10	Aug 2011	Manerbio, Italy	Challenger	Clay	(Germany) Peter Gojowczyk	4–6, 7–6^{(7–4)}, 6–2
Loss	11–11	Oct 2011	Palermo, Italy	Challenger	Clay	(Argentina) Carlos Berlocq	1–6, 1–6
Loss	11–12	Jan 2012	Bucamaranga, Colombia	Challenger	Clay	(United States) Wayne Odesnik	1–6, 6–7^{(4–7)}
Loss	11–13	Feb 2012	Meknes, Morocco	Challenger	Clay	(Russia) Evgeny Donskoy	1–6, 3–6
Loss	11–14	Mar 2012	Marrakech, Morocco	Challenger	Clay	(Slovakia) Martin Kližan	6–3, 3–6, 0–6
Win	12–14	Aug 2012	Sibiu, Romania	Challenger	Clay	(Romania) Victor Hănescu	6–4, 7–6^{(7–1)}
Loss	12–15	Sep 2012	Brașov, Romania	Challenger	Clay	(Austria) Andreas Haider-Maurer	6–3, 5–7, 2–6
Loss	12–16	Sep 2012	Trnava, Slovakia	Challenger	Clay	(Russia) Andrey Kuznetsov	3–6, 3–6
Loss	12–17	Dec 2012	São Paulo, Brazil	Challenger	Hard	(Argentina) Guido Pella	3–6, 7–6^{(7–4)}, 6–7^{(4–7)}
Win	13–17	May 2013	Tunis, Tunisia	Challenger	Clay	(Argentina) Diego Schwartzman	4–6, 6–0, 6–2
Win	14–17	Jun 2013	Arad, Romania	Challenger	Clay	(Romania) Marius Copil	6–4, 7–6^{(7–3)}
Loss	14–18	Sep 2013	Trnava, Slovakia	Challenger	Clay	(Germany) Julian Reister	6–7^{(3–7)}, 3–6
Win	15–18	Aug 2014	San Marino, San Marino	Challenger	Clay	(Croatia) Antonio Veić	6–1, 6–0
Loss	15–19	Aug 2015	Cordenons, Italy	Challenger	Clay	(Serbia) Filip Krajinović	7–5, 4–6, 1–4 ret.
Win	16–19	Sep 2015	Sibiu, Romania	Challenger	Clay	(Spain) Pere Riba	6–4, 3–6, 7–5
Loss	16–20	Aug 2017	Romania F8, Pitești	Futures	Clay	(Argentina) Hernán Casanova	6–7^{(1–7)}, 3–6

=== Doubles: 10 (6–4) ===
Legend ATP Challenger (6–4) ITF Futures (0–0)	Finals by surface Hard (0–0) Clay (6–4) Grass (0–0) Carpet (0–0)

Result	W–L	Date	Tournament	Tier	Surface	Partner	Opponents	Score
Win	1–0	Aug 2006	Manerbio, Italy	Challenger	Clay	(Romania) Gabriel Moraru	(Poland) Michał Przysiężny (Italy) Federico Torresi	6–3, 6–3
Win	2–0	Jul 2010	Rimini, Italy	Challenger	Clay	(Italy) Giulio Di Meo	(Argentina) Juan Pablo Brzezicki (Austria) Alexander Peya	7–6^{(8–6)}, 3–6, [10–7]
Loss	2–1	Mar 2011	Caltanissetta, Italy	Challenger	Clay	(Italy) Daniele Giorgini	(Italy) Daniele Bracciali (Italy) Simone Vagnozzi	6–3, 6–7^{(2–7)}, [7–10]
Loss	2–2	Aug 2014	San Marino, San Marino	Challenger	Clay	(Croatia) Franko Škugor	(Moldova) Radu Albot (Spain) Enrique López Pérez	4–6, 1–6
Win	3–2	Aug 2014	Cordenons, Italy	Challenger	Clay	(Italy) Potito Starace	(Czech Republic) František Čermák (Czech Republic) Lukáš Dlouhý	6–2, 6–4
Win	4–2	Sep 2014	Brașov, Romania	Challenger	Clay	(Italy) Daniele Giorgini	(Russia) Aslan Karatsev (Russia) Valery Rudnev	4–6, 7–6^{(7–4)}, [10–1]
Win	5–2	Sep 2014	Sibiu, Romania	Challenger	Clay	(Italy) Potito Starace	(Romania) Alexandru-Daniel Carpen (Romania) Marius Copil	7–5, 6–2
Win	6–2	Jan 2015	Casablanca, Morocco	Challenger	Clay	(Lithuania) Laurynas Grigelis	(Italy) Flavio Cipolla (Italy) Alessandro Motti	3–6, 6–2, [10–5]
Loss	6–3	Sep 2015	Alphen, Netherlands	Challenger	Clay	(Romania) Victor Hănescu	(Germany) Tobias Kamke (Germany) Jan-Lennard Struff	6–7^{(1–7)}, 6–3, [7–10]
Loss	6–4	Jul 2017	San Benedetto, Italy	Challenger	Clay	(Italy) Flavio Cipolla	(Spain) Pol Toledo Bagué (Spain) Carlos Taberner	5–7, 4–6

== Performance timeline ==
Key
W	F	SF	QF	#R	RR	Q#	P#	DNQ	A	Z#	PO	G	S	B	NMS	NTI	P	NH

(W) winner; (F) finalist; (SF) semifinalist; (QF) quarterfinalist; (#R) rounds 4, 3, 2, 1; (RR) round-robin stage; (Q#) qualification round; (P#) preliminary round; (DNQ) did not qualify; (A) absent; (Z#) Davis/Fed Cup Zonal Group (with number indication) or (PO) play-off; (G) gold, (S) silver or (B) bronze Olympic/Paralympic medal; (NMS) not a Masters tournament; (NTI) not a Tier I tournament; (P) postponed; (NH) not held; (SR) strike rate (events won / competed); (W–L) win–loss record.

=== Singles ===
Tournament	2006	2007	2008	2009	2010	2011	2012	2013	2014	2015	2016	SR	W–L	Win%
Grand Slam tournaments
Australian Open	Q1	Q1	Q1	A	A	Q1	A	1R	A	A	A	0 / 1	0–1	0%
French Open	A	Q2	Q2	Q1	Q1	Q2	2R	Q3	Q1	Q1	1R	0 / 2	1–2	33%
Wimbledon	A	A	A	Q1	A	Q1	1R	1R	A	Q1	Q1	0 / 2	0–2	0%
US Open	A	A	Q1	A	Q1	A	1R	1R	A	A	A	0 / 2	0–2	0%
Win–loss	0–0	0–0	0–0	0–0	0–0	0–0	1–3	0–3	0–0	0–0	0–1	0 / 7	1–7	13%
National Representation
Summer Olympics	NH		A	Not Held			1R	Not Held			A	0 / 1	0–1	0%
ATP Tour Masters 1000
Indian Wells	A	A	A	A	A	A	A	1R	A	A	A	0 / 0	0–0	–
Miami	A	A	A	A	A	A	A	Q1	A	A	A	0 / 0	0–0	–
Monte Carlo	A	A	A	A	A	A	Q2	A	A	A	Q1	0 / 0	0–0	–
Rome	A	A	A	A	A	A	1R	Q1	A	A	A	0 / 1	0–1	0%
Madrid	A	A	A	A	A	A	Q1	A	A	A	A	0 / 0	0–0	–
Win–loss	0–0	0–0	0–0	0–0	0–0	0–0	0–1	0–0	0–0	0–0	0–0	0 / 1	0–1	0%

== Davis Cup ==
=== Singles performances (5–3) ===
Edition	Round	Date	Against	Surface	Opponent	Win/Lose	Result
2010 Europe/Africa Zone Group I	QF	7–8 May 2010	Ukraine	Clay	Sergiy Stakhovsky	Lose	2–6, 7–6^{(7–3)}, 5–7, 5–7
2010 World Group play-offs	Play-off	17–19 September 2010	Ecuador	Clay	Giovanni Lapentti	Win	6–7^{(2–7)}, 4–6, 6–3, 6–4, 6–1
2010 World Group play-offs	Play-off	17–19 September 2010	Ecuador	Clay	Emilio Gómez	Win	6–3, 6–4
2011 World Group	1R	4–6 March 2011	Argentina	Clay	David Nalbandian	Lose	3–6, 2–6, 7–5, 4–6
2011 World Group	1R	4–6 March 2011	Argentina	Clay	Juan Mónaco	Win	6–4, 2–6, 6–3
2011 World Group play-offs	Play-off	16–18 September 2011	Czech Republic	Clay	Radek Štěpánek	Lose	3–6, 2–6, 0–6
2013 Europe/Africa Zone Group I	1R	1–3 February 2013	Denmark	Hard (indoor)	Martin Pedersen	Win	6–2, 7–6^{(7–3)}, 4–6, 4–6, 6–2
2013 Europe/Africa Zone Group I	1R	1–3 February 2013	Denmark	Hard (indoor)	Thomas Kromann	Win	6–3, 6–4
