= 2014 JSM Challenger of Champaign–Urbana =

- Date: 10 November – 16 November
- Edition: 19th
- Surface: Hard
- Location: Champaign, Illinois, United States

Champions

Singles
- (France) Adrian Mannarino

Doubles
- (United States) Ross William Guignon / (United States) Tim Kopinski
← 2013 ·	JSM Challenger of Champaign–Urbana	· 2015 →

The 2014 JSM Challenger of Champaign–Urbana was a professional tennis tournament played on hard courts. It was the nineteenth edition of the tournament which is part of the 2014 ATP Challenger Tour. It took place in Champaign, Illinois, United States between November 10 and November 16, 2014.

== Singles main-draw entrants ==
=== Seeds ===
Country	Player	Rank^{1}	Seed
FRA	Adrian Mannarino	61	1
TUN	Malek Jaziri	80	2
SLO	Blaž Rola	87	3
USA	Tim Smyczek	98	4
USA	Denis Kudla	125	5
AUS	James Duckworth	129	6
POR	Gastão Elias	131	7
CAN	Frank Dancevic	137	8

- ^{1} Rankings are as of November 3, 2014.

=== Other entrants ===
The following players received wildcards into the singles main draw:

- (United States) Marcos Giron
- (United Kingdom) Farris Fathi Gosea
- (United States) Jared Hiltzik
- (United States) Peter Kobelt

The following players received entry from the qualifying draw:

- (Czech Republic) Marek Michalička
- (Denmark) Frederik Nielsen
- (United States) Noah Rubin
- (South Africa) Fritz Wolmarans

The following player received entry by an alternate spot:

- (Bulgaria) Dimitar Kutrovsky

== Champions ==
=== Singles ===
- (France) Adrian Mannarino def. (Denmark) Frederik Nielsen, 6–2, 6–2

=== Doubles ===
- (United States) Ross William Guignon / (United States) Tim Kopinski def. (Canada) Frank Dancevic / (Canada) Adil Shamasdin, 7–6^{(7–2)}, 6–2
