= 2013 Napa Valley Challenger – Doubles =

Doubles
- 2013 Napa Valley Challenger

Final
- Champions: (United States) Bobby Reynolds (Australia) John-Patrick Smith
- Runners-up: (United States) Steve Johnson (United States) Tim Smyczek
- Score: 6–4, 7–6^{(7–2)}

Events
Singles	Doubles
Napa Valley Challenger	· 2014 →

This was the first edition of the event.

Bobby Reynolds and John-Patrick Smith won the title, defeating Steve Johnson and Tim Smyczek in the final, 6–4, 7–6^{(7–2)}.

== Seeds ==
1. (Australia) Chris Guccione / (Australia) Samuel Groth (first round)
2. (United States) Tennys Sandgren / (United States) Rhyne Williams (first round)
3. (United States) Bradley Klahn / (New Zealand) Michael Venus (first round)
4. (Ukraine) Denys Molchanov / (Australia) Matt Reid (first round)

== Draw ==
=== Key ===
- Q = Qualifier
- WC = Wild card
- LL = Lucky loser
- Alt = Alternate
- SE = Special exempt
- PR = Protected ranking
- ITF = ITF entry
- JE = Junior exempt
- w/o = Walkover
- r = Retired
- d = Defaulted
- SR = Special ranking

=== Draw ===
First round
1	(Australia) C Guccione (Australia) S Groth	3	4
(United States) S Johnson (United States) T Smyczek	6	6
(United Kingdom) D Cox (United Kingdom) J Milton	2	4
(United States) Erik Elliott (United States) M Seeberger	6	6
3	(United States) B Klahn (New Zealand) M Venus	5	3
(United Kingdom) E Corrie (United Kingdom) D Smethurst	7	6
(United States) D Kudla (United States) D Young	6	6
(India) Vijayant Malik (India) S Singh	2	2
(United States) B Reynolds (Australia) J-P Smith	6	3	[10]
(Italy) S Caruso (Bulgaria) D Kutrovsky	1	6	[5]
(United States) A Kuznetsov (Canada) P Polansky	4	6	[10]
4	(Ukraine) D Molchanov (Australia) M Reid	6	4	[5]
(El Salvador) M Arévalo (Colombia) N Barrientos	7^{7}	7
(United States) G Ouellette (United States) J Witten	6^{5}	5
(Australia) T Kokkinakis (Australia) B Mitchell	4	6	[10]
2	(United States) T Sandgren (United States) R Williams	6	2	[7]

Quarterfinals
(United States) S Johnson (United States) T Smyczek	6	6
(United States) E Elliott (United States) M Seeberger	4	0
(United Kingdom) E Corrie (United Kingdom) D Smethurst	2	2
(United States) D Kudla (United States) D Young	6	6
(United States) B Reynolds (Australia) J-P Smith	3	6	[10]
(United States) A Kuznetsov (Canada) P Polansky	6	2	[5]
(El Salvador) M Arévalo (Colombia) N Barrientos	3	1
(Australia) T Kokkinakis (Australia) B Mitchell	6	6

Semifinals
(United States) S Johnson (United States) T Smyczek	6	6
(United States) D Kudla (United States) D Young	2	4
(United States) B Reynolds (Australia) J-P Smith	6	6^{7}	[10]
(Australia) T Kokkinakis (Australia) B Mitchell	4	7^{9}	[7]

Final
(United States) S Johnson (United States) T Smyczek	4	6^{2}
(United States) B Reynolds (Australia) J-P Smith	6	7^{7}
