= 2014 JSM Challenger of Champaign–Urbana – Doubles =

Urbana – Doubles
- 2014 JSM Challenger of Champaign–Urbana

Final
- Champions: (United States) Ross William Guignon (United States) Tim Kopinski
- Runners-up: (Canada) Frank Dancevic (Canada) Adil Shamasdin
- Score: 7–6^{(7–2)}, 6–2

Events
| Singles | Doubles |
- JSM Challenger of Champaign–Urbana

Edward Corrie and Daniel Smethurst were the defending champions, however Smethurst chose not to participate. Corrie partnered Frederik Nielsen but lost in the first round.

Ross William Guignon and Tim Kopinski won the title, defeating Frank Dancevic and Adil Shamasdin in the final, 7–6^{(7–2)}, 6–2.

== Seeds ==
1. (United Kingdom) Edward Corrie / (Denmark) Frederik Nielsen (first round)
2. (Brazil) Marcelo Demoliner / (Venezuela) Roberto Maytín (quarterfinals)
3. (United States) Kevin King / (Colombia) Juan Carlos Spir (semifinals)
4. (Philippines) Ruben Gonzales / (India) Purav Raja (quarterfinals)

== Draw ==
Key

- Q = Qualifier
- WC = Wild card
- LL = Lucky loser
- Alt = Alternate
- ITF = ITF entry
- PR = Protected ranking
- SR = Special ranking
- SE = Special exempt
- JE = Junior exempt
- JR = Junior Accelerator Programme entrant
- CO = College Accelerator Programme entrant
- NG = Next Gen Accelerator Program entrant
- w/o = Walkover
- r = Retired
- d = Defaulted

=== Draw ===
First round
1 | (United Kingdom) E Corrie (Denmark) F Nielsen | 5 | 3
(El Salvador) M Arévalo (Mexico) MÁ Reyes-Varela | 7 | 6
(Canada) F Dancevic (Canada) A Shamasdin | 7 | 6
(Brazil) A Ghem (South Africa) D O'Brien | 5 | 4
3 | (United States) K King (Colombia) JC Spir | 7^{7} | 6
(United States) S Bangoura (United States) D Kudla | 6^{2} | 2
(United States) R Ram (United States) M Seeberger | 0 | 2
WC | (United States) C Ball (United States) T Sandgren | 6 | 6
WC | (United States) Aron Hiltzik (United States) Jared Hiltzik | 3 | 7^{7} | [8]
(Portugal) G Elias (United Kingdom) S Thornley | 6 | 6^{5} | [10]
Q | (United States) J Donaldson (United Kingdom) Farris Fathi Gosea | 4 | 2
4 | (Philippines) R Gonzales (India) P Raja | 6 | 6
(Czech Republic) M Michalička (Germany) P Torebko | 3 | 6 | [3]
WC | (United States) RW Guignon (United States) T Kopinski | 6 | 1 | [10]
(United Kingdom) L Burton (United Kingdom) M Willis | 7^{7} | 3 | [8]
2 | (Brazil) M Demoliner (Venezuela) R Maytín | 6^{2} | 6 | [10]

Quarterfinals
(El Salvador) M Arévalo (Mexico) MÁ Reyes-Varela | 6 | 4 | [3]
(Canada) F Dancevic (Canada) A Shamasdin | 3 | 6 | [10]
3 | (United States) K King (Colombia) JC Spir | 6 | 6
WC | (United States) C Ball (United States) T Sandgren | 2 | 3
(Portugal) G Elias (United Kingdom) S Thornley | 6 | 6
4 | (Philippines) R Gonzales (India) P Raja | 4 | 4
WC | (United States) RW Guignon (United States) T Kopinski | 6^{6} | 6 | [10]
2 | (Brazil) M Demoliner (Venezuela) R Maytín | 7^{8} | 4 | [5]

Semifinals
(Canada) F Dancevic (Canada) A Shamasdin | 6 | 6
3 | (United States) K King (Colombia) JC Spir | 4 | 4
(Portugal) G Elias (United Kingdom) S Thornley | 6^{4} | 4
WC | (United States) RW Guignon (United States) T Kopinski | 7^{7} | 6

Final
(Canada) F Dancevic (Canada) A Shamasdin | 6^{2} | 2
WC | (United States) RW Guignon (United States) T Kopinski | 7^{7} | 6
