= 2019 Firenze Tennis Cup =

- Date: 23–29 September
- Edition: 2nd
- Surface: Clay
- Location: Florence, Italy

Champions

Singles
- (Argentina) Marco Trungelliti

Doubles
- (Switzerland) Luca Margaroli / (Canada) Adil Shamasdin
← 2018 ·	Firenze Tennis Cup	· 2020 →

The 2019 Firenze Tennis Cup was a professional tennis tournament played on clay courts. It was the second edition of the tournament which was part of the 2019 ATP Challenger Tour. It took place in Florence, Italy between 23 and 29 September 2019.

== Singles main-draw entrants ==
=== Seeds ===
Country	Player	Rank^{1}	Seed
GER	Philipp Kohlschreiber	79	1
SVK	Martin Kližan	90	2
ESP	Jaume Munar	102	3
ITA	Salvatore Caruso	114	4
SVK	Andrej Martin	115	5
ITA	Paolo Lorenzi	120	6
POR	Pedro Sousa	122	7
SLO	Blaž Rola	133	8
ITA	Lorenzo Giustino	141	9
ESP	Pedro Martínez	149	10
SRB	Nikola Milojević	150	11
ITA	Federico Gaio	154	12
ITA	Filippo Baldi	155	13
NED	Robin Haase	156	14
BEL	Kimmer Coppejans	160	15
ITA	Alessandro Giannessi	171	16

- ^{1} Rankings are as of 16 September 2019.

=== Other entrants ===
The following players received wildcards into the singles main draw:

- (Spain) Carlos Alcaraz
- (Italy) Enrico Dalla Valle
- (Germany) Philipp Kohlschreiber
- (Italy) Lorenzo Musetti
- (Italy) Giulio Zeppieri

The following player received entry into the singles main draw using a protected ranking:

- (Spain) Íñigo Cervantes

The following players received entry from the qualifying draw:

- (France) Benjamin Bonzi
- (France) Jules Okala

The following player received entry as a lucky loser:

- (Italy) Riccardo Balzerani

== Champions ==
=== Singles ===
- (Argentina) Marco Trungelliti def. (Portugal) Pedro Sousa 6–2, 6–3.

=== Doubles ===
- (Switzerland) Luca Margaroli / (Canada) Adil Shamasdin def. (Spain) Gerard Granollers / (Spain) Pedro Martínez 7–5, 6–7^{(6–8)}, [14–12].
