= 2018 Firenze Tennis Cup – Singles =

Singles
- 2018 Firenze Tennis Cup

Final
- Champion: (Spain) Pablo Andújar
- Runner-up: (Argentina) Marco Trungelliti
- Score: 7–5, 6–3

Events
Singles	Doubles
Firenze Tennis Cup	· 2019 →

The 2018 Firenze Tennis Cup was the tournament's first editition. Pablo Andújar defeated Marco Trungelliti 7–5, 6–3 in the singles final.

== Seeds ==
1. (Italy) Lorenzo Sonego (semifinals)
2. (Spain) Roberto Carballés Baena (semifinals)
3. (Spain) Pablo Andújar (champion)
4. (Argentina) Marco Trungelliti (final)
5. (Italy) Stefano Travaglia (first round)
6. (Italy) Simone Bolelli (withdrew)
7. (Spain) Daniel Gimeno Traver (second round)
8. (Italy) Gianluigi Quinzi (second round)

== Draw ==
=== Key ===
- Q = Qualifier
- WC = Wild card
- LL = Lucky loser
- Alt = Alternate
- SE = Special exempt
- PR = Protected ranking
- ITF = ITF entry
- JE = Junior exempt
- w/o = Walkover
- r = Retired
- d = Defaulted
- SR = Special ranking

=== Finals ===
Semifinals
1	(Italy) Lorenzo Sonego	2	6	1
3	(Spain) Pablo Andújar	6	4	6
4	(Argentina) Marco Trungelliti	6	4	6
2	(Spain) Roberto Carballés Baena	0	6	3

Final
3	(Spain) Pablo Andújar	7	6
4	(Argentina) Marco Trungelliti	5	3

=== Top half ===
First round
1	(Italy) L Sonego	6	6
(France) J Tatlot	2	4
(Belgium) A De Greef	6	6
Q	(Netherlands) J Sels	2	2
(Spain) T Robredo	1	7	6
(Italy) S Caruso	6	5	3
(Italy) F Baldi	5	7	7
5	(Italy) S Travaglia	7	5	5
3	(Spain) P Andújar	6	6
LL	(Belgium) Z Bergs	0	2
Q	(Italy) G Mager	6^{4}	6	6
(Russia) A Vatutin	7^{7}	4	2
Q	(Germany) K Krawietz	6	3	6
(Lithuania) L Grigelis	4	6	3
(Italy) L Giustino	6	7^{7}
Q	(Italy) F Forti	2	6^{5}

Second round
1	(Italy) L Sonego	6	5	6
(Belgium) A De Greef	2	7	4
(Spain) T Robredo	3	2
(Italy) F Baldi	6	6
3	(Spain) P Andújar	6	6
Q	(Italy) G Mager	2	4
Q	(Germany) K Krawietz	2	4
(Italy) L Giustino	6	6

Quarterfinals
1	(Italy) L Sonego	6	6^{2}	6
(Italy) F Baldi	4	7^{7}	3
3	(Spain) P Andújar	6	6^{4}	6
(Italy) L Giustino	4	7^{7}	3

Semifinals
1	(Italy) L Sonego	2	6	1
3	(Spain) P Andújar	6	4	6

=== Bottom half ===
First round
7	(Spain) D Gimeno Traver	7^{7}	6
WC	(Italy) E Dalla Valle	6^{4}	4
(Spain) S Gutiérrez Ferrol	2	7^{7}	6
WC	(Italy) G Fonio	6	6^{5}	2
(Slovakia) F Horanský	6	6
(Italy) A Giannessi	2	0
WC	(Italy) J Ocleppo	6^{6}	4
4	(Argentina) M Trungelliti	7^{8}	6
8	(Italy) G Quinzi	6	6
(Slovakia) A Martin	2	2
LL	(Brazil) J Menezes	6^{2}	1
WC	(Italy) A Pellegrino	7^{7}	6
(Belgium) K Coppejans	6	7
(Germany) D Masur	2	5
(France) K de Schepper	3	6	5
2	(Spain) R Carballés Baena	6	4	7

Second round
7	(Spain) D Gimeno Traver	5	7^{8}	1
(Spain) S Gutiérrez Ferrol	7	6^{6}	6
(Slovakia) F Horanský	3	4
4	(Argentina) M Trungelliti	6	6
8	(Italy) G Quinzi	6^{3}	1
WC	(Italy) A Pellegrino	7^{7}	6
(Belgium) K Coppejans	1	4
2	(Spain) R Carballés Baena	6	6

Quarterfinals
(Spain) S Gutiérrez Ferrol	7^{7}	3	6^{5}
4	(Argentina) M Trungelliti	6^{3}	6	7^{7}
WC	(Italy) A Pellegrino	2	1
2	(Spain) R Carballés Baena	6	6

Semifinals
4	(Argentina) M Trungelliti	6	4	6
2	(Spain) R Carballés Baena	0	6	3
