= 2018 Firenze Tennis Cup – Doubles =

Doubles
- 2018 Firenze Tennis Cup

Final
- Champions: (Australia) Rameez Junaid (Netherlands) David Pel
- Runners-up: (Italy) Filippo Baldi (Italy) Salvatore Caruso
- Score: 7–5, 3–6, [10–7]

Events
Singles	Doubles
Firenze Tennis Cup	· 2019 →

This was the first edition of the tournament.

Rameez Junaid and David Pel won the title after defeating Filippo Baldi and Salvatore Caruso 7–5, 3–6, [10–7] in the final.

== Seeds ==
1. (Italy) Daniele Bracciali / (Italy) Andrea Vavassori (semifinals)
2. (Poland) Tomasz Bednarek / (Spain) David Vega Hernández (first round)
3. (Australia) Rameez Junaid / (Netherlands) David Pel (champions)
4. (Slovakia) Andrej Martin / (Chile) Hans Podlipnik Castillo (first round)

== Draw ==
=== Key ===
- Q = Qualifier
- WC = Wild card
- LL = Lucky loser
- Alt = Alternate
- SE = Special exempt
- PR = Protected ranking
- ITF = ITF entry
- JE = Junior exempt
- w/o = Walkover
- r = Retired
- d = Defaulted
- SR = Special ranking

First round
1	(Italy) D Bracciali (Italy) A Vavassori	6	7
(Serbia) N Čačić (Italy) L Giustino	2	5
(Belgium) K Coppejans (Argentina) M Trungelliti	6	3	[10]
(France) G Blancaneaux (Czech Republic) V Šafránek	3	6	[8]
3	(Australia) R Junaid (Netherlands) D Pel	6	6
WC	(Italy) A Basso (Italy) G Fonio	1	1
(Italy) A Motti (Italy) J Ocleppo	1	3
(Germany) K Krawietz (Germany) D Masur	6	6
(Croatia) T Draganja (Italy) A Giannessi	2	4
(Italy) F Baldi (Italy) S Caruso	6	6
(Poland) G Panfil (Ukraine) V Uzhylovskyi	6	6
4	(Slovakia) A Martin (Chile) H Podlipnik Castillo	4	3
WC	(Italy) M Bortolotti (Italy) A Virgili	2	3
WC	(Italy) E Dalla Valle (Italy) S Travaglia	6	6
(Spain) D Gimeno Traver (Spain) S Gutiérrez Ferrol	1	6	[10]
2	(Poland) T Bednarek (Spain) D Vega Hernández	6	3	[8]

Quarterfinals
1	(Italy) D Bracciali (Italy) A Vavassori	6	7^{9}
(Belgium) K Coppejans (Argentina) M Trungelliti	4	6^{7}
3	(Australia) R Junaid (Netherlands) D Pel	6	6
(Germany) K Krawietz (Germany) D Masur	3	4
(Italy) F Baldi (Italy) S Caruso	6	7
(Poland) G Panfil (Ukraine) V Uzhylovskyi	4	5
WC	(Italy) E Dalla Valle (Italy) S Travaglia	w/o
(Spain) D Gimeno Traver (Spain) S Gutiérrez Ferrol

Semifinals
1	(Italy) D Bracciali (Italy) A Vavassori	1	6^{10}
3	(Australia) R Junaid (Netherlands) D Pel	6	7^{12}
(Italy) F Baldi (Italy) S Caruso	6	6
WC	(Italy) E Dalla Valle (Italy) S Travaglia	2	4

Final
3	(Australia) R Junaid (Netherlands) D Pel	7	3	[10]
(Italy) F Baldi (Italy) S Caruso	5	6	[7]
