= 2014 Napa Valley Challenger – Singles =

Singles
- 2014 Napa Valley Challenger

Final
- Champion: (United States) Sam Querrey
- Runner-up: (United States) Tim Smyczek
- Score: 6–3, 6–1

Events
Singles	Doubles
← 2013 ·	Napa Valley Challenger	· 2015 →

The 2014 Napa Valley Challenger, also known as the ATP Challenger Napa, was a tennis tournament held in Napa, California. It was first held in 2013, and was played on outdoor hard courts.

In 2014, Donald Young was the defending champion, but chose not to compete.

Sam Querrey won the title by defeating Tim Smyczek 6–3, 6–1 in the final.

== Seeds ==
1. (United States) Sam Querrey (champion)
2. (United States) Tim Smyczek (final)
3. (Cyprus) Marcos Baghdatis (second round, retired)
4. (United States) Bradley Klahn (first round)
5. (Canada) Peter Polansky (first round)
6. (United States) Michael Russell (quarterfinals, retired)
7. (United States) Denis Kudla (first round)
8. (Canada) Frank Dancevic (first round)

== Draw ==
=== Key ===
- Q = Qualifier
- WC = Wild card
- LL = Lucky loser
- Alt = Alternate
- SE = Special exempt
- PR = Protected ranking
- ITF = ITF entry
- JE = Junior exempt
- w/o = Walkover
- r = Retired
- d = Defaulted
- SR = Special ranking

=== Finals ===
Semifinals
1/WC	(United States) Sam Querrey	6	6
(Australia) Alex Bolt	2	3
(United States) Jared Donaldson	6	4	3
2	(United States) Tim Smyczek	3	6	6

Final
1/WC	(United States) Sam Querrey	6	6
2	(United States) Tim Smyczek	3	1

=== Top half ===
First round
1/WC	(United States) S Querrey	7^{7}	6
Q	(Denmark) F Nielsen	6^{5}	3
(Republic of Ireland) J McGee	5	3
(Sweden) E Ymer	7	6
(United States) R Williams	7^{8}	1	7
(Australia) J Thompson	6^{6}	6	5
PR	(United States) T Sandgren	6	4	2
6	(United States) M Russell	4	6	6
3	(Cyprus) M Baghdatis	6	6
WC	(United States) M Giron	3	2
(Australia) M Reid	1	2
PR	(Australia) J Millman	6	6
WC	(United States) D Novikov	6	6
WC	(United States) M Seeberger	2	2
(Australia) A Bolt	6	6
5	(Canada) P Polansky	3	2

Second round
1/WC	(United States) S Querrey	6^{6}	7^{7}	6
(Sweden) E Ymer	7^{8}	6^{5}	3
(United States) R Williams	6	0	1
6	(United States) M Russell	4	6	6
3	(Cyprus) M Baghdatis	2	0^{r}
PR	(Australia) J Millman	6	3
WC	(United States) D Novikov	6	2	4
(Australia) A Bolt	4	6	6

Quarterfinals
1/WC	(United States) S Querrey	3
6	(United States) M Russell	0^{r}
PR	(Australia) J Millman	3	6^{3}
(Australia) A Bolt	6	7^{7}

Semifinals
1/WC	(United States) S Querrey	6	6
(Australia) A Bolt	2	3

=== Bottom half ===
First round
8	(Canada) F Dancevic	3	7^{8}	3
Q	(United States) D Nguyen	6	6^{6}	6
(Australia) J-P Smith	3	6	4
Q	(Germany) J Lenz	6	2	6
(United States) R Harrison	3	5
(United States) J Donaldson	6	7
(United States) W Odesnik	6	6
4	(United States) B Klahn	4	4
7	(United States) D Kudla	2	6	5
(United States) A Kuznetsov	6	3	7
(United Kingdom) L Broady	6	6
(United States) R Ginepri	4	0
(United States) B Fratangelo	3	7^{8}	6
(United Kingdom) K Edmund	6	6^{6}	2
Q	(Germany) N Langer	3	1
2	(United States) T Smyczek	6	6

Second round
Q	(United States) D Nguyen	6^{4}	2
Q	(Germany) J Lenz	7^{7}	6
(United States) J Donaldson	6	3
(United States) W Odesnik	2	1^{r}
(United States) A Kuznetsov	6^{6}	4
(United Kingdom) L Broady	7^{8}	6
(United States) B Fratangelo	6	3	1
2	(United States) T Smyczek	4	6	6

Quarterfinals
Q	(Germany) J Lenz	6^{4}	3
(United States) J Donaldson	7^{7}	6
(United Kingdom) L Broady	1	1
2	(United States) T Smyczek	6	6

Semifinals
(United States) J Donaldson	6	4	3
2	(United States) T Smyczek	3	6	6
