= 2014 JSM Challenger of Champaign–Urbana – Singles =

Urbana – Singles
- 2014 JSM Challenger of Champaign–Urbana

Final
- Champion: (France) Adrian Mannarino
- Runner-up: (Denmark) Frederik Nielsen
- Score: 6–2, 6–2

Events
| Singles | Doubles |
| ← 2013 · | JSM Challenger of Champaign–Urbana | · 2015 → |

Tennys Sandgren was the defending champion, however he lost in the first round to James Duckworth.

Adrian Mannarino won the title, defeating Frederik Nielsen in the final, 6–2, 6–2.

== Seeds ==
1. (France) Adrian Mannarino (champion)
2. (Tunisia) Malek Jaziri (semifinals)
3. (Slovenia) Blaž Rola (semifinals)
4. (United States) Tim Smyczek (first round)
5. (United States) Denis Kudla (quarterfinals)
6. (Australia) James Duckworth (second round)
7. (Portugal) Gastão Elias (second round)
8. (Canada) Frank Dancevic (quarterfinals)

== Draw ==
=== Key ===
- Q = Qualifier
- WC = Wild card
- LL = Lucky loser
- Alt = Alternate
- SE = Special exempt
- PR = Protected ranking
- ITF = ITF entry
- JE = Junior exempt
- w/o = Walkover
- r = Retired
- d = Defaulted
- SR = Special ranking

=== Finals ===
Semifinals
1 | (France) Adrian Mannarino | 6 | 6
3 | (Slovenia) Blaž Rola | 4 | 4
Q | (Denmark) Frederik Nielsen | 6 | 6
2 | (Tunisia) Malek Jaziri | 1 | 2

Final
1 | (France) Adrian Mannarino | 6 | 6
Q | (Denmark) Frederik Nielsen | 2 | 2

=== Top half ===
First round
1 | (France) A Mannarino | 4 | 6 | 7
Alt | (Bulgaria) D Kutrovsky | 6 | 1 | 5
(Republic of Ireland) J McGee | 6^{1} | 2
(United States) R Ram | 7^{7} | 6
WC | (United Kingdom) Farris Gosea | 6^{4} | 6 | 6^{2}
WC | (United States) M Giron | 7^{7} | 2 | 7^{7}
(Zimbabwe) T Garanganga | 4 | 4
7 | (Portugal) G Elias | 6 | 6
3 | (Slovenia) B Rola | 6 | 6
(France) L Lokoli | 0 | 2
Q | (South Africa) F Wolmarans | 2 | 4
(Brazil) A Ghem | 6 | 6
Q | (United States) N Rubin | 6 | 3 | 6
(United Kingdom) E Corrie | 1 | 6 | 2
(United States) K King | 3 | 5
8 | (Canada) F Dancevic | 6 | 7

Second round
1 | (France) A Mannarino | 4 | 6 | 6
(United States) R Ram | 6 | 1 | 4
WC | (United States) M Giron | 6 | 4 | 6
7 | (Portugal) G Elias | 3 | 6 | 4
3 | (Slovenia) B Rola | 6 | 7
(Brazil) A Ghem | 4 | 5
Q | (United States) N Rubin | 2 | 3
8 | (Canada) F Dancevic | 6 | 6

Quarterfinals
1 | (France) A Mannarino | 6 | 6
WC | (United States) M Giron | 2 | 3
3 | (Slovenia) B Rola | 7^{7} | 7
8 | (Canada) F Dancevic | 6^{5} | 5

Semifinals
1 | (France) A Mannarino | 6 | 6
3 | (Slovenia) B Rola | 4 | 4

=== Bottom half ===
First round
5 | (United States) D Kudla | 6 | 6^{5} | 6
(Sweden) C Lindell | 2 | 7^{7} | 1
(Brazil) Henrique Cunha | 1 | 3^{r}
WC | (United States) Jared Hiltzik | 6 | 4
(El Salvador) M Arévalo | 4 | 6 | 4
(Germany) P Torebko | 6 | 4 | 6
Q | (Denmark) F Nielsen | 6 | 1 | 6
4 | (United States) T Smyczek | 2 | 6 | 2
6 | (Australia) J Duckworth | 3 | 6 | 6
(United States) T Sandgren | 6 | 4 | 4
WC | (United States) P Kobelt | 4 | 3
Q | (Czech Republic) M Michalička | 6 | 6
(United States) J Donaldson | 6 | 6
(United States) A Kuznetsov | 4 | 4
(United Kingdom) L Broady | 4 | 6 | 6^{6}
2 | (Tunisia) M Jaziri | 6 | 4 | 7^{7}

Second round
5 | (United States) D Kudla | 7 | 6
WC | (United States) J Hiltzik | 5 | 3
(Germany) P Torebko | 3 | 6 | 3
Q | (Denmark) F Nielsen | 6 | 3 | 6
6 | (Australia) J Duckworth | 7^{7} | 4 | 2
Q | (Czech Republic) M Michalička | 6^{5} | 6 | 6
(United States) J Donaldson | 6 | 3 | 4
2 | (Tunisia) M Jaziri | 3 | 6 | 6

Quarterfinals
5 | (United States) D Kudla | 6 | 6^{6} | 2
Q | (Denmark) F Nielsen | 2 | 7^{8} | 6
Q | (Czech Republic) M Michalička | 6 | 3 | 4
2 | (Tunisia) M Jaziri | 4 | 6 | 6

Semifinals
Q | (Denmark) F Nielsen | 6 | 6
2 | (Tunisia) M Jaziri | 1 | 2
