= 2014 Napa Valley Challenger =

- Date: 22–28 September
- Edition: 2nd
- Surface: Hard
- Location: Napa, California, United States

Champions

Singles
- (United States) Sam Querrey

Doubles
- (Canada) Peter Polansky / (Canada) Adil Shamasdin
| ← 2013 · | Napa Valley Challenger | · 2015 → |

The 2014 Napa Valley Challenger was a professional tennis tournament played on hard courts. It was the second edition of the tournament which was part of the 2014 ATP Challenger Tour. It took place in Napa, California, United States, between 22 and 28 September 2014.

== Singles main-draw entrants ==
=== Seeds ===
| Country | Player | Rank^{1} | Seed |
|---|---|---|---|
| USA | Sam Querrey | 52 | 1 |
| USA | Tim Smyczek | 102 | 2 |
| CYP | Marcos Baghdatis | 107 | 3 |
| USA | Bradley Klahn | 118 | 4 |
| CAN | Peter Polansky | 122 | 5 |
| USA | Michael Russell | 124 | 6 |
| USA | Denis Kudla | 125 | 7 |
| CAN | Frank Dancevic | 147 | 8 |

- ^{1} Rankings are as of September 15, 2014.

=== Other entrants ===
The following players received wildcards into the singles main draw:

- (United States) Sam Querrey
- (United States) Marcos Giron
- (United States) Dennis Novikov
- (United States) Matt Seeberger

The following players received entry from the qualifying draw:

- (Germany) Nils Langer
- (Germany) Julian Lenz
- (United States) Daniel Nguyen
- (Denmark) Frederik Nielsen

== Champions ==
=== Singles ===
- (United States) Sam Querrey def. (United States) Tim Smyczek, 6–3, 6–1

=== Doubles ===
- (Canada) Peter Polansky / (Canada) Adil Shamasdin def. (United States) Bradley Klahn / (United States) Tim Smyczek, 7–6^{(7–0)}, 6–1
