= 2019 Firenze Tennis Cup – Singles =

Singles
- 2019 Firenze Tennis Cup

Final
- Champion: (Argentina) Marco Trungelliti
- Runner-up: (Portugal) Pedro Sousa
- Score: 6–2, 6–3

Events
Singles	Doubles
← 2018 ·	Firenze Tennis Cup	· 2020 →

Pablo Andújar was the defending champion but chose not to defend his title.

Marco Trungelliti won the title after defeating Pedro Sousa 6–2, 6–3 in the final.

== Seeds ==
All seeds receive a bye into the second round.

1. (Germany) Philipp Kohlschreiber (semifinals)
2. (Slovakia) Martin Kližan (second round, retired)
3. (Spain) Jaume Munar (third round)
4. (Italy) Salvatore Caruso (second round)
5. (Slovakia) Andrej Martin (second round, retired)
6. (Italy) Paolo Lorenzi (third round)
7. (Portugal) Pedro Sousa (final)
8. (Slovenia) Blaž Rola (third round)
9. (Italy) Lorenzo Giustino (second round)
10. (Spain) Pedro Martínez (second round)
11. (Serbia) Nikola Milojević (second round)
12. (Italy) Federico Gaio (third round)
13. (Italy) Filippo Baldi (second round, retired)
14. (Netherlands) Robin Haase (quarterfinals)
15. (Belgium) Kimmer Coppejans (quarterfinals)
16. (Italy) Alessandro Giannessi (third round)

== Draw ==
=== Key ===
- Q = Qualifier
- WC = Wild card
- LL = Lucky loser
- Alt = Alternate
- ITF = ITF entry
- PR = Protected ranking
- SR = Special ranking
- SE = Special exempt
- JE = Junior exempt
- JR = Junior Accelerator Programme entrant
- CO = College Accelerator Programme entrant
- NG = Next Gen Accelerator Program entrant
- w/o = Walkover
- r = Retired
- d = Defaulted

=== Finals ===
Quarterfinals
1/WC	(Germany) Philipp Kohlschreiber	6	6
(Italy) Raúl Brancaccio	4	1
15	(Belgium) Kimmer Coppejans	2	6^{3}
7	(Portugal) Pedro Sousa	6	7^{7}
(Egypt) Mohamed Safwat	4	6	6
14	(Netherlands) Robin Haase	6	1	2
(Argentina) Marco Trungelliti	4	6	7^{13}
(Spain) Mario Vilella Martínez	6	3	6^{11}

Semifinals
1/WC	(Germany) Philipp Kohlschreiber	3	5
7	(Portugal) Pedro Sousa	6	7
(Egypt) Mohamed Safwat	6	3	0
(Argentina) Marco Trungelliti	3	6	6

Final
7	(Portugal) Pedro Sousa	2	3
(Argentina) Marco Trungelliti	6	6

=== Top half ===
==== Section 1 ====
First round
(Italy) G Quinzi	6	2
(Kazakhstan) D Popko	3	0^{r}
Q	(France) Jules Okala	6	6
(Switzerland) S Ehrat	3	4
(Slovakia) A Molčan	6^{7}	6	2
(Italy) R Brancaccio	7^{9}	2	6
(Italy) GM Moroni	6^{4}	6^{3}
(Spain) C Taberner	7^{7}	7^{7}

Second round
1/WC	(Germany) P Kohlschreiber	6	6
(Italy) G Quinzi	2	2
Q	(France) J Okala	3	0
16	(Italy) A Giannessi	6	6
10	(Spain) P Martínez	7^{9}	3	2
(Italy) R Brancaccio	6^{7}	6	6
(Spain) C Taberner	6	3
5	(Slovakia) A Martin	4	1^{r}

Third round
1/WC	(Germany) P Kohlschreiber	4	6	6
16	(Italy) A Giannessi	6	4	3
(Italy) R Brancaccio	3	7^{7}	6
(Spain) C Taberner	6	6^{5}	4

Quarterfinals
1/WC	(Germany) P Kohlschreiber	6	6
(Italy) R Brancaccio	4	1

==== Section 2 ====
First round
(Italy) S Napolitano	1	6	6
WC	(Spain) C Alcaraz	6	4	1
(Italy) A Pellegrino	7^{9}	6
(Sweden) M Eriksson	6^{7}	3
(Italy) R Bonadio	6	5	3
PR	(Spain) Í Cervantes	2	7	6
(Slovenia) B Kavčič	1	3
WC	(Italy) E Dalla Valle	6	6

Second round
4	(Italy) S Caruso	3	6	4
(Italy) S Napolitano	6	3	6
(Italy) A Pellegrino	4	1
15	(Belgium) K Coppejans	6	6
12	(Italy) F Gaio	7^{7}	6
PR	(Spain) Í Cervantes	6^{5}	2
WC	(Italy) E Dalla Valle	5	6	4
7	(Portugal) P Sousa	7	4	6

Third round
(Italy) S Napolitano	6	2	3
15	(Belgium) K Coppejans	4	6	6
12	(Italy) F Gaio	2	6	2
7	(Portugal) P Sousa	6	4	6

Quarterfinals
15	(Belgium) K Coppejans	2	6^{3}
7	(Portugal) P Sousa	6	7^{7}

=== Bottom half ===
==== Section 3 ====
First round
(Spain) O Roca Batalla	6	6
(Croatia) N Serdarušić	3	2
(Argentina) P Cachin	1	1
(Egypt) M Safwat	6	6
LL	(Italy) Riccardo Balzerani	4	3
(Spain) J Barranco Cosano	6	6
WC	(Italy) L Musetti	6	7^{11}
Q	(France) B Bonzi	4	6^{9}

Second round
8	(Slovenia) B Rola	6^{4}	6	7
(Spain) O Roca Batalla	7^{7}	4	5
(Egypt) M Safwat	6	2	6
9	(Italy) L Giustino	3	6	3
14	(Netherlands) R Haase	6	6
(Spain) J Barranco Cosano	3	4
WC	(Italy) L Musetti	1	3
3	(Spain) J Munar	6	6

Third round
8	(Slovenia) B Rola	4	7	4
(Egypt) M Safwat	6	5	6
14	(Netherlands) R Haase	1	6	7
3	(Spain) J Munar	6	1	5

Quarterfinals
(Egypt) M Safwat	4	6	6
14	(Netherlands) R Haase	6	1	2

==== Section 4 ====
First round
WC	(Italy) G Zeppieri	4	4
(France) E Benchetrit	6	6
(Netherlands) J Sels	3	1
(Argentina) M Trungelliti	6	6
(Slovakia) F Horanský	6	2
(Italy) A Arnaboldi	1	0^{r}
(Spain) D Gimeno Traver	6^{1}	2
(Spain) M Vilella Martínez	7^{7}	6

Second round
6	(Italy) P Lorenzi	6^{5}	6	6
(France) E Benchetrit	7^{7}	1	2
(Argentina) M Trungelliti	6	6
11	(Serbia) N Milojević	4	2
13	(Italy) F Baldi	6^{1}	0^{r}
(Slovakia) F Horanský	7^{7}	0
(Spain) M Vilella Martínez	6^{3}	6	0
2	(Slovakia) M Kližan	7^{7}	3	1^{r}

Third round
6	(Italy) P Lorenzi	4	7^{7}	5
(Argentina) M Trungelliti	6	6^{1}	7
(Slovakia) F Horanský	1	1
(Spain) M Vilella Martínez	6	6

Quarterfinals
(Argentina) M Trungelliti	4	6	7^{13}
(Spain) M Vilella Martínez	6	3	6^{11}
