= 2013 Napa Valley Challenger – Singles =

Singles
- 2013 Napa Valley Challenger

Final
- Champion: (United States) Donald Young
- Runner-up: (Australia) Matthew Ebden
- Score: 4–6, 6–4, 6–2

Events
Singles	Doubles
Napa Valley Challenger	· 2014 →

This was the first edition of the event.

Donald Young won the title, defeating Matthew Ebden in the final, 4–6, 6–4, 6–2.

== Seeds ==
1. (United States) Denis Kudla (quarterfinals)
2. (United States) Tim Smyczek (semifinals)
3. (United States) Rhyne Williams (quarterfinals)
4. (United States) Alex Kuznetsov (semifinals)
5. (United States) Bradley Klahn (quarterfinals)
6. (Australia) Matthew Ebden (final)
7. (United States) Steve Johnson (first round)
8. (United States) Donald Young (champion)

== Draw ==
=== Key ===
- Q = Qualifier
- WC = Wild card
- LL = Lucky loser
- Alt = Alternate
- SE = Special exempt
- PR = Protected ranking
- ITF = ITF entry
- JE = Junior exempt
- w/o = Walkover
- r = Retired
- d = Defaulted
- SR = Special ranking

=== Finals ===
Semifinals
6	(Australia) Matthew Ebden	6	6
4	(United States) Alex Kuznetsov	2	0
8	(United States) Donald Young	6	6
2/WC	(United States) Tim Smyczek	3	2

Final
6	(Australia) Matthew Ebden	6	4	2
8	(United States) Donald Young	4	6	6

=== Top half ===
First round
1	(United States) D Kudla	6	6
(United Kingdom) E Corrie	0	2
(Canada) P Polansky	6	6
(Italy) S Caruso	1	3
(United States) T Sandgren	7^{7}	6
(El Salvador) M Arévalo	6^{2}	1
Q	(Bulgaria) D Kutrovsky	1	2
6	(Australia) M Ebden	6	6
4	(United States) A Kuznetsov	6	6
WC	(New Zealand) B McLachlan	1	4
(Australia) M Reid	6	0
(Ukraine) D Molchanov	1	0^{r}
(United States) R Ginepri	6	6
(Colombia) N Barrientos	1	1
(New Zealand) M Venus	7^{7}	6
7	(United States) S Johnson	6^{4}	4

Second round
1	(United States) D Kudla	6	6
(Canada) P Polansky	1	2
(United States) T Sandgren	6^{5}	3
6	(Australia) M Ebden	7^{7}	6
4	(United States) A Kuznetsov	6	6
(Australia) M Reid	4	4
(United States) R Ginepri	6	3	6^{6}
(New Zealand) M Venus	4	6	7^{8}

Quarterfinals
1	(United States) D Kudla	3	5
6	(Australia) M Ebden	6	7
4	(United States) A Kuznetsov	6	7^{7}
(New Zealand) M Venus	2	6^{3}

Semifinals
6	(Australia) M Ebden	6	6
4	(United States) A Kuznetsov	2	0

=== Bottom half ===
First round
8	(United States) D Young	6	6
Q	(United States) G Ouellette	3	2
WC	(United States) D Novikov	7^{8}	2	2
(Australia) S Groth	6^{6}	6	6
(United States) B Reynolds	6	6
(India) S Singh	2	4
WC	(United States) C Altamirano	2	2
3	(United States) R Williams	6	6
5	(United States) B Klahn	6	3	7
(United Kingdom) D Evans	3	6	5
Q	(Australia) T Kokkinakis	6	4	7^{7}
Q	(United States) J Witten	3	6	6^{4}
(United Kingdom) D Cox	7^{7}	6
(Australia) B Mitchell	6^{2}	1
(India) Vijayant Malik	2	2
2/WC	(United States) T Smyczek	6	6

Second round
8	(United States) D Young	6	6
(Australia) S Groth	3	1
(United States) B Reynolds	4	3
3	(United States) R Williams	6	6
5	(United States) B Klahn	3	6	6
Q	(Australia) T Kokkinakis	6	3	3
(United Kingdom) D Cox	1	1
2/WC	(United States) T Smyczek	6	6

Quarterfinals
8	(United States) D Young	6	7
3	(United States) R Williams	2	5
5	(United States) B Klahn	6	1	2
2/WC	(United States) T Smyczek	1	6	6

Semifinals
8	(United States) D Young	6	6
2/WC	(United States) T Smyczek	3	2
