= 2014 Napa Valley Challenger – Doubles =

Doubles
- 2014 Napa Valley Challenger

Final
- Champions: (Canada) Peter Polansky (Canada) Adil Shamasdin
- Runners-up: (United States) Bradley Klahn (United States) Tim Smyczek
- Score: 7–6^{(7–0)}, 6–1

Events
Singles	Doubles
- Napa Valley Challenger

Bobby Reynolds and John-Patrick Smith were the defending champions, but Reynolds chose not to participate. Smith partnered with Adam Hubble and lost in the quarterfinals to Alex Kuznetsov and Nils Langer.

Peter Polansky and Adil Shamasdin won the title, defeating Bradley Klahn and Tim Smyczek 7–6^{(7–0)}, 6–1 in the final.

== Seeds ==
1. (Canada) Peter Polansky / (Canada) Adil Shamasdin (champions)
2. (United States) Bradley Klahn / (United States) Tim Smyczek (final)
3. (United States) Sekou Bangoura / (United States) Vahid Mirzadeh (quarterfinals)
4. (United States) Tennys Sandgren / (United States) Rhyne Williams (first round)

== Draw ==
Key

- Q = Qualifier
- WC = Wild card
- LL = Lucky loser
- Alt = Alternate
- ITF = ITF entry
- PR = Protected ranking
- SR = Special ranking
- SE = Special exempt
- JE = Junior exempt
- JR = Junior Accelerator Programme entrant
- CO = College Accelerator Programme entrant
- NG = Next Gen Accelerator Program entrant
- w/o = Walkover
- r = Retired
- d = Defaulted

=== Draw ===
First round
1	(Canada) P Polansky (Canada) A Shamasdin	6	6
WC	(United States) B Fratangelo (United States) M Giron	2	3
(United States) D Kudla (United States) M Russell	4	7^{7}	[10]
(Netherlands) W Koolhof (Sweden) E Ymer	6	6^{3}	[7]
4	(United States) T Sandgren (United States) R Williams	2	3
PR	(Australia) A Hubble (Australia) J-P Smith	6	6
(Republic of Ireland) J Cluskey (Republic of Ireland) J McGee	6^{4}	3
(United States) A Kuznetsov (Germany) N Langer	7^{7}	6
(Australia) A Bolt (Canada) F Dancevic	6	3	[11]
WC	(United States) N Meister (United States) C Thompson	4	6	[9]
Q	(Austria) S Bader (United States) Erik Elliott	3	6	[3]
3	(United States) S Bangoura (United States) V Mirzadeh	6	1	[10]
WC	(Chile) J Peralta (United States) M Seeberger	6^{5}	7^{8}	[7]
(United Kingdom) L Broady (Australia) J Thompson	7^{7}	6^{6}	[10]
(Australia) M Reid (New Zealand) J Statham	4	3
2	(United States) B Klahn (United States) T Smyczek	6	6

Quarterfinals
1	(Canada) P Polansky (Canada) A Shamasdin	6	3	[10]
(United States) D Kudla (United States) M Russell	4	6	[7]
PR	(Australia) A Hubble (Australia) J-P Smith	3	4
(United States) A Kuznetsov (Germany) N Langer	6	6
(Australia) A Bolt (Canada) F Dancevic	7^{7}	1	[10]
3	(United States) S Bangoura (United States) V Mirzadeh	6^{4}	6	[7]
(United Kingdom) L Broady (Australia) J Thompson	2	6^{4}
2	(United States) B Klahn (United States) T Smyczek	6	7^{7}

Semifinals
1	(Canada) P Polansky (Canada) A Shamasdin	3	6	[10]
(United States) A Kuznetsov (Germany) N Langer	6	3	[5]
(Australia) A Bolt (Canada) F Dancevic	4	3
2	(United States) B Klahn (United States) T Smyczek	6	6

Final
1	(Canada) P Polansky (Canada) A Shamasdin	7^{7}	6
2	(United States) B Klahn (United States) T Smyczek	6^{0}	1
