= 2019 Firenze Tennis Cup – Doubles =

Doubles
- 2019 Firenze Tennis Cup

Final
- Champions: (Switzerland) Luca Margaroli (Canada) Adil Shamasdin
- Runners-up: (Spain) Gerard Granollers (Spain) Pedro Martínez
- Score: 7–5, 6–7^{(6–8)}, [14–12]

Events
Singles	Doubles
← 2018 ·	Firenze Tennis Cup	· 2020 →

Rameez Junaid and David Pel were the defending champions but chose not to defend their title.

Luca Margaroli and Adil Shamasdin won the title after defeating Gerard Granollers and Pedro Martínez 7–5, 6–7^{(6–8)}, [14–12] in the final.

== Seeds ==
1. (Italy) Simone Bolelli / (Spain) David Vega Hernández (quarterfinals)
2. (Bosnia and Herzegovina) Tomislav Brkić / (Croatia) Ante Pavić (semifinals)
3. (Switzerland) Luca Margaroli / (Canada) Adil Shamasdin (champions)
4. (Spain) Gerard Granollers / (Spain) Pedro Martínez (final)

== Draw ==
=== Key ===
- Q = Qualifier
- WC = Wild card
- LL = Lucky loser
- Alt = Alternate
- SE = Special exempt
- PR = Protected ranking
- ITF = ITF entry
- JE = Junior exempt
- w/o = Walkover
- r = Retired
- d = Defaulted
- SR = Special ranking

First round
1	(Italy) S Bolelli (Spain) D Vega Hernández	6	7^{8}
(Croatia) T Draganja (Egypt) M Safwat	1	6^{6}
4	(Spain) G Granollers (Spain) P Martínez	3	6	[10]
(Spain) J Barranco Cosano (Spain) D Gimeno Traver	6	4	[8]
PR	(Spain) Í Cervantes (Spain) O Roca Batalla	2	6^{4}
3	(Switzerland) L Margaroli (Canada) A Shamasdin	6	7^{7}
WC	(Italy) Riccardo Balzerani (Italy) G Zeppieri	1	6^{4}
WC	(Italy) E Dalla Valle (Italy) GM Moroni	6	7^{7}
WC	(Italy) Filippo Borella (Italy) Pietro Padovani	1	0
2	(Bosnia and Herzegovina) T Brkić (Croatia) A Pavić	6	6

Quarterfinals
1	(Italy) S Bolelli (Spain) D Vega Hernández	5	7	[9]
(Switzerland) S Ehrat (Sweden) M Eriksson	7	5	[11]
4	(Spain) G Granollers (Spain) P Martínez	6	7^{7}
(Belgium) K Coppejans (Spain) S Martos Gornés	0	6^{5}
(Portugal) P Sousa (Netherlands) M Vervoort	1	2
3	(Switzerland) L Margaroli (Canada) A Shamasdin	6	6
WC	(Italy) E Dalla Valle (Italy) GM Moroni	5	7^{7}	[9]
2	(Bosnia and Herzegovina) T Brkić (Croatia) A Pavić	7	6^{2}	[11]

Semifinals
(Switzerland) S Ehrat (Sweden) M Eriksson	7^{7}	2	[5]
4	(Spain) G Granollers (Spain) P Martínez	6^{5}	6	[10]
3	(Switzerland) L Margaroli (Canada) A Shamasdin	6	6
2	(Bosnia and Herzegovina) T Brkić (Croatia) A Pavić	4	3

Final
4	(Spain) G Granollers (Spain) P Martínez	5	7^{8}	[12]
3	(Switzerland) L Margaroli (Canada) A Shamasdin	7	6^{6}	[14]
