= 2015 JSM Challenger of Champaign–Urbana – Doubles =

Urbana – Doubles
- 2015 JSM Challenger of Champaign–Urbana

Final
- Champions: (Republic of Ireland) David O'Hare (United Kingdom) Joe Salisbury
- Runners-up: (United States) Austin Krajicek (United States) Nicholas Monroe
- Score: 6–1, 6–4

Events
Singles	Doubles
- JSM Challenger of Champaign–Urbana

David O'Hare and Joe Salisbury won the title, defeating Austin Krajicek and Nicholas Monroe in the final 6–1, 6–4 .

== Seeds ==
1. (United States) Austin Krajicek / (United States) Nicholas Monroe (final)
2. (Sweden) Johan Brunström / (Denmark) Frederik Nielsen (semifinals)
3. (South Africa) Dean O'Brien / (South Africa) Ruan Roelofse (quarterfinals)
4. (Mexico) Hans Hach Verdugo / (Mexico) Miguel Ángel Reyes-Varela (first round)

== Draw ==
Key

- Q = Qualifier
- WC = Wild card
- LL = Lucky loser
- Alt = Alternate
- ITF = ITF entry
- PR = Protected ranking
- SR = Special ranking
- SE = Special exempt
- JE = Junior exempt
- JR = Junior Accelerator Programme entrant
- CO = College Accelerator Programme entrant
- NG = Next Gen Accelerator Program entrant
- w/o = Walkover
- r = Retired
- d = Defaulted

=== Draw ===
First round
1	(United States) A Krajicek (United States) N Monroe	7^{7}	6
(United States) D Novikov (United States) E Quigley	6^{3}	2
Q	(United Kingdom) D Smethurst (United Kingdom) D Walsh	6	6
WC	(United States) Julian Allen Childers (United States) Asher Hirsch	4	3
4	(Mexico) H Hach Verdugo (Mexico) MÁ Reyes-Varela	3	6	[7]
(United Kingdom) J Milton (Australia) J-P Smith	6	3	[10]
(United States) C Buchanan (Slovenia) B Rola	6^{3}	6	[7]
WC	(United States) T Kopinski (United States) Dennis Nevolo	7^{7}	3	[10]
WC	(United States) S Kozlov (United States) M Mmoh	2	3
(Republic of Ireland) D O'Hare (United Kingdom) J Salisbury	6	6
(United States) S Bangoura (United States) M Seeberger	6	3	[8]
3	(South Africa) D O'Brien (South Africa) R Roelofse	4	6	[10]
(Colombia) A Falla (Ecuador) G Lapentti
LL	(United Kingdom) D Rice (United Kingdom) M Willis	w/o
(Philippines) R Gonzales (United States) D Nguyen	6^{3}	4
2	(Sweden) J Brunström (Denmark) F Nielsen	7^{7}	6

Quarterfinals
1	(United States) A Krajicek (United States) N Monroe	7^{7}	6
Q	(United Kingdom) D Smethurst (United Kingdom) D Walsh	6^{5}	2
(United Kingdom) J Milton (Australia) J-P Smith	5	6	[10]
WC	(United States) T Kopinski (United States) D Nevolo	7	2	[5]
(Republic of Ireland) D O'Hare (United Kingdom) J Salisbury	6	7^{7}
3	(South Africa) D O'Brien (South Africa) R Roelofse	3	6^{1}
LL	(United Kingdom) D Rice (United Kingdom) M Willis	1	3
2	(Sweden) J Brunström (Denmark) F Nielsen	6	6

Semifinals
1	(United States) A Krajicek (United States) N Monroe	7^{7}	6
(United Kingdom) J Milton (Australia) J-P Smith	6^{3}	2
(Republic of Ireland) D O'Hare (United Kingdom) J Salisbury	4	7^{7}	[10]
2	(Sweden) J Brunström (Denmark) F Nielsen	6	6^{2}	[8]

Final
1	(United States) A Krajicek (United States) N Monroe	1	4
(Republic of Ireland) D O'Hare (United Kingdom) J Salisbury	6	6
