= 2013 Napa Valley Challenger =

- Date: 23–29 September
- Edition: 1st
- Surface: Hard
- Location: Napa, California, United States

Champions

Singles
- (United States) Donald Young

Doubles
- (United States) Bobby Reynolds / (Australia) John-Patrick Smith
Napa Valley Challenger	· 2014 →

The 2013 Napa Valley Challenger was a professional tennis tournament played on hard courts. It was the First edition of the tournament which was part of the 2013 ATP Challenger Tour. It took place in Napa, California, United States between 23 and 29 September 2013.

== Singles main-draw entrants ==
=== Seeds ===
Country	Player	Rank^{1}	Seed
USA	Denis Kudla	95	1
USA	Tim Smyczek	104	2
USA	Rhyne Williams	125	3
USA	Alex Kuznetsov	128	4
USA	Bradley Klahn	133	5
AUS	Matthew Ebden	135	6
USA	Steve Johnson	142	7
USA	Donald Young	143	8

- ^{1} Rankings are as of September 16, 2013.

=== Other entrants ===
The following players received wildcards into the singles main draw:

- (United States) Collin Altamirano
- (New Zealand) Ben McLachlan
- (United States) Dennis Novikov
- (United States) Tim Smyczek

The following players received entry from the qualifying draw:

- (United States) Greg Ouellette
- (Australia) Thanasi Kokkinakis
- (United States) Jesse Witten
- (Bulgaria) Dimitar Kutrovsky

== Champions ==
=== Singles ===
- (United States) Donald Young def. (Australia) Matthew Ebden 4–6, 6–4, 6–2

=== Doubles ===
- (United States) Bobby Reynolds / (Australia) John-Patrick Smith def. (United States) Steve Johnson / (United States) Tim Smyczek 6–4, 7-6(7-2)
