= 2018 Firenze Tennis Cup =

- Date: 1 October – 7 October
- Edition: 1st
- Surface: Clay
- Location: Florence, Italy

Champions

Singles
- (Spain) Pablo Andújar

Doubles
- (Australia) Rameez Junaid / (Netherlands) David Pel
Firenze Tennis Cup	· 2019 →

The 2018 Firenze Tennis Cup was a professional tennis tournament played on clay courts. It was the first edition of the tournament which was part of the 2018 ATP Challenger Tour. It took place in Florence, Italy between 1 October and 7 October 2018.

== Singles main-draw entrants ==
=== Seeds ===
Country	Player	Rank^{1}	Seed
ITA	Lorenzo Sonego	89	1
ESP	Roberto Carballés Baena	94	2
ESP	Pablo Andújar	117	3
ARG	Marco Trungelliti	130	4
ITA	Stefano Travaglia	144	5
~~ITA~~	~~Simone Bolelli~~	~~151~~	~~6~~
ESP	Daniel Gimeno Traver	155	7
ITA	Gianluigi Quinzi	157	8

- ^{1} Rankings are as of 24 September 2018.

=== Other entrants ===
The following players received wildcards into the singles main draw:

- (Italy) Enrico Dalla Valle
- (Italy) Giovanni Fonio
- (Italy) Julian Ocleppo
- (Italy) Andrea Pellegrino

The following players received entry from the qualifying draw:

- (Italy) Francesco Forti
- (Germany) Kevin Krawietz
- (Italy) Gianluca Mager
- (Netherlands) Jelle Sels

The following players received entry as lucky losers:

- (Belgium) Zizou Bergs
- (Brazil) João Menezes

== Champions ==
=== Singles ===
- (Spain) Pablo Andújar def. (Argentina) Marco Trungelliti 7–5, 6–3.

=== Doubles ===
- (Australia) Rameez Junaid / (Netherlands) David Pel def. (Italy) Filippo Baldi / (Italy) Salvatore Caruso, 7–5, 3–6, [10–7].
