= 2015 JSM Challenger of Champaign–Urbana – Singles =

Urbana – Singles
- 2015 JSM Challenger of Champaign–Urbana

Final
- Champion: (Switzerland) Henri Laaksonen
- Runner-up: (United States) Taylor Fritz
- Score: 4–6, 6–2, 6–2

Events
Singles	Doubles
- JSM Challenger of Champaign–Urbana

Henri Laaksonen won the title, defeating Taylor Fritz in the final 4–6, 6–2, 6–2

== Seeds ==
1. (Tunisia) Malek Jaziri (quarterfinals)
2. (United States) Austin Krajicek (quarterfinals)
3. (United States) Ryan Harrison (second round, retired)
4. (Australia) James Duckworth (first round)
5. (Colombia) Alejandro Falla (first round)
6. (Australia) John-Patrick Smith (second round)
7. (United States) Bjorn Fratangelo (first round)
8. (Slovenia) Blaž Rola (second round)

== Draw ==
Key

- Q = Qualifier
- WC = Wild card
- LL = Lucky loser
- Alt = Alternate
- ITF = ITF entry
- PR = Protected ranking
- SR = Special ranking
- SE = Special exempt
- JE = Junior exempt
- JR = Junior Accelerator Programme entrant
- CO = College Accelerator Programme entrant
- NG = Next Gen Accelerator Program entrant
- w/o = Walkover
- r = Retired
- d = Defaulted

=== Finals ===
Semifinals
(United States) Taylor Harry Fritz	6^{4}	6	6
Q	(United States) Mackenzie McDonald	7^{7}	2	2
(Switzerland) Henri Laaksonen	5	6	7^{7}
Q	(United States) Clay Thompson	7	3	6^{2}

Final
(United States) Taylor Harry Fritz	6	2	2
(Switzerland) Henri Laaksonen	4	6	6

=== Top half ===
First round
1	(Tunisia) M Jaziri	6	6
WC	(United States) N Rubin	4	2
(United States) D Nguyen	6	6
WC	(United States) M Mmoh	4	3
(Ecuador) G Lapentti	3	2
(United States) T H Fritz	6	6
(United Kingdom) D Evans	6	6
7	(United States) B Fratangelo	3	3
3	(United States) R Harrison	6	6
(Czech Republic) M Michalička	3	3
WC	(United States) Jared Hiltzik	6	1	0
Q	(United States) M McDonald	3	6	6
(United States) J Donaldson	4	4
(United States) M Krueger	6	6
(United States) D Novikov	6^{2}	2
6	(Australia) J-P Smith	7^{7}	6

Second round
1	(Tunisia) M Jaziri	7	7^{7}
(United States) D Nguyen	5	6^{5}
(United States) T H Fritz	6	3	6
(United Kingdom) D Evans	2	6	4
3	(United States) R Harrison	6	1	0^{r}
Q	(United States) M McDonald	2	6	0
(United States) M Krueger	7	7^{7}
6	(Australia) J-P Smith	5	6^{3}

Quarterfinals
1	(Tunisia) M Jaziri	1	2
(United States) T H Fritz	6	6
Q	(United States) M McDonald	7	6
(United States) M Krueger	5	1

Semifinals
(United States) T H Fritz	6^{4}	6	6
Q	(United States) M McDonald	7^{7}	2	2

=== Bottom half ===
First round
5	(Colombia) A Falla	6	3	2
(United States) F Tiafoe	4	6	6
(United States) E Quigley	6	6
(United States) T Paul	4	3
Q	(United States) C Buchanan	6^{5}	3
(Switzerland) H Laaksonen	7^{7}	6
(Denmark) F Nielsen	6	6
4	(Australia) J Duckworth	3	4
8	(Slovenia) B Rola	6	6
(United Kingdom) L Broady	3	3
WC	(United States) Dennis Nevolo	6	4	6^{2}
Q	(United States) C Thompson	4	6	7^{7}
(Switzerland) A Bossel	6	6
(Slovenia) B Kavčič	2	1
Q	(United States) R Sarmiento	4	4
2	(United States) A Krajicek	6	6

Second round
(United States) F Tiafoe	3	7^{7}	4
(United States) E Quigley	6	6^{3}	6
(Switzerland) H Laaksonen	3	7^{8}	7^{7}
(Denmark) F Nielsen	6	6^{6}	6^{3}
8	(Slovenia) B Rola	6^{4}	3
Q	(United States) C Thompson	7^{7}	6
(Switzerland) A Bossel	6^{3}	3
2	(United States) A Krajicek	7^{7}	6

Quarterfinals
(United States) E Quigley	6	0	1
(Switzerland) H Laaksonen	3	6	6
Q	(United States) C Thompson	4	7	6
2	(United States) A Krajicek	6	5	3

Semifinals
(Switzerland) H Laaksonen	5	6	7^{7}
Q	(United States) C Thompson	7	3	6^{2}
