= 2015 JSM Challenger of Champaign–Urbana =

- Date: 14 November – 21 November
- Edition: 20th
- Surface: Hard
- Location: Champaign, Illinois, United States

Champions

Singles
- (Switzerland) Henri Laaksonen

Doubles
- (Republic of Ireland) David O'Hare / (United Kingdom) Joe Salisbury
← 2014 ·	JSM Challenger of Champaign–Urbana	· 2016 →

The 2015 JSM Challenger of Champaign–Urbana was a professional tennis tournament played on hard courts. It was the twentieth edition of the tournament which was part of the 2015 ATP Challenger Tour. It took place in Champaign, Illinois, United States between November 14 and November 21, 2015.

== Singles main-draw entrants ==
=== Seeds ===
Country	Player	Rank^{1}	Seed
TUN	Malek Jaziri	97	1
USA	Austin Krajicek	101	2
USA	Ryan Harrison	108	3
AUS	James Duckworth	116	4
COL	Alejandro Falla	118	5
AUS	John-Patrick Smith	125	6
USA	Bjorn Fratangelo	130	7
SLO	Blaž Rola	132	8

- ^{1} Rankings are as of November 9, 2015.

=== Other entrants ===
The following players received wildcards into the singles main draw:

- (United States) Jared Hiltzik
- (United States) Michael Mmoh
- (United States) Dennis Nevolo
- (United States) Noah Rubin

The following players received entry from the qualifying draw:

- (United States) Mackenzie McDonald
- (United States) Chase Buchanan
- (United States) Raymond Sarmiento
- (United States) Clay Thompson

== Champions ==
=== Singles ===
- (Switzerland) Henri Laaksonen def. (United States) Taylor Fritz 4–6, 6–2, 6–2

=== Doubles ===
- (Republic of Ireland) David O'Hare / (United Kingdom) Joe Salisbury def. (United States) Austin Krajicek / (United States) Nicholas Monroe 6–1, 6–4
