= Clay Thompson =

American tennis player (born 1992)

- Full name: Clarence Alley Thompson IV
- Country (sports): United States
- Residence: Venice, Los Angeles, U.S.
- Born: May 4, 1992 (age 34) Venice, Los Angeles, U.S.
- Height: 1.98 m (6 ft 6 in)
- Retired: 2017 (last match 2019)
- Plays: Right-handed (two handed-backhand)
- Coach: Scott Bailey
- Prize money: $30,094

Singles
- Career record: 0–1 (at ATP Tour level, Grand Slam level, and in Davis Cup)
- Career titles: 0
- Highest ranking: No. 408 (May 2, 2016)

Doubles
- Career titles: 0
- Highest ranking: No. 760 (March 20, 2017)
- Last updated on: March 27, 2020.

Clarence Alley "Clay" Thompson IV (born May 4, 1992) is an American former professional tennis player. Thompson was born in Venice, CA, and attended 6-12th grade at Crossroads School for Arts and Sciences in Santa Monica, CA. He was a top-ranked national junior and ended his high school career as the #3 recruit in the country, choosing to play for Billy Martin at UCLA. During his tenure at UCLA, Thompson earned a BFA in creative writing with a minor in Film/TV, and during the entirety of his 2014 senior season, was the #1 ranked NCAA tennis player. Thompson holds a 119–35 record, one of the highest number of wins for a UCLA player in the school's history.

Thompson enjoyed a brief career on the ATP Tour, reaching a high singles ranking of #408 in the world, during which he amassed a cult following as a charismatic and fun player to watch. Thompson also participates in various charity events and has been a positive influence in the Los Angeles tennis community. Following his own playing career, Thompson returned to professional tennis as the coach for fellow Crossroads alumnus Nicole Gibbs.

Beginning in 2016, Thompson has been involved with a number of companies as an investor, advisor, and consultant. Notable companies include Snapchat, Jaunt, K-Swiss, and Tennacity. In June 2020, Thompson announced that he was co-founding and leading MProoV, a self-improvement platform and marketplace.

== Junior career ==
From age 13–18, Thompson was a perennial “Top 5” national player in both singles and doubles. Thompson captured his first national ball (bronze), by taking 3rd place in the 2007 USTA Winter SuperNationals in the Boys’ 16s division. Thompson then completed his collection of national balls with a silver and gold ball at the 2008 Easter Bowl, losing to Jack Sock 6–4, 3–6, 7–6 (4) in the singles final and claiming the doubles title only hours later.

In 2007, his freshman year at Crossroads, Thompson led the Roadrunners to their first Boys’ Tennis CIF Championship in school history. Thompson also claimed the CIF Boys’ Singles Championship in 2009, becoming Crossroads School's first individual boys’ tennis state champion.

It was around this time that Thompson's talent was noticed and he was offered a contract to graduate high school early, forgo college and go straight onto the professional tour. Citing his desire for a proper education, a career after tennis and also the social element of finishing his senior year of Crossroads, Thompson declined. Later on that year he committed to play for the UCLA Bruins.

== College career ==
=== Freshman year, 2010-11 ===
Thompson had an immediate impact for the UCLA Bruins, slotting in at #3 singles his freshman year, where he led the team in dual match wins at 23–10. He collected his first All-Pac 10 Player of the Week award when he clinched the 3-3 deciding match at Baylor University, and continued with several more accolades that year, including multiple Muscle Milk Student-Athlete of the Week honors.

=== Sophomore year, 2011-12 ===
Thompson kicked off his sophomore campaign as the #2 singles player, behind 5th year senior Nicolas Meister. He checked in at a high of #35 in the ITA singles rankings and was an integral part of the Bruins’ Final Four appearance at the 2012 NCAA Tournament and Pac-12 championship run. Clay loves to tell a story about his sophomore year:

“My sophomore year, I was slotted in at the #2 position in the beginning of the year. Meister played #1 and we were very deep across the board. We had a shot of winning the title that year, but one major obstacle stood in our way, Steve Johnson and USC. Don’t think I need to go into detail about how good Stevie was, but to put it bluntly he was unbeatable in college tennis. "As USC was our biggest competition in pursuit of an NCAA and Pac-12 title, we had to figure out a way to beat them. Playing #2 for USC was Raymond Sarmiento, someone who has owned me for my entire life since playing in the 8 and unders. Raymond was unbeatable for me, he had such a mental advantage, probably having beaten me upwards of 15/16 times with me never getting a victory. I played him in our first match against USC and lost, Nick lost to Stevie and we lost the match. Billy Martin wanted to change something, so he put me at #1 and Nick at #2 for the next match, I lost to Stevie in ~40 minutes but Nick beat Raymond and we won the match. Furious, Peter Smith protested the lineup and stated that in no world am I the number 1 player for UCLA and we only did it to stack and give Nick the best chance to beat Raymond. The Pac-12 committee decided that Peter was right and moved me back to #2 for our Pac-12 championships. My pride had been wounded and as I took the court against Raymond in Ojai, CA in front of hundreds of fans, I felt something different that day. I beat Raymond in straight sets for the first time in my life and in Vitas Gerulaitis fashion, said at the net, “No one beats Clay Thompson 17 times in a row.”"

=== Junior year, 2012-13 ===
Coming into Thompson’s junior year, the Bruins were heavily favored to be a national championship contender. Following a minor back injury, Thompson began the year at #5 singles and finished the season with a 22-4 overall singles record The Bruins had a strong year, winning both the PAC-12 regular season and tournament before going all the way to the NCAA Finals where they lost to Virginia, after having match points during the very famous “net touch” - when UCLA captain Adrien Puget thought he had won the championship for the Bruins before having the point called back due to his touching of the net with his foot. After this year as a whole, Thompson matured significantly.

Dealing with his injury, Clay shared, “Taking that much time off really opened my eyes,” Thompson said. “I realized how much tennis had done for me, put into perspective how privileged I am through this sport, and made me really honor it a lot more, and really take it seriously.”

Thompson's change in mindset inspired him to work harder than before over the summer. He began the summer by traveling to France with teammate, Adrien Puget, where he competed in three ITF tournaments. After returning from this trip, teammate Marcos Giron noted a difference in Thompson's demeanor. “I was practicing with (Clay) way more over this past summer, and I could see that there was something different about him,” said Giron. “There was an extra spark to him … when he was playing it seemed like he cared more, like there was a little extra passion in it.”

=== Senior year, 2013-14 ===
Thompson's senior season began on a low note as he lost in the first round of the ITA All-American Tournament in Tulsa, Oklahoma. After this loss, however, Thompson won 19 matches in a row. This string of wins started with the consolation draw at the All-American tournament, which booked him a trip to Flushing Meadows, NY and the ITA Fall National Championship. Thompson swiftly moved through the competition to win the tournament and claim his spot on top of the collegiate world. Thompson's behavior was equally as impressive as he turned out large crowds and won the Sportsmanship Award. This tournament also marked the first time that media and fans started actively referring to Thompson as a “showman.”

After this incredible fall season, Thompson began the year as the #1 NCAA player in the country. He compiled one of the highest single season win numbers at UCLA, amassing a 39–7 record. Clay played #1 for the Bruins throughout the entire 2014 season, ending with the Bruins’ loss to Oklahoma 4–2 in the NCAA Semifinals. Thompson cites this match as the biggest regret of his career:

“2014 was the year our entire team came together for the first time in my UCLA experience, everyone on that team had each other’s backs and did everything in their power to win the title. Losing that match, as the #1 player in the country and on the team, remembering how my teammates were cheering me on and how their heads fell as I lost. Man, that memory is harrowing for me and I will never ever forget it.”

Returning from this trip, Thompson finished the remaining classes for his degree and graduated in Spring 2014 with a BFA in creative writing and a minor in film/television. Thompson won many accolades for his 2014 season, including the Pac-12 Scholar Athlete of the Year award due to his excellent athletic season and 3.8 GPA. He also joined a notable list of tennis players, including Steve Johnson and John Isner, when he was named Senior Player of the Year by the Intercollegiate Tennis Association.

== Professional career ==
=== 2010–2013 ===
Thompson played his first doubles match in 2010 at an ITF tournament in California partnering Daniel Kosakowski. In singles, he received wildcards into the qualifying draws of the 2011 and 2012 Farmers Classic located at his college of UCLA. He lost in the first round in 2011 and recorded a win in 2012 but lost in the second round to 5th seed and eventual finalist of the main tournament Ričardas Berankis. He started to increase his activity in 2013 by competing in more tournaments.

=== 2014 ===
2014 is when Thompson started playing tennis consistently. He received wildcards into ATP events including the Indian Wells Masters qualifying draw where he lost in the first round to 23rd seed Bobby Reynolds in straight sets and the only ATP main draw appearance of his career at the Hall of Fame Open where he lost in the first round to 6th seed Steve Johnson in straight sets.

=== 2015 ===
In spring 2015, Thompson won his first professional title at the ITF $10,000 Manzanillo, MX. Continuing on this success, Thompson had a very good summer with Semi-final and Final appearances at $15,000 ITF tournaments in Illinois and he ended the summer with a qualifying draw appearance at the Winston-Salem Open where he lost in the first round to Ryan Harrison in straight sets. He ended the year with the best result of his career; a semifinal appearance at the Champaign Challenger where he qualified for the main draw, won his first main draw match at a challenger, and defeated 8th seed Blaž Rola in the second round and 2nd seed Austin Krajicek in the quarterfinals before losing to Henri Laaksonen in three sets. These results earned Thompson a Top 500 ranking, coming in at #446 in the year end ATP rankings for 2015.

=== 2016 ===
Thompson spent much of 2016 on the road, playing tournaments in Israel, Egypt, South Korea, China and Thailand. Although Thompson's ranking climbed up to #408, he didn't have any notable results. At the 2016 $100,000 USTA Challenger in Aptos, California, Thompson received a wildcard entry and won a round before losing to Bjorn Fratangelo 6–3, 7–5. It was after this tournament that Thompson took to Twitter to announce his retirement.

=== 2017 ===
In January 2017, Thompson played the local ITF $25,000 tournament at USC, and spoke publicly about his retirement, summarizing the financial burden on tennis players coupled with his desire to create a stable life for himself after tennis as the main reasons for his early departure. During the course of this year, Thompson participated in a multitude of charity events and gave many interviews discussing his interest in creating a healthier and more financially feasible pathway for young American tennis talents to transition to the pro tour. He played his last tournament in March at an ITF tournament in Calabasas, California in both the singles and doubles draw losing the singles in the first round and the doubles in the second round. However, he returned for one more tournament in November 2019 at an ITF tournament in Malibu, California in the doubles draw losing in the first round.

== Coaching career ==
In the fall of 2017, fellow Crossroads alumni and top-100 WTA player Nicole Gibbs offered Thompson a job as her coach in 2018. Thompson traveled with Gibbs as a trial run for the end of her 2017 season and then in 2018 accompanied her to the Shenzhen Open where she fell to world #1 Simona Halep 6–4, 6–1. The next tournament was the Australian Open, where Gibbs won a round before losing to Kiki Bertens 6–7, 0–6. Thompson continued to travel with Gibbs, assisting her in Indian Wells, Miami, Monterrey and Bogota before announcing their split.

== Playing style ==
Thompson is known for his fast ground strokes on both his forehand and his backhand and his fast serves. He is also known for showing hyperness on the court usually jumping around or shouting whenever he wins a point.
