= Ross William Guignon =

American tennis player

- Country (sports): United States
- Born: 6 June 1993 (age 32); Prairie Village, Kansas, United States
- Height: 1.78 m (5 ft 10 in)
- Prize money: $1,870

Singles
- Career titles: 0

Doubles
- Career titles: 0
- Highest ranking: No. 613 (17 November 2014)
- Current ranking: No. 613
- Last updated on: 22:58, 19 November 2014 (UTC).

Ross William Guignon (born 6 June 1993) is an American tennis player playing on the ATP Challenger Tour. He was an All-American at the University of Illinois Urbana-Champaign. On 17 November 2014, he reached his highest ATP doubles ranking of 613.

== Tour titles ==
Legend
Grand Slam (0)
ATP Masters Series (0)
ATP Tour (0)
Challengers (1)

=== Doubles: 1 (1-0) ===
Outcome	No.	Date	Tournament	Surface	Partner	Opponents	Score
Winner	1.	15 November 2014	(United States) Champaign	Hard	(United States) Tim Kopinski	(Canada) Frank Dancevic (Canada) Adil Shamasdin	7–6^{(7–2)}, 6–2
