= Adil Shamasdin =

Canadian tennis player

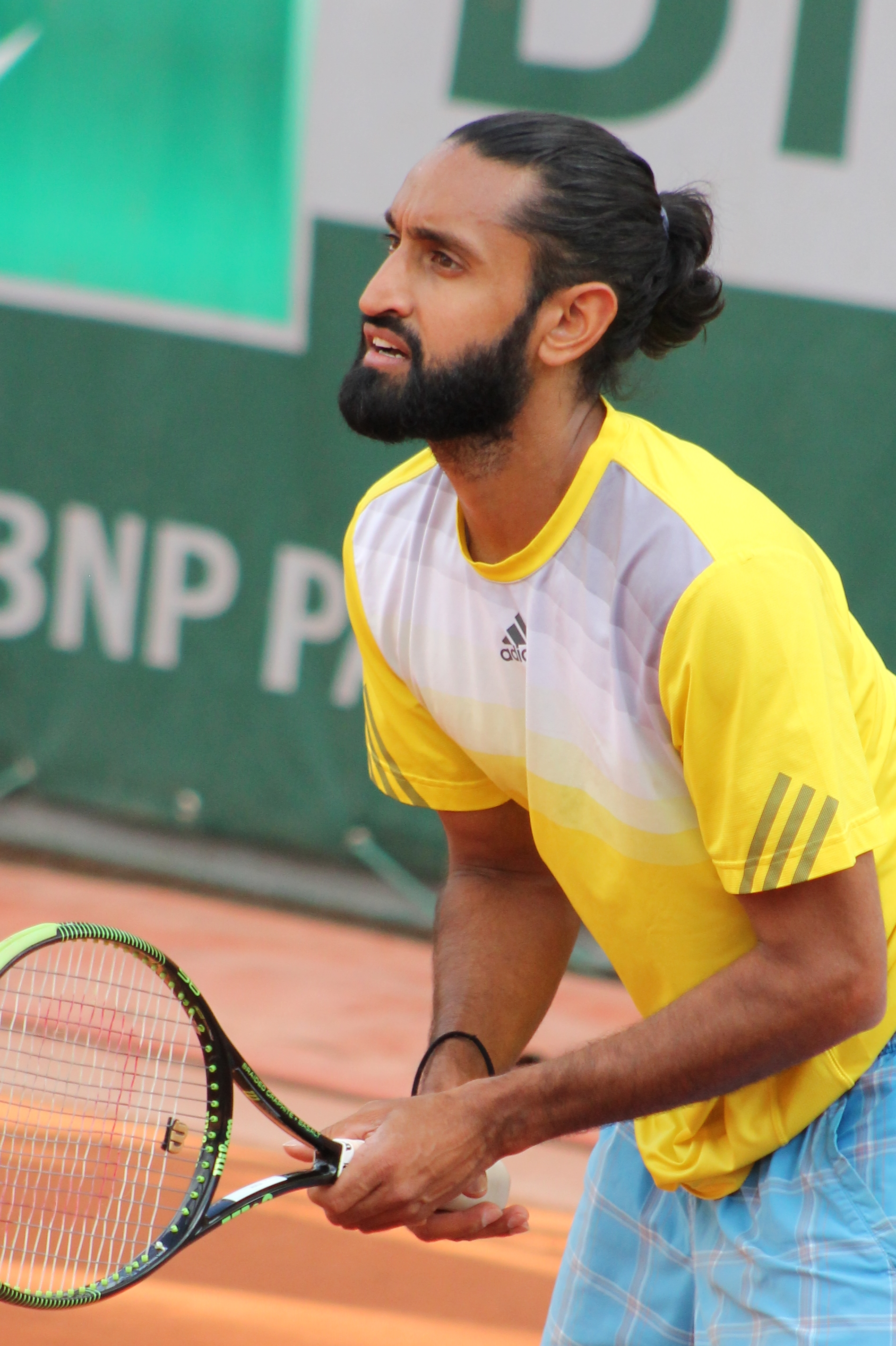
- Country (sports): Canada
- Born: May 23, 1982 (age 43) Toronto, Ontario, Canada
- Height: 1.80 m (5 ft 11 in)
- Turned pro: 2001
- Retired: 2023
- Plays: Right-handed (two-handed backhand)
- College: Brown University
- Prize money: US $690,419

Singles
- Career record: 0–0
- Career titles: 0
- Highest ranking: No. 748 (17 August 2009)

Doubles
- Career record: 77–108
- Career titles: 3
- Highest ranking: No. 41 (26 June 2017)

Grand Slam doubles results
- Australian Open: 2R (2012)
- French Open: 3R (2017)
- Wimbledon: QF (2016)
- US Open: 3R (2015)

Grand Slam mixed doubles results
- Wimbledon: 1R (2015)

Team competitions
- Davis Cup: QF (2015)

Adil Shamasdin (/əˈdiːl ʃəˈmæzɪn/ ə-DEEL shə-MAZ-in; born May 23, 1982) is a Canadian former professional tennis player who specialises in doubles. He reached his highest doubles ranking of world No. 41 on 26 June 2017.

== Tennis career ==
Shamasdin's junior career saw him finish ranked No. 5 in singles and No. 1 in doubles in Canada. In his senior career, he has won so far three ATP World Tour doubles titles, in 2011 at the SA Tennis Open with James Cerretani, in 2015 at the Grand Prix Hassan II with Rameez Junaid and in 2017 at the Lyon Open with Andrés Molteni. He also has won twenty ATP Challenger Tour doubles titles and seven ITF Futures doubles titles. In 2015 in the Davis Cup World Group quarterfinals, he was selected to play his first tie for Canada, losing the doubles match with Daniel Nestor. The next year in the Davis Cup World Group playoffs, he helped his country secure its place in the World Group by winning the match with Vasek Pospisil. In 2016, he reached the quarterfinals at Wimbledon with Jonathan Marray as wildcards, beating the fourth seeds and defending champions Jean-Julien Rojer and Horia Tecău in the opening round, and the fifteenth seeds Pablo Cuevas and Marcel Granollers in the third round. They were defeated by the twelfth seeds Treat Huey and Max Mirnyi. Also in 2016, he advanced to the ATP Masters 1000 Rogers Cup second round for the first time of his career, after six unsuccessful attempts. In the first round, he and compatriot Philip Bester defeated the pair of then world No. 1 singles player Novak Djokovic and Nenad Zimonjić, before losing to the seventh seeds Raven Klaasen and Rajeev Ram in their next match.

== Personal life ==
Shamasdin grew up in Pickering, Ontario. His parents Kamru and Rozi immigrated to Canada from Kenya. He has two brothers Jamil and Irfan. He attended Brown University in Rhode Island and graduated with a degree in psychology. Shamasdin broke the record for the most combined wins (singles and doubles) in Brown tennis history with over 220.

== ATP career finals ==
=== Doubles: 6 (3 titles, 3 runners-up) ===
Legend Grand Slam (0–0) ATP World Tour Finals (0–0) ATP World Tour Masters 1000 (0–0) ATP World Tour 500 Series (0–0) ATP World Tour 250 Series (3–3)	Titles by surface Hard (1–1) Clay (2–0) Grass (0–2)

Result	W–L	Date	Tournament	Tier	Surface	Partner	Opponents	Score
Win	1–0	Feb 2011	Johannesburg, South Africa	250 Series	Hard	(United States) James Cerretani	(United States) Scott Lipsky (United States) Rajeev Ram	6–3, 3–6, [10–7]
Loss	1–1	Jul 2011	Newport, US	250 Series	Grass	(Sweden) Johan Brunström	(United States) Ryan Harrison (Australia) Matthew Ebden	6–4, 3–6, [5–10]
Win	2–1	Apr 2015	Casablanca, Morocco	250 Series	Clay	(Australia) Rameez Junaid	(India) Rohan Bopanna (Romania) Florin Mergea	3–6, 6–2, [10–7]
Loss	2–2	Feb 2016	Sofia, Bulgaria	250 Series	Hard (i)	(Austria) Philipp Oswald	(Netherlands) Wesley Koolhof (Netherlands) Matwé Middelkoop	7–5, 6–7^{(9–11)}, [6–10]
Loss	2–3	Jul 2016	Newport, US	250 Series	Grass	(United Kingdom) Jonathan Marray	(Australia) Sam Groth (Australia) Chris Guccione	4–6, 3–6
Win	3–3	May 2017	Lyon, France	250 Series	Clay	(Argentina) Andrés Molteni	(New Zealand) Marcus Daniell (Brazil) Marcelo Demoliner	6–3, 3–6, [10–5]

== Challenger and Futures finals ==
=== Doubles: 61 (31–30) ===
Legend (doubles) ATP Challenger Tour (24–24) ITF Futures Tour (7–6)	Titles by surface Hard (22–18) Clay (6–11) Grass (2–0) Carpet (1–1)

Result	W–L	Date	Tournament	Tier	Surface	Partner	Opponents	Score
Loss	0–1	Nov 2005	Canada F3, Montreal	Futures	Hard (i)	(Canada) Peter Polansky	(Canada) Clay Donato (United States) Jesse Levine	2–6, 7–6^{(7–5)}, 3–6
Win	1–1	Mar 2008	Canada F3, Sherbrooke	Futures	Hard (i)	(Canada) Daniel Chu	(United States) Travis Rettenmaier (United States) Rylan Rizza	7–6^{(7–2)}, 3–6, [10–7]
Loss	1–2	Jul 2008	Moncton, Canada	Challenger	Hard	(Canada) Daniel Chu	(South Korea) An Jae-sung (Japan) Hiroki Kondo	2–6, 6–2, [10–12]
Loss	1–3	Aug 2008	Great Britain F13, London	Futures	Hard	(Montenegro) Daniel Danilović	(United Kingdom) David Brewer (United Kingdom) Ian Flanagan	4–6, 3–6
Win	2–3	Oct 2008	Mexico F12, Mazatlán	Futures	Hard	(France) Fabrice Martin	(Mexico) Luis Díaz Barriga (Mexico) Daniel Garza	w/o
Win	3–3	Oct 2008	Mexico F13, Ciudad Obregón	Futures	Hard	(France) Fabrice Martin	(United States) Christopher Klingemann (Canada) Milan Pokrajac	3–6, 6–4, [10–7]
Win	4–3	Mar 2009	Canada F3, Sherbrooke	Futures	Hard (i)	(Canada) Daniel Chu	(Canada) Érik Chvojka (Slovakia) Michal Pažický	4–6, 7–6^{(7–5)}, [10–7]
Win	5–3	May 2009	Mexico F4, Coatzacoalcos	Futures	Hard	(Canada) Vasek Pospisil	(Australia) Kaden Hensel (Australia) Adam Hubble	6–3, 6–4
Win	6–3	May 2009	Mexico F5, Puerto Vallarta	Futures	Hard	(Canada) Vasek Pospisil	(Mexico) Juan Manuel Elizondo (Mexico) César Ramírez	6–1, 2–6, [10–7]
Loss	5–4	Jul 2009	France F11, Bourg-en-Bresse	Futures	Clay	(France) Fabrice Martin	(Austria) Andreas Haider-Maurer (Germany) Bastian Knittel	6–3, 5–7, [4–10]
Win	7–4	Jul 2009	France F12, Saint-Gervais	Futures	Clay	(France) Fabrice Martin	(France) Baptiste Dupuy (France) Pierrick Ysern	6–2, 6–4
Loss	7–5	Sep 2009	Freudenstadt, Germany	Challenger	Clay	(Slovakia) Martin Kližan	(Czech Republic) Jan Hájek (Czech Republic) Dušan Karol	6–4, 4–6, [5–10]
Loss	7–6	Sep 2009	France F13, Bagnères-de-Bigorre	Futures	Hard	(France) Fabrice Martin	(China) Gong Maoxin (China) Zhang Ze	4–6, 4–6
Loss	7–7	Oct 2009	France F19, La Roche-sur-Yon	Futures	Hard (i)	(France) Fabrice Martin	(Belgium) Niels Desein (Canada) Pierre-Ludovic Duclos	6–7^{(6–8)}, 6–1, [5–10]
Loss	7–8	Oct 2009	France F20, Rodez	Futures	Hard (i)	(France) Fabrice Martin	(France) Jérémy Blandin (France) Vincent Stouff	7–6^{(7–4)}, 6–7^{(5–7)}, [3–10]
Loss	7–9	Nov 2009	Cancún, Mexico	Challenger	Clay	(United States) Gregory Ouellette	(Germany) Andre Begemann (Portugal) Leonardo Tavares	1–6, 7–6^{(8–6)}, [8–10]
Win	8–9	Nov 2009	Puebla, Mexico	Challenger	Hard	(Canada) Vasek Pospisil	(Spain) Guillermo Olaso (Spain) Pere Riba	7–6^{(9–7)}, 6–0
Loss	8–10	Feb 2010	Dallas, USA	Challenger	Hard (i)	(Canada) Vasek Pospisil	(United States) Scott Lipsky (United States) David Martin	6–7^{(7–9)}, 3–6
Loss	8–11	Mar 2010	Cherbourg, France	Challenger	Hard (i)	(India) Harsh Mankad	(France) Nicolas Mahut (France) Édouard Roger-Vasselin	2–6, 4–6
Loss	8–12	Mar 2010	Marrakech, Morocco	Challenger	Clay	(United States) James Cerretani	(Serbia) Ilija Bozoljac (Romania) Horia Tecău	1–6, 1–6
Loss	8–13	May 2010	Tunis, Tunisia	Challenger	Clay	(United States) James Cerretani	(South Africa) Jeff Coetzee (Belgium) Kristof Vliegen	6–7^{(3–7)}, 3–6
Win	9–13	May 2010	Biella, Italy	Challenger	Clay	(United States) James Cerretani	(Jamaica) Dustin Brown (Italy) Alessandro Motti	6–3, 2–6, [11–9]
Loss	9–14	Jul 2010	Poznań, Poland	Challenger	Clay	(United States) James Cerretani	(Portugal) Rui Machado (Spain) Daniel Muñoz de la Nava	2–6, 3–6
Loss	9–15	Aug 2010	Cordenons, Italy	Challenger	Clay	(United States) James Cerretani	(Netherlands) Robin Haase (Netherlands) Rogier Wassen	6–7^{(14–16)}, 5–7
Win	10–15	Sep 2010	Rijeka, Croatia	Challenger	Clay	(Croatia) Lovro Zovko	(Argentina) Carlos Berlocq (Spain) Rubén Ramírez Hidalgo	1–6, 7–6^{(11–9)}, [10–5]
Loss	10–16	Sep 2010	Banja Luka, Bosnia and Herzegovina	Challenger	Clay	(Croatia) Lovro Zovko	(United States) James Cerretani (Czech Republic) David Škoch	1–6, 4–6
Loss	10–17	Oct 2010	Seoul, Korea, Rep.	Challenger	Hard	(Canada) Vasek Pospisil	(Australia) Rameez Junaid (Germany) Frank Moser	3–6, 4–6
Win	11–17	Feb 2011	Quimper, France	Challenger	Hard (i)	(United States) James Cerretani	(United Kingdom) Jamie Delgado (United Kingdom) Jonathan Marray	6–3, 5–7, [10–5]
Loss	11–18	Mar 2011	Marrakech, Morocco	Challenger	Clay	(United States) James Cerretani	(Australia) Peter Luczak (Italy) Alessandro Motti	6–7^{(5–7)}, 6–7^{(3–7)}
Win	12–18	Jun 2011	Nottingham, Great Britain	Challenger	Grass	(South Africa) Rik de Voest	(Philippines) Treat Huey (South Africa) Izak van der Merwe	6–3, 7–6^{(11–9)}
Loss	12–19	Nov 2011	Eckental, Germany	Challenger	Carpet (i)	(United States) James Cerretani	(Germany) Andre Begemann (Russia) Alexander Kudryavtsev	2–6, 6–3, [9–11]
Loss	12–20	Nov 2011	Geneva, Switzerland	Challenger	Hard	(United States) James Cerretani	(Russia) Igor Andreev (Russia) Evgeny Donskoy	6–7^{(1–7)}, 6–7^{(2–7)}
Win	13–20	Mar 2012	Guadalajara, Mexico	Challenger	Hard	(United States) James Cerretani	(Poland) Tomasz Bednarek (France) Olivier Charroin	7–6^{(7–5)}, 6–1
Win	14–20	Nov 2012	Eckental, Germany	Challenger	Carpet (i)	(United States) James Cerretani	(Poland) Tomasz Bednarek (Sweden) Andreas Siljeström	6–3, 2–6, [10–4]
Win	15–20	Nov 2012	Loughborough, Great Britain	Challenger	Hard (i)	(United States) James Cerretani	(India) Purav Raja (India) Divij Sharan	6–4, 7–5
Win	16–20	Jan 2013	São Paulo, Brazil	Challenger	Hard	(United States) James Cerretani	(Argentina) Federico Delbonis (Argentina) Renzo Olivo	6–7^{(5–7)}, 6–1, [11–9]
Loss	16–21	Aug 2013	Vancouver, Canada	Challenger	Hard	(United States) James Cerretani	(Israel) Jonathan Erlich (Israel) Andy Ram	1–6, 4–6
Win	17–21	Apr 2014	Le Gosier, Guadeloupe	Challenger	Hard	(Poland) Tomasz Bednarek	(Germany) Gero Kretschmer (New Zealand) Michael Venus	7–5, 6–7^{(5–7)}, [10–8]
Win	18–21	May 2014	Tunis, Tunisia	Challenger	Clay	(France) Pierre-Hugues Herbert	(Netherlands) Stephan Fransen (Netherlands) Jesse Huta Galung	6–3, 7–6^{(7–5)}
Loss	18–22	Jun 2014	Prostějov, Czech Republic	Challenger	Clay	(Canada) Peter Polansky	(Germany) Andre Begemann (Czech Republic) Lukáš Rosol	1–6, 2–6
Win	19–22	Jul 2014	Lexington, USA	Challenger	Hard	(Canada) Peter Polansky	(United States) Chase Buchanan (Republic of Ireland) James McGee	6–4, 6–2
Win	20–22	Sep 2014	Napa, USA	Challenger	Hard	(Canada) Peter Polansky	(United States) Bradley Klahn (United States) Tim Smyczek	7–6^{(7–0)}, 6–1
Loss	20–23	Oct 2014	Sacramento, USA	Challenger	Hard	(Canada) Peter Polansky	(Australia) Adam Hubble (Australia) John-Patrick Smith	3–6, 2–6
Win	21–23	Oct 2014	Tiburon, USA	Challenger	Hard	(United States) Bradley Klahn	(Australia) Carsten Ball (Australia) Matt Reid	7–5, 6–2
Loss	21–24	Nov 2014	Champaign, USA	Challenger	Hard (i)	(Canada) Frank Dancevic	(United States) Ross William Guignon (United States) Tim Kopinski	6–7^{(2–7)}, 2–6
Loss	21–25	Mar 2015	Cherbourg, France	Challenger	Hard (i)	(Australia) Rameez Junaid	(Germany) Andreas Beck (Czech Republic) Jan Mertl	2–6, 6–3, [3–10]
Loss	21–26	Apr 2015	Raanana, Israel	Challenger	Hard	(Australia) Rameez Junaid	(Croatia) Mate Pavić (New Zealand) Michael Venus	1–6, 4–6
Loss	21–27	Nov 2015	Charlottesville, USA	Challenger	Hard (i)	(Canada) Peter Polansky	(United States) Chase Buchanan (United States) Tennys Sandgren	6–3, 4–6, [5–10]
Win	22–27	Nov 2016	Knoxville, USA	Challenger	Hard (i)	(Canada) Peter Polansky	(Belgium) Ruben Bemelmans (Belgium) Joris De Loore	6–1, 6–3
Win	23–27	Feb 2017	Bergamo, Italy	Challenger	Hard (i)	(Austria) Julian Knowle	(Croatia) Dino Marcan (Austria) Tristan-Samuel Weissborn	6–3, 6–3
Win	24–27	Mar 2017	Wrocław, Poland	Challenger	Hard (i)	(Belarus) Andrei Vasilevski	(Russia) Mikhail Elgin (Ukraine) Denys Molchanov	6–3, 3–6, [21–19]
Win	25–27	Mar 2017	Drummondville, Canada	Challenger	Hard (i)	(Australia) Sam Groth	(Australia) Matt Reid (Australia) John-Patrick Smith	6–3, 2–6, [10–8]
Win	26–27	Apr 2017	León, Mexico	Challenger	Hard	(India) Leander Paes	(Switzerland) Luca Margaroli (Brazil) Caio Zampieri	6–1, 6–4
Loss	26–28	May 2017	Heilbronn, Germany	Challenger	Clay	(Slovakia) Igor Zelenay	(Czech Republic) Roman Jebavý (Croatia) Antonio Šančić	4–6, 1–6
Win	27–28	Jun 2017	Ilkley, Great Britain	Challenger	Grass	(India) Leander Paes	(United Kingdom) Brydan Klein (United Kingdom) Joe Salisbury	6–2, 2–6, [10–8]
Win	28–28	May 2018	Braga, Portugal	Challenger	Clay	(Netherlands) Sander Arends	(Uruguay) Ariel Behar (Mexico) Miguel Ángel Reyes-Varela	6–2, 6–1
Win	29–28	Mar 2019	Pau, France	Challenger	Hard (i)	(United Kingdom) Scott Clayton	(Netherlands) Sander Arends (Austria) Tristan-Samuel Weissborn	7–6^{(7–4)}, 5–7, [10–8]
Win	30–28	Mar 2019	Drummondville, Canada	Challenger	Hard (i)	(United Kingdom) Scott Clayton	(Australia) Matt Reid (Australia) John-Patrick Smith	7–5, 3–6, [10–5]
Loss	30-29	July 2019	Winnipeg, Canada	Challenger	Hard	(United States) Hunter Reese	(Canada) Peter Polansky (Barbados) Darian King	6-7^{(8-10)}, 3–6
Loss	30-30	Aug 2019	Vancouver, Canada	Challenger	Hard	(Philippines) Treat Huey	(Sweden) Robert Lindstedt (United Kingdom) Jonny O'Mara	2-6, 5-7
Win	31–30	Sep 2019	Florence, Italy	Challenger	Clay	(Switzerland) Luca Margaroli	(Spain) Gerard Granollers (Spain) Pedro Martínez	7-5, 6–7^{(6–8)}, [14-12]

== Doubles performance timeline ==
Key
W	F	SF	QF	#R	RR	Q#	P#	DNQ	A	Z#	PO	G	S	B	NMS	NTI	P	NH

(W) winner; (F) finalist; (SF) semifinalist; (QF) quarterfinalist; (#R) rounds 4, 3, 2, 1; (RR) round-robin stage; (Q#) qualification round; (P#) preliminary round; (DNQ) did not qualify; (A) absent; (Z#) Davis/Fed Cup Zonal Group (with number indication) or (PO) play-off; (G) gold, (S) silver or (B) bronze Olympic/Paralympic medal; (NMS) not a Masters tournament; (NTI) not a Tier I tournament; (P) postponed; (NH) not held; (SR) strike rate (events won / competed); (W–L) win–loss record.
To avoid confusion and double counting, these charts are updated at the conclusion of a tournament or when the player's participation has ended.

This table is current through the 2023 Canadian Open.

Tournament	2008	2009	2010	2011	2012	2013	2014	2015	2016	2017	2018	2019	2020	2021	2022	2023	SR	W–L	Win %
Grand Slam tournaments
Australian Open	A	A	A	A	2R	A	A	1R	1R	1R	1R	A	A	A	A	A	0 / 5	1–5	17%
French Open	A	A	1R	1R	2R	A	A	1R	A	3R	1R	A	A	A	A	A	0 / 6	3–6	33%
Wimbledon	A	A	Q1	2R	Q2	Q1	Q1	1R	QF	1R	A	A	NH	A	A	A	0 / 4	4–4	50%
US Open	A	A	A	1R	A	A	A	3R	1R	1R	A	A	A	A	A		0 / 4	2–4	33%
Win–loss	0–0	0–0	0–1	1–3	2–2	0–0	0–0	2–4	3–3	2–4	0–2	0–0	0–0	0–0	0–0	0–0	0 / 19	10–19	34%
National representation
Davis Cup	A	A	A	A	A	A	A	QF	PO	A	A	A	NH	A	A		0 / 1	1–1	50%
ATP World Tour Masters 1000
Canadian Open	A	A	1R	1R	1R	1R	1R	1R	2R	1R	A	A	NH	A	A	1R	0 / 9	1–9	10%
Win–loss	0–0	0–0	0–1	0–1	0–1	0–1	0–1	0–1	1–1	0–1	0–0	0–0	0–0	0–0	0–0	0–1	0 / 9	1–9	10%
Career statistics
	2008	2009	2010	2011	2012	2013	2014	2015	2016	2017	2018	2019	2020	2021	2022	2023	SR	W–L	Win %
Tournaments	0	0	6	16	12	7	7	18	16	17	7	0	0	1	0	1	108		
Titles	0	0	0	1	0	0	0	1	0	1	0	0	0	0	0	0	3		
Finals	0	0	0	2	0	0	0	1	2	1	0	0	0	0	0	0	6		
Hard win–loss	0–0	0–0	0–1	6–7	2–8	1–6	3–6	10–9	10–12	3–10	2–3	0–0	0–2	1–1	0–0	0–1	1 / 65	38–66	37%
Clay win–loss	0–0	0–0	1–4	5–5	1–2	0–0	0–0	6–7	0–1	9–3	1–4	0–0	0–0	0–0	0–0	0–0	2 / 24	23–26	47%
Grass win–loss	0–0	0–0	0–1	4–3	1–2	1–1	1–1	0–2	6–3	3–3	0–0	0–0	0–0	0–0	0–0	0–0	0 / 19	16–16	50%
Overall win–loss	0–0	0–0	1–6	15–15	4–12	2–7	4–7	16–18	16–16	15–16	3–7	0–0	0–2	1–1	0–0	0–1	3 / 108	77–108	42%
Win %	–	–	14%	50%	25%	22%	36%	47%	50%	48%	30%	–	0%	50%	–	0%	42%		
Year-end ranking	454	182	87	61	98	120	75	69	68	62	145	138	196	270	–				
