= Tim Kopinski =

American tennis player (born 1993)

- Full name: Timothy Jan Kopinski
- Country (sports): United States
- Born: 2 June 1993 (age 31); Palos Hills, Illinois, United States
- Height: 1.83 m (6 ft 0 in)
- Prize money: $4,394

Singles
- Career record: 0–2
- Career titles: 0
- Highest ranking: No. 1940 (5 August 2013)

Doubles
- Career record: 5–2
- Career titles: 0
- Highest ranking: No. 615 (17 November 2014)
- Current ranking: No. 615
- Last updated on: 23:05, 19 November 2014 (UTC).

Timothy Jan Kopinski (born 2 June 1993) is an American tennis player. On 5 August 2013, he reached his highest ATP singles ranking of 1940 and his highest doubles ranking of 615 achieved on 17 November 2014.

== Tour titles ==
Legend
Grand Slam (0)
ATP Masters Series (0)
ATP Tour (0)
Challengers (1)

=== Doubles: 1 (1-0) ===
Outcome	No.	Date	Tournament	Surface	Partner	Opponents	Score
Winner	1.	15 November 2014	(United States) Champaign	Hard	(United States) Ross William Guignon	(Canada) Frank Dancevic (Canada) Adil Shamasdin	7–6^{7–2}, 6–2
