= Firenze Tennis Cup =

- 2019 Firenze Tennis Cup

ATP Challenger Tour
- Event name: Firenze Tennis Cup
- Location: Florence, Italy
- Venue: Circolo del Tennis Firenze 1898
- Category: ATP Challenger Tour
- Surface: Clay
- Draw: 32S/32Q/16D
- Website: Website

The Firenze Tennis Cup was a professional tennis tournament played on clay courts. It was part of the ATP Challenger Tour. It was held annually in Florence, Italy in 2018 and 2019.

== Past finals ==
=== Singles ===
Year	Champion	Runner-up	Score
2019	(Argentina) Marco Trungelliti	(Portugal) Pedro Sousa	6–2, 6–3
2018	(Spain) Pablo Andújar	(Argentina) Marco Trungelliti	7–5, 6–3

=== Doubles ===
Year	Champions	Runners-up	Score
2019	(Switzerland) Luca Margaroli (Canada) Adil Shamasdin	(Spain) Gerard Granollers (Spain) Pedro Martínez	7–5, 6–7^{(6–8)}, [14–12]
2018	(Australia) Rameez Junaid (Netherlands) David Pel	(Italy) Filippo Baldi (Italy) Salvatore Caruso	7–5, 3–6, [10–7]
