= Napa Valley Challenger =

- 2014 Napa Valley Challenger

Defunct tennis tournament
- Location: Napa, California; United States
- Venue: Napa Valley Country Club
- Category: ATP Challenger Series
- Surface: Hard
- Draw: 32S/32Q/16D
- Prize money: $50,000
- Website: Website

The Napa Valley Challenger was a tennis tournament held in Napa, California, United States, in 2013 and 2014. The event was part of the ATP Challenger Tour and was played on outdoor hardcourts at the Napa Valley Country Club.

== Past finals ==
=== Singles ===
Year	Champion	Runner-up	Score
2014	(United States) Sam Querrey	(United States) Tim Smyczek	6–3, 6–1
2013	(United States) Donald Young	(Australia) Matthew Ebden	4–6, 6–4, 6–2

=== Doubles ===
Year	Champions	Runners-up	Score
2014	(Canada) Peter Polansky (Canada) Adil Shamasdin	(United States) Bradley Klahn (United States) Tim Smyczek	7–6^{(7–0)}, 6–1
2013	(United States) Bobby Reynolds (Australia) John-Patrick Smith	(United States) Steve Johnson (United States) Tim Smyczek	6–4, 7–6^{(7–2)}
