= 2017 ATP Challenger Tour =

Details
- Duration: 2 January 2017 – 26 November 2017
- Edition: 40th (9th under this name)
- Tournaments: 155
- Categories: Challenger 125 (12); Challenger 110 (11); Challenger 100 (12); Challenger 90 (29); Challenger 80 (91)

Achievements (singles)
- Most titles: (Serbia) Filip Krajinović (5)
- Most finals: (Japan) Taro Daniel (Serbia) Laslo Đere (Italy) Thomas Fabbiano (Chile) Nicolás Jarry (Slovenia) Blaž Kavčič (Serbia) Filip Krajinović (United States) Tennys Sandgren (5)

The ATP Challenger Tour, in 2017, was the secondary men's professional tennis circuit organized by the ATP. The 2017 ATP Challenger Tour calendar comprises 155 tournaments, with prize money ranging from $50,000 up to $150,000. It was the 40th edition of the challenger tournaments cycle, and 9th under the name of Challenger Tour.

== Schedule ==
This is the complete schedule of events on the 2017 calendar, with player progression documented from the quarterfinals stage.

=== January ===
Week of	Tournament	Champions	Runners-up	Semifinalists	Quarterfinalists
January 2	BNP Paribas de Nouvelle-Calédonie; Nouméa, New Caledonia; Hard – $75,000+H – 32S/32Q/15D; Singles – Doubles	(France) Adrian Mannarino; 6–3, 7–5	(Serbia) Nikola Milojević	(Colombia) Alejandro Falla (Spain) Roberto Carballés Baena	(France) Kenny de Schepper (France) Tristan Lamasine (France) Mathias Bourgue (Spain) Adrián Menéndez Maceiras
January 2	BNP Paribas de Nouvelle-Calédonie; Nouméa, New Caledonia; Hard – $75,000+H – 32S/32Q/15D; Singles – Doubles	(France) Quentin Halys (France) Tristan Lamasine; 7–6^{(11–9)}, 6–1	(Spain) Adrián Menéndez Maceiras (Italy) Stefano Napolitano	(Colombia) Alejandro Falla (Spain) Roberto Carballés Baena	(France) Kenny de Schepper (France) Tristan Lamasine (France) Mathias Bourgue (Spain) Adrián Menéndez Maceiras
January 2	City of Onkaparinga ATP Challenger; Happy Valley, Australia; Hard – $75,000 – 32S/32Q/16D; Singles – Doubles	(Germany) Peter Gojowczyk; 6–3, 6–1	(Australia) Omar Jasika	(United States) Denis Kudla (Belgium) Joris De Loore	(Belgium) Ruben Bemelmans (Barbados) Darian King (Canada) Peter Polansky (Hungary) Márton Fucsovics
January 2	City of Onkaparinga ATP Challenger; Happy Valley, Australia; Hard – $75,000 – 32S/32Q/16D; Singles – Doubles	(Chile) Hans Podlipnik Castillo (United States) Max Schnur; 7–6^{(7–5)}, 4–6, [10–6]	(Australia) Steven de Waard (Australia) Marc Polmans	(United States) Denis Kudla (Belgium) Joris De Loore	(Belgium) Ruben Bemelmans (Barbados) Darian King (Canada) Peter Polansky (Hungary) Márton Fucsovics
January 2	Bangkok Challenger; Bangkok, Thailand; Hard – $50,000+H – 32S/32Q/16D; Singles – Doubles	(Serbia) Janko Tipsarević; 6–3, 7–6^{(7–1)}	(Slovenia) Blaž Kavčič	(Japan) Yūichi Sugita (Germany) Maximilian Marterer	(Germany) Jeremy Jahn (Belgium) Yannick Mertens (Romania) Marius Copil (Chile) Cristian Garín
January 2	Bangkok Challenger; Bangkok, Thailand; Hard – $50,000+H – 32S/32Q/16D; Singles – Doubles	(France) Grégoire Barrère (France) Jonathan Eysseric; 6–3, 6–2	(Japan) Yūichi Sugita (China) Wu Di	(Japan) Yūichi Sugita (Germany) Maximilian Marterer	(Germany) Jeremy Jahn (Belgium) Yannick Mertens (Romania) Marius Copil (Chile) Cristian Garín
January 9	Canberra Challenger; Canberra, Australia; Hard – $75,000 – 32S/32Q/16D; Singles – Doubles	(Israel) Dudi Sela; 3–6, 6–4, 6–3	(Germany) Jan-Lennard Struff	(Belgium) Steve Darcis (Colombia) Alejandro Falla	(Russia) Konstantin Kravchuk (Canada) Denis Shapovalov (Argentina) Carlos Berlocq (Australia) Sam Groth
January 9	Canberra Challenger; Canberra, Australia; Hard – $75,000 – 32S/32Q/16D; Singles – Doubles	(Germany) Andre Begemann (Germany) Jan-Lennard Struff; 6–3, 6–4	(Argentina) Carlos Berlocq (Argentina) Andrés Molteni	(Belgium) Steve Darcis (Colombia) Alejandro Falla	(Russia) Konstantin Kravchuk (Canada) Denis Shapovalov (Argentina) Carlos Berlocq (Australia) Sam Groth
January 9	Bangkok Challenger II; Bangkok, Thailand; Hard – $50,000+H – 32S/32Q/16D; Singles – Doubles	(Serbia) Janko Tipsarević; 6–2, 6–3	(China) Li Zhe	(Germany) Daniel Altmaier (Chile) Cristian Garín	(France) Axel Michon (Japan) Shuichi Sekiguchi (Germany) Yannick Maden (Estonia) Jürgen Zopp
January 9	Bangkok Challenger II; Bangkok, Thailand; Hard – $50,000+H – 32S/32Q/16D; Singles – Doubles	(Thailand) Sanchai Ratiwatana (Thailand) Sonchat Ratiwatana; 7–6^{(7–4)}, 7–5	(France) Sadio Doumbia (France) Fabien Reboul	(Germany) Daniel Altmaier (Chile) Cristian Garín	(France) Axel Michon (Japan) Shuichi Sekiguchi (Germany) Yannick Maden (Estonia) Jürgen Zopp
January 16	Koblenz Open; Koblenz, Germany; Hard (i) – €43,000+H – 32S/32Q/16D; Singles – Doubles	(Belgium) Ruben Bemelmans; 6–4, 3–6, 7–6^{(7–0)}	(Germany) Nils Langer	(Germany) Jeremy Jahn (Germany) Daniel Masur	(Serbia) Filip Krajinović (France) Kenny de Schepper (Germany) Daniel Brands (Germany) Cedrik-Marcel Stebe
January 16	Koblenz Open; Koblenz, Germany; Hard (i) – €43,000+H – 32S/32Q/16D; Singles – Doubles	(Chile) Hans Podlipnik Castillo (Belarus) Andrei Vasilevski; 7–5, 3–6, [16–14]	(Czech Republic) Roman Jebavý (Czech Republic) Lukáš Rosol	(Germany) Jeremy Jahn (Germany) Daniel Masur	(Serbia) Filip Krajinović (France) Kenny de Schepper (Germany) Daniel Brands (Germany) Cedrik-Marcel Stebe
January 23	Open de Rennes; Rennes, France; Hard (i) – €85,000+H – 32S/32Q/16D; Singles – Doubles	(Belarus) Uladzimir Ignatik; 6–7^{(6–8)}, 6–3, 7–6^{(7–5)}	(Russia) Andrey Rublev	(Slovenia) Blaž Kavčič (France) Mathias Bourgue	(South Korea) Lee Duck-hee (France) Vincent Millot (Russia) Teymuraz Gabashvili (France) Paul-Henri Mathieu
January 23	Open de Rennes; Rennes, France; Hard (i) – €85,000+H – 32S/32Q/16D; Singles – Doubles	(Russia) Evgeny Donskoy (Russia) Mikhail Elgin; 6–4, 3–6, [11–9]	(Austria) Julian Knowle (United Kingdom) Jonathan Marray	(Slovenia) Blaž Kavčič (France) Mathias Bourgue	(South Korea) Lee Duck-hee (France) Vincent Millot (Russia) Teymuraz Gabashvili (France) Paul-Henri Mathieu
January 23	Tennis Championships of Maui; Maui, United States; Hard – $75,000 – 32S/32Q/16D; Singles – Doubles	(South Korea) Chung Hyeon; 7–6^{(7–3)}, 6–1	(Japan) Taro Daniel	(United Kingdom) Cameron Norrie (Switzerland) Henri Laaksonen	(United States) Alexander Sarkissian (United States) Mitchell Krueger (United States) Tennys Sandgren (United States) Michael Mmoh
January 23	Tennis Championships of Maui; Maui, United States; Hard – $75,000 – 32S/32Q/16D; Singles – Doubles	(United States) Austin Krajicek (United States) Jackson Withrow; 6–4, 6–3	(United States) Bradley Klahn (United States) Tennys Sandgren	(United Kingdom) Cameron Norrie (Switzerland) Henri Laaksonen	(United States) Alexander Sarkissian (United States) Mitchell Krueger (United States) Tennys Sandgren (United States) Michael Mmoh
January 30	RBC Tennis Championships of Dallas; Dallas, United States; Hard (i) – $125,000 – 32S/32Q/16D; Singles – Doubles	(United States) Ryan Harrison; 6–3, 6–3	(United States) Taylor Fritz	(Japan) Tatsuma Ito (United States) Denis Kudla	(Argentina) Marco Trungelliti (Sweden) Elias Ymer (United States) Frances Tiafoe (United States) Rajeev Ram
January 30	RBC Tennis Championships of Dallas; Dallas, United States; Hard (i) – $125,000 – 32S/32Q/16D; Singles – Doubles	(Republic of Ireland) David O'Hare (United Kingdom) Joe Salisbury; 6–7^{(6–8)}, 6–3, [11–9]	(India) Jeevan Nedunchezhiyan (Indonesia) Christopher Rungkat	(Japan) Tatsuma Ito (United States) Denis Kudla	(Argentina) Marco Trungelliti (Sweden) Elias Ymer (United States) Frances Tiafoe (United States) Rajeev Ram
January 30	Burnie International; Burnie, Australia; Hard – $75,000 – 32S/32Q/16D; Singles – Doubles	(Australia) Omar Jasika; 6–2, 6–2	(Australia) Blake Mott	(Japan) Akira Santillan (Kazakhstan) Dmitry Popko	(Australia) Alex Bolt (Australia) Maverick Banes (Australia) Matthew Ebden (Australia) Christopher O'Connell
January 30	Burnie International; Burnie, Australia; Hard – $75,000 – 32S/32Q/16D; Singles – Doubles	(United Kingdom) Brydan Klein (Australia) Dane Propoggia; 6–3, 6–4	(Australia) Steven de Waard (Australia) Luke Saville	(Japan) Akira Santillan (Kazakhstan) Dmitry Popko	(Australia) Alex Bolt (Australia) Maverick Banes (Australia) Matthew Ebden (Australia) Christopher O'Connell
January 30	Open BNP Paribas Banque de Bretagne; Quimper, France; Hard (i) – €43,000+H – 32S/32Q/16D; Singles – Doubles	(France) Adrian Mannarino; 6–4, 6–4	(Germany) Peter Gojowczyk	(France) Quentin Halys (Russia) Andrey Rublev	(France) Gleb Sakharov (Russia) Aslan Karatsev (Ukraine) Sergiy Stakhovsky (France) Tristan Lamasine
January 30	Open BNP Paribas Banque de Bretagne; Quimper, France; Hard (i) – €43,000+H – 32S/32Q/16D; Singles – Doubles	(Russia) Mikhail Elgin (Slovakia) Igor Zelenay; 2–6, 7–5, [10–5]	(United Kingdom) Ken Skupski (United Kingdom) Neal Skupski	(France) Quentin Halys (Russia) Andrey Rublev	(France) Gleb Sakharov (Russia) Aslan Karatsev (Ukraine) Sergiy Stakhovsky (France) Tristan Lamasine

=== February ===
Week of	Tournament	Champions	Runners-up	Semifinalists	Quarterfinalists
February 6	Kunal Patel San Francisco Open; San Francisco, United States; Hard (i) – $100,000 – 32S/32Q/14D; Singles – Doubles	(China) Zhang Ze; 7–5, 3–6, 6–2	(Canada) Vasek Pospisil	(United States) Michael Mmoh (Switzerland) Henri Laaksonen	(United States) Frances Tiafoe (United States) Denis Kudla (United States) Eric Quigley (Japan) Tatsuma Ito
February 6	Kunal Patel San Francisco Open; San Francisco, United States; Hard (i) – $100,000 – 32S/32Q/14D; Singles – Doubles	(Australia) Matt Reid (Australia) John-Patrick Smith; 6–7^{(4–7)}, 7–5, [10–7]	(China) Gong Maoxin (China) Zhang Ze	(United States) Michael Mmoh (Switzerland) Henri Laaksonen	(United States) Frances Tiafoe (United States) Denis Kudla (United States) Eric Quigley (Japan) Tatsuma Ito
February 6	Launceston Tennis International; Launceston, Australia; Hard – $75,000 – 32S/32Q/15D; Singles – Doubles	(United States) Noah Rubin; 6–0, 6–1	(United States) Mitchell Krueger	(Egypt) Mohamed Safwat (United States) Daniel Nguyen	(Australia) Alex Bolt (Chinese Taipei) Yang Tsung-hua (Australia) Andrew Whittington (Italy) Riccardo Bellotti
February 6	Launceston Tennis International; Launceston, Australia; Hard – $75,000 – 32S/32Q/15D; Singles – Doubles	(Australia) Bradley Mousley (Australia) Luke Saville; 6–2, 6–1	(Australia) Alex Bolt (Australia) Andrew Whittington	(Egypt) Mohamed Safwat (United States) Daniel Nguyen	(Australia) Alex Bolt (Chinese Taipei) Yang Tsung-hua (Australia) Andrew Whittington (Italy) Riccardo Bellotti
February 6	Hungarian Challenger Open; Budapest, Hungary; Hard (i) – €64,000 – 32S/32Q/16D; Singles – Doubles	(Austria) Jürgen Melzer; 7–6^{(8–6)}, 6–2	(Hungary) Márton Fucsovics	(Norway) Casper Ruud (United Kingdom) Edward Corrie	(Russia) Alexey Vatutin (Italy) Luca Vanni (Romania) Marius Copil (Germany) Yannick Maden
February 6	Hungarian Challenger Open; Budapest, Hungary; Hard (i) – €64,000 – 32S/32Q/16D; Singles – Doubles	(Croatia) Dino Marcan (Austria) Tristan-Samuel Weissborn; 6–3, 3–6, [16–14]	(Slovenia) Blaž Kavčič (Croatia) Franko Škugor	(Norway) Casper Ruud (United Kingdom) Edward Corrie	(Russia) Alexey Vatutin (Italy) Luca Vanni (Romania) Marius Copil (Germany) Yannick Maden
February 13	Challenger La Manche; Cherbourg-en-Cotentin, France; Hard (i) – €43,000+H – 32S/32Q/16D; Singles – Doubles	(France) Mathias Bourgue; 6–3, 7–6^{(7–3)}	(Germany) Maximilian Marterer	(France) Kenny de Schepper (France) Julien Benneteau	(France) Corentin Moutet (Slovakia) Norbert Gombos (Germany) Peter Gojowczyk (France) Maxime Janvier
February 13	Challenger La Manche; Cherbourg-en-Cotentin, France; Hard (i) – €43,000+H – 32S/32Q/16D; Singles – Doubles	(Czech Republic) Roman Jebavý (Slovakia) Igor Zelenay; 7–6^{(7–4)}, 6–7^{(4–7)}, [10–6]	(Croatia) Dino Marcan (Austria) Tristan-Samuel Weissborn	(France) Kenny de Schepper (France) Julien Benneteau	(France) Corentin Moutet (Slovakia) Norbert Gombos (Germany) Peter Gojowczyk (France) Maxime Janvier
February 13	Tempe Challenger; Tempe, United States; Hard – $75,000 – 32S/32Q/16D; Singles – Doubles	(United States) Tennys Sandgren; 4–6, 6–0, 6–3	(Serbia) Nikola Milojević	(United States) Dennis Novikov (Russia) Teymuraz Gabashvili	(United States) Ernesto Escobedo (Argentina) Marco Trungelliti (Dominican Republic) José Hernández-Fernández (United States) Stefan Kozlov
February 13	Tempe Challenger; Tempe, United States; Hard – $75,000 – 32S/32Q/16D; Singles – Doubles	(Italy) Walter Trusendi (Italy) Matteo Viola; 5–7, 6–2, [12–10]	(El Salvador) Marcelo Arévalo (Dominican Republic) José Hernández-Fernández	(United States) Dennis Novikov (Russia) Teymuraz Gabashvili	(United States) Ernesto Escobedo (Argentina) Marco Trungelliti (Dominican Republic) José Hernández-Fernández (United States) Stefan Kozlov
February 20	Morelos Open; Cuernavaca, Mexico; Hard – $50,000+H – 32S/32Q/16D; Singles – Doubles	(Kazakhstan) Alexander Bublik; 7–6^{(7–5)}, 6–4	(Chile) Nicolás Jarry	(United States) Austin Krajicek (Colombia) Eduardo Struvay	(Mexico) Manuel Sánchez (Ecuador) Iván Endara (Colombia) Alejandro Gómez (Ecuador) Emilio Gómez
February 20	Morelos Open; Cuernavaca, Mexico; Hard – $50,000+H – 32S/32Q/16D; Singles – Doubles	(United States) Austin Krajicek (United States) Jackson Withrow; 6–7^{(4–7)}, 7–6^{(7–5)}, [11–9]	(United States) Kevin King (South Africa) Dean O'Brien	(United States) Austin Krajicek (Colombia) Eduardo Struvay	(Mexico) Manuel Sánchez (Ecuador) Iván Endara (Colombia) Alejandro Gómez (Ecuador) Emilio Gómez
February 20	Trofeo Faip–Perrel; Bergamo, Italy; Hard (i) – €64,000+H – 32S/32Q/16D; Singles – Doubles	(Poland) Jerzy Janowicz; 6–4, 6–4	(France) Quentin Halys	(Kazakhstan) Andrey Golubev (Serbia) Filip Krajinović	(Germany) Yannick Hanfmann (Italy) Matteo Berrettini (France) Rémi Boutillier (Belarus) Egor Gerasimov
February 20	Trofeo Faip–Perrel; Bergamo, Italy; Hard (i) – €64,000+H – 32S/32Q/16D; Singles – Doubles	(Austria) Julian Knowle (Canada) Adil Shamasdin; 6–3, 6–3	(Croatia) Dino Marcan (Austria) Tristan-Samuel Weissborn	(Kazakhstan) Andrey Golubev (Serbia) Filip Krajinović	(Germany) Yannick Hanfmann (Italy) Matteo Berrettini (France) Rémi Boutillier (Belarus) Egor Gerasimov
February 20	Shimadzu All Japan Indoor Tennis Championships; Kyoto, Japan; Carpet (i) – $50,000+H – 32S/32Q/16D; Singles – Doubles	(Japan) Yasutaka Uchiyama; 6–3, 6–4	(Slovenia) Blaž Kavčič	(South Africa) Lloyd Harris (Slovenia) Grega Žemlja	(Japan) Yūichi Sugita (Japan) Yosuke Watanuki (Russia) Evgeny Karlovskiy (Chinese Taipei) Chen Ti
February 20	Shimadzu All Japan Indoor Tennis Championships; Kyoto, Japan; Carpet (i) – $50,000+H – 32S/32Q/16D; Singles – Doubles	(Thailand) Sanchai Ratiwatana (Thailand) Sonchat Ratiwatana; 4–6, 6–4, [10–7]	(Belgium) Ruben Bemelmans (Belgium) Joris De Loore	(South Africa) Lloyd Harris (Slovenia) Grega Žemlja	(Japan) Yūichi Sugita (Japan) Yosuke Watanuki (Russia) Evgeny Karlovskiy (Chinese Taipei) Chen Ti
February 27	Wrocław Open; Wrocław, Poland; Hard (i) – €85,000+H – 32S/32Q/16D; Singles – Doubles	(Austria) Jürgen Melzer; 6–4, 6–3	(Poland) Michał Przysiężny	(France) Paul-Henri Mathieu (France) Quentin Halys	(France) Jonathan Eysseric (France) Kenny de Schepper (Czech Republic) Petr Michnev (Bosnia and Herzegovina) Mirza Bašić
February 27	Wrocław Open; Wrocław, Poland; Hard (i) – €85,000+H – 32S/32Q/16D; Singles – Doubles	(Canada) Adil Shamasdin (Belarus) Andrei Vasilevski; 6–3, 3–6, [21–19]	(Russia) Mikhail Elgin (Ukraine) Denys Molchanov	(France) Paul-Henri Mathieu (France) Quentin Halys	(France) Jonathan Eysseric (France) Kenny de Schepper (Czech Republic) Petr Michnev (Bosnia and Herzegovina) Mirza Bašić
February 27	Keio Challenger; Yokohama, Japan; Hard – $50,000+H – 32S/32Q/16D; Singles – Doubles	(Japan) Yūichi Sugita; 6–4, 2–6, 7–6^{(7–2)}	(South Korea) Kwon Soon-woo	(Australia) Blake Mott (Japan) Tatsuma Ito	(China) Zhang Ze (United Kingdom) Brydan Klein (Japan) Kaito Uesugi (Australia) Andrew Whittington
February 27	Keio Challenger; Yokohama, Japan; Hard – $50,000+H – 32S/32Q/16D; Singles – Doubles	(Croatia) Marin Draganja (Croatia) Tomislav Draganja; 4–6, 6–3, [10–4]	(Belgium) Joris De Loore (Australia) Luke Saville	(Australia) Blake Mott (Japan) Tatsuma Ito	(China) Zhang Ze (United Kingdom) Brydan Klein (Japan) Kaito Uesugi (Australia) Andrew Whittington

=== March ===
Week of	Tournament	Champions	Runners-up	Semifinalists	Quarterfinalists
March 6	Challenger ATP Cachantún Cup; Santiago, Chile; Clay – $50,000+H – 32S/32Q/16D; Singles – Doubles	(Brazil) Rogério Dutra Silva; 7–5, 6–3	(Chile) Nicolás Jarry	(Italy) Simone Bolelli (Brazil) Guilherme Clezar	(Sweden) Christian Lindell (Japan) Taro Daniel (Brazil) João Souza (Argentina) Guido Andreozzi
March 6	Challenger ATP Cachantún Cup; Santiago, Chile; Clay – $50,000+H – 32S/32Q/16D; Singles – Doubles	(Chile) Marcelo Tomás Barrios Vera (Chile) Nicolás Jarry; 6–4, 6–3	(Argentina) Máximo González (Argentina) Andrés Molteni	(Italy) Simone Bolelli (Brazil) Guilherme Clezar	(Sweden) Christian Lindell (Japan) Taro Daniel (Brazil) João Souza (Argentina) Guido Andreozzi
March 6	Zhuhai Open; Zhuhai, China; Hard – $50,000+H – 32S/32Q/16D; Singles – Doubles	(Russia) Evgeny Donskoy; 6–3, 6–4	(Italy) Thomas Fabbiano	(India) Yuki Bhambri (Belarus) Uladzimir Ignatik	(Belgium) Joris De Loore (Argentina) Agustín Velotti (Italy) Luca Vanni (China) Zhang Ze
March 6	Zhuhai Open; Zhuhai, China; Hard – $50,000+H – 32S/32Q/16D; Singles – Doubles	(China) Gong Maoxin (China) Zhang Ze; 6–3, 7–6^{(7–4)}	(South Africa) Ruan Roelofse (Chinese Taipei) Yi Chu-huan	(India) Yuki Bhambri (Belarus) Uladzimir Ignatik	(Belgium) Joris De Loore (Argentina) Agustín Velotti (Italy) Luca Vanni (China) Zhang Ze
March 13	Irving Tennis Classic; Irving, United States; Hard – $150,000+H – 32S/32Q/16D; Singles – Doubles	(United Kingdom) Aljaž Bedene; 6–4, 3–6, 6–1	(Kazakhstan) Mikhail Kukushkin	(Germany) Dustin Brown (Russia) Andrey Rublev	(United States) Tim Smyczek (Russia) Karen Khachanov (France) Jérémy Chardy (United States) Jared Donaldson
March 13	Irving Tennis Classic; Irving, United States; Hard – $150,000+H – 32S/32Q/16D; Singles – Doubles	(New Zealand) Marcus Daniell (Brazil) Marcelo Demoliner; 6–3, 6–4	(Austria) Oliver Marach (France) Fabrice Martin	(Germany) Dustin Brown (Russia) Andrey Rublev	(United States) Tim Smyczek (Russia) Karen Khachanov (France) Jérémy Chardy (United States) Jared Donaldson
March 13	Challenger Banque Nationale de Drummondville; Drummondville, Canada; Hard (i) – $75,000 – 32S/32Q/16D; Singles – Doubles	(Canada) Denis Shapovalov; 6–3, 6–2	(Belgium) Ruben Bemelmans	(Australia) John-Patrick Smith (Canada) Félix Auger-Aliassime	(Germany) Tim Pütz (France) Gleb Sakharov (Slovenia) Blaž Rola (Australia) Alex de Minaur
March 13	Challenger Banque Nationale de Drummondville; Drummondville, Canada; Hard (i) – $75,000 – 32S/32Q/16D; Singles – Doubles	(Australia) Sam Groth (Canada) Adil Shamasdin; 6–3, 2–6, [10–8]	(Australia) Matt Reid (Australia) John-Patrick Smith	(Australia) John-Patrick Smith (Canada) Félix Auger-Aliassime	(Germany) Tim Pütz (France) Gleb Sakharov (Slovenia) Blaž Rola (Australia) Alex de Minaur
March 13	Pingshan Open; Shenzhen, China; Hard – $75,000+H – 32S/32Q/16D; Singles – Doubles	(Japan) Yūichi Sugita; 7–6^{(8–6)}, 6–4	(Slovenia) Blaž Kavčič	(Italy) Luca Vanni (India) Yuki Bhambri	(Russia) Evgeny Donskoy (South Korea) Lee Duck-hee (Germany) Maximilian Marterer (Italy) Thomas Fabbiano
March 13	Pingshan Open; Shenzhen, China; Hard – $75,000+H – 32S/32Q/16D; Singles – Doubles	(Thailand) Sanchai Ratiwatana (Thailand) Sonchat Ratiwatana; 6–2, 6–7^{(5–7)}, [10–6]	(Chinese Taipei) Hsieh Cheng-peng (Indonesia) Christopher Rungkat	(Italy) Luca Vanni (India) Yuki Bhambri	(Russia) Evgeny Donskoy (South Korea) Lee Duck-hee (Germany) Maximilian Marterer (Italy) Thomas Fabbiano
March 13	Copa Ciudad de Tigre; Buenos Aires, Argentina; Hard – $50,000+H – 32S/32Q/16D; Singles – Doubles	(Japan) Taro Daniel; 5–7, 6–3, 6–4	(Argentina) Leonardo Mayer	(France) Tristan Lamasine (Spain) Rubén Ramírez Hidalgo	(Argentina) Carlos Berlocq (Argentina) Tomás Lipovšek Puches (Brazil) João Souza (Brazil) Rogério Dutra Silva
March 13	Copa Ciudad de Tigre; Buenos Aires, Argentina; Hard – $50,000+H – 32S/32Q/16D; Singles – Doubles	(Argentina) Máximo González (Argentina) Andrés Molteni; 6–1, 6–7^{(6–8)}, [10–5]	(Argentina) Guido Andreozzi (Argentina) Guillermo Durán	(France) Tristan Lamasine (Spain) Rubén Ramírez Hidalgo	(Argentina) Carlos Berlocq (Argentina) Tomás Lipovšek Puches (Brazil) João Souza (Brazil) Rogério Dutra Silva
March 20	Jalisco Open; Guadalajara, Mexico; Hard – $50,000+H – 32S/32Q/16D; Singles – Doubles	(Bosnia and Herzegovina) Mirza Bašić; 6–4, 6–4	(Canada) Denis Shapovalov	(Chinese Taipei) Jason Jung (Poland) Jerzy Janowicz	(Dominican Republic) Víctor Estrella Burgos (United States) Mitchell Krueger (United States) Tennys Sandgren (United Kingdom) Lloyd Glasspool
March 20	Jalisco Open; Guadalajara, Mexico; Hard – $50,000+H – 32S/32Q/16D; Singles – Doubles	(Mexico) Santiago González (New Zealand) Artem Sitak; 6–3, 1–6, [10–5]	(Australia) Luke Saville (Australia) John-Patrick Smith	(Chinese Taipei) Jason Jung (Poland) Jerzy Janowicz	(Dominican Republic) Víctor Estrella Burgos (United States) Mitchell Krueger (United States) Tennys Sandgren (United Kingdom) Lloyd Glasspool
March 20	International Challenger Quanzhou; Quanzhou, China; Hard – $50,000+H – 32S/32Q/16D; Singles – Doubles	(Italy) Thomas Fabbiano; 7–6^{(7–5)}, 7–6^{(9–7)}	(Italy) Matteo Berrettini	(Belarus) Ilya Ivashka (Germany) Maximilian Marterer	(Belarus) Uladzimir Ignatik (Canada) Steven Diez (India) Yuki Bhambri (South Korea) Lee Duck-hee
March 20	International Challenger Quanzhou; Quanzhou, China; Hard – $50,000+H – 32S/32Q/16D; Singles – Doubles	(Chinese Taipei) Hsieh Cheng-peng (Chinese Taipei) Peng Hsien-yin; 3–6, 6–4, [10–7]	(Germany) Andre Begemann (Belarus) Aliaksandr Bury	(Belarus) Ilya Ivashka (Germany) Maximilian Marterer	(Belarus) Uladzimir Ignatik (Canada) Steven Diez (India) Yuki Bhambri (South Korea) Lee Duck-hee
March 27	Torneo Internacional Challenger León; León, Mexico; Hard – $75,000+H – 32S/32Q/16D; Singles – Doubles	(Spain) Adrián Menéndez Maceiras; 6–4, 3–6, 6–3	(Ecuador) Roberto Quiroz	(United States) Rajeev Ram (Chile) Nicolás Jarry	(Dominican Republic) Víctor Estrella Burgos (Bosnia and Herzegovina) Mirza Bašić (Canada) Vasek Pospisil (Russia) Teymuraz Gabashvili
March 27	Torneo Internacional Challenger León; León, Mexico; Hard – $75,000+H – 32S/32Q/16D; Singles – Doubles	(India) Leander Paes (Canada) Adil Shamasdin; 6–1, 6–4	(Switzerland) Luca Margaroli (Brazil) Caio Zampieri	(United States) Rajeev Ram (Chile) Nicolás Jarry	(Dominican Republic) Víctor Estrella Burgos (Bosnia and Herzegovina) Mirza Bašić (Canada) Vasek Pospisil (Russia) Teymuraz Gabashvili
March 27	Open Harmonie mutuelle Saint-Brieuc, France; Hard (i) – €43,000+H – 32S/32Q/16D; Singles – Doubles	(Belarus) Egor Gerasimov; 7–6^{(7–3)}, 7–6^{(7–5)}	(Germany) Tobias Kamke	(France) Corentin Moutet (France) Gleb Sakharov	(Switzerland) Marco Chiudinelli (Republic of Ireland) James McGee (Slovakia) Lukáš Lacko (Ukraine) Sergiy Stakhovsky
March 27	Open Harmonie mutuelle Saint-Brieuc, France; Hard (i) – €43,000+H – 32S/32Q/16D; Singles – Doubles	(Germany) Andre Begemann (Denmark) Frederik Nielsen; 6–3, 6–4	(Republic of Ireland) David O'Hare (United Kingdom) Joe Salisbury	(France) Corentin Moutet (France) Gleb Sakharov	(Switzerland) Marco Chiudinelli (Republic of Ireland) James McGee (Slovakia) Lukáš Lacko (Ukraine) Sergiy Stakhovsky

=== April ===
Week of	Tournament	Champions	Runners-up	Semifinalists	Quarterfinalists
April 3	Visit Panamá Cup; Panama City, Panama; Clay – $50,000+H – 32S/32Q/16D; Singles – Doubles	(Brazil) Rogério Dutra Silva; 6–2, 6–4	(Serbia) Peđa Krstin	(Switzerland) Henri Laaksonen (Dominican Republic) Víctor Estrella Burgos	(Argentina) Horacio Zeballos (Argentina) Federico Coria (United States) Bjorn Fratangelo (Slovenia) Blaž Rola
April 3	Visit Panamá Cup; Panama City, Panama; Clay – $50,000+H – 32S/32Q/16D; Singles – Doubles	(Peru) Sergio Galdós (Brazil) Caio Zampieri; 1–6, 7–6^{(7–5)}, [10–7]	(Germany) Kevin Krawietz (Spain) Adrián Menéndez Maceiras	(Switzerland) Henri Laaksonen (Dominican Republic) Víctor Estrella Burgos	(Argentina) Horacio Zeballos (Argentina) Federico Coria (United States) Bjorn Fratangelo (Slovenia) Blaž Rola
April 3	Verrazzano Open; Sophia Antipolis, France; Clay – €64,000+H – 32S/32Q/16D; Singles – Doubles	(United Kingdom) Aljaž Bedene; 6–2, 6–2	(France) Benoît Paire	(Slovakia) Jozef Kovalík (Italy) Marco Cecchinato	(Hungary) Márton Fucsovics (Spain) Guillermo García López (France) Mathias Bourgue (Belgium) Arthur De Greef
April 3	Verrazzano Open; Sophia Antipolis, France; Clay – €64,000+H – 32S/32Q/16D; Singles – Doubles	(France) Tristan Lamasine (Croatia) Franko Škugor; 6–2, 6–2	(Belarus) Uladzimir Ignatik (Slovakia) Jozef Kovalík	(Slovakia) Jozef Kovalík (Italy) Marco Cecchinato	(Hungary) Márton Fucsovics (Spain) Guillermo García López (France) Mathias Bourgue (Belgium) Arthur De Greef
April 10	Open Città Della Disfida; Barletta, Italy; Clay – €43,000+H – 32S/32Q/16D; Singles – Doubles	(United Kingdom) Aljaž Bedene; 7–6^{(7–4)}, 6–3	(Portugal) Gastão Elias	(Italy) Lorenzo Giustino (Czech Republic) Lukáš Rosol	(Belgium) Kimmer Coppejans (Germany) Maximilian Marterer (Italy) Alessandro Giannessi (Italy) Marco Cecchinato
April 10	Open Città Della Disfida; Barletta, Italy; Clay – €43,000+H – 32S/32Q/16D; Singles – Doubles	(Italy) Marco Cecchinato (Italy) Matteo Donati; 6–3, 6–4	(Croatia) Marin Draganja (Croatia) Tomislav Draganja	(Italy) Lorenzo Giustino (Czech Republic) Lukáš Rosol	(Belgium) Kimmer Coppejans (Germany) Maximilian Marterer (Italy) Alessandro Giannessi (Italy) Marco Cecchinato
April 10	San Luis Open Challenger Tour; San Luis Potosí, Mexico; Clay – $50,000+H – 32S/32Q/15D; Singles – Doubles	(Slovakia) Andrej Martin; 7–5, 6–4	(Spain) Adrián Menéndez Maceiras	(Italy) Andrea Arnaboldi (Serbia) Miomir Kecmanović	(Argentina) Facundo Bagnis (Ecuador) Roberto Quiroz (El Salvador) Marcelo Arévalo (Austria) Gerald Melzer
April 10	San Luis Open Challenger Tour; San Luis Potosí, Mexico; Clay – $50,000+H – 32S/32Q/15D; Singles – Doubles	(Ecuador) Roberto Quiroz (Brazil) Caio Zampieri; 6–4, 6–2	(Mexico) Hans Hach Verdugo (Spain) Adrián Menéndez Maceiras	(Italy) Andrea Arnaboldi (Serbia) Miomir Kecmanović	(Argentina) Facundo Bagnis (Ecuador) Roberto Quiroz (El Salvador) Marcelo Arévalo (Austria) Gerald Melzer
April 17	Santaizi ATP Challenger; Taipei, Taiwan; Carpet (i) – $125,000+H – 32S/32Q/16D; Singles – Doubles	(Chinese Taipei) Lu Yen-hsun; 6–1, 7–6^{(7–4)}	(Japan) Tatsuma Ito	(Japan) Akira Santillan (Canada) Vasek Pospisil	(Australia) Matthew Ebden (Russia) Konstantin Kravchuk (Switzerland) Marco Chiudinelli (Japan) Go Soeda
April 17	Santaizi ATP Challenger; Taipei, Taiwan; Carpet (i) – $125,000+H – 32S/32Q/16D; Singles – Doubles	(Switzerland) Marco Chiudinelli (Croatia) Franko Škugor; 4–6, 6–2, [10–5]	(Thailand) Sanchai Ratiwatana (Thailand) Sonchat Ratiwatana	(Japan) Akira Santillan (Canada) Vasek Pospisil	(Australia) Matthew Ebden (Russia) Konstantin Kravchuk (Switzerland) Marco Chiudinelli (Japan) Go Soeda
April 17	ZS-Sports China International Challenger; Qingdao, China; Clay – $125,000 – 32S/32Q/16D; Singles – Doubles	(Serbia) Janko Tipsarević; 6–3, 7–6^{(11–9)}	(Germany) Oscar Otte	(France) Quentin Halys (France) Mathias Bourgue	(Australia) Jordan Thompson (China) Wu Di (Belgium) Kimmer Coppejans (Slovakia) Andrej Martin
April 17	ZS-Sports China International Challenger; Qingdao, China; Clay – $125,000 – 32S/32Q/16D; Singles – Doubles	(Germany) Gero Kretschmer (Germany) Alexander Satschko; 2–6, 7–6^{(8–6)}, [10–3]	(Germany) Andreas Mies (Germany) Oscar Otte	(France) Quentin Halys (France) Mathias Bourgue	(Australia) Jordan Thompson (China) Wu Di (Belgium) Kimmer Coppejans (Slovakia) Andrej Martin
April 17	Sarasota Open; Sarasota, United States; Clay – $100,000 – 32S/32Q/16D; Singles – Doubles	(United States) Frances Tiafoe; 6–3, 6–4	(United States) Tennys Sandgren	(France) Vincent Millot (Austria) Jürgen Melzer	(United States) Jared Donaldson (United States) Denis Kudla (Switzerland) Henri Laaksonen (Argentina) Horacio Zeballos
April 17	Sarasota Open; Sarasota, United States; Clay – $100,000 – 32S/32Q/16D; Singles – Doubles	(United States) Scott Lipsky (Austria) Jürgen Melzer; 6–2, 6–4	(United States) Stefan Kozlov (Canada) Peter Polansky	(France) Vincent Millot (Austria) Jürgen Melzer	(United States) Jared Donaldson (United States) Denis Kudla (Switzerland) Henri Laaksonen (Argentina) Horacio Zeballos
April 24	Kunming Open; Anning, China; Clay – $150,000+H – 32S/32Q/16D; Singles – Doubles	(Serbia) Janko Tipsarević; 6–7^{(5–7)}, 6–3, 6–4	(France) Quentin Halys	(Germany) Oscar Otte (Argentina) Juan Pablo Paz	(Australia) Jordan Thompson (Slovakia) Andrej Martin (China) Wu Di (Slovenia) Blaž Kavčič
April 24	Kunming Open; Anning, China; Clay – $150,000+H – 32S/32Q/16D; Singles – Doubles	(Croatia) Dino Marcan (Austria) Tristan-Samuel Weissborn; 5–7, 6–3, [10–7]	(Australia) Steven de Waard (Slovenia) Blaž Kavčič	(Germany) Oscar Otte (Argentina) Juan Pablo Paz	(Australia) Jordan Thompson (Slovakia) Andrej Martin (China) Wu Di (Slovenia) Blaž Kavčič
April 24	Tallahassee Tennis Challenger; Tallahassee, United States; Clay – $75,000 – 32S/32Q/16D; Singles – Doubles	(Slovenia) Blaž Rola; 6–2, 6–7^{(6–8)}, 7–5	(India) Ramkumar Ramanathan	(Italy) Andrea Arnaboldi (United States) Mitchell Krueger	(United States) Bradley Klahn (Argentina) Guido Andreozzi (United States) Stefan Kozlov (United States) Dennis Novikov
April 24	Tallahassee Tennis Challenger; Tallahassee, United States; Clay – $75,000 – 32S/32Q/16D; Singles – Doubles	(United States) Scott Lipsky (India) Leander Paes; 4–6, 7–6^{(7–5)}, [10–7]	(Argentina) Máximo González (Argentina) Leonardo Mayer	(Italy) Andrea Arnaboldi (United States) Mitchell Krueger	(United States) Bradley Klahn (Argentina) Guido Andreozzi (United States) Stefan Kozlov (United States) Dennis Novikov
April 24	Internazionali di Tennis d'Abruzzo; Francavilla al Mare, Italy; Clay – €43,000+H – 32S/32Q/16D; Singles – Doubles	(Portugal) Pedro Sousa; 6–3, 7–6^{(7–3)}	(Italy) Alessandro Giannessi	(Italy) Marco Cecchinato (Italy) Stefano Travaglia	(Italy) Matteo Donati (Italy) Matteo Berrettini (Czech Republic) Václav Šafránek (Spain) Rubén Ramírez Hidalgo
April 24	Internazionali di Tennis d'Abruzzo; Francavilla al Mare, Italy; Clay – €43,000+H – 32S/32Q/16D; Singles – Doubles	(Austria) Julian Knowle (Slovakia) Igor Zelenay; 2–6, 6–2, [10–7]	(Australia) Rameez Junaid (Germany) Kevin Krawietz	(Italy) Marco Cecchinato (Italy) Stefano Travaglia	(Italy) Matteo Donati (Italy) Matteo Berrettini (Czech Republic) Václav Šafránek (Spain) Rubén Ramírez Hidalgo

=== May ===
Week of	Tournament	Champions	Runners-up	Semifinalists	Quarterfinalists
May 1	Prosperita Open; Ostrava, Czech Republic; Clay – €64,000+H – 32S/32Q/16D; Singles – Doubles	(Italy) Stefano Travaglia; 6–2, 3–6, 6–4	(Italy) Marco Cecchinato	(Hungary) Attila Balázs (Czech Republic) Adam Pavlásek	(Argentina) Marco Trungelliti (Italy) Simone Bolelli (Spain) Roberto Carballés Baena (Italy) Stefano Napolitano
May 1	Prosperita Open; Ostrava, Czech Republic; Clay – €64,000+H – 32S/32Q/16D; Singles – Doubles	(India) Jeevan Nedunchezhiyan (Croatia) Franko Škugor; 6–3, 6–2	(Australia) Rameez Junaid (Czech Republic) Lukáš Rosol	(Hungary) Attila Balázs (Czech Republic) Adam Pavlásek	(Argentina) Marco Trungelliti (Italy) Simone Bolelli (Spain) Roberto Carballés Baena (Italy) Stefano Napolitano
May 1	Savannah Challenger; Savannah, United States; Clay – $75,000 – 32S/32Q/16D; Singles – Doubles	(United States) Tennys Sandgren; 6–4, 6–3	(Brazil) João Pedro Sorgi	(Republic of Ireland) James McGee (United States) Tommy Paul	(United States) Marcos Giron (United States) Stefan Kozlov (United States) Dennis Novikov (Switzerland) Henri Laaksonen
May 1	Savannah Challenger; Savannah, United States; Clay – $75,000 – 32S/32Q/16D; Singles – Doubles	(Canada) Peter Polansky (United Kingdom) Neal Skupski; 4–6, 6–3, [10–1]	(United Kingdom) Luke Bambridge (United States) Mitchell Krueger	(Republic of Ireland) James McGee (United States) Tommy Paul	(United States) Marcos Giron (United States) Stefan Kozlov (United States) Dennis Novikov (Switzerland) Henri Laaksonen
May 1	Gimcheon Open ATP Challenger; Gimcheon, South Korea; Hard – $50,000+H – 32S/32Q/16D; Singles – Doubles	(Italy) Thomas Fabbiano; 7–5, 6–1	(Russia) Teymuraz Gabashvili	(Slovenia) Blaž Kavčič (Russia) Konstantin Kravchuk	(Switzerland) Marco Chiudinelli (Japan) Akira Santillan (Canada) Vasek Pospisil (United Kingdom) Liam Broady
May 1	Gimcheon Open ATP Challenger; Gimcheon, South Korea; Hard – $50,000+H – 32S/32Q/16D; Singles – Doubles	(Switzerland) Marco Chiudinelli (Russia) Teymuraz Gabashvili; 6–1, 6–3	(South Africa) Ruan Roelofse (Chinese Taipei) Yi Chu-huan	(Slovenia) Blaž Kavčič (Russia) Konstantin Kravchuk	(Switzerland) Marco Chiudinelli (Japan) Akira Santillan (Canada) Vasek Pospisil (United Kingdom) Liam Broady
May 8	Open du Pays d'Aix; Aix-en-Provence, France; Clay – €127,000+H – 32S/32Q/16D; Singles – Doubles	(United States) Frances Tiafoe; 6–3, 4–6, 7–6^{(7–5)}	(France) Jérémy Chardy	(United States) Reilly Opelka (Portugal) Pedro Sousa	(Tunisia) Malek Jaziri (France) Quentin Halys (United States) Bjorn Fratangelo (France) Julien Benneteau
May 8	Open du Pays d'Aix; Aix-en-Provence, France; Clay – €127,000+H – 32S/32Q/16D; Singles – Doubles	(Netherlands) Wesley Koolhof (Netherlands) Matwé Middelkoop; 2–6, 6–4, [16–14]	(Germany) Andre Begemann (France) Jérémy Chardy	(United States) Reilly Opelka (Portugal) Pedro Sousa	(Tunisia) Malek Jaziri (France) Quentin Halys (United States) Bjorn Fratangelo (France) Julien Benneteau
May 8	Seoul Open Challenger; Seoul, South Korea; Hard – $100,000+H – 32S/32Q/16D; Singles – Doubles	(Italy) Thomas Fabbiano; 1–6, 6–4, 6–3	(South Korea) Kwon Soon-woo	(Belgium) Ruben Bemelmans (South Korea) Lee Duck-hee	(Japan) Hiroki Moriya (Japan) Go Soeda (Israel) Dudi Sela (United States) Alexander Sarkissian
May 8	Seoul Open Challenger; Seoul, South Korea; Hard – $100,000+H – 32S/32Q/16D; Singles – Doubles	(Chinese Taipei) Hsieh Cheng-peng (Chinese Taipei) Peng Hsien-yin; 5–1 ret.	(Italy) Thomas Fabbiano (Israel) Dudi Sela	(Belgium) Ruben Bemelmans (South Korea) Lee Duck-hee	(Japan) Hiroki Moriya (Japan) Go Soeda (Israel) Dudi Sela (United States) Alexander Sarkissian
May 8	Karshi Challenger; Qarshi, Uzbekistan; Hard – $75,000+H – 32S/32Q/16D; Singles – Doubles	(Belarus) Egor Gerasimov; 6–3, 7–6^{(7–4)}	(Turkey) Cem İlkel	(India) Yuki Bhambri (Kazakhstan) Dmitry Popko	(Ukraine) Sergiy Stakhovsky (Belarus) Yaraslav Shyla (Kazakhstan) Aleksandr Nedovyesov (Russia) Alexander Kudryavtsev
May 8	Karshi Challenger; Qarshi, Uzbekistan; Hard – $75,000+H – 32S/32Q/16D; Singles – Doubles	(Ukraine) Denys Molchanov (Ukraine) Sergiy Stakhovsky; 6–4, 7–6^{(9–7)}	(Germany) Kevin Krawietz (Spain) Adrián Menéndez Maceiras	(India) Yuki Bhambri (Kazakhstan) Dmitry Popko	(Ukraine) Sergiy Stakhovsky (Belarus) Yaraslav Shyla (Kazakhstan) Aleksandr Nedovyesov (Russia) Alexander Kudryavtsev
May 8	Garden Open; Rome, Italy; Clay – €64,000+H – 32S/32Q/16D; Singles – Doubles	(Italy) Marco Cecchinato; 6–4, 6–4	(Slovakia) Jozef Kovalík	(Belgium) Kimmer Coppejans (Germany) Yannick Maden	(Greece) Stefanos Tsitsipas (Italy) Riccardo Bellotti (Italy) Stefano Travaglia (Italy) Gianluigi Quinzi
May 8	Garden Open; Rome, Italy; Clay – €64,000+H – 32S/32Q/16D; Singles – Doubles	(Germany) Andreas Mies (Germany) Oscar Otte; 4–6, 7–6^{(14–12)}, [10–8]	(Belgium) Kimmer Coppejans (Hungary) Márton Fucsovics	(Belgium) Kimmer Coppejans (Germany) Yannick Maden	(Greece) Stefanos Tsitsipas (Italy) Riccardo Bellotti (Italy) Stefano Travaglia (Italy) Gianluigi Quinzi
May 15	Busan Open; Busan, South Korea; Hard – $150,000+H – 32S/32Q/16D; Singles – Doubles	(Canada) Vasek Pospisil; 6–1, 6–2	(Japan) Go Soeda	(South Korea) Kwon Soon-woo (Israel) Dudi Sela	(Chinese Taipei) Lu Yen-hsun (Australia) Matthew Ebden (United States) Austin Krajicek (Japan) Tatsuma Ito
May 15	Busan Open; Busan, South Korea; Hard – $150,000+H – 32S/32Q/16D; Singles – Doubles	(Chinese Taipei) Hsieh Cheng-peng (Chinese Taipei) Peng Hsien-yin; 7–5, 4–6, [10–8]	(Thailand) Sanchai Ratiwatana (Thailand) Sonchat Ratiwatana	(South Korea) Kwon Soon-woo (Israel) Dudi Sela	(Chinese Taipei) Lu Yen-hsun (Australia) Matthew Ebden (United States) Austin Krajicek (Japan) Tatsuma Ito
May 15	BNP Paribas Primrose Bordeaux; Bordeaux, France; Clay – €106,000+H – 32S/32Q/16D; Singles – Doubles	(Belgium) Steve Darcis; 7–6^{(7–2)}, 4–6, 7–5	(Brazil) Rogério Dutra Silva	(Belgium) Arthur De Greef (France) Benjamin Bonzi	(France) Maxime Janvier (United States) Bjorn Fratangelo (France) Julien Benneteau (Serbia) Dušan Lajović
May 15	BNP Paribas Primrose Bordeaux; Bordeaux, France; Clay – €106,000+H – 32S/32Q/16D; Singles – Doubles	(India) Purav Raja (India) Divij Sharan; 6–4, 6–4	(Mexico) Santiago González (New Zealand) Artem Sitak	(Belgium) Arthur De Greef (France) Benjamin Bonzi	(France) Maxime Janvier (United States) Bjorn Fratangelo (France) Julien Benneteau (Serbia) Dušan Lajović
May 15	Heilbronner Neckarcup; Heilbronn, Germany; Clay – €64,000+H – 32S/32Q/16D; Singles – Doubles	(Serbia) Filip Krajinović; 6–3, 6–2	(Slovakia) Norbert Gombos	(Italy) Lorenzo Giustino (Argentina) Guido Pella	(Slovakia) Andrej Martin (Norway) Casper Ruud (Hungary) Márton Fucsovics (Italy) Marco Cecchinato
May 15	Heilbronner Neckarcup; Heilbronn, Germany; Clay – €64,000+H – 32S/32Q/16D; Singles – Doubles	(Czech Republic) Roman Jebavý (Croatia) Antonio Šančić; 6–4, 6–1	(Canada) Adil Shamasdin (Slovakia) Igor Zelenay	(Italy) Lorenzo Giustino (Argentina) Guido Pella	(Slovakia) Andrej Martin (Norway) Casper Ruud (Hungary) Márton Fucsovics (Italy) Marco Cecchinato
May 15	Samarkand Challenger; Samarkand, Uzbekistan; Clay – $75,000+H – 32S/32Q/16D; Singles – Doubles	(Spain) Adrián Menéndez Maceiras; 6–4, 6–2	(Bosnia and Herzegovina) Aldin Šetkić	(Chinese Taipei) Jason Jung (Belarus) Ilya Ivashka	(Belarus) Egor Gerasimov (Russia) Alexey Vatutin (Serbia) Nikola Milojević (Russia) Teymuraz Gabashvili
May 15	Samarkand Challenger; Samarkand, Uzbekistan; Clay – $75,000+H – 32S/32Q/16D; Singles – Doubles	(Lithuania) Laurynas Grigelis (Czech Republic) Zdeněk Kolář; 7–6^{(7–2)}, 6–3	(India) Prajnesh Gunneswaran (India) Vishnu Vardhan	(Chinese Taipei) Jason Jung (Belarus) Ilya Ivashka	(Belarus) Egor Gerasimov (Russia) Alexey Vatutin (Serbia) Nikola Milojević (Russia) Teymuraz Gabashvili
May 22	Venice Challenge Save Cup; Mestre, Italy; Clay – €43,000+H – 32S/32Q/16D; Singles – Doubles	(Portugal) João Domingues; 7–6^{(7–4)}, 6–4	(Austria) Sebastian Ofner	(Czech Republic) Zdeněk Kolář (Australia) Blake Mott	(Italy) Julian Ocleppo (France) Axel Michon (Italy) Gianluigi Quinzi (Italy) Matteo Viola
May 22	Venice Challenge Save Cup; Mestre, Italy; Clay – €43,000+H – 32S/32Q/16D; Singles – Doubles	(United Kingdom) Ken Skupski (United Kingdom) Neal Skupski; 5–7, 6–4, [10–5]	(Austria) Julian Knowle (Slovakia) Igor Zelenay	(Czech Republic) Zdeněk Kolář (Australia) Blake Mott	(Italy) Julian Ocleppo (France) Axel Michon (Italy) Gianluigi Quinzi (Italy) Matteo Viola
May 22	Shymkent Challenger; Shymkent, Kazakhstan; Clay – $50,000+H – 32S/32Q/16D; Singles – Doubles	(Lithuania) Ričardas Berankis; 6–3, 6–2	(Germany) Yannick Hanfmann	(Kazakhstan) Aleksandr Nedovyesov (Spain) Carlos Taberner	(Belgium) Clément Geens (Russia) Evgenii Tiurnev (Serbia) Danilo Petrović (Kazakhstan) Andrey Golubev
May 22	Shymkent Challenger; Shymkent, Kazakhstan; Clay – $50,000+H – 32S/32Q/16D; Singles – Doubles	(Chile) Hans Podlipnik Castillo (Belarus) Andrei Vasilevski; 6–4, 6–2	(Belgium) Clément Geens (Argentina) Juan Pablo Paz	(Kazakhstan) Aleksandr Nedovyesov (Spain) Carlos Taberner	(Belgium) Clément Geens (Russia) Evgenii Tiurnev (Serbia) Danilo Petrović (Kazakhstan) Andrey Golubev
May 29	Internazionali di Tennis Città di Vicenza; Vicenza, Italy; Clay – €43,000+H – 32S/32Q/16D; Singles – Doubles	(Hungary) Márton Fucsovics; 4–6, 7–6^{(9–7)}, 6–2	(Serbia) Laslo Đere	(Czech Republic) Jan Šátral (Italy) Lorenzo Giustino	(Italy) Matteo Berrettini (Italy) Matteo Donati (Spain) Daniel Muñoz de la Nava (Serbia) Filip Krajinović
May 29	Internazionali di Tennis Città di Vicenza; Vicenza, Italy; Clay – €43,000+H – 32S/32Q/16D; Singles – Doubles	(Germany) Gero Kretschmer (Germany) Alexander Satschko; 6–4, 7–6^{(7–4)}	(United States) Sekou Bangoura (Austria) Tristan-Samuel Weissborn	(Czech Republic) Jan Šátral (Italy) Lorenzo Giustino	(Italy) Matteo Berrettini (Italy) Matteo Donati (Spain) Daniel Muñoz de la Nava (Serbia) Filip Krajinović

=== June ===
Week of	Tournament	Champions	Runners-up	Semifinalists	Quarterfinalists
June 5	UniCredit Czech Open; Prostějov, Czech Republic; Clay – €127,000+H – 32S/32Q/16D; Singles – Doubles	(Czech Republic) Jiří Veselý; 5–7, 6–1, 7–5	(Argentina) Federico Delbonis	(Sweden) Markus Eriksson (United States) Tennys Sandgren	(Moldova) Radu Albot (Spain) Tommy Robredo (Argentina) Nicolás Kicker (Belarus) Uladzimir Ignatik
June 5	UniCredit Czech Open; Prostějov, Czech Republic; Clay – €127,000+H – 32S/32Q/16D; Singles – Doubles	(Argentina) Guillermo Durán (Argentina) Andrés Molteni; 7–6^{(7–5)}, 6–7^{(5–7)}, [10–6]	(Czech Republic) Roman Jebavý (Chile) Hans Podlipnik Castillo	(Sweden) Markus Eriksson (United States) Tennys Sandgren	(Moldova) Radu Albot (Spain) Tommy Robredo (Argentina) Nicolás Kicker (Belarus) Uladzimir Ignatik
June 5	Aegon Surbiton Trophy; Surbiton, United Kingdom; Grass – €127,000 – 32S/32Q/16D; Singles – Doubles	(Japan) Yūichi Sugita; 7–6^{(9–7)}, 7–6^{(10–8)}	(Australia) Jordan Thompson	(Germany) Dustin Brown (Romania) Marius Copil	(United Kingdom) Dan Evans (United States) Reilly Opelka (Ukraine) Sergiy Stakhovsky (Israel) Dudi Sela
June 5	Aegon Surbiton Trophy; Surbiton, United Kingdom; Grass – €127,000 – 32S/32Q/16D; Singles – Doubles	(New Zealand) Marcus Daniell (Pakistan) Aisam-ul-Haq Qureshi; 6–3, 7–6^{(7–0)}	(Philippines) Treat Huey (United States) Denis Kudla	(Germany) Dustin Brown (Romania) Marius Copil	(United Kingdom) Dan Evans (United States) Reilly Opelka (Ukraine) Sergiy Stakhovsky (Israel) Dudi Sela
June 12	Aegon Open Nottingham; Nottingham, United Kingdom; Grass – €127,000+H – 32S/32Q/16D; Singles – Doubles	(Israel) Dudi Sela; 4–6, 6–4, 6–3	(Italy) Thomas Fabbiano	(Australia) Sam Groth (Romania) Marius Copil	(Australia) John-Patrick Smith (Ukraine) Sergiy Stakhovsky (United Kingdom) Lloyd Glasspool (United States) Bjorn Fratangelo
June 12	Aegon Open Nottingham; Nottingham, United Kingdom; Grass – €127,000+H – 32S/32Q/16D; Singles – Doubles	(United Kingdom) Ken Skupski (United Kingdom) Neal Skupski; 7–6^{(7–1)}, 2–6, [10–7]	(Australia) Matt Reid (Australia) John-Patrick Smith	(Australia) Sam Groth (Romania) Marius Copil	(Australia) John-Patrick Smith (Ukraine) Sergiy Stakhovsky (United Kingdom) Lloyd Glasspool (United States) Bjorn Fratangelo
June 12	Città di Caltanissetta; Caltanissetta, Italy; Clay – €127,000+H – 32S/32Q/16D; Singles – Doubles	(Italy) Paolo Lorenzi; 6–4, 6–2	(Italy) Alessandro Giannessi	(Moldova) Radu Albot (Germany) Cedrik-Marcel Stebe	(Argentina) Guido Andreozzi (United States) Tennys Sandgren (Kazakhstan) Mikhail Kukushkin (Italy) Marco Cecchinato
June 12	Città di Caltanissetta; Caltanissetta, Italy; Clay – €127,000+H – 32S/32Q/16D; Singles – Doubles	(United States) James Cerretani (United States) Max Schnur; 6–3, 3–6, [10–6]	(Ukraine) Denys Molchanov (Croatia) Franko Škugor	(Moldova) Radu Albot (Germany) Cedrik-Marcel Stebe	(Argentina) Guido Andreozzi (United States) Tennys Sandgren (Kazakhstan) Mikhail Kukushkin (Italy) Marco Cecchinato
June 12	Open Sopra Steria de Lyon; Lyon, France; Clay – €64,000+H – 32S/32Q/16D; Singles – Doubles	(Canada) Félix Auger-Aliassime; 6–4, 6–1	(France) Mathias Bourgue	(France) Tristan Lamasine (Kazakhstan) Aleksandr Nedovyesov	(Argentina) Horacio Zeballos (France) Maxime Chazal (Norway) Casper Ruud (France) Paul-Henri Mathieu
June 12	Open Sopra Steria de Lyon; Lyon, France; Clay – €64,000+H – 32S/32Q/16D; Singles – Doubles	(Belgium) Sander Gillé (Belgium) Joran Vliegen; 6–7^{(2–7)}, 7–6^{(7–2)}, [14–12]	(Germany) Gero Kretschmer (Germany) Alexander Satschko	(France) Tristan Lamasine (Kazakhstan) Aleksandr Nedovyesov	(Argentina) Horacio Zeballos (France) Maxime Chazal (Norway) Casper Ruud (France) Paul-Henri Mathieu
June 12	Lisboa Belém Open; Lisbon, Portugal; Clay – €43,000+H – 32S/32Q/16D; Singles – Doubles	(Germany) Oscar Otte; 4–6, 6–1, 6–3	(Japan) Taro Daniel	(Hungary) Attila Balázs (Italy) Gianluigi Quinzi	(Spain) Daniel Muñoz de la Nava (Belgium) Joris De Loore (France) Gleb Sakharov (Portugal) Pedro Sousa
June 12	Lisboa Belém Open; Lisbon, Portugal; Clay – €43,000+H – 32S/32Q/16D; Singles – Doubles	(South Africa) Ruan Roelofse (Indonesia) Christopher Rungkat; 7–6^{(9–7)}, 6–1	(Portugal) Fred Gil (Portugal) Gonçalo Oliveira	(Hungary) Attila Balázs (Italy) Gianluigi Quinzi	(Spain) Daniel Muñoz de la Nava (Belgium) Joris De Loore (France) Gleb Sakharov (Portugal) Pedro Sousa
June 19	Aegon Ilkley Trophy; Ilkley, United Kingdom; Grass – €127,000 – 32S/32Q/16D; Singles – Doubles	(Hungary) Márton Fucsovics; 6–1, 6–4	(Australia) Alex Bolt	(Russia) Evgeny Donskoy (Australia) Sam Groth	(United Kingdom) Jay Clarke (United States) Taylor Fritz (United States) Bjorn Fratangelo (France) Quentin Halys
June 19	Aegon Ilkley Trophy; Ilkley, United Kingdom; Grass – €127,000 – 32S/32Q/16D; Singles – Doubles	(India) Leander Paes (Canada) Adil Shamasdin; 6–2, 2–6, [10–8]	(United Kingdom) Brydan Klein (United Kingdom) Joe Salisbury	(Russia) Evgeny Donskoy (Australia) Sam Groth	(United Kingdom) Jay Clarke (United States) Taylor Fritz (United States) Bjorn Fratangelo (France) Quentin Halys
June 19	Poprad-Tatry ATP Challenger Tour; Poprad, Slovakia; Clay – €64,000+H – 32S/32Q/16D; Singles – Doubles	(Germany) Cedrik-Marcel Stebe; 6–0, 6–3	(Serbia) Laslo Đere	(Spain) Roberto Carballés Baena (Czech Republic) Adam Pavlásek	(Slovakia) Martin Kližan (Serbia) Filip Krajinović (Sweden) Elias Ymer (Austria) Sebastian Ofner
June 19	Poprad-Tatry ATP Challenger Tour; Poprad, Slovakia; Clay – €64,000+H – 32S/32Q/16D; Singles – Doubles	(Poland) Mateusz Kowalczyk (Germany) Andreas Mies; 6–3, 7–6^{(7–3)}	(Switzerland) Luca Margaroli (Austria) Tristan-Samuel Weissborn	(Spain) Roberto Carballés Baena (Czech Republic) Adam Pavlásek	(Slovakia) Martin Kližan (Serbia) Filip Krajinović (Sweden) Elias Ymer (Austria) Sebastian Ofner
June 19	Fergana Challenger; Fergana, Uzbekistan; Hard – $75,000+H – 32S/32Q/16D; Singles – Doubles	(Belarus) Ilya Ivashka; 6–4, 6–3	(Serbia) Nikola Milojević	(Slovenia) Blaž Kavčič (Israel) Edan Leshem	(Turkey) Cem İlkel (Canada) Brayden Schnur (Poland) Hubert Hurkacz (India) Prajnesh Gunneswaran
June 19	Fergana Challenger; Fergana, Uzbekistan; Hard – $75,000+H – 32S/32Q/16D; Singles – Doubles	(India) Sriram Balaji (India) Vishnu Vardhan; 6–3, 6–3	(Japan) Yuya Kibi (Japan) Shuichi Sekiguchi	(Slovenia) Blaž Kavčič (Israel) Edan Leshem	(Turkey) Cem İlkel (Canada) Brayden Schnur (Poland) Hubert Hurkacz (India) Prajnesh Gunneswaran
June 19	Internazionali di Tennis dell'Umbria; Todi, Italy; Clay – €43,000+H – 32S/32Q/15D; Singles – Doubles	(Argentina) Federico Delbonis; 7–5, 6–1	(Italy) Marco Cecchinato	(Serbia) Dušan Lajović (Italy) Liam Caruana	(Portugal) Gastão Elias (Argentina) Facundo Bagnis (France) Gleb Sakharov (Belgium) Arthur De Greef
June 19	Internazionali di Tennis dell'Umbria; Todi, Italy; Clay – €43,000+H – 32S/32Q/15D; Singles – Doubles	(Australia) Steven de Waard (New Zealand) Ben McLachlan; 6–7^{(7–9)}, 6–4, [10–7]	(Croatia) Marin Draganja (Croatia) Tomislav Draganja	(Serbia) Dušan Lajović (Italy) Liam Caruana	(Portugal) Gastão Elias (Argentina) Facundo Bagnis (France) Gleb Sakharov (Belgium) Arthur De Greef
June 19	Internationaux de Tennis de Blois; Blois, France; Clay – €43,000+H – 32S/32Q/16D; Singles – Doubles	(Bosnia and Herzegovina) Damir Džumhur; 6–1, 6–3	(France) Calvin Hemery	(Switzerland) Henri Laaksonen (France) Mathias Bourgue	(France) Alexandre Müller (Slovenia) Blaž Rola (Norway) Casper Ruud (Portugal) Pedro Sousa
June 19	Internationaux de Tennis de Blois; Blois, France; Clay – €43,000+H – 32S/32Q/16D; Singles – Doubles	(Belgium) Sander Gillé (Belgium) Joran Vliegen; 3–6, 6–3, [10–7]	(Argentina) Máximo González (Brazil) Fabrício Neis	(Switzerland) Henri Laaksonen (France) Mathias Bourgue	(France) Alexandre Müller (Slovenia) Blaž Rola (Norway) Casper Ruud (Portugal) Pedro Sousa
June 26	Aspria Tennis Cup; Milan, Italy; Clay – €43,000+H – 32S/32Q/16D; Singles – Doubles	(Argentina) Guido Pella; 6–2, 2–1 ret.	(Argentina) Federico Delbonis	(Italy) Marco Cecchinato (Spain) Tommy Robredo	(Argentina) Juan Ignacio Londero (Belarus) Uladzimir Ignatik (Italy) Gianluca Mager (Dominican Republic) José Hernández-Fernández
June 26	Aspria Tennis Cup; Milan, Italy; Clay – €43,000+H – 32S/32Q/16D; Singles – Doubles	(Poland) Tomasz Bednarek (Netherlands) David Pel; 6–1, 6–1	(Italy) Filippo Baldi (Italy) Omar Giacalone	(Italy) Marco Cecchinato (Spain) Tommy Robredo	(Argentina) Juan Ignacio Londero (Belarus) Uladzimir Ignatik (Italy) Gianluca Mager (Dominican Republic) José Hernández-Fernández

=== July ===
Week of	Tournament	Champions	Runners-up	Semifinalists	Quarterfinalists
July 3	Marburg Open; Marburg, Germany; Clay – €43,000+H – 32S/32Q/16D; Singles – Doubles	(Serbia) Filip Krajinović; 6–2, 6–3	(Germany) Cedrik-Marcel Stebe	(Belgium) Arthur De Greef (Spain) Guillermo García López	(Germany) Yannick Hanfmann (France) Benjamin Bonzi (Brazil) João Pedro Sorgi (Germany) Matthias Bachinger
July 3	Marburg Open; Marburg, Germany; Clay – €43,000+H – 32S/32Q/16D; Singles – Doubles	(Argentina) Máximo González (Brazil) Fabrício Neis; 6–3, 7–6^{(7–4)}	(Australia) Rameez Junaid (South Africa) Ruan Roelofse	(Belgium) Arthur De Greef (Spain) Guillermo García López	(Germany) Yannick Hanfmann (France) Benjamin Bonzi (Brazil) João Pedro Sorgi (Germany) Matthias Bachinger
July 3	Guzzini Challenger; Recanati, Italy; Hard – €43,000+H – 32S/32Q/16D; Singles – Doubles	(Croatia) Viktor Galović; 7–6^{(7–3)}, 6–4	(Bosnia and Herzegovina) Mirza Bašić	(Italy) Luca Vanni (Italy) Salvatore Caruso	(Germany) Mats Moraing (Spain) Adrián Menéndez Maceiras (Italy) Andrea Arnaboldi (France) Quentin Halys
July 3	Guzzini Challenger; Recanati, Italy; Hard – €43,000+H – 32S/32Q/16D; Singles – Doubles	(France) Jonathan Eysseric (France) Quentin Halys; 6–7^{(3–7)}, 6–4, [12–10]	(Italy) Julian Ocleppo (Italy) Andrea Vavassori	(Italy) Luca Vanni (Italy) Salvatore Caruso	(Germany) Mats Moraing (Spain) Adrián Menéndez Maceiras (Italy) Andrea Arnaboldi (France) Quentin Halys
July 10	Sparkassen Open; Braunschweig, Germany; Clay – €127,000+H – 32S/32Q/16D; Singles – Doubles	(Spain) Nicola Kuhn; 2–6, 7–5, 4–2 ret.	(Croatia) Viktor Galović	(Hungary) Márton Fucsovics (Germany) Oscar Otte	(Moldova) Radu Albot (Slovakia) Jozef Kovalík (Germany) Yannick Maden (Poland) Jerzy Janowicz
July 10	Sparkassen Open; Braunschweig, Germany; Clay – €127,000+H – 32S/32Q/16D; Singles – Doubles	(Austria) Julian Knowle (Slovakia) Igor Zelenay; 6–3, 7–6^{(7–3)}	(Germany) Kevin Krawietz (Germany) Gero Kretschmer	(Hungary) Márton Fucsovics (Germany) Oscar Otte	(Moldova) Radu Albot (Slovakia) Jozef Kovalík (Germany) Yannick Maden (Poland) Jerzy Janowicz
July 10	Båstad Challenger; Båstad, Sweden; Clay – €43,000+H – 32S/32Q/16D; Singles – Doubles	(Serbia) Dušan Lajović; 6–2, 7–6^{(7–4)}	(Argentina) Leonardo Mayer	(Argentina) Facundo Bagnis (Sweden) Mikael Ymer	(Sweden) Elias Ymer (Kazakhstan) Aleksandr Nedovyesov (Switzerland) Henri Laaksonen (Argentina) Renzo Olivo
July 10	Båstad Challenger; Båstad, Sweden; Clay – €43,000+H – 32S/32Q/16D; Singles – Doubles	(Turkey) Tuna Altuna (Czech Republic) Václav Šafránek; 6–1, 6–4	(India) Sriram Balaji (India) Vijay Sundar Prashanth	(Argentina) Facundo Bagnis (Sweden) Mikael Ymer	(Sweden) Elias Ymer (Kazakhstan) Aleksandr Nedovyesov (Switzerland) Henri Laaksonen (Argentina) Renzo Olivo
July 10	Internazionali di Tennis Città di Perugia; Perugia, Italy; Clay – €43,000+H – 32S/32Q/16D; Singles – Doubles	(Serbia) Laslo Đere; 7–6^{(7–2)}, 6–4	(Spain) Daniel Muñoz de la Nava	(Austria) Gerald Melzer (Spain) Marcel Granollers	(France) Benjamin Bonzi (Greece) Stefanos Tsitsipas (Italy) Salvatore Caruso (France) Gleb Sakharov
July 10	Internazionali di Tennis Città di Perugia; Perugia, Italy; Clay – €43,000+H – 32S/32Q/16D; Singles – Doubles	(Italy) Salvatore Caruso (France) Jonathan Eysseric; 6–3, 6–3	(Argentina) Nicolás Kicker (Brazil) Fabrício Neis	(Austria) Gerald Melzer (Spain) Marcel Granollers	(France) Benjamin Bonzi (Greece) Stefanos Tsitsipas (Italy) Salvatore Caruso (France) Gleb Sakharov
July 10	Nielsen Pro Tennis Championship; Winnetka, United States; Hard – $75,000 – 32S/32Q/16D; Singles – Doubles	(Japan) Akira Santillan; 7–6^{(7–1)}, 6–2	(India) Ramkumar Ramanathan	(Germany) Matthias Bachinger (United States) Tommy Paul	(United States) Tennys Sandgren (United States) Dennis Nevolo (Germany) Dominik Köpfer (United States) Martin Redlicki
July 10	Nielsen Pro Tennis Championship; Winnetka, United States; Hard – $75,000 – 32S/32Q/16D; Singles – Doubles	(Thailand) Sanchai Ratiwatana (Indonesia) Christopher Rungkat; 7–6^{(7–4)}, 6–2	(United States) Kevin King (United States) Bradley Klahn	(Germany) Matthias Bachinger (United States) Tommy Paul	(United States) Tennys Sandgren (United States) Dennis Nevolo (Germany) Dominik Köpfer (United States) Martin Redlicki
July 10	Claro Open Medellín; Medellín, Colombia; Clay – $50,000+H – 32S/32Q/16D; Singles – Doubles	(Chile) Nicolás Jarry; 6–1, 3–6, 7–6^{(7–0)}	(Brazil) João Souza	(New Zealand) Rubin Statham (Barbados) Darian King	(Colombia) Alejandro González (Colombia) Daniel Elahi Galán (Colombia) Carlos Salamanca (Ecuador) Roberto Quiroz
July 10	Claro Open Medellín; Medellín, Colombia; Clay – $50,000+H – 32S/32Q/16D; Singles – Doubles	(Barbados) Darian King (Mexico) Miguel Ángel Reyes-Varela; 6–4, 6–4	(Chile) Nicolás Jarry (Ecuador) Roberto Quiroz	(New Zealand) Rubin Statham (Barbados) Darian King	(Colombia) Alejandro González (Colombia) Daniel Elahi Galán (Colombia) Carlos Salamanca (Ecuador) Roberto Quiroz
July 10	Winnipeg National Bank Challenger; Winnipeg, Canada; Hard – $75,000 – 32S/32Q/16D; Singles – Doubles	(Slovenia) Blaž Kavčič; 7–5, 3–6, 7–5	(Canada) Peter Polansky	(Israel) Edan Leshem (Japan) Yasutaka Uchiyama	(United States) Raymond Sarmiento (Japan) Yusuke Takahashi (Australia) Max Purcell (Canada) Brayden Schnur
July 10	Winnipeg National Bank Challenger; Winnipeg, Canada; Hard – $75,000 – 32S/32Q/16D; Singles – Doubles	(United Kingdom) Luke Bambridge (Republic of Ireland) David O'Hare; 6–2, 6–2	(Japan) Yusuke Takahashi (Japan) Renta Tokuda	(Israel) Edan Leshem (Japan) Yasutaka Uchiyama	(United States) Raymond Sarmiento (Japan) Yusuke Takahashi (Australia) Max Purcell (Canada) Brayden Schnur
July 17	President's Cup; Astana, Kazakhstan; Hard – $125,000+H – 32S/32Q/16D; Singles – Doubles	(Belarus) Egor Gerasimov; 7–6^{(11–9)}, 4–6, 6–4	(Kazakhstan) Mikhail Kukushkin	(Bosnia and Herzegovina) Aldin Šetkić (Kazakhstan) Alexander Bublik	(Russia) Evgeny Donskoy (South Korea) Lee Duck-hee (South Korea) Kwon Soon-woo (Kazakhstan) Dmitry Popko
July 17	President's Cup; Astana, Kazakhstan; Hard – $125,000+H – 32S/32Q/16D; Singles – Doubles	(Japan) Toshihide Matsui (India) Vishnu Vardhan; 7–6^{(7–3)}, 6–7^{(5–7)}, [10–7]	(Russia) Evgeny Karlovskiy (Russia) Evgenii Tiurnev	(Bosnia and Herzegovina) Aldin Šetkić (Kazakhstan) Alexander Bublik	(Russia) Evgeny Donskoy (South Korea) Lee Duck-hee (South Korea) Kwon Soon-woo (Kazakhstan) Dmitry Popko
July 17	Poznań Open; Poznań, Poland; Clay – €64,000+H – 32S/32Q/16D; Singles – Doubles	(Russia) Alexey Vatutin; 2–6, 7–6^{(12–10)}, 6–3	(Argentina) Guido Andreozzi	(Czech Republic) Adam Pavlásek (Portugal) Gonçalo Oliveira	(Czech Republic) Zdeněk Kolář (Spain) Rubén Ramírez Hidalgo (France) Jonathan Eysseric (Czech Republic) Lukáš Rosol
July 17	Poznań Open; Poznań, Poland; Clay – €64,000+H – 32S/32Q/16D; Singles – Doubles	(Argentina) Guido Andreozzi (Spain) Jaume Munar; 6–7^{(4–7)}, 6–3, [10–4]	(Poland) Tomasz Bednarek (Portugal) Gonçalo Oliveira	(Czech Republic) Adam Pavlásek (Portugal) Gonçalo Oliveira	(Czech Republic) Zdeněk Kolář (Spain) Rubén Ramírez Hidalgo (France) Jonathan Eysseric (Czech Republic) Lukáš Rosol
July 17	San Benedetto Tennis Cup; San Benedetto del Tronto, Italy; Clay – €64,000+H – 32S/32Q/16D; Singles – Doubles	(Italy) Matteo Berrettini; 6–3, 6–4	(Serbia) Laslo Đere	(Argentina) Federico Coria (Spain) Carlos Taberner	(Portugal) Pedro Sousa (Dominican Republic) José Hernández-Fernández (France) Benjamin Bonzi (Spain) Marcel Granollers
July 17	San Benedetto Tennis Cup; San Benedetto del Tronto, Italy; Clay – €64,000+H – 32S/32Q/16D; Singles – Doubles	(Spain) Carlos Taberner (Spain) Pol Toledo Bagué; 7–5, 6–4	(Italy) Flavio Cipolla (Romania) Adrian Ungur	(Argentina) Federico Coria (Spain) Carlos Taberner	(Portugal) Pedro Sousa (Dominican Republic) José Hernández-Fernández (France) Benjamin Bonzi (Spain) Marcel Granollers
July 17	The Hague Open; Scheveningen, Netherlands; Clay – €64,000+H – 32S/32Q/16D; Singles – Doubles	(Spain) Guillermo García López; 6–1, 6–7^{(3–7)}, 6–2	(Belgium) Ruben Bemelmans	(Netherlands) Thiemo de Bakker (Serbia) Marko Tepavac	(Greece) Stefanos Tsitsipas (Netherlands) Botic van de Zandschulp (Italy) Simone Bolelli (Belgium) Joris De Loore
July 17	The Hague Open; Scheveningen, Netherlands; Clay – €64,000+H – 32S/32Q/16D; Singles – Doubles	(Belgium) Sander Gillé (Belgium) Joran Vliegen; 6–2, 4–6, [12–10]	(Slovakia) Jozef Kovalík (Greece) Stefanos Tsitsipas	(Netherlands) Thiemo de Bakker (Serbia) Marko Tepavac	(Greece) Stefanos Tsitsipas (Netherlands) Botic van de Zandschulp (Italy) Simone Bolelli (Belgium) Joris De Loore
July 17	Challenger Banque Nationale de Gatineau; Gatineau, Canada; Hard – $50,000+H – 32S/32Q/16D; Singles – Doubles	(Canada) Denis Shapovalov; 6–1, 3–6, 6–3	(Canada) Peter Polansky	(Tunisia) Malek Jaziri (United States) Alexander Sarkissian	(France) Vincent Millot (United States) Marcos Giron (India) Yuki Bhambri (Italy) Thomas Fabbiano
July 17	Challenger Banque Nationale de Gatineau; Gatineau, Canada; Hard – $50,000+H – 32S/32Q/16D; Singles – Doubles	(United States) Bradley Klahn (United States) Jackson Withrow; 6–2, 6–3	(Mexico) Hans Hach Verdugo (France) Vincent Millot	(Tunisia) Malek Jaziri (United States) Alexander Sarkissian	(France) Vincent Millot (United States) Marcos Giron (India) Yuki Bhambri (Italy) Thomas Fabbiano
July 24	Challenger Banque Nationale de Granby; Granby, Canada; Hard – $100,000 – 32S/32Q/16D; Singles – Doubles	(Slovenia) Blaž Kavčič; 6–3, 2–6, 7–5	(Canada) Peter Polansky	(Canada) Brayden Schnur (Canada) Denis Shapovalov	(Japan) Tatsuma Ito (Australia) Max Purcell (United States) Mackenzie McDonald (Japan) Yasutaka Uchiyama
July 24	Challenger Banque Nationale de Granby; Granby, Canada; Hard – $100,000 – 32S/32Q/16D; Singles – Doubles	(United Kingdom) Joe Salisbury (United States) Jackson Withrow; 4–6, 6–3, [10–6]	(Uruguay) Marcel Felder (Japan) Go Soeda	(Canada) Brayden Schnur (Canada) Denis Shapovalov	(Japan) Tatsuma Ito (Australia) Max Purcell (United States) Mackenzie McDonald (Japan) Yasutaka Uchiyama
July 24	Levene Gouldin & Thompson Tennis Challenger; Binghamton, United States; Hard – $75,000 – 32S/32Q/16D; Singles – Doubles	(United Kingdom) Cameron Norrie; 6–4, 0–6, 6–4	(Australia) Jordan Thompson	(United States) William Blumberg (United States) Christian Harrison	(Germany) Dominik Köpfer (China) Zhang Ze (Slovenia) Blaž Rola (Kazakhstan) Alexander Bublik
July 24	Levene Gouldin & Thompson Tennis Challenger; Binghamton, United States; Hard – $75,000 – 32S/32Q/16D; Singles – Doubles	(United States) Denis Kudla (United States) Daniel Nguyen; 6–3, 7–6^{(7–5)}	(Australia) Jarryd Chaplin (Australia) Luke Saville	(United States) William Blumberg (United States) Christian Harrison	(Germany) Dominik Köpfer (China) Zhang Ze (Slovenia) Blaž Rola (Kazakhstan) Alexander Bublik
July 24	International Tennis Tournament of Cortina; Cortina d'Ampezzo, Italy; Clay – €64,000 – 32S/32Q/16D; Singles – Doubles	(Spain) Roberto Carballés Baena; 6–1, 6–0	(Austria) Gerald Melzer	(Italy) Matteo Viola (Spain) Marcel Granollers	(Spain) Carlos Taberner (Argentina) Pedro Cachin (Belgium) Clément Geens (Argentina) Guido Andreozzi
July 24	International Tennis Tournament of Cortina; Cortina d'Ampezzo, Italy; Clay – €64,000 – 32S/32Q/16D; Singles – Doubles	(Argentina) Guido Andreozzi (Austria) Gerald Melzer; 6–2, 7–6^{(7–4)}	(Australia) Steven de Waard (Japan) Ben McLachlan	(Italy) Matteo Viola (Spain) Marcel Granollers	(Spain) Carlos Taberner (Argentina) Pedro Cachin (Belgium) Clément Geens (Argentina) Guido Andreozzi
July 24	Advantage Cars Prague Open; Prague, Czech Republic; Clay – €43,000+H – 32S/32Q/16D; Singles – Doubles	(Slovakia) Andrej Martin; 7–6^{(7–3)}, 6–3	(Germany) Yannick Maden	(Czech Republic) Adam Pavlásek (Portugal) João Domingues	(Czech Republic) Zdeněk Kolář (Germany) Tobias Kamke (Austria) Jurij Rodionov (Russia) Roman Safiullin
July 24	Advantage Cars Prague Open; Prague, Czech Republic; Clay – €43,000+H – 32S/32Q/16D; Singles – Doubles	(Czech Republic) Jan Šátral (Austria) Tristan-Samuel Weissborn; 6–3, 5–7, [10–3]	(Germany) Gero Kretschmer (Germany) Andreas Mies	(Czech Republic) Adam Pavlásek (Portugal) João Domingues	(Czech Republic) Zdeněk Kolář (Germany) Tobias Kamke (Austria) Jurij Rodionov (Russia) Roman Safiullin
July 24	Tampere Open; Tampere, Finland; Clay – €43,000+H – 32S/32Q/15D; Singles – Doubles	(France) Calvin Hemery; 6–3, 6–4	(Portugal) Pedro Sousa	(Spain) Íñigo Cervantes (Russia) Alexey Vatutin	(Kazakhstan) Dmitry Popko (Netherlands) Tallon Griekspoor (Belgium) Yannik Reuter (Austria) Sebastian Ofner
July 24	Tampere Open; Tampere, Finland; Clay – €43,000+H – 32S/32Q/15D; Singles – Doubles	(Belgium) Sander Gillé (Belgium) Joran Vliegen; 6–2, 6–7^{(5–7)}, [10–3]	(Mexico) Lucas Gómez (Argentina) Juan Ignacio Londero	(Spain) Íñigo Cervantes (Russia) Alexey Vatutin	(Kazakhstan) Dmitry Popko (Netherlands) Tallon Griekspoor (Belgium) Yannik Reuter (Austria) Sebastian Ofner
July 31	Chengdu Challenger; Chengdu, China; Hard – $125,000 – 32S/32Q/16D; Singles – Doubles	(Chinese Taipei) Lu Yen-hsun; 6–3, 6–4	(Russia) Evgeny Donskoy	(China) Wu Yibing (Serbia) Nikola Milojević	(Serbia) Miomir Kecmanović (Japan) Yusuke Takahashi (United Kingdom) James Ward (China) Gao Xin
July 31	Chengdu Challenger; Chengdu, China; Hard – $125,000 – 32S/32Q/16D; Singles – Doubles	(India) Sriram Balaji (India) Vishnu Vardhan; 6–3, 6–4	(Chinese Taipei) Hsieh Cheng-peng (Chinese Taipei) Peng Hsien-yin	(China) Wu Yibing (Serbia) Nikola Milojević	(Serbia) Miomir Kecmanović (Japan) Yusuke Takahashi (United Kingdom) James Ward (China) Gao Xin
July 31	Thindown Challenger Biella; Biella, Italy; Clay – €106,000+H – 32S/32Q/16D; Singles – Doubles	(Serbia) Filip Krajinović; 6–3, 6–2	(Italy) Salvatore Caruso	(Brazil) João Souza (Italy) Andrea Arnaboldi	(Italy) Marco Cecchinato (Sweden) Mikael Ymer (Italy) Stefano Travaglia (Argentina) Federico Coria
July 31	Thindown Challenger Biella; Biella, Italy; Clay – €106,000+H – 32S/32Q/16D; Singles – Doubles	(Hungary) Attila Balázs (Brazil) Fabiano de Paula; 5–7, 6–4, [10–4]	(Sweden) Johan Brunström (Croatia) Dino Marcan	(Brazil) João Souza (Italy) Andrea Arnaboldi	(Italy) Marco Cecchinato (Sweden) Mikael Ymer (Italy) Stefano Travaglia (Argentina) Federico Coria
July 31	Open Castilla y León; Segovia, Spain; Hard – €85,000+H – 32S/32Q/16D; Singles – Doubles	(Spain) Jaume Munar; 6–3, 6–4	(Australia) Alex de Minaur	(Spain) Gerard Granollers (Italy) Matteo Berrettini	(Spain) Marcel Granollers (France) Laurent Lokoli (Netherlands) Tallon Griekspoor (Bosnia and Herzegovina) Aldin Šetkić
July 31	Open Castilla y León; Segovia, Spain; Hard – €85,000+H – 32S/32Q/16D; Singles – Doubles	(Spain) Adrián Menéndez Maceiras (Ukraine) Sergiy Stakhovsky; 4–6, 6–3, [10–7]	(Spain) Roberto Ortega Olmedo (Spain) David Vega Hernández	(Spain) Gerard Granollers (Italy) Matteo Berrettini	(Spain) Marcel Granollers (France) Laurent Lokoli (Netherlands) Tallon Griekspoor (Bosnia and Herzegovina) Aldin Šetkić
July 31	Kentucky Bank Tennis Championships; Lexington, United States; Hard – $75,000 – 32S/32Q/14D; Singles – Doubles	(United States) Michael Mmoh; 4–6, 7–6^{(7–3)}, 6–3	(Australia) John Millman	(United Kingdom) Cameron Norrie (United States) Raymond Sarmiento	(Germany) Dominik Köpfer (Australia) Max Purcell (United States) Daniel Nguyen (United States) Denis Kudla
July 31	Kentucky Bank Tennis Championships; Lexington, United States; Hard – $75,000 – 32S/32Q/14D; Singles – Doubles	(Australia) Alex Bolt (Australia) Max Purcell; 7–5, 6–4	(France) Tom Jomby (United States) Eric Quigley	(United Kingdom) Cameron Norrie (United States) Raymond Sarmiento	(Germany) Dominik Köpfer (Australia) Max Purcell (United States) Daniel Nguyen (United States) Denis Kudla
July 31	Svijany Open; Liberec, Czech Republic; Clay – €43,000+H – 32S/32Q/16D; Singles – Doubles	(Portugal) Pedro Sousa; 6–4, 5–7, 6–2	(Brazil) Guilherme Clezar	(Spain) Ricardo Ojeda Lara (Czech Republic) Václav Šafránek	(Germany) Jeremy Jahn (Germany) Tobias Kamke (Lithuania) Laurynas Grigelis (Germany) Oscar Otte
July 31	Svijany Open; Liberec, Czech Republic; Clay – €43,000+H – 32S/32Q/16D; Singles – Doubles	(Lithuania) Laurynas Grigelis (Czech Republic) Zdeněk Kolář; 6–3, 6–4	(Poland) Tomasz Bednarek (Netherlands) David Pel	(Spain) Ricardo Ojeda Lara (Czech Republic) Václav Šafránek	(Germany) Jeremy Jahn (Germany) Tobias Kamke (Lithuania) Laurynas Grigelis (Germany) Oscar Otte

=== August ===
Week of	Tournament	Champions	Runners-up	Semifinalists	Quarterfinalists
August 7	China International Challenger Jinan; Jinan, China; Hard – $150,000 – 32S/32Q/14D; Singles – Doubles	(Chinese Taipei) Lu Yen-hsun; 6–3, 6–1	(Lithuania) Ričardas Berankis	(Japan) Go Soeda (Russia) Evgeny Donskoy	(South Korea) Kwon Soon-woo (Japan) Kento Takeuchi (South Korea) Lee Duck-hee (Australia) Dayne Kelly
August 7	China International Challenger Jinan; Jinan, China; Hard – $150,000 – 32S/32Q/14D; Singles – Doubles	(Chinese Taipei) Hsieh Cheng-peng (Chinese Taipei) Peng Hsien-yin; 4–6, 6–4, [10–4]	(India) Sriram Balaji (India) Vishnu Vardhan	(Japan) Go Soeda (Russia) Evgeny Donskoy	(South Korea) Kwon Soon-woo (Japan) Kento Takeuchi (South Korea) Lee Duck-hee (Australia) Dayne Kelly
August 7	Nordic Naturals Challenger; Aptos, United States; Hard – $100,000 – 32S/32Q/16D; Singles – Doubles	(Kazakhstan) Alexander Bublik; 6–2, 6–3	(United Kingdom) Liam Broady	(United States) Taylor Fritz (Australia) Sam Groth	(United States) Tennys Sandgren (United States) Raymond Sarmiento (United States) Dennis Novikov (Australia) Akira Santillan
August 7	Nordic Naturals Challenger; Aptos, United States; Hard – $100,000 – 32S/32Q/16D; Singles – Doubles	(Israel) Jonathan Erlich (United Kingdom) Neal Skupski; 6–3, 2–6, [10–8]	(Australia) Alex Bolt (Australia) Jordan Thompson	(United States) Taylor Fritz (Australia) Sam Groth	(United States) Tennys Sandgren (United States) Raymond Sarmiento (United States) Dennis Novikov (Australia) Akira Santillan
August 7	Claro Open Floridablanca; Floridablanca, Colombia; Clay – $50,000+H – 32S/32Q/16D; Singles – Doubles	(Argentina) Guido Pella; 6–2, 6–4	(Argentina) Facundo Argüello	(Portugal) Gastão Elias (Chile) Gonzalo Lama	(United States) Evan King (Brazil) João Souza (Austria) Michael Linzer (Brazil) Guilherme Clezar
August 7	Claro Open Floridablanca; Floridablanca, Colombia; Clay – $50,000+H – 32S/32Q/16D; Singles – Doubles	(Peru) Sergio Galdós (Chile) Nicolás Jarry; 6–3, 5–7, [10–1]	(United States) Sekou Bangoura (United States) Evan King	(Portugal) Gastão Elias (Chile) Gonzalo Lama	(United States) Evan King (Brazil) João Souza (Austria) Michael Linzer (Brazil) Guilherme Clezar
August 7	Tilia Slovenia Open; Portorož, Slovenia; Hard – €43,000+H – 32S/32Q/16D; Singles – Doubles	(Ukraine) Sergiy Stakhovsky; 6–7^{(4–7)}, 7–6^{(8–6)}, 6–3	(Italy) Matteo Berrettini	(Bosnia and Herzegovina) Aldin Šetkić (Greece) Stefanos Tsitsipas	(Spain) Pedro Martínez (Belarus) Ilya Ivashka (Serbia) Filip Krajinović (Croatia) Franko Škugor
August 7	Tilia Slovenia Open; Portorož, Slovenia; Hard – €43,000+H – 32S/32Q/16D; Singles – Doubles	(Chile) Hans Podlipnik Castillo (Belarus) Andrei Vasilevski; 6–3, 7–6^{(7–4)}	(Czech Republic) Lukáš Rosol (Croatia) Franko Škugor	(Bosnia and Herzegovina) Aldin Šetkić (Greece) Stefanos Tsitsipas	(Spain) Pedro Martínez (Belarus) Ilya Ivashka (Serbia) Filip Krajinović (Croatia) Franko Škugor
August 14	Milex Open; Santo Domingo, Dominican Republic; Clay – $125,000 – 32S/32Q/16D; Singles – Doubles	(Dominican Republic) Víctor Estrella Burgos; 7–6^{(7–4)}, 6–4	(Bosnia and Herzegovina) Damir Džumhur	(Chile) Nicolás Jarry (Portugal) Gastão Elias	(United States) Evan King (Argentina) Guido Pella (Norway) Casper Ruud (Colombia) Cristian Rodríguez
August 14	Milex Open; Santo Domingo, Dominican Republic; Clay – $125,000 – 32S/32Q/16D; Singles – Doubles	(Argentina) Juan Ignacio Londero (Venezuela) Luis David Martínez; 6–4, 6–4	(Colombia) Daniel Elahi Galán (Colombia) Santiago Giraldo	(Chile) Nicolás Jarry (Portugal) Gastão Elias	(United States) Evan King (Argentina) Guido Pella (Norway) Casper Ruud (Colombia) Cristian Rodríguez
August 14	Odlum Brown Vancouver Open; Vancouver, Canada; Hard – $100,000 – 32S/32Q/16D; Singles – Doubles	(Germany) Cedrik-Marcel Stebe; 6–0, 6–1	(Australia) Jordan Thompson	(Belgium) Joris De Loore (Italy) Stefano Napolitano	(United Kingdom) Liam Broady (United States) Taylor Fritz (South Africa) Lloyd Harris (Canada) Brayden Schnur
August 14	Odlum Brown Vancouver Open; Vancouver, Canada; Hard – $100,000 – 32S/32Q/16D; Singles – Doubles	(United States) James Cerretani (United Kingdom) Neal Skupski; 7–6^{(8–6)}, 6–2	(Philippines) Treat Huey (Sweden) Robert Lindstedt	(Belgium) Joris De Loore (Italy) Stefano Napolitano	(United Kingdom) Liam Broady (United States) Taylor Fritz (South Africa) Lloyd Harris (Canada) Brayden Schnur
August 14	Internazionali di Tennis del Friuli Venezia Giulia; Cordenons, Italy; Clay – €64,000+H – 32S/32Q/16D; Singles – Doubles	(Sweden) Elias Ymer; 6–2, 6–3	(Spain) Roberto Carballés Baena	(Serbia) Laslo Đere (Italy) Lorenzo Giustino	(Spain) Enrique López Pérez (Portugal) Gonçalo Oliveira (Spain) Pedro Martínez (Italy) Andrea Pellegrino
August 14	Internazionali di Tennis del Friuli Venezia Giulia; Cordenons, Italy; Clay – €64,000+H – 32S/32Q/16D; Singles – Doubles	(Czech Republic) Roman Jebavý (Czech Republic) Zdeněk Kolář; 6–2, 6–3	(Netherlands) Matwé Middelkoop (Slovakia) Igor Zelenay	(Serbia) Laslo Đere (Italy) Lorenzo Giustino	(Spain) Enrique López Pérez (Portugal) Gonçalo Oliveira (Spain) Pedro Martínez (Italy) Andrea Pellegrino
August 14	Bucher Reisen Tennis Grand Prix; Meerbusch, Germany; Clay – €43,000+H – 32S/32Q/16D; Singles – Doubles	(Spain) Ricardo Ojeda Lara; 6–4, 6–3	(Austria) Andreas Haider-Maurer	(Egypt) Karim-Mohamed Maamoun (Spain) Nicola Kuhn	(Germany) Florian Mayer (Germany) Jeremy Jahn (Kazakhstan) Aleksandr Nedovyesov (Czech Republic) Václav Šafránek
August 14	Bucher Reisen Tennis Grand Prix; Meerbusch, Germany; Clay – €43,000+H – 32S/32Q/16D; Singles – Doubles	(Germany) Kevin Krawietz (Germany) Andreas Mies; 6–1, 7–6^{(7–5)}	(Germany) Dustin Brown (Croatia) Antonio Šančić	(Egypt) Karim-Mohamed Maamoun (Spain) Nicola Kuhn	(Germany) Florian Mayer (Germany) Jeremy Jahn (Kazakhstan) Aleksandr Nedovyesov (Czech Republic) Václav Šafránek
August 21	Antonio Savoldi–Marco Cò – Trofeo Dimmidisì; Manerbio, Italy; Clay – €43,000+H – 32S/32Q/16D; Singles – Doubles	(Spain) Roberto Carballés Baena; 6–4, 2–6, 6–2	(Spain) Guillermo García López	(Sweden) Elias Ymer (Spain) Tommy Robredo	(Germany) Oscar Otte (Spain) Carlos Taberner (Italy) Lorenzo Sonego (Czech Republic) Adam Pavlásek
August 21	Antonio Savoldi–Marco Cò – Trofeo Dimmidisì; Manerbio, Italy; Clay – €43,000+H – 32S/32Q/16D; Singles – Doubles	(Monaco) Romain Arneodo (France) Hugo Nys; 4–6, 7–6^{(7–3)}, [10–5]	(Russia) Mikhail Elgin (Czech Republic) Roman Jebavý	(Sweden) Elias Ymer (Spain) Tommy Robredo	(Germany) Oscar Otte (Spain) Carlos Taberner (Italy) Lorenzo Sonego (Czech Republic) Adam Pavlásek
August 28	Città di Como Challenger; Como, Italy; Clay – €43,000+H – 32S/32Q/16D; Singles – Doubles	(Portugal) Pedro Sousa; 1–6, 6–2, 6–4	(Italy) Marco Cecchinato	(Serbia) Filip Krajinović (France) Corentin Moutet	(Germany) Oscar Otte (Portugal) Gastão Elias (France) Kenny de Schepper (Italy) Matteo Donati
August 28	Città di Como Challenger; Como, Italy; Clay – €43,000+H – 32S/32Q/16D; Singles – Doubles	(Netherlands) Sander Arends (Croatia) Antonio Šančić; 7–6^{(7–1)}, 6–2	(Belarus) Aliaksandr Bury (Germany) Kevin Krawietz	(Serbia) Filip Krajinović (France) Corentin Moutet	(Germany) Oscar Otte (Portugal) Gastão Elias (France) Kenny de Schepper (Italy) Matteo Donati
August 28	Quito Challenger; Quito, Ecuador; Clay – $50,000+H – 32S/32Q/16D; Singles – Doubles	(Chile) Nicolás Jarry; 6–3, 6–2	(Austria) Gerald Melzer	(Dominican Republic) Víctor Estrella Burgos (Argentina) Facundo Mena	(Slovakia) Andrej Martin (Brazil) Guilherme Clezar (France) Maxime Hamou (Chile) Gonzalo Lama
August 28	Quito Challenger; Quito, Ecuador; Clay – $50,000+H – 32S/32Q/16D; Singles – Doubles	(El Salvador) Marcelo Arévalo (Mexico) Miguel Ángel Reyes-Varela; 4–6, 6–4, [10–7]	(Chile) Nicolás Jarry (Ecuador) Roberto Quiroz	(Dominican Republic) Víctor Estrella Burgos (Argentina) Facundo Mena	(Slovakia) Andrej Martin (Brazil) Guilherme Clezar (France) Maxime Hamou (Chile) Gonzalo Lama

=== September ===
Week of	Tournament	Champions	Runners-up	Semifinalists	Quarterfinalists
September 4	AON Open Challenger; Genoa, Italy; Clay – €127,000+H – 32S/32Q/16D; Singles – Doubles	(Greece) Stefanos Tsitsipas; 7–5, 7–6^{(7–2)}	(Spain) Guillermo García López	(Hungary) Márton Fucsovics (Italy) Stefano Napolitano	(Germany) Jan-Lennard Struff (Hungary) Attila Balázs (Italy) Matteo Donati (Italy) Andrea Basso
September 4	AON Open Challenger; Genoa, Italy; Clay – €127,000+H – 32S/32Q/16D; Singles – Doubles	(Germany) Tim Pütz (Germany) Jan-Lennard Struff; 7–6^{(7–5)}, 7–6^{(10–8)}	(Argentina) Guido Andreozzi (Uruguay) Ariel Behar	(Hungary) Márton Fucsovics (Italy) Stefano Napolitano	(Germany) Jan-Lennard Struff (Hungary) Attila Balázs (Italy) Matteo Donati (Italy) Andrea Basso
September 4	Copa Sevilla; Seville, Spain; Clay – €64,000+H – 32S/32Q/16D; Singles – Doubles	(Canada) Félix Auger-Aliassime; 6–7^{(4–7)}, 6–3, 6–3	(Spain) Íñigo Cervantes	(France) Corentin Moutet (Serbia) Filip Krajinović	(Spain) Carlos Gómez-Herrera (Spain) Jaume Munar (Japan) Taro Daniel (Spain) Roberto Carballés Baena
September 4	Copa Sevilla; Seville, Spain; Clay – €64,000+H – 32S/32Q/16D; Singles – Doubles	(Argentina) Pedro Cachin (Spain) Íñigo Cervantes; 7–6^{(7–5)}, 3–6, [10–5]	(Russia) Ivan Gakhov (Spain) David Vega Hernández	(France) Corentin Moutet (Serbia) Filip Krajinović	(Spain) Carlos Gómez-Herrera (Spain) Jaume Munar (Japan) Taro Daniel (Spain) Roberto Carballés Baena
September 4	Open Bogotá; Bogotá, Colombia; Clay – $50,000+H – 32S/32Q/16D; Singles – Doubles	(El Salvador) Marcelo Arévalo; 7–5, 6–4	(Colombia) Daniel Elahi Galán	(Dominican Republic) Víctor Estrella Burgos (Argentina) Agustín Velotti	(Argentina) Juan Ignacio Londero (Austria) Gerald Melzer (Slovakia) Andrej Martin (Colombia) Juan Sebastián Gómez
September 4	Open Bogotá; Bogotá, Colombia; Clay – $50,000+H – 32S/32Q/16D; Singles – Doubles	(El Salvador) Marcelo Arévalo (Mexico) Miguel Ángel Reyes-Varela; 6–3, 3–6, [10–6]	(Croatia) Nikola Mektić (Croatia) Franko Škugor	(Dominican Republic) Víctor Estrella Burgos (Argentina) Agustín Velotti	(Argentina) Juan Ignacio Londero (Austria) Gerald Melzer (Slovakia) Andrej Martin (Colombia) Juan Sebastián Gómez
September 4	TEAN International; Alphen aan den Rijn, Netherlands; Clay – €43,000+H – 32S/32Q/16D; Singles – Doubles	(Estonia) Jürgen Zopp; 6–3, 6–2	(Spain) Tommy Robredo	(Germany) Oscar Otte (Netherlands) Tallon Griekspoor	(Poland) Kamil Majchrzak (Germany) Yannick Maden (Belgium) Julien Cagnina (Germany) Kevin Krawietz
September 4	TEAN International; Alphen aan den Rijn, Netherlands; Clay – €43,000+H – 32S/32Q/16D; Singles – Doubles	(Netherlands) Botic van de Zandschulp (Netherlands) Boy Westerhof; 7–6^{(8–6)}, 7–5	(Bulgaria) Alexandar Lazov (Ukraine) Volodymyr Uzhylovskyi	(Germany) Oscar Otte (Netherlands) Tallon Griekspoor	(Poland) Kamil Majchrzak (Germany) Yannick Maden (Belgium) Julien Cagnina (Germany) Kevin Krawietz
September 4	International Challenger Zhangjiagang; Zhangjiagang, China; Hard – $50,000+H – 32S/32Q/16D; Singles – Doubles	(Chinese Taipei) Jason Jung; 6–4, 2–6, 6–4	(China) Zhang Ze	(Japan) Hiroki Moriya (Japan) Go Soeda	(Egypt) Mohamed Safwat (Japan) Yasutaka Uchiyama (China) Wu Di (Japan) Yusuke Takahashi
September 4	International Challenger Zhangjiagang; Zhangjiagang, China; Hard – $50,000+H – 32S/32Q/16D; Singles – Doubles	(China) Gao Xin (China) Zhang Zhizhen; 6–2, 6–3	(Chinese Taipei) Chen Ti (Chinese Taipei) Yi Chu-huan	(Japan) Hiroki Moriya (Japan) Go Soeda	(Egypt) Mohamed Safwat (Japan) Yasutaka Uchiyama (China) Wu Di (Japan) Yusuke Takahashi
September 11	Pekao Szczecin Open; Szczecin, Poland; Clay – €127,000+H – 32S/32Q/16D; Singles – Doubles	(France) Richard Gasquet; 7–6^{(7–3)}, 7–6^{(7–4)}	(Germany) Florian Mayer	(Japan) Taro Daniel (Estonia) Jürgen Zopp	(Argentina) Guido Andreozzi (United States) Bjorn Fratangelo (Germany) Dustin Brown (Poland) Jerzy Janowicz
September 11	Pekao Szczecin Open; Szczecin, Poland; Clay – €127,000+H – 32S/32Q/16D; Singles – Doubles	(Netherlands) Wesley Koolhof (New Zealand) Artem Sitak; 6–1, 7–5	(Belarus) Aliaksandr Bury (Sweden) Andreas Siljeström	(Japan) Taro Daniel (Estonia) Jürgen Zopp	(Argentina) Guido Andreozzi (United States) Bjorn Fratangelo (Germany) Dustin Brown (Poland) Jerzy Janowicz
September 11	Amex-Istanbul Challenger; Istanbul, Turkey; Hard – $75,000+H – 32S/32Q/16D; Singles – Doubles	(Tunisia) Malek Jaziri; 7–6^{(7–4)}, 0–6, 7–5	(Italy) Matteo Berrettini	(Egypt) Karim-Mohamed Maamoun (Kazakhstan) Alexander Bublik	(Turkey) Marsel İlhan (Turkey) Altuğ Çelikbilek (Russia) Evgeny Donskoy (Uzbekistan) Denis Istomin
September 11	Amex-Istanbul Challenger; Istanbul, Turkey; Hard – $75,000+H – 32S/32Q/16D; Singles – Doubles	(Germany) Andre Begemann (France) Jonathan Eysseric; 6–3, 5–7, [10–4]	(Monaco) Romain Arneodo (France) Hugo Nys	(Egypt) Karim-Mohamed Maamoun (Kazakhstan) Alexander Bublik	(Turkey) Marsel İlhan (Turkey) Altuğ Çelikbilek (Russia) Evgeny Donskoy (Uzbekistan) Denis Istomin
September 11	Shanghai Challenger; Shanghai, China; Hard – $75,000 – 32S/32Q/16D; Singles – Doubles	(China) Wu Yibing; 7–6^{(8–6)}, 0–0 ret.	(Chinese Taipei) Lu Yen-hsun	(China) Zhang Ze (Germany) Matthias Bachinger	(Egypt) Mohamed Safwat (Australia) Dayne Kelly (Australia) Omar Jasika (Japan) Hiroki Moriya
September 11	Shanghai Challenger; Shanghai, China; Hard – $75,000 – 32S/32Q/16D; Singles – Doubles	(Japan) Toshihide Matsui (Chinese Taipei) Yi Chu-huan; 6–7^{(1–7)}, 6–4, [10–5]	(United States) Bradley Klahn (Canada) Peter Polansky	(China) Zhang Ze (Germany) Matthias Bachinger	(Egypt) Mohamed Safwat (Australia) Dayne Kelly (Australia) Omar Jasika (Japan) Hiroki Moriya
September 11	Banja Luka Challenger; Banja Luka, Bosnia and Herzegovina; Clay – €43,000+H – 32S/32Q/16D; Singles – Doubles	(Germany) Maximilian Marterer; 6–1, 6–2	(Spain) Carlos Taberner	(Italy) Andrea Arnaboldi (Spain) Pol Toledo Bagué	(Canada) Félix Auger-Aliassime (Czech Republic) Zdeněk Kolář (Serbia) Nikola Milojević (Slovakia) Filip Horanský
September 11	Banja Luka Challenger; Banja Luka, Bosnia and Herzegovina; Clay – €43,000+H – 32S/32Q/16D; Singles – Doubles	(Croatia) Marin Draganja (Croatia) Tomislav Draganja; 6–4, 6–2	(Serbia) Danilo Petrović (Serbia) Ilija Vučić	(Italy) Andrea Arnaboldi (Spain) Pol Toledo Bagué	(Canada) Félix Auger-Aliassime (Czech Republic) Zdeněk Kolář (Serbia) Nikola Milojević (Slovakia) Filip Horanský
September 11	Cary Challenger; Cary, United States; Hard – $50,000+H – 32S/32Q/14D; Singles – Doubles	(United States) Kevin King; 6–4, 6–1	(United Kingdom) Cameron Norrie	(United States) Noah Rubin (El Salvador) Marcelo Arévalo	(Argentina) Facundo Mena (Chile) Cristian Garín (United States) Mitchell Krueger (United States) Mackenzie McDonald
September 11	Cary Challenger; Cary, United States; Hard – $50,000+H – 32S/32Q/14D; Singles – Doubles	(El Salvador) Marcelo Arévalo (Mexico) Miguel Ángel Reyes-Varela; 6–7^{(6–8)}, 7–6^{(7–1)}, [10–6]	(Latvia) Miķelis Lībietis (United States) Dennis Novikov	(United States) Noah Rubin (El Salvador) Marcelo Arévalo	(Argentina) Facundo Mena (Chile) Cristian Garín (United States) Mitchell Krueger (United States) Mackenzie McDonald
September 18	Türk Telecom İzmir Cup; İzmir, Turkey; Hard – €64,000 – 32S/32Q/15D; Singles – Doubles	(Ukraine) Illya Marchenko; 7–6^{(7–2)}, 6–0	(France) Stéphane Robert	(Kazakhstan) Aleksandr Nedovyesov (Serbia) Danilo Petrović	(Austria) Lucas Miedler (France) Sadio Doumbia (Italy) Matteo Berrettini (Kazakhstan) Alexander Bublik
September 18	Türk Telecom İzmir Cup; İzmir, Turkey; Hard – €64,000 – 32S/32Q/15D; Singles – Doubles	(United Kingdom) Scott Clayton (United Kingdom) Jonny O'Mara; Walkover	(Ukraine) Denys Molchanov (Ukraine) Sergiy Stakhovsky	(Kazakhstan) Aleksandr Nedovyesov (Serbia) Danilo Petrović	(Austria) Lucas Miedler (France) Sadio Doumbia (Italy) Matteo Berrettini (Kazakhstan) Alexander Bublik
September 18	Columbus Challenger; Columbus, United States; Hard (i) – $75,000 – 32S/32Q/16D; Singles – Doubles	(Croatia) Ante Pavić; 6–7^{(11–13)}, 6–4, 6–3	(United Kingdom) Alexander Ward	(United States) Dennis Novikov (Canada) Frank Dancevic	(France) Quentin Halys (United States) Denis Kudla (United States) Evan King (Canada) Filip Peliwo
September 18	Columbus Challenger; Columbus, United States; Hard (i) – $75,000 – 32S/32Q/16D; Singles – Doubles	(Germany) Dominik Köpfer (United States) Denis Kudla; 7–6^{(8–6)}, 7–6^{(7–3)}	(United Kingdom) Luke Bambridge (Republic of Ireland) David O'Hare	(United States) Dennis Novikov (Canada) Frank Dancevic	(France) Quentin Halys (United States) Denis Kudla (United States) Evan King (Canada) Filip Peliwo
September 18	Gwangju Open; Gwangju, South Korea; Hard – $50,000+H – 32S/32Q/14D; Singles – Doubles	(Germany) Matthias Bachinger; 6–3, 6–4	(Chinese Taipei) Yang Tsung-hua	(Japan) Tatsuma Ito (Canada) Peter Polansky	(Canada) Steven Diez (South Korea) Lee Duck-hee (Australia) Marinko Matosevic (South Korea) Kwon Soon-woo
September 18	Gwangju Open; Gwangju, South Korea; Hard – $50,000+H – 32S/32Q/14D; Singles – Doubles	(Chinese Taipei) Chen Ti (Japan) Ben McLachlan; 2–6, 7–6^{(7–1)}, [10–1]	(Australia) Jarryd Chaplin (Australia) Luke Saville	(Japan) Tatsuma Ito (Canada) Peter Polansky	(Canada) Steven Diez (South Korea) Lee Duck-hee (Australia) Marinko Matosevic (South Korea) Kwon Soon-woo
September 18	Sibiu Open; Sibiu, Romania; Clay – €43,000+H – 32S/32Q/16D; Singles – Doubles	(Germany) Cedrik-Marcel Stebe; 6–3, 6–3	(Spain) Carlos Taberner	(Germany) Maximilian Marterer (Romania) Adrian Ungur	(Italy) Stefano Napolitano (Norway) Casper Ruud (Italy) Stefano Travaglia (United States) Bjorn Fratangelo
September 18	Sibiu Open; Sibiu, Romania; Clay – €43,000+H – 32S/32Q/16D; Singles – Doubles	(Italy) Marco Cecchinato (Italy) Matteo Donati; 6–3, 6–1	(Belgium) Sander Gillé (Belgium) Joran Vliegen	(Germany) Maximilian Marterer (Romania) Adrian Ungur	(Italy) Stefano Napolitano (Norway) Casper Ruud (Italy) Stefano Travaglia (United States) Bjorn Fratangelo
September 25	Open d'Orléans; Orléans, France; Hard (i) – €127,000+H – 32S/32Q/16D; Singles – Doubles	(Slovakia) Norbert Gombos; 6–3, 5–7, 6–2	(France) Julien Benneteau	(Hungary) Márton Fucsovics (Ukraine) Illya Marchenko	(Argentina) Horacio Zeballos (France) Paul-Henri Mathieu (Russia) Andrey Kuznetsov (France) Nicolas Mahut
September 25	Open d'Orléans; Orléans, France; Hard (i) – €127,000+H – 32S/32Q/16D; Singles – Doubles	(Argentina) Guillermo Durán (Argentina) Andrés Molteni; 6–3, 6–7^{(4–7)}, [13–11]	(France) Jonathan Eysseric (France) Tristan Lamasine	(Hungary) Márton Fucsovics (Ukraine) Illya Marchenko	(Argentina) Horacio Zeballos (France) Paul-Henri Mathieu (Russia) Andrey Kuznetsov (France) Nicolas Mahut
September 25	Tiburon Challenger; Tiburon, United States; Hard – $100,000 – 32S/32Q/16D; Singles – Doubles	(United Kingdom) Cameron Norrie; 6–2, 6–3	(United States) Tennys Sandgren	(India) Prajnesh Gunneswaran (United States) Mackenzie McDonald	(Canada) Frank Dancevic (United States) Michael Mmoh (Colombia) Alejandro González (United States) Christian Harrison
September 25	Tiburon Challenger; Tiburon, United States; Hard – $100,000 – 32S/32Q/16D; Singles – Doubles	(Sweden) André Göransson (France) Florian Lakat; 6–4, 6–4	(El Salvador) Marcelo Arévalo (Mexico) Miguel Ángel Reyes-Varela	(India) Prajnesh Gunneswaran (United States) Mackenzie McDonald	(Canada) Frank Dancevic (United States) Michael Mmoh (Colombia) Alejandro González (United States) Christian Harrison
September 25	BFD Energy Challenger; Rome, Italy; Clay – €43,000+H – 32S/32Q/16D; Singles – Doubles	(Serbia) Filip Krajinović; 6–4, 6–3	(Spain) Daniel Gimeno Traver	(Spain) Carlos Taberner (Spain) Roberto Carballés Baena	(Argentina) Patricio Heras (Spain) Guillermo García López (Spain) Ricardo Ojeda Lara (Serbia) Laslo Đere
September 25	BFD Energy Challenger; Rome, Italy; Clay – €43,000+H – 32S/32Q/16D; Singles – Doubles	(Slovakia) Martin Kližan (Slovakia) Jozef Kovalík; 6–3, 7–6^{(7–5)}	(Belgium) Sander Gillé (Belgium) Joran Vliegen	(Spain) Carlos Taberner (Spain) Roberto Carballés Baena	(Argentina) Patricio Heras (Spain) Guillermo García López (Spain) Ricardo Ojeda Lara (Serbia) Laslo Đere

=== October ===
Week of	Tournament	Champions	Runners-up	Semifinalists	Quarterfinalists
October 2	OEC Kaohsiung; Kaohsiung, Taiwan; Carpet (i) – $125,000+H – 32S/32Q/16D; Singles – Doubles	(Russia) Evgeny Donskoy; 7–6^{(7–0)}, 7–5	(Romania) Marius Copil	(Australia) Marinko Matosevic (South Africa) Lloyd Harris	(Germany) Andre Begemann (Czech Republic) Lukáš Rosol (Slovakia) Lukáš Lacko (Australia) John Millman
October 2	OEC Kaohsiung; Kaohsiung, Taiwan; Carpet (i) – $125,000+H – 32S/32Q/16D; Singles – Doubles	(Thailand) Sanchai Ratiwatana (Thailand) Sonchat Ratiwatana; 6–4, 1–6, [10–6]	(Israel) Jonathan Erlich (Austria) Alexander Peya	(Australia) Marinko Matosevic (South Africa) Lloyd Harris	(Germany) Andre Begemann (Czech Republic) Lukáš Rosol (Slovakia) Lukáš Lacko (Australia) John Millman
October 2	Monterrey Challenger; Monterrey, Mexico; Hard – $100,000+H – 32S/32Q/16D; Singles – Doubles	(Germany) Maximilian Marterer; 7–6^{(7–3)}, 7–6^{(8–6)}	(United States) Bradley Klahn	(France) Quentin Halys (United States) Kevin King	(Dominican Republic) Víctor Estrella Burgos (Chile) Cristian Garín (Germany) Dominik Köpfer (United States) Evan King
October 2	Monterrey Challenger; Monterrey, Mexico; Hard – $100,000+H – 32S/32Q/16D; Singles – Doubles	(United States) Christopher Eubanks (United States) Evan King; 7–6^{(7–4)}, 6–3	(El Salvador) Marcelo Arévalo (Mexico) Miguel Ángel Reyes-Varela	(France) Quentin Halys (United States) Kevin King	(Dominican Republic) Víctor Estrella Burgos (Chile) Cristian Garín (Germany) Dominik Köpfer (United States) Evan King
October 2	Stockton ATP Challenger; Stockton, United States; Hard – $100,000 – 32S/32Q/16D; Singles – Doubles	(United Kingdom) Cameron Norrie; 6–1, 6–3	(Barbados) Darian King	(United States) Tim Smyczek (United States) Michael Mmoh	(Sweden) Elias Ymer (United States) Stefan Kozlov (Russia) Dmitry Tursunov (United States) Tennys Sandgren
October 2	Stockton ATP Challenger; Stockton, United States; Hard – $100,000 – 32S/32Q/16D; Singles – Doubles	(United Kingdom) Brydan Klein (United Kingdom) Joe Salisbury; 6–2, 6–4	(United States) Denis Kudla (Latvia) Miķelis Lībietis	(United States) Tim Smyczek (United States) Michael Mmoh	(Sweden) Elias Ymer (United States) Stefan Kozlov (Russia) Dmitry Tursunov (United States) Tennys Sandgren
October 2	Almaty Challenger; Almaty, Kazakhstan; Clay – $50,000+H – 32S/32Q/16D; Singles – Doubles	(Serbia) Filip Krajinović; 6–0, 6–3	(Serbia) Laslo Đere	(Russia) Ivan Gakhov (Argentina) Marco Trungelliti	(Belgium) Arthur De Greef (Spain) Guillermo García López (Russia) Ivan Nedelko (Italy) Federico Gaio
October 2	Almaty Challenger; Almaty, Kazakhstan; Clay – $50,000+H – 32S/32Q/16D; Singles – Doubles	(Kazakhstan) Timur Khabibulin (Kazakhstan) Aleksandr Nedovyesov; 1–6, 6–3, [10–3]	(Russia) Ivan Gakhov (Croatia) Nino Serdarušić	(Russia) Ivan Gakhov (Argentina) Marco Trungelliti	(Belgium) Arthur De Greef (Spain) Guillermo García López (Russia) Ivan Nedelko (Italy) Federico Gaio
October 2	São Paulo Challenger de Tênis; Campinas, Brazil; Clay – $50,000+H – 32S/32Q/16D; Singles – Doubles	(Portugal) Gastão Elias; 3–6, 6–3, 6–4	(Argentina) Renzo Olivo	(Argentina) Andrea Collarini (Portugal) Gonçalo Oliveira	(Austria) Michael Linzer (Spain) Daniel Muñoz de la Nava (Brazil) José Pereira (Brazil) André Ghem
October 2	São Paulo Challenger de Tênis; Campinas, Brazil; Clay – $50,000+H – 32S/32Q/16D; Singles – Doubles	(Argentina) Máximo González (Brazil) Fabrício Neis; 6–1, 6–1	(Portugal) Gastão Elias (Brazil) José Pereira	(Argentina) Andrea Collarini (Portugal) Gonçalo Oliveira	(Austria) Michael Linzer (Spain) Daniel Muñoz de la Nava (Brazil) José Pereira (Brazil) André Ghem
October 9	Tashkent Challenger; Tashkent, Uzbekistan; Hard – $150,000+H – 32S/32Q/16D; Singles – Doubles	(Spain) Guillermo García López; 6–1, 7–6^{(7–1)}	(Poland) Kamil Majchrzak	(Uzbekistan) Denis Istomin (Czech Republic) Marek Jaloviec	(Belarus) Uladzimir Ignatik (Czech Republic) Václav Šafránek (France) Gleb Sakharov (Egypt) Mohamed Safwat
October 9	Tashkent Challenger; Tashkent, Uzbekistan; Hard – $150,000+H – 32S/32Q/16D; Singles – Doubles	(Chile) Hans Podlipnik Castillo (Belarus) Andrei Vasilevski; 6–4, 6–2	(India) Yuki Bhambri (India) Divij Sharan	(Uzbekistan) Denis Istomin (Czech Republic) Marek Jaloviec	(Belarus) Uladzimir Ignatik (Czech Republic) Václav Šafránek (France) Gleb Sakharov (Egypt) Mohamed Safwat
October 9	Fairfield Challenger; Fairfield, United States; Hard – $100,000 – 32S/32Q/16D; Singles – Doubles	(United States) Mackenzie McDonald; 6–4, 6–2	(United States) Bradley Klahn	(Germany) Maximilian Marterer (Australia) Christopher O'Connell	(Serbia) Nikola Milojević (Germany) Sebastian Fanselow (United States) Bjorn Fratangelo (United States) Tennys Sandgren
October 9	Fairfield Challenger; Fairfield, United States; Hard – $100,000 – 32S/32Q/16D; Singles – Doubles	(United Kingdom) Luke Bambridge (Republic of Ireland) David O'Hare; 6–4, 6–2	(Egypt) Akram El Sallaly (Brazil) Bernardo Oliveira	(Germany) Maximilian Marterer (Australia) Christopher O'Connell	(Serbia) Nikola Milojević (Germany) Sebastian Fanselow (United States) Bjorn Fratangelo (United States) Tennys Sandgren
October 9	Sparkassen ATP Challenger; Ortisei, Italy; Hard (i) – €64,000 – 32S/32Q/16D; Singles – Doubles	(Italy) Lorenzo Sonego; 6–4, 6–4	(Germany) Tim Pütz	(France) Pierre-Hugues Herbert (Italy) Matteo Donati	(Croatia) Viktor Galović (Germany) Marc Sieber (Italy) Andreas Seppi (Germany) Oscar Otte
October 9	Sparkassen ATP Challenger; Ortisei, Italy; Hard (i) – €64,000 – 32S/32Q/16D; Singles – Doubles	(Netherlands) Sander Arends (Croatia) Antonio Šančić; 6–2, 5–7, [13–11]	(Germany) Jeremy Jahn (Israel) Edan Leshem	(France) Pierre-Hugues Herbert (Italy) Matteo Donati	(Croatia) Viktor Galović (Germany) Marc Sieber (Italy) Andreas Seppi (Germany) Oscar Otte
October 9	Copa Fila; Buenos Aires, Argentina; Clay – $50,000+H – 32S/32Q/16D; Singles – Doubles	(Argentina) Nicolás Kicker; 6–7^{(5–7)}, 6–0, 7–5	(Argentina) Horacio Zeballos	(Austria) Gerald Melzer (Portugal) Gastão Elias	(Argentina) Renzo Olivo (Portugal) João Domingues (Argentina) Federico Coria (Argentina) Federico Delbonis
October 9	Copa Fila; Buenos Aires, Argentina; Clay – $50,000+H – 32S/32Q/16D; Singles – Doubles	(Uruguay) Ariel Behar (Brazil) Fabiano de Paula; 7–6^{(7–3)}, 5–7, [10–8]	(Argentina) Máximo González (Brazil) Fabrício Neis	(Austria) Gerald Melzer (Portugal) Gastão Elias	(Argentina) Renzo Olivo (Portugal) João Domingues (Argentina) Federico Coria (Argentina) Federico Delbonis
October 16	Ningbo Challenger; Ningbo, China; Hard – $125,000 – 32S/32Q/16D; Singles – Doubles	(Russia) Mikhail Youzhny; 6–1, 6–1	(Japan) Taro Daniel	(Chinese Taipei) Lu Yen-hsun (Austria) Jurij Rodionov	(Canada) Peter Polansky (Japan) Yosuke Watanuki (China) Li Zhe (Australia) Jordan Thompson
October 16	Ningbo Challenger; Ningbo, China; Hard – $125,000 – 32S/32Q/16D; Singles – Doubles	(Moldova) Radu Albot (New Zealand) Rubin Statham; 7–5, 6–3	(India) Jeevan Nedunchezhiyan (Indonesia) Christopher Rungkat	(Chinese Taipei) Lu Yen-hsun (Austria) Jurij Rodionov	(Canada) Peter Polansky (Japan) Yosuke Watanuki (China) Li Zhe (Australia) Jordan Thompson
October 16	Las Vegas Challenger; Las Vegas, United States; Hard – $50,000+H – 32S/32Q/15D; Singles – Doubles	(United States) Stefan Kozlov; 3–6, 7–5, 6–4	(United Kingdom) Liam Broady	(United States) Tennys Sandgren (United States) Evan King	(Germany) Jan Choinski (United States) Kevin King (United States) Bradley Klahn (United States) Reilly Opelka
October 16	Las Vegas Challenger; Las Vegas, United States; Hard – $50,000+H – 32S/32Q/15D; Singles – Doubles	(United Kingdom) Brydan Klein (United Kingdom) Joe Salisbury; 6–3, 4–6, [10–3]	(Mexico) Hans Hach Verdugo (United States) Dennis Novikov	(United States) Tennys Sandgren (United States) Evan King	(Germany) Jan Choinski (United States) Kevin King (United States) Bradley Klahn (United States) Reilly Opelka
October 16	Wolffkran Open; Ismaning, Germany; Carpet (i) – €43,000+H – 32S/32Q/16D; Singles – Doubles	(Germany) Yannick Hanfmann; 6–4, 3–6, 7–5	(Italy) Lorenzo Sonego	(Italy) Matteo Donati (Germany) Dustin Brown	(Italy) Salvatore Caruso (Germany) Daniel Masur (France) Tristan Lamasine (Poland) Hubert Hurkacz
October 16	Wolffkran Open; Ismaning, Germany; Carpet (i) – €43,000+H – 32S/32Q/16D; Singles – Doubles	(Croatia) Marin Draganja (Croatia) Tomislav Draganja; 6–7^{(1–7)}, 6–2, [10–8]	(Germany) Dustin Brown (Germany) Tim Pütz	(Italy) Matteo Donati (Germany) Dustin Brown	(Italy) Salvatore Caruso (Germany) Daniel Masur (France) Tristan Lamasine (Poland) Hubert Hurkacz
October 16	Milo Open Cali; Cali, Colombia; Clay – $50,000+H – 32S/32Q/16D; Singles – Doubles	(Argentina) Federico Delbonis; 7–6^{(12–10)}, 7–5	(Brazil) Guilherme Clezar	(Slovakia) Andrej Martin (Austria) Gerald Melzer	(Spain) Jaume Munar (Colombia) Alejandro González (Spain) Roberto Carballés Baena (Slovenia) Blaž Rola
October 16	Milo Open Cali; Cali, Colombia; Clay – $50,000+H – 32S/32Q/16D; Singles – Doubles	(El Salvador) Marcelo Arévalo (Mexico) Miguel Ángel Reyes-Varela; 6–3, 6–4	(Peru) Sergio Galdós (Brazil) Fabrício Neis	(Slovakia) Andrej Martin (Austria) Gerald Melzer	(Spain) Jaume Munar (Colombia) Alejandro González (Spain) Roberto Carballés Baena (Slovenia) Blaž Rola
October 23	Brest Challenger; Brest, France; Hard (i) – €106,000+H – 32S/32Q/16D; Singles – Doubles	(France) Corentin Moutet; 6–2, 7–6^{(10–8)}	(Greece) Stefanos Tsitsipas	(Germany) Yannick Maden (Romania) Marius Copil	(Russia) Daniil Medvedev (France) Gleb Sakharov (France) Jérémy Chardy (France) Ugo Humbert
October 23	Brest Challenger; Brest, France; Hard (i) – €106,000+H – 32S/32Q/16D; Singles – Doubles	(Netherlands) Sander Arends (Croatia) Antonio Šančić; 6–4, 7–5	(United Kingdom) Scott Clayton (India) Divij Sharan	(Germany) Yannick Maden (Romania) Marius Copil	(Russia) Daniil Medvedev (France) Gleb Sakharov (France) Jérémy Chardy (France) Ugo Humbert
October 23	China International Suzhou; Suzhou, China; Hard – $75,000 – 32S/32Q/16D; Singles – Doubles	(Serbia) Miomir Kecmanović; 6–4, 6–4	(Moldova) Radu Albot	(China) Zhang Ze (Slovenia) Blaž Kavčič	(China) Wu Di (Brazil) Thiago Monteiro (Spain) Adrián Menéndez Maceiras (Poland) Hubert Hurkacz
October 23	China International Suzhou; Suzhou, China; Hard – $75,000 – 32S/32Q/16D; Singles – Doubles	(China) Gao Xin (China) Sun Fajing; 7–6^{(7–5)}, 4–6, [10–7]	(China) Gong Maoxin (China) Zhang Ze	(China) Zhang Ze (Slovenia) Blaž Kavčič	(China) Wu Di (Brazil) Thiago Monteiro (Spain) Adrián Menéndez Maceiras (Poland) Hubert Hurkacz
October 23	Lima Challenger; Lima, Peru; Clay – $50,000+H – 32S/32Q/16D; Singles – Doubles	(Austria) Gerald Melzer; 7–5, 7–6^{(7–4)}	(Slovakia) Jozef Kovalík	(Italy) Marco Cecchinato (Argentina) Nicolás Kicker	(Slovakia) Andrej Martin (Bulgaria) Dimitar Kuzmanov (Portugal) Gastão Elias (Argentina) Facundo Bagnis
October 23	Lima Challenger; Lima, Peru; Clay – $50,000+H – 32S/32Q/16D; Singles – Doubles	(Mexico) Miguel Ángel Reyes-Varela (Slovenia) Blaž Rola; 7–5, 6–3	(Portugal) Gonçalo Oliveira (Poland) Grzegorz Panfil	(Italy) Marco Cecchinato (Argentina) Nicolás Kicker	(Slovakia) Andrej Martin (Bulgaria) Dimitar Kuzmanov (Portugal) Gastão Elias (Argentina) Facundo Bagnis
October 23	Latrobe City Traralgon ATP Challenger; Traralgon, Australia; Hard – $75,000 – 32S/32Q/16D; Singles – Doubles	(Australia) Jason Kubler; 2–6, 7–6^{(8–6)}, 7–6^{(7–3)}	(Australia) Alex Bolt	(Australia) Maverick Banes (Australia) Matthew Ebden	(United States) Evan King (United States) Alexander Sarkissian (Australia) Bradley Mousley (United States) Noah Rubin
October 23	Latrobe City Traralgon ATP Challenger; Traralgon, Australia; Hard – $75,000 – 32S/32Q/16D; Singles – Doubles	(Australia) Alex Bolt (Australia) Bradley Mousley; 6–4, 6–2	(United States) Evan King (United States) Nathan Pasha	(Australia) Maverick Banes (Australia) Matthew Ebden	(United States) Evan King (United States) Alexander Sarkissian (Australia) Bradley Mousley (United States) Noah Rubin
October 23	Vietnam Open; Ho Chi Minh City, Vietnam; Hard – $50,000+H – 32S/32Q/16D; Singles – Doubles	(Russia) Mikhail Youzhny; 6–4, 6–4	(Australia) John Millman	(Japan) Go Soeda (Australia) Akira Santillan	(United States) Taylor Fritz (India) Yuki Bhambri (Canada) Peter Polansky (Chinese Taipei) Jason Jung
October 23	Vietnam Open; Ho Chi Minh City, Vietnam; Hard – $50,000+H – 32S/32Q/16D; Singles – Doubles	(India) Saketh Myneni (India) Vijay Sundar Prashanth; 7–6^{(7–3)}, 7–6^{(7–5)}	(Japan) Ben McLachlan (Japan) Go Soeda	(Japan) Go Soeda (Australia) Akira Santillan	(United States) Taylor Fritz (India) Yuki Bhambri (Canada) Peter Polansky (Chinese Taipei) Jason Jung
October 30	Shenzhen Longhua Open; Shenzhen, China; Hard – $75,000+H – 32S/32Q/16D; Singles – Doubles	(Moldova) Radu Albot; 7–6^{(8–6)}, 6–7^{(3–7)}, 6–4	(Poland) Hubert Hurkacz	(Russia) Mikhail Youzhny (Slovenia) Blaž Kavčič	(United States) Austin Krajicek (Chinese Taipei) Jason Jung (South Korea) Kwon Soon-woo (China) Wu Yibing
October 30	Shenzhen Longhua Open; Shenzhen, China; Hard – $75,000+H – 32S/32Q/16D; Singles – Doubles	(India) Sriram Balaji (India) Vishnu Vardhan; 7–6^{(7–3)}, 7–6^{(7–3)}	(United States) Austin Krajicek (United States) Jackson Withrow	(Russia) Mikhail Youzhny (Slovenia) Blaž Kavčič	(United States) Austin Krajicek (Chinese Taipei) Jason Jung (South Korea) Kwon Soon-woo (China) Wu Yibing
October 30	Charlottesville Men's Pro Challenger; Charlottesville, United States; Hard (i) – $75,000 – 32S/32Q/16D; Singles – Doubles	(United States) Tim Smyczek; 6–7^{(5–7)}, 6–3, 6–2	(United States) Tennys Sandgren	(United States) Michael Mmoh (United States) Stefan Kozlov	(Canada) Brayden Schnur (South Africa) Ruan Roelofse (United States) Denis Kudla (Switzerland) Henri Laaksonen
October 30	Charlottesville Men's Pro Challenger; Charlottesville, United States; Hard (i) – $75,000 – 32S/32Q/16D; Singles – Doubles	(United States) Denis Kudla (United States) Danny Thomas; 6–7^{(4–7)}, 1–4 ret.	(Australia) Jarryd Chaplin (Latvia) Miķelis Lībietis	(United States) Michael Mmoh (United States) Stefan Kozlov	(Canada) Brayden Schnur (South Africa) Ruan Roelofse (United States) Denis Kudla (Switzerland) Henri Laaksonen
October 30	Canberra Tennis International; Canberra, Australia; Hard – $75,000 – 32S/32Q/16D; Singles – Doubles	(Australia) Matthew Ebden; 7–6^{(7–4)}, 6–4	(Japan) Taro Daniel	(Australia) Marc Polmans (Australia) Alex Bolt	(United States) Alexander Sarkissian (Australia) Blake Ellis (Australia) Gavin van Peperzeel (Australia) Omar Jasika
October 30	Canberra Tennis International; Canberra, Australia; Hard – $75,000 – 32S/32Q/16D; Singles – Doubles	(Australia) Alex Bolt (Australia) Bradley Mousley; 6–3, 6–2	(Australia) Luke Saville (Australia) Andrew Whittington	(Australia) Marc Polmans (Australia) Alex Bolt	(United States) Alexander Sarkissian (Australia) Blake Ellis (Australia) Gavin van Peperzeel (Australia) Omar Jasika
October 30	Challenger Ciudad de Guayaquil; Guayaquil, Ecuador; Clay – $50,000+H – 32S/32Q/16D; Singles – Doubles	(Austria) Gerald Melzer; 6–3, 6–1	(Argentina) Facundo Bagnis	(Bolivia) Hugo Dellien (Portugal) Gastão Elias	(El Salvador) Marcelo Arévalo (Ecuador) Roberto Quiroz (Argentina) Guido Andreozzi (Argentina) Nicolás Kicker
October 30	Challenger Ciudad de Guayaquil; Guayaquil, Ecuador; Clay – $50,000+H – 32S/32Q/16D; Singles – Doubles	(El Salvador) Marcelo Arévalo (Mexico) Miguel Ángel Reyes-Varela; 6–1, 6–7^{(7–9)}, [10–6]	(Bolivia) Hugo Dellien (Bolivia) Federico Zeballos	(Bolivia) Hugo Dellien (Portugal) Gastão Elias	(El Salvador) Marcelo Arévalo (Ecuador) Roberto Quiroz (Argentina) Guido Andreozzi (Argentina) Nicolás Kicker
October 30	Bauer Watertechnology Cup; Eckental, Germany; Carpet (i) – €43,000+H – 32S/32Q/16D; Singles – Doubles	(Germany) Maximilian Marterer; 7–6^{(10–8)}, 3–6, 6–3	(Poland) Jerzy Janowicz	(Germany) Matthias Bachinger (Austria) Sebastian Ofner	(Belgium) Ruben Bemelmans (Australia) Alex de Minaur (Bosnia and Herzegovina) Mirza Bašić (France) Corentin Moutet
October 30	Bauer Watertechnology Cup; Eckental, Germany; Carpet (i) – €43,000+H – 32S/32Q/16D; Singles – Doubles	(Netherlands) Sander Arends (Czech Republic) Roman Jebavý; 6–2, 6–4	(United Kingdom) Ken Skupski (United Kingdom) Neal Skupski	(Germany) Matthias Bachinger (Austria) Sebastian Ofner	(Belgium) Ruben Bemelmans (Australia) Alex de Minaur (Bosnia and Herzegovina) Mirza Bašić (France) Corentin Moutet

=== November ===
Week of	Tournament	Champions	Runners-up	Semifinalists	Quarterfinalists
November 6	Slovak Open; Bratislava, Slovakia; Hard (i) – €106,000+H – 32S/32Q/16D; Singles – Doubles	(Slovakia) Lukáš Lacko; 6–4, 7–6^{(7–4)}	(Romania) Marius Copil	(Kazakhstan) Mikhail Kukushkin (Estonia) Jürgen Zopp	(Poland) Jerzy Janowicz (Poland) Kamil Majchrzak (Italy) Andreas Seppi (Croatia) Franko Škugor
November 6	Slovak Open; Bratislava, Slovakia; Hard (i) – €106,000+H – 32S/32Q/16D; Singles – Doubles	(United Kingdom) Ken Skupski (United Kingdom) Neal Skupski; 5–7, 6–3, [10–8]	(Netherlands) Sander Arends (Croatia) Antonio Šančić	(Kazakhstan) Mikhail Kukushkin (Estonia) Jürgen Zopp	(Poland) Jerzy Janowicz (Poland) Kamil Majchrzak (Italy) Andreas Seppi (Croatia) Franko Škugor
November 6	Internationaux de Tennis de Vendée; Mouilleron-le-Captif, France; Hard (i) – €85,000+H – 32S/32Q/16D; Singles – Doubles	(Sweden) Elias Ymer; 7–5, 6–4	(Germany) Yannick Maden	(France) Gleb Sakharov (Italy) Luca Vanni	(Belarus) Ilya Ivashka (France) Constant Lestienne (Russia) Alexey Vatutin (Germany) Peter Gojowczyk
November 6	Internationaux de Tennis de Vendée; Mouilleron-le-Captif, France; Hard (i) – €85,000+H – 32S/32Q/16D; Singles – Doubles	(Germany) Andre Begemann (France) Jonathan Eysseric; 6–3, 6–4	(Poland) Tomasz Bednarek (Netherlands) David Pel	(France) Gleb Sakharov (Italy) Luca Vanni	(Belarus) Ilya Ivashka (France) Constant Lestienne (Russia) Alexey Vatutin (Germany) Peter Gojowczyk
November 6	Uruguay Open; Montevideo, Uruguay; Clay – $75,000+H – 32S/32Q/16D; Singles – Doubles	(Uruguay) Pablo Cuevas; 6–4, 6–3	(Portugal) Gastão Elias	(Argentina) Nicolás Kicker (Portugal) João Domingues	(Argentina) Facundo Bagnis (El Salvador) Marcelo Arévalo (Brazil) Rogério Dutra Silva (Argentina) Guido Pella
November 6	Uruguay Open; Montevideo, Uruguay; Clay – $75,000+H – 32S/32Q/16D; Singles – Doubles	(Monaco) Romain Arneodo (Brazil) Fernando Romboli; 2–6, 6–4, [10–8]	(Uruguay) Ariel Behar (Brazil) Fabiano de Paula	(Argentina) Nicolás Kicker (Portugal) João Domingues	(Argentina) Facundo Bagnis (El Salvador) Marcelo Arévalo (Brazil) Rogério Dutra Silva (Argentina) Guido Pella
November 6	Knoxville Challenger; Knoxville, United States; Hard (i) – $75,000 – 32S/32Q/16D; Singles – Doubles	(Canada) Filip Peliwo; 6–4, 6–2	(United States) Denis Kudla	(United States) Bradley Klahn (Switzerland) Henri Laaksonen	(United Kingdom) Edward Corrie (United States) Bjorn Fratangelo (United States) Taylor Fritz (United States) Tim Smyczek
November 6	Knoxville Challenger; Knoxville, United States; Hard (i) – $75,000 – 32S/32Q/16D; Singles – Doubles	(India) Leander Paes (India) Purav Raja; 7–6^{(7–4)}, 7–6^{(7–4)}	(United States) James Cerretani (Australia) John-Patrick Smith	(United States) Bradley Klahn (Switzerland) Henri Laaksonen	(United Kingdom) Edward Corrie (United States) Bjorn Fratangelo (United States) Taylor Fritz (United States) Tim Smyczek
November 6	Kobe Challenger; Kobe, Japan; Hard (i) – $50,000+H – 32S/32Q/16D; Singles – Doubles	(France) Stéphane Robert; 7–6^{(7–1)}, 6–7^{(5–7)}, 6–1	(France) Calvin Hemery	(South Korea) Kwon Soon-woo (Australia) Akira Santillan	(Japan) Yosuke Watanuki (Australia) John Millman (Japan) Go Soeda (Australia) Alex Bolt
November 6	Kobe Challenger; Kobe, Japan; Hard (i) – $50,000+H – 32S/32Q/16D; Singles – Doubles	(Japan) Ben McLachlan (Japan) Yasutaka Uchiyama; 4–6, 6–3, [10–8]	(India) Jeevan Nedunchezhiyan (Indonesia) Christopher Rungkat	(South Korea) Kwon Soon-woo (Australia) Akira Santillan	(Japan) Yosuke Watanuki (Australia) John Millman (Japan) Go Soeda (Australia) Alex Bolt
November 13	JSM Challenger of Champaign–Urbana; Champaign, United States; Hard (i) – $75,000 – 32S/32Q/16D; Singles – Doubles	(United States) Tim Smyczek; 6–2, 6–4	(United States) Bjorn Fratangelo	(United Kingdom) Cameron Norrie (United States) Taylor Fritz	(United States) Tennys Sandgren (United States) Mackenzie McDonald (United States) Tommy Paul (Canada) Filip Peliwo
November 13	JSM Challenger of Champaign–Urbana; Champaign, United States; Hard (i) – $75,000 – 32S/32Q/16D; Singles – Doubles	(India) Leander Paes (India) Purav Raja; 6–3, 6–7^{(5–7)}, [10–5]	(South Africa) Ruan Roelofse (United Kingdom) Joe Salisbury	(United Kingdom) Cameron Norrie (United States) Taylor Fritz	(United States) Tennys Sandgren (United States) Mackenzie McDonald (United States) Tommy Paul (Canada) Filip Peliwo
November 13	Trofeo Città di Brescia; Brescia, Italy; Carpet (i) – €43,000+H – 32S/32Q/16D; Singles – Doubles	(Slovakia) Lukáš Lacko; 6–1, 6–2	(Lithuania) Laurynas Grigelis	(Croatia) Viktor Galović (Bosnia and Herzegovina) Mirza Bašić	(Belarus) Uladzimir Ignatik (Italy) Andreas Seppi (Italy) Stefano Travaglia (Australia) Alex de Minaur
November 13	Trofeo Città di Brescia; Brescia, Italy; Carpet (i) – €43,000+H – 32S/32Q/16D; Singles – Doubles	(Netherlands) Sander Arends (Belgium) Sander Gillé; 6–2, 6–3	(Switzerland) Luca Margaroli (Austria) Tristan-Samuel Weissborn	(Croatia) Viktor Galović (Bosnia and Herzegovina) Mirza Bašić	(Belarus) Uladzimir Ignatik (Italy) Andreas Seppi (Italy) Stefano Travaglia (Australia) Alex de Minaur
November 13	Santiago Challenger; Santiago, Chile; Clay – $50,000+H – 32S/32Q/16D; Singles – Doubles	(Chile) Nicolás Jarry; 6–1, 7–5	(El Salvador) Marcelo Arévalo	(Brazil) Rogério Dutra Silva (Brazil) Thiago Monteiro	(Argentina) Patricio Heras (Portugal) Gastão Elias (Argentina) Carlos Berlocq (Colombia) Daniel Elahi Galán
November 13	Santiago Challenger; Santiago, Chile; Clay – $50,000+H – 32S/32Q/16D; Singles – Doubles	(Argentina) Franco Agamenone (Argentina) Facundo Argüello; 6–4, 3–6, [10–6]	(Argentina) Máximo González (Chile) Nicolás Jarry	(Brazil) Rogério Dutra Silva (Brazil) Thiago Monteiro	(Argentina) Patricio Heras (Portugal) Gastão Elias (Argentina) Carlos Berlocq (Colombia) Daniel Elahi Galán
November 13	KPIT MSLTA Challenger; Pune, India; Hard – $50,000+H – 32S/32Q/16D; Singles – Doubles	(India) Yuki Bhambri; 4–6, 6–3, 6–4	(India) Ramkumar Ramanathan	(India) Saketh Myneni (Spain) Adrián Menéndez Maceiras	(Slovenia) Blaž Kavčič (Serbia) Nikola Milojević (United Kingdom) Jay Clarke (Kazakhstan) Aleksandr Nedovyesov
November 13	KPIT MSLTA Challenger; Pune, India; Hard – $50,000+H – 32S/32Q/16D; Singles – Doubles	(Bosnia and Herzegovina) Tomislav Brkić (Croatia) Ante Pavić; 6–1, 7–6^{(7–5)}	(Spain) Pedro Martínez (Spain) Adrián Menéndez Maceiras	(India) Saketh Myneni (Spain) Adrián Menéndez Maceiras	(Slovenia) Blaž Kavčič (Serbia) Nikola Milojević (United Kingdom) Jay Clarke (Kazakhstan) Aleksandr Nedovyesov
November 13	Dunlop World Challenge; Toyota, Japan; Carpet (i) – $50,000+H – 32S/32Q/16D; Singles – Doubles	(Australia) Matthew Ebden; 7–6^{(7–3)}, 6–3	(France) Calvin Hemery	(Australia) John Millman (Poland) Hubert Hurkacz	(Australia) Andrew Whittington (Australia) Max Purcell (Japan) Tatsuma Ito (South Korea) Lee Duck-hee
November 13	Dunlop World Challenge; Toyota, Japan; Carpet (i) – $50,000+H – 32S/32Q/16D; Singles – Doubles	(Australia) Max Purcell (Australia) Andrew Whittington; 6–3, 2–6, [10–8]	(Philippines) Ruben Gonzales (Indonesia) Christopher Rungkat	(Australia) John Millman (Poland) Hubert Hurkacz	(Australia) Andrew Whittington (Australia) Max Purcell (Japan) Tatsuma Ito (South Korea) Lee Duck-hee
November 20	Hua Hin Championships; Hua Hin, Thailand; Hard – $150,000 – 32S/32Q/16D; Singles – Doubles	(Australia) John Millman; 6–2, 6–2	(Australia) Andrew Whittington	(Japan) Go Soeda (Japan) Tatsuma Ito	(Australia) Matthew Ebden (Israel) Edan Leshem (South Korea) Kwon Soon-woo (Russia) Alexey Vatutin
November 20	Hua Hin Championships; Hua Hin, Thailand; Hard – $150,000 – 32S/32Q/16D; Singles – Doubles	(Thailand) Sanchai Ratiwatana (Thailand) Sonchat Ratiwatana; 6–4, 5–7, [10–5]	(United States) Austin Krajicek (United States) Jackson Withrow	(Japan) Go Soeda (Japan) Tatsuma Ito	(Australia) Matthew Ebden (Israel) Edan Leshem (South Korea) Kwon Soon-woo (Russia) Alexey Vatutin
November 20	Bengaluru Open; Bangalore, India; Hard – $100,000+H – 32S/32Q/16D; Singles – Doubles	(India) Sumit Nagal; 6–3, 3–6, 6–2	(United Kingdom) Jay Clarke	(India) Yuki Bhambri (Chinese Taipei) Yang Tsung-hua	(Slovenia) Blaž Kavčič (India) Prajnesh Gunneswaran (Croatia) Ante Pavić (France) Antoine Escoffier
November 20	Bengaluru Open; Bangalore, India; Hard – $100,000+H – 32S/32Q/16D; Singles – Doubles	(Russia) Mikhail Elgin (India) Divij Sharan; 6–3, 6–0	(Croatia) Ivan Sabanov (Croatia) Matej Sabanov	(India) Yuki Bhambri (Chinese Taipei) Yang Tsung-hua	(Slovenia) Blaž Kavčič (India) Prajnesh Gunneswaran (Croatia) Ante Pavić (France) Antoine Escoffier
November 20	Internazionali di Tennis Castel del Monte; Andria, Italy; Carpet (i) – €43,000+H – 32S/32Q/16D; Singles – Doubles	(Belarus) Uladzimir Ignatik; 6–7^{(3–7)}, 6–4, 7–6^{(7–3)}	(Belgium) Christopher Heyman	(Italy) Filippo Baldi (Bosnia and Herzegovina) Mirza Bašić	(Croatia) Franko Škugor (Italy) Andrea Pellegrino (Croatia) Viktor Galović (Czech Republic) Zdeněk Kolář
November 20	Internazionali di Tennis Castel del Monte; Andria, Italy; Carpet (i) – €43,000+H – 32S/32Q/16D; Singles – Doubles	(Italy) Lorenzo Sonego (Italy) Andrea Vavassori; 6–3, 3–6, [10–7]	(Netherlands) Sander Arends (Belgium) Sander Gillé	(Italy) Filippo Baldi (Bosnia and Herzegovina) Mirza Bašić	(Croatia) Franko Škugor (Italy) Andrea Pellegrino (Croatia) Viktor Galović (Czech Republic) Zdeněk Kolář
November 20	Rio Tennis Classic; Rio de Janeiro, Brazil; Clay – $50,000+H – 32S/32Q/16D; Singles – Doubles	(Argentina) Carlos Berlocq; 6–4, 2–6, 3–0 ret.	(Spain) Jaume Munar	(Brazil) Thiago Monteiro (Argentina) Pedro Cachin	(Brazil) Rogério Dutra Silva (Brazil) Guilherme Clezar (Dominican Republic) José Hernández-Fernández (Argentina) Andrea Collarini
November 20	Rio Tennis Classic; Rio de Janeiro, Brazil; Clay – $50,000+H – 32S/32Q/16D; Singles – Doubles	(Argentina) Máximo González (Brazil) Fabrício Neis; 5–7, 6–4, [10–4]	(El Salvador) Marcelo Arévalo (Mexico) Miguel Ángel Reyes-Varela	(Brazil) Thiago Monteiro (Argentina) Pedro Cachin	(Brazil) Rogério Dutra Silva (Brazil) Guilherme Clezar (Dominican Republic) José Hernández-Fernández (Argentina) Andrea Collarini

== Statistical information ==
These tables present the number of singles (S) and doubles (D) titles won by each player and each nation during the season. The players/nations are sorted by: 1) total number of titles (a doubles title won by two players representing the same nation counts as only one win for the nation); 2) a singles > doubles hierarchy; 3) alphabetical order (by family names for players).

To avoid confusion and double counting, these tables should be updated only after an event is completed.

=== Titles won by player ===
Total	Player	S	D	S	D
7	Miguel Ángel Reyes-Varela (MEX)		● ● ● ● ● ● ●	0	7
6	Marcelo Arévalo (ESA)	●	● ● ● ● ●	1	5
6	Sanchai Ratiwatana (THA)		● ● ● ● ● ●	0	6
6	Neal Skupski (GBR)		● ● ● ● ● ●	0	6
5	Filip Krajinović (SRB)	● ● ● ● ●		5	0
5	Nicolás Jarry (CHI)	● ● ●	● ●	3	2
5	Sander Arends (NED)		● ● ● ● ●	0	5
5	Jonathan Eysseric (FRA)		● ● ● ● ●	0	5
5	Sander Gillé (BEL)		● ● ● ● ●	0	5
5	Leander Paes (IND)		● ● ● ● ●	0	5
5	Hans Podlipnik-Castillo (CHI)		● ● ● ● ●	0	5
5	Sonchat Ratiwatana (THA)		● ● ● ● ●	0	5
5	Adil Shamasdin (CAN)		● ● ● ● ●	0	5
5	Andrei Vasilevski (BLR)		● ● ● ● ●	0	5
4	Janko Tipsarević (SRB)	● ● ● ●		4	0
4	Andre Begemann (GER)		● ● ● ●	0	4
4	Máximo González (ARG)		● ● ● ●	0	4
4	Hsieh Cheng-peng (TPE)		● ● ● ●	0	4
4	Roman Jebavý (CZE)		● ● ● ●	0	4
4	Peng Hsien-yin (TPE)		● ● ● ●	0	4
4	Joe Salisbury (GBR)		● ● ● ●	0	4
4	Antonio Šančić (CRO)		● ● ● ●	0	4
4	Vishnu Vardhan (IND)		● ● ● ●	0	4
4	Joran Vliegen (BEL)		● ● ● ●	0	4
4	Jackson Withrow (USA)		● ● ● ●	0	4
4	Igor Zelenay (SVK)		● ● ● ●	0	4
3	Aljaž Bedene (GBR)	● ● ●		3	0
3	Thomas Fabbiano (ITA)	● ● ●		3	0
3	Egor Gerasimov (BLR)	● ● ●		3	0
3	Lu Yen-hsun (TPE)	● ● ●		3	0
3	Maximilian Marterer (GER)	● ● ●		3	0
3	Cameron Norrie (GBR)	● ● ●		3	0
3	Pedro Sousa (POR)	● ● ●		3	0
3	Cedrik-Marcel Stebe (GER)	● ● ●		3	0
3	Yūichi Sugita (JPN)	● ● ●		3	0
3	Evgeny Donskoy (RUS)	● ●	●	2	1
3	Gerald Melzer (AUT)	● ●	●	2	1
3	Jürgen Melzer (AUT)	● ●	●	2	1
3	Adrián Menéndez Maceiras (ESP)	● ●	●	2	1
3	Marco Cecchinato (ITA)	●	● ●	1	2
3	Sergiy Stakhovsky (UKR)	●	● ●	1	2
3	Sriram Balaji (IND)		● ● ●	0	3
3	Alex Bolt (AUS)		● ● ●	0	3
3	Marin Draganja (CRO)		● ● ●	0	3
3	Tomislav Draganja (CRO)		● ● ●	0	3
3	Mikhail Elgin (RUS)		● ● ●	0	3
3	Brydan Klein (GBR)		● ● ●	0	3
3	Julian Knowle (AUT)		● ● ●	0	3
3	Zdeněk Kolář (CZE)		● ● ●	0	3
3	Denis Kudla (USA)		● ● ●	0	3
3	(New Zealand) / Ben McLachlan (JPN)		● ● ●	0	3
3	Andreas Mies (GER)		● ● ●	0	3
3	Andrés Molteni (ARG)		● ● ●	0	3
3	Bradley Mousley (AUS)		● ● ●	0	3
3	Fabrício Neis (BRA)		● ● ●	0	3
3	David O'Hare (IRL)		● ● ●	0	3
3	Purav Raja (IND)		● ● ●	0	3
3	Franko Škugor (CRO)		● ● ●	0	3
3	Ken Skupski (GBR)		● ● ●	0	3
3	Tristan-Samuel Weissborn (AUT)		● ● ●	0	3
2	Félix Auger-Aliassime (CAN)	● ●		2	0
2	Alexander Bublik (KAZ)	● ●		2	0
2	Roberto Carballés Baena (ESP)	● ●		2	0
2	Federico Delbonis (ARG)	● ●		2	0
2	Rogério Dutra Silva (BRA)	● ●		2	0
2	Matthew Ebden (AUS)	● ●		2	0
2	Márton Fucsovics (HUN)	● ●		2	0
2	Guillermo García López (ESP)	● ●		2	0
2	Uladzimir Ignatik (BLR)	● ●		2	0
2	Blaž Kavčič (SLO)	● ●		2	0
2	Lukáš Lacko (SVK)	● ●		2	0
2	Adrian Mannarino (FRA)	● ●		2	0
2	Andrej Martin (SVK)	● ●		2	0
2	Guido Pella (ARG)	● ●		2	0
2	Tennys Sandgren (USA)	● ●		2	0
2	Dudi Sela (ISR)	● ●		2	0
2	Denis Shapovalov (CAN)	● ●		2	0
2	Tim Smyczek (USA)	● ●		2	0
2	Frances Tiafoe (USA)	● ●		2	0
2	Elias Ymer (SWE)	● ●		2	0
2	Mikhail Youzhny (RUS)	● ●		2	0
2	Radu Albot (MDA)	●	●	1	1
2	Jaume Munar (ESP)	●	●	1	1
2	Oscar Otte (GER)	●	●	1	1
2	Ante Pavić (CRO)	●	●	1	1
2	Blaž Rola (SLO)	●	●	1	1
2	Lorenzo Sonego (ITA)	●	●	1	1
2	Yasutaka Uchiyama (JPN)	●	●	1	1
2	Zhang Ze (CHN)	●	●	1	1
2	Guido Andreozzi (ARG)		● ●	0	2
2	Romain Arneodo (MON)		● ●	0	2
2	Luke Bambridge (GBR)		● ●	0	2
2	James Cerretani (USA)		● ●	0	2
2	Marco Chiudinelli (SUI)		● ●	0	2
2	Marcus Daniell (NZL)		● ●	0	2
2	Fabiano de Paula (BRA)		● ●	0	2
2	Matteo Donati (ITA)		● ●	0	2
2	Guillermo Durán (ARG)		● ●	0	2
2	Sergio Galdós (PER)		● ●	0	2
2	Gao Xin (CHN)		● ●	0	2
2	Laurynas Grigelis (LTU)		● ●	0	2
2	Quentin Halys (FRA)		● ●	0	2
2	Wesley Koolhof (NED)		● ●	0	2
2	Austin Krajicek (USA)		● ●	0	2
2	Gero Kretschmer (GER)		● ●	0	2
2	Tristan Lamasine (FRA)		● ●	0	2
2	Scott Lipsky (USA)		● ●	0	2
2	Dino Marcan (CRO)		● ●	0	2
2	Toshihide Matsui (JPN)		● ●	0	2
2	Max Purcell (AUS)		● ●	0	2
2	Christopher Rungkat (INA)		● ●	0	2
2	Alexander Satschko (GER)		● ●	0	2
2	Max Schnur (USA)		● ●	0	2
2	Divij Sharan (IND)		● ●	0	2
2	Artem Sitak (NZL)		● ●	0	2
2	Jan-Lennard Struff (GER)		● ●	0	2
2	Caio Zampieri (BRA)		● ●	0	2
1	Matthias Bachinger (GER)	●		1	0
1	Mirza Bašić (BIH)	●		1	0
1	Ruben Bemelmans (BEL)	●		1	0
1	Ričardas Berankis (LTU)	●		1	0
1	Carlos Berlocq (ARG)	●		1	0
1	Matteo Berrettini (ITA)	●		1	0
1	Yuki Bhambri (IND)	●		1	0
1	Mathias Bourgue (FRA)	●		1	0
1	Chung Hyeon (KOR)	●		1	0
1	Pablo Cuevas (URU)	●		1	0
1	Taro Daniel (JPN)	●		1	0
1	Steve Darcis (BEL)	●		1	0
1	Laslo Đere (SRB)	●		1	0
1	João Domingues (POR)	●		1	0
1	Damir Džumhur (BIH)	●		1	0
1	Gastão Elias (POR)	●		1	0
1	Víctor Estrella Burgos (DOM)	●		1	0
1	Viktor Galović (CRO)	●		1	0
1	Richard Gasquet (FRA)	●		1	0
1	Peter Gojowczyk (GER)	●		1	0
1	Norbert Gombos (SVK)	●		1	0
1	Yannick Hanfmann (GER)	●		1	0
1	Ryan Harrison (USA)	●		1	0
1	Calvin Hemery (FRA)	●		1	0
1	Ilya Ivashka (BLR)	●		1	0
1	Jerzy Janowicz (POL)	●		1	0
1	Omar Jasika (AUS)	●		1	0
1	Malek Jaziri (TUN)	●		1	0
1	Jason Jung (TPE)	●		1	0
1	Miomir Kecmanović (SRB)	●		1	0
1	Nicolás Kicker (ARG)	●		1	0
1	Kevin King (USA)	●		1	0
1	Stefan Kozlov (USA)	●		1	0
1	Jason Kubler (AUS)	●		1	0
1	Nicola Kuhn (ESP)	●		1	0
1	Dušan Lajović (SRB)	●		1	0
1	Paolo Lorenzi (ITA)	●		1	0
1	Illya Marchenko (UKR)	●		1	0
1	Mackenzie McDonald (USA)	●		1	0
1	John Millman (AUS)	●		1	0
1	Michael Mmoh (USA)	●		1	0
1	Corentin Moutet (FRA)	●		1	0
1	Sumit Nagal (IND)	●		1	0
1	Ricardo Ojeda Lara (ESP)	●		1	0
1	Filip Peliwo (CAN)	●		1	0
1	Vasek Pospisil (CAN)	●		1	0
1	Stéphane Robert (FRA)	●		1	0
1	Noah Rubin (USA)	●		1	0
1	Akira Santillan (JPN)	●		1	0
1	Stefano Travaglia (ITA)	●		1	0
1	Stefanos Tsitsipas (GRE)	●		1	0
1	Alexey Vatutin (RUS)	●		1	0
1	Jiří Veselý (CZE)	●		1	0
1	Wu Yibing (CHN)	●		1	0
1	Jürgen Zopp (EST)	●		1	0
1	Franco Agamenone (ARG)		●	0	1
1	Tuna Altuna (TUR)		●	0	1
1	Facundo Argüello (ARG)		●	0	1
1	Attila Balázs (HUN)		●	0	1
1	Grégoire Barrère (FRA)		●	0	1
1	Marcelo Tomás Barrios Vera (CHI)		●	0	1
1	Tomasz Bednarek (POL)		●	0	1
1	Ariel Behar (URU)		●	0	1
1	Tomislav Brkić (BIH)		●	0	1
1	Pedro Cachin (ARG)		●	0	1
1	Salvatore Caruso (ITA)		●	0	1
1	Íñigo Cervantes (ESP)		●	0	1
1	Chen Ti (TPE)		●	0	1
1	Scott Clayton (GBR)		●	0	1
1	Steven de Waard (AUS)		●	0	1
1	Marcelo Demoliner (BRA)		●	0	1
1	Jonathan Erlich (ISR)		●	0	1
1	Christopher Eubanks (USA)		●	0	1
1	Teymuraz Gabashvili (RUS)		●	0	1
1	Gong Maoxin (CHN)		●	0	1
1	Santiago González (MEX)		●	0	1
1	André Göransson (SWE)		●	0	1
1	Sam Groth (AUS)		●	0	1
1	Timur Khabibulin (KAZ)		●	0	1
1	Darian King (BAR)		●	0	1
1	Evan King (USA)		●	0	1
1	Bradley Klahn (USA)		●	0	1
1	Martin Kližan (SVK)		●	0	1
1	Dominik Köpfer (GER)		●	0	1
1	Jozef Kovalík (SVK)		●	0	1
1	Mateusz Kowalczyk (POL)		●	0	1
1	Kevin Krawietz (GER)		●	0	1
1	Florian Lakat (FRA)		●	0	1
1	Juan Ignacio Londero (ARG)		●	0	1
1	Luis David Martínez (VEN)		●	0	1
1	Matwé Middelkoop (NED)		●	0	1
1	Denys Molchanov (UKR)		●	0	1
1	Saketh Myneni (IND)		●	0	1
1	Aleksandr Nedovyesov (KAZ)		●	0	1
1	Jeevan Nedunchezhiyan (IND)		●	0	1
1	Daniel Nguyen (USA)		●	0	1
1	Frederik Nielsen (DEN)		●	0	1
1	Hugo Nys (FRA)		●	0	1
1	Jonny O'Mara (GBR)		●	0	1
1	David Pel (NED)		●	0	1
1	Peter Polansky (CAN)		●	0	1
1	Vijay Sundar Prashanth (IND)		●	0	1
1	Dane Propoggia (AUS)		●	0	1
1	Tim Pütz (GER)		●	0	1
1	Roberto Quiroz (ECU)		●	0	1
1	Aisam-ul-Haq Qureshi (PAK)		●	0	1
1	Matt Reid (AUS)		●	0	1
1	Ruan Roelofse (RSA)		●	0	1
1	Fernando Romboli (BRA)		●	0	1
1	Václav Šafránek (CZE)		●	0	1
1	Jan Šátral (CZE)		●	0	1
1	Luke Saville (AUS)		●	0	1
1	John-Patrick Smith (AUS)		●	0	1
1	Rubin Statham (NZL)		●	0	1
1	Sun Fajing (CHN)		●	0	1
1	Carlos Taberner (ESP)		●	0	1
1	Danny Thomas (USA)		●	0	1
1	Pol Toledo Bagué (ESP)		●	0	1
1	Walter Trusendi (ITA)		●	0	1
1	Botic van de Zandschulp (NED)		●	0	1
1	Andrea Vavassori (ITA)		●	0	1
1	Matteo Viola (ITA)		●	0	1
1	Boy Westerhof (NED)		●	0	1
1	Andrew Whittington (AUS)		●	0	1
1	Yi Chu-huan (TPE)		●	0	1
1	Zhang Zhizhen (CHN)		●	0	1

=== Titles won by nation ===
Total	Nation	S	D
25	United States (USA)	12	13
21	Germany (GER)	10	11
20	Great Britain (GBR)	6	14
17	Argentina (ARG)	6	11
16	France (FRA)	7	9
15	Croatia (CRO)	2	13
15	India (IND)	2	13
14	Australia (AUS)	5	9
13	Spain (ESP)	9	4
13	Italy (ITA)	8	5
12	Serbia (SRB)	12	0
12	Canada (CAN)	6	6
12	Austria (AUT)	4	8
11	Belarus (BLR)	6	5
11	Brazil (BRA)	2	9
10	Japan (JPN)	6	4
10	Slovakia (SVK)	5	5
10	Chinese Taipei (TPE)	4	6
10	Chile (CHI)	3	7
9	Russia (RUS)	5	4
9	Czech Republic (CZE)	1	8
9	Netherlands (NED)	0	9
8	Mexico (MEX)	0	8
7	Belgium (BEL)	2	5
6	El Salvador (ESA)	1	5
6	New Zealand (NZL)	0	6
6	Thailand (THA)	0	6
5	Portugal (POR)	5	0
5	China (CHN)	2	3
4	Slovenia (SLO)	3	1
4	Ukraine (UKR)	2	2
3	Bosnia and Herzegovina (BIH)	2	1
3	Hungary (HUN)	2	1
3	Israel (ISR)	2	1
3	Kazakhstan (KAZ)	2	1
3	Sweden (SWE)	2	1
3	Lithuania (LTU)	1	2
3	Poland (POL)	1	2
3	Ireland (IRL)	0	3
2	Moldova (MDA)	1	1
2	Uruguay (URU)	1	1
2	Indonesia (INA)	0	2
2	Monaco (MON)	0	2
2	Peru (PER)	0	2
2	Switzerland (SUI)	0	2
1	Dominican Republic (DOM)	1	0
1	Estonia (EST)	1	0
1	Greece (GRE)	1	0
1	South Korea (KOR)	1	0
1	Tunisia (TUN)	1	0
1	Barbados (BAR)	0	1
1	Denmark (DEN)	0	1
1	Ecuador (ECU)	0	1
1	Pakistan (PAK)	0	1
1	South Africa (RSA)	0	1
1	Turkey (TUR)	0	1
1	Venezuela (VEN)	0	1

== Point distribution ==
Points are awarded as follows:

Tournament Category	Singles										Doubles				
Tournament Category	W	F	SF	QF	R16	R32	Q	Q3	Q2	Q1	W	F	SF	QF	R16
Challenger $150,000+H; Challenger €127,000+H	125	75	45	25	10	0	+5	0	0	0	125	75	45	25	0
Challenger $150,000 or $125,000+H; Challenger €127,000 or €106,000+H	110	65	40	20	9	0	+5	0	0	0	110	65	40	20	0
Challenger $125,000 or $100,000+H; Challenger €106,000 or €85,000+H	100	60	35	18	8	0	+5	0	0	0	100	60	35	18	0
Challenger $100,000 or $75,000+H; Challenger €85,000 or €64,000+H	90	55	33	17	8	0	+5	0	0	0	90	55	33	17	0
Challenger $75,000; Challenger €64,000	80	48	29	15	7	0	+3	0	0	0	80	48	29	15	0
Challenger $50,000+H; Challenger €43,000+H	80	48	29	15	6	0	+3	0	0	0	80	48	29	15	0
