= 2012 Challenger Ciudad de Guayaquil – Doubles =

Doubles
- 2012 Challenger Ciudad de Guayaquil

Final
- Champions: (Argentina) Martín Alund (Argentina) Facundo Bagnis
- Runners-up: (Argentina) Leonardo Mayer (Argentina) Martín Ríos-Benítez
- Score: 7–5, 7–6^{(7–5)}

Events
| Singles | Doubles |
| ← 2011 · | Challenger Ciudad de Guayaquil | · 2013 → |

Júlio César Campozano and Roberto Quiroz were the defending champions but Quiroz decided not to participate.
Campozano played alongside Emilio Gómez, but they lost in the first round.
Martín Alund and Facundo Bagnis won the title, defeating Leonardo Mayer and Martín Ríos-Benítez 7–5, 7–6^{(7–5)} in the final.

== Seeds ==
1. (United States) Nicholas Monroe / (Germany) Simon Stadler (semifinals)
2. (Colombia) Juan Sebastián Cabal / (Spain) Rubén Ramírez Hidalgo (quarterfinals)
3. (Argentina) Martín Alund / (Argentina) Facundo Bagnis (champions)
4. (Montenegro) Goran Tošić / (United States) Denis Zivkovic (semifinals)

== Draw ==
=== Key ===
- Q = Qualifier
- WC = Wild card
- LL = Lucky loser
- Alt = Alternate
- ITF = ITF entry
- PR = Protected ranking
- SR = Special ranking
- SE = Special exempt
- JE = Junior exempt
- JR = Junior Accelerator Programme entrant
- CO = College Accelerator Programme entrant
- NG = Next Gen Accelerator Program entrant
- w/o = Walkover
- r = Retired
- d = Defaulted

=== Draw ===
First round
1 | (United States) N Monroe (Germany) S Stadler | 6 | 6^{6} | [10]
(Moldova) R Borvanov (United States) A El Mihdawy | 4 | 7^{8} | [5]
(Chile) J Aguilar (Mexico) D Garza | 6 | 6
(Russia) Alexander Lobkov (Colombia) Sebastian Serrano | 4 | 2
3 | (Argentina) M Alund (Argentina) F Bagnis | 6 | 7^{7}
(Peru) S Galdós (Argentina) G Pella | 3 | 6^{5}
(Peru) D Beretta (Argentina) R Olivo | 4 | 1
(Philippines) R Gonzales (Australia) Chris Letcher | 6 | 6
WC | (Ecuador) Alejandro Estrada (Ecuador) J-S Vivanco | 3 | 2
(Colombia) A González (Colombia) C Salamanca | 6 | 6
WC | (Ecuador) JC Campozano (Ecuador) E Gómez | 3 | 6 | [9]
4 | (Montenegro) G Tošić (United States) D Zivkovic | 6 | 4 | [11]
WC | (Argentina) L Mayer (Argentina) Martín Ríos-Benítez | 7^{7} | 5 | [10]
(Colombia) N Barrientos (Chile) C Saavedra-Corvalán | 6^{3} | 7 | [6]
Alt | (Argentina) Maximiliano Estévez (Argentina) Mateo Martínez | 1 | 3
2 | (Colombia) JS Cabal (Spain) R Ramírez Hidalgo | 6 | 6

Quarterfinals
1 | (United States) N Monroe (Germany) S Stadler | 7 | 7^{7}
(Chile) J Aguilar (Mexico) D Garza | 5 | 6^{1}
3 | (Argentina) M Alund (Argentina) F Bagnis | 6 | 6
(Philippines) R Gonzales (Australia) C Letcher | 4 | 2
(Colombia) A González (Colombia) C Salamanca | 2 | 4
4 | (Montenegro) G Tošić (United States) D Zivkovic | 6 | 6
WC | (Argentina) L Mayer (Argentina) M Ríos-Benítez | 6 | 5 | [10]
2 | (Colombia) JS Cabal (Spain) R Ramírez Hidalgo | 3 | 7 | [8]

Semifinals
1 | (United States) N Monroe (Germany) S Stadler | 6^{1} | 3
3 | (Argentina) M Alund (Argentina) F Bagnis | 7^{7} | 6
4 | (Montenegro) G Tošić (United States) D Zivkovic | 6 | 3 | [6]
WC | (Argentina) L Mayer (Argentina) M Ríos-Benítez | 3 | 6 | [10]

Final
3 | (Argentina) M Alund (Argentina) F Bagnis | 7 | 7^{7}
WC | (Argentina) L Mayer (Argentina) M Ríos-Benítez | 5 | 6^{5}
