= 2012 Challenger Ciudad de Guayaquil – Singles =

Singles
- 2012 Challenger Ciudad de Guayaquil

Final
- Champion: (Argentina) Leonardo Mayer
- Runner-up: (Italy) Paolo Lorenzi
- Score: 6–2, 6–4

Events
Singles	Doubles
← 2011 ·	Challenger Ciudad de Guayaquil	· 2013 →

Matteo Viola was the defending champion but decided not to participate.
Leonardo Mayer won the title after defeating Paolo Lorenzi 6–2, 6–4 in the final.

== Seeds ==
1. (Argentina) Leonardo Mayer (champion)
2. (Italy) Paolo Lorenzi (final)
3. (Spain) Rubén Ramírez Hidalgo (semifinals)
4. (Argentina) Guido Pella (quarterfinals)
5. (Argentina) Martín Alund (semifinals)
6. (United States) Wayne Odesnik (second round)
7. (Portugal) Frederico Gil (second round)
8. (Russia) Teymuraz Gabashvili (first round)

== Draw ==
=== Key ===
- Q = Qualifier
- WC = Wild card
- LL = Lucky loser
- Alt = Alternate
- SE = Special exempt
- PR = Protected ranking
- ITF = ITF entry
- JE = Junior exempt
- w/o = Walkover
- r = Retired
- d = Defaulted
- SR = Special ranking

=== Finals ===
Semifinals
1	(Argentina) Leonardo Mayer	6	7
5	(Argentina) Martín Alund	2	5
3	(Spain) Rubén Ramírez Hidalgo	6^{4}	7^{11}	6^{2}
2	(Italy) Paolo Lorenzi	7^{7}	6^{9}	7^{7}

Final
1	(Argentina) Leonardo Mayer	6	6
2	(Italy) Paolo Lorenzi	2	4

=== Top half ===
First round
1	(Argentina) L Mayer	6	6
(Chile) C Saavedra-Corvalán	4	2
WC	(Ecuador) E Gómez	6	6
(Argentina) R Olivo	3	4
Q	(Argentina) Franco Scaravilli	2	3
(Portugal) P Sousa	6	6
WC	(Ecuador) Alejandro Jose Gomez Estrada	1	0
7	(Portugal) F Gil	6	6
4	(Argentina) G Pella	4	6	6
Q	(Peru) S Galdós	6	3	1
(Colombia) N Barrientos	6^{6}	7^{7}	7
(United States) A El Mihdawy	7^{8}	6^{2}	5
(Chile) J Aguilar	6	3	6^{5}
WC	(Peru) D Beretta	4	6	7^{7}
(Colombia) C Salamanca	3	4
5	(Argentina) M Alund	6	6

Second round
1	(Argentina) L Mayer	6	6
WC	(Ecuador) E Gómez	3	3
(Portugal) P Sousa	6	6
7	(Portugal) F Gil	1	1
4	(Argentina) G Pella	6	6^{4}	6
(Colombia) N Barrientos	3	7^{7}	3
WC	(Peru) D Beretta	0	3
5	(Argentina) M Alund	6	6

Quarterfinals
1	(Argentina) L Mayer	3	6	6
(Portugal) P Sousa	6	3	3
4	(Argentina) G Pella	5	3
5	(Argentina) M Alund	7	6

Semifinals
1	(Argentina) L Mayer	6	7
5	(Argentina) M Alund	2	5

=== Bottom half ===
First round
6	(United States) W Odesnik	6	6
(Moldova) R Borvanov	1	4
WC	(Ecuador) J-S Vivanco	2	3
SE	(Colombia) JS Cabal	6	6
(Russia) Alexander Lobkov	6^{4}	7^{7}	6
(Argentina) Maximiliano Estévez	7^{7}	6^{4}	3
(United States) D Zivkovic	6	3	3
3	(Spain) R Ramírez Hidalgo	3	6	6
8	(Russia) T Gabashvili	6^{6}	6^{7}
(Colombia) A González	7^{8}	7^{9}
Q	(Argentina) Mateo Nicolás Martínez	6^{5}	5
Q	(Mexico) D Garza	7^{7}	7
(Argentina) F Bagnis	6^{4}	7^{8}	6^{10}
(Argentina) M Trungelliti	7^{7}	6^{6}	7^{12}
(Ecuador) JC Campozano	2	6^{5}
2	(Italy) P Lorenzi	6	7^{7}

Second round
6	(United States) W Odesnik	4	3
SE	(Colombia) JS Cabal	6	6
(Russia) A Lobkov	3	4
3	(Spain) R Ramírez Hidalgo	6	6
(Colombia) A González	6	6
Q	(Mexico) D Garza	3	2
(Argentina) M Trungelliti	2	2
2	(Italy) P Lorenzi	6	6

Quarterfinals
SE	(Colombia) JS Cabal	6	4	3
3	(Spain) R Ramírez Hidalgo	3	6	6
(Colombia) A González	6^{3}	6^{2}
2	(Italy) P Lorenzi	7^{7}	7^{7}

Semifinals
3	(Spain) R Ramírez Hidalgo	6^{4}	7^{11}	6^{2}
2	(Italy) P Lorenzi	7^{7}	6^{9}	7^{7}
