= 2009 Challenger Ciudad de Guayaquil – Doubles =

Doubles
- 2009 Challenger Ciudad de Guayaquil

Final
- Champions: (Ecuador) Júlio César Campozano (Ecuador) Emilio Gómez
- Runners-up: (Austria) Andreas Haider-Maurer (Germany) Lars Pörschke
- Score: 6–7(2), 6–3, [10–8]

Events
Singles	Doubles
← 2008 ·	Challenger Ciudad de Guayaquil	· 2010 →

The 2009 Challenger Ciudad de Guayaquil was a professional tennis tournament played on outdoor red clay courts. It was the fifth edition of the tournament which was part of the 2009 ATP Challenger Tour. It took place in Guayaquil, Ecuador between 9 and 15 November 2009.

Sebastián Decoud and Santiago Giraldo were the defending champions, but Giraldo competed only in singles.
Decoud chose to start with Eduardo Schwank. They withdrew before match against Júlio César Campozano and Emilio Gómez in the quarterfinal.
Campozano and Gómez, who received a Wild Card into the doubles draw, won this tournament. They defeated Andreas Haider-Maurer and Lars Pörschke 6–7(2), 6–3, [10–8] in the final.

== Seeds ==
1. (Argentina) ~~Brian Dabul~~ / (Argentina) ~~Sergio Roitman~~ (withdrew)
2. (Brazil) Rogério Dutra da Silva / (Brazil) Júlio Silva (first round)
3. (Brazil) Ricardo Hocevar / (Brazil) João Souza (first round)
4. (Argentina) Diego Álvarez / (Argentina) Diego Cristín (quarterfinals)

== Draw ==
=== Key ===
- Q = Qualifier
- WC = Wild card
- LL = Lucky loser
- Alt = Alternate
- SE = Special exempt
- PR = Protected ranking
- ITF = ITF entry
- JE = Junior exempt
- w/o = Walkover
- r = Retired
- d = Defaulted
- SR = Special ranking

=== Draw ===
First round
ALT	(Ecuador) I Endara (Chile) H Podlipnik	6^{9}	6	[7]
WC	(Ecuador) JC Campozano (Ecuador) E Gómez	7	4	[10]
WC	(Ecuador) D Hidalgo (Ecuador) R Quiroz	6^{3}	3
(Argentina) S Decoud (Argentina) E Schwank	7	6
3	(Brazil) R Hocevar (Brazil) J Souza	5	4
(Uruguay) M Felder (Colombia) C Salamanca	7	6
(Monaco) B Balleret (Portugal) L Tavares	6	6
WC	(Argentina) A Apud (Russia) D Sirota	0	2
(Serbia) F Krajinović (Argentina) G Pella	4	3
(Dominican Republic) V Estrella (Chile) G Hormazábal	6	6
(Argentina) M Alund (Argentina) A Molteni	7	6^{5}	[4]
4	(Argentina) D Álvarez (Argentina) D Cristín	6^{5}	7	[10]
(Austria) A Haider-Maurer (Germany) L Pörschke
(Chile) J Aguilar (Chile) N Massú	w/o
(Argentina) J-M Aranguren (Argentina) C Berlocq	7	3	[10]
2	(Brazil) R Dutra da Silva (Brazil) J Silva	6^{3}	6	[6]

Quarterfinals
WC	(Ecuador) JC Campozano (Ecuador) E Gómez
(Argentina) S Decoud (Argentina) E Schwank	w/o
(Uruguay) M Felder (Colombia) C Salamanca	w/o
(Monaco) B Balleret (Portugal) L Tavares
(Dominican Republic) V Estrella (Chile) G Hormazábal	7	7
4	(Argentina) D Álvarez (Argentina) D Cristín	5	6^{2}
(Austria) A Haider-Maurer (Germany) L Pörschke	6	6
(Argentina) J-M Aranguren (Argentina) C Berlocq	4	2

Semifinals
WC	(Ecuador) JC Campozano (Ecuador) E Gómez	7	5	[10]
(Monaco) B Balleret (Portugal) L Tavares	6^{4}	7	[7]
(Dominican Republic) V Estrella (Chile) G Hormazábal	1	1
(Austria) A Haider-Maurer (Germany) L Pörschke	6	6

Finals
WC	(Ecuador) JC Campozano (Ecuador) E Gómez	6^{2}	6	[10]
(Austria) A Haider-Maurer (Germany) L Pörschke	7	3	[8]
