= 2010 Challenger Ciudad de Guayaquil – Singles =

Singles
- 2010 Challenger Ciudad de Guayaquil

Final
- Champion: (Chile) Paul Capdeville
- Runner-up: (Argentina) Diego Junqueira
- Score: 6–3, 3–6, 6–3

Events
Singles	Doubles
← 2009 ·	Challenger Ciudad de Guayaquil	· 2011 →

Nicolás Lapentti was the defending champion; however, he retired from professional tennis before this tournament.
Paul Capdeville won the title, defeating Diego Junqueira 6–3, 3–6, 6–3 in the final.

== Seeds ==
1. (Argentina) Carlos Berlocq (semifinals)
2. (Argentina) Brian Dabul (first round)
3. (Brazil) João Souza (second round)
4. (Argentina) Horacio Zeballos (first round)
5. (Slovenia) Grega Žemlja (second round)
6. (Brazil) Marcos Daniel (quarterfinals, retired)
7. (Argentina) Máximo González (semifinals)
8. (France) Éric Prodon (quarterfinals)

== Draw ==
=== Key ===
- Q = Qualifier
- WC = Wild card
- LL = Lucky loser
- Alt = Alternate
- SE = Special exempt
- PR = Protected ranking
- ITF = ITF entry
- JE = Junior exempt
- w/o = Walkover
- r = Retired
- d = Defaulted
- SR = Special ranking

=== Final four ===
Semifinals
1	(Argentina) Carlos Berlocq	3	5
(Argentina) Diego Junqueira	6	7
(Chile) Paul Capdeville	7	3	6
7	(Argentina) Máximo González	6^{4}	6	2

Final
(Argentina) Diego Junqueira	3	6	3
(Chile) Paul Capdeville	6	3	6

=== Top half ===
First round
1	(Argentina) C Berlocq	6	6
Q	(Italy) G Naso	0	3
(Colombia) R Farah	6	6
WC	(Ecuador) JC Campozano	4	1
(France) A Gensse	6	6
WC	(Ecuador) E Gómez	4	4
Q	(Monaco) B Balleret	2	4
8	(France) É Prodon	6	6
3	(Brazil) J Souza	6	6
WC	(Ecuador) R Quiroz	1	2
(Argentina) D Junqueira	6	1	7
(Brazil) R Hocevar	3	6	5
(Chile) J Aguilar	6	6
Q	(Italy) Andrea Arnaboldi	2	4
(Mexico) S González	4	2
6	(Brazil) M Daniel	6	6

Second round
1	(Argentina) C Berlocq	6	6
(Colombia) R Farah	3	0
(France) A Gensse	3	5
8	(France) É Prodon	6	7
3	(Brazil) J Souza	7	4	4
(Argentina) D Junqueira	5	6	6
(Chile) J Aguilar	3	2
6	(Brazil) M Daniel	6	6

Quarterfinals
1	(Argentina) C Berlocq	6	6
8	(France) É Prodon	2	2
(Argentina) D Junqueira	1
6	(Brazil) M Daniel	4	r

Semifinals
1	(Argentina) C Berlocq	3	5
(Argentina) D Junqueira	6	7

=== Bottom half ===
First round
5	(Slovenia) G Žemlja	6	6^{6}	6
(Colombia) C Salamanca	3	7	3
(Chile) P Capdeville	6	6
(Colombia) JS Cabal	1	4
(France) G Rufin	4	6	7
(Argentina) M Alund	6	2	6^{2}
(Ecuador) G Lapentti	6^{4}	6	6
4	(Argentina) H Zeballos	7	4	4
7	(Argentina) M González	6	5	7
(Portugal) L Tavares	4	7	5
WC	(United States) E Nunez	3	5
(Dominican Republic) V Estrella	6	7
Q	(Argentina) M Vassallo Argüello	7	6
(Argentina) F Bagnis	5	1
(Brazil) R Dutra da Silva	6	7
2	(Argentina) B Dabul	4	5

Second round
5	(Slovenia) G Žemlja	4	3
(Chile) P Capdeville	6	6
(France) G Rufin	w/o
(Ecuador) G Lapentti
7	(Argentina) M González	6	6
(Dominican Republic) V Estrella	2	0
Q	(Argentina) M Vassallo Argüello	6	r
(Brazil) R Dutra da Silva	6

Quarterfinals
(Chile) P Capdeville	0	7	6
(Ecuador) G Lapentti	6	5	4
7	(Argentina) M González	7	6
(Brazil) R Dutra da Silva	6^{2}	0

Semifinals
(Chile) P Capdeville	7	3	6
7	(Argentina) M González	6^{4}	6	2
