= 2022 Challenger Ciudad de Guayaquil – Singles =

Singles
- 2022 Challenger Ciudad de Guayaquil

Final
- Champion: (Germany) Daniel Altmaier
- Runner-up: (Argentina) Federico Coria
- Score: 6–2, 6–4

Events
Singles	Doubles
← 2021 ·	Challenger Ciudad de Guayaquil	· 2023 →

Alejandro Tabilo was the defending champion but chose not to defend his title.

Daniel Altmaier won the title after defeating Federico Coria 6–2, 6–4 in the final.

== Seeds ==
1. (Argentina) Federico Coria (final)
2. (Argentina) Tomás Martín Etcheverry (first round)
3. (Germany) Daniel Altmaier (champion)
4. (Peru) Juan Pablo Varillas (semifinals)
5. (Argentina) Juan Manuel Cerúndolo (second round)
6. (Italy) Franco Agamenone (second round)
7. (Argentina) Santiago Rodríguez Taverna (first round)
8. (Brazil) Felipe Meligeni Alves (second round)

== Draw ==
=== Key ===
- Q = Qualifier
- WC = Wild card
- LL = Lucky loser
- Alt = Alternate
- SE = Special exempt
- PR = Protected ranking
- ITF = ITF entry
- JE = Junior exempt
- w/o = Walkover
- r = Retired
- d = Defaulted
- SR = Special ranking

=== Finals ===
Semifinals
1	(Argentina) Federico Coria	6	2	7^{7}
4	(Peru) Juan Pablo Varillas	4	6	6^{4}
3	(Germany) Daniel Altmaier	7^{7}	6
Q	(Italy) Marco Cecchinato	6^{4}	4

Final
1	(Argentina) Federico Coria	2	4
3	(Germany) Daniel Altmaier	6	6

=== Top half ===
First round
1	(Argentina) F Coria	6	7^{8}
(Argentina) F Comesaña	2	6^{6}
Alt	(Serbia) N Milojević	6^{1}	2
(Argentina) F Díaz Acosta	7^{7}	6
Alt	(Spain) N Sánchez Izquierdo	1	6^{8}
(Brazil) M Pucinelli de Almeida	6	7^{10}
Q	(Argentina) Juan Ignacio Galarza	4	6^{3}
8	(Brazil) F Meligeni Alves	6	7^{7}
4	(Peru) JP Varillas	6	6
Q	(Brazil) E Ribeiro	2	1
WC	(Ecuador) Á Guillén Meza	6	6
WC	(Ecuador) A Andrade	4	3
PR	(India) S Nagal	6	6
(Brazil) D Dutra da Silva	2	1
(Argentina) N Kicker	6	6
7	(Argentina) S Rodríguez Taverna	1	4

Second round
1	(Argentina) F Coria	3	6	7^{7}
(Argentina) F Díaz Acosta	6	1	6^{2}
(Brazil) M Pucinelli de Almeida	6	6
8	(Brazil) F Meligeni Alves	3	4
4	(Peru) JP Varillas	6	7^{7}
WC	(Ecuador) A Guillén Meza	1	6^{3}
PR	(India) S Nagal	1	6	5
(Argentina) N Kicker	6	3	7

Quarterfinals
1	(Argentina) F Coria	6	6
(Brazil) M Pucinelli de Almeida	4	4
4	(Peru) JP Varillas	6	6
(Argentina) N Kicker	1	3

Semifinals
1	(Argentina) F Coria	6	2	7^{7}
4	(Peru) JP Varillas	4	6	6^{4}

=== Bottom half ===
First round
6	(Italy) F Agamenone	7	6
WC	(Ecuador) C March	5	1
(Argentina) H Casanova	1	7^{7}	5
(Netherlands) J de Jong	6	6^{5}	7
Alt	(Ecuador) R Quiroz	3	6^{2}
(Argentina) JB Torres	6	7^{7}
Q	(Brazil) T Seyboth Wild	6	6^{5}	2
3	(Germany) D Altmaier	1	7^{7}	6
5	(Argentina) JM Cerúndolo	6	6
(Austria) G Melzer	4	2
(Argentina) TA Tirante	3	6^{5}
Q	(United Kingdom) J Choinski	6	7^{7}
Q	(Italy) M Cecchinato	6	6
Q	(Jamaica) B Bicknell	1	3
LL	(Argentina) RA Burruchaga	6^{3}	7	7
2	(Argentina) TM Etcheverry	7^{7}	5	5

Second round
6	(Italy) F Agamenone	2	6	4
(Netherlands) J de Jong	6	4	6
(Argentina) JB Torres	4	3
3	(Germany) D Altmaier	6	6
5	(Argentina) JM Cerúndolo	7^{7}	2	4
Q	(United Kingdom) J Choinski	6^{3}	6	6
Q	(Italy) M Cecchinato	6	2
LL	(Argentina) RA Burruchaga	1	0^{r}

Quarterfinals
(Netherlands) J de Jong	2	6	3
3	(Germany) D Altmaier	6	3	6
Q	(United Kingdom) J Choinski	1	3
Q	(Italy) M Cecchinato	6	6

Semifinals
3	(Germany) D Altmaier	7^{7}	6
Q	(Italy) M Cecchinato	6^{4}	4
