= 2011 Challenger Ciudad de Guayaquil – Singles =

Singles
- 2011 Challenger Ciudad de Guayaquil

Final
- Champion: (Italy) Matteo Viola
- Runner-up: (Argentina) Guido Pella
- Score: 6–4, 6–1

Events
Singles	Doubles
← 2010 ·	Challenger Ciudad de Guayaquil	· 2012 →

Paul Capdeville was the defending champion but decided not to participate.
Matteo Viola won the title, defeating Guido Pella 6–4, 6–1 in the final.

== Seeds ==
1. (Argentina) Diego Junqueira (first round)
2. (Brazil) João Souza (second round)
3. (Brazil) Rogério Dutra da Silva (second round)
4. (Spain) Rubén Ramírez Hidalgo (semifinals)
5. (United States) Wayne Odesnik (quarterfinals)
6. (Argentina) Máximo González (second round)
7. (Italy) Alessandro Giannessi (first round)
8. (Spain) Daniel Muñoz-de la Nava (first round)

== Draw ==
=== Key ===
- Q = Qualifier
- WC = Wild card
- LL = Lucky loser
- Alt = Alternate
- SE = Special exempt
- PR = Protected ranking
- ITF = ITF entry
- JE = Junior exempt
- w/o = Walkover
- r = Retired
- d = Defaulted
- SR = Special ranking

=== Finals ===
Semifinals
Q	(Argentina) Guido Pella	6	6
4	(Spain) Rubén Ramírez Hidalgo	4	1
(Italy) Matteo Viola	6	3	6
Q	(Portugal) Pedro Sousa	2	6	1

Final
Q	(Argentina) Guido Pella	4	1
(Italy) Matteo Viola	6	6

=== Top half ===
First round
1	(Argentina) D Junqueira	5	1
(Slovakia) P Červenák	7	6
(Argentina) JP Brzezicki	3	4
(Italy) G Naso	6	6
Q	(Argentina) Guido Pella	6	3	6
(Argentina) B Dabul	4	6	1
(Colombia) Eduardo Struvay	6	6
7	(Italy) A Giannessi	3	0
4	(Spain) R Ramírez Hidalgo	6	6
(Uruguay) M Felder	4	3
(Argentina) M Alund	6	7^{8}
(Brazil) F Romboli	2	6^{6}
(Argentina) S Decoud	6	4	6
Q	(Argentina) Guillermo Duran	1	6	4
WC	(Ecuador) D Hidalgo	3	4
5	(United States) W Odesnik	6	6

Second round
(Slovakia) P Červenák	6	7^{7}
(Italy) G Naso	3	6^{5}
Q	(Argentina) Guido Pella	3	6	6
(Colombia) Eduardo Struvay	6	1	2
4	(Spain) R Ramírez Hidalgo	6	6^{11}	6
(Argentina) M Alund	3	7^{13}	1
(Argentina) S Decoud	4	6	2
5	(United States) W Odesnik	6	4	6

Quarterfinals
(Slovakia) P Červenák	6^{3}	4
Q	(Argentina) Guido Pella	7^{7}	6
4	(Spain) R Ramírez Hidalgo	2	6	6
5	(United States) W Odesnik	6	1	1

Semifinals
Q	(Argentina) Guido Pella	6	6
4	(Spain) R Ramírez Hidalgo	4	1

=== Bottom half ===
First round
8	(Spain) D Muñoz-de la Nava	4	6^{1}
WC	(Ecuador) JC Campozano	6	7^{7}
Q	(Portugal) L Tavares	3	5
(Argentina) A Molteni	6	7
(Italy) M Viola	6	6
(Portugal) G Elias	1	2
LL	(Argentina) G Andreozzi	1	2
3	(Brazil) R Dutra da Silva	6	6
6	(Argentina) M González	6	7
LL	(Ecuador) I Endara	4	6^{1}
WC	(Ecuador) R Quiroz	4	6	4
(Argentina) P Galdón	6	0	6
Q	(Portugal) P Sousa	7	6
LL	(Colombia) JS Gómez	5	2
(France) Axel Michon	2	7^{8}	4
2	(Brazil) J Souza	6	6^{6}	6

Second round
WC	(Ecuador) JC Campozano	7	5	5
(Argentina) A Molteni	5	7	7
(Italy) M Viola	6	6
3	(Brazil) R Dutra da Silva	4	3
6	(Argentina) M González	6	4	4
(Argentina) P Galdón	3	6	6
Q	(Portugal) P Sousa	4	6	6
2	(Brazil) J Souza	6	2	1

Quarterfinals
(Argentina) A Molteni	4	4
(Italy) M Viola	6	6
(Argentina) P Galdón	6	5	6^{4}
Q	(Portugal) P Sousa	0	7	7^{7}

Semifinals
(Italy) M Viola	6	3	6
Q	(Portugal) P Sousa	2	6	1
