= 2009 Challenger Ciudad de Guayaquil – Singles =

Singles
- 2009 Challenger Ciudad de Guayaquil

Final
- Champion: (Ecuador) Nicolás Lapentti
- Runner-up: (Colombia) Santiago Giraldo
- Score: 6–2, 2–6, 7–6(4)

Events
Singles	Doubles
← 2008 ·	Challenger Ciudad de Guayaquil	· 2010 →

Sergio Roitman, the defending champion, lost to Martín Alund already in the first round.
Nicolás Lapentti defeated Santiago Giraldo 6–2, 2–6, 7–6(4) in the final match.

== Seeds ==
1. (Colombia) Santiago Giraldo (final)
2. (Ecuador) Nicolás Lapentti (champion)
3. (Portugal) Rui Machado (quarterfinals)
4. (Chile) Nicolás Massú (first round)
5. (Argentina) Sebastián Decoud (first round)
6. (Argentina) Sergio Roitman (first round)
7. (Brazil) Júlio Silva (quarterfinals)
8. (Argentina) Brian Dabul (quarterfinals)

== Draw ==
=== Key ===
- Q = Qualifier
- WC = Wild card
- LL = Lucky loser
- Alt = Alternate
- ITF = ITF entry
- PR = Protected ranking
- SR = Special ranking
- SE = Special exempt
- JE = Junior exempt
- JR = Junior Accelerator Programme entrant
- CO = College Accelerator Programme entrant
- NG = Next Gen Accelerator Program entrant
- w/o = Walkover
- r = Retired
- d = Defaulted

=== Finals ===
Semifinals
1	(Colombia) Santiago Giraldo	6	6^{3}	6
(Argentina) Eduardo Schwank	2	7	3
Q	(Germany) Lars Pörschke	1	6^{5}
2	(Ecuador) Nicolás Lapentti	6	7

Final
1	(Colombia) Santiago Giraldo	2	6	6^{4}
2	(Ecuador) Nicolás Lapentti	6	2	7

=== Top half ===
First round
1	(Colombia) S Giraldo	6	6
WC	(Ecuador) E Gómez	2	2
(Ecuador) G Lapentti	4	6	6
Q	(Brazil) R Dutra da Silva	6	4	3
(Argentina) C Berlocq	0	2
(Austria) A Haider-Maurer	6	6
(Monaco) B Balleret	0	1
7	(Brazil) J Silva	6	6
4	(Chile) N Massú	4	2
Q	(Argentina) G Pella	6	6
(France) G Rufin	2	6^{3}
(Argentina) E Schwank	6	7
Q	(Portugal) P Sousa	7	6
(Argentina) D Junqueira	5	1
(Uruguay) M Felder	6^{5}	6	7
5	(Argentina) S Decoud	7	2	5

Second round
1	(Colombia) S Giraldo	6	1	6
(Ecuador) G Lapentti	3	6	4
(Austria) A Haider-Maurer	3	2
7	(Brazil) J Silva	6	6
Q	(Argentina) G Pella	3	4
(Argentina) E Schwank	6	6
Q	(Portugal) P Sousa	6	6
(Uruguay) M Felder	2	1

Quarterfinals
1	(Colombia) S Giraldo	6	0	6
7	(Brazil) J Silva	3	6	4
(Argentina) E Schwank	3	6	6
Q	(Portugal) P Sousa	6	1	3

Semifinals
1	(Colombia) S Giraldo	6	6^{3}	6
(Argentina) E Schwank	2	7	3

=== Bottom half ===
First round
6	(Argentina) S Roitman	2	3
(Argentina) M Alund	6	6
Q	(Germany) L Pörschke	3	6	6
(Colombia) C Salamanca	6	4	3
WC	(Argentina) M Zabaleta	6	6
WC	(Ecuador) R Quiroz	3	0
(Argentina) J-M Aranguren	6	3	1
3	(Portugal) R Machado	0	6	6
8	(Argentina) B Dabul	6	3	6
(Argentina) G Gaudio	2	6	1
(Brazil) R Hocevar	6	6
(Chile) J Aguilar	3	3
(Spain) C Poch-Gradin	6	6
WC	(Russia) D Sirota	0	0
(Brazil) J Souza	6	2	5
2	(Ecuador) N Lapentti	2	6	7

Second round
(Argentina) M Alund	3	6	4
Q	(Germany) L Pörschke	6	2	6
WC	(Argentina) M Zabaleta	1	2
3	(Portugal) R Machado	6	6
8	(Argentina) B Dabul	6	6
(Brazil) R Hocevar	1	1
(Spain) C Poch-Gradin	4	4
2	(Ecuador) N Lapentti	6	6

Quarterfinals
Q	(Germany) L Pörschke	7	6
3	(Portugal) R Machado	6^{5}	4
8	(Argentina) B Dabul	2	2
2	(Ecuador) N Lapentti	6	6

Semifinals
Q	(Germany) L Pörschke	1	6^{5}
2	(Ecuador) N Lapentti	6	7
