= 2011 Challenger Ciudad de Guayaquil – Doubles =

Doubles
- 2011 Challenger Ciudad de Guayaquil

Final
- Champions: (Ecuador) Júlio César Campozano (Ecuador) Roberto Quiroz
- Runners-up: (Uruguay) Marcel Felder (Brazil) Rodrigo Grilli
- Score: 6–4, 6–1

Events
Singles	Doubles
← 2010 ·	Challenger Ciudad de Guayaquil	· 2012 →

Juan Sebastián Cabal and Robert Farah were the defending Champions, but both decided not to participate.
Júlio César Campozano and Roberto Quiroz won the title after defeating Marcel Felder and Rodrigo Grilli 6–4, 6–1 in the final.

== Seeds ==
1. (Spain) Daniel Muñoz-de la Nava / (Spain) Rubén Ramírez Hidalgo (first round)
2. (Uruguay) Marcel Felder / (Brazil) Rodrigo Grilli (final)
3. (Chinese Taipei) Hsieh Cheng-peng / (Chinese Taipei) Lee Hsin-han (first round)
4. (United States) Maciek Sykut / (United States) Dennis Zivkovic (first round)

== Draw ==
=== Key ===
- Q = Qualifier
- WC = Wild card
- LL = Lucky loser
- Alt = Alternate
- SE = Special exempt
- PR = Protected ranking
- ITF = ITF entry
- JE = Junior exempt
- w/o = Walkover
- r = Retired
- d = Defaulted
- SR = Special ranking

=== Draw ===
First round
1	(Spain) D Muñoz-de la Nava (Spain) R Ramírez Hidalgo	2	3
(Argentina) M González (Argentina) D Junqueira	6	6
Alt	(Uruguay) A Behar (Colombia) Eduardo Struvay	1	3
(Argentina) M Alund (Argentina) Guido Pella	6	6
4	(United States) M Sykut (United States) Dennis Zivkovic	6	3	[2]
WC	(Ecuador) JC Campozano (Ecuador) R Quiroz	1	6	[10]
WC	(Argentina) G Andreozzi (Ecuador) Walter Valarezo	6^{2}	7	[10]
(Argentina) S Decoud (Colombia) JS Gómez	7^{7}	5	[5]
(Mexico) Luis Díaz-Barriga (Ecuador) I Endara	5	4
(Argentina) Guillermo Duran (Argentina) A Molteni	7	6
(Italy) G Naso (Italy) Matteo Viola	6^{4}	6	[10]
3	(Chinese Taipei) C-p Hsieh (Chinese Taipei) H-h Lee	7^{7}	3	[4]
WC	(Argentina) Guillermo Carry (Ecuador) D Hidalgo	7^{7}	4	[10]
(Argentina) JP Brzezicki (Argentina) P Galdón	6^{1}	6	[5]
(Slovakia) P Červenák (Brazil) F Romboli	4	7^{7}	[6]
2	(Uruguay) M Felder (Brazil) Rodrigo Grilli	6	6^{2}	[10]

Quarterfinals
(Argentina) M González (Argentina) D Junqueira	6	6^{2}	[7]
(Argentina) M Alund (Argentina) G Pella	4	7^{7}	[10]
WC	(Ecuador) JC Campozano (Ecuador) R Quiroz	3	6	[10]
WC	(Argentina) G Andreozzi (Ecuador) W Valarezo	6	3	[7]
(Argentina) G Duran (Argentina) A Molteni	6	6
(Italy) G Naso (Italy) M Viola	1	4
WC	(Argentina) G Carry (Ecuador) D Hidalgo	5	1
2	(Uruguay) M Felder (Brazil) R Grilli	7	6

Semifinals
(Argentina) M Alund (Argentina) G Pella	6	4	[4]
WC	(Ecuador) JC Campozano (Ecuador) R Quiroz	2	6	[10]
(Argentina) G Duran (Argentina) A Molteni	1	3
2	(Uruguay) M Felder (Brazil) R Grilli	6	6

Finals
WC	(Ecuador) JC Campozano (Ecuador) R Quiroz	6	6
2	(Uruguay) M Felder (Brazil) R Grilli	4	1
