= 2010 Challenger Ciudad de Guayaquil – Doubles =

Doubles
- 2010 Challenger Ciudad de Guayaquil

Final
- Champions: (Colombia) Juan Sebastián Cabal (Colombia) Robert Farah
- Runners-up: (Brazil) Franco Ferreiro (Brazil) André Sá
- Score: 7–5, 7–6^{(7–3)}

Events
Singles	Doubles
← 2009 ·	Challenger Ciudad de Guayaquil	· 2011 →

Júlio César Campozano and Emilio Gómez were the defending champions, but lost to Jorge Aguilar and Paul Capdeville in the first round.
Juan Sebastián Cabal and Robert Farah won the final against Franco Ferreiro and André Sá 7–5, 7–6^{(7–3)}.

== Seeds ==
1. (Brazil) Franco Ferreiro / (Brazil) André Sá (final)
2. (Dominican Republic) Víctor Estrella / (Mexico) Santiago González (semifinals)
3. (Brazil) Rogério Dutra da Silva / (Brazil) Ricardo Hocevar (quarterfinals, withdrew)
4. (Argentina) Diego Junqueira / (Argentina) Martín Vassallo Argüello (quarterfinals)

== Draw ==
=== Key ===
- Q = Qualifier
- WC = Wild card
- LL = Lucky loser
- Alt = Alternate
- SE = Special exempt
- PR = Protected ranking
- ITF = ITF entry
- JE = Junior exempt
- w/o = Walkover
- r = Retired
- d = Defaulted
- SR = Special ranking

=== Draw ===
First round
1	(Brazil) F Ferreiro (Brazil) A Sá	6	6
WC	(Ecuador) Galo Barrezueta (Ecuador) Alejandro José Gómez Estrada	2	1
(France) A Gensse (France) É Prodon	6	7
(Italy) Andrea Arnaboldi (Italy) G Naso	2	6^{3}
3	(Brazil) R Dutra da Silva (Brazil) R Hocevar	6	6
WC	(Ecuador) Arturo Altamirano (United States) E Nunez	4	2
(Chile) J Aguilar (Chile) P Capdeville	7	4	[10]
(Ecuador) JC Campozano (Ecuador) E Gómez	6^{1}	6	[4]
WC	(Ecuador) D Hidalgo (Ecuador) R Quiroz	3	3
(Colombia) JS Cabal (Colombia) R Farah	6	6
(Argentina) M Alund (Argentina) F Bagnis	7	2	[11]
4	(Argentina) D Junqueira (Argentina) M Vassallo Argüello	6^{3}	6	[13]
(Ecuador) I Endara (Ecuador) Walter Valarezo	3	2
(Portugal) P Sousa (Portugal) L Tavares	6	6
(Colombia) A González (Colombia) C Salamanca	2	2
2	(Dominican Republic) V Estrella (Mexico) S González	6	6

Quarterfinals
1	(Brazil) F Ferreiro (Brazil) A Sá	2	6	[10]
(France) A Gensse (France) É Prodon	6	3	[5]
3	(Brazil) R Dutra da Silva (Brazil) R Hocevar	w/o
(Chile) J Aguilar (Chile) P Capdeville
(Colombia) JS Cabal (Colombia) R Farah	6	6
4	(Argentina) D Junqueira (Argentina) M Vassallo Argüello	3	1
(Portugal) P Sousa (Portugal) L Tavares	1	2
2	(Dominican Republic) V Estrella (Mexico) S González	6	6

Semifinals
1	(Brazil) F Ferreiro (Brazil) A Sá	7	6
(Chile) J Aguilar (Chile) P Capdeville	5	2
(Colombia) JS Cabal (Colombia) R Farah	6	6
2	(Dominican Republic) V Estrella (Mexico) S González	3	4

Final
1	(Brazil) F Ferreiro (Brazil) A Sá	5	6^{3}
(Colombia) JS Cabal (Colombia) R Farah	7	7
