= 2017 Challenger Ciudad de Guayaquil =

- Date: 30 October – 4 November
- Edition: 13th
- Surface: Clay
- Location: Guayaquil, Ecuador

Champions

Singles
- (Austria) Gerald Melzer

Doubles
- (El Salvador) Marcelo Arévalo / (Mexico) Miguel Ángel Reyes-Varela
← 2016 ·	Challenger Ciudad de Guayaquil	· 2018 →

The 2017 Challenger Ciudad de Guayaquil was a professional tennis tournament played on clay courts. It was the thirteenth edition of the tournament which was part of the 2017 ATP Challenger Tour. It took place in Guayaquil, Ecuador between October 30 and November 4, 2017.

== Singles main-draw entrants ==
=== Seeds ===
Country	Player	Rank^{1}	Seed
DOM	Víctor Estrella Burgos	80	1
ARG	Nicolás Kicker	86	2
ESP	Roberto Carballés Baena	99	3
ITA	Marco Cecchinato	108	4
ARG	Carlos Berlocq	117	5
POR	Gastão Elias	128	6
AUT	Gerald Melzer	138	7
NOR	Casper Ruud	139	8

- ^{1} Rankings are as of 23 October 2017.

=== Other entrants ===
The following players received wildcards into the singles main draw:

- (Ecuador) Emilio Gómez
- (Dominican Republic) José Hernández-Fernández
- (Ecuador) Roberto Quiroz
- (Peru) Juan Pablo Varillas

The following players received entry as alternates:

- (Bolivia) Hugo Dellien
- (Brazil) João Souza

The following players received entry from the qualifying draw:

- (Uruguay) Martín Cuevas
- (Argentina) Juan Pablo Ficovich
- (Bulgaria) Dimitar Kuzmanov
- (Chile) Gonzalo Lama

== Champions ==
=== Singles ===
- (Austria) Gerald Melzer def. (Argentina) Facundo Bagnis 6–3, 6–1.

=== Doubles ===
- (El Salvador) Marcelo Arévalo / (Mexico) Miguel Ángel Reyes-Varela def. (Bolivia) Hugo Dellien / (Bolivia) Federico Zeballos 6–1, 6–7^{(7–9)}, [10–6].
