= 2016 Challenger Ciudad de Guayaquil – Doubles =

Doubles
- 2016 Challenger Ciudad de Guayaquil

Final
- Champions: (Uruguay) Ariel Behar (Brazil) Fabiano de Paula
- Runners-up: (El Salvador) Marcelo Arévalo (Peru) Sergio Galdós
- Score: 6–2, 6–4

Events
Singles	Doubles
- Challenger Ciudad de Guayaquil

Guillermo Durán and Andrés Molteni were the defending champions but only Molteni chose to defend his title, partnering Guido Andreozzi. Molteni lost in the first round to Franco Agamenone and Federico Zeballos.

Ariel Behar and Fabiano de Paula won the title after defeating Marcelo Arévalo and Sergio Galdós 6–2, 6–4 in the final.

== Seeds ==
1. (El Salvador) Marcelo Arévalo / (Peru) Sergio Galdós (final)
2. (Argentina) Guido Andreozzi / (Argentina) Andrés Molteni (first round)
3. (Portugal) Gastão Elias / (Brazil) Fabrício Neis (first round)
4. (Uruguay) Marcel Felder / (Chile) Hans Podlipnik (semifinals)

== Draw ==
Key

- Q = Qualifier
- WC = Wild card
- LL = Lucky loser
- Alt = Alternate
- ITF = ITF entry
- PR = Protected ranking
- SR = Special ranking
- SE = Special exempt
- JE = Junior exempt
- JR = Junior Accelerator Programme entrant
- CO = College Accelerator Programme entrant
- NG = Next Gen Accelerator Program entrant
- w/o = Walkover
- r = Retired
- d = Defaulted

First round
1	(El Salvador) M Arévalo (Peru) S Galdós	6	6
(Austria) M Linzer (Brazil) J Souza	1	0
(Ecuador) E Gómez (Ecuador) R Quiroz	1	4
(Brazil) F Romboli (Brazil) C Zampieri	6	6
3	(Portugal) G Elias (Brazil) F Neis	6	2	[9]
(Colombia) A Falla (Colombia) E Struvay	3	6	[11]
(Venezuela) LD Martínez (Argentina) A Velotti	7	6
(Brazil) A Ghem (Brazil) E Russi Assumpção	5	2
(Brazil) D Dutra da Silva (Brazil) R Dutra Silva	0^{r}
(Brazil) P Bernardi (Brazil) G Clezar	1
(France) M Janvier (Poland) K Majchrzak	0	3
4	(Uruguay) M Felder (Chile) H Podlipnik	6	6
(Uruguay) A Behar (Brazil) F de Paula	6	7
WC	(Ecuador) G Escobar (Argentina) JI Londero	2	5
(Argentina) F Agamenone (Bolivia) F Zeballos	1	6	[10]
2	(Argentina) G Andreozzi (Argentina) A Molteni	6	3	[3]

Quarterfinals
1	(El Salvador) M Arévalo (Peru) S Galdós	6	7^{7}
(Brazil) F Romboli (Brazil) C Zampieri	4	6^{1}
(Colombia) A Falla (Colombia) E Struvay	6	2	[6]
(Venezuela) LD Martínez (Argentina) A Velotti	2	6	[10]
(Brazil) P Bernardi (Brazil) G Clezar	2	2
4	(Uruguay) M Felder (Chile) H Podlipnik	6	6
(Uruguay) A Behar (Brazil) F de Paula	6	7^{7}
(Argentina) F Agamenone (Bolivia) F Zeballos	2	6^{2}

Semifinals
1	(El Salvador) M Arévalo (Peru) S Galdós	6	7
(Venezuela) LD Martínez (Argentina) A Velotti	3	5
4	(Uruguay) M Felder (Chile) H Podlipnik	1	6	[3]
(Uruguay) A Behar (Brazil) F de Paula	6	3	[10]

Final
1	(El Salvador) M Arévalo (Peru) S Galdós	2	4
(Uruguay) A Behar (Brazil) F de Paula	6	6
