= 2022 Challenger Ciudad de Guayaquil =

- Date: 31 October – 6 November
- Edition: 18th
- Surface: Clay
- Location: Guayaquil, Ecuador

Champions

Singles
- (Germany) Daniel Altmaier

Doubles
- (Argentina) Guido Andreozzi / (Argentina) Guillermo Durán
← 2021 ·	Challenger Ciudad de Guayaquil	· 2023 →

The 2022 Challenger Ciudad de Guayaquil was a professional tennis tournament played on clay courts. It was the 18th edition of the tournament which was part of the 2022 ATP Challenger Tour. It took place in Guayaquil, Ecuador between 31 October and 6 November 2022.

== Singles main-draw entrants ==
=== Seeds ===
Country	Player	Rank^{1}	Seed
ARG	Federico Coria	73	1
ARG	Tomás Martín Etcheverry	89	2
GER	Daniel Altmaier	106	3
PER	Juan Pablo Varillas	121	4
ARG	Juan Manuel Cerúndolo	136	5
ITA	Franco Agamenone	159	6
ARG	Santiago Rodríguez Taverna	162	7
BRA	Felipe Meligeni Alves	169	8

- ^{1} Rankings are as of 24 October 2022.

=== Other entrants ===
The following players received wildcards into the singles main draw:

- (Ecuador) Andrés Andrade
- (Ecuador) Álvaro Guillén Meza
- (Ecuador) Cayetano March

The following player received entry into the singles main draw using a protected ranking:

- (India) Sumit Nagal

The following players received entry into the singles main draw as alternates:

- (Serbia) Nikola Milojević
- (Ecuador) Roberto Quiroz
- (Spain) Nikolás Sánchez Izquierdo

The following players received entry from the qualifying draw:

- (Jamaica) Blaise Bicknell
- (Italy) Marco Cecchinato
- (United Kingdom) Jan Choinski
- (Argentina) Juan Ignacio Galarza
- (Brazil) Eduardo Ribeiro
- (Brazil) Thiago Seyboth Wild

The following player received entry as a lucky loser:

- (Argentina) Román Andrés Burruchaga

== Champions ==
=== Singles ===
- (Germany) Daniel Altmaier def. (Argentina) Federico Coria 6–2, 6–4.

=== Doubles ===
- (Argentina) Guido Andreozzi / (Argentina) Guillermo Durán def. (Argentina) Facundo Díaz Acosta / (Venezuela) Luis David Martínez 6–0, 6–4.
