= 2012 Challenger Ciudad de Guayaquil =

- Date: 5 – 10 November
- Edition: 8th
- Surface: Clay
- Location: Guayaquil, Ecuador

Champions

Singles
- (Argentina) Leonardo Mayer

Doubles
- (Argentina) Martín Alund / (Argentina) Facundo Bagnis
← 2011 ·	Challenger Ciudad de Guayaquil	· 2013 →

The 2012 Challenger Ciudad de Guayaquil was a professional tennis tournament played on clay courts. It was the eighth edition of the tournament, which was part of the 2012 ATP Challenger Tour. It took place in Guayaquil, Ecuador between 5 and 10 November 2012.

== Singles main draw entrants ==
=== Seeds ===
Country	Player	Rank^{1}	Seed
ARG	Leonardo Mayer	71	1
ITA	Paolo Lorenzi	76	2
ESP	Rubén Ramírez Hidalgo	98	3
ARG	Guido Pella	113	4
ARG	Martín Alund	126	5
USA	Wayne Odesnik	138	6
POR	Frederico Gil	142	7
RUS	Teymuraz Gabashvili	181	8

- ^{1} Rankings are as of October 29, 2012.

=== Other entrants ===
The following players received wildcards into the singles main draw:

- (Peru) Duilio Beretta
- (Ecuador) Alejandro Estrada
- (Ecuador) Emilio Gómez
- (Ecuador) Juan-Sebastian Vivanco

The following players received entry as a special exempt into the singles main draw:

- (Colombia) Juan Sebastián Cabal

The following players received entry from the qualifying draw:

- (Peru) Sergio Galdós
- (Mexico) Daniel Garza
- (Argentina) Mateo Nicolás Martínez
- (Argentina) Franco Scaravilli

== Champions ==
=== Singles ===
- (Argentina) Leonardo Mayer def. (Italy) Paolo Lorenzi, 6–2, 6–4

=== Doubles ===
- (Argentina) Martín Alund / (Argentina) Facundo Bagnis def. (Argentina) Leonardo Mayer / (Argentina) Martín Ríos-Benítez, 7–5, 7–6^{(7–5)}
