= 2017 Challenger Ciudad de Guayaquil – Singles =

Singles
- 2017 Challenger Ciudad de Guayaquil

Final
- Champion: (Austria) Gerald Melzer
- Runner-up: (Argentina) Facundo Bagnis
- Score: 6–3, 6–1

Events
Singles	Doubles
- Challenger Ciudad de Guayaquil

Nicolás Kicker was the defending champion but lost in the quarterfinals to Facundo Bagnis.

Gerald Melzer won the title after defeating Bagnis 6–3, 6–1 in the final.

== Seeds ==
1. (Dominican Republic) Víctor Estrella Burgos (second round)
2. (Argentina) Nicolás Kicker (quarterfinals)
3. (Spain) Roberto Carballés Baena (first round)
4. (Italy) Marco Cecchinato (first round)
5. (Argentina) Carlos Berlocq (second round)
6. (Portugal) Gastão Elias (semifinals)
7. (Austria) Gerald Melzer (champion)
8. (Norway) Casper Ruud (second round)

== Draw ==
Key

- Q = Qualifier
- WC = Wild card
- LL = Lucky loser
- Alt = Alternate
- ITF = ITF entry
- PR = Protected ranking
- SR = Special ranking
- SE = Special exempt
- JE = Junior exempt
- JR = Junior Accelerator Programme entrant
- CO = College Accelerator Programme entrant
- NG = Next Gen Accelerator Program entrant
- w/o = Walkover
- r = Retired
- d = Defaulted

=== Finals ===
Semifinals
Alt	(Bolivia) Hugo Dellien	0	4
7	(Austria) Gerald Melzer	6	6
6	(Portugal) Gastão Elias	5	4
(Argentina) Facundo Bagnis	7	6

Final
7	(Austria) Gerald Melzer	6	6
(Argentina) Facundo Bagnis	3	1

=== Top half ===
First round
1	(Dominican Republic) V Estrella Burgos	3	6	6
WC	(Ecuador) E Gómez	6	1	4
Alt	(Brazil) J Souza	3	6^{3}
(El Salvador) M Arévalo	6	7^{7}
(Hungary) A Balázs	4	4
Alt	(Bolivia) H Dellien	6	6
(Argentina) F Coria	5	6^{6}
5	(Argentina) C Berlocq	7	7^{8}
4	(Italy) M Cecchinato	3	2
(Slovenia) B Rola	6	6
(Argentina) R Olivo	5	0^{r}
WC	(Ecuador) R Quiroz	7	3
(Argentina) A Collarini	3	2^{r}
Q	(Uruguay) M Cuevas	6	4
Q	(Argentina) JP Ficovich	2	1
7	(Austria) G Melzer	6	6

Second round
1	(Dominican Republic) V Estrella Burgos	4	2
(El Salvador) M Arévalo	6	6
Alt	(Bolivia) H Dellien	6	6
5	(Argentina) C Berlocq	4	4
(Slovenia) B Rola	2	7^{7}	6^{7}
WC	(Ecuador) R Quiroz	6	6^{1}	7^{9}
Q	(Uruguay) M Cuevas	6	2	2
7	(Austria) G Melzer	3	6	6

Quarterfinals
(El Salvador) M Arévalo	6^{3}	6^{3}
Alt	(Bolivia) H Dellien	7^{7}	7^{7}
WC	(Ecuador) R Quiroz	1	4
7	(Austria) G Melzer	6	6

Semifinals
Alt	(Bolivia) H Dellien	0	4
7	(Austria) G Melzer	6	6

=== Bottom half ===
First round
6	(Portugal) G Elias	6	7^{7}
(Slovakia) J Kovalík	4	6^{5}
(Portugal) J Domingues	3	6	6
(Portugal) G Oliveira	6	2	3
Q	(Chile) G Lama	7	6
WC	(Peru) JP Varillas	5	3
(Argentina) G Andreozzi	3	7	6
3	(Spain) R Carballés Baena	6	5	2
8	(Norway) C Ruud	6	6
(Argentina) M González	4	4
(Argentina) F Bagnis	7^{7}	2
(Colombia) DE Galán	6^{3}	2^{r}
(Spain) Í Cervantes	6	4	0
WC	(Dominican Republic) J Hernández-Fernández	3	6	6
Q	(Bulgaria) D Kuzmanov	4	4
2	(Argentina) N Kicker	6	6

Second round
6	(Portugal) G Elias	6	6^{6}	6
(Portugal) J Domingues	3	7^{8}	2
Q	(Chile) G Lama	4	2
(Argentina) G Andreozzi	6	6
8	(Norway) C Ruud	1	2
(Argentina) F Bagnis	6	6
WC	(Dominican Republic) J Hernández-Fernández	6^{6}	0
2	(Argentina) N Kicker	7^{8}	6

Quarterfinals
6	(Portugal) G Elias	6	6
(Argentina) G Andreozzi	3	3
(Argentina) F Bagnis	6	6
2	(Argentina) N Kicker	3	4

Semifinals
6	(Portugal) G Elias	5	4
(Argentina) F Bagnis	7	6
