= 2014 Challenger Ciudad de Guayaquil – Doubles =

Doubles
- 2014 Challenger Ciudad de Guayaquil

Final
- Champions: (Argentina) Máximo González (Argentina) Guido Pella
- Runners-up: (Spain) Pere Riba (Spain) Jordi Samper-Montaña
- Score: 2–6, 7–6^{(7–3)}, [10–5]

Events
Singles	Doubles
- Challenger Ciudad de Guayaquil

Stephan Fransen and Wesley Koolhof were the defending champions, but chose not to participate.

Máximo González and Guido Pella won the title, defeating Pere Riba and Jordi Samper-Montaña in the final, 2–6, 7–6^{(7–3)}, [10–5].

== Seeds ==
1. (Argentina) ~~Diego Schwartzman~~ / (Argentina) ~~Horacio Zeballos~~ (withdrew)
2. (Argentina) Máximo González / (Argentina) Guido Pella (champions)
3. (Argentina) Martín Alund / (Argentina) Andrés Molteni (semifinals)
4. (Peru) Sergio Galdós / (Chile) Nicolás Jarry (semifinals)

== Draw ==
Key

- Q = Qualifier
- WC = Wild card
- LL = Lucky loser
- Alt = Alternate
- ITF = ITF entry
- PR = Protected ranking
- SR = Special ranking
- SE = Special exempt
- JE = Junior exempt
- JR = Junior Accelerator Programme entrant
- CO = College Accelerator Programme entrant
- NG = Next Gen Accelerator Program entrant
- w/o = Walkover
- r = Retired
- d = Defaulted

=== Draw ===
First round
Alt	(Italy) Enrico Becuzzi (Italy) P Lorenzi	1	1
(Poland) K Majchrzak (Poland) G Panfil	6	6
(Spain) P Riba (Spain) JS Montaña	6	4	[10]
WC	(Ecuador) I Endara (Argentina) Alan Kohen	1	6	[5]
4	(Peru) S Galdós (Chile) N Jarry	6	7^{7}
(Argentina) F Bagnis (Argentina) P Cachin	4	6^{5}
(Spain) R Carballés Baena (Chile) H Podlipnik-Castillo	6	6^{4}	[10]
(Ecuador) Simon Bustamante (Ecuador) Diego Quiroz	0	7^{7}	[3]
(Uruguay) A Behar (Chile) G Lama	6	6^{1}	[5]
(Ecuador) G Escobar (Australia) J Kubler	1	7^{7}	[10]
(Ecuador) Gabriel Cucalon (Ecuador) Jorman Reyes	4	3
3	(Argentina) M Alund (Argentina) A Molteni	6	6
(Spain) D Muñoz de la Nava (Argentina) R Olivo	6	6
(Dominican Republic) J Hernández (Argentina) JI Londero	3	4
(Argentina) G Andreozzi (Argentina) F Argüello	5	6	[1]
2	(Argentina) M González (Argentina) G Pella	7	3	[10]

Quarterfinals
(Poland) K Majchrzak (Poland) G Panfil	3	6^{4}
(Spain) P Riba (Spain) JS Montaña	6	7^{7}
4	(Peru) S Galdós (Chile) N Jarry	4	6	[13]
(Spain) R Carballés Baena (Chile) H Podlipnik-Castillo	6	4	[11]
(Ecuador) G Escobar (Australia) J Kubler	4	4
3	(Argentina) M Alund (Argentina) A Molteni	6	6
(Spain) D Muñoz de la Nava (Argentina) R Olivo	3	2
2	(Argentina) M González (Argentina) G Pella	6	6

Semifinals
(Spain) P Riba (Spain) JS Montaña	6	6^{5}	[11]
4	(Peru) S Galdós (Chile) N Jarry	3	7^{7}	[9]
3	(Argentina) M Alund (Argentina) A Molteni	6	5	[7]
2	(Argentina) M González (Argentina) G Pella	3	7	[10]

Final
(Spain) P Riba (Spain) JS Montaña	6	6^{3}	[5]
2	(Argentina) M González (Argentina) G Pella	2	7^{7}	[10]
