= 2013 Challenger Ciudad de Guayaquil – Singles =

Singles
- 2013 Challenger Ciudad de Guayaquil

Final
- Champion: (Argentina) Leonardo Mayer
- Runner-up: (Portugal) Pedro Sousa
- Score: 6–4, 7–5

Events
Singles	Doubles
- Challenger Ciudad de Guayaquil

Leonardo Mayer defended his title over Portuguese Pedro Sousa 6–4, 7–5.

== Seeds ==
1. (Argentina) Leonardo Mayer (champion)
2. (Italy) Paolo Lorenzi (first round)
3. (Argentina) Diego Sebastián Schwartzman (first round)
4. (United States) Wayne Odesnik (second round)
5. (Chile) Paul Capdeville (second round)
6. (Portugal) Gastão Elias (first round)
7. (Argentina) Máximo González (second round)
8. (Dominican Republic) Víctor Estrella Burgos (quarterfinals)

== Draw ==
Key

- Q = Qualifier
- WC = Wild card
- LL = Lucky loser
- Alt = Alternate
- ITF = ITF entry
- PR = Protected ranking
- SR = Special ranking
- SE = Special exempt
- JE = Junior exempt
- JR = Junior Accelerator Programme entrant
- CO = College Accelerator Programme entrant
- NG = Next Gen Accelerator Program entrant
- w/o = Walkover
- r = Retired
- d = Defaulted

=== Finals ===
Semifinals
1	(Argentina) Leonardo Mayer	6	3	6
(Italy) Gianluigi Quinzi	3	6	1
(Portugal) Pedro Sousa	6	6
(Venezuela) David Souto	3	4

Final
1	(Argentina) Leonardo Mayer	6	7
(Portugal) Pedro Sousa	4	5

=== Top half ===
First round
1	(Argentina) L Mayer	6	6
Q	(Netherlands) W Koolhof	4	2
Q	(Uruguay) M Cuevas	6	4	7
(Colombia) N Barrientos	3	6	5
(Ecuador) E Gómez	6	6
(Argentina) M Estévez	1	4
Q	(Argentina) N Kicker	6	4	4
7	(Argentina) M González	3	6	6
4	(United States) W Odesnik	7	6
(Ecuador) I Endara	5	1
WC	(Ecuador) G Escobar	2	6^{5}
(Austria) M Linzer	6	7^{7}
(Argentina) Gabriel Alejandro Hidalgo	4	4
(Bolivia) H Dellien	6	6
(Italy) G Quinzi	6	6
6	(Portugal) G Elias	2	0

Second round
1	(Argentina) L Mayer	7^{7}	6
Q	(Uruguay) M Cuevas	6^{5}	2
(Ecuador) E Gómez	6	6
7	(Argentina) M González	0	1
4	(United States) W Odesnik	6^{4}	6	4
(Austria) M Linzer	7^{7}	1	6
(Bolivia) H Dellien	1	2
(Italy) G Quinzi	6	6

Quarterfinals
1	(Argentina) L Mayer	6	6
(Ecuador) E Gómez	2	4
(Austria) M Linzer	2	6	2
(Italy) G Quinzi	6	3	6

Semifinals
1	(Argentina) L Mayer	6	3	6
(Italy) G Quinzi	3	6	1

=== Bottom half ===
First round
8	(Dominican Republic) V Estrella Burgos	6	6
(Venezuela) R Rodriguez	4	2
(Brazil) F Neis	2	6	2
Q	(Argentina) G Durán	6	2	6
WC	(Ecuador) R Quiroz	6	6
WC	(Ecuador) Jorman Reyes	3	2
(Portugal) P Sousa	6	5	7
3	(Argentina) DS Schwartzman	2	7	5
5	(Chile) P Capdeville	6	6
(Chile) G Lama	4	3
(Argentina) P Galdón	3	1
(Venezuela) D Souto	6	6
(Ecuador) JC Campozano	0	1
WC	(Ecuador) G Lapentti	6	6
(Argentina) JI Londero	6^{2}	6	7^{7}
2	(Italy) P Lorenzi	7^{7}	4	6^{3}

Second round
8	(Dominican Republic) V Estrella Burgos	6	6
Q	(Argentina) G Durán	4	3
WC	(Ecuador) R Quiroz	4	6	6^{6}
(Portugal) P Sousa	6	4	7^{8}
5	(Chile) P Capdeville	2	3
(Venezuela) D Souto	6	6
WC	(Ecuador) G Lapentti	4	6	5
(Argentina) JI Londero	6	2	1^{r}

Quarterfinals
8	(Dominican Republic) V Estrella Burgos	6^{4}	4
(Portugal) P Sousa	7^{7}	6
(Venezuela) D Souto	7^{7}	4	6
WC	(Ecuador) G Lapentti	6^{1}	6	3

Semifinals
(Portugal) P Sousa	6	6
(Venezuela) D Souto	3	4
