= 2018 Challenger Ciudad de Guayaquil – Doubles =

Doubles
- 2018 Challenger Ciudad de Guayaquil

Final
- Champions: (Argentina) Guillermo Durán; (Ecuador) Roberto Quiroz
- Runners-up: (Brazil) Thiago Monteiro; (Brazil) Fabrício Neis
- Score: 6–3, 6–2

Events
Singles	Doubles
- Challenger Ciudad de Guayaquil

Marcelo Arévalo and Miguel Ángel Reyes-Varela were the defending champions but chose not to defend their title.

Guillermo Durán and Roberto Quiroz won the title after defeating Thiago Monteiro and Fabrício Neis 6–3, 6–2 in the final.

== Seeds ==
1. (Uruguay) Ariel Behar / (Argentina) Andrés Molteni (quarterfinals)
2. (Uruguay) Martín Cuevas / (Uruguay) Pablo Cuevas (semifinals)
3. (Ecuador) Gonzalo Escobar / (Brazil) Fernando Romboli (first round)
4. (Argentina) Guillermo Durán / (Ecuador) Roberto Quiroz (champions)

== Draw ==
Key

- Q = Qualifier
- WC = Wild card
- LL = Lucky loser
- Alt = Alternate
- ITF = ITF entry
- PR = Protected ranking
- SR = Special ranking
- SE = Special exempt
- JE = Junior exempt
- JR = Junior Accelerator Programme entrant
- CO = College Accelerator Programme entrant
- NG = Next Gen Accelerator Program entrant
- w/o = Walkover
- r = Retired
- d = Defaulted

First round

Quarterfinals

Semifinals

Final

1
- (Uruguay) A Behar
- (Argentina) A Molteni
6
6

- (Belgium) A De Greef
- (Italy) L Giustino
3
3

1
- (Uruguay) A Behar
- (Argentina) A Molteni
2
6
[5]

WC
- (Colombia) José Daniel Bendeck
- (Colombia) C Rodríguez
6^{2}
3

- (Portugal) J Domingues
- (Portugal) G Elias
6
4
[10]

- (Portugal) J Domingues
- (Portugal) G Elias
7^{7}
6

- (Portugal) J Domingues
- (Portugal) G Elias

4
- (Argentina) G Durán
- (Ecuador) R Quiroz
w/o

4
- (Argentina) G Durán
- (Ecuador) R Quiroz
w/o

- (Serbia) P Krstin
- (Serbia) M Zekić

4
- (Argentina) G Durán
- (Ecuador) R Quiroz
6
7

WC
- (Ecuador) E Gómez
- (Ecuador) D Hidalgo
3
6
[9]

- (Argentina) F Agamenone
- (Argentina) F Argüello
1
5

- (Argentina) F Agamenone
- (Argentina) F Argüello
6
4
[11]

4
- (Argentina) G Durán
- (Ecuador) R Quiroz
6
6

- (Brazil) T Monteiro
- (Brazil) F Neis
6
6

- (Brazil) T Monteiro
- (Brazil) F Neis
3
2

- (Portugal) P Sousa
- (Netherlands) M Vervoort
2
1

- (Brazil) T Monteiro
- (Brazil) F Neis
w/o

- (Argentina) C Berlocq
- (Argentina) C Ugo Carabelli
3
6
[10]

- (Argentina) C Berlocq
- (Argentina) C Ugo Carabelli

3
- (Ecuador) G Escobar
- (Brazil) F Romboli
6
3
[8]

- (Brazil) T Monteiro
- (Brazil) F Neis
6
6

WC
- (Ecuador) I Endara
- (Ecuador) AC March
4
4

2
- (Uruguay) M Cuevas
- (Uruguay) P Cuevas
3
4

- (Argentina) T Lipovšek Puches
- (Bolivia) F Zeballos
6
6

- (Argentina) T Lipovšek Puches
- (Bolivia) F Zeballos
4
7
[5]

- (Argentina) F Bagnis
- (Peru) S Galdós
4
3

2
- (Uruguay) M Cuevas
- (Uruguay) P Cuevas
6
5
[10]

2
- (Uruguay) M Cuevas
- (Uruguay) P Cuevas
6
6
