= 2009 Challenger Ciudad de Guayaquil =

- Date: 9–15 November
- Edition: 5th
- Location: Guayaquil, Ecuador

Champions

Singles
- (Ecuador) Nicolás Lapentti

Doubles
- (Ecuador) Júlio César Campozano / (Ecuador) Emilio Gómez
← 2008 ·	Challenger Ciudad de Guayaquil	· 2010 →

The 2009 Challenger Ciudad de Guayaquil was a professional tennis tournament played on outdoor red clay courts. It was the fifth edition of the tournament which was part of the 2009 ATP Challenger Tour. It took place in Guayaquil, Ecuador between 9 and 15 November 2009.

== ATP entrants ==
=== Seeds ===
Country	Player	Rank^{1}	Seed
COL	Santiago Giraldo	111	1
ECU	Nicolás Lapentti	114	2
POR	Rui Machado	118	3
CHI	Nicolás Massú	133	4
ARG	Sebastián Decoud	145	5
ARG	Sergio Roitman	146	6
BRA	Júlio Silva	149	7
ARG	Brian Dabul	153	8

- Rankings are as of November 2, 2009.

=== Other entrants ===
The following players received wildcards into the singles main draw:

- (Ecuador) Emilio Gómez
- (Ecuador) Roberto Quiroz
- (Russia) Daniil Sirota
- (Argentina) Mariano Zabaleta

The following players received entry from the qualifying draw:

- (Brazil) Rogério Dutra da Silva
- (Argentina) Guido Pella
- (Germany) Lars Pörschke
- (Portugal) Pedro Sousa

== Champions ==
=== Singles ===
(Ecuador) Nicolás Lapentti def. (Colombia) Santiago Giraldo, 6–2, 2–6, 7–6(4)

=== Doubles ===
(Ecuador) Júlio César Campozano / (Ecuador) Emilio Gómez def. (Austria) Andreas Haider-Maurer / (Germany) Lars Pörschke, 6–7(2), 6–3, [10–8]
