= 2016 Challenger Ciudad de Guayaquil – Singles =

Singles
- 2016 Challenger Ciudad de Guayaquil

Final
- Champion: (Argentina) Nicolás Kicker
- Runner-up: (Belgium) Arthur De Greef
- Score: 6–3, 6–2

Events
Singles	Doubles
- Challenger Ciudad de Guayaquil

Gastão Elias was the defending champion but lost in the first round to Guilherme Clezar.

Nicolás Kicker won the title after defeating Arthur De Greef 6–3, 6–2 in the final.

== Seeds ==
1. (Portugal) Gastão Elias (first round)
2. (Argentina) Facundo Bagnis (quarterfinals)
3. (Argentina) Renzo Olivo (withdrew)
4. (Argentina) Carlos Berlocq (first round, retired)
5. (Dominican Republic) Víctor Estrella Burgos (first round)
6. (Colombia) Santiago Giraldo (first round)
7. (Brazil) Rogério Dutra Silva (first round)
8. (Brazil) João Souza (first round)
9. (United States) Ernesto Escobedo (second round)

== Draw ==
Key

- Q = Qualifier
- WC = Wild card
- LL = Lucky loser
- Alt = Alternate
- ITF = ITF entry
- PR = Protected ranking
- SR = Special ranking
- SE = Special exempt
- JE = Junior exempt
- JR = Junior Accelerator Programme entrant
- CO = College Accelerator Programme entrant
- NG = Next Gen Accelerator Program entrant
- w/o = Walkover
- r = Retired
- d = Defaulted

=== Finals ===
Semifinals
(Belgium) Arthur De Greef	7	7
(Argentina) Guido Andreozzi	5	5
(Argentina) Nicolás Kicker	6	6
Q	(Brazil) João Pedro Sorgi	3	1

Final
(Belgium) Arthur De Greef	3	2
(Argentina) Nicolás Kicker	6	6

=== Top half ===
First round
1	(Portugal) G Elias	2	6	3
(Brazil) G Clezar	6	3	6
(Portugal) P Sousa	1^{r}
(Belgium) A De Greef	3
(Colombia) E Struvay	2	0^{r}
(Brazil) C Zampieri	6	0
(France) M Bourgue	4	6	6
8	(Brazil) J Souza	6	0	2
4	(Argentina) C Berlocq	1	6	3^{r}
(Brazil) A Ghem	6	4	5
LL	(Austria) M Linzer	6	5
Q	(Chile) Bastián Malla	2	2^{r}
(Argentina) G Andreozzi	6	6^{4}	6
WC	(Ecuador) E Gómez	3	7^{7}	3
WC	(Ecuador) I Endara	7^{8}	6
7	(Brazil) R Dutra Silva	6^{6}	2

Second round
(Brazil) G Clezar	6	2	3
(Belgium) A De Greef	4	6	6
(Brazil) C Zampieri	3	1
(France) M Bourgue	6	6
(Brazil) A Ghem	6	6
LL	(Austria) M Linzer	3	2
(Argentina) G Andreozzi	7	6
WC	(Ecuador) I Endara	5	2

Quarterfinals
(Belgium) A De Greef	6	6
(France) M Bourgue	4	2
(Brazil) A Ghem	4	4
(Argentina) G Andreozzi	6	6

Semifinals
(Belgium) A De Greef	7	7
(Argentina) G Andreozzi	5	5

=== Bottom half ===
First round
6	(Colombia) S Giraldo	5	6	3
Q	(Colombia) DE Galán	7	3	6
Q	(Argentina) A Molteni	6	6
(Chile) C Garin	4	3
(Argentina) N Kicker	6	6
WC	(Ecuador) G Escobar	1	1
(Argentina) A Velotti	2	3
9	(United States) E Escobedo	6	6
5	(Dominican Republic) V Estrella Burgos	3	7^{7}	6^{7}
Q	(Brazil) JP Sorgi	6	6^{5}	7^{9}
WC	(Ecuador) R Quiroz	2	2
(Argentina) L Mayer	6	6
(Colombia) A Falla	6	5	3
(El Salvador) M Arévalo	4	7	6
(Dominican Republic) J Hernández	7	6^{4}	4
2	(Argentina) F Bagnis	5	7^{7}	6

Second round
Q	(Colombia) DE Galán	5	3
Q	(Argentina) A Molteni	7	6
(Argentina) N Kicker	3	6	6
9	(United States) E Escobedo	6	2	1
Q	(Brazil) JP Sorgi	6	1	6
(Argentina) L Mayer	3	6	1
(El Salvador) M Arévalo	2	6	4
2	(Argentina) F Bagnis	6	4	6

Quarterfinals
Q	(Argentina) A Molteni	3	0^{r}
(Argentina) N Kicker	6	3
Q	(Brazil) JP Sorgi	4	6	6
2	(Argentina) F Bagnis	6	4	4

Semifinals
(Argentina) N Kicker	6	6
Q	(Brazil) JP Sorgi	3	1
