= 2018 Challenger Ciudad de Guayaquil – Singles =

Singles
- 2018 Challenger Ciudad de Guayaquil

Final
- Champion: (Argentina) Guido Andreozzi
- Runner-up: (Portugal) Pedro Sousa
- Score: 7–5, 1–6, 6–4

Events
Singles	Doubles
- Challenger Ciudad de Guayaquil

Gerald Melzer was the defending champion but lost in the first round to Federico Coria.

Guido Andreozzi won the title after defeating Pedro Sousa 7–5, 1–6, 6–4 in the final.

== Seeds ==
1. (Uruguay) Pablo Cuevas (quarterfinals)
2. (Argentina) Federico Delbonis (withdrew)
3. (Argentina) Guido Andreozzi (champion)
4. (Chile) Christian Garín (withdrew)
5. (Italy) Paolo Lorenzi (second round)
6. (Brazil) Thiago Monteiro (first round)
7. (Bolivia) Hugo Dellien (second round)
8. (Argentina) Juan Ignacio Londero (quarterfinals)

== Draw ==
Key

- Q = Qualifier
- WC = Wild card
- LL = Lucky loser
- Alt = Alternate
- ITF = ITF entry
- PR = Protected ranking
- SR = Special ranking
- SE = Special exempt
- JE = Junior exempt
- JR = Junior Accelerator Programme entrant
- CO = College Accelerator Programme entrant
- NG = Next Gen Accelerator Program entrant
- w/o = Walkover
- r = Retired
- d = Defaulted

=== Finals ===
Semifinals
(Belgium) Arthur De Greef	5	2
(Portugal) Pedro Sousa	7	6
3	(Argentina) Guido Andreozzi	6	7^{10}
PR	(Colombia) Santiago Giraldo	4	6^{8}

Final
(Portugal) Pedro Sousa	5	6	4
3	(Argentina) Guido Andreozzi	7	1	6

=== Top half ===
First round
1	(Uruguay) P Cuevas	6	6
WC	(Ecuador) D Hidalgo	3	0
(Austria) G Melzer	2	4
Q	(Argentina) F Coria	6	6
(Colombia) DE Galán	4	0
(Belgium) A De Greef	6	6
WC	(Dominican Republic) J Hernández-Fernández	6	7^{7}
6	(Brazil) T Monteiro	1	6^{2}
LL	(United States) U Blanch	7	6
(Argentina) F Bagnis	5	4
(Argentina) F Argüello	4	6	6
(Brazil) G Clezar	6	2	1
WC	(Peru) N Álvarez	4	4
(Portugal) P Sousa	6	6
Q	(Brazil) T Seyboth Wild	6	3	4
7	(Bolivia) H Dellien	3	6	6

Second round
1	(Uruguay) P Cuevas	6	2	6
Q	(Argentina) F Coria	4	6	1
(Belgium) A De Greef	6	6
WC	(Dominican Republic) J Hernández-Fernández	0	4
LL	(United States) U Blanch	4	1
(Argentina) F Argüello	6	6
(Portugal) P Sousa	4	6	6
7	(Bolivia) H Dellien	6	1	4

Quarterfinals
1	(Uruguay) P Cuevas	5	3
(Belgium) A De Greef	7	6
(Argentina) F Argüello	6^{6}	3
(Portugal) P Sousa	7^{8}	6

Semifinals
(Belgium) A De Greef	5	2
(Portugal) P Sousa	7	6

=== Bottom half ===
First round
5	(Italy) P Lorenzi	6	6^{6}	7^{7}
Q	(Uruguay) M Cuevas	4	7^{8}	6^{5}
(Serbia) P Krstin	6	7^{7}
(Dominican Republic) R Cid Subervi	3	6^{3}
WC	(Ecuador) E Gómez	2	6	4
(Brazil) T Bellucci	6	3	6
(Argentina) C Berlocq	6^{6}	2
3	(Argentina) G Andreozzi	7^{8}	6
8	(Argentina) JI Londero	6	6
(Italy) L Giustino	2	4
Q	(Peru) JP Varillas	3	6	3
(Ecuador) R Quiroz	6	3	6
PR	(Colombia) S Giraldo	7	6
(Portugal) J Domingues	5	3
(Portugal) G Elias	6^{3}	6	1
LL	(Serbia) M Zekić	7^{7}	0	6

Second round
5	(Italy) P Lorenzi	6^{6}	2
(Serbia) P Krstin	7^{8}	6
(Brazil) T Bellucci	3	2
3	(Argentina) G Andreozzi	6	6
8	(Argentina) JI Londero	6^{5}	7^{9}	6
(Ecuador) R Quiroz	7^{7}	6^{7}	1
PR	(Colombia) S Giraldo	7	7
LL	(Serbia) M Zekić	5	5

Quarterfinals
(Serbia) P Krstin	4	2
3	(Argentina) G Andreozzi	6	6
8	(Argentina) JI Londero	7	6^{3}	6^{7}
PR	(Colombia) S Giraldo	5	7^{7}	7^{9}

Semifinals
3	(Argentina) G Andreozzi	6	7^{10}
PR	(Colombia) S Giraldo	4	6^{8}
