= 2014 Challenger Ciudad de Guayaquil – Singles =

Singles
- 2014 Challenger Ciudad de Guayaquil

Final
- Champion: (Uruguay) Pablo Cuevas
- Runner-up: (Italy) Paolo Lorenzi
- Score: Walkover

Events
Singles	Doubles
- Challenger Ciudad de Guayaquil

Leonardo Mayer was the two-time defending champion, but he did not participate that year.
Pablo Cuevas won the title, after Paolo Lorenzi withdrew from the final.

== Seeds ==
1. (Uruguay) Pablo Cuevas (champion)
2. (Italy) Paolo Lorenzi (final)
3. (Argentina) Diego Schwartzman (quarterfinals)
4. (Colombia) Alejandro González (first round)
5. (Brazil) João Souza (first round)
6. (Argentina) Horacio Zeballos (second round)
7. (Argentina) Máximo González (first round)
8. (Argentina) Facundo Bagnis (first round)

== Draw ==
Key

- Q = Qualifier
- WC = Wild card
- LL = Lucky loser
- Alt = Alternate
- ITF = ITF entry
- PR = Protected ranking
- SR = Special ranking
- SE = Special exempt
- JE = Junior exempt
- JR = Junior Accelerator Programme entrant
- CO = College Accelerator Programme entrant
- NG = Next Gen Accelerator Program entrant
- w/o = Walkover
- r = Retired
- d = Defaulted

=== Finals ===
Semifinals
1/WC	(Uruguay) Pablo Cuevas	6	6
(Argentina) Guido Pella	4	4
Q	(Argentina) Renzo Olivo	7^{7}	3	3
2	(Italy) Paolo Lorenzi	6^{5}	6	6

Finals
1/WC	(Uruguay) Pablo Cuevas	w/o
2	(Italy) Paolo Lorenzi

=== Top half ===
First round
1/WC	(Uruguay) P Cuevas	6	6
Q	(Poland) G Panfil	3	1
(Spain) R Carballés Baena	7	6
(Chile) N Jarry	5	3
(Chile) G Lama	6	7
WC	(Ecuador) G Escobar	4	5
(Argentina) F Argüello	6	6
7	(Argentina) M González	4	0
3	(Argentina) D Schwartzman	6	6
(Australia) J Kubler	4	2
Q	(Dominican Republic) J Hernández	5	6	6
(Chile) H Podlipnik-Castillo	7	4	2
(Argentina) G Pella	5	6	6
(Argentina) A Molteni	7	3	2
(Spain) D Muñoz de la Nava	6	3	7
8	(Argentina) F Bagnis	4	6	5

Second round
1/WC	(Uruguay) P Cuevas	7^{7}	6
(Spain) R Carballés Baena	6^{2}	3
(Chile) G Lama	4	3
(Argentina) F Argüello	6	6
3	(Argentina) D Schwartzman	7^{7}	6
Q	(Dominican Republic) J Hernández	6^{3}	3
(Argentina) G Pella	6	6
(Spain) D Muñoz de la Nava	2	4

Quarterfinals
1/WC	(Uruguay) P Cuevas	6	4	6
(Argentina) F Argüello	3	6	2
3	(Argentina) D Schwartzman	4	6	6^{5}
(Argentina) G Pella	6	1	7^{7}

Semifinals
1/WC	(Uruguay) P Cuevas	6	6
(Argentina) G Pella	4	4

=== Bottom half ===
First round
6	(Argentina) H Zeballos	6	6
LL	(Peru) D Beretta	4	3
Q	(Argentina) R Olivo	3	6	6
(Brazil) G Clezar	6	3	3
(Spain) J Samper Montaña	1	7^{7}	1
(Argentina) G Andreozzi	6	6^{4}	6
Q	(Argentina) P Cachin	6	2
4	(Colombia) A González	3	0^{r}
5	(Brazil) J Souza	7	3	2
(Spain) P Riba	5	6	6
WC	(Ecuador) Diego Quiróz	1	3
(Argentina) M Alund	6	6
WC	(Ecuador) G Lapentti	4	6	7
(Argentina) J Ignacio Londero	6	0	5
(United States) B Fratangelo	0	3
2	(Italy) P Lorenzi	6	6

Second round
6	(Argentina) H Zeballos	6^{3}	7^{7}	3
Q	(Argentina) R Olivo	7^{7}	6^{3}	6
(Argentina) G Andreozzi	6	6
Q	(Argentina) P Cachin	1	4
(Spain) P Riba	6	6
(Argentina) M Alund	2	3
WC	(Ecuador) G Lapentti	2	4
2	(Italy) P Lorenzi	6	6

Quarterfinals
Q	(Argentina) R Olivo	5	6	7^{7}
(Argentina) G Andreozzi	7	3	6^{3}
(Spain) P Riba	4	0
2	(Italy) P Lorenzi	6	6

Semifinals
Q	(Argentina) R Olivo	7^{7}	3	3
2	(Italy) P Lorenzi	6^{5}	6	6
