= 2023 Challenger Ciudad de Guayaquil – Doubles =

Doubles
- 2023 Challenger Ciudad de Guayaquil

Final
- Champions: (Peru) Arklon Huertas del Pino (Peru) Conner Huertas del Pino
- Runners-up: (Switzerland) Luca Margaroli (Argentina) Santiago Rodríguez Taverna
- Score: 6–3, 6–1

Events
Singles	Doubles
← 2022 ·	Challenger Ciudad de Guayaquil	· 2024 →

Guido Andreozzi and Guillermo Durán were the defending champions but chose not to defend their title.

Arklon and Conner Huertas del Pino won the title after defeating Luca Margaroli and Santiago Rodríguez Taverna 6–3, 6–1 in the final.

== Seeds ==
1. (Ecuador) Diego Hidalgo / (Colombia) Cristian Rodríguez (first round)
2. (Bolivia) Boris Arias / (Bolivia) Federico Zeballos (quarterfinals)
3. (Brazil) Fernando Romboli / (Brazil) Marcelo Zormann (first round)
4. (Switzerland) Luca Margaroli / (Argentina) Santiago Rodríguez Taverna (final)

== Draw ==
=== Key ===
- Q = Qualifier
- WC = Wild card
- LL = Lucky loser
- Alt = Alternate
- ITF = ITF entry
- PR = Protected ranking
- SR = Special ranking
- SE = Special exempt
- JE = Junior exempt
- JR = Junior Accelerator Programme entrant
- CO = College Accelerator Programme entrant
- NG = Next Gen Accelerator Program entrant
- w/o = Walkover
- r = Retired
- d = Defaulted

First round
1	(Ecuador) D Hidalgo (Colombia) C Rodríguez	7^{7}	1	[8]
(Italy) L Darderi (Argentina) JB Torres	6^{2}	6	[10]
(Brazil) M Pucinelli de Almeida (Brazil) JL Reis da Silva	4	2
WC	(Ecuador) Ángel Díaz Jalil (Ecuador) Á Guillén Meza	6	6
3	(Brazil) F Romboli (Brazil) M Zormann	6	4	[5]
(Peru) A Huertas del Pino (Peru) C Huertas del Pino	2	6	[10]
WC	(Ecuador) A Andrade (Peru) I Buse	6	6
Alt	(Brazil) Gilbert Klier Júnior (Brazil) P Sakamoto	4	0
Alt	(Colombia) N Mejía (Mexico) R Pacheco Méndez	3	6	[2]
PR	(Brazil) PA Saraiva dos Santos (Colombia) A Urrea	6	3	[10]
(Bolivia) H Dellien (Bolivia) M Dellien
4	(Switzerland) L Margaroli (Argentina) S Rodríguez Taverna	w/o
(Italy) F Agamenone (Argentina) RA Burruchaga	3	4
(Brazil) M Alves (Brazil) P Boscardin Dias	6	6
(Argentina) A Barrena (Argentina) JM Cerúndolo	1	3
2	(Bolivia) B Arias (Bolivia) F Zeballos	6	6

Quarterfinals
(Italy) L Darderi (Argentina) JB Torres
WC	(Ecuador) Á Díaz Jalil (Ecuador) Á Guillén Meza	w/o
(Peru) A Huertas del Pino (Peru) C Huertas del Pino	7^{8}	6
WC	(Ecuador) A Andrade (Peru) I Buse	6^{6}	4
PR	(Brazil) PA Saraiva dos Santos (Colombia) A Urrea	4	2
4	(Switzerland) L Margaroli (Argentina) S Rodríguez Taverna	6	6
(Brazil) M Alves (Brazil) P Boscardin Dias	7^{7}	6
2	(Bolivia) B Arias (Bolivia) F Zeballos	6^{5}	4

Semifinals
WC	(Ecuador) Á Díaz Jalil (Ecuador) Á Guillén Meza
(Peru) A Huertas del Pino (Peru) C Huertas del Pino	w/o
4	(Switzerland) L Margaroli (Argentina) S Rodríguez Taverna	7	6
(Brazil) M Alves (Brazil) P Boscardin Dias	5	4

Final
(Peru) A Huertas del Pino (Peru) C Huertas del Pino	6	6
4	(Switzerland) L Margaroli (Argentina) S Rodríguez Taverna	3	1
