= 2010 Challenger Ciudad de Guayaquil =

- Date: 8–14 November
- Edition: 6th
- Location: Guayaquil, Ecuador

Champions

Singles
- (Chile) Paul Capdeville

Doubles
- (Colombia) Juan Sebastián Cabal / (Colombia) Robert Farah
← 2009 ·	Challenger Ciudad de Guayaquil	· 2011 →

The 2010 Challenger Ciudad de Guayaquil was a professional tennis tournament played on outdoor red clay courts. It was the sixth edition of the tournament which is part of the 2010 ATP Challenger Tour. It took place in Guayaquil, Ecuador between 8 and 14 November 2010.

== Singles main draw entrants ==
=== Seeds ===
Country	Player	Rank^{1}	Seed
ARG	Carlos Berlocq	79	1
ARG	Brian Dabul	86	2
BRA	João Souza	101	3
ARG	Horacio Zeballos	113	4
SLO	Grega Žemlja	120	5
BRA	Marcos Daniel	123	6
ARG	Máximo González	154	7
FRA	Éric Prodon	163	8

- Rankings are as of November 1, 2010.

=== Other entrants ===
The following players received wildcards into the singles main draw:

- (Ecuador) Júlio César Campozano
- (Ecuador) Emilio Gómez
- (United States) Eric Nunez
- (Ecuador) Roberto Quiroz

The following players received entry from the qualifying draw:

- (Italy) Andrea Arnaboldi
- (Monaco) Benjamin Balleret
- (Italy) Gianluca Naso
- (Argentina) Martín Vassallo Argüello

== Champions ==
=== Singles ===
(Chile) Paul Capdeville def. (Argentina) Diego Junqueira, 6–3, 3–6, 6–3

=== Doubles ===
(Colombia) Juan Sebastián Cabal / (Colombia) Robert Farah def. (Brazil) Franco Ferreiro / (Brazil) André Sá, 7–5, 7–6(3)
