= 2026 Challenger Ciudad de Guayaquil – Singles =

Singles
- 2026 Challenger Ciudad de Guayaquil

Final
- Champion: (Bolivia) Hugo Dellien
- Runner-up: (Uruguay) Joaquín Aguilar Cardozo
- Score: 7–5, 1–0 ret.

Events
Singles	Doubles
- Challenger Ciudad de Guayaquil

Daniel Vallejo was the defending champion but chose not to defend his title.

Hugo Dellien won the title after Joaquín Aguilar Cardozo retired trailing 5–7, 0–1 in the final.

== Seeds ==
1. (Argentina) Camilo Ugo Carabelli (quarterfinals, defaulted)
2. (Bolivia) Hugo Dellien (champion)
3. (Chile) Tomás Barrios Vera (second round)
4. (Bolivia) Juan Carlos Prado Ángelo (second round)
5. (Brazil) João Lucas Reis da Silva (semifinals)
6. (Argentina) Lautaro Midón (quarterfinals)
7. (Germany) Diego Dedura (second round)
8. (Peru) Gonzalo Bueno (second round)

== Draw ==
Key

- Q = Qualifier
- WC = Wild card
- LL = Lucky loser
- Alt = Alternate
- ITF = ITF entry
- PR = Protected ranking
- SR = Special ranking
- SE = Special exempt
- JE = Junior exempt
- JR = Junior Accelerator Programme entrant
- CO = College Accelerator Programme entrant
- NG = Next Gen Accelerator Program entrant
- w/o = Walkover
- r = Retired
- d = Defaulted

=== Finals ===
Semifinals
5	(Brazil) João Lucas Reis da Silva	5	1
(Uruguay) Joaquín Aguilar Cardozo	7	6
SE	(Argentina) Valerio Aboian	6^{7}	2
2	(Bolivia) Hugo Dellien	7^{9}	6

Final
(Uruguay) Joaquín Aguilar Cardozo	5	0^{r}
2	(Bolivia) Hugo Dellien	7	1

=== Top half ===
First round
1	(Argentina) C Ugo Carabelli	7	6
PR	(Argentina) F Coria	5	2
(Ecuador) Á Guillén Meza	4	3
Q	(Mexico) A Hernández	6	6
WC	(Ecuador) Emilio Camacho	7^{8}	7^{7}
WC	(Ecuador) Ángel Véliz	6^{6}	6^{4}
Q	(Italy) Lorenzo Claverie	4	2
5	(Brazil) JL Reis da Silva	6	6
3	(Chile) T Barrios Vera	6	7^{14}
Alt	(Argentina) Juan Estévez	2	6^{12}
(Uruguay) J Aguilar Cardozo	6	6
Q	(Colombia) Miguel Tobón	3	3
Q	(Colombia) DE Galán	6	5	6
Q	(Argentina) Mateo del Pino	1	7	0
(Argentina) G Villanueva	3	3
6	(Argentina) L Midón	6	6

Second round
1	(Argentina) C Ugo Carabelli	2
Q	(Mexico) A Hernández	0^{r}
WC	(Ecuador) E Camacho	6	4	2
5	(Brazil) JL Reis da Silva	4	6	6
3	(Chile) T Barrios Vera	1	3
(Uruguay) J Aguilar Cardozo	6	6
Q	(Colombia) DE Galán	4	4
6	(Argentina) L Midón	6	6

Quarterfinals
1	(Argentina) C Ugo Carabelli	5^{d}
5	(Brazil) JL Reis da Silva	5
(Uruguay) J Aguilar Cardozo	7^{7}	6
6	(Argentina) L Midón	6^{3}	4

Semifinals
5	(Brazil) JL Reis da Silva	5	1
(Uruguay) J Aguilar Cardozo	7	6

=== Bottom half ===
First round
7	(Germany) D Dedura	7	7^{7}
(Argentina) GA Olivieri	5	6^{3}
(Uruguay) F Roncadelli	3	6	2
SE	(Argentina) V Aboian	6	2	6
(Dominican Republic) N Hardt	6	3	6
(Argentina) JM La Serna	3	6	1
(Brazil) P Boscardin Dias	3	2
4	(Bolivia) JC Prado Ángelo	6	6
8	(Peru) G Bueno	7^{7}	6
(Argentina) A Barrena	6^{1}	3
Alt	(Argentina) Carlos María Zárate	7	6
Q	(Mexico) A Magadán	5	1
(Peru) JP Varillas	2	3
(Mexico) R Pacheco Méndez	6	6
WC	(Chile) N Jarry	1	3
2	(Bolivia) H Dellien	6	6

Second round
7	(Germany) D Dedura	6^{4}	6^{3}
SE	(Argentina) V Aboian	7^{7}	7^{7}
(Dominican Republic) N Hardt	6	6
4	(Bolivia) JC Prado Ángelo	1	4
8	(Peru) G Bueno	6	5	5
Alt	(Argentina) CM Zárate	3	7	7
(Mexico) R Pacheco Méndez	5	2
2	(Bolivia) H Dellien	7	6

Quarterfinals
SE	(Argentina) V Aboian	6	1	7^{7}
(Dominican Republic) N Hardt	2	6	6^{5}
Alt	(Argentina) CM Zárate	0	2
2	(Bolivia) H Dellien	6	6

Semifinals
SE	(Argentina) V Aboian	6^{7}	2
2	(Bolivia) H Dellien	7^{9}	6
