= 2017 Challenger Ciudad de Guayaquil – Doubles =

Doubles
- 2017 Challenger Ciudad de Guayaquil

Final
- Champions: (El Salvador) Marcelo Arévalo; (Mexico) Miguel Ángel Reyes-Varela
- Runners-up: (Bolivia) Hugo Dellien; (Bolivia) Federico Zeballos
- Score: 6–1, 6–7^{(7–9)}, [10–6]

Events
Singles	Doubles
- Challenger Ciudad de Guayaquil

Ariel Behar and Fabiano de Paula were the defending champions but chose to defend their title with different partners. Behar partnered Attila Balázs but lost in the semifinals to Marcelo Arévalo and Miguel Ángel Reyes-Varela. De Paula partnered Sergio Galdós but lost in the first round to Hugo Dellien and Federico Zeballos.

Arévalo and Reyes-Varela won the title after defeating Dellien and Zeballos 6–1, 6–7^{(7–9)}, [10–6] in the final.

== Seeds ==
1. (Brazil) Fabiano de Paula / (Peru) Sergio Galdós (first round)
2. (El Salvador) Marcelo Arévalo / (Mexico) Miguel Ángel Reyes-Varela (champions)
3. (Argentina) Guido Andreozzi / (Argentina) Máximo González (quarterfinals)
4. (Hungary) Attila Balázs / (Uruguay) Ariel Behar (semifinals)

== Draw ==
Key

- Q = Qualifier
- WC = Wild card
- LL = Lucky loser
- Alt = Alternate
- ITF = ITF entry
- PR = Protected ranking
- SR = Special ranking
- SE = Special exempt
- JE = Junior exempt
- JR = Junior Accelerator Programme entrant
- CO = College Accelerator Programme entrant
- NG = Next Gen Accelerator Program entrant
- w/o = Walkover
- r = Retired
- d = Defaulted

First round

Quarterfinals

Semifinals

Final

1
- (Brazil) F de Paula
- (Peru) S Galdós
4
4

Alt
- (Bolivia) H Dellien
- (Bolivia) F Zeballos
6
6

Alt
- (Bolivia) H Dellien
- (Bolivia) F Zeballos
6^{5}
6
[10]

- (Uruguay) M Cuevas
- (Dominican Republic) V Estrella Burgos
6
6

- (Uruguay) M Cuevas
- (Dominican Republic) V Estrella Burgos
7^{7}
3
[8]

- (Argentina) F Agamenone
- (Argentina) T Lipovšek Puches
3
3

Alt
- (Bolivia) H Dellien
- (Bolivia) F Zeballos
6
6

3
- (Argentina) G Andreozzi
- (Argentina) M González
6
6

- (Slovenia) B Rola
- (Brazil) F Romboli
1
4

WC
(Ecuador) Á Guillén Meza
(Ecuador) Juán Sebastián Zabala Vargas
2
0

3
- (Argentina) G Andreozzi
- (Argentina) M González
6^{6}
3

- (Slovenia) B Rola
- (Brazil) F Romboli
6
6

- (Slovenia) B Rola
- (Brazil) F Romboli
7^{8}
6

WC
(Switzerland) Alexandre Abid
(Ecuador) Ricardo Albán
0
0

Alt
- (Bolivia) H Dellien
- (Bolivia) F Zeballos
1
7^{9}
[6]

- (Portugal) J Domingues
- (Brazil) J Souza
4
7^{7}
[10]

2
- (El Salvador) M Arévalo
- (Mexico) MÁ Reyes-Varela
6
6^{7}
[10]

PR
- (Colombia) A González
- (Ecuador) R Quiroz
6
6^{5}
[5]

- (Portugal) J Domingues
- (Brazil) J Souza
3
6^{7}

WC
(Argentina) C Berlocq
(Argentina) M Kestelboim
2
1

4
- (Hungary) A Balázs
- (Uruguay) A Behar
6
7^{9}

4
- (Hungary) A Balázs
- (Uruguay) A Behar
6
6

4
- (Hungary) A Balázs
- (Uruguay) A Behar
3
2

- (Monaco) R Arneodo
- (Italy) M Cecchinato
6
6

2
- (El Salvador) M Arévalo
- (Mexico) MÁ Reyes-Varela
6
6

- (Portugal) G Oliveira
- (Poland) G Panfil
1
0

- (Monaco) R Arneodo
- (Italy) M Cecchinato
2
6^{2}

- (Argentina) P Cachin
- (Spain) R Carballés Baena
2
6^{2}

2
- (El Salvador) M Arévalo
- (Mexico) MÁ Reyes-Varela
6
7^{7}

2
- (El Salvador) M Arévalo
- (Mexico) MÁ Reyes-Varela
6
7^{7}
