= 2013 Challenger Ciudad de Guayaquil – Doubles =

Doubles
- 2013 Challenger Ciudad de Guayaquil

Final
- Champions: (Netherlands) Stephan Fransen (Netherlands) Wesley Koolhof
- Runners-up: (Moldova) Roman Borvanov (Germany) Alexander Satschko
- Score: 1–6, 6–2, [10–5]

Events
Singles	Doubles
- Challenger Ciudad de Guayaquil

Martín Alund and Facundo Bagnis were the defending champions but decided not to participate.
Dutch team of Stephan Fransen and Wesley Koolhof won their first title as a team defeating Roman Borvanov and Alexander Satschko.

== Seeds ==
1. (United States) Vahid Mirzadeh / (Italy) Alessandro Motti (first round)
2. (Moldova) Roman Borvanov / (Germany) Alexander Satschko (final)
3. (Argentina) Guillermo Durán / (Argentina) Máximo González (quarterfinals)
4. (Netherlands) Stephan Fransen / (Netherlands) Wesley Koolhof (champions)

== Draw ==
Key

- Q = Qualifier
- WC = Wild card
- LL = Lucky loser
- Alt = Alternate
- ITF = ITF entry
- PR = Protected ranking
- SR = Special ranking
- SE = Special exempt
- JE = Junior exempt
- JR = Junior Accelerator Programme entrant
- CO = College Accelerator Programme entrant
- NG = Next Gen Accelerator Program entrant
- w/o = Walkover
- r = Retired
- d = Defaulted

=== Draw ===
First round
1	(United States) V Mirzadeh (Italy) A Motti	3	5
WC	(Venezuela) J de Armas (Ecuador) G Lapentti	6	7
WC	(Ecuador) G Escobar (Ecuador) R Quiroz	3	4
(Uruguay) M Cuevas (Brazil) F Neis	6	6
4	(Netherlands) S Fransen (Netherlands) W Koolhof	w/o
(Chile) P Capdeville (Ecuador) Sebastian Rivera
(Colombia) N Barrientos (United States) W Odesnik	3	6	[10]
WC	(Ecuador) I Endara (Austria) M Linzer	6	2	[7]
(Ecuador) JC Campozano (Dominican Republic) V Estrella Burgos	3	6	[3]
(Venezuela) R Maytín (Venezuela) D Souto	6	2	[10]
(Ecuador) E Gómez (Chile) G Lama	6	6^{6}	[6]
3	(Argentina) G Durán (Argentina) M González	4	7^{8}	[10]
(Argentina) Gabriel Alejandro Hidalgo (Venezuela) R Rodriguez	4	7^{7}	[4]
(Bolivia) H Dellien (Italy) G Quinzi	6	6^{2}	[10]
(Argentina) M Estévez (Argentina) JI Londero	1	7^{8}	3
2	(Moldova) R Borvanov (Germany) A Satschko	6	6^{6}	[10]

Quarterfinals
WC	(Venezuela) J de Armas (Ecuador) G Lapentti	6	7
(Uruguay) M Cuevas (Brazil) F Neis	4	5
4	(Netherlands) S Fransen (Netherlands) W Koolhof	6	6
(Colombia) N Barrientos (United States) W Odesnik	1	1
(Venezuela) R Maytín (Venezuela) D Souto	6	7^{8}
3	(Argentina) G Durán (Argentina) M González	3	6^{6}
(Bolivia) H Dellien (Italy) G Quinzi	6	3	[6]
2	(Moldova) R Borvanov (Germany) A Satschko	4	6	[10]

Semifinals
WC	(Venezuela) J de Armas (Ecuador) G Lapentti	6^{6}	1
4	(Netherlands) S Fransen (Netherlands) W Koolhof	7^{8}	6
(Venezuela) R Maytín (Venezuela) D Souto	6	1	[5]
2	(Moldova) R Borvanov (Germany) A Satschko	1	6	[10]

Final
4	(Netherlands) S Fransen (Netherlands) W Koolhof	1	6	[10]
2	(Moldova) R Borvanov (Germany) A Satschko	6	2	[5]
