= 2022 Challenger Ciudad de Guayaquil – Doubles =

Doubles
- 2022 Challenger Ciudad de Guayaquil

Final
- Champions: (Argentina) Guido Andreozzi (Argentina) Guillermo Durán
- Runners-up: (Argentina) Facundo Díaz Acosta (Venezuela) Luis David Martínez
- Score: 6–0, 6–4

Events
Singles	Doubles
← 2021 ·	Challenger Ciudad de Guayaquil	· 2023 →

Jesper de Jong and Bart Stevens were the defending champions but only de Jong chose to defend his title, partnering Max Houkes. De Jong and Houkes retired from their first round match against Boris Arias and Federico Zeballos.

Guido Andreozzi and Guillermo Durán won the title after defeating Facundo Díaz Acosta and Luis David Martínez 6–0, 6–4 in the final.

== Seeds ==
1. (India) Sriram Balaji / (India) Jeevan Nedunchezhiyan (semifinals)
2. (Argentina) Guido Andreozzi / (Argentina) Guillermo Durán (champions)
3. (Bolivia) Boris Arias / (Bolivia) Federico Zeballos (quarterfinals)
4. (Argentina) Facundo Díaz Acosta / (Venezuela) Luis David Martínez (final)

== Draw ==
=== Key ===
- Q = Qualifier
- WC = Wild card
- LL = Lucky loser
- Alt = Alternate
- SE = Special exempt
- PR = Protected ranking
- ITF = ITF entry
- JE = Junior exempt
- w/o = Walkover
- r = Retired
- d = Defaulted
- SR = Special ranking

First round
1	(India) S Balaji (India) J Nedunchezhiyan	2	7	[10]
(Argentina) F Comesaña (Spain) N Sánchez Izquierdo	6	5	[7]
(Argentina) Juan Ignacio Galarza (Argentina) T Lipovšek Puches	4	3
(Brazil) E Ribeiro (Brazil) T Seyboth Wild	6	6
4	(Argentina) F Díaz Acosta (Venezuela) LD Martínez	6	6
WC	(Ecuador) P Alvarado (Colombia) Juan Sebastián Osorio	3	3
(Argentina) TA Tirante (Argentina) JB Torres	6	0
(Brazil) D Dutra da Silva (Peru) A Merino	3	0^{r}
(Peru) S Galdós (Austria) G Melzer	3	6	[2]
(Poland) K Drzewiecki (Poland) P Matuszewski	6	4	[10]
(Netherlands) J de Jong (Netherlands) M Houkes	4	0^{r}
3	(Bolivia) B Arias (Bolivia) F Zeballos	6	0
WC	(Ecuador) A Guillén Meza (Ecuador) C March	6^{2}	3
(Ecuador) A Andrade (Ecuador) R Quiroz	7^{7}	6
(Argentina) H Casanova (Argentina) S Rodríguez Taverna	2	3
2	(Argentina) G Andreozzi (Argentina) G Durán	6	6

Quarterfinals
1	(India) S Balaji (India) J Nedunchezhiyan	6	6
(Brazil) E Ribeiro (Brazil) T Seyboth Wild	2	4
4	(Argentina) F Díaz Acosta (Venezuela) LD Martínez	w/o
(Argentina) TA Tirante (Argentina) JB Torres
(Poland) K Drzewiecki (Poland) P Matuszewski	6	6
3	(Bolivia) B Arias (Bolivia) F Zeballos	4	2
(Ecuador) A Andrade (Ecuador) R Quiroz	6^{5}	1
2	(Argentina) G Andreozzi (Argentina) G Durán	7^{7}	6

Semifinals
1	(India) S Balaji (India) J Nedunchezhiyan	4	5
4	(Argentina) F Díaz Acosta (Venezuela) LD Martínez	6	7
(Poland) K Drzewiecki (Poland) P Matuszewski	5	3
2	(Argentina) G Andreozzi (Argentina) G Durán	7	6

Final
4	(Argentina) F Díaz Acosta (Venezuela) LD Martínez	0	4
2	(Argentina) G Andreozzi (Argentina) G Durán	6	6
