= 2026 Challenger Ciudad de Guayaquil – Doubles =

Doubles
- 2026 Challenger Ciudad de Guayaquil

Final
- Champions: (Ecuador) Diego Hidalgo (Argentina) Mariano Kestelboim
- Runners-up: (Poland) Karol Drzewiecki (Poland) Piotr Matuszewski
- Score: 7–5, 6–7^{(4–7)}, [10–7]

Events
Singles	Doubles
- Challenger Ciudad de Guayaquil

Alex Hernández and Rodrigo Pacheco Méndez were the defending champions but chose not to defend their title.

Diego Hidalgo and Mariano Kestelboim won the title after defeating Karol Drzewiecki and Piotr Matuszewski 7–5, 6–7^{(4–7)}, [10–7] in the final.

== Seeds ==
1. (Ecuador) Diego Hidalgo / (Argentina) Mariano Kestelboim (champions)
2. (Poland) Karol Drzewiecki / (Poland) Piotr Matuszewski (final)
3. (Bolivia) Boris Arias / (Uruguay) Ignacio Carou (semifinals)
4. (Mexico) Alan Magadán / (Bolivia) Federico Zeballos (quarterfinals)

== Draw ==
Key

- Q = Qualifier
- WC = Wild card
- LL = Lucky loser
- Alt = Alternate
- ITF = ITF entry
- PR = Protected ranking
- SR = Special ranking
- SE = Special exempt
- JE = Junior exempt
- JR = Junior Accelerator Programme entrant
- CO = College Accelerator Programme entrant
- NG = Next Gen Accelerator Program entrant
- w/o = Walkover
- r = Retired
- d = Defaulted

First round
1	(Ecuador) D Hidalgo (Argentina) M Kestelboim	6	6
(Peru) A Huertas del Pino (Peru) A Merino	2	0
(Brazil) L Britto (Brazil) M Zormann	6	7
(Bulgaria) A Genov (Morocco) Y Lalami	3	5
3	(Bolivia) B Arias (Uruguay) I Carou	6	6
WC	(Ecuador) Emilio Camacho (Ecuador) Ángel Véliz	2	0
(Brazil) Bruno Oliveira (Brazil) Natan Rodrigues	6	6
(Argentina) G Villanueva (Argentina) Carlos María Zárate	4	2
(Argentina) Mateo del Pino (Argentina) JM La Serna
WC	(Argentina) F Bagnis (Ecuador) E Gómez	w/o
(United States) Zachary Fuchs (Venezuela) B Pérez	4	4
4	(Mexico) A Magadán (Bolivia) F Zeballos	6	6
Alt	(Argentina) Juan Estévez (Argentina) Lucio Ratti	5	2
Alt	(Argentina) Nicolás Hollender (Argentina) GA Olivieri	7	6
(Uruguay) J Aguilar Cardozo (Uruguay) F Roncadelli
2	(Poland) K Drzewiecki (Poland) P Matuszewski	w/o

Quarterfinals
1	(Ecuador) D Hidalgo (Argentina) M Kestelboim	6	6
(Brazil) L Britto (Brazil) M Zormann	4	2
3	(Bolivia) B Arias (Uruguay) I Carou	6	7
(Brazil) B Oliveira (Brazil) N Rodrigues	1	5
WC	(Argentina) F Bagnis (Ecuador) E Gómez	6	6
4	(Mexico) A Magadán (Bolivia) F Zeballos	3	4
Alt	(Argentina) N Hollender (Argentina) GA Olivieri	6	2	[9]
2	(Poland) K Drzewiecki (Poland) P Matuszewski	2	6	[11]

Semifinals
1	(Ecuador) D Hidalgo (Argentina) M Kestelboim	6	4	[10]
3	(Bolivia) B Arias (Uruguay) I Carou	1	6	[5]
WC	(Argentina) F Bagnis (Ecuador) E Gómez	6	4	[7]
2	(Poland) K Drzewiecki (Poland) P Matuszewski	1	6	[10]

Final
1	(Ecuador) D Hidalgo (Argentina) M Kestelboim	7	6^{4}	[10]
2	(Poland) K Drzewiecki (Poland) P Matuszewski	5	7^{7}	[7]
