= 2018 Challenger Ciudad de Guayaquil =

- Date: 29 October – 3 November
- Edition: 14th
- Surface: Clay
- Location: Guayaquil, Ecuador

Champions

Singles
- (Argentina) Guido Andreozzi

Doubles
- (Argentina) Guillermo Durán / (Ecuador) Roberto Quiroz
← 2017 ·	Challenger Ciudad de Guayaquil	· 2019 →

The 2018 Challenger Ciudad de Guayaquil was a professional tennis tournament played on clay courts. It was the fourteenth edition of the tournament which was part of the 2018 ATP Challenger Tour. It took place in Guayaquil, Ecuador between October 29 and November 3, 2018.

== Singles main-draw entrants ==
=== Seeds ===
Country	Player	Rank^{1}	Seed
URU	Pablo Cuevas	66	1
~~ARG~~	~~Federico Delbonis~~	~~84~~	~~2~~
ARG	Guido Andreozzi	94	3
~~CHI~~	~~Christian Garín~~	~~102~~	~~4~~
ITA	Paolo Lorenzi	114	5
BRA	Thiago Monteiro	115	6
BOL	Hugo Dellien	116	7
ARG	Juan Ignacio Londero	122	8

- ^{1} Rankings are as of 22 October 2018.

=== Other entrants ===
The following players received wildcards into the singles main draw:

- (Peru) Nicolás Álvarez
- (Ecuador) Emilio Gómez
- (Dominican Republic) José Hernández-Fernández
- (Ecuador) Diego Hidalgo

The following player received entry into the singles main draw using a protected ranking:

- (Colombia) Santiago Giraldo

The following players received entry from the qualifying draw:

- (Argentina) Federico Coria
- (Uruguay) Martín Cuevas
- (Brazil) Thiago Seyboth Wild
- (Peru) Juan Pablo Varillas

The following players received entry as lucky losers:

- (United States) Ulises Blanch
- (Serbia) Miljan Zekić

== Champions ==
=== Singles ===
- (Argentina) Guido Andreozzi def. (Portugal) Pedro Sousa 7–5, 1–6, 6–4.

=== Doubles ===
- (Argentina) Guillermo Durán / (Ecuador) Roberto Quiroz def. (Brazil) Thiago Monteiro / (Brazil) Fabrício Neis 6–3, 6–2.
