= 2023 Challenger Ciudad de Guayaquil – Singles =

Singles
- 2023 Challenger Ciudad de Guayaquil

Final
- Champion: (Chile) Alejandro Tabilo
- Runner-up: (Colombia) Daniel Elahi Galán
- Score: 6–2, 6–2

Events
Singles	Doubles
- Challenger Ciudad de Guayaquil

Daniel Altmaier was the defending champion but chose not to defend his title.

Alejandro Tabilo won the title after defeating Daniel Elahi Galán 6–2, 6–2 in the final.

== Seeds ==
1. (Argentina) Federico Coria (quarterfinals)
2. (Colombia) Daniel Elahi Galán (final)
3. (Argentina) Facundo Díaz Acosta (quarterfinals, retired)
4. (Argentina) Juan Manuel Cerúndolo (first round)
5. (Chile) Alejandro Tabilo (champion)
6. (Bolivia) Hugo Dellien (quarterfinals)
7. (Brazil) Felipe Meligeni Alves (semifinals)
8. (Argentina) Camilo Ugo Carabelli (quarterfinals)

== Draw ==
Key

- Q = Qualifier
- WC = Wild card
- LL = Lucky loser
- Alt = Alternate
- ITF = ITF entry
- PR = Protected ranking
- SR = Special ranking
- SE = Special exempt
- JE = Junior exempt
- JR = Junior Accelerator Programme entrant
- CO = College Accelerator Programme entrant
- NG = Next Gen Accelerator Program entrant
- w/o = Walkover
- r = Retired
- d = Defaulted

=== Finals ===
Semifinals
5	(Chile) Alejandro Tabilo	6	6
(Argentina) Román Andrés Burruchaga	3	4
7	(Brazil) Felipe Meligeni Alves	4	6^{5}
2/WC	(Colombia) Daniel Elahi Galán	6	7^{7}

Final
5	(Chile) Alejandro Tabilo	6	6
2/WC	(Colombia) Daniel Elahi Galán	2	2

=== Top half ===
First round
1	(Argentina) F Coria	6	5	6
Q	(South Korea) G Campaña Lee	0	7	1
(Italy) F Agamenone	6	4	6
(United States) O Crawford	3	6	1
WC	(Ecuador) A Andrade	3	4
(Brazil) M Pucinelli de Almeida	6	6
Q	(Argentina) JB Torres	4	1
5	(Chile) A Tabilo	6	6
4	(Argentina) JM Cerúndolo	4	2
(Argentina) RA Burruchaga	6	6
WC	(Ecuador) Á Guillén Meza	4	6	4
(Austria) L Neumayer	6	2	6
(Italy) L Darderi	6	6
(Czech Republic) D Svrčina	2	3
(Brazil) JL Reis da Silva	4	0
8	(Argentina) C Ugo Carabelli	6	6

Second round
1	(Argentina) F Coria	4	6	6
(Italy) F Agamenone	6	4	3
(Brazil) M Pucinelli de Almeida	6	1	2
5	(Chile) A Tabilo	4	6	6
(Argentina) RA Burruchaga	5	6	6
(Austria) L Neumayer	7	0	4
(Italy) L Darderi	6	6^{5}	2
8	(Argentina) C Ugo Carabelli	4	7^{7}	6

Quarterfinals
1	(Argentina) F Coria	7^{7}	4	4
5	(Chile) A Tabilo	6^{4}	6	6
(Argentina) RA Burruchaga	6	5	6
8	(Argentina) C Ugo Carabelli	4	7	1

Semifinals
5	(Chile) A Tabilo	6	6
(Argentina) RA Burruchaga	3	4

=== Bottom half ===
First round
7	(Brazil) F Meligeni Alves	4	6	6
Q	(Colombia) N Mejía	6	2	4
Q	(Netherlands) M Houkes	6	6
Q	(Spain) C Taberner	3	1
Q	(Peru) G Bueno	0	4
(Argentina) M Trungelliti	6	6
(Bolivia) M Dellien	3	2
3	(Argentina) F Díaz Acosta	6	6
6	(Bolivia) H Dellien	6	7
LL	(Argentina) A Barrena	2	5
(Argentina) S Rodríguez Taverna	6	6
(United States) T Boyer	1	4
(Mexico) R Pacheco Méndez	1	6	6^{5}
(Sweden) E Ymer	6	2	7^{7}
(Switzerland) K Feldbausch	3	7^{7}	0^{r}
2/WC	(Colombia) DE Galán	6	6^{4}	5

Second round
7	(Brazil) F Meligeni Alves	5	6	6
Q	(Netherlands) M Houkes	7	3	4
(Argentina) M Trungelliti	1	6	6^{5}
3	(Argentina) F Díaz Acosta	6	1	7^{7}
6	(Bolivia) H Dellien	6	4	6
(Argentina) S Rodríguez Taverna	2	6	3
(Sweden) E Ymer	3	2
2/WC	(Colombia) DE Galán	6	6

Quarterfinals
7	(Brazil) F Meligeni Alves	6	3
3	(Argentina) F Díaz Acosta	1	1^{r}
6	(Bolivia) H Dellien	1	2
2/WC	(Colombia) DE Galán	6	6

Semifinals
7	(Brazil) F Meligeni Alves	4	6^{5}
2/WC	(Colombia) DE Galán	6	7^{7}
