= 2011 Challenger Ciudad de Guayaquil =

- Date: 21–27 November
- Edition: 7th
- Location: Guayaquil, Ecuador

Champions

Singles
- (Italy) Matteo Viola

Doubles
- (Ecuador) Júlio César Campozano / (Ecuador) Roberto Quiroz
| ← 2010 · | Challenger Ciudad de Guayaquil | · 2012 → |

The 2011 Challenger Ciudad de Guayaquil was a professional tennis tournament played on clay courts. It was the seventh edition of the tournament which is part of the 2011 ATP Challenger Tour. It took place in Guayaquil, Ecuador between 21 and 27 November 2011.

== Singles main draw entrants ==
=== Seeds ===
| Country | Player | Rank^{1} | Seed |
|---|---|---|---|
| ARG | Diego Junqueira | 100 | 1 |
| BRA | João Souza | 101 | 2 |
| BRA | Rogério Dutra da Silva | 122 | 3 |
| ESP | Rubén Ramírez Hidalgo | 124 | 4 |
| USA | Wayne Odesnik | 127 | 5 |
| ARG | Máximo González | 130 | 6 |
| ITA | Alessandro Giannessi | 136 | 7 |
| ESP | Daniel Muñoz de la Nava | 140 | 8 |

- ^{1} Rankings are as of November 14, 2011.

=== Other entrants ===
The following players received wildcards into the singles main draw:

- (Ecuador) Júlio César Campozano
- (Ecuador) Diego Hidalgo
- (Chile) Nicolás Massú
- (Ecuador) Roberto Quiroz

The following players received entry from the qualifying draw:

- (Argentina) Guillermo Duran
- (Argentina) Guido Pella
- (Portugal) Pedro Sousa
- (Portugal) Leonardo Tavares

The following players received entry as a lucky loser into the singles main draw:

- (Argentina) Guido Andreozzi
- (Ecuador) Iván Endara
- (Colombia) Juan Sebastián Gómez

== Champions ==
=== Singles ===
(Italy) Matteo Viola def. (Argentina) Guido Pella, 6–4, 6–1

=== Doubles ===
(Ecuador) Júlio César Campozano / (Ecuador) Roberto Quiroz def. (Uruguay) Marcel Felder / (Brazil) Rodrigo Grilli, 6–4, 6–1
