= 2014 Challenger Ciudad de Guayaquil =

- Date: 10 November – 16 November
- Edition: 10th
- Surface: Clay
- Location: Guayaquil, Ecuador

Champions

Singles
- (Uruguay) Pablo Cuevas

Doubles
- (Argentina) Máximo González / (Argentina) Guido Pella
- Challenger Ciudad de Guayaquil

The 2014 Challenger Ciudad de Guayaquil was a professional tennis tournament played on clay courts. It was the tenth edition of the tournament and was part of the 2014 ATP Challenger Tour. It took place in Guayaquil, Ecuador between November 10 and November 16, 2014.

== Singles main-draw entrants ==
=== Seeds ===
Country	Player	Rank^{1}	Seed
URU	Pablo Cuevas	35	1
ITA	Paolo Lorenzi	70	2
ARG	Diego Schwartzman	78	3
COL	Alejandro González	79	4
BRA	João Souza	91	5
ARG	Horacio Zeballos	100	6
ARG	Máximo González	101	7
ARG	Facundo Bagnis	113	8

- ^{1} Rankings are as of November 3, 2014.

=== Other entrants ===
The following players received wildcards into the singles main draw:

- (Uruguay) Pablo Cuevas
- (Ecuador) Gonzalo Escobar
- (Ecuador) Diego Quiróz
- (Ecuador) Giovanni Lapentti

The following players received entry from the qualifying draw:

- (Argentina) Pedro Cachin
- (Dominican Republic) José Hernández
- (Argentina) Renzo Olivo
- (Poland) Grzegorz Panfil

The following player received entry by a lucky loser spot:

- (Peru) Duilio Beretta

== Champions ==
=== Singles ===
- (Uruguay) Pablo Cuevas def. (Italy) Paolo Lorenzi by walkover

=== Doubles ===
- (Argentina) Máximo González / (Argentina) Guido Pella def. (Spain) Pere Riba / (Spain) Jordi Samper-Montaña, 2–6, 7–6^{(7–3)}, [10–5]
