= 2026 Challenger Ciudad de Guayaquil =

- Date: 26 October – 1 November
- Edition: 22nd
- Surface: Clay
- Location: Guayaquil, Ecuador

Champions

Singles
- (Bolivia) Hugo Dellien

Doubles
- (Ecuador) Diego Hidalgo / (Argentina) Mariano Kestelboim
- Challenger Ciudad de Guayaquil

The 2026 Challenger de Guayaquil Copa Banco Guayaquil was a professional tennis tournament played on clay courts. It was the 22nd edition of the tournament which was part of the 2026 ATP Challenger Tour. It took place in Guayaquil, Ecuador between 26 October and 1 November 2026.

== Singles main-draw entrants ==
=== Seeds ===
Country	Player	Rank^{1}	Seed
ARG	Camilo Ugo Carabelli	75	1
BOL	Hugo Dellien	118	2
CHI	Tomás Barrios Vera	155	3
BOL	Juan Carlos Prado Ángelo	177	4
BRA	João Lucas Reis da Silva	188	5
ARG	Lautaro Midón	189	6
GER	Diego Dedura	190	7
PER	Gonzalo Bueno	199	8

- ^{1} Rankings are as of 19 October 2026.

=== Other entrants ===
The following players received wildcards into the singles main draw:

- (Ecuador) Emilio Camacho
- (Chile) Nicolas Jarry
- (Ecuador) Ángel Véliz

The following player received entry into the singles main draw using a protected ranking:

- (Argentina) Federico Coria

The following player received entry into the singles main draw as a special exempt:

- (Argentina) Valerio Aboian

The following players received entry into the singles main draw as alternates:

- (Argentina) Juan Estévez
- (Argentina) Carlos María Zárate

The following players received entry from the qualifying draw:

- (Italy) Lorenzo Claverie
- (Argentina) Mateo del Pino
- (Colombia) Daniel Elahi Galán
- (Mexico) Alex Hernández
- (Mexico) Alan Magadán
- (Colombia) Miguel Tobón

== Champions ==
=== Singles ===
- (Bolivia) Hugo Dellien def. (Uruguay) Joaquín Aguilar Cardozo 7–5, 1–0 retired.

=== Doubles ===
- (Ecuador) Diego Hidalgo / (Argentina) Mariano Kestelboim def. (Poland) Karol Drzewiecki / (Poland) Piotr Matuszewski 7–5, 6–7^{(4–7)}, [10–7].
