= 2023 Challenger Ciudad de Guayaquil =

- Date: 30 October – 5 November
- Edition: 19th
- Surface: Clay
- Location: Guayaquil, Ecuador

Champions

Singles
- (Chile) Alejandro Tabilo

Doubles
- (Peru) Arklon Huertas del Pino / (Peru) Conner Huertas del Pino
- Challenger Ciudad de Guayaquil

The 2023 Challenger Ciudad de Guayaquil was a professional tennis tournament played on clay courts. It was the 19th edition of the tournament which was part of the 2023 ATP Challenger Tour. It took place in Guayaquil, Ecuador between 30 October and 5 November 2023.

== Singles main-draw entrants ==
=== Seeds ===
Country	Player	Rank^{1}	Seed
ARG	Federico Coria	76	1
COL	Daniel Elahi Galán	98	2
ARG	Facundo Díaz Acosta	109	3
ARG	Juan Manuel Cerúndolo	114	4
CHI	Alejandro Tabilo	122	5
BOL	Hugo Dellien	129	6
BRA	Felipe Meligeni Alves	144	7
ARG	Camilo Ugo Carabelli	153	8

- ^{1} Rankings are as of 23 October 2023.

=== Other entrants ===
The following players received wildcards into the singles main draw:

- (Ecuador) Andrés Andrade
- (Colombia) Daniel Elahi Galán
- (Ecuador) Álvaro Guillén Meza

The following players received entry from the qualifying draw:

- (Peru) Gonzalo Bueno
- (South Korea) Gerard Campaña Lee
- (Netherlands) Max Houkes
- (Colombia) Nicolás Mejía
- (Spain) Carlos Taberner
- (Argentina) Juan Bautista Torres

The following player received entry as a lucky loser:

- (Argentina) Alex Barrena

== Champions ==
=== Singles ===
- (Chile) Alejandro Tabilo def. (Colombia) Daniel Elahi Galán 6–2, 6–2.

=== Doubles ===
- (Peru) Arklon Huertas del Pino / (Peru) Conner Huertas del Pino def. (Switzerland) Luca Margaroli / (Argentina) Santiago Rodríguez Taverna 6–3, 6–1.
