= 2016 Challenger Ciudad de Guayaquil =

- Date: 31 October – 6 November
- Edition: 12th
- Surface: Clay
- Location: Guayaquil, Ecuador

Champions

Singles
- (Argentina) Nicolás Kicker

Doubles
- (Uruguay) Ariel Behar / (Brazil) Fabiano de Paula
- Challenger Ciudad de Guayaquil

The 2016 Challenger Ciudad de Guayaquil was a professional tennis tournament played on clay courts. It was the twelfth edition of the tournament which was part of the 2016 ATP Challenger Tour. It took place in Guayaquil, Ecuador, between October 31 and November 6, 2016.

== Singles main-draw entrants ==
=== Seeds ===
Country	Player	Rank^{1}	Seed
POR	Gastão Elias	57	1
ARG	Facundo Bagnis	67	2
ARG	~~Renzo Olivo~~	~~86~~	~~3~~
ARG	Carlos Berlocq	89	4
DOM	Víctor Estrella Burgos	94	5
COL	Santiago Giraldo	100	6
BRA	Rogério Dutra Silva	105	7
BRA	João Souza	125	8
USA	Ernesto Escobedo	126	9

- ^{1} Rankings are as of October 24, 2016.

=== Other entrants ===
The following players received wildcards into the singles main draw:

- (Ecuador) Iván Endara
- (Ecuador) Gonzalo Escobar
- (Ecuador) Emilio Gómez
- (Ecuador) Roberto Quiroz

The following players received entry from the qualifying draw:

- (Colombia) Daniel Elahi Galán
- (Chile) Bastián Malla
- (Argentina) Andrés Molteni
- (Brazil) João Pedro Sorgi

The following player entered as a lucky loser:

- (Austria) Michael Linzer

== Champions ==
=== Singles ===
- (Argentina) Nicolás Kicker def. (Belgium) Arthur De Greef 6–3, 6–2

=== Doubles ===
- (Uruguay) Ariel Behar / (Brazil) Fabiano de Paula def. (El Salvador) Marcelo Arévalo / (Peru) Sergio Galdós 6–2, 6–4
