= 2013 Challenger Ciudad de Guayaquil =

- Date: 11 – 17 November
- Edition: 9th
- Surface: Clay
- Location: Guayaquil, Ecuador

Champions

Singles
- (Argentina) Leonardo Mayer

Doubles
- (Netherlands) Stephan Fransen / (Netherlands) Wesley Koolhof
- Challenger Ciudad de Guayaquil

The 2013 Challenger Ciudad de Guayaquil was a professional clay-court tennis tournament. It was the ninth edition of the tournament, which was part of the 2013 ATP Challenger Tour. It took place in Guayaquil, Ecuador between 11 and 17 November 2013.

== Singles main-draw entrants ==
=== Seeds ===
Country	Player	Rank^{1}	Seed
ARG	Leonardo Mayer	93	1
ITA	Paolo Lorenzi	102	2
ARG	Diego Sebastián Schwartzman	115	3
USA	Wayne Odesnik	136	4
CHI	Paul Capdeville	148	5
POR	Gastão Elias	155	6
ARG	Máximo González	161	7
DOM	Víctor Estrella Burgos	199	8

- ^{1} Rankings are as of November 4, 2013.

=== Other entrants ===
The following players received wildcards into the singles main draw:

- (Ecuador) Gonzalo Escobar
- (Ecuador) Giovanni Lapentti
- (Ecuador) Roberto Quiroz
- (Ecuador) Jorman Reyes

The following players received entry from the qualifying draw:

- (Uruguay) Martín Cuevas
- (Argentina) Guillermo Durán
- (Argentina) Nicolás Kicker
- (Netherlands) Wesley Koolhof

== Champions ==
=== Singles ===
- (Argentina) Leonardo Mayer def. (Portugal) Pedro Sousa 6–4, 7–5

=== Doubles ===
- (Netherlands) Stephan Fransen / (Netherlands) Wesley Koolhof def. (Moldova) Roman Borvanov / (Germany) Alexander Satschko 1–6, 6–2, [10–5]
