= Lars Pörschke =

German tennis player

- ITF name: Lars Poerschke
- Country (sports): Germany
- Residence: Giessen, Germany
- Born: 17 June 1984 (age 40); Giessen, Germany
- Plays: Right-handed (two-handed backhand)
- Prize money: $42,291

Singles
- Career record: 0–2 (at ATP Tour level, Grand Slam level, and in Davis Cup)
- Career titles: 4 ITF
- Highest ranking: No. 277 (30 November 2009)

Doubles
- Career record: 0–0 (at ATP Tour level, Grand Slam level, and in Davis Cup)
- Career titles: 6 ITF
- Highest ranking: No. 315 (28 December 2009)
- Last updated on: 25 June 2018.

Lars Pörschke (born 17 June 1984) is a former German tennis player.

Pörschke has a career high ATP singles ranking of 277 achieved on 30 November 2009. He also has a career high ATP doubles ranking of 315 achieved on 28 December 2009.

Pörschke made his ATP main draw debut at the 2009 SAP Open after receiving a wildcard into the singles main draw.
