= Julio César Campozano =

Ecuadorian tennis player

Julio Campozano
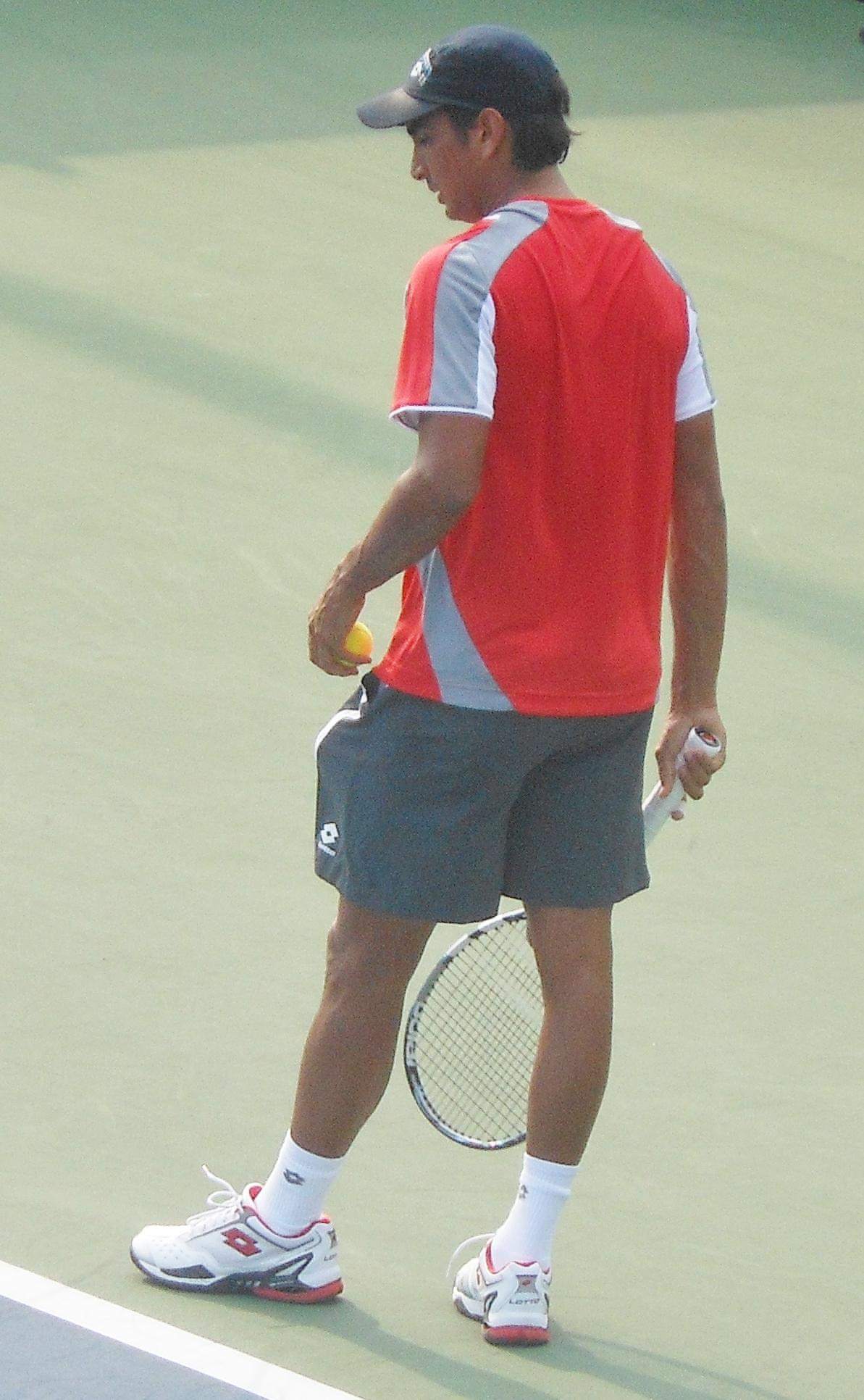
- Campozano at the 2012 US Open
- Full name: Julio César Campozano
- Country (sports): Ecuador
- Born: 31 January 1986 (age 40) Ecuador
- Turned pro: 2003
- Retired: 2014
- Plays: Right-handed (double-handed backhand)
- Prize money: $145,730

Singles
- Career record: 13–12
- Career titles: 0
- Highest ranking: No. 197 (1 April 2013)

Doubles
- Career record: 1–5
- Career titles: 0
- Highest ranking: No. 192 (9 July 2012)
Medal record
Men's tennis
Representing Ecuador
Pan American Games
Silver medal – second place	2011 Guadalajara	Doubles

Julio César Campozano (Latin American Spanish: [ˈxuljo ˈsesaɾ kampoˈsano]; born 31 January 1986) is a retired Ecuadorian tennis player.

He won seven singles and five doubles Futures titles, and he won doubles title in 2009 Guayaquil Challenger, competing with his compatriot Emilio Gómez. They defeated Andreas Haider-Maurer and Lars Pörschke 6–7^{(2–7)}, 6–3, [10–8] in the final.

He is a member of the Ecuador Davis Cup team. His coaches are Alejandro Fabri and Matias Rizzo.

== Career titles ==
=== Singles (9) ===
Legend (singles)
Challengers (0)
Futures (9)

No.	Date	Tournament	Surface	Opponent	Score
1.	31 July 2006	Venezuela F1	Clay	(Colombia) Michael Quintero	6–1, 6–7^{(5–7)}, 7–6^{(8–6)}
2.	1 October 2007	Venezuela F5	Hard	(Dominican Republic) Víctor Estrella	6–3, 6–3
3.	8 October 2007	Venezuela F6	Hard	(Venezuela) Piero Luisi	7–5, 1–0, ret.
4.	16 June 2008	Venezuela F2	Clay	(Venezuela) Román Recarte	6–4, 6–2
5.	10 August 2009	Ecuador F2	Clay	(Ecuador) Iván Endara	6–1, 4–6, 6–2
6.	6 September 2010	Ecuador F1	Hard	(Argentina) Nicolás Pastor	5–7, 6–3, 6–3
7.	13 September 2010	Ecuador F2	Hard	(United States) Maciek Sykut	6–2, 6–0
8.	6 May 2012	Venezuela F1	Clay	(Peru) Mauricio Echazú	6–4, 6–3
9.	13 May 2012	Venezuela F2	Clay	(Venezuela) David Souto	6–4, 6–3
10.	20 May 2012	Venezuela F3	Hard	(Argentina) Maximiliano Estévez	6–3, 6–1

=== Doubles (8) ===
Legend (singles)
Challengers (3)
Futures (5)

No.	Date	Tournament	Surface	Partner	Opponents	Score
1.	25 September 2006	Venezuela F4	Clay	(Ecuador) Carlos Avellán	(Peru) Iván Miranda (Colombia) Sergio Ramírez	7–6^{(7–0)}, 6–4
2.	5 May 2008	Colombia F4	Clay	(Argentina) Alejandro Kon	(Colombia) Alejandro González (Colombia) Eduardo Struvay	2–6, 7–6^{(7–1)}, [11–9]
3.	5 May 2008	Ecuador F1	Clay	(Ecuador) Walter Valarezo	(Argentina) Federico Cavallero (Chile) Borja Malo	6–7^{(6–8)}, 6–4, [10–5]
4.	17 August 2009	Ecuador F1	Clay	(Colombia) Juan Sebastián Cabal	(Colombia) Alejandro González (Colombia) Felipe Mantilla	6–2, 6–0
5.	9 November 2009	Guayaquil Chall.	Clay	(Ecuador) Emilio Gómez	(Austria) Andreas Haider-Maurer (Germany) Lars Pörschke	6–7^{(2–7)}, 6–3, [10–8]
6.	18 January 2010	El Salvador F1	Clay	(Ecuador) Emilio Gómez	(United States) Conor Pollock (United States) Maciek Sykut	6–4, 7–6^{(7–4)}
7.	26 November 2011	Guayaquil Chall.	Clay	(Ecuador) Roberto Quiroz	(Uruguay) Marcel Felder (Brazil) Rodrigo Grilli	6–4, 6–1
8.	7 July 2012	Panama City	Clay	(Colombia) Alejandro González	(United States) Daniel Kosakowski (Canada) Peter Polansky	6–4, 7–5
