= Challenger Ciudad de Guayaquil =

Tennis tournament in Ecuador

Challenger de Guayaquil
- 2025 Challenger Ciudad de Guayaquil

ATP Challenger Tour
- Event name: Challenger de Guayaquil - Copa Banco Guayaquil
- Location: Guayaquil, Ecuador
- Venue: Guayaquil Tennis Club
- Category: ATP Challenger Tour
- Surface: Clay / Outdoors
- Draw: 32S/32Q/16D
- Prize money: $100,000 (2025), $82,000 (2024)
- Website: Website

The Challenger de Guayaquil - Copa Banco Guayaquil, is a tennis tournament held in Guayaquil, Ecuador, since 2005. The event is part of the ATP Challenger Tour and is played on outdoor clay courts.

== Past finals ==
=== Singles ===
Year	Champion	Runner-up	Score
2026	(Bolivia) Hugo Dellien	(Uruguay) Joaquín Aguilar Cardozo	7–5, 1–0 ret.
2025	(Paraguay) Daniel Vallejo	(Peru) Juan Pablo Varillas	7–5, 6–7^{(7–9)}, 6–3
2024	(Argentina) Federico Agustín Gómez	(Chile) Tomás Barrios Vera	6–1, 6–4
2023	(Chile) Alejandro Tabilo	(Colombia) Daniel Elahi Galán	6–2, 6–2
2022	(Germany) Daniel Altmaier	(Argentina) Federico Coria	6–2, 6–4
2021	(Chile) Alejandro Tabilo	(Netherlands) Jesper de Jong	6–1, 7–5
2020	(Argentina) Francisco Cerúndolo	(Slovakia) Andrej Martin	6–4, 3–6, 6–2
2019	(Brazil) Thiago Seyboth Wild	(Bolivia) Hugo Dellien	6–4, 6–0
2018	(Argentina) Guido Andreozzi	(Portugal) Pedro Sousa	7–5, 1–6, 6–4
2017	(Austria) Gerald Melzer	(Argentina) Facundo Bagnis	6–3, 6–1
2016	(Argentina) Nicolás Kicker	(Belgium) Arthur De Greef	6–3, 6–2
2015	(Portugal) Gastão Elias	(Argentina) Diego Schwartzman	6–0, 6–4
2014	(Uruguay) Pablo Cuevas	(Italy) Paolo Lorenzi	Walkover
2013	(Argentina) Leonardo Mayer	(Portugal) Pedro Sousa	6–4, 7–5
2012	(Argentina) Leonardo Mayer	(Italy) Paolo Lorenzi	6–2, 6–4
2011	(Italy) Matteo Viola	(Argentina) Guido Pella	6–4, 6–1
2010	(Chile) Paul Capdeville	(Argentina) Diego Junqueira	6–3, 3–6, 6–3
2009	(Ecuador) Nicolás Lapentti	(Colombia) Santiago Giraldo	6–2, 2–6, 7–6(4)
2008	(Argentina) Sergio Roitman	(Argentina) Brian Dabul	7–6, 6–4
2007	(Ecuador) Nicolás Lapentti	(Spain) Daniel Gimeno-Traver	6–3, 6–7, 7–5
2006	(Argentina) Sergio Roitman	(Argentina) Mariano Zabaleta	6–3, 4–6, 6–1
2005	(Brazil) Marcos Daniel	(Brazil) Flávio Saretta	6–2, 1–6, 6–0

=== Doubles ===
Year	Champion	Runner-up	Score
2026	(Ecuador) Diego Hidalgo (Argentina) Mariano Kestelboim	(Poland) Karol Drzewiecki (Poland) Piotr Matuszewski	7–5, 6–7^{(4–7)}, [10–7]
2025	(Mexico) Alex Hernández (Mexico) Rodrigo Pacheco Méndez	(Argentina) Lucio Ratti (Brazil) Victor Hugo Remondy Pagotto	7–5, 6–3
2024	(Poland) Karol Drzewiecki (Poland) Piotr Matuszewski	(Brazil) Luís Britto (Brazil) Marcelo Zormann	6–4, 7–6^{(7–2)}
2023	(Peru) Arklon Huertas del Pino (Peru) Conner Huertas del Pino	(Switzerland) Luca Margaroli (Argentina) Santiago Rodríguez Taverna	6–3, 6–1
2022	(Argentina) Guido Andreozzi (Argentina) Guillermo Durán	(Argentina) Facundo Díaz Acosta (Venezuela) Luis David Martínez	6–0, 6–4
2021	(Netherlands) Jesper de Jong (Netherlands) Bart Stevens	(Ecuador) Diego Hidalgo (Colombia) Cristian Rodríguez	7–5, 6–2
2020	(Venezuela) Luis David Martínez (Brazil) Felipe Meligeni Alves	(Spain) Sergio Martos Gornés (Spain) Jaume Munar	6–0, 4–6, [10–3]
2019	(Uruguay) Ariel Behar (Ecuador) Gonzalo Escobar	(Brazil) Pedro Sakamoto (Brazil) Thiago Seyboth Wild	7–6^{(7–4)}, 7–6^{(7–5)}
2018	(Argentina) Guillermo Durán (Ecuador) Roberto Quiroz	(Brazil) Thiago Monteiro (Brazil) Fabrício Neis	6–3, 6–2
2017	(El Salvador) Marcelo Arévalo (Mexico) Miguel Ángel Reyes-Varela	(Bolivia) Hugo Dellien (Bolivia) Federico Zeballos	6–1, 6–7^{(7–9)}, [10–6]
2016	(Uruguay) Ariel Behar (Brazil) Fabiano de Paula	(El Salvador) Marcelo Arévalo (Peru) Sergio Galdós	6–2, 6–4
2015	(Argentina) Guillermo Durán (Argentina) Andrés Molteni	(Portugal) Gastão Elias (Brazil) Fabricio Neis	6–3, 6–4
2014	(Argentina) Máximo González (Argentina) Guido Pella	(Spain) Pere Riba (Spain) Jordi Samper-Montaña	2–6, 7–6^{(7–3)}, [10–5]
2013	(Netherlands) Stephan Fransen (Netherlands) Wesley Koolhof	(Moldova) Roman Borvanov (Germany) Alexander Satschko	1–6, 6–2, [10–5]
2012	(Argentina) Martín Alund (Argentina) Facundo Bagnis	(Argentina) Leonardo Mayer (Argentina) Martín Ríos-Benítez	7–5, 7–6^{(7–5)}
2011	(Ecuador) Júlio César Campozano (Ecuador) Roberto Quiroz	(Uruguay) Marcel Felder (Brazil) Rodrigo Grilli	6–4, 6–1
2010	(Colombia) Juan Sebastián Cabal (Colombia) Robert Farah	(Brazil) Franco Ferreiro (Brazil) André Sá	7–5, 7–6(3)
2009	(Ecuador) Júlio César Campozano (Ecuador) Emilio Gómez	(Austria) Andreas Haider-Maurer (Germany) Lars Pörschke	6–7(2), 6–3, [10–8]
2008	(Argentina) Sebastián Decoud (Colombia) Santiago Giraldo	(Brazil) Thiago Alves (Brazil) Ricardo Hocevar	6–4, 6–4
2007	(Argentina) Brian Dabul (Argentina) Juan Pablo Guzmán	(Netherlands) Bart Beks (Colombia) Michael Quintero	7–6, 6–3
2006	(Argentina) Juan Pablo Brzezicki (Argentina) Leonardo Mayer	(Uruguay) Marcel Felder (Spain) Fernando Vicente	1–6, 7–5, [14–12]
2005	(Argentina) Juan Martín del Potro (Costa Rica) Juan Antonio Marín	(Peru) Luis Horna (Peru) Iván Miranda	walkover
