= 2016 ZS-Sports China International Challenger – Singles =

Singles
- 2016 ZS-Sports China International Challenger

Final
- Champion: (Serbia) Janko Tipsarević
- Runner-up: (Spain) Rubén Ramírez Hidalgo
- Score: 1–6, 7–5, 6–1

Events
Singles	Doubles
ZS-Sports China International Challenger	· 2017 →

This was the first edition of the tournament.

Janko Tipsarević won the title after defeating Rubén Ramírez Hidalgo 1–6, 7–5, 6–1 in the final.

== Seeds ==
1. (Russia) Konstantin Kravchuk (quarterfinals)
2. (China) Wu Di (second round)
3. (Spain) Enrique López-Pérez (quarterfinals)
4. (China) Zhang Ze (quarterfinals)
5. (South Korea) Lee Duck-hee (first round)
6. (Spain) Pere Riba (semifinals)
7. (Spain) Rubén Ramírez Hidalgo (final)
8. (China) Li Zhe (first round)

== Draw ==
=== Key ===
- Q = Qualifier
- WC = Wild card
- LL = Lucky loser
- Alt = Alternate
- SE = Special exempt
- PR = Protected ranking
- ITF = ITF entry
- JE = Junior exempt
- w/o = Walkover
- r = Retired
- d = Defaulted
- SR = Special ranking

=== Finals ===
Semifinals
(Chinese Taipei) Jason Jung	6	0	6^{5}
7	(Spain) Rubén Ramírez Hidalgo	4	6	7^{7}
6	(Spain) Pere Riba	2	4
Q	(Serbia) Janko Tipsarević	6	6

Final
7	(Spain) Rubén Ramírez Hidalgo	6	5	1
Q	(Serbia) Janko Tipsarević	1	7	6

=== Top half ===
First round
1	(Russia) K Kravchuk	6	6
(China) B Ouyang	1	1
(France) TK Wang	6	6
(Japan) Makoto Ochi	2	2
(India) Karunuday Singh	2	3
(China) X Gao	6	6
(Chinese Taipei) J Jung	7	6
8	(China) Z Li	5	4
3	(Spain) E López-Pérez	6	6
WC	(China) Lyu Chengze	2	2
Q	(India) J Nedunchezhiyan	6^{3}	4
(South Korea) S-w Kwon	7^{7}	6
WC	(China) Zheng Wei Qiang	3	6	6^{2}
(Chinese Taipei) C-h Yi	6	3	7^{7}
(Colombia) N Barrientos	6^{6}	2
7	(Spain) R Ramírez Hidalgo	7^{8}	6

Second round
1	(Russia) K Kravchuk	6	4
(France) TK Wang	4	3
(China) X Gao
(Chinese Taipei) J Jung	w/o
3	(Spain) E López-Pérez	6	3	4
(South Korea) S-w Kwon	1	6	0^{r}
(Chinese Taipei) C-h Yi	2	0
7	(Spain) R Ramírez Hidalgo	6	6

Quarterfinals
1	(Russia) K Kravchuk	4	5
(Chinese Taipei) J Jung	6	7
3	(Spain) E López-Pérez	5	4
7	(Spain) R Ramírez Hidalgo	7	6

Semifinals
(Chinese Taipei) J Jung	6	0	6^{5}
7	(Spain) R Ramírez Hidalgo	4	6	7^{7}

=== Bottom half ===
First round
6	(Spain) P Riba	6	6
(Japan) K Uchida	3	4
(Russia) E Karlovskiy	6	4	2
(India) P Gunneswaran	2	6	6
(Japan) K Takeuchi	7	6
(China) F Sun	5	0
(Chinese Taipei) J Wang	5	6	2
4	(China) Z Zhang	7	1	6
5	(South Korea) D-h Lee	1	2
Q	(Serbia) D Petrović	6	6
Q	(China) Y He	6^{2}	5
WC	(China) R Te	7^{7}	7
Q	(Serbia) J Tipsarević	6	6
WC	(China) Y Wu	2	0
(Spain) Albert Alcaraz Ivorra	2	6^{4}
2/Alt	(China) D Wu	6	7^{7}

Second round
6	(Spain) P Riba	4	6	6
(India) P Gunneswaran	6	0	2
(Japan) K Takeuchi	2	2
4	(China) Z Zhang	6	6
Q	(Serbia) D Petrović	6	6
WC	(China) R Te	0	2
Q	(Serbia) J Tipsarević	6	6
2/Alt	(China) D Wu	2	2

Quarterfinals
6	(Spain) P Riba	6	6
4	(China) Z Zhang	3	4
Q	(Serbia) D Petrović	4	3
Q	(Serbia) J Tipsarević	6	6

Semifinals
6	(Spain) P Riba	2	4
Q	(Serbia) J Tipsarević	6	6
