= 2016 Chengdu Challenger – Singles =

Singles
- 2016 Chengdu Challenger

Final
- Champion: (Chinese Taipei) Jason Jung
- Runner-up: (Spain) Rubén Ramírez Hidalgo
- Score: 6–4, 6–2

Events
Singles	Doubles
Chengdu Challenger	· 2017 →

This was the first edition of the tournament.

Jason Jung won the title, defeating Rubén Ramírez Hidalgo in the final, 6–4, 6–2.

== Seeds ==
1. (Russia) Konstantin Kravchuk (first round)
2. (Japan) Go Soeda (first round)
3. (Russia) Alexander Kudryavtsev (first round)
4. (China) Wu Di (second round)
5. (China) Zhang Ze (quarterfinals)
6. (Spain) Enrique López Pérez (second round)
7. (South Korea) Lee Duck-hee (semifinals)
8. (Spain) Pere Riba (first round)

== Draw ==
=== Key ===
- Q = Qualifier
- WC = Wild card
- LL = Lucky loser
- Alt = Alternate
- ITF = ITF entry
- PR = Protected ranking
- SR = Special ranking
- SE = Special exempt
- JE = Junior exempt
- JR = Junior Accelerator Programme entrant
- CO = College Accelerator Programme entrant
- NG = Next Gen Accelerator Program entrant
- w/o = Walkover
- r = Retired
- d = Defaulted

=== Finals ===
Semifinals
7	(South Korea) Lee Duck-hee	4	1
(Chinese Taipei) Jason Jung	6	6
Q	(Japan) Yuya Kibi	2	3
(Spain) Rubén Ramírez Hidalgo	6	6

Final
(Chinese Taipei) Jason Jung	6	6
(Spain) Rubén Ramírez Hidalgo	4	2

=== Top half ===
First round
1	(Russia) K Kravchuk	7^{7}	6^{2}	6^{5}
(Slovenia) B Kavčič	6^{2}	7^{7}	7^{7}
Q	(China) F Sun	2	7	6
(Japan) Shuichi Sekiguchi	6	5	3
PR	(India) Karunuday Singh	5	4
WC	(China) R Te	7	6
WC	(China) B Ouyang	3	4
7	(South Korea) D-h Lee	6	6
4	(China) D Wu	1
(Chinese Taipei) T-h Yang	1^{r}
(Japan) K Uchida	2	4
(Chinese Taipei) J Jung	6	6
Q	(Japan) T Niki	3	6	6
(India) P Gunneswaran	6	3	2
(Chinese Taipei) J Wang	3	2
6	(Spain) E López Pérez	6	6

Second round
(Slovenia) B Kavčič	3	3
Q	(China) F Sun	6	6
WC	(China) R Te	4	6	5
7	(South Korea) D-h Lee	6	2	7
4	(China) D Wu	5	2
(Chinese Taipei) J Jung	7	6
Q	(Japan) T Niki	3	6	6
6	(Spain) E López Pérez	6	4	1

Quarterfinals
Q	(China) F Sun	4	4
7	(South Korea) D-h Lee	6	6
(Chinese Taipei) J Jung	6	6
Q	(Japan) T Niki	4	2

Semifinals
7	(South Korea) D-h Lee	4	1
(Chinese Taipei) J Jung	6	6

=== Bottom half ===
First round
8	(Spain) P Riba	6	3	6^{6}
Q	(Japan) Yuya Kibi	3	6	7^{8}
(South Korea) S-w Kwon	1	6	4
(Chinese Taipei) T Chen	6	4	6
WC	(China) Y He	3	4
(Colombia) N Barrientos	6	6
(China) Z Li	7^{7}	6^{5}	6
3	(Russia) A Kudryavtsev	6^{5}	7^{7}	1
5	(China) Z Zhang	7	6
WC	(Serbia) J Tipsarević	5	3
(Italy) A Bega	6	6^{4}	6
Q	(Russia) E Karlovskiy	4	7^{7}	4
(Serbia) D Petrović	7^{7}	6^{10}	0
(Spain) R Ramírez Hidalgo	6^{4}	7^{12}	6
(Croatia) A Pavić	7^{7}	4	6
2	(Japan) G Soeda	6^{5}	6	4

Second round
Q	(Japan) Y Kibi	1	6	6
(Chinese Taipei) T Chen	6	3	3
(Colombia) N Barrientos	5	6	3
(China) Z Li	7	4	6
5	(China) Z Zhang	6	7
(Italy) A Bega	1	5
(Spain) R Ramírez Hidalgo	3	6	7
(Croatia) A Pavić	6	3	5

Quarterfinals
Q	(Japan) Y Kibi	6	7^{7}
(China) Z Li	4	6^{3}
5	(China) Z Zhang	1	1
(Spain) R Ramírez Hidalgo	6	6

Semifinals
Q	(Japan) Y Kibi	2	3
(Spain) R Ramírez Hidalgo	6	6
