= 2018 Chengdu Challenger – Singles =

Singles
- 2018 Chengdu Challenger

Final
- Champion: (China) Zhang Ze
- Runner-up: (Switzerland) Henri Laaksonen
- Score: 2–6, 5–2 ret.

Events
Singles	Doubles
← 2017 ·	Chengdu Challenger	· 2019 →

Lu Yen-hsun was the defending champion but chose not to defend his title.

Zhang Ze won the title after Henri Laaksonen retired at 2–6, 5–2 in the final.

== Seeds ==
1. (Switzerland) Henri Laaksonen (final, retired)
2. (Japan) Go Soeda (first round)
3. (Serbia) Nikola Milojević (first round)
4. (Kazakhstan) Alexander Bublik (second round)
5. (Japan) Tatsuma Ito (quarterfinals, retired)
6. (Japan) Hiroki Moriya (first round)
7. (Serbia) Peđa Krstin (second round)
8. (Chinese Taipei) Yang Tsung-hua (first round)

== Draw ==
=== Key ===
- Q = Qualifier
- WC = Wild card
- LL = Lucky loser
- Alt = Alternate
- SE = Special exempt
- PR = Protected ranking
- ITF = ITF entry
- JE = Junior exempt
- w/o = Walkover
- r = Retired
- d = Defaulted
- SR = Special ranking

=== Finals ===
Semifinals
1	(Switzerland) Henri Laaksonen	2	6	6
(United Kingdom) James Ward	6	4	1
(China) Zhang Ze	6	7^{8}
(Australia) Akira Santillan	4	6^{6}

Final
1	(Switzerland) Henri Laaksonen	6	2^{r}
(China) Zhang Ze	2	5

=== Top half ===
First round
1	(Switzerland) H Laaksonen	6	2	7^{7}
WC	(China) R Te	3	6	6^{2}
(Japan) Renta Tokuda	2	2
Q	(France) TK Wang	6	6
(China) Y Wu	6	6
WC	(China) X Gao	0	1
(China) Z Li	3	4
7	(Serbia) P Krstin	6	6
3	(Serbia) N Milojević	4	4
(South Korea) D-h Lee	6	6
(Japan) Y Takahashi	3	3
(United Kingdom) J Ward	6	6
(Russia) R Safiullin	6	7^{7}
Q	(Australia) B Ellis	3	6^{3}
WC	(China) Zh Zhang	6	6
8	(Chinese Taipei) T-h Yang	4	4

Second round
1	(Switzerland) H Laaksonen	6	5	7^{7}
Q	(France) TK Wang	4	7	6^{4}
(China) Y Wu	6^{4}	6	6
7	(Serbia) P Krstin	7^{7}	4	4
(South Korea) D-h Lee	6	5	3
(United Kingdom) J Ward	4	7	6
(Russia) R Safiullin	4	6	6
WC	(China) Zh Zhang	6	4	1

Quarterfinals
1	(Switzerland) H Laaksonen	6^{3}	6	6
(China) Y Wu	7^{7}	2	3
(United Kingdom) J Ward	6	4	6
(Russia) R Safiullin	2	6	3

Semifinals
1	(Switzerland) H Laaksonen	2	6	6
(United Kingdom) J Ward	6	4	1

=== Bottom half ===
First round
5	(Japan) T Ito	7^{7}	7^{7}
(Serbia) D Petrović	6^{5}	6^{3}
Alt	(India) A Kadhe	2	4
Q	(Netherlands) Miliaan Niesten	6	6
(China) Ze Zhang	7	6
(China) D Wu	5	2
Q	(Japan) Makoto Ochi	2	5
4	(Kazakhstan) A Bublik	6	7
6	(Japan) H Moriya	6	6^{5}	4
(Australia) A Popyrin	4	7^{7}	6
(Kazakhstan) D Yevseyev	7	6
(Australia) M Banes	5	1
(Australia) A Santillan	6^{1}	7	7^{7}
(Finland) H Heliövaara	7^{7}	5	6^{2}
WC	(China) Xia Zihao	7^{7}	6
2	(Japan) G Soeda	6^{2}	3

Second round
5	(Japan) T Ito	6	6
Q	(Netherlands) M Niesten	4	1
(China) Ze Zhang	4	6	6
4	(Kazakhstan) A Bublik	6	4	2
(Australia) A Popyrin	1	6^{5}
(Kazakhstan) D Yevseyev	6	7^{7}
(Australia) A Santillan	3	6	7
WC	(China) Z Xia	6	2	5

Quarterfinals
5	(Japan) T Ito	4	0^{r}
(China) Ze Zhang	6	3
(Kazakhstan) D Yevseyev	5	2
(Australia) A Santillan	7	6

Semifinals
(China) Ze Zhang	6	7^{8}
(Australia) A Santillan	4	6^{6}
