= 2016 Chengdu Challenger – Doubles =

Doubles
- 2016 Chengdu Challenger

Final
- Champion: (China) Gong Maoxin (China) Zhang Ze
- Runner-up: (China) Gao Xin (China) Li Zhe
- Score: 6–3, 4–6, [13–11]

Events
Singles	Doubles
Chengdu Challenger	· 2017 →

This was the first edition of the tournament.

Gong Maoxin and Zhang Ze won the title after defeating Gao Xin and Li Zhe 6–3, 4–6, [13–11] in the final.

== Seeds ==
1. (Colombia) Nicolás Barrientos / (Chinese Taipei) Peng Hsien-yin (first round)
2. (Chinese Taipei) Hsieh Cheng-peng / (Chinese Taipei) Yang Tsung-hua (first round)
3. (India) Jeevan Nedunchezhiyan / (Chinese Taipei) Yi Chu-huan (semifinals)
4. (China) Gong Maoxin / (China) Zhang Ze (champions)

== Draw ==
=== Key ===
- Q = Qualifier
- WC = Wild card
- LL = Lucky loser
- Alt = Alternate
- SE = Special exempt
- PR = Protected ranking
- ITF = ITF entry
- JE = Junior exempt
- w/o = Walkover
- r = Retired
- d = Defaulted
- SR = Special ranking

First round
1	(Colombia) N Barrientos (Chinese Taipei) H-y Peng	5	6	[8]
(China) X Gao (China) Z Li	7	3	[10]
WC	(China) Cai Zhao (China) Zhong Suhao	4	4
(South Korea) S-w Kwon (Japan) K Uchida	6	6
3	(India) J Nedunchezhiyan (Chinese Taipei) C-h Yi	7	7^{7}
(Chinese Taipei) T Chen (Spain) E López-Pérez	5	6^{5}
(Italy) A Bega (Croatia) A Pavić	6	6
WC	(China) Y He (China) F Sun	2	4
WC	(China) B Ouyang (China) Z Qiu	3	2
(Spain) R Ramírez Hidalgo (Spain) P Riba	6	6
(Russia) E Karlovskiy (Serbia) D Petrović	3	6	[7]
4	(China) M Gong (China) Z Zhang	6	4	[10]
(United States) JP Fruttero (Chinese Taipei) J Jung	6	6^{6}	[3]
(Japan) T Matsui (Japan) G Soeda	4	7^{8}	[10]
(Chinese Taipei) J Wang (China) D Wu	6	6
2	(Chinese Taipei) C-p Hsieh (Chinese Taipei) T-h Yang	2	1

Quarterfinals
(China) X Gao (China) Z Li	7^{7}	6
(South Korea) S-w Kwon (Japan) K Uchida	6^{5}	4
3	(India) J Nedunchezhiyan (Chinese Taipei) C-h Yi	6	6
(Italy) A Bega (Croatia) A Pavić	1	0
(Spain) R Ramírez Hidalgo (Spain) P Riba	4	4
4	(China) M Gong (China) Z Zhang	6	6
(Japan) T Matsui (Japan) G Soeda	2	3
(Chinese Taipei) J Wang (China) D Wu	6	6

Semifinals
(China) X Gao (China) Z Li	6	6
3	(India) J Nedunchezhiyan (Chinese Taipei) C-h Yi	4	3
4	(China) M Gong (China) Z Zhang	6	6
(Chinese Taipei) J Wang (China) D Wu	3	4

Final
(China) X Gao (China) Z Li	3	6	[11]
4	(China) M Gong (China) Z Zhang	6	4	[13]
