= 2018 Chengdu Challenger – Doubles =

Doubles
- 2018 Chengdu Challenger

Final
- Champions: (China) Gong Maoxin (China) Zhang Ze
- Runners-up: (Russia) Mikhail Elgin (Belarus) Yaraslav Shyla
- Score: 6–4, 6–4

Events
Singles	Doubles
← 2017 ·	Chengdu Challenger	· 2019 →

Sriram Balaji and Vishnu Vardhan were the defending champions but chose not to defend their title.

Gong Maoxin and Zhang Ze won the title after defeating Mikhail Elgin and Yaraslav Shyla 6–4, 6–4 in the final.

== Seeds ==
1. (Chinese Taipei) Hsieh Cheng-peng / (Indonesia) Christopher Rungkat (semifinals)
2. (Thailand) Sanchai Ratiwatana / (Thailand) Sonchat Ratiwatana (semifinals)
3. (China) Gong Maoxin / (China) Zhang Ze (champions)
4. (Russia) Mikhail Elgin / (Belarus) Yaraslav Shyla (final)

== Draw ==
=== Key ===
- Q = Qualifier
- WC = Wild card
- LL = Lucky loser
- Alt = Alternate
- SE = Special exempt
- PR = Protected ranking
- ITF = ITF entry
- JE = Junior exempt
- w/o = Walkover
- r = Retired
- d = Defaulted
- SR = Special ranking

First round
1	(Chinese Taipei) C-p Hsieh (Indonesia) C Rungkat	6	5	[10]
WC	(China) X Gao (China) R Te	4	7	[8]
(Chinese Taipei) T Chen (Chinese Taipei) C-h Yi	7^{7}	6
(Finland) H Heliövaara (Switzerland) H Laaksonen	6^{5}	3
4	(Russia) M Elgin (Belarus) Y Shyla	6	7
WC	(China) Xia Zihao (China) Zheng Wei Qiang	2	5
(Kazakhstan) A Bublik (Russia) A Pavlioutchenkov	1	4
(India) A Kadhe (Japan) H Moriya	6	6
(Chinese Taipei) H-y Peng (Australia) A Santillan	4	7	[10]
(Serbia) N Milojević (Chinese Taipei) T-h Yang	6	5	[2]
WC	(China) R Hua (China) Zh Zhang	4	4
3	(China) M Gong (China) Ze Zhang	6	6
(China) Z Li (China) D Wu	6	1	[8]
(Serbia) P Krstin (Serbia) D Petrović	1	6	[10]
(Zimbabwe) B Lock (Japan) T Matsui	4	4
2	(Thailand) Sa Ratiwatana (Thailand) So Ratiwatana	6	6

Quarterfinals
1	(Chinese Taipei) C-p Hsieh (Indonesia) C Rungkat	7^{8}	6
(Chinese Taipei) T Chen (Chinese Taipei) C-h Yi	6^{6}	3
4	(Russia) M Elgin (Belarus) Y Shyla	6	6
(India) A Kadhe (Japan) H Moriya	4	4
(Chinese Taipei) H-y Peng (Australia) A Santillan	5	6^{2}
3	(China) M Gong (China) Ze Zhang	7	7^{7}
(Serbia) P Krstin (Serbia) D Petrović	4	4
2	(Thailand) Sa Ratiwatana (Thailand) So Ratiwatana	6	6

Semifinals
1	(Chinese Taipei) C-p Hsieh (Indonesia) C Rungkat	6^{3}	2
4	(Russia) M Elgin (Belarus) Y Shyla	7^{7}	6
3	(China) M Gong (China) Ze Zhang	6	6
2	(Thailand) Sa Ratiwatana (Thailand) So Ratiwatana	0	4

Final
4	(Russia) M Elgin (Belarus) Y Shyla	4	4
3	(China) M Gong (China) Ze Zhang	6	6
