= 2017 ZS-Sports China International Challenger – Doubles =

Doubles
- 2017 ZS-Sports China International Challenger

Final
- Champions: (Germany) Gero Kretschmer (Germany) Alexander Satschko
- Runners-up: (Germany) Andreas Mies (Germany) Oscar Otte
- Score: 2–6, 7–6^{(8–6)}, [10–3]

Events
Singles	Doubles
← 2016 ·	ZS-Sports China International Challenger

Danilo Petrović and Tak Khunn Wang were the defending champions but chose not to defend their title.

Gero Kretschmer and Alexander Satschko won the title after defeating Andreas Mies and Oscar Otte 2–6, 7–6^{(8–6)}, [10–3] in the final.

== Seeds ==
1. (Chile) Hans Podlipnik-Castillo / (Belarus) Andrei Vasilevski (semifinals)
2. (Croatia) Dino Marcan / (Austria) Tristan-Samuel Weissborn (quarterfinals)
3. (Australia) Jordan Thompson / (Australia) Andrew Whittington (semifinals)
4. (China) Gong Maoxin / (China) Zhang Ze (first round)

== Draw ==
Key

- Q = Qualifier
- WC = Wild card
- LL = Lucky loser
- Alt = Alternate
- ITF = ITF entry
- PR = Protected ranking
- SR = Special ranking
- SE = Special exempt
- JE = Junior exempt
- JR = Junior Accelerator Programme entrant
- CO = College Accelerator Programme entrant
- NG = Next Gen Accelerator Program entrant
- w/o = Walkover
- r = Retired
- d = Defaulted

First round
1	(Chile) H Podlipnik-Castillo (Belarus) A Vasilevski	7	6
(Slovenia) B Kavčič (Serbia) M Tepavac	5	4
PR	(Serbia) I Bozoljac (Serbia) N Milojević	7	7^{7}
(Italy) T Fabbiano (Italy) L Vanni	5	6^{5}
4	(China) M Gong (China) Ze Zhang	0	7^{10}	[5]
PR	(Germany) G Kretschmer (Germany) A Satschko	6	6^{8}	[10]
WC	(China) Y Bai (China) D Wu	7	6
WC	(China) Y He (China) Zh Zhang	5	4
WC	(China) S Liu (China) Zheng Wei Qiang	2	4
(Kazakhstan) A Nedovyesov (Chinese Taipei) H-y Peng	6	6
PR	(Russia) T Gabashvili (Spain) D Muñoz de la Nava	6^{4}	6^{5}
3	(Australia) J Thompson (Australia) A Whittington	7^{7}	7^{7}
(Germany) A Mies (Germany) O Otte	6	6^{3}	[10]
(Belarus) A Bury (Ukraine) D Molchanov	2	7^{7}	[5]
(Italy) R Ghedin (France) Q Halys	4	4
2	(Croatia) D Marcan (Austria) T-S Weissborn	6	6

Quarterfinals
1	(Chile) H Podlipnik-Castillo (Belarus) A Vasilevski	6	7^{7}
PR	(Serbia) I Bozoljac (Serbia) N Milojević	4	6^{5}
PR	(Germany) G Kretschmer (Germany) A Satschko	7^{7}	6
WC	(China) Y Bai (China) D Wu	6^{4}	4
(Kazakhstan) A Nedovyesov (Chinese Taipei) H-y Peng	3	5
3	(Australia) J Thompson (Australia) A Whittington	6	7
(Germany) A Mies (Germany) O Otte	6	6
2	(Croatia) D Marcan (Austria) T-S Weissborn	3	3

Semifinals
1	(Chile) H Podlipnik-Castillo (Belarus) A Vasilevski	4	4
PR	(Germany) G Kretschmer (Germany) A Satschko	6	6
3	(Australia) J Thompson (Australia) A Whittington	3	4
(Germany) A Mies (Germany) O Otte	6	6

Final
PR	(Germany) G Kretschmer (Germany) A Satschko	2	7^{8}	[10]
(Germany) A Mies (Germany) O Otte	6	6^{6}	[3]
