= 2018 Chengdu Challenger =

- Date: 30 July – 5 August
- Edition: 3rd
- Surface: Hard
- Location: Chengdu, China

Champions

Singles
- (China) Zhang Ze

Doubles
- (China) Gong Maoxin / (China) Zhang Ze
← 2017 ·	Chengdu Challenger	· 2019 →

The 2018 Chengdu Challenger was a professional tennis tournament played on hard courts. It was the 3rd edition of the tournament which was part of the 2018 ATP Challenger Tour. It took place in Chengdu, China between 30 July and 5 August 2018.

== Singles main-draw entrants ==
=== Seeds ===
Country	Player	Rank^{1}	Seed
SUI	Henri Laaksonen	135	1
JPN	Go Soeda	154	2
SRB	Nikola Milojević	160	3
KAZ	Alexander Bublik	165	4
JPN	Tatsuma Ito	171	5
JPN	Hiroki Moriya	202	6
SRB	Peđa Krstin	208	7
TPE	Yang Tsung-hua	211	8

- ^{1} Rankings are as of 23 July 2018.

=== Other entrants ===
The following players received wildcards into the singles main draw:

- (China) Gao Xin
- (China) Te Rigele
- (China) Xia Zihao
- (China) Zhang Zhizhen

The following player received entry into the singles main draw as an alternate:

- (India) Arjun Kadhe

The following players received entry from the qualifying draw:

- (Australia) Blake Ellis
- (Netherlands) Miliaan Niesten
- (Japan) Makoto Ochi
- (France) Tak Khunn Wang

== Champions ==
=== Singles ===
- (China) Zhang Ze def. (Switzerland) Henri Laaksonen 2–6, 5–2 ret.

=== Doubles ===
- (China) Gong Maoxin / (China) Zhang Ze def. (Russia) Mikhail Elgin / (Belarus) Yaraslav Shyla 6–4, 6–4.
