= 2016 ZS-Sports China International Challenger =

- Date: 8–14 August
- Edition: 1st
- Surface: Clay
- Location: Qingdao, China

Champions

Singles
- (Serbia) Janko Tipsarević

Doubles
- (Serbia) Danilo Petrović / (France) Tak Khunn Wang
ZS-Sports China International Challenger	· 2017 →

The 2016 ZS-Sports China International Challenger was a professional tennis tournament played on clay courts. It was the 1st edition of the tournament which was part of the 2016 ATP Challenger Tour. It took place in Qingdao, China between 8 and 14 August 2016.

== Singles main-draw entrants ==
=== Seeds ===
Country	Player	Rank^{1}	Seed
RUS	Konstantin Kravchuk	96	1
CHN	Wu Di	177	2
ESP	Enrique López Pérez	184	3
CHN	Zhang Ze	187	4
KOR	Lee Duck-hee	189	5
ESP	Pere Riba	201	6
ESP	Rubén Ramírez Hidalgo	206	7
CHN	Li Zhe	261	8

- ^{1} Rankings are as of August 1, 2016.

=== Other entrants ===
The following players received wildcards into the singles main draw:

- (China) Lyu Chengze
- (China) Zheng Wei Qiang
- (China) Te Rigele
- (China) Wu Yibing

The following players entered as an alternate:

- (China) Di Wu

The following players received entry from the qualifying draw:

- (India) Jeevan Nedunchezhiyan
- (Serbia) Danilo Petrović
- (Serbia) Janko Tipsarević
- (China) He Yecong

== Champions ==
=== Singles ===
- (Serbia) Janko Tipsarević def. (Spain) Rubén Ramírez Hidalgo, 1–6, 7–5, 6–1

=== Doubles ===
- (Serbia) Danilo Petrović / (France) Tak Khunn Wang def. (China) Gong Maoxin / (China) Zhang Ze, 6–2, 4–6, [10–5]
