= 2016 ZS-Sports China International Challenger – Doubles =

First edition

Doubles
- 2016 ZS-Sports China International Challenger

Final
- Champions: (Serbia) Danilo Petrović (France) Tak Khunn Wang
- Runners-up: (China) Gong Maoxin (China) Zhang Ze
- Score: 6–2, 4–6, [10–5]

Events
| Singles | Doubles |
| ZS-Sports China International Challenger | · 2017 → |

This was the first edition of the tournament.

Danilo Petrović and Tak Khunn Wang won the title after defeating Gong Maoxin and Zhang Ze 6–2, 4–6, [10–5] in the final.

== Seeds ==
1. (India) Jeevan Nedunchezhiyan / (Chinese Taipei) Yi Chu-huan (quarterfinals)
2. (China) Gong Maoxin / (China) Zhang Ze (final)
3. (Colombia) Nicolás Barrientos / (Japan) Toshihide Matsui (quarterfinals)
4. (Spain) Enrique López-Pérez / (Chinese Taipei) Peng Hsien-yin (semifinals)

== Draw ==
=== Key ===
- Q = Qualifier
- WC = Wild card
- LL = Lucky loser
- Alt = Alternate
- SE = Special exempt
- PR = Protected ranking
- ITF = ITF entry
- JE = Junior exempt
- w/o = Walkover
- r = Retired
- d = Defaulted
- SR = Special ranking

First round
1 | (India) J Nedunchezhiyan (Chinese Taipei) C-h Yi | 4 | 6 | [10]
(China) X Gao (China) Z Li | 6 | 3 | [6]
WC | (China) R Te (China) Zheng Wei Qiang | 2 | 1
(Serbia) D Petrović (France) TK Wang | 6 | 6
4 | (Spain) E López-Pérez (Chinese Taipei) H-y Peng | 6 | 6
WC | (China) B Ouyang (China) Z Qiu | 1 | 3
(Spain) R Ramírez Hidalgo (Spain) P Riba | 6 | 6^{5} | [8]
(Russia) E Karlovskiy (Russia) K Kravchuk | 3 | 7^{7} | [10]
(Spain) Albert Alcaraz Ivorra (Japan) K Uchida | 6 | 6
WC | (China) Cai Zi Yang (China) Liu Yang | 0 | 0
(Japan) Makoto Ochi (China) F Sun | 1 | 3
3 | (Colombia) N Barrientos (Japan) T Matsui | 6 | 6
(United States) JP Fruttero (Chinese Taipei) J Jung | 6^{2} | 1
(Chinese Taipei) J Wang (China) D Wu | 7^{7} | 6
PR | (India) Karunuday Singh (Japan) K Takeuchi | 0 | 2
2 | (China) M Gong (China) Z Zhang | 6 | 6

Quarterfinals
1 | (India) J Nedunchezhiyan (Chinese Taipei) C-h Yi | 6^{10} | 6^{1}
(Serbia) D Petrović (France) TK Wang | 7^{12} | 7^{7}
4 | (Spain) E López-Pérez (Chinese Taipei) H-y Peng | 6 | 2 | [10]
(Russia) E Karlovskiy (Russia) K Kravchuk | 3 | 6 | [8]
(Spain) A Alcaraz Ivorra (Japan) K Uchida | 6 | 6
3 | (Colombia) N Barrientos (Japan) T Matsui | 1 | 4
(Chinese Taipei) J Wang (China) D Wu | 6^{9} | 3
2 | (China) M Gong (China) Z Zhang | 7^{11} | 6

Semifinals
(Serbia) D Petrović (France) TK Wang | 4 | 6 | [10]
4 | (Spain) E López-Pérez (Chinese Taipei) H-y Peng | 6 | 3 | [1]
(Spain) A Alcaraz Ivorra (Japan) K Uchida | 3 | 6^{5}
2 | (China) M Gong (China) Z Zhang | 6 | 7^{7}

Final
(Serbia) D Petrović (France) TK Wang | 6 | 4 | [10]
2 | (China) M Gong (China) Z Zhang | 2 | 6 | [5]
