= 2017 ZS-Sports China International Challenger – Singles =

Singles
- 2017 ZS-Sports China International Challenger

Final
- Champion: (Serbia) Janko Tipsarević
- Runner-up: (Germany) Oscar Otte
- Score: 6–3, 7–6^{(11–9)}

Events
Singles	Doubles
- ZS-Sports China International Challenger

Janko Tipsarević was the defending champion and successfully defended his title, defeating Oscar Otte 6–3, 7–6^{(11–9)} in the final.

== Seeds ==
1. (Australia) Jordan Thompson (quarterfinals)
2. (Serbia) Janko Tipsarević (champion)
3. (Italy) Luca Vanni (first round)
4. (Slovenia) Blaž Kavčič (first round)
5. (France) Quentin Halys (semifinals)
6. (France) Mathias Bourgue (semifinals)
7. (Slovakia) Andrej Martin (quarterfinals)
8. (Russia) Teymuraz Gabashvili (first round)

== Draw ==
Key

- Q = Qualifier
- WC = Wild card
- LL = Lucky loser
- Alt = Alternate
- ITF = ITF entry
- PR = Protected ranking
- SR = Special ranking
- SE = Special exempt
- JE = Junior exempt
- JR = Junior Accelerator Programme entrant
- CO = College Accelerator Programme entrant
- NG = Next Gen Accelerator Program entrant
- w/o = Walkover
- r = Retired
- d = Defaulted

=== Finals ===
Semifinals
5	(France) Quentin Halys	5	4
Q	(Germany) Oscar Otte	7	6
6	(France) Mathias Bourgue	3	4
2	(Serbia) Janko Tipsarević	6	6

Final
Q	(Germany) Oscar Otte	3	6^{9}
2	(Serbia) Janko Tipsarević	6	7^{11}

=== Top half ===
First round
1	(Australia) J Thompson	6	6
Q	(Germany) P Torebko	1	4
(Serbia) N Milojević	6	6
(Serbia) M Tepavac	3	2
(Hungary) A Balázs	3	4
WC	(China) Y Bai	6	6
(Australia) A Whittington	0	0
5	(France) Q Halys	6	6
3	(Italy) L Vanni	7^{7}	1	4
(Australia) A De Minaur	6^{4}	6	6
Q	(Germany) O Otte	6	6
WC	(China) Wang Aoxiong	1	0
(France) S Doumbia	6	6
WC	(China) Y He	1	3
(China) D Wu	6	6
8	(Russia) T Gabashvili	3	2

Second round
1	(Australia) J Thompson	6	3	6
(Serbia) N Milojević	3	6	1
WC	(China) Y Bai	1	4
5	(France) Q Halys	6	6
(Australia) A De Minaur	1	1
Q	(Germany) O Otte	6	6
(France) S Doumbia	6	4	1
(China) D Wu	1	6	6

Quarterfinals
1	(Australia) J Thompson	4	1
5	(France) Q Halys	6	6
Q	(Germany) O Otte	6	6
(China) D Wu	0	1

Semifinals
5	(France) Q Halys	5	4
Q	(Germany) O Otte	7	6

=== Bottom half ===
First round
6	(France) M Bourgue	6	6
WC	(China) F Sun	0	2
(Poland) K Majchrzak	7	4	3
Q	(Canada) F Auger-Aliassime	5	6	6
Q	(Ukraine) D Molchanov	1	0
(Belgium) K Coppejans	6	6
(Italy) G Quinzi	6	6
4	(Slovenia) B Kavčič	4	4
7	(Slovakia) A Martin	6	7^{7}
(Kazakhstan) A Nedovyesov	4	6^{5}
(Egypt) K-M Maamoun	3	1
(Italy) T Fabbiano	6	6
(Belarus) I Ivashka	4	6	6
(China) Z Zhang	6	1	2
PR	(Spain) D Muñoz de la Nava	3	6^{1}
2	(Serbia) J Tipsarević	6	7^{7}

Second round
6	(France) M Bourgue	6	6
Q	(Canada) F Auger-Aliassime	3	2
(Belgium) K Coppejans	3	6	6
(Italy) G Quinzi	6	3	2
7	(Slovakia) A Martin	6^{1}	6	6
(Italy) T Fabbiano	7^{7}	4	1
(Belarus) I Ivashka	3	3
2	(Serbia) J Tipsarević	6	6

Quarterfinals
6	(France) M Bourgue	6	6
(Belgium) K Coppejans	1	4
7	(Slovakia) A Martin	4	1
2	(Serbia) J Tipsarević	6	6

Semifinals
6	(France) M Bourgue	3	4
2	(Serbia) J Tipsarević	6	6
