= 2019 Chengdu Challenger – Doubles =

Doubles
- 2019 Chengdu Challenger

Final
- Champions: (India) Arjun Kadhe (India) Saketh Myneni
- Runners-up: (South Korea) Nam Ji-sung (South Korea) Song Min-kyu
- Score: 6–3, 0–6, [10–6]

Events
| Singles | Doubles |
- Chengdu Challenger

Gong Maoxin and Zhang Ze were the defending champions but lost in the quarterfinals to Arjun Kadhe and Saketh Myneni.

Kadhe and Myneni won the title after defeating Nam Ji-sung and Song Min-kyu 6–3, 0–6, [10–6] in the final.

== Seeds ==
1. (China) Gong Maoxin / (China) Zhang Ze (quarterfinals)
2. (Portugal) Gonçalo Oliveira / (Chinese Taipei) Yang Tsung-hua (first round)
3. (Finland) Harri Heliövaara / (Japan) Toshihide Matsui (semifinals)
4. (Thailand) Sanchai Ratiwatana / (Thailand) Sonchat Ratiwatana (first round)

== Draw ==
Key

- Q = Qualifier
- WC = Wild card
- LL = Lucky loser
- Alt = Alternate
- ITF = ITF entry
- PR = Protected ranking
- SR = Special ranking
- SE = Special exempt
- JE = Junior exempt
- JR = Junior Accelerator Programme entrant
- CO = College Accelerator Programme entrant
- NG = Next Gen Accelerator Program entrant
- w/o = Walkover
- r = Retired
- d = Defaulted

First round
1 | (China) M Gong (China) Ze Zhang | 6 | 6
ITF | (Australia) H Bourchier (Australia) T Fancutt | 2 | 0
(Australia) B Ellis (United Kingdom) B Klein
(India) A Kadhe (India) S Myneni | w/o
4 | (Thailand) Sa Ratiwatana (Thailand) So Ratiwatana | 5 | 3
(China) R Hua (China) D Wu | 7 | 6
ITF | (Ukraine) V Orlov (United States) E Zhu | 6 | 6
WC | (China) J Cui (China) Xia Zihao | 4 | 3
(South Korea) Y-s Chung (Chinese Taipei) T-l Wu | 3 | 2
WC | (China) Chuh Wang (China) Zh Zhang | 6 | 6
(Zimbabwe) B Lock (Zimbabwe) CJ Lock | 6^{2} | 6^{4}
3 | (Finland) H Heliövaara (Japan) T Matsui | 7^{7} | 7^{7}
(South Korea) J-s Nam (South Korea) M-k Song | 6 | 6
WC | (China) Liu Hanyi (China) Wang Chukang | 2 | 2
(United States) JP Fruttero (Philippines) R Gonzales | 4 | 6 | [10]
2 | (Portugal) G Oliveira (Chinese Taipei) T-h Yang | 6 | 3 | [6]

Quarterfinals
1 | (China) M Gong (China) Ze Zhang | 6^{4} | 1
(India) A Kadhe (India) S Myneni | 7^{7} | 6
(China) R Hua (China) D Wu | 6 | 7^{7}
ITF | (Ukraine) V Orlov (United States) E Zhu | 1 | 6^{0}
WC | (China) Chuh Wang (China) Zh Zhang | 3 | 6^{3}
3 | (Finland) H Heliövaara (Japan) T Matsui | 6 | 7^{7}
(South Korea) J-s Nam (South Korea) M-k Song | 6 | 7^{7}
(United States) JP Fruttero (Philippines) R Gonzales | 4 | 6^{1}

Semifinals
(India) A Kadhe (India) S Myneni | 6 | 7
(China) R Hua (China) D Wu | 1 | 5
3 | (Finland) H Heliövaara (Japan) T Matsui | 4 | 1
(South Korea) J-s Nam (South Korea) M-k Song | 6 | 6

Final
(India) A Kadhe (India) S Myneni | 6 | 0 | [10]
(South Korea) J-s Nam (South Korea) M-k Song | 3 | 6 | [6]
