= 2016 Chengdu Challenger =

- Date: 1–7 August
- Edition: 1st
- Surface: Hard
- Location: Chengdu, China

Champions

Singles
- (Chinese Taipei) Jason Jung

Doubles
- (China) Gong Maoxin / (China) Zhang Ze
Chengdu Challenger	· 2017 →

The 2016 Chengdu Challenger was a professional tennis tournament played on hard courts. It was the 1st edition of the tournament which was part of the 2016 ATP Challenger Tour. It took place in Chengdu, China between 1 and 7 August 2016.

== Singles main-draw entrants ==
=== Seeds ===
Country	Player	Rank^{1}	Seed
RUS	Konstantin Kravchuk	103	1
JPN	Go Soeda	127	2
RUS	Alexander Kudryavtsev	166	3
CHN	Wu Di	173	4
CHN	Zhang Ze	181	5
ESP	Enrique López Pérez	188	6
KOR	Lee Duck-hee	194	7
ESP	Pere Riba	197	8

- ^{1} Rankings are as of July 25, 2016.

=== Other entrants ===
The following players received wildcards into the singles main draw:

- (China) Te Rigele
- (China) Ouyang Bowen
- (China) He Yecong
- (Serbia) Janko Tipsarević

The following player received entry into the singles main draw with a protected ranking:

- (India) Karunuday Singh

The following players received entry from the qualifying draw:

- (China) Sun Fajing
- (Japan) Takuto Niki
- (Japan) Yuya Kibi
- (Russia) Evgeny Karlovskiy

== Champions ==
=== Singles ===
- (Chinese Taipei) Jason Jung def. (Spain) Rubén Ramírez Hidalgo, 6–4, 6–2

=== Doubles ===
- (China) Gong Maoxin / (China) Zhang Ze def. (China) Gao Xin / (China) Li Zhe, 6–3, 4–6, [13–11]
