= 2019 Chengdu Challenger – Singles =

Singles
- 2019 Chengdu Challenger

Final
- Champion: (South Korea) Chung Hyeon
- Runner-up: (Japan) Yūichi Sugita
- Score: 6–4, 6–3

Events
Singles	Doubles
- Chengdu Challenger

Zhang Ze was the defending champion but lost in the third round to Bai Yan.

Chung Hyeon won the title after defeating Yūichi Sugita 6–4, 6–3 in the final.

== Seeds ==
All seeds receive a bye into the second round.

1. (Australia) James Duckworth (quarterfinals)
2. (South Korea) Chung Hyeon (champion)
3. (Japan) Tatsuma Ito (semifinals)
4. (China) Zhang Ze (third round)
5. (South Korea) Chung Yun-seong (second round)
6. (Japan) Yūichi Sugita (final)
7. (Portugal) Gonçalo Oliveira (third round)
8. (India) Saketh Myneni (third round)
9. (Chinese Taipei) Wu Tung-lin (second round)
10. (South Korea) Nam Ji-sung (quarterfinals)
11. (China) Zhang Zhizhen (quarterfinals)
12. (Chinese Taipei) Yang Tsung-hua (second round)
13. (United Kingdom) Brydan Klein (second round, retired)
14. (China) Wu Di (third round)
15. (China) Xia Zihao (second round)
16. (China) Bai Yan (semifinals)

== Draw ==
Key

- Q = Qualifier
- WC = Wild card
- LL = Lucky loser
- Alt = Alternate
- ITF = ITF entry
- PR = Protected ranking
- SR = Special ranking
- SE = Special exempt
- JE = Junior exempt
- JR = Junior Accelerator Programme entrant
- CO = College Accelerator Programme entrant
- NG = Next Gen Accelerator Program entrant
- w/o = Walkover
- r = Retired
- d = Defaulted

=== Finals ===
Quarterfinals
1	(Australia) James Duckworth	6	6^{5}	4
6	(Japan) Yūichi Sugita	3	7^{7}	6
16	(China) Bai Yan	2	7^{7}	6
11	(China) Zhang Zhizhen	6	6^{1}	4
(Japan) Shuichi Sekiguchi	2	1
3	(Japan) Tatsuma Ito	6	6
10	(South Korea) Nam Ji-sung	6^{2}	6	3
2	(South Korea) Chung Hyeon	7^{7}	1	6

Semifinals
6	(Japan) Yūichi Sugita	6	6
16	(China) Bai Yan	1	3
3	(Japan) Tatsuma Ito	2	6^{4}
2	(South Korea) Chung Hyeon	6	7^{7}

Final
6	(Japan) Yūichi Sugita	4	3
2	(South Korea) Chung Hyeon	6	6

=== Top half ===
==== Section 1 ====
First round
(China) R Hua	6	6
ITF	(Ukraine) V Orlov	4	3
ITF	(United States) E Zhu	3	3
(Australia) T Fancutt	6	6
(Finland) H Heliövaara	6	6
ITF	(Zimbabwe) CJ Lock	3	2
(China) J Cui	6	6
(United States) A Ayeni	2	1

Second round
1	(Australia) J Duckworth	6^{5}	7^{7}	6
(China) R Hua	7^{7}	6^{4}	3
(Australia) T Fancutt	7^{7}	6
15	(China) Xia Zihao	6^{1}	4
9	(Chinese Taipei) T-l Wu	6	6^{5}	2
(Finland) H Heliövaara	3	7^{7}	6
(China) J Cui	1	4
6	(Japan) Y Sugita	6	6

Third round
1	(Australia) J Duckworth	6	6
(Australia) T Fancutt	2	2
(Finland) H Heliövaara	6^{2}	0^{r}
6	(Japan) Y Sugita	7^{7}	0

Quarterfinals
1	(Australia) J Duckworth	6	6^{5}	4
6	(Japan) Y Sugita	3	7^{7}	6

==== Section 2 ====
First round
(Monaco) L Catarina	6	6
WC	(China) Li Wenmao	1	2
ITF	(Japan) Issei Okamura	1	2
(Japan) Y Takahashi	6	6
(Australia) H Bourchier	6	6
(Zimbabwe) B Lock	2	2
(India) Manish Sureshkumar	6^{5}	4
Q	(Japan) T Matsui	7^{7}	6

Second round
4	(China) Ze Zhang	6	4	6
(Monaco) L Catarina	3	6	2
(Japan) Y Takahashi	4	2
16	(China) Y Bai	6	6
11	(China) Zh Zhang	7^{7}	2	7
(Australia) H Bourchier	6^{5}	6	5
Q	(Japan) T Matsui	3	0^{r}
8	(India) S Myneni	6	0

Third round
4	(China) Ze Zhang	6^{3}	7^{8}	3
16	(China) Y Bai	7^{7}	6^{6}	6
11	(China) Zh Zhang	6^{4}	7	7^{7}
8	(India) S Myneni	7^{7}	5	6^{4}

Quarterfinals
16	(China) Y Bai	2	7^{7}	6
11	(China) Zh Zhang	6	6^{1}	4

=== Bottom half ===
==== Section 3 ====
First round
(Australia) B Ellis	6	3	6^{4}
(India) A Kadhe	1	6	7^{7}
WC	(China) Zheng Wei Qiang	5	1
(Japan) Shuichi Sekiguchi	7	6
(Australia) M Romios	7^{9}	6
(India) Sidharth Rawat	6^{7}	4
WC	(China) Wang Chukang	6	0	0^{r}
(Japan) Makoto Ochi	3	6	4

Second round
7	(Portugal) G Oliveira	7^{7}	6
(India) A Kadhe	6^{4}	3
(Japan) S Sekiguchi	6	6
12	(Chinese Taipei) T-h Yang	4	4
13	(United Kingdom) B Klein	7	6^{5}	2^{r}
(Australia) M Romios	5	7^{7}	4
(Japan) M Ochi	4	3
3	(Japan) T Ito	6	6

Third round
7	(Portugal) G Oliveira	4	6	4
(Japan) S Sekiguchi	6	3	6
(Australia) M Romios	2	1
3	(Japan) T Ito	6	6

Quarterfinals
(Japan) S Sekiguchi	2	1
3	(Japan) T Ito	6	6

==== Section 4 ====
First round
(Australia) D Kelly	7^{7}	7^{7}
(Thailand) W Trongcharoenchaikul	6^{2}	6^{4}
Q	(China) M Gong	3	7^{11}	7^{7}
(South Korea) M-k Song	6	6^{9}	6^{2}
WC	(China) Chuh Wang	7	6
(France) Laurent Rochette	5	2
WC	(China) Liu Hanyi	4	7^{8}	3
ITF	(Japan) K Takeuchi	6	6^{6}	6

Second round
5	(South Korea) Y-s Chung	3	6	2
(Australia) D Kelly	6	4	6
Q	(China) M Gong	6^{2}	1
10	(South Korea) J-s Nam	7^{7}	6
14	(China) D Wu	6	6
WC	(China) Chuh Wang	3	3
ITF	(Japan) K Takeuchi	3	2
2	(South Korea) Hy Chung	6	6

Third round
(Australia) D Kelly	6^{1}	3
10	(South Korea) J-s Nam	7^{7}	6
14	(China) D Wu	6^{4}	7^{8}	3
2	(South Korea) Hy Chung	7^{7}	6^{6}	6

Quarterfinals
10	(South Korea) J-s Nam	6^{2}	6	3
2	(South Korea) Hy Chung	7^{7}	1	6
