= Oscar Otte =

German tennis player

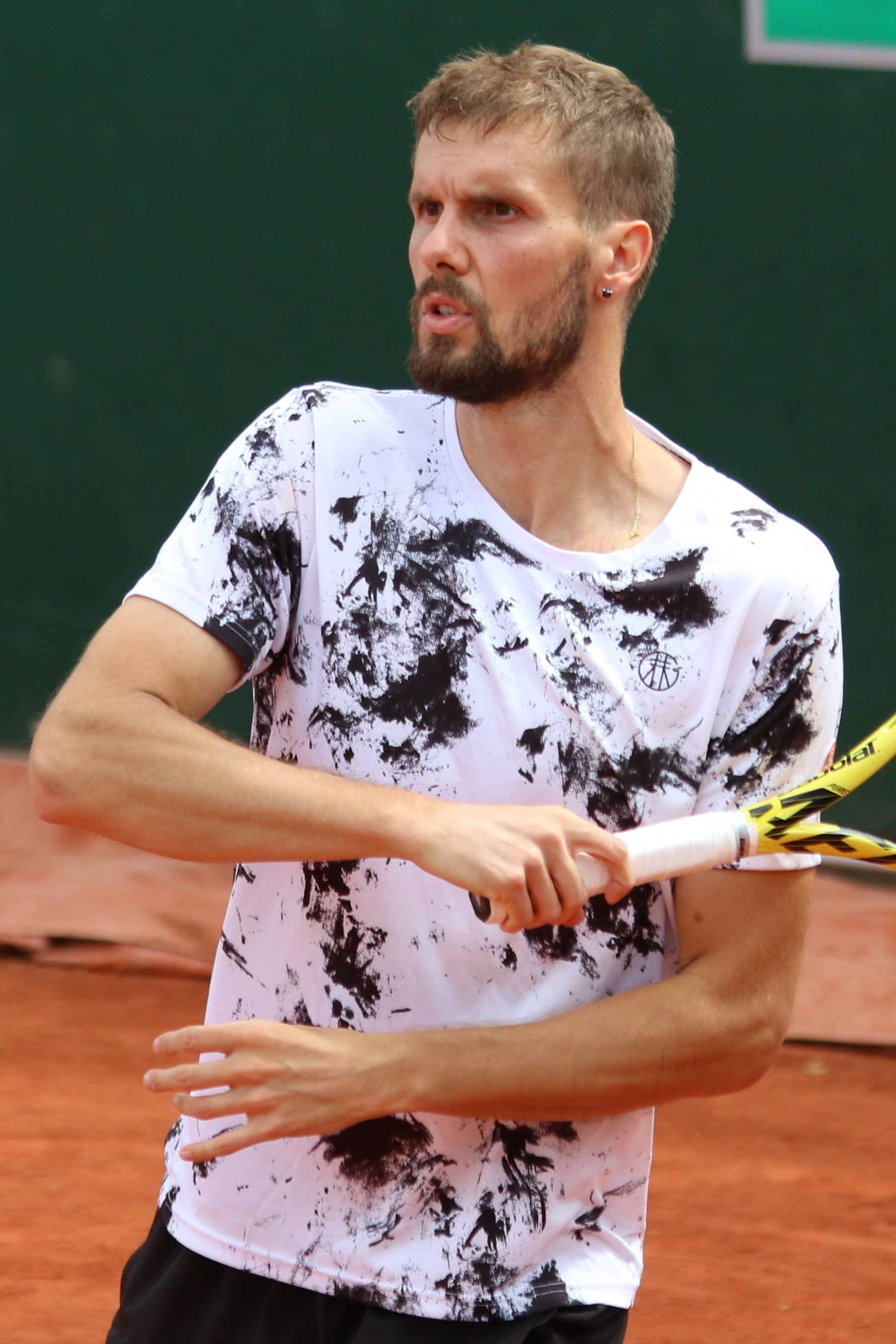
- Otte at the 2022 French Open
- Country (sports): Germany
- Residence: Cologne, Germany
- Born: 16 July 1993 (age 33) Cologne
- Height: 1.93 m (6 ft 4 in)
- Turned pro: 2011
- Plays: Right-handed (two-handed backhand)
- Coach: Peter Moraing
- Prize money: US $2,517,153

Singles
- Career record: 33–52
- Career titles: 0
- Highest ranking: No. 36 (27 June 2022)

Grand Slam singles results
- Australian Open: 2R (2022)
- French Open: 2R (2019)
- Wimbledon: 3R (2022)
- US Open: 4R (2021)

Doubles
- Career record: 9–15
- Career titles: 0
- Highest ranking: No. 161 (15 May 2017)

Grand Slam doubles results
- French Open: 1R (2022)
- Wimbledon: 1R (2022)

Team competitions
- Davis Cup: QF (2022)

Oscar Otte (German pronunciation: [ˈɔskaʁ ˈʔɔtə]; born 16 July 1993) is a German inactive professional tennis player. He has been ranked as high as world No. 36 in singles by the Association of Tennis Professionals (ATP), which he achieved on 27 June 2022, and has a career-high doubles ranking of world No. 161, attained in May 2017.

Since turning professional in 2011, Otte has won 23 singles and doubles titles on the ITF World Tennis Tour and seven on the ATP Challenger Tour. After several years of failing to qualify for most Grand Slam tournaments, he produced consistency in 2021 by entering into three consecutive main draws and showed his best performance at a major at the 2021 US Open, where he upset 20th seed Lorenzo Sonego in the first round and ultimately reached the fourth round. In January 2022, he made his top 100 debut in the singles rankings and emerged into the top 50 five months later, following his first career ATP 500 semifinal at the 2022 Halle Open.

== Tennis career ==
=== 2017: First Challenger title ===
Otte made a remarkable run at the Qingdao Challenger, where he reached the final both in the singles (as a qualifier) and in the doubles tournament.

He won his first ATP Challenger Tour doubles title at the Garden Open in Rome, partnering Andreas Mies. A few weeks later, he won his first Challenger singles title in Lisbon.

=== 2018–2020: Grand Slam debut, Challenger tour success ===
Otte made his Grand Slam main draw debut at the 2018 French Open as a lucky loser but despite winning the opening set he lost in the first round to Matteo Berrettini.

He won his first singles match on the ATP Tour at the Stockholm Open, defeating Jürgen Zopp in the first round.

Otte qualified again for the main draw at the 2019 French Open as a lucky loser and reached the second round by defeating Malek Jaziri. He lost in the second round to 3rd seed Roger Federer.

=== 2021: Three consecutive Major qualifications, US Open fourth round ===
Otte started his 2021 season at the Australian Open. He lost in the first round of qualifying to 12th seed Roman Safiullin.

Seeded fifth at the Play In Challenger, Otte lost in the first round to Giulio Zeppieri.

Otte qualified for the main draw at the French Open for the third time in his career. He lost to compatriot Alexander Zverev in the first round, despite winning the first two sets.

In June, Otte qualified for the Wimbledon main draw for the first time in his career. In the first round, Otte won only the second-ever fifth-set 12–12 singles tiebreak since that rule was implemented in 2019, defeating fellow qualifier Arthur Rinderknech 4–6, 6–3, 6–2, 6–7^{(5–7)}, 13–12^{(7–2)} in almost 4 hours over two days. In the second round, Otte was defeated by Andy Murray in a five-set match on Centre Court, 6–3, 4–6, 4–6, 6–4, 6–2.

Ranked No. 144, Otte saved match points in the first two rounds of the qualifying competition at the US Open before qualifying for his third-consecutive Grand Slam main draw in 2021. He reached the fourth round of a Grand Slam for the first time in his career, defeating 20th seed Lorenzo Sonego, Denis Kudla, and Andreas Seppi, before losing to sixth seed Matteo Berrettini. Otte was the third of a trio of qualifiers (alongside Peter Gojowczyk and Botic van de Zandschulp) who reached the fourth round of the US Open since the tournament began keeping qualifying records in 1982 and the lowest-ranked at this Major since No. 179 Jiří Novák in 2006. It also marked the first time since the 1995 French Open that three male qualifiers reached the second week of a Major.

=== 2022: Two ATP 250 and ATP 500 semifinals, top-20 wins, top 40 debut ===
Otte started his 2022 season at the Adelaide International 1. He lost in the final round of qualifying to Taro Daniel. At the Adelaide International 2, he was defeated in the first round of qualifying by Steve Johnson. Ranked 96 at the Australian Open, he recorded his first victory at this major by defeating wildcard Tseng Chun-hsin in the first round. He lost in the second round to 25th seed and world No. 26, Lorenzo Sonego.

In February, Otte competed at the first edition of the Dallas Open. He lost in the first round to American wildcard Jack Sock. At the Delray Beach Open, he was eliminated in the second round by top seed, world No. 13, and eventual champion, Cam Norrie. Getting past qualifying at the Mexican Open, he was beaten in the first round by eighth seed and world No. 17, Pablo Carreño Busta. In Indian Wells, he lost in the second round to 11th seed, Hubert Hurkacz, in three sets. At the Arizona Classic, he was defeated in the first round by Radu Albot. At the Miami Open, he was ousted from the tournament in the second round by 22nd seed and world No. 24, Gaël Monfils.

Otte started his clay-court season at the Monte-Carlo Masters. Entering the main draw as a lucky loser, he lost in the first round to qualifier Emil Ruusuvuori. At the Serbia Open, he upset fourth seed and last year finalist, Aslan Karatsev, in the second round. He lost in the quarterfinals to sixth seed Fabio Fognini. At his next tournament in Munich, he beat third seed and world No. 17, Reilly Opelka, in the second round to claim his first top-20 win. He defeated lucky loser, Alejandro Tabilo, in the quarterfinals to reach his first ATP Tour-level semifinal. He fell in his semifinal match to wildcard Holger Rune, who would end up winning the tournament. At the Lyon Open, he lost in the second round to seventh seed Sebastián Báez. Ranked 59 at the French Open, he lost in the first round to Roberto Carballés Baena in five sets.

Otte started his grass-court season at the BOSS Open in Stuttgart. He beat fourth seed and world No. 16, Denis Shapovalov, in the second round for his second top-20 win and biggest in his career thus far. He reached the semifinals of a tournament for the second time this season and lost to second seed and world No. 10, Matteo Berrettini, who would win the title. As a result of his Stuttgart run, Otte received a Special Exempt into the Halle Open. There on his debut, he defeated Miomir Kecmanović and Nikoloz Basilashvili to reach the quarterfinals of an ATP 500 tournament for the first time in his career. He then beat eighth seed and world No. 23, Karen Khachanov, to advance to his third consecutive semifinal on home soil. In the semifinals, he lost to top seed and eventual finalist, Daniil Medvedev. Due to a great result in Halle, his ranking improved from 51 to 36. At Wimbledon, he reached the third round for the first time in his career and lost to rising star, fifth seed, and world No. 7, Carlos Alcaraz.

After Wimbledon, Otte announced that he underwent an arthroscopy on the inner meniscus of his left knee. In August, he announced that he was fit and would be ready for New York. Ranked No. 41 at the US Open, he lost in the first round to eighth seed and world No. 10, Hubert Hurkacz.

Otte then represented Germany in the Davis Cup Group stage. Germany was in Group C alongside France, Belgium, and Australia. Against France, he lost to Adrian Mannarino. Against Belgium, he was defeated by David Goffin. Against Australia, he lost to Thanasi Kokkinakis. In the end, Germany defeated France 2–1, Belgium 2–1, and Australia 2–1 to qualify for the knockout stage.

Otte reached his first final on the ATP Tour in the doubles draw of the Sofia Open, partnering Fabian Fallert.

=== 2023–2025: Loss of form, out of top 500, hiatus ===
Otte received wildcards for the 2023 BOSS Open in Stuttgart and the 2023 Halle Open.

Otte qualified for the 2023 Wimbledon Championships and defeated compatriot Dominik Koepfer before losing to Daniel Elahi Galán in the second round. He injured his knee during the tournament and underwent surgery in August 2023. Ranked No. 474, Otte competed in his first tour-level event since having surgery at the 2024 Halle Open. He received a wildcard for the qualifying competition where he defeated fourth seed Jakub Menšík and sixth seed Constant Lestienne. In the main draw, he lost in the first round to second seed Alexander Zverev in three sets.

== Performance timelines ==
Key
W	F	SF	QF	#R	RR	Q#	DNQ	A	NH

(W) winner; (F) finalist; (SF) semifinalist; (QF) quarterfinalist; (#R) rounds 4, 3, 2, 1; (RR) round-robin stage; (Q#) qualification round; (DNQ) did not qualify; (A) absent; (NH) not held; (SR) strike rate (events won / competed); (W–L) win–loss record.
To avoid confusion and double counting, these charts are updated at the conclusion of a tournament or when the player's participation has ended.

=== Singles ===
Current through the 2025 ATP Tour.

Tournament	2017	2018	2019	2020	2021	2022	2023	2024	2025	SR	W–L	Win %
Grand Slam tournaments
Australian Open	A	Q1	Q3	Q1	Q1	2R	1R	A	A	0 / 2	1–2	33%
French Open	Q3	1R	2R	Q2	1R	1R	1R	A	A	0 / 5	1–5	17%
Wimbledon	Q1	Q1	Q2	NH	2R	3R	2R	A	A	0 / 3	4–3	57%
US Open	A	Q1	Q2	A	4R	1R	A	A	A	0 / 2	3–2	60%
Win–loss	0–0	0–1	1–1	0–0	4–3	3–4	1–3	0–0	0–0	0 / 12	9–12	43%
National representation
Davis Cup	A	A	A	A	A	QF	QR	A	A	0 / 1	0–5	0%
ATP Tour Masters 1000
Indian Wells Open	A	A	A	NH	A	2R	2R	A	A	0 / 2	2–2	50%
Miami Open	A	A	A	NH	A	2R	1R	A	A	0 / 2	1–2	33%
Monte-Carlo Masters	A	A	A	NH	A	1R	Q2	A	A	0 / 1	0–1	0%
Madrid Open	A	A	A	NH	A	A	2R	A	A	0 / 1	1–1	50%
Paris Masters	A	A	A	A	A	1R	A	A	A	0 / 1	0–1	0%
Win–loss	0–0	0–0	0–0	0–0	0–0	2–4	2–3	0–0	0–0	0 / 7	4–7	36%
Career statistics
	2017	2018	2019	2020	2021	2022	2023	2024	2025	Career		
Tournaments	0	2	3	2	4	22	12	1	0	Career total: 46		
Hard win–loss	0–0	1–1	0–2	2–2	3–1	6–18	3–8	0–0	0–0	0 / 26	15–32	32%
Clay win–loss	0–0	0–1	1–1	0–0	0–2	6–5	2–3	0–0	0–0	0 / 12	9–12	43%
Grass win–loss	0–0	0–0	0–0	0–0	1–1	7–3	1–3	0–1	0–0	0 / 8	9–8	53%
Overall win–loss	0–0	1–2	1–3	2–2	4–4	19–26	6–14	0–1	0–0	0 / 46	33–52	39%
Win %	–	33%	25%	50%	50%	42%	30%	0%	–	Career total: 39%		
Year-end ranking	131	167	163	140	101	76	252	737	1030			

=== Doubles ===
Tournament	2020	2021	2022	2023	SR	W–L
Grand Slam tournaments
Australian Open	A	A	A	A	0 / 0	0–0
French Open	A	A	1R	A	0 / 1	0–1
Wimbledon	NH	A	1R	A	0 / 1	0–1
US Open	A	A	A	A	0 / 0	0–0
Win–loss	0–0	0–0	0–2	0–0	0 / 2	0–2
Career statistics
Tournaments	1	0	10	4	15	
Titles	0	0	0	0	0	
Finals	0	0	1	0	1	
Overall win–loss	0–1	0–0	6–10	3–4	9–15	
Year-end ranking	782	649	226	277	38%	

== ATP career finals ==
=== Doubles: 1 (1 runner-up) ===
Legend Grand Slam (–) ATP 1000 (–) ATP 500 (–) ATP 250 (0–1)	Finals by surface Hard (0–1) Clay (–) Grass (–)

Result	W–L	Date	Tournament	Tier	Surface	Partner	Opponents	Score
Loss	0–1	Sep 2022	Sofia Open, Bulgaria	ATP 250	Hard (i)	(Germany) Fabian Fallert	(Brazil) Rafael Matos (Spain) David Vega Hernández	6–3, 5–7, [8–10]

== ATP Challenger finals ==
=== Singles: 11 (5–6) ===
Finals by surface
Hard (2–2)
Clay (2–3)
Grass (0–1)
Carpet (1–0)

Result	W–L	Date	Tournament	Surface	Opponent	Score
Loss	0–1	Apr 2017	Qingdao, China	Clay	(Serbia) Janko Tipsarević	3–6, 6–7^{(9–11)}
Win	1–1	Jun 2017	Lisbon, Portugal	Clay	(Japan) Taro Daniel	4–6, 6–1, 6–3
Loss	1–2	Jun 2018	Ilkley, Great Britain	Grass	(Ukraine) Sergiy Stakhovsky	4–6, 4–6
Loss	1–3	Mar 2019	Yokohama, Japan	Hard	(South Korea) Kwon Soon-woo	6–7^{(4–7)}, 3–6
Loss	1–4	Apr 2019	Francavilla, Italy	Hard	(Italy) Stefano Travaglia	3–6, 7–6^{(7–3)}, 3–6
Loss	1–5	Sep 2020	Ostrava, Czech Republic	Clay	(Russia) Aslan Karatsev	4–6, 2–6
Win	2–5	Sep 2020	Aix-en-Provence, France	Clay	(Brazil) Thiago Seyboth Wild	6–2, 6–7^{(4–7)}, 6–4
Loss	2–6	May 2021	Prague, Czech Republic	Clay	(Netherlands) Tallon Griekspoor	7–5, 4–6, 4–6
Win	3–6	Oct 2021	Ismaning, Germany	Carpet	(Slovakia) Lukáš Lacko	6–4, 6-4
Win	4–6	Nov 2021	Ortisei, Italy	Hard (i)	(United States) Maxime Cressy	7–6^{(7–5)}, 6–4
Win	5–6	Nov 2021	Bari, Italy	Hard	(Germany) Daniel Masur	7–5, 7–5

=== Doubles: 4 (2–2) ===
Finals by surface
Hard (0–1)
Clay (2–1)

Result	W–L	Date	Tournament	Surface	Partner	Opponents	Score
Loss	0–1	Apr 2017	Qingdao, China	Clay	(Germany) Andreas Mies	(Germany) Gero Kretschmer (Germany) Alexander Satschko	6–2, 6–7^{(6–8)}, [3–10]
Win	1–1	May 2017	Rome, Italy	Clay	(Germany) Andreas Mies	(Belgium) Kimmer Coppejans (Hungary) Márton Fucsovics	4–6, 7–6^{(14–12)}, [10–8]
Win	2–1	April 2021	Oeiras, Portugal	Clay	(Germany) Mats Moraing	(Italy) Riccardo Bonadio (Kazakhstan) Denis Yevseyev	6–1, 6–4
Loss	2–2	Mar 2022	Phoenix, United States	Hard	(Germany) Jan-Lennard Struff	(Philippines) Treat Huey (United States) Denis Kudla	6–7^{(10–12)}, 6–3, [6–10]

== ITF Futures finals ==
=== Singles: 12 (8–4) ===
Finals by surface
Hard (3–1)
Clay (5–1)
Carpet (0–2)

Result	W–L	Date	Tournament	Surface	Opponent	Score
Win	1–0	Jul 2013	Germany F11, Dortmund	Clay	(Germany) Ivo Mijic	6–1, 6–4
Loss	1–1	Sep 2013	France F17, Forbach	Carpet (i)	(Germany) Tim Pütz	2–6, 2–6
Loss	1–2	May 2015	Croatia F10, Bol	Clay	(Croatia) Toni Androić	6–4, 3–6, 3–6
Win	2–2	Jun 2015	Belgium F1, Binche	Clay	(Spain) Juan Lizariturry	7–5, 6–1
Win	3–2	Jun 2015	Belgium F2, Damme	Clay	(Germany) Tom Schönenberg	7–5, 6–3
Win	4–2	Aug 2015	Belgium F9, Eupen	Clay	(Belgium) Joris De Loore	4–6, 6–2, 6–3
Loss	4–3	Mar 2016	Portugal F2, Faro	Hard	(Netherlands) Jesse Huta Galung	6–1, 4–6, 2–6
Win	5–3	Aug 2016	Germany F12, Überlingen	Clay	(Bulgaria) Alexandar Lazov	6–7^{(4–7)}, 6–2, 6–4
Loss	5–4	Jan 2017	Germany F2, Kaarst	Carpet (i)	(Germany) Elmar Ejupovic	6–7^{(4–7)}, 7–6^{(7–3)}, 4–6
Win	6–4	Feb 2017	Great Britain F2, Tipton	Hard (i)	(France) David Guez	7–5, 6–3
Win	7–4	Feb 2017	Great Britain F3, Shrewsbury	Hard (i)	(United Kingdom) Marcus Willis	7–5, 7–6^{(7–4)}
Win	8–4	Mar 2017	France F6, Poitiers	Hard (i)	(France) Rémi Boutillier	6–4, 6–4

=== Doubles: 21 (15–6) ===
Finals by surface
Hard (5–1)
Clay (4–4)
Carpet (6–1)

Result	W–L	Date	Tournament	Surface	Partner	Opponents	Score
Win	1–0	Jul 2013	Germany F11, Dortmund	Clay	(Germany) Andreas Mies	(Germany) Mats Moraing (Germany) Tom Schönenberg	7–5, 6–1
Win	2–0	Sep 2013	France F17, Forbach	Carpet (i)	(Germany) Andreas Mies	(Germany) Tim Pütz (Germany) Lukas Storck	6–7^{(7–9)}, 6–2, [10–7]
Win	3–0	Oct 2013	Germany F17, Hambach	Carpet (i)	(Germany) Andreas Mies	(Austria) Nikolaus Moser (United Kingdom) Neil Pauffley	7–5, 4–4, ret.
Win	4–0	Oct 2013	Germany F19, Essen	Hard (i)	(Germany) Andreas Mies	(Serbia) Miki Janković (India) Sriram Balaji	w/o
Win	5–0	Oct 2013	Germany F20, Bad Salzdetfurth	Carpet (i)	(Germany) Andreas Mies	(Germany) Daniel Masur (Germany) Dominik Schulz	5–7, 6–3, [10–8]
Loss	5–1	Nov 2013	Greece F19, Heraklion	Hard	(Germany) Andreas Mies	(United Kingdom) Luke Bambridge (United Kingdom) Oliver Golding	3–6, 5–7
Loss	5–2	Jun 2014	Belgium F1, Damme	Clay	(Germany) Andreas Mies	(Germany) Florian Fallert (Germany) Nils Langer	5–7, 1–6
Loss	5–3	Jun 2014	Belgium F2, Binche	Clay	(Germany) Peter Torebko	(Belgium) Romain Barbosa (Portugal) Frederico Ferreira Silva	2–6, 6–7^{(4–7)}
Loss	5–4	Aug 2015	Netherlands F6, Rotterdam	Clay	(Germany) Matthias Wunner	(Netherlands) Wesley Koolhof (Netherlands) Matwé Middelkoop	3–6, 3–6
Loss	5–5	Jan 2016	Germany F1, Schwieberdingen	Carpet (i)	(Germany) Andreas Mies	(Switzerland) Antoine Bellier (France) Hugo Grenier	4–6, 6–7^{(7–9)}
Win	6–5	Mar 2016	Portugal F3, Loulé	Hard	(Germany) Andreas Mies	(Portugal) João Domingues (Portugal) Nuno Deus	5–0 ret.
Win	7–5	Mar 2016	France F7, Villers-lès-Nancy	Hard (i)	(Germany) Andreas Mies	(Canada) Martin Beran (United Kingdom) Evan Hoyt	4–6, 6–4, [10–7]
Win	8–5	Apr 2016	Spain F7, Madrid	Hard	(Germany) Andreas Mies	(Romania) Patrick Grigoriu (Romania) Luca George Tatomir	2–6, 6–1, [10–3]
Win	9–5	May 2016	Czech Republic F2, Prague	Clay	(Germany) Andreas Mies	(Czech Republic) Zdeněk Kolář (Czech Republic) Petr Michnev	6–0, 6–4
Win	10–5	May 2016	Romania F4, Bacău	Clay	(Germany) Andreas Mies	(Colombia) Nicolás Barrientos (Ecuador) Emilio Gómez	6–3, 6–3
Win	11–5	Aug 2016	Germany F12, Überlingen	Clay	(Germany) Tom Schönenberg	(Peru) Mauricio Echazú (Bulgaria) Alexandar Lazov	6–1, 6–0
Loss	11–6	Sep 2016	Belgium F14, Damme	Clay	(Germany) Tom Schönenberg	(Germany) Daniel Altmaier (Germany) Marvin Netuschil	2–6, 0–6
Win	12–6	Oct 2016	Germany F16, Bad Salzdetfurth	Carpet (i)	(Germany) Andreas Mies	(Germany) Marvin Möller (Germany) Tim Rühl	6–7^{(3–7)}, 6–4, [10–7]
Win	13–6	Jan 2017	Germany F2, Kaarst	Carpet (i)	(Germany) Jannis Kahlke	(Netherlands) David Pel (Belgium) Joran Vliegen	6–3, 5–7, [10–8]
Win	14–6	Jan 2017	Germany F3, Nußloch	Carpet (i)	(Germany) Andreas Mies	(Poland) Mateusz Kowalczyk (Poland) Grzegorz Panfil	6–3, 6–0
Win	15–6	Feb 2017	Great Britain F2, Tipton	Hard (i)	(Germany) Jannis Kahlke	(Italy) Andrea Pellegrino (Italy) Andrea Vavassori	5–7, 6–2, [10–5]
