= 2017 Chengdu Challenger – Doubles =

Doubles
- 2017 Chengdu Challenger

Final
- Champions: (India) Sriram Balaji (India) Vishnu Vardhan
- Runners-up: (Chinese Taipei) Hsieh Cheng-peng (Chinese Taipei) Peng Hsien-yin
- Score: 6–3, 6–4

Events
Singles	Doubles
- Chengdu Challenger

Gong Maoxin and Zhang Ze were the defending champions but chose not to defend their title.

Sriram Balaji and Vishnu Vardhan won the title after defeating Hsieh Cheng-peng and Peng Hsien-yin 6–3, 6–4 in the final.

== Seeds ==
1. (Chinese Taipei) Hsieh Cheng-peng / (Chinese Taipei) Peng Hsien-yin (final)
2. (India) Sriram Balaji / (India) Vishnu Vardhan (champions)
3. (Chinese Taipei) Chen Ti / (Chinese Taipei) Yi Chu-huan (first round)
4. (Belarus) Sergey Betov / (Russia) Alexander Kudryavtsev (first round)

== Draw ==
Key

- Q = Qualifier
- WC = Wild card
- LL = Lucky loser
- Alt = Alternate
- ITF = ITF entry
- PR = Protected ranking
- SR = Special ranking
- SE = Special exempt
- JE = Junior exempt
- JR = Junior Accelerator Programme entrant
- CO = College Accelerator Programme entrant
- NG = Next Gen Accelerator Program entrant
- w/o = Walkover
- r = Retired
- d = Defaulted

First round
1	(Chinese Taipei) C-p Hsieh (Chinese Taipei) H-y Peng	7	6
PR	(Australia) D Kelly (United Kingdom) J Ward	5	4
(Japan) T Niki (China) F Sun	6^{3}	6	[4]
(China) D Wu (China) Zh Zhang	7^{7}	3	[10]
4	(Belarus) S Betov (Russia) A Kudryavtsev	4	3
WC	(China) Y He (China) Y Wu	6	6
(China) X Gao (China) Z Li	6^{5}	6	[5]
WC	(China) Feng He (China) Zhong Su-hao	7^{7}	2	[10]
WC	(China) Li Wenmao (China) Li Yang-xuan	1	2
(South Korea) Kim Cheong-eui (South Korea) S-w Kwon	6	6
(Japan) T Matsui (Serbia) N Milojević	6	3	[10]
3	(Chinese Taipei) T Chen (Chinese Taipei) C-h Yi	4	6	[6]
(Republic of Ireland) S Barry (Spain) M Vilella Martínez	3	1
(Japan) Yuya Kibi (Japan) Shuichi Sekiguchi	6	6
(Japan) Y Takahashi (Japan) K Takeuchi	2	3
2	(India) S Balaji (India) V Vardhan	6	6

Quarterfinals
1	(Chinese Taipei) C-p Hsieh (Chinese Taipei) H-y Peng	6	6
(China) D Wu (China) Zh Zhang	4	4
WC	(China) Y He (China) Y Wu	4	6	[5]
WC	(China) H Feng (China) S-h Zhong	6	3	[10]
(South Korea) C-e Kim (South Korea) S-w Kwon	7	7
(Japan) T Matsui (Serbia) N Milojević	5	5
(Japan) Y Kibi (Japan) S Sekiguchi	5	6^{1}
2	(India) S Balaji (India) V Vardhan	7	7^{7}

Semifinals
1	(Chinese Taipei) C-p Hsieh (Chinese Taipei) H-y Peng	6	6
WC	(China) H Feng (China) S-h Zhong	3	3
(South Korea) C-e Kim (South Korea) S-w Kwon	6^{2}	2
2	(India) S Balaji (India) V Vardhan	7^{7}	6

Final
1	(Chinese Taipei) C-p Hsieh (Chinese Taipei) H-y Peng	3	4
2	(India) S Balaji (India) V Vardhan	6	6
