= 2011 Monte-Carlo Rolex Masters – Singles qualifying =

This article displays the qualifying draw of the 2011 Monte-Carlo Rolex Masters.

== Players ==
=== Seeds ===
1. (Kazakhstan) Mikhail Kukushkin (first round)
2. (Germany) Philipp Petzschner (first round)
3. (Germany) Tobias Kamke (qualifying competition)
4. (Italy) Filippo Volandri (qualified)
5. (Belgium) Olivier Rochus (qualified)
6. (France) Julien Benneteau (qualified)
7. (Germany) Michael Berrer (first round)
8. (Portugal) Frederico Gil (qualified)
9. (Spain) Pere Riba (qualified)
10. (Argentina) Máximo González (qualified)
11. (Portugal) Rui Machado (first round)
12. (Germany) Mischa Zverev (first round)
13. (Spain) Rubén Ramírez Hidalgo (first round)
14. (Germany) Denis Gremelmayr (first round)

=== Qualifiers ===
1. (France) Vincent Millot
2. (Portugal) Frederico Gil
3. (Spain) Pere Riba
4. (Italy) Filippo Volandri
5. (Belgium) Olivier Rochus
6. (France) Julien Benneteau
7. (Argentina) Máximo González

== Qualifying draw ==
=== First qualifier ===
First round
1 | (Kazakhstan) Mikhail Kukushkin | 3 | 3
(Italy) Simone Bolelli | 6 | 6
(France) Vincent Millot | 6 | 2
12 | (Germany) Mischa Zverev | 2 | 0^{r}

Qualifying competition
(Italy) Simone Bolelli | 2 | 1
(France) Vincent Millot | 6 | 6

=== Second qualifier ===
First round
2 | (Germany) Philipp Petzschner | 6^{4} | 1
(Italy) Flavio Cipolla | 7^{7} | 6
(Argentina) Federico del Bonis | 2 | 0
8 | (Portugal) Frederico Gil | 6 | 6

Qualifying competition
(Italy) Flavio Cipolla | 1 | 3
8 | (Portugal) Frederico Gil | 6 | 6

=== Third qualifier ===
First round
3 | (Germany) Tobias Kamke | 4 | 6 | 6
WC | (Monaco) Benjamin Balleret | 6 | 1 | 2
(France) David Guez | 7 | 4 | 2
9 | (Spain) Pere Riba | 6^{5} | 6 | 6

Qualifying competition
3 | (Germany) Tobias Kamke | 5 | 6 | 5
9 | (Spain) Pere Riba | 7 | 1 | 7

=== Fourth qualifier ===
First round
4 | (Italy) Filippo Volandri | 6 | 6
(Kazakhstan) Yuri Schukin | 3 | 1
(Australia) Peter Luczak | 7 | 6
14 | (Germany) Denis Gremelmayr | 5 | 1

Qualifying competition
4 | (Italy) Filippo Volandri | 6 | 6
(Australia) Peter Luczak | 4 | 1

=== Fifth qualifier ===
First round
5 | (Belgium) Olivier Rochus | 6 | 5 | 6
(France) Benoît Paire | 2 | 7 | 3
(France) Édouard Roger-Vasselin | 6 | 6
13 | (Spain) Rubén Ramírez Hidalgo | 2 | 2

Qualifying competition
5 | (Belgium) Olivier Rochus | 6 | 6
(France) Édouard Roger-Vasselin | 3 | 3

=== Sixth qualifier ===
First round
6 | (France) Julien Benneteau | 6 | 6
(Poland) Łukasz Kubot | 1 | 2
WC | (Australia) Bernard Tomic | 6 | 6^{7} | 6
11 | (Portugal) Rui Machado | 3 | 7^{9} | 4

Qualifying competition
6 | (France) Julien Benneteau | 6^{5} | 6 | 6
WC | (Australia) Bernard Tomic | 7^{7} | 4 | 3

=== Seventh qualifier ===
First round
7 | (Germany) Michael Berrer | 4 | 0
(Spain) Albert Ramos | 6 | 6
WC | (Monaco) Thomas Oger | 6^{1} | 3
10 | (Argentina) Máximo González | 7^{7} | 6

Qualifying competition
(Spain) Albert Ramos | 2 | 6 | 3
10 | (Argentina) Máximo González | 6 | 2 | 6
