= 2017 ZS-Sports China International Challenger =

- Date: 17–23 April
- Edition: 2nd
- Surface: Clay
- Location: Qingdao, China

Champions

Singles
- (Serbia) Janko Tipsarević

Doubles
- (Germany) Gero Kretschmer / (Germany) Alexander Satschko
← 2016 ·	ZS-Sports China International Challenger

The 2017 ZS-Sports China International Challenger was a professional tennis tournament played on clay courts. It was the 2nd edition of the tournament which was part of the 2017 ATP Challenger Tour. It took place in Qingdao, China between 17 and 23 April 2017.

== Singles main-draw entrants ==
=== Seeds ===
Country	Player	Rank^{1}	Seed
AUS	Jordan Thompson	78	1
SRB	Janko Tipsarević	90	2
ITA	Luca Vanni	122	3
SLO	Blaž Kavčič	128	4
FRA	Quentin Halys	137	5
FRA	Mathias Bourgue	151	6
SVK	Andrej Martin	153	7
RUS	Teymuraz Gabashvili	159	8

- ^{1} Rankings are as of April 10, 2017.

=== Other entrants ===
The following players received wildcards into the singles main draw:

- (China) Bai Yan
- (China) He Yecong
- (China) Sun Fajing
- (China) Wang Aoxiong

The following player received entry into the singles main draw using a protected ranking:

- (Spain) Daniel Muñoz de la Nava

The following players received entry from the qualifying draw:

- (Canada) Félix Auger-Aliassime
- (Ukraine) Denys Molchanov
- (Germany) Oscar Otte
- (Germany) Peter Torebko

== Champions ==
=== Singles ===
- (Serbia) Janko Tipsarević def. (Germany) Oscar Otte 6–3, 7–6^{(11–9)}.

=== Doubles ===
- (Germany) Gero Kretschmer / (Germany) Alexander Satschko def. (Germany) Andreas Mies / (Germany) Oscar Otte 2–6, 7–6^{(8–6)}, [10–3].
