= 2011 Mutua Madrid Open – Men's singles qualifying =

This article displays the qualifying draw of the 2011 Mutua Madrid Open.

== Players ==
=== Seeds ===
1. (Italy) Fabio Fognini (first round)
2. (France) Adrian Mannarino (qualified)
3. (Spain) Daniel Gimeno-Traver (qualified)
4. (Romania) Victor Hănescu (qualified)
5. (Argentina) Carlos Berlocq (first round)
6. (Belgium) Olivier Rochus (qualifying competition, lucky loser)
7. (Spain) Pere Riba (qualified)
8. (Russia) Teymuraz Gabashvili (first round)
9. (Netherlands) Thiemo de Bakker (qualified)
10. (Russia) Igor Kunitsyn (first round)
11. (France) Nicolas Mahut (first round)
12. (Austria) Andreas Haider-Maurer (first round)
13. (Russia) Igor Andreev (qualifying competition)
14. (Spain) Rubén Ramírez Hidalgo (qualifying competition)

=== Qualifiers ===
1. (Colombia) Alejandro Falla
2. (France) Adrian Mannarino
3. (Spain) Daniel Gimeno-Traver
4. (Romania) Victor Hănescu
5. (Netherlands) Thiemo de Bakker
6. (Italy) Flavio Cipolla
7. (Spain) Pere Riba

=== Lucky losers ===
1. (Belgium) Olivier Rochus

== Qualifying draw ==
=== First qualifier ===
First round
1	(Italy) Fabio Fognini	6	6^{4}	2
(Argentina) Federico del Bonis	3	7	6
(Colombia) Alejandro Falla	6	6
11	(France) Nicolas Mahut	4	4

Qualifying competition
(Argentina) Federico del Bonis	1	2
(Colombia) Alejandro Falla	6	6

=== Second qualifier ===
First round
2	(France) Adrian Mannarino	6	6
WC	(Spain) Roberto Ortega-Olmedo	1	2
(Spain) Daniel Muñoz-de la Nava	6	6
10	(Russia) Igor Kunitsyn	4	4

Qualifying competition
2	(France) Adrian Mannarino	6	7
(Spain) Daniel Muñoz-de la Nava	2	6^{5}

=== Third qualifier ===
First round
3	(Spain) Daniel Gimeno-Traver	7	7
(Turkey) Marsel İlhan	6^{2}	5
WC	(Spain) Javier Martí	0	7	4
14	(Spain) Rubén Ramírez Hidalgo	6	6^{5}	6

Qualifying competition
3	(Spain) Daniel Gimeno-Traver	7	6
14	(Spain) Rubén Ramírez Hidalgo	5	2

=== Fourth qualifier ===
First round
4	(Romania) Victor Hănescu	6	6
(Spain) Albert Ramos	3	2
WC	(Romania) Marius Copil	7	6
12	(Austria) Andreas Haider-Maurer	6^{0}	1

Qualifying competition
4	(Romania) Victor Hănescu	5	7	7
WC	(Romania) Marius Copil	7	5	6^{6}

=== Fifth qualifier ===
First round
5	(Argentina) Carlos Berlocq	1	7	2
(Poland) Łukasz Kubot	6	6^{2}	6
Alt	(Spain) Roberto Bautista-Agut	6^{6}	7	3
9	(Netherlands) Thiemo de Bakker	7	6^{7}	6

Qualifying competition
(Poland) Łukasz Kubot	6	4	2
9	(Netherlands) Thiemo de Bakker	2	6	6

=== Sixth qualifier ===
First round
6	(Belgium) Olivier Rochus	2	7	7
Alt	(Brazil) João Souza	6	6^{5}	6^{3}
(Italy) Flavio Cipolla	6	7
8	(Russia) Teymuraz Gabashvili	2	5

Qualifying competition
6	(Belgium) Olivier Rochus	4	6	4
(Italy) Flavio Cipolla	6	1	6

=== Seventh qualifier ===
First round
7	(Spain) Pere Riba	6	6
(Ukraine) Illya Marchenko	2	4
WC	(Spain) Albert Alcaraz Ivorra	1	1
13	(Russia) Igor Andreev	6	6

Qualifying competition
7	(Spain) Pere Riba	6	6
13	(Russia) Igor Andreev	3	2
