= 2019 Chengdu Challenger =

Pro hard court tennis

- Date: 29 July – 4 August
- Edition: 4th
- Surface: Hard
- Location: Chengdu, China

Champions

Singles
- (South Korea) Chung Hyeon

Doubles
- (India) Arjun Kadhe / (India) Saketh Myneni
- Chengdu Challenger

The 2019 Chengdu Challenger was a professional tennis tournament played on hard courts. It was the 4th edition of the tournament which was part of the 2019 ATP Challenger Tour. It took place in Chengdu, China between 29 July and 4 August 2019.

== Singles main-draw entrants ==
=== Seeds ===
Country	Player	Rank^{1}	Seed
AUS	James Duckworth	145	1
KOR	Chung Hyeon	154	2
JPN	Tatsuma Ito	157	3
CHN	Zhang Ze	216	4
KOR	Chung Yun-seong	233	5
JPN	Yūichi Sugita	241	6
POR	Gonçalo Oliveira	252	7
IND	Saketh Myneni	264	8
TPE	Wu Tung-lin	284	9
KOR	Nam Ji-sung	291	10
CHN	Zhang Zhizhen	300	11
TPE	Yang Tsung-hua	301	12
GBR	Brydan Klein	346	13
CHN	Wu Di	353	14
CHN	Xia Zihao	361	15
CHN	Bai Yan	368	16

- ^{1} Rankings are as of 22 July 2019.

=== Other entrants ===
The following players received wildcards into the singles main draw:

- (China) Li Wenmao
- (China) Liu Hanyi
- (China) Wang Chuhan
- (China) Wang Chukang
- (China) Zheng Wei Qiang

The following players received entry into the singles main draw using their ITF World Tennis Ranking:

- (Zimbabwe) Courtney John Lock
- (Japan) Issei Okamura
- (Ukraine) Vladyslav Orlov
- (Japan) Kento Takeuchi
- (United States) Evan Zhu

The following players received entry from the qualifying draw:

- (China) Gong Maoxin
- (Japan) Toshihide Matsui

== Champions ==
=== Singles ===
- (South Korea) Chung Hyeon def. (Japan) Yūichi Sugita 6–4, 6–3

=== Doubles ===
- (India) Arjun Kadhe / (India) Saketh Myneni def. (South Korea) Nam Ji-sung / (South Korea) Song Min-kyu 6–3, 0–6, [10–6].
