= 2017 Chengdu Challenger =

- Date: 31 July – 6 August
- Edition: 2nd
- Surface: Hard
- Location: Chengdu, China

Champions

Singles
- (Chinese Taipei) Lu Yen-hsun

Doubles
- (India) Sriram Balaji / (India) Vishnu Vardhan
| ← 2016 · | Chengdu Challenger | · 2018 → |

The 2017 Chengdu Challenger was a professional tennis tournament played on hard courts. It was the 2nd edition of the tournament which was part of the 2017 ATP Challenger Tour. It took place in Chengdu, China between 31 July and 6 August 2017.

== Singles main-draw entrants ==
=== Seeds ===
| Country | Player | Rank^{1} | Seed |
|---|---|---|---|
| TPE | Lu Yen-hsun | 77 | 1 |
| RUS | Evgeny Donskoy | 98 | 2 |
| KOR | Lee Duck-hee | 149 | 3 |
| SRB | Nikola Milojević | 177 | 4 |
| LTU | Ričardas Berankis | 190 | 5 |
| KOR | Kwon Soon-woo | 202 | 6 |
| JPN | Hiroki Moriya | 211 | 7 |
| CHN | Wu Di | 222 | 8 |

- ^{1} Rankings are as of July 24, 2017.

=== Other entrants ===
The following players received wildcards into the singles main draw:

- (China) Gao Xin
- (China) Sun Fajing
- (China) Wu Yibing
- (China) Zhang Zhizhen

The following players received entry into the singles main draw using a protected ranking:

- (Uzbekistan) Farrukh Dustov
- (United Kingdom) James Ward

The following players received entry from the qualifying draw:

- (South Korea) Chung Yun-seong
- (China) He Yecong
- (India) Sidharth Rawat
- (Japan) Kento Takeuchi

== Champions ==
=== Singles ===
- (Chinese Taipei) Lu Yen-hsun def. (Russia) Evgeny Donskoy 6–3, 6–4.

=== Doubles ===
- (India) Sriram Balaji / (India) Vishnu Vardhan def. (Chinese Taipei) Hsieh Cheng-peng / (Chinese Taipei) Peng Hsien-yin 6–3, 6–4.
