= 2017 Chengdu Challenger – Singles =

Singles
- 2017 Chengdu Challenger

Final
- Champion: (Chinese Taipei) Lu Yen-hsun
- Runner-up: (Russia) Evgeny Donskoy
- Score: 6–3, 6–4

Events
Singles	Doubles
- Chengdu Challenger

Jason Jung was the defending champion but chose not to defend his title.

Lu Yen-hsun won the title after defeating Evgeny Donskoy 6–3, 6–4 in the final.

== Seeds ==
1. (Chinese Taipei) Lu Yen-hsun (champion)
2. (Russia) Evgeny Donskoy (final)
3. (South Korea) Lee Duck-hee (first round)
4. (Serbia) Nikola Milojević (semifinals)
5. (Lithuania) Ričardas Berankis (first round)
6. (South Korea) Kwon Soon-woo (first round)
7. (Japan) Hiroki Moriya (second round)
8. (China) Wu Di (second round)

== Draw ==
Key

- Q = Qualifier
- WC = Wild card
- LL = Lucky loser
- Alt = Alternate
- ITF = ITF entry
- PR = Protected ranking
- SR = Special ranking
- SE = Special exempt
- JE = Junior exempt
- JR = Junior Accelerator Programme entrant
- CO = College Accelerator Programme entrant
- NG = Next Gen Accelerator Program entrant
- w/o = Walkover
- r = Retired
- d = Defaulted

=== Finals ===
Semifinals
1	(Chinese Taipei) Lu Yen-hsun	6	3	6
WC	(China) Wu Yibing	1	6	4
4	(Serbia) Nikola Milojević	6^{6}	3
2	(Russia) Evgeny Donskoy	7^{8}	6

Final
1	(Chinese Taipei) Lu Yen-hsun	6	6
2	(Russia) Evgeny Donskoy	3	4

=== Top half ===
First round
1	(Chinese Taipei) Y-h Lu	6^{2}	6	6
(Spain) M Vilella Martínez	7^{7}	3	0
PR	(Uzbekistan) F Dustov	2	4
Q	(China) Y He	6	6
(Australia) D Kelly	4	5
(Serbia) M Kecmanović	6	7
WC	(China) Zh Zhang	6^{4}	6	6
6	(South Korea) S-w Kwon	7^{7}	4	1
3	(South Korea) D-h Lee	4	3
(China) Z Li	6	6
(Japan) T Niki	3	4
WC	(China) Y Wu	6	6
(Japan) Y Takahashi	6	6
(Russia) A Kudryavtsev	4	2
Q	(Japan) K Takeuchi	4	2
7	(Japan) H Moriya	6	6

Second round
1	(Chinese Taipei) Y-h Lu	6	6
Q	(China) Y He	1	1
(Serbia) M Kecmanović	6	6
WC	(China) Zh Zhang	3	3
(China) Z Li	2	7^{7}	6^{5}
WC	(China) Y Wu	6	6^{5}	7^{7}
(Japan) Y Takahashi	6	7
7	(Japan) H Moriya	3	5

Quarterfinals
1	(Chinese Taipei) Y-h Lu	7^{10}	3
(Serbia) M Kecmanović	6^{8}	0^{r}
WC	(China) Y Wu	6	6
(Japan) Y Takahashi	3	1

Semifinals
1	(Chinese Taipei) Y-h Lu	6	3	6
WC	(China) Y Wu	1	6	4

=== Bottom half ===
First round
5	(Lithuania) R Berankis	6^{6}	6^{4}
PR	(United Kingdom) J Ward	7^{8}	7^{7}
(Republic of Ireland) S Barry	6	5	2^{r}
Q	(India) Sidharth Rawat	3	7	3
Q	(South Korea) Y-s Chung	4	6	7
(Japan) Shuichi Sekiguchi	6	3	5
(Japan) Yuya Kibi	3	3
4	(Serbia) N Milojević	6	6
8	(China) D Wu	7	6
(Belarus) D Zhyrmont	5	1
WC	(China) X Gao	7	7^{7}
(South Korea) Kim Cheong-eui	5	6^{3}
(India) S Balaji	6	3	4
(Chinese Taipei) T Chen	3	6	6
WC	(China) F Sun	6^{0}	2
2	(Russia) E Donskoy	7^{7}	6

Second round
PR	(United Kingdom) J Ward	6	6
Q	(India) S Rawat	3	1
Q	(South Korea) Y-s Chung	6^{4}	4
4	(Serbia) N Milojević	7^{7}	6
8	(China) D Wu	3	5
WC	(China) X Gao	6	7
(Chinese Taipei) T Chen	2	2
2	(Russia) E Donskoy	6	6

Quarterfinals
PR	(United Kingdom) J Ward	6^{5}	3
4	(Serbia) N Milojević	7^{7}	6
WC	(China) X Gao	2	4
2	(Russia) E Donskoy	6	6

Semifinals
4	(Serbia) N Milojević	6^{6}	3
2	(Russia) E Donskoy	7^{8}	6
