= ZS-Sports China International Challenger =

Defunct tennis tournament
- Event name: ZS-Sports China International Challenger
- Location: Qingdao, China
- Venue: ZS Tennis Center
- Category: ATP Challenger Tour
- Surface: Clay
- Draw: 32S/32Q/16D
- Prize money: $125,000

The ZS-Sports China International Challenger was a professional tennis tournament played on clay courts. It was part of the Association of Tennis Professionals (ATP) Challenger Tour. It was held annually in Qingdao, China from 2016 to 2017.

== Past finals ==
=== Singles ===
Year	Champion	Runner-up	Score
2017	(Serbia) Janko Tipsarević	(Germany) Oscar Otte	6–3, 7–6^{(11–9)}
2016	(Serbia) Janko Tipsarević	(Spain) Rubén Ramírez Hidalgo	1–6, 7–5, 6–1

=== Doubles ===
Year	Champions	Runners-up	Score
2017	(Germany) Gero Kretschmer (Germany) Alexander Satschko	(Germany) Andreas Mies (Germany) Oscar Otte	2–6, 7–6^{(8–6)}, [10–3]
2016	(Serbia) Danilo Petrović (France) Tak Khunn Wang	(China) Gong Maoxin (China) Zhang Ze	6–2, 4–6, [10–5]
