= Tak Khunn Wang =

French tennis player (born 1991)

- Country (sports): France
- Born: 13 October 1991 (age 34) Paris, France
- Height: 1.80 m (5 ft 11 in)
- Plays: Right-handed (two-handed backhand)
- Prize money: $124,405

Singles
- Career record: 0–0
- Career titles: 0
- Highest ranking: No. 265 (3 February 2014)

Doubles
- Career record: 0–0
- Career titles: 0
- Highest ranking: No. 312 (15 August 2016)

Tak Khunn Wang (born 13 October 1991) is a French tennis player. Wang has a career high ATP singles ranking of 265 achieved on 3 February 2014. He also has a career high doubles ranking of 312 achieved on 15 August 2016. Wang has won 1 ATP Challenger doubles title at the 2016 ZS-Sports China International Challenger.

== Tour titles ==
Legend
Grand Slam (0)
ATP Masters Series (0)
ATP Tour (0)
Challengers (1)

=== Doubles ===
Result	W–L	Date	Tournament	Tier	Surface	Partner	Opponents	Score
Win	1–0	Aug 2016	Qingdao, China	Challenger	Clay	(Serbia) Danilo Petrović	(China) Gong Maoxin / (China) Zhang Ze	6–2, 4–6, [10–5]
