= Rubén Ramírez Hidalgo =

Spanish tennis player (born 1978)

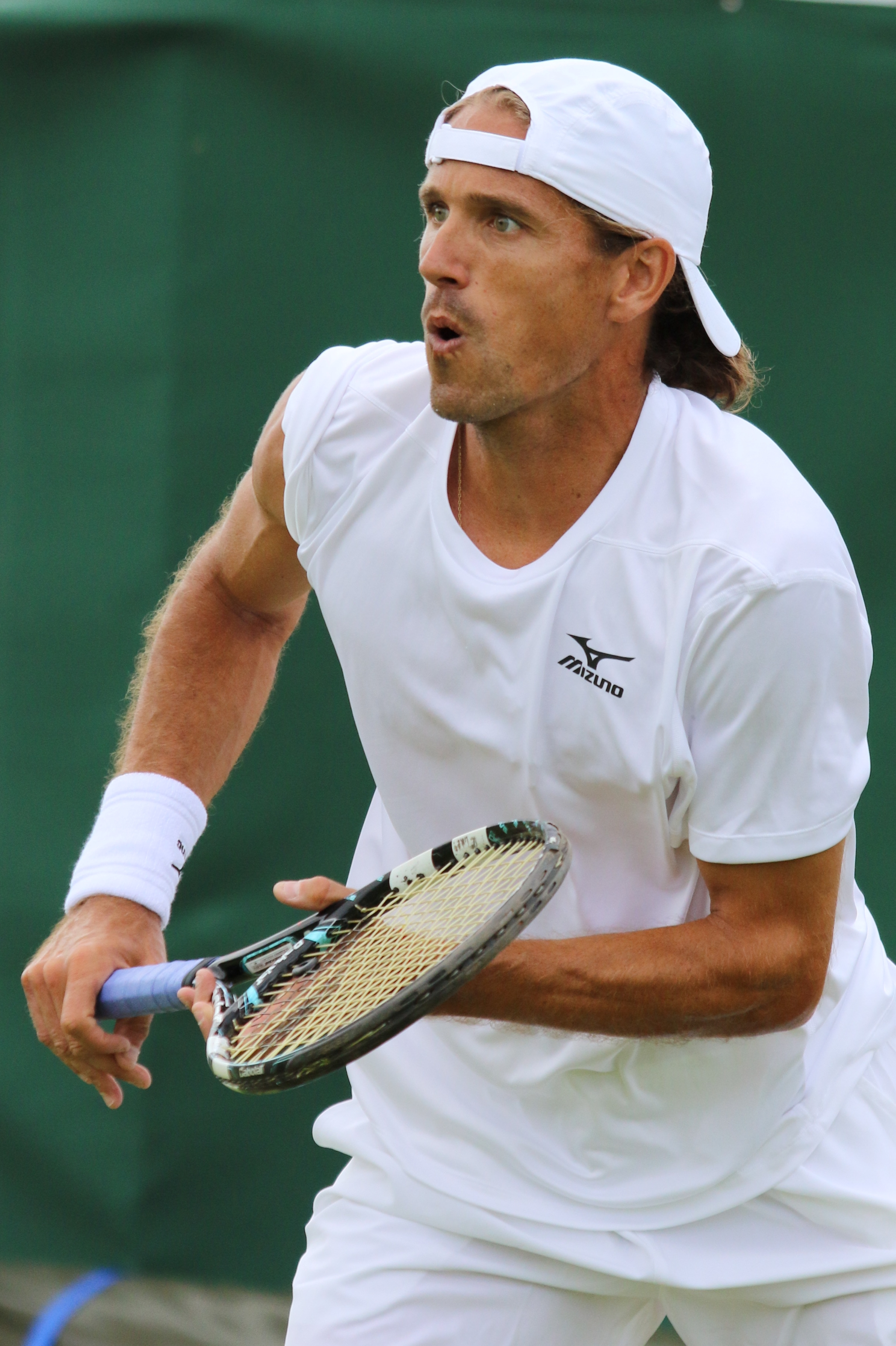
- Country (sports): Spain
- Residence: Alicante, Spain
- Born: 6 January 1978 (age 48) Alicante, Spain
- Height: 1.83 m (6 ft 0 in)
- Turned pro: 1998
- Retired: 2017
- Plays: Right-handed (two-handed backhand)
- Prize money: US$2,346,155

Singles
- Career record: 68–133
- Career titles: 0
- Highest ranking: No. 50 (2 October 2006)
- Current ranking: No. 800 (2 July 2018)

Grand Slam singles results
- Australian Open: 1R (2004, 2007, 2011, 2013)
- French Open: 4R (2006)
- Wimbledon: 1R (2004, 2006, 2007, 2011, 2012)
- US Open: 2R (2012)

Doubles
- Career record: 43–91
- Career titles: 0
- Highest ranking: No. 54 (16 January 2012)
- Current ranking: No. 921 (2 July 2018)

Grand Slam doubles results
- Australian Open: 3R (2011)
- French Open: 2R (2011)
- Wimbledon: 1R (2004, 2006, 2007, 2011, 2012)
- US Open: 2R (2009, 2010)
- Last updated on: 2 July 2018.

Rubén Ramírez Hidalgo (Spanish pronunciation: [ruˈβen raˈmiɾeθ iˈðalɣo]; born 6 January 1978 in Alicante, Spain) is a former professional male tennis player from Spain. His career-high ATP singles ranking is world No. 50, achieved on 2 October 2006. His favourite surface is clay, where he has won numerous ATP Challenger Tour events, and has reached the final in three events of the ATP tour, all in 2007, finishing runner-up in all three finals.

== Career ==
Ramírez Hidalgo turned pro in 1998.

In 2001, Ramírez Hidalgo won his first ATP tour match in Bucharest, defeating Attila Sávolt.

In 2003, he suffered the ignominy of becoming the only player to ever lose a tour level match to French journeyman Éric Prodon, losing 7–6 6–2 in Casablanca. However, he was able to bounce back later in the year at Sopot, where he reached his first ever tour level semi-final, bravely losing in three sets to David Ferrer.

After dropping down the rankings, early 2006 saw a return to good form. A semi-final run at Viña del Mar saw Ramírez Hidalgo climb back into the top 100. This tournament included his first ever win over a top 10 player, a defeat of former French Open champion Gastón Gaudio. Ramírez Hidalgo was eventually defeated by José Acasuso.

At the 2006 French Open, Ramírez Hidalgo won a Grand Slam match for the first time, eventually reaching the 4th round in a Grand Slam event for the first time in his career, defeating Thierry Ascione, Christophe Rochus and future finalist David Ferrer. Before the tournament, he had lost four consecutive times in the first round of a Grand Slam, a pattern he proceeded to return to for a further 9 appearances.

Ramírez Hidalgo's strong form continued into the latter half of 2006, where he reached the semi-final in Amersfoort (l. Nicolás Massú.) and included rare success on hard courts, where he defeated world no. 5 and home favourite James Blake. Further success came in Palermo, where his run to the semi-final was halted by Nicolás Lapentti. In October 2006, his ranking peaked at no. 50.

2007 started strongly for Ramírez Hidalgo, with another semi-final run, this time in Casablanca. An impressive showing was halted by Albert Montañés.

In his later career, Ramírez Hidalgo became a stalwart of the ATP Challenger tour, whilst still enjoying occasional success on the main tour. 2012 marked his last Grand Slam match win, at the US Open, where he defeated Somdev Devvarman, before losing to big serving Sam Querrey. At Houston in 2013, he recorded what was to be his last ever main tour victory, defeating compatriot Fernando Verdasco, before losing to Rhyne Williams in the quarter-final.

On 4 August 2016, after defeating Ante Pavić in the 2nd round of the Chengdu Challenger, Ramírez Hidalgo became the first player ever to win 400 matches in the ATP Challenger Tour tournaments.

Ramírez Hidalgo retired from professional tennis after the end of the 2017 season.

== ATP career finals ==
=== Doubles: 3 (3 runner-ups) ===
Legend Grand Slam tournaments (0–0) ATP World Tour Finals (0–0) ATP World Tour Masters 1000 (0–0) ATP World Tour 500 Series (0–0) ATP World Tour 250 Series (0–3)	Titles by surface Hard (0–0) Clay (0–3) Grass (0–0) Carpet (0–0)	Titles by setting Outdoor (0–3) Indoor (0–0)

Result	W–L	Date	Tournament	Tier	Surface	Partner	Opponents	Score
Loss	0–1	Feb 2007	Chile Open, Chile	International	Clay	(Spain) Albert Montañés	(Chile) Paul Capdeville (Spain) Óscar Hernández	6–4, 4–6, [6–10]
Loss	0–2	Feb 2007	Brasil Open, Brasil	International	Clay	(Spain) Albert Montañés	(Czech Republic) Lukáš Dlouhý (Czech Republic) Pavel Vízner	2–6, 6–7^{(4–7)}
Loss	0–3	Feb 2007	Argentina Open, Argentina	International	Clay	(Spain) Albert Montañés	(Argentina) Martín García (Argentina) Sebastián Prieto	4–6, 2–6

== ATP Challenger Tour ==
=== Singles finals (11–13) ===
Result	Date	Tournament	Surface	Opponent	Score
Win	3 September 2002	Brașov, Romania	Clay	(Croatia) Lovro Zovko	2–6, 6–1, 7–5
Win	7 October 2002	Barcelona, Spain	Clay	(Spain) Albert Portas	4–6, 6–4, 6–1
Loss	12 May 2003	Zagreb, Croatia	Clay	(Belgium) Kristof Vliegen	1–6, 6–4, 0–6
Win	1 July 2003	Košice, Slovakia	Clay	(Czech Republic) Tomáš Zíb	6–3, 4–6, 6–4
Loss	10 May 2004	Zagreb, Croatia	Clay	(Chile) Adrián García	3–6, 5–7
Win	24 May 2005	Ljubljana, Slovenia	Clay	(Italy) Massimo Dell'Acqua	6–7^{(2–7)}, 5–2 ret.
Loss	24 October 2005	Santiago, Chile	Clay	(Brazil) Júlio Silva	2–6, 3–6
Win	14 January 2008	La Serena, Chile	Clay	(Spain) David Marrero	6–3, 6–1
Loss	18 August 2008	San Sebastián, Spain	Clay	(Spain) Pablo Andújar	4–6, 1–6
Loss	15 September 2008	Todi, Italy	Clay	(Italy) Tomas Tenconi	6–4, 3–6, 0–6
Loss	20 October 2008	Buenos Aires, Argentina	Clay	(Argentina) Martín Vassallo Argüello	3–6, 6–4, 5–7
Win	14 March 2010	Rabat, Morocco	Clay	(Spain) Marcel Granollers	6–4, 6–4
Win	12 June 2010	Košice, Slovakia	Clay	(Serbia) Filip Krajinović	6–3, 6–2
Win	5 July 2010	Pozoblanco, Spain	Hard	(Spain) Roberto Bautista Agut	7–6^{(8–6)}, 6–4
Loss	12 September 2010	Rijeka, Croatia	Clay	(Slovenia) Blaž Kavčič	4–6, 6–3, 6–7^{(5–7)}
Loss	11 September 2011	Sevilla, Spain	Clay	(Spain) Daniel Gimeno Traver	3–6, 3–6
Win	7 April 2012	San Luis Potosí, Mexico	Clay	(Italy) Paolo Lorenzi	3–6, 6–3, 6–4
Loss	15 April 2012	Pereira, Colombia	Clay	(Colombia) Carlos Salamanca	7–5, 2–6, 1–6
Win	6 May 2012	Tunis, Tunisia	Clay	(France) Jérémy Chardy	6–1, 6–4
Win	15 April 2013	Panama City, Panama	Clay	(Colombia) Alejandro González	6–4, 5–7, 7–6^{(7–4)}
Loss	7 July 2013	Timișoara, Romania	Clay	(Austria) Andreas Haider-Maurer	4–6, 6–3, 4–6
Loss	14 May 2016	Samarkand, Uzbekistan	Clay	(Russia) Karen Khachanov	1–6, 7–6^{(8–6)}, 1–6
Loss	7 August 2016	Chengdu, China	Clay	(Chinese Taipei) Jason Jung	4–6, 2–6
Loss	14 August 2016	Qingdao, China	Clay	(Serbia) Janko Tipsarević	6–1, 5–7, 1–6

=== Doubles titles (21) ===
Date	Tournament	Surface	Partnering	Opponents	Score
7 September 2004	Brașov, Romania	Clay	(Spain) Salvador Navarro	(Argentina) Juan Pablo Brzezicki (Argentina) Juan Pablo Guzmán	6–3, 6–2
4 July 2005	Geneva, Switzerland	Clay	(Spain) Santiago Ventura	(Switzerland) Stéphane Bohli (Switzerland) Roman Valent	6–3, 7–5
3 April 2006	Monza, Italy	Clay	(Italy) Tomas Tenconi	(Italy) Leonardo Azzaro (Germany) Christopher Kas	4–6, 6–4, [13–11]
28 July 2008	Timişoara, Romania	Clay	(Spain) Daniel Munoz-de la Nava	(Romania) Adrian Cruciat (Romania) Florin Mergea	3–6, 6–4, [11–9]
22 September 2008	Bucharest, Romania	Clay	(Spain) Santiago Ventura	(Italy) Andrea Arnaboldi (Argentina) Máximo González	6–3, 5–7, [10–6]
14 March 2009	Rabat, Morocco	Clay	(Spain) Santiago Ventura	(Germany) Michael Kohlmann (Germany) Philipp Marx	6–4, 7–6^{(7–5)}
21 March 2009	Marrakech, Morocco	Clay	(Spain) Santiago Ventura	(Spain) Alberto Martín (Spain) Daniel Munoz-de la Nava	6–3, 7–6^{(7–5)}
29 March 2009	Barletta, Italy	Clay	(Spain) Santiago Ventura	(Uruguay) Pablo Cuevas (Peru) Luis Horna	7–6^{(7–1)}, 6–2
31 May 2009	Alessandria, Italy	Clay	(Spain) José Antonio Sánchez de Luna	(Argentina) Martín Alund (Chile) Guillermo Hormazábal	6–4, 6–2
7 June 2009	Furth, Germany	Clay	(Spain) Santiago Ventura	(Germany) Simon Greul (Italy) Alessandro Motti	4–6, 6–1, [10–6]
14 June 2009	Košice, Slovakia	Clay	(Spain) Santiago Ventura	(Slovakia) Dominik Hrbatý (Slovakia) Martin Kližan	6–2, 7–6^{(7–5)}
18 October 2009	Asunción, Paraguay	Clay	(Spain) Santiago Ventura	(Slovakia) Máximo González (Argentina) Eduardo Schwank	6–3, 7–6^{(7–5)}
20 June 2010	Milan, Italy	Clay	(Italy) Daniele Bracciali	(South Africa) Jeff Coetzee (United States) James Cerretani	6–4, 7–5
22 August 2010	San Sebastián, Spain	Clay	(Spain) Santiago Ventura	(United States) Brian Battistone (Sweden) Andreas Siljeström	6–4, 7–6^{(7–3)}
24 October 2010	Santiago, Chile	Clay	(Spain) Daniel Munoz de la Nava	(Croatia) Nikola Ćirić (Croatia) Goran Tošić	6–4, 6–2
15 May 2011	Zagreb, Croatia	Clay	(Spain) Daniel Muñoz de la Nava	(Croatia) Mate Pavić (Croatia) Franko Škugor	6–2, 7–6^{(12–10)}
11 September 2011	Seville, Spain	Clay	(Spain) Daniel Muñoz de la Nava	(Spain) Gerard Granollers (Spain) Adrián Menéndez	6–4, 6–7^{(4–7)}, [13–11]
17 September 2011	Banja Luka, Bosnia-Herzegovina	Clay	(Italy) Marco Crugnola	(Czech Republic) Jan Mertl (Netherlands) Matwé Middelkoop	7–6^{(7–3)}, 3–6, [10–8]
1 October 2011	Madrid, Spain	Clay	(Spain) David Marrero	(Spain) Daniel Gimeno Traver (United Kingdom) Morgan Phillips	6–4, 6–7^{(8–10)}, [11–9]
5 November 2011	São Leopoldo, Brazil	Clay	(Brazil) Franco Ferreiro	(Portugal) Gastão Elias (Portugal) Frederico Gil	6–7^{(4–7)}, 6–3, [11–9]
4 September 2016	Curitiba, Brazil	Clay	(Spain) Pere Riba	(Brazil) André Ghem (Brazil) Fabrício Neis	6–7^{(3–7)}, 6–4, [10–7]

== Performance timelines ==
Key
W	F	SF	QF	#R	RR	Q#	DNQ	A	NH

(W) winner; (F) finalist; (SF) semifinalist; (QF) quarterfinalist; (#R) rounds 4, 3, 2, 1; (RR) round-robin stage; (Q#) qualification round; (DNQ) did not qualify; (A) absent; (NH) not held; (SR) strike rate (events won / competed); (W–L) win–loss record.

=== Singles ===
Tournament	1998	1999	2000	2001	2002	2003	2004	2005	2006	2007	2008	2009	2010	2011	2012	2013	2014	2015	2016	2017	SR	W–L
Grand Slam tournaments
Australian Open	A	A	Q1	A	Q2	A	1R	A	A	1R	A	A	A	1R	A	1R	A	A	A	A	0 / 4	0–4
French Open	A	A	A	A	Q3	Q2	1R	Q1	4R	1R	Q3	A	Q2	2R	1R	A	Q1	Q1	A	Q1	0 / 5	4–5
Wimbledon	A	A	A	A	A	A	1R	Q1	1R	1R	A	A	A	1R	1R	A	A	A	Q2	Q1	0 / 5	0–5
US Open	A	A	A	A	A	1R	A	A	1R	1R	A	1R	1R	A	2R	A	A	A	A	A	0 / 6	1–6
Win–loss	0–0	0–0	0–0	0–0	0–0	0–1	0–3	0–0	3–3	0–4	0–0	0–1	0–1	1–3	1–3	0–1	0–0	0–0	0–0	0–0	0 / 20	5–20
ATP Masters Series
Indian Wells	A	A	A	A	A	A	1R	A	A	A	A	A	A	1R	A	A	A	A	A	A	0 / 2	0–2
Miami	A	A	A	A	A	A	2R	A	A	1R	A	A	A	2R	A	A	A	A	A	A	0 / 3	1–3
Monte Carlo	A	A	A	A	A	A	A	A	Q2	A	2R	Q2	A	Q1	A	A	A	A	A	A	0 / 1	1–1
Madrid	Not Held				A	Q1	A	A	Q1	Q1	A	Q1	A	Q2	A	Q2	A	A	A	A	0 / 0	0–0
Rome	A	A	A	A	A	A	1R	A	3R	Q2	A	Q1	A	A	A	A	A	A	A	A	0 / 2	2–2
Win–loss	0–0	0–0	0–0	0–0	0–0	0–0	0–3	0–0	2–1	0–1	1–1	0–0	0–0	1–2	0–0	0–0	0–0	0–0	0–0	0–0	0 / 8	4–8
Career statistics
Overall win–loss	0–0	0–0	0–0	1–1	0–3	5–11	7–19	5–5	25–20	9–18	1–6	4–10	1–4	5–15	3–12	2–6	0–3	0–0	0–0	0–0	68–133	
Year-end ranking	620	381	333	154	141	80	130	120	57	133	121	156	77	130	91	166	224	253	148	430	34%	

=== Doubles ===
Tournament	1998	1999	2000	2001	2002	2003	2004	2005	2006	2007	2008	2009	2010	2011	2012	2013	2014	2015	2016	2017	SR	W–L
Grand Slam tournaments
Australian Open	A	A	A	A	A	A	1R	A	A	2R	A	A	A	3R	A	A	A	A	A	A	0 / 3	3–3
French Open	A	A	A	A	A	A	1R	A	A	1R	A	A	A	2R	1R	A	A	A	A	A	0 / 4	1–4
Wimbledon	A	A	A	A	A	A	1R	A	1R	1R	A	A	A	1R	1R	A	A	A	A	A	0 / 5	0–5
US Open	A	A	A	A	A	A	A	A	1R	1R	A	2R	2R	A	1R	A	A	A	A	A	0 / 5	2–5
Win–loss	0–0	0–0	0–0	0–0	0–0	0–0	0–3	0–0	0–2	1–4	0–0	1–1	1–1	3–3	0–3	0–0	0–0	0–0	0–0	0–0	0 / 17	6–17
ATP Masters Series
Madrid	Not Held				A	A	A	A	A	A	A	2R	A	2R	A	A	A	A	A	A	0 / 2	2–2
Career statistics
Titles / Finals	0 / 0	0 / 0	0 / 0	0 / 0	0 / 0	0 / 0	0 / 0	0 / 0	0 / 0	0 / 3	0 / 0	0 / 0	0 / 0	0 / 0	0 / 0	0 / 0	0 / 0	0 / 0	0 / 0	0 / 0	0 / 3	
Overall win–loss	0–0	0–0	0–0	0–0	0–0	1–4	3–13	0–0	1–11	12–18	6–4	2–10	3–4	10–13	2–10	3–3	0–0	0–0	0–0	0–1	43–91	
Year-end ranking	–	1271	475	465	310	199	167	218	303	73	105	81	120	56	177	278	296	735	341	663	32%	

== Top 10 wins ==
Season	1998	1999	2000	2001	2002	2003	2004	2005	2006	2007	2008	2009	2010	2011	2012	2013	2014	2015	2016	2017	Total
Wins	0	0	0	0	0	0	0	0	3	0	0	0	0	0	0	0	0	0	0	0	3

#	Player	Rank	Event	Surface	Rd	Score	RRH Rank
2006
1.	(Argentina) Gastón Gaudio	8	Viña del Mar, Chile	Clay	2R	6–7^{(6–8)}, 6–1, 6–4	106
2.	(Argentina) Guillermo Coria	7	Buenos Aires, Argentina	Clay	2R	7–5, 6–2	93
3.	(United States) James Blake	5	New Haven, United States	Hard	2R	2–6, 7–6^{(8–6)}, 7–6^{(7–4)}	57
