= Chengdu Challenger =

Tennis tournament held in Chengdu, China

- 2019 Chengdu Challenger

Defunct tennis tournament
- Event name: Chengdu Challenger
- Location: Chengdu, China
- Venue: Sichuan International Tennis Centre
- Category: ATP Challenger Tour
- Surface: Hard
- Draw: 32S/32Q/16D
- Prize money: $125,000

The Chengdu Challenger was a professional tennis tournament played on hardcourts. It was part of the ATP Challenger Tour and was held annually in Chengdu, China, from 2016 till 2019.

== Past finals ==
=== Singles ===
| Year | Champion | Runner-up | Score |
|---|---|---|---|
| 2019 | (South Korea) Chung Hyeon | (Japan) Yūichi Sugita | 6–4, 6–3 |
| 2018 | (China) Zhang Ze | (Switzerland) Henri Laaksonen | 2–6, 5–2 ret. |
| 2017 | (Chinese Taipei) Lu Yen-hsun | (Russia) Evgeny Donskoy | 6–3, 6–4 |
| 2016 | (Chinese Taipei) Jason Jung | (Spain) Rubén Ramírez Hidalgo | 6–4, 6–2 |

=== Doubles ===
| Year | Champions | Runners-up | Score |
|---|---|---|---|
| 2019 | (India) Arjun Kadhe (India) Saketh Myneni | (South Korea) Nam Ji-sung (South Korea) Song Min-kyu | 6–3, 0–6, [10–6] |
| 2018 | (China) Gong Maoxin (China) Zhang Ze | (Russia) Mikhail Elgin (Belarus) Yaraslav Shyla | 6–4, 6–4 |
| 2017 | (India) Sriram Balaji (India) Vishnu Vardhan | (Chinese Taipei) Hsieh Cheng-peng (Chinese Taipei) Peng Hsien-yin | 6–3, 6–4 |
| 2016 | (China) Gong Maoxin (China) Zhang Ze | (China) Gao Xin (China) Li Zhe | 6–3, 4–6, [13–11] |
