= Zhang Ze =

Chinese tennis player

Zhang Ze 张择
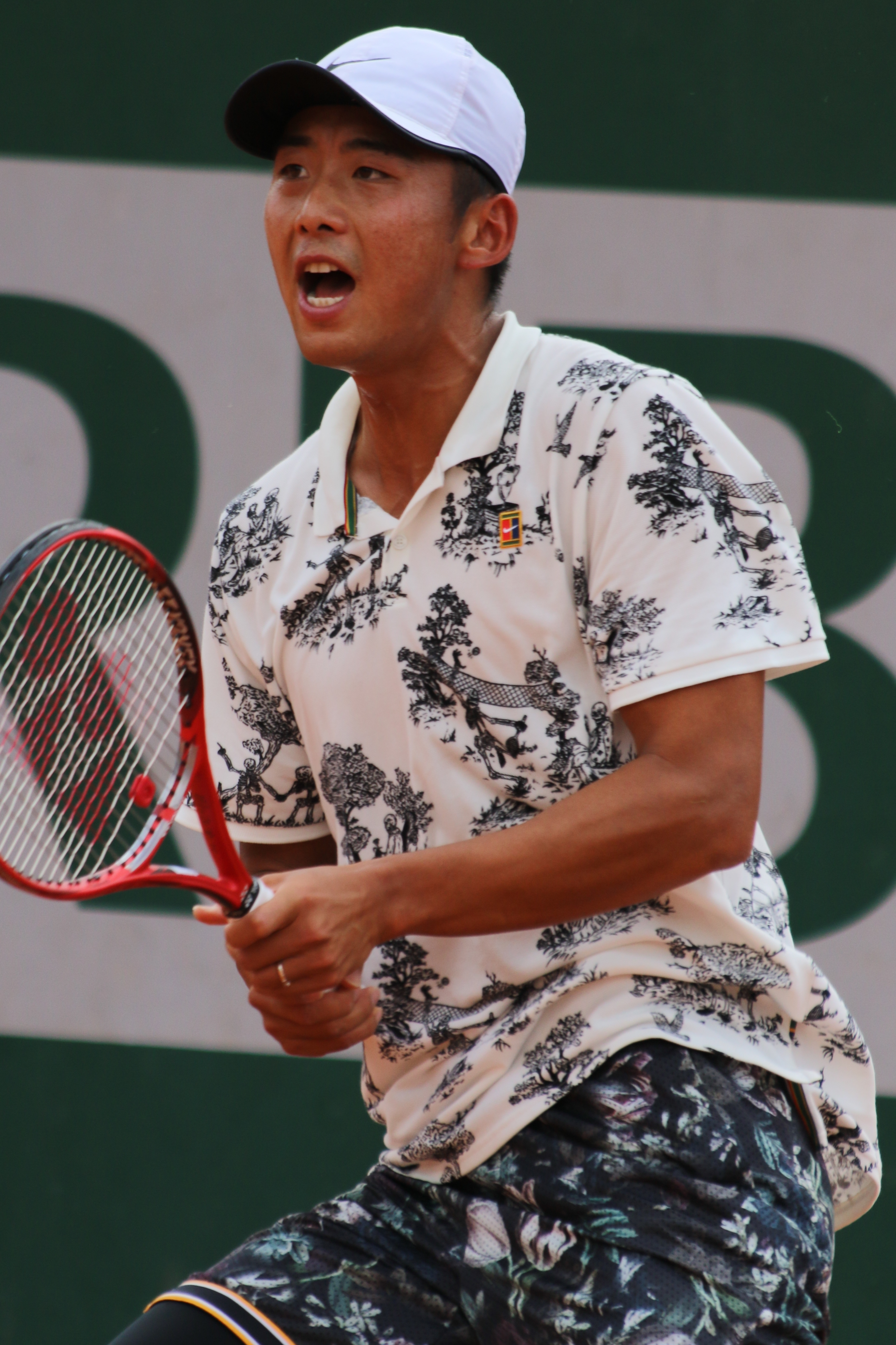
- Country (sports): China
- Residence: Nanjing, China
- Born: July 4, 1990 (age 36) Nanjing, China
- Height: 1.88 m (6 ft 2 in)
- Turned pro: 2005
- Retired: 2023
- Plays: right-handed
- Coach: Jiang Wei
- Prize money: US$1,106,768

Singles
- Career record: 19–41 (ATP World Tour, Grand Slam main draw and Davis Cup matches)
- Career titles: 0
- Highest ranking: No. 148 (27 May 2013)

Grand Slam singles results
- Australian Open: 1R (2014, 2015)
- French Open: Q2 (2012, 2019)
- Wimbledon: Q2 (2012, 2014, 2015)
- US Open: Q3 (2014)

Doubles
- Career record: 12–28
- Career titles: 0
- Highest ranking: No. 78 (18 March 2019)

Grand Slam doubles results
- Australian Open: 2R (2019)

Grand Slam mixed doubles results
- Australian Open: 2R (2015)
Medal record
Representing China
Men's tennis
Asian Games
Silver medal – second place	2014 Incheon	Team Event
Bronze medal – third place	2014 Incheon	Mixed Doubles

Zhang Ze (Chinese: 张择; pinyin: Zhāng Zé; Mandarin pronunciation: [ʈʂáŋ tsɤ̌]; born July 4, 1990), is a Chinese former professional tennis player. Zhang's career highlights include reaching the quarterfinals of the 2012 China Open (defeating Richard Gasquet en route), playing the Australian Open main draw in two consecutive years (2014 and 2015), and teaming up with Roger Federer to play doubles at the 2013 Shanghai Rolex Masters.

== Career ==
Zhang's early years were spent on the ITF Circuit throughout Asia. In February 2008, Zhang made his first appearance in the qualifying draw of an ATP Challenger tournament in Melbourne, defeating Mikal Statham. In the second round, Zhang lost to Nima Roshan.

On 28 March 2010, Zhang won the first single's title of his professional career in an ITF Futures event in Mengzi City, China. He defeated Riccardo Ghedin. Just under two months later, on 22 May, Zhang reached his first final on the Challenger Tour in Fergana, Uzbekistan, after entering as a qualifier. He lost to Evgeny Kirillov.

In 2010, Zhang became, for the first time in his career, Chinese champion in both singles and doubles of the QuanYunHui. He was selected to play for China’s Davis Cup team.

On 22 May 2011, exactly a year to the day of his first final on the Challenger Tour, Zhang won his second ITF single's title by defeating Lee Hsin-han in Guiyang, China.

He played the qualifying rounds at the 2012 Wimbledon, and the 2012 US Open, where he made it to the second round but lost.

In the 2012 China Open, Zhang defeated world No.14 Richard Gasquet in the second round, before he lost to Florian Mayer on the following day.

In October 2013, Zhang teamed up with Roger Federer at the 2013 Shanghai Rolex Masters. They beat Kevin Anderson and Dmitry Tursunov. However, the pair were defeated in the second round.

In January 2014, Zhang qualified in men's singles for the 2014 Australian Open, his first grand slam tournament. In the first round he lost to world No. 33 and 31-seed Fernando Verdasco in four sets.

In January 2015, 187-ranked Zhang earned one of eight wildcards to the 2015 Australian Open men's singles main draw. Zhang was the highest-ranked men's singles player from China at the time and was the only China representative in men's singles, men's doubles, and mixed doubles (male). In singles he lost in the first round to unseeded Australian two-time Grand Slam winner Lleyton Hewitt, ranked 87 in the world at the time, in four sets. In men's doubles, Zhang and partner Lee Hsin-han of Taiwan were given a wildcard to the main draw and faced number 2 seeds Julien Benneteau and Édouard Roger-Vasselin of France in the first round and lost in straight sets. In mixed doubles, Zhang and partner Chang Kai-Chen of Taiwan were given a wildcard to the main draw and they advanced to the second round.

In October 2015, Zhang was one of three players to receive a wildcard into the main draw of the China Open. After upsetting Denis Istomin in the first round, Zhang was defeated by world No.1 and defending champion Novak Djokovic, who went on to win the tournament for the sixth time. Despite a comfortable win for Djokovic, he heaped praise on the youngster, saying he has "Top 100 stuff."

== Challenger and Futures finals ==
=== Singles: 26 (10–16) ===
Legend (singles) ATP Challenger Tour (2–5) ITF Futures Tour (8–11)	Titles by surface Hard (9–16) Clay (1–0) Grass (0–0) Carpet (0–0)

Result	W–L	Date	Tournament	Tier	Surface	Opponent	Score
Loss	0–1	Jan 2009	China F2, Shenzhen	Futures	Hard	(China) Zeng Shaoxuan	4–6, 0–2 ret.
Loss	0–2	May 2009	China F3, Taizhou	Futures	Hard	(China) Gong Maoxin	3–6, 6–4, 4–6
Loss	0–3	Feb 2010	Israel F2, Eilat	Futures	Hard	(Slovakia) Andrej Martin	1–6, 1–6
Win	1–3	Mar 2010	China F2, Mengzi	Futures	Hard	(Italy) Riccardo Ghedin	6–1, 6–4
Loss	1–4	Apr 2010	Korea F3, Changwon	Futures	Hard	(United States) Jordan Cox	4–6, 3–6
Loss	1–5	May 2010	Fergana, Uzbekistan	Challenger	Hard	(Russia) Evgeny Kirillov	3–6, 6–2, 2–6
Loss	1–6	Jan 2011	China F2, Mengzi	Futures	Hard	(China) Gong Maoxin	1–6, 7–6^{(7–3)}, 2–6
Win	2–6	May 2011	China F6, Guiyang	Futures	Hard (i)	(Chinese Taipei) Lee Hsin-han	6–1, 6–0
Win	3–6	Jun 2011	China F7, Shenzhen	Futures	Hard	(South Korea) An Jae-sung	6–4, 6–2
Loss	3–7	Jan 2012	China F2, Shenzhen	Futures	Hard	(United States) Austin Krajicek	6–3, 3–6, 6–7^{(4–7)}
Loss	3–8	Feb 2012	Australia F1, Toowoomba	Futures	Hard	(Canada) Érik Chvojka	2–6, 6–1, 6–7^{(4–7)}
Win	4–8	Apr 2012	China F5, Chengdu	Futures	Hard	(China) Wu Di	7–6^{(7–3)}, 6–3
Loss	4–9	Apr 2012	China F6, Chengdu	Futures	Hard	(China) Wu Di	1–6, 6–7^{(6–8)}
Win	5–9	Jul 2012	Netherlands F3, Breda	Futures	Clay	(Netherlands) Thiemo de Bakker	6–4, 3–6, 6–4
Win	6–9	Feb 2013	Kazakhstan F1, Aktobe	Futures	Hard (i)	(Slovakia) Marek Semjan	6–2, 6–7^{(6–8)}, 6–1
Loss	6–10	Mar 2013	Kazakhstan F2, Aktobe	Futures	Hard (i)	(Slovakia) Marek Semjan	3–6, 7–6^{(7–5)}, 2–6
Win	7–10	Mar 2014	China F3, Yuxi	Futures	Hard	(South Korea) Chung Hyeon	7–6^{(7–3)}, 7–6^{(7–3)}
Win	8–10	Apr 2014	China F5, Chengdu	Futures	Hard	(Belarus) Dzmitry Zhyrmont	3–6, 6–3, 6–2
Loss	8–11	Jul 2015	China F10, Xi'an	Futures	Hard	(China) Li Zhe	2–6, 6–2, 4–6
Loss	8–12	Feb 2016	Kyoto, Japan	Challenger	Hard (i)	(Japan) Yūichi Sugita	7–5, 3–6, 4–6
Loss	8–13	Mar 2016	Zhuhai, China, P.R.	Challenger	Hard	(Italy) Thomas Fabbiano	7–5, 1–6, 3–6
Win	9–13	Feb 2017	San Francisco, USA	Challenger	Hard (i)	(Canada) Vasek Pospisil	7–5, 3–6, 6–2
Loss	9–14	Sep 2017	Zhangjiagang, China, P.R.	Challenger	Hard	(Chinese Taipei) Jason Jung	4–6, 6–2, 4–6
Loss	9–15	Mar 2018	Shenzhen, China, P.R.	Challenger	Hard	(Belarus) Ilya Ivashka	4–6, 2–6
Win	10–15	Aug 2018	Chengdu, China, P.R.	Challenger	Hard	(Switzerland) Henri Laaksonen	2–6, 5–2 ret.
Loss	10–16	May 2021	Greece, Heraklion	Futures	Hard	(United Kingdom) Ryan Peniston	4–6, 1–6

=== Doubles: 36 (16–20) ===
Legend (doubles) ATP Challenger Tour (11–13) ITF Futures Tour (5–7)	Titles by surface Hard (14–16) Clay (1–3) Grass (1–1) Carpet (0–0)

Result	W–L	Date	Tournament	Tier	Surface	Partner	Opponents	Score
Loss	0–1	Jan 2009	China F2, Shenzhen	Futures	Hard	(China) Zeng Shaoxuan	(United States) Rylan Rizza (United States) Kaes Van't Hof	3–6, 2–6
Win	1–1	Feb 2009	Australia F2, Berri	Futures	Grass	(China) Zeng Shaoxuan	(Australia) Kaden Hensel (Australia) Adam Hubble	6–3, 3–6, [10–6]
Win	2–1	Aug 2009	China F5, Chongqing	Futures	Hard	(China) Zeng Shaoxuan	(Chinese Taipei) Chen I-ta (Chinese Taipei) Yi Chu-huan	7–5, 7–6^{(7–5)}
Loss	2–2	Aug 2009	China F6, Jiaxing	Futures	Hard	(China) Zeng Shaoxuan	(China) Gong Maoxin (China) Xue Feng	7–6^{(7–4)}, 6–7^{(5–7)}, [7–10]
Win	3–2	Sep 2009	France F13, Bagnères-de-Bigorre	Futures	Hard	(China) Gong Maoxin	(France) Fabrice Martin (Canada) Adil Shamasdin	6–4, 6–4
Loss	3–3	Jan 2010	Israel F1, Eilat	Futures	Hard	(China) Wu Di	(Slovakia) Andrej Martin (Slovakia) Miloslav Mečíř	2–6, 3–6
Loss	3–4	Feb 2010	Azerbaijan F2, Baku	Futures	Hard (i)	(China) Wu Di	(Netherlands) Matwé Middelkoop (Netherlands) Antal van der Duim	6–7^{(8–10)}, 5–7
Win	4–4	Apr 2010	China F3, Chongqing	Futures	Hard	(China) Wu Di	(China) Gong Maoxin (China) Li Zhe	6–3, 1–6, [10–8]
Loss	4–5	Aug 2010	Astana, Kazakhstan	Challenger	Hard (i)	(China) Wu Di	(Russia) Mikhail Elgin (Austria) Nikolaus Moser	0–6, 4–6
Loss	4–6	Jul 2011	Wuhai, China, P.R.	Challenger	Hard	(China) Feng He	(Chinese Taipei) Lee Hsin-han (Chinese Taipei) Yang Tsung-hua	2–6, 6–7^{(4–7)}
Loss	4–7	Sep 2012	Ningbo, China, P.R.	Challenger	Hard	(China) Gong Maoxin	(Thailand) Sanchai Ratiwatana (Thailand) Sonchat Ratiwatana	4–6, 2–6
Loss	4–8	Mar 2013	Kazakhstan F2, Aktobe	Futures	Hard (i)	(China) Gong Maoxin	(Russia) Victor Baluda (Croatia) Mate Pavić	2–6, 3–6
Loss	4–9	Jul 2013	Beijing, China, P.R.	Challenger	Hard	(China) Gong Maoxin	(Japan) Toshihide Matsui (Thailand) Danai Udomchoke	6–4, 6–7^{(6–8)}, [8–10]
Loss	4–10	Jun 2014	Prague, Czech Republic	Challenger	Clay	(Chinese Taipei) Lee Hsin-han	(Czech Republic) Roman Jebavý (Czech Republic) Jiří Veselý	1–6, 3–6
Win	5–10	Aug 2016	Chengdu, China, P.R.	Challenger	Hard	(China) Gong Maoxin	(China) Gao Xin (China) Li Zhe	6–3, 4–6, [13–11]
Loss	5–11	Aug 2016	Qingdao, China, P.R.	Challenger	Clay	(China) Gong Maoxin	(Serbia) Danilo Petrović (France) Tak Khunn Wang	2–6, 6–4, [5–10]
Loss	5–12	Feb 2017	San Francisco, USA	Challenger	Hard (i)	(China) Gong Maoxin	(Australia) Matt Reid (Australia) John-Patrick Smith	7–6^{(7–4)}, 5–7, [7–10]
Win	6–12	Mar 2017	Zhuhai, China, P.R.	Challenger	Hard	(China) Gong Maoxin	(South Africa) Ruan Roelofse (Chinese Taipei) Yi Chu-huan	6–3, 7–6^{(7–4)}
Loss	6–13	Oct 2017	Suzhou, China, P.R.	Challenger	Hard	(China) Gong Maoxin	(China) Gao Xin (China) Sun Fajing	6–7^{(5–7)}, 6–4, [7–10]
Loss	6–14	Mar 2018	Qujing, China, P.R.	Challenger	Hard	(China) Wu Di	(Belarus) Aliaksandr Bury (Chinese Taipei) Peng Hsien-yin	7–6^{(7–3)}, 4–6, [10–12]
Win	7–14	Apr 2018	Nanchang, China, P.R.	Challenger	Clay (i)	(China) Gong Maoxin	(Philippines) Ruben Gonzales (Indonesia) Christopher Rungkat	3–6, 7–6^{(9–7)}, [10–7]
Loss	7–15	Apr 2018	Anning, China, P.R.	Challenger	Clay	(China) Gong Maoxin	(Belarus) Aliaksandr Bury (South Africa) Lloyd Harris	3–6, 4–6
Win	8–15	Jul 2018	Recanati, Italy	Challenger	Hard	(China) Gong Maoxin	(Ecuador) Gonzalo Escobar (Brazil) Fernando Romboli	2–6, 7–6^{(7–5)}, [10–8]
Win	9–15	Aug 2018	Chengdu, China, P.R.	Challenger	Hard	(China) Gong Maoxin	(Russia) Mikhail Elgin (Belarus) Yaraslav Shyla	6–4, 6–4
Win	10–15	Sep 2018	Zhangjiagang, China, P.R.	Challenger	Hard	(China) Gong Maoxin	(Australia) Bradley Mousley (Australia) Akira Santillan	w/o
Win	11–15	Sep 2018	Shanghai, China, P.R.	Challenger	Hard	(China) Gong Maoxin	(China) Hua Runhao (China) Zhang Zhizhen	6–4, 3–6, [10–4]
Win	12–15	Oct 2018	Ningbo, China, P.R.	Challenger	Hard	(China) Gong Maoxin	(Chinese Taipei) Hsieh Cheng-peng (Indonesia) Christopher Rungkat	7–5, 2–6, [10–5]
Win	13–15	Oct 2018	Liuzhou, China, P.R.	Challenger	Hard	(China) Gong Maoxin	(Chinese Taipei) Hsieh Cheng-peng (Indonesia) Christopher Rungkat	6–3, 2–6, [10–3]
Win	14–15	Feb 2019	Bangkok, Thailand	Challenger	Hard	(China) Gong Maoxin	(Chinese Taipei) Hsieh Cheng-peng (Indonesia) Christopher Rungkat	6–4, 6–4
Win	15–15	Mar 2019	Zhuhai, China, P.R.	Challenger	Hard	(China) Gong Maoxin	(Australia) Max Purcell (Australia) Luke Saville	6–4, 6–4
Loss	15–16	Jun 2019	Nottingham, Great Britain	Challenger	Grass	(China) Gong Maoxin	(Mexico) Santiago González (Pakistan) Aisam Qureshi	6–4, 6–7^{(5–7)}, [5–10]
Loss	15–17	Aug 2019	Yokkaichi, Japan	Challenger	Hard	(China) Gong Maoxin	(South Korea) Nam Ji-sung (South Korea) Song Min-kyu	3–6, 6–3, [12–14]
Loss	15–18	Jan 2020	Bangkok, Thailand	Challenger	Hard	(China) Gong Maoxin	(Mexico) Miguel Angel Reyes-Varela (Ecuador) Gonzalo Escobar	3–6, 3-6
Loss	15–19	May 2021	M15 Heraklion, Greece	World Tennis Tour	Hard	(China) Hua Runhao	(Cyprus) Petros Chrysochos (United Kingdom) Mark Whitehouse	6–4, 2–6; [6–10]
Loss	15–20	Jun 2021	M15 Heraklion, Greece	World Tennis Tour	Hard	(China) Hua Runhao	(Japan) Yuki Mochizuki (Japan) Takuto Niki	3–6, 4–6
Win	16–20	Jun 2021	M15 Heraklion, Greece	World Tennis Tour	Hard	(China) Hua Runhao	(Japan) Makoto Ochi (Ukraine) Volodymyr Uzhylovskyi	6–2, 6–7^{(6–8)}, [10–7]
