= 2017 Copa Ciudad de Tigre – Doubles =

Doubles
- 2017 Copa Ciudad de Tigre

Final
- Champions: (Argentina) Máximo González; (Argentina) Andrés Molteni
- Runners-up: (Argentina) Guido Andreozzi; (Argentina) Guillermo Durán
- Score: 6–1, 6–7^{(6–8)}, [10–5]

Events
Singles	Doubles
Copa Ciudad de Tigre	· 2018 →

This was the first edition of the 2017 Copa Ciudad de Tigre tournament.

Máximo González and Andrés Molteni won the title after defeating Guido Andreozzi and Guillermo Durán 6–1, 6–7^{(6–8)}, [10–5] in the final.

== Seeds ==
1. (Argentina) Máximo González / (Argentina) Andrés Molteni (champions)
2. (Chile) Hans Podlipnik Castillo / (United States) Max Schnur (semifinals)
3. (Spain) Íñigo Cervantes / (Chile) Julio Peralta (first round)
4. (Peru) Sergio Galdós / (Argentina) Leonardo Mayer (quarterfinals)

== Draw ==
=== Key ===
- Q = Qualifier
- WC = Wild card
- LL = Lucky loser
- Alt = Alternate
- SE = Special exempt
- PR = Protected ranking
- ITF = ITF entry
- JE = Junior exempt
- w/o = Walkover
- r = Retired
- d = Defaulted
- SR = Special ranking

First round

Quarterfinals

Semifinals

Final

1
- (Argentina) M González
- (Argentina) A Molteni
6
6^{3}
[10]

- (Uruguay) M Felder
- (France) M Janvier
3
7^{7}
[4]

1
- (Argentina) M González
- (Argentina) A Molteni
6
7

- (Sweden) C Lindell
- (Brazil) J Souza
3
7^{7}
[10]

- (Sweden) C Lindell
- (Brazil) J Souza
1
5

WC
- (Argentina) JP Paz
- (Italy) G Quinzi
6
6^{2}
[5]

1
- (Argentina) M González
- (Argentina) A Molteni
6
7^{7}

3
- (Spain) Í Cervantes
- (Chile) J Peralta
7
4
[5]

- (Argentina) F Agamenone
- (Argentina) T Lipovšek Puches
0
6^{3}

WC
- (Argentina) A Collarini
- (Argentina) JI Londero
5
6
[10]

WC
- (Argentina) A Collarini
- (Argentina) JI Londero
4
5

WC
(Argentina) Franco Emanuel Egea
(Argentina) Matías Zukas
1
5

- (Argentina) F Agamenone
- (Argentina) T Lipovšek Puches
6
7

- (Argentina) F Agamenone
- (Argentina) T Lipovšek Puches
6
7

1
- (Argentina) M González
- (Argentina) A Molteni
6
6^{6}
[10]

- (Argentina) G Andreozzi
- (Argentina) G Durán
7^{7}
6

- (Argentina) G Andreozzi
- (Argentina) G Durán
1
7^{8}
[5]

- (France) M Bourgue
- (France) T Lamasine
6^{2}
3

- (Argentina) G Andreozzi
- (Argentina) G Durán
6
4
[10]

- (Brazil) F de Paula
- (Brazil) C Zampieri
2
4

4
- (Peru) S Galdós
- (Argentina) L Mayer
1
6
[8]

4
- (Peru) S Galdós
- (Argentina) L Mayer
6
6

- (Argentina) G Andreozzi
- (Argentina) G Durán
6
6

- (Brazil) F Neis
- (Spain) R Ramírez Hidalgo
6
7^{9}

2
- (Chile) H Podlipnik Castillo
- (United States) M Schnur
4
4

(Brazil) R Dutra Silva
(Brazil) E Russi Assumpção
3
6^{7}

- (Brazil) F Neis
- (Spain) R Ramírez Hidalgo
6
2
[7]

- (Argentina) F Argüello
- (Argentina) F Coria
3
6^{4}

2
- (Chile) H Podlipnik Castillo
- (United States) M Schnur
3
6
[10]

2
- (Chile) H Podlipnik Castillo
- (United States) M Schnur
6
7^{7}
