= 2017 German Open – Doubles =

Doubles
- 2017 German Open

Final
- Champions: (Croatia) Ivan Dodig (Croatia) Mate Pavić
- Runners-up: (Uruguay) Pablo Cuevas (Spain) Marc López
- Score: 6–3, 6–4

Details
- Draw: 16
- Seeds: 4

Events
Singles	Doubles
- German Open Tennis Championships

Henri Kontinen and John Peers were the defending champions, but chose not to participate this year.

Ivan Dodig and Mate Pavić won the title, defeating Pablo Cuevas and Marc López in the final, 6–3, 6–4.

== Seeds ==
1. (Croatia) Ivan Dodig / (Croatia) Mate Pavić (champions)
2. (Uruguay) Pablo Cuevas / (Spain) Marc López (final)
3. (Chile) Julio Peralta / (Argentina) Horacio Zeballos (semifinals)
4. (Poland) Marcin Matkowski / (Serbia) Nenad Zimonjić (quarterfinals)

== Draw ==
Key

- Q = Qualifier
- WC = Wild card
- LL = Lucky loser
- Alt = Alternate
- ITF = ITF entry
- PR = Protected ranking
- SR = Special ranking
- SE = Special exempt
- JE = Junior exempt
- JR = Junior Accelerator Programme entrant
- CO = College Accelerator Programme entrant
- NG = Next Gen Accelerator Program entrant
- w/o = Walkover
- r = Retired
- d = Defaulted

=== Draw ===
First round
1	(Croatia) I Dodig (Croatia) M Pavić	6	6
(France) B Paire (France) É Roger-Vasselin	4	3
Q	(Argentina) F Delbonis (Argentina) L Mayer	3	4
(Belarus) M Mirnyi (Canada) D Nestor	6	6
3	(Chile) J Peralta (Argentina) H Zeballos	6	6
(Germany) A Begemann (Germany) J-L Struff	2	3
WC	(Germany) K Krawietz (Germany) T Pütz	6	6^{4}	[4]
(Brazil) R Dutra Silva (Spain) A Ramos Viñolas	2	7^{7}	[10]
WC	(Germany) D Altmaier (Germany) T Haas	6^{12}	6^{4}
(Austria) J Knowle (Spain) D Marrero	7^{14}	7^{7}
(Argentina) C Berlocq (Argentina) D Schwartzman	6^{5}	6^{4}
4	(Poland) M Matkowski (Serbia) N Zimonjić	7^{7}	7^{7}
(United Kingdom) A Bedene (France) G Simon	6	3	[8]
(Croatia) N Mektić (Sweden) A Siljeström	4	6	[10]
(Spain) F Verdasco (Czech Republic) J Veselý
2	(Uruguay) P Cuevas (Spain) M López	w/o

Quarterfinals
1	(Croatia) I Dodig (Croatia) M Pavić	7^{7}	6
(Belarus) M Mirnyi (Canada) D Nestor	6^{5}	3
3	(Chile) J Peralta (Argentina) H Zeballos	w/o
(Brazil) R Dutra Silva (Spain) A Ramos Viñolas
(Austria) J Knowle (Spain) D Marrero	6	6
4	(Poland) M Matkowski (Serbia) N Zimonjić	2	3
(Croatia) N Mektić (Sweden) A Siljeström	2	4
2	(Uruguay) P Cuevas (Spain) M López	6	6

Semifinals
1	(Croatia) I Dodig (Croatia) M Pavić	7	6
3	(Chile) J Peralta (Argentina) H Zeballos	5	0
(Austria) J Knowle (Spain) D Marrero	4	6	[4]
2	(Uruguay) P Cuevas (Spain) M López	6	4	[10]

Final
1	(Croatia) I Dodig (Croatia) M Pavić	6	6
2	(Uruguay) P Cuevas (Spain) M López	3	4

== Qualifying ==
=== Seeds ===
1. (Argentina) Máximo González / (Ukraine) Sergiy Stakhovsky (qualifying competition)
2. (Argentina) Federico Delbonis / (Argentina) Leonardo Mayer (qualified)

=== Qualifiers ===
1. (Argentina) Federico Delbonis / (Argentina) Leonardo Mayer

=== Qualifying draw ===
First round
1	(Argentina) Máximo González (Ukraine) Sergiy Stakhovsky	6	6
WC	(Germany) Rudolf Molleker (Germany) Louis Wessels	2	2
(Uruguay) Ariel Behar (Russia) Dmitry Tursunov	5	4
2	(Argentina) Federico Delbonis (Argentina) Leonardo Mayer	7	6

Qualifying competition
1	(Argentina) Máximo González (Ukraine) Sergiy Stakhovsky	7^{9}	3	[8]
2	(Argentina) Federico Delbonis (Argentina) Leonardo Mayer	6^{7}	6	[10]
