= 2017 Copa Ciudad de Tigre – Singles =

Singles
- 2017 Copa Ciudad de Tigre

Final
- Champion: (Japan) Taro Daniel
- Runner-up: (Argentina) Leonardo Mayer
- Score: 5–7, 6–3, 6–4

Events
Singles	Doubles
Copa Ciudad de Tigre	· 2018 →

This was the first edition of the tournament.

Taro Daniel won the title after defeating Leonardo Mayer 5–7, 6–3, 6–4 in the final.

== Seeds ==
1. (Argentina) Carlos Berlocq (quarterfinals, retired)
2. (Brazil) Rogério Dutra Silva (quarterfinals)
3. (Japan) Taro Daniel (champion)
4. (Italy) Alessandro Giannessi (withdrew)
5. (Brazil) João Souza (quarterfinals)
6. (Spain) Íñigo Cervantes (first round)
7. (Argentina) Guido Andreozzi (first round)
8. (Argentina) Leonardo Mayer (final)

== Draw ==
=== Key ===
- Q = Qualifier
- WC = Wild card
- LL = Lucky loser
- Alt = Alternate
- ITF = ITF entry
- PR = Protected ranking
- SR = Special ranking
- SE = Special exempt
- JE = Junior exempt
- JR = Junior Accelerator Programme entrant
- CO = College Accelerator Programme entrant
- NG = Next Gen Accelerator Program entrant
- w/o = Walkover
- r = Retired
- d = Defaulted

=== Finals ===
Semifinals
8	(Argentina) Leonardo Mayer	6	6
(France) Tristan Lamasine	1	1
3	(Japan) Taro Daniel	7	6
(Spain) Rubén Ramírez Hidalgo	5	2

Final
8	(Argentina) Leonardo Mayer	7	3	4
3	(Japan) Taro Daniel	5	6	6

=== Top half ===
First round
1/WC	(Argentina) C Berlocq	6	6
(France) M Bourgue	0	4
(Dominican Republic) J Hernández-Fernández	5	6	7^{7}
(Brazil) C Zampieri	7	1	6^{4}
Q	(Argentina) Matías Zukas	6	6
Alt	(Argentina) JI Londero	4	2
(Brazil) JP Sorgi	2	2
8	(Argentina) L Mayer	6	6
Q	(Brazil) D Dutra da Silva	6	1	6^{4}
(France) T Lamasine	2	6	7^{7}
WC	(Argentina) A Collarini	2	4
Q	(Argentina) GA Olivieri	6	6
LL	(Brazil) M Zormann	1	2
WC	(Argentina) F Argüello	6	6
(Argentina) T Lipovšek Puches	7^{7}	4	6
6	(Spain) Í Cervantes	6^{3}	6	3

Second round
1/WC	(Argentina) C Berlocq	6	6
(Dominican Republic) J Hernández-Fernández	3	0
Q	(Argentina) M Zukas	1	6	0
8	(Argentina) L Mayer	6	2	6
(France) T Lamasine	4	6	6
Q	(Argentina) GA Olivieri	6	3	3
WC	(Argentina) F Argüello	1	4
(Argentina) T Lipovšek Puches	6	6

Quarterfinals
1/WC	(Argentina) C Berlocq	6	2	0^{r}
8	(Argentina) L Mayer	3	6	0
(France) T Lamasine	3	6	7^{7}
(Argentina) T Lipovšek Puches	6	1	6^{4}

Semifinals
8	(Argentina) L Mayer	6	6
(France) T Lamasine	1	1

=== Bottom half ===
First round
5	(Brazil) J Souza	6	4	6
Q	(Sweden) C Lindell	3	6	3
(Argentina) M González	6^{1}	2
(Chile) N Jarry	7^{7}	6
(Brazil) G Clezar	2	5
(Italy) G Quinzi	6	7
(Argentina) M Trungelliti	0	4
3	(Japan) T Daniel	6	6
7	(Argentina) G Andreozzi	2	7^{7}	2
(Spain) R Ramírez Hidalgo	6	6^{5}	6
(France) M Janvier	2	4
WC	(Argentina) JP Paz	6	6
(Chile) C Garín	6	6^{1}	6
(Argentina) F Coria	3	7^{7}	3
(Ecuador) E Gómez	2	4
2	(Brazil) R Dutra Silva	6	6

Second round
5	(Brazil) J Souza	6	6
(Chile) N Jarry	2	4
(Italy) G Quinzi	4	0
3	(Japan) T Daniel	6	6
(Spain) R Ramírez Hidalgo	7^{7}	6
WC	(Argentina) JP Paz	6^{3}	4
(Chile) C Garín	4	6^{4}
2	(Brazil) R Dutra Silva	6	7^{7}

Quarterfinals
5	(Brazil) J Souza	3	2
3	(Japan) T Daniel	6	6
(Spain) R Ramírez Hidalgo	7^{7}	4	6
2	(Brazil) R Dutra Silva	6^{4}	6	4

Semifinals
3	(Japan) T Daniel	7	6
(Spain) R Ramírez Hidalgo	5	2
