= 2017 German Open =

- Date: 24–30 July
- Edition: 111th
- Category: ATP World Tour 500
- Draw: 32S / 16D
- Prize money: €1,499,940
- Surface: Clay / outdoor
- Location: Hamburg, Germany
- Venue: Am Rothenbaum

Champions

Singles
- (Argentina) Leonardo Mayer

Doubles
- (Croatia) Ivan Dodig / (Croatia) Mate Pavić
- German Open Tennis Championships

The 2017 German Open (also known as the 2017 German Tennis Championships) was a men's tennis tournament played on outdoor red clay courts. It was the 111th edition of the German Open Tennis Championships and part of the ATP World Tour 500 series of the 2017 ATP World Tour. It took place at the Am Rothenbaum in Hamburg, Germany, from 24 July until 30 July 2017. Unseeded Leonardo Mayer, who entered the main draw as a lucky loser, won the singles draw.

== Finals ==
=== Singles ===
- (Argentina) Leonardo Mayer defeated (Germany) Florian Mayer 6–4, 4–6, 6–3

=== Doubles ===
- (Croatia) Ivan Dodig / (Croatia) Mate Pavić defeated (Uruguay) Pablo Cuevas / (Spain) Marc López 6–3, 6–4

== Points and prize money ==
=== Points distribution ===
Event	W	F	SF	QF	Round of 16	Round of 32	Q	Q2	Q1
Singles	500	300	180	90	45	0	20	10	0
Doubles	500	300	180	90	0	—N/a	—N/a	—N/a	—N/a

=== Prize money ===
Event	W	F	SF	QF	Round of 16	Round of 32	Q2	Q1
Singles	€323,145	€158,420	€79,715	€40,540	€21,055	€11,105	€2,460	€1,250
Doubles	€97,290	€47,630	€23,890	€12,260	€6,340	—N/a	—N/a	—N/a

== Singles main draw entrants ==
=== Seeds ===
Country	Player	Rank^{1}	Seed
ESP	Albert Ramos Viñolas	24	1
URU	Pablo Cuevas	29	2
RUS	Karen Khachanov	33	3
FRA	Gilles Simon	36	4
FRA	Benoît Paire	37	5
ARG	Diego Schwartzman	38	6
ESP	Fernando Verdasco	39	7
ESP	David Ferrer	46	8

- ^{1} Rankings are as of July 17, 2017

=== Other entrants ===
The following players received wildcards into the singles main draw:

- (Germany) Daniel Altmaier
- (Germany) Tommy Haas
- (Germany) Maximilian Marterer

The following players received entry using a protected ranking:

- (Austria) Andreas Haider-Maurer
- (Russia) Dmitry Tursunov

The following player received entry as a special exempt:

- (Russia) Andrey Rublev

The following players received entry from the qualifying draw:

- (Argentina) Federico Delbonis
- (Bosnia and Herzegovina) Damir Džumhur
- (Germany) Rudolf Molleker
- (Germany) Cedrik-Marcel Stebe

The following players received entry as lucky losers:

- (Dominican Republic) José Hernández-Fernández
- (Argentina) Leonardo Mayer

=== Withdrawals ===
Before the tournament

- (Spain) Pablo Carreño Busta →replaced by (Russia) Andrey Kuznetsov
- (Croatia) Borna Ćorić →replaced by (Argentina) Nicolás Kicker
- (Brazil) Rogério Dutra Silva →replaced by (Dominican Republic) José Hernández-Fernández
- (France) Richard Gasquet →replaced by (Russia) Dmitry Tursunov
- (Slovakia) Martin Kližan →replaced by (Argentina) Leonardo Mayer
- (Japan) Yūichi Sugita →replaced by (Brazil) Rogério Dutra Silva
- (Serbia) Janko Tipsarević →replaced by (Russia) Evgeny Donskoy

== Doubles main draw entrants ==
=== Seeds ===
Country	Player	Country	Player	Rank^{1}	Seed
CRO	Ivan Dodig	CRO	Mate Pavić	25	1
URU	Pablo Cuevas	ESP	Marc López	60	2
CHI	Julio Peralta	ARG	Horacio Zeballos	72	3
POL	Marcin Matkowski	SRB	Nenad Zimonjić	82	4

- Rankings are as of July 17, 2017

=== Other entrants ===
The following pairs received wildcards into the doubles main draw:

- (Germany) Daniel Altmaier / (Germany) Tommy Haas
- (Germany) Kevin Krawietz / (Germany) Tim Pütz

The following pair received entry from the qualifying draw:

- (Argentina) Federico Delbonis / (Argentina) Leonardo Mayer

=== Withdrawals ===
During the tournament

- (Brazil) Rogério Dutra Silva
- (Spain) Fernando Verdasco
