= 2017 Copa Ciudad de Tigre =

- Date: 14–19 March
- Edition: 1st
- Surface: Hard
- Location: Tigre, Argentina

Champions

Singles
- (Japan) Taro Daniel

Doubles
- (Argentina) Máximo González / (Argentina) Andrés Molteni
Copa Ciudad de Tigre	· 2018 →

The 2017 Copa Ciudad de Tigre was a professional tennis tournament played on hardcourts. It was the first edition of the tournament which was part of the 2017 ATP Challenger Tour. It took place in Tigre, Argentina between 14 and 19 March 2017.

== Singles main-draw entrants ==
=== Seeds ===
Country	Player	Rank^{1}	Seed
ARG	Carlos Berlocq	68	1
BRA	Rogério Dutra Silva	85	2
JPN	Taro Daniel	119	3
~~ITA~~	~~Alessandro Giannessi~~	~~121~~	~~4~~
BRA	João Souza	125	5
ESP	Íñigo Cervantes	126	6
ARG	Guido Andreozzi	133	7
ARG	Leonardo Mayer	141	8

- ^{1} Rankings are as of 6 March 2017.

=== Other entrants ===
The following players received wildcards into the singles main draw:

- (Argentina) Facundo Argüello
- (Argentina) Carlos Berlocq
- (Argentina) Andrea Collarini
- (Argentina) Juan Pablo Paz

The following player received entry into the singles main draw as an alternate:

- (Argentina) Juan Ignacio Londero

The following players received entry from the qualifying draw:

- (Brazil) Daniel Dutra da Silva
- (Sweden) Christian Lindell
- (Argentina) Genaro Alberto Olivieri
- (Argentina) Matías Zukas

The following player received entry into the singles main draw as a lucky loser:

- (Brazil) Marcelo Zormann

== Champions ==
=== Singles ===
- (Japan) Taro Daniel def. (Argentina) Leonardo Mayer 5–7, 6–3, 6–4.

=== Doubles ===
- (Argentina) Máximo González / (Argentina) Andrés Molteni def. (Argentina) Guido Andreozzi / (Argentina) Guillermo Durán 6–1, 6–7^{(6–8)}, [10–5].
