= 2017 German Open – Singles =

Singles
- 2017 German Open

Final
- Champion: (Argentina) Leonardo Mayer
- Runner-up: (Germany) Florian Mayer
- Score: 6–4, 4–6, 6–3

Details
- Draw: 32 (4 Q / 3 WC )
- Seeds: 8

Events
Singles	Doubles
- German Open Tennis Championships

Martin Kližan was the defending champion, but withdrew before the tennis tournament began.

Leonardo Mayer won the title, defeating Florian Mayer in the final, 6–4, 4–6, 6–3. In so doing, Mayer became the first, and to-date the only, Lucky Loser to win an ATP 500 tournament, which is the highest event any Lucky Loser has ever won.

== Seeds ==
1. (Spain) Albert Ramos Viñolas (first round)
2. (Uruguay) Pablo Cuevas (first round)
3. (Russia) Karen Khachanov (quarterfinals)
4. (France) Gilles Simon (second round)
5. (France) Benoît Paire (second round)
6. (Argentina) Diego Schwartzman (quarterfinals)
7. (Spain) Fernando Verdasco (first round)
8. (Spain) David Ferrer (second round)

== Draw ==
Key

- Q = Qualifier
- WC = Wild card
- LL = Lucky loser
- Alt = Alternate
- ITF = ITF entry
- PR = Protected ranking
- SR = Special ranking
- SE = Special exempt
- JE = Junior exempt
- JR = Junior Accelerator Programme entrant
- CO = College Accelerator Programme entrant
- NG = Next Gen Accelerator Program entrant
- w/o = Walkover
- r = Retired
- d = Defaulted

=== Finals ===
Semifinals
LL	(Argentina) Leonardo Mayer	6	7
Q	(Argentina) Federico Delbonis	3	5
(Germany) Philipp Kohlschreiber	6	2^{r}
(Germany) Florian Mayer	4	3

Final
LL	(Argentina) Leonardo Mayer	6	4	6
(Germany) Florian Mayer	4	6	3

=== Top half ===
First round
1	(Spain) A Ramos Viñolas	7^{7}	3	6^{4}
LL	(Argentina) L Mayer	6^{3}	6	7^{7}
(Germany) J-L Struff	6	6
(Russia) E Donskoy	3	4
(Argentina) H Zeballos	7^{7}	6
WC	(Germany) D Altmaier	6^{2}	4
(Czech Republic) J Veselý	7^{9}	6^{0}	6
7	(Spain) F Verdasco	6^{7}	7^{7}	3
3	(Russia) K Khachanov	6	6
Q	(Germany) R Molleker	4	3
LL	(Dominican Republic) J Hernández-Fernández	1	2
(United Kingdom) A Bedene	6	6
(Argentina) C Berlocq	7^{8}	5	3
Q	(Argentina) F Delbonis	6^{6}	7	6
(Georgia (country)) N Basilashvili	2	6	3
8	(Spain) D Ferrer	6	3	6

Second round
LL	(Argentina) L Mayer	6	7
(Germany) J-L Struff	2	5
(Argentina) H Zeballos	4	4
(Czech Republic) J Veselý	6	6
3	(Russia) K Khachanov	7^{7}	5	6
(United Kingdom) A Bedene	6^{4}	7	4
Q	(Argentina) F Delbonis	7	6
8	(Spain) D Ferrer	5	3

Quarterfinals
LL	(Argentina) L Mayer	7^{7}	6
(Czech Republic) J Veselý	6^{4}	3
3	(Russia) K Khachanov	5	6	4
Q	(Argentina) F Delbonis	7	3	6

Semifinals
LL	(Argentina) L Mayer	6	7
Q	(Argentina) F Delbonis	3	5

=== Bottom half ===
First round
5	(France) B Paire	6	6
PR	(Russia) D Tursunov	3	2
WC	(Germany) T Haas	5	2
(Argentina) N Kicker	7	6
(Germany) P Kohlschreiber	6	6
SE	(Russia) A Rublev	3	1
WC	(Germany) M Marterer	2	6	4
4	(France) G Simon	6	4	6
6	(Argentina) D Schwartzman	6	6
PR	(Austria) A Haider-Maurer	2	3
Q	(Germany) C-M Stebe	6	6
Q	(Bosnia and Herzegovina) D Džumhur	3	4
(Italy) M Cecchinato	5	2
(Germany) F Mayer	7	6
(Russia) A Kuznetsov	3	7	6
2	(Uruguay) P Cuevas	6	5	4

Second round
5	(France) B Paire	4	6^{7}
(Argentina) N Kicker	6	7^{9}
(Germany) P Kohlschreiber	6	3	6
4	(France) G Simon	3	6	2
6	(Argentina) D Schwartzman	1	6	6
Q	(Germany) C-M Stebe	6	4	2
(Germany) F Mayer	6	4	6
(Russia) A Kuznetsov	3	6	4

Quarterfinals
(Argentina) N Kicker	6^{6}	6	4
(Germany) P Kohlschreiber	7^{8}	4	6
6	(Argentina) D Schwartzman	2	6	3
(Germany) F Mayer	6	2	6

Semifinals
(Germany) P Kohlschreiber	6	2^{r}
(Germany) F Mayer	4	3

== Qualifying ==
=== Seeds ===
1. (Bosnia and Herzegovina) Damir Džumhur (qualified)
2. (Argentina) Federico Delbonis (qualified)
3. (Hungary) Márton Fucsovics (first round)
4. (Norway) Casper Ruud (first round)
5. (Ukraine) Sergiy Stakhovsky (qualifying competition)
6. (Argentina) Leonardo Mayer (qualifying competition, lucky loser)
7. (Portugal) Gastão Elias (first round, retired)
8. (France) Kenny de Schepper (qualifying competition)

=== Qualifiers ===
1. (Bosnia and Herzegovina) Damir Džumhur
2. (Argentina) Federico Delbonis
3. (Germany) Cedrik-Marcel Stebe
4. (Germany) Rudolf Molleker

=== Lucky losers ===
1. (Argentina) Leonardo Mayer
2. (Dominican Republic) José Hernández-Fernández

=== Qualifying draw ===
==== First qualifier ====
First round
1	(Bosnia and Herzegovina) Damir Džumhur	6	7
(Austria) Michael Linzer	3	5
WC	(Germany) Jason Jeremy Hildebrandt	2	4
5	(Ukraine) Sergiy Stakhovsky	6	6

Qualifying competition
1	(Bosnia and Herzegovina) Damir Džumhur	7^{7}	7
5	(Ukraine) Sergiy Stakhovsky	6^{5}	5

==== Second qualifier ====
First round
2	(Argentina) Federico Delbonis	6	6
(Dominican Republic) José Hernández-Fernández	1	2
(Argentina) Máximo González	5	5
8	(France) Kenny de Schepper	7	7

Qualifying competition
2	(Argentina) Federico Delbonis	6	6
8	(France) Kenny de Schepper	1	0

==== Third qualifier ====
First round
3	(Hungary) Márton Fucsovics	5	7^{7}	4
(Germany) Cedrik-Marcel Stebe	7	6^{3}	6
(Germany) Oscar Otte	1
7	(Portugal) Gastão Elias	2^{r}

Qualifying competition
(Germany) Cedrik-Marcel Stebe	6^{2}	7^{7}	6
(Germany) Oscar Otte	7^{7}	6^{2}	1

==== Fourth qualifier ====
First round
4	(Norway) Casper Ruud	6	4	4
WC	(Germany) Rudolf Molleker	2	6	6
WC	(Germany) Louis Wessels	3	2
6	(Argentina) Leonardo Mayer	6	6

Qualifying competition
WC	(Germany) Rudolf Molleker	7^{7}	3	6
6	(Argentina) Leonardo Mayer	6^{2}	6	3
