= Copa Ciudad de Tigre =

- 2017 Copa Ciudad de Tigre

Defunct tennis tournament
- Event name: Copa Ciudad de Tigre
- Location: Tigre, Buenos Aires, Argentina
- Venue: Complejo Jeep Park de Benavídez
- Category: ATP Challenger Tour
- Surface: Hard
- Draw: 32S/32Q/16D
- Prize money: $50,000 + H

The Copa Ciudad de Tigre was a professional tennis tournament played on hardcourts. It was part of the ATP Challenger Tour. It was held in Tigre, Buenos Aires, Argentina in 2017.

== Past finals ==
=== Singles ===
Year	Champion	Runner-up	Score
2017	(Japan) Taro Daniel	(Argentina) Leonardo Mayer	5–7, 6–3, 6–4

=== Doubles ===
Year	Champions	Runners-up	Score
2017	(Argentina) Máximo González (Argentina) Andrés Molteni	(Argentina) Guido Andreozzi (Argentina) Guillermo Durán	6–1, 6–7^{(6–8)}, [10–5]
