= Leonardo Mayer =

Argentine tennis player (born 1987)

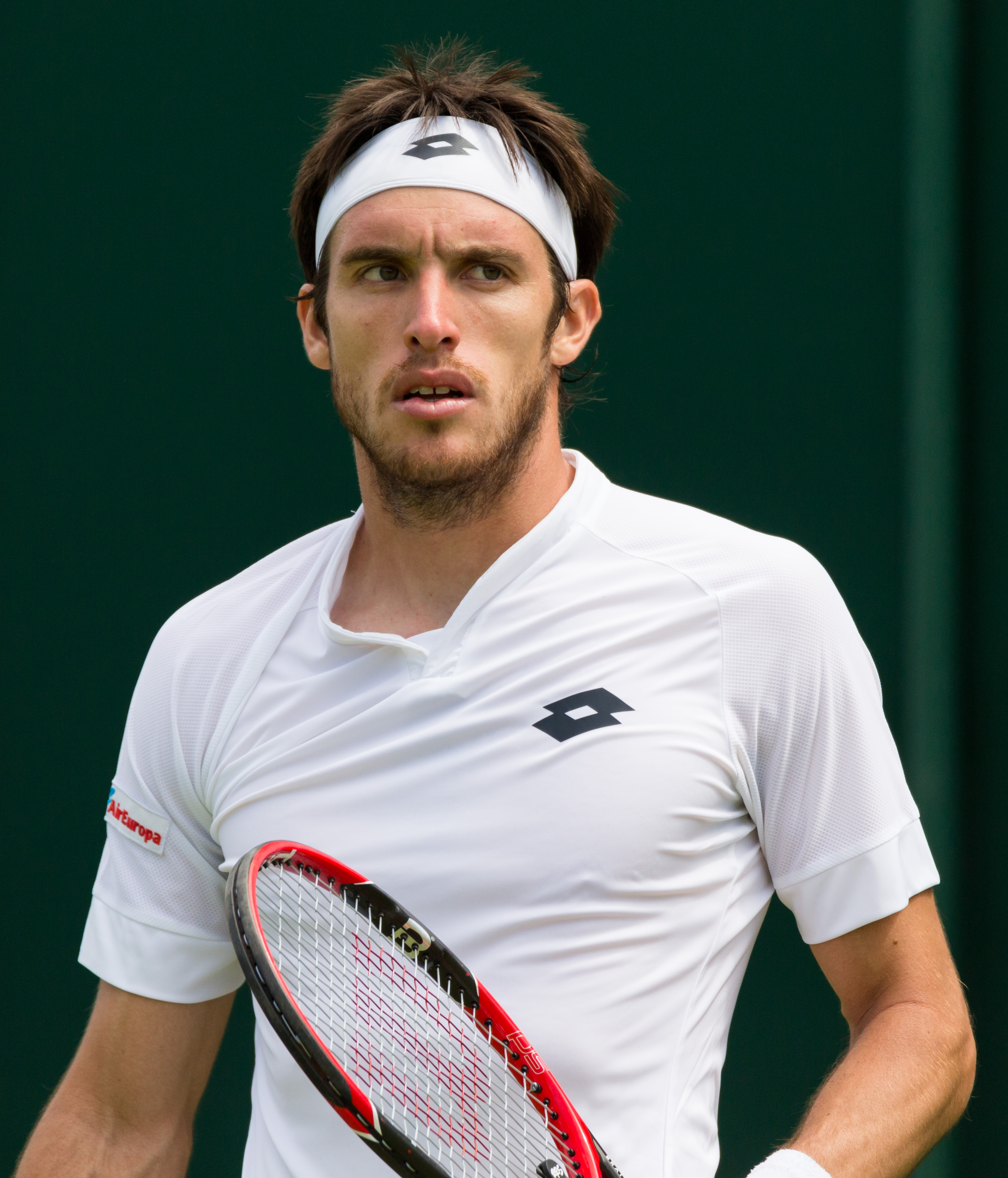
- Country (sports): Argentina
- Residence: Buenos Aires, Argentina
- Born: 15 May 1987 (age 39) Corrientes, Argentina
- Height: 1.91 m (6 ft 3 in)
- Turned pro: 2003
- Retired: 2022
- Plays: Right-handed (one-handed backhand)
- Coach: Alejandro Fabbri; Leo Alonso
- Prize money: US $7,035,294
- Official website: leonardomayer.net

Singles
- Career record: 179–197
- Career titles: 2
- Highest ranking: No. 21 (22 June 2015)

Grand Slam singles results
- Australian Open: 2R (2014, 2015, 2018, 2019)
- French Open: 4R (2019)
- Wimbledon: 4R (2014)
- US Open: 3R (2012, 2014, 2017)

Doubles
- Career record: 94–123
- Career titles: 1
- Highest ranking: No. 48 (28 January 2019)

Grand Slam doubles results
- Australian Open: SF (2019)
- French Open: 3R (2015, 2018)
- Wimbledon: 3R (2018)
- US Open: QF (2014, 2015, 2019)

Team competitions
- Davis Cup: W (2016)
- Last updated on: 5 August 2021.

Leonardo Martín Mayer (Spanish: [leoˈnaɾðo maɾˈtim ˈmaʝeɾ], (Note: In isolation, Martín is pronounced [maɾˈtin].) German: [ˈmaɪɐ]; born May 15, 1987) is a tennis coach and a former professional player from Argentina. Mayer achieved a career-high singles ranking of world No. 21 in June 2015 and world No. 48 in doubles in January 2019.

== Career ==
=== Early career ===
Mayer started playing tennis at age nine.

=== 2005–2008: Juniors and ITF ===
As a junior, Mayer won the 2005 French Open Boys' Doubles and the Orange Bowl with Emiliano Massa, reaching as high as No. 2 in the combined world rankings in June 2005.

He won one Challenger singles title in 2008 and lost in three other finals.

=== 2009–2013: Becoming a professional tennis player ===
Mayer qualified for his first Grand Slam at the 2009 French Open and beat 15th seed James Blake in straight sets in the first round. He lost to Tommy Haas in five sets in the second round. At Wimbledon, he beat Óscar Hernández in straight sets in the first round. He lost to Fernando González in four sets in the second round.

Mayer had a successful American summer, reaching the semifinals of the LA Tennis Open (lost to Carsten Ball) and the quarterfinals of the Pilot Pen Tennis tournament in New Haven (lost to Igor Andreev). At the 2009 US Open, Mayer reached the second round, losing to Radek Štěpánek in straight sets.

In 2011, Mayer qualified for the Brasil Open and defeated world no. 73 Igor Andreev in the first round of the main draw. In the second round, he played seventh-seeded Italian Potito Starace and lost.

Mayer reached the third round of the French Open for the third time and the US Open in 2012, losing to Nicolás Almagro in straight sets at Roland Garros and Juan Martín del Potro in New York.

=== 2014: First ATP title and top 30 ===
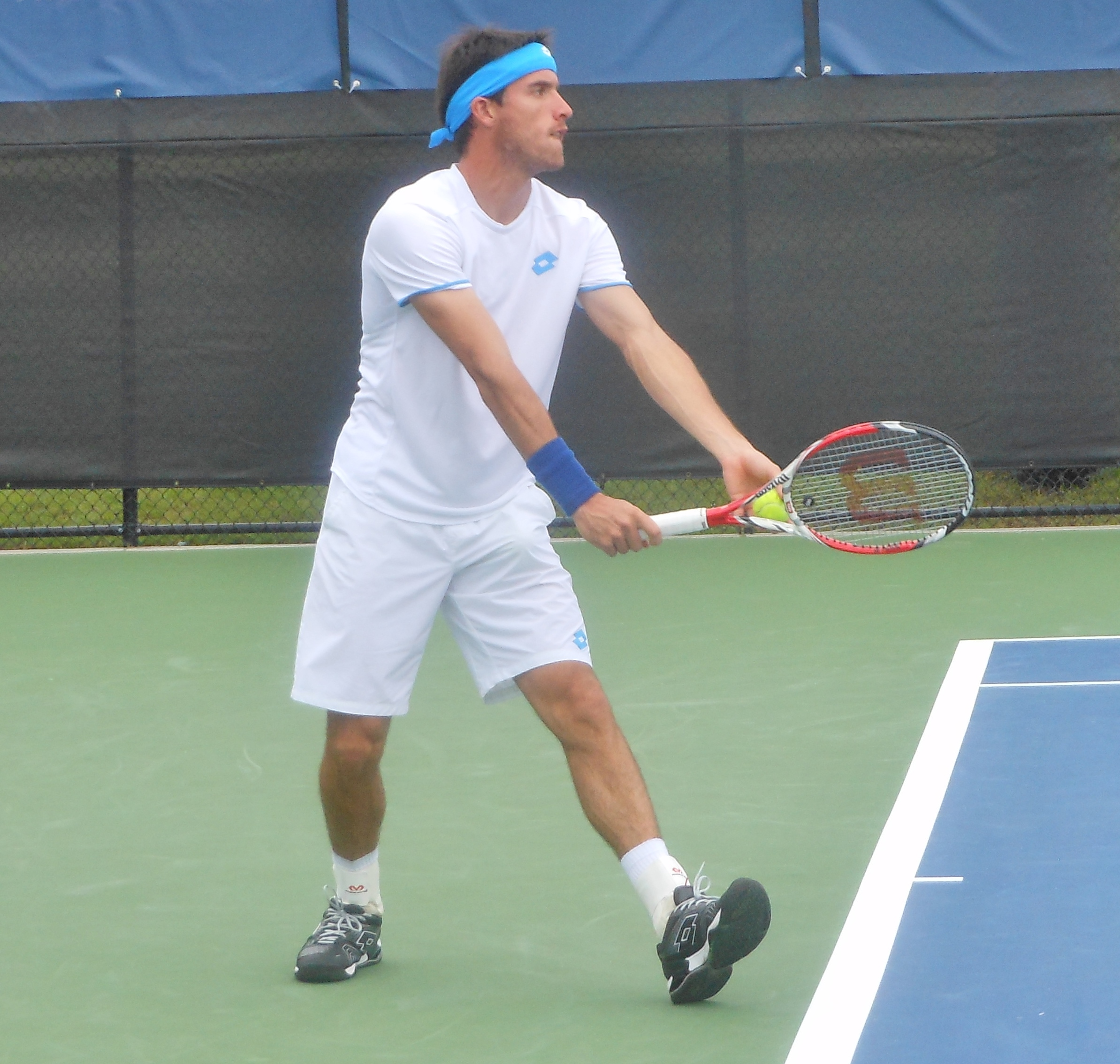
Mayer at the 2014 Winston-Salem Open

In February 2014, Mayer reached his first career ATP final at Viña del Mar, defeating second seed Tommy Robredo en route. Mayer lost to top-seed Fabio Fognini in straight sets. At Oeiras and Niza, he reached the quarterfinals as a qualifier in both. He was defeated in the third round of the French Open by Rafael Nadal.

At Wimbledon, he reached the fourth round of a Grand Slam for the first time. He defeated No. 25 seed Andreas Seppi, former Wimbledon semifinalist and Australian Open runner-up Marcos Baghdatis, and Andrey Kuznetsov before being defeated by Grigor Dimitrov in straight sets. With this run, Mayer was ranked in the top 50 for the first time in his career.

Next, Mayer played in the 2014 MercedesCup, where he lost in the second round to Mikhail Youzhny. Then, he played at the 2014 International German Open, where he beat Guillermo García López and Philipp Kohlschreiber, reaching the final without dropping a set. In the final, he defeated top seed David Ferrer in three sets, winning his first ATP title.

Seeded 23rd at the 2014 US Open, Mayer reached the third round, being defeated by Kei Nishikori. In the doubles tournament, he partnered with compatriot Carlos Berlocq and made it to the quarterfinals, beating the reigning Wimbledon champions Jack Sock and Vasek Pospisil.

Mayer won his two singles rubbers against Israel in the Davis Cup Play-offs, helping Argentina to secure a place in the 2015 World Group.

Mayer lost in the second round at the Malaysian Open to Jarkko Nieminen and in the first round of the China Open to Martin Kližan. He lost in the second round of the Shanghai Masters to Roger Federer, who saved five match points against Mayer.

=== 2015: Career high ranking of World No. 21 ===
Mayer started the year at Doha, where he lost in the first round in a tight three-set match against Andreas Seppi. Then, he competed in the Apia International Sydney, where he reached the semifinals but was defeated by Mikhail Kukushkin. In the Australian Open, he was seeded 27th but was defeated by Viktor Troicki in four sets in the second round.

Next, Mayer reached the quarterfinals at the Brasil Open, being defeated by local favourite João Souza. On March 8, 2015, he played in the longest singles match in Davis Cup history, beating João Souza in 6 hours and 42 minutes, 7–6^{(7–4)}, 7–6^{(7–5)}, 5–7, 5–7, 15–13. Mayer was unable to recover in time for the Indian Wells Masters and was defeated in the third round of the Miami Masters by Kevin Anderson.

The Argentine started the European clay-court swing with a first round loss in Barcelona. Then, he reached the third round at Madrid and the second round in the Rome Masters. In the Open de Nice Côte d'Azur, he reached the third ATP final of his career, losing to Dominic Thiem. Mayer reached the third round of the French Open as the 23rd seed, being defeated by Marin Čilić in straight sets.

In the grass court season, Mayer reached the quarterfinals at Nottingham (lost to Denis Istomin) and the third round of Wimbledon where he was the 24th seed before he (lost to Kevin Anderson) in straight sets.

=== 2016: Davis Cup Champion ===
Mayer lost in the first round of the 2016 Australian Open and the 2016 French Open. He had minor success in the 2016 Indian Wells Masters beating Sam Groth and 20th seed Viktor Troicki before losing to Marin Čilić in the third round. In the 2016 Wimbledon Championships, he lost in the first round to Donald Young.

In the Davis Cup semifinal between Great Britain and Argentina, Mayer beat Daniel Evans in the fifth and deciding rubber, sending Argentina into its fifth Davis Cup Final. Mayer teamed with Juan Martín del Potro for doubles in the Davis Cup Final against Croatia. They lost to Marin Čilić and Ivan Dodig. However, Argentina won their first championship 3 to 2.

=== 2017: Second ATP title and back to top 50 ===
Mayer lost in the second round of the 2017 Argentina Open and the 2017 U.S. Men's Clay Court Championships (lost to John Isner). In July he lost in the 2nd round of qualifying to a teenager in the 2017 German Open only to enter the MD as lucky loser and win his first tournament as a father (his son Valentino was born in February 2017).

He became the first lucky loser to win an ATP 500 tournament. In the final, he defeated Florian Mayer in three sets, winning his second ATP 500 title. Due to winning his second Hamburg title, Mayer climbed 89 spots, breaking into the top 50 for the first time since 2016, at number 49.

=== 2018: Third Hamburg Final ===
Defeated 3 players ranked outside Top 100 to reach ATP Masters 1000 Indian Wells 4R (lost to his boyhood friend and eventual champion Juan Martín del Potro in 3 sets). Reached QFs at Buenos Aires and São Paulo. Improved to 2–29 vs. Top 10 players by beating Kevin Anderson in 3rd-set TB at London/Queen's Club. Fell to A. Zverev in ATP Masters 1000 Madrid 3R, but earned only break point faced by German en route to title. Squandered 6 MPs vs. Nicolas Jarry in the ATP Estoril 1R (most of all players to lose a match this season). Blew a 2-set lead for 1st time in career at Wimbledon (lost to Struff in 1R). Finished as Brisbane doubles runner-up in 1st event with Zeballos since 2010 Wimbledon (l. to Kontinen/Peers).

=== 2019: Australian doubles semifinal & French singles fourth round ===
Mayer reached the semifinals of a Grand Slam in doubles for the first time in his career at the 2019 Australian Open partnering João Sousa. The pair also reached the quarterfinals at the 2019 US Open.

He made the fourth round of the French Open where he lost to world No. 3 Roger Federer in straight sets.

=== 2020: Severe dip in form ===
Mayer only played eight matches in 2020 and lost all eight. His final Grand Slam was the 2020 US Open where he lost in the first round to 25th seed Milos Raonic in straight sets.

=== 2021: Retirement ===
Mayer played his last ATP tournament at the 2021 Chile Open where he lost in the first round to Pedro Sousa in straight sets. His last event was 2021 Wimbledon qualifying where he lost in the first round to compatriot Marco Trungelliti in straight sets.

On October 7, 2021, Mayer announced his retirement from tennis.

== ATP career finals ==
=== Singles: 5 (2 titles, 3 runner-ups) ===
Legend Grand Slam tournaments (0–0) ATP World Tour Finals (0–0) ATP World Tour Masters 1000 (0–0) ATP World Tour 500 Series (2–1) ATP World Tour 250 Series (0–2)	Titles by surface Hard (0–0) Clay (2–3) Grass (0–0)	Titles by setting Outdoor (2–3) Indoor (0–0)

Result	W–L	Date	Tournament	Tier	Surface	Opponent	Score
Loss	0–1	Feb 2014	Chile Open, Chile	250 Series	Clay	(Italy) Fabio Fognini	2–6, 4–6
Win	1–1	Jul 2014	German Open, Germany	500 Series	Clay	(Spain) David Ferrer	6–7^{(3–7)}, 6–1, 7–6^{(7–4)}
Loss	1–2	May 2015	Open de Nice Côte d'Azur, France	250 Series	Clay	(Austria) Dominic Thiem	7–6^{(10–8)}, 5–7, 6–7^{(2–7)}
Win	2–2	Jul 2017	German Open, Germany (2)	500 Series	Clay	(Germany) Florian Mayer	6–4, 4–6, 6–3
Loss	2–3	Jul 2018	German Open, Germany	500 Series	Clay	(Georgia (country)) Nikoloz Basilashvili	4–6, 6–0, 5–7

=== Doubles: 5 (1 title, 4 runner-ups) ===
Legend Grand Slam tournaments (0–0) ATP World Tour Finals (0–0) ATP World Tour Masters 1000 (0–0) ATP World Tour 500 Series (0–0) ATP World Tour 250 Series (1–4)	Titles by surface Hard (0–3) Clay (1–1) Grass (0–0)	Titles by setting Outdoor (1–2) Indoor (0–1)

Result	W–L	Date	Tournament	Tier	Surface	Partner	Opponents	Score
Loss	0–1	Feb 2010	Pacific Coast Championships, US	250 Series	Hard (i)	(Germany) Benjamin Becker	(United States) Mardy Fish (United States) Sam Querrey	6–7^{(3–7)}, 5–7
Win	1–1	Feb 2011	Argentina Open, Argentina	250 Series	Clay	(Austria) Oliver Marach	(Brazil) Franco Ferreiro (Brazil) André Sá	7–6^{(8–6)}, 6–3
Loss	1–2	Aug 2012	Winston-Salem Open, US	250 Series	Hard	(Spain) Pablo Andújar	(Mexico) Santiago González (United States) Scott Lipsky	3–6, 6–4, [2–10]
Loss	1–3	Jan 2018	Brisbane International, Australia	250 Series	Hard	(Argentina) Horacio Zeballos	(Finland) Henri Kontinen (Australia) John Peers	6–3, 3–6, [2–10]
Loss	1–4	Feb 2020	Córdoba Open, Argentina	250 Series	Clay	(Argentina) Andrés Molteni	(Brazil) Marcelo Demoliner (Netherlands) Matwé Middelkoop	3–6, 6–7^{(4–7)}

== Records ==
- These records were attained in the Open Era of tennis.

Tournament	Year	Record accomplished	Player tied
Hamburg	2017	Winning an ATP tournament as lucky loser	Heinz Günthardt; Bill Scanlon; Francisco Clavet; Christian Miniussi; Sergiy Stakhovsky; Rajeev Ram; Andrey Rublev; Marco Cecchinato; Kwon Soon-woo

== Team competitions finals ==
=== Davis Cup: 1 (1 title) ===
Outcome	Date	Tournament	Surface	Partner(s)	Opponents	Score
Win	Nov 2016	Davis Cup, Zagreb, Croatia	Hard (i)	(Argentina) Juan Martín del Potro (Argentina) Federico Delbonis (Argentina) Guido Pella	(Croatia) Marin Čilić (Croatia) Ivo Karlović (Croatia) Ivan Dodig (Croatia) Franko Škugor	3–2

== ATP Challenger and ITF Futures finals ==
=== Singles: 22 (10-12) ===
Legend (singles) ATP Challenger Tour (9–12) ITF Futures Tour (1–0)	Titles by surface Hard (1–4) Clay (9–8) Grass (0–0) Carpet (0–0)

Result	W–L	Date	Tournament	Tier	Surface	Opponent	Score
Win	1-0	Nov 2005	Chile F6, Santiago	Futures	Clay	(Argentina) Emiliano Redondi	6-3, 6–4
Loss	1-1	Nov 2006	Puebla, Mexico	Challenger	Hard	(United States) Robert Kendrick	5–7, 4–6
Win	2-1	Jul 2007	Cuenca, Ecuador	Challenger	Clay	(Brazil) Thomaz Bellucci	6–3, 6–2
Loss	2-2	Aug 2007	Graz, Austria	Challenger	Clay	(Romania) Victor Hănescu	6–7^{(4–7)}, 3–6
Win	3-2	Nov 2007	Puebla, Mexico	Challenger	Hard	(Poland) Dawid Olejniczak	6–1, 6–4
Loss	3-3	Aug 2008	Bronx, USA	Challenger	Hard	(Czech Republic) Lukáš Dlouhý	0–6, 1–6
Loss	3-4	Sep 2008	Cali, Colombia	Challenger	Clay	(Brazil) Marcos Daniel	2–6 RET
Loss	3-5	Oct 2008	Asunción, Paraguay	Challenger	Clay	(Argentina) Martín Vassallo Argüello	6–3, 3–6, 6–7^{(2–7)}
Win	4-5	Nov 2008	Medellín, Colombia	Challenger	Clay	(Argentina) Sergio Roitman	6–4, 7–5
Win	5-5	Jul 2011	Dortmund, Germany	Challenger	Clay	(Netherlands) Thomas Schoorel	6–3, 6–2
Loss	5-6	Aug 2011	Trani, Italy	Challenger	Clay	(Belgium) Steve Darcis	6–4, 3–6, 2–6
Loss	5-7	Sep 2011	Genova, Italy	Challenger	Clay	(Slovakia) Martin Kližan	3–6, 1–6
Win	6-7	Oct 2011	Napoli, Italy	Challenger	Clay	(Italy) Alessandro Giannessi	6–3, 6–4
Win	7-7	Nov 2011	São Leopoldo, Brazil	Challenger	Clay	(Serbia) Nikola Ćirić	7–5, 7–6^{(7–1)}
Loss	7-8	Nov 2012	Medellín, Colombia	Challenger	Clay	(Italy) Paolo Lorenzi	6–7^{(5–7)}, 7–6^{(7–4)}, 4–6
Win	8-8	Nov 2012	Guayaquil, Ecuador	Challenger	Clay	(Italy) Paolo Lorenzi	6–2, 6–4
Loss	8-9	Sep 2013	Orléans, France	Challenger	Hard(i)	(Czech Republic) Radek Štěpánek	3–6, 4–6
Win	9-9	Nov 2013	Guayaquil, Ecuador	Challenger	Clay	(Portugal) Pedro Sousa	6–4, 7–5
Win	10-9	Aug 2016	Manerbio, Italy	Challenger	Clay	(Serbia) Filip Krajinović	7–6 ^{(7–3)}, 7–5
Loss	10-10	Oct 2016	Buenos Aires, Argentina	Challenger	Clay	(Argentina) Renzo Olivo	6–2, 6–7^{(3–7)}, 6–7^{(3–7)}
Loss	10-11	Mar 2017	Tigre, Argentina	Challenger	Hard	(Japan) Taro Daniel	7–5, 3–6, 4–6
Loss	10-12	Jul 2017	Båstad, Sweden	Challenger	Clay	(Serbia) Dušan Lajović	6–2, 7–6^{(7–4)}

=== Doubles: 19 (11–8) ===
Legend (singles) ATP Challenger Tour (8–8) ITF Futures Tour (3–0)	Titles by surface Hard (2–2) Clay (9–6) Grass (0–0) Carpet (0–0)

Result	W–L	Date	Tournament	Tier	Surface	Partner	Opponents	Score
Win	1–0	Aug 2005	Argentina F6, Buenos Aires	Futures	Clay	(Argentina) Emiliano Massa	(Argentina) Diego Cristin (Argentina) Máximo González	6–1, 5–7, 6–4
Win	2–0	Sep 2005	Argentina F12, Buenos Aires	Futures	Clay	(Argentina) Emiliano Massa	(Argentina) Diego Cristin (Argentina) Lucas Arnold Ker	7–6^{(7–4)}, 6–3
Loss	2–1	Jul 2006	Campos do Jordão, Brazil	Challenger	Hard	(Sweden) Jacob Adaktusson	(Brazil) Marcelo Melo (Brazil) André Sá	6–7^{(1–7)}, 5–7
Win	3–1	Sep 2006	Brazil F12, Caldas Novas	Futures	Hard	(Argentina) Sebastián Decoud	(Brazil) Frederico Casaro (United States) Mashiska Washington	6–4, 7–5
Win	4–1	Nov 2006	Guayaquil, Ecuador	Challenger	Clay	(Argentina) Juan Pablo Brzezicki	(Uruguay) Marcel Felder (Spain) Fernando Vicente	1–6, 7–5, [14–12]
Win	5–1	May 2007	Naples, United States	Challenger	Clay	(Argentina) Juan Pablo Brzezicki	(Uruguay) Pablo Cuevas (Argentina) Horacio Zeballos	6–1, 6–7^{(4–7)}, [10–8]
Loss	5–2	Jul 2007	Córdoba, Spain	Challenger	Hard	(Chile) Paul Capdeville	(Spain) Santiago Ventura (Spain) Fernando Vicente	4–6, 3–6
Loss	5–3	Jul 2007	Bogotá, Colombia	Challenger	Clay	(Colombia) Pablo Gonzalez	(Mexico) Santiago González (Argentina) Brian Dabul	2–6, 2–6
Loss	5–4	Oct 2007	Belo Horizonte, Brazil	Challenger	Clay	(Chile) Adrián García	(Spain) Marcel Granollers (Spain) Fernando Vicente	3–6, 3–6
Win	6–4	Apr 2008	Florianapolis, Brazil	Challenger	Clay	(Chile) Adrián García	(Brazil) Bruno Soares (Brazil) Thomaz Bellucci	6–2, 6–0
Loss	6–5	Jun 2008	Reggio Emilia, Italy	Challenger	Clay	(Argentina) Mariano Hood	(China) Yu Xinyuan (China) Zeng Shaoxuan	3–6, 4–6
Win	7–5	Sep 2008	Quito, Ecuador	Challenger	Clay	(United States) Hugo Armando	(Brazil) Ricardo Mello (Brazil) Caio Zampieri	7–5, 6–2
Win	8–5	Oct 2008	Asunción, Paraguay	Challenger	Clay	(Argentina) Alejandro Fabbri	(Argentina) Mariano Hood (Argentina) Martín García	7–5, 6–4
Win	9–5	Jan 2009	São Paulo, Brazil	Challenger	Hard	(Argentina) Carlos Berlocq	(Argentina) Mariano Hood (Argentina) Horacio Zeballos	7–6^{(7–1)}, 6–3
Win	10–5	May 2009	Tunis, Tunisia	Challenger	Clay	(Argentina) Brian Dabul	(Sweden) Johan Brunström (Netherlands Antilles) Jean-Julien Rojer	6–4, 7–6^{(8–6)}
Loss	10–6	Nov 2012	Guayaquil, Ecuador	Challenger	Clay	(Argentina) Martín Ríos-Benítez	(Argentina) Facundo Bagnis (Argentina) Martín Alund	5–7, 6–7^{(5–7)}
Loss	10–7	Aug 2016	Manerbio, Italy	Challenger	Clay	(Argentina) Juan Ignacio Galarza	(Croatia) Nikola Mektić (Croatia) Antonio Šančić	5–7, 1–6
Win	11–7	Oct 2016	Lima, Peru	Challenger	Clay	(Peru) Sergio Galdós	(Uruguay) Ariel Behar (Chile) Gonzalo Lama	6–2, 7–6^{(9–7)}
Loss	11–8	Apr 2017	Tallahassee, United States	Challenger	Clay	(Argentina) Máximo González	(United States) Scott Lipsky (India) Leander Paes	6–4, 6–7^{(5–7)}, [7–10]

== Junior Grand Slam finals ==
=== Doubles: 1 (1 title) ===
Result	Year	Tournament	Surface	Partner	Opponent	Score
Win	2005	French Open	Clay	(Argentina) Emiliano Massa	(Ukraine) Sergey Bubka (France) Jérémy Chardy	2–6, 6–3, 6–4

== Performance timelines ==
Key
W	F	SF	QF	#R	RR	Q#	P#	DNQ	A	Z#	PO	G	S	B	NMS	NTI	P	NH

(W) winner; (F) finalist; (SF) semifinalist; (QF) quarterfinalist; (#R) rounds 4, 3, 2, 1; (RR) round-robin stage; (Q#) qualification round; (P#) preliminary round; (DNQ) did not qualify; (A) absent; (Z#) Davis/Fed Cup Zonal Group (with number indication) or (PO) play-off; (G) gold, (S) silver or (B) bronze Olympic/Paralympic medal; (NMS) not a Masters tournament; (NTI) not a Tier I tournament; (P) postponed; (NH) not held; (SR) strike rate (events won / competed); (W–L) win–loss record.
To avoid confusion and double counting, these charts are updated at the conclusion of a tournament or when the player's participation has ended.

=== Singles ===
Current through the 2021 Wimbledon Championships.

Tournament	2007	2008	2009	2010	2011	2012	2013	2014	2015	2016	2017	2018	2019	2020	2021	SR	W–L	Win %
Grand Slam tournaments
Australian Open	Q2	A	A	1R	1R	1R	1R	2R	2R	1R	A	2R	2R	1R	A	0 / 10	4–10	29%
French Open	Q1	A	2R	3R	3R	3R	1R	3R	3R	1R	Q2	1R	4R	Q3	Q1	0 / 10	14–10	58%
Wimbledon	Q2	Q1	2R	1R	Q1	1R	2R	4R	3R	1R	A	1R	2R	NH	Q1	0 / 9	8–9	47%
US Open	Q2	Q2	2R	1R	A	3R	2R	3R	1R	A	3R	1R	1R	1R	A	0 / 10	8–10	47%
Win–loss	0–0	0–0	3–3	2–4	2–2	4–4	2–4	8–4	5–4	0–3	2–1	1–4	5–4	0–2	0–0	0 / 39	34–39	47%
ATP World Tour Masters 1000
Indian Wells	A	A	A	1R	A	2R	3R	A	A	3R	A	4R	2R	NH	A	0 / 6	9–6	60%
Miami	A	A	Q1	1R	A	1R	1R	A	3R	1R	A	2R	3R	NH	A	0 / 7	5–7	42%
Monte Carlo	A	A	A	A	A	Q1	A	Q1	A	A	A	A	Q1	NH	A	0 / 0	0–0	–
Madrid	A	A	A	2R	A	A	A	Q1	3R	1R	A	3R	Q1	NH	A	0 / 4	5–4	56%
Rome	A	A	A	1R	A	A	A	A	2R	1R	A	1R	A	Q2	A	0 / 4	1–4	20%
Canada	A	A	2R	1R	A	Q1	A	A	2R	A	A	A	A	NH	A	0 / 3	2–3	40%
Cincinnati	A	A	A	A	A	Q2	A	A	1R	A	A	3R	A	A	A	0 / 2	2–2	50%
Shanghai	NH		Q1	A	A	A	A	2R	2R	A	Q2	1R	A	NH		0 / 3	2–3	40%
Paris	A	A	A	A	A	A	A	1R	2R	A	A	A	A	A	A	0 / 2	1–2	33%
Win–loss	0–0	0–0	1–1	1–5	0–0	1–2	2–2	1–2	8–7	2–4	0–0	8–6	3–2	0–0	0–0	0 / 31	27–31	47%
National representation
Davis Cup	A	A	QF	SF	A	A	SF	PO	SF	W	1R	A	QF	QR	A			
Win–loss	0–0	0–0	0–0	1–2	0–0	0–0	1–1	2–0	4–0	3–0	0–0	0–0	0–0	0–1	0–0	1 / 7	11–4	73%
Career statistics
	2007	2008	2009	2010	2011	2012	2013	2014	2015	2016	2017	2018	2019	2020	2021	Career		
Tournaments	0	1	18	19	7	14	18	21	23	15	9	25	18	7	1	196		
Titles–Finals	0–0	0–0	0–0	0–0	0–0	0–0	0–0	1–2	0–1	0–0	1–1	0–1	0–0	0–0	0–0	2 / 5		
Overall win–loss	0–0	1–1	17–18	13–21	4–7	14–14	13–18	28–20	28–23	12–15	11–8	22–25	16–18	0–8	0–1	2 / 196	179–197	48%
Win %	–	50%	49%	38%	36%	50%	42%	58%	55%	44%	58%	47%	47%	0%	0%	47.61%		
Year-end ranking	179	115	75	94	78	72	94	28	35	139	52	56	92	135	309	$7,035,089		

=== Doubles ===
Tournament	2009	2010	2011	2012	2013	2014	2015	2016	2017	2018	2019	2020	2021	SR	W–L	Win %
Grand Slam tournaments
Australian Open	A	3R	1R	2R	1R	1R	2R	1R	A	2R	SF	2R	A	0 / 10	10–10	50%
French Open	A	2R	A	1R	1R	1R	3R	2R	A	3R	1R	2R	A	0 / 9	7–9	44%
Wimbledon	1R	2R	A	1R	1R	1R	1R	1R	A	3R	2R	NH	A	0 / 9	4–9	31%
US Open	1R	2R	A	2R	1R	QF	QF	A	3R	2R	QF	A	A	0 / 9	13–9	59%
Win–loss	0–2	5–4	0–1	2–4	0–4	2–4	6–4	1–3	2–1	6–4	8–4	2–2	0–0	0 / 37	34–37	48%

== Top-10 wins per season ==
- He has a 2–32 record against players who were, at the time the match was played, ranked in the top 10.

#	Player	Rank	Event	Surface	Rd	Score	LMR
2014
1.	(Spain) David Ferrer	7	Hamburg, Hamburg, Germany	Clay	F	6–7^{(3–7)}, 6–1, 7–6^{(7–4)}	46
2018
2.	(South Africa) Kevin Anderson	8	Queen's Club Championships, London, United Kingdom	Grass	1R	7–6^{(7–4)}, 4–6, 7–6^{(7–3)}	36

== Personal life ==
Mayer is married to fellow Argentinian Milagros Aventin.
